= List of Chinese films of 2014 =

The following is a list of mainland Chinese films first released in year 2014. There were 308 Chinese feature films released in China in 2014.

== Box office ==
These are the top 10 grossing Chinese films that were released in China in 2014:

Highest-grossing domestic films of 2014 in China
Rank	Title	Domestic gross
1	Breakup Buddies	$190,120,000
2	The Monkey King	$167,880,000
3	The Taking of Tiger Mountain	$141,110,000
4	Where Are We Going, Dad?	$111,890,000
5	The Breakup Guru	$107,440,000
6	The Continent	$101,080,000
7	Fleet of Time	$94,190,000
8	From Vegas to Macau	$84,590,000
9	Tiny Times 3	$83,370,000
10	Gone with the Bullets	$83,330,000

== Films released ==
=== January–March ===
Opening		Title	Director	Cast	Genre	Notes	Ref.
J A N U A R Y	1	Forever Love	Zhao Yiran, Wei Jie	Li Weijia, Jiang Jo, Teddy Lin, Shen Tingting, Liu Mengmeng, Xia Yiyao, Du Haitao, Peng Bo, Han Yingqun	Drama / Comedy / Romance		
J A N U A R Y	3	As the Light Goes Out	Derek Kwok	Nicholas Tse, Shawn Yue, Simon Yam, Hu Jun, Andy On, William Chan, Bai Bing, Michelle Wai, Liu Kai-chi, Alice Li, Deep Ng, Xian Seli, Siu Yam-yam, Kenny Kwan, Ken Hung, Wang Zhifei, Andrew Lau	Action / Drama / Adventure	Mainland-Hong Kong co-production	
J A N U A R Y	3	Sorry, I Love You	Larry Yang	Vivian Dawson, Swan Wen, Wesley Wong, Jade Lin, Wang Ji, Wu Yujuan	Romance / Drama		
J A N U A R Y	5	Perfect Beyond	Yin Bo	Yan Shuo, Ji Chen, Liu Siyou, Wang Maolei, Mo Xing, Yao Xingzhu, Zhang Yichen	Drama / Comedy		
J A N U A R Y	10	Bitter Love	Li Jide	Wang Dazhi, Wang Erni	Romance / Drama		
J A N U A R Y	10	Forever Young	Lu Gengxu	Pan Yueming, Lu Yulai, Qin Hao, Zhang Xiaochen, Swan Wen, Liu Zi, Du Haitao, Wang Xiaokun, Han Qiuchi, Wang Dongfang, Wang Sisi, Tan Zhuo, Yan Kuan, Yip Sai-wing, Zhang Qi, Cui Jian, Wang Feng, Lu Gengxu	Romance / Drama / Music		
J A N U A R Y	10	Good Morning, Winter Sea	Hu Hanqing	Zhang Ziwen, Ren Rongxuan, Qian Yongchen	Drama		
J A N U A R Y	10	Once Upon a Time in Shanghai	Wong Ching-po	Phillip Ng, Andy On, Michelle Hu, Mao Junjie, Sammo Hung, Jiang Luxia, Chen Kuan-tai, Yuen Cheung-yan, Fung Hark-on, Wen Chao	Action / Drama / Crime	Mainland-Hong Kong co-production	
J A N U A R Y	10	The True Love	Zhou Jun, Yip Wai-ying	Stephy Tang, He Jiong, William So, Zhao Rong, Alex Fong, He Jianyong, Zhao Ke, Ma Zhaozhuang, Huang Zhefeng, Li Hui, Li Gen, Timmy Hung, Luo Zixuan, Akina Hong, Lam Suet, Ding Ling, Zhang Junjie, Jiang Jian	Romance / Drama		
J A N U A R Y	16	Meet the Pegasus	Jian Yaozong	Zu Liqing, Zhang Lin, Bai Baihe, Deng Yuting, Zhao Na, Liang Ying, Liu Hongyun, Gao Quansheng	Animation / Family / Adventure / Comedy		
J A N U A R Y	17	The Apostles	Joe Chien	Josie Ho, Xia Fan, Lam Suet, Zhou Chuchu, Xie Chengjun, Lam Chi-chung	Thriller / Drama		
J A N U A R Y	17	Boonie Bears: To the Rescue	Ding Liang, Liu Fuyuan	Zhang Bingjun, Zhang Wei, Tan Xiao, Chen Guang, Sun Yaodong, Ma Haolun, Wan Danqing, Xin Yuan, Liu Siqi, Zhang Zhiying, Ren Shuyao	Animation / Family / Drama / Adventure / Comedy		
J A N U A R Y	17	Snow Blossom	Koan Hui	Yang Mi, Feng Shaofeng, Yu Chenghui, Zhang Bo	Romance		
J A N U A R Y	18	Dendrobium	Wang Wei	Cheng Guodong, Will Gu, Dai Jiang, Qin Keyan, Li Ang, Kim Eun-jung	Drama	Mainland-South Korea co-production Entered into the 2013 Busan International Film Festival	
J A N U A R Y	21	A Gold Medal Winning Tramp Dog	Mario	Mao Yi, Lv Hongxu, Cui Bing, Wang Lei, Sun Taojie	Drama / Comedy		
J A N U A R Y	23	Balala the Fairies: The Magic Trial	Yu Ren, Liu Hao	Chen Yuwei, Zhao Jinmai, Daisy Cakes, Xu Ke, Wang Hui, Xinel Simpson, Yang Xinyi, Cui Tan	Fantasy / Adventure / Kids		
J A N U A R Y	24	Everlasting Broadcasting	Hu Yaozhi	Zhang Lingxin, Wang Jinsong, Wang Qing, Li Haozhen, Chen Yanyan, Cai Yida, Hu Jiahua, Liu Jinshan, Qi Shilong, Li Mengnan	War / Comedy		
J A N U A R Y	31	Ex-Files	Tian Yusheng	Han Geng, Yao Xingtong, Zheng Kai, Wang Likun, Lee Sang-yeob, Ban Jiajia, Joe Easy, Maggie Wong, Mao Junjie, Xiong Naijin, Zhang Hanyu, Liu Yan	Romance / Drama / Comedy		
J A N U A R Y	31	From Vegas to Macau	Wong Jing	Chow Yun-fat, Nicholas Tse, Jing Tian, Chapman To, Benz Hui, Michael Wong, Gao Hu, Annie Wu, Sammy Sum, Zhang Jin, Tong Fei, Philip Ng, Meng Yao, Michelle Hu, Tony Ho, Bonnie Wong, Winnie Leung	Comedy / Action	Mainland-Hong Kong co-production	
J A N U A R Y	31	The Monkey King	Cheang Pou-soi	Donnie Yen, Aaron Kwok, Chow Yun-fat, Peter Ho, Hai Yitian, Xia Zitong, Joe Chen, Zhang Zilin, Gigi Leung, Kelly Chen, Zheng Jiaxing, Liu Hua, Cheung Siu-fai, Him Law, Louis Fan, Irene Wong, Li Jing, Cathy Leung, Liu Shuangning	Action / Fantasy		
J A N U A R Y	31	U Disk	Xu Zhiqiang	Xiao Yuyu, Yang Long, Tang Aiguo, Bai Yun, Dong Lifan, Yan Guanying, Xin Kai, A Su, Xiao Yaoge, Wei Tingting, Tian Hao, Yang Rui	Drama / Comedy		
J A N U A R Y	31	Where Are We Going, Dad?	Xie Dikui, Lin Yan	Kimi Lin, Cindy Tian, Angela Wang, Guo Zirui, Zhang Yuexuan, Tian Liang, Guo Tao, Jimmy Lin, Wang Yuelun, Zhang Liang, Li Rui, He Jiong	Family / Drama		
F E B R U A R Y	2	Just Another Margin	Jeffrey Lau	Betty Sun, Ronald Cheng, Ekin Cheng, Alex Fong, Ada Choi, Kingdom Yuen, Guo Degang, Lam Suet, Lin Gengxin, Yu Qian, Huang Yi, Hu Ge, Patrick Tam, Lee Kin-yan, Tats Lau	Romance / Fantasy / Comedy		
F E B R U A R Y	14	Beijing Love Story	Chen Sicheng	Chen Sicheng, Tong Liya, Tony Leung Ka-fai, Carina Lau, Yu Nan, Wang Xuebing, Siqin Gaowa, Wang Qingxiang, Elaine Jin, Geng Le, Guo Jingfei	Romance / Drama		
F E B R U A R Y	14	Chrysanthemums Terrace	Fan Xiuming	Xia Yiyao, Huang Hai, Su Mengmeng	Romance / Fantasy / Drama		
F E B R U A R Y	14	The Destiny	Ren Peng	Shen Qiuyu, Shen Tao, Zhang Enqi	Romance / Drama		
F E B R U A R Y	14	The Cabin in the Mountains	Gary Tang	Gregory Wong, Li Xinyue, Mark Du, Ava Yu, Wei Yuhai, Sukie Shek, Gu Shangwei, A Lin	Romance / Mystery	Mainland-Hong Kong co-production	
F E B R U A R Y	14	Love Needs One More Night	Zheng Zhen	Cui Kefa, Xu Xiulin, Lok Tat-wah, Daniel Chan, Qu Aohui	Romance / Drama / Comedy		
F E B R U A R Y	14	Unexpected Love	Bowie Lau	Du Chun, Liu Ying, Chen Tingjia, Wang Yang, Wang Yan, Ocean Hai, Gao Jian, Yu Angyu, Gao Hu, Nana, Ba Dou, Yue Xiaojun, Peng Bo, Shi Tianqi, Jill Hsu, Ma Wenlong, Nelson Cheung, Frieda Hu	Drama / Romance		
F E B R U A R Y	21	People Searching Story of Cola Lee	Zhou Wei	Yu Entai, Tan Zhuo, Wang Lanfei, Li Yu, Qin Weidong, Gao Yalin, Lin Dongfu, Miumiu, Ma Shuliang, Zhao Ningyu, Liu Xiyuan, Tong Yue	Drama / Comedy		
F E B R U A R Y	21	Shining Soul	Dai Wei	Si Ligeng, Chen Yuan, David Dai, Li Wei	Thriller / Horror / Crime		
F E B R U A R Y	21	The Struggle of 80's	Seng Dao	Zhang Jianing, Liu Shuailiang, Yang Dong, He Saifei, Xu Huanshan, Ma Dehua, Cao Bingkun, Hou Yong, Zhang Haotian	Drama		
F E B R U A R Y	28	Final Battle in Chengzigou of Kongfu Saga	Han Wanfeng	Chu Yingying, Liu Yijiang, Xue Jiangtao	Action / Drama		
F E B R U A R Y	28	General's Goblet	Chen Xiaolei	Wang Hongxiang, Weng Chia-ming, Wang Ji, Ping An, Chunyu Shanshan, Fan Junhan, Li Pengfei, Wang Tong, Li Xiaozhou, Fan Jun, Guo Chendong	Action / Drama		
M A R C H	4	Lock Me Up, Tie Him Down	Jeffrey Lau	Vivian Hsu, He Jiong, Wang Xuebing, Jiang Mengjie, Kara Hui, Frankie Chan, Li Jing, Harriet Yeung, Wu Chenchen, Bolin Chen, Michelle Chen	Drama / Comedy		
M A R C H	7	The Old Cinderella	Wu Bai	Zhang Jingchu, Kenji Wu, Pan Yueming, Ban Jiajia, Zhu Zhu, Baron Chen, Xiong Naijin	Romance / Drama		
M A R C H	7	Pretty Maid	Hai Da	Ma Lingyan, Zhang Hongjie, Shi Lan, Ma Yue, Liu Xiaowei, Zhu Yuwen	Family		
M A R C H	7	You Are the One	Baek Seung-hoon	Hu Bing, Liu Tao, Ma Jingyi, Joon Choi	Romance / Drama		
M A R C H	8	The Land Is So Rich in Beauty	Xiao Feng	Ying Yuefei, Duan Fengjiao, Ling Xiao, Wu Na, Lin Yihang, Da Jiang, Ding Lintao	Romance / War		
M A R C H	14	The Extreme Fox	Wellson Chin	Alex Fong, Chrissie Chau, Renata Tan, Lam Suet, A-Wei, Huang Junqi, Zhang Jianbo, Tsai Zifen, Yang Zehu, Meng Weiming, Hao Zaidong, He Meitian, Jia Kangxi, Yin Hailong, Fan Fulin	Romance / Drama / Comedy / Ancient-Costume	Mainland-Hong Kong co-production	
M A R C H	20	Limi Girl	Zhang Ruoyi	Shi Yan, Huaqin Cairang, Lu Xinzhi, Li Yuqian, Luo Shiping, Lan Ting	Romance / Drama		
M A R C H	20	Shigeshoshi	Wu Ma	Miu Miu, Ryan Zuo, Wu Ma, Shang Hua, Wang Xiwei, Gao Weiguang, Stanley Fung, Xie Yunhong	Thriller / Drama / Comedy		
M A R C H	21	Black Coal, Thin Ice	Diao Yinan	Liao Fan, Gwei Lun-mei, Wang Xuebing, Wang Jingchun, Yu Ailei, Ni Jingyang	Crime / Drama / Mystery	Won the Golden Bear for Best Film at the 64th Berlin International Film Festival	
M A R C H	21	Fighting	Yu Junhao	Lu Yi, Peter Ho, Wei Yi, Wu Ma, Lam Wai, Hou Yong, Yvonne Yung	Romance / Action		
M A R C H	21	Last Flight	Vincent Zhou	Ed Westwick, Zhu Zhu, Emily Sansiri, Leon Lee, Cary Kazemi, Johann Helf, Alexander Winters	Sci-fi / Action		
M A R C H	21	Police Diary	Ning Jing	Wang Jingchun, Sun Liang	Drama	Entered into the 2013 Tokyo International Film Festival	
M A R C H	28	Happiness Inn	Zhou Qi, Wang Xuankun	Song Ziqiao, Zhao Hanxue, Wang Qianhang, Diao Chengyu, Li Zheng, Ding Xihe, Wang Lele, Duan Haochen	Drama / Comedy		
M A R C H	28	On the Way	Kim Poog-ki	Huang Shengyi, Wen Zhang, Ji Jin-hee, Cha Soo-yeon, Zhai Wenbin, Zhang Shaohua	Romance / Drama	Mainland-South Korea co-production	

=== April–June ===
Opening		Title	Director	Cast	Genre	Notes	Ref.
A P R I L	4	Death Is Here 3	Guan Er	Yu Xintian, Guo Yan, Guo Xin, Lang Peng, Fu Man, Xu Fei, Wu Yunfei, Jaci Fu, Ka Ka, Zheng Huixin	Thriller / Horror / Mystery		
A P R I L	4	Super Three	Fu Yan	Han Bo, Liu Pei, Ze Fei, Liu Yujing, Ke Detao, Zhao Wenjun	Animation / Comedy		
A P R I L	4	The Truth About Beauty	Lam Oi-wah	Bai Baihe, Ronald Cheng, Zhang Yao, Guo Jingfei	Drama	Mainland-Hong Kong co-production	
A P R I L	11	Ameera	Xu Honghui	Ambrose Hui, Melrose Hu, Paul Chun, Andrew Lin, Bryan Leung, Cao Yang, Ray An, Ham So-won, Collin Chou, Lee Kin-yan	Action / Mystery		
A P R I L	11	Good Love Again	Gao Yang	He Gang, Liu Dong, Zhao Lu, Liu Weibo, Alan Ng	Comedy / Romance	Entered into the 2013 Macau International Movie Festival	
A P R I L	11	Long's Story	Li Ao	Steve Yoo, Liu Yun, Lan Yan, Wang Yiming, Dick Wei, Lee Kin-yan	Comedy / Family		
A P R I L	11	Love and Hate From Cyber	Zhao Zhiping	He Yumeng, Pan Yi-an, Sang Wei-lin, Sun Zuyang	Comedy / Romance		
A P R I L	11	Xue Cai	Zhang Jilong	Liu Tingyu, Lee Wei, Lv Pingying, Wang Fang, Zhang Heng	Drama / Mystery / Thriller		
A P R I L	15	Phurbu & Tenzin	Fu Dongyu	Lawang Lop, Ngawang Rinchen, Sonam Dolgar, Yang Xue, Duo Bujie	Drama / History		
A P R I L	16	The Search of Sounds	Zhang Chenting	Shao Lijun, Li Zhenghao, Ding Leyi	Drama		
A P R I L	18	Eternal Love	Mak Wing-lun, He Zhenhua	Li Xiaomeng, Zou Dongxiao, Gai Xi, Wong Yut-fei, Mimi Chu	Romance		
A P R I L	18	Stealing Legend	Che Jingxing	Tian Liang, Zhou Xianxin, Li Jing, Li Taiyan, Gao Yaxuan, Yan Bingyan	Action / Drama		
A P R I L	18	The Suspicious	Zhang Cheng	Alec Su, Joe Chen, Wilson Lam, Hong So-hee, Liu Hua, Wang Xun, Yue Xiaojun, Chun Hsiung Ko, You Liping, Koji Yano	Romance / Mystery / Comedy		
A P R I L	25	Iceman	Law Wing-cheung	Donnie Yen, Wang Baoqiang, Huang Shengyi, Simon Yam, Yu Kang, Lam Suet, Zhang Shaohua, Benny Chan, Hu Ming, Gregory Wong, Jacquelin Chong, Mark Wu, Ava Yu, Alice Chan, Lo Hoi-pang, Wong Man-wai, Chen Huihui, Bao Yumeng	Comedy / Action / Fantasy	Mainland-Hong Kong co-production	
A P R I L	25	My Old Classmate	Frant Gwo	Zhou Dongyu, Lin Gengxin, Mike Sui, Wang Xiaokun, Gong Geer, Li Mincheng, Zhao Siyuan, Cao Yang	Drama / Romance		
A P R I L	29	The Great Hypnotist	Leste Chen	Xu Zheng, Karen Mok, Hu Jing, Lü Zhong, Wang Yaoqing	Drama / Mystery / Thriller		
A P R I L	30	Ikkyû san	Lei Jiancheng, Wu Jianzhong	Wang Xiaoyan, Luo Yujuan, Li Zhengxiang, Zhang Xin, Liu Beichen, Wang Xiaotong, Liu Bin	Animation / Suspense	Mainland-Japan co-production	
A P R I L	30	Let Go for Love	Aman Chang	Chapman To, Charlene Choi, Luo Shi, Nian Xianer, Gao Jun, Li Mengqian, Tang Guozhong, Huang Yali	Comedy / Romance		
M A Y	7	Enchanted Doll	Wang Song	Zheng Hao, Yang Caiqi, Kan Qingzi, Jia Wei	Mystery / Thriller		
M A Y	8	Forbidden Kiss	Tian Fen	Li Xiaolu, John Robinson, Wang Ji, Lu Fei, Ding Jianjun, Zhang Weixin	Romance	Entered into the 2012 New York City International Film Festival	
M A Y	9	A Mysterious Bullet	Sun Tie	Dong Yong, Wu Gang, Zhang Xuanhe, Li Sibo, Liu Yi, Liu Jixun	Drama / Mystery / War		
M A Y	9	Deslie for Young	Ma Yong	Wu Haoze, Zhang Yanjing, He Tingxian, Li Xiapei, Zhao Bin, Wang Xiaomao, Qu Guoqiang, Yang Xiaotong, Qu Lingzi, Yu Duo	Drama		
M A Y	16	Coming Home	Zhang Yimou	Chen Daoming, Gong Li, Zhang Huiwen, Guo Tao, Liu Peiqi, Zu Feng, Yan Ni, Xin Baiqing, Zhang Jiayi, Chen Xiaoyi, Ding Jiali	Drama / Romance / History		
M A Y	16	Love at First Sight	Li Ni	Julian Chen, Cici Hong, Liu Yixuan, Jiang Wu, Luo Liqun, Huang Jue, Liu Chao, He Lin	Romance		
M A Y	16	Urban Games	Bob Brown, Zhang Peng	Shawn Dou, Michelle Chen, Ashton Chen, Ye Qing, Cica Zhou, Juno	Action / Thriller	Mainland-United States co-production	
M A Y	16	To Love Somebody	Francis Sung	Tong Yao, Shen Lin, Qiao Zhenyu, Michael Tong, Fang Zibin, Wang Yi, Tong Lei, Li Chengyuan, Zhao Siyuan, Ma Xiaocan	Romance		
M A Y	20	Broadcasting Girl	Cheng Zhonghao, Wang Kai	Jiro Wang, Qi Wei, Angela Qiu, Jiang Xueming, Zhong Kai, Gao Haoyuan, Xu Xiaolong, Ren Haoming	Comedy / Romance		
M A Y	23	Impetuous Love in Action	Frankie Chan	Oscar Sun, Jade Lin, Kenneth Ma, Yu Shu, Frankie Chan, Irene Wan, Lisi Danni, Zheng Guolin	Comedy / Action / Romance	Mainland-Hong Kong co-production	
M A Y	23	Love Suspicion	Li Weijie	Ju Ji-hoon, Jill Hsu, Liu Zhixi, Zhang Yaxi, Lu Jiahao, Xu Huiwen	Mystery / Thriller		
M A Y	23	Who Is Undercover	Zhai Junjie, Zhai Xiaoxing	Jiang Qinqin, Liu Xiaofeng, Sun Qian, Zhang Yao, Murray Clive, Morni Chang, Guo Jinglin, Lin Dongfu, Liu Xin, Huang Wei, Zhai Wanchen, Xue Shan	Drama / Action / Mystery		
M A Y	27	Closed Doors Village	Xing Bo	David Chen, Xu Dongdong, Tino Bao, Yue Xiaojun, Wang Liang, Song Rui, Tian Tian	Thriller / Horror / Mystery		
M A Y	27	Mr. Charming	Wang Meng	Nian Xianer, Chen Xiaoyan, Sammy Lau, Wylie Chiu, Chen Xian, Li Yahong, Chang Kuan, Angela An, Lin Kai, Gu Youming, Hu Jiaai, Wan Li, Li Chun	Comedy / Romance / Fantasy		
M A Y	29	Overheard 3	Alan Mak, Felix Chong	Sean Lau, Louis Koo, Daniel Wu, Zhou Xun, Michelle Ye, Alex Fong, Kenneth Tsang, Ng Man-tat, Huang Lei, Lam Ka-tung, Dominic Lam, Stephen Au, Kwok Fung, Felix Lok, Huang Yi, Chin Ka-lok, Vincent Kok, Law Lan	Action / Suspense / Thriller / Crime	Mainland-Hong Kong co-production	
M A Y	30	The Adventures of Sinbad 2	Gu Peixin, Benpineko	Yang Ou, Huang Ying, Yang Menglu, Xie Tiantian, Xia Lei	Comedy / Animation / Adventure		
M A Y	30	Happy Little Submarines 4: Adventure of Octopus	He Zili	Jiang Ke, Wang Xiaotong, Li Ye, Sun Ningfang, Fan Churong, Hong Haitian, Xie Yuanzhen, Hu Qian, Liu Beichen, Zhou Nanfei, Yan Lizhen, Tan Mantang, Zhai Wei	Comedy / Animation / Adventure		
M A Y	30	Magic Wonderland	Wu Jianrong, Fang Lei	Yi Yi, Ge Yuying, Yang Ying, Ling Juan, Zhang Lu, Guo Zhengjian, Lin Qiang, Li Yao, Zhang Meijuan, Wang Guannan	Animation / Fantasy / Adventure		
M A Y	30	New Minesweepers Warfare: Courageous Boy	Yang Guangfu, Jiang Huiyan	Ma Yingzhe, Juan Zi, Su Yu, Lin Qiang, Liang Zi, Chen Dagang, Liang Xiaoqiang, Ma Yufei, Chen Chen	Animation / Children / War		
M A Y	31	GG Bond 2	Gu Zhibin, Lu Jinming	Lu Shuang, Zu Qing, Chen Zhirong, Xu Jingwei	Comedy / Animation / Adventure		
M A Y	31	I Am a Wolf	Yu Shengjun	Huang Bo, Liu Xuan, Xue Jianing, Fu Xinbo, Lu Haojie, Li Jiayi	Animation / Drama		
M A Y	31	Space Panda 2	Zheng Chengfeng	Yi Xiaoyin, Ao Lei, Zuo Xinqi, Li Su, Lei Gui, Zhang Xinyu	Comedy / Animation / Fantasy / Adventure		
J U N E	1	Feeling the Love Flute	Den Yinghai	Lin Hao, Niu Ben, Lam Wai, Wen Xiang, Su Jin, Guo Jin, Gao Qiang, Chi Zhiqiang	Music / Children		
J U N E	6	The Break-Up Artist	Zhang Zili	Lin Peng, Van Fan, Steve Seungjun Yoo, Jade Lin, Jiu Kong, Shera Li, Luo Haiqiong, Li Lin, Cao Difei, Zhang Zilin, Jack Kao, Samuel Tai, Chou Huei, Mickey Huang, NoNo	Comedy / Romance		
J U N E	6	Breaking the Waves	Patrick Leung	Huang Xiaoming, Joe Chen, Huang Xuan, Eric Tsang, Shao Bing, Dong Xuan, Yu Xiaowei, Xie Jingjing, Annie Wu, Guo Meimei	Romance		
J U N E	6	Night of Adventure	Li Jixian	Yan Ni, Geng Le, Shao Bing, Bao Bei'er, Li Jing, Qiao Renliang, Li Jiaxuan, Feng Xinyao	Comedy		
J U N E	13	Midnight Hair	Liu Ning	Daniella Wang, Lee Wei, Xuan Lu, Yang Zitong, Dai Xiangyu, Sun Guitian, Erma Yina	Mystery / Thriller		
J U N E	14	Dream at the Age of 86	Li Manhua	Li Ange, Qian Youping, Li Dongdong	Documentary / Family		
J U N E	20	Face Hunter	Guoyong Wu	Purba Rgyal, Cheng Yuanyuan, Han Dantong, Shu Yaoxuan, Liu Lu, Yu Peng, Xiang Ding	Romance / Suspense / Thriller		
J U N E	20	Night Mail	Li Yu	Ren Quan, Qiao Renliang, Zhang Yangguoer, Li Yu, Zhou Hong, Cao Yang, Bai Yao	Mystery / Crime		
J U N E	27	The Breakup Guru	Yu Baimei, Deng Chao	Deng Chao, Yang Mi, Gulnazar, Luan Yuanhui, Qin Yue, Xu Kejia, Liang Chao, Zhao Manzu, Betty Sun, Liu Yan, Xie Nan	Drama / Comedy / Romance		
J U N E	27	Poseidon Code	Qiao Heping, Luo Yue	Peter Stormare, Maria Kania, Cynthia Khan, Xu Guangyu, Wang Shuangbao, Peng Bo, Zhang Xu, Cao Yan, Ren Zewei	Action / Adventure		

=== July–September ===
Opening		Title	Director	Cast	Genre	Notes	Ref.
J U L Y	4	Bunshinsaba 3	Ahn Byeong-ki	Jiang Yiyan, Jiao Junyan, Wang Longhua, Dong Zijian, Xu Ang, Zhao Zixuan, Rong Yi	Mystery / Thriller		
J U L Y	4	The Predictor Paul	Shi Yang	Hao Xianghai, Zhang Wei, Xu Jing	Comedy / Romance / Animation / Fantasy		
J U L Y	4	A Simple Hero	Ouyang Fenqiang	Ou Di, Yang Shuting, Chen Taishen, Tian Yuan, Melissa Wang	Comedy / Romance / Adventure		
J U L Y	5	Ami Chogbo	Ya Ni	Liu Qi, Shi Yuanting, Murray Clive, Wang Zhuocuo, Pan Yanfei	Drama / Sport		
J U L Y	10	My Geeky Nerdy Buddies	Kevin Chu	Jam Hsiao, Maggie Jiang, Da Peng, Xie Na, Chen Bor-jeng, Cai Weijia, Lan Chang, Shanny A, Popping Kuang, Wu Chung-tien, Tony Chen, Lin Mei-shiu	Comedy / Romance	Mainland-Taiwan co-production	
J U L Y	10	Old Boys: The Way of the Dragon	Xiao Yang	Xiao Yang, Wang Taili, Qu Jingjing, Wanting Qu	Drama / Comedy		
J U L Y	10	Roco Kingdom 3	Gong Bingsi	Yang Ying, Yan Mengmeng, Huang Zhenji, Shan Xin, Tang Xiaoxi, Zhang Lei, Gao Zengzhi, Zhao Shuren, Guo Zhengjian, Zhao Zhen, Guo Sheng, Ban Chuang	Animation / Fantasy / Adventure		
J U L Y	10	Seer 4	Wang Zhangjun, Yin Yuqi	Yang Ou, Zhang Anqi, Fan Junhang, Meng Xianglong, You Jun, Yuan Guoqing, Su Xin, Jia Zhichao, Xia Lei, Liu Qin, Yang Menglu	Drama / Animation / Children / Adventure		
J U L Y	11	Caught in Trap	Lee Tso-nam	Bowie Lam, Che Xiao, Li Qiang, Guo Wei, He Qiang	Drama / Romance / Mystery / Crime		
J U L Y	17	Tiny Times 3	Guo Jingming	Yang Mi, Ko Chen-tung, Amber Kuo, Chen Xuedong, Haden Kuo, Xie Yilin, Lee Hyun-jae, Vivian Dawson, Ming Ren, Wang Lin, Jiang Chao, Shang Kan, Calvin Tu	Drama / Comedy / Romance		
J U L Y	18	Happy Heroes 2 Qiyuan Planet Wars	Huang Weiming	Zu Qing, Gao Quansheng, Liu Hongyun, Deng Yuting, Yan Yanzi, Li Tuan, Zhang Lin	Animation / Adventure		
J U L Y	18	The House That Never Dies	Raymond Yip	Francis Ng, Ruby Lin, Tony Yang, Qin Hailu, Monica Mok, Li Jing, Pat Ha, Elaine Jin, Yuen Cheung-yan, Li Xiaochuan, Han Zhi	Drama / Mystery / Thriller		
J U L Y	24	The Continent	Han Han	Feng Shaofeng, Bolin Chen, Wallace Chung, Wang Luodan, Yuan Quan, Joe Chen, Jia Zhangke, White. K, Kong Lianshun, Zack Gao	Comedy / Romance / Adventure		
J U L Y	25	The Magical Brush	Frankie Chung	Shao Yichen, Meng Xianglong, Hong Haitian, Leo Wu, Guo Yifeng, Wu Wenlun	Animation / Fantasy		
J U L Y	25	No Zuo No Die	Fan Lixin	Hua Chenyu, Ou Oho, Congo Pax, Ning Huanyu, Yu Tan, Zhang Yangyang, Rao Wei, Zuo Li, Jia Shengqiang, Yu Menglong, Fan Shiqi, Jurat	Drama / Documentary		
J U L Y	30	Girls	Wong Chun-chun	Ivy Chen, Fiona Sit, Yang Zishan, Shawn Yue, Wallace Chung, Vanness Wu	Comedy / Romance		
J U L Y	31	Dragon Nest: Warriors' Dawn	Song Yuefeng	Hu Ge, Jing Tian, Xu Jiao, Xia Zitong	Romance / Animation / Fantasy / Adventure		
J U L Y	31	The White Haired Witch of Lunar Kingdom	Jacob Cheung	Fan Bingbing, Huang Xiaoming, Vincent Zhao, Wang Xuebing, Ni Dahong, Tong Yao, Li Ruxin, Cecilia Yip, Yan Yikuan, John Do, Lai Xiaosheng	Action / Romance / Fantasy / Martial Arts / Costume	Mainland-Hong Kong co-production	
A U G U S T	1	Are You Ready to Marry Me	Che Jingxing	Dylan Kuo, Chrissie Chau, Cica Zhou, Li Bin, Gao Yaxuan, Liao Jingsheng, Annie Tang, Qu Ying, Bai Xue, Frank Fan, Viona Wang	Comedy / Romance		
A U G U S T	7	Brotherhood of Blades	Lu Yang	Chang Chen, Liu Shishi, Wang Qianyuan, Ethan Li, Nie Yuan, Chin Shih-chieh, Ye Qing, Zhou Yiwei, Zhu Dan, Zhao Lixin	Action / Romance / Martial Arts / Costume		
A U G U S T	8	All About Puberty	Wang Dan	Xu Jiawei, Chang Cheng, Zhang Lei, Miao Miao, Yuan Yixin, Cao Nan, Zhang Hanqiao	Comedy / Romance		
A U G U S T	8	Die Xian Gui Tan	Wang Yi	Alex Fong, Liu Xiaojia, Apple Hong, Han Xuewei, Chen Qiao, Yao Yi-ai, Yin Shanshan, Liu Ling, Sun Jian, Liu Xiang-jing, Ma Kaiman	Thriller		
A U G U S T	8	The Legend of Qin	Shen Leping	Feng Junhua, Ji Guanlin, Shen Dawei, Liu Qin, Zhou Ji, Liu Qin, Zhang Jiayi, Wu Lei, Huang Ying, Wang Xiaobing, Cheng Yuzhu, Meng Xianglong, You Jun, Di Feifei, Zhao Qianjing, Zhong Youdao	Animation / Fantasy / Adventure / Martial Arts		
A U G U S T	8	When a Peking Family Meets Aupair	Chen Gang	Xu Fan, Chen Jianbin, Chen Yinuo, Gia Nina, Sun Honglei, Guo Tao, Tong Liya, Wang Qianyuan, Zhang Xiaolong, Fann Wong, Christopher Lee, Jin Zhiwen, Wu Qianqian, Sun Guitian	Drama / Comedy / Family		
A U G U S T	8	Yugo & Lala 2	Wang Yunfei	Liu Xiaoyu, Meng Quanlin, Lu Kui, Lin Qiang, Yang Tianxiang, Feng Sheng, Song Ming	Animation / Family / Adventure		
A U G U S T	15	A Stupid Journey	Jiang Zhuoyuan	Zheng Kai, Oscar Sun, Pan Zhilin, Josephine Yu, Wu Ma, Law Kar-ying, Lee Kin-yan, Wang Xun, He Yunwei, Yin Zhusheng, Yang Haoyu, Gao Baobao, Xia Jiawei, Cai Die, Chen Zheng, Jing Hao	Comedy / Costume		
A U G U S T	15	Love Evolutionism	Liu Rongyan	Duan Yihong, Haden Kuo, Leon Dai, Cya Liu, Xie Yilin, Xie Nan, Feng Xinyao	Comedy / Romance		
A U G U S T	15	Meeting the Giant	Tay Ping Hui	Delvin Goh, Chua Seng Jin, Michael Lee, Lim Shengyu, Ian Fang, Hanbin Ng, Zhuyan Manzi, Jack Choo, Wang Shuo, Bernard Tan, Na Guangzi	Drama / Sports	Mainland-Singapore co-production	
A U G U S T	15	Mr. Lucky	Han Zhao	Jordan Chan, Ady An, Liu Han, Ni Jingyang, Wang Xun, Yang Yi, Liu Yajin, Wang Yadi, Long Meizi, Leng Mo, Wang Xiaotian	Comedy / Romance		
A U G U S T	15	Scent	Jessey Tsang	Park Si-hoo, Chen Ran, An Hu, Li Xiangxiang, Shim Ji-won, Qi Yaling, Yin Yezi, Lao Bao, Hai Yang	Romance		
A U G U S T	15	The Scroll of Wing Chun White Crane	Bryan Leung	Shen Fangxi, Zhao Cong, Kent Tong, Cheng Pei-pei, Wong Yut-fei, Bryan Leung, Long Wu, Robert Gilabert Cuenca, Jerry Liau, Yang Zheng	Comedy / Action / Romance		
A U G U S T	21	Snow White: The Power of Dwarfs	Adam Qiu	Chen Qing	Comedy / Animation / Fantasy / Adventure		
A U G U S T	22	Fall in Love with You	Hu Chuxi	Du Haitao, Shen Mengchen, Fan Jun, Liu Yingxia, Ji Meichen	Comedy / Romance		
A U G U S T	22	The Four III	Gordon Chan, Janet Chun	Deng Chao, Liu Yifei, Collin Chou, Ronald Cheng, Anthony Wong, Jiang Yiyan, Liu Yan, Wu Xiubo, Sheren Tang, Waise Lee, Alec Su, Yu Chenghui, Bao Bei'er, Xiang Tianran, Gui Gui, Lawrence Lau	Action / Romance / Suspense / Martial Arts		
A U G U S T	22	Next Station I Love You	Li Dewei	Steven Ma, Yang Ziyan, Makiyo Kawashima, Ching Siu-lung, Liu Xin	Drama / Romance	Entered into the 2014 Shanghai International Film Festival	
A U G U S T	22	Under the Bed 2	Yuan Jie	Abby Yin, Li Henan, Chen Yuan, Song Wei, Chen Jiamin, Cynthia Sun, Li Zhuoyuan, Zhong Chao	Suspense / Thriller		
A U G U S T	26	Fragrance of Flowers	Ouyang Fenqiang	Liu Yajin, Yang Lei, Yan An, Ping An, Zheng Chuangyi, Ouyang Wenxin	Romance		
A U G U S T	28	Da Chou	Duan Qingmin	Fan Jun, Shi Meixiang, Xu Na, Guo Da	Drama / Opera		
A U G U S T	28	Turn Around	Alex Zhang, Wang Wei	Leon Jay Williams, Liu Yuxin, Liu Yuqi, Xu Li, Du Changrui, Shone An, Ji Minjia, Ivan Huang	Comedy / Romance		
A U G U S T	29	Forgetting to Know You	Quan Ling	Tao Hong, Guo Xiaodong, Wang Ziyi, Zhang Yibai	Drama / Family	Entered into the 63rd Berlin International Film Festival	
A U G U S T	29	Live with a Thief	Liu Xiaochun	Van Fan, Chen Tingjia, Zhang Yao, Shi Lijia, Lu Shan	Romance / Suspense		
A U G U S T	29	The Buddha's Shadow	Zheng Yang	Lai Xi, Jiang Chao, Leung Siu-lung, Yuen Wah, Law Kar-ying, Lu Yuanyuan, Gong Beibi	Comedy / Action / Adventure		
A U G U S T	29	The Summer of Our Graduation	Yu Hanqiu	Jenny Zhang, Kenneth Tsang, Wowkie Zhang, Wu Jianfei, Waise Lee, Hong Jiantao, Zhao Tieren	Drama / Comedy / Romance		
A U G U S T	29	Youth.com	Ma Yong	Gu Lina, Qu Guoqiang, Sun Xiyao, Tao Yujie, Yan Meng, Lu Xiaolu, Ma Yiao	Drama / Romance / Suspense		
S E P T E M B E R	5	But Always	Snow Zou	Nicholas Tse, Gao Yuanyuan, Du Haitao, Alice Li, Lam Suet, Che Xiao, Li Wenling, Shi Pengyuan, Shi Xinyi, Qin Hao, Anya Wu, Tong Dawei, Jack Kao, Zang Tianshuo	Romance	Mainland-Hong Kong co-production	
S E P T E M B E R	5	Mo Deng Sen Lin Zhi Mei Shi Zong Dong Yuan	Shu Zhan	Feng Junhua, Ni Chunjia, Yang Ou, Liu Yuxuan, Shen Dawei	Comedy / Animation / Adventure		
S E P T E M B E R	5	Once Upon a Time in the Old Bridge	Zhang Li	Yu Haoming, An Jin-kyoung, Xu Huanshan, Jiang Kai, Sui Yongliang, Lv Jingjing	Suspense / Costume		
S E P T E M B E R	6	Tale of the Rally	Zheng Chongxin	Zhang Lin, Yan Yanzi, Li Tuan, Zu Qing, Liu Hongyun, Deng Yuting, Zhao Na, Gao Quansheng	Comedy / Animation / Family		
S E P T E M B E R	10	One Day	Li Ruijun, Yi Xiaoxing, Tian Yuan, Wang Daqing, Liu Yonghong, Du Bo, Tong Zhijian, Jiang Ying, Yang Zhilin	Ady An, Feng Jiayi, Feng Shaofeng, Han Geng, Siqin Gaowa, Wang Qianyuan, Xiong Naijin, Xu Fan, Yong Mei, Mabel Yuan, Zhang Hanyu, Zhou Xun	Drama / Children		
S E P T E M B E R	11	King Tea Storm	Meng Weiguo	Yang Zi, Tu Shengcheng, Erma Yina, He Xiang, Ji Tao, Lan Haoyu, Yan Yanlong	Drama / Romance	Entered into the 2014 Shanghai International Film Festival	
S E P T E M B E R	12	Inside the Girls	Liang Ting	Wen Xin, Cheng Yi, Zhao Duona, Andrew Yin, Jelly Zhao, Jing Gangshan, Wang Qianyi, Du Shuangyu	Suspense / Thriller		
S E P T E M B E R	12	Mountain Ava	Willie Ying	Liu Ziman, Hu Tianyang, Chang Haibo, Cheng Yaohui	Drama / Children / Adventure		
S E P T E M B E R	12	You Are My Sassy Girl	Zheng Li	Terry Shi, Mo Xier, Kenneth Tsang, Lam Wai, Yi Liqi, Jin Yi, Tu Yanni, Wang Wenqi	Comedy / Action / Romance		
S E P T E M B E R	12	Zero Point Five Love	Xing Xiao	Purba Rgyal, Jessie Chiang, Li Yueming, Gong Jie	Romance		
S E P T E M B E R	16	Ashes to Ashes	Wu Qin	Hou Changrong, Zhou Bozhen, Shi Feng, Xu Qingyu, Zhao Dongyao, Zhu Mengting, Xu Youbin, Su Xin, Henry Huo, Zhong Xiaoping	Comedy / Children		
S E P T E M B E R	18	The Eyes of Dawn	Bruce Le	Cheng Pei-pei, Marsha Yuen, Kenneth Tsang, Bruce Le, Li Yixuan, Sun Zhongyi, Yuen Wor-chun, Yao Meiyi	Drama / History / War		
S E P T E M B E R	19	The Deathday Party	Eddie Tse	Anita Yuen, Archie Kao, Xiong Naijin, Zhang Zimu	Drama / Mystery		
S E P T E M B E R	19	The Eighth House	Zhang Li	Tino Bao, Ni Jingyang, Chang Le, Da Qing, Lin Peng	Suspense / Thriller / Horror		
S E P T E M B E R	19	One Step Away	Zhao Baogang	Sun Honglei, Gwei Lun-mei, Alex Fong, Xu Jinglei, Huang Lei, Jiang Qinqin, Ada Choi, Xi Meijuan, Fang Jun, Duanmu Chonghui, Li Hua, Tan Kai	Romance / War		
S E P T E M B E R	25	Genuine Love	Xirzat Yahup, Zhang Xin	Kunduzai Tasi, Baihetiyaer Eziz	Drama / Family		
S E P T E M B E R	26	Dearest	Peter Chan	Zhao Wei, Huang Bo, Tong Dawei, Hao Lei, Zhang Yi, Zhang Yuqi, Zhang Guoqiang, Zhu Dongxu, Yi Qing, Wang Zhifei	Drama / Family	Mainland-Hong Kong co-production	
S E P T E M B E R	26	Secret Plans	He Cheng	Liu Chunyan, Dong Hao, Ju Ping, Geng Chenchen, Chen Su, Huo Xiaolei	Animation / Family / Child		
S E P T E M B E R	30	Breakup Buddies	Ning Hao	Huang Bo, Xu Zheng, Yuan Quan, Zhou Dongyu, Tao Hui, Yue Xiaojun, Shen Teng, Zhang Li, Ma Su, Liu Meihan, Wang Yanhui, Jiao Junyan, Guo Tao, Li Chen, Xiong Naijin, Xia Yu, Liu Yiwei, Lei Jiayin, Yong Mengting, Liang Hao	Comedy / Romance	Entered into the 2014 Toronto International Film Festival	

=== October–December ===
Opening		Title	Director	Cast	Genre	Notes	Ref.
O C T O B E R	1	Armor Hero Atlas	Zheng Guowei	Xu Feng, Cao Xiyue, Kenny Zeng, Li Xinze, Zhu Jiaqi, Li Honglei, Long Nv, Yan Hongyu, Jia Yuting, Shen Bo, Wu Yonggan, Geng Yi	Drama / Action / Sci-fi		
O C T O B E R	1	Black & White: The Dawn of Justice	Tsai Yueh-hsun	Mark Chao, Lin Gengxin, Huang Bo, Janine Chang, Hsiu Chieh-kai, Terri Kwan, Jason Tsou, Mandy Lieu, Gulnazar	Drama / Action / Crime	Mainland-Taiwan co-production	
O C T O B E R	1	Farm House II	Xu Kerr	Shen Dawei, Feng Junhua, Cu Cu, Liu Yuxuan, Yang Menglu, Xia Lei, Xie Tiantian, Su Xin, Ni Kang, Wang Yuhang, Yang Ou, Hai Fang	Comedy / Animation / Family / Adventure		
O C T O B E R	1	The Golden Era	Ann Hui	Tang Wei, Feng Shaofeng, Wang Zhiwen, Zhu Yawen, Huang Xuan, Hao Lei, Yuan Quan, Tian Yuan, Ding Jiali, Wang Qianyuan, Sha Yi, Zu Feng, Zhang Yi, Feng Lei, Yuan Wenkang, Chen Yuemo, Wang Ziyi, Zhang Jiayi, Wang Jingchun, Yang Xue, Jiao Gang, Zhang Bo, Zhang Yao, Ke Lan, Tang Yixin	Drama / Romance / Biography	Mainland-Hong Kong co-production	
O C T O B E R	1	The Lost 15 Boys: The Big Adventure on Pirates' Island	Ba Yunfeng, Zhang Bing	Li Miao, Yu Peixuan, Zhou Yongxi, Xiao Kaifei, Zhang Mingxue	Drama / Animation / Adventure		
O C T O B E R	1	Kuiba III	Wang Chuan, Zhang Gang, Zhou Jie	Liu Jingluo, Yao Shu, Wang Yuteng, Yang Chen, Liu Xiaoyu, Wang Kai, Ao Lei, Shi Kunkun, Song Ming, Ma Haifeng, Yang Ning, A Jie, Fan Zhechen, Tute Hameng, Jiang Guangtao	Action / Animation / Fantasy / Adventure		
O C T O B E R	1	McDull – Me & My Mum	Brian Tse, Li Junmin	Sandra Ng, Anthony Wong, Babyjohn Choi, Huang Lei, Li Yundi, The Pancakes, Zhang Zhengzhong	Comedy / Animation / Family	Mainland-Hong Kong co-production	
O C T O B E R	3	Shi Er Sheng Xiao Cheng Shi Ying Xiong	Ge Haitao	Su Qianyun, Ding Runqi, Wang Yan, Xie Lili	Comedy / Animation		
O C T O B E R	10	Bugs	Yan Jia	Xia Zitong, Zhang Zilin, Eric Wang, Sphinx Ting	Sci-fi / Thriller / Disaster		
O C T O B E R	10	Young Friend Forever	Zhao Chong	Sun Qian, Li Tai, Peng Bo, Tang Jingmei, Zhang Qun, Li Ruojia, Wu Hong	Romance		
O C T O B E R	14	Ex Fighting	Lu Yang	Andrew Lin, Xiong Naijin, Ma Yuan, Lam Suet, Zhu Dan, Liu Yun, Wang Haizhen	Comedy / Romance		
O C T O B E R	16	Promise	McFly	Liao Zhi, Miao Haizhong, Chen Haoran, Zhou Haodong, Sun Guitian, Han Sanming, Zhang Guorong, Liu Tingzuo, Li Mingjing	Drama		
O C T O B E R	17	Blue Sky Bones	Cui Jian	Ni Hongjie, Zhao Youliang, Yin Fang, Lei Han, Tao Ye, Huang Xuan, Huang Huan, Guo Jinglin, Mao Amin	Drama / Music	Entered into the 2013 Rome Film Festival	
O C T O B E R	17	The Break-up Season	Yao Yu	Gu Liya, Angel Wei, Rick Xu, Zhang Xiaojun, Ji Feilong, Zheng Yuzhi, Ma Junqin, Wang Jieshi, Wu Haiyan	Drama / Comedy / Romance		
O C T O B E R	17	Double Exposure	Li Jinhang	Qin Wenjing, Ma Wenlong, Sabrina Qiu, Wang Wei, Wang Ziqiang, Zhou Xiang, Muhua Changlong, Yu Haorui, Li Chengfeng, Wang Ting, Bao Xianjun, Li Yuan	Thriller / Horror		
O C T O B E R	17	South of the Clouds	Guo Shuang, Feng Yuan	Aarif Rahman, Isabella Huang, Wu Xin, Rombo Shyy, Liu Zhuoting, Zhang Yilong, Cai Lu, Cui Baoyue, Liu Lei, Zhou Wei, Wang Xiaoshan	Comedy / Romance		
O C T O B E R	17	Town of the Dragon	Xue Cun	Xue Cun, Yu Qing, Ying Da, Yvonne Yung, Lam Suet, Zhu Jie, Qin Xueshi, Li Bin, Miao Haizhong, Niu Mengmeng	Comedy / Mystery		
O C T O B E R	21	Factory Boss	Zhang Wei	Yao Anlian, Tang Yan, Zhao Ju, Huang Jingyi	Drama		
O C T O B E R	23	Feiyu Show	Sun Hong	Xiaofei, Yu Zhou	Documentary		
O C T O B E R	23	Five Minutes to Tomorrow	Isao Yukisada	Liu Shishi, Haruma Miura, Joseph Chang, Niu Ben, Yu Ya, Wang Zhihua, Sheng Kexin, Sheng Keyi, Zhang Yibai	Romance / Suspense		
O C T O B E R	24	Hero of the River	Tao Mingxi	Li Bingyuan, Leung Siu-lung, Chen Zhihui, Gao Lihong, Cao Shuai, Chen Chao, Cui Yulin, Wang Qianyou, Chen Shi, Guo Wenxue, Wang Feihong, Yao Dongfang, Chen Zhuzhu, Wang Jingqi, Feng Tinghua, Ma Honghu, Wu Yaqiong, Zhou Guangju, Huang Mingying, Zheng Ruilin	Drama / Action / Romance		
O C T O B E R	24	(Sex) Appeal	Wang Weiming	Vivian Hsu, Amber Kuo, Alyssa Chia, Leon Dai, Jade Chou, Huang Yuan, Ke Suyun, Xia Yu-tong, Lene Lai	Drama / Romance	Mainland-Taiwan co-production	
O C T O B E R	24	Target	Yang Jiang	Song Yang, Yang Chengjun, Kara Wong, Maria Makarenko, Ma Qiang, Ran Tian	Action / Suspense / Crime		
O C T O B E R	30	The Haunted Cinema	Yuan Jie	Liu Yanxi, Luo Xiang, Wei Xingyu, Yu Miao, Tang Chengjing, Zhang Qiyan, Ren Peng, Jiang Yuxi, Dai Chao	Suspense / Thriller		
O C T O B E R	31	Kung Fu Jungle	Teddy Chan	Donnie Yen, Wang Baoqiang, Charlie Young, Michelle Bai, Alex Fong, Louis Fan, Xing Yu, David Chiang, Yu Kang, Christie Chen, Deep Ng, Ji Huanbo, Jessica Wong, German Cheung, Andrew Lau	Action / Thriller	Mainland-Hong Kong co-production	
O C T O B E R	31	Lonely Island	Lian Tao, Wang Kunhao	Li Yiyi, Tian Suhao, Mao Yi	Suspense / Thriller		
O C T O B E R	31	The Nightingale	Philippe Muyl	Li Baotian, Yang Xinyi, Li Xiaoran, Qin Hao	Drama / Family	Mainland-France co-production	
N O V E M B E R	4	Sweet World	Yan Ran	Zhang Yuting, Bu Xiaogui, Wang Hongbo, Li Zongyi, Li Mengming, Song Kejian, Gu Hai, Tang Tang, Zeng Yuxin	Drama		
N O V E M B E R	6	The Boundary	Wang Tao	Liu Ye, Vincent Zhao, Choo Ja-hyun, Gulnazar, Xue Haowen, Hwi Chan, Marc Ma, Wu Peirou	Drama / Mystery		
N O V E M B E R	7	Break	Li Jian, Qiu Zhongwei	Huang Shengyi, Jia Yiping, Zhang Junning, Liu Tianzuo, Lam Suet, Xiao Jian, Jiang Hongbo, Liu Huan, Yue Yueli, Li Jing	Comedy / Romance		
N O V E M B E R	7	For Love or Money	Gao Xixi	Liu Yifei, Rain, Wang Xuebing, Joan Chen, Shao Feng, Tiffany Tang, Andy On, Sun Haiying, Allen Lin, Dong Yong	Romance		
N O V E M B E R	7	She and She	Cao Ji	Wang Xi, Song Zifei, Li He, Jia Zhihai, Guo Gang	Suspense / Thriller		
N O V E M B E R	11	Don't Go Breaking My Heart 2	Johnnie To	Louis Koo, Miriam Yeung, Gao Yuanyuan, Vic Chou, Daniel Wu, Lam Suet	Drama / Comedy / Romance	Mainland-Hong Kong co-production	
N O V E M B E R	13	Haunted Road	Tong Yijian	Hong Soo-ah, Jiang Jo, Ni Musi, Peng Ling, Renata Tan, Gao Taiyu, Xu Yue	Thriller / Horror		
N O V E M B E R	14	Mystery	Wu Bing	Ady An, Jiro Wang, Guo Degang, Ning Huanyu, Chen Xinqi	Suspense / Thriller / Adventure		
N O V E M B E R	15	The Galaxy on Earth	Ning Haiqiang, Shen Dong	Li Youbin, Faye Yu, Duan Yihong, Wang Ruoxin, Gao Ming, Zhao Youliang, Song Chunli, Huang Meiying, Wu Jun, Lin Yongjian, Lin Miaoke, Pu Cunxin, Jiang Kun, Xiao Xiangyu, Chen Baoguo, Hou Shijia, Jiang Ping	Drama		
N O V E M B E R	15	We Are Young	Guo Tingbo	Guo Xin, Sun Zihao, Li Shuoran, Wang Ping, Huang Tianyun, Yao Yiqi, Wang Zhengzheng, Zhang Shaorong, Lee Kin-yan, Shui Jingxi	Drama / Dance		
N O V E M B E R	21	Waiting for Your Love	Gao Genrong, Xie Lianghong	Yan Danchen, Gu Yihao, Yang Dapeng, Shao Feng, Geng Liming, Zheng Xiaowan, Pu Zhiyuan	Comedy / Romance		
N O V E M B E R	21	Fiji Love	Tao Sheng	Jang Woo-hyuk, Yao Xingtong, Zhao Duona, Li Mao, He Zhuoyan, Jin Cao, Chen Tianwen, Liu Zihao	Comedy / Romance		
N O V E M B E R	21	Give Seven Days	Tang Xu	Yu Xintian, Xu Cenzi, Wong Kiray, Yin Zheng, Yvonne Yung, Jing Gangshan, Li Bin	Comedy / Romance		
N O V E M B E R	21	Rise of the Legend	Roy Chow	Sammo Hung, Peng Yuyan, Wang Luodan, Jing Boran, Zhang Jin, Wong Cho-lam, Qin Junjie, Feng Jiayi, Byron Mann, Gao Taiyu, Tony Leung Ka-fai, Angelababy	Drama / Action / Romance / Martial-arts	Mainland-Hong Kong co-production	
N O V E M B E R	28	Bad Sister	Kim Tae-kyun	Ivy Chen, Ji Jin-hee, Cheney Chen, Christy Chung, Qi Xi, Li Xinyun, Hyelim, Liu Yiwei, Xie Dongshen, Liu Xunzimo	Comedy / Romance	Mainland-South Korea co-production	
N O V E M B E R	28	Blind Massage	Lou Ye	Guo Xiaodong, Qin Hao, Zhang Lei, Mei Ting, Huang Xuan, Huang Lu, Wang Zhihua, Huang Junjun, Jiang Dan, Mu Huaipeng	Drama	Entered into the 64th Berlin International Film Festival	
N O V E M B E R	28	Crazy Love	Cong Yi	Lee Wei, Su Xiaomei, Tong Yixuan, Fu Man, Qin Hanlei, Cui Wenlu, Yu Jinlong	Comedy / Romance		
N O V E M B E R	28	Women Who Flirt	Pang Ho-cheung	Zhou Xun, Huang Xiaoming, Xie Yilin, Sonia Sui	Comedy / Romance	Mainland-Hong Kong co-production	
N O V E M B E R	28	Youth Time	Wang Jinger	Zheng Zhongyu, Tong Yang, Zhang Leiyu, Li Xinman, Xing Cheng, Xu Jiawei, Sun Qiheng, Fang Chengcheng, Bei Lele, Zhou Tiantian, Guan Yu, Zhang Yunhai	Drama / Romance		
D E C E M B E R	2	The Crossing	John Woo	Zhang Ziyi, Takeshi Kaneshiro, Song Hye-kyo, Huang Xiaoming, Tong Dawei, Masami Nagasawa, Qin Hailu, Faye Yu, Tony Yang, Yang Kuei-mei, Cong Shan, Angeles Woo, Yu Zhen, Wang Qianyuan, Bowie Lam, Lin Mei-hsiu, Jack Kao, Denny Huang, Kou Chia-jui, Xu Huanhuan, You Yong, Liu Yiwei, Hitomi Kuroki, Johnny Kou, Fang Qingzhuo	Drama / Romance		
D E C E M B E R	4	A Murder Beside Yanhe River	Wang Fangfang	Chen Taishen, Wang Kai, Mao Hai, Huang Haibing, Yang Jiayin, Ma Weiwei, Dai Jiang, Zhang Jie, Cai Yida	Drama / Mystery / History		
D E C E M B E R	5	Fleet of Time	Zhang Yibai	Peng Yuyan, Ni Ni, Zheng Kai, Vision Wei, Zhang Zixuan, Chen He, Cya Liu, Bi Xia	Romance		
D E C E M B E R	5	Tomb Robber	Yu Dao	Michael Tong, Muqi Miya, Li Bingyuan, Li Tao, Guo Da, Zhang Shan	Action / Suspense / Thriller / Adventure		
D E C E M B E R	11	Kung Fu Angels	Herman Yau	Karena Ng, Jones Xu, Alex Lam, Janelle Sing, Zhang Chuchu, Tats Lau, Johnson Yuen, Song Jia, Raymond Wong	Comedy / Romance	Mainland-Hong Kong co-production	
D E C E M B E R	11	Who Moved My Dream	Wang Wei, Jackson Pat	Zhang Lanxin, Leon Jay Williams, Hu Bing, He Bin, Kingdom Yuen, Law Kar-ying, Mark Cheng, Viona Wang, Sabrina Qiu, Zhang Yujie, Cai Heng	Drama / Comedy / Romance		
D E C E M B E R	12	Flower's Curse	Li Kelong	Liao Weiwei, Qi Zhi, Luo Bin, Tian Yuqing, Zhang Xinyan, Yang Zitong, Wang Qi, Zhang Mengtian	Romance / Thriller / Horror		
D E C E M B E R	12	Meet Miss Anxiety	Kwak Jae-yong	Zhou Xun, Tong Dawei, Wallace Chung, Zhang Zilin, Yao Yao, Chan Fai-hung, Li Jing, White. K, Wu Bi, Mo Xier	Comedy / Romance		
D E C E M B E R	16	Coincidence	Lei Jinke	Peng Bo, Wang Shuangbao, Wang Yinqi, Li Tiannuo, Wong Yat-fei, Dong Lifan	Comedy / Mystery		
D E C E M B E R	18	Gone with the Bullets	Jiang Wen	Jiang Wen, Ge You, Zhou Yun, Shu Qi, Wen Zhang, Wang Zhiwen, Hung Huang, Harrison Liu, Na Ying, Liu Sola, Niu Ben, Jiang Hongqi	Comedy / Romance / Suspense / Adventure		
D E C E M B E R	23	The Taking of Tiger Mountain	Tsui Hark	Zhang Hanyu, Tony Leung Ka-fai, Lin Gengxin, Yu Nan, Tong Liya, Han Geng, Chen Xiao, Tse Miu, Wu Xudong, John Do, Hai Yitian, Zhang Li, Xing Yu, Sun Jiaolong, Cheng Sihan, Yuan Wu, Xiao Yi, Wang Yao, Yang Yiwei	Action / War / Adventure	Mainland-Hong Kong co-production	
D E C E M B E R	24	Cherish in Love	Wang Anqing	Xiang Tian, Liu Changchun, Wang Yufei, Wang Xiaoxi, Su Danping, Liu Yu, Zhu Yingying, Chen Yanwen	Romance		
D E C E M B E R	24	Love on the Cloud	Gu Changwei	Angelababy, Michael Chen, Zhang Luyi, Cao Lu, Wang Ji, Jiang Ruijia, Ju Hao, Tu Yanni, Jiang Wu, Mao Amin, Song Dongye, Wang Baoqiang, Jiang Wenli, Wang Jiajia, Tong Dawei, Wen Zhang	Comedy / Romance		
D E C E M B E R	24	Forget All Remember	Guo Tingbo	Fu Xinbo, Michelle Bai, Tan Weiwei, Theresa Fu, Ji Jie, Simon Chung, Li Yu	Romance		
D E C E M B E R	26	Death Trip	Liu Chen, Tian Li	Van Fan, Li Xinyun, Li Yuan, Xue Cun	Mystery / Thriller	Mainland-Thailand co-production	
D E C E M B E R	31	Bloody Doll	Teruyoshi Ishii	Jiro Wang, Zhou Qiqi, Don Li, Jiang Jing, Shen Xinong	Thriller / Horror		
D E C E M B E R	31	One Hundred Thousand Bad Jokes	Lu Hengyu, Li Shujie	Ketsu, Huang Zhenji, Baomu Zhongyang, Shan Xin, Zhu Quecheng, Tute Hameng, Lu Hengyu, Sidao Huizhang	Comedy / Animation / Fantasy		
D E C E M B E R	31	Sunflowers in Full Bloom	Liu Ning	An Chun-tsan, Chen Qiaoxi, Yao Zheng, Lin Yichen, Lan Jing, Wei Ziyin	Comedy / Romance / Music		
D E C E M B E R	31	Who Is Undercover	Fan Jianhui	Lin Chi-ling, Tony Leung Ka-fai, Gillian Chung, Meng Tingyi, Vivian Wu, Christopher Lee, Kent Cheng, Su Jin, Liu Lujia, Lu Yulai	Drama / Mystery		

== See also ==
- List of Chinese films of 2013
- List of Chinese films of 2015
