= List of romance films =

This is a list of romance films.

- 1 Last Chance at Paradise (2013)
- 10 Things I Hate About You (1999)
- After (2019)
- 500 Days of Summer (2009)
- Aashiqui (1990)
- Aashiqui 2 (2013)
- About Time (2013)
- Across the Universe (2007)
- Against the Grain (2012)
- An Affair to Remember (1957)
- The Age of Adaline (2015)
- The Age of Innocence (1993)
- All That Heaven Allows (1955)
- Amelie (2001)
- Ananta Bhalobasha (1999)
- Angel Eyes (2001)
- Annie Hall (1977)
- An Officer and a Gentleman (1982)
- The Anonymous Venetian (1970)
- The Artist (2011)
- At Cafe 6 (2016)
- Autumn in New York (2000)
- Band Baaja Baaraat (2010)
- Be Together (2015)
- Beautiful Thing (1996)
- Beauty and the Beast (2005)
- Before Midnight (2013)
- Before Sunrise (1995)
- Before Sunset (2004)
- The Beloved (2015)
- Ben & Lacy (2023)
- The Best of Me (2014)
- Beyond Borders (2003)
- Beyond the Lights (2014)
- Big Red Envelope (2021)
- Bitter Love (2014)
- Blue is the Warmest Colour (2013)
- Blue Valentine (2010)
- Blood Ransom (2014)
- Bobby (1973)
- Bonnie and Clyde (1967)
- Bounce (2000)
- The Break-up Season (2014)
- Breakfast at Tiffany's (1961)
- The Bridges of Madison County (1995)
- Brief Encounter (1945)
- Brokeback Mountain (2005)
- But I'm a Cheerleader (1999)
- Call Me by Your Name (2017)
- Camille (1936)
- Casablanca (1942)
- Charlie St. Cloud (2010)
- Chandani (1989)
- Charlotte (2017)
- Cherish in Love (2014)
- The Choice (2016)
- City Lights (1931)
- City of Angels (1998)
- Close Range Love (2014)
- Closer (2004)
- Crazy Rich Asians (2018)
- Dawn Break Up (2015)
- Dear John (2010)
- Devdas (2002)
- Devdas (2013)
- Different from the Others (1919)
- Dil Se.. (1998)
- Dil To Pagal Hai (1997)
- Dilwale Dulhania Le Jayenge (1995)
- Dirty Dancing (1987)
- Dirty Dancing: Havana Nights (2004)
- Doctor Zhivago (1965)
- Dying Young (1991)
- The Earrings of Madame de... (1953)
- Edward Scissorhands (1990)
- Elemental (2023)
- Endless Love (1981)
- Endless Love (2014)
- The Eighth House (2014)
- Embrace Again (2021)
- The English Patient (1996)
- Eternal Sunshine of the Spotless Mind (2004)
- Ex Fighting (2014)
- Fall in Love Like a Star (2015)
- Falling In Love (1984)
- Falling Into Place (2023)
- Fanaa (2006)
- The Fault in Our Stars (2014)
- Fifty Shades of Grey (2015)
- Five Minutes to Tomorrow (2014)
- Fleet of Time (2014)
- Flower's Curse (2014)
- Forever Love (2014)
- Forever Young (2014)
- Forget All Remember (2014)
- Friends with Benefits (2011)
- From Prada to Nada (2011)
- Fitoor (2016)
- Five Feet Apart (2019)
- The Glass Mountain (1949)
- Gone with the Wind (1939)
- The Goodbye Girl (1977)
- Griffin and Phoenix (1976)
- Griffin & Phoenix (2006)
- Hanamizuki (2010)
- Happy Birthday, Toby Simpson (2017)
- Hello, My Dolly Girlfriend (2013)
- Here on Earth (2000)
- Holiday (1938)
- House of Flying Daggers (2004)
- Hum Dil De Chuke Sanam (1999)
- I Just Wanna Hug You (2014)
- If I Stay (2014)
- If Only (2004)
- The Illusionist (2006)
- In the Mood for Love (2000)
- In Your Eyes (2014)
- Initiation Love (2015)
- Interlude (1968)
- The Jane Austen Book Club (2007)
- Jab We Met (2007)
- Kate & Leopold (2001)
- The King of San Gregorio (2005)
- Kites (2010)
- The Lake House (2006)
- La La Land (2016)
- Last Chance Harvey (2008)
- The Last Song (2010)
- Last Tango in Paris (1972)
- The Lead Singer and Dancer and His Woman (2015)
- L'Eclisse (1962)
- Let's Get Married (2015)
- Letter from an Unknown Woman (1948)
- Letters to Juliet (2010)
- The Longest Ride (2015)
- Love, Simon (2018)
- Love & Basketball (2000)
- Love & Other Drugs (2010)
- Love Exposure (2008)
- Love Happens (2009)
- Love O2O (2016)
- Love on the Cloud (2014)
- Love Actually (2003)
- Love Story (1970)
- Love's Whirlpool (2014)
- Lovestruck: The Musical (2013)
- The Lucky One (2012)
- Mad Love (1995)
- Man's Way with Women (1934)
- Manhattan (1979)
- Me Before You (2016)
- Meet Joe Black (1998)
- Message in a Bottle (1999)
- Midnight in Paris (2011)
- Moh (2022)
- Mr. & Mrs. Smith (2005)
- Mughal-e-Azam (1960)
- Murmur of the Hearts (2015)
- My Hawaiian Discovery (2014)
- My Man (2014)
- My Sassy Girl (2008)
- Mungaru Male (2006)
- Nana to Kaoru (2011)
- Nana to Kaoru: Chapter 2 (2012)
- Nanito (2025)
- Never Gone (2016)
- Never Said Goodbye (2016)
- Nights in Rodanthe (2008)
- No Strings Attached (2011)
- The Notebook (2004)
- Notting Hill (1999)
- One Day (2011)
- One Step Away (2014)
- O Kadhal Kanmani (2015)
- Her Granddaughter (2015)
- The Palm Beach Story (1942)
- Paper Towns (2015)
- Parineeta (2005)
- Past Lives (2023)
- Pearl Harbor (2001)
- The Phantom of the Opera (2004)
- Pompeii (2014)
- Pride & Prejudice (2005)
- The Princess Bride (1987)
- The Princess Diaries (2001)
- Priyotoma (2023)
- The Proposal (2009)
- P.S. I Love You (2007)
- Punch-Drunk Love (2002)
- The Queens (2015)
- Ramani Kalyanam (2026)
- The Reader (2008)
- Relationship Dilemma (2015)
- Reds (1981)
- Remember Me (2010)
- Roja (1992)
- Romeo + Juliet (1996)
- Romeo and Juliet (1968)
- The Room (2003)
- Safe Haven (2013)
- Say Anything... (1989)
- (Sex) Appeal (2014)
- Scott Pilgrim vs. the World (2010)
- Sex Life of Plants (2015)
- Shakespeare in Love (1998)
- Singin' in the Rain (1952)
- Sleepless in Seattle (1993)
- Shelter (2007)
- Slumdog Millionaire (2009)
- Something Borrowed (2011)
- Something's Gotta Give (2003)
- Somewhere in Time (1980)
- The Song of the Blood-Red Flower (1971)
- Sophie's Choice (1982)
- Sorry, I Love You (2014)
- South of the Clouds (2014)
- Spicy Hot in Love (2016)
- Splash (1984)
- Spring (2014)
- A Star Is Born (2018)
- Sublime (2022)
- Sundays at Tiffany's (2010)
- Sunrise: A Song of Two Humans (1927)
- Swiss Army Man (2016)
- The Shape of Water (2017)
- The Twilight Saga (2008-2012)
- Titanic (1997)
- Tristan & Isolde (2006)
- The Vow (2012)
- Twister (1996)
- A Walk to Remember (2002)
- Warm Bodies (2013)
- Water for Elephants (2011)
- When Harry Met Sally... (1989)
- Where the Heart Is (2000)
- Who Moved My Dream (2014)
- Wimbledon (2004)
- Working Girl (1988)
- World of Delight (2015)
- While You Were Sleeping (1995)
- Written on the Wind (1956)
- You Are My Sunshine (2015)
- You've Got Mail (1998)
- Zama Arman (2013)

== See also ==
- List of romantic comedy films
- List of interracial romance films
- List of romance anime
- Chick flick
