= List of thriller films of the 2010s =

Following is a list of thriller films released in the 2010s.

== 2010 ==
Title	Director	Cast	Country	Subgenre/notes
22 Bullets	Richard Berry	Jean Reno, Kad Merad, Richard Berry	France	Action thriller
The A-Team	Joe Carnahan	Liam Neeson, Bradley Cooper, Quinton Jackson	United States	Action thriller
Abandoned	Michael Feifer	Brittany Murphy, Dean Cain, Mimi Rogers	United States	
The American	Anton Corbijn	George Clooney, Paolo Bonacelli, Thekla Reuten	United States	
Black Swan	Darren Aronofsky	Natalie Portman, Mila Kunis, Vincent Cassel	United States	
Buried	Rodrigo Cortés	Ryan Reynolds, Ivana Miño, Anne Lockhart	Spain	
Cold Fish	Sion Sono	Denden, Megumi Kagurazaka, Tetsu Watanabe	Japan	
Confessions	Tetsuya Nakashima	Takako Matsu	Japan	
The Crazies	Breck Eisner	Timothy Olyphant, Radha Mitchell, Danielle Panabaker	United States	Action thriller
Devil	John Erick Dowdle	Chris Messina, Logan Marshall-Green, Jenny O'Hara	United States	
Edge of Darkness	Martin Campbell	Mel Gibson, Danny Huston, Ray Winstone	United Kingdom; United States	
The Experiment	Paul Scheuring	Adrien Brody, Forest Whitaker, Cam Gigandet	United States	
Fair Game	Doug Liman	Naomi Watts, Sean Penn, Bruce McGill	United States	
From Paris with Love	Pierre Morel	John Travolta, Jonathan Rhys Meyers, Kasia Smutniak	France; United States	Action thriller
Frozen	Adam Green	Emma Bell, Shawn Ashmore, Kevin Zegers	United States	Psychological thriller
The Ghost Writer	Roman Polanski	Ewan McGregor, Pierce Brosnan, Kim Cattrall	Germany; United Kingdom; France	
Golden Slumber	Yoshihiro Nakamura	Masato Sakai, Yuko Takeuchi, Hidetaka Yoshioka	Japan	
Green Zone	Paul Greengrass	Matt Damon, Greg Kinnear, Brendan Gleeson	France; United Kingdom; United States	
I Saw the Devil	Kim Jee-woon	Lee Byung-hun, Choi Min-sik	South Korea	
Killers	Robert Luketic	Ashton Kutcher, Katherine Heigl, Tom Selleck	United States	Action thriller
Legion	Scott Stewart	Paul Bettany, Lucas Black, Tyrese Gibson	United States	
Life Is an Art	Jayant R. Harnam	Alison Carroll, Martin Swabey	Netherlands	Psychological thriller
The Losers	Sylvain White	Jeffrey Dean Morgan, Chris Evans, Jason Patric	United States	Action thriller
Love Crime	Alain Corneau	Ludivine Sagnier, Kristin Scott Thomas, Gérald Laroche	France	Psychological thriller
The Man from Nowhere	Lee Jeong-beom	Won Bin, Kim Sae-ron, Kim Hee-won	South Korea	Action thriller
The Next Three Days	Paul Haggis	Russell Crowe, Elizabeth Banks, Liam Neeson	United States	
Salt	Phillip Noyce	Angelina Jolie, Liev Schreiber, Chiwetel Ejiofor	United States	
Secret Reunion	Jang Hoon	Song Kang-ho, Kang Dong-won, Jeon Guk-hwan	South Korea	
The Hunter	Rafi Pitts	Rafi Pitts, Mitra Hajjar	Germany; Iran	Crime thriller
Shutter Island	Martin Scorsese	Leonardo DiCaprio, Mark Ruffalo, Ben Kingsley	United States	
Smokin' Aces 2: Assassins' Ball	P. J. Pesce	Tom Berenger, Clayne Crawford, Tommy Flanagan	United States	Action thriller
The Tourist	Florian Henckel von Donnersmarck	Angelina Jolie, Johnny Depp, Timothy Dalton	United States	
The Town	Ben Affleck	Ben Affleck, Rebecca Hall, Jon Hamm	United States	Crime thriller
Unstoppable	Tony Scott	Denzel Washington, Chris Pine, Rosario Dawson	United States	Action thriller
Unthinkable	Gregor Jordan	Samuel L. Jackson, Carrie-Anne Moss, Michael Sheen	United States	

== 2011 ==
Title	Director	Cast	Country	Subgenre/Notes
Abduction	John Singleton	Taylor Lautner, Frank Molina, Lily Collins	United States	
A Morass	Shane James Bordas	Nina Hatchwell, Alessandro Giuggioli	United Kingdom	Noir thriller
Blind Turn	Robert Orr	Rachel Boston, Jay Dee Walters, John Gabriel Rodriquez	United States	
The Devil's Double	Lee Tamahori	Dominic Cooper, Ludivine Sagnier, Raad Rawi	Belgium	
Drive	Nicolas Winding Refn	Ryan Gosling, Carey Mulligan, Bryan Cranston	United States	
Drive Angry	Patrick Lussier	Nicolas Cage, Amber Heard, William Fichtner	United States	Action thriller
Elephant White	Prachya Pinkaew	Kevin Bacon, Djimon Hounsou, Jirantanin Pitakorntrakul	United States	Action thriller
The Girl with the Dragon Tattoo	David Fincher	Daniel Craig, Rooney Mara, Christopher Plummer	United States	
Hanna	Joe Wright	Saoirse Ronan, Eric Bana, Tom Hollander	United States	
I Am Number Four	D. J. Caruso	Alex Pettyfer, Timothy Olyphant, Teresa Palmer	United States	Action thriller
The Ides of March	George Clooney	Ryan Gosling, George Clooney, Philip Seymour Hoffman	United States	Political thriller
The Ledge	Matthew Chapman	Charlie Hunnam, Terrence Howard, Liv Tyler	United States	
Limitless	Neil Burger	Bradley Cooper, Robert De Niro, Abbie Cornish	United States	
The Lincoln Lawyer	Brad Furman	Matthew McConaughey, Marisa Tomei, Ryan Phillippe	United States	
Martha Marcy May Marlene	T. Sean Durkin	Elizabeth Olsen, Sarah Paulson, John Hawkes	United States	
Requiem pour une tueuse	Jérôme Le Gris	Mélanie Laurent	France	
The Resident	Antti Jokinen	Hilary Swank, Jeffrey Dean Morgan, Christopher Lee	United States	
The Roommate	Christian E. Christiansen	Leighton Meester, Minka Kelly, Cam Gigandet	United States	
Season of the Witch	Dominic Sena	Nicolas Cage, Ron Perlman, Stephen Campbell Moore	United States	
The Skin I Live In	Pedro Almodóvar	Antonio Banderas, Elena Anaya, Marisa Paredes	Spain	
Sleepless Night	Frédéric Jardin	Tomer Sisley, Serge Riaboukine, Julien Boisselier	France; Belgium; Luxembourg	
Source Code	Duncan Jones	Jake Gyllenhaal, Michelle Monaghan, Vera Farmiga	Canada; United States	
Trespass	Joel Schumacher	Nicolas Cage, Nicole Kidman, Ben Mendelsohn	United States	
Unknown	Jaume Collet-Serra	Liam Neeson, Diane Kruger, January Jones	Germany; United States	
Wrecked	Michael Greenspan	Adrien Brody, Caroline Dhavernas, Ryan Robbins	Canada	
X	Jon Hewitt	Viva Bianca, Hanna Mangan-Lawrence, Peter Docker	United States	

== 2012 ==
Title	Director	Cast	Country	Subgenre/Notes
Act of Valor	Scott Waugh, Mike "Mouse" McCoy	Emilio Rivera, Roselyn Sánchez, Alex Veadov	United States	Action thriller
The Apparition	Todd Lincoln	Ashley Greene, Sebastian Stan, Tom Felton	United States	
Bending the Rules	Artie Mandelburg	Jamie Kennedy, Edge	United States	Comedy, crime thriller
The Body	Oriol Paulo	José Coronado, Belén Rueda	Spain	Psychological thriller
Black & White Episode I: The Dawn of Assault	Tsai Yueh-hsun	Mark Chao, Huang Bo, Angelababy	Taiwan	Action thriller
Chronicle	Josh Trank	Dane DeHaan, Alex Russell, Michael B. Jordan	United States	
Compliance	Craig Zobel	Ann Dowd, Dreama Walker, Pat Healy	United States	
Contraband	Baltasar Kormákur	Mark Wahlberg, Kate Beckinsale, Ben Foster	United States	Action thriller, crime thriller
Elfie Hopkins	Ryan Andrews	Jaime Winstone, Ray Winstone, Steven Mackintosh	United Kingdom	Horror thriller
Fire with Fire	David Barrett	Josh Duhamel, Bruce Willis, Vincent D'Onofrio	United States	Action thriller
Ghost Rider: Spirit of Vengeance	Mark Neveldine, Brian Taylor	Nicolas Cage, Ciarán Hinds, Violante Placido	United States	Action thriller
Gone	Heitor Dhalia	Amanda Seyfried, Daniel Sunjata, Jennifer Carpenter	United States	
Jack Reacher	Christopher McQuarrie	Tom Cruise, Rosamund Pike, Robert Duvall	United States	
Kahaani	Sujoy Ghosh	Vidya Balan, Parambrata Chattopadhyay, Nawazuddin Siddiqui	India	
Looper	Rian Johnson	Bruce Willis, Joseph Gordon-Levitt, Emily Blunt	United States	
Man on a Ledge	Asger Leth	Sam Worthington, Elizabeth Banks, Anthony Mackie	United States	
Premium Rush	David Koepp	Joseph Gordon-Levitt, Michael Shannon, Dania Ramirez	United States	Action thriller
Safe House	Daniel Espinosa	Denzel Washington, Ryan Reynolds, Vera Farmiga	United States	
Savages	Oliver Stone	Aaron Taylor-Johnson, Blake Lively, Benicio del Toro	United States	
Stolen	Simon West	Nicolas Cage, Malin Åkerman, Josh Lucas	United States	
Taken 2	Olivier Megaton	Liam Neeson, Maggie Grace, Famke Janssen	France; United States	
The Tall Man	Pascal Laugier	Jessica Biel, Jodelle Ferland, Stephen McHattie	France; Canada	
Underworld: Awakening	Måns Mårlind, Bjorn Stein	Kate Beckinsale, Stephen Rea, Michael Ealy	United States	Action thriller
The Viral Factor	Dante Lam	Jay Chou, Lin Peng, Nicholas Tse	Hong Kong	Action thriller

== 2013 ==
Title	Director	Cast	Country	Subgenre/Notes
Avenged	Michael S. Ojeda	Amanda Adrienne, Tom Ardavanay, Rodney Rowland	United States	Action horror thriller
The Call	Brad Anderson	Halle Berry, Abigail Breslin, Morris Chesnut, Michael Eklund, Michael Imperioli, David Otunga	United States	Psychological thriller, paranoid thriller
The Counselor	Ridley Scott	Michael Fassbender, Penélope Cruz, Cameron Diaz	United Kingdom; United States	Crime thriller
Drishyam	Jeethu Joseph	Mohanlal, Meena	India	
Lucia	Pawan Kumar	Ninasam Satish, Sruthi Hariharan	India	
Montage	Jeong Keun-seob	Uhm Jung-hwa, Kim Sang-kyung	South Korea	
Prisoners	Denis Villeneuve	Hugh Jackman, Jake Gyllenhaal, Viola Davis, Maria Bello	United States	
The Purge	James DeMonaco	Ethan Hawke, Lena Headey, Max Burkholder	United States	
Side Effects	Steven Soderbergh	Rooney Mara, Channing Tatum, Jude Law	United States	
Stoker	Park Chan-wook	Mia Wasikowska, Matthew Goode, Nicole Kidman	United States	
The Supernatural Events on Campus	Guan Er	Zhao Yihuan, Wang Yi, Li Manyi	China	Horror
Trance	Danny Boyle	James McAvoy, Vincent Cassel, Rosario Dawson	United Kingdom	
Ugly	Anurag Kashyap	Ronit Roy, Rahul Bhat, Vineet Kumar Singh, Girish Kulkarni	India	Psychological thriller
Upstream Color	Shane Carruth	Amy Seimetz, Shane Carruth, Andrew Sensenig	United States	

== 2014 ==
Title	Director	Cast	Country	Subgenre/Notes
Bloody Doll	Teruyoshi Ishii	Jiro Wang, Zhou Qiqi, Don Li	China	Horror
Bugs	Yan Jia	Xia Zitong, Zhang Zilin, Eric Wang	China	Science fiction disaster
Christmas Icetastrophe	Jonathan Winfrey	Victor Webster, Jennifer Spence, Richard Harmon	United States	Television film
Cold in July	Jim Mickle	Michael C. Hall, Sam Shepard, Vinessa Shaw	United States	
The Deathday Party	Xie Hang	Anita Yuen, Xiong Naijin, Archie Kao	China	Suspense
Double Exposure	Li Jinhang	Qin Wenjing, Ma Wenlong, Sabrina Qiu	China	Horror
The Eighth House	Zhang Li	Bao Tino, Ni Jingyang, Chang Le	China	Romance
Flower's Curse	Li Kelong	Qi Zhi, Liao Weiwei, Luo Bin	China	Romance horror
Gone Girl	David Fincher	Rosamund Pike, Ben Affleck, Tyler Perry	United States	Psychological thriller
Haunted Road	Yijian Tong	Su-a Hong, Jo Jiang, Musi Ni	China	Horror
Honeymoon	Leigh Janiak	Harry Treadaway, Rose Leslie	United States	Psychological thriller
The Imitation Game	Morten Tyldum	Benedict Cumberbatch, Keira Knightley, Matthew Goode	United States	Historical thriller
Inside the Girls	Liang Ting	Wen Xin, Cheng Yi, Yin Zheng	China	Suspense
John Wick	Chad Stahelski	Keanu Reeves, Michael Nyqvist, Alfie Allen	United States	Action thriller
Kingsman: The Secret Service	Matthew Vaughn	Colin Firth, Taron Egerton, Samuel L. Jackson	United Kingdom, United States	Action comedy
Lonely Island	Lian Tao, Wang Kunhao	Li Yiyi, Tian Suhao, Mao Yi	China	Suspense horror
Midnight Hair	Liu Ning	Daniella Wang, Lee Wei, Xuan Lu	China	Horror
Monsterz	Hideo Nakata	Tatsuya Fujiwara, Takayuki Yamada	Japan	Fantasy horror
Mystery	Wu Bing	Ady An, Jiro Wang, Guo Degang	China	Suspense adventure
Nightcrawler	Dan Gilroy	Jake Gyllenhaal, Rene Russo, Bill Paxton	United States	
Non-Stop	Jaume Collet-Serra	Liam Neeson, Julianne Moore, Scoot McNairy	France; Canada; United Kingdom; United States	
She and She	Cao Ji	Wang Xi, Song Zifei, Li He	China	Suspense
Skin Trade	Ekachai Uekrongtham	Dolph Lundgren, Tony Jaa, Michael Jai White, Ron Perlman, Peter Weller	United States	Action thriller
The Snow White Murder Case	Yoshihiro Nakamura	Mao Inoue, Gō Ayano, Nanao	Japan	Mystery thriller
The Guest	Adam Wingard	Dan Stevens, Leland Orser, Lance Reddick	United States	
The Haunted Cinema	Yuan Jie	Liu Yanxi, Luo Xiang, Wei Xingyu	China	Suspense horror
Tomb Robber	Yu Dao	Michael Tong, Muqi Miya, Li Bingyuan	China	Action adventure suspense
Under the Bed 2	Yuan Jie	Abby, Li Henan, Chen Yuan	China	Suspense

== 2015 ==
Title	Director	Cast	Country	Subgenre/Notes
The Boy Next Door	Rob Cohen	Jennifer Lopez, Ryan Guzman	United States<	Psychological thriller
Colonia	Florian Gallenberger	Emma Watson, Daniel Brühl, Michael Nyqvist	Germany	
Dark Places	Gilles Paquet-Brenner	Charlize Theron, Christina Hendricks, Nicholas Hoult	United States; United Kingdom; France	Psychological thriller
Death Trip	Billy Tang	Victor Wong, Zeng Yongti, Han Bo-reum	China	
Drishyam	Nishikant Kamat	Ajay Devgn, Tabu, Shriya Saran	India	
Eye in the Sky	Gavin Hood	Helen Mirren, Aaron Paul, Alan Rickman	United Kingdom	
The Gift	Joel Edgerton	Jason Bateman, Rebecca Hall, Joel Edgerton	United States; Australia	Psychological thriller
Grasshopper	Tomoyuki Takimoto	Toma Ikuta, Tadanobu Asano, Ryosuke Yamada	Japan	
Insanity	David Lee	Sean Lau, Huang Xiaoming, Alex Fong	China; Hong Kong	
The Invitation	Karyn Kusama	Logan Marshall-Green, Tammy Blanchard, Michiel Huisman	United States	Horror thriller
The Mystery of Death	Ben Wong	Deric Wan, Huang Zheng, Josephine Yu	China	
Nowhere to Run	Wang Mengyuan	Zhang Duo, Liu Ying, Ge Tian	China	
Prophecy	Yoshihiro Nakamura	Toma Ikuta, Yoshiyoshi Arakawa, Erika Toda	Japan	Psychological thriller
Scary Road Is Fun	Samm Chan	Zhang Junning, Michael Tong, He Haoyang	China	Comedy thriller
Tōkyō Mukokuseki Shōjo	Mamoru Oshii	Nana Seino, Nobuaki Kaneko, Lily	Japan	Suspense

== 2016 ==
Title	Director	Cast	Country	Subgenre/Notes
The Accountant	Gavin O'Connor	Ben Affleck, Anna Kendrick, J. K. Simmons	United States	
The Girl on the Train	Tate Taylor	Emily Blunt, Justin Theroux, Rebecca Ferguson, Luke Evans	United States	
Hush	Mike Flanagan	Kate Siegel, John Gallagher Jr., Michael Trucco	United States	Horror thriller
Jack Reacher: Never Go Back	Edward Zwick	Tom Cruise, Cobie Smulders	United States	
Mine	Fabio Guaglione, Fabio Resinaro	Armie Hammer, Annabelle Wallis, Tom Cullen, Juliet Aubrey	Italy; United States; Spain	Psychological thriller
Money Monster	Jodie Foster	George Clooney, Julia Roberts, Jack O'Connell	United States	Paranoid thriller
Nocturnal Animals	Tom Ford	Amy Adams, Jake Gyllenhaal, Michael Shannon, Aaron Taylor-Johnson	United States	Psychological thriller
South of 8	Tony Olmos	Brian Patrick Butler, George Jac, Jennifer Paredes, Kathryn Schott, Raye Richards	United States	Crime thriller
Uriyadi	Vijay Kumar	Vijay Kumar, Mime Gopi	India	Political thriller

== 2017 ==
Title	Director	Cast	Country	Subgenre/Notes
Based on a True Story	Roman Polanski	Emmanuelle Seigner, Eva Green, Vincent Perez	France; Italy; Poland	Psychological thriller
Berlin Syndrome	Cate Shortland	Teresa Palmer, Max Riemelt	Australia; France	Psychological thriller
The Covenant	Robert Conway	Monica Engesser, Owen Conway, Clint James, Sanford Gibbons, Maria Olsen, Shawn Saavedra, Richard Lippert and Amelia Haberman	United States	Mystery horror thriller drama
The Girl in the Fog	Donato Carrisi	Toni Servillo, Alessio Boni, Jean Reno	Italy	Psychological thriller
Hangman	Johnny Martin	Al Pacino, Karl Urban, Brittany Snow	United States	Crime thriller
The Hunter's Prayer	Jonathan Mostow	Sam Worthington, Odeya Rush, Allen Leech	United States; Germany; Spain	Action thriller
Immigration Game	Krystof Zlatnik	Mathis Landwehr and Denise Owono	Germany	Action thriller drama
The Invisible Guardian	Fernando González Molina	Marta Etura, Elvira Mínguez	Spain	Psychological thriller
The Invisible Guest	Oriol Paulo	Mario Casas, José Coronado, Ana Wagener, Bárbara Lennie	Spain	Psychological thriller
Kidnap	Luis Prieto	Halle Berry, Sage Correa, Chris McGinn, Lew Temple	United States	
The Man with the Iron Heart	Cédric Jimenez	Jason Clarke, Rosamund Pike, Jack O'Connell	France, Belgium	Biographical thriller
The Playground	Edreace Purmul	Myles Cranford, Merrick McCartha, Shane P. Allen, Christopher Salazar	United States	Fable
6 Days	Toa Fraser	Jamie Bell, Abbie Cornish, Mark Strong	United Kingdom; New Zealand	Political thriller
Shot Caller	Ric Roman Waugh	Nikolaj Coster-Waldau, Omari Hardwick, Lake Bell, Jon Bernthal	United States	Crime thriller
The Snowman	Tomas Alfredson	Michael Fassbender, Rebecca Ferguson, Charlotte Gainsbourg	United States; United Kingdom; Sweden	Crime thriller
Thumper	Jordan Walker Ross	Eliza Taylor, Lena Headey, Pablo Schreiber, Ben Feldman	United States	Crime thriller
You Were Never Really Here	Lynne Ramsay	Joaquin Phoenix, Ekaterina Samsonov, John Doman	United States; United Kingdom; France	Action thriller

== 2018 ==
Title	Director	Cast	Country	Subgenre/Notes
Bad Times at the El Royale	Drew Goddard	Jeff Bridges, Cynthia Erivo, Dakota Johnson	United States	
The Cabin	Johan Bodell	Christopher Lee Page, Caitlin Crommett, Erik Kammerland, Thomas Hedengran	Sweden United States	Horror
Calibre	Matt Palmer	Jack Lowden, Martin McCann, Tony Curran	United Kingdom	
The Commuter	Jaume Collet-Serra	Liam Neeson, Patrick Wilson, Vera Farmiga	United States; United Kingdom; France	Action thriller
Death Wish	Eli Roth	Bruce Willis, Vincent D'Onofrio, Elisabeth Shue	United States	Action thriller
The Girl in the Spider's Web	Fede Álvarez	Claire Foy, Sverrir Gudnason, LaKeith Stanfield	United States; Canada; Germany	Action thriller
Golden Slumber	Noh Dong-seok	Gang Dong-won, Kim Eui-sung, Kim Sung-kyun	South Korea	Action thriller
Missing	Mukul Abhyankar	Tabu, Manoj Bajpayee, and Annu Kapoor	India	Psychological thriller
The Neighbor	Aaron Harvey	William Fichtner, Jessica McNamee, Jean Louisa Kelly	United States	
The Open House	Matt Angel, Suzanne Coote	Dylan Minnette, Piercey Dalton, Sharif Atkins	United States	Horror
Ratsasan	Ram Kumar	Vishnu Vishal, Amala Paul, Saravanan	India	
The Realm	Rodrigo Sorogoyen	Antonio de la Torre, Mónica López, Josep Maria Pou	Spain	
Red Sparrow	Francis Lawrence	Jennifer Lawrence, Joel Edgerton, Matthias Schoenaerts	United States	Spy thriller
Searching	Aneesh Chaganty	John Cho, Debra Messing	United States	
A Simple Favor	Paul Feig	Anna Kendrick, Blake Lively, Henry Golding	United States	Comedy thriller
Traffik	Deon Taylor	Paula Patton and Omar Epps	United States	Action, crime thriller

== 2019 ==
Title	Director	Cast	Country	Subgenre/Notes
Cold Pursuit	Hans Petter Moland	Liam Neeson, Tom Bateman, Tom Jackson	United States; United Kingdom	Action thriller
Glass	M. Night Shyamalan	James McAvoy, Bruce Willis, Anya Taylor-Joy	United States	
I See You	Adam Randall	Helen Hunt, Jon Tenney, Judah Lewis	United States	
The Poison Rose	George Gallo	John Travolta, Morgan Freeman, Famke Janssen	United States	Neo-noir thriller
Serenity	Steven Knight	Matthew McConaughey, Anne Hathaway, Diane Lane	United States	Fantasy thriller
