= List of horror films of 2014 =

A list of horror films released in 2014.

Horror films released in 2014
Title	Director	Cast	Country	Notes
ABCs of Death 2	[various directors]		United States	
After School Massacre	Jared Masters	Nikole Howell, Lindsay Lamb, Andrew Phillips	United States	
Among the Living	Alexandre Bustillo, Julien Maury	Béatrice Dalle	France	
Annabelle	John R. Leonetti	Annabelle Wallis, Ward Horton, Alfre Woodard	United States	
Arachnicide	Paolo Bertola	Gino Barzacchi, Gabriel Cash, Riccardo Serventi Longhi	Italy	Television film
Army of Frankensteins	Ryan Bellgardt	Jordan Farris, Christian Bellgardt, Rett Terrell	United States	Science fiction horror
As Above, So Below	John Erick Dowdle	Ben Feldman, Perdita Weeks, Edwin Hodge	United States	
The Babadook	Jennifer Kent	Essie Davis, Noah Wiseman, Barbara West	Australia	
Bag Boy Lover Boy	Andres Torres	Theodore Bouloukos, Jon Wachter, Kathy Biehl	United States	
Black Butler	Kentarō Ōtani, Keiichi Satō	Hiro Mizushima, Ayame Goriki, Yūka	Japan	
Bloody Doll	Teruyoshi Ishii	Jiro Wang, Zhou Qiqi, Don Li	China	
Bunshinsaba 3	An Byung-ki	Jiang Yiyan, Jiao Junyan, Wang Longhua	China	
The Butchers	Steven Judd	Semi Anthony, Damien Puckler, Randall Bosley	United States	
Cabin Fever: Patient Zero	Kaare Andrews	Ryan Donowho, Brando Eaton, Jillian Murray	United States	
The Cabining	Steve Kopera	Mike Kopera, Bo Keister, Angela Relucio, Melissa Mars, Richard Riehle	United States	
The Canal	Ivan Kavanagh	Rupert Evans, Antonia Campbell-Hughes, Hannah Hoekstra	Ireland	
Charlie's Farm	Chris Sun	Tara Reid, Nathan Jones, Allira Jaques, Bill Moseley, Kane Hodder, Dean Kirkright, Sam Coward || Australia ||		
Closed Doors Village	Xing Bo	David Chen, Xu Dongdong, Bao Tino, Wang Liang	China	
Clown	Jon Watts	Andy Powers, Laura Allen, Peter Stormare	United States	
Creep	Patrick Brice	Patrick Brice, Mark Duplass	United States	
Dead Snow: Red vs. Dead	Tommy Wirkola	Vegar Hoel, Martin Starr, Jocelyn DeBoer	Norway; Iceland	Horror comedy
Deliver Us from Evil	Scott Derrickson	Eric Bana, Edgar Ramirez, Olivia Munn	United States	
Devil's Due	Matt Bettinelli-Olpin, Tyler Gillett	Allison Miller, Zach Gilford, Robert Belushi	United States	
Don't Blink	Travis Oates	Mena Suvari, Brian Austin Green, Joanne Kelly	United States	
Double Exposure	Li Jinhang	Qin Wenjing, Ma Wenlong, Sabrina Qiu	China	
Fatal Frame	Mari Asato	Ayami Nakajō, Aoi Morikawa	Japan	
Feng Shui 2	Chito Rono	Coco Martin, Kris Aquino, Cherry Pie Picache, Joonee Gamboa	Philippines	
Finders Keepers	Alexander Yellen	Jaime Pressly, Patrick Muldoon, Tobin Bell	United States	
Flower's Curse	Li Kelong	Qi Zhi, Liao Weiwei, Luo Bin	China	
Girl House	Trevor Matthews	Ali Cobrin, Adam DiMarco, Slaine	Canada	
A Girl Walks Home Alone at Night	Ana Lily Amirpour	Sheila Vand, Arash Marandi, Mozhan Marnò	Iran	
Gore, Quebec	Jean Benoit Lauzon	Kate Elyse Forrest, Blake Mawson	Canada	
The Haunted Cinema	Yuan Jie	Liu Yanxi, Luo Xiang, Wei Xingyu	China	
Haunted Road	Yijian Tong	Su-a Hong, Jo Jiang, Musi Ni	China	
Hollow	Trần Hàm	Nguyễn Ngọc Hiệp, Trần Bảo Sơn, Nguyễn Hồng Ân	Vietnam	
Housebound	Gerard Johnstone	Morgana O'Reilly, Rima Te Wiata, Glen-Paul Waru	New Zealand	
The Houses October Built	Bobby Roe	Bobby Roe, Brandy Schaefer, Zack Andrews, Mikey Roe	United States	
I, Frankenstein	Stuart Beattie	Aaron Eckhart, Bill Nighy, Yvonne Strahowski	United States	
It Follows	David Robert Mitchell	Maika Monroe, Keir Gilchrist, Daniel Zovatto	United States	
Jessabelle	Kevin Greutert	Sarah Snook, Mark Webber, David Andrews	United States	
Last Shift	Anthony DiBlasi	Juliana Harkavy, J. Larose, Joshua Mikel	United States	
Life After Beth	Jeff Baena	Aubrey Plaza, Dane DeHaan, John C. Reilly	United States	
Lonely Island	Lian Tao, Wang Kunhao	Li Yiyi, Tian Suhao, Mao Yi	China	
Mercy	Peter Cornwell	Frances O'Connor, Shirley Knight, Chandler Riggs, Joel Courtney, Dylan McDermott, Mark Duplass	United States	
Midnight Hair	Liu Ning	Daniella Wang, Lee Wei, Xuan Lu, Yang Zitong	China	
Monsterz	Hideo Nakata	Tatsuya Fujiwara, Takayuki Yamada	Japan	
Oculus	Mike Flanagan	Karen Gillan, Katee Sackhoff, Brenton Thwaites	United States	
Ouija	Stiles White	Olivia Cooke, Daren Kagasoff, Douglas Smith, Bianca Santos	United States	
Over Your Dead Body	Takashi Miike	Ebizo Ichikawa, Ko Shibasaki, Hideaki Itō	Japan; France	
The Pact 2	Dallas Richard Hallam, Patrick Horvath	Camilla Luddington, Patrick Fischler, Amy Pietz	United States	
Paranormal Activity: The Marked Ones	Christopher Landon	Andrew Jacobs, Jorge Diaz, Gabrielle Walsh	United States	
Parasyte: Part 1	Takashi Yamazaki		Japan	
P.O.V.	Richard Anthony Dunford	Tom Clear, Petroula Kaneti-Dimmer, Judson Vaughan	United Kingdom	
The Purge: Anarchy	James DeMonaco	Frank Grillo, Kiele Sanchez, Michael K. Williams	United States	
Puzzle	Eisuke Naito	Kaho, Shuhei Nomura, Kazuya Takahashi	Japan	
The Quiet Ones	John Pogue	Jared Harris, Sam Claflin, Erin Richards	United Kingdom	
REC 4: Apocalypse	Jaume Balaguero	Manuela Velasco, Héctor Colomé	Spain	
See No Evil 2	Jen Soska, Sylvia Soska	Danielle Harris, Katharine Isabelle, Michael Eklund	United States	
Sharknado 2: The Second One	Anthony Ferrante	Ian Ziering, Tara Reid, Vivica A. Fox	United States	
Slit	Colin Clarke	Miranda Cox, Lilian L'Amour, Alex Wolf	United States	
Stage Fright	Jerome Sable	Allie MacDonald, Douglas Smith, Brandon Uranowitz	United States	
Starry Eyes	Kevin Kolsch, Dennis Widmyer	Alex Essoe, Noah Segan, Pat Healy	United Kingdom	
Strange Blood	Chad Michael Ward	Alexandra Bard, Anna Harr, James Adam Lim	United States	
The Taking of Deborah Logan	Adam Robitel	Jill Larson, Anne Ramsay, Michelle Ang, Ryan Cutrona	United States	
TEN	Sophia Cacciola, Michael J. Epstein	Jade Sylvan, Molly Carlisle, Molly Devon, Karin Webb	United States	
Through the Devil's Eyes	RJ Cusyk	James Andre, Gyana Lua, Hannah Tippit, Tristan S. Bradford	United States	
The Town That Dreaded Sundown	Alfonso Gomez-Rejon	Denis O'Hare, Addison Timlin, Veronica Cartwright	United States	
Tusk	Kevin Smith	Justin Long, Genesis Rodriguez, Haley Joel Osment	United States	
Twilight Online	Maggie To		Hong Kong	
Vengeful Heart	Victor Vũ		Vietnam	
V/H/S: Viral	Various	Patrick Lawrie, Emilia Ares, Celia K. Milius	United States	
What We Do in the Shadows	Taika Waititi, Jemaine Clement	Taika Waititi, Jemaine Clement, Jonathan Brugh	New Zealand	Horror comedy
WolfCop	Lowell Dean	Leo Fafard, Amy Matysio, Jonathan Cherry	Canada	Horror comedy
Wrong Turn 6: Last Resort	Valeri Milev	Anthony Ilott, Chris Jarvis, Sadie Katz	United States	
Wyrmwood	Kiah Roache-Turner	Jay Gallagher, Bianca Bradley, Leon Burchill	Australia	Science fiction horror
Zapatlela 2	Mahesh Kothare	Adinath Kothare, Sonalee Kulkarni, Sai Tamhankar, Makarand Anaspure	India	
Zombeavers	Jordan Rubin		United States	
