= Wukong Bicycle =

Bicycle sharing company in Chongqing, China

- Type: Private
- Industry: Transportation
- Founded: 2016
- Founder: Lei Houyi
- Defunct: July 2017
- Area served: Chongqing, China
- Products: Bicycle rentals
- Parent: Chongqing Zhanguo Technology

Wukong Bicycle (Chinese: 悟空) was a bicycle-sharing company based in Chongqing, China. The company operated a fleet of 1,200 bicycles in Chongqing from January to July 2017, ceasing operations after 90 percent of their bicycles were reported missing.

== History ==
The company was founded by entrepreneur Lei Houyi in 2016, inspired by the success of other bicycle-sharing systems in Beijing and Shanghai. Houyi named the system "Wukong" after the monkey king Sun Wukong in the classic novel Journey to the West. The system debuted in January 2017, with 1,200 bicycles serving 16,000 users in Chongqing, charging 0.5 yuan per ride. It launched shortly after Ofo, a larger service based in Beijing, arrived in the city. The bicycles, manufactured in small factories locally, came without GPS equipment used by larger companies. The lack of GPS equipment led to the theft of 90 percent of Wukong's fleet; additionally, the hilly terrain in Chongqing dissuaded use of the bicycles. Future models were planned come with GPS trackers, along with a national rollout to ten cities by June 2017. On June 21, Wukong announced that it would cease operations within 30 days, retrieving its bicycles and refunding users. Observers called it the first bankruptcy in the Chinese bicycle-sharing industry, which was amid a massive boom.
