= Death Is Here 3 =

Death is Here 3
- Directed by: David Kuan
- Release date: April 4, 2014
- Running time: 93 minutes
- Country: China
- Language: Mandarin
- Box office: ¥35.2 million

Death Is Here 3 (Chinese: 笔仙惊魂3) is a 2014 Chinese horror film directed by David Kuan.

== Reception ==
The film has grossed ¥35.2 million in China.

== See also ==
- BiXian Panic
