= A Gold Medal Winning Tramp Dog =

- Chinese: 金牌流浪狗
- Directed by: Mario
- Release date: January 21, 2014 (China)
- Country: China
- Language: Mandarin

A Gold Medal Winning Tramp Dog (Chinese: 金牌流浪狗) is a 2014 Chinese comedy-drama film directed by Mario (马里奥) and produced by Zhibao He. The story of the film narrates relationship between a young boy and a street dog. The movie was released on 21 January 2014. The film directed by Mario Lo has a run time of 1 hour 21 minutes.

== Plot ==
Lu Fei, a teenage boy found the dog, Dong Dong, wandering on the streets in an almost dying condition. He felt sympathetic towards it and decided to adopt it. Lu Fei soon found out the talent of Dong Dong, and despite the disagreement from his father and the school manager, he kept it to train it for the Gold Medal Winning Tramp Dog championship.

== Cast ==
- Mao Yi
- Lv Hongxu
- Cui Bing
- Wang Lei
- Sun Taojie

== Reception ==
The film received positive to mixed reviews from film critics. In Sohu review, it was written that the film had a "fresh, smooth style and care of stray animals theme".
