= Shining Soul (film) =

- Directed by: Dai Wei
- Starring: Si Ligeng; Chen Yuan; Dai Wei
- Release date: 21 February 2014
- Running time: 90 minutes
- Country: China
- Language: Mandarin
- Box office: US$0.8 million

Shining Soul (Chinese: 闪魂) is a 2014 Chinese crime thriller film directed by Dai Wei.

== Cast ==
- Si Ligeng
- Chen Yuan
- Dai Wei

== Reception ==
The film grossed US$0.8 million in China.
