= Young Friend Forever =

- Directed by: Zhao Chong
- Production companies: Beijing Huaxia Xiongdi International Media Co., Ltd
- Release date: October 10, 2014
- Running time: 90 minutes
- Country: China
- Language: Mandarin
- Box office: ¥0.23 million (China)

Young Friend Forever (Chinese: 我的青春蜜友) is a 2014 Chinese romance film directed by Zhao Chong. It was released on October 10.

== Cast ==
- Sun Qian
- Tai Li
- Peng Bo
- Tang Jingmei
- Zhang Qun
- Li Ruojia
- Wu Hong

== Reception ==
By October 11, the film had earned ¥0.23 million at the Chinese box office.
