= BiXian Panic =

Bunshinsaba
- Directed by: David Kuan
- Screenplay by: Zhou Wei; Liang Xiaoxiao; Zhu Bei
- Starring: Zak Di; Wang Yi; He Dujuan; Chai Biyun; Wu Ma
- Cinematography: Li Hongjian
- Music by: Murota Kenichi
- Release date: 8 June 2012 (China)
- Running time: 92 minutes
- Country: China
- Language: Mandarin
- Box office: US$3.98 million

BiXian Panic (Chinese title: 笔仙惊魂) is a 2012 Chinese horror film directed by David Kuan.

== Cast ==
- Zak Di as Xiao Wu
- Wang Yi as Mu Fan
- He Dujuan as Liu Sisi
- Chai Biyun as Ling Feier
- Wu Ma as Qiao
