= Li Yiyi =

Chinese metallurgist and materials scientist (born 1933)

Li Yiyi (Chinese: 李依依; born 10 October 1933) is a Chinese metallurgist and materials engineer. She served as President of the Institute of Metal Research of the Chinese Academy of Sciences (CAS) from 1990 to 1998. She is an academician of the CAS and The World Academy of Sciences (TWAS).

== Biography ==
Li was born on 10 October 1933 in Beijing, Republic of China, with her ancestral home in Suzhou, Jiangsu Province. She graduated from the Metallurgy Department of Beijing Steel and Iron Institute (now University of Science and Technology Beijing) in 1957. After graduation she worked as a researcher at the Institute of Metal Research of the Chinese Academy of Sciences, and later served as its president from 1990 to 1998.

In the 1970s, Li developed high-strength stainless steel for use at ultra-low temperature. She later developed more than ten different metal alloys including Fe-Ni-Cr, Fe-Mn-Al, Ti-Al, and Ti-Ni. The materials she developed have been used in the water turbines of the Three Gorges Dam, the CRH3 and CRH5 high-speed rail, and nuclear reactors.

Li was elected an academician of the Chinese Academy of Sciences in 1993 and a fellow of The World Academy of Sciences in 1999. She was awarded the Ho Leung Ho Lee Prize in Technological Sciences. For her contributions to the development of new materials, she was honoured with the Lifetime Achievement Award for Metallurgy by the China Metal Society in October 2016.
