= Perfect Beyond =

- Directed by: Yin Bo
- Production companies: Beijing Shengtang Mingxiang Media Co., Ltd
- Release date: January 5, 2014 (China)
- Running time: 105 minutes
- Country: China
- Language: Mandarin
- Box office: ¥2.32 million (China)

Perfect Beyond (Chinese: 完美超越) is a 2014 Chinese comedy-drama film directed by Yin Bo. It was released in China on January 5, 2014.

== Cast ==
- Yan Shuo
- Ji Chen
- Liu Siyou
- Wang Maolei
- Mu Xing
- Yao Xingzhu
- Zhang Yichen

== Reception ==
The film earned ¥2.32 million at the Chinese box office.
