= Ofo (company) =

Chinese bicycle sharing company

ofo
- Type: Private
- Industry: Transportation
- Founded: 2014; 12 years ago
- Founder: Dai Wei
- Fate: Defunct (2020)
- Headquarters: Beijing, China
- Areas served: China; Singapore; Hong Kong
- Key people: Dai Wei
- Products: Bicycle sharing services
- Website: ofo.com (archived)

ofo (/ˈoʊfoʊ/) was a Beijing-based bicycle sharing company founded in 2014. It used a dockless system with a smartphone app to unlock and locate nearby bicycles, charging an hourly rate for use.

In 2017, the ofo company had deployed over 10 million bicycles in 250 cities and 20 countries. The company was valued at up to US$2 billion and had over 62.7 million monthly active users.

In 2018, ofo announced massive reduction in operations, including withdrawing from most US cities and from several entire countries. By 2020, facing a large amount of unpayable debt, the company was no longer operating bike rentals.

== History ==
=== 2014–2016: Founding in China ===
The company was founded in 2014 by five members of the Peking University cycling club as a project that initially focused on bicycle tourism before deciding on bicycle sharing. It was named "ofo" due to the word's visual resemblance to a cyclist on a bicycle. ofo was launched in June 2015 in Beijing, gaining 20,000 users and 2,000 bicycles by October with investment funding from a Peking University alumnus. In 2016, ofo expanded to other cities in China, and had a fleet of 85,000 bicycles by the end of the year. The company raised US$130 million in funding from tech firms Xiaomi and Didi Chuxing in September 2016, allowing it to expand outside China. A Series D funding round in February 2017, led by Didi Chuxing and Russian investor Digital Sky Technologies, raised US$450 million for ofo and valued the company at $1 billion.

=== 2016–2018: International expansion ===
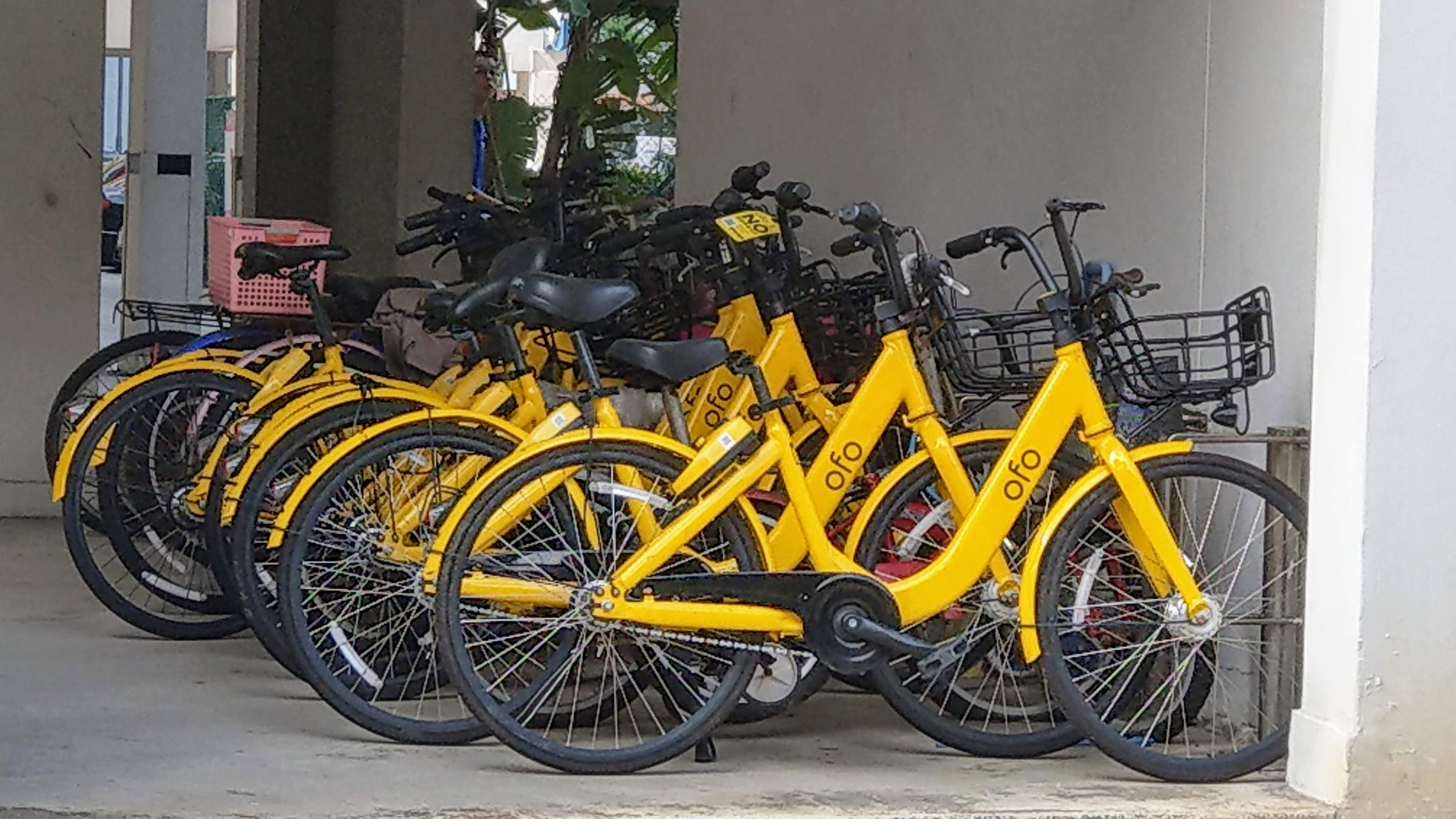
ofo bicycles in Singapore

ofo began expanding outside China in 2017, with launches in Singapore in February 2017; Cambridge, United Kingdom in April; Seattle, United States in August; and Sydney, Australia in October.

In April 2017, it was announced that the United Nations Development Programme has started a partnership to raise public awareness on climate changes. The partnership project, 1 KM Action, led to another collaboration with the Clara Lionel Foundation, an organisation founded by Rihanna, which aims to provide bikes and scholarships to girls in Malawi.

The same month, ofo announced an undisclosed amount of funding from Ant Financial, an Alibaba affiliate.

In July 2017, ofo announced US$700 million of additional funding in a round led by Alibaba, Hony Capital and CITIC PE.

In December 2017, ofo launched its service in Paris, France, and progressively deployed 2,500 bikes over the city of Paris and neighbouring Neuilly-sur-Seine, Boulogne-Billancourt and Levallois-Perret. According to figures communicated by the company in July 2018, the bikes are rented up to four times a day, representing 5,000 to 10,000 daily trips. ofo says the financial accounts for its Paris operations are balanced.

In February 2018, Texas A&M University partnered with ofo and rolled out a bike sharing platform on campus.

ofo raised an additional US$866 million led by Alibaba in March 2018.

For the US market, ofo hired Uber spokesperson and Mandarin speaker Chris Taylor to run US operations.

=== From 2018: Crisis, focusing on "priority" markets, withdrawal ===
After missing the opportunity to merge with Mobike and failing to reach an acquisition deal with Didi, ofo now suffered from consistently high operational costs and lack of additional funding to expand its business.

Amidst a cash crunch, ofo only ordered 80,000 of its expected 5 million annual bicycles.

After Mobike received a US$2.7 billion investment from Meituan-Dianping, ofo began an international and domestic contraction to stay alive.

In an internal meeting, ofo's CEO Dai Wei compared the company's situation to wartime Britain, as portrayed in the film Darkest Hour. He told his staff that they could leave the company then if they did not want to fight until the end.

In July 2018, ofo announced that it will entirely leave several countries and significantly reduce the number of cities served in others in order to focus on "priority" markets. Operations ceased completely in Australia, Austria, Germany (where ofo was present with 3,000 bikes in Berlin for only three months), India (5,000 bikes in Bangalore, Delhi, Chennai, Ahmedabad, Coimbatore, Indore and Pune), Israel, Spain (Granada, Madrid) and Thailand. In the United Kingdom, the company left Cambridge, Norwich, Oxford and Sheffield and cancelled its planned launch in Leeds in order to focus on London only, but withdrew from London in January 2019. In the United States (over 40,000 bikes in 30 locations in June 2018), ofo announced the layoff of 70% of its employees to focus on an unspecified ″handful of cities″. In August, ofo left Dallas, leaving hundreds of bikes at the recycling center and exited Seattle, where it donated some 800 bikes to three nonprofits. In August 2018, China's Didi and Ant Financial weighed a joint US$2 billion buyout of ofo, but Dai Wei said he would even turn down an offer of US$10 billion.

In October 2018 a flood of requests for ofo user deposit refunds started.

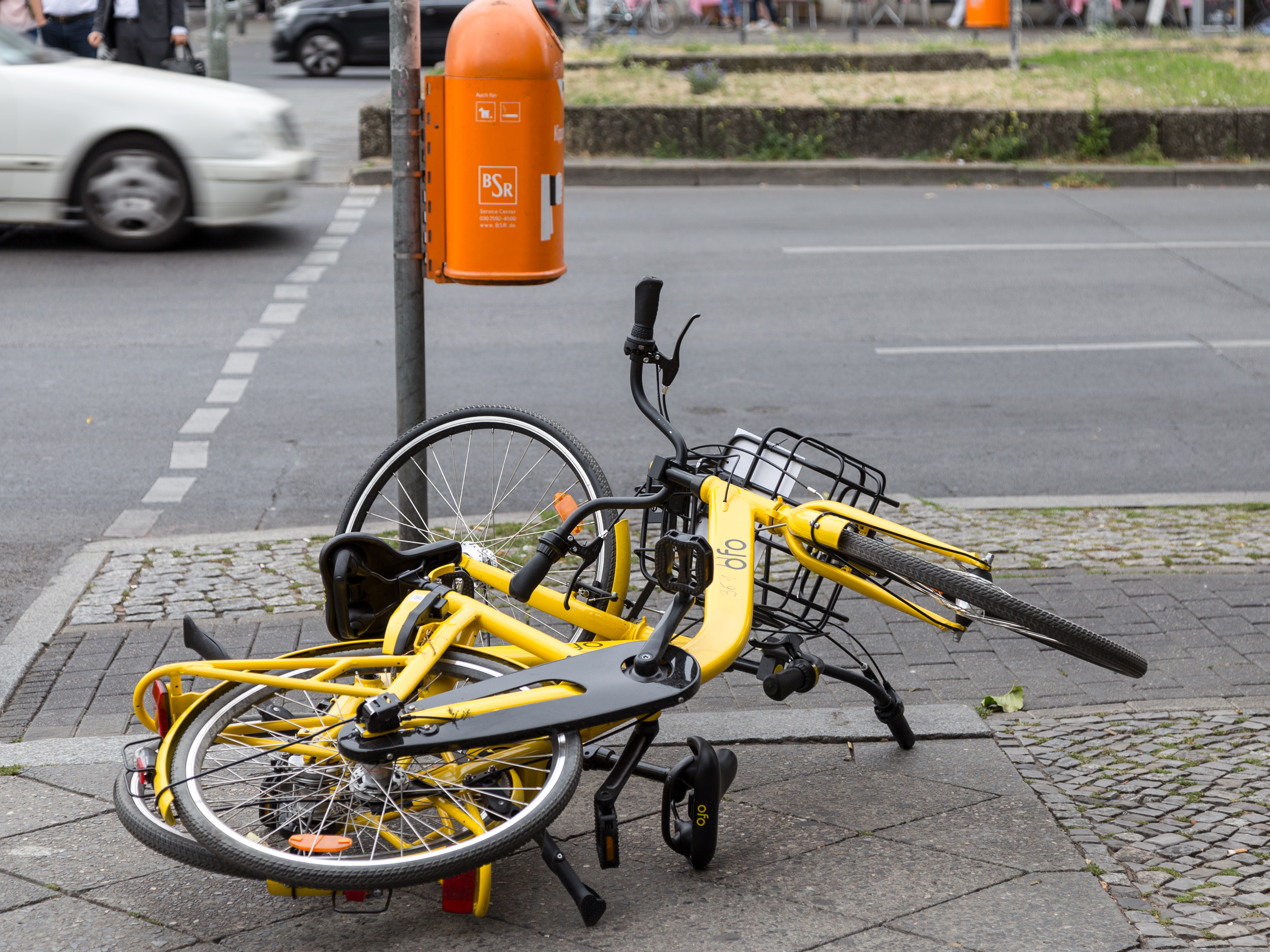
After a few years ofo bicycles was down in Europe (Berlin, Mehringdamm)

In December 2018, ofo considered declaring bankruptcy several times over cash flow issues.

It was reported in January 2019 that ofo had dissolved its international division and offered its 50 remaining employees the option to leave immediately or take a 50% pay cut and transfer to the Chinese business.

ofo's former employees in Singapore also said in January 2019 that the firm's operations in the country have "practically ceased" as there were no personnel left. As of February 3, 2019, ofo's website has become defunct and shows a plain white page. The ofo app still works and bicycle's location are still shown in the app. On January 14, 2019, Singapore's Land Transport Authority suspended ofo's operating license due to its failure to meet regulatory requirements such as implementation of QR code for parking of bike and decreasing its fleet size. ofo was required to remove all its bicycles within a month.

== Usage ==
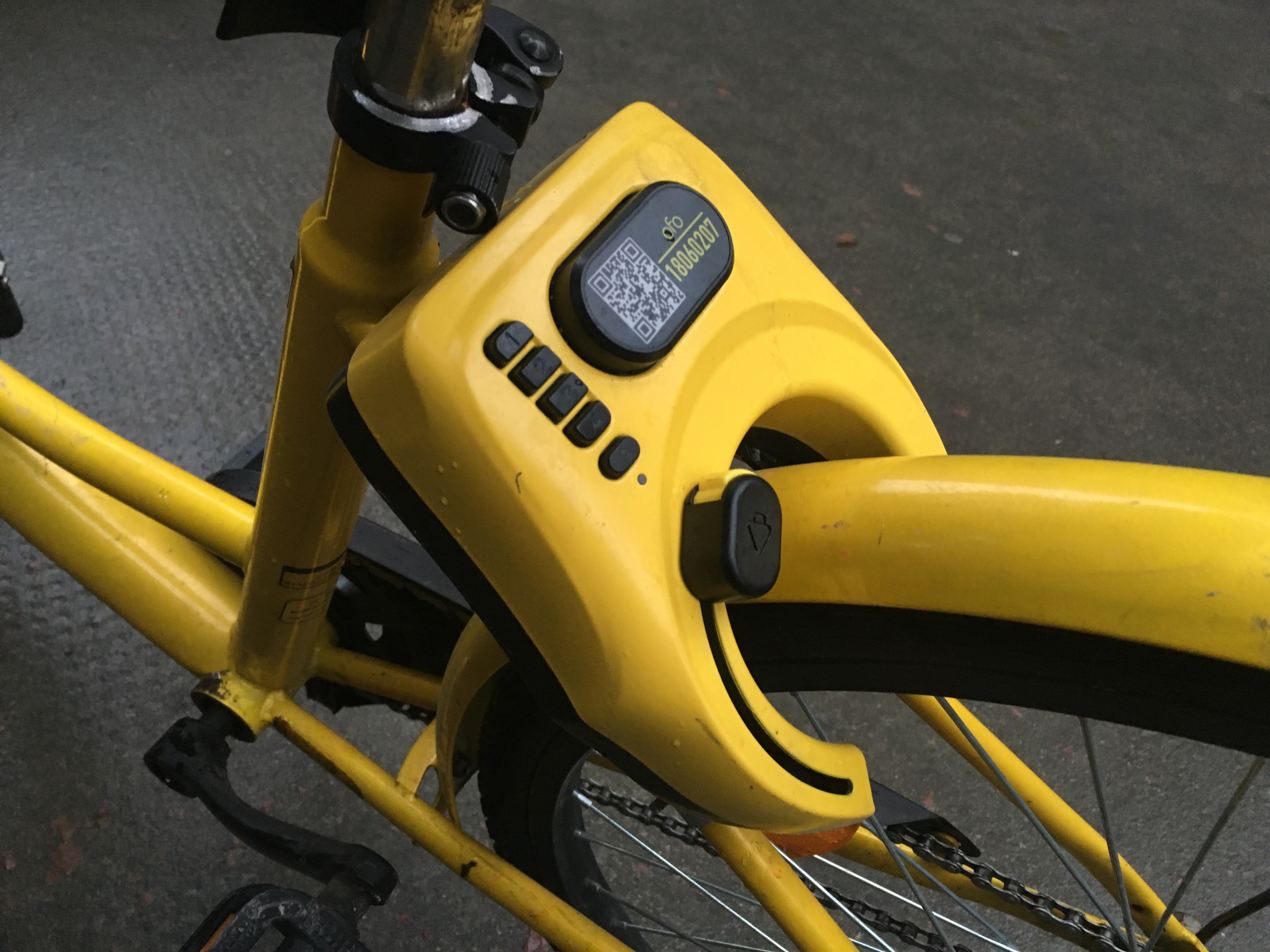
The lock installed on ofo bicycles.

Customers use the company's mobile app on their smartphones to locate nearby bicycles. Each bike has a QR code on the frame, which the customer scans to unlock the bike. ofo bike unlocking is also available on other collaborative apps such as WeChat and Alipay in Mainland China. Each yellow bicycle reports its location via satellite positioning, allowing users to see which bikes are available nearby. Users pay within the app using available payment methods such as credit cards, WeChat Pay or Alipay in China, etc. After customers are finished, they can leave the bike anywhere and lock it. The bicycles use NB-IoT cellular technology for communication with the locks, developed by Huawei and China Telecom.

== Controversy ==
Like many other dockless bike sharing companies, including ReddyBike and oBike, ofo's bikes have raised the ire of several cities, including Melbourne, Dallas, Chicago, and San Diego. Because these bike companies do not ensure the bikes are parked properly, they can clutter sidewalks, blocking pedestrian and handicapped access. Bike clutter has been so extreme that some cities in China have reached "peak bike" capacity, and have begun regulating the number of bikes that may be deployed. ofo was also nicknamed “awful” by those who had a bad experience with the service.

The terms of service for ofo required injury claims to be settled by a private arbitrator. Users were expected to waive their rights to appeal and to join in a class-action lawsuit.

== See also ==
- Hangzhou Public Bicycle
- List of bicycle-sharing systems
