= Zhao Na =

Zhao Na may refer to:

- Zhao Na (cyclist) (born 1984), Chinese cyclist
- Zhao Na (model) (born 2005), Chinese model
