= The Predictor Paul =

- Directed by: Shi Yang
- Starring: Hao Xianghai; Zhang Wei; Xu Jing
- Release date: 4 July 2014
- Running time: 87 minutes
- Country: China
- Language: Mandarin

The Predictor Paul (Chinese: 章鱼哥) is a 2014 Chinese animated comedy fantasy romance film directed by Shi Yang and starring Hao Xianghai, Zhang Wei and Xu Jing.

== Cast ==
- Hao Xianghai
- Zhang Wei
- Xu Jing
