= Zhu Jiaqi =

Chinese association football player

Personal information
- Date of birth: 1 June 1993 (age 33)
- Height: 1.89 m (6 ft 2 in)
- Position: Goalkeeper

Team information
- Current team: Baoding Xuecheng Athletic

Senior career*
Years	Team	Apps	(Gls)
2013	Shenyang Zhongze	0	(0)
2013	→ Shenzhen Fengpeng (loan)		
2014–2017	Shijiazhuang Ever Bright	0	(0)
2018–2019	Yinchuan Helanshan	43	(0)
2020–2021	Jiangxi Beidamen	24	(0)
2022-	Baoding Xuecheng Athletic	0	(0)
- * Club domestic league appearances and goals as of 14:01, 17 May 2022 (UTC)

Zhu Jiaqi (Chinese: 朱嘉琦; born 1 June 1993) is a Chinese footballer currently playing as a goalkeeper for Chinese Club Baoding Xuecheng Athletic.

== Career statistics ==
=== Club ===
As of 24 August 2021.

Club	Season	League			Cup		Other		Total	
Club	Season	Division	Apps	Goals	Apps	Goals	Apps	Goals	Apps	Goals
Shenyang Zhongze	2013	China League One	0	0	0	0	0	0	0	0
Shijiazhuang Ever Bright	2014	China League One	0	0	0	0	0	0	0	0
Shijiazhuang Ever Bright	2015	Chinese Super League	0	0	0	0	0	0	0	0
Shijiazhuang Ever Bright	2016	Chinese Super League	0	0	0	0	0	0	0	0
Shijiazhuang Ever Bright	2017	China League One	0	0	0	0	0	0	0	0
Shijiazhuang Ever Bright	Total		0	0	0	0	0	0	0	0
Yinchuan Helanshan	2018	China League Two	13	0	0	0	2 (Note: Appearances in the China League Two playoffs)	0	15	0
Yinchuan Helanshan	2019	China League Two	27	0	1 (Note: Appearances in the Chinese FA Cup)	0	1	0	29	0
Yinchuan Helanshan	Total		40	0	1	0	3	0	44	0
Jiangxi Beidamen	2020	China League One	5	0	0	0	2 (Note: Appearances in the China League One relegation playoffs)	0	7	0
Jiangxi Beidamen	2021	China League One	14	0	0	0	0	0	14	0
Jiangxi Beidamen	Total		19	0	0	0	2	0	21	0
Career total			4	0	1	0	0	0	5	0
