= Ramani Kalyanam =

2026 Indian Telugu film

- Directed by: Vijay Adireddy
- Written by: Ram jagadeesh (dialogues)
- Produced by: Vijay Adireddy
- Starring: Deepshikha Chandran; Surya Vashistta; Srinivasa Reddy; Chaitu Jonnalagadda; Shyamala
- Cinematography: Aravind Thirukovela
- Edited by: Raviteja Girijala
- Music by: Sooraj S Kurup
- Production company: Kites Creatives
- Release date: 22 May 2026
- Country: India
- Language: Telugu

Ramani Kalyanam is an 2026 Indian Telugu-language romantic drama Written, Directed and produced by Vijay Adireddy. It stars Deepshikha Chandran, Surya Vashistta, Srinivasa Reddy, Chaitu Jonnalagadda, Shyamala and others.

Ramani Kalyanam was theatrically released on 22 May 2026.

== Plot ==
Sanjana is a visually impaired woman who works as a pub singer and takes care of orphaned children. Her life takes a turn when she meets Raj, a man who became paralysed and uses a wheelchair. As they get to know each other, they develop feelings and decide to get married. However, an unexpected revelation about Raj's past creates complications in their relationship.

== Cast ==
- Deepshikha Chandran as Sanjana
- Surya Vashistta as Raj
- Srinivasa Reddy as Kishore
- Chaitu Jonnalagadda as Anand
- Shyamala as Geetha

== Music ==
The soundtrack and background score were composed by Sooraj S Kurup.

Track listing
No.	Title	Lyrics	Singer(s)	Length
1.	"Ramani Kalyanam - Title Track"	Poornachari	Haricharan; Ramya Behara	3:36
2.	"Madhuram Madhuram"	Poornachari	Sooraj S Kurup; Aruna Mary George	3:54
3.	"Kallolam"	Poornachari	Kapil Kapilan; Avani Malhar	3:41
4.	"Karigindi Kaalam"	Purnachary	Ramya Behara	3:22
5.	"Anaganaga"	Purnachary	Aruna Mary George	1:11

== Release and reception ==
The film was released on 22 May 2026.

Suhas Sistu of The Hans India gave 3/5 stars and said "Ramani Kalyanam stands out as a sensitive and emotionally satisfying romantic drama with a meaningful social message." Suresh Kavirayani of Cinema Express gave 1.5/5 stars and opined Ramani Kalyanam fails to impress because it misses the emotional core that such a story demands, while also stating that, most scenes resulting in an artificial tone, and not a single moment truly stands out.

Divya Shree from The Times of India gave 2.5/5 stars and stated "The film is emotionally appealing but follows a predictable storyline with familiar twists." Chetupelli Sanjiv Kumar of Hindustan Times Telugu rated 3/5 stars and praised the cast performances and technicians.
