= Target (2014 film) =

- Directed by: Yang Jiang
- Written by: Fang Wang; Jiang Yang
- Starring: Maria Makarenko; Yang Song; Juncheng Yang
- Production companies: China Sanhuan Audio and Video Community; Nanjing Lan Yinxiang Media Co., Ltd; Jiangsu Daye Entertainment Investment Co., Ltd
- Release date: October 24, 2014
- Running time: 86 minutes
- Country: China
- Languages: Mandarin; English
- Box office: ¥1.57 million (China)

Target (Chinese: 狙击时刻) (Ju ji shi ke) is a 2014 Chinese action suspense crime film directed by Yang Jiang. It was released on October 24.

== Plot summary ==
The film tells the story of an elite sniper's daring counterattack after being severely wounded by an international agent. It shows his extraordinary training and cruel jungle combat.

== Cast ==
- Song Yang
- Yang Juncheng
- Kara Wang
- Maria Makarenko
- Ma Qiang
- Ran Tian

== Reception ==
By November 3, the film had earned ¥1.57 million at the Chinese box office.
