= Feiyu Show =

2014 Chinese documentary film

- Directed by: Sun Hong
- Production companies: Qingying Interaction（Beijing）AD Co., Ltd; Beijing Iqiyi Co., Ltd; Beijing Shiyue Network Technology Co., Ltd; Beijing Yiheng Dongfang Education Technology Co., Ltd
- Release date: October 23, 2014
- Running time: 78 minutes
- Country: China
- Language: Mandarin
- Box office: ¥0.23 million (China)

Feiyu Show (Chinese: 飞鱼秀) is a 2014 Chinese documentary film directed by Sun Hong. It was released in China on October 23, 2014.

== Cast ==
- Xiaofei
- Yu Zhou

== Reception ==
As of October 28, 2014, Feiyu Show had earned ¥0.23 million at the Chinese box office.
