= Bitter Love =

- Directed by: Li Jide
- Production companies: Beijing Laima Fengshang Media Co., Ltd
- Release date: January 10, 2014 (China)
- Running time: 93 minutes
- Country: China
- Language: Mandarin
- Box office: ¥0.14 million (China)

Bitter Love (Chinese: 哭恋) is a 2014 Chinese romantic drama film directed by Li Jide. It was released in China on January 10, 2014.

== Cast ==
- Wang Dazhi
- Wang Erni
- Li Shaofei
- Li Fengming
- Chen Changhai
- Liu Xueping
- Huang Jingyi

== Reception ==
The film earned ¥0.14 million at the Chinese box office.
