= Ex Fighting =

2014 film

- Directed by: Lu Yang
- Production companies: Beijing Hongde Huihuang Investment Co., Ltd
- Release date: October 14, 2014
- Running time: 102 minutes
- Country: China
- Language: Mandarin
- Box office: ¥0.40 million (China)

Ex Fighting (Chinese: 房车奇遇) is a 2014 Chinese comedy romance film directed by Lu Yang. It was released on October 14.

== Cast ==
- Andrew Lin
- Xiong Naijin
- Ma Yuan
- Zhu Dan
- Liu Yun
- Lam Suet
- Wang Haizhen

== Reception ==
By October 20, the film had earned ¥0.40 million at the Chinese box office.
