= Forever Young (2014 film) =

- Directed by: Lu Gengxu
- Production companies: E Mei Film; Beijing Chuanmu Entertainment Co., Ltd; Beijing Yingyitong Entertainment Co., Ltd; Aishiguang（Beijing）Media Co., Ltd; Beijing MaxTimes Culture Development Co., Ltd. Zhejiang Dongyang Tianyu Entertainment Co., Ltd; Beijing Yimei Hudong Media Advertising Co., Ltd
- Release date: January 10, 2014 (China)
- Running time: 96 minutes
- Country: China
- Language: Mandarin
- Box office: ¥2.15 million (China)

Forever Young (Chinese: 怒放之青春再见) is a 2014 Chinese youth romantic drama music film directed by Lu Gengxu. It was released in China on January 10, 2014.

== Cast ==
- Pan Yueming
- Lu Yulai
- Qin Hao
- Zhang Xiaochen
- Swan Wen
- Liu Zi
- Du Haitao
- Wang Xiaokun
- Han Qiuchi
- Wang Dongfang
- Wang Sisi
- Tan Zhuo
- Yan Yikuan
- Yip Sai-Wing
- Zhang Qi
- Cui Jian
- Wang Feng

== Reception ==
The film earned ¥2.15 million at the Chinese box office.
