= Forget All Remember =

- Directed by: Guo Tingbo
- Release date: December 24, 2014
- Running time: 91 minutes
- Country: China
- Language: Mandarin
- Box office: ¥0.23 million (China)

Forget All Remember (Chinese: 37次想你) is a 2014 Chinese youth romance film directed by Guo Tingbo. It was released on December 24.

== Cast ==
- Fu Xinbo
- Michelle Bai
- Tan Weiwei
- Theresa Fu
- Ji Jie
- Simon Chung
- Li Yu

== Reception ==
By December 25, 2014, the film had earned ¥0.23 million at the Chinese box office.
