= Dai Wei =

- 戴威
- Born: 1991 (age 34–35); Xuancheng, Anhui, China
- Education: High School Affiliated to Renmin University of China; Peking University
- Occupation: CEO of ofo
- Known for: founder of ofo

Dai Wei (Chinese: 戴威) is the founder and chief executive officer (CEO) of the Chinese bike-sharing company ofo.

== Early life and education ==
In 2009, he studied in the department of finance of Guanghua School of Management in Peking University. After graduating in 2013, he followed the central branch of the mission in Dongxia town, Dantong county, Qinghai province, and worked as a maths teacher for one year. In 2014, he returned to Peking University for his master's degree.

== Education and career ==
Wei obtained his MSc of Economics from Peking University. In 2014, Wei cofounded bike-sharing startup Ofo, the first dockless sharing bike platform in the world.

After raising hundreds of millions of dollars from a list of powerful investors including Coatue Management, Chinese ride-sharing service Didi Chuxing, and Russian billionaire investor Yuri Milner, Wei expanded Ofo rapidly across China and worldwide. For the US market, Wei personally hired Uber spokesperson and Mandarin speaker Chris Taylor to run ofo US operations.

In 2017, Wei made the Forbes List of 30 under 30 Asia for Consumer Technology.

Lina Feng had joined Wei's senior leadership team in 2018 to manage US and China operations.

After rumors of bankruptcy and a potential buyout by Didi and Ant Financial, on 22 October 2018, the legal representative of Ofo changed. Chen Zhengjiang replaced Wei becoming the legal representative of Dongxia Datong (Beijing) Management Consultancy Co. Ltd., the operating company of Ofo.
