= The Break-up Season =

- Directed by: Yao Yu
- Production companies: Zhongzheng Pictures（Beijing）Co., Ltd; Beijing Qihong Jiayi Media Co., Ltd; Hainan Pengda Media Co., Ltd; Hainan Qihong Jiayi Media Co., Ltd; Jiangsu Dahe Media Co., Ltd; Hainan Zhongshi Media Co., Ltd; Beijing Mengxiang Shike Entertainment Co., Ltd; Beijing Zhanchi Shangteng Media Co., Ltd
- Release date: October 17, 2014
- Running time: 91 minutes
- Country: China
- Language: Mandarin
- Box office: ¥0.37 million (China)

The Break-up Season (Chinese: 毕业那年：分手季) is a 2014 Chinese comedy romance film directed by Yao Yu. It was released on October 17.

== Cast ==
- Gu Liya
- Angel Wei
- Rick Xu
- Zhang Xiaojun
- Ji Feilong
- Zheng Yuzhi
- Ma Junqin
- Wang Jieshi
- Wu Haiyan

== Reception ==
By October 20, the film had earned ¥0.37 million at the Chinese box office.
