= Cherish in Love =

- Directed by: Wang Anqing
- Release date: December 24, 2014
- Running time: 98 minutes
- Country: China
- Language: Mandarin
- Box office: ¥0.15 million (China)

Cherish in Love (Chinese: 爱你不等来生) is a 2014 Chinese romance film directed by Wang Anqing. It was released on December 24.

== Cast ==
- Xiang Tian
- Liu Changchun
- Wang Yufei
- Wang Xiaoxi
- Su Danping
- Liu Yu
- Zhu Yingying
- Chen Yanwen

== Reception ==
By December 25, 2014, the film had earned ¥0.15 million at the Chinese box office.
