= South of the Clouds (2014 film) =

- Directed by: Guo Shuang; Feng Yuan
- Production companies: Zhejiang Tianguang Diying Production Co., Ltd; CPC Yunnan Provincial Party Committee Propaganda Department; Honghe Prefecture Committee Propaganda Department Of The CPC; Maitreya Communist Party Propaganda Department; Youth Film Studio
- Release date: October 17, 2014
- Running time: 96 minutes
- Country: China
- Language: Mandarin
- Box office: ¥2.02 million (China)

South of the Clouds (Chinese: 北回归线) is a 2014 Chinese comedy romance film directed by Guo Shuang and Feng Yuan. It was released on October 17.

== Cast ==
- Aarif Rahman as Li Ming
- Isabelle Huang as A Long
- Wu Xin
- Rombo Shyy
- Liu Zhuoting
- Zhang Yilong
- Cai Lu
- Cui Baoyue
- Liu Lei
- Zhou Wei
- Wang Xiaoshan

== Reception ==
By October 20, the film had earned ¥2.02 million at the Chinese box office.
