= Bloody Doll =

- Directed by: Teruyoshi Ishii
- Release date: December 31, 2014 (China)
- Running time: 84 minutes
- Country: China
- Language: Mandarin
- Box office: CN¥25.8 million (China)

Bloody Doll (Chinese: 怨灵人偶) is a 2014 Chinese horror thriller film directed by Teruyoshi Ishii. It was released on December 31.

== Cast ==
- Jiro Wang
- Zhou Qiqi
- Don Li
- Jiang Jing
- Shen Xinong

== Reception ==
The film earned CN¥25.837 million at the Chinese box office.
