= The Eighth House =

- Directed by: Zhang Li
- Production companies: Beijing Chuangci Kongjian Entertainment Co., Ltd; Shanghai Chuangci Media Co., Ltd; Gaoquan Media (Wuhan) Co., Ltd; Zijingcheng (Beijing) Education Consulting Co., Ltd; Beijing Chuangci Media Co., Ltd; E Mei Film Group
- Release date: September 19, 2014
- Running time: 90 minutes
- Country: China
- Language: Mandarin
- Box office: ¥6.41 million (China)

The Eighth House also known as Horror Floor (Chinese: 诡八楼) is a 2014 Chinese romantic thriller film directed by Zhang Li. It was released on September 19, 2014.

== Cast ==
- Tino Bao
- Ni Jingyang
- Chang Le
- Da Qing
- Lin Peng

== Reception ==
By September 28, it had earned ¥6.41 million at the Chinese box office.
