= Haunted Road =

2014 Chinese-South Korean film by Yijan Tong

- Directed by: Yijian Tong
- Written by: Hong Niangzi
- Starring: Hong Soo-ah; Jiang Chao; Gao Taiyu; Renata Tan; Xu Yue
- Production companies: Xiaoxiang Film Group; Zhejiang Hewen Entertainment Co., Ltd; Dongyang Futian Entertainment Co., Ltd; Bale Hudong （Beijing）Media Co., Ltd; Beijing Jiale Chuangxin Entertainment Co., Ltd
- Release dates: 13 November 2014 (China & South Korea)
- Running time: 90 minutes
- Countries: China; South Korea
- Language: Mandarin
- Box office: CN¥20 million (China)

Haunted Road (simplified Chinese: 怨灵; traditional Chinese: 怨靈; pinyin: Yuànlíng) is a 2014 horror film directed by Yijan Tong and co-written by Hong Niangzi. The film is a co-production between China and South Korea, and stars Hong Soo-ah and Jiang Chao. The film revolves around a group of teenagers who went on a roadtrip being trapped by enchantment on a misty highway after witnessing a fatal car accident.

The film was theatrically released in China and South Korea on 14 November 2014.

== Plot ==
Seven friends: Xuelian, Zengliang, Huazi, Haojian, Ningmeng, Xiaotian, and Dudu, are on their way to attend a friend's wedding when they see the aftermath of a car accident on a highway. Instead of helping the victim, they move about their business until their car breaks down, forcing them to take shelter at a road stop. Throughout the film, Xuelian gives monologues about her friends: how unsympathetic they are to the victim, how they only view love through sex, and how they only reveal their inner feelings when they are in conflict. Seeing that nobody is at the stop, the seven decide to camp out for the night. Dudu, who is single and loves to eat, is dared to take a selfie across the road. When the lights turn off one by one, Dudu escapes to the service store as the ghost chases her. Xiaotian is bribed by Zengliang to take food and drinks, in the process stealing money at the counter as well as the savings of the car accident victim. While celebrating his findings, he is chased and killed by the ghost.

Xuelian and Haojian decide to search for Dudu after a while. When Haojian professes his love for her, Xuelian ignores it so they can continue the search uninterrupted. They are joined by the lovestruck Ningmeng, who is in love with Haojian, while Zengliang and Huazi have sex in the garage. Xuelian, Haojian, and Ningmeng find Dudu's body at the cafeteria. Panicking, Ningmeng is left behind and killed when the ghost wraps tight cloths and clothesline wires around her. Zengliang and Huazi regroup with the other two after they discover Xiaotian's body in the restroom. Blaming Huazi for making the group not check the accident victim, Haojian tries to kill all of them and is able to injure Zengliang's knee, but is knocked out by Xuelian and left to die at the hands of the ghost.

The remaining trio realize that the deaths are foreshadowed by photos sent to the survivors (Dudu's being sent Xiaotian's, Xiaotian's being sent to Zengliang, Ningmeng's being sent to Huazi, and Haojian's being sent to Xuelian). They futilely try to start a stray car at the garage. Jealous at seeing Xuelian tending to Zengliang's wound, Huazi fakes the cursed photo and strikes Xuelian with an ratchet spanner, apparently killing her. The couple leave the compound until Huazi breaks her leg in a bush. Left at her own fate by Zengliang, Huazi is then killed by the ghost. After briefly seeing an illusion of a crowded road stop, Zengliang reunites with Xuelian, who has survived her injuries. However, he leaves her behind on the road only for him to be killed by the ghost.

Left alone on the road, Xuelian is confronted by the ghost and learns the truth: Xuelian is the car accident victim. Abused and tormented since childhood, Xuelian took the final straw when her boyfriend dumped her in favor of another woman. She tried to commit suicide by swerving her car on the highway, but survived; all of the previous events are her near-death experiences. Her six "friends" are really strangers who chose to stop and help her after witnessing the accident; her previous monologues are her reflections about her trauma. The film closes with Xuelian stating that the six strangers have helped her escape from the darkness and her negative views about the world.

== Cast ==
- Hong Soo-ah as Xuelian
- Jiang Chao as Huazi
- Gao Taiyu as Xiaotian
- Renata Tan as Ningmeng
- Xu Yue as Dudu

== Production ==
Haunted Road is loosely adapted from Chinese web novelist Hong Niangzi's novel of the same title, with Hong also serving as the screenwriter. Director Yijan Tong incorporated elements of Asian urban legends into the film, including ghosts building a wall and hotel residents going missing during the Ghost Festival. Tong cited Korean horror films Three and Killer Toon as major influences on the film. The film is a co-production between China and South Korea, with the shoot taking place entirely in China and the production crew composed of both Chinese and South Koreans. The film features South Korean actress Hong Soo-ah in the lead role, marking her debut in a Chinese feature film, and also stars Jiang Chao and Gao Taiyu.

Principal photography took place in 2014 and spanned less than a year, with Hong completing her scenes in July. Hong, who speaks Mandarin fluently, performed in the language during filming, but her character's voice was ultimately dubbed by a voice actress in post-production. In September, the Korean production company Joy N Contents Group acquired the distribution rights for South Korea. On 15 October, the film's theme song "Ghost Love", performed by Chinese singer Cui Tianqi, was released online, marking her first contribution to a film score. Starting 17 October, the film launched a promotional campaign featuring a haunted house created by a Taiwanese crew, which mimicked the film's setting and went on a national exhibition tour prior to the film's release. On 30 October, the film released its promotional poster, notable for being the first 3D film poster in China. Hong Niangzi's novel was published on 1 November before the film was released.

== Release ==
Haunted Road premiered in Beijing on 11 November 2014, followed by theatrical releases in both China and South Korea on 14 November.

== Reception ==
=== Box office ===
The film grossed approximately RMB$10 million in its first week, ranking fifth at the national box office. It reached RMB$18 million after half a month, and concluded its theatrical run with over RMB$20 million in revenue. Wenzhou Daily described the film as "a dark horse at the box office" due to its release coinciding with three Hollywood blockbusters, crediting its commercial success to the film's marketing campaign.

=== Critical reception ===
A review at HorrorNews.net was very critical of the production and called the film "plain bad".

== Home media ==
A DVD version was released in 2015.

== Sequel ==
A sequel, Haunted Road 2, was released in 2017.
