= The Haunted Cinema =

- Directed by: Yuan Jie
- Production companies: Beijing Dongfang Gedian Media Co., Ltd; Shanxi Qiusuo Media Co., Ltd
- Release date: October 30, 2014
- Running time: 87 minutes
- Country: China
- Languages: Mandarin; English
- Box office: ¥9.2 million (China)

The Haunted Cinema (Chinese: 恐怖电影院) is a 2014 Chinese suspense thriller horror film directed by Yuan Jie. It was released on October 30.

== Cast ==
- Liu Yanxi
- Luo Xiang
- Wei Xingyu
- Yu Miao
- Tang Chengjing
- Zhang Qiyan
- Ren Peng
- Jiang Yuxi
- Dai Chao

== Reception ==
By November 3, the film had earned ¥9.22 million at the Chinese box office.
