= Double Exposure (2014 film) =

- Directed by: Li Jinhang
- Production companies: Hangzhou Zhongwen Entertainment Co., Ltd
- Release date: October 17, 2014
- Running time: 91 minutes
- Country: China
- Language: Mandarin
- Box office: ¥3.88 million (China)

Double Exposure (Chinese: 诡替身) is a 2014 Chinese horror thriller film directed by Li Jinhang. It was released on October 17.

== Cast ==
- Qin Wenjing
- Ma Wenlong
- Sabrina Qiu
- Wang Wei
- Wang Ziqiang
- Zhou Xiang
- Muhua Changlong
- Yu Haorui
- Li Chengfeng
- Wang Ting
- Bao Xianjun
- Li Yuan

== Reception ==
By October 20, the film had earned ¥3.88 million at the Chinese box office.
