= Lonely Island (film) =

- Directed by: Lian Tao; Wang Kunhao
- Production companies: Beijing Dongfang Huamian Film Co., Ltd; Beijing Hangmei Entertainment Co., Ltd; Pearl River Pictures Co., Ltd; Beijing Yingshuo Media Co., Ltd; Beijing Bige Mowei Media Co., Ltd
- Release date: October 31, 2014
- Running time: 83 minutes
- Country: China
- Language: Mandarin
- Box office: ¥2.46 million (China)

Lonely Island (simplified Chinese: 孤岛; traditional Chinese: 孤島; pinyin: Gūdǎo) is a 2014 Chinese suspense thriller horror film directed by Lian Tao and Wang Kunhao. It was released on October 31.

== Cast ==
- Li Yiyi
- Tian Suhao
- Mao Yi

== Reception ==
By November 3, the film had earned ¥2.46 million at the Chinese box office.
