= Flower's Curse =

- Directed by: Li Kelong
- Production companies: Hangzhou Jiahuan Culture Co., Ltd; Beijing Xingbang Media Co., Ltd; Suzhou Qinshidai Media Co., Ltd; Fujian Zhuzi Entertainment Co., Ltd; Zhejiang Sanpen Holding Group Co., Ltd
- Release date: December 12, 2014
- Running time: 95 minutes
- Country: China
- Languages: Mandarin; Cantonese
- Box office: ¥0.77 million (China)

Flower's Curse (Chinese: 花咒) is a 2014 Chinese romance horror thriller film directed by Li Kelong. It was released on December 12 in China.

== Cast ==
- Qi Zhi
- Liao Weiwei
- Luo Bin
- Zhang Xinyan
- Tian Yuqing
- Yang Zitong
- Zhang Mengtian

== Box office ==
By December 12, 2014, the film had earned ¥0.77 million at the Chinese box office.
