= List of Chinese films of 2013 =

The following is a list of mainland Chinese films first released in year 2013. There were 273 Chinese feature films released in China in 2013.

== Box office ==
These are the top 10 grossing Chinese films that were released in China in 2013:

Highest-grossing domestic films of 2013 in China
Rank	Title	Domestic gross
1	Journey to the West: Conquering the Demons	$205,000,000
2	So Young	$118,140,000
3	Personal Tailor	$115,520,000
4	Young Detective Dee: Rise of the Sea Dragon	$98,770,000
5	American Dreams in China	$88,570,000
6	Police Story 2013	$86,340,000
7	Finding Mr. Right	$85,380,000
8	Tiny Times	$79,700,000
9	Firestorm	$50,840,000
10	Switch	$47,590,000

== Films released ==
=== January–March ===
Opening		Title	Director	Cast	Genre	Notes	Ref.
J A N U A R Y	1	Forever Love	Kong Lingchen	Guo Xiaoran, Jin Chen, Zhu Zhixuan, Guo Xin, Wang Luyao, Shao Sihan, Jiang Chao, Niu Qun	Romance / Drama		
J A N U A R Y	8	The Grandmaster	Wong Kar-wai	Tony Leung Chiu-Wai, Song Hye-kyo, Zhang Ziyi, Chang Chen, Julian Cheung, Zhao Benshan, Leung Siu-lung, Wang Qingxiang, Cung Le, Xiaoshenyang	Action / Drama / Biography	Mainland-Hong Kong co-production	
J A N U A R Y	11	Born to Love You	Hu Chongxi	Julian Cheung, Mini Fu, Yvonne Yung, Lisa Guo, Dong Wenjun, Zhang Yonghe	Romance / Drama / Comedy		
J A N U A R Y	12	Desperate Rescue	Duan Guoyun	Weng Jiaming, Wang Ji, Gao Liwen, Shi Zhaoqi	Crime / Action		
J A N U A R Y	15	Bring Happiness Home	Fu Huayang	He Jiong, Xie Na, Vega Li, Chapman To, Ni Dahong, Du Haitao, Wu Xin	Drama / Comedy		
J A N U A R Y	15	The King of Comedy	Tang Yu	Sun Xing, Jiu Kong, Zhang Wenqi, Zhong Fuxiang, Xie Yunhong, Sun Ye, Du Haitao	Drama / Comedy		
J A N U A R Y	16	Beyond the Bounds	Li Zhizhou	Tang Yan, Li Qianming, Wen Zhang, Gao Jun, Lily Chow, Wong Yut-fei, Gao Shan	Drama		
J A N U A R Y	18	Blame it on the Phone	Yin Zhe	Tian Liang, Zhang Guoqiang, Shi Ke, Bobby Yip	Drama		
J A N U A R Y	19	Jungle Master	Xu Kerr	Zhang Yin, Zhang Anqi, Wang Xiaobing, Li Zhengxiang, Li Chuanying, Yang Menglu, Gao Qichang, Jiang Yuling	Animation / Fantasy / Comedy / Adventure		
J A N U A R Y	24	The Mythical Ark: Adventures in Love & Happiness	Jian Yaozong	Zu Liqing, Zhang Lin, Liang Ying, Deng Yuting, Gao Quansheng, Liu Hongyun, Zhao Na	Animation / Family / Adventure / Comedy		
J A N U A R Y	25	Little Tigers	Qian Xiaohong	Zhao Zewen, Zhang Yishan, Hu Tianyang, Xiao Dingdong, Ding Liuyuan, Xie Mengwei, Zhu Xinyun, Shi Xiaoman, Guo Jinglin, Yue Hong, Shibuya Tenma, Keiichi Yamasaki, Zhang Zhengyong	Action / War / Comedy / Kids		
J A N U A R Y	25	Pororo, The Racing Adventure	Park Yeong-gyun	Seon Lee, Lee Mi-ja, Jeong Mi-suk, Hong So-yeong	Animation / Drama	Mainland-South Korea co-production	
J A N U A R Y	26	Mysterious Island 2	Chung Kai-cheung	Deng Jiajia, Julian Chen	Drama / Mystery		
J A N U A R Y	29	Angry Kid	Huang Lei	Wang Yiming, Zhang Jiayi, Fan Wei, Jiang Shan, Chen Kun, Zhang Yi, Tao Zeru, Lau Yiwei, Andy Lau	Comedy		
J A N U A R Y	31	Balala the Fairies	Li Xin, Ye Kai	Liao Jingxuan, Jony Sun, Gill Zhou, Huang Anyi, Mikan, Zeng Zhi, Liang Huiyun, Wang Hui, Yuan Qifeng, Sun Rui	Fantasy / Adventure / Kids		
J A N U A R Y	31	Roco Kingdom: The Desire of Dragon	Yu Shengjun		Animation / Drama		
F E B R U A R Y	1	The Chrysalis	Qiu Chuji	Sandrine Pinna, Ren Quan, Lee Wei, Gao Beibei, Cui Jie, Yan Qianqian	Thriller / Mystery / Romance		
F E B R U A R Y	2	The Flying Machine	Martin Clapp, Geoff Lindsey, Dorota Kobiela	Heather Graham, Lang Lang	Animation / Family / Adventure	Mainland-Poland-United Kingdom co-production	
F E B R U A R Y	5	Mark of Youth	Cheung Siu-hung	Alex Fong, Jiao Jiao, Jaki, Wu Junyu, Change Lu, Wu Gang, Wu Ma, Da Qin, Zheng Jianpeng, Huang Fangling, Zhao Weiguo, Chen Jianlin, Tang Tang, Ding Zi-ling, Ning Zi	Drama / Romance / Comedy		
F E B R U A R Y	10	Better and Better	Zhang Yibai, Xie Dongshen	Aaron Kwok, Wang Baoqiang, Sandra Ng, Xu Jinglei, Tong Dawei, Wang Luodan, Tony Leung Ka-fai, Ni Dahong, Jing Tian, Zhang Yi, Christy Chung, Wu Gang, Huang Jue, Zhang Ziyi, Karen Mok, Annie Yi, Gao Qunshu, Lau Yiwei, Lam Suet, Bowie Lam, Wu Momo, Liu Hua, Hua Shao, Andy Lau, Wang Zhifei, Mok Siu-chung, Liu Zhibing	Romance / Musical / Comedy		
F E B R U A R Y	10	Journey to the West: Conquering the Demons	Derek Kwok, Stephen Chow	Wen Zhang, Shu Qi, Huang Bo, Show Lo, Chrissie Chau, Yang Di, Jiro Lee, Xie Jingjing, Xing Yu, Chiu Chi-ling, Tang Yixin, Fung Min-hun, He Wen-hui	Fantasy / Drama / Comedy		
F E B R U A R Y	10	Love Retake	Zhu Shimao	Shin, Li Xiaoran, Yu Shaoqun, Gillian Chung, Yuan Chengjie, Fan Lei, Zhang Dali, Zhao Yingjun, Chyi Chin, Pan Changjiang, Zhao Baogang, Zhang Tielin, Sun Nan, Li Xiaopeng	Romance / Drama		
F E B R U A R Y	12	Say Yes	Chen Zhengdao	Huang Bo, Lin Chiling, Godfrey Gao, Qin Hailu, Tetsuya Takeda	Romance / Comedy	Mainland-Japan co-production	
F E B R U A R Y	12	Together	Clarence Fok	Donnie Yen, Ko Chen-tung, Angelababy, Michelle Chen, Bosco Wong, Chrissie Chau, Evergreen Mak	Romance / Drama	Mainland-Hong Kong co-production	
F E B R U A R Y	14	My Wife's a Cat	Huang Jun	Zhou Yan-hong	Romance / Animation		
F E B R U A R Y	22	Lift to Hell	Ning Jingwu	Lan Chinglung, Chrissie Chau, Tse Kwan-ho, Cai Hongxiang, Yang Qing	Thriller / Drama / Mystery		
F E B R U A R Y	26	Happy Life of Yang Guang	Yang Yi	Yang Yi, Wei Yi, Han Zhao, Gao Jun, Zhang Li, Yang Shaohua, Zhao Jingsheng, Siqin Gaowa, Brenda Wang, Wong Kwong-leung, Shao Feng	Romance / Drama		
M A R C H	1	The Love Flu	Xie Mingxiao	Fan Van, Chen Jie, Xu Deliang, Evelyn Lin, Jin Shijie, Yu Miaohai, Ma Binyin, Leng Haiming, Wang Xinyue	Romance / Comedy		
M A R C H	1	Midnight Microblog	Keke	Deng Ziyi, Danson Tang, Liu Yuqi, Du Juan, Hong Yi-ping, Liu Peng	Thriller / Horror / Mystery		
M A R C H	2	Rang Ai Zhan Fang	Xue Fangmin	Xia Wang, Tang Xiaoran, Tao Siyuan, Yang Yue	Romance / Drama		
M A R C H	4	Youthful Days	Liu Yijun	Hu Jiahua, Sun Jianqi, Chong Danni, Zhang Jiangshiqin, Cheng Taishen, Yan Shikui	Drama / Biography		
M A R C H	5	Lei Feng in 1959	Ning Haiqiang	Zhong Qiu, Ge Xiaofeng, Ning Ning, Liu Zhibing, Feng Guoqing, Yue Hong, Liu Peng, Xiao Tingjia, Li Keung, Ma Yi	Drama		
M A R C H	5	The Sweet Smile	Zhang Yuzhong	Wan Siwei, Tang Guoqiang, Xu Jian, Wu Gang, Li Youbin, Feng Enhe, Ma Xiaowei, Hou Tianlai, Liu Jizhong	Drama / Biography		
M A R C H	8	Chasing is Hurting	Zhong Xuan	Zhong Xuan, Liu Dongsheng, Bo Lin	Drama / Comedy		
M A R C H	8	Fall in Love	Hua Ming	Wallace Chung, Fiona Wang, Ren Zhong, Zhang Li, Wu Xin, He Dujuan, Timmy Hung, Guan Ling, Pu Bajia, Jess Zhang, Xiao Jian, Tonny Song, Ying Jilei	Romance		
M A R C H	8	Falling Flowers	Huo Jianqi	Song Jia, Huang Jue, Li Fengxu, Zhang Tong, Zhang Bo, Wang Renjun, Wu Chao, Kira, Li Yiling	Biography		
M A R C H	8	Midnight Train	Zhang Jiangnan	Huo Siyan, Calvin Li, Shum Siu-lam, Kara Hui	Drama / Mystery / Thriller		
M A R C H	8	Princess and the Seven Kung Fu Masters	Wong Jing, Keung Kwok-man	Sammo Hung, Sandra Ng, Ronald Cheng, Eric Tsang, Wong Cho-lam, Xie Na, Philip Ng, Tong Fei, Yuen Wah, Rose Chan, Jiang Luxia, Meng Yao, Shi Yanneng, Dennis To, Timmy Hung, Xu Minghu, Jo Kuk, Wen Chao	Action / Comedy	Mainland-Hong Kong co-production	
M A R C H	8	Runaway Women	Dong Dong	Fann Wong, Dany Lee, Wang Shasha, Winnie Zhong, Liu Tianyue, Van Fan, Shi Renmao	Drama		
M A R C H	14	Love Deposit	Qu Jiangtao	Xia Yu, Zhou Hong, Jill Hsu, Luo Jingmin, Jiang Han, Chang Yuan, Wang Xiang, Hou Minghao	Romance		
M A R C H	14	Scandals	Li Huatong	Hong Jiantao, Zhou Xiaoou, Jiang Xinyu, Jack Kao, Will Liu, Wu Chao, Zhou Chuchu, Zhang Shaohua, Zhang Bo, Wang Lan	Comedy / Drama		
M A R C H	18	Love Beyond Eternity	Miao Weiji	Yang Jun, Zhan Chunyao, Duan Qiuping, Wang Ting, Feng Zhigang, Zhang Chuanlin	Romance / Opera		
M A R C H	21	Finding Mr. Right	Xue Xiaolu	Tang Wei, Wu Xiubo, Hai Qing, Mai Hongmei, Elaine Jin, Clayton Chitty, Katherine Ramdeen, Victoria Waterhouse, Alex Dafoe, Michael Denis, Brad Harder, Dante Lee Arias, Virgil Davies, Trevor Bess	Comedy / Romance	Mainland-Hong Kong co-production	
M A R C H	22	82 Warriors	Yang Hu	Zhao Yi, Liu Jian, Bai Yu, Gao Junwei, Chi Yuan, Yeung Jing, Peng Jiguo, Xu Min, Zhu Honglin	War / Drama		
M A R C H	22	An End to Killing	Wang Ping	Zhao Youliang, Geng Le, Li Xiaoran, Park Ye-jin, Yu Shaoqun, Hideo Nakaizumi	Drama / War / Action / History	Mainland-South Korea co-production	
M A R C H	28	The House	Li Yuan	Ruby Lin, Patrick Tam, Victor Chen, Na Wei, Cheung Tat-ming, Miao Haojun, Bai Liuxi	Thriller / Drama		
M A R C H	29	Neverland	Wang Mingfei	Zhang Dianfei, Li Sihan, Han Song, Xiao Ming, Chen Ziru, Huang Shan	Drama		
M A R C H	29	The Chef, the Actor, the Scoundrel	Guan Hu	Liu Ye, Zhang Hanyu, Huang Bo, Liang Jing, Chie Tanaka, Wang Xun, Ryu Kohata	Drama / War / Comedy / Action		

=== April–June ===
Opening		Title	Director	Cast	Genre	Notes	Ref.
A P R I L	2	Drug War	Johnnie To	Sun Honglei, Louis Koo, Huang Yi, Wallace Chung, Gao Yunxiang, Li Guangjie, Guo Tao, Li Jing, Lo Hoi-pang, Cheung Siu-fai, Gordon Lam, Michelle Ye, Lam Suet, Wang Siya, Gan Tingting, Patrick Keung, Berg Ng, Ziyi Wang, Gao Xin, Jen Yan, Tan Kai, Xiao Cong	Drama / Action / Crime	Mainland-Hong Kong co-production	
A P R I L	4	A Cherry on a Pomegranate Tree	Chen Li	Shi Chunling, Ning Li, Liao Tingru, Zhang Gang	Drama		
A P R I L	4	Saving General Yang	Ronny Yu	Adam Cheng, Ekin Cheng, Wu Chun, Li Chen, Raymond Lam, Vic Chou, Xu Fan, Bryan Leung, Ady An, Shao Bing, Fu Xinbo, Yu Bo	Ancient-Costume / Action	Mainland-Hong Kong co-production	
A P R I L	12	Jin Tai Lang De Xing Fu Sheng Huo	Li Shuang	Wang Lei, Feeling, Yao Qianyu, Li Xiaomeng	Drama		
A P R I L	12	A Wedding Invitation	Oh Ki-hwan	Peng Yuyan, Bai Baihe, Jiang Jinfu, Pace Wu, Lin Meishiu, Zhao Yingjun, Lan Yuzhen	Romance / Comedy	Mainland-South Korea co-production	
A P R I L	19	The Deadly Bullet	Ren Pengyuan	Peng Jihang, Pu Bajia, Wang Zizi, Mark Du, He Dujuan, Qu Gaowei, Wu Weidong	Action / Drama / Mystery		
A P R I L	19	Lemon	Zhang Jiarui	Leon Jay Williams, Hong So-hee, Jin Sha, Tan Jiexi, Lau Yiwei, Li Boqing, Shen Fa, Wang Xun, Huang Fei, Peng Denghuai	Romance / Comedy		
A P R I L	26	So Young	Zhao Wei	Mark Chao, Han Geng, Yang Zishan, Jiang Shuying, Cya Liu, Zhang Yao, Bao Bei'er, Zheng Kai, Huang Ming, Wang Jiajia, Tong Liya, Pan Hong, Yang Lan, Han Hong	Drama / Romance		
A P R I L	27	Conspirators	Oxide Pang	Aaron Kwok, Nick Cheung, Jiang Yiyan, Li Chenhao, Chen Kuan-tai, Ah Niu, Lam Wai, Wang Jun, Leung Nga-ko, Terence Siufay	Drama / Mystery / Action	Mainland-Hong Kong co-production	
A P R I L	28	The Incredible Truth	Leong Tak-sam	Christy Chung, Liu Yan, Sam Lee, Megumi Kagurazaka, Tony Ho, Jun Kunimura, Haruna Yabuki, Denden, Michiko Kodama, Ikki Funaki, Ma Danni	Horror		
A P R I L	28	Lucky Dog	Wang Song	Hiro Hayama, Huang Lu, Bryan Leung, Jia Wei, Gong Beibi, Xu Pengkai	Fantasy / Comedy		
A P R I L	28	Xi Bai Po: Wang Er Xiao	Yuan Shumei, Yi Shi	Liu Chunyan, Li Yang, Dong Hao, Zhang Anqi, Hong Haitian	Animation / Comedy		
M A Y	1	Qu Li Qiang	Tao Mingxi	Wang Qianyou, Wang Yichan, Zhao Chengshun, Shang Guowei, Hou Tongjiang, Dong Yanhua	Drama / Biography		
M A Y	10	Beloved	Li Xinman	Yu Nan, Yu Qian, Wu Jimu, Shao Hezhijie, Xu Yulan, Gao Xin	Romance / Drama		
M A Y	10	Fallen City	Huang Hong	Huang Jue, Ruby Lin, Ding Yongdai, Sun Min	Action / Drama / Crime		
M A Y	10	Piano Trojan	Lu Zusong	Zhang Mo, Shara Lin, Power Station, Andrew Lin, An Zehao, Jin Peng, Liu Tong, Zhang Zheng, Fu Heng	Drama	Mainland-Taiwan co-production	
M A Y	11	Indomitable Soldiers	Cai Shunan	Fan Yulin, Li Meike	Drama / War		
M A Y	16	Mortician	Cub Chin	Bao Bei'er, Jim Chim, Janice Man, Monica Mok, Sun Xikun, Lam Chi-chung, Stanley Fung, Kristy Yang, Jing Gangshan, Zhang Chao	Thriller / Drama / Comedy		
M A Y	17	American Dreams in China	Peter Chan	Huang Xiaoming, Deng Chao, Tong Dawei, Du Juan, Roy Pollack, Georg Anton, Bettina Skye	Drama		
M A Y	24	The Charge	He Mengfan		Animation / Drama / War		
M A Y	24	Christmas Rose	Charlie Yeung	Aaron Kwok, Gwei Lun-mei, Chang Chen, Xia Yu, Qin Hailu, Liu Kai-chi, Wan Qian, Kam Kwok-leung, Joe Cheung, Pat Ha, Theresa Lee	Drama / Mystery / Crime	Mainland-Hong Kong co-production	
M A Y	24	Don't Talk about High - Rich and Handsome	Zhang Yimo, Zang Xichuan	Gan Lu, Wang Cong, Sun Guihua, Nina Chuo, Wu Ma, Wang Luyao	Comedy		
M A Y	24	Running All the Way	Wang Jun	Li Mengnan, Pan Binglong, Xie Na, Sun Ning, He Jiong, Du Haitao, Wu Xin, Liu Hua, Luo Zhongxu, Wang Qing, Wu Jingan, Yang Shaohua, Liang Tian, Ba Duo, Guo Chendong, An Hu	Drama / Comedy		
M A Y	31	The Adventures of Sinbad 2013	Cheng Bingfeng, Gu Peixing, Ben Pineko	Yang Ou, Wong Aau, Yang Minglu, Xia Lei, Shen Dawei	Animation / Drama		
M A Y	31	Happy Little Submarine 3： Rainbow Treasure	He Zili	Fan Churong, Hong Tianhai, Tan Mantang, Ng Man-fai, Yan Lizhen, Xie Yuanzhen, Hu Qian, Liu Beichen, Zhou Nanfei, Fu Chong, You Jun	Animation / Drama / Kids		
M A Y	31	Kuiba 2	Wang Chuan	Liu Jingluo, Liu Lu, Wang Kai, Ou Lei, Qu Aohui, Guo Chengjian, Yang Chen	Animation / Action / Fantasy / Adventure		
J U N E	1	Let Panda Fly	Zhao Bandi	Zhao Bandi, Jia Shuci	Drama		
J U N E	1	Yang Guang Liu Shou	Ning Jingwu	Ren Yueli	Drama		
J U N E	4	Transcendence	Yuan Fei, Cao Lei, Lee Hwan-ryl	Cui Jian	Documentary / Music		
J U N E	9	7 Assassins	Hung Yan-yan	Eric Tsang, Felix Wong, Gigi Leung, Ray Lui, Guo Tao, Hung Yan-yan, Mok Siu-chung, Michael Wong, Waise Lee, Ni Hongjie, Li Wei, Yu Oh-seong, Simon Yam, Kara Hui, Ti Lung, Rose Chan, Song Xiaobao, Chan Kwok-pong, Bryan Leung, Michael Tong, Shaun Tam, Guo Jiulong, Ben Ng, Ellen Chan, Tony Liu, Chen Kuan-tai, Lawrence Ng, Mars, Fung Hak-on, Cheung Kwok-keung, Jason Pai, Cherie Chan, Ken Lo, Dick Wei	Drama / Action / Adventure	Mainland-Hong Kong co-production	
J U N E	9	The Cosplayers	Pan Shi	Ma Tianyu, Lin Yuan, Guo Jiaming, Liu Yuanuyan, Wang Luwei, Allen Ting, Feng Li, Liu Ye, Ma Yan-ting, Zheng Yecheng	Comedy / Romance		
J U N E	9	Redemption	Zhu Qing	Liu Ye, Ni Ni, Wang Xun, Zhang Doudou, Denny Huang, Sun Guihua, Jiang Yinsheng	Romance / Drama / Mystery		
J U N E	9	Switch	Jay Sun	Andy Lau, Zhang Jingchu, Lin Chi-ling, Tong Dawei, Vanessa Wang, Shi Tianqi, Siqin Gaowa, Aixinjueluo Qixing, Omar Bin Haider, Zhang Guangbei	Action		
J U N E	9	Thrilling Eve	Ding Xiaoyang	Pace Wu, Hans Zhang, Teddy Lin, Chunyu Shanshan, Zhao Yingjun, Zhang Lunshuo, Tao Hai, Min Chunxiao, Huang Fei	Thriller / Comedy		
J U N E	10	The Soccer Way	Qiaoyu	Zhang Yechuan, Zhang Lin, Gao Quansheng, Li Tuan, Liu Hongyun, Guo Yawei, Zu Liqing, Deng Hong, Ding Ling, Li Xuqiao, Zhou Yan, Bai Wenxian, Shi Ler, Guo Rui, Song Lei, Cui San	Animation / Adventure / Martial Arts / Drama		
J U N E	11	Block Buster	Xiang Fei	Ng Man-tat, Liu Yun, Wang Ning, Xiang Fei, Bian Hui, Yu Qian, You Benchang, Ju Hao, Dong Lifan, Xie Yuan, Wang Yunyi, Xiang Neng	Drama / Comedy		
J U N E	14	Mysterious Face	Zhao Xiaoxi	Wu Qijiang, Zhao Shijin	Thriller / Drama / Horror		
J U N E	14	Time to Show	Qian Lujie	Li Wanyi, Li Tingzhe, Er Wen, Gong Zhengnan, Wang Qian, Xu Chong, Ma Tai, Wen Yao, Gou Wei, Tao Lingzhu	Drama		
J U N E	16	The Distant Tian-xiong Mountain	Ma Delin	Wang Yi, Fan Chunxia, Yan Jie	Romance / Drama		
J U N E	21	A Style of a Man in Beijing	Yu Zhilin	Jiang Feng, Nima Songsong, Lam Chi-chung, Lei Si-yin, Da Peng, Qi Yunpeng, Lu Yufei, Yu Zhilin, Shi Xiaoman, Miaomiao, Pan Taiming, Dai Jiajia, Li Zhiyan	Comedy		
J U N E	21	Badges of Fury	Wang Ziming	Jet Li, Wen Zhang, Liu Shishi, Michelle Chen, Liu Yan, Lin Shuang, Collin Chou, Wu Jing, Leung Siu-lung, Tian Liang, Stephy Tang, Alex Fong, Huang Xiaoming, Bryan Leung, Grace Huang, Ma Yili, Michael Tse, Tong Dawei, Raymond Lam, Kevin Cheng, Josie Ho, Stephen Fung, Tin Kai-man, Fung Hak-on	Action / Comedy / Crime		
J U N E	27	Tiny Times	Guo Jingming	Yang Mi, Amber Kuo, Haden Kuo, Xie Yilin, Ko Chen-tung, Rhydian Vaughan, Cheney Chan, Du Tianhao, Jiang Chao, Wang Lin, Yang Yang, Shang Kan, Li Yueming, Ding Qiaowei, Zhu Zhen, Zhang Zimu, Nic Li	Romance / Drama		
J U N E	28	Happy Heroes	Huang Weiming	Liu Hongyun, Zu Qing, Gao Quansheng, Deng Yuting, Yan Yanzi, Jin Ming, Chen Ming, Wang Yiming, Tong Dawei, Liu Yinan, Li Hui-ling, Yang Yang	Animation / Drama		
J U N E	29	Le Le Xiong Qi Huan Zhui Zong	Cheng Baogang		Animation / Drama		

=== July–September ===
Opening		Title	Director	Cast	Genre	Notes	Ref.
J U L Y	4	Singing When We are Young	Liu Juan	Baby Zhang, Ran Xu, Dai Xu, Wu Yiyao, Zhang Zheng, Li Xian, Ni Dahong, Qike, Song Xiaoying, Wang Yanhui, Li Qingke, Lu Qian, Pan Jie, Qi Long	Romance / Drama		
J U L Y	5	The Deadly Strands	Zhao Xiaoxi, Zhao Xiaoou	Leon Dai, Liang Jing, Zhai Wenbin, Kong Qianqian, Zhang Yao, An Hu, Guo Jiaming, Gao Qunshu, Wang Xiaoshan, Wang Yifei, Gu Xiaobai	Thriller / Drama		
J U L Y	5	Man of Tai Chi	Keanu Reeves	Tiger Chen, Keanu Reeves, Karen Mok, Simon Yam, Yu Hai, Ye Qing, Iko Uwais, Jeremy Marinas, Steven Dasz, Brahim Achabbakhe, Sam Lee, Michael Chan, Helene Leclerc, Ocean Hou, Michael Tong, Yoo Sung-jun	Action / Drama / Martial-arts	Mainland-United States co-production	
J U L Y	12	Seer III			Animation		
J U L Y	12	The Supernatural Events on Campus	Guan Er	Zhao Yihuan, Wang Yi, Zhai Wenbin, Kong Qianqian, Chen Meixing, Li Sa, Li Man-yi, Zheng Huixin, Fu Yu-han	Horror		
J U L Y	16	Bunshinsaba 2	Ahn Byeong-ki	Park Han-byul, Xin Zhilei, Zhang Haoran, Zhang Tingting, Li Xinyue, Gao Xinyu, Sun Shaolong, Geng Le, Guo Jingfei, Li Yongbo, Yang Fan	Thriller / Drama / Mystery		
J U L Y	18	Mr. Go	Kim Yong-hwa	Xu Jiao, Sung Dong-il, Lee Jun-hyuk, Kim Heung-rae, Kim Kang-woo, Ahn Su-hee, Kim Hee-won, Kim Jung-tae, Byun Hee-bong, Kim Eung-soo, Joe Odagiri, Kim Jung-eun, Jung In-gi	Action / Comedy / Drama	Mainland-South Korea co-production	
J U L Y	19	Adventure at Flaming Mountains	Xiao Huaihai		Animation / Drama		
J U L Y	19	Crazy Talents	Cao Limin	Li Dan, Wang Donglin, Zhang Li, Sun Dong, Yang Zhiyong	Drama / Comedy		
J U L Y	19	Day of Redemption	Lawrence Ah Mon	Vic Chou, Tong Yao, Bai Yu, Cao Yunjin, Ye Qianyun, Chen Weihan, Liu Xin, Jiang Han, Wen Haibo, Liu Bin, Zhu Zengqiang, Chen Tianmiao, Zhao Guangxing, Wu Li	Romance / Drama		
J U L Y	19	Kung Fu Man	Ning Ying, Yuen Cheung-yan	Tiger Chen, Jiang Mengjie, Shen Lin, Arman Darbo, Yuen Cheung-yan, Vanessa Branch, Igor Darbo, Andre McCoy	Action	Mainland-United States co-production	
J U L Y	20	Wing Chun Xiao Long	Qin Ruiming	Yuen Wah, Wang Xiaolong, Zheng Zhong, Gu Shangwei, Hu Wei	Action / Drama		
J U L Y	20	The Ultimate Task	Sun Lijun	Xie Na, Han Tongsheng, Li Yang, Lu Zhixing, Wang Chinsung, Yang Yifei, Liu Ching	Animation / Drama / Comedy		
J U L Y	24	Chinese Look	Zhan Wenguan	Song Chunli, Zhang Guangbei, Song Chuyan, Hai Yitian, Tang Zixiang	Drama / History		
J U L Y	25	Love is Beautiful	Yin Yue	Dylan Kuo, Liu Ying, Liu Yuqi, Zhou Mi, Huang Ziteng, Lok Tat-wah	Romance / Drama / Adventure / Comedy		
J U L Y	26	Avalokitesvara	Zhang Xin	Chun Li, Siqin Gaowa, Ryoko Nakano, Hideo Nakaizumi, Niu Ben, Nie Yuan, Mu Fengbing, Wang Jianguo	Drama		
J U L Y	26	Ghost of Model	Tong Xiuxuan	Muse Nee, Yang Jun, Tang Ning, Bruce Li, Rao Wei, Yi Wei, Liang Jingyi, Pu Meichen	Thriller / Drama		
A U G U S T	1	I Love Wolffy 2	Ye Kai	Zhao Yingjun, Cai Jingsen, Wang Zhi	Animation / Drama		
A U G U S T	2	Kidnapping of a Big Star	Zhang Jiabei	Daniel Chan, Kristy Yang, Maggie Shiu, Candy Hsu, Du Haitao, Shek Sau, Zhai Ling, Lin Qianwen, Li Qiuyun	Drama / Comedy		
A U G U S T	2	Kunta	Li Lian	Leo Wu, Di Feifei, Zhang Yunyi, Cheng Yuzhu, Meng Xianglong, Hong Haitian	Animation / Adventure / Family / Comedy		
A U G U S T	2	Love Story	Guan Er	Zhao Yihuan, Wang Yi, Mo Xier, Chen Meixing, Dong Yufeng, You Yitian, Qin Hanlei, Zhao Yuqian, Li Jian, Li Manyi	Romance / Drama / Comedy		
A U G U S T	2	Young Style	Liu Jie	Dong Zijian, Qin Hailu, Jiao Gang, Yong Mei, An Yuexi, Xi Lutong, Jiang Xueming, Gao Haoyuan, Tan Chufeng, Li Tianhao, Jiang Xiaohan	Drama		
A U G U S T	8	Crimes of Passion	Gao Qunshu	Angelababy, Huang Xiaoming, Jae Hee, Wei Zi, Su Qing	Romance / Action / Crime		
A U G U S T	8	Tiny Times 2	Guo Jingming	Yang Mi, Amber Kuo, Haden Kuo, Ko Chen-tung, Xie Yilin, Rhydian Vaughan, Cheney Chen, Wang Lin	Romance / Drama		
A U G U S T	9	One Night Surprise	Eva Jin	Fan Bingbing, Aarif Rahman, Pace Wu, Jiang Jinfu, Daniel Henney, Ni Hongjie, Liu Yanchen, Leon Lai, Xu Zheng, Yang Qing, Wong Yat-fei, Zhao Ming, Jamie Zhang, Peng Yan	Romance / Comedy		
A U G U S T	13	The Palace	Pan Anzi	Zhou Dongyu, Chen Xiao, Zhao Liying, Zhu Zixiao, Lu Yi, Winston Chao, Dicky Cheung, Bao Bei'er, Vivian Wu, Annie Yi, Jiang Yiyi, Zhang Zifeng, Huang Shengyi, Jerry Chen, Jess Zhang, Wang Shuang, Wu Yanhe, Zhang Mengsi, Yoko Wang, Shi Fangfei, Zhou Long, Gao Zichun, Wu Yifan	Romance / Drama / Ancient-Costume		
A U G U S T	15	The Best Kids	Du Peng	Qiu Qiming, Liu Yan, Qian Feng, Tian Ge, Zhang Yishan, Xiang Yuewen, Wang Xin, Xu Ting, Li Jinrui, Zeng Yihang	Family / Comedy		
A U G U S T	16	Nightmare	Che Yue	Li Xincong, Qiu Si, Zhou Kaiwen, Wang Yonggui, Che Yue, Li Jia	Drama / Mystery / Thriller		
A U G U S T	16	Lips and Soul	Su Lun	Hua Shao, Li Yuan, Chen Yina, Liu Xuetao, Jing Zichen	Drama / Comedy		
A U G U S T	16	Unbeatable	Dante Lam	Nick Cheung, Peng Yuyan, Mei Ting, Crystal Lee, Andy On, Li Feier, Jack Kao, Patrick Keung, Will Liu, Wang Baoqiang, A-Wei, Michelle Lo	Drama / Action	Mainland-Hong Kong co-production	
A U G U S T	16	Train Heroes	Wu Zhibang	Li Zhengxiang, Xia Lei, Leo Wu, Wang Xiaotong, Zhang Anqi, Zhou Shuai, Fan Junhang, Shen Dawei, Liu Beichen, Yang Ou, Zhao Qianjing, Hai Fan, Liu Qin	Animation / Drama		
A U G U S T	22	Ox Thief	Feng Zili	Ying Da, Miao Pu, Hu Ming, Yan Bingyan, Li Mengnan	Drama / Crime / Comedy		
A U G U S T	23	Fake Fiction	Shao Xiaoli	Xu Zheng, Zhang Zifeng, Vanessa Wang, Zhang Songwen, Wang Taili, Xiao Yang, Yue Xiaojun, Du Peng	Drama / Comedy		
A U G U S T	23	A Moment of Love	Gavin Lin	Vic Chou, Liu Shishi, Zhou Yiwei, Liu Yun	Drama / Romance	Mainland-Taiwan co-production	
A U G U S T	23	Pink Lady: Lover Run	Derek Wu	Hanya Liu, Zhang Xinyu, Liu Fanfei, Huang Yilin, Van Fan, Vivian Dawson, He Minghan, Zheng Kai, Hu Bing, Alan Dawa Dolma, Lin Yuzhi, Sun Xing, Xu Xiyan	Comedy / Romance / Drama		
A U G U S T	23	Unidentified	Chen Chutong	Chen Chutong, Jiang Mengjie, Gao Xin, Wang Wang, Miao Tingru, Zhai Xiaoxing	Drama / Sci-fi / Mystery		
A U G U S T	28	Night Blooming	Liu Fendou	Hu Ming, Wu Damu, Xiao Mai	Thriller / Mystery		
A U G U S T	29	The Stolen Years	Wong Chun-chun	Bai Baihe, Joseph Chang, Christine Fan, Amber An, Ken Lin, Tse Kwan-ho, Queenie Tai, Sky Wu	Romance / Drama		
A U G U S T	30	Flash Play	Xian Xuchu	Alex Fong, Lee Wei, Zhang Xinyu, Timmy Hung, Zhou Shaoguan, Kristy Yang, Guo Tao, Chrissie Chau, Xu Dongdong, Cao Yunjin, You Benchang	Drama / Adventure		
A U G U S T	30	I Am Director	Song Yang	Wang Baoqiang, Xu Fan, Liu Hua, Vincent Chiao, Jin Ming, Gao Tian, Zhang Dianlun	Drana / Comedy		
A U G U S T	30	Sweet Summer Love	Chen Jialin	Eric Wang, Deng Jiajia, Wong Yut-fei, Lam Suet, Annie Wu, Kristy Yang	Romance / Comedy		
S E P T E M B E R	1	Youth Novel	Guo Kuiyong	Zhao Yan, Su Jing, Liu Kang	Romance / Drama		
S E P T E M B E R	6	Dead Sign	Lui Hui	Xu Haiqiao, Jiang Song, Wang Jiexi, Liu Zheng, Yang Lei, Zhang Beibei, Hao Yang, Long Yu	Thriller / Drama / Horror		
S E P T E M B E R	6	Timeless Love	Shen Dong	Li Xiaolu, Leon Jay Williams, Alex Fong, Annie Yi, Liao Jingsheng, Tu Yuming, Liu Dandan, Livia Wang	Romance / Fantasy / Drama / War		
S E P T E M B E R	6	A Young Girl's Destiny	An Zhanjun	Zhang Lixin, Han Pengyi, Wang Kai, Liu Xiaoye, Zhang Fan	Drama / Comedy		
S E P T E M B E R	10	4B Qing Nian Zhi 4 Lou B Zuo	Sun Da	Fu Xinbo, Purba Rygal, Xia Zitong, Annie Liu, Peng Yu, Tian Zitian, Mark Cheng, Theresa Fu, Allie Chan, Dong Lifan	Romance / Comedy		
S E P T E M B E R	10	School Bus	Yu Rongguang	Yu Rongguang, Mindy Quah	Drama		
S E P T E M B E R	13	Silent Witness	Fei Xing	Aaron Kwok, Sun Honglei, Yu Nan, Deng Jiajia, Zhao Lixin, Tong Liya, Ni Hongjie, Chen Sicheng, Cica Zhou	Crime / Mystery		
S E P T E M B E R	17	Luo Jing Shan	Feng Xiaoning	Liu Xiaowei, Lee Jeong	Action / Adventure / War		
S E P T E M B E R	17	My Lucky Star	Dennie Gordon	Zhang Ziyi, Leehom Wang, Kai Zheng, Terri Kwan, Yao Chen, Ruby Lin, Ada Choi, Jack Kao, Morris Rong, Zhang Jin, Singh Hartihan Bitto, Alfred Hsing, Liu Hua	Adventure / Comedy		
S E P T E M B E R	17	My Mother	Gao Genrong	Fan Yulin, Shao Feng, Qu Haifeng, Jerry Wen, Jianan Hailin, Zhang Yijia	Drama		
S E P T E M B E R	18	The Empire Symbol	Lee Tso-nam, Yu Junhao, Tang Weiwen	Pan Yueming, Annie Yi, Hou Yong, Hu Ke	Action / Adventure		
S E P T E M B E R	18	The Ideal City	Sun Bohan	Jaycee Chan, Wang Taili, Xiao Xun, Li Changjiang, Yang Di, Xie Fang	Drama / Comedy		
S E P T E M B E R	18	Love Distance	Ng Lam	Lemon Zhang, Huang Yue, Candace Chuo, Miao Tingru, Wang Yingkai, Soinam Nima	Romance / Drama		
S E P T E M B E R	24	The Wrath of Vajra	Law Wing-cheung	Xing Yu, Zhang Yamei, Steve Seungjun Yoo, Nam Hyun-joon, Jiang Baocheng, Yasuaki Kurata	Action / Drama / Martial-arts		
S E P T E M B E R	28	Farm House 81	Xu Kerr		Animation / Drama / Comedy		
S E P T E M B E R	28	The Fox Lover	Niu Chaoyang	Gillian Chung, Julian Cheung, Kara Hui, Gao Hu, You Benchang, Gong Xinliang, Kenny Kwan, Guo Mingxiang, Yin Guoer, Zhou Yaping, Chen Hani, Jing Lingxiao, Li Chenxin, Ma Yingqiao, Sun Zijun, Wang Zhixuan, Zhuang Jiemeng, Yao Feifei	Fantasy / Romance / Action		
S E P T E M B E R	28	Young Detective Dee: Rise of the Sea Dragon	Tsui Hark	Mark Chao, Feng Shaofeng, Angelababy, Carina Lau, Lin Gengxin, Kim Bum, Hu Dong, Ma Jingjing, Sheng Chien, Lin Chaohsu, Chen Kun	Action / Mystery / Crime / Ancient-Costume	Mainland-Hong Kong co-production	
S E P T E M B E R	29	Bump in the Road	Raymond Yip	Chen Sicheng, Bao Bei'er, Jiang Mengjie, Paw Hee-ching, Liu Hua, Shera Li, Huang Xiaolei, Liu Yun	Drama / Comedy		
S E P T E M B E R	30	72 Hours of Sword Robbing	Xu Jie	Xu Huanshan, Ye Peng, Yang Qing, Zhou Ping	Drama		
S E P T E M B E R	30	Amazing	Sherwood Hu	Huang Xiaoming, Amber Kuo, Kim Ah-joong, Stephen Fung, Eric Mabius, Blackie Chen, Huang Yi, Li Qin, Carmelo Anthony, Yao Ming, Dwight Howard, Scottie Pippen, Yi Jianlian, Wang Zhizhi	Drama / Sport / Romance	Mainland-United States co-production	
S E P T E M B E R	30	Murcielago	Huang Mingsheng	Deng Ziyi, Law Kar-ying, Philip Lau, Duan Huangwei, William He	Thriller / Horror / Mystery		
S E P T E M B E R	30	Out of Inferno	Pang brothers	Sean Lau, Louis Koo, Angelica Lee, Crystal Lee, Chen Sicheng, Ma Yuhe, Jin Qiaoqiao, Zang Jinsheng, Cheung Siu-fai, Joe Ma, Benz Hui, Terence Siufay, Natalie Tong, Xu Jiaqi, Zhang Chi, Tian Zhenwei, Mahei Ayi	Action / Drama / Adventure	Mainland-Hong Kong co-production	

=== October–December ===
Opening		Title	Director	Cast	Genre	Notes	Ref.
O C T O B E R	1	A Doctor, A General	Ma Huilei	Liu Zhibing, Wang Jing, Xu Yuanyuan	Drama / Biography		
O C T O B E R	11	The Game of Hide and Seek	Song Yinxi	Zong Fengyan, Wang Haixiang, Nian Xianer, Yu Jiaqi, Brandy Akiko	Thriller		
O C T O B E R	12	Love Will Tear Us Apart	Li Weiran	Feng Shaofeng, Ni Ni, Niu Baoping, Zhou Dehua, Chang Xiaojing, Ma Sise, Guo Xiaoxiao	Romance / Drama		
O C T O B E R	18	The Love Songs of Tiedan	Hao Jie	Ye Lan, Feng Si, Ge Xia, Feng Yun, Li Yuqing, Hao Guoying, Hang Zhipeng, Du Huanrong	Drama / Comedy		
O C T O B E R	18	Nowhere to Run	Wang Mengyuan		Thriller / Drama / Horror		
O C T O B E R	18	Target Locked	Ning Haiqiang	Wu Qijiang, Nie Yuan, Ning Ning, Liu Zhibing	Action / War		
O C T O B E R	18	Special ID	Clarence Fok	Donnie Yen, Jing Tian, Zhang Hanyu, Collin Chou, Andy On, Ronald Cheng, Paw Hee-ching, Yang Zhigang, Qi Daji, Ng Chi-hung, Ken Lo	Action / Crime / Thriller	Mainland-Hong Kong co-production	
O C T O B E R	25	Princess Show	Huang Xiaoying	Stephy Tang, Tian Liang, Tse Kwan-ho, Zhao Ke, Wong You-nam, Xu Shan, Ye Jing, Song Wenfei, William So, Sun Xi, Tang Xiaoran, Zhang Tingting, Cai Juntao, Ma Zhaozhuang	Romance / Drama / Comedy		
O C T O B E R	25	Fall of Ming	Wang Jing	Leon Dai, Feng Yuanzheng, Feng Bo, Yu Shaoqun, Yang Yang, Hu Xiaoguang, Qian Xuege, Sun Qiang, Ma Jingwu, Si Yuan	Drama / Ancient-Costume		
O C T O B E R	29	A Chilling Cosplay	Wang Guangli	Simon Yam, Vivian Hsu, Yuan Hong, Ying Liu, O Ti, Li Ai, Wu Yue, Winnie Leung, Liu Yiwei, Gao Qunshu, Chen Sicheng	Crime / Drama		
O C T O B E R	29	Striving in Beijing With Love	Kang Bo	Yolanda Yang, Ji Chen, Jia Nailiang, Zhao Ke, Li Jiuxiao, Cao Yu, Zhang Shaogang	Drama		
O C T O B E R	31	Baby Blues	Po-Chih Leong	Raymond Lam, Sheng Jun, Karena Ng, Kate Tsui, Yu Bo, Irene Wan, Lo Hoi-pang, Cheng Qian	Thriller	Mainland-Hong Kong co-production	
O C T O B E R	31	Cold Pupil	Kwang Chiching, Wang Keke	Chrissie Chau, Liu Yuqi, Sammy Hung, Calvin Sun, Wong You-nam, Canti Lau, Sam Lee, Zhang Shixu	Thriller / Drama / Mystery		
N O V E M B E R	1	Angel Warriors	Fu Huayang	Collin Chou, Yu Nan, Xing Yu, Andy On, Pan Shuangshuang, Wangdan Yili, Shi Fanxi, Ryu Kohata, Frieda Hu, Wu Jingyi, Wang Qiuzi, Renata Tan	Action / Adventure / Thriller		
N O V E M B E R	1	Dating Fever	Han Jing	Du Haitao, Xie Yilin, Cecilia Han, Li Jiahang, Feng Mingchao	Romance / Comedy		
N O V E M B E R	1	Pay Back	Fu Xi	Francis Ng, Louis Fan, Deng Ziyi, Lam Suet, Cynthia Khan, Chang Cheng	Drama / Action		
N O V E M B E R	8	Bachelors' Love	Liu Cunming	Chen Hao, Jill Hsu, Zhou Zhi, Daniella Wang, Kong Ergou, Mao Junjie, Wang Ziyi, Xie Wenxuan, Fu Tianjiao, Song Ning	Drama / Comedy		
N O V E M B E R	8	Beijing Flickers	Zhang Yuan	Duan Bowen, Li Xinyun, Han Wenwen, Lu Yulai, Shi Shi, Wang Jingchun, Qin Zihan, Wang Zinuo, Gao Qunshu, Zhao Ningyu, Kong Ergou	Romance / Drama	Entered into the 2012 Toronto International Film Festival	
N O V E M B E R	8	Carpooling Shock	Zhang Li	Tino Bao, Ni Jingyang, Andrew Lin, Zhang Yu, Gina Jin, Guo Yan, Kong Ming, Wang Jinsong	Thriller / Drama		
N O V E M B E R	8	Love Changes	Chen Shuangyin	Huo Nifang, An Yu, Guo Chengcheng, Yan Ying, Ya Wen, Feng Jun, Er Wen	Drama		
N O V E M B E R	8	Love Speaks	Li Zhi	Jaycee Chan, Amber Kuo, Yu Shasha, Qian Rufu, Kang Enhe	Romance		
N O V E M B E R	8	Love You for Loving Me	Ma Zhiyu	Zhang Hanyu, Wang Luodan, Zhu Dan, Wang Bojie, Sun Xing, Li Chengyuan, Zhang Haotian, Lee Wei, Liu Yan, Wang Haoran, Philip Chan	Romance / Drama		
N O V E M B E R	8	Sweetheart Chocolate	Tetsuo Shinohara	Lin Chi-ling, Hiroyuki Ikeuchi, Yusuke Fukuchi, Chen Tingjia, Guo Nianqiu, Yao Yichen, Lin Jiangguo, Tang Qun, Kei Yamamoto, Christopher Lee, Tokie Hidari	Drama	Mainland-Japan co-production Entered into the 2012 Tokyo International Film Festival	
N O V E M B E R	8	The Twins' Code	Liang Kaijie	Jonathan Kos-Read, Law Kar-ying, Sun Xing, Diana Pang, Yeung Yuk-mui, Ji Feilong, Patrick Keung, Lo Hoi-pang	Drama / Mystery		
N O V E M B E R	11	Black Mirror	Xu Bin	Lu Chen, Feng Bo, Zhou Yemang, Han Yifei, Wu Linkai	Thriller / Drama / Horror		
N O V E M B E R	15	My Boyfriends	Chiu Sung-kee	Xie Na, Jiro Wang, Hu Bing, Liu Lingfei, Lee Seung-hyun, Xie Yilin, He Jingjing	Romance / Drama / Comedy		
N O V E M B E R	15	Bu Bu Zhui Hun	Jiang Cheng	Yuan Chengjie, Tan Zhuo, Jill Hsu, Mi Xuedong, Xu Cheng	Thriller / Drama / Mystery		
N O V E M B E R	15	Kungfu Fighter	Kwang Chiching, Chen Tianxing	Chen Tianxing, Liu Hailong, Wang Linna, Shi Lin, Lam Wai, Liu Yongqi, Huang Xiheng	Action / Drama		
N O V E M B E R	22	Control	Kenneth Bi	Daniel Wu, Yao Chen, Simon Yam, Leon Dai, Ady An, Shao Bing, Feng Jiayi, Li Guangjie, Linda Wong, Nie Yuan, Hao Bojie	Thriller / Crime / Mystery	Mainland-Hong Kong co-production	
N O V E M B E R	22	An Irascible Angel	Zhao Ye	Li Zhizhong, Su Miaoling, Charles Hwong, Grace Qiu, Zhang Xu, Zhangjue Ruiqi, Zhang Qijia	Romance / Drama		
N O V E M B E R	26	High Kickers	Xie Yi	Gordon Liu, Huang Shengyi, Mark Cheng, Daniel Chan, Waise Lee	Action / Sport		
N O V E M B E R	29	The Falling Feather	Wang Yi	Zheng Xiaodong, Liu Xiaoxiao, Qu Jingjing, Dong Kefei, Liu Yangyingzi	Drama		
N O V E M B E R	29	Voyage Extraordinaire	Gao Yi, Zhu Yichang		Animation / Fantasy / Adventure		
N O V E M B E R	29	The Wild Strawberries	Chen Bing	Shang Yubo, Zhou Chuchu, Sun Kai, Yang Dong	Drama / Romance		
N O V E M B E R	29	The White Storm	Benny Chan	Sean Lau, Louis Koo, Nick Cheung, Lo Hoi-pang, Yuan Quan, Elanne Kong, Berg Ng, Ken Lo, Ng Doi-yung, Law Lan, Ben Lam, Xing Yu, Christopher Collins, Bure Li, Ma Yuhe, Lee Siu-kei, Vithaya Pansringarm, Treechada Petcharat	Action / Drama / Mystery / Crime	Mainland-Hong Kong co-production	
D E C E M B E R	3	No Man's Land	Ning Hao	Xu Zheng, Huang Bo, Yu Nan, Duo Bujie, Wang Shuangbao, Ba Duo, Tao Hong	Drama / Western / Crime		
D E C E M B E R	6	The Four II	Gordon Chan, Janet Chun	Deng Chao, Liu Yifei, Ronald Cheng, Collin Chou, Jiang Yiyan, Anthony Wong, Wu Xiubo, Liu Yan, Sheren Tang, Waise Lee	Action / Fantasy / Mystery / Martial-arts		
D E C E M B E R	12	Firestorm	Alan Yuen	Andy Lau, Yao Chen, Gordon Lam, Hu Jun, Ray Lui, Patrick Keung, Kenny Wong, Oscar Leung, Michael Tong, Vincent Sze, Terence Yin, Sammy Hung, Cheung Siu-fai, Wong Cho-lam, Michael Wong, Cheung Kwok-keung, Zhou Ziyang, Chen Pei-yan, Grace Wong, Ben Wong, Ricky Chan, Lo Hoi-pang, Edward Chui, Bonnie Sin, Hiro Hayama	Action / Crime	Mainland-Hong Kong co-production	
D E C E M B E R	12	Into Tibet	Cheng Gong		Documentary		
D E C E M B E R	13	My Beautiful Kingdom	Mak Wing-lun	Jiro Wang, Chrissie Chau, Chen Han-dian, Miumiu, Gu Xuan, Jade Lin, Cheng Jun, Shawn Wang, Kiara Li, Benji Wang	Romance / Comedy		
D E C E M B E R	13	Return the Money	Wei Jie, Li Ri	Nie Yuan, Hu Ke, Wang Tonghui, Vincent Chiao, Tong Lei, Feng Jiayi, Liu Yuntian	Comedy		
D E C E M B E R	19	Personal Tailor	Feng Xiaogang	Ge You, Bai Baihe, Li Xiaolu, Zheng Kai, Fan Wei, Song Dandan, Li Chengru, Miao Pu, Du Jiayi, Liang Tian, Guan Xiaotong, Cao Bingkun, Jackie Chan, Wang Baoqiang, Li Yong	Drama / Comedy		
D E C E M B E R	24	Police Story 2013	Ding Sheng	Jackie Chan, Liu Yi, Jing Tian, Zhou Xiaoou, Na Wei, Lau Yiwei, Na Zha, Liu Hailong, Zheng Xiaoning, Yu Rongguang, Liu Peiqi, Wu Yue, Yin Tao, Ma Tianyu, He Jun	Action / Thriller / Drama / Mystery / Crime		
D E C E M B E R	26	Game of Assassins	Miao Shu	Bryan Leung, Jiang Chao, Chen Kuan-tai, Zhou Yichen, Dong Zhihua, Xie Yuanjiang, Xiao Hong, Wang Xiaobao	Drama / Action		
D E C E M B E R	27	I Want You	Chai Yee-wei	Wu Mochou, Li Daimo, Wang Feng, Hua Shao, Zhang Wei, Ding Ding, Wang Ke, Zhao Lu, Da Shan, Zhang Hexuan, Jin Chi, Xuan Xuan, Li Qiuze	Drama / Musical		
D E C E M B E R	27	The Love Experience	Zhi Lei	Anita Yuen, Qiu Xinzhi, Lam Suet, Li Jiahang, Chrissie Chau, Shi Shi	Drama / Comedy		
D E C E M B E R	28	The Frog Kingdom	Nelson Shin	Shi Banyu, Jiang Guijin, Liu Jie	Animation / Drama / Adventure		
D E C E M B E R	28	Lost	Zhang Fan	Lee Wei, Lan Yan, Zhao Chulun	Thriller / Mystery		
D E C E M B E R	28	Space Panda	Zheng Chengfeng		Animation / Adventure / Comedy		
D E C E M B E R	31	Up in the Wind	Teng Huatao	Ni Ni, Jing Boran, Liu Zi, Gesang, Chen Wei, Liu Yase	Drama		

== See also ==
- List of Chinese films of 2012
- List of Chinese films of 2014
