= Fei-Fei =

Fei-Fei, Feifei, or Fei Fei are Chinese given names. Notable people with the given name include:

- Chen Feifei, Chinese racing cyclist
- Feifei Fan (born 1989), Chinese goalball player
- Fong Fei-fei, Taiwanese singer, host and actres
- Fei-Fei Li (born 1976), American computer scientist
- Feifei Li, Chinese computer scientist
- Lin Fei Fei, Chinese-born muralist
- Fei-Fei Liu, Canadian radiation-oncologist and scientist
- Lu Feifei, Chinese footballer
- Ouyang Fei Fei, Taiwanese-Japanese singer
- Qu Feifei, Chinese football player
- Feifei Sui (born 1979), Chinese basketball player
- Fei Fei Sun (born 1989), Chinese model based in New York City
- Feifei Sun (born 1981), Chinese actress
- Wang Feifei, known as Fei, Chinese singer and actress
- Yang Feifei, Chinese rugby sevens player
- Zheng Feifei, Chinese Paralympic powerlifter
- Zhong Feifei (Winnie Zhong), Chinese model and musician
- Lydia Shum (1945–2008), a.k.a. "Fei-Fei", Hong Kong comedian, MC, actress, & singer
- Fei Fei, a fictional character in the 2020 animated film Over the Moon voiced by Cathy Ang

== See also ==
- Heroine Li Feifei, 1925 film
