= Nick Marsh =

Nick Marsh may refer to:

- Nick Marsh (record producer)
- Nick Marsh (American football)
- Nick Marsh, British singer with Flesh for Lulu
