= Xu Dongdong =

Chinese actress and singer (born 1990)

- 徐冬冬
- Born: February 16, 1990 (age 36); Harbin, Heilongjiang, China
- Other name: Raquel Xu
- Education: People's Liberation Army Academy of Art
- Occupations: Actress, singer, model
- Years active: 2007–present
- Agent: Xu Dongdong Studio
- Musical career
- Genres: Mandapop

Xu Dongdong (Chinese: 徐冬冬; pinyin: Xú Dōngdōng; born 16 February 1990) is a Chinese actress, singer and model.

Xu first rose to prominence in 2016 for playing Shen Jiawen, a drug trafficker, in the television series Yu Zui, which attracted more than 100 million views on iQiyi within days of its premiere, making it one of the most popular TV series tailored for the online platform.

== Early life and education ==
Xu was born in Harbin, Heilongjiang on February 16, 1990. At the age of 7, she moved to Beijing. She graduated from the People's Liberation Army Academy of Art.

== Career ==
Xu had her first experience in front of the camera in 2007, and she was chosen to act as a support actor in Tears in the Red City, a television series starring Cao Lan and Li Dongbei. And she subsequently appearing on Oriental King Lion.

Xu had a minor role as Yue Rong in Chen Xiang (2010), which starred Li Yapeng, Tommy Tam, Wu Mian, and Xu Huanshan.

Xu's first film role was a policewoman uncredited appearance in the romance film Eternal Moment (2011). It stars Li Yapeng, Xu Jinglei, Wang Xuebing, and Je Jie. The film grossed ¥200 million on a budget of only ¥10 million.

In 2012, Xu appeared in television series, such as Master Lin in Seoul, The Sent-down Youth and Angry Photographer. She was cast in the gangster television series Skynet 2012. Other cast members are Du Zhiguo, Du Chun, Dai Jiaoqian, and Wu Ma. She participated in Jin Tailang's Happy Life, a romance television series starring Song Dandan, Li Xiaolu and Wang Lei.

Xu appeared as Na Na, a beautiful girl who appeared in the bar, in the thriller film Flash Play (2013). It stars Alex Fong, Zhang Xinyu, Chrissie Chau, Lee Wei, and Timmy Hung. She starred with Purba Rgyal in Letter of Tour. That same year, she starred in the romantic comedy television series Gorgeous Workers, alongside Hans Zhang, Choo Ja-hyun, Ken Chu, and Wu Peirou.

In 2014, Xu played the lead role in the suspense horror thriller mystery film Closed Doors Village. She had a cameo appearance in Lord of Shanghai, an action film starring Hu Jun, Yu Nan, Rhydian Vaughan, and Qin Hao. That same year, she played the drillmaster Meng Xue, the lead role in The First Paratrooper Team, costarring Purba Rgyal and Shao Bing.

Xu had a minor role as Jenni in Love Contractually (2015), which starred Sammi Cheng and Joseph Chang.

In 2016, Xu had key supporting role in the Yu Zui, created by iQiyi. She was praised for her role. After Yu Zui was broadcast, it enjoyed the highest ratings in China and she quickly rose to prominence. She made a guest appearance on Wong Jing's Mission Milano, a Chinese-Hong Kong action adventure comedy film starring Andy Lau, Huang Xiaoming, Shen Teng, Wong Cho-lam, Michelle Hu and Ouyang Nana. She also appeared in Wong Jing and Andrew Lau's From Vegas to Macau III, an action film starring Chow Yun-fat, Andy Lau, Nick Cheung and Li Yuchun. She played Shi Ying in the historical romance drama film Chinese Wine, opposite Van Fan and Huang Yi.

Xu appeared in Chasing the Dragon, an action crime drama film directed by Wong Jing and Jason Kwan. The film stars Andy Lau reprising his role as Lee Rock from the film series of the same name, Donnie Yen as Crippled Ho, based on real life gangster Ng Sik-ho.

== Sponsorship ==
She is the brand ambassador of Ye Shu Pai coconut milk beverage, appearing on tv spots and on the product cans.

== Filmography ==
=== Film ===
Year	English title	Chinese title	Role	Notes
2011	Eternal Moment	将爱情进行到底	Policewoman	
2013	Flash Play	致命闪玩	Na Na	
2013	The Password of Dream	梦的密码	Female lead	
2013	Letter of Tour	信之旅	Ou Shiman	
2014	Closed Doors Village	封门村	Nina	
2014	70 80 90	恋爱789	Deng Jianing	
2014	Lord of Shanghai	上海王	Lu Xianglan	
2015	Love Contractually	合约男女	Jenni	
2016		男神训练营		
2016	A Test of Love Adventure	A测试	Sister S	
2016	Mission Milano	王牌逗王牌	Xue Ji (Snow)	
2016	From Vegas to Macau III	澳门风云3	Female God of Gamblers	
2016	Little Lucky	玛格丽特的春天	Bao Hong	
2016	Chinese Wine	国酒	Shi Ying	
2017		原罪	Zuo Lan	
2017	Chasing the Dragon	追龙	Rose (A Hua)	
2018	Hello Mr. Billionaire		Sha Sha	
2019	A Test of Love Adventure			
2019	Mr. Loser			
2019	The Sexy Guys			
2019	Invisible Tattoo			
2019	The Sword Legend			

=== TV series ===
Year	English title	Chinese title	Role	Notes
2007	Oriental King Lion	东方狮王	Wu Ming	
2007	Tears in the Red City	泪洒红城		
2010	Chen Xiang	血色沉香	Yue Rong	
2012	Master Lin in Seoul	林师傅在首尔	Cui Chun'ai	
2012	The Sent-down Youth	知青	Lin Li	
2012	Jin Tailang's Happy Life	金太郎的幸福生活	Xiao Yu	
2012	Ordinary Time	平凡的岁月	Xu Danxia	
2012	Skynet 2012	天网2012	Zhu Xiao	
2012	Angry Photographer	愤怒的摄影师	Lin Yaohua	
2013	Gorgeous Workers	华丽上班族	Qin Jialing	
2013	Rapture and Found	欢天喜地俏冤家	Chu Yue	
2014	The Happy Life of Housewife	煮妇的幸福生活	Meng Nan	
2014	The First Paratrooper Team	第一伞兵队	Meng Xue	
2016	Yu Zui	余罪	Shen Jiawen	
2018	Guardian Angel 2018 Web Drama	Cici Baby		

=== MV ===
Year	English title	Chinese title	Singer	Notes
2008	Half of Love	半个爱情	Li Jian	
2008	Promotional Copy	路一直都在	Eason Chan	

== Music ==
Year	English title	Chinese title	Notes
2013	Love You So Much	爱你那么多	
