= Fruit Rockers =

2015 film

- Directed by: Jian Wei
- Starring: Le Chang; Daniella Wang; David Chen
- Production companies: Beijing Huatong Yinhai Media Co. Shenzhen Wanxiang Weiying Media Co. Shenzhen Xiushentang Trade Co.
- Release date: 27 November 2015
- Running time: 98 minutes
- Country: China
- Language: Mandarin

Fruit Rockers is a 2015 Chinese comedy film directed by Jian Wei and starring Linsheng Chen, Le Chang, and Daniella Wang. The movie won the "Recommended Domestic Feature Film Award." It was Jian's first big-screen work.

The theme songs of the three concerts in the film were also sung by director Wei Jian.

== Cast ==
- Le Chang as Apple
- Daniella Wang as Banana
- David Chen as Brother Zhen
- Linsheng Chen as Adam
- Yi Xu as Durian
- Anastasiya Sedikova as Strawberry
