= Love Contractually =

- Poster
- Chinese: 合约男女
- Directed by: Liu Guonan
- Written by: Zhu Zhu; Tian Xiaowei
- Starring: Sammi Cheng; Joseph Chang
- Cinematography: Sha Jincheng
- Edited by: Fang Qian
- Music by: Nathan Wang
- Production company: Bona Film Group et al.
- Distributed by: Horgos Bona Media; Huaxia Film Distribution
- Release date: 14 February 2017
- Running time: 96 minutes
- Country: China
- Language: Mandarin
- Box office: CN¥59.5 million

Love Contractually is a 2017 Chinese romantic comedy film directed by Liu Guonan and starring Sammi Cheng and Joseph Chang. It was released in China by Horgos Bona Media and Huaxia Film Distribution on 14 February 2017.

== Plot ==
Xiao Bo is a courier deliveryman who rides a modified classic motorcycle. He is working to fund his nephew's ear implant surgery. Ye Jin is a CEO who falls out of love due to her fiancé cheating; the fiancé's affair causes her to hate the color yellow, since Ye Jin saw him exchanging discussions with someone else via a yellow notepad; as a result, Ye Jin forces her employees to remove items that are yellow, causing commotion.

Ye Jin then tells her secretary of pregnancy without marriage that she wishes to have a baby via in vitro fertilization (IVF) and a surrogate sperm donor. She tells her assistant to handle the matter of finding the sperm donor secretly. The assistant then creates a fake job interview, in which Ye Jin interviews the potential candidates for sperm donation, who think that they are being interviewed for a job as a personal assistant. After screening multiple candidates, Ye Jin's wishes do not come true, so she gives up. However, before Ye Jin gave up, Xiao Bo, who was delivering a package for her, saw the advertisement for a personal assistant, and became interested in the job, as he needed money.

Later on, a former employee of Ye Jin, who was mad for being dismissed for falsifying information, tries to stab Ye Jin, who is saved by Xiao Bo; Ye Jin then feels a connection with Xiao Bo and interviews him after he tells her that he would like to be her assistant. However, after Xiao Bo gets the job, he is often disorganized and late for work, which displeases Ye Jin, leading her to threaten to fire him. One day, while on the way to a meeting with a big client, Xiao Bo is stuck in traffic twice, until he asks for his motorcycle, which his friend brings. Ye Jin reluctantly sits on it with Xiao Bo, and the two of them arrive in time for their meeting with their client. The client, who happens to love classical motorbikes, is amazed by Ye Jin's willingness to sit on one. They agreed to become partners, which makes Ye Jin see Xiao Bo in a new light.

Ye Jin then gets a call from a care center, which Xiao Bo drives Ye Jin to; when they arrive at the care center, Ye Jin's father, who has Alzheimer's disease, is there. Xiao Bo criticizes Ye Jin for how she treats her father and brings him to her house. Ye Jin becomes angry at Xiao Bo, causing him to quit, and she sends a message asking for a penalty for unilaterally canceling the sperm donation contract. Ye Jin later says why she is hostile to her father and asks why Xiao Bo is adamant about earning money, so he tells Ye Jin that he needs money for his nephew's surgery. Xiao Bo and Ye Jin drink wine and then sleep side by side until the next morning.

Afterwards, Ye Jin and Xiao Bo go to Paris for the IVF process; Ye Jin's friend notices that both Ye Jin and Xiao Bo love each other, but Ye Jin is determined to carry her baby without Xiao Bo; the IVF process is successful. Ye Jin sees how Xiao Bo interacts with the kids at the party, which was hosted by Ye Jin's best friend, Sophie, and her husband.

Xiao Bo's nephew's ear surgery is a success, but all that Xiao Bo can think about is Ye Jin and their unborn baby. Xiao Bo then makes a storybook on the love that occurred between him and Ye Jin and ships it to France, where Ye Jin stayed for the period of the pregnancy, not knowing that Ye Jin had a miscarriage and experienced depression as a result. When Ye Jin receives the package, it amplifies the effects of her depression, causing her to disappear from her home, which worries Sophie and her husband. Xiao Bo then arrives to the same house and learns about Ye Jin's miscarriage and depression.

Sophie's husband finds Ye Jin near a cliff. Xiao Bo tells her the story of a fallen soldier who died while skydiving with his older brother and tells Ye Jin that if she wants to die, he will die as well. Xiao Bo then hugs Ye Jin as they fall down the cliff. Xiao Bo opens his parachute and they fly across the skies of France until they land on a cathedral, where Xiao Bo and Ye Jin kiss one another. An epilogue shows that Xiao Bo and Ye Jin have two babies.

== Cast ==
- Sammi Cheng as Ye Jin (also known as Katrina)
- Joseph Chang as Xiao Bo
- Lam Suet as Ye Jin's Father
- Feng Wenjuan as Vivian
- Xianzi
- Jin Qiaoqiao
- Terence Yin as Qin Feng
- Li Mao
- Xu Dongdong

== Reception ==
The film has grossed CN¥59.5 million in China.
