= The Right Mistake =

- 将错就错
- Directed by: Wang Ning
- Production companies: China Film Co., Ltd; Beijing Aoning Tengwei Advertising Co., Ltd; China Movie Channel SARFT; Guangdong Guangshi Media Co., Ltd; Beijing Yumu Xingchen Media Co., Ltd; Tianyou（Beijing）Media Co., Ltd
- Distributed by: China Film Co., Ltd; YL Pictures
- Release date: 5 March 2015
- Running time: 92 minutes
- Country: China
- Language: Mandarin
- Box office: US$3.65 million (China)

The Right Mistake (Chinese: 将错就错) is a 2015 Chinese romantic comedy film directed by Wang Ning. It was released on 5 March 2015.

== Cast ==
- Xiaoshenyang
- Tian Liang
- Jordan Chan
- Lynn Hung
- Li Chengru
- Christy Chung
- Ying Da
- Fann Wong
- Wang Lidan

== Box office ==
The film opened at No. 8 in its opening weekend at the Chinese box office with US$3.65 million.
