= The Stormy Night (2015 film) =

- Poster
- Chinese: 雨夜惊魂
- Directed by: Liu Tianrong
- Starring: Lan Yan; Daniella Wang
- Production companies: Beijing Yuhuanlong Media; Beijing Laigu Media; Shenzhen Jinqiangwei Entertainment; Hefei Yunshui Media 北京瑄然飞扬影视文化有限公司
- Distributed by: 北京鱼化龙电影发行有限公司; Shenzhen Jinqiangwei Film Distribution; Haining Mantou Media 维乐享电影文化（北京）有限公司
- Release date: 6 November 2015
- Running time: 80 minutes
- Country: China
- Language: Mandarin
- Box office: CN¥0.64 million

The Stormy Night (Chinese: 雨夜惊魂) is a 2015 Chinese horror thriller film directed by Liu Tianrong. It was released on 6 November 2015.

== Cast ==
- Lan Yan
- Daniella Wang
- Dong Yufeng

== Reception ==
The film has earned CN¥0.64 million at the Chinese box office.
