= Daniella Wang =

Chinese actress

- 王李丹妮
- Born: Wang Lidan (王李丹); August 6, 1989 (age 37); Nanyang, Henan, China
- Education: Beijing Zhongbei King Art School
- Occupations: Actress; model
- Years active: 2010–present
- Notable work: Due West: Our Sex Journey
- Modeling information
- Height: 175 cm (5 ft 9 in)
- Hair color: Black
- Eye color: Black

Daniella Wang (Chinese: 王李丹妮; pinyin: Wánglǐ Dānní; born 6 August 1989), born Wang Lidan (Chinese: 王李丹; pinyin: Wáng Lǐdān), is a Chinese actress and fashion model of Mongolian ethnicity. Daniella Wang rose to fame after acting in Hong Kong Category III film Due West: Our Sex Journey. Her other films include Bachelors' Love (2013), Midnight Hair (2014), Fruit Rockers (2015), and The Stormy Night (2015). She starred as Guanyin in the TV series Words of Snakes, and as Lisa Hu in Rules.

== Life and career ==
Born in Nanyang, Henan on August 6, 1989, Daniella Wang graduated from Beijing Zhongbei King Art School (北京中北英皇艺术学校).

She began her career as a fashion model in 2010, when she attended the China Fashion Underwear Model Contest.

Wang's first film role was an uncredited appearance in the film Red Rock.

Wang rose to fame after portraying Xiaosi in the Hong Kong Category III film Due West: Our Sex Journey.

In 2013, she acted alongside Chen Hao and Jill Hsu in the romantic comedy film Bachelors' Love.

In 2014, Wang was cast in the thriller film Midnight Hair, in which she played Xiaomei, the wife of Lee Wei's character. She had a minor role in The Stormy Night, which also stars Lan Yan as Dou Kou.

In 2017, she played Lisa Hu in Rules.

== Filmography ==
=== Film ===
| Year | Title | Chinese title | Role | Notes |
|---|---|---|---|---|
| 2009 | Red Rock | 红色石头 | | |
| 2009 | Southern Territory Red Lady | | | |
| 2011 | Love Never Dies | 堵车 | | |
| 2012 | Due West: Our Sex Journey | 一路向西 | Xiaosi | |
| 2013 | Lost Yacht | 谜失的游艇 | Tong Hua | |
| 2013 | Lost Love 33 Years | 失恋三十三年 | Nannan | |
| 2013 | Bachelors' Love | 光的棍 | Mo Xaiomo | |
| 2014 | Delete My Love | 百变爱人 | | |
| 2014 | Midnight Hair | 夜半梳头 | Xiaomei | |
| 2014 | The Light of Darkness | 黑暗之光 | Herself | |
| 2015 | The Stormy Night | 雨夜惊魂 | | |
| 2015 | Fruit Rockers | 摇滚水果 | | |
| 2015 | —N/a | 诡面少女 | | |
| 2015 | The Right Mistake | 将错就错 | Beautiful girl | |
| 2016 | Visit the Widow Village in the Night | 夜闯寡妇村 | La Xixona | |
| 2016 | —N/a | 亡牌女主播 | Danny | |
| 2016 | —N/a | 微天堂 | Jing Ru | |
| 2016 | My WiFi Girlfriend | 我的WiFi女友 | Wang Cuifen | |
| 2018 | Immortal & Demons | 捉妖大仙 | | |
| 2018 | Scent of a Love | 聞香識愛 | | |
| 2018 | My VR Girlfriend | 我的VR女友 | | |
| 2018 | Midnight Cosmetic Room | 午夜整容室 | | |
| 2019 | My 12 Loves | | | |
| 2019 | The Love of Immortal | 畫春功之書中自有顏如玉 | | |
| 2020 | Gold pirate | 武神蘇乞兒2黃金海盜 | | |

=== Television ===
| Year | Title | Chinese title | Role | Notes |
|---|---|---|---|---|
| 2014 | Two Idiots | 废柴兄弟 | Professor Wang | |
| 2015 | Words of Snakes | 大话蛇仙 | Guanyin | |
| 2017 | Rules | 人间规则 | Lisa Hu | |
