= Midnight Hair =

- Directed by: Liu Ning
- Starring: Daniella Wang; Lee Wei; Xuan Lu; Yang Zitong; Dai Xiangyu; Sun Guitian; Ermayina
- Release date: June 13, 2014
- Running time: 94 minutes
- Country: China
- Language: Mandarin
- Box office: US$2,120,000

Midnight Hair (simplified Chinese: 夜半梳头; traditional Chinese: 夜半梳頭; pinyin: Yèbàn Shūtóu) is a 2014 Chinese horror thriller film directed by Liu Ning. It was released in China on 13 June 2014.

== Plot ==
A Mu moves with his wife, Le Xiaomei, who is two months pregnant, to a mountainside villa owned by his friend, A Ming. The villa is decorated with paintings of two boys playing string game and there is also a locked room A Mu claimed belonging to A Ming. Supernatural occurrences begin to haunt the couple, including a red doll that stalks Xiaomei, a music tape that plays a string game song, and most importantly, a ghostly woman with long hair and white dress. The doll is disposed of by A Mu at Xiaomei's request, while the paintings always resurface back whenever Xiaomei tries to remove it. A Mu also sees a woman in black robe who seems to watch him while going to work every day.

One day, the two visit the orphanage that A Mu grew up in to become fundraisers. Xiaomei learns about a loner orphan in A Mu's generation named Xiaoshan who died when he was 10 years old. After a series of boxes containing increasingly threatening messages are left at his doorstep, A Mu installs security cameras around the house. That night, Xiaomei watches the footage to find a cloaked figure leaving the house. She decides to break into A Ming's room, finding more paintings of the boys and the disposed red doll. Spooked by the woman, Xiaomei runs away, pulling some of the woman's hair in the process, and falls off the stairs, causing her baby's miscarriage.

Arriving back at home from the hospital, Xiaomei forces A Mu to reveal the truth about Qingqing, his fellow orphan and childhood friend together with A Ming. A Mu and Qingqing maintain their relationship well to adulthood, but Qingqing apparently left him for a rich man when he struggled on money. She was subsequently killed by A Ming, who justified his actions due to her unfaithfulness. A Ming buried her body and showed it to A Mu the previous night, despite Xiaomei's claims about the hair. Another box is soon delivered to the couple, warning about not combing the hair during midnight, a trait of Qingqing. Xiaomei does just that and summons the woman in white, who tells her that A Ming does not exist.

From A Mu's orphanage, Xiaomei learns that "A Ming" is a nickname given to Xiaoshan, the son of two imprisoned thieves whose only friend in the orphanage was A Mu. One day, the two escaped from a locked room they were imprisoned in for robbery but slipped through the roofs. The dean chose to save A Mu over A Ming, as A Mu is her grandson born out of wedlock. She promptly gave offerings for A Ming, but suffered a heart attack and died with her face burnt. Xiaomei is visited by the woman in white, revealed to be Qingqing's younger half-sister, Yu Xiaohan. Xiaohan apologizes for the miscarriage and states that she wants Mu Kainan, A Mu's real name, to confess in his murder of Qingqing, the latter having supported Xiaohan's leukemia treatment and being the only family who supported her. She does this by haunting him, as "people would tell the truth if they are scared". A Mu arrives, exhibiting his dissociative identity disorder by constantly switching between his A Mu and A Ming's persona. In his A Ming's persona, he knocks out Xiaomei and bounds her, confirming his deeds including the murder of his grandmother. However, he is unable to kill her due to A Mu's memories of their relationship resurfacing. A Mu decides to commit suicide to prevent himself from harming Xiaomei even further.

Xiaomei visits Xiaohan at the hospital to inform her that A Mu left some money for her and Qingqing so she could pay her bills, wishing her recovery and saying that she is not alone anymore. Next she visits A Mu's orphanage and is horrified when she meets a new girl, Yangyang, carrying the red doll. Yangyang sings the string game song and a hand grabs the doll before the movie cuts off.

== Cast ==
- Daniella Wang
- Lee Wei
- Xuan Lu
- Yang Zitong
- Dai Xiangyu
- Sun Guitian
- Ermayina

== Reception ==
The film has grossed ¥5.16 million in China.
