= Xiao Juan =

Song by Tan Weiwei
- Producer: Nick Marsh

"Xiao Juan" (Chinese: 小娟 (化名), read as "Xiǎo juān (huàmíng)") is a 2020 pop song about domestic violence by Tan Weiwei and produced by Nick Marsh. Xiǎo Juān, little Juan, is a typical girl's name, the bracketed (huàmíng) means (pseudonym).

The track is from Tan's album 3811.
