= Yin Yue =

Chinese songwriter

- 尹约
- Occupations: Songwriter, Producer

Yin Yue, is a Chinese songwriter, producer, and the writer and editor in chief of the talk show, Morning Call. With her work Blue Parachute, Yin Yue won the Best Lyricist Award of the 25th Oriental Billboard. Yin Yue is also a recipient of Forbes China 30 Under 30 List, Class of 2019. On December 11, 2020, Xiao Juan, lyrics written by Yin Yue, was released. Other award-winning songs written by Yin Yue include "Silence".

== Career ==
Yin Yue started her creative career as a writer for the talk show Morning Call. In 2015, Yin Yue became the editor in chief of Morning Call.

Since 2014, Yin Yue has written songs for singers, actors and artists such as Na Ying, Zhou Shen, Tan Weiwei, Faye Wong, Jack Ma, Liang Bo, Hua Chenyu, Lao Lang, Wang Kai, Jam Hsiao, Sa dingding, Chen Sicheng, Jike Junyi, Huang Ling, Guan Zhe, Aarif Rahman, Huang Xiaoming, Jeff Chang, Jin Zhiwen, Li Yuchun, etc.

On March 26, 2019, Dashi Music Copyright announced that Yin Yue is now represented by the Dashi as a songwriter.

On May 2, 2019, Yin Yue presented four works of hers, "Silence", "Big Fish", "Yesterday: To Buenos Aires " and "Shadow" at the forum of “Mandopop: 40 Years of Chinese Popular Music and Culture”.

In 2020, Yin Yue served as vocal director and producer for Zhou Shen to participate in music competition programs.

== Album produced ==
“The Deepest Deep": Zhou Shen’s debut album produced and co-written by Yin Yue, was released on Nov 6th, 2017. On March 26, 2018, Yin Yue won the Best Lyricist Award of the 25th Oriental Billboard for the Blue Parachute from this album.

"3811": on December 11, 2020, Tan Weiwei's album "3811" was officially released, in which Yin Yue wrote lyrics for five songs.

== Awards ==
In 2018, Yin Yue won the Best Lyricist Award of the 25th Oriental Billboard with her work Blue Parachute.

Forbes China 30 Under 30, Class of 2019

== Award-winning works ==
| Release date | Songs and singers | Contributions | Awards |
|---|---|---|---|
| 2015-04-19 | Silence performed by Na Ying | Lyricist | Top 20 Hits Award in the first half of 2015 of Global Pop Music Top Hits Chart - Won |
| 2015-04-19 | Silence performed by Na Ying | Lyricist | Top Ten Hits of the 23rd Oriental Billboard - Won |
| 2015-04-19 | Silence performed by Na Ying | Lyricist | Since 1978 New Era Film and Television Festival Award - Nominated |
| 2015-08-08 | Roses and deer Zhou Shen | Producer Lyricist | Top Ten Hits of the Year in Asia New Hits Chart – Won |
| 2015-08-08 | Roses and deer Zhou Shen | Producer Lyricist | Top 10 Mainland Pioneer songs of the year |
| 2015-08-08 | Roses and deer Zhou Shen | Producer Lyricist | Top Ten Hits of the 24th Oriental Billboard - Won |
| 2015-08-08 | Roses and deer Zhou Shen | Producer Lyricist | Most Popular Karaoke MV in 22nd Global Chinese Chart - Won |
| 2015-08-08 | Roses and deer Zhou Shen | Producer Lyricist | Best Live Performance of Channel V in the 22nd Global Chinese Chart - Won |
| 2015-08-08 | Roses and deer Zhou Shen | Producer Lyricist | Best Neo-Chinese Singing Award "Bird's Nest" Neo-Chinese Music Blissful Night - Won |
| 2017-10-27 | Blue parachute performed by Zhou Shen | Producer Cowriter | Best Lyricist Award of the 25th Oriental Billboard - Won |
| 2017-11-06 | The Deepest Deep（Album）Zhou Shen’s debut album | Producer Lyricist | Annual Top Hit Award of Niuer Chart - Won Top Ten Hits of the 24th Oriental Billboard - Won |
| 2017-11-06 | The Deepest Deep（Album）Zhou Shen’s debut album | Producer Lyricist | 2018 CNR Musicdradio Annual Award - Nominated |
| 2019-11-08 | Wishing for Your Heart, Never be Apart.performed by Zhou Shen | Producer Lyricist | Top Ten OST Hits in 2019 QQ Peak Music Chart - Won |
| 2020-04-10 | Ring the Doorbell for Myself to Listen performed by Zhou Shen | Producer Cowriter | Top Ten Hits of 2020 Sina Cultural and Entertainment festival - Won |
| 2021-12-11 | Feeling Her | Cowriter | Top Annual 10 Hits of the 3rd Tencent Music Entertainment Awards - Won |

== The song list ==
| Release date | Songs | Contributions | Descriptions | note |
|---|---|---|---|---|
| 2014-09-24 | Eagles Flying in September | Lyricist | Co-wrote with Gao Xiaosong; The theme song of tropic of Cancer, sung by Huang Ling and Li Zhiting | |
| 2015-04-15 | Departure | Lyricist | Co-wrote lyrics with Gao Xiaosong. OST of the movie You Are My Sunshine.Performed by Huang Xiaoming | |
| 2015-04-19 | Silence | Lyricist | Theme song of the movie You Are My Sunshine. Performed by Na Ying | |
| 2015-07-01 | Being-towards-death | Lyricist | Theme song of the documentary, The Dreamer Kai-Fu Lee, Being-towards-death Performed by Jike Junyi | |
| 2015-08-08 | Rose and Deer | Lyricist | First released as a single, and then included in Zhou Shen’s debut album The Deepest of Deep | |
| 2015-11-20 | Daiming Dingding | Lyricist | Included in Sa Dingding’s album The Butterfly Dream | |
| 2016-01-15 | My university | Lyricist | Theme song of the series Brother Sleeping On My Upper Bunk Performed by: Jam Hsiao | |
| 2016-03-08 | Rampage | Lyricist | OST of the movie Brother Sleeping On My Upper Bunk Performed by Hua Chenyu | |
| 2016-05-18 | Take My Hand | Lyricist | "X-Men: Apocalypse" Promo Song in China Performed by Tan Weiwei | |
| 2016-05-20 | Big Fish | Lyricist | OST of the animated film "Big Fish and Begonia" Later included in Zhou Shen’s debut album The Deepest of Deep | |
| 2016-07-10 | Too Early to Say Love You | Lyricist | To youth (TV Series) Ending Theme/Song Performed by: Na Ying | |
| 2016-07-18 | Everything Happens For The Best | Lyricist | Co-wrote with Qu Wanting Performed by: Qu Wanting | |
| 2016-08-03 | To Be Free | Lyricist | Promo song of the movie The Warriors Gate Performed by: Hua Chenyu | |
| 2016-08-05 | The Age of Women’s Empowerment | Lyricist | Included in EP Flourishing Summer Performed by: Tan Weiwei | |
| 2016-08-05 | Without Asking Why | Lyricist | Theme song of the movie Time Raiders Performed by: Tan Weiwei | |
| 2016-10-25 | You | Lyricist | First released as a single, then included in Zhou Shen’s debut album The Deepest of Deep | |
| 2017-02-06 | The Starry Night, The Starry Sea | Lyricist | The opening theme song of the TV series The Starry Night, The Starry Sea. Performed by Jin Zhiwen | |
| 2017-02-10 | Echo | Lyricist | The ending theme song of the TV series The Starry Night, The Starry Sea. Performed by Zhou Shen | |
| 2017-02-14 | Starry Sea in Summer Night | Lyricist | The theme song of the TV series " The Starry Night, The Starry Sea. Performed by Jeff Chang | |
| 2017-05-04 | A Book of Insomnia | Lyricist | Included in EP Thriving Spring.Performed by Tan Weiwei | |
| 2017-05-04 | Yesterday: To Buenos Aires | Lyricist | Included in EP Thriving Spring.Performed by Tan Weiwei | |
| 2017-05-18 | For the One You Love | Lyricist | The ending theme song of the TV series "The Return of the Undercover".Performed by Tan Weiwei | |
| 2017-10-27 | Blue Parachute | Lyricist | Co-wrote lyrics with Gao Xiaosong; Won Best Lyricist Award of the 25th Oriental Billboard. Included in Zhou Shen’s debut album The Deepest of Deep | |
| 2017-11-02 | Shallow | Lyricist | Included in Zhou Shen’s debut album The Deepest of Deep | |
| 2017-11-06 | Brother | Lyricist | Included in Zhou Shen’s debut album The Deepest of Deep | |
| 2017-11-06 | Face the Blade | Lyricist | Included in Zhou Shen’s debut album The Deepest of Deep | |
| 2017-11-06 | Scenery | making | Included in Zhou Shen’s debut album The Deepest of Deep | |
| 2017-11-06 | White wall | Lyricist | Included in Zhou Shen’s debut album The Deepest of Deep | |
| 2017-11-06 | A Lingering Thought | Lyricist | Co-wrote lyrics with Gao Xiaosong; Included in Zhou Shen’s debut album The Deepest of Deep | |
| 2017-11-11 | Feng Qing Yang | Lyricist | heme song of the film Gong Shou Dao. Performed by Faye Wong & Jack Ma | |
| 2017-11-20 | Yet Not A Touch | Lyricist | OST of the movie The Dreaming Man Performed by Guan Zhe | |
| 2017-12 | Till We Meet Again | Lyricist | Performed by Fan Bingbing, gaoyunxiang | |
| 2018-01-10 | Flashback | Lyricist | Promo song of the film A Better Tomorrow 2018 Performed by Wang Kai | |
| 2018-04-13 | The Legend of Shanghai | Lyricist | The opening theme song of the TV series Great Expectations Performed by Chen Sicheng | |
| 2018-09-06 | Shadow | Lyricist | The theme song of Zhang Yimou's movie Shadow.Performed by Tan Weiwei & Liang Bo | |
| 2019-02-05 | Pegasus | Lyricist | OST of Han Han's movie Pegasus. Performed by Lao Lang | |
| 2019-10-15 | Ambition | Lyricist | The promo song in China of Ang Lee's film Gemini Man Performed by Li Yuchun | |
| 2019-11-08 | Wishing for Your Heart, Never be Apart. | Lyricist | The theme song of the TV series Royal Nirvana Performed by Zhou Shen | |
| 2019-11-08 | Crane and Flame | Composer and Lyricist | The ending theme song of the TV series Royal Nirvana Performed by Sa Dingding | |
| 2020-04-10 | Ring the Doorbell for Myself to Listen | Lyricist | Co-wrote lyrics with Gao Xiaosong; Live performed by Zhou Shen at Singer 2020. | |
| 2020-03-08 | Zhang Cunxian | Lyricist | Included in Tan Weiwei’s album 3811 | |
| 2020-07-08 | A Guo | Lyricist | Included in Tan Weiwei’s album 3811 | |
| 2020-08-04 | Sword and Song | Lyricist | Co-wrote lyrics with Gao Xiaosong. Performed by Mao Buyi | |
| 2020-08-18 | Yu Xuanji | Lyricist | Included in Tan Weiwei’s album 3811 | |
| 2020-08-11 | Suzhou River | Lyricist | The ending theme song of the movie The Eight Hundred. Performed by Andrea Bocelli Na Ying | |
| 2020-10-12 | Wu Chunfang | Lyricist | Included in Tan Weiwei’s album 3811 | |
| 2020-12-11 | Xiao Juan (Pseudonym) | Lyricist | Included in Tan Weiwei’s album 3811 | |
| 2021-01-22 | Return to You | Lyricist | Theme song of the movie The Yin Yang Master Performed by Zhou Shen | |
| 2021-04-13 | Feeing Her | Cowriter | Included in Cai Xukun’s album Lost Top Annual 10 Hits of the 3rd Tencent Music Entertainment Awards Winner | |
