= Nick Marsh (record producer) =

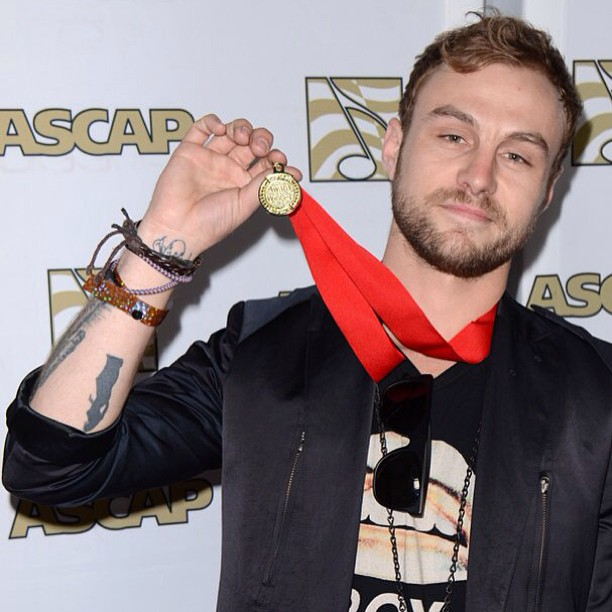
- Nicholas Brian Marsh aka Public at the 2013 ASCAP

Background information
- Also known as: Public
- Born: Nicholas Brian Marsh; January 31, 1986 (age 40)
- Origin: Palo Alto, California, United States
- Genres: Dance, electronic, pop
- Occupations: Songwriter, record producer, DJ, artist
- Years active: 2007–2020

Nicholas Marsh (born January 31, 1986, Palo Alto, California, United States) (also known as "Public") is an American Grammy Award nominated record producer and songwriter, and 2012 ASCAP "most performed songs of the year" award winner. He has worked with Chris Brown, Babyface, John Legend, Cheryl Cole, Kelis, Seal, DJ Paul, Dizzee Rascal, N-dubz, Kerli, Priscilla Renea, Brian "BK" Kennedy, The Black Eyed Peas, Jesse McCartney, The Noisettes and William Orbit amongst others.

== Biography ==
Nicholas Brian Marsh was born in Palo Alto, California. Marsh's father is from Blackpool, England and his mother is from Mountain View, California. Marsh began playing guitar at the age of 10, and at 11 had begun tooling with 4-track tape recorders. Marsh grew up playing in punk bands and was an avid soccer player. After attending Berklee College of Music for a brief stint, Nick gave up garage bands and moved onto electronic music and DJing. After three years of touring and DJing in the bay area, Marsh moved from San Francisco to LA and began working with the production team "Free School". Together they worked on a number of releases including the Grammy award-winning "FAME" and the Grammy nominated "Graffiti", and the Grammy nominated "Fortune". In the Summer of 2011, Marsh left Free School to perform/DJ under the name "Public", and continued to write and produce with various songwriters and artists. Marsh also co-wrote Chris Brown's smash hit "Don't Wake Me Up' which won the ASCAP award for most performed songs of the year in 2012 alongside Alain Whyte, Alessandro "Alle" Benassi, Brian "BK" Kennedy, Brown, Marco "Benny" Benassi, Michael McHenry, Priscilla Renea Hamilton, Ryan Buendia and William Orbit, which went number one in three countries.

Sponsorships include Moog Music and D16 Group.

== Public ==
Public is the dance-electronic project formed by Nick Marsh. Public has performed with The Crystal Method, Afrika Bambaataa, DJ Skeet Skeet and Deadmau5. Marsh also performed select dates of the 2013 Identity Festival alongside Eric Prydz, Hardwell, Wolfgang Gartner, Chuckie, Bingo Players, Porter Robinson, Adrian Lux, Paul Van Dyk and Kerli, amongst others. Public sports a custom disco ball mask created and designed by Marsh. The mask also appears in Chris Brown's video "Look at Me Now", in which Marsh had designed the mask especially for Brown.

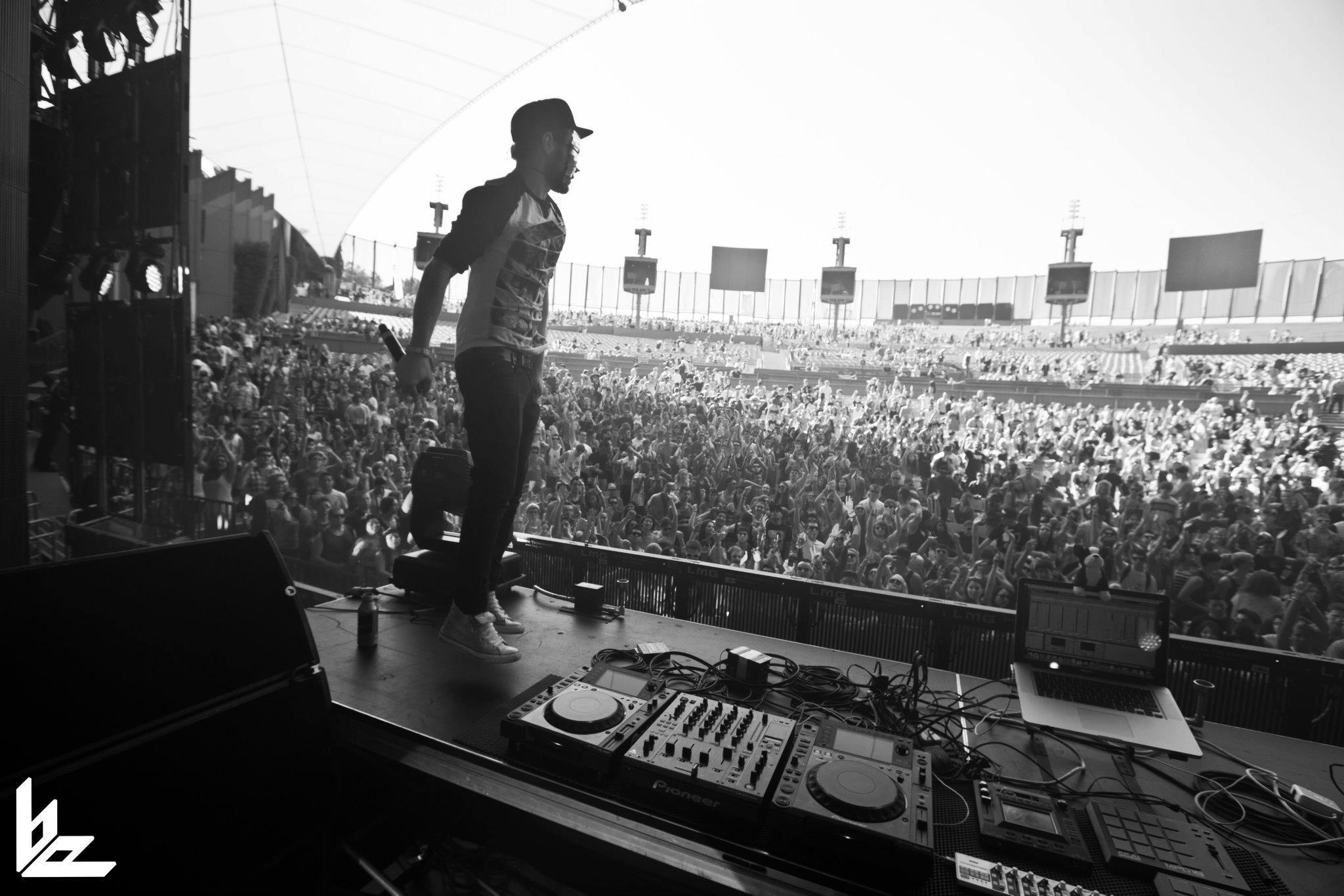
Public performing the main stage at Identity Festival in Mountain View, CA 2012

Public's first single "THANK U!!!" reached number 16 on Music Week's Club Charts in the UK, and was also released by Ministry of Sound Australia. A video was shot in Los Angeles and released on July 6, 2012.

== Additional work ==
Nick Marsh has provided music for various commercials. Clients include Scion, Redbull and Rubber duck.

== Writing and Production credits ==
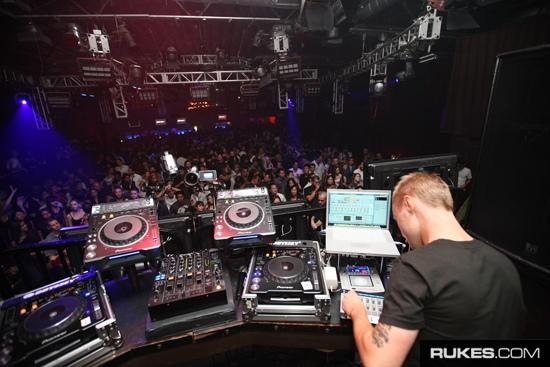
Public performing at the Vanguard in Hollywood, CA

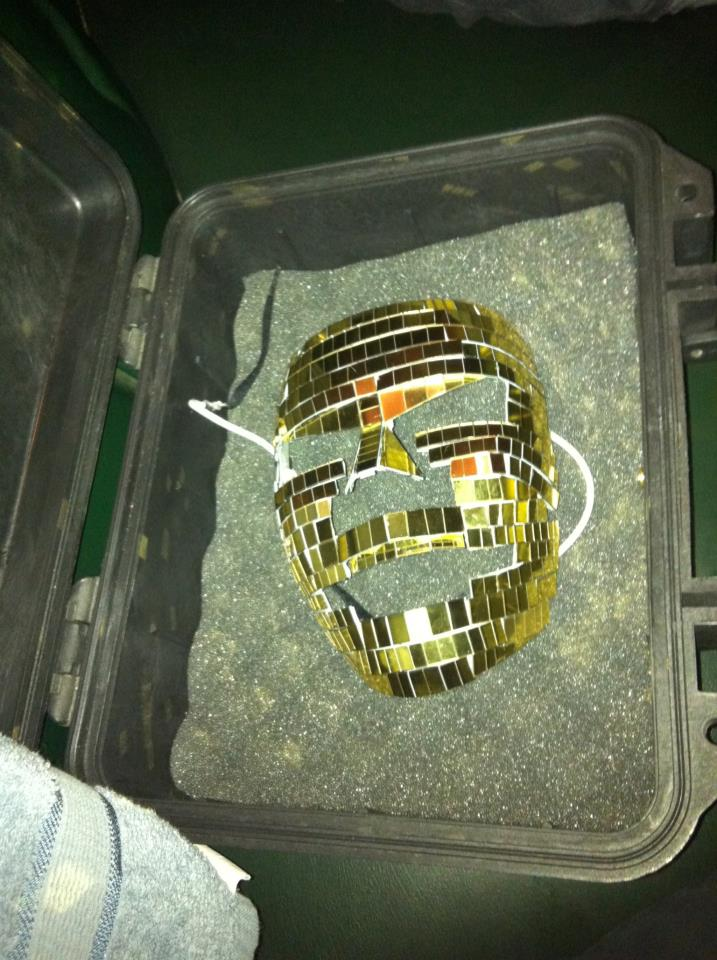
The "Public" mask before Chris Brown's "Look at Me Now" shoot

- Blake Lewis – Heartbreak on Vinyl
  - "Left My Baby for You"
- Chris Brown – Graffiti
  - I.Y.A.
  - For Ur Love
  - "Chase Our Love"
  - Girlfriend Feat. Lupe Fiasco
  - "They Say"
- Chris Brown – F.A.M.E.
  - "Bomb Feat. Wiz Khalifa"
- Chris Brown – Fortune
  - Don't Wake Me Up
- Cheryl Cole – Messy Little Raindrops
  - "Raindrops"
  - "Waiting"
- David Tort
  - Back On Ground
    - Getting Heavy
- Dizzee Rascal – The Fifth
  - "I Don't Need a Reason"
  - ”Superman”
- DJ Sammy – Look For Love (Single)
  - "Look For Love"
- Gryffin – (Bye Bye)
  - "Bye Bye"
- Jax – Funny (EP)
  - "Funny"
- Kelis – Flesh Tone
  - "Home"
- N-Dubz – Love.Live.Life
  - "Love.Live.Life
  - "Morning Star"
- Public – "Thank U!!!" (single)
- Seal – (Unreleased)
  - "I Believe"
- Tan Weiwei – (3811)
  - "Xiao Juan"
- Z.Tao – Z.TAO
  - "Feel Awake"
