= Crazy Love (2014 film) =

- Directed by: Cong Yi
- Production companies: TianJin Coastal New Area HuanYu Film And TV Media Co, LTD
- Release date: November 28, 2014
- Running time: 96 minutes
- Country: China
- Language: Mandarin
- Box office: ¥0.54 million (China)

Crazy Love (Chinese: 爱情狂想曲, Ai Qing Kuang Xiang Qu) is a 2014 Chinese romantic comedy film directed by Cong Yi. It was released on November 28, 2014.

== Cast ==
- Lee Wei
- Su Xiaomei
- Tong Yixuan
- Fu Man
- Qin Hanlei
- Cui Wenlu
- Yu Jinlong

== Reception ==
=== Box office ===
By December 8, 2014, the film had earned ¥0.54 million at the Chinese box office.
