= Closed Doors Village =

- Directed by: Xing Bo
- Starring: David Chen; Xu Dongdong; Bao Tino; Wang Liang
- Release date: May 27, 2014
- Running time: 86 minutes
- Country: China
- Language: Mandarin
- Box office: US$0.51 million

Closed Doors Village (Chinese: 封门村) is a 2014 Chinese suspense horror thriller mystery film directed by Xing Bo.

== Cast ==
- David Chen
- Xu Dongdong
- Bao Tino
- Wang Liang

== Reception ==
The film has grossed US$0.51 million at the Chinese box office.
