= David Chen =

Taiwanese actor (born 1979)

- 陳亦飛
- Born: 29 January 1979 (age 47); Taiwan
- Other names: Chen Yifei, Chen Yufan
- Education: University of California, Irvine
- Occupations: Actor, singer
- Years active: 2002–present
- Spouse: Tan Weiwei (m. 2017)

David Chen (born 29 January 1979), also known as Chen Yifei (Chinese: 陳亦飛; pinyin: Chén yìfēi) and Chen Yufan (Chinese: 陳宇凡; pinyin: Chén yǔfán) is a Taiwanese actor.

== Personal life ==
He married Chinese singer Tan Weiwei after proposing to her in 2016 during a trip to Mount Kailash. In 2018, they collaborated on a song for the TV series The Legend of Jade Sword which he acted in.

== Filmography ==
=== Film ===
Year	English title	Chinese title	Role	Notes
2004	West Town Girls	終極西門	Lee Chun Kwon	
2007	Immigrant Heaven	移民天堂	Su Zhigang	
2014	Closed Doors Village	封門村	Hu Donghai	
2015	Fly to the Venus	星语心愿之再爱	Yuhao	
2015	Fruit Rockers	摇滚水果	Brother Zhen	
2019	UglyDolls	醜い人形	Additional Voices	

=== Television ===
Year	English title	Chinese title	Role	Notes
2002	My MVP Valentine	MVP情人	Ming An (Iceman)	
2002	Star	摘星	He Yunhan	
2002	Beautiful Life	美麗人生		
2003	Go on the Stage	舞動奇蹟	Li Xiang	
2004	My Secret Garden 2	我的秘密花園2	Ding Jianyu	
2004	Nine-Ball	撞球小子	Yuri	Sang two songs for the original soundtrack
2005	A Story of Soldiers	再見，忠貞二村	Huang Jinsheng	
2005	Green Forest, My Home	綠光森林	Brian Shang	
2005	Only You	我只在乎你	Lei Ming	
2005	Taipei Family	住左邊住右邊	Tai Jidian	
2007	Come On! Girl	加油！晓惠	Zhao Kang	
2007	Wonderful Coffee	兩個門牌一個家	Wan Quan	
2007	Heaven Decides Fortunes	富贵在天	Tong Fugui	
2008	Jianghu.com	江湖.com	Hu Pai	
2008	I Do?	幸福的抉擇	Tan Yaozong	
2008	Big Pearl	大珍珠	Bai Yongyuan	
2008	Honey & Clover	蜂蜜幸運草	Tang Yefeng	
2009	Wife	家后	Zhao Danian	Sang the ending theme song with Jill Hsu
2009	The Concerto	協奏曲	Zuo Yafu	Sang the ending theme song with Jozie Lu
2009	Lotus Rain	莲花雨	Bartender	
2011	July Restaurant	七月餐厅	Ouyang Chen	
2011	Material Queen	拜金女王	Brother Sharp	
2012	In Between	半熟戀人	Zeng Xiaowei	
2012	Absolute Boyfriend	絕對達令	Shi Lun	
2012	Kids from East Gate	東門四少	Zhu Shaochuan	
2013	Love is not Blind	失恋33天	Wei Yiran	
2014	Love Café	深爱食堂	Mr. Qiao	
2014	The Legend of a Hongan General	鐵血紅安	Lin Xiaoshan	
2015	Little Beast Flower Shop	小野兽花店		
2015	The Second-Child Era	二胎时代	Han Ding	
2016	Hello, Joann	你好乔安	Lu Yuanyang	
2018	The Legend of Jade Sword	莽荒紀	Ji Nong	Sang the ending theme song with Tan Weiwei
2019	The Brightest Star in the Sky	夜空中最闪亮的星	Chen Tianhao	
