= Bachelors' Love =

- Film poster
- Traditional Chinese: 光的棍
- Simplified Chinese: 光的棍
- Hanyu Pinyin: Guāng Dě Gùn
- Directed by: Liu Cunming
- Written by: Cai Dongliang
- Produced by: Zhang Tiansheng; Wang Min
- Starring: Jill Hsu; Chen Hao; Zhou Zhi
- Cinematography: Jiang Xiaohui; Sun Wu
- Production companies: Beijing Runsheng Jiahe Culture Media Co., Ltd.
- Distributed by: Beijing Huaying Kongjian Culture Investment Co., Ltd.
- Release date: 8 November 2013
- Running time: 100 minutes
- Country: China
- Language: Mandarin

Bachelors' Love is a 2013 Chinese romantic comedy film directed by Liu Cunming and written by Cai Dongliang. The film stars Jill Hsu, Chen Hao, and Zhou Zhi. It was released in China on November 8, 2015.

== Cast ==
- Jill Hsu as Ka Xiaorou, a female film producer.
- Chen Hao as Yao Butong, a writer who suffers from acrophobia.
- Zhou Zhi as Xin Xiaoran

=== Other ===
- Michele Wang as Lin Xiaoyu
- Kong Ergou as Lang Youcai
- Mao Junjie as Zhi Xiaoya
- Daniella Wang as Mo Xiaomo
- Xie Wenxuan as Yun Xiaoxue

== Production ==
Principal photography started on June 10, 2013, in Tangshan, Hebei.

== Release ==
The crew hold a press conference at the Hundred Flowers Awards in Wuhan, capital of central China's Hubei province, on September 27, 2013, they announced that the film' theatrical release will be on November 11, during the Singles Day.

The film was released on November 8, 2015.

The film received mainly positive reviews.
