= Yang Shaohua =

Chinese comedian and actor (1932–2025)

- 杨少华
- Shaohua c. 2014
- Born: 17 June 1931; Beijing, China
- Died: 9 July 2025 (aged 94)
- Occupations: Comedian, actor
- Years active: 1944–2025
- Television: Yang Guang's Happy Life
- Spouse: Ouyang Sufen
- Children: 5

Yang Shaohua (simplified Chinese: 杨少华; traditional Chinese: 楊少華; pinyin: Yáng Shàohuá; 17 June 1931 – 9 July 2025) was a Chinese xiangsheng comedian and actor.

== Early life and career ==
Yang was born in Beijing, China in June 1931. His father died before he was born and his mother died in 1967. In 1944, he became a disciple of Guo Rongqi (Chinese: 郭荣起), and began performing xiangsheng at Beijing Qiming Tea Club. After the establishment of the Communist State in 1951, he moved to Tianjin and worked at Daming Iron and Steel Factory. After the Cultural Revolution, he was transferred to Tianjin Opera Group. He began performing xiangsheng with Ma Zhiming (Chinese: 马志明), a renowned xiangsheng comedian, in 1970s. In 2018, Yang had appeared in the CCTV New Year's Gala show.

== Personal life and death ==
Yang married Ouyang Sufen (Chinese: 欧阳素芬). The couple had five children, in order of birth: Yang Wei (Chinese: 杨威), Yang Jinming (Chinese: 杨进明), Yang Lun (Chinese: 杨伦), Yang Jian (Chinese: 杨健) and Yang Yi (Chinese: 杨议).

Yang died on 9 July 2025, at the age of 94.

== Filmography ==
=== Film ===
Year	English title	Chinese title	Role	Notes
2013	Yang Guang's Happy Life	杨光的快乐生活	Yang Fengnian	

=== Television ===
Year	English title	Chinese title	Role	Notes
2003	—N/a	笑口常开		
2004	Yang Guang's Happy Life	杨光的快乐生活	Yang Fengnian	
2006	Yang Guang's Happy Life 2	杨光的快乐生活2	Yang Fengnian	
2007	Yang Guang's Happy Life 3	杨光的快乐生活3	Yang Fengnian	
2007	Yang Guang's Happy Life 4	杨光的快乐生活4	Yang Fengnian	
2009	Yang Guang's Happy Life 5	杨光的快乐生活5	Yang Fengnian	
2009	Yang Guang's Happy Life 6	杨光的快乐生活6	Yang Fengnian	
2010	Yang Guang's New Life	杨光的新生活	Yang Fengnian	
2011	Yang Guang's Love Story	杨光的爱情故事	Yang Fengnian	
2013	—N/a	樱桃红		
2013	Yang Guang's Summer	杨光的夏天	Yang Fengnian	
