= Chinese Wine =

- Poster
- Traditional Chinese: 國酒
- Simplified Chinese: 国酒
- Hanyu Pinyin: Guójiǚ
- Directed by: Song Jiangbo
- Written by: Wang Qingwei
- Produced by: Li Tao; Lu Xiaohui
- Starring: Huang Yi; Van Fan; Winston Chao; Hou Tianlai; Shi Zhaoqi; Terence Yin
- Cinematography: Jiang Lijun
- Music by: Shu Nan
- Production companies: Kweichow Moutai Co., Ltd. Xiaoxiang Film Group Co., Ltd.
- Distributed by: Huaxia Film Distribution; China Film Promotion International
- Release date: 15 January 2016
- Running time: 90 minutes
- Country: China
- Language: Mandarin
- Box office: CN¥10.2 million (China)

Chinese Wine is a 2016 Chinese historical romance drama film directed by Song Jiangbo and stars Huang Yi, Van Fan, Winston Chao, Hou Tianlai, Shi Zhaoqi, and Terence Yin. It was released in China on January 15, 2016.

== Plot ==
After winning the award at the Panama–Pacific International Exposition in the United States in 1915, the small town of Maotai, which became famous for its wine, also became a historical stage that reflected the vicissitudes of the times. The opening of Wentong Bookstore connected the cultural context with the fragrance of wine, and the judgment of the gold medal competition allowed the two companies to share it together. The Cao and Cheng distilleries, representatives of the Maotai liquor industry, staged separations and reunions in troubled times. The Red Army crossed the Chishui River three times through Maotai, stirring up the blood of youth. Maotai liquor was also present at the Chongqing negotiations to witness the victory of the Anti-Japanese War. Huairen, the eldest son of the Cao family with a mysterious life experience, endured humiliation and became a generation of winemaking masters. The Maotai people who respect their roots and uphold the principles were also fortunate to have Maotai liquor become the exclusive liquor for the first banquet of the founding of New China on October 1, 1949.

== Cast ==
- Van Fan as Cao Huairen, the winemaker of Kweichow Moutai.
  - Gu Wenze as young Cao Huairen.
- Huang Yi as Cheng Yuping, Cao's wife, a female winemaker who loves Cao's brother, Cao Huaiyuan, a twist of fate, she was married to Cao Huairen.
- Hou Tianlai as Cao Jinghu, Cao's father.
- Shi Zhaoqi as Cheng Zijing, Cheng Yuping's father.
- Zheng Weili as Cheng's wife
- Terence Yin as Cheng Yufeng
- Wang Zicheng as Cheng Huaiyuan
- Xu Dongdong as Shi Ying, a female Red Army soldier.
- Winston Chao as Businessman Hua.

== Production ==
This film was shot in Yunnan, Guizhou, and Chongqing.

On December 15, 2015, the Kweichow Moutai Co., Ltd. announced that the film was scheduled for release on January 15, 2016.

== Release ==
The film was released on January 15, 2016, in China.

== Box office ==
The film's opening day gross was ¥1.327 million, by the weekend, the film's accumulated grossed reached ¥3.85 million. It grossed a total of CN¥10.214 million in China.
