= Wang Jianguo =

Chinese politician

- 王建国

Mayor of Xiaoyi
- In office August 2013 – December 2014
- Succeeded by: Wang Tinghong

Personal details
- Born: October 1965 (age 60–61) Lishi District, Lüliang, Shanxi, China
- Party: Chinese Communist Party (1988–2015; expelled)
- Education: Shanxi University

Chinese name
- Traditional Chinese: 王建國
- Simplified Chinese: 王建国
Transcriptions
Standard Mandarin
- Hanyu Pinyin: Wāng Jiànguó

Wang Jianguo (born October 1965) is a former Chinese politician who spent most of his career in north China's Shanxi province. As of December 2014 he was under investigation by the Communist Party's anti-corruption agency. Previously he served as the mayor of Xiaoyi.

== Life and career ==
Wang was born and raised in Lishi District of Lüliang, Shanxi. He entered Shanxi University in August 1981, majoring in Chinese language and literature, where he graduated in July 1985.

On leaving university in August 1985, he began his political career when he was assigned to Lüliang as an officer. He joined the Chinese Communist Party in November 1988. He spent 17 years working in there before serving as the head of Organization Department of Liulin County Party Committee and a Standing Committee of the County Committee.

In November 2009, he was promoted to become the Deputy Communist Party Secretary and County Governor of Zhongyang County, he remained in that position until July 2013, when he was transferred to Xiaoyi, a county-level city under the administration of Lüliang prefecture-level city, and appointed the vice-mayor and acting mayor. On August 8, 2013, he was elected mayor of Xiaoyi.

== Downfall ==
On December 3, 2014, the state media reported that he was being investigated by the Central Commission for Discipline Inspection of the Chinese Communist Party for "serious violations of laws and regulations".

He was detained on March 17, 2015. On August 10, he was expelled from the Chinese Communist Party (CCP) and dismissed from public office. On October 13, he was indicted on suspicion of accepting bribes.

On November 3, 2016, he was sentenced to 11 years and fined 600,000 yuan for taking bribes of more than 5.3 million yuan ($819,380) and $70000.

Government offices
Preceded by ?	Mayor of Xiaoyi; 2013–2014	Succeeded by Wang Tinghong
