= Zhang Haoran =

Chinese association football player

Personal information
- Date of birth: 6 February 1997 (age 29)
- Height: 1.75 m (5 ft 9 in)
- Position: Midfielder

Team information
- Current team: Wuhan Zall
- Number: 14

Senior career*
Years	Team	Apps	(Gls)
2019–	Wuhan Zall	6	(0)
- * Club domestic league appearances and goals as of 14:01, 31 December 2019 (UTC)

Zhang Haoran (simplified Chinese: 张浩然; traditional Chinese: 張浩然; pinyin: Zhāng Hàorán; born 6 February 1997) is a Chinese footballer currently playing as a midfielder for Wuhan Zall.

== Club career ==
Zhang Haoran would be promoted to the senior team of Wuhan Zall in the 2019 Chinese Super League campaign and he would go on to make his debut on 1 May 2019 in a Chinese FA Cup game against Shanghai SIPG F.C. that ended in a 3–1 defeat.

== Career statistics ==
As of 31 December 2019.

Club	Season	League			National Cup		Continental		Other		Total	
Club	Season	Division	Apps	Goals	Apps	Goals	Apps	Goals	Apps	Goals	Apps	Goals
Wuhan Zall	2019	Chinese Super League	6	0	1	0	–		–		7	0
Career total			6	0	1	0	0	0	0	0	7	0
