= Feifei Li =

Chinese computer scientist

Feifei Li is a database researcher at Alibaba Cloud, where he is a senior vice president in the Alibaba Cloud Intelligence Group. In 2021, he was named as an ACM Fellow, and as an IEEE Fellow. He received a bachelor's degree from Nanyang Technological University in 2002, and a Ph.D. from Boston University in 2007. His dissertation, Query and data security in the data outsourcing model, was supervised by George Kollios.
