= Fei-Fei Liu =

Canadian radiation oncologist and scientist

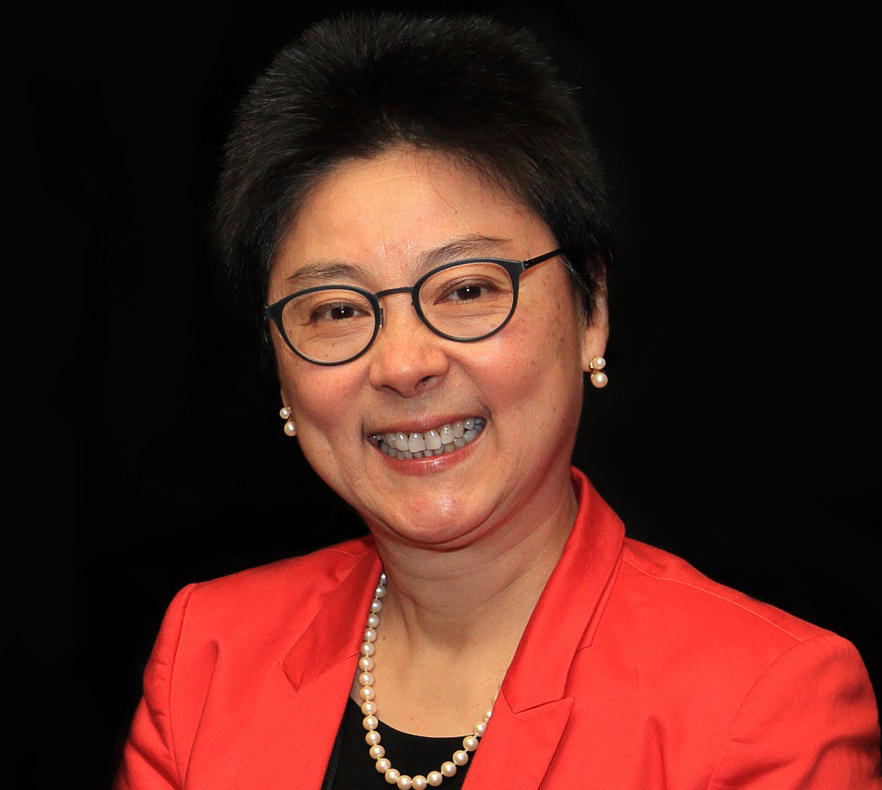
- Liu in 2022
- Citizenship: Canadian
- Education: Doctor of Medicine (MD)
- Alma mater: University of Toronto; Canadian Institutes of Health Research; Royal College of Physicians and Surgeons of Canada
- Scientific career
- Fields: Radiation oncology, breast cancer, head and neck cancers, molecular therapies
- Workplaces: Princess Margaret Cancer Centre; University of Toronto

Fei-Fei Liu FRCPC, FASTRO, FCAHS is a Canadian radiation oncologist and scientist at the Princess Margaret Cancer Centre. She is also a Professor in the Departments of Radiation Oncology, Medical Biophysics, and Otolaryngology within the Temerty Faculty of Medicine at the University of Toronto. Her research specializes breast, cervical, head and neck cancers, and cancer therapy.

Since 2022, she has served as the fourth Scientific Director of the Institute of Cancer Research at the Canadian Institutes of Health Research, Canada's federal funding agency for health research.

== Education ==
Liu graduated with a Doctor of Medicine (MD) from the University of Toronto in 1980. Following her MD, she earned certifications in Internal Medicine and Radiation Oncology from the Royal College of Physicians and Surgeons of Canada in 1984 and 1986, respectively. Liu has also completed a fellowship in hyperthermia research at Stanford University Medical Centre.

== Research and career ==
Following completion of her medical training, Liu joined the Princess Margaret Cancer Centre as a staff Radiation oncologist. Her research laboratory, the Liu Laboratory, opened in 1989 at the Princess Margaret Cancer Centre. Liu's research primarily focuses on translational molecular oncology for head and neck cancers, cervical cancer, breast cancer, soft-tissue sarcomas and nasopharyngeal carcinomas.

Her lab works on identifying and developing biomarkers as well as genomic profiling to determine the prognoses and treatment response of human cancers. Liu's lab was the first in Canada to document the role of human papilloma virus (HPV) in oropharyngeal carcinoma, leading to the rapid implementation of p16 immunohistochemistry for patients with oropharyngeal carcinoma in the province of Ontario. Her laboratory also determined early on that post-menopausal women with node-negative luminal A breast cancer subtype who were receiving hormonal therapy did not benefit from local breast radiotherapy, introducing the concept of personalized breast cancer radiotherapy. Liu has filed three patents related to her work over the years. More recently, the Liu lab has been focused on cancer survivorship research, specifically understanding mechanisms underlying late tissue toxicities related to cancer treatments such as radiation fibrosis and lymphedema. Liu's lab was amongst the first to describe the role of metabolic dysregulation, specifically downregulation of PPAR-signaling and fatty acid oxidation, as a key pathway underpinning the development of radiation fibrosis.

From 2012 to 2022, Liu served as the Chief of the Radiation Medicine Program at the Princess Margaret Cancer Centre, Head of the Department of Radiation Oncology at the University Health Network and Chair of the Department of Radiation Oncology at the University of Toronto. She founded the Strategic Training in Transdisciplinary Radiation Science in the 21st Century (STARS21) initiative in 2003, a capacity-building program focused on training upcoming scientists and clinicians in radiation medicine at the University of Toronto. The STARS21 program is the successor of the Excellence in Radiation Research for the 21st Century Program (EIRR21), and continues today as a flagship trans-disciplinary research training program for the next generation of radiation medicine scientists.

She currently serves as the fourth Scientific Director of the Institute of Cancer Research at the Canadian Institutes of Health Research.

== Honors and awards ==
- Mentorship Award, American Society for Radiation Oncology (2023)
- Fellow, Canadian Academy of Health Sciences (2022)
- Fellow, American Society for Radiation Oncology (2019)
- Mel Silverman Mentorship Award, University of Toronto (2019)
- Peter and Shelagh Godsoe Chair in Radiation Medicine, University Health Network (2019)
