= Scarlett Wang =

Chinese actress

- 王伊瑤
- Born: Wang Yiyao; June 30, 1991 (age 35); Jiagedaqi District, Daxing'anling Prefecture, Heilongjiang, China
- Other names: Vanessa Wang; Wang Miao; Wang Zhixuan
- Education: Qiqihar University
- Occupations: Actress; model
- Years active: 2013–present
- Modeling information
- Height: 170 cm (5 ft 7 in)
- Hair color: Black
- Eye color: Brown

Wang Yiyao
- Traditional Chinese: 王伊瑤
- Simplified Chinese: 王伊瑤
Transcriptions
Standard Mandarin
- Hanyu Pinyin: Wáng Yīyáo
- Gwoyeu Romatzyh: Wang Iyau
- Wade–Giles: Wang^{2} I^{1}yao^{2}
- Tongyong Pinyin: Wang^{2} Yi^{1}yao^{2}
- Yale Romanization: Wang^{2} Yi^{1}yau^{2}
- IPA: [wǎŋ í.jǎʊ]
Yue: Cantonese
- Yale Romanization: Wòhng Yī-yìuh
- Jyutping: Wong^{4} Ji^{1}-jiu^{4}
- Sidney Lau: Wong^{4} Yi^{1}yiu^{4}
- Canton Romanization: Wong^{4} Yi^{1}yiu^{4}
- IPA: [wɔŋ ji˥.jiw]
Southern Min
- Hokkien POJ: Ông jī-jao

Wang Zhixuan
- Traditional Chinese: 王祉萱
- Simplified Chinese: 王祉萱
Transcriptions
Standard Mandarin
- Hanyu Pinyin: Wáng Zhǐxuān
- Gwoyeu Romatzyh: Wang Jyyshiuan
- Wade–Giles: Wang^{2} Chih^{3}hsüan^{1}
- Tongyong Pinyin: Wang^{2} Jhih^{3}syuan^{1}
- Yale Romanization: Wang^{2} Jr^{3}sywan^{1}
- IPA: [wǎŋ ʈʂɻ̩̀.ɕɥɛ́n]
Yue: Cantonese
- Yale Romanization: Ông chí-hoan
- Jyutping: Wong^{4} Zi^{2}-hyun^{1}
- Sidney Lau: Wong^{4} Ji^{2}huen^{1}
- Canton Romanization: Wong^{4} Ji^{2}hün^{1}
- IPA: [wɔŋ ji˧.hyn]
Southern Min
- Hokkien POJ: Ông biáu

Wang Miao
- Traditional Chinese: 王淼
- Simplified Chinese: 王淼
Transcriptions
Standard Mandarin
- Hanyu Pinyin: Wáng Miǎo
- Gwoyeu Romatzyh: Wang Meau
- Wade–Giles: Wang^{2} Miao^{3}
- Tongyong Pinyin: Wang^{2} Miao^{3}
- Yale Romanization: Wang^{2} Myau^{3}
- IPA: [wǎŋ miàʊ]
Yue: Cantonese
- Yale Romanization: Wòhng Míuh
- Jyutping: Wong^{4} Miu^{5}
- Sidney Lau: Wong^{4} Miu^{5}
- Canton Romanization: Wong^{4} Miu^{5}
- IPA: [wɔŋ miwh]
Southern Min
- Hokkien POJ: Ông biáu

Wang Yiyao (Chinese: 王伊瑤, born 30 June 1991), also known as Scarlett Wang or Vanessa Wang, is a Chinese actress and model. Wang graduated from Qiqihar University.

== Career ==
=== Beginnings ===
In 2010, at the age of 19, Wang was discovered after being photographed while she was taking an art examination which led to her being dubbed "Little Kelly Chen" by netizens. In 2011, she made her modelling debut as a CVTV star angel and was chosen to promote the Volvo Ocean Race in China for two consecutive years (2011–2012).

Between 2011 and 2013, Wang made appearances in multiple Chinese variety shows including as a contestant on Super Star Ding Dong (开门大吉).

In 2013, Wang made her official acting debut in China's first 3D fantasy romance movie The Fox Lover. The same year, she appeared in the urban sitcom Happy Leftovers.

In 2014, Wang appeared in the campus comedy Super Teacher Bing adapted from the online novel of the same name, playing a bold, unrestrained, charming and innocent "beautiful bad girl". The drama garnered over 100 million views online during its broadcast period. The same year, Wang also appeared in the female critical ethics drama Youth Confession produced by Hunan TV and LeTV.

In 2015, Wang appeared in the Zanilia Zhao and Ryan Zheng-led workplace drama Best Get Going as the intern Gao Ruohan. The same year, she appeared in the idol drama My Love to Tell You. In September, Wang was cast alongside Elvis Han and Gülnezer Bextiyar in the fantasy romance television series Chinese Paladin 5, adapted from the popular role-playing game The Legend of Sword and Fairy 5 as the demoness Du Ying.

=== 2016–present: Rising popularity ===
In 2016, Wang appeared in the role of the ninth princess consort in the period romance drama Legend of Nine Tailed Fox. The same year, she played in the period romance drama Royal Highness which aired in 2018. In November, she was a guest at the inaugural OK!Funshion Week Celebrity Fashion Week. She then appeared in the anti-Japanese war drama The Battle of Jiangqiao portraying a Jiangmen-born patriotic and progressive young lady.

In 2017, Wang played a supporting role alongside Xia Yu, Yan Ni and Binlong Pan in the urban fantasy comedy movie Wished.

In 2019, Wang appeared in the youth cute pet emotional drama Hero Dog 3 alongside Jiang Chao and Cecilia Boey as a gentle female vet. In July, Wang appeared in the fashion drama The Next Top Star which starred Qu Ying and Xu Kaicheng as cold-looking Guan Tang who has a sense of justice.

In 2020, Wang was cast as Fang Yi, one of Wei Xiaobao's seven wives, in the latest television adaptation of Jin Yong's novel The Deer and the Cauldron.

In 2021, Wang co-starred with Wen Song and Jia Bing in her first republican drama as the female lead in web drama Legendary Hotel. Wang returned to the big screen in August in rom-com movie My Heroic Husband. In November, the 3rd China Online Film Week announced that Wang had won the Most Influential Actor Award. On 5 December, Wang appeared in suspense web drama Who Is The Murderer which starred Zanilia Zhao. The drama was released exclusively on iQIYI's Mist Theatre platform.

On 13 September 2022, Wang starred alongside Jordan Chan in the fantasy film See The Sea. The same year, Wang played a supporting role in period comedy drama New Life Begins.

In 2023, Wang took on a role in another suspense drama Who Is He jointly-produced by CCTV-8 and Youku. She then appeared in period romance drama The Longest Promise which premiered on 2 July and five days later on Netflix, marking Wang's first related work with the latter.

In 2024, Wang was cast in a supporting role in xianxia drama The Legend of Shen Li after being recommended to director Deng Ke by leading lady Zanilia Zhao. The drama was a hit domestically, leading to increased recognition for Wang. Later in August 2024, Wang made special appearances in novel-adapted period drama Go East.

== Filmography ==
=== Film ===
Year	English title	Chinese title	Role	Notes/Ref.
2013	The Fox Lover	白狐	Zi Jing	
2017	Wished	反轉人生	Kai Li	
2021	My Heroic Husband	赘婿之吉兴高照	Gao Tian	
2022	See The Sea	猎海日志	Liu Li	

=== Television series ===
Year	English title	Chinese title	Role	Network	Notes/Ref.
2014	Happy Leftovers	開心邊角料	Lu Yisi	Guangdong TV	
2014	Super Teacher Bing	超級教師	An Chunchun	LeTV	
2014	Youth Confession	青春忏悔录	Wang Wenjia	LeTV	
2015	Best Get Going	加油吧實習生	Gaowen Ruohan	Jiangsu TV	
2016	My Love to Tell You	我的愛對你說	Pei Yun	Guangdong TV, Hubei TV	
2016	Legend of Nine Tailed Fox	青丘狐傳說	Ninth Princess Consort	Hunan TV	
2016	Chinese Paladin 5	仙劍雲之凡	Du Ying	Hunan TV	
2016	Battle of Jiangqiao	决战江桥	Hai Lan	Tianjin TV, Heilongjiang TV	
2018	Royal Highness	回到明朝當王爺之楊凌傳	Yin Qi	Youku	
2019	Hero Dog 3	神犬小七3	Zhou Mo	iQiyi, Tencent Video	
2019	The Next Top Star	熱搜女王	Guan Tang	Sohu Video	
2020	The Deer and the Cauldron	鹿鼎記	Fang Yi	CCTV, iQiyi, Youku	
2021	Legendary Hotel	奉天大饭店	Ma Hulu		
2021	Who Is The Murderer	谁是凶手	Zhou Xiaoyun	iQiyi	
2022	Rose War	玫瑰之战	Chen Xian	CCTV, iQiyi, Tencent Video	
2022	New Life Begins	青川日常	Bai Lu	iQiyi	
2023	Who Is He	他是谁	Bao Li	CCTV, Youku	
2023	The Longest Promise	玉骨遥	Ru Yi	Tencent Video, Netflix	
2024	The Legend of Shen Li	与凤行	Jin Niang Zi	Hunan TV, Tencent Video, Mango TV	
2024	Go East	四方馆	Hua Xiao Niang	iQiyi	
2024	Guardians of the Dafeng	大奉打更人	Li Miaozhen	Tencent Video	
TBA	The Golden Hairpin	青簪行	Lu Dicui	Hunan TV, Tencent Video	

=== Short film ===
Year	English title	Chinese title	Role	Notes/Ref.
2011	A Different Angle	不一样的角度	Female classmate	

== Awards and nominations ==
Year	Award	Category	Nominated work	Result	Ref.
Other awards
2021	China Online Film Week	Most Influential Actor Award	My Heroic Husband	Won	
