= Yang Lei =

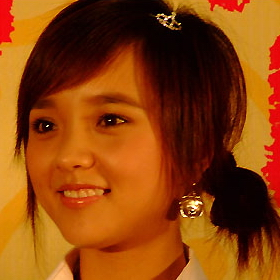
- Born: October 12, 1984 (age 40); Chongqing, China
- Occupation: Singer
- Years active: 2006–present
- Awards: Super Girl; 2006 the Tenth
- Musical career
- Also known as: Shinee Lee.
- Origin: Chongqing, China
- Genres: Mandopop
- Labels: Taihe Rye Music
- Website: www.520yanglei.com

Yang Lei (simplified Chinese: 阳蕾; traditional Chinese: 陽蕾; pinyin: Yáng Lěi; born October 12, 1984, in Chongqing), also known as Shinee Lee, is a Chinese pop singer and actress who achieved instant fame when she won the nationwide singing contest Super Girl in 2006.

== Early years ==
Born into a middle-class family, Yang Lei was not encouraged to pursue a career in entertainment. Before 2006, she was a music teacher at the Heping primary school.

== Super Girl competition ==
While still a 22-year-old teacher at the Heping primary school, Yang participated in the Super Girl singing contest (similar to the Idol series of contests around the world) in 2006. She won the qualifying competition in Chengdu, then went on to win the nationwide contest among 80,000 applicants. Subsequently, she won the tenth in the nationwide contest.

== Music career ==
Her first single was "Learn" (学会), recorded during the time when she was on Super Girl. Her second single was "1234 Dance" (1234舞). Her third single was "Love me, don't be troublesome" (爱我不罗嗦), which is an interlude of the TV play named "He Was Cool" (那小子真帅). Her fourth single was "Love and Bravery" (爱，勇气).

Her debut album, titled The Panda is coming (熊猫来了), was released on May 5, 2009. It presold 10,000 copies and sold more than 4,000 copies in the first month.

== Acting career ==
Her first TV play was "He Was Cool" (那小子真帅), in which she played the leading lady named "Han Qiansui" (韩千穗). Her second TV play was "Diary of the Boys" (男生日记), in which she played the leading lady named "Mo Xiner" (莫欣儿).

== Discography ==
=== Albums ===
Information	Track listing
The Panda is coming (熊猫来了): Released: May 5, 2009; 1st Studio Album	1. 熊猫来了 [The Panda is coming]; 2. 运动宝贝 [Sports Baby]; 3. 戒不掉 [Can't give up]

=== Singles ===
- 2006 "Learn" (学会)
- 2007 "1234 Dance" (Chinese:1234舞)
- 2007 "Love me, don't be troublesome" (爱我不罗嗦)
- 2008 "Love and Bravery" (爱，勇气)

=== TV plays ===
- 2007 "He Was Cool" (那小子真帅)
- 2008 "Diary of the boys" (男生日记)
