= Winnie Zhong =

African Chinese model and entertainer (born 1996)

- 仲菲菲
- Born: May 12, 1996 (age 29); Guangzhou, Guangdong, China
- Years active: 2019–present

Winnie Zhong

Zhong Feifei
- Traditional Chinese: 仲菲菲
- Simplified Chinese: 仲菲菲
Transcriptions
Standard Mandarin
- Hanyu Pinyin: Zhòng Fēifēi
- Wade–Giles: Chùng Fēifēi
- IPA: ʈʂʊŋ feɪ feɪ

Winnie Zhong, also known by her Chinese name Zhong Feifei, is a model and musician of mixed Congolese and Chinese descent. She first garnered attention from both Chinese and international audiences when she starred on the Chinese competition show Produce Camp 2020. She is also the first multiracial person of Afro-Asian origins to model for Vogue China.

== Early life ==
Winnie Zhong was born Zhong Feifei on May 12, 1996, in Guangzhou, Guangdong Province, China to a Chinese mother and Congolese father.
