= Tan Weiwei =

Chinese singer (born 1982)

- 谭维维
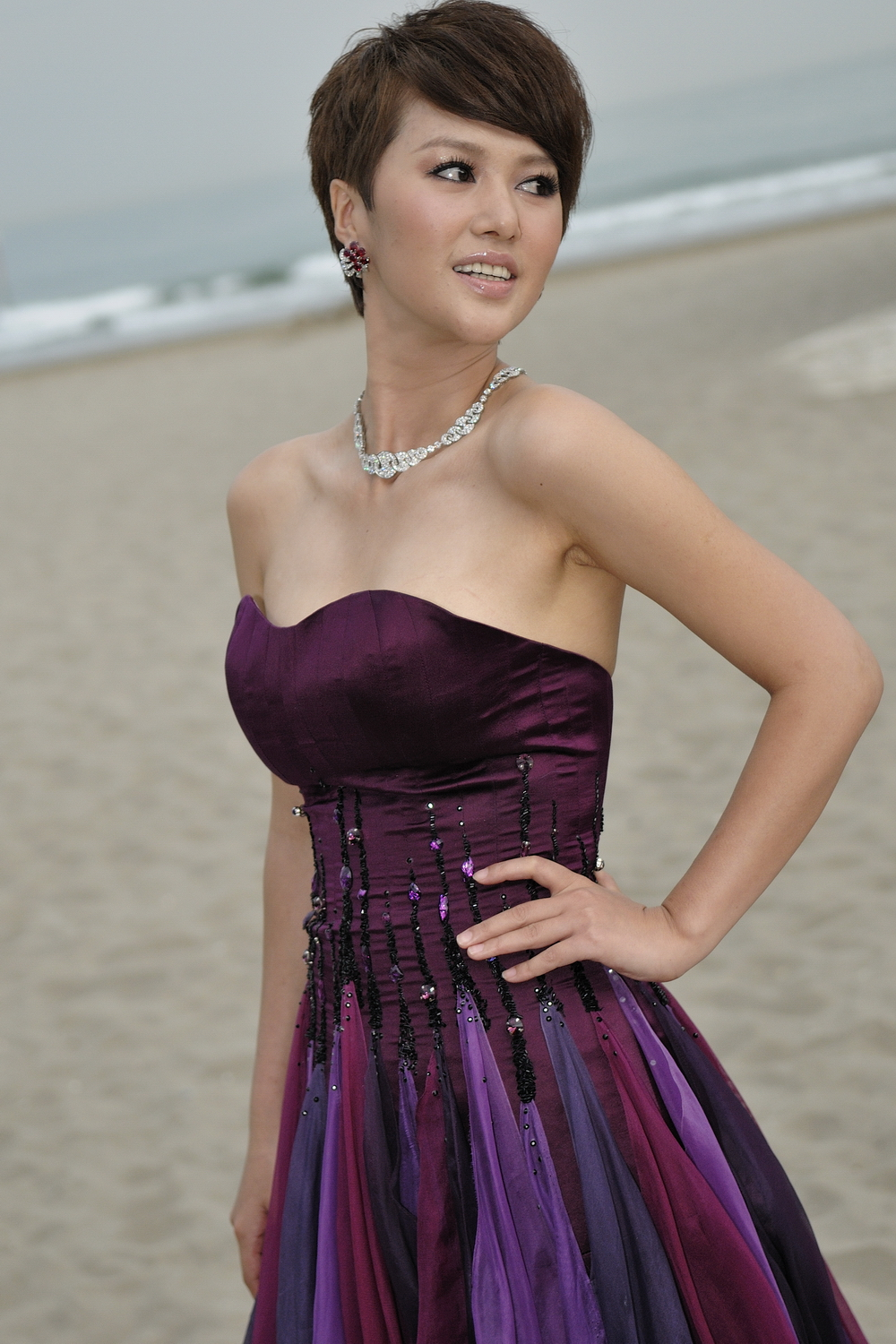
- Tan Weiwei at the 2009 Venice Film Festival
- Born: 8 October 1982 (age 43); Fushun County, Zigong, Sichuan, China
- Other name: Sitar Tan
- Education: Sichuan Conservatory of Music
- Occupation: Singer
- Years active: 2006–present
- Agent: TH Entertainment
- Spouse: David Chen (m. 2017)
- Children: 2
- Musical career
- Genres: Mandopop, Rock, Folk
- Label: EE-Media

Chinese name
- Simplified Chinese: 谭维维
- Traditional Chinese: 譚維維
Transcriptions
Standard Mandarin
- Hanyu Pinyin: Tán Wéiwéi

Tan Weiwei (simplified Chinese: 谭维维; traditional Chinese: 譚維維; pinyin: Tán Wéiwéi; born 8 October 1982), also known as Sitar Tan, is a Chinese singer and actress.

She was the runner-up of the third season (2006) of Super Girl (Chinese: 超级女声), a singing contest in China. In 2015, she participated I Am a Singer (season 3), where it was revealed that she is a vegan.

== Early life ==
Tan Weiwei was born in Fushun County, Zigong, Sichuan, on 8 October 1982. Her mother was a teacher and her father worked at a cultural station. She spent her childhood in Zigong with her parents. As a teenager, she became interested in pop music. In 1997, she won first places in the Students Art Festivals in both her primary and secondary schools. At the end of 1998, she began to perform in bars. When she was 19, she entered the Sichuan Conservatory of Music, where many the biggest names of the mainland Chinese Mandopop singer had been trained. Although her marks were not very high, she managed to improve her vocal technique thanks to Lanka Dolma, a Chinese vocal trainer of Tibetan ethnicity, who discovered the hidden talent of the young singer. Thanks to Lanka Dolma, she learned many traditional singing techniques which nowadays, Tan uses in her recordings. And at the same year, she was honored as Top Ten singers of Sichuan province.

== Music career ==
In 2020 Tan Weiwei released her album '3811'. Since July, Tan Weiwei has been releasing new singles from her album "3811," with each of the 11 songs chronicling stories of women from diverse backgrounds, including a taxi-driving single mom, an illiterate elderly woman, and a female poet from the Tang dynasty. In December she released the song 'Xiao Juan'. "Erase our names, forget our beings, same tragedy continues and repeats," Tan sings. (Xiao Juan is a name, like Jane Doe in English, that is used to anonymize women's names in court cases.) The groundbreaking song, which went viral in China, refers to domestic violence and misogyny, citing recent violent deaths of real women in China.

== Personal life ==
She married Taiwanese actor David Chen after he proposed in 2016 during a trip to Mount Kailash. In 2018, they collaborated on a song for the TV series The Legend of Jade Sword (莽荒紀) which he acted in.

== Discography ==
=== Studio albums ===
#	Album name	Type	Label(s)	Released Date	Tracklisting
1st	高原之心 Heart of the Highland	Studio Album	Star recording	2005-11-23	1. 高原之心 Heart of the Plateau; 2. 康定情歌與溜溜調 Kangding Qingge; 3. 神鷹傳說 Legend of the Condor; 4. 走進西藏 Into Tibet; 5. 阿娃茲古麗 Avanz Guri; 6. 海市蜃樓 Mirage; 7. 永遠的那達慕 Nadam Forever; 8. 牧歌 Husbandry Song; 9. 烏蘭巴託之夜 The Night of Ulaanbaatar
2nd	耳界 Ear of the World	Studio Album	[www.eemedia.cn/ EE-Media]	2007-12-04	1. 蝶 Butterfly; 2. 鋼琴 Piano; 3. 做錯; 4. 不穿高跟鞋; 5. 視而不見; 6. 愛的光 Light of Love; 7. 達子的春天 Spring of Tatsuya; 8. 也許也許 Maybe; 9. 向日葵 Sunflower; 10. 雪落下的聲音 Sound of Snowing; 11. 傳說 Legend
3rd	傳說 Legend	Studio Album	Flamingo Records	2009-06-11	1. 蝴蝶的翅膀 Butterfly's Wings; 2. 阿爸 Dad; 3. 傳說 Legend; 4. 高原紅; 5. 我要和你去飛翔 I Want To Fly With You; 6. 洗衣歌 Laundry Song; 7. 夢中的唐古拉 Tangula In The Dream; 8. 獻給阿媽的歌 Song Dedicated To Mum; 9. 走進西藏 Into Tiabet; 10. 天路; 11. 夢中的綠洲 Oasis In The Dream; 12. 花的海洋 Ocean of Flower; 13. 四姑娘山下雪了嗎
4th	譚某某 Tan Mou Mou	Studio Album	[www.eemedia.cn/ EE-Media]	2010-03-20	1. Fight; 2. 如果有來生; 3. 如果你 If You; 4. 離去之前叫醒我 Wake Me Up Before You Go; 5. 譚某某 Tan Moumou; 6. 往日時光 The Past; 7. 石頭在歌唱 Stone Is Singing; 8. 匹諾曹 Pinocchio; 9. 悲哀而真實 Sad But Real
5th	3	Studio Album	遠達卓越	2011-10-18	1. 我是怎麼了 What's Wrong With Me; 2. 想見 Want To Meet; 3. Hold不住 Can't Hold; 4. 塵埃 Ashes; 5. 睡吧寶貝 Sleep, Baby; 6. 演 Act; 7. 艷陽天 Sunny Day; 8. 在那遙遠的地方 In That Faraway Place; 9. 我 I 10. 開放 Open
6th	烏龜的阿基里斯 Tortoise Called Achilles	Studio Album	遠達卓越	2013-10-23	1. 序 2. 擁抱 Embrace; 3. 玩耍 Play; 4. 惡之花 Evil Flower; 5. 樹 Tree; 6. 我反對 Against; 7. 什麼 What; 8. 牆 Wall; 9. 黑則明 Black/Bright; 10. 為什麼 Why; 11. 當 When; 12. 我愛你 I Love You; 13. 天堂口處蓮花開 Lotus Blossoms
7th	3811	Studio Album	遠達卓越	2020-12-11	#章存仙: 1. 章存仙; 2. 魏如萱 - 鱼玄机; 3. 阿果; 4. 吴春芳; 5. 如花; 6. 钱夫人; 7. 赵桂灵; 8. 卡利; 9. 小娟 (化名); 10. ཏཱ་རེ་མ།(Tare Ma); 11. 谭艳梅

Extended Plays:

- (2016) 夏長 Long Summer EP
- (2016) 秋收 Golden Harvest EP
- (2017) 春生 Season of Rebirth EP
- (2017) Winter EP
- (2020) 姐码3811 Sister Ma 3811 EP
- (2020) 姐放3811 Sister Fang 3811 EP

=== Singles ===
- "If I Haven’t Fell Into Love" (如果我没有爱过)(September 2006)
- "I forgot to say" (我忘了说) (January 2008)
- "Encounter" (遇见) (August 2010)
- "In the Shu river" (在束河里) (October 2010)
- "Bridge of Fate" (2016) with Leehom Wang

== Filmography ==
Film

- Chengdu, I Love You (2009)
- East Meets West 2011 (2011)
- Secret Garden (Chinese: 秘密花園; pinyin: Mìmì huāyuán, 2012)
- Forget All Remember (2014)
- Love Education (2017)

Variety shows

- Keep Running - Season 4 Episode 6 (guest)
