= Lee Wei =

Taiwanese actor and singer (born 1980)

- Born: Lee Yi-wei; 9 July 1980 (age 45); Taipei, Taiwan
- Other name: Li Wei
- Occupations: Actor, singer
- Years active: 2000–present

Chinese name
- Traditional Chinese: 李威
- Simplified Chinese: 李威
Transcriptions
Standard Mandarin
- Hanyu Pinyin: Lǐ Wēi
Southern Min
- Hokkien POJ: Lí Ui
- Musical career
- Origin: Taiwan
- Genres: Mandopop

Lee Wei (Chinese: 李威; Pe̍h-ōe-jī: Lí Ui; born 9 July 1980 as Li Yi-wei Chinese: 李翊玮; pinyin: Li Yiwei; Wade–Giles: Lee I-wei) is a Taiwanese actor and singer.

== Personal life ==
After retiring from the entertainment industry, Lee became a devout Buddhist. In February 2025, Lee was detained and named as a suspect in the murder of a woman named Tsai (蔡), Him and 13 other people were detained and named as a suspect as well. whose body was found in the meeting place of a Buddhist group in Daan District, Taipei in 2024. He was released after posting bail along with his wife, surnamed Chien.

== Filmography ==
=== Movies ===
Movies
Year	Title	Role	Film Production	Notes	With
2004	Blue Cha Cha	Hao	Green Light Film	Supporting Role	None
2006	Open to Midnight	Dong		Supporting Role	Eddie Peng
2013	Flash Play				
2013	The Chrysalis				
2013	Baby Run				
2013	Lost				
2013	Heaven Clock				
2014	Xue Cai				
2014	Midnight Hair				
2014	The Crossing				
2014	Crazy Love				
2015	The Buried Secret				
2015	The Crossing 2		China Film Group Corporation	Main Cast	None

=== Television ===
Television
Year	Chinese Title	English Title	Role	Network	Notes	With
2000	麻辣鮮師	Spicy Teacher	Lin Tong (林龍)	CTS	Main Cast	None
2001	吐司男之吻	Toast Boy's Kiss	Lee Wei (李威)	CTS	Lead Role	Li Kang Yi
2002	甜檸檬之戀	Sweet Lemon	Duan Mu	CTV	Lead Role	Liang You Lin
2002	愛情本事	Toast Boy's Kiss II: The Ability of Love	Lee Wei (李威)	CTS	Lead Role	Terri Kwan
2004	單身宿舍連環泡	Singles Dormitory	Han Zheng Tai	CTS	Lead Role	N/A
2004	極速傳説	The Legend of Speed	Xiao Feng/Ji Wu Feng	CTV	Lead Role	Rainie Yang
2004	求婚事務所	Say Yes Enterprise: The Graduate	Xiao Wu	TTV	Lead Role	Cecilia Yip
2005	惡靈05	Evil Spirit 05	Er Zi Liang	GTV	Lead Role	None
2006	车神	Fast Track Love	Huo Jun Cong	N/A	Main Cast	Ady An
2006	天堂來的孩子	The Kid from Heaven	Zhang Xing He (張星禾)	CTS	Lead Role	Chen Yi Rong
2007	放羊的星星	My Lucky Star	Han Zhi Yin (韓志胤)	TTV	Main Cast	None
2007	麻雀愛上鳳凰	Calling Love	Steven/Gao Feng (高峰)	CTS	Lead Role	Li Xiaolu
2008	鬥牛。要不要	Bull Fighting	Jin Zi Cong (金子聰)	TTV	Main Cast	None
2009	協奏曲	The Concerto	Feng Shang Ning (馮尚寧)	TTV	Lead Role	Esther Liu
2009	海派甜心	Hi My Sweetheart	He Yan Feng (何言風)	CTS	Main Cast	None
2010	聊斋3	Liao Zhai 3	Gan Fan (高蕃)/Lin Feng (林峰)	CTV	Lead Role	Jia Qing
2011	艋舺燿輝	Monga Yao Hui	Chen Yao Hui (陳燿輝)	CTS	Lead Role	None
2011	聖堂風雲	Sanctuary	Li Jie Yang (黎介揚)	TVBS	Lead Role	None
2012	小孩大人	Man Boy	Lin Zhen Sheng	PTS	Lead Role	Li Kang Yi
2013	千金归来	Daughter's Return	Jin Rui	Dragon TV	Lead Role	
2014	巷弄裡的那家書店	Lovestore in the Corner	Cheng Meng Zheng	CTS, TVBS	Lead Role	Nikki Tsieh, Alien Huang
2018	莽荒纪	Legend of the Jade Sword	Reverent Sloppy	Anhui TV	Lead Role	

== Discography ==
Discography
Year	Title	Notes
2004	Rain and Tears	Opening Song for Singles Dormitory
2006	Hei Ye Ming Tian (黑夜明天)	Opening Song for The Kid from Heaven
