= List of Chinese films of 2015 =

The following is a list of mainland Chinese films first released in year 2015.

== Box office ==
These are the top 10 grossing Chinese films that were released in China in 2015:

Highest-grossing domestic films of 2015 in China
Rank	Title	Domestic gross
1	Monster Hunt	$382,490,000
2	Mojin: The Lost Legend	$255,740,000
3	Lost in Hong Kong	$253,850,000
4	Goodbye Mr. Loser	$226,930,000
5	Jian Bing Man	$186,350,000
6	From Vegas to Macau II	$156,000,000
7	Monkey King: Hero Is Back	$152,950,000
8	Mr. Six	$136,890,000
9	Detective Chinatown	$126,740,000
10	Dragon Blade	$120,000,000

== Films released ==
=== January–March ===
Opening		Title	Director	Cast	Genre	Notes	Ref.
J A N U A R Y	1	Bicycle Boy	Liu Kexin	Tang Xiaoxi, Zhang Xueling, Lu Zhixing	Animation / Fantasy / Adventure		
J A N U A R Y	1	Brave Rabbit 2 Crazy Circus	Zeng Xianlin	Xiao Liansha, Ding Dang, Hao Xianghai, Wang Xing, Wang Qi, Zhu Rongrong	Comedy / Animation / Children / Adventure		
J A N U A R Y	8	20 Once Again	Leste Chen	Yang Zishan, Gua Ah-leh, Chen Bolin, Lu Han, Wang Deshun, Zhao Lixin, Li Yijuan, Yin Hang	Comedy / Romance / Fantasy	Mainland-South Korea-Taiwan-Hong Kong co-production	
J A N U A R Y	9	The Lead Singer and Dancer and His Woman	Niu Jianrong	Chu Shuanzhong, Ding Liuyuan, Peng Jing	Drama / Romance		
J A N U A R Y	16	Lotus Code	Frank Zhu	Lu Nuo, Pan Yang, Gao Liwen, Chen Yuemo, Batu Ying, Hou Di, Li Dahai, Frank Zhu, Zhu Shimao, Chen Peisi	Drama / Mystery		
J A N U A R Y	16	The Unbearable Lightness of Inspector Fan	Clara Law	Ethan Juan, Zhou Dongyu, Yang Zishan, Yang Yang, Jack Kao, Zhao Lixin, Jin Song, Zhang Jingjing, Liu Yiwei, Du Haitao, Guo Qiucheng	Comedy / Action / Romance / Suspense	Mainland-Hong Kong co-production	
J A N U A R Y	16	Who's the One	Chen Tong	Xu Shendong, Zhang Huixin, Qu Yutong, Wang Letian, Wang Yan, Yan Meiyi, Chen Tong, Li Fei	Comedy / Romance		
J A N U A R Y	23	Déjà Vu	Huang Wei	Liu Yang, Jampa Tseten, Xia Yan	Comedy		
J A N U A R Y	23	Money Game	Wang Wei	Lee Seung-hyun, Zhang Lanxin, Liu Hua, Hu Xia, Zhang Yishan, Bao Jianfeng, Cao Yunjin, Li Chengfeng, Xie Jinyuyin, Mimi Chu, KK Cheung, Crystal Zhang, Zhang Dali, Guan Ling	Comedy		
J A N U A R Y	23	Tales of Mystery	Raymond Yip, Tian Meng, Xian Xuchu	Aarif Rahman, Janice Man, Zhu Zhu, Law Lan, Oscar Leung, Shi Yanfei, Feng Wenjuan, Yolanda Yang, Huang Ming, Michelle Hu, Lu Yulai, Lin Jiangguo	Thriller		
J A N U A R Y	23	Taste of China	Huang Yinghao, Zhang Wei, Wang Bing, Jin Ying	Yang Zhenhua, Chen Hanzong, Chen Junfan, Mao Xiejun, You Qiang	Documentary		
J A N U A R Y	27	Onion From the Boot of a Benz	Guo Minger	Zhou Dehua, Han Xuewei, Dong Lifan, Yu Fei, Lu Yang, Wang Hao, Bili Getu, Wang Zhengquan, Tang Dagang, Wang Peilu	Comedy		
J A N U A R Y	29	Hot Blood Band	Zha Muchun	Chen Xiang, Ying Da, Leon Dai, Anthony Wong, Annie Zhou, Kathy Chow, Cai Ming, Liu Yiwei	Comedy		
J A N U A R Y	30	Boonie Bears: Mystical Winter	Ding Liang, Liu Fuyuan	Zhang Wei, Zhang Bingjun, Tan Xiao, Meng Yutian, Sun Yaodong, Zhao Xiaoyu, Xin Yuan, Wan Danqing	Comedy / Animation / Family / Adventure		
J A N U A R Y	30	On Line	Li Changxin	Liu Mengmeng, Kang Enhe, Li Ning, Zhang Weixun, Luo Guangmin, Tong Yang, Du Yifei	Action / Sci-fi		
J A N U A R Y	30	Running Man	Hu Jia, Cen Junyi	Angelababy, Wang Baoqiang, Li Chen, Michael Chen, Zheng Kai, Wong Cho-lam, Xie Yilin, Lynn Hung, Guo Jingfei, Yi Yi, Kim Jong-kook	Comedy / Reality show		
J A N U A R Y	31	Baby, Sorry	Pan Liping, Du Lin, Liu Ke, Li Rui, Wang Jun	Wang Yan, Wang Hongqin, Steve Ma, Ma Shitian, Shao Bing, Shao Zijiao, Shao Ziheng, Bin Bin, Xiao Xiao-bin	Family / Reality show		
J A N U A R Y	31	Pleasant Goat and Big Big Wolf – Amazing Pleasant Goat	Huang Weiming	Zu Qing, Zhang Lin, YYY, Gao Quansheng, Liang Ying, Deng Yuting, Liu Hongyun, Zhao Na	Comedy / Animation / Family / Fantasy / Adventure		
F E B R U A R Y	5	Legend of the Moles – The Magic Train Adventure	Li Tingting	Yang Ou, Xia Lei, Xie Tiantian, Feng Junhua, Cu Cu, Shen Dawei, Fan Junhang	Animation / Family / Adventure		
F E B R U A R Y	6	Crazy New Year’s Eve	Eva Jin, Pan Anzi, Zhang Jiarui, Song Di	Amber Kuo, Jam Hsiao, Zhao Liying, Rhydian Vaughan, Xia Yu, Mei Ting, Zhang Yi, Gordon Lam, Da Peng, Jiang Jinfu, Sun Yizhou, Chang Xinyuan, Kan Qingzi, Julius Liu, Show Joy, Qian Shan, Eva Jin, White. K, Gabriella Ge, Leni Lan	Comedy / Romance / Family		
F E B R U A R Y	6	An Inspector Calls	Raymond Wong, Herman Yau	Louis Koo, Hans Zhang, Eric Tsang, Teresa Mo, Liu Yan, Gordon Lam, Chrissie Chau, Karena Ng, Raymond Wong, Donnie Yen, Kelly Chen	Comedy / Romance / Suspense / Fantasy	Mainland-Hong Kong co-production	
F E B R U A R Y	6	The Mystery of Death	Ben Wong	Deric Wan, Huang Zheng, Josephine Yu, Sui Shuyang, Yang Xinrui	Suspense / Thriller / Adventure		
F E B R U A R Y	6	One Night Stud	Li Xinman	Jiang Yiyan, Ryan Cheng, Yu Xiao, Chang Fangyuan, Yu Jiameng, Tan Shasha, Shi Chunling, Liu Sha, Li Changlin, Hasi Gaowa, Johnson Chen, Wang Yingran	Comedy / Romance		
F E B R U A R Y	10	Somewhere Only We Know	Xu Jinglei	Kris Wu, Wang Likun, Xu Jinglei, Gordon Alexander, Cong Shan, Juck Zhang, Re Yizha	Romance		
F E B R U A R Y	13	Be Together	Yan Fei	Kristy Yang, Michael Tong, Chi Shuai, Zhou Lingnan	Romance		
F E B R U A R Y	19	Dragon Blade	Daniel Lee	Jackie Chan, John Cusack, Adrien Brody, Lin Peng, Mika Wang, Choi Siwon, Xiao Yang, Wang Taili, Sammy Hung, Yoo Seung-jun, Lorie, Feng Shaofeng, Vanness Wu, Karena Lam, Sharni Vinson, Jozef Waite	Action / War / Costume	Mainland-Hong Kong co-production	
F E B R U A R Y	19	Emperor's Holidays	Wang Yuelun	Guo Tao, Jimmy Lin, Zhang Liang, Wang Yuelun, Tian Liang, Sung Dong-il, Kim Jeong-hoon, Jang Gwang, Jeong Kyeong-ho, Sung Joon, Sung Bin, Angela Wang, Kimi Lin, Zhang Yuexuan, Patrick Guo, Li Jing, Sha Yi, Wang Taili, Mike Sui, Zhang Beibei	Comedy / Family		
F E B R U A R Y	19	From Vegas to Macau II	Wong Jing	Chow Yun-fat, Nick Cheung, Carina Lau, Shawn Yue, Angela Wang, Michelle Hu, David Chiang, Kimmy Tong, Wu Yue, Jin Qiaoqiao, Kenny Wong, Philip Keung, Derek Tsang, Yuan Quan, Eric Tsang, Natalis Chan, Natalie Meng	Comedy / Action	Mainland-Hong Kong co-production	
F E B R U A R Y	19	Triumph in the Skies	Wilson Yip, Matt Chow	Louis Koo, Sammi Cheng, Francis Ng, Julian Cheung, Charmaine Sheh, Amber Kuo, Océane Zhu, Dean Liu, Kenneth Ma, Elena Kong, Jun Kung, Ma Xin, Liao Jingsheng	Drama / Romance	Mainland-Hong Kong co-production	
F E B R U A R Y	19	Where Are We Going, Dad? 2	Xie Dikui, Lin Yan	Huang Lei, Huang Yici, Lu Yi, Lu Yuxuan, Gary Chaw, Joe Chaw, Grace Chaw, Yang Wei, YYY, Li Rui	Family / Child / Reality show		
F E B R U A R Y	19	Wolf Totem	Jean-Jacques Annaud	Feng Shaofeng, Shawn Dou, Ankhnyam Rachaa, Batdorj-in Baasanjab, Yin Zhusheng	Drama / Adventure	Mainland-France co-production	
F E B R U A R Y	19	Xinnian is Coming – Uproar of Chuxi	Yu Mingliang, Yang Xiaojun, Liang Donglong	Zhao Shuting, Fu Jie, Yi Xiaoyin, Chen Zhao, Liang Xiaoqiang, Ma Yufei, Gong Dafang, Li Mi, Zhu Xiaoni	Animation / Fantasy / Adventure		
F E B R U A R Y	19	Zhong Kui: Snow Girl and the Dark Crystal	Peter Pau, Zhao Tianyu	Chen Kun, Li Bingbing, Winston Chao, Yang Zishan, Bao Bei'er, Jike Junyi	Action / Romance / Fantasy	Mainland-Hong Kong-United States co-production	
F E B R U A R Y	21	Legend of a Rabbit: The Martial of Fire	Ma Yuan, Dong Dake	Huang Lei, Yang Zishan, He Yunwei, Wang Jinsong, Wang Yuebo, Ma Yuan, Zhao Huishan, Zhou Qixun, Wang Di, Li Xiaochen, Zhang Yixin, Li Zhou	Action / Animation / Adventure		
M A R C H	1	Lucky Star 2015	Ching Long	Eric Tsang, Wong Cho-lam, Ella Chen, Dada Chan, Wen Chao, Kingdom Yuen, Yuen Qiu, Jessica Jann, Gabriel Wong, Wong Yat-fei, Tin Kai-man, Lollipop F, Cheng Man-fai, Fung Min-hun, Tats Lau, Louis Yuen, Si Ming, Koo Ming-wah, Stephen Au, Fun Lo, Yu Mo-lin, Wen Xiang, Edward Chui, Cliff Chan	Comedy	Mainland-Hong Kong-Taiwan co-production	
M A R C H	5	My Daddy My King	Dong Chunze	Luo Jingmin, Sun Bo, Yu Fei, Ma Yan, Zhao Li, Mi Mingjie, Jia Zhi, Lu Siyi	Comedy		
M A R C H	5	The Right Mistake	Wang Ning	Xiaoshenyang, Tian Liang, Jordan Chan, Lynn Hung, Li Chengru, Christy Chung, Ying Da, Fann Wong	Comedy / Romance		
M A R C H	6	Beijing & New York	Rain Li	Lin Chi-ling, Liu Ye, Richard de Klerk, Maggie Jiang, Wang Xiao, Guan Xueying	Drama / Romance	Mainland-United States-United Kingdom co-production	
M A R C H	6	Mei Li Ben Nu Ren	Pan Jie	Pan Jie, Luo Gang, Zhang Zheren, Li Xuejing, Liu Ranran	Drama	Entered into the 2014 Shanghai International Film Festival	
M A R C H	6	The Prescription for Life	Yang Hu	Tao Hong, Liu Zhibing, Hou Tianlai, Ding Liuyuan, Liu Jian	Drama		
M A R C H	8	Mother's Dream	Hu Dazhong	Wang Liyuan, Hu Dazhong, Shao Feng, Zhao Tieren, Qu Haifeng, Guan Danli, Qu Jiangtao	Drama / Family		
M A R C H	11	Who Moved My Fiancee	Li Sheng	Tian Liang, Zhan Jingyi, Tian Zheng, Nie Xin	Romance		
M A R C H	13	Nowhere to Run	Wang Mengyuan	Ge Tian, Zhang Duo, Liu Ying, Sui Yongliang, Qian Sitong, Du Yuting, Tu Yuwei, Yuchi Shaonan	Mystery / Thriller		
M A R C H	18	Cash Gift	Li Kelong	Wang Qi, Liao Weiwei, Song Ziqiao, Guo Jinjie, Song Jiateng, Luo Bin, Liang Guorong, Yin Guohua, Yin Yuanzhang, Wang Kai, Hu Lianchen, Cai Hongbo, Gan Yu, Ren Lulu	Comedy		
M A R C H	20	Little Big Master	Adrian Kwan	Miriam Yeung, Louis Koo, Richard Ng, Ng Yuen-yee, Philip Keung, Rain Lau, Dhillon Harjit Singh, Stanley Fung, Marc Ma, Lee Ka-wing, Bonnie Wong	Drama	Mainland-Hong Kong co-production	
M A R C H	20	Lost and Love	Peng Sanyuan	Andy Lau, Jing Boran, Tony Leung Ka-fai, Sandra Ng	Drama	Mainland-Hong Kong-Malaysia co-production	
M A R C H	24	Bright Wedding	Yuan Ye	Jianan Hailin, Cheng Pei-pei, Tang Shiyan, Li Fengming, Xiao Zongling, Zhang Xin, Peng Bo	Comedy / Romance		
M A R C H	27	10000 Years Later	Yi Li	Li Siru, Wang Chong, Zhou Ting, Wang Lu, Liu Donghong, Liu Pingping	Action / Fantasy		
M A R C H	27	Rookie	Frank Xiang	Alan Ko, Choi Yoon-so, Chen Xuedong, Zhang Aiqing, Luo Kaiyuan, Xu Mingfei, Cheng Sitao, Liu Yapeng	Comedy / Romance		

=== April–June ===
Opening		Title	Director	Cast	Genre	Notes	Ref.
A P R I L	2	Let's Get Married	Liu Jiang	Gao Yuanyuan, Jiang Wu, Li Chen, Zheng Kai, Ivy Chen, Bea Hayden, Liu Tao, Wang Zijian, Ming Dao, Sa Rina, Zhang Duo, Ryan Zuo, Monica Mok, Tu Honggang, Ying Zhuang, Jerry, Fan Ming, Jiang Ping, Wang Tong, Liu Tianchi	Romance		
A P R I L	2	Wolf Warriors	Wu Jing	Wu Jing, Yu Nan, Scott Adkins, Kevin Lee, Ni Dahong, Shi Zhaoqi, Zhou Xiaoou, Fang Zibin, Guo Guangping, Ru Ping, Hong Wei	Action / War		
A P R I L	3	Highway of Love	Fei Ke, Zhou Kan	Qi Xi, Zhang Nianhua, Song Ning, Kalsang Drolma, Yu Rongguang, Wang Ji, Yu Entai, Zhong Tongxi	Drama / Romance		
A P R I L	3	Insanity	David Lee	Sean Lau, Huang Xiaoming, Alex Fong, Fiona Sit, Paw Hee-ching, Michelle Ye, Fredric Mao, Alien Sun, Bonnie Xian, Michelle Wai, Lee Kwok-lun	Mystery / Thriller	Mainland-Hong Kong co-production	
A P R I L	3	The Invincible Piglet	Song Zhantao	Cheung Lap-wai, Zhang Zhilu, Norman Chu, Caterina Murino, Fan Zixuan, He Yuehan, Huang Zanchen, Yu Dongze, Fan Zexi, Zhu Zhelin, Xiao Xiafei	Animation / Children / Fantasy / Adventure		
A P R I L	3	Midnight Garage	Zhou Yaowu	Alex Fong, Yoon So-yi, Gordon Lam, Tse Kwan-ho, Bai Ru, Cho Sung-bin, Jiang Zhongwei	Mystery / Thriller / Horror		
A P R I L	3	Outcast	Nick Powell	Hayden Christensen, Nicolas Cage, Liu Yifei, Andy On, Anoja Dias Bolt, Jike Junyi, Su Jiahang, Coco Wang	Action / History / War / Costume	Mainland-United States co-production	
A P R I L	10	Kung Fu Style	Xu Kerr	Huang Ying, Cao Zhen, Zhang Anqi, Li Zhengxiang, Cheng Yuzhu, Hai Fang, Liu Bin, Hu Yi, Meng Xianglong, Ye Lu, Wei Siyun, Wang Jianxin, Zhan Jia	Comedy / Action / Animation / Adventure		
A P R I L	16	Gun Transit	Liang Jie	An Zehao, Alex Fong, Wang Shuangbao, Ji Chunhua, Vincent Chiao	Action / Suspense / Crime	Entered into the 2014 Chinese American Film Festival	
A P R I L	16	The Queens	Annie Yi	Song Hye-kyo, Shawn Dou, Joe Chen, Tony Yang, Vivian Wu, Jiang Wu, Joe Cheng, Qin Hao, Annie Yi	Drama / Romance		
A P R I L	17	Ever Since We Love	Li Yu	Fan Bingbing, Han Geng, Qi Xi, Yang Di, Zhang Boyu, Zhao Yiwei, Shen Tingting, Wu Mochou, Sha Yi, Lei Kesheng, Vivien Li, Lü Xing	Comedy / Romance		
A P R I L	17	Scary Road is Fun	Samm Chan	Zhang Junning, Michael Tong, He Haoyang, Zhang Weixun, Yao Wenxue, Pan Yanfei, Li Ang, Yang Di, Kingdom Yuen	Comedy / Thriller		
A P R I L	24	The Left Ear	Alec Su	Chen Duling, Ou Oho, Yang Yang, Ma Sichun, Duan Bowen, Hu Xia, Guan Xiaotong, Bao Wenjing, Jiang Wenli, Chen Taishen, Xie Na	Romance		
A P R I L	30	Lovers and Movies	Niu Chaoyang	Francis Ng, Yu Nan, Kim Bum, Gulnazar, Simon Yam, Kara Hui, Zhang Xueying, Wang Zongze, Jiang Wu, Niu Ben, Lu Yuan	Comedy / Romance		
A P R I L	30	Red Amnesia	Wang Xiaoshuai	Lü Zhong, Feng Yuanzheng, Qin Hailu, Qin Hao, Shi Liu	Drama / Crime	Entered into the 71st Venice International Film Festival	
A P R I L	30	Teenage Mao Zedong	Lei Junlin	Xie Qiheng, Xiao Han, Xu Zimo, Fang Jinkun, Ni Tianqi, Zhou Siping, Yang Huizi, Hou Yaohua, Li Yang, Liu Cong, Fu Bowen, Song Xiaojun	Animation / Children / Adventure		
A P R I L	30	You Are My Sunshine	Yang Wenjun, Huang Bin	Huang Xiaoming, Yang Mi, Tong Dawei, Angelababy, Xie Yilin, Edison Huang, Joan Chen, Sui He, Ma Su, Hua Shao, Eric Tsang, Yao Anlian, Sun Yizhou, Kong Lianshun, Shen Tai, Liu Tianzuo	Romance		
M A Y	1	Follow Me My Queen	Liu Xin	Lin Yongjian, Han Xue, Song Yunhao, Song Dandan, Li Jingjing	Comedy / Romance		
M A Y	8	Relationship Dilemma	Yang Xiaoxin	Ying Yuan, Yu Jia, Huang Junjun, Zhang Tianye, Jin Luoyi, Liu Qiushi, Dong Cheng	Romance		
M A Y	8	War on a String	Li Kai	Vincent Chiao, Andrew Lin, Lin Jinfeng, Han Qiuchi, Qi Yunpeng, Peng Bo, Gao Fei, Hu Shuangquan	Action / Suspense / Crime / Noir		
M A Y	15	12 Citizens	Xu Ang	He Bing, Han Tongsheng, Qian Bo, Zhao Chunyang, Mi Tiezen, Gao Dongping, Zhang Yongqiang, Li Guangfu, Wang Gang, Ban Zan, Liu Hui, Lei Jia	Drama / Mystery / Crime	Entered into the 2014 Rome Film Festival	
M A Y	15	The Beloved	Cao Dawei	Wang Likun, Kim Bum, Joe Cheng, Guan Yu, Li Haoyu, Zhang Cheng, Jiang Peiyan, Toby Lee	Romance / Suspense		
M A Y	15	Death Trip	Billy Tang	Victor Wong, Zeng Yongti, Han Bo-reum, Chen Feng, Law Kar-ying	Thriller		
M A Y	15	Mr. Deng Goes to Washington	Fu Hongxing	Deng Xiaoping, Jimmy Carter, Henry Kissinger, Zbigniew Brzezinski, Rina Sa, Chan Tin-suen	Documentary / Biography / History		
M A Y	21	Love Without Distance	Lam Oi-wah	Francis Ng, Yao Xingtong, Ma Tianyu, Li Jing, Cica Zhou	Comedy / Romance		
M A Y	22	Feed Me	Yang Yazhou, Yang Bo	Yu Nan, Tao Zeru, Lin Hao, Vivian Wu	Drama	Entered into the 2013 Montreal World Film Festival	
M A Y	22	Unforgettable Blast	Yan Tinglu	Jo Jiang, Jiang Xueming, Wang Xia, Yang Qing, Luo Jia, Jiang Yihong, Lei Di	Comedy		
M A Y	23	Alibaba and the Thief	Zheng Chengfeng	Ye Fang, Ding Yan, Zhang Yang, Wu Rui, Yang Yang, Wang Qi, Sun Ke, Zhang YuanZhong, Wang Xueqin, Wang Yalin, Lu Yao	Animation / Children / Adventure		
M A Y	29	Dawn Break Up	Li Kai	Daniel Chan, Yin Hang, Shone An	Drama / Romance		
M A Y	29	The Grow 2	Ha Lei	Yu Li, Wu Tianhao, Rong Rong, Zhang Yuan	Comedy / Animation / Adventure		
M A Y	29	Happy Little Submarine Magic Box of Time	He Zili	Fan Churong, Hong Haitian, Xie Yuanzhen, Wang Yanhua, Tan Mantang, Li Ye	Animation / Adventure		
M A Y	29	Unmissable	Du Qiquan, Qi Zixuan	Zeng Hongchang, Lv Zhuoran, Cui Hang, Ma Li, Zhao Ran, Qie Lutong, Joan Zheng	Drama / Romance		
M A Y	30	The Horizon of the Child	Miao Shu	Du Haitao, Mu Mengjiao, Shi Xuanru, Zhao Tieren, Liu Ning, Xue Lizhi, Liu Gang, Yang Jingru	Drama / Children		
M A Y	30	Rabbit Hero	Fu Yan	Liu Hongyun, Li Xuqiao, Bai Wenxian, Shen Ke, Song Lei, Zhou Yan, Li Sixian, Zhang Zikun, Li Taichen, Dong Yuxin	Comedy / Sci-Fi / Animation		
J U N E	5	Free Ride	Li Guangde, Yue Xiaolin	Wang Yong, Zhang Huizhong, Zhou Xiaoou, Shao Feng, Zhao Pu, Wang Kai, Shui Pi, Shi Shusi, Yuan Yue, Mary Ma, Xia Hua, Wu Aiyi, Lucy Li, Wang Xiaolong, Zhang Zhuowen	Comedy / Romance		
J U N E	5	Lost in Wrestling	Casey Chan	William Chan, Karina Zhao, Li Feier, Naoko Watanabe, Siqin Gaowa, Cheng Pei-pei, Li Yixin, Lau Siu-ming, Lau Dan	Action	Mainland-Hong Kong co-production	
J U N E	5	Monsters	Guo Hua	Liu Qing, Zhou Haodong, Wu Yanyan, Zhao Qianzi, Yu Zijian, Shang Hong, Li Wenjie, Luo Xuan	Suspense / Thriller / Horror		
J U N E	6	My Dear Little Naughty	Tin Jun	Zhang Lei, Wu Zhefan, Nie Yaliang, Masanobu Otsuka, Qin Wenjing, Ming Li, Jia Lili, Yan Xiaopin, Mao Lishuai	Comedy / Children		
J U N E	12	Who Am I 2015	Song Yinxi	Wang Haixiang, Yao Xingtong, Zhang Lanxin, Yu Rongguang, Ken Lo, Yang Zheng, Tony Ho	Comedy / Action		
J U N E	12	Zai Jian Wo Men De Shi Nian	Sun Hao	Guo Jiaming, Liu Yun, Mike Sui, Pan Shuangshuang, Miki Yeung, Li Yanan, Wang Xiaokun, Denny Huang	Comedy / Romance		
J U N E	18	SPL II: A Time for Consequences	Cheang Pou-soi	Tony Jaa, Wu Jing, Zhang Jin, Simon Yam, Louis Koo, Ken Lo, Jun Kung, Dominic Lam, Babyjohn Choi, Wilson Tsui, Philip Keung, Zhang Chi, Keu Zhan-wen	Drama / Action / Crime	Mainland-Hong Kong co-production	
J U N E	19	Admission by Guts	Wang Ming	Lin Xiaofan, Yao Yiqi, Jiang Zhongwei, Wang Ye, Grace Qiu, Mei Wenze, Zhao Yuanyuan, Hong Tu, Yu Qingbin	Thriller		
J U N E	19	The Ark of Mr. Chow	Xiao Yang	Sun Honglei, Zhou Dongyu, Dong Zijian, Wang Yuexin, Zhao Lixin, Liu Xilong, Li Jiaqi, Xia Tian	Drama / Comedy		
J U N E	20	Rock Hero	Tan Hua	Qin Hao, Vivien Li, Cya Liu, Dou Ri Zhao Ri Ge Tu, Ma Kaiman, Li Qingyun, Guo Weilong, Li Mengchen, Wang Chen-hao, Li Xinran	Drama / Romance / Music		
J U N E	25	Come Back, Love	Xie Shenghao	Ken Chang, Ni Jingyang, Qiao Shan, Tong Chun-chung, Wang Yi	Comedy / Romance		
J U N E	26	Bloody Destiny	Zang Xichuan	Gu Shangwei, Choi Yoon-so, Du Haitao, Bryan Leung, Feng Xinyao, Feng Gang	Drama / Action / Romance		
J U N E	26	Cannot Prove	Li Pingping	Mai Hongmei, Liu Xiao, Jason Chu, Gao Longke, Zhang Qiying	Mystery / Crime		
J U N E	26	Hollywood Adventures	Zhao Wei, Huang Xiaoming, Tong Dawei	Comedy / Action / Romance / Adventure	Mainland-Hong Kong-United States co-production		
J U N E	26	I Love You, Too.	Ismene Ting	Xu Qing, Che Xiao, Hu Qiaohua, Chen Wu-kang, Chu Chung-heng, Tang Tsung-sheng	Comedy / Romance	Mainland-Taiwan co-production	
J U N E	26	We Will Make It Right	Liu Shujuan	Yan Bingyan, Bao Jianfeng, Song Xiaoying, Jiang Hongbo	Drama		
J U N E	27	The Three Pigs and the Lamp	Liu Wei	Hong Haitian, Li Ye, Wang Yanhua, Fu Chong	Comedy / Animation / Adventure		
J U N E	27	Xiao Zhu Ban Na Zhi Meng Xiang Da Mao Xian	Zhang Ming, Weng Zhaohui	Fan Churong, Hu Qian, Fu Chong, Wang Yanhua, Luo Yuting, Li Ye, Zhou Nanfei, Li Zhengxiang, Liu Beichen, You Jun, Jiang Ke	Animation / Adventure		

=== July–September ===
Opening		Title	Director	Cast	Genre	Notes	Ref.
J U L Y	1	Silently Love	Zeng Jianfeng	Mao Hai, Huang Yi, Jin Qiaoqiao, Guo Jinglin, He Gang, Cheng Yuanyuan, Zhong Qiu, Kent Tong, Wang Luyao	Drama / Romance		
J U L Y	3	Chang Chen Ghost Stories	Xu Zhengchao	Hans Zhang, Zhang Li, Li Xin'ai, Zhang Haoran, Ryan Zhu, Kong Wei, Frank Fan	Mystery / Thriller		
J U L Y	3	I am Somebody	Derek Yee	Wan Guopeng, Wang Ting, Shen Kai, Xu Xiaoqin, Lin Chen, Wei Xing, Hao Yifan, Hao Yifei, Qin Peijun, Wang Zhao, Zhang Wenbin, Lin Jian, Geng Lishu, Zhang Xilai, Zhou Peng, Kou Jun, Jiang Tao	Comedy	Entered into the 2015 Shanghai International Film Festival	
J U L Y	3	Love Simply	Yan Cui	Ambrose Hui, Zhang Lin, Xie Yuqin, Shi Mingxi, Zhao Tan, Han Yuxuan, Qiu Si, Li Yang	Romance		
J U L Y	3	Monk Comes Down the Mountain	Chen Kaige	Wang Baoqiang, Aaron Kwok, Chang Chen, Lin Chi-ling, Fan Wei, Yuen Wah, Vanness Wu, Wang Xueqi, Danny Chan Kwok-kwan, Lam Suet, Dong Qi, Li Xuejian, Tian Zhuangzhuang, Tiger Chen	Comedy / Fantasy / Adventure	Mainland-United States co-production	
J U L Y	3	Xi You Xin Chuan 2: Zhen Xin Hua Da Mao Xian	Liu Chang	Li Xiaomeng, Li Jiayi, Lin Qiang, Zhang Sheng, Liang Gayuan, Xu Mengjuan, Wang Nan, Chen Zhao, Li Xia	Comedy / Animation / Children / Adventure		
J U L Y	4	The Autobots	Zhuo Jianrong	Liu Xinxuan, Sheng Hua, Yuan Wenge, Hu Dawei, Xia Tian, Yao Yulan, Huang Yuhai, Xu Xinhui	Comedy / Animation / Adventure		
J U L Y	9	Tiny Times 4	Guo Jingming	Yang Mi, Amber Kuo, Cheney Chen, Bea Hayden, Xie Yilin, Lee Hyun-jae, Vivian Dawson, Ming Ren, Jiang Chao, Wang Lin, Kiwi Shang	Drama / Comedy / Romance		
J U L Y	10	Dear, Don't Be Afraid	Yu Dange, Cao Anjun	Du Yuchen, Ren Peng, Wang Qianhang, Yin Guiyong, Liu Jingyi, Han Xuantong	Thriller		
J U L Y	10	Forever Young	He Jiong	Li Yifeng, Zhang Huiwen, Jiang Jinfu, Wei Daxun, Calvin Tu, Zhang Yuxi, Li Xin'ai, Song Yi, Zhang Yunlong, Chai Ge, Wang Youshuo	Romance		
J U L Y	10	GG Bond Movie: Ultimate Battle	Lu Jinming, Lu Jinhui	Lu Shuang, Chen Zhirong, Zu Qing, Xu Jingwei, Chen Yi, Wang Ping, Sun Bo	Comedy / Animation / Adventure		
J U L Y	10	Monkey King: Hero Is Back	Tian Xiaopeng	Zhang Lei, Lin Zijie, Wu Wenlun, Tong Zirong, Liu Jiurong, Wu Di, Liu Beichen, Zhao Qianjing, Zhou Shuai	Comedy / Action / Animation / Fantasy		
J U L Y	11	Nezha	Li Xiaofeng	Li Jiaqi, Li Haofei, Chen Jin, Xin Peng, Li Huan	Drama	Entered into the 19th Busan International Film Festival	
J U L Y	16	Monster Hunt	Raman Hui	Bai Baihe, Jing Boran, Jiang Wu, Elaine Jin, Wallace Chung, Eric Tsang, Sandra Ng, Tang Wei, Yao Chen, Yan Ni, Bao Jianfeng, Wang Yuexin, Guo Xiaodong, Li Jingjing, Cindy Tian, Zhang Yuexuan	Comedy / Fantasy		
J U L Y	17	Jian Bing Man	Da Peng	Da Peng, Mabel Yuan, Liu Yan, Sandra Ng, Eric Tsang, Yue Yunpeng, Yi Yunhe, Liang Chao, Pan Binlong, Cui Zhijia, Qiao Shan, Deng Chao, Amber Kuo, Jean-Claude Van Damme, Xiaoshenyang, Song Xiaobao, Liu Xiaoguang, Wang Xiaoli, Chen Sicheng, Lin Gengxin, Chen Yufan, Cannon Hu, Han Han, Chen He, Zheng Kai, Bao Bei'er	Comedy		
J U L Y	17	Magic Barber	Qin Hai	You You, Zhang Ran, Mimi Chu, Wong Yat-fei, Cui Haobo, Wang Zixuan, Liu Jiayi	Comedy / Romance		
J U L Y	23	Aola Star	Frankie Chung	Zhang Anqi, Zhang Qi, Li Zhengxiang, Zhou Shuai, Liu Beichen, Jin Feng, Zhao Lu, Zhan Jia, Meng Xianglong	Animation / Children / Fantasy / Adventure		
J U L Y	23	Seer Movie 5: Rise of Thunder	Wang Zhangjun	Luo Yuting, Zhai Wei, Wang Xiaotong, Sun Ye, Johnny Wu, Jiang Ke, Liu Beichen, Li Ye	Drama / Animation / Children / Adventure		
J U L Y	24	Dream Defender	Zhang Li	Deric Wan, Teddy Lin, Zhang Chao, Lin Peng, Zhang Huan, Wu Jinxi, Kang Junlong, Dong Nina, Han Shuer, Yu Jilu, Du Jun, Zhao Ju, Yang Meng, Sun Shuaihang, Gao Dejun	Drama		
J U L Y	24	The Hero Chiyou	Zhang Jizhong, Li Dawei, Zhao Jian	Tan Kai, Zhu Xiaoyu, Han Dong, Qin Xue, Zhang Hengping, Zhao Lixin, Liang Dawei, Song Jialing, Hou Yingjue, Zhang He	Action / Romance / Fantasy		
J U L Y	24	The Strange House	Danny Pang Phat	Xu Jiao, Cheung Siu-fai, Tian Zitian, Lu Siyu, Song Yi, Bi Xiuru	Thriller / Horror		
J U L Y	24	Only You	Zhang Hao	Tang Wei, Liao Fan, Su Yan, Fang Fang, Liu Tao, Xie Dongshen	Comedy / Romance	Mainland-Hong Kong-United States co-production	
J U L Y	28	Love Will Be Back	Kang Ning	Julian Chen, Zhang Dinghan, Xie Fang, Wu Ma, Zhang Di, Apple Hong, Cao Li, Hu Yue, Sun Weilun, Sun Zihao, Eric Li	Comedy / Romance / Suspense		
J U L Y	30	The Crossing: Part 2	John Woo	Zhang Ziyi, Takeshi Kaneshiro, Song Hye-kyo, Huang Xiaoming, Tong Dawei, Masami Nagasawa, Qin Hailu, Cong Shan, Angeles Woo, Yu Zhen, Faye Yu, Tony Yang, Yang Kuei-mei, Wang Qianyuan, Bowie Lam, Lin Mei-hsiu, Jack Kao, Denny Huang, Kou Chia-jui, Xu Huanhuan, You Yong, Liu Yiwei, Hitomi Kuroki, Johnny Kou	Drama / Romance	Mainland-Hong Kong co-production	
J U L Y	30	Lady of the Dynasty	Shi Qing	Fan Bingbing, Leon Lai, Wu Chun, Joan Chen, Wu Gang, Ning Jing, Jin Hao, Chen Baoguo, Wen Zhang, Qin Yi, Tu Honggang, Wu Yue	Romance / Costume		
J U L Y	30	Wild City	Ringo Lam	Louis Koo, Shawn Yue, Tong Liya, Joseph Chang, Michael Tse, Yuen Qiu, Sam Lee, Philip Ng, Philip Keung, Alex Lam, Simon Yam, Jack Kao, Marc Ma, Tam Ping-man	Action / Thriller / Crime	Mainland-Hong Kong co-production	
J U L Y	31	The Little Mermaid: Attack of the Pirates	Adam Qiu	Li Sixian, Guo Yawei, Song Lei, Shen Ke	Comedy / Animation / Fantasy / Adventure		
J U L Y	31	The Making of a Man	Tao Mengxi	Law Kar-ying, Juan Zi, Guo Jinjie, Zhao Yaqi, Liu Qi, Chen Shi, Wang Feihong	Comedy		
J U L Y	31	Paris Holiday	James Yuen	Louis Koo, Amber Kuo, Jones Xu, Candy Liu, Alex Fong, Hu Jing, Janice Man, Anthony Chan, Simon Lui, Michelle Wai, Carl Ng, Carlos Chan	Comedy / Romance	Mainland-Hong Kong co-production	
J U L Y	31	Who in the Pool	Yuan Jie	Zhang Lanyi, Ding Huiyu, Du Jing, Yan Weier, Yao Yuxin, Du Qiao, Zhong Chao, Jiang Yuxi	Thriller		
A U G U S T	4	Sword of Hope	Li Zhi	Jonny Chen, Lan Yingying, Gu Youming, Yang Xin, Shang Yisha, Jin Wanhong	Action / Fantasy / Adventure		
A U G U S T	6	Love in the Office	Hou Liang	Chen He, Helen Yao, Chang Yuan, Lu Haitao, Zhang Songwen, Jang Woo-hyuk, Zhao Yihuan	Comedy		
A U G U S T	6	Kwai Boo	Wang Yunfei	Wang Yunfei, Ah Gui, Yang Tianxiang, Shan Xin, Tang Xiaoxi, He Guannan, Tute Hameng, A Jie, Baomu Zhongyang, Liu Xiaoyu	Comedy / Sci-Fi / Animation		
A U G U S T	7	Love, At First	Hai Tao	Juck Zhang, Li Xiaofeng, David Wu, Zhang Yao, Qu Jingjing, Tom Price, Mike Sui, Cya Liu, Cecilia Yip	Comedy / Romance		
A U G U S T	7	Legend of Didao	Zhang Zhong	Wu Rigen, Xia Qing, Chen Sina, Li Xiaowen, Wu Kegang, Dong Danjun, Tang Ping, Du Shaojie, Zhu Hang	Romance / History / Costume		
A U G U S T	7	Mr. Black: Green Star	Yu Shengjun, Shi Xuegang, Qing Song, Shi Yi	Zhao Lu, Wu Tianhao, Lin Zijie, Liu Ying, Cheng Yuzhu, Li Chuanying, Zhan Jia, Tao Dian, Shi Jiajia, Yu Shengjun, Dai Jiayi, Dai Chaohang, Liu Shengbo, Yin Xiaoyu, Zhang Yandong, Zhang Zheng, Guan Rui, Shi Xuegang	Comedy / Action / Sci-Fi / Animation		
A U G U S T	7	The Best Love	Ren Xiaoxi	Bai Kainan, Liu Chenxi, Ren Mingsong	Drama / Comedy / Family / Children		
A U G U S T	7	The Buried Secret	Guan Er	Lee Wei, Mei Lier, Waise Lee, Lin Hao, Shi Xiaoman, Yang Meng, Yao Gang	Mystery / Thriller		
A U G U S T	7	The Spirit of the Swords	Chen Yongge	Nicholas Tse, Gillian Chung, Qiao Zhenyu, Annie Yi, Patrick Tam, Ji Chunhua, Yang Rui, Zhao Hongfei, Zhou Li, Xu Xiangdong	Martial Arts / Costume		
A U G U S T	7	Time to Love	Song Di	Ivy Chen, Shawn Dou, Tony Yang, Ireine Song, Yu Bo, Chen Taishen, Du Zhiguo, Gu Bao-ming, Zhou Junchao, Mohe Taer, Du Yuming, Guo Hong	Romance / Fantasy / Costume		
A U G U S T	7	To the Fore	Dante Lam	Eddie Peng, Shawn Dou, Choi Siwon, Wang Luodan, Carlos Chan, Ouyang Nana, Andrew Lin	Drama / Sports	Mainland-Hong Kong co-production	
A U G U S T	7	Where Are All The Time	Che Jingxing	Dylan Kuo, Yang Zi, Vincent Chiao, Gao Yaxuan, Pan Yuchen, Wang Sisi	Drama / Romance		
A U G U S T	13	Detective Gui	Oxide Pang	Wang Luodan, Vic Chou, Simon Yam, Paw Hee-ching, Tien Hsin, Shek Sau, Maggie Shiu	Comedy / Romance / Suspense	Mainland-Hong Kong-Taiwan co-production	
A U G U S T	13	Go Away Mr. Tumor	Han Yan	Bai Baihe, Daniel Wu, Li Yuan, Lui Ruilin, Cheng Yi, Liu Lili, Li Jianyi	Comedy / Romance		
A U G U S T	13	Roco Kingdom 4	Hugues Martel, Cao Dongbiao	Zhang Qi, Hu Xia, Lin Ying, Guan Xiaotong, Tao Dian, Zhan Jia, Zhao Lu, Zhang Xin, Liu Beichen, Bai Yue, Liu Shengbo	Animation / Fantasy / Adventure		
A U G U S T	14	A Promise to the Kurichenko's	Shen Dong	Shirley Dai, Wu Qijiang, Xu Jian, Jiang Ruijia, Song Chunli, Zhao Xiaoming, Li Youbin, Lu Qi	Drama		
A U G U S T	14	Snow White: The Mysterious Father	Zhao Ben	Yan Mengmeng, Cao Xupeng, Gao Mingyu, Ma Banma, A Jie, Qu Aohui, Wang Guannan, Gao Feng, Xiao Yan, Lin Lan	Comedy / Animation / Fantasy / Adventure		
A U G U S T	14	Mid-July Days	Du Xiaoao	Yu Xintian, Zhai Zimo, Ma Yuan, Fu Man, Chen Meixing, Xu Qian, Kong Ming, Dai Zixiang, Peng Qian, Liang Liwen	Mystery / Thriller		
A U G U S T	14	Wild Speed	Yuan Ye	Anastasia Sedikoa, Michelle Fabrice, Szigethi Szabolcs, Shapovalov Anton, Gladka Iryna, He Zijian, He Wei	Action / Romance / Adventure	Mainland-United States co-production	
A U G U S T	15	Happy Panda 2: Panda Hero Legend	Wu Jia, Tang Jiye	Zhang Ai, Yang Kan, Jiang Yeting, Gong Fei, Xia Ying, Yang Ni, Wang Yin	Animation / Adventure		
A U G U S T	20	Bride Wars	Tony Chan	Angelababy, Ni Ni, Chen Xiao, Zhu Yawen, He Jiong, Liu Jinshan, Wang Yinan, Xi Wang, Jing Boran, Du Haitao	Comedy / Romance	Mainland-Hong Kong co-production	
A U G U S T	20	Cities in Love	Wen Muye, Dong Runnian, Han Yi, Fu Tien-yu, Yi Jiatong	Yang Mi, Zheng Kai-yuan, Jiang Shuying, Lee Hyun-jae, Sandrine Pinna, Huang Xuan, Jiang Yiyan, Joseph Chang, Bai Baihe, Ethan Juan	Romance		
A U G U S T	20	Only You	Zhao Yiran	Ryan Zuo, Jiang Chao, Mu Tingting, Xiao Xu, Zhang Lei, Shi Xuanru	Comedy / Romance		
A U G U S T	21	Ballet in the Flames of War	Dong Yachun	Cao Shuci, Egor Koreshkov, Natalya Surkova, Du Yuan, Chen Jin, Liu Zhibing, Kazumi Ishihara, Shigeo Kobayashi, Yoshihiro Minami, Hou Tianlai, Wu Jun	Drama / War	Entered into the 2015 Shanghai International Film Festival	
A U G U S T	21	Twin Spirit	Qin Zhen	Cha Ye-ryun, Chang Yiran, Liu Jiajia, Liu Guanlin, Yin Fei	Mystery / Thriller		
A U G U S T	25	Entrapment	An Lan	Gong Zheng, Hou Yong, Lu Peng, Luo Yukun, Gao Ming, Mo Yang	Drama / War		
A U G U S T	27	The Assassin	Hou Hsiao-hsien	Shu Qi, Chang Chen, Zhou Yun, Satoshi Tsumabuki, Ethan Juan, Nikki Hsieh, Ni Dahong, Yong Mei, Lei Zhenyu, Fang-Yi Sheu, Jacques Picoux, Chang Shao-Huai, Shih Chun, Mei Fang	Drama / Action / Martial Arts / Costume	Taiwan-Mainland-Hong Kong-France co-production	
A U G U S T	27	The Dead End	Cao Baoping	Deng Chao, Duan Yihong, Guo Tao, Wang Luodan, Jackie Lui, Li Xiaochuan, Du Zhiguo, Xu Xihan, Yan Bei, Wang Yanhui, Bai Liuxi, Gao Hu	Drama / Mystery / Crime	Entered into the 2015 Shanghai International Film Festival	
A U G U S T	27	Tale of Three Cities	Mabel Cheung	Sean Lau, Tang Wei, Qin Hailu, Jing Boran, Huang Jue, Elaine Jin, Li Jianyi, Jiao Gang, Philip Chan	Drama / Romance	Mainland-Hong Kong co-production	
A U G U S T	27	Wild Desert	Zhen Ren	Shao Bing, Dong Xuan, Peng Bo, Chen Zhenghua, Ilyar Ablimit, Li Ming, Yang Haichao, Na Lin, Xie Yi, Li Kuna	Action / Adventure		
A U G U S T	28	A Jewish Girl in Shanghai: The Mystery of the Necklace	Yao Guanghua	Huang Ying, Hong Haitian, Luo Yuting, Hu Qian, Fan Churong, Gui Nan, Peng Bo, Wu Xiangtong, Zhai Wei, Li Zhengxiang, Liu Yijia, Jia Zhichao, You Jun	Animation / History / Adventure		
A U G U S T	28	Doomed Disaster	Yang Jingze	Tong Liya, Leon Jay Williams, Zhu Zhu, Liu Jia, Wang Haixiang, Kent Tong, Tian Ling, Hu Rongrong, Xiao Jian, Kong Ming, Shang Bingchi	Romance / Mystery / Thriller		
A U G U S T	28	Fighting Youth	Hong Shui	Oscar Sun, Mao Xiaotong, Van Fan, Yolanda Yang, Wei Daxun, Kingdom Yuen, Fu Mengni, Zhang Yangyang	Comedy / Romance	Entered into the 2015 Shanghai International Film Festival	
A U G U S T	28	Hundred Regiments Offensive	Ning Haiqiang, Zhang Yuzhong	Tang Guoqiang, Wang Wufu, Tao Zeru, Liu Zhibing, Yin Xiaotian, Wu Yue, Song Yuncheng, Zhao Xiaoming, Yasuyuki Hirata, Namihiko Ohmura, Deng Chao	History / War		
S E P T E M B E R	1	Upheaval of Jiawu	Liu Quanwei	Zhao Yuying, Wu Yunfei, Feng Bing, Han Yifei	Drama / Romance / War		
S E P T E M B E R	2	The Honey Enemy	Zhang Linzi	Zhang Yuqi, Kwon Sang-woo, Wallace Huo, Shi Yanfei	Comedy / Romance		
S E P T E M B E R	2	Office	Johnnie To	Chow Yun-fat, Sylvia Chang, Eason Chan, Tang Wei, Wang Ziyi, Lang Yueting, Cheung Siu-fai, Tien Hsin, Stephanie Che, Timmy Hung, Mickey Chu, Mimi Kung	Comedy / Romance	Mainland-Hong Kong co-production	
S E P T E M B E R	2	The Old Cinderella 2	Xu Zhengchao	Ming Ren, Li Feier, Lee Hyun-jae, Joan Zheng, Dennis Kane, Aomiz Suchar, Lance Luu, Mark Luu, Charles Luu, Li Zhihui	Comedy / Romance		
S E P T E M B E R	2	Rivalry	Hu Mingkai	An Zehao, Zhuo Fan, Kou Zhenhai, Yan Jie, Zhang Lianxi, Fu Yanan, Wang Xiyuan, Wang Xiang, Zhou Linsong, Qian Cancan, Wang Yijia	Crime		
S E P T E M B E R	3	Bedside Cry	Zheng Laizhi, Lai Xi	Lai Xi, Wang Yajie, Andrew Lin, Law Kar-ying, Liu Bohan, Wang Lele, Sheng Shitou, Tian Hua	Romance / Thriller		
S E P T E M B E R	3	Cairo Declaration	Wen Deguang, Hu Minggang	Hu Jun, Carina Lau, Cecilia Han, Ma Xiaowei, Tang Guoqiang, Yao Di, Joan Chen, He Zhengjun, Yu Zifei, Zhang Shen, Hai Bo, Zeng Qiusheng, Xu Fengnian, Alexander Pavlov, Namihiko Ohmura, Shinji Kuroki	Drama / History		
S E P T E M B E R	3	Enchanted Mirror Romance	Zheng Chengfeng	Qi Qi, Wang Qi, Sun Ke, Ye Fang, Yang Yang, Zhang Yang, Liu Yang, Zhang Daoxing, Ding Yan	Animation / Family / Fantasy / Adventure		
S E P T E M B E R	3	The Road	Liu Binjie	Ye Zuxin, Bai Kainan, Ba Duo, Nian Xianer, Xue Cun, Li Jing, Man Yutong, Wang Ganggang, Rocking Long, Rhythm Long, Fu Yuxuanqi	Comedy		
S E P T E M B E R	3	The Young Yang Jingyu	Zhang Wenyi	Ye Yicheng, Wen Jiayi, Ma Xinhao, Du Xudong, Li Sihan	Drama / Children		
S E P T E M B E R	4	XFHJ	Ma Yong	Zhang Xiaojun, Zhang Xiai, Mu Yuhua, Yao Hongjun, Lu Xiaolu, Sun Zhan, Deng Yangning, Pei Yuchen, Lin Aixuan	Comedy / Romance / Family		
S E P T E M B E R	8	The Age of Innocence	Song Qi	Wasir Chou, Kim Jun-ho, Luo Xiangjin, Liu Yindi, Yan Junjie, Liao Xueqiu	Drama / Romance		
S E P T E M B E R	10	The Calligraphy Master	Ding Yinnan, Ding Zhen	Ma Enran, Wang Fuli, Kong Xiangyu, Zhang Shaogang, Zhang Weixun, Liu Lin, Ding Dang, Cheng Qian, Na Renhua, Yang Lixin	Drama / Biography		
S E P T E M B E R	11	A Dongguan Girl	Fang Wenhua, Dong Zhenye	Xie Huiqing, Liu Zhibing, Fang Qingzhuo, Ru Ping, Li Ge, Li Weidong, Liang Chenyu	Drama		
S E P T E M B E R	11	Fight Against Landlords	Han Zhao	Han Zhao, Liu Hua, Mai Hongmei, Cao Suifeng, Pan Changjiang, Lei Mu, Yin Yezi	Comedy		
S E P T E M B E R	11	Fly Me to Venus	Deng Ke	Wang Chuanjun, Dong Weijia, David Chen, Qi Jiuzhou, Tim Li, Hugo Ng	Romance		
S E P T E M B E R	11	Love in the 1980s	Huo Jianqi	Lu Fangsheng, Yang Caiyu	Drama / Romance	Entered into the 2015 Shanghai International Film Festival	
S E P T E M B E R	17	Ulterior Motive	Arthur Wong	Gordon Lam, Qin Lan, Simon Yam, Archie Kao, Liu Wei, Steven Miao, Gao Xin, Qu Jingjing, Ren Shan	Action / Mystery / Crime		
S E P T E M B E R	18	Image on Fire	Li Tao		Documentary		
S E P T E M B E R	18	The Puzzle of Human Skin	Ricky Lau, Xin Chengjiang	Gao Yunxiang, Xiong Naijin, Liu Yanyu, Ma Shaohua	Mystery / Thriller		
S E P T E M B E R	18	Tomb Mystery	Ning Jingwu	Lu Yulai, Tse Kwan-ho, Bryant Chang, Sarah Li, Peng Bo, Jeana Ho, Shi Shi, Zhang Lu, Du Yuming	Thriller		
S E P T E M B E R	25	Circle	You Song	Ai Liya, Pan Chen, Guo Yue, Liu Liyang, Wang Zengqi, Golden Zhang, Zhou Ran	Thriller		
S E P T E M B E R	25	Lost in Hong Kong	Xu Zheng	Xu Zheng, Zhao Wei, Bao Bei'er, Du Juan, Eric Kot, Sam Lee, Pan Hong, Zhao Youliang, Zhu Yuanyuan, Wang Xun, Fung Min-hun, Wong Jing, Bobby Yip, Jerry Lamb, Paul Che, Kingdom Yuen, Lam Suet, Johnnie Kong, Lawrence Cheng, Tin Kai-man, Richard Ng, Lin Ludi, Jim Chim, Jacquelin Chong, Tao Hong	Comedy		
S E P T E M B E R	25	The Mirror	Pakphum Wonjinda, Kim Sung-ho, Danny Pang	Oscar Sun, Jessie Zhou, Kim Eun-sung, Lee Chae-young	Thriller		
S E P T E M B E R	25	The Third Way of Love	John H. Lee	Liu Yifei, Song Seung-heon, OD, Jessie Chiang, Meng Jia	Romance		
S E P T E M B E R	26	CJ7: Super Q Team	William Kan	Xu Jiao, Shi Banyu, Lin Su, Hao Peng, Ma Yufei, Liu Cong, Guo Hao, Peng Bo, A Bu, Yu Lin, Wu Yitong, William Kan, Zhang Yan	Comedy / Animation / Family		
S E P T E M B E R	30	Chronicles of the Ghostly Tribe	Lu Chuan	Mark Chao, Yao Chen, Rhydian Vaughan, Li Chen, Tiffany Tang, Feng Li, Li Guangjie, Wang Qingxiang, Wu Jun, Wang Deshun	Action / Thriller / Adventure	Based on the novel Ghost Blows Out the Light	
S E P T E M B E R	30	Goodbye Mr. Loser	Yan Fei, Peng Damo	Shen Teng, Ma Li, Yin Zheng, Ai Lun, Wang Zi, Tian Yu, Song Yang, Chang Yuan, Li Ping, Lee Li-chun, Zhang Yiming	Comedy		
S E P T E M B E R	30	Saving Mr. Wu	Ding Sheng	Andy Lau, Liu Ye, Wu Ruofu, Wang Qianyuan, Lam Suet, Zhao Xiaorui, Li Meng, Cai Lu, Lu Peng	Drama / Crime	Entered into the 2015 Silk Road International Film Festival	

=== October–December ===
Opening		Title	Director	Cast	Genre	Notes	Ref.
O C T O B E R	1	A Tale From The Orient	Tsai Chih-chung, Daniel Tsai	Zhang Meijuan, Su Yu, Liu Liu, Zheng Lian, Gao Xudong, Sun Jinliang, Hao Junyue, Ma Yufei, Chen Dagang	Animation / Fantasy / Adventure		
O C T O B E R	1	Balala the Fairies: Princess Camellia	Chen Cheng	Akira Zhao, Dai Meng, Zhao Jinmai, Daisy Cakes, Xinel Simpson	Fantasy / Adventure		
O C T O B E R	1	Polar Adventure	Qiao Fang	Li Minyan, Li Ye, Yan Lizhen	Comedy / Animation / Adventure		
O C T O B E R	3	The Ghost House	Zhang Fan	Ambrose Hui, Wang Manling, Lu Shan, Liu Zhenjun, Lu Chuang, Law Kar-ying, Kingdom Yuen	Mystery / Thriller		
O C T O B E R	9	Eternal Promise of Love	Yun Shan	Pan Chen, Zheng Kai, Su Miaoling, Jin Feng, He Baolong, Wu Qi, Yang Chunrong, Gao Quansheng, Shao Shuai	Romance		
O C T O B E R	10	Mom, Let Me Love You Once Again	Sun Aiguo, Han Feng	Li Quanlin, Li Fengming, Qiu Lin, Han Feng, Wu Xiefeng, Liu Zhengyue, Pan Lingjia, Zhu Lei, Fu Meiling	Drama / Family		
O C T O B E R	10	Tiger Wife	Liu Ke	Yin Yitong, James Huang, Wang Wen, Chen Yao, Pan Yang, Chen Peishan, Du Xudong	Comedy / Romance		
O C T O B E R	16	Campus Mystery	Guan Er	You Leer, Chen Bingqiang, Yang Manyu, Tao Zui, Ye Sitong, Li Siwen, Chen Yuxing, Zheng Huixin	Thriller / Horror		
O C T O B E R	16	The Dangerous Affair	Wang Zeyan	Zhou Jie, Lawrence Ng, Cheng Qi, Guo Chao, Wang Yu, Jin Minqiang	Mystery / Thriller		
O C T O B E R	16	Deep in the Heart	Xin Yukun	Huo Weimin, Wang Xiaotian, Luo Yun, Sun Li, Shao Shengjie, Cao Xian, Jia Zhigang, Zhu Ziqing, Wang Zichen	Drama / Mystery / Crime	Entered into the 71st Venice International Film Festival	
O C T O B E R	16	Himalaya: Ladder to Paradise	Xiao Han, Liang Junjian	Suolang Duoji, Pubu Dunzhu, Gesang Yangzong, Cirenduo Bujie, Jia Bu	Documentary		
O C T O B E R	16	Magic Card	Keung Kwok-man	Qiao Renliang, Zhang Xinyu, Simon Yam, Bai Kainan, Maria Grazia Cucinotta, Dada Chan, Cai Yida, Yin Ying, Adriano Giannini, Wayne Zhang, Zhang Yishan, Jiang Luxia, He Zhonglin, Nie Yaliang, Zhu Guanghu	Comedy / Action / Romance		
O C T O B E R	17	Morengen Bear vs Man	Wang Pengcheng, Christopher	Zhang Li, Liu Juan, Wan Mengqi, Song Zheng, Zhang Beiwu, Liu Rong, Xu Wei, Fand Daiwei	Animation / Children		
O C T O B E R	23	Blind Spot	Danny Pang	Marc Ma, Wu Xin, Pan Yueming, Wang Jingchun, Monica Mok, Zhu Yuchen, Timmy Hung, Danny Chan Kwok-kwan	Mystery / Thriller		
O C T O B E R	23	River Road	Li Ruijun	Tang Long, Guo Songtao, Bai Wenxin, Guo Jianmin, Ma Xingchun	Drama	Entered into the 2014 Tokyo International Film Festival	
O C T O B E R	23	Romance Out of the Blue	Ning Ying	Xia Yu, Guan Xiaotong, Roy Chiu, Liu Zi, Cui Baoyue, Pax Congo, Zuo Li	Comedy / Romance		
O C T O B E R	23	Where's the Dragon?	Foo Sing-choong	Zhang Ziyi, Wang Leehom, Michael Wong, Fish Leong, Maggie Chiang, Leon Dai	Comedy / Animation	Mainland-Hong Kong co-production	
O C T O B E R	23	Youth Never Returns	Tian Meng	Hans Zhang, Joe Chen, Wang Xiaokun, Shi Yanfei, Guo Ziqian, Chen Yalan, Liao Juan, Cao Hanchao, Jia Shengqiang, Liu Ting, Lin Xiaofan, Wang Xun, Ni Jingyang, Hua Zhou	Romantic-comedy	Entered into the 2015 Shanghai International Film Festival	
O C T O B E R	27	The Promised Land	He Ping	Wang Jiajia, Zhang Yi, Wang Zhiwen, Liu Yiwei, Lei Han	Drama / Romance		
O C T O B E R	29	Happiness is Very Embarrassing	Ma Yong	Zhang Xiaojun, Zhang Xiai, Mu Yuhua, Yao Hongjun, Lu Xiaolu, Sun Zhan, Deng Yangning, Pei Yuchen, Lin Aixuan	Comedy / Romance / Family	Mainland-Taiwan co-production	
O C T O B E R	30	Age of Glory	Xu Geng	Dong Yong, Marc Ma, He Qiang, Guo Xiaoming, Yu Dongjiang, Gao Beibei	Drama		
O C T O B E R	30	Agent F.O.X.	Ge Shuiying	Qiao Shiyu, Yu Zhou, Zhang Yaohan, Shang Hong, Xuan Xiaoming, Chen Hao, Zhang Wei, Li Zhiwei	Animation / Fantasy / Adventure		
O C T O B E R	30	Hapless Thief	Ma Yuan	Wang Shuangbao, Zhao Chulun, Wang Peilu, Hao Tingting	Comedy / Crime		
O C T O B E R	30	Midnight Whisper	Jiu Jiu	Abby Yin, Guo Yunqi, Ni Musi, Song Jiahao, Han Feng, Wang Xiuhao, Chang Xiaoxiao	Thriller		
O C T O B E R	30	Mountains May Depart	Jia Zhangke	Zhao Tao, Zhang Yi, Liang Jingdong, Dong Zijian, Sylvia Chang, Rong Zishan, Liang Yonghao, Liu Lu, Yuan Wenqian	Drama / Family	Entered into the 2015 Cannes Film Festival	
O C T O B E R	30	Thru the Moebius Strip	Glenn Chaika	Jonathan Taylor Thomas, Chris Marquette, Mark Hamill, Michael Dorn, Andrea Leon, Peri Gilpin, Kellie Martin, Daniel Davis, Dee Bradley Baker, John DeMita, Kevin McDonald, James Romanovich, John DiMaggio	Science Fiction / Animation / Adventure	Entered into the 2005 Cannes Film Festival	
O C T O B E R	30	The Witness	Ahn Sang-hoon	Yang Mi, Lu Han, Wang Jingchun, Zhu Yawen, Liu Ruilin, Lai Yi	Drama / Mystery / Crime	Mainland-South Korea co-production	
N O V E M B E R	1	The Verse of Us	Wu Feiyue, Qin Xiaoyu	Wu Niaoniao, Lao Jing, Chen Nianxi, Wu Xia, Jike Ayou, Xu Lizhi	Documentary		
N O V E M B E R	3	My Virgin Land	Zhou Jun	Sun Qiang, Lv Jingjing, Zhang Yongqing, Sang Zongzhong	Drama		
N O V E M B E R	5	The Stormy Night	Liu Tianrong	Lan Yan, Daniella Wang, Dong Yufeng	Thriller		
N O V E M B E R	6	Ex-Files 2	Tian Yusheng	Zheng Kai, Amber Kuo, Wang Chuanjun, Zhang Dianlun, Zhang Yixing	Comedy / Romance	Mainland-Hong Kong co-production	
N O V E M B E R	6	Fight Up	Sun Lei	Wang Wei, Yan Luyang, Kenneth Tsang, Tang Qun, Cheng Zhen, Xia Mo, Chen Dongqing, Li Jingtao, Zhu Tao, Yu Lei, Song Chuang	War		
N O V E M B E R	6	The Last Women Standing	Luo Luo	Shu Qi, Eddie Peng, Pan Hong, Chin Shih-chieh, Xing Jiadong, Hao Lei, Lynn Hung	Drama / Romance	Based on the novel Queen Stain	
N O V E M B E R	6	A Time of Beauty	Wang Haifeng	Zhang Yan, An Ze, Huang Yan, He Yi, Wang Xu, Chen Ye	Drama		
N O V E M B E R	11	My Original Dream	Hao Jie	Bao Bei'er, Sun Yi, Feng Si	Drama / Romance	Entered into the 2015 Tokyo International Film Festival	
N O V E M B E R	13	Grudge Pix	Li Qingcheng	Wang Xianghong, Tong Xin, Tang Jiacheng, Yao Yuxin	Mystery / Thriller		
N O V E M B E R	13	Les Aventures d'Anthony	Janet Chun	Liu Chang, Bai Baihe, Tang Yixin, Congo Pax, Jin Shijia, Jiang Yiyan, Archie Kao, Bruce, Vivian Sung, Pan Hong, Yu Rongguang, Lisa Lu	Drama / Romance		
N O V E M B E R	13	This Is Me	Dai Rui	Michelle Chen, Zheng Kai, Bao Bei'er, Oscar Sun, Tang Yixin, Wang Yongqiang, Tracy Zhou, Tong Jian-kong, Deng Mei-en, Thomas Price	Comedy / Romance		
N O V E M B E R	14	Kunta	Li Lian	Di Feifei, Zhang Yunyi, Hong Haitian, Cheng Yuzhu, Leo Wu, Meng Xianglong	Comedy / Animation / Adventure		
N O V E M B E R	20	A Fool	Chen Jianbin	Chen Jianbin, Jiang Qinqin, Wang Xuebing, Jin Shijia	Drama / Comedy / Adventure	Entered into the 2014 Taipei Golden Horse Film Festival	
N O V E M B E R	20	Chasing Hemingway	Xu Cheng	Han Bo-reum, Gao Shuguang, Guo Peng, Liu Mingyang, Feng Jing, He Zhengjun, Rong Rong, Xue Xiaofeng, Zhu Lin	Romance		
N O V E M B E R	20	Chinese Horror Story	Bowie Lau	Zhu Yuchen, Shi Tianqi	Thriller / Horror		
N O V E M B E R	20	Gui Mi Xin Qiao	Hong Doo-hyun	Gina Jin, Jiang Chao, Zhu Xuan, Wang Meiren, Yang Dan, Qiu Lin, Duan Xiaohuan	Romance / Mystery / Thriller	Mainland-South Korea co-production	
N O V E M B E R	20	The King of Tibetan Antelope	Liu Yujun	Li Yang, Ju Ping, Wang Xuechun, Gao Mingjie	Comedy / Animation / Adventure		
N O V E M B E R	20	Lovely Devil	Lei Jinke	Wu Mingxuan, Zhao Tianci, Jin Guibin, Wang Yinqi, Wong Yat-fei, Song Aishan, Wei Yining	Comedy		
N O V E M B E R	20	Return of the Cuckoo	Patrick Kong	Julian Cheung, Charmaine Sheh, Nancy Sit, Joe Chen, Michael Tong, Helen Ma, Joyce Cheng	Drama / Romance	Mainland-Hong Kong co-production	
N O V E M B E R	24	Dream Come True	Rong Chuan	Yu Menglong, Zhang Yang, Xie Binbin, Ma Yingjie, Gu Jing, Li Zhengyu, Li Wunan, Feng Binqing	Drama / Romance		
N O V E M B E R	27	Bad Guys Always Die	Sun Hao	Chen Bolin, Son Ye-jin, Qiao Zhenyu, Shin Hyun-joon, Jang Gwang, Yang Xuwen, Ding Wenbo, Park Chul-min, Guan Xiaotong	Comedy / Action / Mystery / Crime	Mainland-Hong Kong co-production	
N O V E M B E R	27	Deception Obsession	Xiang Haiming, Ji Qiao	Sun Feifei, Li Tai, Shang Rong, Wang Yijia	Mystery / Thriller		
N O V E M B E R	27	Fruit Rockers	Wei Jian	Daniella Wang, David Chen, Chang Le, Chen Linsheng, Jia Kangxi, Xu Yi, Anastasiya Sedlkova, Wei Jian, Jing Bao, Jiang Xin	Comedy / Romance / Music		
N O V E M B E R	27	The Vanished Murderer	Law Chi-leung	Sean Lau, Gordon Lam, Li Xiaolu, Jiang Yiyan, Guo Xiaodong, Rhydian Vaughan	Action / Mystery / Crime	Mainland-Hong Kong co-production	
N O V E M B E R	30	The White Lie	Xiao Libo	Xi Meijuan, Fan Yulin, Chen Ying, Tian Muchen, Zhou Haodong, Mo Shini	Drama		
D E C E M B E R	3	Fall in Love Like a Star	Tony Chan	Yang Mi, Li Yifeng, Chen Shu, David Wang, Zhang Yunlong, Dilraba Dilmurat	Comedy / Romance		
D E C E M B E R	4	Go Lala Go 2	Andrew Chien	Vic Chou, Ariel Lin, Chen Bolin, Nana, Li Jiahang, Vivian Wu, Qiu Muhan	Comedy / Romance		
D E C E M B E R	4	Impossible	Sun Zhou	Wang Baoqiang, Xiaoshenyang, Da Peng, Yin Zheng, Cheng Yi, Xin Zhilei	Drama / Comedy / Sci-Fi		
D E C E M B E R	4	Oh My God	Wei Nan, Wei Min	Chen Xuedong, Zhang Yixing, Jiang Wen, Li Xiaolu, Ouyang Junwen, Zhang Yao, Yu Xiaowei, Chen Chusheng, Qin Shupei, Tiger Hu, Xing Yu, Batu Ying, Yao Miao, Zhang Ziyi, Huang Xiaowan	Comedy		
D E C E M B E R	8	The Right Way	Li Dong	Zhang You, Li Jingjing, Cao Shuai, Xu Chicheng	Drama / Romance		
D E C E M B E R	8	The War of Surrender	Zhou Qi, Ma Delin	Song Yu, Niu Jun, Huang Jingyi, Diao Chengyu, Ma Wenbo, Xu Leizhi, Li Xinyun, Scott Pruett, Sun Di, Ge Wenxi	Mystery / War		
D E C E M B E R	10	I'm A Super Star	Zhang Yifei	Liu Bo, Teng Fei, Ma Ruiman, Tan Hao, Gao Tian, Nie Shufeng	Comedy		
D E C E M B E R	10	The Master	Xu Haofeng	Liao Fan, Song Jia, Jiang Wenli, Chin Shih-chieh, Song Yang, Huang Jue, Madina Memet, Zhang Aoyue, Ma Jun, Chen Kuan-tai, Hung Yan-yan, Leon Dai	Drama / Action / Martial Arts	Entered into the 2015 Taipei Golden Horse Film Festival	
D E C E M B E R	10	Unmissable	Du Qiquan, Qi Zixuan	Zeng Hongchang, Lv Zhuoran, Cui Hang, Ma Li, Zhao Ran, Qie Lutong, Joan Zheng	Drama / Romance		
D E C E M B E R	11	An Accidental Shot of Love	Zhou Wei	Yu Entai, Ni Hongjie, Wang Jingchun, Zhao Wenqi, Li Rui, Siqin Gaowa, Cao Yunjin, Wu Yue, Roy Chiu, Zhong Sihua	Comedy / Romance		
D E C E M B E R	11	Cui Ming Fu	Zhou Xiaopeng	Zheng Qiang, Chen Weidong, Lu Enjie, Jiang Yiyi, Yu Menglong, Liu Zhenyou, Wang Gang, Li Yaojing	Mystery / Thriller		
D E C E M B E R	11	Dream Holiday	Wang Kaiyang, Zhang Junfu	Zhang Yaxi, Min Chunxiao, Li Yilin, Sun Di, Li Haoyu, Fang Congyi, Purba Rgyal, Oscar Qian, Yolanda Yang, Fu Mengni, Lisi Danni, Hannah Quinlivan, Zong Fengyan, Gui Gui	Romance		
D E C E M B E R	11	E-commerce Times	Ren Xiaoxi	Van Fan, Meng Peng, Fu Man, Deng Ning, Qu Tongyu	Drama / Comedy		
D E C E M B E R	11	Forever Love	An Zhanjun	Joe Chen, Li Baotian, Ma Yuan, Sun Yizhou, Chrissie Chau	Drama		
D E C E M B E R	11	North By Northeast	Zhang Bingjian	Ban Zan, Li Bin, Lai Jiatong, Zhan Hewen, Wu You, Liu Weibo, Chen Duan, Zhang You, Guo Hui	Drama / Comedy / Mystery	Entered into the 27th Tokyo International Film Festival	
D E C E M B E R	11	The Spring of My Life	Wu Na	Tan Songyun, Luo Yunxi	Romance	Entered into the 2014 Shanghai International Film Festival	
D E C E M B E R	11	Taste of Love	Miao Shu	Jill Hsu, Yuan Xiaochao, Yoo Seung-jun, Sammy Hung, Sammy Lau, Xiao Hong, Tan He, Zhou Xiaofei	Romance / Fantasy		
D E C E M B E R	12	Gulu Mermaid	Yang Guangfu	Stanley Wing, Jin Xiaomin	Comedy / Animation / Adventure		
D E C E M B E R	12	The Winner	Mao Dai	Baomu Zhongyang, A Jie, Xiao Liansha, Ding Dang, Teng Xin, Slayerboom	Comedy / Animation		
D E C E M B E R	18	The Doll	Liu Chongchong	Xu Dongmei, Zhang Xu, Yang Yang, Xie Yuan	Thriller / Horror		
D E C E M B E R	18	Mojin: The Lost Legend	Wuershan	Chen Kun, Huang Bo, Shu Qi, Angelababy, Xia Yu, Liu Xiaoqing, Cherry Ngan	Drama / Action / Fantasy / Adventure	Based on the novel Ghost Blows Out the Light	
D E C E M B E R	18	Surprise	Show Joy	White. K, Yang Zishan, Chen Bo-lin, Ma Tianyu, Liu Xunzimo, Mike Pirath Nitipaisankul, Show Joy, Eric Tsang, Winston Chao, Jia Ling, Kong Lianshun, Tong Liya, Qiao Renliang, Liu Hao, Zhang Benyu, Gabriella Ge, Ke Da, Zhao Yingjun	Comedy / Fantasy / Adventure / Costume		
D E C E M B E R	24	Devil and Angel	Yu Baimei, Deng Chao	Deng Chao, Sun Li, Dai Lele, Liang Chao, Yang Xinming, Wang Yanhui	Comedy		
D E C E M B E R	24	Mr. Six	Guan Hu	Feng Xiaogang, Xu Qing, Zhang Hanyu, Liu Hua, Li Yifeng, Kris Wu, Liang Jing, Congo Pax, Yu Hewei, Lian Yiming, Shang Yuxian, Zhang Yi, Zhang Yishan, Ning Hao, Wang Junkai, Roy Wang, Jackson Yi	Drama / Action / Crime	Entered into the 72nd Venice International Film Festival	
D E C E M B E R	24	Youth is a War	Zhang Lei, Chen Yingdi	Li Yufu, Yan Weixiang, Gao Lin, Wei Chengcai, Wang Xiu, Luo Chuncui, Chen Yingdi, Lu Houmi, Liu Faming	Drama / Comedy / Romance		
D E C E M B E R	31	Detective Chinatown	Chen Sicheng	Wang Baoqiang, Liu Haoran, Tong Liya, Chen He, Xiao Yang, Xiaoshenyang, Pan Yueming, Marc Ma, Zhang Zifeng, Zhao Yingjun, Sang Ping, Chin Shih-chieh	Comedy / Mystery		
D E C E M B E R	31	Heart for Heaven	Zhang Cheng	Shen Teng, Ma Li, Du Xiaoyu, Lam Suet, Wang Zizi, Marc, Su Zhidan, Xu Ruoqi, Qi Haiyang	Comedy		
D E C E M B E R	31	Massagist	Taweewat Wantha	Bowie Lam, Yuan Baizihui, Jack Kao, Wesley Wong, Niu Weiqi, Gao Xiang, Ye Yong	Mystery / Thriller	Mainland-Thailand co-production	
D E C E M B E R	31	The Prospector	Chen Xingchi	Lawrence Ng, Guo Zhenni, Zhang Yuehan, Alex Shi, Mao Fangyuan, Yu Xiang, Chen Xu, Wang Taotao, Dong Jinping, Jiang Haiyan, Luo Sang, Sina Quzhui, Fu Chuanjie, Cao Yu, Tao Liang, Li Guohong	Drama / Adventure		

== See also ==
- List of Chinese films of 2014
- List of Chinese films of 2016
