= Rock Hero =

- Poster
- 摇滚英雄
- Directed by: Tan Hua
- Screenplay by: Tan Hua
- Produced by: Chen Si; Annie Yi
- Starring: Eric Qin; Vivien Li; Cya Liu; Durizhaorigetu; Ma Kaiman; Li Qingyun; Wang Chenhao; Li Xinran
- Cinematography: Ma Jian
- Edited by: Tan Hua
- Production companies: Beijing Goodtime Studio; Sichuan Yijingtiandi Culture & Media
- Release dates: 14 June 2015 (SIFF); 20 June 2015 (China)
- Country: China
- Language: Mandarin
- Box office: CN¥1.8 million

Rock Hero (Chinese: 摇滚英雄) is a 2015 Chinese drama film directed by Tan Hua. It was released on 20 June 2015.

== Cast ==
- Eric Qin as Wu Wei
- Vivien Li as Li Ai
- Cya Liu as Jiang Chunxiao
- Durizhaorigetu as Haili
- Ma Kaiman as Jiang Qian
- Li Qingyun as Zuo Jian
- Wang Chenhao as Xiaoman
- Li Xinran as Rong

== Reception ==
=== Box office ===
The film earned CN¥1.805 million at the Chinese box office.

=== Critical response ===
Derek Elley of Film Business Asia gave the film a 6 out of 10, calling it a "well played, though thinly plotted, look back at China's rock scene of the '90s."
