= Money game =

A money game is a game (in the sport or pastime sense) upon which one is gambling.

Money Game may refer to:

- Money Game (The Price Is Right), one of many pricing game challenges on the US game show The Price is Right
- Money Game (film), a 2015 Chinese comedy film
- The Money Game, a 1988 video game for the Nintendo Family Computer
- The Money Game, a 1968 bestselling book by George Goodman
- A Ponzi scheme, a form of fraud
- Money Game (TV series), a 2020 South Korean television series
