= Beyond the Clouds =

Beyond the Clouds may refer to:

- Beyond the Clouds (1995 film), a 1995 French film directed by Michelangelo Antonioni and Wim Wenders
- Beyond the Clouds (2017 film), an Indian Hindi-language film by Majid Majidi
- Beyond the Clouds (2023 film), a Chinese biographical film
- Beyond the Clouds (TV series), a 2014 South Korean television series
- The Place Promised in Our Early Days or Beyond the Clouds, a 2004 90-minute Japanese anime film directed by Makoto Shinkai
