= Crystal Zhang =

Crystal Zhang may refer to:

- Zhang Tian'ai (born 1988), Chinese actress
- Zhang Xiyuan (born 1989), Chinese actress
