= Love in the 1980s =

- Poster
- 1980年代的愛情
- Directed by: Huo Jianqi
- Screenplay by: Zheng Shiping; Chen Yong
- Based on: a novel by Ye Fu (Zheng Shiping)
- Produced by: Chen Yi
- Starring: Yang Caiyu; Lu Fangsheng; Li Shutong
- Cinematography: Shi Luan
- Edited by: Yan Tao
- Music by: Valley Children; Xiao Juan
- Production companies: Lichuan Longchuandiao Film & TV; Enbili (Shanghai) Investment Consulting
- Release dates: June 16, 2015 (SIFF); September 11, 2015 (China)
- Running time: 104 minutes
- Country: China
- Language: Mandarin
- Box office: CN¥1.75 million

Love in the 1980s (Chinese: 1980年代的愛情) is a 2015 Chinese period romance film directed by Huo Jianqi and based on a novel by Ye Fu. It was released on September 11, 2015.

== Cast ==
- Yang Caiyu as Cheng Liwen
- Lu Fangsheng as Guan Yubo
- Li Shutong as Xiang Yu'e

== Plot ==
Yubo (Lu Fangsheng) has just graduated from university and been assigned to work in a small village in his home province. Here he meets Liwen (Yang Caiyu), who was his high school classmate (and desk mate), and with whom he was in love. He spends the next six months pursuing her, yet despite the obvious attraction and chemistry between them, she rejects his love (again) out of fear that she will hold him back in his career. The back story of political purges causes her to repress her feelings for him. Years later, Yubo runs into Liwen again at their high school reunion. He gets drunk and she agrees to stay with him overnight to take care of him. After they sleep together, she rejects his proposal of love a third time, telling him that he belongs on the road. Another few years pass, and this time when he goes to visit her he learns that she has just died after a brief unhappy marriage to a truck driver. Yubo ends up adopting and raising her daughter.

== Reception ==
=== Box office ===
The film earned CN¥1.754 million at the Chinese box office.

=== Critical response ===
Derek Elley of Film Business Asia gave the film a 4 out of 10, saying that "the scenery scores over the human drama".
