= Li Jing (actor) =

Chinese comedian and xiangsheng actor (born 1978)

- Born: 1978 (age 47–48)
- Occupations: comedian, actor

Li Jing (Chinese: 李菁; born 1978) is a Chinese comedian and xiangsheng actress. She, along with Guo Degang and Zhang Wenshun, founded the popular xiangsheng group Deyunshe. She has also appeared in many films.

== Filmography ==
- Mr. & Mrs. Incredible (2011)
- House Mania (2011)
- A Chinese Ghost Story (2011)
- Just Try Me (2012)
- Drug War (2013)
- The Monkey King (2014)
- Lock Me Up, Tie Him Down (2014)
- Stealing Legend (2014)
- The House That Never Dies (2014)
- Night of Adventure (2014)
- Break (2014)
- Emperor's Holidays (2015)
- Love Without Distance (2015)
- The Road (2015)
- Devil's Vendetta (2019)
- Devil's Vendetta 2 (2019)
