= 2015 Shanghai International Film Festival =

Chinese film festival

- Opening film: I Am Somebody
- Location: Shanghai, China
- Awards: Golden Goblet
- No. of films: more than 200
- Website: http://www.siff.com

Shanghai International Film Festival chronology
- 2016 2014

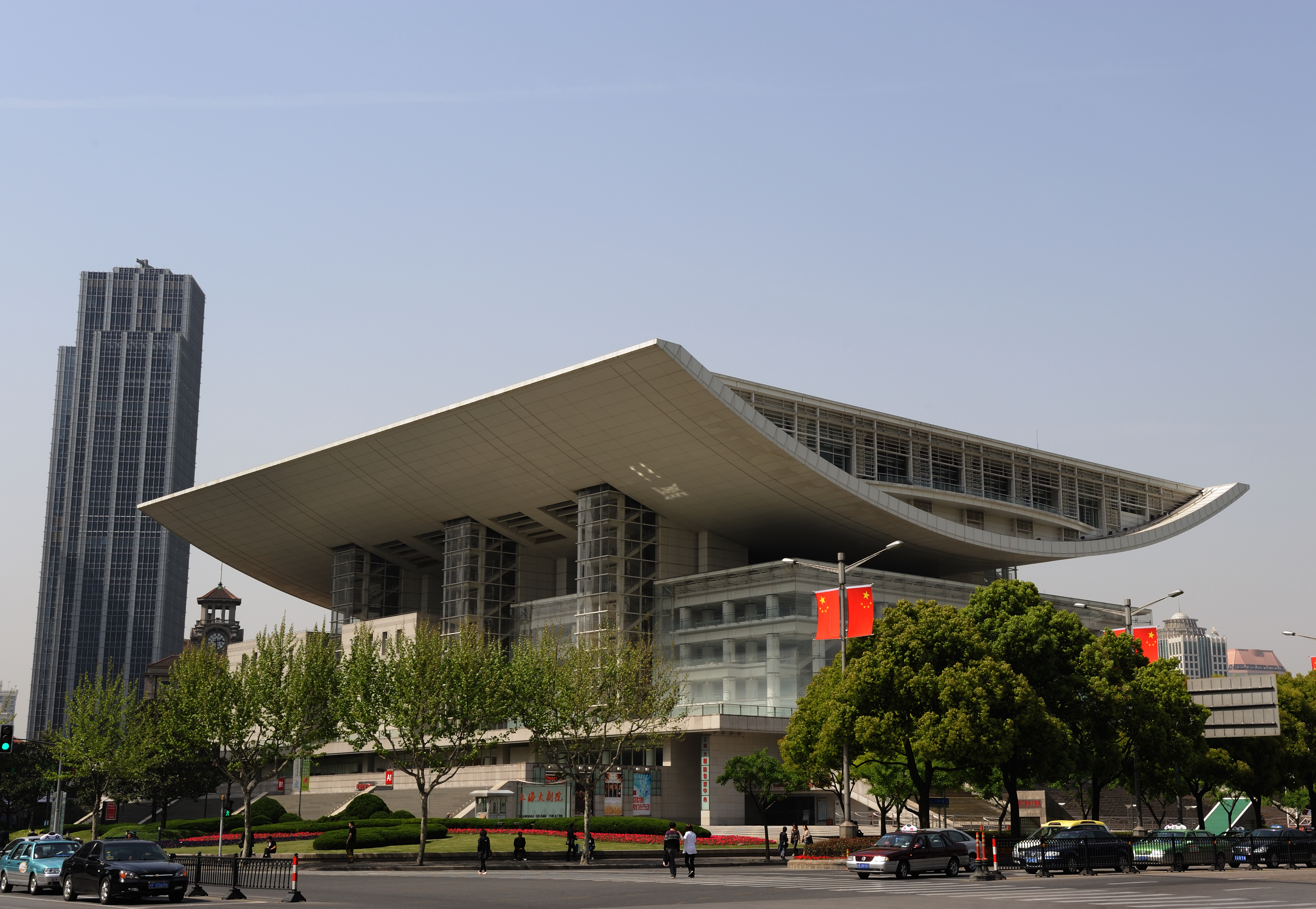
Shanghai Grand Theater

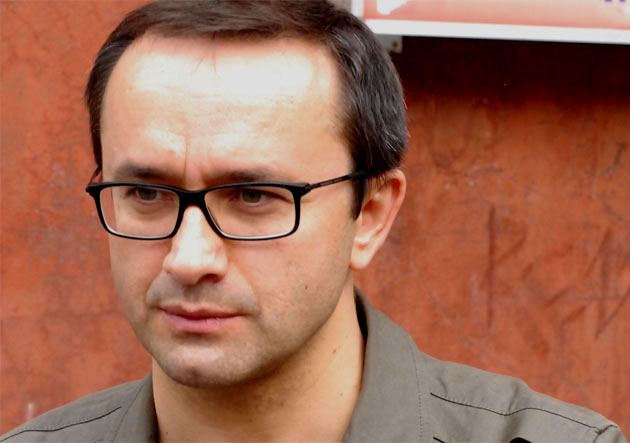
Andrey Zvyagintsev, president of the jury for the Golden Goblet Award

The 2015 Shanghai International Film Festival was the 18th such festival devoted to international cinema held in Shanghai, China. The opening film was I Am Somebody, written and directed by Derek Yee.

== International Jury ==
The members of the jury for the Golden Goblet Award were:

- Andrey Zvyagintsev (Russian film director and actor; president of the jury)

== Winners ==
=== Golden Goblet Awards ===
- Best Feature Film: The Night Watchman
- Jury Grand Prix: Carte Blanche
- Best Director: Cao Baoping for The Dead End
- Best Actor: Deng Chao, Duan Yihong and Guo Tao for The Dead End
- Best Actress: Krista Kosonen for Wildeye
- Best Screenplay: Cake
- Best Cinematography: Sunstroke
- Best Music:
- Best Documentary: The Verse of Us
- Best Animated Film: Song of the Sea
- Outstanding Film Artistic Contribution: Oh Seung-wook for The Shameless

=== Asian New Talent Award ===
- Best Film: 13
- Best Director: Momoko Andō for 0.5 mm
- Best Scriptwriter: Siti
- Best Actor: Huang Yuan for (Sex) Appeal
- Best Actress: Yangchan Lhamo for River
- Best Cinematography: 13

=== China Movie Channel Media Award ===
- Best Director: Xu Ang for 12 Citizens
- Best Scriptwriter: 12 Citizens
- Best Actor: He Bing for 12 Citizens
- Best Actress: Yang Zishan for 20 Once Again
- Best Supporting Actor: Han Tongsheng for 12 Citizens
- Best Supporting Actress: Chen Jin for Nezha
- Best New Director: Da Peng for Jian Bing Man
- Best New Actor: Da Peng for Jian Bing Man
- Best New Actress: Li Haofei for Nezha
- Special Jury Award: Wolf Warriors, Crazy New Year's Eve

=== Others ===
- Lifetime Achievement Award: Xia Meng
