= Ge Tian =

Chinese actress and model

- 葛天
- Born: 25 December 1988 (age 37); Jinan, Shandong, China
- Education: Central Academy of Drama
- Occupations: Fashion model, actress
- Years active: 2005 - present
- Agent: Beijing Poly Agency
- Notable work: Nowhere to Run
- Spouse: Liu Xiang (m. 2014; div. 2015)
- Parent: Mother: Tang Lingling

Ge Tian (Chinese: 葛天; pinyin: Gě Tiān; born 25 December 1988) is a Chinese actress and fashion model.

== Biography ==
=== Early life ===
Ge Tian was born in Jinan, Shandong, on December 25, 1988. In 2012 she graduated from Central Academy of Drama, majoring in acting.

=== Acting career ===
Ge Tian began her career as a fashion model in 2005. A year later, she has become the first official tourism ambassador of Shandong province.

In 2011, Ge Tian played Thierry Mena in William Mesguich's drama The Cynic, based on Molière's novel.

After college, she appeared in many television series and films, such as One Mile Above, The VI Group of Fatal Case, and Leaves in Changan.

In 2012, she starred in the romantic comedy television series Youth Explosion, alongside Lei Qingyao, Wang Chuang, and Chu Nan.

Ge Tian first rose to prominence in 2015 for playing Yin Hua in the historical television series Anti Japanese Together. The series received mixed reviews. That same year, she starred in the suspense thriller film Nowhere to Run with Zhang Duo, Liu Ying, and Sui Yongliang.

== Personal life ==
On September 8, 2014, Ge Tian married former Olympic hurdler Liu Xiang, one of China's best-known athletes. They divorced on June 25, 2015, after nine months and seventeen days of marriage.

== Works ==
=== Film ===
Year	Title	Chinese Title	Role	Notes
2010	One Mile Above	《转山》	Judy	
2012	Watch the Future	《守望未来》	Liang Na	
2015	Nowhere to Run	《封门诡影》	Yu Man	
2019	Super Captain			
2019	Invisible Tattoo			

=== Television ===
Year	Title	Chinese Title	Role	Notes
2010	The VI Group of Fatal Case	《重案六组》	Ou Lihua	
2010	Leaves in Changan	《叶落长安》		
2012	Youth Explosion	《青春大爆炸》	Susan	
2012	The Garrison in Xinjiang	《屯戍西疆》	Li Shan	
2014	Hero of Expedition	《剿匪英雄》	Zhu Yeqing	
