= Mid-July Days 2 =

2016 film by Li Hong Jian

- Poster
- Chinese: 七月半2：前世今生
- Directed by: Li Hong Jian
- Production companies: Beijing Zhongying Chuanqi Media 上海君画文化传播有限公司; Ningxia Jintuolu Media; Beijing Zhongchi Yingxiang Investment Fund Management; Beijing Hanlin Huazhe Entertainment; Yunhaiji (Beijing) Media; Beijing Gushe International Media
- Distributed by: Beijing G-POINT Film Culture Media
- Release date: August 19, 2016
- Running time: 93 minutes
- Country: China
- Language: Mandarin
- Box office: CN¥3.5 million

Mid-July Days 2 is a 2016 Chinese horror thriller film directed by Li Hong Jian and the second film in the Mid-July Days film series, following 2015's Mid-July Days. It was released in China on August 19, 2016.

== Cast ==
- Chen Meixing
- Zhai Zimo
- Luo Xiang
- Wang Liang
- Zhao Ji
- Miao Qing
- Xia Xingling
- Chang Yiran
- Fu Man
- Zhang Lifei
- Zeng Yilian

== Reception ==
The film has grossed CN¥3.5 million at the Chinese box office.
