= Zhang Guimei =

Chinese educator

- 张桂梅
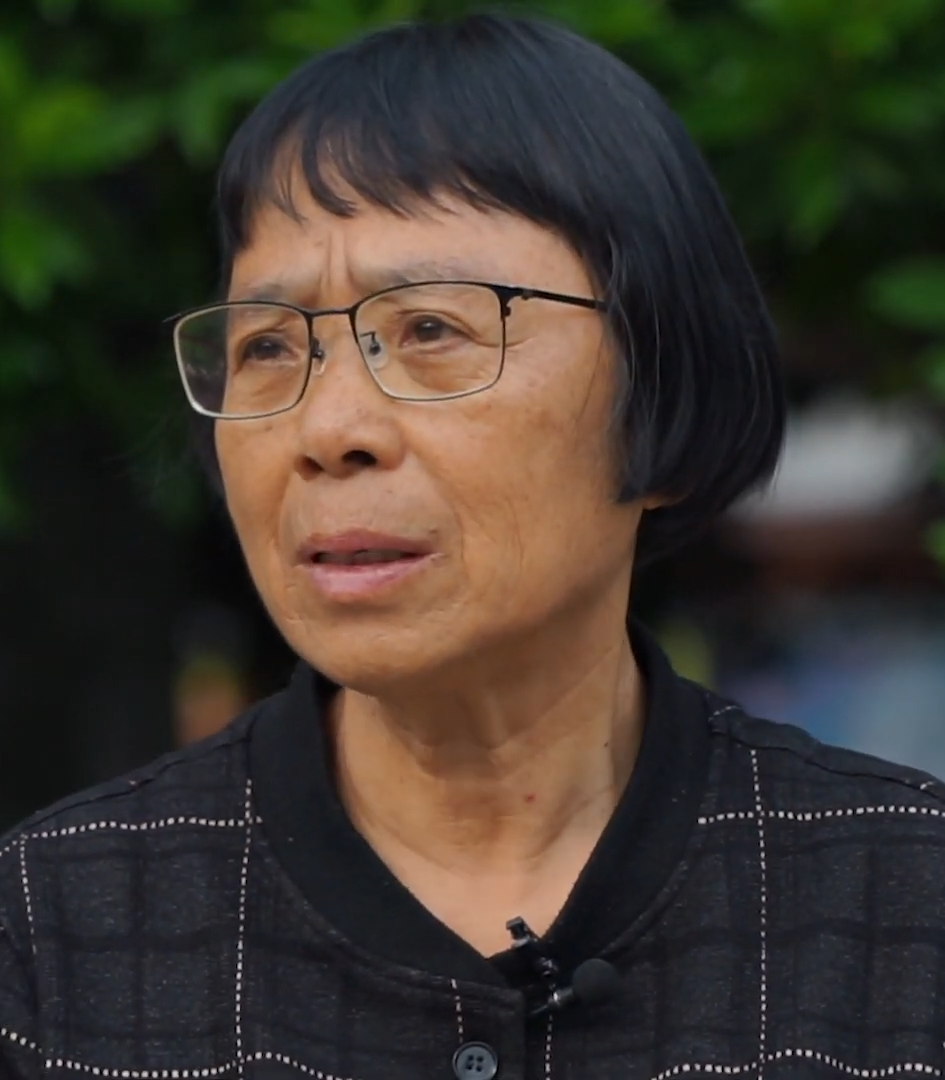
- Zhang in 2022

Principal of Huaping High School for Girls
- Incumbent
- Assumed office August 2008
- Preceded by: New title

Personal details
- Born: 15 June 1957 (age 69) Mudanjiang, Heilongjiang, China
- Party: Chinese Communist Party
- Spouse: Dong Yuhan (m. 1990; died 1994)
- Education: Lijiang Institute of Education
- Awards: July 1 Medal (2021)

Chinese name
- Simplified Chinese: 张桂梅
- Traditional Chinese: 張桂梅
Transcriptions
Standard Mandarin
- Hanyu Pinyin: Zhāng Guìméi

Zhang Guimei (Chinese: 张桂梅; born 15 June 1957) is a Chinese educator who is the founder and principal of Huaping High School for Girls, China's first and only free public high school for girls – in a poor, mountainous region in southwest China's Yunnan. She devoted her life to improving female education in China. She is of Manchu ethnicity. She is also the director of Huaping Children's Home, the orphanage in Huaping County. She is known for founding the Huaping High School for Girls, a free public high school have trained 1,804 poor girls to universities and rewrote their fate. She is a member of the Chinese Communist Party (CCP). She is a delegate to the 17th, 18th, 19th, and the 20th National Congress of the Chinese Communist Party. She is Secretary of the Party Branch and Principal of the Huaping Girls' Senior High School in Lijiang, South Province, and Director of the Children's Welfare Center in Huaping County. In October 2023, she was elected as one of the vice presidents of All-China Women's Federation's national committee.

== Early life ==
Zhang Guimei was born into a family of ethnic Manchu minority group in Mudanjiang, Heilongjiang, on 15 June 1957, while her ancestral home is in Xiuyan Manchu Autonomous County, Liaoning. She later changed her name to Zhang Jiamei. She is the twelfth child in her family. Because of the hard conditions her family faced, only six children in her family survived. Her mother died of illness in her childhood. Her father died when she was 17. Then, she went to Yunnan province with her sister. She took the college entrance examination of China, Gao Kao, four times for multiple reasons, including financial issues, loss of important legal documents, and performance stress.

== Career in Yunnan ==
In October 1974, the 17-year-old Zhang Guimei followed her sister to participate in the "Third Front" to Zhongdian County (now Shangri-La City) in southwest China's Yunnan. In December of the next year, she entered the workforce and became a staff member of Zhongdian County Forestry Bureau.

Later, Zhang was admitted to Lijiang Institute of Education (now Lijiang Normal College). After graduation, she worked as a front-line administrator in the forestry system and met her husband through introduction. She moved to the Forestry Children's School in Dali Bai Autonomous Prefecture (now Xizhou No.1 High School) with her husband, and her husband was made the principal. In 1993, her husband was diagnosed with advanced stomach cancer. Her husband died in 1994, leaving her childless. In August 1996, she decided to leave the place with which she was too familiar and applied to teach in Huaping County National Middle School in Lijiang, where she was promoted to head teacher of the Third Class due to her excellent work. In the same year, she was diagnosed with uterine fibroids. After hearing the news, members of the Huaping Women's Federation and the Chinese People's Political Consultative Conference donated money to her for treatment. In order to thank the local people, she decided to repay it with her whole life. In April 1998, she joined the CCP. In 2001, the Huaping Children's Home, where orphans were adopted, was established, and she was appointed as director.

=== Principal of Huaping High School for Girls ===
A girl can influence the next three generations. An educated and responsible mother will never let their children drop out of school. My Goal is to prevent poverty from passing down from generation to generation.

— Zhang Guimei,

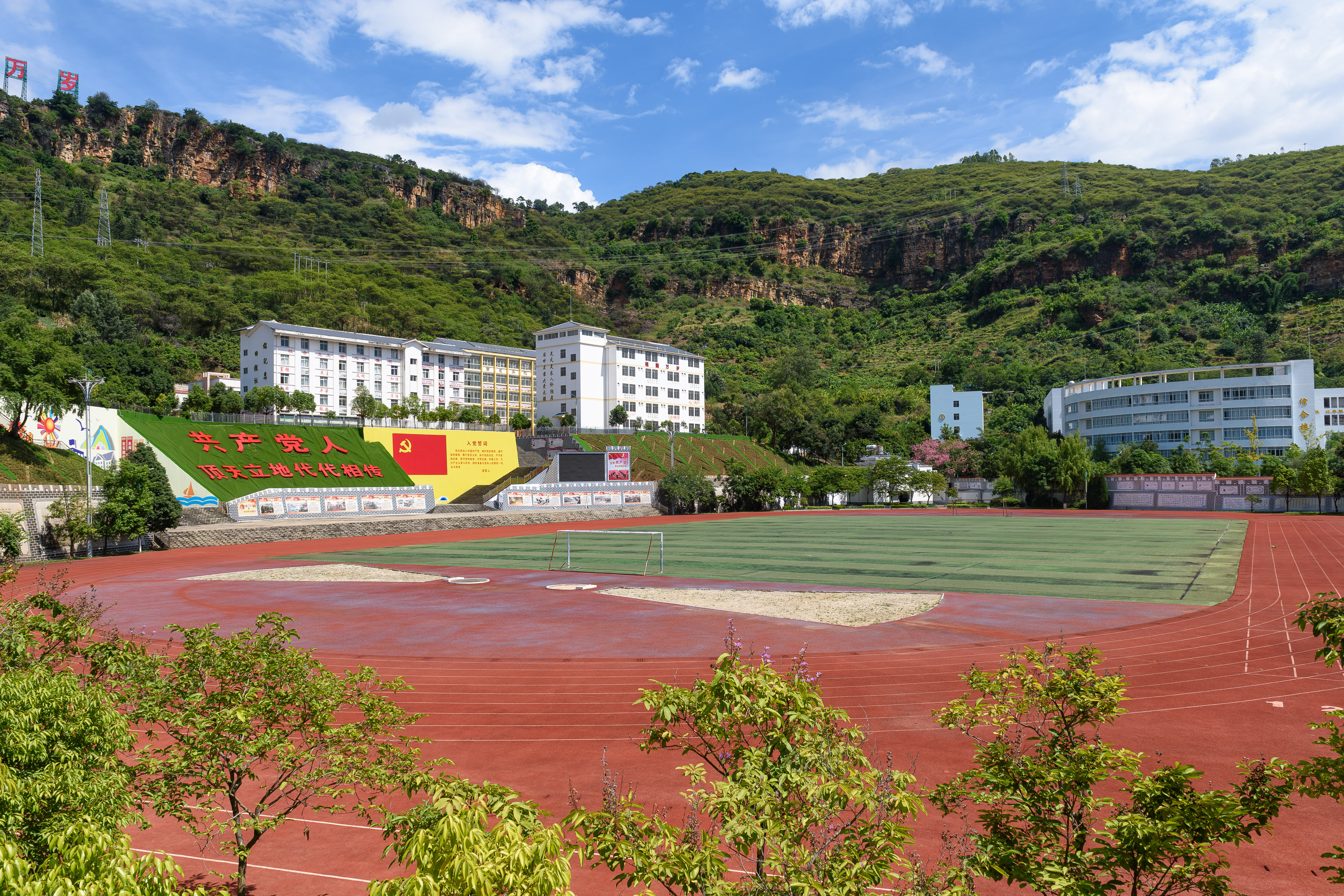
The Huaping High School for Girls in 2023

When Zhang taught in Huaping County, she came across "many girls that just disappeared before they finishing their studies". After inquiring, she learned that some of them were forced to work and others to get married at a young age. Since then, she decided to change it.

To raise money for establishing a school, between 2002 and 2007, Zhang spent the summer and winter vacations on the streets in the provincial capital city Kunming, asking people to donate. Many people refused to donate and humiliated her, and she only managed to collect about 10,000 yuan (about $1,415), which was nowhere near enough to start a school. In 2007, she became a delegate to the 17th National Congress of the CCP. When she attended CCP meetings in Beijing, a reporter reported her story and her dream to start a school for girls have drawn attention from the public. Within a short time, the governments of Lijiang and Huaping County allocated one million yuan for her, and she also received financial support from various organizations and warmhearted people in different regions. In August 2008, Zhang founded the Huaping High School for Girls, a free high school so that poor girls living in the mountains can get an education. In order to prevent the poor girls from losing the opportunity to study due to poverty, she stipulated that tuition and accommodation fees are all free.

In 2011, the students participated in the college entrance examination, with 69 undergraduates online, with a comprehensive online rate of 100%. Since that year, the comprehensive online rate of college entrance examination has been 100%, and the online rate of key universities has increased from 4.26% in 11 years to 40.67% in 19 years, ranking the first in Lijiang. Over the past 12 years, this high school has graduated a total of 10 classes of students, from which 1,804 girls from impoverished areas entered their dream universities. Some of these children have entered China's top universities, such as Sichuan University, Xiamen University, Wuhan University, Zhejiang University, and so on. Zhang Jiamei provided these girls the opportunities to achieve their dreams and change their social status.

== Personal life ==
In 1990, she married Dong Yuhan, an ethnic Bai man. Dong died from stomach cancer in 1994, leaving her childless.

Zhang suffers from 23 diseases, including osteoma and emphysema. She has a tight schedule every day, getting up at 5 am and going to bed at 12:30 am.

== In popular culture ==
=== TV programs ===
Television	English title	Chinese title	Notes
Phoenix Television	She De: Headmistress in Mountains	舍得（大山里的女校长）	
CCTV-13	One on One (Zhang Guimei: the Girls' School in Mountains)	面对面（张桂梅：大山里的女校）	
Yunnan Television	Teacher and Mother	教师妈妈	
Yunnan Television	Award Ceremony of the Title of "Yunling Model"	云岭楷模颁奖盛典	
CCTV-13	Award Ceremony of the Title of "Moving China Person of 2020"	感动中国2020年度人物颁奖盛典	

=== Films ===
- Beyond the Clouds (2023)

== Honours and awards ==
- 2006 Xingdian Talent Award by the CCP Yunnan Province Committee
- 2019 "List of Good China Man" by the Office of the Central Spiritual Civilization Construction Steering Committee
- 2020 "National Excellent Teachers" by the Ministry of Education of the People's Republic of China
- 2020 Title of "Yunling Model" by the CCP Yunnan Province Committee
- 2020 Title of "National March-eighth Red-banner Pacesetter" by the All-China Women's Federation
- December 2020 National Outstanding Communist Party Members by the Organization Department of the Chinese Communist Party
- 2021 Title of "Moving China Person of 2020" by the China Media Group
- 2021 July 1 Medal by the Central Committee of the Chinese Communist Party

Educational offices
New title	Principal of Huaping High School for Girls; 2008–present	Incumbent
