= Xinnian Is Coming – Uproar of Chuxi =

- 新年来啦之大闹除夕
- Directed by: Yu Mingliang; Yang Xiaojun; Liang Donglong
- Production companies: Tianjin Binhai Xinqu Guoshi Jingwei Media Co., Ltd; Beijing Guoshi Jingwei Science And Technology Co., Ltd; Lasai Guoshi Jingwei Media Co., Ltd; Chengdu Guoshi Jingwei Media Co., Ltd; Tibet Audio-Video Publishing House
- Distributed by: Beijing Guoshi Jingwei Science And Technology Co., Ltd
- Release date: 19 February 2015
- Running time: 80 minutes
- Country: China
- Language: Mandarin
- Box office: CN¥210,000

Xinnian is Coming – Uproar of Chuxi (Chinese: 新年来啦之大闹除夕) is a 2015 Chinese animated fantasy adventure film directed by Yu Mingliang, Yang Xiaojun and Liang Donglong. The film was released on 19 February 2015.

== Voice cast ==
- Zhao Shuting
- Fu Jie
- Yi Xiaoyin
- Chen Zhao
- Liang Xiaoqiang
- Ma Yufei
- Gong Dafang
- Li Mi
- Zhu Xiaoni

== Reception ==
By February 19, the film has earned CN¥210,000 at the Chinese box office.
