= Emperor's Holidays =

- Directed by: Wang Yuelun
- Starring: Guo Tao; Jimmy Lin; Zhang Liang; Wang Yuelun; Tian Liang; Kim Jeong-hoon
- Release date: February 19, 2015
- Running time: 108 minutes
- Country: China
- Language: Mandarin
- Box office: US$18.4 million (China)

Emperor's Holidays (Chinese: 爸爸的假期) is a 2015 Chinese family film directed by Wang Yuelun. The film was released on February 19, 2015.

== Cast ==
- Guo Tao
- Jimmy Lin
- Zhang Liang
- Wang Yuelun
- Tian Liang
- Sung Dong-il
- Kim Jeong-hoon
- Jang Gwang
- Jeong Kyeong-ho
- Sung Joon
- Sung Bin
- Angela Wang
- Kimi Lin
- Zhang Yuexuan
- Patrick Guo
- Li Jing
- Sha Yi
- Wang Taili
- Mike Sui
- Zhang Beibei
