= On Line (2015 film) =

- 时光大战
- Directed by: Li Changxin
- Production companies: Beijing Zhongyi Yingxiang International Media Co., Ltd
- Distributed by: Beijing G-POINT Film Culture Media Co., Ltd.
- Release date: January 30, 2015
- Running time: 90 minutes
- Country: China
- Language: Mandarin
- Box office: CN¥160,000

On Line (Chinese: 时光大战) is a 2015 Chinese science fiction action film directed by Li Changxin. It was released on January 30, 2015.

== Cast ==
- Liu Mengmeng
- Li Ning
- Kang Enhe
- Zhang Weixun
- Luo Guangmin
- Tong Yang
- Du Yifei

== Reception ==
By January 30, the film had earned CN¥160,000 at the Chinese box office.
