= Taste of China =

2015 Chinese documentary film

- 味道中国
- Directed by: Huang Yinghao; Zhang Wei; Wang Bing; Jin Ying
- Production companies: DocuChina.Co.Ltd; SMG Pictures
- Release date: 23 January 2015
- Running time: 86 minutes
- Country: China
- Language: Mandarin
- Box office: CN¥150,000

Taste of China (Chinese: 味道中国) is a 2015 Chinese documentary film directed by Huang Yinghao, Zhang Wei, Wang Bing and Jin Ying. It was released on 23 January 2015.

== Cast ==
- Yang Zhenhua
- Chen Hanzong
- Chen Junfan
- Mao Xiejun
- You Qiang

== Reception ==
By January 23, the film had earned CN¥150,000 at the Chinese box office.
