= 12 Citizens =

- 十二公民
- Directed by: Xu Ang (徐昂)
- Written by: Jinglong Han (韩景龙); Yujiao Li (李玉娇)
- Based on: Twelve Angry Men by Reginald Rose
- Produced by: Yan Jianwei (严建伟); Liangwen Li (李良文); Yang Ming (杨明); Luna Wang (王露娜)
- Cinematography: Tao Cai (陶彩)
- Edited by: Wang Gang (王刚); Jiale Yin (尹佳乐)
- Music by: Radio Mars
- Release dates: October 19, 2014 (Rome); May 15, 2015 (China)
- Running time: 106 minutes
- Country: China
- Language: Mandarin
- Box office: CN¥2.07 million (China)

12 Citizens (Chinese: 十二公民) is a 2014 Chinese suspense crime drama film directed by Xu Ang. It was shown at the 2014 Rome Film Festival on October 19, 2014 and was released in China on May 15, 2015. The plot is based on and heavily references the plot of the 1954 teleplay Twelve Angry Men by Reginald Rose. Various localization changes were made, such as changing the original, everyman protagonist into a Prosecutor of the Chinese Communist Party.

== Plot ==
On a hot summer's day, 12 male "citizens" undergo a mock jury for a law school's Western law subject. The mock jury need to decide whether a boy is guilty or not of a murder of his father with a knife based on the evidence. The evidence prepared by the students of the course seems airtight and therefore it seems as if the jury will render him guilty of the crime.

However, one juror does not follow the consensus and appreciates the nuances and seriousness of the verdict. His motives are unclear but he wants to entertain the thought that there is reasonable doubt about the guilt of the boy. As a result, the evidence is slowly cross-referenced and examined. Conflicts are spurred as a result of their differing personalities and strong opinions. Eventually, one by one, the jurors are convinced that there is reasonable doubt and judge the boy to be not guilty.

On the end of the mock jury trial, the jurors are visibly exhausted. The juror who had rebelled and wanted to see the case through is revealed to be a prosecutor of the People's Republic of China. The final credits note that the actual perpetrator was arrested a month later.

== Cast ==
Actor	Actor (Pinyin)	Role
何冰	He Bing	Juror no.8, the main character
雷佳	Lei Jia	Juror no.1, the foreman
王刚	Wang Gang	Juror no.2, a teacher
韩童生	Han Tongsheng	Juror no.3, a taxi driver
赵春羊	Zhao Chunyang	Juror no.4, a real estate owner
高东平	Gao Dongping	Juror no.5
李光复	Li Guangfu	Juror no.6, a physician
钱波	Qian Bo	Juror no.7, a shop owner
米铁增	Mi Tiezen	Juror no.9, the elder
张永强	Zhang Yongqiang	Juror no.10, a landlord
班赞	Ban Zan	Juror no.11, a security guard
刘辉	Liu Hui	Juror no.12, an insurance salesman

== Reception ==
By May 16, 2015 the film had grossed CN¥2.07 million at the Chinese box office.

On Film Business Asia, Derek Elley gave the film a 9 out of 10, saying it "is superbly written and played."

In The Hollywood Reporter, Deborah Young comments on the ending of the movie, stating that "one can take issue with the glib final revelation about Juror No. 8, which rather explodes the film's progressive democracy-by-the-people facade".
