= Mr. Deng Goes to Washington =

- Traditional Chinese: 旋風九日
- Simplified Chinese: 旋风九日
- Hanyu Pinyin: Xuànfēng Jiǔrì
- Directed by: Fu Hongxing
- Written by: Fu Hongxing
- Produced by: Lü Muzi
- Starring: Deng Xiaoping; Jimmy Carter; Henry Kissinger; Zbigniew Brzezinski; Rina Sa; Chan Tin-suen
- Production companies: New Oriental Education and Technology Group Inc
- Release date: 15 May 2015
- Running time: 90 minutes
- Country: China
- Languages: Mandarin; English

Mr. Deng Goes to Washington is a 2015 Chinese historical documentary film written and directed by Fu Hongxing, starring Deng Xiaoping, Jimmy Carter, Henry Kissinger, Zbigniew Brzezinski, Rina Sa, and Chan Tin-suen. The film picks up the story of Chinese leader Deng Xiaoping's nine-day official visit to the US in 1979. The film was released on 15 May 2015 to commemorate the 35th anniversary of China and the United States establishing diplomatic relations.

== Cast ==
- Deng Xiaoping as himself.
- Jimmy Carter as himself.
- Henry Kissinger as himself.
- Zbigniew Brzezinski as himself.
- Rina Sa
- Chan Tin-suen

== Release ==
The film premiered in Shanghai on 13 May 2015 with wide-release in China on 15 May 2015.
