= Wan Guopeng =

Chinese actor (born 1994)

- Born: September 12, 1994 (age 31); Linkou County, Mudanjiang, Heilongjiang, China
- Education: Heilongjiang University of Chinese Medicine
- Occupation: Actor
- Years active: 2015–present
- Height: 180 cm (5 ft 11 in)

Chinese name
- Traditional Chinese: 万国鹏
- Simplified Chinese: 萬國鵬
Transcriptions
Standard Mandarin
- Hanyu Pinyin: wàn guó péng

Wan Guopeng (Chinese: 万国鹏; pinyin: wàn guó péng, born on 12 September 1994), is a Chinese actor.

== Early experiences ==
Wan Guopeng's family was considered well-off in the local area. His father was a factory accountant and his mother was an obstetrician and gynecologist.[1] When Wan Guopeng was in high school, he became interested in the wonders of traditional Chinese medicine, so he came to Harbin alone and spent three years studying acupuncture at Heilongjiang University of Traditional Chinese Medicine. But when he graduated, he realized that he could not bear the life, aging, illness, and death that doctors often face. At that time, Wan Guopeng was interning in the Department of Traditional Chinese Medicine. Every day he was responsible for measuring the blood pressure and electrocardiogram of an old man with lung cancer. However, a week later, the old man still died of advanced cancer. Wan Guopeng said, "Even very famous doctors couldn't help." This was the first patient Wan Guopeng came into contact with. He found it difficult to accept the sudden loss of life and felt helpless at work.

Wan Guopeng gave up his career as a doctor and began to look for a new direction in life. Later, he saw a sentence in a book in the school library that he can still recite fluently today: Young people should follow the direction of their passion, the direction of their hearts, and the direction of their dreams. In an instant, "like a voice-over", the word "actor" popped into his mind. He finally decided to go to Hengdian World Studios and began to become an Extra (acting). In March 2014, he starred in the inspirational drama film "I Am Somebody" directed by Derek Yee, playing the male lead in his true colors., which was released in 2015.

== Filmography ==
=== Movies ===
Premiere Year	Title	Role	Notes
2015	I Am Somebody	Wan Guopeng	
2016	Money And Love	The Blackout Brother	
2016	Sword Master	Villager A	
2017	The House That Never Dies II	Ahua	
2017	National Girl Group	Ma Bo	Online Movies
2017	Brother, come on!	He Chunfeng	
2018	Brainy Boyfriend: The Undead Detective	Xiao Tang	Online Movie
2018	Wastewood League of Legends	Lin Yingxiong	Online Movie
2019	Extreme Express	Wei Lifeng	
2019	Hello Current	Yan Liang	
2019	Entertainment Pursuit	Baogang	
2021	Chinese Doctors	Takeaway Boy	
2022	Warriors of Future	Huo Naiguang	
2023	Ancient Behemoth: Wolf Lizard	Jiang Zhuoyu	Online Movie
2023	Beyond the Clouds	Feng Baozhi	
2024	I don't want to be friends with you		
To be released	Study Abroad Counterattack Strategy		
To be released	Extreme Spin		

=== TV series ===
First broadcast year	Drama name	Role	Remarks
2015	Destined to Love You	Second generation of officials	
2018	I Am Somebody	Wan Guopeng	Web drama
2018	Never Gone	Jin Zi	
2019	Egg yolk man	Yuan Ye	Web drama
2019	The Gold Medal Lawyer	Allen	Appeared in episodes 1–2
2020	My strange friend	Abu	Web drama
2021	To Be With You	Young Chen Changhai	Web drama, unit "Promise of Youth Forever"
2021	Ping Pong	Liu Shi	
2022	Draw The Line	Meng Wei	
2022	Light me up, warm you	Wu Mengxing	
2024	Live Surgery Room	Feng Xuhui	
2024	The Tale of Rose	Su Gengsheng's younger brother	
To be broadcast	The best solution for life		
