= Love Without Distance =

- 土豪520
- Directed by: Aubrey Lam
- Release date: May 21, 2015
- Running time: 102 minutes
- Country: China
- Language: Mandarin
- Box office: US$3.55 million (China)

Love Without Distance (Chinese: 土豪520) is a 2015 Chinese romantic comedy film directed by Aubrey Lam. It was released in China on May 21, 2015.

== Cast ==
- Francis Ng
- Yao Xingtong
- Ma Tianyu
- Li Jing
- Cica Zhou

== Reception ==
Love Without Distance opened in China on May 22, 2015, earning $3.55 million in its opening weekend, which was the highest-opening for a Chinese film that weekend and falling in third place at the Chinese box office behind Hollywood film Avengers: Age of Ultron and Bollywood film PK.
