= Mid-July Days =

2015 film by Xiao'ao Du

- Poster
- 七月半之恐怖宿舍
- Directed by: Xiao‘ao Du
- Production companies: Beijing Zhongying Chuanqi Media; Beijing Tianze Yinghua Entertainment; Zhejiang Yongkang Dongqing Pictures; Beijing Gushe International Media
- Distributed by: Beijing G-POINT Film Culture Media
- Release date: August 14, 2015
- Running time: 93 minutes
- Country: China
- Language: Mandarin
- Box office: CN¥12.3 million

Mid-July Days (Chinese: 七月半之恐怖宿舍) is a 2015 Chinese horror film directed by Xiao‘ao Du and Liu Hong. It was released on August 14, 2015. It was followed by Mid-July Days 2, released on August 19, 2016.

== Plot ==
Legend has it that around the 15th day of the seventh lunar month every year, the dead ghosts will wander around the world, go to places they were familiar with during their lifetime, and evoke the long-forgotten grudges of the ghosts.

Freshman An Lan and others live in a dormitory that has been dusty for many years, haunted and where people have died. On the night of the 15th day of the seventh lunar month, various strange things happen one after another. The film does not have all kinds of scary ghost face props, gloomy environments, and enclosed spaces to simply scare people. However, in the seemingly elegant and quiet 15th day of the seventh lunar month, with the arrival of the traditional ghost festival "15th day of the seventh lunar month", several young and beautiful female college students began to suffer from pervasive fear, and died one by one in strange and terrifying ways, which is heartbreaking.

== Cast ==
- Xintian Yu
- Zimo Zhai
- Yuan Ma
- Man Fu
- Meixing Chen
- Qian Xu
- Ming Kong
- Zixiang Dai
- Qian Peng
- Liwen Liang

== Reception ==
The film earned CN¥12.262 million at the Chinese box office.
