= Nezha (2014 film) =

- Chinese theatrical release poster
- Chinese: 少女哪吒
- Literal meaning: Girl Nezha
- Hanyu Pinyin: Shàonǚ Nézhā
- Jyutping: Siu^{3}neoi^{5} Naa^{4}zaa^{1}
- Directed by: Li Xiaofeng
- Screenplay by: Li Xiaofeng; Wang Mu; Pan Yu
- Based on: "Shàonǚ Nézhā" by Lü Yao
- Produced by: Shen Yang
- Starring: Li Jiaqi; Li Haofei; Chen Jin; Xin Peng; Li Huan
- Cinematography: Joewi Verhoeven
- Edited by: Liu Yueyue
- Music by: Drew Hanratty
- Production companies: Beijing BHBD Culture Diffusion; Way Good Entertainment
- Release dates: October 5, 2014 (BIFF); July 11, 2015 (China)
- Running time: 98 minutes
- Country: China
- Language: Mandarin
- Box office: CN¥522,000

Nezha (Chinese: 少女哪吒; pinyin: Shàonǚ Nézhā; Jyutping: Siu^{3}neoi^{5} Naa^{4}zaa^{1}; lit. 'Girl Nezha'), stylized on some posters as NeZha or Ne Zha, is a 2014 Chinese period drama film directed by Li Xiaofeng, in his directorial debut.

The film is based on a novella by Lü Yao, and it was released in China on July 11, 2015. Its title refers to the Chinese folk deity of the same name.

== Cast ==
- Li Jiaqi as Wang Xiaobing
- Li Haofei as Li Xiaolu
- Chen Jin as Xu Wanqing
- Wang Yong as Wang Yinghua
- Xin Peng as Xu Jie
- Li Huan as Li Danyang
- Chen Yongjian as Lin
- Ding Pei

== Release ==
The film had its world premiere October 5, 2014, in the New Currents section of the 19th Busan International Film Festival, and was then played in several other festivals, including, on November 16, 2014, in the Golden Horse Film Festival in Taiwan. It went on general release in China on July 11, 2015.

== Reception ==
=== Box office ===
The film earned CN¥522,000 at the Chinese box office.

=== Critical response ===
Derek Elley of Film Business Asia gave the film a 5 out of 10, saying that a "promising story of a female rebel and her bosom pal squanders its early promise."
