= The Road (2015 film) =

- Directed by: Rana Salem
- Starring: Rana Salem; Guy Chartouni
- Release date: June 22, 2015 (Moscow International Film Festival)
- Country: Lebanon
- Language: Arabic

The Road' (Al Tarik) is a 2015 film by Lebanese director Rana Salem. Member of the main competition of the Moscow International Film Festival and Montreal World Film Festival.

== Plot ==
Young couple Rana and Guy live in Beirut. Rana decides to get away from work but now doesn't know what to do with her life. Her husband, a man of purpose, cultivates the land while simultaneously being an independent video artist who creates live performances. Cut off from reality and having lost all sense of time and space, Rana plunges into memories and dreams. Guy decides they need to travel to help ease her mind. After leaving the city, they find themselves among untouched nature and abandoned villages. The travels bring to mind pictures of the past and eventually leads them home in the mountains where Guy spent his childhood.

== Cast ==
- Rana Salem as Rana
- Guy Chartouni as Guy
