= Campus Mystery =

- Poster
- 笔仙魔咒
- Directed by: Er Guan
- Starring: Le-er You; Bingqiang Chen; Manyu Yang; Zui Tao; Sitong Ye; Siwen Li; Yuxing Chen; Huixin Zheng
- Production companies: Beijing Zexi Niandai Entertainment; Zhejiang Yongkang Dongqing Pictures; Zhejiang Mailang Pictures; Beijing Jiahua Chuangyi Entertainment; Jieni (Beijing) International Media; Ahoo (Beijing) International Film & Television; Beijing Zhongying Chuanqi Media
- Distributed by: Beijing G-POINT Film Culture Media
- Release date: October 16, 2015
- Running time: 94 minutes
- Country: China
- Language: Mandarin
- Box office: CN¥0.2 million

Campus Mystery (Chinese: 笔仙魔咒) is a 2015 Chinese horror thriller film directed by Er Guan. The film was released on October 16, 2015.

== plot ==
Song Duoduo, a freshman girl, has a unique psychic ability. She has met female ghosts in the classroom during evening self-study many times. She joined a mysterious organization "Ghost Talk Night" in college. Song Duoduo's good friends Bai Ni, Luo Jing and Qi Xiaochuan are all backbone members of this club. Once Song Duoduo and Bai Ni went to explore the abandoned laboratory building of the medical school, and Song Duoduo saw a female ghost soaked in formalin. In order to relieve stress, the four decided to travel to a deserted island. Unexpectedly, after arriving on this deserted island, Song Duoduo was shocked to find that the natives here saw her as if they saw a ghost! And she also felt that she had been to this strange deserted island in her previous life! In order to figure out what is going on, her companions suggested asking the pen fairy to point out the maze, but the pen fairy game put them into an irreversible curse.

== Cast ==
- Le-er You
- Bingqiang Chen
- Manyu Yang
- Zui Tao
- Sitong Ye
- Siwen Li
- Yuxing Chen
- Huixin Zheng

== Reception ==
The film has earned CN¥0.185 million at the Chinese box office.
