= The Lead Singer and Dancer and His Woman =

- Directed by: Niu Jianrong
- Release date: January 9, 2015
- Running time: 95 minutes
- Country: China
- Language: Mandarin
- Box office: ¥30,000 (China)

The Lead Singer and Dancer and His Woman (Chinese: 伞头和他的女人) is a 2015 Chinese romantic drama film directed by Niu Jianrong. It was released on January 9.

== Cast ==
- Chu Shuanzhong
- Ding Liuyuan
- Peng Jing

== Reception ==
By January 10, 2015, the film had earned ¥30,000 at the Chinese box office.
