= Relationship Dilemma =

- 分手，不分手
- Directed by: Yang Xiaoxin
- Release date: May 8, 2015
- Running time: 90 minutes
- Country: China
- Language: Mandarin
- Box office: CN¥100,000 (China)

Relationship Dilemma (Chinese: 分手，不分手) is a 2015 Chinese romance film directed by Yang Xiaoxin. It was released on May 8, 2015 in China.

== Cast ==
- Ying Yuan
- Yu Jia
- Huang Junjun
- Zhang Tianye
- Jin Luoyi
- Liu Qiushi
- Dong Cheng

== Reception ==
By May 12, 2015, the film had earned CN¥100,000 at the Chinese box office.
