= Zhang You =

Chinese equestrian

Personal information
- Nationality: Chinese
- Born: 28 March 2001 (age 24)

Sport
- Sport: Equestrian

Zhang You (born 28 March 2001) is a Chinese equestrian. He competed in the individual jumping event at the 2020 Summer Olympics.
