= Night of Adventure =

- Directed by: Li Jixian
- Starring: Yan Ni; Geng Le; Shao Bing; Bao Bei'er
- Release date: 6 June 2014
- Running time: 99 minutes
- Country: China
- Language: Mandarin
- Box office: US$4.24 million

Night of Adventure (Chinese: 疯狂72小时) is a 2014 Chinese comedy film directed by Li Jixian.

== Cast ==
- Yan Ni
- Geng Le
- Shao Bing
- Bao Bei'er

== Reception ==
The film has grossed US$4.24 million in China.
