= Shang Hong =

Chinese venereologist (born 1960)

- Born: October 1960 (age 65); Liaoning, China
- Scientific career
- Fields: HIV/AIDS
- Institutions: China Medical University (PRC)

Chinese name
- Traditional Chinese: 尚紅
- Simplified Chinese: 尚红
Transcriptions
Standard Mandarin
- Hanyu Pinyin: Shàng Hóng

Shang Hong (Chinese: 尚红; born October 1960) is a Chinese venereologist who specializes in HIV/AIDS. She has been vice-president of China Medical University and its First Affiliated Hospital. She is vice-president of Chinese Association of STD and AIDS Prevention and Control.

== Biography ==
Shang was born in Liaoning in October 1960. In 2008, she became a member of the 11th National Committee of the Chinese People's Political Consultative Conference. In January 2018, she was elected a member of the 13th National Committee of the Chinese People's Political Consultative Conference.

== Honours and awards ==
- November 22, 2019 Member of the Chinese Academy of Engineering (CAE)
