= Beyond the Clouds (2023 film) =

2023 Chinese biographical film

- Theatrical release poster
- Chinese: 我本是高山
- Hanyu Pinyin: Wǒ běn shì gāo shān
- Directed by: Zheng Dasheng; Yang Jin
- Screenplay by: Yuan Yuan; Chen Qiling
- Produced by: Wu Yanyan; Zhang Yang; Ren Xiaoyi
- Starring: Hai Qing; Chen Yongsheng; Chai Ye; Wang Yueting; Wan Guopeng
- Edited by: Kong Jinlei
- Distributed by: Emei Film Group
- Release date: November 24, 2023 (China)
- Running time: 131 minutes
- Country: China
- Language: Mandarin
- Box office: US$14 million

Beyond the Clouds (Chinese: 我本是高山; pinyin: Wǒ běn shì gāo shān) is a 2023 Chinese biographical drama film directed by Zheng Dasheng and Yang Jin, and starring Hai Qing, Chen Yongsheng, Chai Ye, Wang Yueting and Wan Guopeng. The film is about the life of Zhang Guimei, the founder and principal of Huaping High School for Girls, China's first and only free public high school for girls, and known for her efforts for improving female education in the rural regions of China.

== Plot ==
Zhang Guimei devotes herself to education with unwavering passion, establishing a school in a remote mountainous region despite numerous challenges. The female students candidly express the harsh realities of their lives. Born into poverty, they believe they have little chance of changing their fate and even consider giving up the rare opportunity to pursue an education.

Despite the endless obstacles, Principal Zhang never loses sight of her mission. She firmly believes that education is the key to breaking the chains that hold these children back. With steadfast determination, she journeys tirelessly between the school and the rugged mountains, becoming a guiding light that illuminates the path forward for her students.

== Cast ==
- Hai Qing as Zhang Guimei, founder of the Huaping Girls' Senior High School in Lijiang, Yunnan
- Chen Yongsheng as Lu Nanshan
- Chai Ye as Xu Yingying
- Wang Yueting as Long Zhaohong
- Wan Guopeng as Feng Baozhi
- Yang Haoyu as Director Liang
- Cya Liu as Fu Chunying
- Hu Ge as Dong Yuhan, Zhang's husband

== Production ==
The film began shooting in October 2022. According to public reports, during the scriptwriting phase, the production team gathered a large amount of material about Zhang for research and analysis. The lead actress, Hai Qing, spent two years practicing to imitate Zhang in the filming of the movie. Additionally, the extras who played the role of students were selected from thousands of children by the production team.

== Release ==
After completing production, the film quickly obtained a public screening license and started pre-sale on 8 November 2023. On November 16, the film held its premiere in Beijing. From November 17 to 19, the film conducted advance screenings. On November 18 and 19, members of the production team went to Kunming and Lijiang to hold premiere events. The premiere in Kunming invited female high school graduates from Huaping school, media staff and teachers to watch the film. In the screening event in Huaping County, Zhang Guimei led some female high school students from Huaping to watch the film. On November 24, the film was officially released in mainland China and on that day, Wang Ning, Secretary of Yunnan Provincial Committee of the Chinese Communist Party, and other provincial party and government leaders watched the movie as part of "accepting party spirit education".

By November 22, the total box office collection and pre-sales for tickets of the movie of exceeded 20 million yuan. Following the film's official release on November 24, the film grossed over 38 million yuan ($5.4 million).

== Controversy ==
Prior to the overall release of the film, parts of the storyline of the film led to public controversy in China. This include allegedly turning an alcoholic father in real life into an alcoholic mother and that Zhang's motivation for establishing the high school was mainly influenced by her late husband. This led to criticisms regarding how women are portrayed in the movie. In a now-deleted post in the Chinese social media platform Sina Weibo, film's screenwriter Yuan Yuan wrote in response to the controversy that the change of the alcoholic father into mother in the movie was "meant to showcase women helping women." The China Central Television issued a statement where it accused certain influencers of stoking “gender opposition” for attention and condemned the screenwriters’ “emotional” responses. As a result, Sina Weibo deleted over 1,782 posts regarding the film's controversy, banned 67 accounts that amplified debates regarding the film and deleted 327 posts that called for the boycott of the film.
