= I Am Somebody (2015 film) =

2015 Chinese-Hong Kong film by Derek Yee

- Poster
- 我是路人甲
- Directed by: Derek Yee
- Written by: Derek Yee
- Produced by: Mandy Law; Peggy Lee
- Starring: Wan Guapeng; Wang Ting; Lin Chen; Xu Xiaoqin; Shen Kai
- Cinematography: Chan Wai-nin
- Edited by: Derek Hui; Li Ruiliang
- Music by: Peter Kam
- Distributed by: Zhejiang Bona Film and Television Prod. Huaxia Film Distribution (China); Distribution Workshop (Hong Kong)
- Release dates: 12 June 2015 (SIFF); 3 July 2015 (China)
- Running time: 139 minutes
- Countries: China; Hong Kong
- Languages: Mandarin; Cantonese
- Box office: CN¥63.2 million

I Am Somebody (Chinese: 我是路人甲) is a 2015 drama film written and directed by Derek Yee about extras working at the Hengdian World Studios. A Chinese-Hong Kong co-production, the film was released in China on 3 July 2015.

== Cast ==
- Wan Guapeng as Peng
- Wang Ting as Ting
- Lin Chen
- Xu Xiaoqin as Xiaoqin
- Shen Kai as Kai
- Hao Yifan
- Hao Yifei
- Tan Peijun
- Zhang Xilai
- Wang Zhao as Zhao
- Wei Xing as Wei Xing
- Geng Lishu
- Lin Jian
- Derek Yee
- Anita Yuen
- Fang Ping
- Alex Fong
- Daniel Wu
- Stephen Fung
- Felix Chong
- Alan Mak
- Ann Hui

== Release ==
The film opened the 2015 Shanghai International Film Festival on 12 June 2015 and was released in China on 3 July 2015.

== Reception ==
=== Box office ===
The film earned CN¥63.18 million at the Chinese box office.

=== Critical response ===
Maggie Lee of Variety called the film an "empathetic but overlong ensembler."

=== Awards and nominations ===
Year	Award	Category	Nominated work	Result	Ref.
2015	2nd Hengdian Film and TV Festival of China	Commendation Award	I Am Somebody	Won	
2015	2nd Hengdian Film and TV Festival of China	Rising Star Award	Wan Guopeng	Won	
