= Monsters (2015 film) =

- 异种
- Directed by: Guo Hua
- Written by: Hua Guo; Yung Huang; Ping Yi
- Produced by: Hua Guo; Jingmin Li
- Starring: Qing Liu; Haodong Zhou
- Production company: Beijing Light Cube Culture Media Center
- Release date: June 5, 2015
- Running time: 89 minutes
- Country: China
- Language: Mandarin
- Box office: CN¥0.87 million (China)

Monsters (Chinese: 异种) is a 2015 Chinese suspense horror thriller film directed by Guo Hua. It was released in China on June 5, 2015.

== Cast ==
- Liu Qing
- Zhou Haodong
- Wu Yanyan
- Zhao Qianzi
- Yu Zijian
- Shang Hong
- Li Wenjie
- Luo Xuan

== Box-Office ==
By June 5, 2015, the film had earned CN¥0.87 million at the Chinese box office.
