= Midnight Whisper =

- Poster
- Chinese: 半夜叫你别回头
- Directed by: Shiyu Lu
- Screenplay by: Ning Yang
- Starring: Abby; Guo Yunqi; Ni Musi; Song Jiahao; Han Feng; Wang Xiuhao; Chang Xiaoxiao
- Production companies: Shanxi Feiermu Media; Filmoon Pictures; Beijing Dongfang Gedian Media; Zhejiang Dongyang April Day Entertainment
- Distributed by: Zhejiang Dongyang April Day Entertainment
- Release date: October 30, 2015
- Running time: 90 minutes
- Country: China
- Language: Mandarin
- Box office: CN¥1 million

Midnight Whisper (Chinese: 半夜叫你别回头) is a 2015 Chinese horror thriller film directed by Jiu Jiu. The film was released on October 30, 2015.

== Cast ==
- Abby
- Guo Yunqi
- Ni Musi
- Song Jiahao
- Han Feng
- Wang Xiuhao
- Chang Xiaoxiao

== Reception ==
The film has earned CN¥1 million at the Chinese box office.
