= Zhang Yixin =

Chinese filmmaker

Zhang Yixin (born 1985) is a Chinese documentary filmmaker whose work includes experimental formats and socially oriented themes. She is known for her short film Mega Foundry and for creating documentaries that explore issues of identity, disability, gender, and marginalization in contemporary China.

== Early life and education ==
Zhang Yixin was born in 1985 in Gansu, China. She studied at the National Academy of Chinese Theatre Art (NACTA), formerly known as the Chinese Academy of Traditional Chinese Opera.

== Career ==
Zhang Yixin began her career in the early 2010s, focusing on subjects that explore identity, marginalization, and social change. She was a producer at LeTV's entertainment center, where she developed and directed various short-films, including Walking by Dreams, Electroplating Girl, and Sexual Happiness. Electroplating Girl (2011), follows Miao Wong, a young woman in China's electronic music scene and co-founder of Acupuncture Records and the INTRO Music Festival, as she pursues her artistic dreams while battling illness.

Walking by Dreams is among the early documentaries to depict underground electronic music industry in China. In 2012, she co-directed Sexual Happiness with Lin Jiayi, a short film about a Japanese AV actress visiting China; it was listed among the notable films of the year by the China Independent Film Festival.

Asking Xuefeng (2014), co-directed with Li Ning, is a short film based on Zen Buddhist philosophy and was produced in collaboration with Xuefeng Temple in Fujian. In 2015, she co-directed Our Times: A Decade of Daring Thoughts, a documentary series executive produced by Jia Zhangke and created in collaboration with Youku Tudou and Telunsu. This series features ten short films that document the journey of 10 influential figures across various industries over the past decade.

In 2018, she began filming Singing for Silence, a feature documentary about a choir formed by hearing-impaired children in China in Guangxi.

Mount Ni (Ni-Shan) (2019) is a cultural documentary directed by Zhang. The film combines historical narratives with contemporary perspectives related to the birthplace of Confucius and examines the presence of Confucian thought in modern Chinese society.

She has directed a variety of documentary works addressing underrepresented identities and social themes. Her film My Little Lies (2023) explores the emotional and legal complexities of LGBTQ+ individuals in fake marriages.

Zhang has worked on collaborative projects as a segment director, including the Louis Vuitton documentary series Journey of the Muse, where she directed Zhu Zheqin (Dawada) in collaboration with the director Lixin Fan.

In 2023, Zhang completed Mega Foundry (Chinese: 超级工厂), which was released in 2024. It was an experimental short filmed in 2017, exploring labor and repetition in Yiwu's industrial zones.

Zhang Yixin also worked as a visiting professor at the Sichuan University of Media and Communications.

== Awards and recognition ==
Zhang's work has been recognized at several film forums and festivals. In 2013, she received the CNEX Best Potential for Impact award at the CCDF forum and the Youth Jury Hope Award at the Chinese Screen Film Festival in Paris.

Singing for Silence was selected for screening at the New Zealand Edge Film Festival and Dhaka DocLab in 2022. It received both the Top Ten Proposal Award and the IFG Most Influential Potential Award at the CCDF Forum.

Zhang Yixin's Mega Foundry (Chinese: 超级工厂), received the Experimental Jury Prize at the USA Film Festival's 2025 edition. The film was also included in the Best Short Film competition at the 2025 Short Shorts Film Festival & Asia.
