= Onion From the Boot of a Benz =

- Directed by: Guo Minger
- Production company: Hulun Beier Jinma Media Creative industries (film) Ltd
- Distributed by: Shanghai Shengxing Media Co., Ltd
- Release date: January 27, 2015
- Running time: 90 minutes
- Country: China
- Language: Mandarin
- Box office: CN¥160,000

Onion From the Boot of a Benz (Chinese: 奔驰的大葱) is a 2015 Chinese comedy film directed by Guo Minger. It was released on January 27, 2015.

== Cast ==
- Zhou Dehua
- Han Xuewei
- Dong Lifan
- Yu Fei
- Lu Yang
- Wang Hao
- Biligtü
- Wang Zhengquan
- Tang Dagang
- Wang Peilu

== Reception ==
By January 29, the film had earned CN¥160,000 at the Chinese box office.
