= Yang Caiyu =

Chinese actress (born 1992)

- 杨采钰
- Born: September 28, 1992 (age 34); Wuhan, Hubei, China
- Other name: Oraphan Saithong
- Citizenship: (Note: Although her nationality remains unclear, most of the Chinese media sources state that she was born to a Thai father and Chinese mother. When she applied for admission at the Beijing Film Academy, she applied as a foreign candidate. China's nationality laws do not recognize dual nationality.)
- Education: Beijing Film Academy
- Occupations: Actress, Singer
- Years active: 2012–present
- Height: 168 cm (5 ft 6 in)
- Spouse: Zhang Hongzheng (m. 2025)

Yang Caiyu (Chinese: 杨采钰; pinyin: Yáng Cǎiyù; born 28 September 1992) is a Thai Chinese actress. She made her acting debut in the short film Boy's Diary (2012), and has since gone on to appear in numerous film titles such as Love in the 1980s (2015), Youth (2017) and Don't Forget Your Original Heart (2018).

== Early life and education ==
Born in 1992, Yang attended a kindergarten in Wuhan before moving to Shenzhen, where she finished fifth grade and skipped directly to junior high school. In the second year of junior high school, she was one of the city's top three students and the only one in her whole grade. In March 2007, she served as the host of the 2nd National Primary and Secondary School Art Exhibition and Awards Gala finals hosted by the Ministry of Education.

After graduating from middle school, she moved to the United States where she continued with her high school education. In 2011, Yang was accepted to the University of Southern California, Boston University and other five universities in the United States for major in media, but chose to return to China where she applied for admission as a foreign candidate at the Beijing Film Academy. She was successfully admitted to the Performance Department and actress Zhou Dongyu was in her same class. During her time at the Beijing Film Academy, she served as a freshman class representative of the Performance Department and bilingual host of the 10th Beijing Film Academy International Student Film Festival in 2011.

After she graduated from Beijing Film Academy in 2017, Yang received an offer of admission from Columbia University for MFA, making her the third Chinese candidate to receive admission for the MFA program at Columbia University. But she declined the admission in order to pursue her acting career.

== Career ==
In 2003, she sang the ending song of the Chinese animated series The Legend of Nezha. In 2012, she made her acting debut in the short film Boy's Diary, a promotional short film for Peking University and in TV drama Code of Youth. In 2013, Yang starred alongside Scott Adkins and Dolph Lundgren in the 3-D movie Legendary.

In 2015, she starred in the romance film Love in the 1980s, which was directed Huo Jianqi. In the film, she played the role of Cheng Liwen. The film was nominated in the 18th Shanghai International Film Festival. In 2017, she starred in the mystery thriller film Edge of Innocence and on the same year, she starred in the film Youth, which was directed by Feng Xiaogang and written by Yan Geling. In the film, she played the role of Lin Dingding and for her performance, she received the Best Supporting Actress Award at the first Marianas International Film Festival in Saipan.

In 2018, she starred alongside Li Chen and Wang Qianyuan in the adventure suspense TV drama Seven Days. In 2020, she starred in the film Only Cloud Knows, which was also directed by Feng Xiaogang.

In 2021, she starred in a series of short dramas Faith Makes Great, which was made by the National Radio and Television Administration to celebrate the 100th Anniversary of the Chinese Communist Party. On the same year, for her performance in the TV drama Like a Flowing River 2, she was nominated for Best Actress in a Chinese Contemporary TV Drama at the 32nd Huading Awards.

== Personal life ==
On 6 July 2017, Yang publicly revealed that she was in a relationship with businessman Chen Jinfei, the CEO of Beijing Tongchan Investment Group and Hongxing Entertainment Media Investment Co., Ltd, and is 30 years her senior. Chen was also the member of the 9th and 10th National Committee of the Chinese People's Political Consultative Conference. He is also the godfather of Chinese actress Liu Yifei. Yang and Chen separated on an unknown date.

On 2025, she married entrepreneur Zhang Hongzheng, the general manager of Jinlu Daily Chemicals based in Quanzhou, Fujian.

== Filmography ==
=== Films ===
- Legendary (2013) - Bai Xi
- Love in the 1980s (2015) - Cheng Liwen
- Edge of Innocence (2017) - Xia Yingying
- Youth (2017) - Lin Dingding
- Only Cloud Knows (2019) - Jennifer Luo Yun
- Inversion (TBA)
- The White Storm 3 (2023) - Noon

=== Television ===
- Happy Camp (1997) - Herself (Episode No. 1008)
- Day Day Up (2008) - Herself (Episode No. 681)
- Code of Youth (2012) - Ouyang Keyi
- Twenty-Four Hours (2018) - Herself (Season 3, Episode No. 6 & 7)
- Seven Days (2019) - Jenny
- Truth! Flowers and Everything (2019) - Herself
- Sniper (2020) - Ouyang Xiangling
- Like a Flowing River 2 (2020) - Liang Sishen
- Faith Makes Great (2021) - Ge Lan
- Ode to Joy 3 (2022) - Fang Zhiheng
- Like a Flowing River 3 (2023) - Liang Sishen
- Ode to Joy 4 - Fang Zhiheng (2023)
- Ode to Joy 5 - Fang Zhiheng (2024)
- Young Babylon - Bai Lan (TBA)
