= Chen Nianxi =

Chinese poet

Chen Nianxi (Chinese: 陈年喜; born February 5, 1970) is a Chinese poet from Shaanxi, whose poetic genre is "migrant worker literature".

== Biography ==
Chen was born in Danfeng County, Shaanxi. Following high school graduation in 1987, Chen got married and worked as a farmer, and had a son in 1999. Alongside publishing poetry in local publications, he worked as a miner for approximately 15 years across China, particularly in the Qinling mountain range.

In 2011, along with the growth of microblogging in China, he was able to reach a broader audience. This eventually attracted the attention of Qin Xiaoyu, a film critic and producer, who profiled Chen in his 2015 documentary The Verse of Us.
