= Nowhere to Run (2015 film) =

- 封门诡影
- Directed by: Wang Mengyuan
- Release date: March 13, 2015
- Running time: 92 minutes
- Country: China
- Language: Mandarin
- Box office: CN¥25.6 million (China)

Nowhere to Run (Chinese: 封门诡影) is a 2015 Chinese suspense thriller film directed by Wang Mengyuan. It was released on March 13, 2015.

== Cast ==
- Zhang Duo
- Liu Ying
- Ge Tian
- Sui Yongliang
- Qian Sitong
- Du Yuting
- Tu Yuwei
- Yuchi Shaonan

== Reception ==
By April 13, the film had earned CN¥25.61 million at the Chinese box office.
