= Zhang Xiyuan =

Chinese actress and model

- Born: 12 November 1989 (age 36); Shenyang, Liaoning Province, China
- Education: Beijing Technology & Business University
- Occupations: Actress, Model
- Years active: 2011–present
- Agent: Bliss Media

Chinese name
- Traditional Chinese: 張熙媛
- Simplified Chinese: 张熙媛
Transcriptions
Standard Mandarin
- Hanyu Pinyin: （Zhāng Xīyuán）

Zhang Xiyuan (Chinese: 张熙媛; pinyin: Zhāng Xīyuán; born 12 November 1989), also known as Crystal Zhang, is a Chinese actress and model born in Shenyang.

== Career ==
Zhang completed her undergraduate studies at Beijing Technology & Business University before entering the entertainment industry.

Zhang made her professional acting debut with the role of Liu Xinmei in the 2011 Chinese television drama Before the Dawn.

After gaining fame with her role in Before the Dawn, she then went on to appear in a number of television series and a made-for-television film before landing the role of Lin Na in the 2015 comedy film Money Game.

== Filmography ==
=== Film ===
Year	English title	Chinese title	Role	Notes
2015	Money Game	黄金福将	Lín Nà	

=== Television series ===
Year	English title	Chinese title	Role	Notes
2012	Before the Dawn	黎明绝杀	Liu Xinmei	
2012	The City of Fog	雾都	Xiu Wen	
2013	Tao Lady	涛女郎	Fang Tong	
2013	The Spies	穷追不舍	Wu Manli	
2014	The Lady in Cubicle	格子间女人	Wen Xiaohui	
2016	Chronicle of Life	寂寞空庭春欲晚	Fujin	
2017	Love Just Come	爱，来得刚好	Duan Xueqing	
2017	Super Dad & Super Kids	熊爸熊孩子	Duan Yunan	
2017	Love of Aurora	极光之恋	Ding Tong	
