= The Verse of Us =

- Chinese-language poster
- Chinese: 我的诗篇
- Directed by: Feiyue Wu; Xiaoyu Qin
- Produced by: Qingzeng Cai
- Production companies: Elephant Micro Record; Shanghai Yiteng Entertainment; Iqiyi Pictures; Lanshizi Media Originality; Beijing Erli Shijie Media
- Distributed by: China Film Group Corporation
- Release date: November 1, 2015
- Running time: 85 minutes
- Country: China
- Language: Chinese
- Budget: US$80,000
- Box office: CN¥1.35 million

The Verse of Us (simplified Chinese: 我的诗篇; traditional Chinese: 我的詩篇; pinyin: wǒ de shīpiān; lit. 'my poem(s)'). also known as Chinese Verses and Iron Moon, is a 2015 Chinese feature documentary film directed by Xiaoyu Qin and Feiyue Wu. The documentary follows working class poets in China. The film was released in China by China Film Group Corporation on November 1, 2015. It was also released internationally and has won multiple awards.

== Cast ==
- Wu Xia — working class poet
- Xu Lizhi — working class poet
- Wu Niaoniao — working class poet
- Chen Nianxi — working class poet

== Reception ==
The film grossed CN¥1.35 million at the Chinese box office.

=== Awards ===
Year	Festivals	Awards	Conditions
2015	Shanghai International Film Festival	Golden Goblet - Best Documentary	Won
2015	Golden Horse Film Festival and Awards	Best Documentary	Nominated
2015	Golden Horse Film Festival and Awards	Best Film Editing	Nominated
2015	International Documentary Film Festival Amsterdam	IDFA Competition for First Appearance	Nominated
2015	Guangzhou International Documentary Film Festival	Golden Kapok - Best Documentary	Won
2015	Guangzhou International Documentary Film Festival	Golden Kapok - Best Sound Effects	Won
2015	China Academy Awards of Documentary Film	Best Documentary	Won
2015	China Academy Awards of Documentary Film	Jury Prize	Nominated
2015	China Academy Awards of Documentary Film	Best Feature Documentary	Nominated
2015	China Academy Awards of Documentary Film	Best Innovation Award	Nominated
2015	International Gold Panda Documentary Festival	Best Humanities Documentary	Nominated
2016	Shanghai Film Critics Awards	Best First Feature	Won
