= Money Game (film) =

- .
- 黄金福将
- Directed by: Huang Wei
- Production companies: Shenzhen Shiguan Media Co., Ltd
- Distributed by: Shanghai Kaiyi Entertainment Co., Ltd; Beijing ZhonghengFinancial investment and Resource Management Co., Ltd
- Release date: January 23, 2015
- Running time: 90 minutes
- Country: China
- Language: Mandarin
- Box office: CN¥210,000

Money Game (Chinese: 黄金福将) is a 2015 Chinese comedy film directed by Huang Wei. It was released on January 23, 2015.

== Cast ==
- Lee Seung-hyun
- Zhang Lanxin
- Liu Hua
- Hu Xia
- Zhang Yishan
- Bao Jianfeng
- Cao YunJin
- Li Chengfeng
- Xie Jinyuyin
- Mimi Chu
- Cheung Kwok Keung
- Crystal Zhang
- Zhang Dali
- Guan Ling

== Reception ==
By January 23, the film had earned CN¥210,000 at the Chinese box office.
