= Film Business Asia =

Defunct Hong Kong film trade magazine

- Available in: English
- Owners: Patrick Frater; Stephen Cremin
- Launched: 2010
- Current status: Inactive (2015)

Film Business Asia was a film trade magazine based in Hong Kong. The magazine was created in 2010 by Patrick Frater, former journalist for Variety, The Hollywood Reporter, and Screen International and Stephen Cremin, co-founder of the London Pan-Asian Film Festival. The magazine specifically focused on the film development and news of the Asia-Pacific region, as well as reviews. Its chief-film-critic was Derek Elley, former resident critic at Variety. In 2011, the magazine launched the Asian Film Database, boasting information on over 45,000 films in the Asia-Pacific regions It was operated by Film Business Asia Limited.

== See also ==
- List of film periodicals
- Hindi cinema
