= Anywheel =

Bike-sharing company (founded 2017)

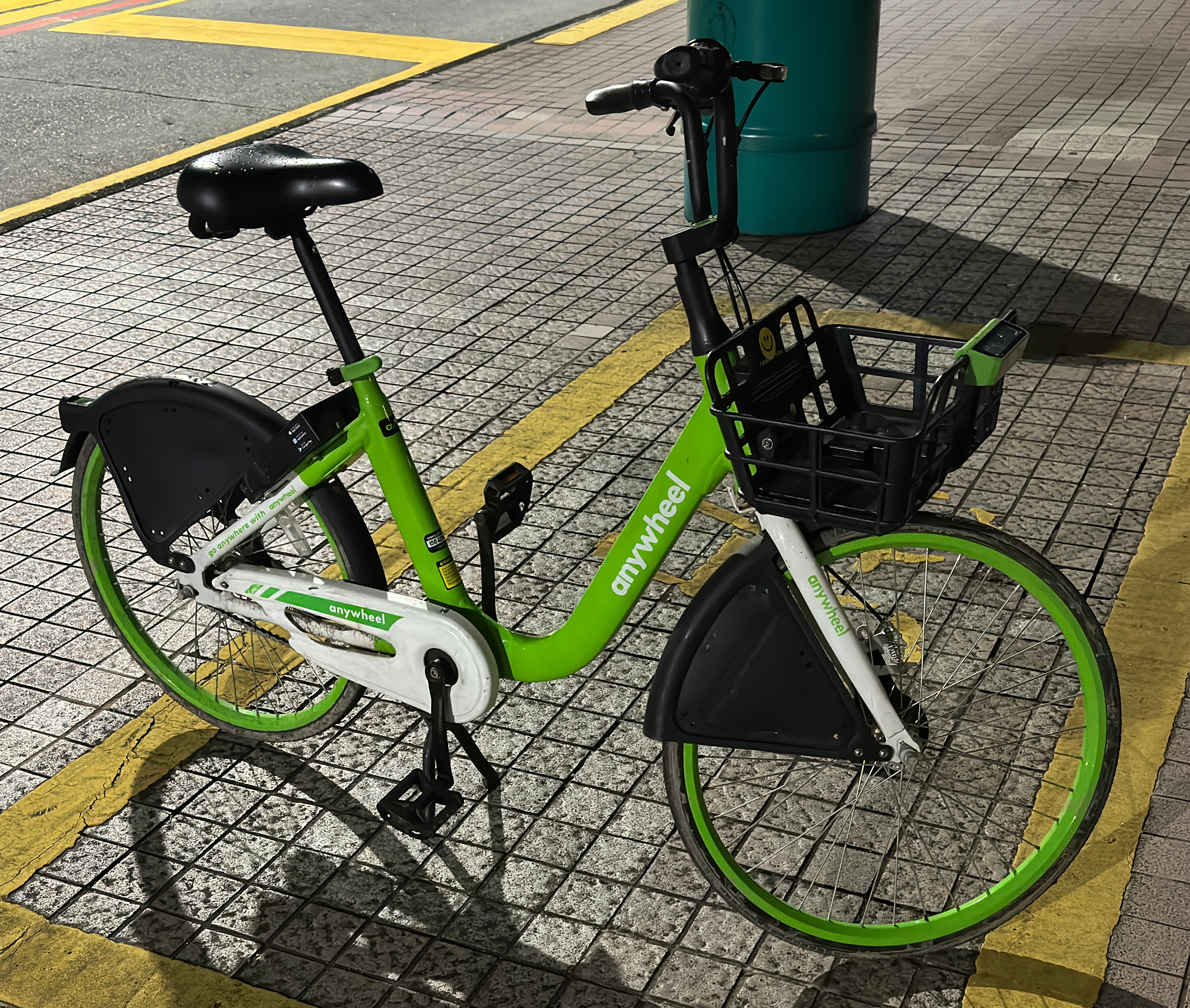
- Anywheel bicycle
- Type: Private
- Industry: Transportation, Micromobility
- Predecessor: SG Bike
- Founded: September 22, 2017; 8 years ago in Singapore
- Founder: Htay Aung
- Area served: Singapore, Thailand
- Products: Bicycle rental
- Website: www.anywheel.sg

Anywheel (Note: Chinese: 随行单车; pinyin: suí xíng dān chē) is a bike-sharing service founded in Singapore in 2017 by Htay Aung.

Anywheel took over SG Bike's bicycle-operating licence in Singapore in 2024 following its expiration. As of 2024, it was one of two bike-sharing operators, competing with HelloRide, a Chinese company that had operated in Singapore since July 2022. Anywheel is also found internationally, having expanded to Thailand in 2020.

== History ==
Anywheel was founded in Singapore and was launched on 22 September 2017, World Car-Free Day, by Burmese founder and chief executive officer Htay Aung. Aung was inspired to make an environmentally friendly and profitable business during his final year of business studies at the University of Sydney, when his car's air-conditioning was unable to cool the 43 °C weather in Australia. He started thinking about starting a bike-sharing service after he was stuck in traffic and saw bikers cycle past him. He wanted to supplement the public transport in Singapore, and help users rely less on cars.

In September 2018, Anywheel had a license to operate 1,000 bicycles, increasing to 10,000 in April 2019, 15,000 in July 2020, 30,000 in June 2022, and 35,000 in May 2026. As of 2023, it has an average of 200,000 users per month. In 2025, it served two million users in Singapore.

In 2017, SG Bike, another Singaporean bike-sharing company, entered the Singaporean market, taking over Mobike's license. However, on 30 April 2024, they left the Singapore market due to their license expiring, after having made losses such as S$7.4 million in FY2021/2022 and S$5.5 million in FY2020/2021. SG Bike transferred existing users and account balances to Anywheel, and did not impose fees on Anywheel during the takeover process. Anywheel did not re-use SG Bike's bicycles, and they were removed for scrapping.

Following reports of privately chained rental bicycles from various bike-sharing companies, abandonment of bicycles in places like canals and bins, and vandalism of bicycles, the Land Transport Authority regulated haphazard parking and limited the number of bicycles owned by bike-sharing companies. As such, GBikes, oBike, ofo and Share Bike SG stopped operating in Singapore, struggling to comply with the new regulations. HelloRide, a Chinese bike-sharing operator who started operations in Singapore in July 2022, and Anywheel were the only bike-sharing operators in Singapore as of 2024.

In 2023, Anywheel collaborated with SBS Transit for three years to boost off-peak ridership for buses and trains in the Tampines area, allowing reservations of Anywheel bicycles near bus stops through SBS Transit's phone app.

== International expansion ==
In 2020, Anywheel expanded to Thailand. In March 2026, Anywheel planned to expand to Vietnam, collaborating with Vinhomes, a Vietnamese commercial real estate developer. As of July 2026, it is only available in Singapore and Thailand.

== Product ==
Anywheel is a bike-sharing company. As of 2022, most bicycles were deployed in Marina Bay, East Coast, District 9, and the Central Business District. As of 2022, about 60% of trips were between residences and public transport facilities such as Mass Rapid Transit stations and bus stops. As of 2025, it charged S$1 for every 30 minutes of usage.

Anywheel struggled with the battery life of the bicycle locks, as they generated live location data of the bicycle, which was updated in 2019 when they changed their lock design and battery supplier. The live location data was used to combat haphazard parking.

== Incidents ==
=== Inappropriate use (2020) ===
In April 2020, 234 bicycles were stolen or tampered, and for the six months following it, it received about 40 reports daily due to sightings of personal use of Anywheel's bicycles, such as private chaining or abandonment in alleys and stairways. Plain-clothes officers were deployed to check for proper unlocking of bicycles, and checked for signs of personal locking and tampering. They successfully caught non-conforming users, sending them to the police, taking legal action against them if damages were found, and banning their accounts.

=== Orchard Road impersonation ===
In 2023, scammers in Orchard Road impersonated Anywheel staff to cheat between S$30 to S$50 for Anywheel monthly subscriptions worth S$9.90 from members of the public, ultimately without giving subscription passes. The police and Land Transport Authority were informed, and scam alerts were issued by Anywheel.

=== Attempts of price fixing by HelloRide ===
According to investigations by the Competition and Consumer Commission of Singapore (CCS), Anywheel's sole competitor, HelloRide, proposed price fixing in July 2025 and October 2025, to which Anywheel responded by lodging a complaint to the CCS. HelloRide denied doing so, saying that it was a misunderstanding and complied with competition laws. By 17 August 2026, HelloRide was issued a warning by the CCS.

== See also ==
- Cycling in Singapore
