= Liu Yu =

Liu Yu is the name of:

== Han dynasty ==
- Liu Yu, Prince of Lu (劉餘; died 128 BC), Western Han prince, son of Emperor Jing
- Liu Yu (Ziqi) (劉瑜), style name Ziqi (子奇), Eastern Han official
- Liu Yu (warlord) (劉虞; died 193), Eastern Han nobleman and warlord

== Jin dynasty ==
- Liu Yu (Western Jin), Jin official

== Liu Song dynasty ==
- Emperor Wu of Song (363–422), personal name Liu Yu (劉裕), founder of Liu Song
- Emperor Ming of Song (439–472), personal name Liu Yu (劉彧) and grandson of Emperor Wu
- Emperor Houfei of Song (463–477), personal name Liu Yu (劉昱) and son of Emperor Ming

== Song dynasty ==
- Liu Yu (Song dynasty) (劉豫; 1073–1146), Qi puppet emperor installed by Jin dynasty (1115–1234)

== Contemporary people ==
- Liu Yu (political scientist) (刘瑜; born 1975), Chinese writer and political scientist
- Liu Yu (swimmer) (born 1982)
- Liu Yu (para swimmer) (born 1989), double Paralympic gold medal swimmer
- Liu Yu (footballer) (刘宇; born 1985)
- Liu Yu (baseball) (born 1991), Chinese baseball player
- Liu Yu (singer) (born 2000), Chinese singer
- Yu Liu (professor), American historian, professor and Guggenheim Fellow
- Yu Liu (entrepreneur) (刘禹; born 1986)
- Yu Liu (golfer), Chinese golfer
- Yu Liu (biomechanist), sports biomechanist
