= Cycling in Singapore =

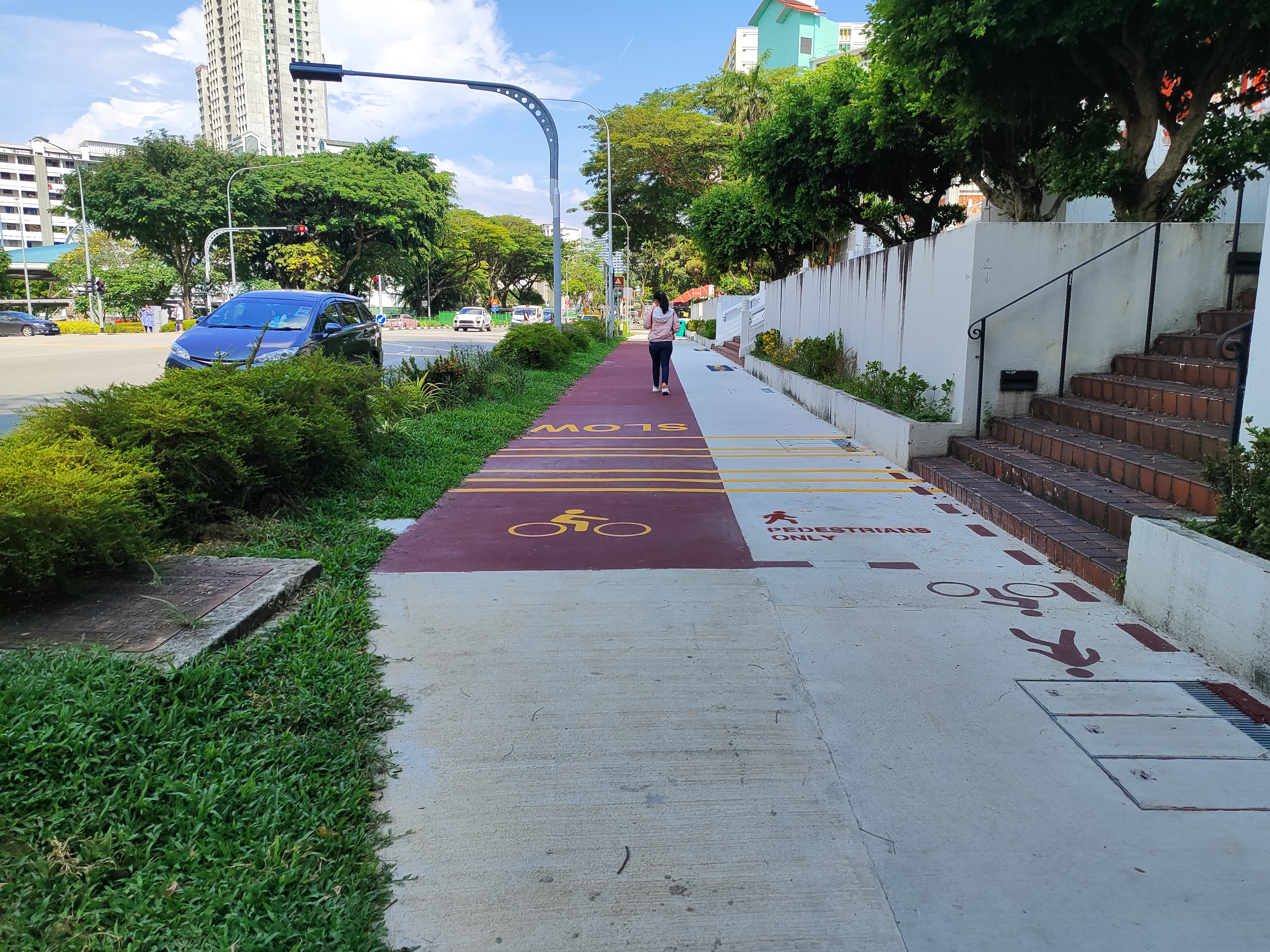
A segregated cycling and pedestrian path in Toa Payoh

Cycling in Singapore is a developing mode of transportation within the citystate, and continues to grow with 1,300km of off-road cycling paths being built, and the emergence of shared-bicycle services. Despite this, cycling continues to face challenges in safety and growth. Cycling remains niche, with only 1% of trips being done on bicycle. Cycling conditions vary too, as off-road paths are viewed as discontinuous, while on-road cycling can be dangerous for cyclists. At the same time, cycling can be negatively associated with dangerous behaviour by road users, leading to calls for more gracious and safe riding.

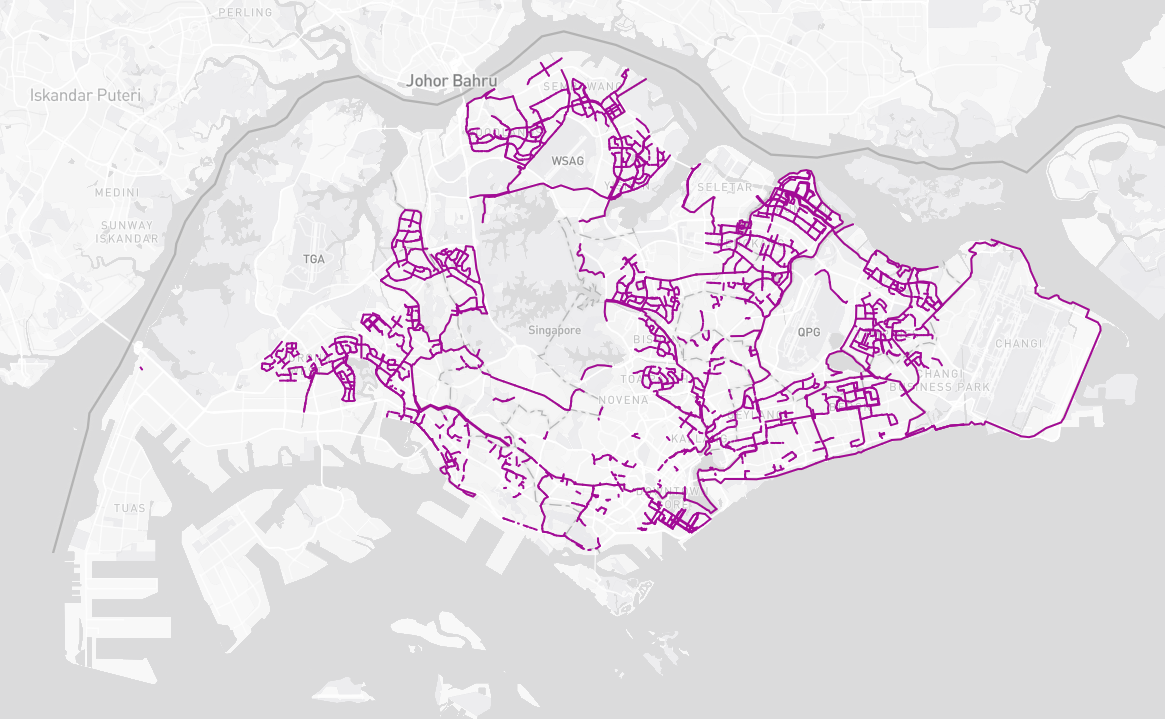
A map of the combined PCN and CPN network as of July 2026

== History ==
=== 1960s-1990s - Removal of old cycle tracks ===
It was reported back then that major roads, such as Nicoll Highway, had cycle tracks in the 1960s. However, these were discontinued and gradually removed by the Public Works Department (PWD) in the 1980s, citing space allocation for bicycles and buses, and no proven track record of cycle tracks improving safety.

In the 1990s, grassroots leaders in Pasir Ris petitioned the LTA for bicycle lanes. In response, LTA stated that too much space that was meant for cars would be taken up, and it would be better to build cycle racks away from the road, and within HDB neighbourhoods.

In 1995, Kallang Park Connector was built as the first park connector, linking Bishan-Ang Mo Kio Park and Kallang Riverside Park.

=== 2000s - Early development of off-road cycling infrastructure ===
The Pasir Ris 21 project, by the Pasir Ris Town Council, involved the construction of a 1.5km long bicycle path and pedestrian walkway.

The Land Transport Authority trialled allowing cyclists to share footpaths in Tampines, between 27 May 2007 to 30 May 2008. After the trial, 1.2km of footpaths were widened to 2 metres to allow for shared usage.

A Cycling Facilitation Committee was established in 2009, composed of key grassroots leaders, government agencies and cycling support groups.

=== 2010s - Government investment, bicycle sharing ===
Tampines New Town was made the first cycling town in 2010, where cyclists and pedestrians are allowed to share the footpath under a by-law.

A National Cycling Plan was first outlined as part of the Urban Redevlopment Authority (URA) Draft Master Plan in 2013, as the government acknowledged the increasing use of cycling as a mode of transport. At that point, the Land Transport Authority (LTA) had rolled out the "Cycling Town" initiative, with 6.4 km dedicated cycling paths already completed in these towns. However, transport minister Lui Tuck Yew vetoed the suggestion of demarcating cycling lanes on roads, claiming that it would lead to more accidents. The National Cycling Plan was adopted into the LTA's 2013 Land Transport Master Plan, with the aim of providing 'a cyclist-friendly, well-connected network providing safe and healthy cycling for all'.

In July 2015, the Active Mobility Advisory Panel was commissioned.

In April 2016, the LTA announced the establishment of a dedicated enforcement team, which would work with the Traffic Police and the National Parks Board, to address reckless behaviour by cyclists and Personal Mobility Device (PMD) users. Around the same time, the government-appointed Active Mobility Advisory Panel introduced a set of rules and a code of conduct to guide the safe and responsible use of bicycles and PMDs.

The Active Mobility Act was passed by the Singapore Parliament in January 2017, but enforcement only commenced in May 2018. According to the LTA, they had conducted "safe riding clinics" for users and engaged in dialogues with retailers to help prepare the public for the implementation of the new legislation. Under the Act, Power-assisted bicycles are not allowed on footpaths, while e-scooters are banned from public roads. Speed limits are capped at 15 km/h on footpaths and 25 km/h on park connectors and shared paths. The new law also imposes restrictions on the size and speed of devices permitted on public paths. In May 2019, the LTA reported 3,700 offences committed under the Active Mobility Act.

In early 2017, 3 major bicycle-sharing companies launched in Singapore -- Ofo, oBike and Mobike. In its early days, there were initially few regulations. As a result, five bicycle-sharing companies signed a memorandum of understanding with LTA, NParks and town councils. This required bicycle-sharing companies to remove indiscriminately parked bicycles within half a day, implement geo-fencing technologies by end-2017 and educate users on the proper uses of bicyclkes, and others.

On 5 March 2018, the Parking Places (Amendment) Bill was passed. This included a new licensing regime for bicycle-sharing operators, a review of fleet size every 6 months, and a QR-code based geo-fencing system that came into effect on January 14, 2019. Over the next year, multiple operators would cease operations, including ofo, GBikes, ShareBikeSG, and oBike, some due to failing regulations.

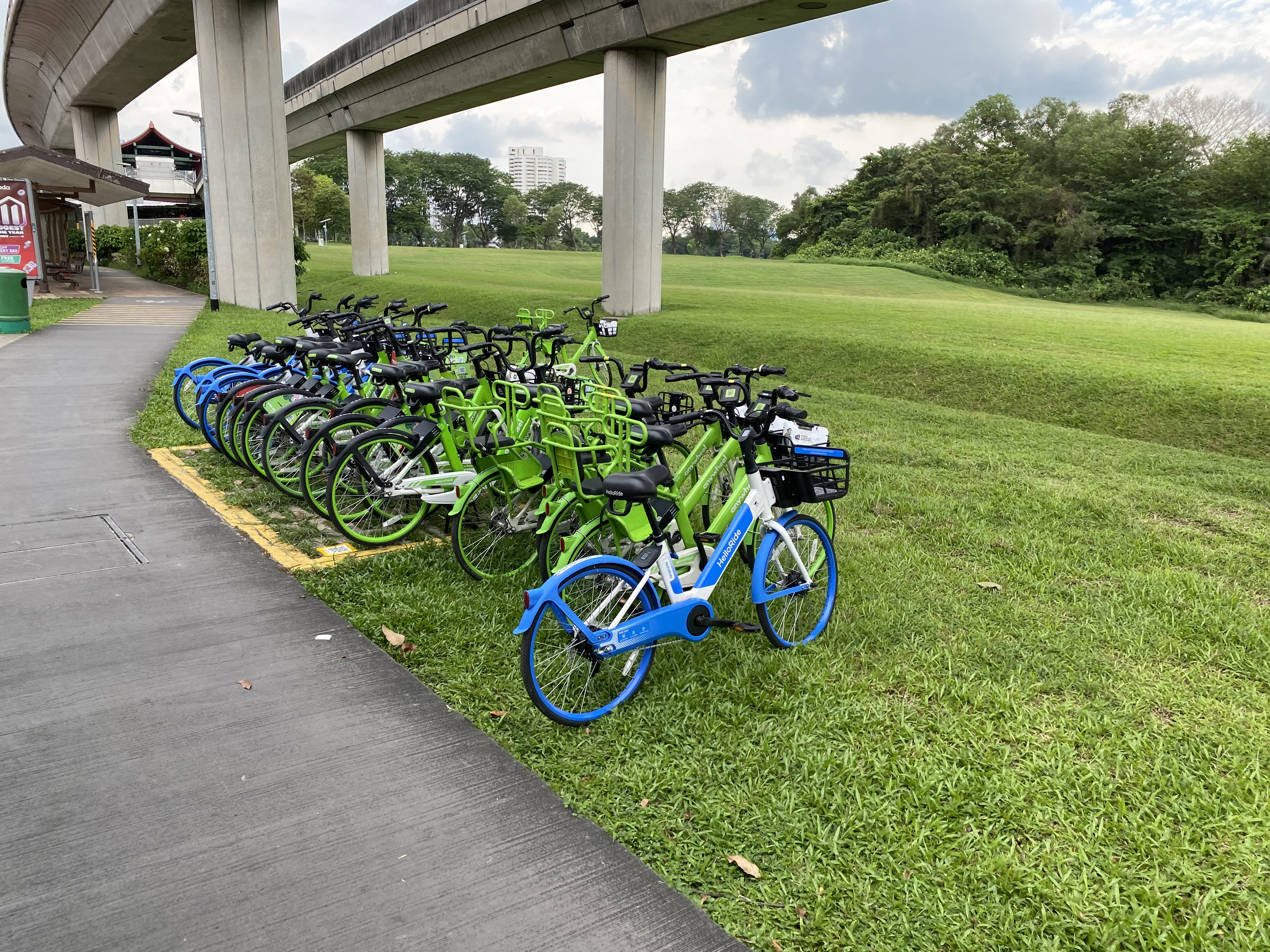
HelloRide and Anywheel shared bicycles near Chinese Garden MRT station

These measures have proven effective as it helped improved the rate of users parking properly at the designated parking areas to being over 90%.

=== 2020s - Transition period ===
In 2020, the LTA launched the Islandwide Cycling Network (ICN) which was launched as part of efforts to accelerate the development of cycling path networks and active mobility infrastructure.

Under changes to the Active Mobility Act passed on 4 February 2020, stricter penalties were imposed on users of electric scooters, e-bikes, and other active mobility devices, including higher fines and longer jail terms. From April, all motorised PMDs will be prohibited on footpaths. Riders under 16 will also be barred from using e-scooters on public paths unless under adult supervision. Additionally, all e-scooter and e-bike users, including new riders, must pass an online theory test starting in the first half of 2021.

After SG Bike exited the market in April 2024 after enduring losses in income, there remained only two operators in Singapore's bike-sharing industry, Anywheel and HelloRide.

On 8 May 2024, He Ting Ru asked the Minister for Transport Chee Hong Tat for updates on studies for possible locations for on-road cycling lanes, and whether the Ministry of Transport will consider trialling them for commuters. In response, Chee stated that on-road cycling lanes are feasible only at locations where vehicular traffic is low, and off-road cycling infrastructure is to be focused on, citing its safety for cyclists and motorists.

In August 2024, the Land Transport Authority (LTA) announced that all bicycles and personal mobility devices (PMDs) will be banned from pedestrian-only paths from 1 July 2025. Offenders could be fined up to $2,000 or jailed for three months, or both while pedestrians who walked on cycling paths will not be penalised. The enforcement was due to the increased cycling lanes besides footpaths. Pedestrian logos and “pedestrians only” wordings would be printed on footpaths next to the cycling paths.

By July 2025, Singapore had a total shared bike fleet of 55,000 bicycles, an increase from 36,000 three years earlier. Of these, Anywheel has 35,000 bicycles and HelloRide has 20,000.

On 18 August 2026, HelloRide was given a warning by the Competition and Consumer Commission for proposing price discussions with Anywheel in July and October 2025. In both cases, Anywheel did not pursue further discussion.

== Cycling infrastructure ==
As of 2025, Singapore has 730 km (450 mi) of cycling paths and park connectors across Singapore, serving residential estates and the Central Business District. A number of inter-town links have been progressively built across Singapore, in the form of bridges and underpasses. Furthermore, road repurposing has been done on specific streets to make way for cycling paths, with the first done at Bencoolen Street.

On a case-by-case basis, cycling lanes have been built such as at Tanah Merah Coast Road and West Camp Road. However, LTA does not intend to build more as of present.

In addition, private developers are required to provide a Walking and Cycling Plan within their Development Application, leading to the provision of cycling infrastructure in new developments. Private developers such as the Sentosa Development Corporation and JTC Corporation are able to build their own cycling infrastructure, as is with Sentosa and Jurong Innovation District respectively.

Singapore's bike routes are found on LTA's website and URA's OneMap.

=== Park Connector Network (PCN) ===
The Park Connector Network (PCN) is a network of walking/running/cycling paths that connects the various parks and other green spaces in Singapore. Both the parks and the PCN are managed by National Parks Board (NParks).

Park Connectors are generally shared paths, with either red continuous lines or a "keep left" marking denoting a PCN path.

=== Islandwide Cycling Network (ICN) ===
The Islandwide Cycling Network by LTA aims to expand the number of cycling paths to 1,300 km (807 mi) islandwide by 2030, through the building of cycling paths and cycling path networks in all HDB towns.

ICN paths are either shared paths, with dotted red outlines, or separated cycling (red) and Pedestrian-Only (grey) paths. Pedestrians are allowed on either path, but are encouraged to stay on the POP for their own safety.

In the Central Area/CBD, shared/cycling paths adopt less intrusive markings in red/yellow to preserve the character of the Central Area.

Area	Completion Date	Length	Status
Ang Mo Kio	~2026	27km	Complete
Bedok	20 January 2018	13km	Complete
Bishan	1 October 2022	7.7km	Complete
Boon Keng	Phase 2: ~2029	TBC	Under construction [Phase 2]
Bukit Batok	Phase 3: from 2027 onwards	TBC	Under construction [Phase 3]
Bukit Merah	Phase 2: ~2029	TBC	Under construction [Phase 2]
Bukit Panjang	18 February 2023	8.5km	Complete
Bukit Timah	Phase 2: ~2029	TBC	Under construction [Phase 2]
Central Business District/Central Area	Initial network: 27 November 2022 Phase 2: ~2029	6km	Under construction [Phase 2]
Changi-Simei	Unknown	TBC	Complete
Choa Chu Kang-Yew Tee	25 August 2024	11km	Complete
Clementi	Phase 3: from 2027 onwards	TBC	Under construction [Phase 3]
Hougang	Phase 3: from 2027 onwards	TBC	Under construction [Phase 3]
Jurong Lake District	Unknown	15km	Complete
Jurong West	Phase 3: from 2027 onwards	TBC	Under construction [Phase 3]
Kallang/Whampoa	Phase 2: ~2029	TBC	Under construction [Phase 2]
Kaki Bukit	TBC	TBC	Under construction [Phase 2]
Loyang	TBC	TBC	Planning
Marina Bay	Clarification needed	TBC	Complete
Marine Parade	TBC	TBC	Under construction [Phase 2]
Newton	TBC	TBC	Planning
Orchard	TBC	TBC	Planning
Outram	TBC	TBC	Planning
Geylang	Phase 3: from 2027 onwards	TBC	Under construction [Phase 2-3]
Pasir Ris	Initial network: 15 February 2015	13.3km	Complete
Punggol	31 October 2016	8.8km	Complete
Queenstown	Phase 3 - from 2027 onwards	TBC	Under construction [Phase 1-3]
River Valley	TBC	TBC	Planning
Rochor	TBC	TBC	Planning
Sembawang	Phase 3: from 2027 onwards	TBC	Complete
Sengkang	Phase 3: from 2027 onwards	TBC	Under construction [Phase 1-3]
Serangoon-Potong Pasir	Phase 3: from 2027 onwards	TBC	Under construction [Phase 2-3]
Taman Jurong	2021	Unknown	Complete
Tampines	Phase 3: from 2027 onwards	14km (2021)	Complete
Telok Blangah	Phase 3: from 2027 onwards	TBC	Under construction
Tengah	TBC	TBC	Under construction
Tiong Bahru	Phase 3 - from 2027 onwards	TBC	Under construction [Phase 1-3]
Toa Payoh	18 October 2025	10.8km	Complete
Tuas	TBC	TBC	Planning
Woodlands	Phase 3 - from 2027 onwards	TBC	Under construction [Phase 3]
Yishun	Phase 3 - from 2027 onwards	Unknown	Complete

=== Rail Corridor ===
The Rail Corridor is a 24-kilometre long greenway created from sections of the former Singapore-Kranji Railway. It has been progressively opened from 2026 onwards.

=== Road Repurposing ===
In some instances, road space has been repurposed for the construction of walking and cycling paths.

==== Bencoolen Street ====
As part of Bencoolen MRT's construction, LTA removed 2 out of 4 lanes of Bencoolen Street, allowing for the construction of a cycling path.

==== Woodlands Ring Road ====
From February to August 2021, a trial converted a section of Woodlands Ring Road (between Woodlands Drive 71 and Drive 63) into a bus-only road. After the trial, one lane was permanently pedestrianised in March 2023, with the other lane open to all vehicles in the eastbound direction. Cycling path works were completed in 2024.

==== Tanjong Pagar Road ====
LTA is planning to repurpose carpark spaces along Tanjong Pagar Road (between Craig Road and Maxwell Road) into cycling paths and wider footpaths.

==== Zion Road ====
2 out of 5 to 6 lanes are currently being repurposed along Zion Road for cycling and walking.

==== North South Corridor (NSC) ====
The North South Corridor's surface streets will be transformed to prioritise walking, cycling and riding. The NSC Master Plan for Surface Streets involves consultancy from Henning Larsen. Some plans include a trunk cycling route, better shared spaces, and safety for cyclists and pedestrians.

=== Cycling lanes ===
==== Tanah Merah Coast Road ====
On 22 April 2017, a 10km on-road cycling lane was introduced on Tanah Merah Coast Road.

==== West Camp Road ====
A 4.6km on-road cycling-bus lane was trialled on West Camp Road, in which buses and cyclists are only allowed on the lane from 5-11am on Sunday mornings. The trail started on 16 October 2022. On 15 April 2023, it was announced that the lane would be made permanent.

==== Sentosa ====
4.5km of on-road cycling lanes were completed on Sentosa in 2016 by Sentosa Development Corporation.

=== Cycling bridges ===
A number of cycling bridges exist across Singapore, mainly connecting Park Connector Networks.

Bridge	Completion date	Length	Status
Ulu Pandan Park Connector Bridge	Unknown	Unknown	Complete
Tampines-Pasir Ris Cycling Bridge	~2027	Unknown	Under construction
Marina Centre-Gardens by the Bay East Cycling Bridge	~2029	Unknown	Under construction
Gardens by the Bay South-East Cycling Bridge	~2028	550m	Under construction
Marymount Cycling Bridge	Unknown	Unknown	Under construction
Jurong West Cycling Bridge	15 February 2025	110m	Complete
Sky Corridor	~2024	11km	Complete
PIE Link	~2027	682m	Under construction

=== The Bricks: Sport-In-Precinct & Cycle Park ===
In 2023, a new bicycle park, The Bricks: Sport-In-Precinct & Cycle Park, was announced to be built at Brickland, Choa Chu Kang. A BMX track, sheltered basketball court, fitness corner and playground will be part of the park.

A BMX pump track previously located in Tampines was demolished.

=== Jurong West Stadium ===
Jurong West Stadium has a dual track, allowing for sports cycling on the outer track.

== Cycling facilities ==
=== Bicycle wheeling ramps ===
Bicycle wheeling ramps have been introduced on staircases since 2013 to make it easier for cyclists to use overhead pedestrian bridges or stairs without carrying them.

=== Wayfinding ===
In 2023, wayfinding signs around the CBD were introduced by LTA to make it easier for cyclists and pedestrians to travel within the city centre. Wayfinding signs for Walking and Cycling Towns can be found at Toa Payoh, Bishan, and Yishun.

Park connectors come with their own wayfinding maps.

Singapore's bike routes can also be found online on Google Maps, LTA's website and URA's OneMap.

=== Bicycle parking ===
==== Public ====
280,000 public bicycle parking lots have been introduced at MRT stations, bus stops, HDB blocks and parks, allowing cyclists to find a place to park. This is especially so for shared bicycles, which require a parking lot with a QR code to park.

==== Private ====
Private developers are required to provide bicycle parking spaces under the URA's Walking and Cycling Plan.

Anywheel has introduced dedicated bicycle parking bays which can only be utilised by Anywheel shared bicycles, such as Hotel JEN and Mandai Wildlife Reserve. Unlike other public bicycle parking lots, these lots' QR codes are only recognised by the Anywheel app.

=== Bicycle crossings ===
120 pedestrian crossings have come with dedicated cycling crossings since 1994, which also have their own bicycle traffic light.

=== Public transport ===
Since 1 June 2017, foldable bicycles and Personal Mobility Devices have been allowed on trains and buses at all hours of the day. This was after a trial from 1 December 2016 to 31 May 2017. General guidelines include a size limit of 120cm by 70cm by 40cm, keeping bicycles folded at all times, no riding, and no obstruction of doors and pathways.

SBS Transit partnered with Anywheel on 10 July 2024 to allow commuters to reserve a shared bicycle parked at or near bus stops using the SBS Transit phone app.

Public bicycle parking facilities, which allow for shared bicycles, are available at most MRT stations and bus stops.

== Sports cycling ==
The governing organisation for cycle sport in Singapore is the Singapore Cycling Federation. It is national governing body for the promotion and development of the sport of cycling (BikeTrial, BMX, MTB, Road and Track) in Singapore, and is affiliated to the Singapore National Olympic Council, the Asean Cycling Association, the Asian Cycling Confederation and Union Cycliste Internationale.

== Advocacy groups ==
A number of advocacy groups exist for cycling safety today, such as Cycling Without Age, Safety for Active Mobility Users, and Love Cycling SG.

== Events ==
=== OCBC Cycle ===
OCBC Bank organised the yearly OCBC Cycle is an annual mass-participation cycling event held on closed public roads since 2009. The event also hosts the Southeast Asia Speedway Championship which is sanctioned by the Singapore Cycling Federation.

=== Car Free Sunday ===
Car Free Sunday is a yearly event where certain roads in the Central Business District and Civic District are closed to motorists to allow for cycling, walking and various activities. Its last edition was on 2024.

== Culture ==
Sub-cultures tied to cycling, such as fixed-gear cycling, have emerged. Bicycles are also used for utilitarian purposes such as trips within neighbourhoods, and delivery.

== Reception ==
=== Shared bicycles ===
Che Maohao, a researcher from the Singapore University of Social Sciences, said that the increased accessibility of bicycles can supplement the gaps in Singapore's transport, and encourage investment in cycling infrastructure.

Walter Thereisa, a transport economist from the Singapore University of Social Sciences, said that a government-backed bike-operator monopoly which avoids competition is more preferable, as without regulation on bike-sharing operators, private operators will split the market in Singapore too much and cause unrecoverable overhead costs. and 35,000 in May 2026.

Thereisa said that it is challenging to remain profitable while deploying bicycles in residential areas. In 2025, residents in Singapore, as reported by Channel NewsAsia, said that availability of bicycles were limited in residential areas, especially during peak hours, despite efforts to supply bicycles in residential areas.

Thereisa said that many bicycles may become underused as they end up in areas a distance away from stations, such as factories and offices, due usage for first and last mile connectivity.

Thereisa said that electric mobility, such as rental e-bikes, instead of rental bikes, suits hot Singapore's climate better, but no systems are in place to ensure the safe coexistence of such users. Tham Chen Munn, an urban mobility consultant, says that it will increase the distance of the first and last mile connectivity people are willing to ride.

Tham said that it is unappealing to figure out the rules of where a rider is allowed to ride their bicycle, and users may opt to avoid cycling all together with strict regulations, such as banning bicycles from footpaths beside cycling lanes.

An unintended side effect of bicycle-sharing is the decline of bicycle rental shops, most notably those along East Coast Park. This has resulted in bicycle rental shops selling off part of their fleets, downsizing, and pivoting towards guided tours and corporate events. Staff at GoCycling stated that business had fallen by 50% due to bike-sharing, with most customers renting only quadricycles or tandem cycles.

== See also ==
- Tuas Lamp Post 1, a cycling attraction in Singapore
