= Hu Weiwei =

Hu Weiwei may refer to:

- Hu Weiwei (entrepreneur) (born 1982), Chinese business entrepreneur
- Hu Weiwei (footballer) (born 1993), Chinese footballer
