= Tuas Lamp Post 1 =

Lamp post in Singapore known for having stickers

Coordinates: 1.2418°N 103.6149°E

The lamp post in 2026.

Tuas Lamp Post 1 is a cycling attraction in Tuas, Singapore. It is the only lamp post in Singapore on which it is legal to paste stickers. This has led to it being covered in stickers as high as 10 meters up. It is located on Tuas South Boulevard, near the Tuas Mega Port, about 13km from the Tuas Checkpoint.

== History ==
Tuas Lamp Post 1 first gained prominence in 2014, when it was the destination of a group of 60 cyclists in the LoveCyclingSG group during a 50km bike ride from West Coast Park to Tuas. Stopping in Tuas at the end of their "Song Song to Jurong" event, a co-founder of the group, Woon Taiwoon, pasted a "Pedal Until Shiok" sticker on the lamp post. The sticker was later removed by the authorities in routine cleaning by contractors. However, the lamp post gained fame and other cyclists began riding there to take photos and paste their own stickers. Land reclamation for the Tuas Mega Port led to Tuas South Boulevard being extended, so the designation of Tuas Lamp Post 1 was moved to the new end of the road in 2017. This new lamp post is still the current Tuas Lamp Post 1. The lamp post grew in popularity during the circuit breaker measures from April to June 2020, as many Singaporeans took up cycling.

The removal of stickers during routine cleaning of the lamp post was controversial. The last time all stickers on Lamp Post 1 were removed by maintenance contractors was in December 2020.

On 7 January 2021, Transport Minister Ong Ye Kung announced on Facebook that stickers would no longer be removed from the lamp post.

The Tuas Lamp Post 1 is a special lamp post, located in the Western corner of Singapore – with a pin even on Google Maps.

Urban folklore has it that cyclists on round-island trips will make a pit stop there, where they will take photos with the lamp post, and leave their favourite stickers behind.

Many were sad to see these stickers go when street light maintenance contractors cleared them during a routine inspection.

I have discussed with Land Transport Authority, who in turned discussed with JTC. We decided to make an exception for this lamp post, given that it's a far out location and a special spot to help cyclists find their way.

These are little exceptions to the rule, which do not cause disamenities or pose safety hazards to the public, to brighten up life in Singapore.

— Ong Ye Kung, Facebook post

The decision to allow stickers to be legally pasted on Tuas Lamp Post 1 was popular in the cycling community, with cyclists describing it as a remarkable exception in Singapore, where vandalism is generally criminalized and harshly punished under the Vandalism Act.

== See also ==
- Cycling in Singapore
