= Yu Liu (biomechanist) =

Chinese sports biomechanics researcher

Yu Liu (Chinese: 刘宇) is a researcher in sports biomechanics, a professor at Shanghai University of Sport, and a distinguished professor under the Ministry of Education's Changjiang Scholars Program. He directs the Ministry of Education–Shanghai co-constructed Key Laboratory of Exercise and Fitness Science. He led a project on technologies for optimizing winter sports athletes' skills, part of the National Key Research and Development Program's special initiative on science and technology for the Winter Olympics.

== Early life and education ==
Liu was born in Zhangjiakou, Hebei, and began skiing while studying in Germany. He received his bachelor's degree in biomechanics from Beijing Sport University in 1982, and from 1982 to 1987 worked as an assistant researcher in the biomechanics laboratory of the China Institute of Sport Science under the State Commission for Physical Culture and Sports (now the General Administration of Sport of China). He received his doctorate from the University of Frankfurt, where he studied from 1987 to 1992 and worked as a research assistant at the Institute of Sport Science, and subsequently conducted postdoctoral research at German Sport University Cologne in 1993–1994. His doctoral work on the kinematics, dynamics and simulation of sprint running was published as a book in 1993.

== Academic career ==
From 1995 to 2005 Liu taught at Chinese Culture University in Taipei, first as an associate professor (1995–1999) and then as a professor (2000–2005) in the Department of Sport and Coaching Science. He joined Shanghai University of Sport in 2005 as a distinguished professor in its School of Kinesiology. The key laboratory he directs was approved by the Ministry of Education in 2011, inaugurated in 2012 and passed Ministry of Education evaluation in 2014; its research programme covers the biological basis of exercise and fitness, exercise mechanisms in special populations, and exercise ergonomics. By 2023 his research funding totalled more than ¥68 million, according to his university profile. He was a member of the 13th Shanghai Committee of the Chinese People's Political Consultative Conference from 2018, and serves as a member of the committee of the All-China Sports Federation.

== Research ==
=== Neuromechanical enhancement and non-invasive brain stimulation ===
A central strand of Liu's research is the use of non-invasive brain stimulation — transcranial direct current stimulation (tDCS), high-definition tDCS, transcranial alternating current stimulation and transcranial temporal interference stimulation — to enhance human motor performance and to clarify its neural mechanisms. His National Natural Science Foundation of China key project "Effects of Non-invasive Deep Brain Stimulation on the Enhancement of Human Motor Ability and Its Mechanism" was, according to the university, the first NSFC key project in the sports field on this topic. The group has reported that temporal interference stimulation targeting the subthalamic region and the globus pallidus reduced motor symptoms and gait variability in people with Parkinson's disease, and has compared temporal interference stimulation with high-definition tDCS for modulating motor-cortex activity. He has also published on the training potential of non-invasive brain stimulation in esports players. Earlier work by Liu and his group addressed the biomechanics of sprint running and hamstring injury mechanisms, footwear and landing impact, soft-tissue vibration, and exercise interventions — including Tai Chi — for falls and knee osteoarthritis in older adults. With collaborators he has also published correspondence and commentary on physical-activity promotion and public health in China.

=== Winter sports and the Beijing 2022 Olympics ===
Liu was chief scientist of the National Key R&D Program "Science and Technology for the Winter Olympics" special project on key technologies for optimizing winter sports athletes' skills (2018–2022). During preparations for the 2022 Winter Olympics in Beijing, the research team assembled by Liu provided training tests for ski jumpers. The team's rapid biomechanics feedback system combined three-dimensional motion capture, ultra-wideband positioning and speed measurement, and automated tracking equipment. It generated movement data within minutes of receiving the footage for coaches to use in analyzing technique. In an interview with Renmin Zhoukan ("People's Weekly"), Liu said that the research team also used wearable devices to measure skiing speed and trajectories. The project supported China's national ski jumping, aerial skiing, and halfpipe teams. The same programme produced a wearable sensor platform for alpine skiing technique assistance, published in Sensors in 2024, and studies applying computational fluid dynamics to the aerodynamics of ski jumping take-off and flight.

=== Sports artificial intelligence ===
In October 2025 the Shanghai University of Sport–Baidu PaddlePaddle Smart Sports Technology Innovation Center released version 2.0 of the Shanghai University of Sport Sports Large Model (上体体育大模型); the university describes the model as China's first industry large language model dedicated to sport, and version 2.0 is built on ERNIE 4.5 and has been applied to data analysis and training support for national teams in diving, swimming, gymnastics, trampoline, climbing and athletics, as well as provincial teams. Liu led the establishment of the center and of the model's earlier 1.0 version; according to the university, the model supported eight national teams during the Paris Olympic cycle. Liu has also worked on the commercialization of sports technology, and several sports technology companies and products have been spun out of the Winter Olympics programme and the SUS–Baidu center. He is chief expert of the Olympic Science and Technology Innovation Consortium (奥运科技攻关创新联合体), an industry–university–research body established under the General Administration of Sport of China.

== Professional service and editorial work ==
Liu was vice president of the Asia Association of Coaching Science from 2012 to 2018 and has been its president since 2018, and he served on the executive committee of the International Society of Biomechanics from 2013 to 2015. He is a vice chair of the academic committee and of the Sport Biomechanics Branch of the China Sport Science Society, a vice chair of the Exercise and Health Science Branch of the Chinese Geriatrics Society, and a vice chair of the Sports Medicine Committee of the Chinese Research Hospital Association. He is also a vice chair of the Sports Artificial Intelligence Committee of the Chinese Association for Artificial Intelligence. He is an associate editor of the Journal of Sport and Health Science and a member of the editorial boards of Footwear Science, China Sport Science, China Sport Science and Technology, the Chinese Journal of Sports Medicine, the Journal of Medical Biomechanics and the Journal of Shanghai University of Sport. He has served as an expert member of the Ministry of Science and Technology's sports science and technology programme panels, as a member of the General Administration of Sport's expert group for science and technology in support of the Olympic Games, and as a reviewer for the National Natural Science Foundation of China.

== Awards and honours ==
- International Fellow, National Academy of Kinesiology; Fellow, American College of Sports Medicine
- National Teaching Achievement Award, First Prize (ranked second)
- National Huang Danian-style Teacher Team (ranked second)
- Shanghai Technological Invention Award, Second Prize (first contributor)
- Shanghai Science and Technology Progress Award, First Prize (ranked ninth)
- State Council Government Special Allowance; Shanghai Leading Talent; Shanghai "Oriental Scholar" Distinguished Professor
- Distinguished Professor, Changjiang Scholars Program; leading talent of the National High-level Personnel of Special Support Program (the "Ten Thousand Talents Program")
- Shanghai Municipal Teaching Achievement Award, Special Prize; Shanghai May 1st Labour Medal (2022); National Advanced Individual for Returned Overseas Chinese and Their Relatives (2023); China Ice and Snow Sports Science and Medicine Service Innovation Award (2021)

== Selected works ==
=== Books ===
- 刘宇 (1993). Kinematic, Dynamic und Simulation des Leichtathletischen Sprints (in German). Frankfurt am Main: Verlag Peter Lang.
- 刘宇; 李立 (2022). 生物力学研究方法 (in Chinese). Shanghai: Shanghai Jiao Tong University Press.
- 刘宇 (2017). 人体运动生物力学 (in Chinese). Shanghai: Shanghai Jiao Tong University Press.
- 张胜年; 刘宇 (2013). 运动康复生物力学 (in Chinese). Beijing: People's Sports Publishing House.
- 陆爱云; 陆阿明; 周里; 刘宇 (2010). 运动生物力学 (in Chinese). Beijing: People's Sports Publishing House.

=== Selected articles ===
By 2023 Liu had authored or co-authored more than 200 journal articles and held more than 30 authorized patents, including one United States invention patent, covering training and assessment devices such as an adjustable inertia-resistance dumbbell and an instrumented plyometric training and diagnosis system. Representative publications include:

- Li Fuzhong, Liu Yu, Zhu Weimo, Harmer Pamela (2016). "China's challenges in promoting physical activity and fitness". The Lancet. 388 (10051): 1278.
- Li Fuzhong, Harmer Paul, Eckstrom Elizabeth, et al.; Liu Yu (2019). "Effectiveness of Tai Ji Quan vs Multimodal and Stretching Exercise Interventions for Reducing Injurious Falls in Older Adults at High Risk of Falling: Follow-up Analysis of a Randomized Clinical Trial". JAMA Network Open. 2 (2): e188280.
- Tang Weidi, Suo Xiang, Wang Xi, et al.; Liu Yu (2024). "SnowMotion: A Wearable Sensor-Based Mobile Platform for Alpine Skiing Technique Assistance". Sensors. 24 (12): 3975.
- Yang Chenhao, Xu Yongxin, Du Yichao, et al.; Liu Yu (2026). "Transcranial temporal interference stimulation targeting the subthalamic region for motor symptoms in Parkinson's disease: a pilot, randomised, double-blind, sham-controlled crossover study". eBioMedicine. 127: 106245.
