= Hu Weiwei (entrepreneur) =

Chinese journalist and businesswoman (born 1982)

- 胡玮炜
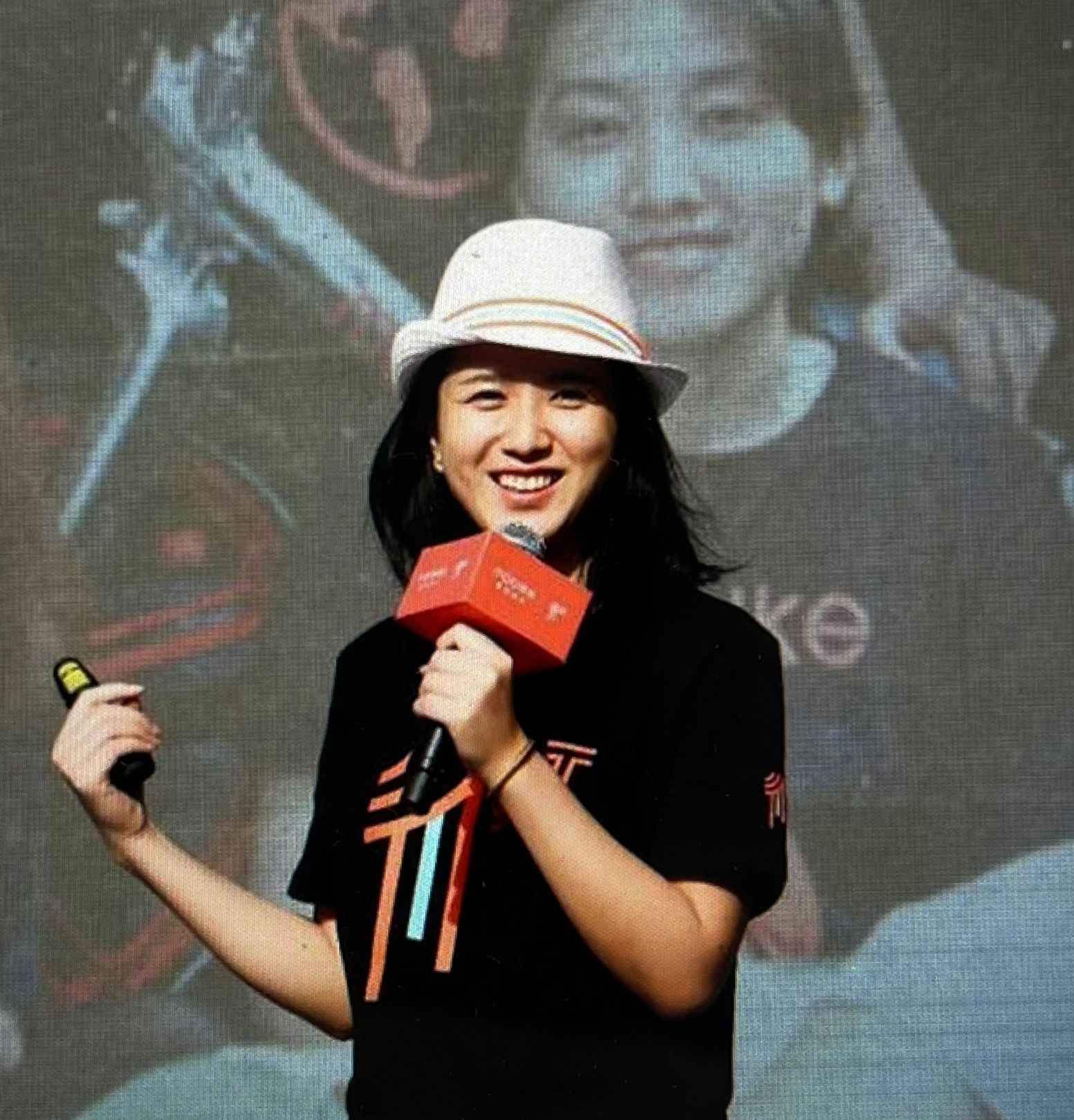
- Hu in 2023
- Born: 1982 (age 43–44); Dongyang
- Education: Zhejiang City College
- Occupations: Journalist; Businesswoman
- Known for: CEO of Mobike (2016–2018)

Hu Weiwei (Chinese: 胡玮炜, born 1982) is a Chinese journalist and businesswoman. She is a co-founder of bicycle-sharing company Mobike.

== Early life and education ==
Hu was born in Dongyang in 1982. She studied at the Department of Journalism of the Zhejiang City College (2000–2004) and graduated with a bachelor of communication.

== Career ==
Hu worked for the Daily Economic News (每经网), a Chinese business newspaper, mainly covering tech news on cars. She then worked for The Beijing News and for Business Value specialising in technology news. In 2014 Hu founded the media platform GeekCar.

Through her contacts in the automobile and technology sector, Hu assembled a team in late 2015 to start a bicycle-sharing company and launched Mobike in January 2016. Co-founder Wang Xiaofeng, the general manager for the Shanghai office of Uber also known by his English name Davis Wang, became Mobike's CEO. Unable to purchase bikes from suppliers to the preferred specifications, the company built its own bikes which rolled out from April 2016.

Early in 2017, Hu was one of seven leaders, scholars and entrepreneurs to present to Premier of China Li Keqiang and other political leaders to provide ideas for the annual Government Report.

In early April 2018, it was announced that Mobike had been acquired by Chinese web company Meituan-Dianping for US$2.7 billion. Wang was reportedly opposed to the takeover and left Mobike at the end of that month, with Hu taking on the role of CEO. Hu left Mobike in December 2018 "for personal reasons". Hu is a member of the Aspen Global Leadership Network.

== Recognition ==
In 2017, Hu and her business partner Xia Yiping were named to Fortune's 40 Under 40 List.

In 2018, Hu Weiwei made the Forbes Asia Emergent Women 25 List.

== Personal life ==
Hu has a son who was born in circa 2010.
