= Yu Liu (entrepreneur) =

Chinese entrepreneur

Liu Yu
- 刘禹
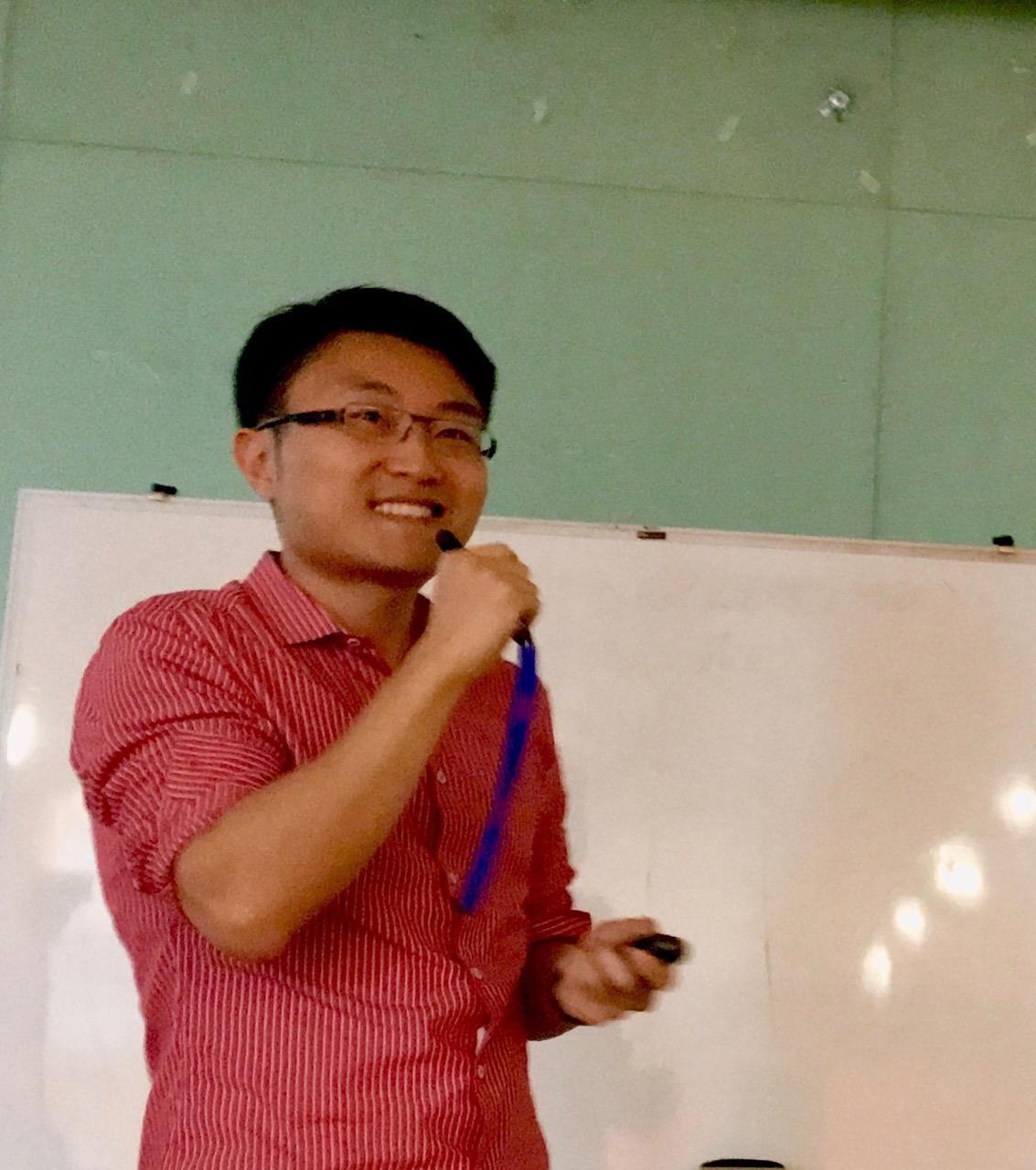
- Born: 1986 (age 39–40); Beijing, China
- Education: Vassar College
- Occupation: Entrepreneur

Yu Liu (Chinese: 刘禹; born in 1986), also known as Eric Liu, is a Chinese entrepreneur and the founder of One Cloud Technologies (operations and patents acquired by Alibaba Group). Between 2015 and 2018, Liu was the head of Alibaba Group's language business unit. During that period Liu was also a member of LocWorld's advisory committee and a special advisor to Mobike. In 2018, Liu was reported to join Mobike as President and in 2019 became its CEO.

== Early life ==
Liu was born in Beijing, China. He attended high school at Shanghai High School and received his bachelor degree from Vassar College in Poughkeepsie, New York. While in college, he was the managing editor of the campus daily, the Vassar Miscellany News.

== Career ==
In 2011, Liu built the 365Fanyi (365翻译)/ Zuodao (做到) dual-site crowdsourcing platform, one of the earliest and largest Internet-based language services in China, and was selected to be a 2011 Ashoka Changemaker, the only finalist from the country. The platform had been operated by One Cloud Technologies until Alibaba announced its acquisition in August 2015. Early investors included Xu Xiaoping, Anna Fang, Zhenfund, Sequoia China and CBC Capital.

After the acquisition, Liu joined Alibaba Group to become the head of its language business unit. During his keynote speech at TAUS Annual Conference 2016 in Portland, Liu stated that the mission of Alibaba's language unit is to "prepare for a future without language barriers". In January 2017, Liu announced that Alibaba will make a significant investment to integrate artificial intelligence into language technologies. While in his role at Alibaba, Liu invested and advised numerous startups, including being a special advisor to Mobike. Mobike was later acquired by a Chinese web company Meituan-Dianping for US$2.7 billion.

In 2018, Liu was reported to join Mobike as President and in 2019 became its CEO. Liu also serves as a member of the board of trustees of Vassar College.
