= Hello (Chinese company) =

Chinese mobility and bicycle-sharing company

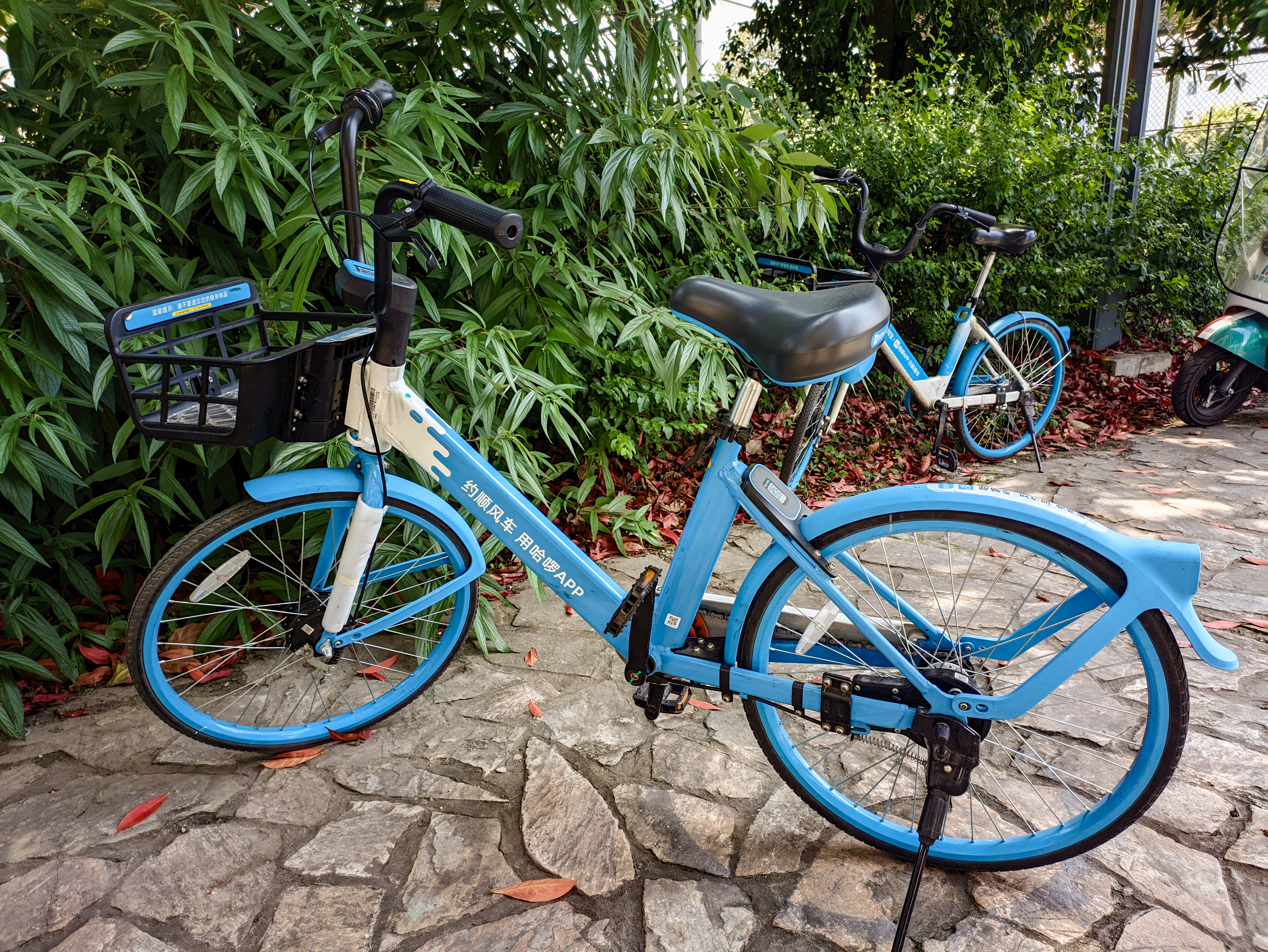
- Hello bicycles in Chengdu, China, 2024
- Native name: 哈啰
- Formerly: Hellobike; Hello Chuxing
- Type: Private
- Industry: Mobility as a service; Bicycle-sharing system; Battery swapping; Ridehailing service; Robotaxi
- Founded: May 2016; 10 years ago
- Founder: Yang Lei; Li Kaizhu
- Headquarters: Shanghai, China
- Products: Shared bicycles, electric bicycles, ride-hailing platform
- Website: hello-inc.com helloride-global.com

Hello (Chinese: 哈啰; lit. 'Hello'; formerly Hellobike and Hello Chuxing) is a Chinese mobility and technology company headquartered in Shanghai, China, and founded in 2016. Ant Group is its largest shareholder, holding an estimated 36% stake, and a key strategic investor, and its services are also accessible through the Alipay ecosystem. The company operates car-pooling, car-hailing, battery swapping, shared bike, e-bike, and e-scooter rental services. It has over 800 million registered users.

The company also operates outside Mainland China under the HelloRide brand, offering bike-sharing services in Malaysia, Hong Kong, Singapore and Australia. In recent years, it entered the robotaxi sector and strategically partnered with CATL, Ant Group, Horizon Robotics and Alibaba Group to develop and commercialize Level 4 autonomous driving technology.

== History ==
=== Founding and bike-sharing expansion ===
The company originally began as a bicycle-sharing operator under the Hellobike brand and was founded by Yang Lei and Li Kaizhu in 2016. The company initially focused on launching dockless bike-sharing service in China's second- and third-tier cities, where the more established competitors like Mobike and Ofo had limited presence, allowing the company to quickly build market share. It later expanded operations into first-tier cities however it maintained its focus on smaller cities and non-metropolitan areas in China.

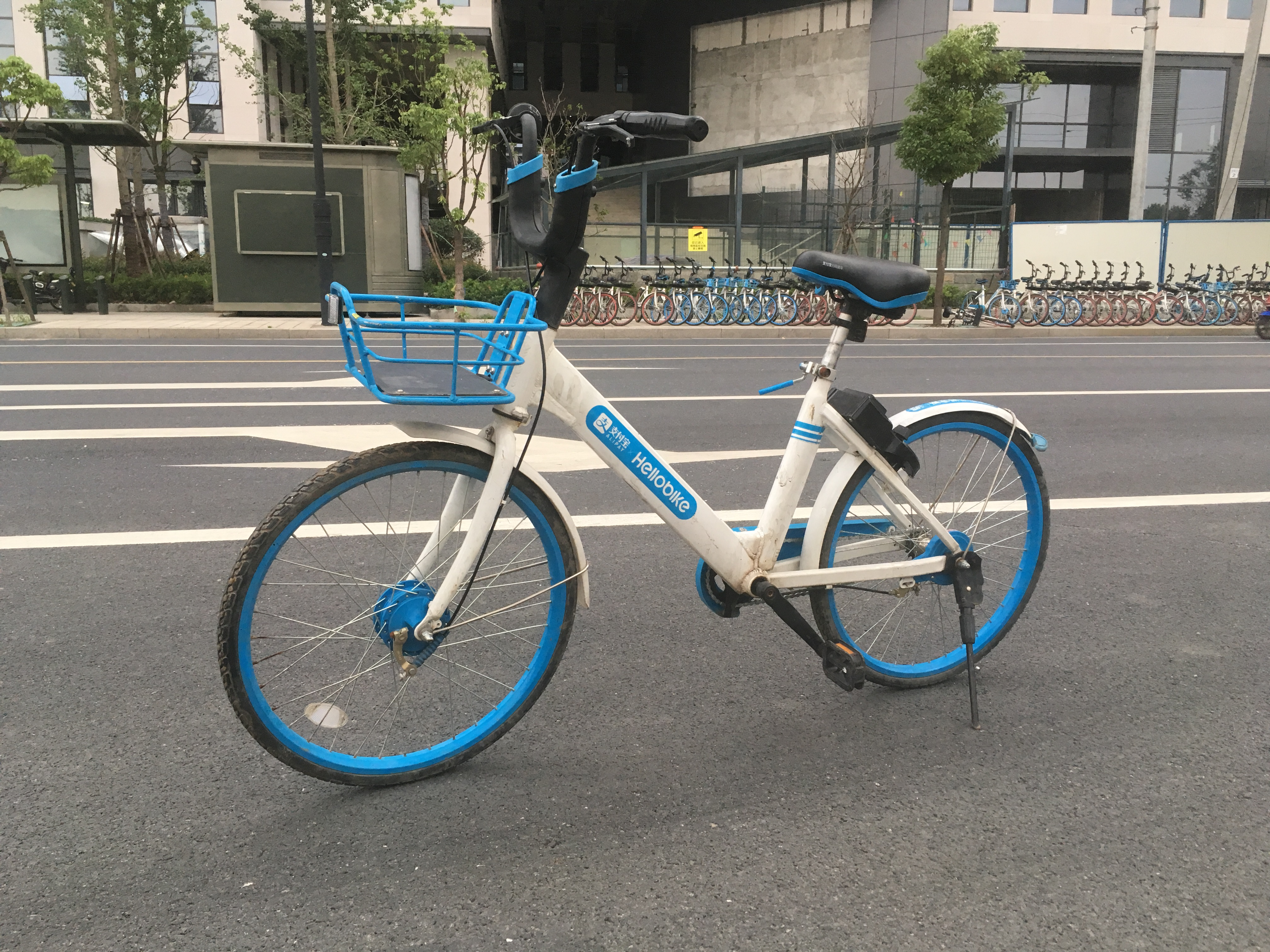
Hellobike bicycles in Hangzhou, 2018

During this period, China's bike-sharing industry was highly competitive, with many companies lowering prices and sacrificing profitability in an attempt to rapidly gain market share. Subsequently, the sector underwent significant consolidation in the late 2010s, with a large number of early operators collapsing or leaving the market. Hellobike became one of the few major companies to survive the burst of China's bike-sharing bubble.

=== Funding and growth ===
In a series of fundraising rounds dating back to 2016, Hellobike has raised over US$1.8 billion from investors. Ant Group, the company's largest single investor, holds an estimated 36 percent share in Hellobike. In 2018, the company renamed itself as HelloChuxing. By 2020, it emerged as one of the China's largest bike-sharing operators, alongside Meituan Bike and Didi Qingju, with approximately 8 million bikes in China's smaller cities and towns.

=== Diversification ===
In addition to bike-sharing, the company has expanded into a wider range of services. In 2018, it partnered with Chinese battery maker CATL in entering the electric scooter rental sector. In 2019, it formed a US$145 million joint venture with CATL to develop an electric bicycle battery-swapping network, that would enable customers to replace and recharge e-bike batteries. By 2020, it had entered the taxi- and ride-hailing industry.

=== International expansion ===
In 2022, the company rebranded itself from HelloChuxing to Hello along with a new slogan - "Accompanying you every day". It also launched its international arm under the brand name HelloRide, marking the company's overseas expansion. HelloRide operates in regions including Singapore, Malaysia, Hong Kong, and Australia, offering shared and rental bicycles.

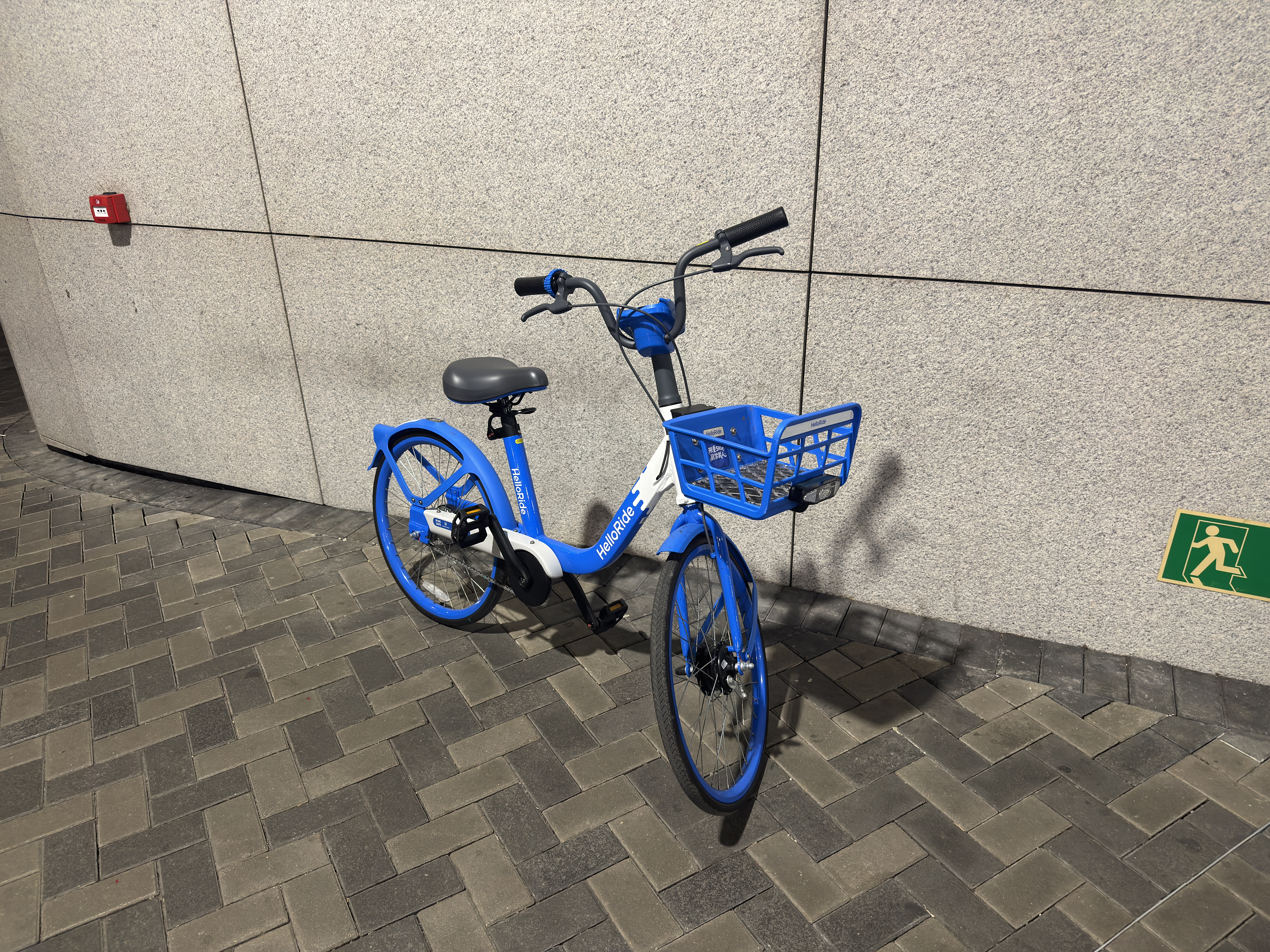
A HelloRide bicycle at Tung Chung Station in Hong Kong

=== Robotaxi venture ===
In 2025, Hello announced it has entered the robotaxi sector and signed a US$422.3 million joint venture with Ant Group and CATL. The new venture, registered as Shanghai Zaofu Intelligent Technology Co., Ltd on June 23, 2025, is focused on the development and commercialization of Level 4 autonomous driving technology. In the same year, Hello also entered into a strategic agreement with Horizon Robotics and Alibaba Group to support the development of the new venture. Hello is a relative latecomer to the robotaxi sector and faces strong competition in the Chinese market that includes Baidu, WeRide and Pony.ai.

== Products and Operations ==
=== Mainland China ===
Hello provides a range of mobility services which are broadly divided into two-wheeled and four-wheeled transport groups. The company operates a digital platform that integrates its transportation services within a single mobile app ecosystem and is also accessed via the Alipay platform.

==== Two-wheeled mobility ====
Hello operates electric scooter services under its Hello Scooters brand. It also provides shared bikes and electric bike rentals. In addition, the company is involved in battery-swapping infrastructure through the Xiaoha Power Exchange joint venture with Ant Group and CATL, which enables users to exchange and access charged e-bike batteries.

==== Four-wheeled mobility ====
Hello provides ride-hailing, carpooling, and car rental services.

=== International ===
Hello operates bicycle-sharing services internationally under the HelloRide brand, with deployments across Asia and Oceania.

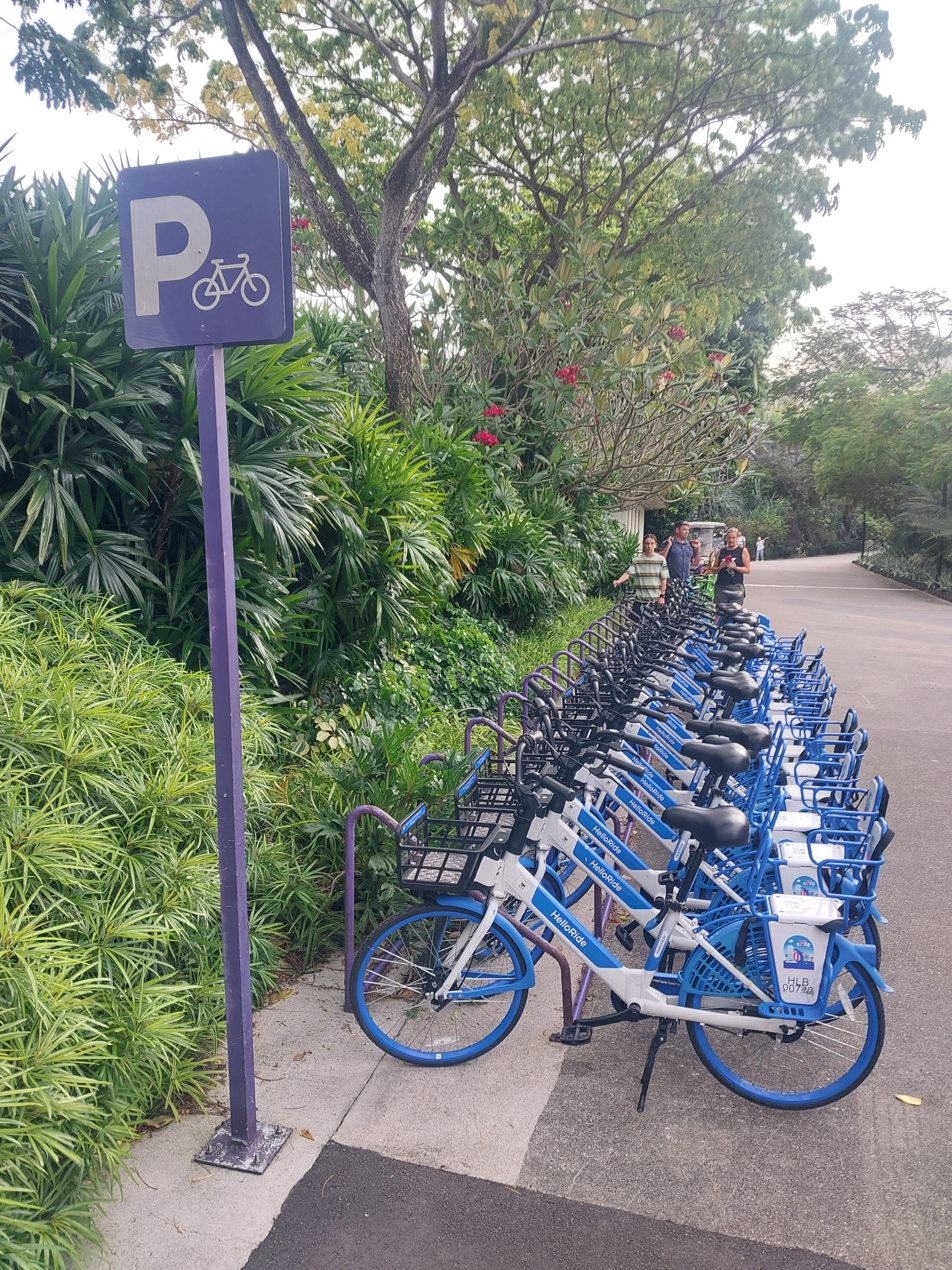
Bicycle rental station for HelloRide bikes in Singapore (January 2025)

==== Singapore ====
In Singapore, following approval by the Land Transport Authority (LTA) in July 2022, HelloRide operates a licensed bicycle-sharing service that consists of up to 20,000 bicycles.

==== Hong Kong ====
In Hong Kong, HelloRide operates in a number of districts, including Tuen Mun, Yuen Long, Tung Chung, Sheung Shui, Tai Po, Sha Tin and Tseung Kwan O.

==== Malaysia ====
In Malaysia, HelloRide operates bicycle-sharing services in Kuala Lumpur.

==== Australia ====
In Australia, HelloRide currently operates bicycle-sharing services in Sydney, with plans to expand into Queensland, Victoria, and the Northern Territory.
