= OBike =

Bicycle sharing company

oBike
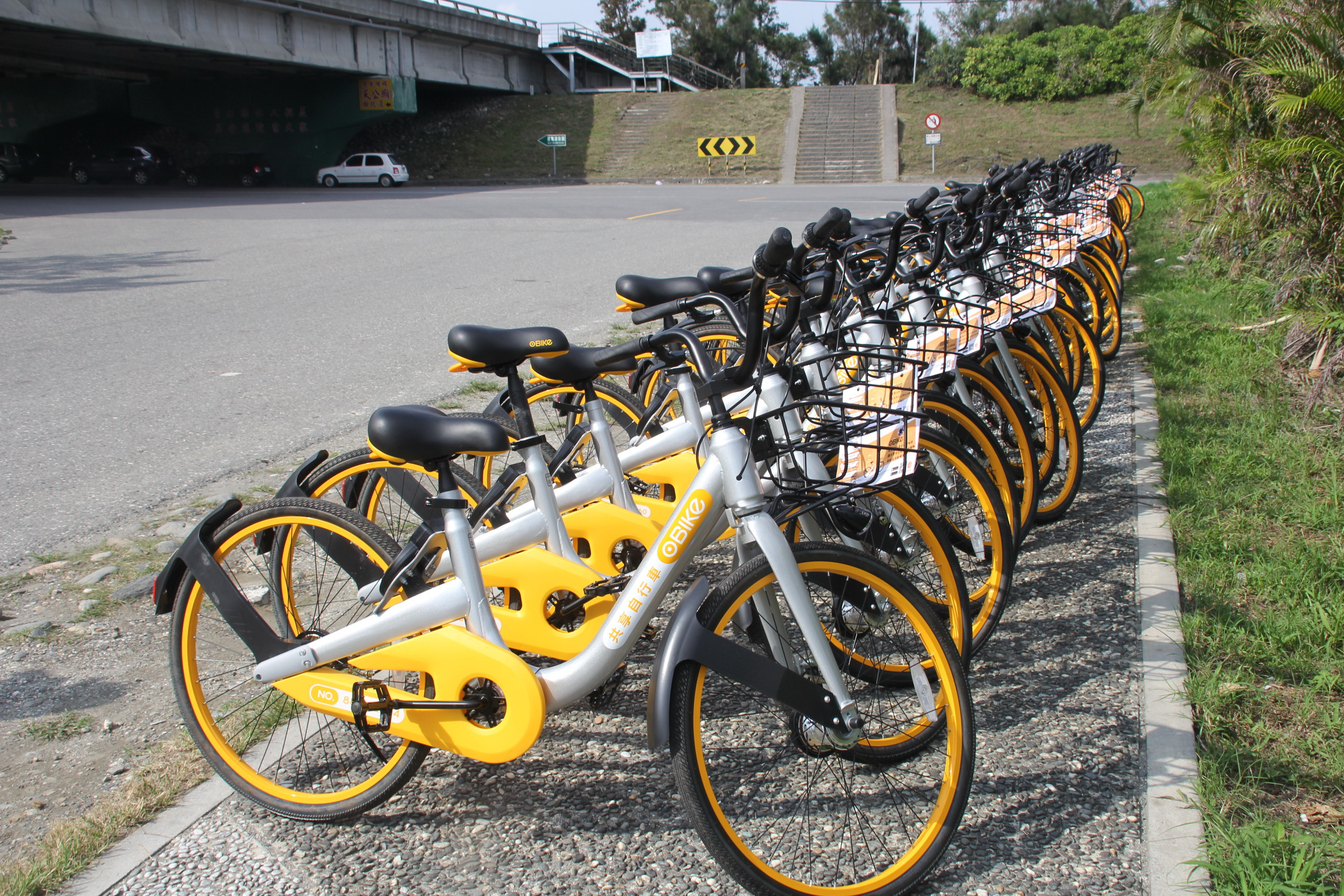
- Industry: Transportation
- Founded: February 2017 (original); November 2019; 7 years ago
- Founders: Yi Shi, Edward Chen
- Headquarters: Singapore
- Areas served: Singapore; Australia; Austria; France; Germany; Hong Kong; Italy; Korea; Malaysia; Netherlands; Portugal; Sweden; Spain; Taiwan; Thailand; United Kingdom
- Products: Bicycle sharing services
- Website: o.bike

oBike was a Singapore-registered stationless bicycle-sharing system started by businessmen Yi Shi and Edward Chen with operations in several countries. The bikes have a built-in Bluetooth lock and can therefore be left anywhere at the end of a journey, not just at a docking station. Users use a smartphone app to locate and rent bikes. It launched in Singapore in February 2017, and ceased operation on 25 June 2018 in Singapore. Subsequently, the parent company filed for insolvency in its home market. The effect on operations outside of Singapore is unknown.

The firm had expanded to 24 countries including Australia, Korea, Malaysia, Thailand, Taiwan, Austria, Belgium, France, Germany, Italy, the Netherlands, Portugal, Sweden, Switzerland, the United Kingdom.

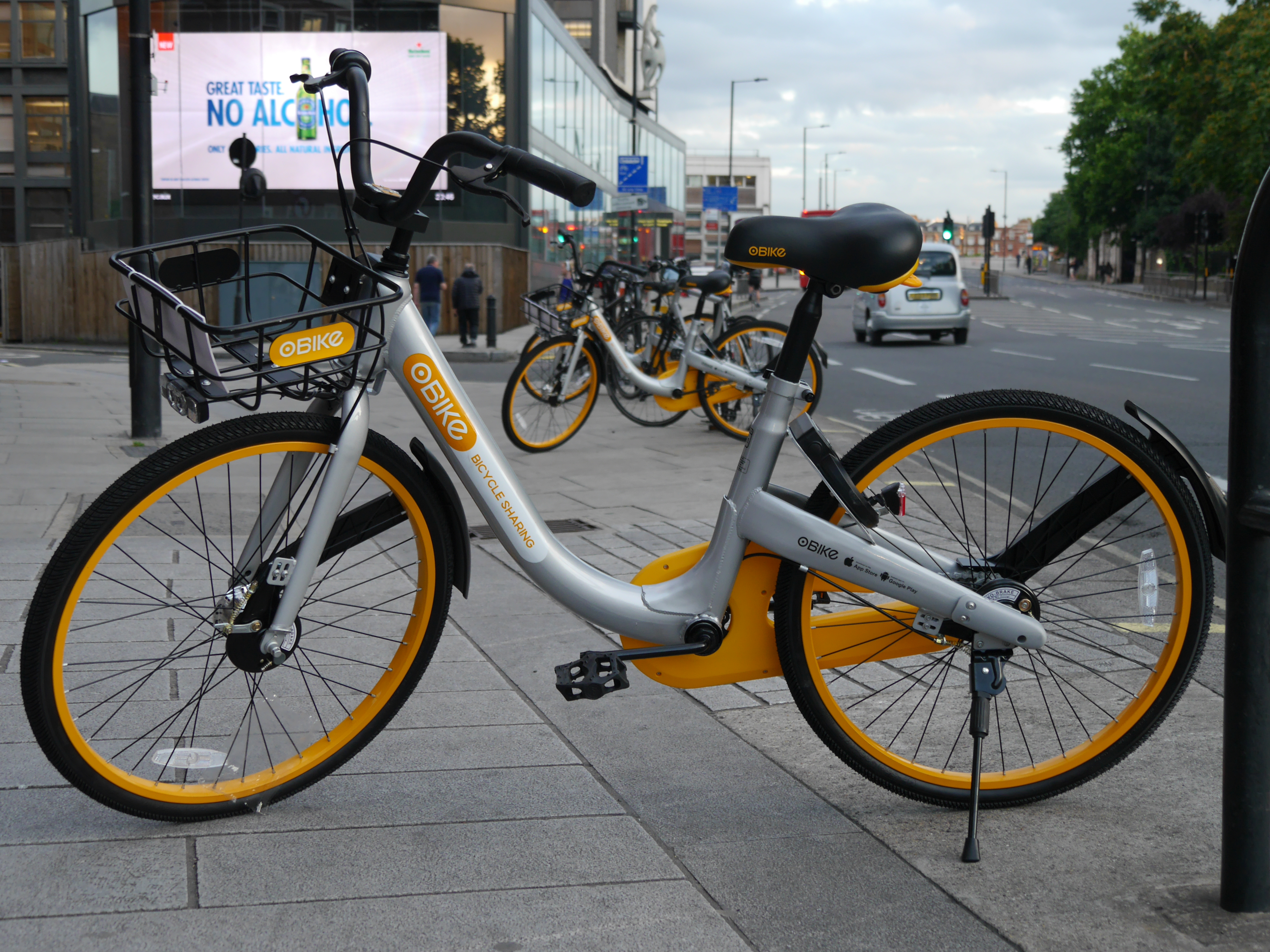
oBikes, Putney Bridge Approach, London, July 2017

== The system ==
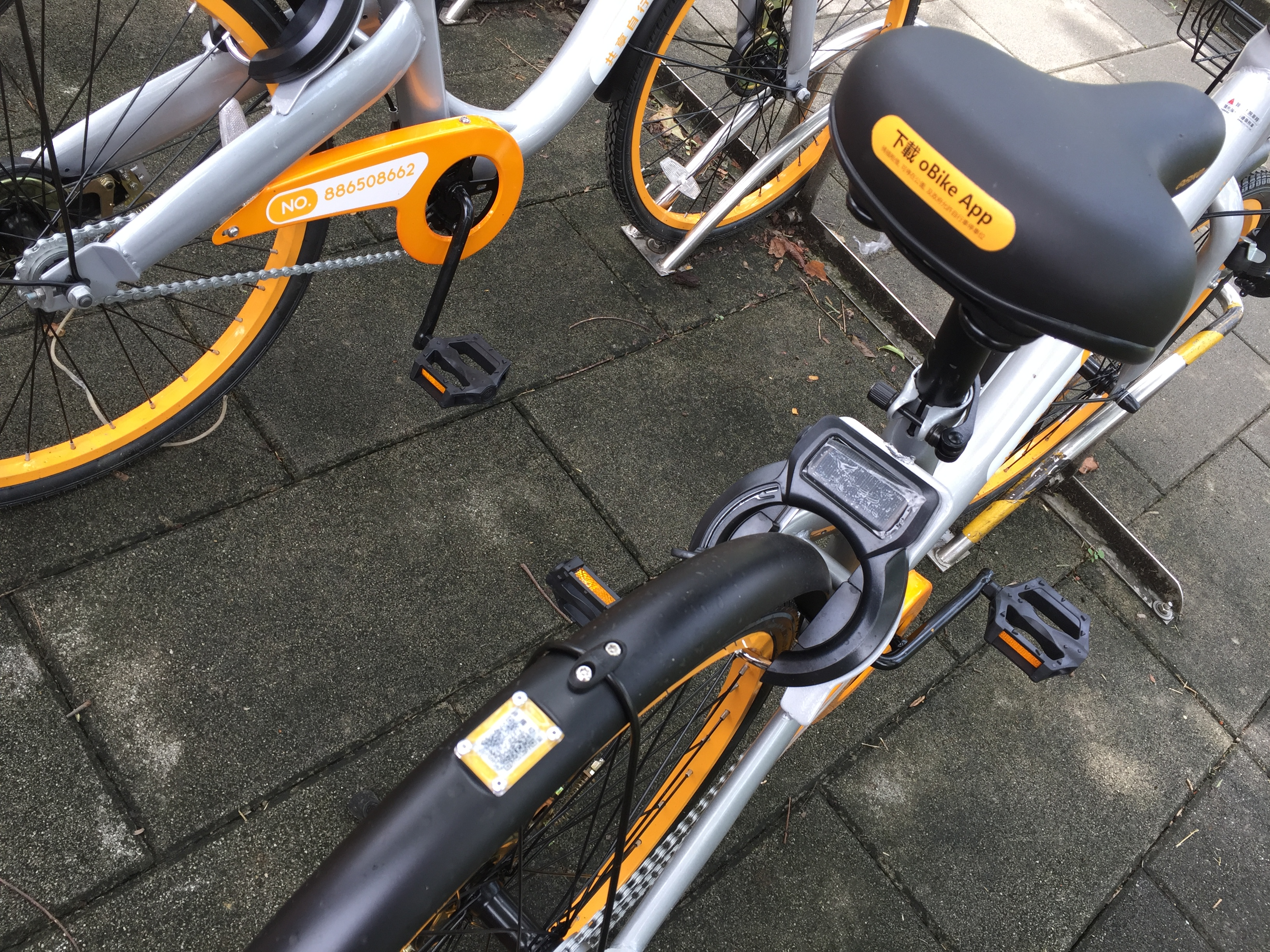
The Lock of oBike.

The bicycles were single speed with a plastic chainguard, short mudguards on both wheels, front and rear rim brakes, and dynamo electric lights.

To make use of the system, the user had to download the oBike application, register and pay a deposit. The App was used to rent and return the bicycles and users were charged by 15 or 30 minutes, with payment charged to their Credit/Debit card. To ride bikes, users needed to have an internet connection and Bluetooth enabled on their mobile device to enable unlocking of their desired oBike, which was done by scanning the QR code or entering the corresponding bicycle number. If successful, the lock on the rear wheel opened automatically. Once users finished with their ride, they needed to manually lock and leave the bike in any parking spot to be ready for the next user. At the time of locking the bike, the user must again ensure they had a Bluetooth and an internet connection, in order for the oBike system to record the end of the ride and correctly calculate the hire charge. If violations were reported, a credit system penalized the corresponding user after a certain number of times, and in extreme cases, the user could be suspended from the platform. At the beginning of 2018 oBike entered into a partnership with TRON. In addition customers of oBike could use the app to pay with a Cryptocurrency called ″oCoin″ which the company planned to offer.

== Areas serviced ==
=== Asia ===
==== Singapore ====
When oBike first started its operations in Singapore in 2017, 1,000 oBike bicycles were rolled out across the city. One month later, the Singapore Land Transport Authority rolled out bicycle parking zones in seven areas and in April, the company officially launched. Tampines Town Council was their partner for the Ride and Roll programme.

On 25 June 2018, oBike announced that they were exiting the Singaporean market as they are unable to meet new legislation addressing indiscriminate parking of bikes. Under the new rules set by the Land Transport Authority, operators will have to pay a S$30 licensing fee and a S$30 security deposit for every bicycle they deploy and a S$1,500 one-time application fee.

==== Malaysia ====
Launched in the Federal Territory of Kuala Lumpur. oBike was appointed as the KL2017 official green initiative partner, and was part of the biggest sporting event in the Southeast Asia region by providing bicycles all around KL2017 venues in Klang Valley in a bid to encourage people to preserve the environment.

==== Korea ====
Launched in Seoul in early 2017.

==== Thailand ====
Launched in Bangkok in July 2017.

==== Hong Kong ====
oBike launched in Hong Kong on 15 September 2017, with 1,000 bikes available in Tung Chung, Yuen Long, Tuen Mun and Tseung Kwan O, becoming the third operator provides bike-sharing service in Hong Kong. Bike hire in Hong Kong area is HK$3 for 15 minutes, with a HK$350 deposit being required.

==== Taiwan ====
oBike’s Bicycle-sharing system began operations in Taiwan during April 2017 under the management of Taiwan's Aozhi Network Technology Co., Ltd. As of 20 June 2017, oBike has set up shop in the cities of Keelung, New Taipei, Taipei, Hsinchu, Tainan and Kaohsiung as well as the counties of Nantou, Yilan, Hualien and Taitung.

oBike's managing company in Taiwan, Aozhi Network Technology, stopped oBike's activities in Taiwan in June 2018 and actually owe 18.57 million Taiwan dollars only in impound and custody fees.

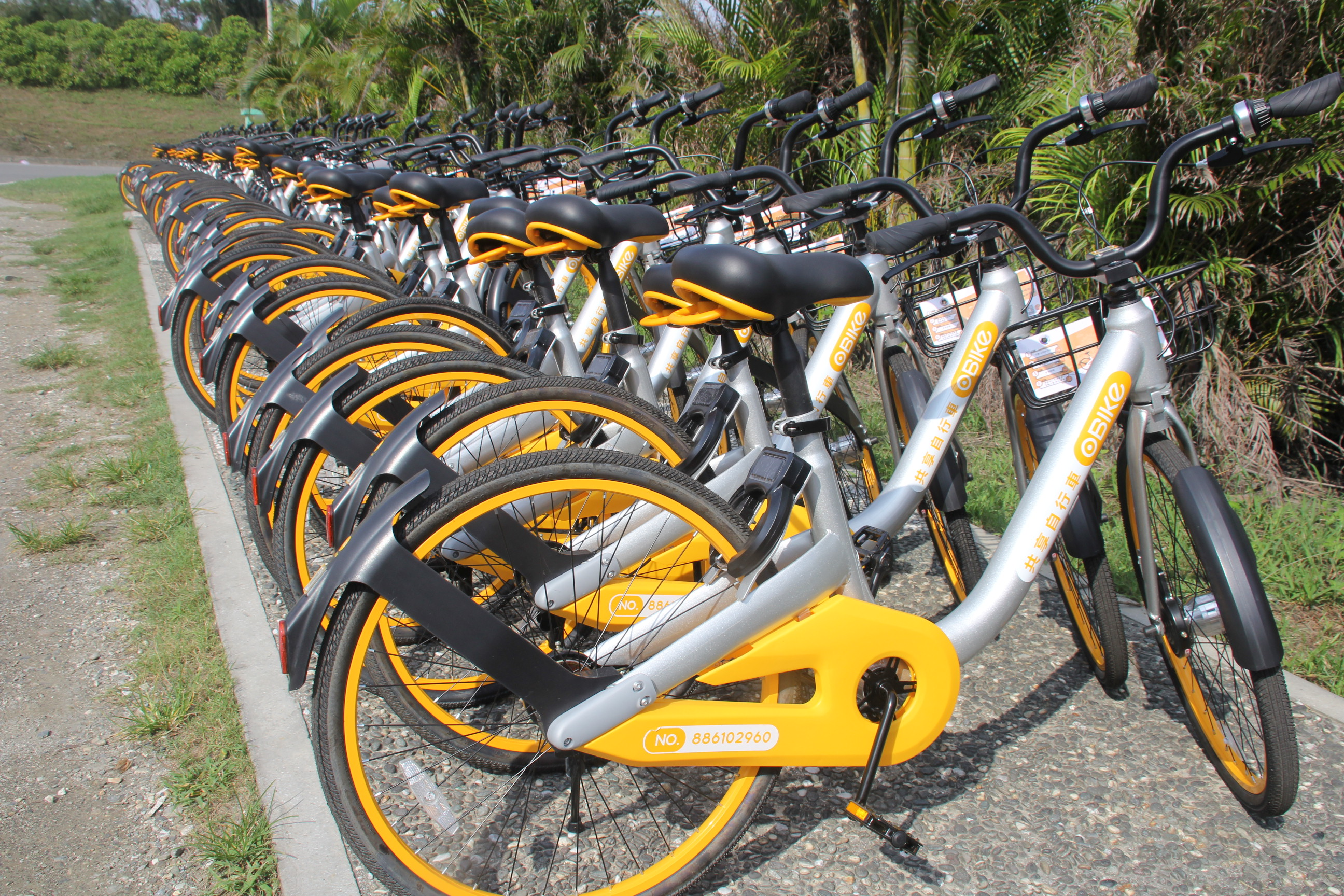
oBikes, Taitung, Taiwan

=== Australia ===
oBike launched in Melbourne, Australia in June 2017. At the end of August 2017 the Melbourne City Council began impounding the bikes, declaring them visual pollution after they were found on a raft in Albert Park Lake, up trees, on railway tracks, and on top of toilet blocks. Lord Mayor Robert Doyle described them as "urban clutter" but did not take any action in regards to banning them. oBikes were found submerged in the Yarra River. Filmmaker Tommy Jackett released a video on social media "Fishing For O Bikes In The Yarra River". oBike was later requested to hire external contractors by Parks Victoria to recover the bikes. The month of September saw more than 40 bikes being removed from the river. In August 2017, oBike launched in Sydney. By October 2017, there were similar complaints of oBikes being left in trees, parks and other public places. oBike announced it would cease operations in Melbourne after the city council was given the right to fine the company $3,000 every time it failed to comply with tighter regulations from the Victorian Environment Protection Authority.

oBike also operated in Adelaide (ceased), Brisbane, Sydney, and The Gold Coast, but current status of these operations is unknown.

=== Europe ===
==== Austria ====
oBikes were introduced in Vienna on 17 August 2017. Bike hire cost €1 for 30 minutes. On 1 August 2018, Viennese authorities effectively banned oBikes. It was reported that 780 bikes had been seized, representing virtually all such bikes in the Austrian capital.

==== Belgium ====
oBike started its service on 22 September 2017 in Brussels. The bike hire is €1/30 minutes. As of June 2018, there are few bikes left around the city and it doesn't seem possible to rent them using the app. The company is also not responding to queries.

==== Germany ====
oBike launched in Munich on 24 August 2017 and Hanover on 15 November 2017. They had to withdraw 6000 bikes from Munich already. Bike hire is €1/30 minutes with a €79 deposit (€29 for students). The sale of oBikes was banned by the state of Schleswig-Holstein in September 2018.

==== Italy ====
oBike launched in Turin on 17 November 2017. The bike hire is €0.50/30 minutes after the initial free trial period ended on 31 December 2017 and a brief period at €0.30/30 minutes. oBike was also available in municipalities I and II of Rome as of March 2018. The bike hire is €0.50/30 minutes. oBike left the city of Rome due to vandalism reasons.

==== Netherlands ====
The Netherlands is oBike's first European market. It officially launched in Rotterdam in June 2017 and Amsterdam in July 2017, and was banned from Amsterdam in October 2017. Bike hire is €0.25 per 15 minutes with a €79 deposit (€49 for students).

==== Portugal ====
oBike launched in Lisbon in February 2017 with 350 bikes at a cost of €0.50 per 30 minutes of bike rental.

==== Spain ====
oBike launched in Madrid in September 2017, operated by oBike Spain, SL.

==== Sweden ====
oBike launched in Stockholm on 15 November 2017. The bike hire cost 10 SEK per 30 minutes after the initial free winter trial period.

==== Switzerland ====
oBike launched in Zürich in July 2017, operated by oBike Swiss Ltd. It originally deployed approximately 350 bikes and soon after increased to 900. Bike hire is CHF 1.50 for 30 minutes with a CHF 129 deposit. Meanwhile oBike has stopped its service in Switzerland.

==== United Kingdom ====
In July 2017, oBike launched in London with 400 bikes. Bike hire was 50p for 30 minutes with a £49 deposit. oBike's operations in London were put on hiatus at the end of 2017

== Controversy ==
=== Australia ===
After oBike has announced it ceased operations in Melbourne, there were reports of many users being unable to get their deposits back, or having their deposits unwillingly converted to VIP subscriptions. Furthermore, the app was redesigned to prevent people from requesting refunds.

=== Malaysia ===
In March 2019, the Kuala Lumpur City Hall authorities announced a strict ultimatum for the oBike company owners to claim the thousands of abandoned oBike bicycles by mid-April that is currently piled up in a depot or otherwise be destroyed or turned to scrap. It is believed that the oBike Malaysia company has shut down its operations; and are uncontactable by the media or authorities.

Complaints include that the bikes were not sturdy, poorly maintained and had no parking facilities. Bikes collected by the authorities were found in every nook and cranny of the city including the river, back alleys and clogging drains.

=== Singapore ===
In 2018, after oBike shut down operations in Singapore, its bicycles are left abandoned on the streets. On 28 June, 2018 the Land Transport Authority instructed the company to remove the bikes by 4 July or they will be charged for the towing and storage service. oBike's provisional liquidator, FTI Consulting, subsequently removed the bicycles as part of their commitments to Land Transport Authority remove them. On The Consumers Association of Singapore also told customers to keep proof of debt while the company assets are liquidated. oBike chairman Yi Shi told Lianhe Zaobao that he is willing to use his shares to bear the cost of refunding users' deposit. He also said that the company's ability to refund users will be affected if the Land Transport Authority imposed fines on them, implying that the deposits which are to be refunded will be used to pay off the fines instead.

Users with $19/$49 deposits were unable to gain a refund via the Obike app after they removed the refund button with an app update. Contacts through other means were ignored as well.

Before oBike withdrew from Singapore, it transferred the deposits owed to the Singapore users to its sister company, oBike Hong Kong. oBike was then investigated for misappropriation of funds and was deemed not to have committed any offence in September 2021.

=== Taiwan ===
==== Bicycles parking in car parking spots ====
oBike bicycles parking in normal automobile parking caused public complaints. The Keelung City Government, Taipei City Government and Yilan County Government have since stated that bicycles can legally park in automobile spots. On 7 July 2017 the New Taipei City Government Transportation Department announced a ban on rental bicycles parking in automobile spots in the districts of Sanchong, Tucheng, Zhonghe and 11 other districts as well as bicycle parking spots around MRT stations, train stations and other public transportation areas.

==== Other ====
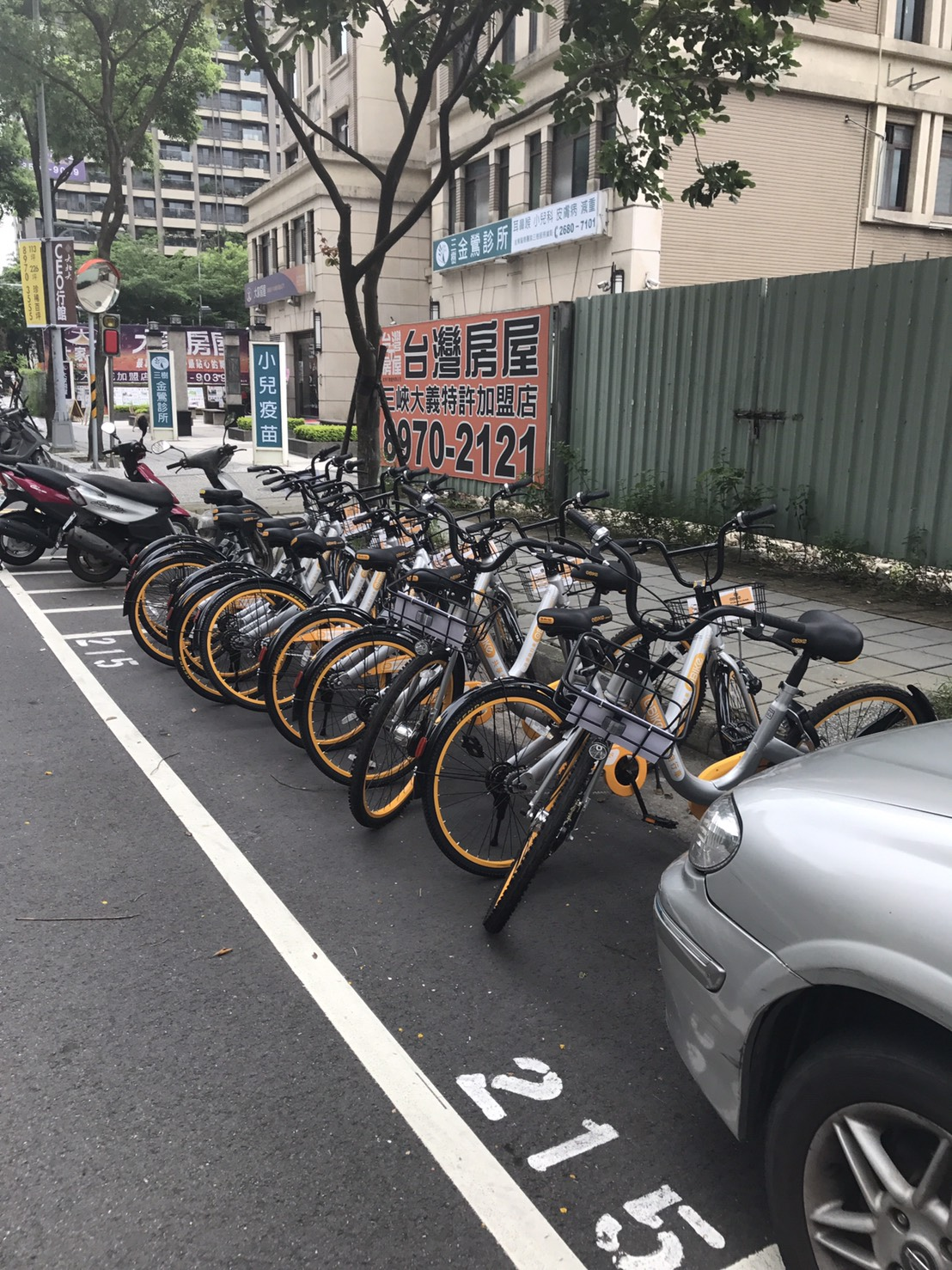
oBikes parked in automobile parking spots

In April 2017 during its trial period, several instances of parking violations in Taipei; The Taipei City Government Transportation Department required oBike to reach an agreement with the city before continuing operations.

In May 2017, in the county of Taitung, the Taitung Police Department discovered many people parking illegally; in the county of Hualien, oBike bicycles were parked on the sidewalk in front of the Yuli Train Station, inciting complaints from the public; in the city of Tainan, the government made oBike undergo an audit before continuing operations; in the county of Yilian, oBike bicycles were parked on pedestrian walkways and in automobile parking spots. Jiang Congyuan, the mayor of Yilian, stated that if the company does not control this, they will begin confiscating the bicycles. On 31 May, the city of Yilian confiscated 34 illegally parked bicycles.

=== Germany ===
In March 2018, oBike announced the withdrawal of the majority of bikes from Munich. The city accused the firm of making mistakes in the rollout of the service which left bikes vandalised and obstructing the city. 12,000 oBikes already sold in the northern state of Schleswig-Holstein will have to be called back after the state ministry for consumer protection banned their sale in September 2018. The reason for the ban was a lack of roadworthiness because of poor brake performance.

=== Portugal ===
One month later, oBike ceased its services in Lisbon due to alleged abusive occupation of space within the city and lack of a municipal license to operate.

=== Switzerland ===
In June 2018, oBike announced the withdrawal of its bike fleet from Zurich. According to news reports, the low quality of the bikes, vandalism, the aggressive initial roll-out and controversies about the company's data collection and privacy policy forced oBike to withdraw all of its bikes. By November 2017, the company had stopped paying the local delivery and service companies which were hired to maintain the local bike fleet.

=== United Kingdom ===
In Hammersmith and Fulham the local authority placed obstruction notices on some oBikes parked on the public highway or "littering" the city.

== See also ==
- Bicycle-sharing system
- List of bicycle-sharing systems
- Mobike
- Ofo
