= Meituan Bike =

Chinese bicycle sharing company

Beijing Mobike Technology Co., Ltd
- Industry: Transportation
- Founded: 27 January 2015; 11 years ago Beijing, China
- Founder: Hu Weiwei (CEO); Davis Wang (Former CEO); Xia Yiping (Smart Traffic Lab Head)
- Headquarters: Chaoyang District, Beijing, China
- Area served: China 200+ Cities; Japan Fuji, Oiso, Nara; Italy Florence, Turin, Milan, Bergamo, Mantua, Cremona, Pesaro, Reggio Emilia, Bologna, Lignano Sabbiadoro, Padua; Albania Tirana; United Kingdom London, Oxford, Cambridge; Netherlands Delft, Rotterdam; Thailand Bangkok, Chiang Mai; South Korea Suwon; Mexico Mexico City, Aguascalientes, León; Chile Santiago (Las Condes, La Reina, Lo Barnechea, Ñuñoa, Providencia, Vitacura); Germany Berlin, Düsseldorf, Cologne, Hanover; Malaysia Cyberjaya; France Paris; Australia Sydney, Gold Coast; United States Charlotte (NC), San Diego; Israel Tel Aviv, Ramat Gan, Givatayim, Rehovot, Kiryat Bialik, Kiryat Motzkin, Tzoran-Kadima; India Pune; Spain Madrid, Catalonia, Zaragoza
- Key people: Davis Wang (Co-founder & former CEO); Hu Weiwei (Founder & former CEO); Eric Yu Liu (President & former CEO); Wang Xing (Chairman)
- Products: Dock-less bicycle sharing services
- Parent: Meituan-Dianping
- Website: mobike.com

Meituan Bike
- Simplified Chinese: 摩拜单车
- Traditional Chinese: 摩拜單車
- Literal meaning: Modern + Worship + Bike (derived from Mobike co-founder Davis Wang's Beijing Worship Technology Co., Ltd)
Transcriptions
Standard Mandarin
- Hanyu Pinyin: mó bài dān chē

Meituan Bike, formerly Mobike, founded by Beijing Mobike Technology Co., Ltd. (Chinese: 北京摩拜科技有限公司), is a fully station-less bicycle-sharing system originating in Beijing, China. At its peak, it was, by the number of bicycles, the world's largest shared (for hire) bicycle operator, and made Hangzhou the world's largest bike-share city in September 2015. In April 2018, it was wholly acquired by a Chinese web company Meituan-Dianping for US$2.7 billion. On 14 December, 2020, the Mobike mobile app and WeChat mini program were discontinued, with all bicycles and operations migrated to the Meituan app and under the Meituan Bike brand.

== History ==
In 2015, Mobike was established by a former journalist Hu Weiwei. Co-founder Wang Xiaofeng, the general manager for the Shanghai office of Uber also known by his English name Davis Wang, became Mobike's CEO. Not being able to purchase bikes from suppliers to the preferred specifications, the company built its own bikes which were rolled out from April 2016.

In December 2016, the company made Shanghai the world's largest bike-share city.

In June 2017, Mobike raised $600 million USD in Series E funding led by Tencent, bringing the firm's fund raising in 2017 alone to nearly US$1 billion. In the same month, the company was valued at US$3 billion.

In April 2018, the firm was acquired by a Chinese web company Meituan-Dianping for US$2.7 billion.

In August 2018, Mobike launched an electric version of their orange bicycle.

In December 2018, Hu Weiwei resigned as chief executive for "personal reasons" and was replaced by Eric Yu Liu.

== Coverage ==
As of 2018, Mobike had operated in over 200 cities and 19 countries around the world.

=== Asia ===
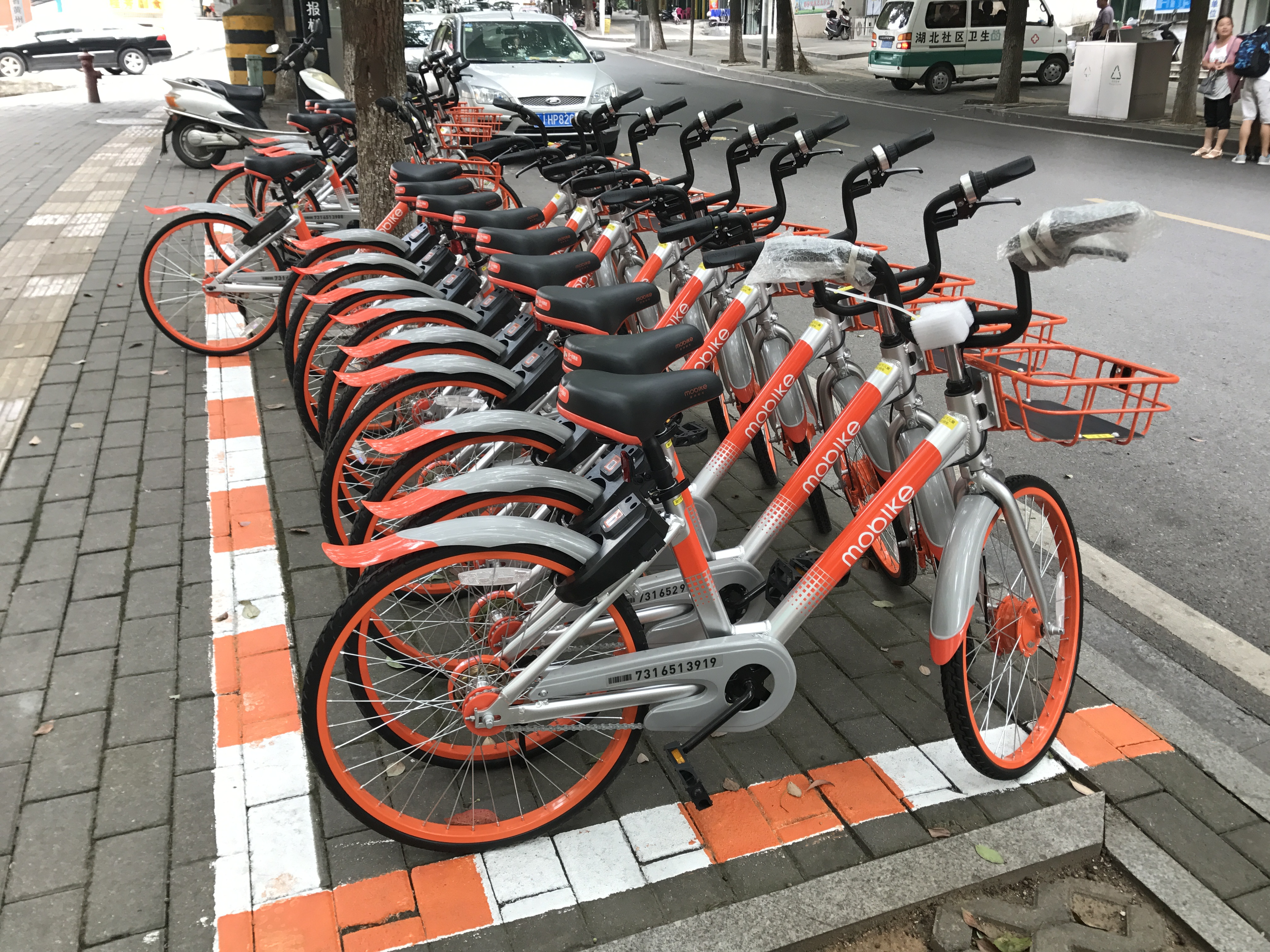
Mobike bikes in Huanggang, Hubei, China

Mobike operates in Chinese cities include but are not limited to Beijing, Shanghai, Guangzhou, Shenzhen, Chengdu, Lanzhou, Ningbo, Xiamen, Foshan, Zhuhai, Changsha, Hefei, Shantou, Haikou, Deyang, Nanning, Guiyang, Xi'an, Wenzhou, and Wuhan.

On 21 March 2017, Mobike started operations in Singapore, the company's first overseas market.

Mobike Japan was launched on 22 June 2017, Fukuoka being its first recipient. In Osaka, to gain traction for its e-bike business, Panasonic partnered with Chinese Mobike to explore the possibilities of an electric-bike-sharing service in Japan.

On 31 August 2017, Mobike announced its official launch in Thailand with its partnership with AIS, Central Pattana and Kasertsat University. At the beginning of 2018, Mobike Thailand team launched its second city as Chiang Mai – Northern Thailand's largest city. Mobike's launch is directly in line with the city government's "Non-Motorised Transport" (NMT) initiative, which focuses on promoting ecotourism through the development of a sustainable urban transport system. Mobike ceased operations in Chiang Mai in mid-2019.

On 6 September 2017, Mobike officially launched in Malaysia, with the first bikes being rolled out in Setia Alam and Cyberjaya just a month later.

In November 2017 and February 2018, Mobike launched its service in Sydney and the Gold Coast, Queensland, Australia respectively.

In May 2018, Mobike launched its operations in Israel in cities including Tel Aviv, Ramat Gan, Givatayim, Rehovot and Kiryat Bialik.

On 11 March 2019, Mobike requested to surrender its bicycle sharing license and cease all operation in Singapore. The AP reported that Mobike was shutting down operations in South and Southeastern Asia following the footsteps of rival Ofo who had already begun winding down its international division. The remaining 25,000 bikes are handed over to SG Bike on 13 September 2019 after approval from Singapore's Land Transport Authority.

=== Europe ===
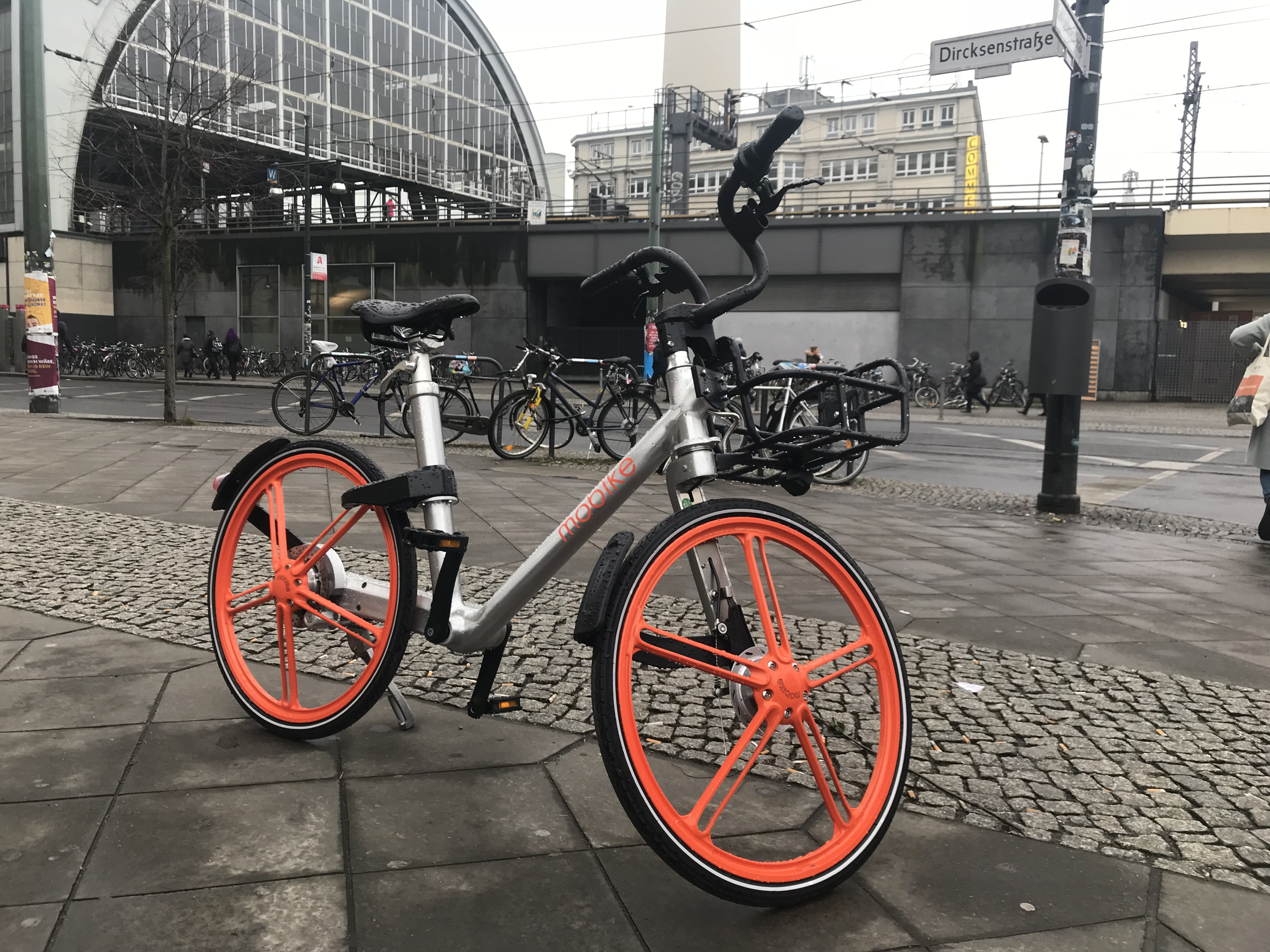
A Mobike bicycle at Alexanderplatz, Berlin

In the summer of 2017, Mobike launched its service in Manchester, UK. It was Mobike's 100th city, and the first outside of Asia. In September 2017, Mobike extended its service to London, quickly followed by launching in Newcastle. In October 2017, Mobike entered Oxford. In June 2018, Mobike launched in Cambridge. In September 2018, Mobike announced that it was to suspend its operations in Manchester. The company said that it had suffered increased bike losses dues to theft and vandalism in the city. In 2019, service was also suspended in Newcastle, but continued to operate bikesharing in London, Oxford and Cambridge. Mobike has since ceased all UK operations.

In Italy, Mobike began operations initially in Florence in July 2017, followed by Milan in August, Turin and Bergamo in November, Pesaro and Mantua in March 2018, Reggio Emilia in May and Bologna in June.

On 9 November 2017 Mobike officially launched in Rotterdam, The Netherlands. The ceremony was attended by Chantal Blaak, the 2017 world champion cycling women's road race. Mobike extended its service in the Netherlands in June 2018 with the launch of Mobike in Delft. In March 2019, Mobike launched in The Hague.

In Germany, Mobike launched its operations on 21 November 2017 by deploying 700 bicycles in Berlin, making it the 200th city worldwide with Mobike's bicycle sharing operations. Mobike quickly expanded in Germany by launching in Düsseldorf in May 2018, followed by Cologne in July 2018 and Hannover in September 2018. On 1 August 2020 the German-based Mobike GmbH filed for insolvency.

In France, the service was launched in Paris on 24 January 2018. In December 2018, Mobike and Transdev announced an exclusive partnership aiming at proposing Mobike to other French municipalities as complementary offer to public transport networks managed by Transdev.

In Spain, began its first operations in Madrid on 18 June 2018. Spain was Mobike's 19th country of operation, and was in support of the city's urban mobility strategy, calling for increased use of low carbon transportation. In September 2018, Mobike entered the l'Hospitalet de Llobregat thanks to an agreement with the city council. L'Hospitalet is a neighboring city to Barcelona, is Europe's second most densely populated city. On 26 September 2018, Mobike launched in Zaragoza, becoming the company's third city in Spain. In February 2019, Mobike was awarded permission to launch electronic scooters in Madrid.

In Albania, this bike-sharing system was launched in Tirana on 8 June 2018, but in the beginning of 2020 the service resulted unavailable.

=== Americas ===
On 20 September 2017, Mobike's first bike-sharing service in the United States started from Washington, D.C. However, Mobike however pulled out of Washington, D.C. after less than a year of service, in July 2018. Mobike launched in Charlotte, North Carolina on 22 December 2017 and in San Diego on 23 February 2018. Operations in The Woodlands, Texas started in January 2018 and ceased in October 2018.

In February 2018, Mobike launched its operations in Mexico City and Santiago, Chile.

=== Australia ===
In March 2019, Mobike announced that it was ceasing operations in Australia.

== Design features ==
As described by the company, Mobike is intended to solve the last mile issue in which commuters face the problem of being stuck a bit too far from their destination to walk, but too close to justify the cost or delay of finding a taxi. Similar to Call a Bike in Germany, every Mobike bicycle comes with an internet-controlled electronic wheel lock that automatically unlocks but requires manual locking after use.

Mobike bicycles are powered by a small generator installed on the rear wheel hub to power the lock, or by a PV panel in some bike models. The patented disc brake is said to withstand over 10,000 kilometres of riding without failure.

Mobike has partnered with Qualcomm (using their IoT chip MDM9206) and Gemalto for the use of NB-IoT technologies to provide connection for the bikes.

Mobike bicycles come in two versions, both of which requires a scan of a unique QR-code to unlock:

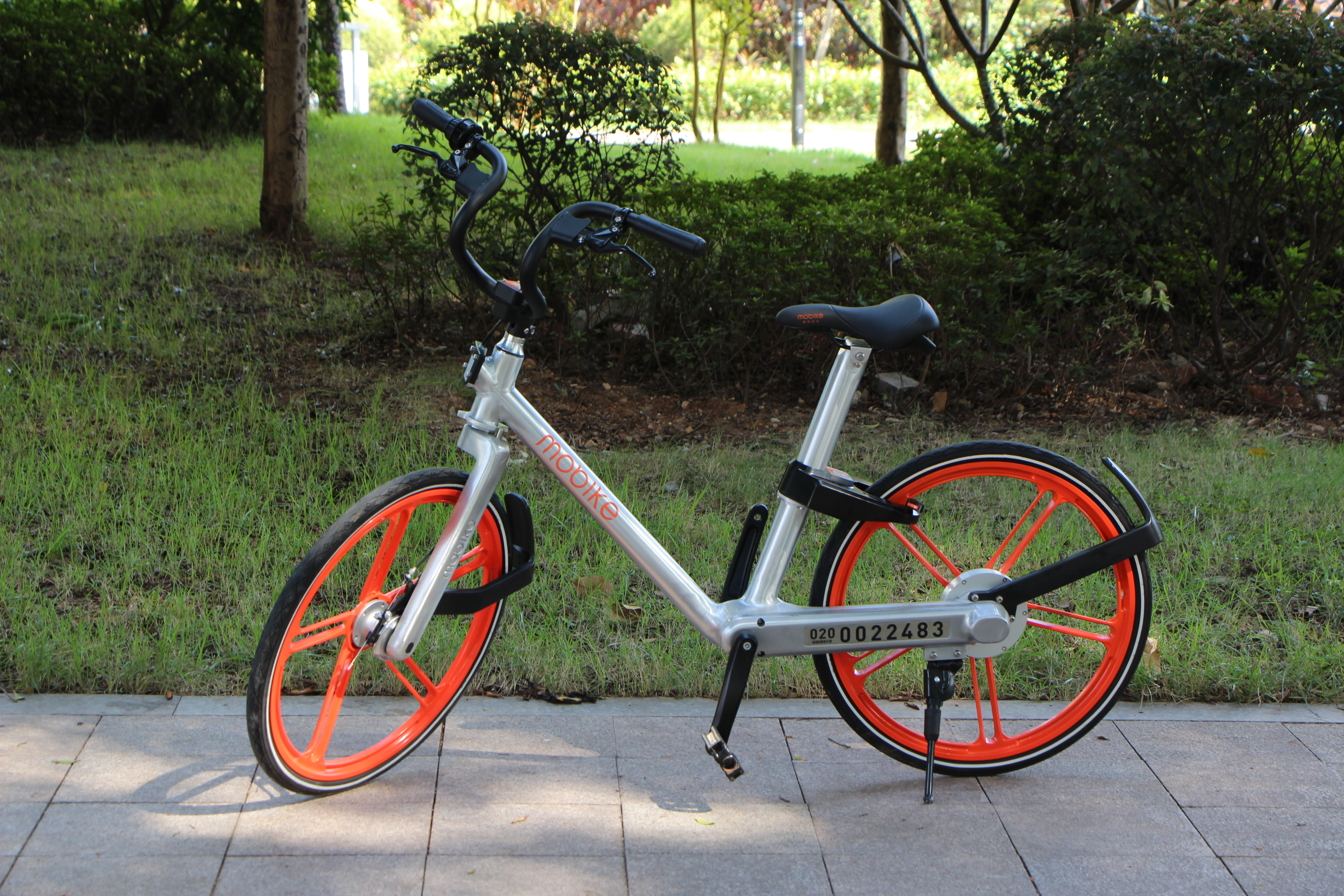
A Classic Mobike showing its identification number. Here the smaller "020" means a bike assigned to Guangzhou, Guangdong.

=== Classic Mobike ===
The Classic Mobike, or "Mobike", is the standard variant of Mobike bicycles. It has an all-aluminium, V-shaped chassis, puncture-proof tires, and a shaft transmission system. Instead of conventional wire spokes, it uses five sets of two thick, parallel, metal rods positioned at 72° from each other to improve durability and lower maintenance costs. The identification number of each bicycle is put on the rear part of the chassis.

Renters scan the QR-code, which is displayed at the base of the handle as well as on the smart lock.

The livery is black for the seat, handlebars and the lock, orange for the wheel and metallic silver for the body.

The bicycle weighs 25 kilograms (55 lb).

Some users have complained about the Classic Mobike's weight and the lack of a bicycle basket (defended by Mobike as to "prevent spam advertising"), and difficulty in keeping balance on their first attempts, which kickstarted the development of Mobike's second iteration, the Mobike Lite.

=== Mobike Lite ===
Mobike Lite is known informally as "generation 2". It uses wire spokes and a conventional chain drive to deliver torque to the rear wheel. The identification number is on the right side on a plastic panel that protects the chain. The QR code has moved to the tip of the rear fender.

The Mobike Lite comes with a net-like metal basket and has a solar panel that powers the QR lock and GPS tracker. The wheels were coloured orange.

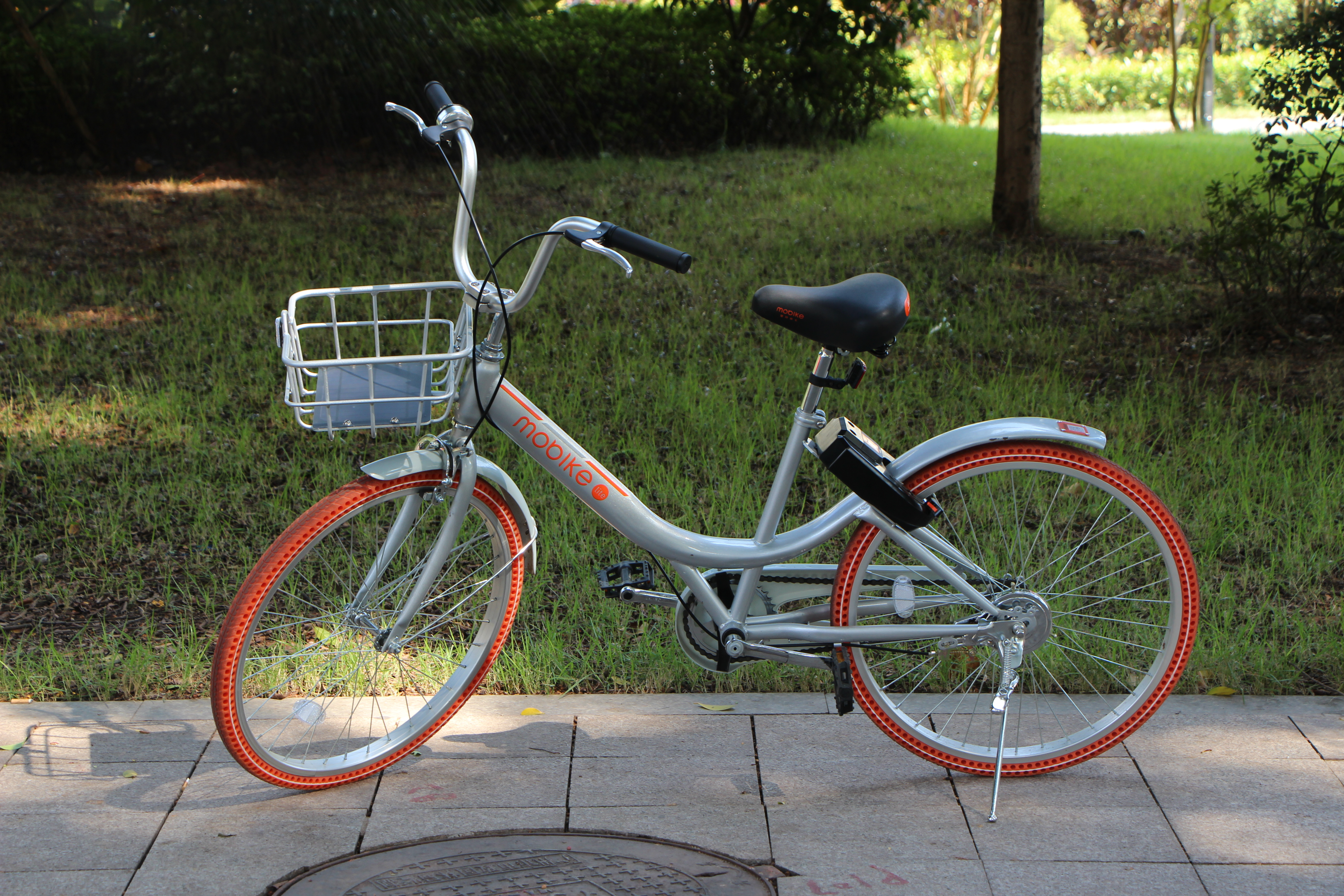
A Mobike Lite bicycle in Guangdong. Note the exposed transmission system.

Newer models of the "Mobike Classic" and "Mobike Lite" have adjustable seats. The Lite weighs 17 kilograms (37 lb).

=== Second generation ===
According to a company press release, small batches of second generation Mobikes, both Classic and Lite, are being deployed in areas of service. Reports indicate that the second generation bicycles use a more durable aluminium kickstand rather than the formerly used hard plastic ones. Also mentioned is the new hydraulic adjustable seat installed on Generation 2 bicycles through depression of a small metal tab near the base of the seat. Finally, the second generation Classic Mobikes now also have a basket.

The colour scheme of the second generation Mobike Lite is changed to orange for the inner rim, and reverts to black for the tyre.

== Access ==
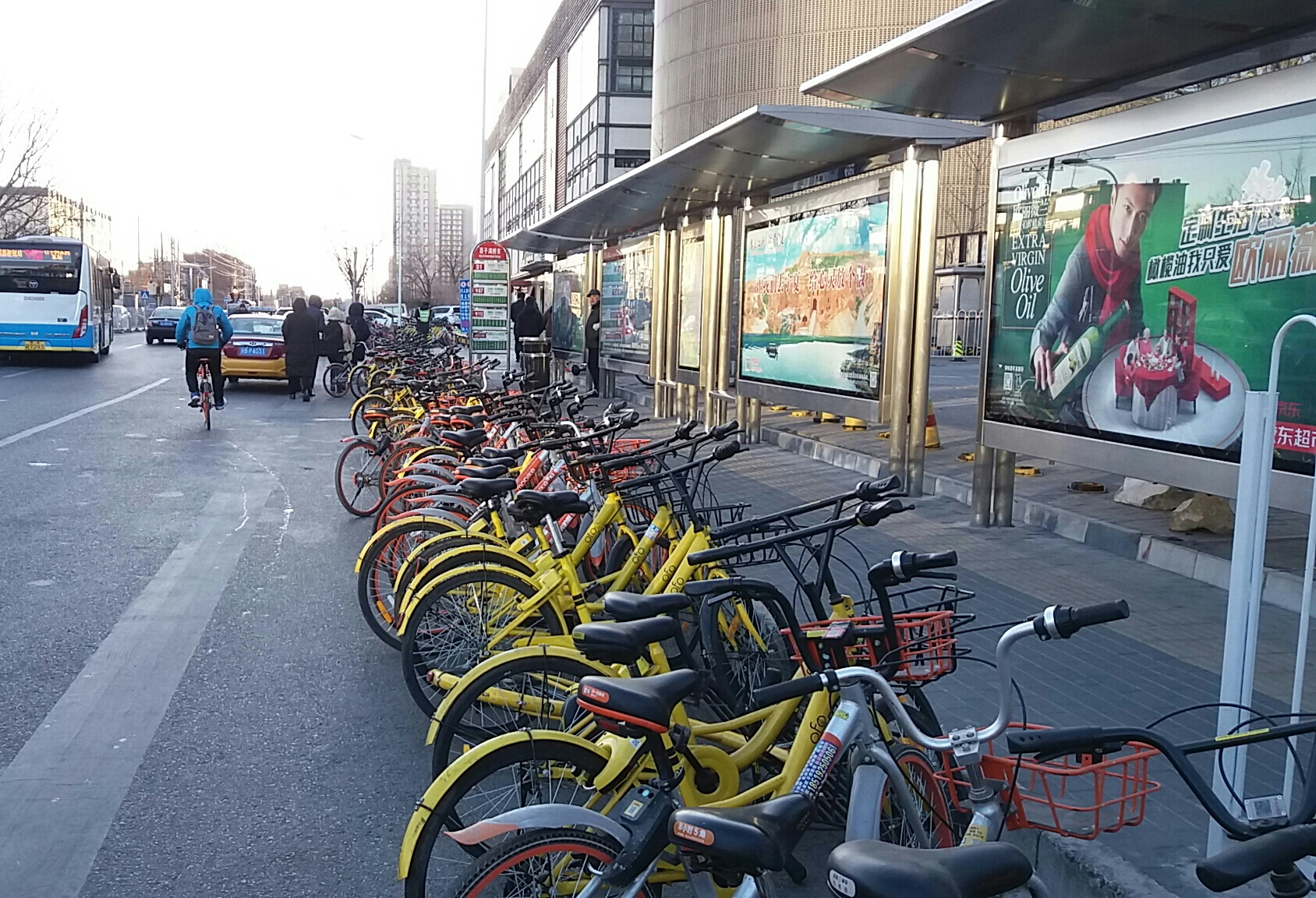
Several ofo and Mobike bikes blocking a bus stop platform

Access to Mobike bicycles requires the Mobike application, which takes a minimum deposit of one unit of country-specific currency to ensure the user supplied payment details are correct. Each user is required to register using their mobile telephone number. In China they must also register their national identification number as required by local government regulations; the software does not allow users under the age of 14 to use the app, through the identification number.

To use a bicycle, the user unlocks the bike using the mobile app. The app records the distance and duration of the trip and the energy the user spent using the bike. At the end of the rental the cost is deducted from the user's account.

=== Payment ===
As Mobike has no offline services, the Mobike app only accepts online transactions through AliPay, WeChat Pay, or credit card. The user needs to have a positive balance in their account when starting the rental, but it is allowed to go negative during a trip.

The company previously required deposit in order to use the service in China, however the company ended the practice in July 2018. Users are free to withdraw their deposit from the service at any time as long as they do not have a negative account balance.

=== Mobike Score ===
The Mobike app initially used a "Mobike Score" system to keep track of user behaviour. The score system consisted of five levels: Outstanding (1000–701), Excellent (700–601), Good (600–501), Fair (500–301), Poor (300–0). Users' Mobike Score affected future fares and use of the system. Every new user automatically started with a "Good" score of 550 points. Users were awarded points for various actions such as reporting any problems with the system or parking in preferred areas with higher demand, and lost points for actions detrimental to the system, which could lead to account suspension.

== Issues ==
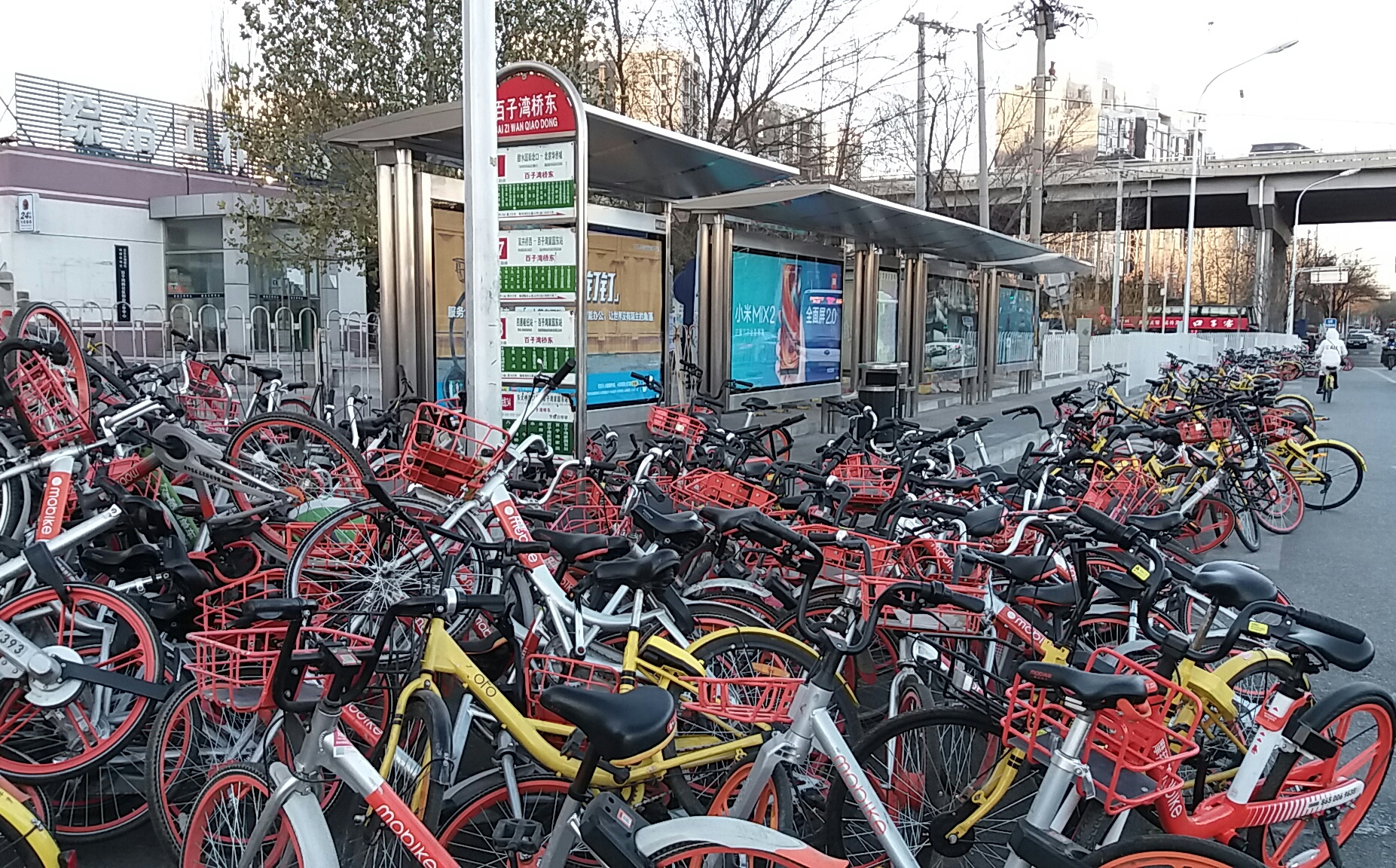
Many Mobikes stacked on top of each other in Beijing

Mobike has several problems with practicality. Many people complain about bikes causing clutter; as they do not have fixed-station parking locations, users can leave Mobikes where they cause obstruction. In response to these complaints, Mobike has introduced parking zones to encourage users to park in specific areas.

In some global markets such as the UK, there has been much reported vandalism of Mobikes.

== See also ==
- Bicycle-sharing system
- List of bicycle-sharing systems
- oBike
- ofo
