= 8th Macau International Movie Festival =

2016 Chinese film awards ceremony

The 8th Macau International Movie Festival ceremony (Chinese: 第8届澳门国际电影节), organized by the Macau Film and Television Media Association and China International Cultural Communication Center, honored the best films of 2016 in the Greater China Region and took place on 15 December 2016, in Macau.

== Winners and nominees ==
Best Picture: My War; Good Luck, Dad; Xuanzang; Chinese Wine; Lord of Shanghai; Being A Cop	Best Director: Sherwood Hu – Lord of Shanghai; Fruit Chan – Kill Time; Oxide Pang – My War; Lin Yu-Hsien – Never Said Goodbye; Chen Bin – Perfect Imperfection; Meng Haojun – Being A Cop
Best Actor: Hu Jun – Lord of Shanghai; Li Xuejian – The Woman Behind the Man; Huang Xiaoming – Xuanzang; Liu Ye – My War; Ahn Jae-hyun – Perfect Imperfection; Lee Jung-jae – Tik Tok	Best Actress: Zhou Dongyu – Never Said Goodbye; Angelababy – Kill Time; Shu Qi – My Best Friend's Wedding; Tiffany Tang – A Chinese Odyssey Part Three; Ady An – Perfect Imperfection; Wang Luodan – My War
Best Supporting Actor: Liu Peiqi – Lord of Shanghai; Tony Yang – My War; Ethan Juan – Never Said Goodbye; Luo Jin – Xuanzang; Alex Fong – Perfect Imperfection; Wang Zijian – The Insanity	Best Supporting Actress: Ariel Aisin-Gioro – When We Were Young; Yan Ni – Good Luck, Dad; Victoria Song – My Best Friend's Wedding; Karen Mok – A Chinese Odyssey Part Three; Amber Kuo – Lord of Shanghai; Pan Hong – Kill Time
Best Writing: Lonely Garden – He Lan; A Chinese Odyssey Part Three – Jeffery Lau; Xuanzang – Zou Jingzhi; My War – Liu Heng; Tik Tok – Ding Xiaoyang; Perfect Imperfection – Chen Huasen	Best Cinematography: When We Were Young – Florian J.E. Zinke; Tik Tok – Li Shengji; Perfect Imperfection – Sun Ming; Never Say Goodbye – Kim Young-ho; My War – Chan Wai-Lin; Kill Time – Lam Wah-Chuen
Best Newcomer: Jeremy Liu – Lonely Garden; Sanna Chen – Who Stole My Baby; Song Jiayang – Perfect Imperfection	Best New Director: Liang Xiaoliang – Good Luck, Dad; Chen Feihong – My Best Friend's Wedding
Best Documentary: I Think I Draw	Best Original Soundtrack: Hua Kai Mo Du – Lord of Shanghai
Best Original Film Score: Mr. Johnny Klimek – Lord of Shanghai	Best Film Production: Lonely Garden; Perfect Imperfection
