= 3rd Macau International Movie Festival =

2011 Chinese film awards ceremony

The 3rd Macau International Movie Festival ceremony, organized by the Macau Film and Television Media Association and China International Cultural Communication Center, honored the best films of 2011 in the Greater China Region and took place on December 7, 2011, at the Venetian Macao, in Macau.

The Woman Knight of Mirror Lake and The Lost Bladesman won three awards each, with the latter film winning Best Picture.

== Winners and nominees ==
Best Picture: The Lost Bladesman – Siu Fai Mak and Felix Chong; The Woman Knight of Mirror Lake – Herman Yau; The Devil Inside Me – Zhang Qi; Mindfulness and Murder – Tom Waller	Best Director: Siu Fai Mak and Felix Chong – The Lost Bladesman; Zhang Qi – The Devil Inside Me; Sung Kee Chiu – 72 Heroes; Xing Xiao – Love Shock; Tom Waller – Mindfulness and Murder
Best Actor: Donnie Yen – The Lost Bladesman; Jiang Wen – The Lost Bladesman; Fan Wei – Tracks Kong Lingxue; Tony Leung Ka-fai – The Devil Inside Me; Louis Koo – All's Well, Ends Well 2011	Best Actress: Huang Yi – The Woman Knight of Mirror Lake; Sun Li – The Lost Bladesman; Kelly Lin – The Devil Inside Me; Vivian Hsu – Dancing Without You; Chie Tanaka – Love Shock
Best Supporting Actor: Anthony Wong – The Woman Knight of Mirror Lake; Nie Yuan – The Lost Bladesman; Eric Tsang – 72 Heroes; Victor Huang – The Devil Inside Me; Chin Shih-Chieh – My Spectacular Theatre	Best Supporting Actress: Irene Wan – 72 Heroes; Rose Chan – The Woman Knight of Mirror Lake; Ma Yili – Tracks Kong Lingxue; Yang Tongshu – The Count of Destiny; Lü Liping – Love Never Dies
Best Writing: The Devil Inside Me – Zhang Qi & Huang Wei; The Lost Bladesman – Siu Fai Mak & Felix Chong; The Struggling Ants – Pan Hao; House Mania – Zha Muchun; Be a Mother – Wang Haiping	Best Cinematography: Be a Mother – Peter Ngor; The Lost Bladesman – Chan Chi-ying; 72 Heroes – Fung Yuen Man; The Count Of Destiny – Guo Wei; Odds In Love – Ko Cheng-Ming
Best Newcomer: Wu Jianfei – She Came To My Concert; Bai Huizi – Tracks Kong Lingxue; Chrissie Chau – Beach Spike; Dennis To – The Woman Knight of Mirror Lake; Shang Hua – Lovers in the Water	Best Documentary: Music World; Vision Practitioners; Pork Chop Bun with Coffee; Pier One
