= 5th Macau International Movie Festival =

2013 Chinese film awards ceremony

The 5th Macau International Movie Festival ceremony, organized by the Macau Film and Television Media Association and China International Cultural Communication Center, honored the best films of 2013 in the Greater China Region and took place on December 23, 2013, at the Wynn Macau in Macau.

CZ12 and Ip Man: The Final Fight won two awards each, with the latter film winning Best Actor.

== Winners and nominees ==
Best Picture: Amazing – Sherwood Hu; CZ12 – Jackie Chan; Saving General Yang – Ronny Yu; The Viral Factor – Dante Lam	Best Director: Jackie Chan – CZ12; Ronny Yu – Saving General Yang; Dante Lam – That Demon Within; Sherwood Hu – Amazing; Dante Lam – Unbeatable
Best Actor: Anthony Wong – Ip Man: The Final Fight; Adam Cheng – Saving General Yang; Chow Yun Fat – The Assassins; Huang Xiaoming – Amazing	Best Actress: Liu Yifei – The Assassins; Joey Yung – Diva; Charlene Choi – The Midas Touch; Xu Fan – Saving General Yang
Best Supporting Actor: William Chan – As the Light Goes Out; Hu Ge – Diva; Vic Chou – Saving General Yang; Wong Bak-Ming – Hotel Deluxe	Best Supporting Actress: Gillian Chung – Ip Man: The Final Fight; Annie Yi – The Assassins; Irene Wan – Triad; Ady An – Saving General Yang
Best Writing: On The Nan Ni Wan Frontier – Wang Bing & Diana Pang; The Viral Factor – Dante Lam; Ip Man: The Final Fight – Li Min; Diva – Heiward Mak	Best Cinematography: They – Xu Bin; The Viral Factor – Kenny TSE Chung-to; The Assassins – Zhao Xiaoding; Diva – SK Yip
Best Newcomer: Rainbow Wang – My Wife Comes from Kinmen	Best Documentary: None
Best Action Choreography: Jackie Chan, Jun He & JC Stunt Team – CZ12	Best Original Film Soundtrack: Mag Lum
Chinese Film Contribution Award: Ren Zhonglun	Outstanding Female Lead Award: Lin Peng – The Viral Factor
Outstanding Producer Award: School Bus; Good Love Again

== Extra Awards ==
- Outstanding Female Lead Award (优秀女主角奖)
- Best Action Choreography (最佳动作设计奖)
- Best Original Film Soundtrack (最佳原唱电影歌曲奖)
- Chinese Film Contribution Award (中国电影贡献奖)
- Outstanding Producer Award (优秀制片人奖)
