= 9th Macau International Movie Festival =

2017 Chinese film awards ceremony

The 9th Macau International Movie Festival (simplified Chinese: 第9届澳门国际电影节; traditional Chinese: 第9屆澳門國際電影節) were held in Macau by the Macau Film and Television Media Association in December 2017.

== Winners and nominees ==
Best Picture: Youth – Feng Xiaogang; The Founding of an Army – Andrew Lau; The Kid from the Big Apple 2: Before We Forget – Jess Teong; Old Beast'' – Zhou Ziyang; Seventy-Seven Days – Zhao Hantang; Baahubali 2: The Conclusion – S. S. Rajamouli; Never Say Die – Song Yang and Zhang Chiyu; A Loner – Xing Xiao	Best Director: Feng Xiaogang – Youth; Cheng Er – The Wasted Times; S. S. Rajamouli – Baahubali 2: The Conclusion; Zhao Xiaoding – Once Upon a Time; Andrew Lau – The Founding of an Army
Best Actor: Ge You – The Wasted Times; Anthony Wong – The Sleep Curse; Huang Xuan – Youth; Tu Men – Old Beast; Eddie Peng – Wu Kong	Best Actress: Zhang Ziyi – The Wasted Times; Jiang Yiyan – Seventy-Seven Days; Zhu Xijuan – A Loner; Liu Yifei – Once Upon a Time; Ni Ni – Wu Kong
Best Supporting Actor: None – None; Yue Yunpeng – Top Funny Comedian: The Movie; Du Chun – The Wasted Times; Shawn Yue – Wu Kong; Zhang Yixing – The Founding of an Army; Zhang Yishan – A Paper Marriage	Best Supporting Actress: Zhao Jing – I Am A Doctor; Li Muzi – Doctor's Mind; Ni Ni – The Wasted Times; Zheng Shuang – Wu Kong; Guan Xiaotong – A Paper Marriage
Best Writing: Youth – Geling Yan; A Paper Marriage – Li Zhiying and Zhang Hui; A Loner – Xing Xiao; Puppy Love – Song Liying; Old Beast – Zhou Ziyang	Best Cinematography: Baahubali 2: The Conclusion – K. K. Senthil Kumar; Youth – Luo Pan; Seventy-Seven Days – Li Pinbing; A Loner – Jason Kwan; A Bite of Youth – Li Chengyu
Best Music: Youth Teeth – Lei Nuo'er; Six Years, Six Days – Zhang Qian; Dark Lover – Yang Jiasong; Baahubali 2: The Conclusion – M.M.Keeravani; Seventy-Seven Days – He Guojie	Best Producer: Seventy-Seven Days; MiddleSchool; I Am A Doctor; Dark Lover; The Lost Land; Untraceable
Best New Actor: Lü Xing – The Wasted Times; Cui Shaocai – Youth Teeth	Best New Actress: Liao Mengxin – British Scholar from Northeast China; Feng Wanzhen – Mr. Monster Adventure; Huang Jingyi – Middle School
Best New Director: Xu Shaoli – The Lost Land; Gong Zi – Nijing Wangpai	Rising Director: Zhao Xiaoding – Once Upon a Time; Li Nan – Hit the Nail on the Head; Xu Zhen – The Love Post Office; Xu Wenqi – Tian Meng
Best Documentary: Outside Class	Outstanding Film Award: The Wind Blew Through Lingding Sea
