= List of accolades received by Baahubali 2: The Conclusion =

List of accolades received by Baahubali: The Conclusion
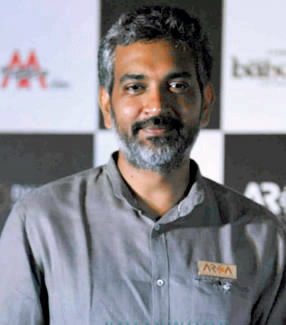
- S. S. Rajamouli received several awards and nominations for directing the film.
Awards and nominations
Award	Wins	Nominations

Totals (Note: Certain award groups do not simply award one winner. They acknowledge several different recipients, have runners-up, and have third place. Since this is a specific recognition and is different from losing an award, runner-up mentions are considered wins in this award tally. For simplification and to avoid errors, each award in this list has been presumed to have had a prior nomination.)
- Wins: 28
- Nominations: 15

Baahubali: The Conclusion is a 2017 Indian Telugu-language epic historical fiction film written and directed by S. S. Rajamouli and produced by Arka Media Works.

The Second of two cinematic parts, The Conclusion opened worldwide on 28 April 2017 to critical acclaim and record-breaking box-office success, becoming the highest-grossing film in India and the second-highest-grossing Indian film worldwide, and the highest-grossing South Indian film.

At the 65th National Film Awards, The Conclusion won the awards for Best Popular Film Providing Wholesome Entertainment, Best Stunt Choreographer and Best Special Effects.

The Conclusion released to positive reviews from critics. It was also praised by the actors of the film industry alike. The film has garnered the Telstra People's Choice Award at the 2017 Indian Film Festival of Melbourne. It won three National Film Awards: Best Popular Film Providing Wholesome Entertainment, Best Special Effects and Best Stunt Choreographer. The Conclusion was premiered at the British Film Institute, and was the inaugural feature film at the 39th Moscow International Film Festival. It is showcased in the "Indian Panorama" section of the 48th International Film Festival of India.

== Accolades ==
Award	Year of Ceremony (Note: Date is linked to the article about the awards held that year, wherever possible.)	Category	Recipient(s) and nominee(s)	Result	Ref.
Ananda Vikatan Cinema Awards	2018	Best Supporting Actor	Sathyaraj	Won	
Ananda Vikatan Cinema Awards	2018	Best Visual Effects	R.C.Kamala Kannan	Won	
Ananda Vikatan Cinema Awards	2018	Best Art Director	Sabu Cyril	Won	
Ananda Vikatan Cinema Awards	2018	Best Makeup Artist	Senapathi Naidu, Nalla Srinu	Won	
Asian Film Awards	2018	Best Costume Designer	Rama Rajamouli Prashanti Tipirneni	Nominated	
Asian Film Awards	2018	Best Visual Effects	Ankur Sachdev	Nominated	
CNN-IBN Indian of the Year	2017	Outstanding Achievement in Entertainment	Baahubali: The Conclusion	Won	
Filmfare Awards South	2018	Best Film – Telugu	Shobu Yarlagadda, Prasad Devineni	Won	
Filmfare Awards South	2018	Best Director – Telugu	S. S. Rajamouli	Won	
Filmfare Awards South	2018	Best Actor – Telugu	Prabhas	Nominated	
Filmfare Awards South	2018	Best Actress – Telugu	Anushka Shetty	Nominated	
Filmfare Awards South	2018	Best Music Director – Telugu	M. M. Keeravani	Won	
Filmfare Awards South	2018	Best Lyricist – Telugu	M. M. Keeravani (for Dandalayya)	Won	
Filmfare Awards South	2018	Best Supporting Actor – Telugu	Rana Daggubati	Won	
Filmfare Awards South	2018	Best Supporting Actor – Telugu	Sathyaraj	Nominated	
Filmfare Awards South	2018	Best Supporting Actress – Telugu	Ramya Krishnan	Won	
Filmfare Awards South	2018	Best Playback Singer Female – Telugu	Sony & Deepu (for song "Hamsa Naava")	Won	
Filmfare Awards South	2018	Best Cinematographer	K. K. Senthil Kumar	Won	
Filmfare Awards South	2018	Best Art Director – South	Sabu Cyril	Won	
Indian Film Festival of Melbourne	2017	Telstra People's Choice Award	Baahubali: The Conclusion (shared with Dangal)	Won	
Macau International Movie Festival	2017	Best Cinematography	Senthil Kumar	Won	
Macau International Movie Festival	2017	Best Picture	Baahubali: The Conclusion	Nominated	
Macau International Movie Festival	2017	Best Director	S.S. Rajamouli	Nominated	
Macau International Movie Festival	2017	Best Original Film Soundtrack	M.M. Keeravani	Nominated	
Mirchi Music Awards	2017	Upcoming Male Vocalist of The Year	Kaala Bhairava (for the song "Shivam")	Nominated	
Mirchi Music Awards	2017	Critics' Choice Female Vocalist of The Year	Madhushree (for the song Soja Zara)	Nominated	
National Film Awards	2018	National Film Award for Best Popular Film Providing Wholesome Entertainment	Shobu Yarlagadda, Prasad Devineni	Won	
National Film Awards	2018	Best Special Effects	R.C. Kamala Kannan	Won	
National Film Awards	2018	Best Stunt Choreographer	King Solomon, Lee Whittaker & Kaecha Kampakdee	Won	
Saturn Awards	2018	Best International Film	Shobu Yarlagadda, Prasad Devineni	Won	
South Indian International Movie Awards	2018	Best Film (Telugu)	Shobu Yarlagadda, Prasad Devineni	Won	
South Indian International Movie Awards	2018	Best Director (Telugu)	S. S. Rajamouli	Won	
South Indian International Movie Awards	2018	Best Actor (Telugu)	Prabhas	Won	
South Indian International Movie Awards	2018	Best Actress (Telugu)	Anushka Shetty	Nominated	
South Indian International Movie Awards	2018	Best Cinematographer (Telugu)	K. K. Senthil Kumar	Won	
South Indian International Movie Awards	2018	Best Music Director (Telugu)	M. M. Keeravani	Won	
South Indian International Movie Awards	2018	Best Actor in a Negative Role (Telugu)	Rana Daggubati	Won	
South Indian International Movie Awards	2018	Best Supporting Actor (Telugu)	Sathyaraj	Nominated	
South Indian International Movie Awards	2018	Best Supporting Actress (Telugu)	Ramya Krishnan	Nominated	
South Indian International Movie Awards	2018	Best Lyricist (Telugu)	K. Shiva Datta	Nominated	
South Indian International Movie Awards	2018	Best Male Playback Singer (Telugu)	Kaala Bhairavaa (for song "Dandalayya")	Won	
South Indian International Movie Awards	2018	Best Female Playback Singer (Telugu)	Sony (for song "Hamsa Naava')	Nominated	
Zee Cine Awards	2018	Extraordinary Franchise	Baahubali	Won	
Zee Cine Awards Telugu	2017	Best Film	Shobu Yarlagadda, Prasad Devineni	Won	
