= 12th Macau International Movie Festival =

2020 Chinese film awards ceremony

The 12th Macau International Movie Festival (simplified Chinese: 第12届澳门国际电影节; traditional Chinese: 第12屆澳門國際電影節) were held in Macau by the Macau Film and Television Media Association in December 2020.

== Winners and nominees ==
Best Picture: The Eight Hundred – Guan Hu; The Sacrifice – Guan Hu, Guo Fan, and Lu Yang; Legally Declared Dead – Yuan Jianwei; Wild Grass – Xu Zhanxiong; Sheep Without a Shepherd – Chen Sicheng; Fatal Visit – Pan Yuanliang; August Never End – Li Kai; Almost a Comedy – Zhou Shen, Liu Lu	Best Director: Guan Hu – The Eight Hundred; Sam Quah – Sheep Without a Shepherd; Yuan Jianwei – Legally Declared Dead; Pan Yuanliang – Fatal Visit; Li Kai – August Never End
Best Actor: Zhang Yi – The Sacrifice; Xiao Yang – Sheep Without a Shepherd; Tong Dawei – Fatal Visit; Luo Jin – August Never End; Carlos Chan – Legally Declared Dead	Best Actress: Zhong Chuxi – August Never End; Joan Chen – Sheep Without a Shepherd; Zhao Wei – Two Tigers; Ma Sichun – Wild Grass; Sammi Cheng – Fatal Visit
Best Supporting Actor: None – None; Paul Chun – Sheep Without a Shepherd; Wu Jing – The Sacrifice; Du Chun – The Eight Hundred; Fan Wei – Two Tigers; Ni Dahong – Yi Ri Cheng Jiao	Best Supporting Actress: Tian Hairong – Quan Xin Ai Ni; Tan Zhuo – Sheep Without a Shepherd; Liu Xiaoqing – The Eight Hundred; Charlene Choi – Fatal Visit; Yan Ni – Two Tigers
Best Writing: The Sacrifice – Guan Hu; Legally Declared Dead – Yuan Jianwei; Wild Grass – Xu Zhanxiong; Almost a Comedy – Zhou Shen, Liu Lu; Yi Ri Cheng Jiao – Wang Ting	Best Cinematography: None – None; Sheep Without a Shepherd – Zhang Ying; The Sacrifice – Luo Pan, Liu Yin, Han Qiming, Gao Weizhe; The Eight Hundred – Cao Yu; Legally Declared Dead – Cheng Zhankai; Fatal Visit – Ye Shaolin
Best New Actor: Xi Ge – Jiu Jiu Jian Guo Hai Xiang Jian	Outstanding Actress: Lan Xinyan – The Golden City of Waking Up
Best New Director: Shen Mubai – The Golden City of Waking Up; San Chou – Zhang Zhidong	Most Popular Film for Online Voting: The Eight Hundred – Guan Hu
Most Popular Actor: Luo Jin – August Never End	Most Popular Actress: Tian Hairong – Quan Xin Ai Ni
