= Golden Lotus Award for Best Actor =

Annual Chinese film award

Golden Lotus Award for Best Actor (simplified Chinese: 金莲花奖最佳男主角; traditional Chinese: 金蓮花獎最佳男主角) is one of the main categories of competition of the Golden Lotus Awards. It is awarded to leading male actor(s) who have outstanding performance in motion pictures.

== Award winners and nominees ==
=== 2000s ===
==== 2009 (1st) ====
Year	Winner and nominees (English)	Winner and nominees (Mandarin)	English title	Original title
2009	Zhu Xu	朱旭	Lan	《我们天上见》
2009	Xia Yu	夏雨	Life of Sentime	《感情生活》
2009	Akira Chen	陈文彬	Cannot Live Without You	《不能没有你》
2009	Chen Taishen	成泰燊	Ma Wen's Battle	《马文的战争》

=== 2010s ===
==== 2010 (2nd) ====
Year	Winner and nominees (English)	Winner and nominees (Mandarin)	English title	Original title
2010	Alec Su	苏有朋	A Tibetan Love Song	《康定情歌》
2010	Eddie Peng Yuyan	彭于晏	More Than Close	《近在咫尺的爱恋》
2010	Ying Da	英达	You and Me	《我和你》
2010	Qiu Yanxiang	邱彦翔	Bed Man	《弹簧床先生》

==== 2011 (3rd) ====
Year	Winner and nominees (English)	Winner and nominees (Mandarin)	English title	Original title
2011	Donnie Yen	甄子丹	The Lost Bladesman	《关云长》
2011	Jiang Wen	姜文	The Lost Bladesman	《关云长》
2011	Fan Wei	范伟	Tracks Kong Lingxue	《跟踪孔令学》
2011	Tony Leung Ka-fai	梁家辉	The Devil Inside Me	《夺命心跳》
2011	Louis Koo	古天乐	All's Well, Ends Well 2011	《最强喜事》

==== 2012 (4th) ====
Year	Winner and nominees (English)	Winner and nominees (Mandarin)	English title	Original title
2012	Yu Entai	喻恩泰	Stand-In	《做次有钱人》
2012	Guo Tao	郭涛	Million Dollar Crocodile	《百万巨鳄》
2012	Zhang Zhizhong	张志忠	Iron Man	《铁人》
2012	Jiang Wu	姜武	Happy Hotel	《乐翻天》
2012	Feng Lei	冯雷	Under The Temptation	《四戒》

==== 2013 (5th) ====
Year	Winner and nominees (English)	Winner and nominees (Mandarin)	English title	Original title
2013	Anthony Perry	黄秋生	Ip Man: The Final Fight	《叶问：终极一战》
2013	Adam Cheng	郑少秋	Saving General Yang	《忠烈杨家将》
2013	Chow Yun Fat	周润发	The Assassins	《铜雀台》
2013	Huang Xiaoming	黄晓明	Amazing	《神奇》

==== 2014 (6th) ====
Year	Winner and nominees (English)	Winner and nominees (Mandarin)	English title	Original title
2014	Simon Yam	任达华	Sara	《雏妓》
2014	Daniel Wu	吴彦祖	That Demon Within	《魔警》
2014	Chen Daoming	陈道明	Coming Home	《归来》
2014	Donnie Yen	甄子丹	Kung Fu Jungle	《一个人的武林》
2014	Bosco Wong	黄宗泽	Golden Brother	《男人不可以穷》

==== 2015 (7th) ====
Year	Winner and nominees (English)	Winner and nominees (Mandarin)	English title	Original title
2015	Ti Lung	狄龍	The Kid from the Big Apple	《我來自紐約》
2015	Eddie Peng	彭于晏	To the Fore	《破風》
2015	Feng Xiaogang	馮小剛	Mr. Six	《老炮兒》
2015	Donnie Yen	甄子丹	Ip Man 3	《葉問3》
2015	Francis Ng	吳鎮宇	Two Thumbs Up	《衝鋒車》

==== 2016 (8th) ====
Year	Winner and nominees (English)	Winner and nominees (Mandarin)	English title	Original title
2016	Hu Jun	胡军	Lord of Shanghai	《上海王》
2016	Li Xuejian	李雪健	The Woman Behind the Man	《老阿姨》
2016	Huang Xiaoming	黄晓明	Xuanzang	《大唐玄奘》
2016	Liu Ye	刘烨	My War	《我的战争》
2016	Ahn Jae-hyun	安宰贤	Perfect Imperfection	《我是处女座》
2016	Lee Jung-jae	李政宰	Tik Tok	《惊天大逆转》

==== 2017 (9th) ====
Year	Winner and nominees (English)	Winner and nominees (Mandarin)	English title	Original title
2017	Ge You	葛优	The Wasted Times	《罗曼蒂克消亡史》
2017	Anthony Wong	黄秋生	The Sleep Curse	《失眠》
2017	Huang Xuan	黄轩	Youth	《芳华》
2017	Tu Men	涂们	Old Beast	《老兽》
2017	Eddie Peng	彭于晏	Wu Kong	《悟空传》

==== 2018 (10th) ====
Year	Winner and nominees (English)	Winner and nominees (Mandarin)	English title	Original title
2018	Chen Jianbin	陈建斌	A Cool Fish	《无名之辈》
2018	Wang Leehom	王力宏	Forever Young	《无问西东》
2018	Eddie Peng	彭于晏	Hidden Man	《邪不压正》
2018	Louis Koo	古天樂	L Storm	《L风暴》
2018	Vincent Zhao	赵文卓	Invisible Tattoo	《纹身：西部纵横》

==== 2019 (11th) ====
Year	Winner and nominees (English)	Winner and nominees (Mandarin)	English title	Original title
2019	Yu Qian	于谦	Song of Youth	《老师·好》
2019	Deng Chao	邓超	Looking Up	《银河补习班》
2019	Zhang Hanyu	张涵予	The Captain	《中国机长》
2019	Wu Jing	吴京	The Wandering Earth	《流浪地球》
2019	Louis Koo	古天樂	P Storm	《P风暴》
2019	Darren Wang	王大陸	The Last Wish	《小小的願望》
2019	Shen Teng	沈腾	Crazy Alien	《疯狂的外星人》
2019	Fan Wei	范伟	Hunt Down	《长安盗》
