= Golden Lotus Award for Best Director =

Annual Chinese film award

Golden Lotus Award for Best Director (simplified Chinese: 金莲花奖最佳导演; traditional Chinese: 金蓮花獎最佳導演) is one of the Golden Lotus Awards presented by the Macau Film and Television Media Association and China International Cultural Communication Center to directors working in the motion picture industry.

== Award winners and nominees ==
=== 2000s ===
==== 2009 (1st) ====
| Year | Winner and nominees (English) | Winner and nominees (Mandarin) | English title | Original title |
|---|---|---|---|---|
| 2009 | Jiang Wenli | 蒋雯丽 | Lan | 《我们天上见》 |
| 2009 | Leon Dai | 戴立忍 | Not Without You | 《不能没有你》 |
| 2009 | Zhang Hui | 张辉 | White Mountain | 《天山雪》 |
| 2009 | Ghani Turner | 加尼·特纳 | White Wedding | 《白色婚礼》 |

=== 2010s ===
==== 2010 (2nd) ====
| Year | Winner and nominees (English) | Winner and nominees (Mandarin) | English title | Original title |
|---|---|---|---|---|
| 2010 | Chen Bing | 陈兵 | Wild Strawberries | 《野草莓》 |
| 2010 | Jesse Johnson | 杰西·约翰逊 | Charlie Valentine | 《查理的情人》 |
| 2010 | Hu Yaozhi | 扈耀之 | You and Me | 《我和你》 |
| 2010 | Xu Jinglei | 徐静蕾 | Go Lala Go! | 《杜拉拉升职记》 |

==== 2011 (3rd) ====
| Year | Winner and nominees (English) | Winner and nominees (Mandarin) | English title | Original title |
|---|---|---|---|---|
| 2011 | Siu Fai Mak and Felix Chong | 麦兆辉和庄文强 | The Lost Bladesman | 《关云长》 |
| 2011 | Zhang Qi | 张琦 | The Devil Inside Me | 《夺命心跳》 |
| 2011 | Sung Kee Chiu | 赵崇基 | Heroes | 《英雄·喋血》 |
| 2011 | Xing Xiao | 邢潇 | Love Shock | 《2012来了》 |
| 2011 | Tom Waller | 汤姆·沃勒 | Mindfulness and Murder | 《正义与杀戮》 |

==== 2012 (4th) ====
| Year | Winner and nominees (English) | Winner and nominees (Mandarin) | English title | Original title |
|---|---|---|---|---|
| 2012 | Ye Huaijun | 叶怀军 | Xiao Xing Tian Xia | 《孝行天下》 |
| 2012 | Shi Lei | 石磊 | One Night To Be Star | 《一夜成名》 |
| 2012 | Wang Yuelun | 王岳伦 | Happy Hotel | 《乐翻天》 |
| 2012 | Zheng Zhen | 郑真 | Ever Loving Ocean Of Blues | 《蓝调海之恋》 |
| 2012 | Gao Bo | 高博 | Outbreak Mother | 《暴走妈妈》 |

==== 2013 (5th) ====
| Year | Winner and nominees (English) | Winner and nominees (Mandarin) | English title | Original title |
|---|---|---|---|---|
| 2013 | Jackie Chan | 成龙 | CZ12 | 《十二生肖》 |
| 2013 | Yu Rentai | 于仁泰 | Saving General Yang | 《忠烈杨家将》 |
| 2013 | Sherwood Hu | 胡雪桦 | Amazing | 《神奇》 |
| 2013 | Dante Lam | 林超贤 | Unbeatable | 《激战》 |

==== 2014 (6th) ====
| Year | Winner and nominees (English) | Winner and nominees (Mandarin) | English title | Original title |
|---|---|---|---|---|
| 2014 | Zhong Shujia | 钟澍佳 | Golden Brother | 《男人不可以穷》 |
| 2014 | Isao Yukisada | 行定勋 | Five Minutes to Tomorrow | 《深夜前的五分钟》 |
| 2014 | Dante Lam | 林超贤 | That Demon Within | 《魔警》 |
| 2014 | Chen Sicheng | 陈思诚 | Beijing Love Story | 《北京爱情故事》 |
| 2014 | Teddy Chan | 陈德森 | Kung Fu Jungle | 《一个人的武林》 |

==== 2015 (7th) ====
| Year | Winner and nominees (English) | Winner and nominees (Mandarin) | English title | Original title |
|---|---|---|---|---|
| 2015 | Jean-Jacques Annaud | 尚-賈克·阿諾 | Wolf Totem | 《狼圖騰》 |
| 2015 | Guan Hu | 管虎 | Mr. Six | 《老炮兒》 |
| 2015 | Dante Lam | 林超賢 | To the Fore | 《破風》 |
| 2015 | Khan Lee | 李崗 | Dream Flight | 《想飛》 |
| 2015 | Xu Ang | 徐昂 | 12 Citizens | 《十二公民》 |

==== 2016 (8th) ====
| Year | Winner and nominees (English) | Winner and nominees (Mandarin) | English title | Original title |
|---|---|---|---|---|
| 2016 | Sherwood Hu | 胡雪桦 | Lord of Shanghai | 《上海王》 |
| 2016 | Fruit Chan | 陈果 | Kill Time | 《谋杀似水年华》 |
| 2016 | Oxide Pang | 彭顺 | My War | 《我的战争》 |
| 2016 | Lin Yu-Hsien | 林育贤 | Never Said Goodbye | 《谎言西西里》 |
| 2016 | Chen Bin | 陈兵 | Perfect Imperfection | 《我是处女座》 |
| 2016 | Meng Haojun | 孟浩军 | Being A Cop | 《警察不好当》 |

==== 2017 (9th) ====
| Year | Winner and nominees (English) | Winner and nominees (Mandarin) | English title | Original title |
|---|---|---|---|---|
| 2017 | Feng Xiaogang | 冯小刚 | Youth | 《芳华》 |
| 2017 | Cheng Er | 程耳 | The Wasted Times | 《罗曼蒂克消亡史》 |
| 2017 | S. S. Rajamouli | S·S·拉贾穆里 | Baahubali 2: The Conclusion | 《巴霍巴利王2》 |
| 2017 | Zhao Xiaoding | 赵小丁 | Once Upon a Time | 《三生三世十里桃花》 |
| 2017 | Andrew Lau | 刘伟强 | The Founding of an Army | 《建军大业》 |
