= Golden Lotus Award for Best Cinematography =

Annual Chinese film award

The Golden Lotus Award for Best Cinematography (simplified Chinese: 金莲花奖最佳摄影; traditional Chinese: 金蓮花獎最佳攝影) is a Golden Lotus Award awarded each year to a cinematographer for work in one particular motion picture.

== Award winners and nominees ==
=== 2000s ===
==== 2009 (1st) ====
Year	Winner and nominees (English)	Winner and nominees (Chinese)	English title	Original title
2009	None	None	None	None

=== 2010s ===
==== 2010 (2nd) ====
Year	Winner and nominees (English)	Winner and nominees (Chinese)	English title	Original title
2010	Franz Pagot	弗朗兹·帕格特	Full Circle	《真爸爸假爸爸》
2010	Dong Daxin	董大欣	Ten-Mile Red Dowry	《十里红妆》
2010	Jian Liwei	简立威	Go Lala Go!	《杜拉拉升职记》
2010	Alex Shi	史岳	Wild Strawberries	《野草莓》

==== 2011 (3rd) ====
Year	Winner and nominees (English)	Winner and nominees (Chinese)	English title	Original title
2011	Peter Ngor	敖志军	Be a Mother	《母语》
2011	Chan Chi-ying	陈志英	The Lost Bladesman	《关云长》
2011	Feng Yuanwen	冯远文	Heroes	《英雄喋血》
2011	Guo Wei	郭伟	The Count Of Destiny	《极峰迷情》
2011	Ke Zhengming	柯政铭	Odds In Love	《爱情斗阵》

==== 2012 (4th) ====
Year	Winner and nominees (English)	Winner and nominees (Chinese)	English title	Original title
2012	None	None	None	None
2012	Long Shensong and Chen Youliang	龙申松、陈友良	All For Love	《三个未婚妈妈》
2012	Shang Zhiqiang	尚志强	Ever Loving Ocean of Blues	《蓝调海之恋》
2012	hou Wencao	周文操	Shanshui Station	《山水驿站》

==== 2013 (5th) ====
Year	Winner and nominees (English)	Winner and nominees (Chinese)	English title	Original title
2013	Xu Bin	徐斌	They	《她们》
2013	Kenny TSE Chung-to	谢忠道	The Viral Factor	《逆战》
2013	Zhao Xiaoding	赵小丁	The Assassins	《铜雀台》
2013	SK Yip	叶绍麒	Diva	《华丽之后》

==== 2014 (6th) ====
Year	Winner and nominees (English)	Winner and nominees (Chinese)	English title	Original title
2014	Zhao Xiaoding	赵小丁	Coming Home	《归来》
2014	Wong Wing-Hung	黄永恒	Kung Fu Jungle	《一个人的武林》
2014	Song Xiaofei	宋晓飞	Beijing Love Story	《北京爱情故事》
2014	Zhang Nan	张楠	Black Mirror	《少女灵异日记》
2014	Kenny TSE Chung-to	谢忠道	That Demon Within	《魔警》

==== 2015 (7th) ====
Year	Winner and nominees (English)	Winner and nominees (Chinese)	English title	Original title
2015	Jean-Marie Dreujou	让·马利·德雷鲁	Wolf Totem	《狼图腾》
2015	Luo Pan	罗攀	Mr. Six	《老炮儿》
2015	Chan Chor Keung	陈楚强	To the Fore	《破风》
2015	Kenny TSE Chung-to	谢忠道	Ip Man 3	《叶问3》
2015	Billy Lee	李鸿庆	See Your Voice	《看见你的声音》

==== 2016 (8th) ====
Year	Winner and nominees (English)	Winner and nominees (Chinese)	English title	Original title
2016	Florian J. E. Zinke	陆一帆	When We Were Young	《不朽的时光》
2016	Li Shengji	李晟齐	Tik Tok	《惊天大逆转》
2016	Sun Ming	孙明	Perfect Imperfection	《我是处女座》
2016	Kim Young-ho	金荣号	Never Said Goodbye	《谎言西西里》
2016	Chan Wai-Lin	陈伟年	My War	《我的战争》
2016	Lam Wah-Cheun	林华全	Kill Time	《谋杀似水年华》

==== 2016 (8th) ====
Year	Winner and nominees (English)	Winner and nominees (Chinese)	English title	Original title
2016	He Lan	何澜	Lonely Garden	《孤独花园》
2016	Jeffery Lau	刘镇伟	A Chinese Odyssey Part Three	《大话西游3》
2016	Zou Jingzhi	邹静之	Xuanzang	《大唐玄奘》
2016	Liu Heng	刘恒	My War	《我的战争》
2016	Ding Xiaoyang	丁小洋	Tik Tok	《惊天大逆转》
2016	Chen Huasen	陈华森	Perfection Imperfection	《我是处女座》

==== 2017 (9th) ====
Year	Winner and nominees (English)	Winner and nominees (Mandarin)	English title	Original title
2017	K. K. Senthil Kumar	塞特希•庫馬爾	Baahubali 2: The Conclusion	《巴霍巴利王2》
2017	Luo Pan	羅攀	Youth	《芳华》
2017	Li Pinbing	李屏宾	Seventy-Seven Days	《七十七天》
2017	Jason Kwan	关智耀	A Loner	《大雪冬至》
2017	Li Chengyu	李承禹	A Bite of Youth	《青春的牙》
