= Golden Lotus Award for Best Writing =

Award given to the best screenplay writer - Golden Lotus Award

Golden Lotus Award for Best Writing (simplified Chinese: 金莲花奖最佳编剧; traditional Chinese: 金蓮花獎最佳編劇) is the main category of Competition of Golden Lotus Awards, awarding to screenplay writer.

== Award winners and nominees ==
=== 2000s ===
==== 2009 (1st) ====
Year	Winner and nominees (English)	Winner and nominees (Chinese)	English title	Original title
2009	Juan Fischer & Erwin Goggel	胡安·菲舍尔 埃尔温·格格尔	Buscando a Miguel	《寻找米格》
2009	Zhang Hui	张辉	White Mountain	《天山雪》
2009	Xie Xiaodong	谢晓东	Invisible Killer	《无形杀》
2009	Zhou Juan & Bao Lide	周娟、宝力德	Seeking Naadam	《寻找那达慕》

=== 2010s ===
==== 2010 (2nd) ====
Year	Winner and nominees (English)	Winner and nominees (Chinese)	English title	Original title
2010	Pei Bei	裴蓓	Unworldly	《天上人》
2010	Cui Zi'en & Chen Bing	崔子恩、陈兵	Wild Strawberries	《野草莓》
2010	Lingzi	玲子	Happiness Pursuit	《幸福并不遥远》
2010	Cheng Hsiao Tse	程孝泽	More Than Close	《近在咫尺的爱恋》

==== 2011 (3rd) ====
Year	Winner and nominees (English)	Winner and nominees (Chinese)	English title	Original title
2011	Zhang Qi & Huang Wei	张琦、黄苇	The Devil Inside Me	《夺命心跳》
2011	Siu Fai Mak & Felix Chong	麦兆辉、庄文强	The Lost Bladesman	《关云长》
2011	Pan Hao	潘昊	The Struggling Ants	《狂奔蚂蚁》
2011	Zha Muchun	查暮春	House Mania	《房不剩防》
2011	Wang Haiping	王海平	Be a Mother	《母语》

==== 2012 (4th) ====
Year	Winner and nominees (English)	Winner and nominees (Chinese)	English title	Original title
2012	Ma Daishan	马岱山	Iron Man: Wang Jinxi	《铁人王进喜》
2012	Liu Yihan	刘奕含	When the Meteor Across the Sky	《当流星划过天际》
2012	He Wenchao	何文超	Sweet Eighteen	《甜蜜十八岁》
2012	Ibrahim Wang	王子辰	Shadow Player	《签手》

==== 2013 (5th) ====
Year	Winner and nominees (English)	Winner and nominees (Chinese)	English title	Original title
2013	Wang Bing & Diana Pang	王兵、彭丹	Nanniwan	《南泥湾》
2013	Dante Lam	林超贤	The Viral Factor	《逆战》
2013	Li Min	李敏	Ip Man: The Final Fight	《叶问：终极一战》
2013	Heiward Mak	麦曦茵	Diva	《华丽之后》

==== 2014 (6th) ====
Year	Winner and nominees (English)	Winner and nominees (Chinese)	English title	Original title
2014	Zou Jingzhi	邹静之	Coming Home	《归来》
2014	Chen Sicheng	陈思诚	Beijing Love Story	《北京爱情故事》
2014	He Lan	何澜	A Person's Love	《一个人的恋情》
2014	Jiang Ping	姜萍	Feeling the Love Flute	《情笛之爱》
2014	Barbara Wong	黄真真	708090	《708090之深圳恋歌》

==== 2015 (7th) ====
Year	Winner and nominees (English)	Winner and nominees (Chinese)	English title	Original title
2015	Zhang Juexi	张爵西	The Kid from the Big Apple	《我来自纽约》
2015	Yiu-Fai Law	罗耀辉	Happiness	《幸运是我》
2015	Qin Yi	秦怡	Qinghai Lake	《青海湖畔》
2015	Ho Leung Lau	刘浩良	To the Fore	《冲锋车》
2015	Edmond Wong	黄子桓	Ip Man 3	《叶问3》

==== 2016 (8th) ====
Year	Winner and nominees (English)	Winner and nominees (Chinese)	English title	Original title
2016	He Lan	何澜	Lonely Garden	《孤独花园》
2016	Jeffery Lau	刘镇伟	A Chinese Odyssey Part Three	《大话西游3》
2016	Zou Jingzhi	邹静之	Xuanzang	《大唐玄奘》
2016	Liu Heng	刘恒	My War	《我的战争》
2016	Ding Xiaoyang	丁小洋	Tik Tok	《惊天大逆转》
2016	Chen Huasen	陈华森	Perfection Imperfection	《我是处女座》

==== 2016 (8th) ====
Year	Winner and nominees (English)	Winner and nominees (Mandarin)	English title	Original title
2016	Sherwood Hu	胡雪桦	Lord of Shanghai	《上海王》
2016	Fruit Chan	陈果	Kill Time	《谋杀似水年华》
2016	Oxide Pang	彭顺	My War	《我的战争》
2016	Lin Yu-Hsien	林育贤	Never Said Goodbye	《谎言西西里》
2016	Chen Bin	陈兵	Perfect Imperfection	《我是处女座》
2016	Meng Haojun	孟浩军	Being A Cop	《警察不好当》

==== 2017 (9th) ====
Year	Winner and nominees (English)	Winner and nominees (Mandarin)	English title	Original title
2017	Geling Yan	严歌苓	Youth	《芳华》
2017	Li Zhiying / Zhang Hui	李祉萤 / 张辉	A Paper Marriage	《一纸婚约》
2017	Xing Xiao	邢潇	A Loner	《大雪冬至》
2017	Song Liying	宋丽颖	Puppy Love	《小情书》
2017	Zhou Ziyang	周子阳	Old Beast	《老兽》
