= The Sacrifice (2020 film) =

2020 film by Guan Hu, Frant Gwo and Lu Yang

- Film poster
- Traditional Chinese: 金剛川
- Simplified Chinese: 金刚川
- Literal meaning: Geumgang River
- Hanyu Pinyin: Jīngāng Chuān
- Directed by: Guan Hu; Frant Gwo; Lu Yang
- Written by: Guan Hu
- Produced by: Fu Ruoqing; Liang Jing; Guan Hu
- Starring: Zhang Yi; Wu Jing; Li Jiuxiao; Vision Wei; Deng Chao
- Cinematography: Gao Weizhe; Han Qiming; Michael Yoo; Luo Pan
- Edited by: Lu Di; Ye Xiaochang; He Yongyi
- Music by: Roc Chen (阿鲲); Andrew Kawczynski
- Production companies: China Film Co., Ltd. Seven Impressions Film and Television Media (Haikou) Ltd. Frant Gwo Culture Media (Beijing) Ltd. Beijing Free Ku Jing Cinema Ltd. Huaxia Film Distribution; Huayi Brothers Media Corporation
- Distributed by: China Film Co., Ltd. (Mainland China); Emperor Motion Pictures (Hong Kong)
- Release dates: 23 October 2020 (Mainland China); 19 November 2020 (Hong Kong)
- Running time: 122 minutes
- Country: China
- Languages: Mandarin; English; Nanchang dialect
- Box office: US$173.8 million (1.12 billion RMB)

The Sacrifice (Chinese: 金刚川; pinyin: Jīngāng chuān; lit. 'Kumgang River') is a 2020 Chinese anthology war drama film directed by Guan Hu, Frant Gwo, and Lu Yang, and starring Zhang Yi, Wu Jing, Li Jiuxiao, Vision Wei, and Deng Chao. The film depicts the Korean War from three perspectives and segments, each directed by a different director.

The film is noted for having done its production in less than two months. Filming started for the film in August 2020 and wrapped on September 20, 2020. The film was originally scheduled to be screened on 25 October 2020, but the date was moved up to 23 October. The tagline on the promotional poster is "National defense brooks no delay" (保家卫国刻不容缓).

== Plot ==
In 1953, the Korean War is reaching its final stage. The People's Volunteer Army is launching its last large-scale campaign, the Jincheng Campaign, in Kumsong. In order to arrive at the designated time and bring more firepower to the front lines in Kumsong, the soldiers of the People's Volunteer Army, short of supplies and with a huge disparity in equipment, withstand continuous bombing from enemy planes. They sacrifice their flesh and blood to repair a wooden bridge amidst the flames of war. A little-known chapter of history slowly unfolds above the surging Geumgang River, from which the film takes its Chinese-language title.

The events of the film are presented in three main segments from three perspectives: "Soldiers", "Adversaries", and "Gunners". These are followed by a final segment, "Bridge".

== Cast ==
- Wu Jing as former company lieutenant Guan Lei (关磊连长) who was demoted to just squad sergeant (关磊班长) after having been caught smoking in the battlefield. He was shot to pieces after running out of rounds at the open anti-aircraft gun (flak) while alerting his team about the position of the United States Air Force bomber pilot Hill with a flare gun.
- Zhang Yi as second lieutenant Zhang Fei (张飞排长) who assumed command of his company after Guan's smoking demotion and successfully hit Hill from the hidden artillery battery after Guan's sacrifice. He subsequently engaged in a shooting duel with Hill at great costs of his men and his own left arm and leg. Ultimately, he shot Hill down by evoking the spirit of the synonymous Zhang Fei at the Battle of Changban.
- Deng Chao as lieutenant of the 8th company Gao Fulai (高福来连长) whose company was ordered to be the last to cross the river. He would have to support the engineering company and help fix the bridge.
- Li Jiuxiao as third squad sergeant Liu Hao (刘浩班长) under Gao's command. He was eager to win a combat medal instead of fixing the bridge.
- Vision Wei as lieutenant Yan Rui (闫瑞连长) of the engineering company, responsible for fixing the bridge.
- Oho Ou as lieutenant for 7th company (七连长) who wanted to cross the bridge to meet up with the main force.
- Richard Dubintsov as U.S. Air Force bomber young pilot Colin who was shot down by Chinese AA-gun.
- Vladimir Ershov (Russian actor) as U.S. Air Force bomber pilot Hill Andrew (codename "Warthog"). He recognized without the bridge, it's the PVA's hell, but the situation would be reversed if the bridge stood. He tried to avenge Colin's death and killed Guan. His bomber also took out Zhang's left arm and leg, but he was eventually killed midair by Zhang in their third encounter, while nearing a thunderbird.
- Viktor Kulikov (Russian actor) as U.S. Air Force bomber pilot Smith who flew with Warthog by always maintaining his high altitude, citing his cousin at the United States Navy that a ceasefire negotiation would soon take place. After witnessing a large number of Katyusha rockets firing at the U.S. artillery base, he repeatedly said he didn't want to die and just wanted to leave the scene. After the two Chinese AA-flaks were down, he didn't shoot or bomb at the human bridge, while his backup support did. He survived to old age and also gave monologue during the film.

== Production ==
The project was officially greenlit in August 2020. Reports indicated that Wu Jing had begun filming in Dandong, Liaoning.

It is noteworthy that filming started in early August and the final touches were officially applied on 20 September, meaning that the movie was filmed in less than two months. Online commentators expressed concern that the tight production schedule might affect the final quality of the film, but also pointed out that based on precedents such as The Mission and Young and Dangerous, the film might still be worth looking forward to.

== Release ==
The film's release date was set for 23 October 2020, including 2D, IMAX, CGS, CINITY, and 4DX versions. Its release coincided with a week of official celebrations commemorating the 70th anniversary of China's participation in the Korean War.

The film grossed $173.8 million. It was the box office number-one film in China for weeks 42–45 of 2020.

== Reception ==
Audience reactions were positive. On the day of the film's release, its average rating out of 10 was 9.4 on Maoyan and 9.5 on Taopiaopiao.

Critics noted the film's originality, especially its polyphonic storytelling and its focus on the heroic role of ordinary soldiers.

Lu Fang of the Qianjiang Evening News wrote that although some viewers felt the movie's three-part structure made it repetitive, this was actually its most creative aspect. Lu praised the film's cinematography and acting, especially Zhang Yi's performance as gunner Zhang Fei, and said the third segment "Gunners" was thrilling.

American film critic Derek Elley wrote that the film was offbeat and original.

Critics felt that the second part of the film ("Adversaries"), focused on American pilots, was its weakest, with Derek Elley calling it "cliched and corny" and the Qianjiang Evening News describing the segment as too long and the acting overexaggerated.

Deutsche Welle reported that the September 2021 release of the film in South Korea was canceled by the local distributor after fierce opposition from veterans and politicians.

=== Awards ===
At the 12th Macau International Movie Festival, Zhang Yi won the Golden Lotus Award for Best Actor and Guan Hu won the Golden Lotus Award for Best Writing for The Sacrifice.

== See also ==
- The Eight Hundred, another 2020 war film written and directed by Guan Hu
