= List of A Great Way to Care episodes =

A Great Way to Care is a TVB medical drama series that premiered on 10 January 2011 in Hong Kong. The show follows Dr. Ko Lap-yan (Alex Fong, a dryly humorous and nonchalant criminal psychiatry expert who heads a team of psychiatrists at the fictional Yan Wo Hospital in Hong Kong. The series, told in a serialised format with two main story arcs, features Ko's team confronting different medical cases. The plot of each case spans from as short as one episode to four episodes. A Great Way to Care currently has two continuous series.

== Series overview ==
| Series | Episodes | First aired | Original HK broadcast | | | | |
| Series | Episodes | First aired | Episode premiere | Episode finale | Avg. ratings | Viewer | Rank |
|---|---|---|---|---|---|---|---|
| 1 | 20 | 2009 | 11 January 2011 | 5 February 2011 | 29 | 1.84 million | #8 |
| 2 | 25 | 2013 | 18 March 2013 | 19 April 2013 | TBA | TBA | TBA |

=== Series 1 (2011) ===
Produced in 2008, the first series premiered on TVB International's overseas cable affiliates on 8 June 2009, with 20 episodes. Although the series was slated to premiere in Hong Kong at around the same time, its broadcast was scrapped in order to make room to air Sweetness in the Salt. The entire first series of A Great Way to Care finally premiered in Hong Kong on 10 January 11. It was released as a 19-episode serial with two episodes back-to-back.

| Week | Eps. | Title | Directed by | Written by | HK viewers (million) | Ratings | Original release date |
|---|---|---|---|---|---|---|---|
| 1 | Episodes–5 | "Premiere week" | - | - | 1.84 | 29 | 10 January 2011 |
| 1 | Episodes–5 | "Premiere week" | - | - | 1.84 | 29 | 11 January 2011 |
| 1 | Episodes–5 | "Premiere week" | - | - | 1.84 | 29 | 12 January 2011 |
| 1 | Episodes–5 | "Premiere week" | - | - | 1.84 | 29 | 13 January 2011 |
| 1 | Episodes–5 | "Premiere week" | - | - | 1.84 | 29 | 14 January 2011 |
| 2 | Episodes–10 | "N/A" | - | - | 1.96 | 31 | 17 January 2011 |
| 2 | Episodes–10 | "N/A" | - | - | 1.96 | 31 | 18 January 2011 |
| 2 | Episodes–10 | "N/A" | - | - | 1.96 | 31 | 19 January 2011 |
| 2 | Episodes–10 | "N/A" | - | - | 1.96 | 31 | 20 January 2011 |
| 2 | Episodes–10 | "N/A" | - | - | 1.96 | 31 | 21 January 2011 |
| 3 | Episodes–14 | "N/A" | - | - | 1.90 | 30 | 24 January 2011 |
| 3 | Episodes–14 | "N/A" | - | - | 1.90 | 30 | 25 January 2011 |
| 3 | Episodes–14 | "N/A" | - | - | 1.90 | 30 | 26 January 2011 |
| 3 | Episodes–14 | "N/A" | - | - | 1.90 | 30 | 27 January 2011 |
| 4 | Episodes–18 | "Finale week" | - | - | 1.71 | 27 | 31 January 2011 |
| 4 | Episodes–18 | "Finale week" | - | - | 1.71 | 27 | N/A |
| 4 | Episodes–18 | "Finale week" | - | - | 1.71 | 27 | N/A |
| 4 | Episodes–18 | "Finale week" | - | - | 1.71 | 27 | 4 February 2011 |
| 4 | Episodes–20 | "Finale episode" | - | - | 1.45 | 23 | 5 February 2011 |

=== Series 2 (2013) ===
A Great Way to Care was renewed for a second series in early 2012. The sequel is slated to premiere on 18 March 2013.

| Week | Eps. | Title | Directed by | Written by | HK viewers (million) | Ratings | Original release date |
|---|---|---|---|---|---|---|---|
| 1 | Episodes–5 | "Premiere week" | - | - | - | - | 18 March 2013 |
| 1 | Episodes–5 | "Premiere week" | - | - | - | - | 19 March 2013 |
| 1 | Episodes–5 | "Premiere week" | - | - | - | - | 20 March 2013 |
| 1 | Episodes–5 | "Premiere week" | - | - | - | - | 21 March 2013 |
| 1 | Episodes–5 | "Premiere week" | - | - | - | - | 22 March 2013 |
| 2 | Episodes–10 | "N/A" | - | - | - | - | 25 March 2013 |
| 2 | Episodes–10 | "N/A" | - | - | - | - | 26 March 2013 |
| 2 | Episodes–10 | "N/A" | - | - | - | - | 27 March 2013 |
| 2 | Episodes–10 | "N/A" | - | - | - | - | 28 March 2013 |
| 2 | Episodes–10 | "N/A" | - | - | - | - | 29 March 2013 |
| 3 | Episodes–15 | "N/A" | - | - | - | - | 1 April 2013 |
| 3 | Episodes–15 | "N/A" | - | - | - | - | 2 April 2013 |
| 3 | Episodes–15 | "N/A" | - | - | - | - | 3 April 2013 |
| 3 | Episodes–15 | "N/A" | - | - | - | - | 4 April 2013 |
| 3 | Episodes–15 | "N/A" | - | - | - | - | 5 April 2013 |
| 4 | Episodes–20 | "N/A" | - | - | - | - | 8 April 2013 |
| 4 | Episodes–20 | "N/A" | - | - | - | - | 9 April 2013 |
| 4 | Episodes–20 | "N/A" | - | - | - | - | 10 April 2013 |
| 4 | Episodes–20 | "N/A" | - | - | - | - | 11 April 2013 |
| 4 | Episodes–20 | "N/A" | - | - | - | - | 12 April 2013 |
| 5 | Episodes–25 | "Finale week" | - | - | - | - | 15 April 2013 |
| 5 | Episodes–25 | "Finale week" | - | - | - | - | 16 April 2013 |
| 5 | Episodes–25 | "Finale week" | - | - | - | - | 17 April 2013 |
| 5 | Episodes–25 | "Finale week" | - | - | - | - | 18 April 2013 |
| 5 | Episodes–25 | "Finale week" | - | - | - | - | 19 April 2013 |
