= Golden Lotus Award for Best Picture =

Annual Chinese film award

The Golden Lotus Award for Best Picture (simplified Chinese: 金莲花奖最佳影片; traditional Chinese: 金蓮花獎最佳影片) is one of the Golden Lotus Awards presented annually since the awards debuted in 2009, by the Macau Film and Television Media Association and China International Cultural Communication Center.

== Award winners and nominees ==
=== 2000s ===
==== 2009 (1st) ====
Year	Winner and nominees (English)	Winner and nominees (Mandarin)	Director (English)	Director (Mandarin)
2009	Not Without You	《不能没有你》	Leon Dai	戴立忍

=== 2010s ===
==== 2010 (2nd) ====
Year	Winner and nominees (English)	Winner and nominees (Mandarin)	Director (English)	Director (Mandarin)
2010	Mr. Bedman	《弹簧床先生》	Dai Tailong	戴泰龙
2010	Wild Strawberries	《野草莓》	Chen Bing	陈兵
2010	Charlie Valentine	《查理的情人》	Jesse Johnson	杰西·约翰逊
2010	You and Me	《我和你》	Hu Yaozhi	扈耀之

==== 2011 (3rd) ====
Year	Winner and nominees (English)	Winner and nominees (Mandarin)	Director (English)	Director (Mandarin)
2011	The Lost Bladesman	《关云长》	Siu Fai Mak and Felix Chong	麦兆辉、庄文强
2011	The Woman Knight of Mirror Lake	《竞雄女侠·秋瑾》	Herman Yau	邱礼涛
2011	The Devil Inside Me	《夺命心跳》	Zhang Qi	张琦
2011	Mindfulness and Murder	《正义与杀戮》	Tom Waller	汤姆·沃勒

==== 2012 (4th) ====
Year	Winner and nominees (English)	Winner and nominees (Mandarin)	Director (English)	Director (Mandarin)
2012	Outbreak Mother	《暴走妈妈》	Gao Bo	高博
2012	Happy Hotel	《乐翻天》	Wang Yuelun	王岳伦
2012	Stand-In	《做次有钱人》	Wan Li	万里
2012	Xiao Xing Tian Xia	《孝行天下》	Ye Huaijun	叶怀军
2012	Iron Man: Wang Jinxi	《铁人王进喜》	Song Jiangbo	宋江波

==== 2013 (5th) ====
Year	Winner and nominees (English)	Winner and nominees (Mandarin)	Director (English)	Director (Mandarin)
2013	Amazing	《神奇》	Sherwood Hu	胡雪桦
2013	CZ12	《十二生肖》	Jackie Chan	成龙
2013	Saving General Yang	《忠烈杨家将》	Ronny Yu	于仁泰
2013	The Viral Factor	《逆战》	Dante Lam	林超贤

==== 2014 (6th) ====
Year	Winner and nominees (English)	Winner and nominees (Mandarin)	Director (English)	Director (Mandarin)
2014	Coming Home	《归来》	Zhang Yimou	张艺谋
2014	But Always	《一生一世》	Zou Xian	邹佡
2014	That Demon Within	《魔警》	Dante Lam	林超贤
2014	Beijing Love Story	《北京爱情故事》	Chen Sicheng	陈思诚
2014	Kung Fu Jungle	《一个人的武林》	Teddy Chan	陈德森

==== 2015 (7th) ====
Year	Winner and nominees (English)	Winner and nominees (Mandarin)	Director (English)	Director (Mandarin)
2015	Wolf Totem	《狼圖騰》	Jean-Jacques Annaud	尚-賈克·阿諾
2015	12 Citizens	《十二公民》	Xu Ang	徐昂
2015	Ip Man 3	《葉問3》	Wilson Yip	葉偉信
2015	Mr. Six	《老炮兒》	Guan Hu	管虎
2015	Happiness	《幸運是我》	Law Yiu-fai	羅耀輝

==== 2016 (8th) ====
Year	Winner and nominees (English)	Winner and nominees (Mandarin)	Director (English)	Director (Mandarin)
2016	My War	《我的战争》	Oxide Pang	彭順
2016	Good Luck, Dad	《让我怎么相信你》	Liang Qing'er, Liang Xiaoliang	梁青儿, 梁小凉
2016	Xuanzang	《大唐玄奘》	Huo Jianqi	霍建起
2016	Chinese Wine	《国酒》	Song Jiangbo	宋江波
2016	Lord of Shanghai	《上海王》	Sherwood Hu	胡雪桦
2016	Being A Cop	《警察不好当》	Meng Haojun	孟浩军

==== 2017 (9th) ====
Year	Winner and nominees (English)	Winner and nominees (Mandarin)	Director (English)	Director (Mandarin)
2017	Youth	《芳华》	Feng Xiaogang	冯小刚
2017	The Founding of an Army	《建军大业》	Andrew Lau	刘伟强
2017	The Kid from the Big Apple 2: Before We Forget	《我来自纽约2:当我们在一起》	Jess Teong	張爵西
2017	Old Beast	《老獸》	Zhou Ziyang	周子陽
2017	Seventy-Seven Days	《七十七天》	Zhao Hantang	趙漢唐
2017	Baahubali 2: The Conclusion	《巴霍巴利王2》	S. S. Rajamouli	S·S·拉贾穆里
2017	Never Say Die	《羞羞的铁拳》	Song Yang/Zhang Chiyu	宋陽/張吃魚
2017	A Loner	《大雪冬至》	Xing Xiao	刑瀟
