= Old Beast =

- Poster
- Traditional Chinese: 老獸
- Simplified Chinese: 老兽
- Hanyu Pinyin: Lǎo shòu
- Directed by: Zhou Ziyang
- Written by: Zhou Ziyang
- Produced by: Wang Xiaoshuai; Liu Xuan
- Starring: Tu Men
- Cinematography: Matthias Delvaux
- Edited by: Li Xinzhu
- Music by: Song Yuzhe
- Production company: Dongchun Films
- Release dates: July 24, 2017 (FIRST International Film Festival); December 11, 2017 (China)
- Running time: 108 minutes
- Country: China
- Language: Mandarin

Old Beast is a 2017 Chinese drama film written and directed by Zhou Ziyang, and produced by Wang Xiaoshuai and Liu Xuan. The story mainly takes place in the city of Ordos in Inner Mongolia.

== Cast ==
- Tu Men as Lao Yang
- Wang Chaobei as Bing
- Su Feng as Liang
- Yi Danna as Lixia
- Wang Mingshuo as Mei
- Alatengwula as Lu
- Hao Qiaoling as Lao Yang's wife
- Wang Zizi as Lili
- Sun Jiaqin as Qin
- Yan Liyang

== Awards and nominations ==
| Award | Category | Recipients | Result | Ref. |
|---|---|---|---|---|
| 54th Golden Horse Awards | Best Leading Actor | Tu Men | Won | |
| 54th Golden Horse Awards | Best New Director | Zhou Ziyang | Nominated | |
| 54th Golden Horse Awards | Best Original Screenplay | Zhou Ziyang | Won | |
| 54th Golden Horse Awards | Best Cinematography | Matthias Delvaux | Nominated | |
| 54th Golden Horse Awards | FIPRESCI Prize | Old Beast | Won | |
| 30th Tokyo International Film Festival | Asian Future Special Mention | Zhou Ziyang | Won | |
| 9th Macau International Movie Festival | Best Picture | Old Beast | Nominated | |
| 9th Macau International Movie Festival | Best Actor | Tu Men | Nominated | |
| 9th Macau International Movie Festival | Best Writing | Zhou Ziyang | Nominated | |
| 9th China Film Director's Guild Awards | Best Film | Old Beast | Nominated | |
| 9th China Film Director's Guild Awards | Best Director | Zhou Ziyang | Nominated | |
| 9th China Film Director's Guild Awards | Best Young Director | Zhou Ziyang | Won | |
| 9th China Film Director's Guild Awards | Best Screenwriter | Zhou Ziyang | Nominated | |
| 9th China Film Director's Guild Awards | Best Actor | Tu Men | Won | |
