= Huang Zhizhong =

Chinese actor

- Born: 5 March 1969 (age 56); Tianjin, China
- Occupation: Actor

Chinese name
- Traditional Chinese: 黃志忠
- Simplified Chinese: 黄志忠
Transcriptions

Huang Zhizhong, (simplified Chinese: 黄志忠; traditional Chinese: 黃志忠; pinyin: Hǘang Zhìzhōng) born 5 March 1969 in Tianjin, China is a Chinese actor.

== Background ==
Huang was a basketball player at a young age. After he retired from basketball team, he worked in Tianjin Textile manufacturing factory as a Machinist fitter. Later, he entered the Tianjin Trade union Academy for a short training. In 1991, Huang attended the Central Academy of Drama, where he graduated in 1995. He has since go on to star in numerous TV dramas and films, he is famous known by most audience since historical TV series The Road We Have Taken 2009.

== Filmography ==
- Infernal Affairs III (2003)
- Ming Dynasty in 1566 (2007)
- The Road We Have Taken (2009)
- My War (2016)
- Our Time Will Come (2017)
- The Founding of an Army (2017)
- Line Walker 2: Invisible Spy (2019)
- The Captain (2019)
- The Eight Hundred (2019)
- Royal Nirvana (2019)
- Tianxia Changhe (2022)
