= An End to Killing =

- Film poster
- Chinese: 止杀令
- Hanyu Pinyin: Zhǐ Shā Lìng
- Directed by: Wang Ping
- Written by: Ran Ping
- Produced by: Ran Ping
- Starring: Zhao Youliang; Geng Le; Tu Men; Park Ye-jin
- Distributed by: Boram Entertainment
- Release date: March 23, 2013
- Running time: 108 minutes
- Country: China
- Language: Chinese

An End to Killing (Chinese: 止杀令; pinyin: Zhǐ Shā Lìng, also known as Kingdom of Conquerors) is a 2013 Chinese historical action war film directed by Wang Ping, and written and produced by Ran Ping. It tells that in the 1200s, a man arose whose ruthlessness was so feared, he emerged as the greatest empire builder ever known to mankind. Inspired by true historical events.

== Cast ==
- Zhao Youliang as Master Qiu Chuji
- Park Ye-jin as Khulan
- Tu Men as Genghis Khan
- Elvis Tsui as Yelü Chucai (Long Beard)
- Geng Le as General Liu Zhonglu
- Li Xiaoran as Inn's Proprietress
- Yu Shaoqun as Disciple Zhao Dao'an
