= Youth (2017 film) =

- Theatrical release poster
- Traditional Chinese: 芳華
- Simplified Chinese: 芳华
- Literal meaning: Youthfulness
- Hanyu Pinyin: fānghuá
- Directed by: Feng Xiaogang
- Written by: Geling Yan
- Produced by: Wang Zhonglei
- Starring: Huang Xuan; Miao Miao; Zhong Chuxi; Yang Caiyu
- Edited by: Zhang Qi
- Distributed by: IM Global
- Release dates: September 7, 2017 (TIFF); December 15, 2017 (China)
- Running time: 135 minutes
- Country: China
- Language: Mandarin
- Budget: CN¥120 million (US$16.5 million)
- Box office: US$235.9 million

Youth (Chinese: 芳华) is a 2017 Chinese period drama film directed by Feng Xiaogang and written by Geling Yan. The film is based on Yan's semi-autobiographical story You Touched Me. It was screened in the Special Presentations section at the 2017 Toronto International Film Festival. It was scheduled to be released in China on October 1, 2017, but after previews in Beijing and other cities was pulled from the National Day schedule. It was released on 15 December 2017.

Youth grossed over $235 million worldwide, becoming the sixth highest-grossing Chinese film of 2017.

== Synopsis ==
The film chronicles the lives of a group of idealistic adolescents in a military art troupe in the People's Liberation Army during the Cultural Revolution. They experience love, lust, betrayal, and sufferings in the background of Mao era songs and dances. Through the narration of Xiao Suizi, the film follows the story of two key characters, Feng Liu and He Xiaoping. Xiaoping is a naive and innocent new recruit from Beijing, and Feng Liu is a morally impeccable character, whose comrades praise for being a real life Lei Feng. The pair also participate in the Sino-Vietnamese War in 1979 and become heroes for their act of courage.

Xiaoping eventually becomes the target of her roommates bullying for her provincial naive mannerisms. The majority of the acts are spearheaded by Hao Shuwen, the daughter of the regional commander.

After the war, they are honorably discharged from the Army but struggle to make ends meet in the Reform-era China while they learn lessons from soul-crushing experiences of love, lust, betrayal, and heartbreak.

== Cast ==
- Huang Xuan (黄轩) as Liu Feng (刘峰)
- Miao Miao (苗苗) as He Xiaoping (何小萍)
- Zhong Chuxi (钟楚曦) as Xiao Suizi (萧穗子)
- Yang Caiyu (杨采钰) as Lin Dingding (林丁丁)
- Li Xiaofeng (李晓峰) as Hao Shuwen (郝淑雯)
- Wang Tianchen (王天辰) as Chen Can (陈灿)
- Wang Keru (王可如) as Xiao Balei (小芭蕾)
- Su Yan (苏岩) as the dance teacher
- Zhao Lixin (赵立新) as the commissar
- Sui Yuan (隋源) as Zhuoma (卓玛)
- Zhang Renbo (张仁博) as Zhu Ke (朱克)
- Zhou Fang (周放) as the head nurse
- Xue Qi (薛祺) as Secretary Wu (吴干事)
- Yang Shuo (杨烁) as the military chief
- Tao Hai (陶海) as the Psychiatrist

== Awards and nominations ==
| Awards | Category | Recipient | Result | Ref. |
|---|---|---|---|---|
| 25th Beijing College Student Film Festival | Best Film | Youth | Nominated | |
| 25th Beijing College Student Film Festival | Best Director | Feng Xiaogang | Won | |
| 25th Beijing College Student Film Festival | Best Newcomer | Miao Miao | Won | |
| 25th Beijing College Student Film Festival | Best Newcomer | Zhong Chuxi | Won | |
| 23rd Huading Awards | Best Film | Youth | Nominated | |
| 23rd Huading Awards | Best Director | Feng Xiaogang | Nominated | |
| 23rd Huading Awards | Best Actor | Huang Xuan | Nominated | |
| 23rd Huading Awards | Best Newcomer | Miao Miao | Nominated | |
| 23rd Huading Awards | Best Newcomer | Zhong Chuxi | Won | |
| 23rd Huading Awards | Best Screenwriter | Geling Yan | Nominated | |
| 9th China Film Director's Guild Awards | Best Film | Youth | Won | |
| 9th China Film Director's Guild Awards | Best Director | Feng Xiaogang | Nominated | |
| 9th China Film Director's Guild Awards | Best Actor | Huang Xuan | Nominated | |
| 9th China Film Director's Guild Awards | Best Actress | Zhong Chuxi | Nominated | |
| 37th Hong Kong Film Awards | Best Film from Mainland and Taiwan | Youth | Nominated | |
| 12th Asian Film Awards | Best Film | Youth | Won | |
| 12th Asian Film Awards | Best Director | Feng Xiaogang | Nominated | |
| 12th Asian Film Awards | Best Newcomer | Zhong Chuxi | Nominated | |
| 12th Asian Film Awards | Best Screenplay | Geling Yan | Nominated | |
| 12th Asian Film Awards | Best Editing | Zhang Qi | Nominated | |
| 54th Golden Horse Awards | Best Adapted Screenplay | Geling Yan | Nominated | |
| 54th Golden Horse Awards | Best New Performer | Zhong Chuxi | Nominated | |
| 54th Golden Horse Awards | Best Art Direction | Shi Haiying | Nominated | |
| 54th Golden Horse Awards | Best Makeup & Costume Design | Liu Xiaoli | Nominated | |
| 9th Macau International Movie Festival | Best Picture | Youth | Won | |
| 9th Macau International Movie Festival | Best Director | Feng Xiaogang | Won | |
| 9th Macau International Movie Festival | Best Writing | Geling Yan | Won | |
| 9th Macau International Movie Festival | Best Actor | Huang Xuan | Nominated | |
| 9th Macau International Movie Festival | Best Cinematography | Luo Pan | Won | |
| 1st Marianas International Film Festival | Best Picture | Youth | Won | |
| 1st Marianas International Film Festival | Best Director | Feng Xiaogang | Won | |
| 1st Marianas International Film Festival | Best Screenplay | Geling Yan | Nominated | |
| 1st Marianas International Film Festival | Best Supporting Actress | Yang Caiyu | Won | |
| 1st Marianas International Film Festival | Best Cinematography | Luo Pan | Nominated | |
| 1st Marianas International Film Festival | Best Original Film Score | Zhao Lin | Nominated | |
| 1st Marianas International Film Festival | Best New Artist | Miao Miao | Nominated | |
| 1st Marianas International Film Festival | Best New Artist | Zhong Chuxi | Won | |

== Externals ==
- Youth at IMDb
