= The Founding of an Army =

- Film poster
- Traditional Chinese: 建軍大業
- Simplified Chinese: 建军大业
- Hanyu Pinyin: Jiànjūn Dàyè
- Directed by: Andrew Lau
- Written by: Dong Zhe; Zhao Ningyu; Han Sanping; Huang Jianxin
- Produced by: Han Sanping; Huang Jianxin; Zhao Haicheng
- Starring: Liu Ye; Zhu Yawen; Huang Zhizhong; Wang Jingchun; Oho Ou
- Cinematography: Edmond Fung; Andrew Lau
- Edited by: Azrael Chung
- Music by: Chan Kwong-wing; Chen Zhiyi
- Production companies: China Film Group Corporation; Bona Film Group; Nanchang Radio and TV Station; August First Film Studio; Shanghai Sanciyuan Entertainment; Emperor Motion Pictures; Sun Entertainment Culture; Media Asia Film
- Distributed by: China Film Group Corporation; Distribution Workshop
- Release date: 28 July 2017
- Running time: 133 minutes
- Country: China
- Language: Mandarin

The Founding of an Army is a 2017 Chinese historical drama produced by the China Film Group Corporation to commemorate the 90th anniversary of the founding of the People's Liberation Army. Produced by Han Sanping and directed by Andrew Lau, it is the third installment of the Founding of New China trilogy, along with The Founding of a Republic (2009) and The Founding of a Party (2011). The film features a star-studded cast of Chinese actors. It was released on July 28, 2017, to mark the 90th anniversary of the founding of the People's Liberation Army.

== Plot ==
The story begins in 1927 at the beginning of the Nanchang uprising, known as the first major Kuomintang–Communist engagement.

== Cast ==
- Liu Ye as Mao Zedong
- Zhu Yawen as Zhou Enlai
- Huang Zhizhong as Zhu De
- Wang Jingchun as He Long
- Oho Ou as Ye Ting
- Liu Haoran as Su Yu
- Ma Tianyu as Lin Biao
- Xiao Ai as Ye Jianying
- Lay Zhang as Lu Deming
- Li Yifeng as He Changgong
- Bai Yu as Cai Qingchuan
- Liang Dawei as Chen Geng
- Yu Hewei as Chen Duxiu
- Wu Yue as Zhang Guotao
- Bai Ke as Di Qiubai
- Liu Xun Zi Mo as Cai Hesen
- Dong Zijian as Deng Xiaoping
- Chen Xiao as Ren Bishi
- Zhang Dapeng as Liu Bocheng
- Bao Jianfeng as Tan Pingchuan
- Song Yang as Wang Shouhua
- Ye Xiaowei as Chen Yi
- Ashton Chen as Nie Rongzhen
- Li Xian as Luo Ronghang
- Li Mincheng as Zhou Yiqun
- Wang Zhao as Tan Zheng
- Li Qin as Yang Kaihui
- Song Jia as Soong Ching-ling
- Guan Xiaotong as Deng Yingchao
- Ma Yili as Xiang Jingyu
- Zhou Dongyu as Fan Jiaxia
- Feng Wenjuan as Peng Yuanhua
- Wang Qinxiang as Zhang Zuolin
- Han Geng as Zhang Xueliang
- Wang Ting as Si Lie
- Michael Chen as Si Li
- Cao Kefan
- Daniel Wu as Hu Hanming
- Wallace Huo as Chiang Kai-shek
- Zhang Tianai as Soong Mei-ling
- Zhang Junhan as Chen Lifu
- Yu Shaoqun as Wang Jingwei
- William Chan as Triad boss
- Zhang Hanyu as Du Yuesheng
- Zhou Yiwei
- Yu Ailei as Zhang Fakui
- Marc Ma as Zhao Fusheng
- Tony Yang as Qian Dajun
- Huang Shang-Ho
- Joseph Cheng as Yu Jishi
- Lu Han as Lian luo yuan (Liaison Officer)
- Tong Ruihuan as Zeng Zhongming
- Zheng Kai
- Winston Chao
- Liu Zhibing
- Alex Fong
- Tang Baoqiang
- Ma Zhengqiang
- Wang Zhifei

== Release ==
=== Critical response ===
On July 25, 2017, film director Ye Daying (叶大鹰), the grandson of General Ye Ting, criticized the film on Sina Weibo as follows: "The revolutionary history is seriously entertaining. It is a reproach and distortion of the revolutionary history." Ye Daying also sent an open letter to the State Administration of Press, Publication, Radio, Film and Television (SAPPRFT), which was signed by more than 25 revolutionary successors, many of them are generations of higher military officials. They demanded an apology to their family from the producer.

The page of the film on Douban, the leading film review website in China, has forbidden any rating or comment by its users since July 2017.

=== Asian release ===
This film was only released in Southeast Asia within Malaysia, Brunei Darussalam, and Estonia before the ASEAN international film exhibit.

== Soundtrack ==
建军大业 电影原声大碟

Soundtrack album by Chan Kwong-wing
- Released: July 26, 2017
- Studio: Click Music
- Genre: Film score
- Length: 48:43
- Language: Mandarin
- Producer: 完美青春（成都）文化传播有限公司

Chan Kwong-wing chronology
杀破狼II 电影原声带 (2015)	建军大业 电影原声大碟 (2017)	四海 电影原声专辑 (2022)

Track listing
No.	Title	Length
1.	"建军大业"	01:19
2.	"孙中山的话"	02:04
3.	"黑日来临" (feat. 香港歌剧社合唱团)	04:46
4.	"痛"	01:14
5.	"计"	01:01
6.	"悲恸"	01:51
7.	"武汉之会"	01:55
8.	"一刻的平静"	00:54
9.	"命令"	02:27
10.	"南昌之战" (feat. 香港歌剧社合唱团)	12:53
11.	"再见故乡" (feat. 朱韵文)	01:24
12.	"希望"	02:45
13.	"决战三河坝"	02:39
14.	"血的致敬"	02:54
15.	"同归于尽"	01:59
16.	"幸存者" (feat. 香港歌剧社合唱团)	04:54
17.	"星星之火 可以燎原" (feat. 香港歌剧社合唱团)	01:44
Total length:		48:43

== Awards and nominations ==
Award	Category	Nominee	Result	Ref.
9th Macau International Movie Festival	Best Picture	The Founding of an Army	Nominated	
9th Macau International Movie Festival	Best Director	Andrew Lau	Nominated	
9th Macau International Movie Festival	Best Supporting Actor	Zhang Yixing	Nominated	
9th China Film Director's Guild Awards	Best Film	The Founding of an Army	Nominated	
37th Hong Kong Film Awards	Best Visual Effects	Victor Wong, Eman Tse	Nominated	
23rd Huading Awards	Best Film	The Founding of an Army	Nominated	
25th Beijing College Student Film Festival	Jury Award	The Founding of an Army	Nominated	
14th Changchun Film Festival	Best Original Music Score	Chen Guangrong, Chen Zhiyi	Won	
34th Hundred Flowers Awards	Best Picture	The Founding of an Army	Nominated	
34th Hundred Flowers Awards	Outstanding Picture	The Founding of an Army	Won	
34th Hundred Flowers Awards	Best Writing	Han Sanping, Huang Jianxin, Dong Zhe, Zhao Ningyu	Nominated	
34th Hundred Flowers Awards	Best Actor	Zhu Yawen	Nominated	
34th Hundred Flowers Awards	Best Actress	Li Qin	Nominated	
34th Hundred Flowers Awards	Best Supporting Actor	Ma Tianyu	Nominated	
34th Hundred Flowers Awards	Best Supporting Actress	Zhang Tian'ai	Nominated	
