= 72 Heroes =

- Film poster
- Traditional Chinese: 英雄喋血
- Simplified Chinese: 英雄喋血
- Hanyu Pinyin: Yīng Xióng Dié Xuè
- Jyutping: Jing1 Hung4 Dip4 Hyut3
- Directed by: Derek Chiu
- Screenplay by: Wang Mei
- Produced by: Wang Jiancheng; Jiang Baoshan; Choi Jae-hong
- Starring: Liu Kai-chi; Tse Kwan Ho; Irene Wan; Elanne Kong; Wang Jiancheng; Zhao Bingrui; Eric Tsang; Alan Tam; Oh U Jeong; Li Zhi; Zhang Yang
- Cinematography: Edmond Fung
- Edited by: Wang Chao
- Music by: Su Junjie
- Production company: Pearl River Film
- Distributed by: Pearl River Film; China Film Promotion International
- Release dates: 16 September 2011 (China); 15 September 2012 (Hong Kong)
- Running time: 112 minutes
- Country: China
- Language: Mandarin

72 Heroes is a 2011 Chinese historical drama film directed by Hong Kong film director Derek Chiu, better known as Sung Kee Chiu, based on the story of the 72 Martyrs who sacrificed their lives in the Second Guangzhou Uprising.

== Plot ==
The film takes place in Huizhou, Guangdong, China in October 1900. After failing to assassinate the governor-general by blowing up his mansion as part of the anti-Manchu Huizhou Uprising, revolutionary Shi Jianru is captured and executed. Guangzhou, Guangdong province, 1911: following other unsuccessful uprisings, Pan Dawei, deputy head of the Guangzhou department of the Tongmenghui, arrives by boat and smuggles weapons past customs officers. During a dinner party at the house of wealthy local trader Fang Hongzhi, head of the Guangxing business association, there is an assassination attempt on the Manchu Qing government's Marine Minister Li Zhun, which fails. Among the guests is Luo Zhonghuo, just arrived from Penang, Malaysia, who gets to know Fang's daughter, Huiru, also a revolutionary. Afterwards she takes him to the house of painter Gao Jianfu, head of the Tongmenghui's Guangzhou department. Zhonghuo is carrying a letter from Tongmenghui leader Sun Yat-sen, but neither Jianfu nor Dawei are sure whether he is a spy. To convince them he is genuine, Huiru suggests he tries raising some money for the movement from her father, by first becoming friendly with his cultured longtime mistress Jiang Meixi. Zhonghuo becomes Meixi's English tutor and helps Fang in getting a local gang off of the Guangxing's turf. As Chinese New Year arrives, Gao and Pan plan a mass suicide attack on the governor-general's residence - in what will become known as the Second Guangzhou Uprising of 27 April 1911.

== Cast ==
- Liu Kai-chi as Gao Jianfu
- Tse Kwan-ho as Pan Dawei
- Irene Wan as Jiang Meixi
- Elanne Kong as Fang Huiru
- Wang Jiancheng as Fang Hongzhi
- Zhao Bingrui as Luo Zhonghan
- Eric Tsang as Li Zhi
- Alan Tam as Hunag Ying
- Oh U Jeong as Fang's female bodyguard
- Li Zhi
- Zhang Yang
- Wu Jian as A Hui
- Bosco Wong
- Raymond Lam

== See also ==
- 1911 (film)
