= A Chinese Odyssey Part Three =

2016 Chinese-Hong Kong film by Jeffrey Lau

- Poster
- Chinese: 大话西游3
- Directed by: Jeffrey Lau
- Screenplay by: Jeffrey Lau
- Based on: Journey to the West by Wu Cheng'en
- Produced by: Sharon Yeung; Marco Mak; Chen Liang; Cyrus Ho
- Starring: Han Geng; Tiffany Tang; Jacky Wu; Karen Mok; Gillian Chung
- Cinematography: Billy Ko
- Edited by: Marco Mak; Wang Gai-gai
- Music by: Lowell Lo
- Production companies: Chunqiu Shidai (Tianjin) Pictures; Star Alliance Movies
- Distributed by: Horgos Chunqiu Time Media; Beijing Joy Pictures; Tianjing Yinhe Media; Huaxia Film Distribution; Shaw Organisation
- Release date: 14 September 2016 (China)
- Running time: 93 minutes
- Countries: China; Hong Kong
- Languages: Mandarin; Cantonese
- Budget: US$20 million
- Box office: US$48.4 million

A Chinese Odyssey Part Three is a 2016 fantasy comedy drama film directed by Jeffrey Lau. A Chinese-Hong Kong co-production, it was released in China on 14 September 2016. It won the Golden Angel Award for Film at the 12th Chinese American Film Festival. The film is a sequel to parts one and two of A Chinese Odyssey.

== Plot ==
Taking place in an alternate timeline, Fairy Zixia used the Pandora's Box to travel forward in time to see the consequences of leaving a tear drop in Joker's heart, which led to her "demise" and Joker being revealed as the reincarnation of the Monkey King. Fearing for her life and Joker's mental well being, she denounced her relationship to Joker, which led to him asking about what happened in the future. Zixia revealed to him the fact that she left a mark in Joker's heart, leading to Bai Jing Jing realizing that Joker will eventually stop having feelings for her, leading him to fall for Zixia.

However, Zixia withheld the information about Joker being the Monkey King's reincarnation and tried to make things right by forcing Joker into meeting with Bai Jing Jing much earlier than in the original timeline. Unfortunately, Joker had already stopped having feelings for Jing-Jing and prevented Zixia's plan from going any further resulting in a slap from Zixia. After having a talk with Qingxia (Zixia's twin sister trapped in her body), Zixia decided to go the Bull Demon King and marry him so Joker can stop falling for her so she left Joker - who was looking for her after being slapped - alone by himself.

Joker continues his search for Zixia in the desert, where he witnessed this timeline's version of the Monkey King being subdued by Guanyin, with the difference being that the Longevity Monk used the Pandora's Box to escape from being killed by the Monkey King and the time to subdue the Monkey King took longer than expected. After Guanyin left with the subdued Monkey King, Joker found himself left with the returning Longevity Monk and both were caught together by the Bull Demon King, being happy about having a second wife and the Longevity Monk being captured.

Meanwhile, in Heaven, Guanyin handed over the subdued Monkey King to the Jade Emperor, discussing about the overwhelming presence of demons and fearing that the Sealed Book had a mistake in it, which Jade Emperor reassures her that the Book is never wrong. As Guanyin left to report the progress to the Buddha, the Jade Emperor unsealed the Monkey King, who is revealed to be the Six-Eared Monkey, revealing that the Sealed Book did not mention about the Monkey King in the initial pilgrimage at all as he was born 500 years later as Joker, causing the Jade Emperor to get the Six-Eared Monkey fill in the role until Joker arrived from the future. This eventually leads to the Jade Emperor betraying the Six-Eared Monkey and have him slowly burn in the Great Oven.

In the residence of the Bull Demon King, Zixia and Qingxia were talking about the possible married life with the Bull Demon King, with Zixia realizing that the Pandora's Box was missing and suspecting that Qingxia had given it to the Six-Eared Monkey, with a flashback revealing that she was an ex-lover of his. Zixia was soon confronted with Princess Iron Fan (铁扇公主) and her son Red Child (红孩子), resulting in a fight between the two women, leading Zixia being blown past the just arrived Bull Demon King, Joker and Longevity Monk. The Bull Demon King, realizes the trouble he's in and instructs Joker to take the Longevity Monk and Zixia to his sister, Xiang Xiang while he tries to stall the Princess for time. While on the run, Joker demands to know why Zixia left him alone whereas the Longevity Monk accidentally found a way to leave by freeing one of the Bull King's Giant Bulls. The trio escaped, but were chased by Red Child until both Joker and Logevity Monk accidentally stole his fire wheels (used for flight).

Upon arriving at Xiang Xiang's Palace, the trio met with Xiang Xiang and, much to their horror, witnessed her devouring a man whole. She challenged the trio and defeated them, leading them to being locked up in the dungeon. It was then that Zixia tells Joker about her demise in the original timeline, and why she tried so hard to stop Joker from developing feelings for her. At the same time, the Bull Demon King arrived to reconcile with Xiang Xiang about the execution of her lover, Mantis, by his own hands, which she rejected as Mantis was the only true love to her. It was at this time that the Longevity Monk played the main theme of the entire A Chinese Odyssey series, leading to Joker and Zixia kissing at the end of the song. The Demon Bull King and Xiang Xiang saw the silhouettes of them kissing, causing the siblings to burst into the dungeon only to see the Longevity Monk taking Zixia's place. When Xiang Xiang saw this, she ended up drooling implying that she's interested in Joker, thus allowing the Bull Demon King giving his blessing to Joker for Xiang Xiang's hand in marriage.

While preparations for the Bull Demon King's 2nd wedding is underway, Joker and Xiang Xiang talked about Mantis and the reason she did not use the Pandora's Box to prevent his death while the Bull Demon King tried to impress Zixia. He asked Joker for tips on how to impress Zixia, with Joker using the Pandora's Box multiple times, the first few times to play a game on the Bull King, 2 times to get rid of the Bull King and Xiang Xiang, and the last to get himself and Zixia away from the ceremony, only for the plan to backfire forcing all 4 of them to return. The Bull Demon King, angry at the series of events, tries to kill Joker while Xiang Xiang chases after Zixia, only to have Zixia captured while Qingxia was forced out of Zixia's body. The Bull Demon King's rampaging was soon interrupted by the arrival of his wife, Princess Iron Fan and Red Child, only for him and Red Kid to find out the Princess had an affair with the Monkey King, causing him to punish Joker and Zixia by forcing them to marry at the ceremony.

Meanwhile, in Heaven, the Jade Emperor was shocked to find out the Sealed Book had changed, forcing him to free Six-Ear Monkey from the Great Oven, and accidentally revealing to him that the Longevity Monk is the Monkey and Qingxia's son and finding out that Qingxia knew everything about the mistake in the Sealed Book. Thus, the Jade Emperor allowed Qingxia to repossess her body and let Six-Eared Monkey to go rescue his son while still under the guise of the Monkey King. Six-Eared Monkey crashed the wedding, revealed that he started the affair with the Princess, while maintaining "the fact" that Joker is not the Monkey King, and started battling with the entire Bull household, with Qingxia arriving later rescue Zixia from Xiang Xiang and trading places with Zixia in order for the prophecy to remain true, with a few changes. The battle ended up with the Bull siblings finally reconciled as Xiang Xiang being forced to consume her brother just so to have a fighting chance against Six-Eared Monkey. The Heavenly Army arrived to provide backup for Six-Eared Monkey, Qingxia sustaining a blow in the process. As he saw this, Six-Eared Monkey breaks free from Xiang Xiang's grasp to grab Qingxia while the Heavenly Army and General Li Jing dealt the final blow and sealed Xiang Xiang once and for all.

Five hundred years later, Six-Eared Monkey accompanied his son and his disciples on the pilgrimage, while Joker and Zixia watch on after kissing on the top of the wall, mentioning about Six-Eared wanting to be reunited with Qingxia as quickly as possible. One day in Heaven later (10 years later on Earth), Longevity Monk became a Buddha while his parents stay together as the Wick for the Buddha's Lamp, only for their day interrupted by the Jade Emperor saying that the Sealed Book changed again.

== Cast ==
- Han Geng as Zhi Zun Bao (Joker) and Sun Wukong
- Tiffany Tang as Zixia and Qing Xia
- Wu Jing as Tang Sanzang
- Zhang Chao as Niu Mowang
- Zhang Yao as Niu Xiang Xiang
- Wang Yibo as Hong Hai Er
- Xie Nan as Tieshan Gongzhu
- Karen Mok as Bak Jing-jing
- Gillian Chung as Chun Sanshi Niang (Spider Woman)
- He Jiong as Erlang Shen
- Hu Jing as Guanyin
- Huang Zheng as Yudi
- Chai Ge as Huang Xiaoming
- Corey Yuen as Yue Lao
- Cho Seung-youn as Zhu Bajie
- Zhou Yixuan as Sha Wujing
- Jeffrey Lau as Subhūti

== Film song ==
- Han Geng - one's lifelong love（一生所爱）
- Wu Jing - Only You (Cover of Law Kar-ying's version from the first movie)

== Accolades ==
Awards	Category	Name	Result	Ref.
8th Macau International Movie Festival	Best Actress	Tiffany Tang	Nominated	
8th Macau International Movie Festival	Best Supporting Actress	Karen Mok	Nominated	
8th Macau International Movie Festival	Best Screenplay	Jeffrey Lau	Nominated	
23rd Hong Kong Film Critics Association Awards	Best Screenplay	Jeffrey Lau|style="background: #FFE3E3; color: black; vertical-align: middle; text-align: center; " class="no table-no2 notheme"|Nominated		
8th Golden Broom Award	Most Disappointing Director	Jeffrey Lau|style="background: #9EFF9E; color: #000; vertical-align: middle; text-align: center; " class="yes table-yes2 notheme"|Won		
8th Golden Broom Award	Most Disappointing Film	A Chinese Odyssey Part Three	Nominated	
Chinese American Film Festival 2016	Golden Angel Film Awards	A Chinese Odyssey Part Three	Won	

== Box office ==
A Chinese Odyssey Part Three was released in China amidst the Mid-Autumn Festival from which it benefitted. The film opened Wednesday, September 14 and delivered $6.26 million on its first day. It climbed higher to $13.1 million on Thursday (due largely because the festival fell on this day) and held to $9.61 million on Friday (since Friday was also a holiday), before dropping to $5.71 million on Saturday and finally $2.67 million on Sunday (since work resumed on Sunday). In total, the film made $33.3 million in five days according to data from Ent Group and $17.3 over the three days of the weekend (Friday to Sunday), according to ComScore easily topping the Chinese box office and recorded an opening nearly double the second place Z Storm 2 if going by the five-day figure. If we go by the former five-day figure, that means it was the top international earner of the weekend, but going by the latter number, it ranks in third place, behind Bridget Jones's Baby and The Age of Shadows.

Following a first-place finish, the film went on to hold the top position for the second weekend in a row but fell precipitously by earning just $5.97 million (Friday to Sunday) and $13.3 million in its second full week (Monday to Sunday). This was despite competition from newcomer Hollywood animated film Storks. The huge fall was due to mixed word of mouth and since the week before National Day (prior to October 1) is typically a dumping ground for releasing films in which distributors have little confidence in their films' box office potential.
