= Tu Men =

Evenks actor who appeared in various Chinese television series (1960–2021)

- Born: February 1960; Hailar, Inner Mongolia, China
- Died: 12 December 2021 (aged 61); Hulunbuir, Inner Mongolia, China
- Other name: Tumen
- Education: Shanghai Theatre Academy
- Occupation: Actor
- Years active: 1985–2021

Chinese name
- Simplified Chinese: 涂们
- Traditional Chinese: 涂們
Transcriptions
Standard Mandarin
- Hanyu Pinyin: Tú Men

Tu Men (February 1960 – 12 December 2021) was a Chinese actor of Evenks ethnicity.

== Career ==
Tu is known for his portrayals of Genghis Khan in films such as Genghis Khan and An End to Killing. In 2018 he was at the center of a political dispute after referring to Taiwan as "Taiwan, China" drawing a rebuke from the leader of the Taiwan authorities. He died of esophageal cancer on 12 December 2021, at the age of 61.

== Selected filmography ==
=== Film ===
Year	English title	Original title	Role	Notes
1988	To Die like a Man	欢乐英雄		
1988	The Dead and the Living	阴阳界		
1994	Sparkling Fox	火狐		
1994	Jiruo and his Deer	金秋鹿鸣		
1995	The Sorrow of Brook Steppe	悲情布鲁克		
1998	Genghis Khan	一代天骄成吉思汗	Genghis Khan	
1999	Lover's Grief over the Yellow River	黄河绝恋		
2002	Gada Meilin	嘎达梅林		
2002	Heavenly Grassland	天上草原		
2009	By the Will of Genghis Khan	—N/a		
2013	An End to Killing	止杀令	Genghis Khan	
2015	A Simple Goodbye	告别		
2017	Old Beast	老兽	Lao Yang	
2018	Genghis Khan	战神纪	Jamukha's father	

=== Television series ===
Year	English title	Original title	Role	Notes
2001	Laughing in the Wind	笑傲江湖	Zuo Lengshan	
2006	Founding Emperor of Ming Dynasty	朱元璋	Toqto'a	
2007	Carol of Zhenguan	贞观长歌	Jieli Khan	
2008	Paladins in Troubled Times	大唐游侠传	An Lushan	
2008	Royal Tramp	鹿鼎记	Wu Sangui	
2009	Bing Sheng	兵圣	King Helü of Wu	
2009	The Heaven Sword and Dragon Saber	倚天屠龙记	Chaghan Temür	
2011	The Han Triumph	大风歌	Modu Chanyu	

== Awards and nominations ==
Year	Award	Category	Nominated work	Result
1996	Golden Rooster Awards	Best Supporting Actor	The Sorrow of Brook Steppe	Nominated
1999	Golden Phoenix Awards	Society Award	Genghis Khan	Won
2017	First Youth Film Festival	Best Performer	Old Beast	Won
2017	54th Golden Horse Awards	Best Leading Actor	Old Beast	Won
2017	31st Golden Rooster Awards	Best Actor	A Simple Goodbye	Nominated
2018	9th China Film Director's Guild Awards	Best Actor	Old Beast	Won
