= Alex Fong (actor) =

Macau-Hong Kong actor (born 1963)

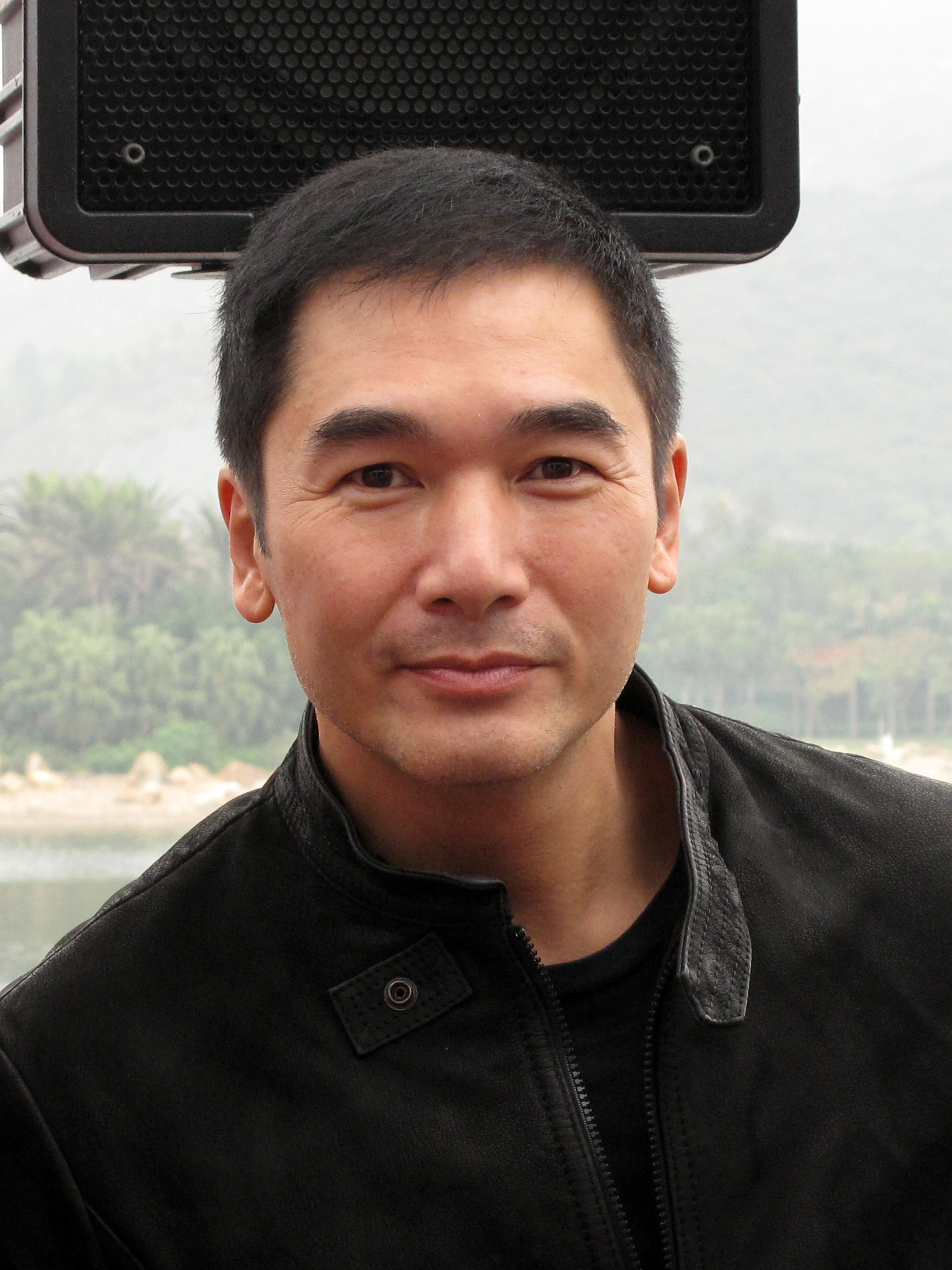
- Fong at the "Take A Step for Green" event
- Born: Fu Lik (符力); 17 March 1963 (age 63); Portuguese Macau
- Occupation: Actor
- Spouse: Hoyan Mok (m. 2008)
- Children: 1

Chinese name
Transcriptions
Standard Mandarin
- Hanyu Pinyin: Fāng Zhōngxìn
Yue: Cantonese
- Yale Romanization: Fōng Jūngseun
- Jyutping: Fong1 Zung1seon3

Alexander Fong Chung-sun (Chinese: 方中信; born 17 March 1963) is a Macau-Hong Kong actor. He married actress Hoyan Mok in 2008; they have one daughter.

== Incidents ==
Fong has been a brand representative of DOXA, a brand of watches since 2008. In the opening ceremony of DOXA's flagship store in Guangzhou, Fong was sexually harassed by another female guest at the event. DOXA issued an open declaration stating Fong's under-performing had harmed the image of the brand, and therefore they terminated the arrangement. Mani Fok, the representative of the artist management that Fong belonged to, explicitly said that the issues involved some requirements which were outside the signed contract as a brand representative.

== Filmography ==
=== Film ===
- 19?? Sea Killer
- 1986 Escape from Coral Cove
- 1987 Iron Angels
- 1987 Life Is A Moment a.k.a. Life Is A Moment Story
- 1988 The Story of Haybo
- 1988 Iron Angels 2
- 1989 What A Small World
- 1989 Iron Angels 3
- 1990 Sleazy Dizzy
- 1990 Blood Stained Tradewinds
- 1990 Fire Phoenix
- 1990 Forsaken Cop
- 1990 The Dragon Fighter
- 1990 Enhanced Romance
- 1990 Magic Amethyst
- 1991 Thunder Run
- 1991 Lethal Panther
- 1991 Gigolo And Whore
- 1991 Pretty Woman
- 1991 The Killer from China
- 1991 Devil Cat
- 1991 Devil And Master
- 1991 The Plot
- 1992 Secret Police
- 1992 Escape from Brothel
- 1992 Behind the Pink Door
- 1992 The Beauty's Evil Roses
- 1992 Battle in Hell
- 1992 Raiders of Loesing Treasure
- 1992 Club Girl's Romance
- 1992 Guys in Ghost's Hand
- 1992 Ghost Killer
- 1992 The Mighty Gambler
- 1992 Gigolo and Whore II
- 1992 Rover Killer And Madame
- 1993 The Invincible Constable
- 1993 Angel of the Road
- 1993 Fatal Seduction
- 1993 Angel of Vengeance (Miao jie shi san mei)
- 1993 Guns of Dragon
- 1994 Love Sick
- 1994 He And She
- 1994 Love Recipe
- 1994 Beyond the Copline
- 1994 Blaze of Love
- 1995 Heart Stealer
- 1995 Dream Killer
- 1995 Hard Touching
- 1996 A Moment of Romance 3
- 1997 Lifeline
- 1997 Downtown Torpedoes
- 1997 We're No Bad Guys
- 1998 Cheap Killers
- 1998 Till Death Do Us Part
- 1998 Raped by an Angel 3: Sexual Fantasy of The Chief Executive
- 1998 Your Place or Mine!
- 1998 A True Mob Story
- 1998 Portland Street Blues
- 1998 Casino
- 1998 The Storm Riders
- 1999 Rules of the Game
- 1999 Red Rain
- 2000 When I Fall in Love...With Both
- 2000 Double Tap
- 2000 Eternal Love
- 2001 The Cheaters
- 2001 City of Desire
- 2001 Sharp Guns
- 2002 Devil Touch
- 2003 The Death Curse
- 2003 My Lucky Star
- 2004 Explosive City
- 2004 Cop Unbowed
- 2004 One Nite in Mongkok
- 2004 Astonishing
- 2005 Crazy'n the City
- 2005 Mob Sister
- 2005 Drink-Drank-Drunk
- 2005 Home Sweet Home
- 2006 Don't Open Your Eyes
- 2006 Heavenly Mission
- 2007 Big Movie
- 2007 Dreams Link
- 2008 Esquire Runway
- 2008 All About Women
- 2008 If You Are the One
- 2009 Overheard
- 2010 Blue Cornflower
- 2010 Just Another Pandora's Box
- 2010 Once a Gangster
- 2010 Triple Tap
- 2010 To Love or Not
- 2010 Love Is the Last Word
- 2011 Be a Mother
- 2011 The Lost Bladesman
- 2011 The Founding of a Party
- 2011 Overheard 2
- 2012 The Great Magician
- 2013 Timeless Love
- 2013 Mark of Youth
- 2013 Love in Langzhong
- 2014 Overheard 3
- 2014 One Step Away
- 2014 Kung Fu Jungle
- 2015 Insanity
- 2015 Paris Holiday
- 2015 I Am Somebody
- 2016 Perfect Imperfection
- 2018 Project Gutenberg
- 2018 Source of Dreams
- 2018 Kung Fu Monster
- 2019 Integrity
- 2019 First Class Charge
- 2019 Dirty on Duty
- 2023 One More Chance
- 2023 The Goldfinger

=== Television ===
- 1992 Crime Fighters
- 1993 Eternity
- 1994 The Intangible Truth
- 1995 Corruption Doesn't Pay (with Esther Kwan)
- 1995 ICAC Investigators
- 1996 Before Dawn
- 1996 A Woman's Story
- 1997 Interpol
- 1998 The Business
- 1999 Wind Cloud Changes
- 1999 Love Is in the Air
- 2000 Showbiz Tycoon
- 2001 Money Game
- 2002 Just in Time for the Wedding
- 2002 Burning Flame II
- 2003 Love and Again
- 2003 Life Begins at Forty
- 2003 Crime Fighters
- 2004 Crime Investigators 2004
- 2004 Split Second
- 2005 Endless Love
- 2005 Legend of Hero
- 2005 Phoenix from the Ashes
- 2006 Fox Volant of the Snowy Mountain
- 2006 Love's New Breath
- 2006 Dreams Link
- 2006 C'est La Vie, Mon Chéri
- 2007 The Building Blocks of Life
- 2009 The Last Night of Madam Chin
- 2011 A Great Way to Care
- 2013 A Great Way to Care II
- 2015 The Legend of Mi Yue
- 2016 Law dis-Order
- 2018 Siege in Fog
- 2019 Begonia Rouge
- 2019 Police Tatical Unit

=== Television ===
- 1992 Passions Across Two Time Life
- 1993 Can't Stop Loving You ("Ai dao jin tou")
- 1994 A Story of Two Drifters
- 1995 Last Dance
- 2002 The Healing Spirit

=== Music video appearances ===
- 1994 Charlie Yeung's "猶豫不決"
- 2004 Kelly Chen's "前所未見"

== Awards and nominations ==
Year	Award	Category	Nominated work	Result
1999	18th Hong Kong Film Awards	Best Supporting Actor	Your Place or Mine!	Nominated
1999	35th Golden Horse Awards	Best Supporting Actor	Your Place or Mine!	Nominated
2001	3rd Taipei Film Festival	Best Actor	Red Rain	Won
2003	6th TVB Anniversary Awards	My Favourite Television Character	Burning Flame II	Won
2005	24th Hong Kong Film Awards	Best Actor	One Nite in Mongkok	Nominated
2005	5th Chinese Media Awards	Best Actor	One Nite in Mongkok	Won
2006	25th Hong Kong Film Awards	Best Supporting Actor	Drink Drank Drunk	Nominated
2006	42nd Golden Horse Awards	Best Supporting Actor	Drink Drank Drunk	Nominated
2007	11th Shanghai International Film Festival	Best Actor	Esquire	Nominated
2010	29th Hong Kong Film Awards	Best Supporting Actor	Overheard	Nominated
2015	34th Hong Kong Film Awards	Best Supporting Actor	Overheard 3	Nominated
