= Be a Mother =

- Directed by: Yu Zhong
- Screenplay by: Wang Haiping
- Starring: Alex Fong; Wang Pei; Qin Lan; Wu Ma; Sun Guitian
- Cinematography: Peter Ngor
- Music by: Liu Sijun
- Release dates: September 2011 (London); July 17, 2012 (China)
- Running time: 91 minutes
- Country: China
- Language: Mandarin

Be a Mother (Chinese: 母語) is a 2011 Chinese drama film directed by Yu Zhong.

== Cast ==
- Alex Fong as Zhang Qing
- Wang Pei as Fang Yun
- Qin Lan as Li Yan
- Wu Ma
- Sun Guitian
- Zhou Xiaoou
