= Kung Fu Jungle =

2014 Hong Kong-Chinese film by Teddy Chan

- Film poster
- Traditional Chinese: 一個人的武林
- Simplified Chinese: 一个人的武林
- Hanyu Pinyin: Yī Gè Rén De Wǔ Lín
- Jyutping: Yat1 Go3 Yan4 Dik1 Mou5 Lam4
- Directed by: Teddy Chan
- Written by: Lau Ho-leung; Mak Tin-shu
- Story by: Teddy Chan; Lau Ho-leung
- Produced by: Catherine Hun; Alex Dong; Song Ning
- Starring: Donnie Yen; Wang Baoqiang; Charlie Yeung; Michelle Bai
- Cinematography: Horace Wong
- Edited by: Cheung Ka-fai; Derek Hui
- Music by: Peter Kam
- Production companies: Emperor Motion Pictures; Sun Entertainment Culture; Beijing Silver Moon Productions; Heart & Soul Production
- Distributed by: Emperor Motion Pictures
- Release dates: 12 October 2014 (BFI London Film Festival); 30 October 2014 (Hong Kong); 31 October 2014 (China)
- Running time: 100 minutes
- Countries: Hong Kong; China
- Languages: Cantonese; Mandarin
- Budget: HK$200 million (US$25,800,000)
- Box office: US$23,295,638

Kung Fu Jungle, also known as Kung Fu Killer and Last of the Best, is a 2014 action thriller film directed by Teddy Chan, starring Donnie Yen, Wang Baoqiang, Charlie Yeung, and Michelle Bai. A Hong Kong-Chinese co-production, the film premiered at the 58th BFI London Film Festival on 12 October 2014 and was later released theatrically on 30 October 2014 in Hong Kong and 31 October 2014 in China.

It was released as Kung Fu Killer in the United Kingdom and United States. Being a critical success, it won the Hong Kong Film Award for Best Action Choreography, representing the fourth time Yen has won this coveted award.

== Plot ==
Hahou Mo is a martial arts expert and police self-defense instructor, who is incarcerated for involuntary manslaughter during a fight with an opponent. Three years later, Fung Yu-Sau is a martial artist who challenges retired martial arts master Mak Wing-Yan in a fight and soon kills him. Hahou learns about Wing-Yan's death and tells Inspector Luk Yuen-Sum that he offers to aid her in capturing the killer with his martial arts skills in exchange for his freedom. After agreeing his terms, Luk temporarily releases Hahou.

Hahou and Luk deduces that another two masters Tam King-yiu and Wong-Chit will killed by Yu-Sau, which is proven correct. After reuniting with his wife Sinn Ying, Hahou, along with Luk soon learns about Yu-sau's identity. They also finds that Yu-Sau is actually obsessed of defeating great martial artists in order to become a martial arts master and also forget his wife's death. Thinking that Yu-sau's next target is Chan Pak-Kwong, Hahou, Luk and his team spies on Pak-Kwong at his restaurant, but later finds that Yu-sau's target is actually Pak-Kwong's student and actor Hung Yip.

Hahou, Sinn, Luk and his team learns about Yu-sau's location and waits for him to arrive. It is revealed that Yu-sau's target is actually Sinn where Hahou prevents him from killing Sinn. Yu-sau escapes again, but Hahou tracks him at the highway and the two intensively battle each other. After the fight, Yu-sau gets shot by Luk while Hahou is taken to the hospital. In the aftermath, Hahou gets permanently released from prison, where he is later appointed again as the police self-defense instructor and also forms his own martial arts school.

== Cast ==
- Donnie Yen as Hahou Mo
- Wang Baoqiang as Fung Yu-Sau
- Charlie Yeung as Luk Yuen-Sum
- Michelle Bai as Sinn Ying
- Alex Fong as Chief Inspector Lam
- Louis Fan as Hung Yip
- Xing Yu as Tam King-Yiu
- David Chiang as Master Chan Pak-Kwong
- Yu Kang as Wong Chit
- Christie Chen as Shum Suet
- Deep Ng as Tai Yue
- Ji Huanbo as Big Guy
- Jessica Wong as Siu Man
- German Cheung as Fai

=== Guest appearances ===
- Steve Chan as Duty Officer A
- Wong Wai-fai as Duty Officer B
- Bey Logan as K1 Kickboxer
- Teddy Chan as T.S.T. District Officer
- Chow Suk-wai as Identification Bureau Officer
- Andrew Lau as Y.M.T. District Officer
- Peter Kam as Superintendent
- Kirk Wong as Inmate
- Sharon Yeung as Landlady
- Mang Hoi as Hunan Gangs Leader
- Alex Cheung as News Announcer
- Tony Leung Siu-hung as Correctional Officer A
- Lee Tat-chiu as Correctional Officer B
- Cheang Pou-soi as Prison Governor
- Yuen Cheung-yan as Lui Ching-yuen
- Raymond Chow as Food Stalls Diners
- Joe Cheung as Film Director
- Dion Lam as Coroner
- Kinson Tsang as Deputy Commissioner OPS
- Susan Chan as Reporter A
- Roy Szeto as Reporter B
- Derek Kwok as Chan Sir
- Yuen Bun as Siu Hok-nin
- Bruce Law as Truck Driver
- Billy Chan as Inmate
- Yan Hua as Correctional Officer C

== Release ==
The first teaser trailer was released on 20 July 2014. The final trailer was released on 4 September 2014, displaying its Hong Kong release date on 30 October 2014.

== Reception ==
On Rotten Tomatoes, the film has a 74% score based on 23 reviews, with an average rating of 6.6/10.

== See also ==
- List of martial arts films
