= Amazing (film) =

- Film poster
- Directed by: Sherwood Hu
- Written by: Sherwood Hu; Tsang Kan-Cheong; Li Haishu
- Produced by: Wang Liqun
- Starring: Huang Xiaoming; Amber Kuo; Kim Ah-joong; Carmelo Anthony; Scottie Pippen; Dwight Howard
- Cinematography: Anthony Pun; Hou Yong
- Edited by: Cheng Xiaohong
- Music by: Frank Fitzpatrick
- Production company: Shanghai Film Group Corporation
- Release date: 30 September 2013 (China)
- Running time: 110 minutes
- Countries: China; United States
- Languages: Mandarin; English
- Budget: US$10,000,000
- Box office: US$6,990,000

Amazing is a 2013 Chinese sports action drama film directed by Sherwood Hu. The film stars Huang Xiaoming, Amber Kuo, Kim Ah-joong and NBA players Carmelo Anthony, Scottie Pippen and Dwight Howard.

It premiered at the Shanghai International Film Festival in June 2013 and was released in China on 30 September 2013.

== Plot ==
Set in modern-day Shanghai, various unexpected events unfold when China's top programmer (Huang Xiao Ming) designs the world's first thought-controlled virtual reality basketball game, and finds himself at risk with the law. The film is also about the passion of sports, love and inspiration.

== Cast ==
- Huang Xiaoming as Bing Shan
- Amber Kuo as Venus
- Carmelo Anthony as himself
- Scottie Pippen as himself
- Dwight Howard as himself
- Eric Mabius as Frank Miller
- Kim Ah-joong as Eileen
- Huang Yi as a cheerleader
- Stephen Fung as Pepper
- Blackie Chen as Blackie
- Li Qin as Xiao Ke
- Yi Jianlian as himself
- Wang Zhizhi as himself

== Production ==
Shanghai Film Group approached the NBA with the idea for a film centered on basketball and video games. The production company sent director Sherwood Hu to New York to make the sales pitch. NBA officials were enthused about the idea and arranged for Anthony, Howard and Pippen to participate. Filming began in fall of 2010 in Shanghai with the scenes with the NBA players, who were available only for a few days each because of training schedules. production was halted for half a year while Hu polished the script and waited for some of his other actors to finish other films. Shooting resumed the following spring and wrapped in October 2011. Language was a key issue during the production because of the cast that included actors from the United States, China, South Korea, Taiwan and Hong Kong.

== Music ==
Amazing features musical performances by the China National Symphony Orchestra and lead soprano Ying Huang. The original score was composed by Frank Fitzpatrick.
