= To the Fore =

2015 Hong Kong-Chinese film by Dante Lam

- Theatrical poster
- Directed by: Dante Lam
- Written by: Dante Lam; Silver Hau
- Produced by: Candy Leung
- Starring: Eddie Peng; Shawn Dou; Choi Siwon; Wang Luodan
- Cinematography: Pakie Chan
- Edited by: Chan Ki-Hop; Curran Pang; Poon Hung
- Music by: Henry Lai
- Production company: Emperor Motion Pictures
- Release date: 6 August 2015 (Hong Kong)
- Running time: 125 minutes
- Countries: Hong Kong; China
- Language: Mandarin
- Box office: US$23.21 million (China domestic gross only)

To the Fore (traditional Chinese: 破風; simplified Chinese: 破风) is a 2015 sports drama film directed by Dante Lam. The film is a Hong Kong-Chinese co-production, primarily filmed in Taiwan with additional shootings in China, Korea, Mongolia and Switzerland. It stars Eddie Peng, Shawn Dou, Choi Siwon and Wang Luodan. The film was released on 6 August 2015 in Hong Kong and Singapore, and 7 August 2015 in Taiwan, China and the United States. The film was selected as the Hong Kong entry for the Best Foreign Language Film at the 88th Academy Awards but it was neither shortlisted nor nominated.

== Plot ==
The story is about Jiu Ming (Eddie Peng) and Qiu Tian (Shawn Dou), who have recently joined a Taiwan Category III cycling team called Radiant. They compete in domestic and international continental road races. After some time, the team breaks up due to insufficient funds. Jiu Ming and Qiu Tian moves on to different teams in their effort to be an Ace.

Jiu Ming starts finding instant success as a Ace, finding himself constantly fighting for the top spot with former teammate and Radiant's Former Ace Ji-Won (Choi Si-Won). Qiu Tian on the other hand, now finds himself no where near the two and eventually starts finding himself drifting further away before he starts resorting to performance enhancers. In the mean time, Jiu Ming and Huang Shi Yao, a fellow professional Track Cyclist start dating. Qiu Tian eventually collapses after overdosing on EPO for another win and is sent to the hospital, finally falling off the grid.

Jiu Ming and Shi-yao's relationship starts to suffer due to separation and Jiu Ming's affair with a model he met during a photoshoot finally breaks them apart. Jiu Ming also suffers a loss to Ji-Won after he was sabotage by his teammate at an important race, who was paid off by Ji-won's manager to ensure Ji-won's win.

Jiu Ming gets into a fight with his teammate after the race and is eventually suspended. Ji-won finds out that his manager had sabotage the race and terminates him immediately. Jiu Ming, finally has time for himself and tries to win Shi-yao back, rushing back in time to watch her race. Shi-yao was in a great position for a win when an on-track accident at the last second causes her severe injuries. She manages to get back on her bicycle and gets the win but not without a huge cost. Shi-yao passes out from blood loss and blacks out just as Jiu Ming gets to her.

At the hospital, doctors let Shi-yao know that it was a career-ending injury. She may never compete professionally again. Jiu Ming hears the diagnosis and offers his Achillies Tendon as a transplant without Shi-yao's knowledge, potentially hampering his own competitive career. Shi-yao depress and unwilling to recuperate finally see Jiu Ming in physiotherapy and realizes what has happened. Rushing over to him and finally getting herself back together.

Si-won, about to promote to the next year is unable to do it without one final race and win against Jiu Ming, approaches Team Radiant's coach and offers to help him restart the team. With the condition that Jiu Ming and Qiu Tian are part of it. Si-won reveals that he has kept track of Qiu Tian's whereabouts whom is now gambling on track cycling in Japan and incurring heavy debts. Jiu Ming goes to Japan in hopes of helping Qiu Tian and bringing him back. Qiu Tian goes to meet the mob boss in hopes of getting his passport back, the boss reveals that Jiu Ming has already came to see him, he will be released under one condition, he runs a madison race with Jiu Ming.

After multiple points finishes, Jiu Ming and Qiu Tian are within striking distance to win the race with Qiu Tian pulling on the break laps and Jiu Ming's explosive power winning them points. Another last second crash pull Qiu Tian out of the race right before the final break and Jiu Ming is forced to continue pulling position for the team. Qiu Tian manages to get up in time for one final lap now taking over as the eligible rider on the final points lap with one last push from Jiu Ming, takes the points and wins the race and his freedom.

Both come back to see Shi-yao together, Shi-yao now rowing competitively and they both join the new Team Radiant once again as partners. Attending the final race of the season in Abu Dhabi. Multiple drop outs and crashes thins out the peloton due to the weather after a treacherous few hours in middle eastern weather brings a toll as Jiu Ming, breaks away in an effort to bait Ji-won into one final race to decide the winner once and for all. Qiu Tian with instructions to hang back till the final kilometer. As their lead out man fall aside for the final sprint, Jiu Ming reveals he was never the Ace for the rest with him leading out Qiu Tian for the final sprint and Qiu Tian taking his long-awaited win.

After the race, Ji-won and Jiu Ming move on to Tier 1 teams. Jiu Ming meets his idol 2014 UCI World Champion, Rui Costa and joins Lampre Merida, meeting Ji-won once again at the starting line of a World Tour Stage. While Qiu Tian goes into the Alps for High-Altitude training to finally overcome his own shortcomings as cyclist

== Cast ==
- Eddie Peng as Jiu Ming, a young and cocky Sprinter aiming to be the team's Ace
- Shawn Dou as Qiu Tian, a humble and introverted Sprinter, who is also aimming to be the team's Ace but better suited to be a lead-out man.
- Choi Siwon as Ji-Won, Radiant's Ace
- Wang Luodan as Huang Shi Yao, a female professional cyclist that catches the eyes of Jiu Ming and Qiu Tian
- Nana Ou-Yang as Coach's daughter and Team Mechanic
- Andrew Lin as Radiant's Team Principal & Coach
- Carlos Chan

== Reception ==
To the Fore was nominated and won the awards of Outstanding Film at 2016 annual China Huabiao Film Awards, one of the three main film awards in mainland China. It was also nominated for Best Cinematography and Best Film Editing at the Hong Kong Film Awards in 2016; and for Best Editing at the Golden Rooster Awards in 2017.

Reviewer Maggie Lee of Variety wrote that "Pakie Chan's lensing captures peloton formations and breakneck sprints from dynamic angles, while the aerial photography by Tsai Chia-ling highlights Taiwan’s lush, mountainous landscapes."

== Awards and nominations ==
Awards	Category	Nominee	Results	Ref.
31st Golden Rooster Awards	Best Editing		Nominated	

== See also ==
- List of films about bicycles and cycling
- List of submissions to the 88th Academy Awards for Best Foreign Language Film
- List of Hong Kong submissions for the Academy Award for Best Foreign Language Film
