= Sherwood Hu =

Chinese American theatre and film director

- Born: 1967 (age 58–59); Shanghai, China
- Education: University of Hawaii at Manoa; State University of New York
- Occupations: Film director, actor
- Years active: 1992–present
- Agent: Hus Entertainment
- Parent(s): Hu Weimin; Gu Menghua
- Relatives: Hu Xueyang (brother); Hu Xuelian (sister)

Chinese name
- Traditional Chinese: 胡雪樺
- Simplified Chinese: 胡雪桦
Transcriptions
Standard Mandarin
- Hanyu Pinyin: Hū Xuěhuá

Sherwood Xuehua Hu (Chinese: 胡雪桦; born 1967) is a Chinese American theatre director and film director.

== Early life and education ==
Hu was born in Shanghai in 1967, to Hu Weimin (胡伟民; 1932–1989), a theatre director, and Gu Menghua (顾孟华). His sister Hu Xuelian (胡雪莲) is a producer.

== Career ==
Born and raised in Shanghai in a creative and artistic family, Hu relocated to the US, where he earned a master's degree in theater and film production from the State University of New York at Buffalo, and a Ph.D. in directing from the University of Hawaii at Manoa. He also studied under Joseph Papp at New York's Public Theater, and began his professional career directing theatre, including productions of Rashomon, Constant Prince, and The Chairman's Wife. He also acted in the lead role of Song Liling in several productions of David Henry Hwang's M. Butterfly.

Hu created The Legend of Prince Lanling, a lavish stage production set in ancient China; this received an honorable mention from the Kennedy Arts Center. He later adapted this into his first feature film, the epic Warrior Lanling, which was launched at the 1995 Telluride Film Festival, San Sebastian Film Festival, Hawaii International Film Festival and others.

In 1998, Francis Ford Coppola and Wayne Wang were executive producers of his second feature, one of the first co-productions between American and Chinese filmmakers. Lani Loa - The Passage was a Hawaiian ghost story/cop movie/spiritual love story, shot in Shanghai and Hawaii, and starred Angus Macfadyen, Ray Bumatai, and Chris Tashima. Tashima also starred in his next film, On The Roof (2002), a small indie digital video ensemble piece filmed in Pasadena, California.

In 2003, Hu returned to China to direct a 40-episode television series, Purple Jade, for China Central Television, and the 30-episode TV series The War of Peking. He returned to epic costume period film work with Prince of the Himalayas (2007), his own adaptation of Shakespeare's Hamlet, set in ancient Tibet, performed entirely in the Tibetan language. The film received numerous awards including best picture, best director, and best actor at several international film festivals.

Hu also has continued with theatre work, including stage productions of A.R. Gurney's Sylvia; Jean-Paul Sartre's Dirty Hands; a modern ballet, Shakespeare and His Women, for the 8th Shanghai International Arts Festival (2006); and a stage production of Prince of the Himalayas (2007) for the 9th Shanghai International Arts Festival. His production of Mulan, adapted as a shadow puppet show, received rave reviews and theater awards, including the Golden Clown Award of the 5th International Theater Festival in Russia. His theater production Farewell My Concubine was in New York Met Life, sold out completely, and received rave reviews. Recently, he directed a new Beijing opera, New Dragon Inn, which is based on a film of the same name; when the production opened at the Shanghai Grand Theater, it was called "an instant classic". His innovative music production Music of Life was performed at Carnegie Hall in October 2019.

Hu is also a guest professor at the Shanghai Drama Academy, where he supervises and mentors graduate students. He has been honored with the title of "Eastern Scholar" as a distinguished professor. Hu founded the Film and Television School at Shanghai Theater Academy in 2012, and served as its dean and professor supervising graduate students. He established the MIA Center (Media Image Art), contributing his time to study VR/AR technology film mixed with theater, computer arts, digital science, and high-tech engineering. He is also a tenured professor at USC-ICCI, Shanghai Jiaotong University.

Hu has also been a host on the Shanghai TV station Art and Culture channel of its film critique program, Hu on Silver Screen, since 2009. He was also the artistic director of the 2010 World Expo's Shanghai Pavilion. His book Notions of Directing has been published by Chinese Film Press. Hu is an active member of APSA. He received a Golden Rooster Award for Excellent Contribution in Film at the 2017 Tokyo International Film Festival, and was awarded best director at the 51st Houston International Film Festival in 2018.

== Filmography ==
Year	Title	Awards and nominations
1995	Warrior of Lanling	N/A
2006	Prince of the Himalayas	N/A
2013	Amazing	Won Best Film at Macau International Film Festival and Chinese American Film Festival
2016	Lord of Shanghai	Won Best Film and Director at Chinese American Film Festival
2020	Lord of Shanghai II	Nominated for Closing Film at Chinese American Film Festival

== Trivia ==
- Hu is sometimes credited as Sherwood X. Hu.
- He has a sister who is an actress, and a brother who is also a filmmaker.
