= Tik Tok (2016 film) =

- Theatrical release poster
- Chinese: 惊天大逆转
- Directed by: Li Jun
- Written by: Ding Xiaoyang
- Starring: Wallace Chung; Lee Jung-jae; Lang Yueting
- Production companies: China Film Group Corporation; Beijing Hairun Pictures
- Distributed by: China Film Group Corporation (China)
- Release date: July 15, 2016 (China)
- Countries: China; South Korea
- Languages: Mandarin; Korean
- Box office: CN¥14.9 million (China)

Tik Tok is a 2016 Chinese-South Korean action crime film directed by Li Jun and starring Wallace Chung, Lee Jung-jae and Lang Yueting. It was released in China by China Film Group Corporation on July 15, 2016.

== Plot ==
Guo Zhida plans a bomb explosion near a soccer stadium to take away money from a gambling group. Police officer Jiang and psychologist Yang cooperate to stop him and investigate his plan.

== Cast ==
- Wallace Chung ... Guo Zhihua / Guo Zhida
- Lee Jung-jae ... Jiang Chengjun
- Lang Yueting ... Yang Xi
- Chae-yeong Lee ... An Caixi
- Fan Yang ... Li Zhiyu

== Reception ==
The film has grossed CN¥14.9 million at the Chinese box office.
