= Never Said Goodbye (film) =

- Theatrical release poster
- Chinese: 谎言西西里
- Directed by: Lin Yu-Hsien
- Written by: Hu Rongrong
- Produced by: Stanley Kwan
- Starring: Lee Joon-gi; Zhou Dongyu; Ethan Juan
- Cinematography: Kim Young-ho
- Edited by: Wong Mo-hang
- Music by: Jeffrey Cheng; Dou Peng; Europa Huang
- Production companies: Phoenix Legend Films; Beijing Chenming Media; Yingyi Production; Emperor Motion Pictures; Dongyang Jiechengrui Jixiang Entertainment; Shanghai Shangshu Investment; Shaoxing Culture Industry Investment
- Distributed by: Beijing Juhe Yinglian Media; Emperor Motion Pictures; Yingyi Production
- Release date: 9 August 2016
- Running time: 100 minutes
- Countries: China; South Korea
- Language: Mandarin
- Box office: CN¥18.4 million

Never Said Goodbye is a 2016 romance film directed by Lin Yu-Hsien and starring Lee Joon-gi, Zhou Dongyu and Ethan Juan. The film is a Korean-Chinese production. It was released in China on 9 August 2016.

== Plot ==
A heart-breaking romantic tale, which starts with Jun-ho, breaking up with his girlfriend Xiaoyou, since he wants to return to Italy to learn opera, supposedly his childhood dream. The movie starts with a scene in which Jun-ho shows his tickets to all the friends gathered at a party. Xiaoyou tries to persuade him not to go. After a bitter fight, Jun-ho breaks up with her and flies back the same night.

The first half of the movie concentrates on Xiaoyou having to deal with the breakup as she struggles with both emotional and work pressure. She and Jun-ho had been working as interior designers at a firm in Shanghai. They met in the university and eventually fell in love with each other. Jun-ho, a Korean student who was raised by his elder sister in Italy, comes to study and work in Shanghai. After an incident, Jun-ho finds out that he has brain cancer and has only 6 months to live. He finally makes up his mind to break up with Xiaoyou, rather than let her see him die. After 3 months, when Xiaoyou still cannot forget him, he fakes his death in Italy with the help of his elder sister and arranges a funeral, so that Xiao You can finally move on in her life. But things only get worse for Xiao You, as she gets more emotionally attached to him after his death.

Her neighbour, Tian Bo, tries to save her from an accident, creating a friendship. However, Xiaoyou's memories of Jun-ho grow only stronger day by day. His unfinished work at a bar keeps her going. Every night, strangely though, her work seems to be completed by some goodwill stranger. She starts communicating with this stranger through smileys drawn on the wall. While Xiao You don't know the identity of the stranger, it is revealed that the person working on the bar at night is none other than Jun-ho, who, with the help of his ex-employer Mr. Ma, secretly tries to fulfill his promise of "never letting her go". Jun-ho's health condition worsens and he is admitted to the hospital for a major surgery, after which he realizes that he might die anytime soon. At his request for one last time, Jun-ho, in disguise as a bear, makes her smile again, with a hug.

The film ends with Xiaoyou visiting Jun-ho's elder sister in Italy after a year, paying her last respects at his grave and listening to all the daily logs he had made watching her every step and caring for her by staying in an apartment just above hers. Hence, the title "Never Said Goodbye".

== Cast ==
=== Main cast ===
Actors	Roles	Citations
Lee Joon-gi	Jun-ho	
Zhou Dongyu	Xiaoyou	
Ethan Juan	Tian Bo	

=== Supporting cast ===
Actors	Roles	Citation(s)
Rayzha Alimjan	Ruby	
Xing Jiadong	Lao Ma	
Yoo Sun	Soo-jung	
Tang Wang	Yanjing (Spectacle)	
Wang Zizi
Piao Shuo	Da Mao	
Ren Luo-min	Xiaoyou's father	

== Production ==
The movie is filmed in Puglia, Polignano a Mare, Italy and Shanghai, China with many on-location scenes.

This 100 minutes film is co-produced by the following companies:

- Phoenix Legend Films
- Beijing Chenming Media
- Yingyi Production
- Emperor Motion Pictures
- Dongyang Jiechengrui Jixiang Entertainment
- Shanghai Shangshu Investment
- Shaoxing Culture Industry Investment

and distributed by Beijing Juhe Yinglian Media, Emperor Motion Pictures, and Yingyi Production.

== Reception ==
The film has grossed CN¥18.4 million at the Chinese box office.

== Awards and nominations ==
Year	Award	Category	Recipient	Result	Ref.
2016	3rd China Australia International Film Festival	Best Producer	Phoenix Legend Films	Won	
