= Macau International Movie Festival =

Annual Chinese film awards ceremony

Chinese name
- Traditional Chinese: 澳門國際電影節
- Simplified Chinese: 澳门国际电影节
Transcriptions
Standard Mandarin
- Hanyu Pinyin: Àomén Guójì Diànyǐng Jié
Yue: Cantonese
- Jyutping: ou3 mun4*2 gwok3 zai3 din6 jing2 zit3

Portuguese name
- Portuguese: Festival Internacional de Cinema de Macau

The Macau International Movie Festival (Chinese: 澳門國際電影節, Portuguese: Festival Internacional de Cinema de Macau) is an international film festival that takes place in Macau, China. The first festival took place between December 26, 2009 and January 2, 2010. It was organized by mainland Chinese businessman Xu Chao Ping.

The festival awards the Golden Lotus Awards.

It is distinct from the International Film Festival & Awards Macao (IFFAM, 澳門國際影展).

== Festivals ==
- 1st Macau International Movie Festival (2009)
- 2nd Macau International Movie Festival (2010)
- 3rd Macau International Movie Festival (2011)
- 4th Macau International Movie Festival (2012)
- 5th Macau International Movie Festival (2013)
- 6th Macau International Movie Festival (2014)
- 7th Macau International Movie Festival (2015)
- 8th Macau International Movie Festival (2016)
- 9th Macau International Movie Festival (2017)
- 10th Macau International Movie Festival (2018)
- 11th Macau International Movie Festival (2019)
- 12th Macau International Movie Festival (2020)

== See also ==
- List of film festivals in China
