= The Devil Inside Me =

- Film poster
- Traditional Chinese: 奪命心跳
- Simplified Chinese: 夺命心跳
- Hanyu Pinyin: Duó Mìng Xīn Tiào
- Jyutping: Dyut6 Ming6 Sam1 Tiu3
- Directed by: Zhang Qi
- Screenplay by: Zhang Qi; Huang Wei
- Produced by: Meng Luyue
- Starring: Tony Leung; Kelly Lin
- Cinematography: Wang Xuewen
- Edited by: Zhang Jia
- Production companies: Xi'an Qujiang Film Investment; Xi'an Qujiang Culture Production Investment; Unicorn (Beijing) Film & TV Media
- Distributed by: Beijing Enlight Pictures; Xi'an Qujiang Film & TV Investment
- Release date: 2 July 2011
- Running time: 95 minutes
- Country: China
- Language: Mandarin

The Devil Inside Me is a 2011 Chinese horror thriller film directed by Zhang Qi and starring Tony Leung and Kelly Lin.

== Plot ==
Lin Yan (Kelly Lin) is a beautiful woman who has fallen into dire straits as a result of a heart transplant that is gradually turning into another person. Yan believes that all the strange things that she encounters are the result of the heart transplant and that she is becoming the deceased owner of the heart Jiang Beiyan (Anya). Due to memory of the heart, Yan gradually sees different memories of Beiyan and under heavy mental pressure, she develops hallucinations and always feeling that Beiyan is around her. Also because of the memory of the heart, Yan thinks that her face is Beiyan and thinks she sees Beiyan while looking at herself in the mirror and pursues her memories and finds help from Beiyan's boyfriend Ma Benke (Huang Weide). In reality, it is physician Jiang Mu (Tony Leung) who is manipulating everything from behind. Mu knows that he has brain cancer and does not have much time left and uses Yan as his experimental target to verify that his "heart memory" theory is feasible and to extend the life of her lover, Beiyan. Mu gave Benke a heart injected with a large dose of anesthetic and yielded his heart to Benke hoping to revive himself in Benke's body so he can live a happy life with Beiyan.

== Cast ==
- Tony Leung Ka-fai as Jiang Mu
- Kelly Lin as Lin Yan
- Huang Weide as Ma Benke
- Anya Wu as Jiang Beiyan
- Zhang Qi as Officer Fang
- Ying Da
