= Perfect Imperfection (film) =

- Poster
- Chinese: 我是处女座
- Directed by: Chen Bing
- Starring: Ady An; Ahn Jae-hyun
- Production companies: Zhongying Shangyuan (Beijing) International Entertainment Investment; Lexiu (Beijing) Technology; Beijing Shangyuan Zhongtai International Media; Beijing Classic Bright Media
- Distributed by: Huanyu Zongheng Shiji Film Distribution (Beijing); Huaxia Film Distribution; Guangdong Sublime Media; Yuyue Film (Tianjin); Mingri Shijie (Beijing) Pictures
- Release date: 25 November 2016
- Running time: 1:30:00
- Country: China
- Language: Mandarin
- Box office: CN¥4.4 million

Perfect Imperfection is a 2016 Chinese romantic drama film directed by Chen Bing and starring Ady An and Ahn Jae-hyun. It was released in China on 25 November 2016. It won the Golden Angel Award for Film at the 12th Chinese American Film Festival.

== Cast ==
- Ady An as Ye Xiaomeng
- Ahn Jae-hyun as Leng An
- Alex Fong as David
- Song Jiayang
- Wang Shuaishuai as Yaoyao
- Zhang Xun
- Wong Yut Fei as Dai Ding
- Kingdom Yuen
- Ye Yiqian

== Reception ==
The film has grossed CN¥4.4 million at the Chinese box office.
