= That Demon Within =

2014 Hong Kong film by Dante Lam

- Official poster
- Directed by: Dante Lam
- Screenplay by: Jack Ng; Dante Lam
- Story by: Dante Lam
- Produced by: Candy Leung
- Starring: Daniel Wu; Nick Cheung
- Cinematography: Kenny Tse
- Edited by: Patrick Tam
- Music by: Leon Ko
- Production companies: Emperor Motion Pictures; Sil-Metropole Organisation
- Distributed by: Emperor Motion Pictures
- Release dates: 8 February 2014 (Berlin IFF); 18 April 2014 (Hong Kong)
- Running time: 111 mins
- Country: Hong Kong
- Language: Cantonese
- Box office: US$20,425,934

That Demon Within (Mo Ging, traditional Chinese character: 魔警) is a 2014 Hong Kong action psychological thriller film directed by Dante Lam and starring Daniel Wu and Nick Cheung. It premiered at the 64th Berlin International Film Festival in February 2014 and also included on the 16 edition of Far East Film Festival in Udine . The film was released on 18 April 2014.

The movie was presented by Dante Lam at the 16th Far East Film Festival 2014 in Udine, Italy with Lam's Unbeatable (2013).

== Plot ==
Reclusive cop Dave Wong (Daniel Wu) unwittingly saves the life of criminal gang leader Hon Kong (Nick Cheung) by donating his blood to him. The gang members hide their faces behind traditional demon masks when committing their violent crimes. During psychotic episodes, Dave experiences his own demons within as he sets out to play off the gang members against each other, resulting in everyone's annihilation. It is then revealed that Dave was brought up by a high expressed emotion father in a socio-economically disadvantaged living environment. He witnessed his father's death inadvertently caused by the responsible policeman who resembled Hon Kong. As a young, innocent soul who had lost his father, he impulsively went on to take revenge, resulting in excessive guilt that predisposed the onset of psychosis later in his life. The event whereby he rescued Hon Kong reminded him of his suppressed memories as a child who had done wrong but trying the hardest to make reparation. Before his inevitable death, there was an opportunity for him to resolve his subconscious intrapersonal conflicts which was to have the courage to fix a mistake done.

== Cast ==
- Daniel Wu as Dave Wong
- Nick Cheung as Hon Kong / Riot police officer
- Christie Chen as Liz Kwok
- Andy On as Ben Chan
- Liu Kai-chi as Broker
- Dominic Lam as Inspector Mok (pops.)
- Joseph Lee as Effigy
- Stephen Au as MC
- Chi Kuan-chun as Dave's father
- Ken Wong as Smart Ass
- Deep Ng as Kwong
- Samuel Leung as Rookie
- Lam Tsing as Chanter
- Philip Keung as Station Sergeant
- Astrid Chan as Stephanie
- Alice Fung So-bor as Granny
- Wu Ying-man as Private nurse
