= My War (film) =

- Poster
- Chinese: 我的战争
- Directed by: Oxide Pang
- Screenplay by: Heng Liu
- Produced by: Chen Ran; Yang Hongtao
- Starring: Liu Ye; Wang Luodan; Huang Zhizhong; Tony Yang; Ye Qing; Wang Longhua
- Cinematography: Chan Wai-Nin
- Production companies: China Film Group Corporation; Beijing Yongxu Liangchen Media; Bei Jing Ge Hua Wei Xian Dian Shi Wang Lao Gu Bin; China Movie Channel SARFT; Khorgas Qianyi Zhicheng Media; Jiangsu Zhongnan Film; Beijing Bofang Media
- Distributed by: China Film Group Corporation
- Release date: 15 September 2016
- Running time: 124 minutes
- Country: China
- Language: Mandarin
- Box office: CN¥36.1 million

My War is a 2016 Chinese historical war drama film directed by Oxide Pang and starring Liu Ye, Wang Luodan, Huang Zhizhong, Tony Yang, Ye Qing and Wang Longhua. It was released in China by China Film Group Corporation in 3D, IMAX 3D and China Film Giant Screen. As mentioned in the movie, the film was inspired by Ba Jin's novel "Reunion" ("Tuan Yuan"). An earlier movie "Yingxiong ernu (1937)" was adapted from the same novel.

Set during the Korean War, it follows soldiers of the People's Volunteer Army sent to fight in the Korean Peninsula against military forces from the United Nations Command, where they experienced life and death and established profound revolutionary feelings.

== Plot ==
The film begins when a train carrying weapons arrived in a station. The Art Troupe were grouped according to the blood type when the males aboard the arriving train mocked the women, until one of the women answered the group's Captain on the local dialect. Meanwhile, a town militia tried to steal weapons on the supply train but was caught. When the train leaves, he dodged the MPs and hopped on the train. The train was carrying troops of the People's Volunteer Army (PVA) to intervene in Korean War. As they arrive in Yalu River, the train was ambushed by American airstrikes and a fortified fortress, causing casualties on the new volunteers. Only on the tactics of their commander Sun Beichuan, they secured the fortress. Next, they were commanded to delay the US attack on a mountain pass, they suffered casualties before one of them detonated himself on the tank. But upon seeing another convoy, they retreated and commanded a father-and-son duo to plant and detonate explosives on the mountainside. The rubble ensued buried the convoy. The unit was honored for their effort. The unit was composed of PVA and some members of Art Troupe.

While entering an abandoned base, they looted it, but detonated booby traps, wounding some of them. One of them stumbled upon a mine, and the Captain saved her. As the soldiers escape, the Americans ambushed them, intending to take the women alive, Big Daddy sacrificed himself and Wenjun died. The girls, full of rage, threw grenades upon their enemies, but Captain Meng was wounded. They flee, while Big Daddy detonated grenades upon the chasing Americans. Days later, they were again tasked with taking some hills.

As the bombardment upon the American-occupied hills ends, they charged with human waves, suffered casualties, but after they placed artillery, they repelled the defenders.

== Cast ==
- Liu Ye as Sun Beichuan / Commander Sun
- Wang Luodan as Meng Sanxia / Captain Meng
- Huang Zhizhong as Li Shunliang
- Tony Yang (credited as Yo Yang) as Zhang Luodong / Little Magician
- Ye Qing as Wang Wenjun
- Wang Longhua as Liu Shiwen
- Guo Jinglin as Tian Yizhuo
- Ji Xiaofei as Lao Ziwei
- Huo Yijian as Lao Bangzi
- Fu Hong as Da Wihu
- Wang Qi as Da Fuzi / Big Axe
- Lin Yanlin as Lin Meiyu
- Liu Yingyi as Xiao Cao
- Xu Jiaqi as Xiao Song
- Ding Zenghui as Xiao Shanzi

== Reception ==
The film grossed CN¥36.1 million at the Chinese box office.

The film was not well received in South Korea, and was considered controversial in mainland China, in part due to its promotional material, in which modern South Koreans were perceived as being disrespected. The controversial advertisement depicted a South Korean tour guide in Seoul, depicted as being ignorant of China's involvement in the Korean War, being bombastically lectured by patronizing elderly veterans of the film's depicted events, boasting of their involvement in the invasion of Korea and recommending the tour guide view the film so she might be better "educated" as to what they are taking about. Furthermore, the film was criticized for a lack of prominence of any Korean characters in the film despite its depiction of the Korean War. Prof. Lin Qi of Harbin Normal University criticized the advertisement in the South China Morning Post, asking: “What would you feel if elderly Japanese group tourists come to Nanjing and say that they had visited the city during the Nanjing Massacre holding the Flag of the Rising Sun?” Zhao Hu, a Beijing-based lawyer, was also critical of the positioning of the war, stating: “We can see a nation has been divided into the North and the South, and countless Chinese died while benefiting three generations of family in North Korea. Are we still proud of that?”

== See also ==
- The Founding of an Army
- The Founding of a Republic
- The Founding of a Party
