= The Lost Bladesman =

2011 Hong Kong-Chinese film by Alan Mak and Felix Chong

- Film poster

Chinese name
- Traditional Chinese: 關雲長
- Simplified Chinese: 关云长
Transcriptions
Standard Mandarin
- Hanyu Pinyin: Guān Yún cháng
Yue: Cantonese
- Jyutping: Gwaan1 Wan4 Ceong4
- Directed by: Alan Mak; Felix Chong
- Written by: Alan Mak; Felix Chong
- Produced by: Leung Ting
- Starring: Donnie Yen; Jiang Wen; Sun Li
- Cinematography: Chan Chi-ying
- Edited by: Kong Chi-leung
- Music by: Henry Lai Wan-man
- Production companies: Easternlight Films; Pop Movies; Shanghai Film Group; Anhui Media Industry Group Co., Ltd. Star Union Skykee Film and Media Advertisement Co., Ltd.
- Distributed by: Edko Films; Easternlight Films
- Release date: 28 April 2011
- Running time: 107 minutes
- Country: Hong Kong
- Language: Mandarin
- Box office: $29.5 million

The Lost Bladesman is a 2011 historical war and biopic action film loosely based on the story of Guan Yu crossing five passes and slaying six generals in the 14th-century historical novel Romance of the Three Kingdoms. A Hong Kong-Chinese co-production written and directed by Alan Mak and Felix Chong, the film starred Donnie Yen as Guan Yu, with Yen also serving as the film's action director.

== Plot ==
The film opens with a scene of Cao Cao attending Guan Yu's funeral – Guan's severed head is buried with a wooden statue in place of his body. The scene flashbacks to 20 years before: After Guan Yu had been separated from his sworn brother Liu Bei, he temporarily served Cao Cao while he waited for news of Liu's whereabouts. At the Battle of Baima between Cao Cao and his rival Yuan Shao, Guan Yu slew Yuan's general Yan Liang and lifted the siege on Baima. As a reward, Cao Cao suggested to Emperor Xian to grant Guan Yu a marquis title and promote him to a higher rank.

Liu Bei's family, including his concubine Qilan, were staying in Cao Cao's base together with Guan Yu. Cao Cao showered Guan Yu with precious gifts, hoping that the general will be touched and will decide to remain by his side, but Guan refused to renounce his loyalty to Liu Bei. When Guan Yu received news that Liu Bei had taken shelter under Yuan Shao, he negotiated with Cao Cao to release Liu's family. Cao Cao agreed, but Qilan remained behind with Guan Yu. As Cao Cao was aware that Guan Yu was secretly in love with Qilan, he tricked Guan into consuming food spiked with aphrodisiac, in the hope that Guan would express his feelings to Qilan and rape her when she was immobilised. However, Guan Yu managed to maintain his composure and refrain from dishonouring his sworn brother's concubine. He and Qilan made preparations to leave Cao Cao after he knew Liu Bei's whereabouts from a messenger sent by Liu himself.

Cao Cao's followers strongly opposed their lord's decision to allow Guan Yu to leave as they felt that Guan might become a threat to their lord in the future. Despite this, Cao Cao gave a strict order that no one was to stop Guan Yu. However, along the way, Guan Yu encountered resistance and had to fight his way through the passes. Guan Yu slew Kong Xiu, Han Fu, Meng Tan, Bian Xi, Wang Zhi and Qin Qi, consecutively after they attempted to stop him. It was eventually revealed that it was Emperor Xian, and not Cao Cao, who issued the order to kill Guan Yu. Before reuniting with Liu Bei, Guan Yu agreed to kill Yuan Shao but entered a dilemma on whether to stay or leave in favour of his relationship with Qilan. However, before Qilan left, she pretended that she loved Guan Yu and said that she would ask for Liu Bei's consent for them to marry. Her true intention, however, was actually to stop Guan Yu from helping Cao Cao. Guan Yu refused and was stabbed by Qilan. Emperor Xian's assassins suddenly appear and attack him, killing Qilan in the crossfire. After a final grim exchange of words, Guan Yu turned his back on Cao Cao and the emperor. He headed to reunite with Liu Bei, fighting against his lord's rivals for the next two decades until his death.

The scene then turns back to Guan Yu's funeral. Cao Cao is sad and sheds tears for the loss of his friend. Before the film ends, Cao Cao makes some final remarks on how not he, but others such as Sun Quan, Liu Bei and Zhuge Liang, are responsible for Guan Yu's death. In a post credits scene, Guan Yu is seen wielding his Green Dragon Crescent Blade upright and stroking his long beard.

== Cast ==
- Donnie Yen as Guan Yu, a general who serves Cao Cao briefly before leaving to reunite with Liu Bei.
- Jiang Wen as Cao Cao, a warlord and chancellor of the Han dynasty.
- Alex Fong as Liu Bei, a warlord and Guan Yu's sworn brother.
- Chin Siu-ho as Yan Liang, a general under Yuan Shao who is killed by Guan Yu at the beginning of the film.
- Sun Li as Qilan, Liu Bei's concubine and the love interest of Guan Yu.
- Andy On as Kong Xiu, the general defending Dongling Pass.
- Shao Bing as Zhang Liao, a general under Cao Cao and a close friend of Guan Yu.
- Calvin Li as Qin Qi, the archer who attempts to kill Guan Yu in the forest.
- Wang Po-chieh as Emperor Xian of Han, the nominal ruler of the Han dynasty.
- Wang Xuebing as Wang Zhi, the official in charge of Xingyang.
- Chen Hong as Lady Gan, Liu Bei's first wife.
- Zhao Ke as Lady Mi, Liu Bei's second wife.
- Dong Yong as Xun You, Cao Cao's advisor.
- Nie Yuan as Han Fu, a blacksmith in Luoyang who is an old friend of Guan Yu.
- Heizi as Meng Tan, Han Fu's sworn brother.
- Yu Ailei as Bian Xi, the general defending Yishui Pass.
- Sang Ping as Xu Chu, a general under Cao Cao.
- Zhou Bo as Pujing, a monk who heals Guan Yu.

== Reception ==
The Lost Bladesman received mixed reviews. It holds a 57% "rotten" rating on Rotten Tomatoes based on 7 reviews.

== Production ==
Shooting began in March 2010 and wrapped up on 30 June 2010.

Directors Alan Mak and Felix Chong sought Donnie Yen as they felt that Guan Yu was one of the best martial artist of his time and that Yen fits the bill as top martial artist in current times. Yen rejected the role initially, as he felt that he was unable to play the role well. The directors then offered the role again to Yen, explaining to him that if he took up the offer he would have a chance to show that he is not just another martial arts actor, but also a good actor.

== Music ==
The song played in the end credits is Qianli Zou Danqi (千里走单骑; Riding Alone for a Thousand Li) performed by Tan Jing.

== See also ==
- List of media adaptations of Romance of the Three Kingdoms
