= 2nd Macau International Movie Festival =

2010 Chinese film awards ceremony

The 2nd Macau International Movie Festival ceremony, organized by the Macau Film and Television Media Association and China International Cultural Communication Center, honored the best films of 2010 in the Greater China Region and took place on December 7, 2010, at the Venetian Macao, in Macau.

A Tibetan Love Song won three awards and Wild Strawberries won two awards.

== Winners and nominees ==
Best Picture: Mr. Bedman – Tai Tai-Lung; Wild Strawberries – Chen Bing; Charlie Valentine – Jesse Johnson; You and Me – Hu Yaozhi	Best Director: Chen Bing – Wild Strawberries; Jesse Johnson – Charlie Valentine; Hu Yaozhi – You and Me; Xu Jinglei – Go Lala Go!
Best Actor: Alec Su – A Tibetan Love Song; Eddie Peng – More Than Close; Ying Da – You and Me; Chiu Yen-Hsiang – Mr. Bedman	Best Actress: Renee Yuan – More Than Close; Huang Shengyi – A Singing Fairy; Peggy Tseng – Revenge of the Factory Woman; Ju Wenpei – A Tibetan Love Song; Tarcy Su – You and Me
Best Supporting Actor: Jeff Chang Shin-Che – You and Me; Lee Li-Chun – The Robbers; Wei Zongwan – A Singing Fairy; Huang Bo – Xun Zhao Wei Chen	Best Supporting Actress: Sharon Xie – A Tibetan Love Song; Liu Zi – You and Me; Che Yongli – A Singing Fairy; Karen Joy Morris – Go Lala Go!
Best Writing: Unworldly – Pei Bei; Wild Strawberries – Cui Zi'en & Chen Bing; Happiness Pursuit – Lingzi; More Than Close – Cheng Hsiao-Tse	Best Cinematography: Full Circle – Franz Pagot; Ten-Mile Red Dowry – Dong Daxin; Go Lala Go! – Jian Liwei; Wild Strawberries – Alex Shi
Best Newcomer: Zhou Chuchu – Wild Strawberries; Ariel Aisin-Gioro – A Tibetan Love Song; Qiu Yanxiang – Mr. Bedman; Renee Yuan – More Than Close	Best Documentary: Saint and Sinner – Zhu Quanbin; San Sheng You Xing – Wang Zhicheng; The Roof – Boris Grachevskiy; The Dream Never Sets – Wu Tairen; Boyi – Wang Qingren; Cross And Banner – Jurgen Ellinghaus
