= 4th Macau International Movie Festival =

2012 Chinese film awards ceremony

The 4th Macau International Movie Festival ceremony, presented by the Macau Film and Television Media Association and China International Cultural Communication Center, honored the best films of 2012. The event took place on December 13, 2012, at Macau UA Galaxy Cinemas in Macau.

== Winners and nominees ==
Best Picture: Outbreak Mother – Gao Bo; Happy Hotel – Wang Yuelun; Stand-In – Wan Li; Xiao Xing Tian Xia – Ye Huaijun; Iron Man: Wang Jinxi – Song Jiangbo	Best Director: Ye Huaijun – Xiao Xing Tian Xia; Shi Lei – One Night To Be Star; Wang Yuelun – Happy Hotel; Zheng Zhen – Ever Loving Ocean Of Blues; Gao Bo – Outbreak Mother
Best Actor: Yu Entai – Stand-In; Guo Tao – Million Dollar Crocodil; Zhang Zhizhong – Iron Man: Wang Jinxi; Jiang Wu – Happy Hotel; Feng Lei – Under The Temptation	Best Actress: Barbie Shu – Million Dollar Crocodil; Tai Lihua – My Dream; Huang Shengyi – One Night To Be Star; Ning Jing – Happy Hotel; Chrissie Chau – Cold Pupil
Best Supporting Actor: Na Wei – One Night To Be Star; Alec Su – All For Love; Liu Hua – Under the Temptation; Vitas – One Night To Be Star	Best Supporting Actress: Gigi Leung – Seasons of Life; Carmen Masola – One Night To Be Star; Ju Wenpei – Deng En Ming's Childhood; Siqin Gaowa – Yang Guang's Happy Life
Best Writing: Iron Man: Wang Jinxi – Ma Daishan; When the Meteor Across the Sky – Liu Yihan; Sweet Eighteen – He Wenchao; Shadow Player – Ibrahim Wang	Best Cinematography: None; All For Love – Long Shensong and Chen Youliang; Ever Loving Ocean of Blues – Shang Zhiqiang; Shanshui station – Zhou Wencao
Best Newcomer: None	Best Documentary: Life is Elsewhere –Huang Jiandong
