= 1st Macau International Movie Festival =

2009 Chinese film awards ceremony

The 1st Macau International Movie Festival ceremony, presented by the Macau Film and Television Media Association and China International Cultural Communication Center, honored the best films of 2008 and 2009 and took place on December 28, 2009, at Macau Tower, in Macau.

Lan was the biggest winner, receiving two awards (Best Actor and Best Director).

== Winners and nominees ==
Best Picture: Cannot Live Without You – Leon Dai	Best Director: Jiang Wenli – Lan; Leon Dai – Cannot Live Without You; Zhang Hui – White Mountain; Jann Turner – White Wedding
Best Actor: Zhu Xu – Lan; Akira Chen – Cannot Live Without You; Xia Yu – Amor; Cheng Taishen – Ma Wen's Battle	Best Actress: Mamatha Bhukya – Vanaja; Ariel Aisin-Gioro – Love in Macau; Wu Yue – Former Wife; Jiang Yiyan – Bao Gui's Secret
Best Supporting Actor: Niu Piao – Bao Gui's Secret; Hu Xiaoguang – White Mountain; Ming Dow – Amor; Li Mengnan – Ma Wen's Battle	Best Supporting Actress: Yang Meng – White Mountain; Xu Qing – The Founding of a Republic; Wang Ji – Ma Wen's Battle
Best Writing: Buscando a Miguel – Juan Fischer & Erwin Goggel; White Mountain – Zhang Hui; Invisible Killer – Xie Xiaodong; Seeking Naadam – Zhou Juan & Bao Lide	Best Newcomer: Helen Yao – Amor; Sandrine Pinna – Yangyang; Ju Wenpei – Set Off
Best Documentary: HER story: Jeritan – Cecilia Ho Wing Yin
