= Zhang Guangbei =

Chinese actor (born 1959)

- 张光北
- Born: June 11, 1959 (age 67); Beijing, China
- Education: Beijing Film Academy; Central Academy of Drama
- Occupation: Actor
- Years active: 1986–present
- Agent(s): Beijing BAMC Film and Television Co., Ltd.
- Spouse: Chen Wei
- Children: 1

Chinese name
- Traditional Chinese: 張光北
- Simplified Chinese: 张光北
Transcriptions
Standard Mandarin
- Hanyu Pinyin: Zhāng Guāngb?i

Zhang Guangbei (Chinese: 张光北; born 11 June 1959) is a Chinese actor, best known in television work for portraying Lü Bu in Romance of the Three Kingdoms (1994) and Chu Yunfei in Drawing Sword (2006).

== Early life and education ==
Zhang was born in Beijing, on June 11, 1959, while his ancestral home in Sichuan. He has an elder sister and an elder brother. As a teenager, at the age of 12, he joined the choir of China National Radio. In 1976, the year the Cultural Revolution ended, he conscripted into military service, where he worked at North China Sea Fleet. Zhang returned to Beijing in 1980 and that year he entered Beijing Film Academy and majored in acting. Two years later, he was accepted to the Central Academy of Drama. After graduating in 1986 he was assigned to Beijing Film Studio.

== Acting career ==
Zhang first came to public attention in 1986 when he was a college student, appearing on Xie Jin's Hibiscus Town, a drama film starring Jiang Wen and Liu Xiaoqing. It is based on a novel by the same name written by Gu Hua.

In 1987, Zhang played the role of Prince Gong in Wang Xuexin's film Two Dowagers, for which he received a Best Actor nomination at the 10th Hundred Flowers Awards. In the following year, he earned his second Best Actor nomination for his performance as Cheng Huan in Mutiny.

Zhang appeared in Hu Guang (1988), which earned him a Chinese Academy of Performing Arts Society Award.

In 1992, he portrayed Emperor Meiji in the historical television series Beiyang Fleet.

In 1993, Zhang starred in Siu Hung Cheung's action film The Assassin, opposite Zhang Fengyi, Rosamund Kwan, Max Mok.

Zhang gained national fame for his starring role as Lü Bu in the 1994 historical television series Romance of the Three Kingdoms, adapted from Luo Guanzhong's classical novel of the same title.

In 1996, he played the character King Zhuang of Chu on the television Eastern Zhou Dynasty Various Nations.

Zhang appeared as Zhou Xuan's husband Tang Di in the biographical television series Zhou Xuan, based on the real life of Zhou Xuan, who was one of China's Seven Great Singing Stars in the 1940s.

In 2000, he played the title role in The Sun Comes East, co-starring Wang Ying as Mao Zedong.

In 2001, he joined the main cast of Princess Wencheng as Gar Tongtsen Yulsung, a general of the Tibetan Empire who served as Great Minister during the reign of Songtsen Gampo.

Zhang co-starred with Sun Li and Tong Dawei in the 2002 television series Jade Goddess of Mercy as Bian Xiaojun.

In 2004, he co-starred with Huang Lina and Gui Yalei in Emperor Guangwu of Han as Emperor Guangwu of Han.

Zhang's big break came when Chen Jian and Zhang Qian cast him in Drawing Sword (2006), in which he played the Nationalist army official Chu Yunfei, a role which brought him much publicity.

In 2007, he had a lead role in The Benevolent is Invincible, this was his second time working with Li Youbin after Drawing Sword. That same year, he co-starred with Xiong Naijin, Anya and Wang Yan in the thriller film Letter Box as the amorous man Zheng Chuan.

In 2009, Zhang portrayed Han Xin in the historical television series The Han Triumph, directed by Huang Jianzhong.

Zhang starred in a historical television series called King of Silk (2010) with Jia Yiping and Ma Yili. He was cast as the political commissar in the romance film A Tibetan Love Song, opposite Alec Su, Ju Wenpei, Purba Rgyal, Ariel Aisin-Gioro, and Chen Maolin.

In 2011, he was cast in the comedy film The Kidnappers, playing the father of Wu Zhenlin's character. That same year, he had a minor role in the wuxia television series The Legend of Chu Liuxiang, which starred Ken Chang as Chu Liuxiang.

Zhang made a guest appearance in All for Love (2012), a romantic comedy film directed by Jiang Ping and written by Zhu Ping and Xu Yiwen, starring Ariel Aisin-Gioro, Che Yongli, Alec Su, and Ju Wenpei.

In 2013, he was cast in the war film Chinese Look with Song Chunli, Song Chuyan, Shu Yaoxuan, Zhang Qianru, and Erma Yina.

In 2015, it was reported that Zhang was in talks to appear as Chang Weisi, a major general, in the film adaption of the best-selling book The Three-Body Problem which will be directed by Panpan Zhang.

== Personal life ==
Zhang married actress Chen Wei (陈炜) in October 1989 in Beijing. Their daughter Zhang Sile (张思乐) was born in 1992 and is also an actress.

== Filmography ==
=== Film ===
Year	English title	Chinese title	Role	Notes
1986	Hibiscus Town	芙蓉镇	Li Mangeng	
1987	Probation in the Army	陆军见习官	Xiang Fan	
1987	Little Empreors of China	中国的“小皇帝”		
1987	Two Dowagers	两宫皇太后	Prince Gong	
1988	Bandits and the Black Swan	强盗与黑天鹅	Feng Ziqiao	
1988	Hu Guang	弧光	Liu Kai	
1989	Mutiny	哗变	Cheng Huan	
1989	Woman Gangster in Blue	蓝衫女匪	Dongfang Hongfei	
1990	Iron Soul	铁血金魂	Brother Fang	
1990	Sacred Fire in a Remote Place	天边有一簇圣火	Liu Qingjian	
1991	A Gentleman's Revenge	君子复仇	Li Donghai	
1992	Dedicate All His Life	九死一生		
1993	Widows	血染桃花水	Laoda	
1993	The Assassin	杀人者唐斩	Song Zhong	
1993	Living with You	与你同住	Zhu Yitong	
2007	Letter Box	信箱	Zheng Chuan	
2007	Wu Yunduo	把一切献给党：吴运铎	Wu Yunduo	
2010	A Tibetan Love Song	新康定情歌	Political commissar	
2010	Lover Eternal	巫山梦	Zhang Qingfeng	
2011	The Kidnappers	非常绑匪	Du Du's father	
2012	All for Love	三个未婚妈妈	Guest	
2013	Chinese Look	正骨	Guo Jiansan	
TBA	The Three-Body Problem	三体	Chang Weisi	

=== Television ===
Year	English title	Chinese title	Role	Notes
1991	The Birth of a Statue	一个雕像的诞生	Luo Shiwen	
1992	—N/a	夜欲	Zhao Liqiu	
1992	Beiyang Fleet	北洋水师	Emperor Meiji	
1993	Xiaodunzi	小墩子	Da Ben	
1993	Romance of the Three Kingdoms	三国演义	Lü Bu	
1994	The Boundless Season	季节苍茫	Liu Housheng	
1994	Scenery of the Small Building	小楼风景	Shengzi	
1995	Walking into the Sun	走进阳光	Zheng Zihua	
1996	—N/a	义胆情深	Zhang Yongliang	
1996	Eastern Zhou Dynasty Various Nations	东周列国·春秋篇	King Zhuang of Chu	
1997	Song of Youth	青春之歌	Hu Meng'an	
1998	—N/a	喜鹊东南飞	Wu Gehua	
1999	Zhou Xuan	周璇	Tang Ti	
2000	The Sun Comes East	日出东方	Chiang Kai-shek	
2001	Princess Wencheng	文成公主	Gar Tongtsen Yulsung	
2002	Jade Goddess of Mercy	玉观音	Bian Xiaojun	
2002	Bingtanghulu Crispy Sugar-Coated Fruit	冰糖葫芦	Muzi	
2002	—N/a	心疼女人	Zhang Tao	
2002	Proud Son of Heaven	天骄	Fang Jie	
2004	Akhal-teke Horses	汗血宝马	Master Tao	
2004	Emperor Guangwu of Han	汉光武大帝	Emperor Guangwu of Han	
2005	Drawing Sword	亮剑	Chu Yunfei	
2005	—N/a	马鸣风萧萧	Tie Haitang	
2006	—N/a	虎穴剿匪	Deng Ziqian	
2006	Let's Remarry	我们复婚吧	Li Xuelei	
2007	Xun Huisheng	荀慧生	Yang Xiaolou	
2007	Fog Willow Town	雾柳镇	Tang Jing	
2007	Secret Post in Canton	羊城暗哨	He Cunxi	
2007	Bloody Xiangxi	血色湘西	Suo Yunchao	
2008	The Benevolent is Invincible	仁者无敌	Li Wenbo	
2009	The Han Triumph	大风歌	Han Xin	
2009	—N/a	天地正气	Guest	
2009	Waiting until the Day of Victory	等到胜利那一天	Kuang Bingyi	
2010	King of Silk	经纬天地	Tao Zhu	
2010	Legend of Su San	苏三传奇	Su San's Father	
2010	Eleven Steps	十一级台阶	Li Daqiang	
2010	Suzhou Twelve Women	姑苏十二娘	Chen Shihao	
2010	A Forward Contract	远期的合约	President Liao	
2011	The Wife of Bandit	匪娘	Division commander	
2011	Five Lakes and Four Seas	五湖四海	Minister Zhang	
2011	Jade Goddess of Mercy	新玉观音	Zhong Guoqing	
2011	Legend of the Gunman	枪神传奇	Ren Rujian	
2011	—N/a	代号十三钗	Japanese military official	
2011	The Legend of Chu Liuxiang	楚留香新传	Old man	
2011	—N/a	山里娘们山里汉	Li Song	
2012	Lone Wolf	独狼	Qi Fangliang	
2012	Red Flow	红流	Chen Duxiu	
2012	The Sun Comes Jiangnan	日出江南	Li Hongzhang	
2012	The Wolf Man of the War Song	战歌之猎狼人	Feng Bingchen	
2012	—N/a	碧血江湖儿女		
2013	—N/a	七九河开	Qin Xiangyang	
2013	—N/a	0号刺杀		
2013	Sirius Action	天狼星行动	Chu Tianfei	
2015	Cop Power	特警力量	Xu Yuan	
2016	The Red Flag thrown into West Wind	红旗漫卷西风	Qin Shengda	
TBA	—N/a	问天录之少年钟馗		

== Awards and nominations ==
Year	Nominated work	Award	Category	Result	Ref.
1987	Two Dowagers	10th Hundred Flowers Awards	Best Actor	Nominated	
1988	Mutiny	11th Hundred Flowers Awards	Best Actor	Nominated	
1989	Hu Guang	Chinese Academy of Performing Arts Society Award	—N/a	Won	
1990	Sacred Fire in a Remote Place	Golden Rooster Awards	Golden Rooster Award for Best Actor	Nominated	
