= All for Love (2012 film) =

- Traditional Chinese: 三個未婚媽媽
- Simplified Chinese: 三个未婚妈妈
- Hanyu Pinyin: Sān'gè Weìhūn Māmā
- Directed by: Jiang Ping
- Written by: Zhu Ping; Xu Yiwen
- Produced by: Jin Zhongqiang; Wu Weijian
- Starring: Ariel Aisin-Gioro; Che Yongli; Alec Su; Ju Wenpei
- Cinematography: Long Shensong; Chen Youliang
- Edited by: Zhan Haihong; An Xiaoyu; Li Guangtian
- Music by: Li Ge
- Production companies: SMI CORPORATION; China Broadcasting Art Troupe
- Release date: October 26, 2012
- Running time: 92 minutes
- Country: China
- Language: Mandarin
- Box office: 4.72 million

All for Love is a 2012 Chinese romantic comedy film directed by Jiang Ping and written by Zhu Ping and Xu Yiwen, starring Ariel Aisin-Gioro, Che Yongli, Alec Su, and Ju Wenpei. All For Love was released in China on 26 October 2012.

== Cast ==
- Ariel Aisin-Gioro as Ye Xiaomeng, the urban female white-collar.
- Che Yongli as Mei Ling, Liu Erbiao's lover.
- Alec Su as Gu Donghai, Ye Xiaomeng's boyfriend.
- Ju Wenpei as Dong A Ping, a woman entrepreneur.

=== Guest ===
- Chen Maolin as Ye Xioameng's father.
- Zheng Yuzhi as Ye Xiaomeng's mother.
- Zhang Jiayi as Liu Erbiao.
- Huang Lei as Officer Liu.
- Yang Mi as Xiao Ma.
- Tong Dawei as The taxi driver.
- Huang Yi as Wei Wei.
- Zhu Xijuan as Liu Erbiao's mother.
- Yan Bingyan as Liu Erbiao's wife.
- Siqin Gaowa as Grandmother Wang.
- Zhu Xu
- Wen Zhang
- Lu Chuan
- Purba Rgyal
- Sha Yi
- Yvonne Yung as The head nurse.
- Feng Gong
- Gong Hanlin
- Lu Qi
- Zhang Guangbei
- Jiang Hongbo
- Zhong Xinghuo
- Hu Ke as a Nurse.
- Huang Xiaoli
- Zhang Yishan as Mei Ling's brother
- Wei Jindong

== Production ==
The film began production in April 2012 and finished filming on May 3, 2012.

The film shot the scene in Nantong, Jiangsu, China.

== Released ==
It had its world premiere at the Huabin Opera House (Chinese: 华彬歌剧院) on October 23, 2012, and it was released on October 26, 2012, in China.

The film also screened in the 4th China Image Film Festival and 8th Chinese American Film Festival.

The film was only moderately successful with critics and at the box office.

== Award ==
Award	Category	Name	Outcome	Notes
8th Paris Chinese Film Festival	Best Actress	Che Yongli	Won	
4th Macau International Movie Festival	Best Supporting Actor	Alec Su	Nominated	
