= Golden Lotus Award for Best Supporting Actress =

Annual Chinese film award

Golden Lotus Award for Best Supporting Actress (simplified Chinese: 金莲花奖最佳女配角; traditional Chinese: 金蓮花獎最佳女配角) is the main category of Competition of Golden Lotus Awards. Awarding to supporting actress(es) who have outstanding performance in motion pictures.

== Award winners and nominees ==
=== 2000s ===
==== 2009 (1st) ====
Year	Winner and nominees (English)	Winner and nominees (Chinese)	English title	Original title
2009	Yang Meng	杨萌	White Mountain	《天山雪》
2009	Xu Qing	许晴	The Founding of a Republic	《建国大业》
2009	Wang Ji	王姬	Ma Wen's Battle	《马文的战争》

=== 2010s ===
==== 2010 (2nd) ====
Year	Winner and nominees (English)	Winner and nominees (Chinese)	English title	Original title
2010	Sharon Xie	谢润	A Tibetan Love Song	《康定情歌》
2010	Liu Zi	刘孜	You and Me	《我和你》
2010	Che Yongli	车永莉	A Singing Fairy	《寻找刘三姐》
2010	Karen Joy Morris	莫文蔚	Go Lala Go!	《杜拉拉升职记》

==== 2011 (3rd) ====
Year	Winner and nominees (English)	Winner and nominees (Chinese)	English title	Original title
2011	Irene Wan	温碧霞	Heroes	《英雄·喋血》
2011	Rose Chen	陈嘉桓	The Woman Knight of Mirror Lake	《竞雄女侠·秋瑾》
2011	Ma Yili	马伊琍	Tracks Kong Lingxue	《跟踪孔令学》
2011	Yang Tongshu	杨童舒	The Count of Destiny	《极峰迷情》
2011	Lü Liping	吕丽萍	Traffic Jam	《堵车》

==== 2012 (4th) ====
Year	Winner and nominees (English)	Winner and nominees (Chinese)	English title	Original title
2012	Gigi Leung	梁咏琪	Seasons of Life	《四季人生》
2012	Carmen Masola	卡门·玛索拉	One Night To Be Star	《一夜成名》
2012	Ju Wenpei	居文沛	Deng En Ming's Childhood	《少年邓恩铭》
2012	Siqin Gaowa	斯琴高娃	Yang Guang's Happy Life	《杨光的快乐生活》

==== 2013 (5th) ====
Year	Winner and nominees (English)	Winner and nominees (Chinese)	English title	Original title
2013	Gillian Chung	钟欣桐	Ip Man: The Final Fight	《叶问：终极一战》
2013	Annie Yi	伊能静	The Assassins	《铜雀台》
2013	Irene Wan	温碧霞	Triad	《扎职》
2013	Ady An	安以轩	Saving General Yang	《忠烈杨家将》

==== 2014 (6th) ====
Year	Winner and nominees (English)	Winner and nominees (Chinese)	English title	Original title
2014	Feng Bo	冯波	Black Mirror	《少女灵异日记》
2014	Yu Nan	余男	Beijing Love Story	《北京爱情故事》
2014	Song Ji-hyo	宋孝智	708090	《708090之深圳恋歌》
2014	Ding Jiali	丁嘉丽	Coming Home	《归来》
2014	Michelle Bai	白冰	Kung Fu Jungle	《一个人的武林》

==== 2015 (7th) ====
Year	Winner and nominees (English)	Winner and nominees (Chinese)	English title	Original title
2015	Jessica Hsuan	宣萱	The Kid from the Big Apple	《我来自纽约》
2015	Karena Ng	吴千语	Ip Man 3	《叶问3》
2015	Nana Ou-yang	欧阳娜娜	To the Fore	《破风》
2015	Gigi Leung	梁咏琪	Wong Ka Yan	《王家欣》
2015	Xu Qing	许晴	Mr. Six	《老炮儿》

==== 2016 (8th) ====
Year	Winner and nominees (English)	Winner and nominees (Chinese)	English title	Original title
2016	Ariel Aisin-Gioro	爱新觉罗·启星	When We Were Young	《不朽的时光》
2016	Yan Ni	闫妮	Good Luck, Dad	《让我怎么相信你》
2016	Victoria Song	宋茜	My Best Friend's Wedding	《我最好朋友的婚礼》
2016	Karen Mok	莫文蔚	A Chinese Odyssey Part Three	《大话西游3》
2016	Amber Kuo	郭采洁	Lord of Shanghai	《上海王》
2016	Pan Hong	潘虹	Kill Time	《谋杀似水年华》

==== 2017 (9th) ====
Year	Winner and nominees (English)	Winner and nominees (Chinese)	English title	Original title
2017	Zhao Jing	赵静	I Am A Doctor	《我是医生》
2017	Li Muzi	李木子	Doctor's Mind	《你若安好》
2017	Yan Ni	闫妮	The Wasted Times	《罗曼蒂克消亡史》
2017	Zheng Shuang	郑爽	Wu Kong	《悟空传》
2017	Guan Xiaotong	关晓彤	A Paper Marriage	《一纸婚约》
