= University of Political Science and Law =

University of Political Science and Law may mean:

- China University of Political Science and Law
- East China University of Political Science and Law
- Northwest University of Political Science and Law
- Southwest University of Political Science and Law
