= Golden Lotus Awards (Macau International Movie & Television Festival) =

Annual Chinese film and television awards

Golden Lotus Awards 金蓮花獎/金莲花奖
- Awarded for: Excellence in film and television
- Country: Macau, China
- Presented by: Macau Film and Television Media Association; China International Cultural Communication Center
- First award: 2009
- Website: www.mtm.mo

Golden Rooster Awards
- Traditional Chinese: 金蓮花獎
- Simplified Chinese: 金莲花奖
Transcriptions
Standard Mandarin
- Hanyu Pinyin: Jīnliánhuā Jiǎng

Golden Lotus Awards are awarded at the Macau International Movie Festival and Macau International Television Festival. The awards are given annually and first awarded in 2009. The awards are given out by Macau Film and Television Media Association and China International Cultural Communication Center.

== Awards categories ==
=== Film ===
- Best Picture (最佳影片)
- Best Director (最佳导演)
- Best Writing (最佳编剧)
- Best Actor (最佳男主角)
- Best Actress (最佳女主角)
- Best Supporting Actor (最佳男配角)
- Best Supporting Actress (最佳女配角)
- Best Newcomer (最佳新人)
- Best Cinematography (最佳摄影)
- Best Sound (最佳音乐)
- Best Documentary (最佳纪录片)

=== Television ===
- Outstanding Television Drama (优秀电视剧大奖)
- Best Director (最佳导演)
- Best Writing (最佳编剧)
- Best Actor (最佳男主角)
- Best Actress (最佳女主角)
- Best Supporting Actor (最佳男配角)
- Best Supporting Actress (最佳女配角)
- Best Newcomer (最佳新人)
- Outstanding Web Drama (优秀网络剧大奖)
- Best Producer (最佳电视制片人奖)

== See also ==
- List of Asian television awards
