= 有朋 =

有朋, meaning "have, friend", is an Asian given name.

Notable people with the name include:

- Alec Su (蘇有朋, born 1973), Taiwanese actor, singer, television producer, and film director
- Yamagata Aritomo (山縣 有朋, 1838–1922), Japanese general and Prime Minister of Japan
