= Yongli =

Yongli can refer to:

- Yongli Emperor (1623–1662), personal Zhu Youlang, fourth and last emperor of the Southern Ming dynasty
- Che Yongli (born 1980), Chinese actress
- Liu Yongli (born 1980), Chinese road cyclist
- Wei Yongli (born 1991), Chinese sprinter
