= Michelle Bai =

Chinese actress and singer

Bai Bing
- 白冰
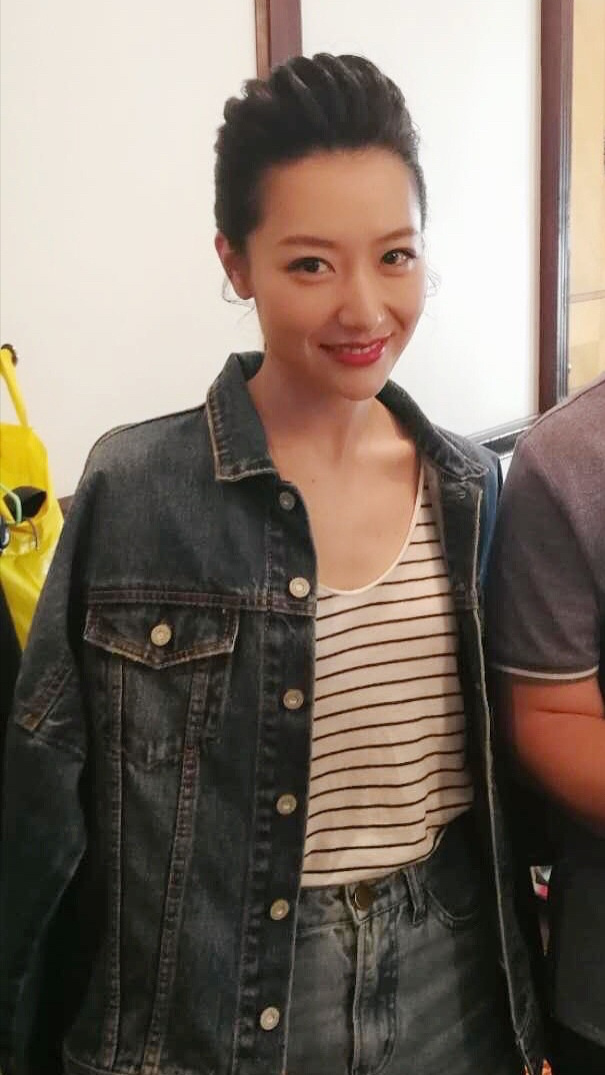
- Bai in 2019
- Born: Chen Dong (陈东); May 2, 1986 (age 40); Xi'an, Shaanxi, China
- Other name: Michelle Bai
- Education: Northwest University of Politics and Law
- Occupations: Actress; singer
- Years active: 2007–present
- Agent: Emperor Entertainment Group
- Spouse: Ding Yi (m. 2013)

Bai Bing (Chinese: 白冰; pinyin: Bái Bīng; born 2 May 1986) is a Chinese actress and singer.

Bai is noted for her roles as Xue Baochai and Princess Yushu in the television series The Dream of Red Mansions (2010) and The Myth (2010) respectively.

== Early life and education ==
Bai was born in a merchant family in Xi'an, Shaanxi on May 2, 1986. Bai was the class commissary in charge of studies when she was a pupil. From 2001 to 2004, she was educated in Xi'an No.1 High school. She entered Northwest University of Politics and Law in 2004, majoring in international law, where she graduated in 2008.

== Acting career ==
On July 26, 2004, Bai signed the Emperor Entertainment Group.

Bai had her first experience in front of the camera in 2007, and she was chosen to act as a supporting actor in the romantic comedy film Call for Love.

She also appeared in various films such as Crossed Lines, Fit Lover, Looking for Jackie, Let the Bullets Fly, The Founding of a Party, Mr. & Mrs. Single, Shaolin, The Viral Factor and CZ12.

Bai gained fame for her starring role as Xue Baochai in The Dream of Red Mansions, adapted from Cao Xueqin's classical novel of the same title.

In 2010, Bai played the role of Princess Yushu in the fantasy epic television series The Myth, for which she won the Huading Award for Favorite Actress.

In 2013, Bai acted in the historical drama Heroes in Sui and Tang Dynasties directed by Chung Siu Hung, playing the role of Xiao Meiniang.

== Personal life ==
On December 10, 2013, Bai married Chinese model Ding Yi (丁一).

== Filmography ==
=== Film ===
Year	English title	Chinese title	Role	Notes/Ref.
2007	Call for Love	爱情呼叫转移	Zhou Xinrui	
2007	Crossed Lines	命运呼叫转移	Ouyang Lili	
2008	Fit Lover	爱情呼叫转移2	Tian Xian	
2009	Looking for Jackie	寻找成龙		Cameo
2010	Let the Bullets Fly	让子弹飞	Daiyu Qingwenzi	
2011	The Founding of a Party	建党伟业	Huang Shuyi	Special appearance
2011	Mr. & Mrs. Single	隐婚男女	Zhang Jingyi	
2011	Shaolin	新少林寺	Tian'er	
2012	The Viral Factor	逆战	Ice	
2012	CZ12	十二生肖	Lily	Special appearance
2014	As the Light Goes Out	救火英雄	Yang Lin	
2014	Kung Fu Killer	一个人的武林	Sinn Ying	
2014	Forget All Remember	N见钟情	Lü Wen	
2016	The Big Lie Bang	谎言大爆炸	Li Qing	
2017	Cook Up a Storm	决战食神	Mei You	
2018	Love Only	宇宙有爱浪漫同游	Song Wei	
2018	Goddesses in the Flames of War	那些女人		
2019	Fagara in Mara	花椒之味		
2020	Love After Love	第一炉香	Mrs. Xin	

=== Television series ===
Year	English title	Chinese title	Role	Notes/Ref.
2007		让梦想走向阳光	Ya Nan	
2007		真情人生	Juanzi	
2009	Happy Endings	完美结局	Chu Hong	
2010	The Dream of Red Mansions	新红楼梦	Xue Baochai	
2010	Bitter Coffee	苦咖啡	Shen Li	
2010	The Myth	神话	Princess Yushu	
2011	Water Guerrilla	水上游击队	Ding Yongmei	
2011	War of Desire	凰图腾	Miu Fengyan	
2012	Palace II	宫锁珠帘	Wan Bin	
2013	Old Days in Shanghai	像火花像蝴蝶	Lu Xiuhe	Special appearance
2013		我要当空姐	Yu Meimei	
2013	Painted Skin - The Resurrection	画皮之真爱无悔	Xiaowei	
2013	Heroes in Sui and Tang Dynasties	隋唐演义	Xiao Meiniang	
2013	Prenuptial Agreement	婚前协议	Chu Zheng	
2015		徽骆驼	Bai Xiaoxiao	
2015	The Four	少年四大名捕	Jiuweihu	
2015	You Are My Sisters	你是我的姐妹	An Jing	
2016	Marshal Peng Dehuai	彭德怀元帅	Qi Xin	Special appearance
2016	Ice Fantasy	幻城	Lian Ji (young)	
2016	Magnificent Sword with Beauty	美人如玉剑如虹	Luo Pu	
2016	The Legend of Flying Daggers	飞刀又见飞刀	Shangguan Xian (young)	Special appearance
2017	Tai-chi Master: The Ultimate Gateway	太极宗师之太极门	Liang Siluo	
2017	Detective Dee	通天狄仁傑	Murong Yun	Special appearance
2017	Legend of Heavenly Tear Phoenix Warriors	天泪传奇之凤凰无双	Gao Yan	
2018	Only Side by Side with You	南方有乔木	Wen Di	
2018	The Evolution of Our Love	爱情进化论	He Xin	
2020	Winter Begonia	鬓边不是海棠红	Jiang Mengping	
2020	Ode to Daughter of Great Tang	大唐女儿行		
2020	Sisters Who Make Waves	乘风破浪的姐姐		Cast member
TBA		无声恋曲	Shen Youyou	

== Discography ==
=== Singles ===
English title	Chinese title	Ref.
"Come and Go Freely"	独来独往	
"Hope"	希望	
"Ocean of Constellation"	星宿海	
"Write Song for You"	写给你的歌	
"I Want to Win"	想赢	
"Beautiful Myth"	美丽的神话	
"The Child"	领养星星的孩子	
"Fallen Leaves"	落叶	
	葬心	
"Wing"	翅膀	
"I Know You Love Me"	我知道你爱我	

== Awards and nominations ==
Year	Nominated work	Award	Result	Ref.
2009	—N/a	2nd Huading Award for Best New Actress	Won	
2010	The Myth	4th Huading Award for Audience's Favorite Actress	Won	
2011	Mr. & Mrs. Single	5th Huading Award for Best New Artist	Won	
2014	Kung Fu Killer	6th Macau International Movie Festival for Best Supporting Actress	Nominated	
