= Golden Lotus Award for Best Actress =

Annual Chinese film award

Golden Lotus Award for Best Actress (simplified Chinese: 金莲花奖最佳女主角; traditional Chinese: 金蓮花獎最佳女主角) is the main category of Competition of Golden Lotus Awards, awarding to leading actress(es) who have outstanding performance in motion pictures.

== Award winners and nominees ==
=== 2000s ===
==== 2009 (1st) ====
Year	Winner and nominees (English)	Winner and nominees (Mandarin)	English title	Original title
2009	Amatha Bhukya	马马泰·布基亚	Vanaja	《瓦纳加》
2009	Ariel Aisin-Gioro	爱新觉罗·启星	Love in Macau	《濠情岁月》
2009	Wu Yue	吴越	Former Wife	《前妻》
2009	Jiang Yiyan	江一燕	Bao Gui's Secret	《宝贵的秘密》

=== 2010s ===
==== 2010 (2nd) ====
Year	Winner and nominees (English)	Winner and nominees (Mandarin)	English title	Original title
2010	Renee Yuan	苑新雨	More Than Close	《近在咫尺》
2010	Huang Shengyi	黄圣依	A Singing Fairy	《寻找刘三姐》
2010	Peggy Zeng	曾佩瑜	Revenge of the Factory Woman	《与爱别离》
2010	Ju Wenpei	居文沛	A Tibetan Love Song	《康定情歌》
2010	Tarcy Su	苏慧伦	You and Me	《我和你》

==== 2011 (3rd) ====
Year	Winner and nominees (English)	Winner and nominees (Mandarin)	English title	Original title
2011	Huang Yi	黄奕	The Woman Knight of Mirror Lake	《镜湖女侠秋瑾》
2011	Sun Li	孙俪	The Lost Bladesman	《关云长》
2011	Kelly Lin	林熙蕾	The Devil Inside Me	《夺命心跳》
2011	Vivian Hsu	徐若瑄	Dancing Without You	《背着你跳舞》
2011	Chie Tanaka	田中千绘	All's Well, Ends Well 2011	《2012来了》

==== 2012 (4th) ====
Year	Winner and nominees (English)	Winner and nominees (Mandarin)	English title	Original title
2012	Barbie Shu	徐熙媛	Million Dollar Crocodile	《百万巨鳄》
2012	Tai Lihua	邰丽华	My Dream	《我的梦》
2012	Huang Shengyi	黄圣依	One Night To Be Star	《一夜成名》
2012	Ning Jing	宁静	Happy Hotel	《乐翻天》
2012	Chrissie Chau	周秀娜	Cold Pupil	《冷瞳》

==== 2013 (5th) ====
Year	Winner and nominees (English)	Winner and nominees (Mandarin)	English title	Original title
2013	Liu Yifei	刘亦菲	The Assassins	《铜雀台》
2013	Joey Yung	容祖儿	Diva	《华丽之后》
2013	Charlene Choi	蔡卓妍	The Midas Touch	《超级经理人》
2013	Xu Fan	徐帆	Saving General Yang	《忠烈杨家将》

==== 2014 (6th) ====
Year	Winner and nominees (English)	Winner and nominees (Mandarin)	English title	Original title
2014	Charlene Choi	蔡卓妍	Sara	《雏妓》
2014	Gong Li	巩俐	Coming Home	《归来》
2014	Gao Yuanyuan	高圆圆	But Always	《一生一世》
2014	Liu Shishi	刘诗诗	Five Minutes to Tomorrow	《深夜前的五分钟》
2014	Tong Liya	佟丽娅	Beijing Love Story	《北京爱情故事》

==== 2015 (7th) ====
Year	Winner and nominees (English)	Winner and nominees (Mandarin)	English title	Original title
2015	Kara Hui	惠英紅	Happiness	《幸運是我》
2015	Ann Hsu	許瑋甯	Dream Flight	《想飛》
2015	Wang Luodan	王珞丹	To the Fore	《破風》
2015	Irene Wan	溫碧霞	Love in Late Autumn	《愛在深秋》
2015	Ariel Aisin-Gioro	愛新覺羅·啟星	See Your Voice	《看見你的聲音》

==== 2016 (8th) ====
Year	Winner and nominees (English)	Winner and nominees (Mandarin)	English title	Original title
2016	Zhou Dongyu	周冬雨	Never Said Goodbye	《谎言西西里》
2016	Angelababy	杨颖	Kill Time	《谋杀似水年华》
2016	Shu Qi	舒淇	My Best Friend's Wedding	《我最好朋友的婚礼》
2016	Tiffany Tang	唐嫣	A Chinese Odyssey Part Three	《大话西游III》
2016	Ady An	安以轩	Perfect Imperfection	《我是处女座》
2016	Wang Luodan	王珞丹	My War	《我的战争》

==== 2017 (9th) ====
Year	Winner and nominees (English)	Winner and nominees (Mandarin)	English title	Original title
2017	Zhang Ziyi	章子怡	The Wasted Times	《罗曼蒂克消亡史》
2017	Jiang Yiyan	江一燕	Seventy-Seven Days	《七十七天》
2017	Zhu Xijuan	祝希娟	A Loner	《大雪冬至》
2017	Liu Yifei	刘亦菲	Once Upon a Time	《三生三世十里桃花》
2017	Ni Ni	倪妮	Wu Kong	《悟空传》

==== 2018 (10th) ====
Year	Winner and nominees (English)	Winner and nominees (Mandarin)	English title	Original title
2018	Zhang Ziyi	章子怡	Forever Young	《无问西东》
2018	Zhou Yun	周韵	Hidden Man	《邪不压正》
2018	Ma Yili	马伊琍	Entering the Forbidden City	《进京城》
2018	Hai Qing	海清	Operation Red Sea	《红海行动》
2018	Ren Suxi	任素汐	A Cool Fish	《无名之辈》

==== 2019 (11th) ====
Year	Winner and nominees (English)	Winner and nominees (Mandarin)	English title	Original title
2019	Charlene Choi	蔡卓妍	The Lady Improper	《 非分熟女》
2019	Ada Liu	柳岩	My Dear Liar	《受益人》
2019	Ma Yili	马伊琍	The Road Not Taken	《未择之路》
2019	Jiao Junyan	焦俊艳	Hunt Down	《长安道》
2019	Ren Suxi	任素汐	Looking Up	《银河补习班》

==== 2020 (12th) ====
Year	Winner and nominees (English)	Winner and nominees (Mandarin)	English title	Original title
2020	Zhong Chuxi	钟楚曦	August Never Ends	《 八月未央》
2020	Zhao Wei	赵薇	Two Tigers	《两只老虎》
2020	Joan Chen	陈冲	Sheep Without a Shepherd	《误杀》
2020	Ma Sichun	马思纯	Wild Grass	《荞麦疯长》
2020	Sammi Cheng	鄭秀文	Fatal Visit	《聖荷西謀殺案》
