= Dai Xianghui =

Chinese politician (born 1966)

- 戴向晖

Deputy Secretary of Ningxia Regional Politics and Law Commission
- In office December 2020 – September 2021
- Secretary: Lai Jiao

Personal details
- Born: March 1966 (age 60) Beijing, China
- Party: Chinese Communist Party
- Education: Northwest University of Politics and Law; Xi'an University of Technology

Chinese name
- Simplified Chinese: 戴向晖
- Traditional Chinese: 戴向暉
Transcriptions
Standard Mandarin
- Hanyu Pinyin: Dài Xiànghuī

Dai Xianghui (Chinese: 戴向晖; born March 1966) is a former Chinese procurator and politician. He was investigated by China's top anti-graft agency in September 2021. Previously he served as deputy secretary of Ningxia Regional Politics and Law Commission.

== Biography ==
Born in Beijing in March 1966, Dai graduated from Northwest University of Politics and Law and Xi'an University of Technology.

He entered the workforce in July 1988, and joined the Chinese Communist Party in June 1993. In July 1988, he began his politic career in northwest China's Ningxia Hui Autonomous Region as an official at the Yinchuan People's Procuratorate. At Yinchuan People's Procuratorate, he eventually became chief procurator in March 2006. He was despatched to Ningxia People's Procuratorate in October 2007. He moved up the ranks to become deputy chief procurator in November 2007 and deputy party branch secretary in March 2012. In December 2020, he was appointed deputy secretary of Ningxia Regional Politics and Law Commission, serving in the post until September 2021.

=== Downfall ===
On 10 September 2021, he was put under investigation for alleged "serious violations of discipline and laws" by the Central Commission for Discipline Inspection (CCDI), the party's internal disciplinary body, and the National Supervisory Commission, the highest anti-corruption agency of China.
