= World Film Report =

- Also known as: 世界电影之旅; Shì Jiè Diàn Yǐng Zhī Lǔ
- Country of origin: China
- Original language: Mandarin

Production
- Production locations: Beijing, China
- Running time: 40 minutes

Original release
- Network: CCTV-6
- Release: 1 January 2002 – present

World Film Report (Chinese: 世界电影之旅; pinyin: Shì Jiè Diàn Yǐng Zhī Lǔ) is a China daily movie news/variety show broadcast on CCTV-6 (Chinese: 中国中央电视台电影频道). It is broadcast two episodes per Sunday from 18:20 to 19:00 and from 21:30 to 22:10. It is first global movie industry television program in mainland China. In 2010, this show honored Media Contribution Award by Republic of Zimbabwe.

== Host ==
- Wang Ningtong
- Ju Wenpei
- Liu Jia

== List of Guests ==
Since its premiere in 2002, the hosts has interviewed entertainers.

=== Mainland China ===
(not complete)

- Zhang Yimou
- Chen Kaige
- Feng Xiaogang
- He Ping
- Gong Li
- Zhao Wei
- Zhang Ziyi
- Zhou Xun
- Xu Jinglei
- Fan Bingbing
- Li Bingbing
- Yan Danchen
- Chen Kun
- Huang Xiaoming
- Jet Li

=== Hong Kong ===
(not complete)

- Maggie Cheung
- Andy Lau
- Carina Lau
- Ng Man Tat
- Eric Tsang
- Nicholas Tse
- Wong Jing
- Cecilia Cheung
- Stephen Chow
- Twins (band)
- Joey Yung
- Lydia Shum
- Vivian Chow
- Fiona Sit
- Ronald Cheng
- Josie Ho
- Anita Yuen
- Wakin Chau
- Joyce Cheng
- Anthony Wong
- John Woo
- Jacky Cheung
- Jaycee Chan
- Timmy Hung
- Jackie Chan

=== Taiwan ===
Li Xing, Hou Hsiao-hsien, Tsai Ming-liang, Ang Lee

=== Overseas ===
Luc Besson, Edward Norton, Yoji Yamada, Kang Je-gyu
