= Wu Kong (film) =

2017 Chinese-Hong Kong fantasy adventure film

- Poster

Chinese name
- Traditional Chinese: 悟空傳
- Simplified Chinese: 悟空传
Transcriptions
- Directed by: Derek Kwok
- Screenplay by: Derek Kwok; Jin Hezai
- Based on: Wukong Biography by Jin Hezai
- Produced by: Huang Jianxin
- Starring: Eddie Peng; Ni Ni; Shawn Yue; Oho Ou; Zheng Shuang; Faye Yu
- Cinematography: Jason Kwan
- Edited by: Matthew Hui
- Music by: Teddy Robin; Wan Pin Chu
- Production company: New Classics Media
- Distributed by: New Classics Media; Aeon Pix Studios (India)
- Release date: 13 July 2017
- Running time: 130 minutes
- Countries: China; Hong Kong
- Language: Mandarin
- Box office: US$104 million

Wu Kong (Chinese: 悟空传; Chinese: 悟空傳), also known as Immortal Demon Slayer and The Legend of Wukong, is a 2017 fantasy-action-adventure film directed by Derek Kwok and produced by Huang Jianxin, starring Eddie Peng, Ni Ni, Shawn Yue, Oho Ou, and Zheng Shuang. A Chinese-Hong Kong co-production, the film is based on Jin Hezai's internet novel Wukong Biography, which retells the story of Sun Wukong (the Monkey King) in the classical novel Journey to the West and is partly inspired by the 1995 comedy film A Chinese Odyssey. It was released in China on 13 July 2017.

== Plot ==
Set 500 years before Sun Wukong wreaks havoc in Heaven, it retells the origin story of Sun Wukong, who refuses to let Heaven's will determine his destiny and sets out to rebel against Heaven. During this time, he meets Ah-zi, Yang Jian, Tianpeng, Juanlian, and others.

== Cast ==
- Eddie Peng as Sun Wukong
- Ni Ni as Ah-zi
  - Li Shang'en as Ah-zi (child)
- Shawn Yue as Yang Jian (Erlang Shen)
- Oho Ou as Tianpeng
- Zheng Shuang as Ah-yue
- Qiao Shan as Juanlian
- Faye Yu as the Lady
- Yang Di as Juling Shen
- Quentin Zhang as White Robe Immortal
- Wang Deshun as Master Bodhi

== Soundtrack ==
- Purples (紫) performed by Tanya Chua composed by Yusuke Hatano
- Sky (空) performed by Terry Lin composed by Wan Pin Chu
- The Monkey King (齐天) by Hua Chenyu

== Release ==
The film was released in China on 13 July 2017 in MX4D, 4DX, IMAX 3D, 3D and China Film Giant Screen.

== Reception ==
The film has grossed CN¥696 million in China.

== Awards and nominations ==
Award	Category	Nominee	Result	Ref.
9th Macau International Movie Festival	Best Actor	Eddie Peng	Nominated	
9th Macau International Movie Festival	Best Actress	Ni Ni	Nominated	
9th Macau International Movie Festival	Best Supporting Actor	Shawn Yue	Nominated	
9th Macau International Movie Festival	Best Supporting Actress	Zheng Shuang	Nominated	
9th Macau International Movie Festival	Best Cinematography	Jason Kwan	Nominated	
37th Hong Kong Film Awards	Best Art Direction	Eric Lam	Nominated	
37th Hong Kong Film Awards	Best Costume Make Up Design	Bruce Yu, Lee Pik-kwan	Nominated	
37th Hong Kong Film Awards	for Best Action Choreography	Ku Huen-chiu	Nominated	
37th Hong Kong Film Awards	Best Sound Design	Hao Gang, Wang Chong	Nominated	
37th Hong Kong Film Awards	Best Visual Effects	Henri Wong, Eric Xu	Won	
23rd Huading Awards	Best Supporting Actress	Faye Yu	Nominated	
23rd Huading Awards	Best Original Film Song	"The Monkey King" (Hua Chenyu)	Nominated	
