= Hsiao-Wen Ting =

Taiwanese singer-songwriter and producer (born 1963)

- 丁曉雯
- Born: October 2, 1963 (age 62)
- Education: Fu Jen Catholic University
- Occupations: Singer-songwriter, producer
- Years active: 1985–present

Hsiao-Wen Ting (Chinese: 丁曉雯; born October 2, 1963) is a singer-songwriter, producer, A&R executive, executive manager, and TV host. Currently, she plays an active role in the Chinese music industry, having entered the industry in 1985.

== Early life ==
Ting's passion for music started at an early age, when she would watch Taiwanese singing variety show Stars Gathering with her family, and sing along while listening to vinyl records with her brother. As a student, Ting wrote poetry for which she often received positive feedback from her teachers. Ting has said that one reason she entered the music industry as a lyricist is due to the writing training she received in her student life, and the inspiration she got from the rise of the folk era in Taiwan.

In the 1980s, Ting enrolled in the Department of Mass Communication at Fu Jen Catholic University, studying advertisements, films, TV broadcast, and photography. She participated in various annual songwriting and performance contests, including "Cyan Rhyme" (輔大青韻獎) and "Da Xue Cheng" (大學城), achieving first and second places. She received a second place in songwriting with "If I Can" (如果能夠). These recognitions and performances all became the stepping stone of Ting's opportunity of participating in the joint record and led Ting to her debut as a singer.

== Career ==
=== Early career ===
After the joint album, Ting was signed as a singer in UFO Records Company by Chu Chu Wu, and released the album After Campus with Kevin Lin. When recording her own album, Ting grew interested in the production of records, and decided to emerge into the production side of the business. She left UFO and joined Rock Records, producing music with Jonathan Lee.

As a producing assistant, Ting accumulated experience with big figures in music production, including "Kiss of Silk" (紗的吻) by Michelle Pan (co-produced by Guang Yuan Shen), A Woman's Heart (女人心) by Sarah Chen in 1988 (co-produced by Jonathan Lee), and "I Am Addicted to You" (上了你癮) by Hsiao Shih Tang. Her first time being the producer herself was in 1988 with Flaming Red Lips (烈焰紅唇) by Anita Mui.

=== Songwriter and producer ===
Ting's production and songwriting career expanded to working with popular artists and collaborating with the music industry in Hong Kong and China. In the 1990s when the Taiwanese music industry was booming, Ting wrote the lyrics for "You Are the Eternal Pain in My Heart" (你是我胸口永遠的痛) by Dave Wong, the theme song for Wong Kar-wai’s movie As Tears Go By (旺角卡門). The song was a great success and brought Ting to fame. She later published numerous hit song lyrics such as "Green Apple Paradise" (青蘋果樂園) by Xiao Hu Dui (The Little Tigers), "Home Again Without You" (愛上一個不回家的人) by Sandy Lam, "Blessing" (祝福) by Jacky Cheung, "Love is Deeper" (愛得比較深) by Sarah Chen, "Years of Youth" (青春夢) by Alan Tam, and "My Love My Dream My Home" (我的愛我的夢我的家) by Fong Fei-fei.

Ting has produced and supervised best-selling albums including Conquer (征服) by Na Ying, In One's Own Room (在自己的房間裡) by Gloria Yip, Infatuated Me (癡心的我) by Samuel Tai, and Worth It (值得) by Sammi Cheng.

=== Stage performance ===
Ting has performed in numerous concert venues in Taiwan, including Taipei Arena, Kaohsiung Arena, Legacy Taipei and Taichung, Taipei International Convention Centre, Sun Yat-sen Memorial Hall, Riverside Live House (Ximen and Gongguan), and Songshan Cultural and Creative Park. She has also performed in Chinese venues Oriental Wende Plaza in Guangzhou and Wuzhou Auditorium One in Beijing. Ting organized a solo concert There's a Song in Everyone's Heart (每個人心中都有一首歌) in 2014, 30 years after her debut. Till this day, the concert recordings are still being replayed by Taiwan Public Television Service.

=== Talent development ===
Ting has worked in music education and developing new talents. She is often invited by institutions and broadcast media as an instructor for classes or workshops, or as a panel judge member for contests. She has taught in universities in Taiwan including National Taiwan Normal University, Fu Jen Catholic University, Shih Hsin University, Chung Yuan Christian University, National Taipei University, Chinese Culture University, and Shih Chien University. She has held workshops and seminars at special events such as Golden Melody Festival (金曲國際音樂節) and Taoyuan Taiwan Iron Rose Music Festival (桃園鐵玫瑰音樂節).

Ting also provided support for the completion of the Ministry of Culture's project "Pop Music Teaching Materials for Primary and Middle Schools" (國小及國高中流行音樂輔助教材), and started classes on lyrics writing and singing at Xuexue. Ting is creditable with discovering and developing the talents of singers Jeff Chang and Fu Kai Hsu and lyricist Yan Yunnong.

=== Public affairs ===
In 1996 Ting entered Warner Chappell Music as creative director to sign exclusive writers and to establish IP and the royalties scheme. Two years later, she gathered hundreds of musicians to sign a petition to revise the Copyright Act from the Copyright Review and Mediation Committee of Ministry of the Interior. In 1999, Ting supported the founding of MÜST, an institution to protect the rights of musicians, and served as the chairman. She was also involved in the founding of Taipei Music Center, and has been supporting the establishment of the database for Taiwanese pop music and the preservation of its history.

=== Other appearances ===
Ting has served as the panel judge for many music competitions for more than 30 years. These include Golden Bell Awards, Golden Melody Awards, I Am a Singer by Hunan Television, Future Superstar by Formosa Television, Kan Jian Yin Yue (看見音樂計畫) by TikTok. Ting still serves as a panel judge for music shows on TV programs regularly.

Ting is often invited as the host for events and broadcast programs. She has hosted concerts including Taipei Broadcasting Station's annual event "Heading to 2018 – Full of Happiness Concert", Taipei Symphony Orchestra's "You're all that my memory is – seamless concert", and Fujen University's "Those Happy Fujen Times – 520 Folk Concert". She has also held seminar workshop events like Da-Yu Lo's "The Story of Music and Movies", Judy Ong's Print and Engraving Paint Gallery Seminar, and other musical events such as the songwriting contest "Da Xue Cheng" (大學城). She is also the host for the radio program "Hsiao-Wen Doesn't Sing Today" (曉雯老師不唱歌).

Ting has also written two books: Our Music Class – Creative Music Influence after 1980 in Taiwan (我們的音樂課----影響台灣80’s後的音樂原創力), published in 2012, and her autobiography There's a Song in Everyone's Heart (每個人心中都有一首歌), which shares the name of her 2014 solo concert. For charity, a thousand copies of Our Music Class – Creative Music Influence after 1980 in Taiwan were distributed for free to schools after its publication.

== Artistry ==
=== Production mindset ===
In her autobiography, Ting has talked about her attitude towards being a producer:

“a producer should uncover the potentials of a singer. Even if you already know his or her greatest strength, you still have to look for those unknown abilities; maybe that’ll be what’s most unique about this singer.”

When producing Na Ying's album Conquering (征服), Ting had been demanding yet constructive when giving feedback. As the album was planned to be released in Taiwan, Ting repeatedly commented on Na Ying's pronunciation and requested for retakes. Na Ying got angry, saying "My pronunciation is more legit than yours!", receiving the reply from Ting: "That's exactly why I don't want you to sound so legit." Other than this little incident in producing the album, Ting wanted Na Ying to emphasize on her mid-range singing, unlike her past performances that are focused on powerful voicings. She purposely incorporated songs that allow Na Ying to perform her mid-range voicing while also demonstrating her high-pitch advantages.

Ting has said that a producer should follow the singer's traits, position them, select the right songs to make sure the style, content, and the singer are in agreement. When producing Sandy Lam's album, Ting did some market research analysis, and deciding that Sandy should take on a first-person approach when singing. This finding later allowed Ting to write "Home Again Without You" (愛上一個不回家的人) as the hit song for the album.

=== Style ===
Ting has said she hopes her lyrics resonate with the listeners and make them touched emotionally and spiritually, and that she is not fond of using embellished writing; instead, she prefers using straightforward and practical word choices to bring out the inner feelings of the listeners.

== Works ==
=== Songwriting ===
Ting has released over 400 songs, notably:

Song	Singer
你是我胸口永遠的痛	Dave Wong, Huan Yeh
青蘋果樂園、週末嘉年華、愛情變化球	The Little Tigers
愛上一個不回家的人、你給我的愛不是愛、哈囉寂寞	Sandy Lam
有情人總被無情傷	Ouyang Fei Fei
祝福、偷心、紅色、最後一封信、如果你懂	Jacky Cheung
殘缺的溫柔	Irene Yeh
愛得比較深、和你一樣、柔弱女子	Sarah Chen
曾經愛過、不變是你永遠是我	Jeff Chang
捨不得你、相逢不恨晚	Sammi Cheng
痴心的我、似夢迷離	Samuel Tai
青春夢	Alan Tam
在自己的房間裡	Gloria Yip
像霧像雨又像風、好聚好散、慢慢地陪著你走	Annie Leung
不管有多苦、你是我的人、放手	Na Ying
我的愛我的夢我的家	Fei-Fei Fong
那又如何	Shino Lin
胭脂扣、烈燄紅唇、心仍是冷	Anita Mui
諾言	E-Jun Lee
燭光	Richie Jen
你是我心內的一首歌	Leehom Wang & Selina Ren

=== Recorded songs ===
Song(s)	Album	Year
"Gao Bai" (告白), "Shen Hua" (神話)	Commemorative Album of the 2nd National Universities Songs Producing Contest	1985
"If I Can" (如果能夠)	Commemorative Album of the 3rd National Universities Songs Producing Contest "Fei Yang De Qing Chun" (飛揚的青春)	1986
"He Wan Zhe Bei Ni Zai Zou" (喝完這杯你再走)	Commemorative Album of 1986 Best New Artist by Asia Records	1986
Full Album	Album Zou Chu Xiao Yuan Yi Hou (走出校園以後) by Hsiao-Wen Ting and Kevin Lin	1987
"Wo Men De Ge" (我們的歌)	Single	2012
"Xin Yue Ying Jiu Meng" (新月映舊夢)	Single	2014

=== Albums produced ===
Ting has produced over 40 albums. Below are a few listed:

Artist	Album
Na Ying	征服
Anita Mui	烈焰紅唇
Annie Leung	像霧像雨又像風
Sammi Cheng	值得
Kathy Chau	日出愛情
Samuel Tai	痴心的我
Ram Chiang	多情多寂寞
Francesca Kao	認真的女人最美麗
Tony Four	說變就變
Tiger Huang	她的歌
Malas Kao	刻骨銘心
Luo Wen Cong	真情放袂開
Yokuy Utaw	生日領悟
Evon	危險天使

=== Concerts produced ===
Concert	Venue	Year
"Da Xue Cheng 30 Years Anniversary Concert" (大學城的青春迴響曲)	Taipei International Convention Center	2013
"There's a Song in Everyone's Heart" (每個人心中都有一首歌) Concert by Hsiao-Wen Ting	National Sun Yat-sen Memorial Hall	2014
"Min Ge Chuan Qi Zai Tai Zhong" (民歌傳奇在台中) Concert by Hsiao-Wen Ting	Legacy Taichung	2015
"Ni Shi Wo Suo You De Hui Yi" (你是我所有的回憶) Concert by Taipei Symphony Orchestra	Daan Forest Park	2017

== Awards and recognition ==
Year	Awards
1984	1st place in songwriting ("Ba Wo" 把握) in Cyan Rhyme of Fu Jen Catholic University
1985	2nd place in songwriting ("Shen Hua" 神話) and Stage Performance in the 2nd National Universities Songs Producing Contest (Da Xue Cheng 大學城)
1986	2nd place in songwriting, "If I Can" (如果能夠), in the 3rd National Universities Songs Producing Contest (Da Xue Cheng 大學城)
1986	Asia Records 1986 Best New Artist
1991	“Best Seller Award” of China Record Shanghai Corporation ("Home Again Without You" 愛上一個不回家的人)
1992	“Song of the Year Award” of Radio Television Hong Kong ("Home Again Without You" 愛上一個不回家的人)
1992	“Top Ten Songs of the Year Award” of Radio Television Hong Kong ("Home Again Without You" 愛上一個不回家的人)
1994	Awarded “Song of the Year” in the 6th Golden Melody Awards ("Zhu Fu" 祝福)
1994	2nd place in "Outstanding Chinese Song Award" (優秀國語歌曲) of Top Ten Chinese Gold Songs Award Concert ("Zhu Fu" 祝福)
