= Jeff Chang (singer) =

Taiwanese singer (born 1967)

- 張信哲
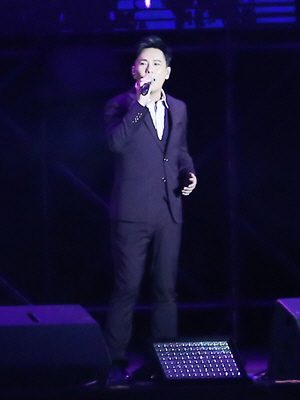
- Born: 26 March 1967 (age 59); Xiluo, Yunlin, Taiwan
- Occupations: Singer, actor, producer, art collector
- Years active: 1989–present
- Awards: Golden Melody Awards – Best Mandarin Male Artist; 1996

Chinese name
- Traditional Chinese: 張信哲
- Simplified Chinese: 张信哲
Transcriptions
Standard Mandarin
- Hanyu Pinyin: Zhāng Xìn Zhé
Hakka
- Pha̍k-fa-sṳ: Chông Sin-chet
Yue: Cantonese
- Jyutping: Zoeng1 Seon3 Zit3
Southern Min
- Hokkien POJ: Tiuⁿ Sìn-tiat
- Musical career
- Also known as: Zhang Xinzhe
- Genres: Mandopop, Cantopop
- Instruments: Vocals; violin; piano
- Labels: Elite Music Co, EMI, Sony Music, Tide Music

Jeff Chang Shin-che (Chinese: 張信哲; Pe̍h-ōe-jī: Tiuⁿ Sìn-tiat; Pha̍k-fa-sṳ: Chông Sin-chet; born 26 March 1967) is a Taiwanese singer and actor, who is known for his numerous chart-topping sentimental Mandarin pop ballads.

== Early life ==
Chang was born in Xiluo Township, Yunlin County, Taiwan. He started his philanthropic works as a voluntary teacher in impoverished areas of Taiwan since he was in high school.

== Career ==
Chang started off his showbiz career by winning a singing competition while in college, in which Hsiao-Wen Ting was a judge. Since 1989 he has released a string of highly successful albums and is known as the "Prince of Love Ballads" in the Chinese pop world. His name is well known across Taiwan, Hong Kong, Southeast Asia and mainland China.

After completing his military service in 1992, Jeff Chang returned to the music scene and his album Knowing is still a best-seller. However, at this time, Jeff Chang felt that his music career had reached a bottleneck period and began to seek transformation and breakthroughs. He refused various commercial performances and stayed silent for a year to create a new album Worrying. The song "Love Like Tide" in this album became the most classic love song that pushed Jeff Chang to the peak of his career, and the musical style of "Zhe-style love songs" began to take shape.

In 1994, Jeff Chang released the album Waiting, and the title song "Don't Be Afraid that I'll Be Sad" became another classic work of Jeff Chang; "A Little Touched" sung with Carina Lau is still one of the most popular duet songs in KTV.

Besides singing, Chang's interests include arts, antiques, traveling and water sports, and stage production. He became Taipei's leader in a stage theatre team in 2011.

In 2016, Chang participated in the fourth season of the Chinese reality show I Am a Singer and eventually achieved second place.

== Discography ==
Compilations are listed only if they contain never-released-before singles.

=== Mandarin ===
- Lie 說謊 (1989)
- Blue 憂鬱 (1989)
- Forget Me Not 忘記 (1989)
- Knowing 知道 (1992)
- Worrying 心事 (1993)
- Waiting 等待 (1994)
- Possession 擁有 (1995)
- Intoxicated 醉心 (1995)
- Generosity 寬容 (1995)
- Dream 夢想 (1996)
- Adore 摯愛 (1997)
- Intuition 直覺 (1997)
- Please Come Back 回來 (1999)
- Faith 信仰 (2000)
- How I Miss 我好想 (2001)
- Beginning → Now 從開始到現在 (2002)
- The Next Eternity 下一個永遠 (2004)
- Be Your Man 做你的男人 (2006)
- Escape 逃生 (2008)
- Genesis 初 (2010)
- Unfinished Childhood 花季未了 (2011)
- Spare Time 空出來的時間 (2012)
- Love Jeff (还爱) (2015)
- Song Era(歌时代) (2016)
- Everlasting (擁恆) (2017)
- Song Era II (歌時代II) (2018)
- See the Light (就懂了) (2021)

=== Cantonese ===
- Deep Love 深情 (February 1996)
- Longing / Thinking 思念 (January 1997)
- The Best Collection of Jeff Chang 收藏精選 (1998)
- Full of Mercy 到處留情 (July 1998)
- August Snow 雪國八月 (2007)

=== English ===
- My Eyes Adored You (1992)
- Somewhere in My Broken Heart 心碎深處 (1995)
- The Color of the Night 夜色 (1996)
- A Matter of Love (Jan 2021)

== Selected filmography ==
=== Film ===
Year	English title	Original title	Role	Notes
2002	A Pinwheel Without Wind	煙雨紅顏	Lin Shuang-ran	
2006	Ming Ming	明明	Brother Cat	
2006	Stand in Love	不完全戀人	Unknown	Music film; also as producer
2012	You and Me	我和你	Zhang Jiaxuan	
2019	Dancing Elephant	跳舞吧！大象	Sky	

=== Television series ===
Year	English title	Original title	Role	Notes
2001	Marmalade Boy	橘子醬男孩	Music teacher	Cameo
2002	Father in Wheelchair	輪椅上的父親		Cameo

== Awards and nominations ==
Year	Award	Category	Nominated work	Result
1990	2nd Golden Melody Awards	Best Male Mandarin Singer	Forget Me Not	Nominated
1995	RTHK Top 10 Gold Songs Awards	Outstanding Mandarin Song (Bronze)	"不要對他說"	Won
1996	7th Golden Melody Awards	Best Male Mandarin Singer	Generosity	Won
1997	8th Golden Melody Awards	Best Male Mandarin Singer	Dream	Nominated
1997	MTV Video Music Awards	International Viewer's Choice Awards - MTV Mandarin	"Affection"	Nominated
1999	MTV Video Music Awards	International Viewer's Choice Awards - MTV Mandarin	"Love Turning Around" (with Harlem Yu)	Nominated
2010	2nd Macau International Movie Festival	Golden Lotus Award for Best Supporting Actor	You and Me	Won
2011	Star Awards 2011	Best Theme Song	"网"	Won
2015	Huading Awards	Public Image Survey - Best Male Singer	—N/a	Won
