= Golden Lotus Award for Best Supporting Actor =

Annual Chinese film award

Golden Lotus Award for Best Supporting Actor (simplified Chinese: 金莲花奖最佳男配角; traditional Chinese: 金蓮花獎最佳男配角) is the main category of Competition of Golden Lotus Awards. Awarding to supporting actor(s) who have outstanding performance in motion pictures.

== Award winners and nominees ==
=== 2000s ===
==== 2009 (1st) ====
Year	Winner and nominees (English)	Winner and nominees (Chinese)	English title	Original title
2009	Niu Piao	牛飘	Bao Gui's Secret	《宝贵的秘密》
2009	Hu Xiaoguang	胡晓光	White Mountain	《天山雪》
2009	Ming Dow	明道	Life of Sentime	《感情生活》
2009	Li Mengnan	李梦男	Ma Wen's Battle	《马文的战争》

=== 2010s ===
==== 2010 (2nd) ====
Year	Winner and nominees (English)	Winner and nominees (Chinese)	English title	Original title
2010	Jeff Chang Shin-Che	张信哲	You and Me	《我和你》
2010	Wei Zongwan	魏宗万	A Singing Fairy	《寻找刘三姐》
2010	Li Liqun	李立群	The Robbers	《我的唐朝兄弟》
2010	Huang Bo	黄渤	Xun Zhao Wei Chen	《寻找微尘》

==== 2011 (3rd) ====
Year	Winner and nominees (English)	Winner and nominees (Chinese)	English title	Original title
2011	Anthony Wong	黄秋生	The Woman Knight of Mirror Lake	《竞雄女侠秋瑾》
2011	Nie Yuan	聂远	The Lost Bladesman	《关云长》
2011	Eric Tsang	曾志伟	Heroes	《英雄·喋血》
2011	Victor Huang	黄维德	The Devil Inside Me	《夺命心跳》

==== 2012 (4th) ====
Year	Winner and nominees (English)	Winner and nominees (Chinese)	English title	Original title
2012	Na Wei	那威	One Night To Be Star	《一夜成名》
2012	Alec Su	苏有朋	All For Love	《三个未婚妈妈》
2012	Liu Hua	刘桦	Under the Temptation	《四戒》
2012	Vitas	维塔斯	One Night To Be Star	《一夜成名》

==== 2013 (5th) ====
Year	Winner and nominees (English)	Winner and nominees (Chinese)	English title	Original title
2013	William Chan	陈伟霆	As the Light Goes Out	《救火英雄》
2013	Vic Chou	周渝民	Saving General Yang	《忠烈杨家将》
2013	Hu Ge	胡歌	Diva	《华丽之后》
2013	Wong Bak-Ming	黄百鸣	Hotel Deluxe	《百星酒店》

==== 2014 (6th) ====
Year	Winner and nominees (English)	Winner and nominees (Chinese)	English title	Original title
2014	None	None	None	None
2014	Wang Baoqiang	王宝强	Kung Fu Jungle	《一个人的武林》
2014	Andy On	安志杰	That Demon Within	《魔警》
2014	William Chan	陈伟霆	Golden Brother	《男人不可以穷》
2014	Du Haitao	杜海涛	But Always	《一生一世》
2014	Wang Xuebing	王学兵	Beijing Love Story	《北京爱情故事》

==== 2015 (7th) ====
Year	Winner and nominees (English)	Winner and nominees (Chinese)	English title	Original title
2015	Carlos Chan	陈家乐	Happiness	《幸运是我》
2015	Mike Tyson	迈克·泰森	Ip Man 3	《叶问3》
2015	Leo Ku	古巨基	Two Thumbs Up	《冲锋车》
2015	Zhang Hanyu	张涵予	Mr. Six	《老炮儿》
2015	Yan Weiwen	阎维文	Fengyu Rishengchang	《风雨日昇昌》

==== 2016 (8th) ====
Year	Winner and nominees (English)	Winner and nominees (Chinese)	English title	Original title
2016	Liu Peiqi	刘佩琦	Lord of Shanghai	《上海王》
2016	Tony Yang	杨祐宁	My War	《我的战争》
2016	Ethan Juan	阮经天	Never Said Goodbye	《谎言西西里》
2016	Luo Jin	罗晋	Xuanzang	《大唐玄奘》
2016	Alex Fong	方中信	Perfect Imperfection	《我是处女座》
2016	Wang Zijian	王自健	The Insanity	《你好，疯子!》

==== 2017 (9th) ====
No winners.

Year	Winner and nominees (English)	Winner and nominees (Chinese)	English title	Original title
2017	Yue Yunpeng	岳云鹏	Top Funny Comedian: The Movie	《欢乐喜剧人》
2017	Du Chun	杜淳	The Wasted Times	《罗曼蒂克消亡史》
2017	Shawn Yue	余文樂	Wu Kong	《悟空传》
2017	Zhang Yixing	张艺兴	The Founding of an Army	《建军大业》
2017	Zhang Yishan	张一山	A Paper Marriage	《一纸婚约》
