= Zero Point Five Love =

- Directed by: GengXiao
- Production companies: Hebei Zhibao Media Co., Ltd; Beijing Shangshi Zhiguang Media Technology Co., Ltd
- Release date: September 12, 2014
- Running time: 85 minutes
- Country: China
- Language: Mandarin
- Box office: ¥0.54 million (China)

Zero Point Five Love (Chinese: 0.5的爱情) is a 2014 Chinese romance film directed by GengXiao. It was released on September 12, 2014.

== Plot ==
Chen Zi Hao, a lifelong bachelor, meets Ye Ting, who has returned to her hometown after studying abroad. Despite their differing outlooks on life, the two develop a relationship. When Zi Hao decides to propose to Ye Ting, she suddenly disappears.

== Cast ==
- Purba Rgyal as Chen Zi Hao
- Jessie Chiang as Ye Ting
- Cheng Yuan Yuan as Lin Jing
- Jie Xi
- Yue Ming Li

== Reception ==
It has earned ¥0.54 million at the Chinese box office.
