= Xuanzang (film) =

2016 Chinese-Indian film by Huo Jianqi

- Film poster

Chinese name
- Traditional Chinese: 大唐玄奘
- Simplified Chinese: 大唐玄奘
Transcriptions
Standard Mandarin
- Hanyu Pinyin: Dà Táng Xuánzàng
- Directed by: Huo Jianqi
- Written by: Zou Jingzhi
- Produced by: Wong Kar-wai
- Starring: Huang Xiaoming
- Cinematography: Sun Ming
- Edited by: Cao Weijie
- Music by: Wang Xiaofeng
- Production companies: China Film Corporation; Eros International
- Distributed by: China Film Group Corporation
- Release date: 29 April 2016
- Running time: 118 minutes
- Countries: China; India
- Languages: Mandarin; Sanskrit
- Box office: CN¥32.9 million

Xuanzang is a 2016 Chinese-Indian historical adventure film that dramatizes the life of Xuanzang (602–664), a Buddhist monk and scholar. The film depicts his arduous nearly two-decade overland journey to India during the Tang dynasty on a mission to bring Buddhist scriptures to China. The film is directed by Huo Jianqi and produced by Wong Kar-wai. It stars Huang Xiaoming as the titular character, and includes cameo or short performances by other accomplished actors including Kent Tong, Purba Rgyal, Sonu Sood and Tan Kai. It was released in China on 29 April 2016, with distribution in China by China Film Group Corporation. It was selected as the Chinese entry for the Best Foreign Language Film at the 89th Academy Awards but was not nominated. It won the Golden Angel Award Film and the best screenwriter categories at the 12th Chinese American Film Festival and was nominated in several categories at the 31st Golden Rooster Awards.

== Plot ==
During the Tang dynasty's era of "Zhen Guan" (of Emperor Taizong), Xuanzang, a young Buddhist monk, in his quest to find the essence of Buddhism, embarks on a journey to India. The journey that is fraught with perils and dangers. He encounters natural disasters, and sees the sufferings of the common people. Soldiers get in his way and his disciple betrays him. He struggles to get across deserts, running short on food and water, and traverses treacherous snow-covered mountain ranges. He finally arrives in India, and studies Buddhism in earnest. By the time he returns to China, he is a little over 40 years old. He devotes the remainder of his life to translating and studying the Sanskrit scriptures that he carried back from India.

== Cast ==
The story of Xuanzang's epic quest is shown as a series of encounters with characters portrayed in cameo performances listed in part below in order of appearance. The film periodically includes maps to show his progress to the locations where the encounters occur.

- Huang Xiaoming as Xuanzang, the titular protagonist and only character seen throughout the duration of the film.
- Jonathan Kos-Read as Alexander Cunningham, British archaeologist active during India's colonial period who attests to the accuracy of Xuanzang's accounts of India in an introduction.
- Zhao Liang as imperial edict reader, who announced that, because of a famine, the citizens of Chang'an may leave. According to the film's text insert, this allows Xuanzang to join the exodus in 627.
- Xu Zheng as Li Daliang, the governor of Liangzhou who ordered Xuanzang to return to Chang'an.
- Karim Hajee as Haihui, the senior Buddhist priest in the region of Hexi who helped Xuanzang. He sent two acolytes to accompany Xuanzang for a while.
- Luo Jin as Li Chang, sympathetic prefect of Guazhou who tore up a warrant for Xuanzang's arrest.
- Vivian Dawson as Wu Qing, Silk Road merchant, leading a caravan through the desert which Xuanzang joins for a while.
- Lou Jiayue as a woman from the western region who joins Xuanzang for a while and whose father gives Xuanzang an old horse who knows the way.
- Purba Rgyal as Shi Putuo, aka Vandak, a disciple who approaches chanting Xuanzang with a knife with an intent to kill him. In the end, he does not do it but is sent away.
- Tan Kai as Wang Xiang, watchtower captain, whose men shoot arrows at Xuanzang but who sends him on his way after learning of his mission.
- Che Xiao as Xuanzang's mother (flashback). Xuanzang has a vision of his mother while hallucinating in the Taklamakan Desert after spilling his water. He is saved by his old horse which carries him unconscious to Wild Horse Spring and then to Gaochang.
- Jiang Chao as King Aratürük, whom Xuanzang meets in Yi Wu, today's Hami, after traversing the desert at the end of 629. He asks Xuanzang to visit the neighboring kingdom of Gaochang (Karakhajo). Xuanzang complies despite reservations.
- Andrew Lin as Qu Wentai, king of Gaochang, who tried to force Xuanzang to remain with him, which caused Xuanzang to begin a hunger strike. The king relents and sends escorts to accompany Xuanzang across the treacherous snow-covered mountain peaks of Lingshan (in Tian Shan mountain ranges).
- Gao Xing as Gaochang queen
- Kent Tong as Mucha Judou, perhaps the King of Kucha, who along with the virtuous monk, Moksha Gupta, greeted Xuanzang ceremoniously with beautiful music and dancing. Xuanzang waited at the capital for better weather before crossing the mountains and then continuing his travels to India.
- Ram Gopal Bajaj as Śīlabhadra, the Right Dharma Store at Nalanda Temple in India which Xuanzang reached in Aug 631. Xuanzang kissed his feet and asked to become his student.
- Ali Fazal as Jayaram, a slave who was cursed by his master for touching his daughter while rescuing her from a fire. Jayaram was able to save some of the scriptures when Xuanzang's boat capsized and was eventually freed of his curse with Xuanzang's help.
- Neha Sharma as Kumari, Jayaram's wife, who was cast out by her father.
- Sonu Sood as Emperor Harshavardhana who invites Śīlabhadra, of Nalanda Temple to send representatives to a Great Debate on the merits of Mahayana and Hinayana Buddhism. Xuanzang was chosen as the chief defender of Mahayana Buddhism. Emperor Harsha declared him the winner.
- Mandana Karimi as Rajyashri, Emperor Harsha's sister.
- Winston Chao as Emperor Taizong of Tang, who welcomed Xuanzang back to Tang China in 642 where Xuanzang wrote translations of the scriptures that he had brought back with him. Emperor Taizong wrote the preface.

== Soundtrack ==
- "Heart Sutra" performed by Faye Wong
- "Qiannian Yibore" (千年一般若) performed by Huang Xiaoming & Han Lei

== Production ==
The film was produced by China's biggest state owned production company China Film Corporation and its Indian partner Eros International. It was a prestige project as the first agreement on joint productions was signed in the presence of Indian Prime Minister Narendra Modi and General Secretary of the Chinese Communist Party Xi Jinping in May 2015.

It was filmed on location in Turpan (including the Flaming Mountain Scenic Area), Changji, Altay, Aksu, Kashi all of which are in the Xinjiang province of China, the Gansu province of China, and India. The sets were lavish, hundreds of extras were used and 10 companies from the US and China comprising 200 people were hired for post-production.

In an interview with the Hindustan Times, translated from Chinese, the director noted that most of the shoots were outdoors. "It was physically taxing. In India, we spent 10 days in April and May and another 20 days in September... The heat and the sun were all very challenging."

The primary language spoken in the film is Mandarin. However, an important dialog between Xuanzang and his master, Śīlabhadra, is in Sanskrit. The director noted that "We spent a long time with Sanskrit scholars, both in India and Peking University, to get this right, and we had Huang Xiaoming do the lines himself".

== Consistency with historical biography ==
The film is based on a script by Xue Keqiao and Mu Jun which in turn is based on a biography by a Tang Buddhist monk, Sramana Huili. The manuscript of Huili's biography was scattered after his death but was recompiled by another monk, Shi Yancong.

The film credits list many advisors and venerable priests, nevertheless, liberties were taken for dramatic effect. For example, the film begins with a scene of baby Xuanzang being placed in a basket and floated down river where he is rescued by a monk who teaches him Buddhist scriptures. However, his biography indicates that he was raised at home and taught the scriptures by his father and older brother.

In the film, as Vandak, the fallen disciple, departs, he advises Xuanzang to find an old horse who knows the way. Xuanzang meets a "woman from the western region" (per film credits) who accompanies him in the desert and her father later gives him the horse. In the biography, Xuanzang had bought a new horse. Before setting out across the desert, he meets Bandha (Vandak) who is accompanied by an old man riding a skinny roan horse. Xuanzang remembers a prophecy about his journey on an old horse. The old man's horse and his saddle match the prophecy exactly; so, he trades his sturdy horse for the skinny one, which later saves his life.

In the film, men (and their horses) escorting Xuanzang across the Lingshan mountains are caught in an avalanche. In the biography, he lost about 1/3rd of his men and many oxen and horses, but the deaths were caused by cold and hunger, not an avalanche.

In the film, Xuanzang sets out across a river in a boat loaded with an elephant and his scriptures. A sudden storm capsizes the boat, and all including Xuanzang, the scriptures and elephant fall into the river. The slave, Jayaram, dives underwater to rescue some of the scriptures. In the biography, the boat is tossed by the waves but does not overturn. The unnamed guardian of the scriptures falls overboard. He is saved by the other passengers, but the scriptures are lost. Xuanzang was wading across the river on the elephant, and they were not on board.

== Reception ==
The film grossed US$2.94 million on its opening weekend in China. It received mixed reviews there. According to a review in the India Today: "As of May 3, [2016] Xuanzang was a lowly seventh at the box office, despite heavy government promotion, earning less than a tenth of a top-grossing Chinese romantic comedy that released on the same day." It was criticized for a thin storyline consisting primarily of random occurrences during his journey.

On the other hand, websites catering to those more interested in Chinese drama and history had more positive responses. For example, a review by Derek Elley on Sino-Cinema commented that "most of Xuanzang's encounters are quite engrossing, thanks to the casting" and he goes on to praise several of the actors. He further commented that: "Given the need to have a star in the title role, and one who can project a strong sense of conviction, Huang is an excellent choice, all firm jaw and intense gaze. Though he doesn't get much chance to build a personality for Xuanzang outside his Buddhist platitudes, Huang does manage to carry the film on his shoulders . . ." The photography is referred to as "stunning". The Chasing Dramas: All Things Chinese Dramas website summed up a lengthy review with a comment that It was a thoroughly enjoyable watch and it appeared to stay pretty true to history "– so if you want to spend 2 hours watching the gorgeous landscape and learn about history, this is the movie for you."

During an interview with India Today, the director, Huo Jianqi, insisted that Xuanzang was worth the effort, and has praised both governments for backing what he says is a long-overdue venture. "This wasn't about making money," he said, "this was about telling the real story of someone who changed our history, not a magical story that could have sold well at the box office."

== Awards and nominations ==
- 12th Chinese American Film Festival
  - Golden Angel Award Film
  - Best Screenwriter
- 31st Golden Rooster Awards
  - Nominated – Best Cinematography (Sun Ming)
  - Nominated – Best Sound (Chao Jun)
  - Nominated – Best Art Direction (Wu Ming)
  - Nominated – Best Original Music Score (Wang Xiaofeng)

== See also ==
- List of submissions to the 89th Academy Awards for Best Foreign Language Film
- List of Chinese submissions for the Academy Award for Best Foreign Language Film

== Biographical Sources ==
- Li, Rongxi, trans. (1995). A Biography of the Tripiṭaka Master of the Great Ci'en Monastery of the Great Tang Dynasty by Sramana Huili and Shi Yancong. Numata Center for Buddhist Translation and Research. Berkeley, California. ISBN 1-886439-00-1 (a recent, full translation)
- Wriggins, Sally Hovey (2004). The Silk Road Journey with Xuanzang. Boulder, Colorado: Westview Press. ISBN 0-8133-6599-6.
