= The Myth (TV series) =

Television series

- Promotional poster

Chinese name
- Traditional Chinese: 神話
- Simplified Chinese: 神话
Transcriptions
Standard Mandarin
- Hanyu Pinyin: Shénhuà
- Genre: Historical fiction Time travel Romance
- Written by: Li Haishu
- Directed by: Jeffrey Chiang
- Creative director: Stanley Tong
- Starring: Hu Ge; Michelle Bai; Chang Shih; Ren Quan; Zhang Meng; Li Yixiang; Chen Zihan; Tan Kai; Allen Ting; Jin Sha
- Opening theme: Time Travel by Zhang Meng and Wang Haixiang
- Ending theme: Beautiful Myth performed by Hu Ge and Michelle Bai
- Country of origin: China
- Original language: Mandarin
- No. of episodes: 50

Production
- Executive producer: Wu Yueming
- Producer: Jackie Chan
- Production location: China
- Editor: CCTV
- Running time: 45 minutes per episode
- Production company: Emperor Entertainment Group
- Budget: 40 million yuan

Original release
- Network: CCTV-8
- Release: 2 January – 18 January 2010

Related
- The Myth (film); Kung Fu Yoga

The Myth is a 2010 Chinese television series based on the 2005 Hong Kong film of the same title. Jackie Chan, who starred in the original film, was credited as the producer for the series, while Stanley Tong, who directed the film, was the creative director for the series. The series was first aired on CCTV-8 in China in January 2010.

== Plot ==
By coincidence, Yi Xiaochuan finds a tiger pendant which sears a mark onto his chest when he wears it on his neck. Meanwhile, his brother, Yi Dachuan, discovers a 2,000-year-old treasure box at an excavation site. Xiaochuan unlocks the box with his pendant and opens a time portal by accident. Unknown to everyone else, he is transported back in time to the Qin dynasty together with Gao Yao, his girlfriend's brother.

Back in the Qin dynasty, Xiaochuan meets Xiang Yu and Liu Bang and becomes sworn brothers with them. He also encounters Meng Tian, who insists that Xiaochuan is his long-lost younger brother Meng Yi because the mark of the pendant belongs to the Meng family. While serving as a general of the Qin Empire, Xiaochuan meets Yushu, a princess of the tribal kingdom Tu'an. They develop romantic feelings but cannot be together as Yushu has become the Qin emperor's concubine in exchange for peace between her kingdom and the Qin Empire. Xiaochuan is unwilling to give up and he secretly meets Yushu inside the palace.

On the other hand, Gao Yao is separated from Xiaochuan and sent to the palace, where he is forcefully castrated and made to serve the royal family as a eunuch. After enduring humiliation and bullying, he earns the favour of the emperor through his culinary skills and rises through the ranks. Now known as Zhao Gao, he starts taking revenge on those who were responsible for his plight. As he becomes increasingly influential in the imperial court, he becomes corrupted by power and starts turning against his old buddy Xiaochuan, whom he now sees as a threat to his plan to dominate the empire.

In the present-day, Dachuan, Gao Lan (Xiaochuan's girlfriend), and Dachuan's parents, work closely to open the treasure box. Following clues from the box's engravings and a map, they embark on a treasure hunt to find the five secret keys to unlock the box. However, a mysterious masked man in black is also after the box's contents and he sends his henchmen to harass them.

== Cast ==
Main cast

- Hu Ge as Yi Xiaochuan, a freelance photographer who travels back in time to the Qin dynasty. He is renamed Meng Yi and becomes a general in the Qin army.
- Michelle Bai as Yushu, the princess of Tu'an who is forced to become Qin Shi Huang's concubine. She is Meng Yi's love interest.
- Chang Shih as Gao Yao, Gao Lan's elder brother and a celebrity chef. He travels back in time with Yi Xiaochuan and becomes a eunuch in the Qin palace and renames himself Zhao Gao.
- Alina Zhang as Gao Lan, Yi Xiaochuan's girlfriend who becomes Yi Dachuan's love interest after Xiaochuan's disappearance. Zhang also portrayed Xiaoyue, a palace maid who becomes Xiang Yu's lover Consort Yu.
- Ren Quan as Yi Dachuan, Yi Xiaochuan's brother and an archaeologist.
- Li Yixiang as Liu Bang, Meng Yi's sworn brother who becomes the founding emperor of the Han dynasty.
- Chen Zihan as Lü Zhi, Liu Bang's wife.
- Tan Kai as Xiang Yu, Meng Yi's sworn brother who becomes Liu Bang's rival.
- Jin Sha as Lü Su, Lü Zhi's younger sister and Meng Yi's first love interest.
- Allen Ting as Meng Tian, a Qin general who claims that Yi Xiaochuan is his long-lost brother Meng Yi.

Supporting cast

- Xu Min as Yi Suochang, Dachuan and Xiaochuan's father.
- Xu Di as Dachuan and Xiaochuan's mother, an expert locksmith.
- Zhao Cong as Luo La, a follower of the masked man.
- Chen Qiguo as Lü Gong, the father of Lü Zhi and Lü Su.
- Zhou Yemang as Fan Zeng, an adviser to Xiang Liang and Xiang Yu.
- Dong Ziwu as Xiang Liang, Xiang Yu's uncle and a rebel leader.
- Yang Shutian as Cui Wenzi, an eccentric physician.
- Yizhen as General Jin, a general of Tu'an.
- Wei Lai as Lady Meng Jiang
- Zhu Hongtao as Fan Qiliang, a labourer and Lady Meng Jiang's husband.
- Zang Jinsheng as Qin Shi Huang, the emperor of the Qin dynasty.
- Ma Wenlong as Fusu, the Qin crown prince and a student of Meng Tian.
- Liu Xiaoxi as Li Si, the Qin chancellor.
- Shi Tianshuo as Li You, a Qin general and Li Si's son.
- Liu Dong as General Pang, Meng Tian's subordinate.
- Zhang Wei as Gao Jianli, a friend of Jing Ke.
- Liu Xuan as Xiang Zhuang, Xiang Yu's cousin.
- Zhang Chunzhong as Zhongli Mo, a general under Xiang Yu.
- Meng Qi as Huhai, the future second emperor of Qin.
- Tong Xiaohu as the keeper of the Night Glow Pearl.
- Wang Ju as Squad leader Tian, who leads the espionage mission to cripple Xiongnu forces.
- Li Lie as Palikuo, the Xiongnu leader.
- Gao Liang as the masked man in black who is after the treasure box.
- Jiang Xiuzhen as Qingqing, a tour guide.
- Dong Kefei as Sanbao, Meng Yi's subordinate who later joins Zhao Gao but remains faithful to Meng.
- Song Xinjie as Dexiang, a Xiongnu spy who becomes Meng Yi's servant.
- Wang Zhixia as the queen of Tu'an and mother of Yushu.
- Gao Yuanfeng, Peng Zhi, and Li Bing as Guisha, Tiansha, and Disha respectively, three hooligans from Guandong hired by Zhao Gao.
- Yan Yanlong and Shi Guodong as Ye Feng and Ma Ge respectively, the masked man's henchmen.
- Li Biqu as the descendant of the Wood element keeper.

== Soundtrack ==
- Chuanyue (穿越; Time Travel) by Zhang Meng and Wang Haixiang
- Jide Caihong (記得彩虹; Remember the Rainbow) by Zhang Meng
- Liuzi Ge (六字歌; Six Character Song) performed by Chen Jiafeng and Wang Yan
- Xingyue Shenhua (星月神話; Myth of the Stars and Moon) by Jin Sha
- Meili De Shenhua (美麗的神話; Beautiful Myth) by Hu Ge and Michelle Bai

== Awards ==
Year	Award	Category	Winner
2010	China Student Television Festival	Most Popular Actor	Hu Ge
2010	Huading Awards	Most Popular Fantasy Drama	The Myth
2010	Huading Awards	Best Actor (legend)	Hu Ge
