= Love of the Aegean Sea =

- Also known as: 情定愛琴海
- Genre: Romance
- Starring: Alec Su; Peter Ho; Chae Rim
- Country of origin: Taiwan
- No. of episodes: 40

Original release
- Network: CTS
- Release: April 1 – May 26, 2004

Love of the Aegean Sea (Chinese: 情定爱琴海; pinyin: Qíng dìng ài qínhǎi) is a romantic Taiwanese drama starring Alec Su, Peter Ho, and Chae Rim.

== Storyline ==
Guan Xiao Tong, a top student at Shanghai Conservatory, is about to leave for a vacation in Greece when her cousin unexpectedly cancels, claiming illness.

The drama opens with fascinating scenery in Greece, the destination Guan Xiaotong (Chae Rim) and the travel mate she found herself over the Internet, Li Yaoxiang (Peter Ho), are heading to. Arguing with Li time after time in the trip, Guan packs up to return home out of spite. She then meets Lu Enqi (Alec Su), who has been upset with his mother's matchmaking. The two decide to head for the Greek island of Santorini and begin to fall for each other. Their love story, however, does not develop into what they expected, and they begin to fall into the love entanglement with Li.

== Cast ==
- Alec Su as Lu En Qi
- Chae Rim as Guan Xiaotong
- Peter Ho as Li Yaoxiang
