= Old House Has Joy =

- Also known as: My Cousin Ji Xiang 表妹吉祥
- 老房有喜
- Created by: Lai Jianguo
- Starring: Zhao Wei, Alec Su
- Country of origin: Taiwan, China
- No. of episodes: 25

Production
- Running time: 1 hour per episode(including commercials)

Original release
- Release: March 3, 1999 – April 1999

Old House Has Joy (老房有喜) is TV series which was produced in mainland China and Taiwan in 1998. It starred Zhao Wei and Alec Su.

== Cast ==
- Zhao Wei starred as Ji Xiang and Li Mei
- Alec Su starred as Su Xiao Peng and young Su San
- Tian Feng starred as Su San
- Chen Min - Li Ming Hua
- Zhu Man Feng - Grandma Li
- Cao Duo - Su Zhong
- Tai Zhi Yuan - Wu You Li

== International broadcast ==
Country or Region	Network	Premiere	Title
China	Shanghai Television	1999	老房有喜
Hong Kong	Asia Television	1999	表妹吉祥
Taiwan	China Television	2000	表妹吉祥
South Korea	Gyeongin Broadcasting iTV	2000	
Vietnam	Vietnam Television	2000	Cô em họ Cát Tường
Singapore	Singapore Cable Vision	2001	表妹吉祥
