= Switch (2013 film) =

2013 Chinese-Hong Kong film by Jay Sun

- Official release poster
- Traditional Chinese: 天機：富春山居圖
- Simplified Chinese: 天机：富春山居图
- Hanyu Pinyin: Tiān Jī: Fù Chūn Shān Jū Tú
- Jyutping: Tin1 Gei1: Fu3 Ceon1 Saan1 Geoi1 Tou4
- Directed by: Jay Sun
- Written by: Jay Sun
- Produced by: Zhao Haicheng; Shen Xue; He Lichang
- Starring: Andy Lau; Tong Dawei; Zhang Jingchu; Lin Chi-ling
- Cinematography: Shao Dan
- Edited by: Du Hengtao
- Music by: Roc Chen
- Production companies: China Film Group; Pegasus Entertainment; Media Asia Films; Phoenix Satellite Television
- Distributed by: Media Asia Distribution
- Release dates: 9 June 2013 (China); 12 June 2013 (Hong Kong)
- Running time: 122 minutes
- Countries: China; Hong Kong
- Languages: Mandarin; Japanese; English
- Budget: ¥160 million
- Box office: ¥302.6 million

Switch is a 2013 action film written and directed by Jay Sun and starring Andy Lau, Tong Dawei, Zhang Jingchu and Lin Chi-ling. A Chinese-Hong Kong co-production, the film was released on 9 June 2013 in China, and in Hong Kong on 12 June 2013.

== Synopsis ==
A famous Chinese Yuan Dynasty painting known as "Dwelling in the Fuchun Mountains" was stolen and being sold on the black market, led by a mysterious business magnate. Special agent Jinhan is tasked to recover the painting.

Meanwhile, Jinhan and his wife have drifted apart, due to the secret nature of his work, unaware that his wife also works as a special agent tasked with protecting the painting.

== Cast ==
- Andy Lau as Special Agent Xiao Jinhan
- Tong Dawei as Yamamoto Toshio
- Zhang Jingchu as Lin Yuyan
- Lin Chi-ling as Lisa
- Siqin Gaowa as The Empress
- Ariel Aisin-Gioro as The Princess
- Guan Xiaotong as Xiao Yueyue
- Siqin Gaowa as Old Dowager Empress
- Tan Songyun as Pisces Demon

== Release ==
Switch was originally set to be released in 2012, but was delayed partially due to the decision to convert the film to 3-D. The film was released in China on 9 June 2013 and in Hong Kong on 12 June, where its running time was trimmed by 9 minutes with several scenes cut out.

In China, the film grossed RMB 49 million (US$8 million) in its opening day, the third-biggest opening day revenue for a domestic film in China.

== Reception ==
Maggie Lee of Variety stated the film "epitomizes[...]so-bad-it’s-good kitsch", pointing to a lack of plot continuity, ostentatious visuals and exaggerated, exploitation-like characterizations. Elizabeth Kerr of The Hollywood Reporter similarly criticized the film for its confusing structure and lack of impact, likening Sun to "a film school drop-out with too much cash".
