= Golden Lotus Award for Best Newcomer =

Film and television award in Macau

Golden Lotus Award for Best Newcomer (simplified Chinese: 金莲花奖最佳新人; traditional Chinese: 金蓮花獎最佳新人) has been awarded annually since 2009 by the Macau Film and Television Media Association and China International Cultural Communication Center.

== Award winners and nominees ==
=== 2000s ===
==== 2009 (1st) ====
| Year | Winner and nominees (English) | Winner and nominees (Chinese) | English title | Original title |
|---|---|---|---|---|
| 2009 | Helen Yao | 姚星彤 | Life of Sentime | 《感情生活》 |
| 2009 | Sandrine Pinna | 张榕容 | Yangyang | 《阳阳》 |
| 2009 | Ju Wenpei | 居文沛 | Set Off | 《即日启程》 |

=== 2010s ===
==== 2010 (2nd) ====
| Year | Winner and nominees (English) | Winner and nominees (Chinese) | English title | Original title |
|---|---|---|---|---|
| 2010 | Zhou Chuchu | 周楚楚 | Wild Strawberries | 《野草莓》 |
| 2010 | Ariel Aisin-Gioro | 爱新觉罗·启星 | A Tibetan Love Song | 《康定情歌》 |
| 2010 | Qiu Yanxiang | 邱彦翔 | Bed Man | 《弹簧床先生》 |
| 2010 | Renee Yuan | 苑新雨 | More Than Close | 《近在咫尺的爱恋》 |

==== 2011 (3rd) ====
| Year | Winner and nominees (English) | Winner and nominees (Chinese) | English title | Original title |
|---|---|---|---|---|
| 2011 | Wu Jianfei | 吴建飞 | She Came To My Concert | 《他来听我的演唱会》 |
| 2011 | Bai Huizi | 白卉子 | Tracks Kong Lingxue | 《跟踪孔令学》 |
| 2011 | Chrissie Chau | 周秀娜 | Beach Spike | 《热浪球爱战》 |
| 2011 | Dennis To | 杜宇航 | The Woman Knight of Mirror Lake | 《竞雄女侠·秋瑾》 |
| 2011 | Shang Hua | 尚华 | Lovers in the Water | 《摆手舞之恋》 |

==== 2012 (4th) ====
| Year | Winner and nominees (English) | Winner and nominees (Chinese) | English title | Original title |
|---|---|---|---|---|
| 2012 | None | None | None | None |

==== 2013 (5th) ====
| Year | Winner and nominees (English) | Winner and nominees (Chinese) | English title | Original title |
|---|---|---|---|---|
| 2013 | Rainbow Wang | 王力可 | My Wife Comes from Kinmen | 《金门新娘》 |

==== 2014 (6th) ====
| Year | Winner and nominees (English) | Winner and nominees (Chinese) | English title | Original title |
|---|---|---|---|---|
| 2014 | Zhang Huiwen | 张慧雯 | Coming Home | 《归来》 |

==== 2015 (7th) ====
| Year | Winner and nominees (English) | Winner and nominees (Chinese) | English title | Original title |
|---|---|---|---|---|
| 2015 | Sarah Tan | 陈沁霖 | The Kid from the Big Apple | 《我来自纽约》 |

==== 2016 (8th) ====
| Year | Winner and nominees (English) | Winner and nominees (Chinese) | English title | Original title |
|---|---|---|---|---|
| 2016 | Jeremy Liu | 刘子千 | Lonely Garden | 《孤独花园》 |
| 2016 | Sanna Chen | 陈沛钰 | Who Stole My Baby | 《谁偷了我的宝贝》 |
| 2016 | Song Jiayang | 宋佳洋 | Perfect Imperfection | 《我是处女座》 |
