= Call for Love =

- Official poster
- Traditional Chinese: 愛情呼叫轉移
- Simplified Chinese: 爱情呼叫转移
- Hanyu Pinyin: Aìqíng Hūjiào Zhuǎnyí
- Directed by: Zhang Jianya
- Written by: Liu Yiwei; Shu Huan
- Produced by: Han Sanping; Sun Jianjun
- Starring: Xu Zheng
- Cinematography: Zhi Lei
- Edited by: Cheng Jie
- Music by: Tan Yizhe
- Production companies: Beijing Film Studio; Pegasus & Taihe Entertainment; Beijing Orange Sky Golden Harvest TV & Film Production; Warner China Film HG; Shenzhou TV
- Release date: February 8, 2007 (China)
- Running time: 95 minutes
- Country: China
- Language: Mandarin

Call for Love (Chinese: 爱情呼叫转移; pinyin: Àiqíng hūjiào zhuǎnyí) is a Chinese romantic comedy film directed by Zhang Jianya. The film premiered in China on February 8, 2007. It stars Xu Zheng, Fan Bingbing, and Eva Huang.

== Plot ==
After being married for seven years, Xu Lang, a white collar office manager, has started to get tired of the same routine in his marriage. After asking his wife for a divorce, he is given a magical cell phone by an angel. The cell phone allows him to have romantic encounters with different women. After various dates and courtships with 12 beautiful women, he still cannot meet the right one. He attempts to mend things over with his wife, only to find that his ex-wife has met another man and found happiness. The movie ends with Xu meeting his old love interest from 15 years ago, suggesting a new relationship between them.

== Cast ==
- Xu Zheng as Xu Lang, protagonist
- Liu Yiwei as Angel
- Jiang Hongbo as boring wife
- Song Jia as Girl #1, easy girl
- Fan Bingbing as Girl #2, ninja cop
- Eva Huang as Girl #3, valley girl
- Michelle Bai as Girl #4, girl with intimidating mom
- Ning Jing as Girl #5, gold-digger
- Annie Yi as Girl #6, career woman with trust issues
- Qu Ying as Girl #7, overprotective dog lover
- Qin Hailu as Girl #8, feminist freak
- Shen Xing as former classmate, Xu Lang's destined romantic partner
- Gong Beibi
- Che Yongli
- Brenda Wang
- Huang Jianxiang (cameo)
- Chen Luyu (cameo)
