= Fit Lover =

- Film poster
- Directed by: Zhang Jianya
- Written by: Annie Shizuka Inoh; Shan Jiang; Li Wei; Liu Hai; Pang Pang; Shu Huan; Su Huan; Sun Pingyang; Tao Sixuan; Wang Fang; Wei Shui; Yi Ding
- Produced by: Han Sanping
- Starring: Karena Lam; Alec Su; Huang Xiaoming
- Cinematography: Zhi Lei
- Edited by: Ma Xiaojun; Yi Ding
- Distributed by: China Film Group Corporation; Beijing Film Studio
- Release date: November 28, 2008 (China)
- Running time: 110 minutes
- Country: China
- Language: Mandarin

Fit Lover (simplified Chinese: 爱情呼叫转移2爱情左右; traditional Chinese: 愛情呼叫轉移2愛情左右; pinyin: Aìqíng hūjiào zhuǎnyí II: Aìqíng zuǒ yòu) is a 2008 Chinese romantic comedy directed by Zhang Jianya. It is a spiritual sequel to Jianya's previous film, Call for Love.

In the previous film, a divorced man must choose between a dozen women. In Fit Lover, the protagonist, played by Karena Lam, must choose between several leading men.

== Cast ==
- Karena Lam
- Alec Su
- Huang Xiaoming
