= Purba Rgyal =

Chinese singer and actor of Tibetan ethnicity

- 蒲巴甲
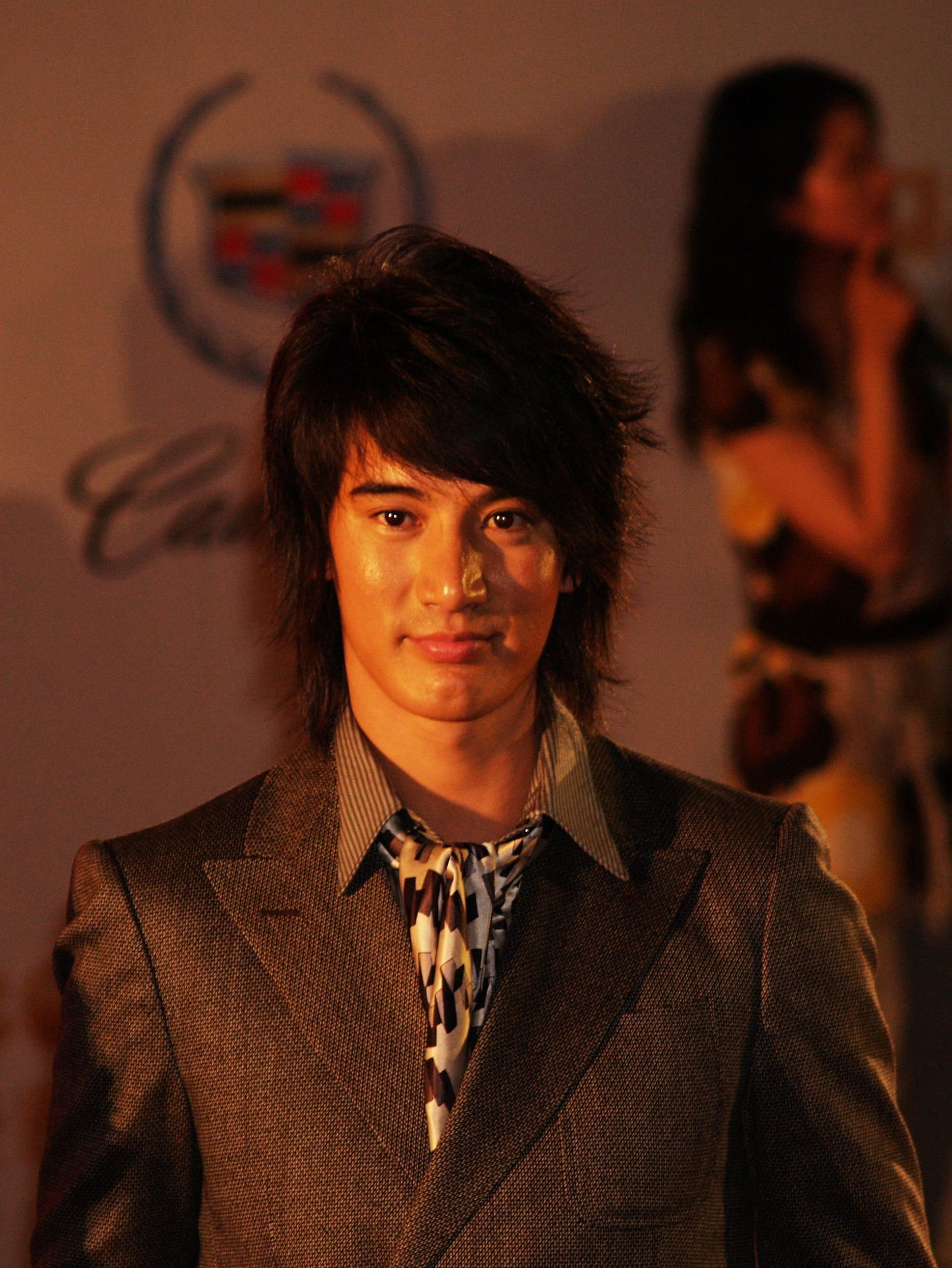
- Purba Rgyal in 2007
- Born: July 8, 1985 (age 41); Jinchuan County, Ngawa Tibetan and Qiang Autonomous Prefecture, Sichuan, China
- Education: Shanghai Theatre Academy
- Occupations: Actor, singer
- Years active: 2006–present
- Notable work: Heroes of Sui and Tang Dynasties; Prince of the Himalaya

Purba Rgyal (Tibetan: ཕུར་པ་སྐྱབས།, Wylie: phurpa skyabs; born July 8, 1985), also known as Pu Bajia (Chinese: 蒲巴甲; pinyin: Pú Bājiǎ), is a Chinese singer and actor of Tibetan ethnicity.

== Life ==
=== Early life ===
Purba Rgyal was born on July 8, 1985, in Jinchuan County, Ngawa Tibetan and Qiang Autonomous Prefecture, Sichuan province. In 2007 he graduated from Shanghai Theatre Academy, majoring in acting.

=== Career ===
During his university period, he began participating in entertainment programs.

On August 26, 2006, Purba Rgyal won the championship in Dragon Television's Come On! Good Guys!.

For his role as Rameau Laudun in Prince of the Himalaya, he won a Golden Angel Award at the 3rd Los Angeles International Film Festival in 2007, and a Best Actor Award at the 6th Monaco International Film Festival in 2008.

His debut solo album, Love Is So Simple, was released on December 15, 2008.

== Personal life ==
In February 2018, Purba Rgyal got engaged to actress Liang Jie. But in May 2021 they had announced their peaceful breakup.

== Filmography ==
=== Film ===
Year	English title	Chinese title	Role	Notes
2006	Prince of the Himalaya	喜马拉雅王子	Rameau Laudun	
2010	East Wind Rain	东风雨	A Sang	
2010	A Tibetan Love Song	新康定情歌	Zhaxi Dorje	
2012	The Guillotines	血滴子	Chen Tai	
2012	Million Dollar Crocodile	百万巨鳄	Zhou Xiao'ou	
2013	Zero Point Five Love	0.5的爱情	Chen Zihao	
2013		4B青年之4楼B座	Fen Dou	
2013	The Deadly Bullet	刺夜	Xu Jiyuan	
2013	To Love God	爱神来了	Li Liran	
2014	Face Hunter	虐面人	Lin Haowen	
2014	Letter of Tour	信之旅		
2015	Dream Holiday	梦幻佳期		
2016	Xuan Zang	大唐玄奘		
2017	All My Goddess			

=== Television ===
Year	English title	Chinese title	Role	Notes
2009	The War in Beijing	战北平	Qiao Zhensan	
2009	Ghost Catcher - Legend of Beauty Zhongkui	天师钟馗之美丽传说	Lü Dongbin	
2010	The Fifth Space	第五空间	Jiang Dou	
2011	The Holy Pearl	女娲传说之灵珠	Wen Tian	
2012		乌龙山剿匪记	Liu Yutang	
2012	Heroes of Sui and Tang Dynasties	隋唐英雄	Qin Qiong	
2013	Tibet Secret	西藏秘密	Jianse	
2014	Earth God and Earth Grandmother	土地公土地婆	Liu Jia	
2014		十送红军	Li Fusheng	
2014	Love of Life	情定三生	Xiang Tian	
2014	Sunrise Jiangshan Power Boat of Dream	大国船梦	Tai Jiye	
2014	The First Parachute Team	第一伞兵队	Cui Zhicheng	
2021	The Rebel Princess	上阳赋	Ma Zilü	

== Discography ==
=== Studio album ===
#	English title	Chinese title	Released	Label	Notes
1st	Love Is So Simple	爱就是那样简单	15 December 2008	Gold Typhoon	

=== Singles ===
English title	Chinese title	Released	Label	Notes
"Yimeng"	忆梦	15 July 2013		
"God's love"	天籁之爱	20 June 2013		
"Always Love You"	爱到万年	27 December 2012		
"Running Heaven"	奔跑天堂	November 2012		
"The Beauty of Amnesia."	失忆的美	February 2012		
"Beautiful Mountains and Rivers"	金色山川	December 2007		
	世界有你有我	August 2007		

== Film and TV awards ==
Year	Award	Category	Result	Notes
2007	3rd Los Angeles International Film Festival	Golden Angel Award	Won	
2008	6th Monaco International Film Festival	Best Actor Award	Won	
2011	Film Performance Art Academy Award	Best New Person	Won	
2013	Beijing International Micro Film Festival Festival	Best New Director	Won	
2019	6th The Actors of China Award Ceremony	Best Actor (Emerald category)	Nominated	

== Music awards ==
Year	Award	Category	Result	Notes
2009	Dongfang Fengyunbang - Chinese Top Ten Award	Top 10 Songs	Won	
2009	National Outstanding Popular Song Original Contest	3rd place	Won	
