= Che Yongli =

Chinese actress

- Born: January 28, 1980 (age 46); Chengdu, Sichuan, China
- Education: Central Academy of Drama
- Occupation: Actress
- Years active: 2004 - present
- Notable work: All For Love; A Singing Fairy; The Founding of a Republic

Chinese name
- Traditional Chinese: 車永莉
- Simplified Chinese: 车永莉
Transcriptions
Standard Mandarin
- Hanyu Pinyin: Chē Yǒnglì

Che Yongli (born 28 January 1980) is a Chinese actress.

She is noted for her roles as A Mei and Mei Ling in the films A Singing Fairy and All For Love respectively.

== Life ==
=== Early life ===
Che was born and raised in Chengdu, Sichuan, she graduated from Central Academy of Drama, majoring in acting.

=== Acting career ===
Che had her first experience in front of the camera in 2004, and she was chosen to act as a support actor in Hero Legend of Leifeng Temple.

In 2006, Che acted with Huang Shengyi and Zhong Xinghuo in Flying Sword, for which she won the Best Newcomer Award at the 11th Golden Phoenix Awards. At the same year, she also acted with Eric Tsang in Huizhou Hongling.

In 2007, Che had a cameo appearance in Call for Love and Crossed Lines.

In 2008, Che starred in Penicillin 1944, which propelled her to become one of the most famous actresses in China. She earned Best Actress Award at the Moscow International Film Festival, and she was nominated for the Best Actress Award at the Shanghai International Film Festival.

In 2009, Che had a minor role in The Founding of a Republic, a historical film starring Tang Guoqiang, Zhang Guoli, Chen Kun, Liu Jing, and Xu Qing. For her role as A Mei in A Singing Fairy, Che was nominated for the Best Supporting Actress Award at the Macau International Movie Festival.

In 2010, Che won the Favorite TV Star Award at the 4th Huading Awards.

In 2013, Che participated in Switch, a Chinese-Hong Kong action film directed by Jay Sun and starring Andy Lau, Tong Dawei, Zhang Jingchu and Lin Chi-ling. That same year, Che won the Best Actress Award at the 8th Paris Chinese Film Festival for her performance in All For Love.

== Works ==
=== Film ===
Year	Chinese Title	Title	Role	Notes
2004	《雷峰塔英雄传》	Hero Legend of Leifeng Temple	Zhang Jinxiu	
2006	《天竺山传奇》	Legend of Tianzhu Mountain	Little Baihe	
2006	《徽州红伶》	Huizhou Hongling	Empress Dowager Cixi	
2006	《飞刀》	Flying Sword	He Hua	
2006	《浅蓝深蓝》	In the Blue	Da Wang's mother	
2007	《命运呼叫转移》	Crossed Lines		
2007	《爱情呼叫转移》	Call for Love	A Mei	
2008	《爱情呼叫转移2》	Call for Love 2	guest	
2008	《盘尼西林1944》	Penicillin 1944	Lin Xiaoya/ Lin Xiaoting	
2009	《建国大业》	The Founding of a Republic	A soldier	
2009	《雨打芭蕉》		Ou Miaojuan	
2010	《建党伟业》	The Founding of a Party	Lu Xiaoman	
2010	《寻找刘三姐》	A Singing Fairy	A Mei	
2011	《郭明义》	Guo Mingyi	The head nurse	
2011	《万有引力》		Tao Ran	
2011	《富春三居图》	Switch	Teacher	
2011	《大格局》	Big Setup	Wang Hairong	
2012	《三个未婚妈妈》	All For Love	Mei Ling	
2016		The Bombing		
2018		The Bravest Escort Group		
2019		Headlines		

=== Television ===
Year	Chinese Title	Title	Role	Notes
2007	《张大千》	Zhang Daqian	Zeng Qiongying	
2007	《光头美女》		Jiang Ranran	
2007	《家事如天》		Yang Hui	
2007	《乔省长和他的女儿们》		The second daughter	
2008	《闯关东2》		Cui Yu	
2009	《大营救》		Wen Siyu	
2009	《龙头岭》	Longtou Mountain	Ye Lin	
2009	《绿色卫士》		Lin Yuxuan	
2010	《谍变》	Spy Changes	Xiao Ziru	
2010	《暗红1936》		Wu Weihua	
2010	《绞杀1943》		Zhou Zhiqing	
2011	《工人大院》	Worker Compound	Yang Yuhuan	
2011	《平凡的岁月》	Ordinary Days	Wang Liping	
2011	《我和丈母娘的十年战争》	I and Mother-in-law's Ten Year War	Wu Yue	
2012	《风花雪月》	Lie to Love	Wen Ni	
2012	《捍卫者》	Defenders	Su Min	
2012	《商之痕》		Xia Ruoxi	
2013	《进城1949》	Wine City Dawn	Ye Ya'nan	
2013	《温暖的日子》	Warm Day	Gu Yanyan	
2020	Eternal Love of Dream		Qing Hua	

=== Drama ===
Year	Chinese Title	Title	Role	Notes
1995	《结伴同行》	Walk Together	Luo Ping	
	《空港故事》	The Story of Kongxiang	Mei Duo	
	《有一个美丽的地方》	A Beautiful Place	Ai Shasha	
	《自杀者》	The Suicide	Kleopatra	
	《为你喝彩》	Cheer for You	Zhu Di	

=== Sketch ===
Title	Chinese Title	Role	Notes
The Sunbird	《太阳鸟》		
	《哨所采访记》		
	《心理热线》		
Student-Teacher Love	《师生情》		
Autumn Rain	《秋雨》		
	《军嫂情》		
	《山里红》		
Under the Blue Sky	《同在一片蓝天下》		

== Awards ==
Year	Work	Award	Result	Notes
2007		National Film Award for The Annual New Actor	Won	
2007	Flying Sword	11th Golden Phoenix Award for Best Newcomer	Won	
2008	Penicillin 1944	Moscow International Film Festival - Best Actress	Won	
2008	Penicillin 1944	Shanghai International Film Festival - Best Actress	Nominated	
2009		Golden Phoenix Awards	Won	
2010		4th Huading Award for Favorite TV Star	Won	
2010	A Singing Fairy	Macau International Movie Festival - Best Supporting Actress	Nominated	
2013		MSN Fashion Party Award for Best Leaping Actress	Won	
2013	All For Love	8th Paris Chinese Film Festival - Best Actress	Won	
