= Northwest University of Political Science and Law =

Provincial public university in Xi'an, Shaanxi, China

- 西北政法大学
- Motto: 严谨 求实 文明 公正
- Type: Public university
- Established: 1937
- President: Yang Zongke (杨宗科)
- Students: 12,000
- Location: Xi'an, Shaanxi, China
- Website: www.nwupl.edu.cn

Northwest University of Political Science and Law
- Traditional Chinese: 西北政法大學
- Simplified Chinese: 西北政法大学
Transcriptions
Standard Mandarin
- Hanyu Pinyin: Xīběi Zhèngfǎ Dàxué

The Northwest University of Political Science and Law is a provincial public university in Xi'an, Shaanxi, China. It is affiliated with the Province of Shaanxi.

== Furthrt reading ==
- List of Chinese Higher Education Institutions — Ministry of Education
- Shaanxi Institutions Admitting International Students
- 陕西高校网址导航陕西大学名单（2008）
- 陕西本科普通高校名单
