= A Tibetan Love Song =

- Film poster
- Directed by: Jiang Ping
- Written by: Zhu Ping
- Produced by: Han Sanping
- Starring: Alec Su; Ju Wenpei; Purba Rgyal; Zhang Guangbei; Ariel Aisin-Gioro
- Cinematography: Chen Youliang; Long Shen Song
- Production company: China Film Group Corporation
- Release date: 5 November 2010 (China)
- Running time: 105 minutes
- Country: China
- Language: Mandarin

A Tibetan Love Song (Chinese: 康定情歌; pinyin: Kāngdìng Qínggē; lit. 'Love Song of Kangding') is a 2010 Chinese romance film directed by Jiang Ping and starring Alec Su, Ju Wenpei, Purba Rgyal, Zhang Guangbei, Ariel Aisin-Gioro, Lau Yiwei, Chen Daolin, and Yuan Wenting. It was released on 5 November 2010 in China.

== Cast ==
- Alec Su
- Ju Wenpei
- Purba Rgyal
- Zhang Guangbei
- Ariel Aisin-Gioro
- Lau Yiwei
- Chen Daolin
- Yuan Wenting

== See also ==
- Kangding Qingge
