= Ariel Aisin-Gioro =

Chinese actress (born 1983)

- 爱新觉罗·启星
- Born: 23 December 1983 (age 42); Daxing District, Beijing, China
- Education: Medium Dance School affiliated to Beijing Dance Academy; Beijing Film Academy
- Occupation: Actress
- Years active: 2007–present

Chinese name
- Traditional Chinese: 愛新覺羅·啟星
- Simplified Chinese: 爱新觉罗·启星
Transcriptions
Standard Mandarin
- Hanyu Pinyin: Àixīnjuéluó Qǐxīng

Ariel Aisin-Gioro (Chinese: 爱新觉罗·启星; born 23 December 1983) is a Chinese actress of Manchu ethnicity, remotely related to the ruling clan of the former Qing imperial dynasty, the Aisin Gioro clan.

She is noted for her roles as Gesang Meiduo and Jin Xiaohui in the films A Tibetan Love Song (2010) and My Yanming Days (2011) respectively.

== Biography ==
=== Ancestry ===
She is the 14th generation descendant of Nurhaci of the Aisin Gioro house, the last imperial dynasty during Qing China.

=== Early life ===
Aisin-Gioro was born and raised in Daxing District, Beijing, where she studied at the Middle School affiliated to Beijing Dance Academy. She graduated from Beijing Film Academy, majoring in acting.

=== Acting career ===
Aisin-Gioro's first film role was uncredited appearance in the film The Rainbow Connection (2005).

In 2006, she starred in the romantic comedy film Love in Macau, alongside Alex Fong and Stephy Tang. She was nominated for Best Actress Award at the 1st Macau International Movie Festival.

In 2008, she appeared in the film Fit Lover, a romantic film starring Alec Su and Karena Lam. She also participated in Looking for Jackie and A Singing Fairy.

In 2010, Aisin-Gioro starred opposite Alec Su in A Tibetan Love Song, she won the Best Newcomer Award at the 2nd Macau International Movie Festival and Golden Phoenix Awards, and Best New Artist Award at the Chinese American Film Festival.

In 2011, she had a cameo appearance in The Founding of a Party, for which she won the Golden Phoenix Award.

For her role as Jin Xiaohui in My Yanming Days, Aisin-Gioro won the Best Actress Award at the Australia Chinese Film Festival and China Image Film Festival.

== Filmography ==
=== Film ===
| Year | English Title | Chinese Title | Role | Notes |
|---|---|---|---|---|
| 2005 | The Rainbow Connection | 舞出彩虹 | Xiao Xin | |
| 2006 | Love in Macau | 濠情岁月 | Su Xin | |
| 2007 | | 古刹怪佛 | Ling'er | |
| 2007 | | 机密行动 | Su Li | |
| 2007 | Crazy in Love | 意乱情迷 | Hao Hao | |
| 2008 | Looking for Jackie | 寻找成龙 | The conductor | Guest |
| 2008 | | 无悔调查 | Feng Xin | |
| 2008 | Beijing 2008 | 北京2008 | guest | |
| 2008 | Fit Lover | 爱情呼叫转移2 | | |
| 2008 | A Singing Fairy | 寻找刘三姐 | A Juan | |
| 2009 | | 拒绝来访 | Gu Xianqi | |
| 2009 | | 炫舞天鹅 | Lu Ying | |
| 2010 | A Tibetan Love Song | 康定情歌 | Gesang Meiduo | |
| 2010 | | 濠河边上的女人 | Girl student | |
| 2011 | | 焰舞星空 | Tan Yi | |
| 2011 | My Yanming Days | 雁鸣湖之恋 | Jin Xiaohui | |
| 2011 | The Founding of a Party | 建党伟业 | guest | |
| 2012 | All for Love | 三个未婚妈妈 | Ye Xiaolan | |
| 2013 | Switch | 天机·富春山居图 | Princess | |
| 2016 | When We Were Young | 不朽的时光 | | |
| 2016 | See Your Voice | 看见你的声音 | Lu Lu | |
| 2018 | Air Strike | 大轰炸 | Magician | Guest |

=== Drama ===
- Love in the Old Summer Palace (圆明情深)

== Awards and nominations ==
| Year | Work | Award | Result | Ref. |
|---|---|---|---|---|
| 2009 | Love in Macau | Macau International Movie Festival - Best Actress | Nominated | |
| 2009 | A Tibetan Love Song | Golden Phoenix Award for Best Newcomer | Won | |
| 2010 | A Tibetan Love Song | Macau International Movie Festival - Best Newcomer | Won | |
| 2010 | A Tibetan Love Song | Gold Angel Award for Best New Artist | Won | |
| 2011 | The Founding of a Party | Golden Phoenix Award | Won | |
| 2012 | My Yanming Days | Australia Chinese Film Festival - Best Actress | Won | |
| 2012 | My Yanming Days | China Image Film Festival - Best Actress | Won | |
