= Golden Lotus Award for Best Documentary =

Annual Chinese film award

The Golden Lotus Award for Best Documentary (simplified Chinese: 金莲花奖最佳纪录片; traditional Chinese: 金蓮花獎最佳紀錄片) is an award for documentary films.

== Award winners and nominees ==
=== 2000s ===
==== 2009 (1st) ====
Year	Winner and nominees (English)	Winner and nominees (Chinese)	Director (English title)	Director (English title)
2009	HER story - Jeritan	《女移工》	He Yingxian	何颖贤

=== 2010s ===
==== 2010 (2nd) ====
Year	Winner and nominees (English)	Winner and nominees (Chinese)	Director (English title)	Director (English title)
2010	Saint and Sinner	《圣与罪》	Zhu Quanbin	朱全斌
2010	San Sheng You Xing	《三生有幸》	Wang Zhicheng	王志成
2010	The Roof	《屋顶》	Boris Grachevskiy	鲍里斯·格雷切夫斯基
2010	The Dream Never Sets	《日落大梦》	Wu Tairen	吴汰纴
2010	Boyi	《博弈》	Wang Qingren	王清仁
2010	Cross And Banner	《十字架和横幅》	Jurgen Ellinghaus	尤尔根·伊林哈斯

==== 2011 (3rd) ====
Year	Winner and nominees (English)	Winner and nominees (Chinese)	Director (English title)	Director (English title)
2011	Music World	《音乐天地》		
2011	Vision Practitioners	《那些在台北发生的事》	Sun Mimi	孙蜜蜜
2011	Pork Chop Bun with Coffee	《猪扒包搭咖啡》		
2011	Pier One	《一号码头》		

==== 2012 (4th) ====
Year	Winner and nominees (English)	Winner and nominees (Chinese)	Director (English title)	Director (English title)
2012	Life is Elsewhere	《浮村》	Huang Jiandong	黄建东

==== 2013 (5th) ====
Year	Winner and nominees (English)	Winner and nominees (Chinese)	Director (English title)	Director (English title)
2013	None	None	None	None

==== 2014 (6th) ====
Year	Winner and nominees (English)	Winner and nominees (Chinese)	Director (English title)	Director (English title)
2014	Sixiang	《四象》		

==== 2016 (8th) ====
Year	Winner and nominees (English)	Winner and nominees (Chinese)	Director (English title)	Director (English title)
2016	I Think I Draw	《童年画语》		
