= Chinese American Film Festival =

Annual film festival in California, US

- Location: Los Angeles, California, U.S.
- Founded: 2006
- Awards: Golden Angel
- Language: English, Chinese
- Website: cafilmfestival.org

Chinese American Film Festival
- Traditional Chinese: 中美電影節
- Simplified Chinese: 中美电影节
Transcriptions
Standard Mandarin
- Hanyu Pinyin: Zhōng Měi Diànyǐngjié

Chinese American Film Festival (CAFF) is an American film festival held every November since 2006 in California (with events in Los Angeles and San Francisco, previously also in San Diego). The Chinese American Television Festival (CATF) is held alongside the CCFF.

== History ==
In 2005, the Chinese American Film Festival was founded by EDI Media with the support of China's State Administration of Radio, Film and Television. It is the only film festival recognized by both Motion Picture Association of America and the State Administration of Press, Publication, Radio, Film and Television.

== 2018 ==
In 2018, the 14th annual Chinese American Film Festival was held in Los Angeles, California. On October 28 2018, a Welcome Banquet was held at the San Gabriel Hilton Hotel in San Gabriel, California.

On October 30, 2018, the Chinese American Film Festival opening ceremony was held at the Ricardo Montalan Theater in Hollywood, California. Winners include Chow Yun-fat, Li Bingbing, Kelsey Scott, Xu Lu, Byron Mann, and many others.
