= Ju Wenpei =

Chinese actress, composer and hostess (born 1975)

- 居文沛
- Born: September 6, 1975 (age 50); Chongqing, China
- Education: Shanghai Conservatory of Music
- Occupations: Actress, hostess, composer
- Years active: 1999–present
- Notable work: All For Love; A Tibetan Love Song
- Television: World Film Report

Ju Wenpei (Chinese: 居文沛; pinyin: Jū Wénpèi; born 6 September 1975) is a Chinese actress, composer and hostess.

She is noted for her roles as Xia Tian and Da Wa in the films Set Off (2008) and A Tibetan Love Song (2010) respectively.

== Life ==
=== Early life ===
Ju was born and raised in Chongqing. She entered Shanghai Conservatory of Music in 1985, majoring in music, where she graduated in 1999.

=== Career ===
After graduation, Ju became a hostess in ShangHai Education Television Station. Ju transferred to China Central Television in June 2001, she hosted the World Film Report.

Ju's first film role was uncredited appearance in the film No Dream Year (2007).

In 2008, Ju acted in Set Off, she received Macau International Movie Festival nomination for Best Best New Artist. The film also screened at the 2009 Tokyo International Film Festival and Shanghai University Student Film Festival.

Zhu's first major film role was as Da Wa in A Tibetan Love Song, she won the Best Actress Award at the Chinese American Film Festival, and was nominated for Macau International Movie Festival - Best Actress.

In 2011, Ju won the Golden Phoenix Award.

In 2012, Ju participated in Deng Enming's Childhood, for which she received Best Supporting Actress Award nomination at the Macau International Movie Festival.

== Filmography ==
=== Film ===
Year	English title	Chinese title	Role	Notes
2007	Amazing Detective Situ	侠侣探案之天阳迷案	Shi Yiwen	
2007	No Dream Year	无梦之年	Wu Mei	
2008	Set Off	即日启程	Xia Tian	
2009	Spy War Rose	谍战玫瑰	Shen An'na	
2009		旭东	guest	
2010	Deadly Will	囧探佳人	Yu Na	
2010	A Tibetan Love Song	康定情歌	Da Wa	
2010	Island Secret War	孤岛密战		
2011	The First President	第一大总统	Newspaper woman	
2011	Deng Enming's Childhood	少年邓恩铭		
2012	All For Love	三个未婚妈妈	Dong Aping	
2012	The Horse Whisperer	金毛犬段景柱	San Niang	
2013	Angry Kid	愤怒的小孩	The postwoman	
2019	Princess's Romance			

=== Television ===
Year	English title	Chinese title	Role	Notes
2000	The Sun Rise from East	日出东方	guest	
2001	My Girlfriends	我的三个女友	guest	
2001		似是故人来	guest	
2002	Rose Guest	玫瑰黑客	Chen Xin	
2002	Beyond Expected	出乎意料	Wen Ning	
2003	Love on Qin Island	琴岛之恋	guest	
2003	Black Golden Triangle	黑色金三角	Qi Jie	
2006	I Have Lover	我是有情人	Ouyang Yun	
2009	I am Liu Yuejin	我叫刘跃进	Qu Li	
2010	Deng Zihui	邓子恢	Chen Lan	

== Awards ==
Year	Work	Award	Result	Notes
2008		QQ Entertainment Award for Most Potential Movie Artist	Won	
2009		QQ Entertainment Award for Most Striding Artist	Won	
2009	Set Off	Macau International Movie Festival - Best New Artist	Nominated	
2010	A Tibetan Love Song	Macau International Movie Festival - Best Actress	Nominated	
2010	A Tibetan Love Song	Chinese American Film Festival - Best Actress	Won	
2011		Golden Phoenix Awards	Won	
2012	Deng Enming's Childhood	Macau International Movie Festival - Best Supporting Actress	Nominated	
