= A Singing Fairy =

- Traditional Chinese: 尋找劉三姐
- Simplified Chinese: 寻找刘三姐
- Hanyu Pinyin: Xúnzhǎo Liúsānjiě
- Directed by: Zhu Feng
- Written by: Wei Shui; Qi Xin; Song Yongjiang; Huang Keyun
- Produced by: Peng Gang; Zheng Jinhao
- Starring: Alec Su; Eva Huang; Wei Zongwan; Ariel Aisin-Gioro; Che Yongli
- Cinematography: Zhao Yonghua
- Edited by: Yu Guangtong
- Music by: Su Cong; Liu Sijun
- Production companies: Guangxi Film Studio; CCTC-6
- Distributed by: China Film Group Corporation
- Release date: April 30, 2010 (China)
- Running time: 88 minutes
- Country: China
- Language: Mandarin

A Singing Fairy is a 2010 Chinese romantic comedy film directed by Zhu Feng and produced by Peng Gang and Zheng Jinhao, starring Alec Su, Eva Huang, Wei Zongwan, Ariel Aisin-Gioro, and Che Yongli. It based on the story of the classic Chinese figure Liu Sanjie. A Singing Fairy was first released in China on 30 April 2010.

== Plot ==
It tells the story of the Chinese-American musician Wei Wende and a Chinese ethnic minority women Liu Tiantian's marriage.

== Cast ==
- Alec Su as Wei Wende, a Chinese-American musician who fell in love with Liu Tiantian.
- Eva Huang as Liu Tiantian, a Chinese ethnic minority women.
- Wei Zongwan as Lao Mo.
- Ariel Aisin-Gioro as A Juan.
- Che Yongli as A Mei, the tour guide.
- Qian Liuyin as A Yan.
- Guan Zongxiang as Wei Wende's grandpa.
- Guo Le as A Li.
- Chen Jing as A Juan's grandpa.
- Calvin Sun as A Liang.

== Music ==
- Alec Su, Eva Huang - A Singing Fairy

== Production ==
The movie was filmed in Guilin, Yizhou, and Luocheng.

== Released ==
The film premiered in Beijing on 24 April 2010.

The film was a box-office and critical dud.
