= Alec Su =

Taiwanese actor, singer and director

- 蘇有朋
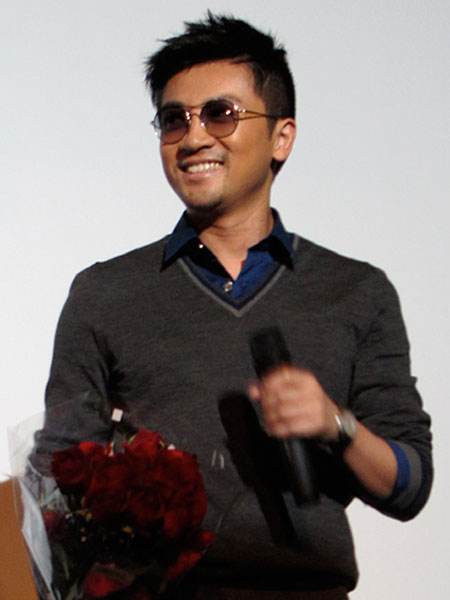
- Su in 2010
- Born: 11 September 1973 (age 52); Taipei, Taiwan
- Education: Taipei Municipal Chien Kuo High School
- Occupations: Actor; Singer; Producer; Director
- Years active: 1988–present
- Awards: Hundred Flowers Awards – Best Supporting Actor; 2010 The Message

Chinese name
- Traditional Chinese: 蘇有朋
- Simplified Chinese: 苏有朋
Transcriptions
Standard Mandarin
- Hanyu Pinyin: Sū Yǒupéng
- Musical career
- Also known as: Guaiguai Hu (乖乖虎; "Obedient Tiger"); Tommy Su
- Instruments: Vocals; keyboards; guitar
- Formerly of: Xiao Hu Dui

Alec Su You-peng (Chinese: 蘇有朋; pinyin: Sū Yǒupéng; born 11 September 1973) is a Taiwanese actor and singer.

Su became a teen idol in the 1980s as a member of the boyband Little Tigers. After the megahit TV series My Fair Princess (1998–1999), he has had a successful career in acting, starring in dramas such as The Legendary Siblings (1999), Romance in the Rain (2001), and The Heaven Sword and Dragon Saber (2003). Su has won awards from Hundred Flowers Awards and Macau International Movie Festival for the films The Message (2009) and A Tibetan Love Song (2010), respectively. He also produced the TV series Destiny by Love (2013) and directed the film The Left Ear (2015).

== Career ==
=== Musical: Xiao Hu Dui (Little Tigers) ===
Alec Su's career started in 1988, at the age of 15, when he joined Little Tigers. The band was the first idol singing group that debuted in the Taiwanese music industry and Alec was labelled as the "cute tiger." The group's popularity was unprecedented; the Little Tigers attracted fans from Taiwan, Hong Kong, China, Singapore, and amongst Chinese communities around the world. The success of the band began the new generation of Taiwanese pop culture in the early 1990s. In 2010, the Little Tigers were invited to participate in the CCTV Spring Festival Gala, in which they sang a medley of three of their biggest hits and won accolades as the "favorite singing group" for the event.

Apart from being a popular singer, during this period Su was epitomized by the general public as a superior student. He attended Taiwan's number one high school, Taipei Municipal Jianguo High School and was accepted into the prestigious National Taiwan University, where he majored in Mechanical Engineering. Su's experiences describing his high school years, preparing for the Taiwan university entrance examinations while trying to also juggle his performing schedule as a member of a wildly popular singing group, are recorded in his 1995 book entitled My Days at Jian Zhong / Youth Never Die.

However, as Su became so well known at such a young age, he felt that he had lost his freedom as a result of being in the limelight. At the age of 21, a year before his university graduation in Taiwan, Su decided to leave school and study abroad in England.

=== Television ===
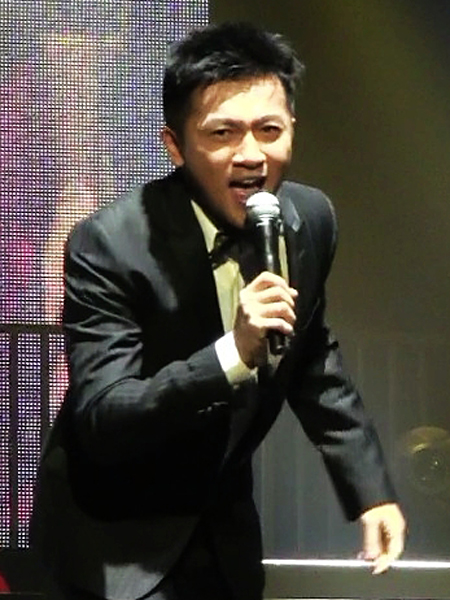
Su performing in Las Vegas, USA, 2012.

In 1995, after the breakup of Little Tigers, Su embarked on an acting career. His role as the Wu Ah Ge, Yongqi in the Chinese TV series blockbuster My Fair Princess I and II won him fame as a television actor in 1997. He continued in 2000 with another hit TV series Romance in the Rain. His later TV series include Heavenly Sword and Dragon Sabre (2002), Magic Touch of Fate (2004, costarring Taiwanese actress Ruby Lin and Korean singer Kang Ta), and Mischievous Princess (2005). He collaborated with Korean actress Chae Rim in two 2003 productions, Love of the Aegean Sea and Warriors of the Yang Clan.

In 2006, Su appeared in the 1930s drama Jiang Ji Jiu Ji co-starring with Li Qian, Cecilia Ye Tong, and Paul Chun, and which aired in Spring 2007. In 2008 he acted in the TV drama Re Ai, which aired in the spring of 2009.

In 2013–2014, Su was one of the judges on the fifth season of China's Got Talent alongside Liu Ye, Wang Wei-Chung, and former co-star Zhao Wei.

=== Film ===
In recent years, Su has been concentrating on his film career. Since the second half of 2008 he has participated in more than a half-dozen film projects. Su also appears in the ensemble piece, Fit Lover, which had a November 2008 release, as well as guest starring in a short Taiwan film, L-O-V-E, had a wide release in Asia in autumn 2009, has been included in several international film festivals, and received several nominations (and one win, for Li Bing Bing as "Best Actress") for the 2009 Golden Horse awards. A Singing Fairy, shot in Guangxi Province, and a biography of Macau composer Xian Xinghai, titled The Star and the Sea, both opened in limited release in December 2009. The Four Cupids, a romantic comedy, premiered in April 2010. Film projects for 2010 included A Tibetan Love Song (romantic drama filmed in Tibetan Autonomous Prefecture) and Lost in Panic Room, a "locked room" detective thriller. Both premiered in the fall of 2010. A sequel to the detective film, titled Lost in Panic Cruise, was released for Halloween 2011. Su continues his film career with several completed movies scheduled for release in 2012, and another currently in production.

In October 2010, Alec won the Hundred Flowers Award for "Best Supporting Actor" for his role in The Message. In December 2010, he won the "Best Actor" award at the 2nd Macau International Movie Festival, for his performance in A Tibetan Love Song

Along with his TV and film success, Su has released thirty top-selling albums, starting as a member of The Little Tigers group. As a solo artist he has released 14 albums, beginning in 1992 to his 2004 release Before and After. In January 2012 Su performed, along with singers Daniel Chan, Aska Yang, and Will Pan, in the 2012 Fantasy Stars Chinese New Year Concert, MGM Grand Garden Arena, Las Vegas.

In April 2017, Su announced a business partnership in the Beijing film industry with Vicki Zhao.

== Filmography ==
=== Television series ===
Year	English title	Mandarin title	Role	Notes
1991	The Hen Brought The Ducklings	母鸡带小鸭 - Mu Ji Dai Xiao Ya	梁志朋 - Liang Zhipeng	
1995	Idol Level Best	偶像一级棒 - Ou Xiang Yi Ji Bang	苏建雄 - Su Jianxiong	
1997	My Fair Princess I	还珠格格I - Huan Zhu Ge Ge I	永琪 - Yong Qi	
1998	My Fair Princess II	还珠格格II - Huan Zhu Ge Ge II	永琪 - Yong Qi	
1998	Old House Has Joy	老房有喜 - Lao Fang You Xi and Cousin Ji Xiang	苏小鹏 - Su Xiao Peng	
1999	The Legendary Twins	绝代双骄 - Jue Dai Shuang Jiao	花無缺 - Hua Wu Que	1999 version
2000	Romance in the Rain	情深深雨蒙蒙 - Qing Shen Shen Yu Meng Meng	杜飞 - Du Fei	
2001	Taiji Prodigy	少年张三丰 - Shao nian Zhang San Feng	易天行 - Yi Tian Xing	
2001	A Date with Youth	相约青春 - Xiang Yue Qin Chun	敬涛 - Jing Tao	
2001	Secret Murder, Amazing Cases	无敌县令 - Wu Di Xian Ling or Pai An Jing Qi	杭铁生 - Han Tie Sheng	
2002	Heavenly Sword and Dragon Saber	倚天屠龙记 - Yi Tian Tu Long Ji	张无忌 - Zhang Wu Ji & 张翠山 - Zhang Cuishan	
2002	The Legendary Siblings 2	絕世雙驕	Hua Wuque (guest star)	
2003	Love Train	心动列车 - Xin Dong Lie Che	阿晃 - A Huang	
2003	Love of the Aegean Sea	情定爱琴海 - Qing Ding Ai Qin Hai	陆恩祈 - Lu En Qi	
2003	Warriors of the Yang Clan	杨门虎将 - Yang Men Hu Jiang	杨延郎 - Yang Yan Lang (Yang Si Lang)	
2004	Magic Touch of Fate	魔术奇缘 - Mo Shu Qi Yuan	吴俊安 - Wu Jun An	
2005	The Mischievous Princess (My Bratty Princess)	刁蛮公主 - Diao Man Gong Zhu	朱允 - Zhu Yun	
2006	Entrapment	将计就计 - Jiang Ji Jiu Ji	庄若龙 - Zhuang Ruo Long	
2009	Passion	熱愛 - Re Ai	苏明涛 - Su Ming Tao	formerly called 大镇反 - Da Zhen Fan
2013	The Demi-Gods and Semi-Devils	天龍八部 - Tian Long Ba Bu	無崖子 - Wuyazi	Guest Star
2013	Destiny by Love	非緣勿擾	Lu Xinuo	Producing debut

=== Film ===
==== As actor ====
Year	English title	Mandarin title	Role	Notes
1990	Wandering Heroes	游侠儿 - You Xia Er	Xiao Guai	
1995	Forever Friends	四个不平凡的少年 - Si Ge Bu Ping Fan De Shao Nian	Luo Zhi Jian	
1996	Flirting Expert	泡妞专家 - Pao Niu Zhuan Jia	Xiao Pei	
1996	Pale Sun	情色 - Qing Se	Lao Wu	
1998	Red Bride	红娘 - Hong Niang	Zhang Jun Rui	
1999	Winner Takes All	大赢家 - Da Ying Jia	Shi Sheng Zi	
1999	Cotton Fleece	白棉花 - Bai Mian Hua	Ma Cheng Gong	
2000	Devoted to You	初恋的故事 - Chu Lian De Gu Shi	Yu Hai	
2002	Reunion	手足情深 - Shou Zu Qing Shen	Ka Chung	
2003	Grandpa's Home	爷爷的家 - Ye Ye De Jia	Xin Qiang Gong An	
2005	Taklamakan	塔克拉玛干 - TaKeLaMaGan	Cheng Cheng (成成)	
2008	Fit Lover	爱情呼叫转移II:爱情左右 - Ai Qing Hu Jiao Zhuan Yi II: Ai Qing Zuo You	Guo Ying (郭影)	
2009	L-O-V-E	爱到底 - Ai Dao Di		Guest Star
2009	A Singing Fairy	寻找刘三姐 - Xun Zhao Liu San Jie	Wei Wende (韦文德)	
2009	The Message	风声 - Feng Sheng	Bai Xiaonian (白小年)	aka "Sound of the Wind"
2009	The Star and the Sea	星海 - Xinghai	Xiao Youmei (萧友梅)	aka "The Musician"
2010	The Four Cupids	四个丘比特 - Si Ge Qiu Bi Te	Qi Bolin (齐泊霖)	
2010	Secret Battleground	孤岛秘密战 - Gu Dao Mi Mi Zhan	Japanese Officer	
2010	A Tibetan Love Song	康定情歌 - Kang Ding Qing Ge	Li Su Jie	aka "A Tibetan Love Song"
2010	Lost in Panic Room	密室之不可告人 - Mi Shi Zi Bu Ke Gao Ren	Liu Feiyun (柳飞云)	
2011	Deng Enming's Childhood	少年邓恩铭 - Shao Nian Deng En Ming		
2011	Lost in Panic Cruise	密室之不可靠岸 - Mi Shi Zhi Bu Ke Kao An	Liu Feiyun (柳飞云)	sequel to "Lost in Panic Room"
2012	Design of Death	杀生 - Sha Sheng	Longevity Town Doctor	previous title: 长寿镇 - Chang Shou Zhen
2012	The Assassins	铜雀台 - Tong Que Tai	Emperor Xian of Han	alt pinyin: Tong Qiao Tai, previous English title: "Bronze Swallow Terrace"
2012	Back to 1942	一九四二 - Yi Jiu Si Er	T. V. Soong	Scenes all deleted
2012	Three Unmarried Mothers	三个未婚妈妈 - San Ge Wei Hun Ma Ma		
2014	Sweet Alibis	甜蜜殺機	王志毅 - Wang Zhi Yi	
2014	The Suspicious	最佳嫌疑人	Lin Yitai	
2014	The Four III	四大名捕3	Emperor Huizong of Song	

==== As director ====
Year	English title	Mandarin title	Notes
2015	The Left Ear	左耳	
2016	Dama Wang Who Lives on Happiness Avenue	住在幸福大街的王大妈	Micro Movie
2017	The Devotion of Suspect X	嫌疑人X的献身	

=== Variety and reality show ===
Year	English title	Chinese title	Notes
2013	China's Got Talent Season 5	中国达人秀 5	Judge
2016	Hidden Singer	谁是大歌神	Guessing Celebrity Team Member
2017	I Want to Meet You Season 1	我想见到你	Team Leader
2018	Chinese Restaurant Season 2	中餐厅 2	Restaurant Team Member
2019	Produce Camp 2019	创造营2019	Mentor (Class F)
2019	The Partner	音浪合伙人 (第一期）	音浪召集人
2020	The Treasured Voice Season 1	天赐的声音	Mentor
2022	Great Dance Crew	了不起舞社	President 社长
2022	Call Me by Fire Season 2	披荊斬棘	年度总冠军
2025	Infinity and Beyond : Mandopop Season 5	声生不息·华流季 第五季	榜样力量奖

== Discography ==
=== Albums ===
Released Year	English Title	Mandarin Title	Notes
1992	我只要你愛我	I Only Want You to Love Me	
1993	等到那一天	Wait Until That Day	
1994	背包	Cherished Backpack	
1994	傷口	Wound	
1994	這般發生	Happens This Way	
1994	擦肩而過	Brushing Past	
1995	愛上你的一切事情	In Love with Everything about You	
1995	走	Go	
1995	風聲雨聲聽蘇聲	Wind Sound Rain Sound Su Sound	
2000	你快不快樂	Are You Happy or Not	
2000	了解	Understanding	
2001	不只深情	Not Only Deep Love	
2002	玩真的	Playing for Real / Earnest	
2002	最愛1992-2002	Best Love 1992-2002	
2004	以前以後	Before and After	

=== Soundtrack appearances ===
- 2004: Love of the Aegean Sea original soundtrack

== Awards and nominations ==
Year	Award	Category	Nominated work	Notes/Ref.
2010	Hundred Flowers Awards	Best Supporting Actor	The Message	Winner
2010	Golden Lotus Awards	Best Actor	A Tibetan Love Song	Winner
2011	Golden Phoenix Awards	Special Jury Award		Winner
2015	Golden Horse Award	Best New Director	The Left Ear	Nominee
2016	Audience Award	Favorite Director	The Left Ear	Beijing College Student Film Festival

== Bibliography ==
- 1995 (revised 2003): 青春的場所 (My Days at Jian Zhong / Youth Never Die)
