= List of Hong Kong films of 2012 =

This article lists feature-length Hong Kong films released in 2012.

== Box office ==
The highest-grossing Hong Kong films released in 2012 by domestic box office gross revenue, are as follows:

Highest-grossing films released in 2012
Rank	Title	Domestic gross
1	Cold War	HK$42,820,819
2	Vulgaria	HK$30,069,986
3	Love in the Buff	HK$27,974,902
4	A Simple Life	HK$27,873,690
5	The Viral Factor	HK$22,212,450
6	Due West: Our Sex Journey	HK$19,252,862
7	I Love Hong Kong 2012	HK$19,127,350
8	Nightfall	HK$17,729,513
9	Motorway	HK$14,766,493
10	All's Well, Ends Well 2012	HK$12,105,232

== Releases ==
Title	Director	Cast	Genre	Notes
All's Well, Ends Well 2012	Chan Hing-ka; Janet Chun	Donnie Yen, Louis Koo, Sandra Ng, Raymond Wong, Kelly Chen, Yang Mi, Chapman To, Yan Ni, Lynn Hung	Comedy / Romance	In theaters 19 January 2012
The Bounty	Fung Chih-chiang	Chapman To, Fiona Sit, Alex Man	Comedy	In theaters 21 June 2012
The Bullet Vanishes	Law Chi-leung	Nicholas Tse, Lau Ching Wan, Yang Mi, Liu Kai-chi, Wu Gang, Jing Boran	Action / Mystery	In theaters 13 September 2012
Cold War	Sunny Luk; Longmond Leung	Aaron Kwok, Tony Leung Ka-fai, Andy Lau, Charlie Yeung, Chin Kar-lok, Andy On, Lam Ka-tung, Aarif Rahman, Peng Yuyan	Action / Crime	In theaters 8 November 2012
Cross	Daniel Chan	Simon Yam, Kenny Wong, Liu Kai-chi, Mini Kung, Nick Cheung, Pal Sinn, Evelyn Choi	Crime / Thriller	In theaters 4 October 2012
CZ12	Jackie Chan	Jackie Chan	Martial Arts / Action / Adventure	In theaters 12 December 2012
Diva	Heiward Mak	Joey Yung, Chapman To, Hu Ge, Mag Lam	Romance	In theaters 16 August 2012
Drug War	Johnnie To	Louis Koo, Sun Honglei, Huang Yi, Michelle Ye	Crime thriller	Entered into the 2012 Rome International Film Festival; In theaters 18 April 2013
Due West: Our Sex Journey	Mark Wu	Justin Cheung, Gregory Wong, Celia Kwok, Jeana Ho, Daniella Wang, Mo Qiwen, Jessica Kizaki, Eva Li, Wylien Chiu, Angelina Cheung, Tony Ho, Ng Lai-chu, Tin Kai-man, Polly Leung, Wong Oi-ming	Romance / Erotica	In theaters 20 September 2012
The Fairy Tale Killer	Pang brothers	Lau Ching Wan, Wang Baoqiang, Elanne Kong, Joey Meng, Ken Lo	Horror / Thriller	In theaters 10 May 2012
The Great Magician	Derek Yee	Tony Leung Chiu-Wai, Lau Ching Wan, Zhou Xun, Ambrose Hsu, Jackie Chan, Yan Ni, Alex Fong	Action / Fantasy	In theaters 12 January 2012
The Guillotines	Andrew Lau	Huang Xiaoming, Ethan Juan, Shawn Yue, Li Yuchun, Jing Boran	Action	In theaters 27 December 2012
Lan Kwai Fong 2	Wilson Chin	Shiga Lin, Kelvin Kwan, Mia Chan, Avis Chan, Sammy Sum, Sita Chan, Jaime Fong, Tatyana B	Romance / Erotica	In theaters 23 August 2012
The Last Tycoon	Wong Jing	Chow Yun-fat, Sammo Hung, Francis Ng, Huang Xiaoming	Action / Crime	In theaters 3 January 2013
I Love Hong Kong 2012	Chung Shu Kai; Chin Kwok Wai	Eric Tsang, Teresa Mo, Bosco Wong, Denise Ho, Stanley Fung, Siu Yam-yam. William So, Mak Cheung-ching, 6-Wing, Vivian Zhang	Comedy	In theaters 21 January 2012
Lives in Flames	Jacky Lee	Mr., Mag Lam, Alex Lam, Michelle Wai, Jeana Ho, Bonnie Xian, Michael Chan	Romance / Music	In theaters 12 April 2012
Love in the Buff	Pang Ho-cheung	Shawn Yue, Miriam Yeung, Xu Zheng, Yang Mi, Huang Xiaoming	Romantic comedy	In theaters 29 March 2012
Love in Time	Lee Ka-wing	Bosco Wong, Stephy Tang, Sammy Leung, Sita Chan, Danny Chung, Zhao Ke	Romance / Drama	In theaters 22 November 2012
Love is... Pyjamas	Vincent Kok	Ronald Cheng, Teresa Mo, Raymond Lam, Lynn Hung, Karena Ng, Raymond Wong	Romantic comedy	In theaters 11 October 2012
Love Lifting	Herman Yau	Chapman To, Elanne Kong	Romance / Drama	In theaters 22 March 2012
Motorway	Soi Cheang	Shawn Yue, Anthony Wong	Action / Crime	In theaters 21 June 2012
Mr. and Mrs. Gambler	Wong Jing	Chapman To, Fiona Sit, Elena Kong	Comedy	In theaters 16 February 2012
My Sassy Hubby	James Yuen	Ekin Cheng, Charlene Choi	Comedy	In theaters 6 December 2012
Naked Soldier	Marco Mak	Sammo Hung, Jennifer Tse, Jiang Luxia, Philip Ng, Andy On, Ian Powers	Action	In theaters 23 August 2012
Natural Born Lovers	Patrick Kong	Julian Cheung, Annie Liu	Romance / Comedy	In theaters 25 October 2012
Nightfall	Roy Chow	Simon Yam, Nick Cheung, Kay Tse, Janice Man, Shawn Dou, Michael Wong	Action / Crime	In theaters 15 March 2012
Repeat, I Love You	Calvin Poon	Cecilia Cheung, Kwon Sang-woo, Tien Niu, Sphinx Ting, Jing Boran, Jing Tian, Ng Man-tat	Romance	In theaters 24 May 2012
Romancing in Thin Air	Johnnie To	Louis Koo, Gao Yuanyuan, Sammi Cheng, Huang Yi, Wang Baoqiang, Wilfred Lau	Romance	In theaters 9 February 2012
The Second Woman	Lai Miu-suet	Shawn Yue, Shu Qi	Horror	In theaters 22 March 2012
The Silent War	Alan Mak; Felix Chong	Tony Leung Chiu-Wai, Zhou Xun, Mavis Fan, Wang Xuebing, Dong Yong	Drama / Mystery	In theaters 10 August 2012
Speechless	Simon Chung	Pierre-Matthieu Vital, Qilun Gao, Yung Yung Yu	Mystery	In theaters August 2012
Triad	Daniel Chan	William Chan, Patrick Tam, Michelle Wai, Irene Wan, Derek Tsang, Michael Chan	Action	In theaters 15 November 2012
Wu Dang	Patrick Leung	Vincent Zhao, Louis Fan, Yang Mi	Martial Arts	In theaters 17 July 2012
The Viral Factor	Dante Lam	Jay Chou, Nicholas Tse, Bai Bing, Andy On	Action / Adventure	In theaters 17 January 2012
Vulgaria	Pang Ho-cheung	Chapman To, Fiona Sit, Ronald Cheng, Dada Chan	Comedy	In theaters 9 August 2012
