= List of Chinese films of 2012 =

The following is a list of mainland Chinese films first released in year 2012. There were 231 Chinese feature films released in China in 2012.

== Box office ==
These are the top 10 grossing Chinese films that were released in China in 2012:

Highest-grossing domestic films of 2012 in China
Rank	Title	Domestic gross
1	Lost in Thailand	$208,000,000
2	CZ12	$145,000,000
3	Painted Skin: The Resurrection	$117,000,000
4	Back to 1942	$57,450,000
5	Cold War	$39,620,000
6	The Silent War	$38,260,000
7	The Four	$31,060,000
8	Caught in the Web	$27,930,000
9	The Great Magician	$27,080,000
10	Mission Incredible: Adventures on the Dragon's Trail	$25,800,000

== Films released ==
=== January–March ===
Opening		Title	Director	Cast	Genre	Notes	Ref.
J A N U A R Y	5	Xi Jiu	Yi Weijun	Xiong Weili, Xiao Chu, Zhao Yiyang, Zong Xiao-jun	Comedy		
J A N U A R Y	6	Happy Adventure	Lee Tso-nam	Eddie Kwan, Theresa Lee	Action / Comedy		
J A N U A R Y	6	Run	Ke Lu	Chao Wu, Sun Xiaoxiao	Horror		
J A N U A R Y	11	The Monkey King: Uproar in Heaven	Da Su, Chen Zhi-hong	Li Yang, Yao Chen, Chen Peisi, Liu Xiaoqing, Chen Kaige, Feng Xiaogang, Chen Daoming, Zhang Guoli, Hu Ge, He Jiong, Zhou Libo, Liu Ye	Animation		
J A N U A R Y	12	Mission Incredible: Adventures on the Dragon's Trail	James Choo	Bibi Zhou, Ah Niu, O Ti	Animation		
J A N U A R Y	17	The Viral Factor	Dante Lam	Jay Chou, Nicholas Tse, Lin Peng, Bai Bing, Andy On, Liu Kai-chi, Carl Ng, Elaine Jin, Deep Ng, Crystal Lee, Sammy Hung, Patrick Keung	Action / Crime / Drama	Mainland-Hong Kong co-production	
J A N U A R Y	18	Qin Jia Guo Nian	Yip Wai-man	Wen Zhang, Liu Yun, Zhang Fengyi, Cong Shan, Cai Ming, Gong Jinghua, Li Xiaochuan	Comedy / Romance		
J A N U A R Y	23	Fan Ju Ye Feng Kuang	Shang Jing	Fan Wei, Huang Bo, Liu Hua, Monica Mok	Comedy / Drama		
J A N U A R Y	23	Just for Fun	Lu Weiguo	Li Yixiang, Yue Yun-peng, Tong Wang	Comedy		
J A N U A R Y	23	Little Heroes Legend of Yuefei	Zhu Zhaowei	Zhang Zhen, Ren Pengliang	Children's film / Comedy		
J A N U A R Y	23	Perfect Two	Kevin Chu	Vic Zhou, Ella Chen, Xiao Xiaobin	Romance / Comedy	Mainland-Taiwan co-production	
J A N U A R Y	24	Chao Shi Kong Jiu Bing	Lam Chi-chung	Wallace Huo, Jing Tian, Dylan Kuo, Lam Chi-chung	Comedy / Romance		
J A N U A R Y	24	Harpoon	Zhou Yaowu	Bing Hu, Monica Mok, Li Lingyu	Thriller / Mystery		
J A N U A R Y	25	Qi Ge Long Dong Qiang Dong Qiang	Zhao Han	Zhao Han, Yang Shaohua, Liu Yajin	Romance / Comedy		
J A N U A R Y	26	If I Were You	Li Qi	Jimmy Lin, Yao Di, Wu Ma	Romance / Comedy / Fantasy	Mainland-Taiwan co-production	
F E B R U A R Y	3	Bottom Line	Tao He	Guo Da, Guo Tao, Yuan Jing, Lili Liu	Drama / Mystery / Crime		
F E B R U A R Y	9	Romancing in Thin Air	Johnnie To	Louis Koo, Sammi Cheng, Gao Yuanyuan, Wang Baoqiang, Huang Yi, Li Guangjie, Wilfred Lau	Drama / Romance	Mainland-Hong Kong co-production	
F E B R U A R Y	10	I Do	Sun Zhou	Li Bingbing, Sun Honglei, Duan Yihong,	Romance		
F E B R U A R Y	10	Ye Dian Gui Tan	Fang Yaxi	Van Fan, Chrissie Chau, YiDA, Deng Jiajia, Qi Yuwu	Thriller / Drama		
F E B R U A R Y	13	Love	Doze Niu	Shu Qi, Zhao Wei, Ethan Juan, Mark Chao, Eddie Peng, Ivy Chen, Amber Kuo, Fan Liao, Lung Siu-wa, Meiren Yu, Doze Niu	Drama / Romance	Mainland-Taiwan co-production	
F E B R U A R Y	14	Truth or Dare	Ma Zhi-yu	Miao Pu, Huang Weide, Sun Xing, Zhou Yang, Wen Zhang, Lei Wei, Zhao Yang, Liu Hua, Meng Li, Qin Hailu	Comedy / Romance		
F E B R U A R Y	17	The Floating Shadow	Jia Dongshuo	Li Jia, Echo Shen, Jiang Wu, Zhang Weixin	Thriller		
F E B R U A R Y	24	Scheme with Me	Pan Anzi	Richie Ren, Teng Geer, Yvonne Yung, Steve Seungjun Yoo, Xiong Naijin	Western / Comedy / Adventure		
F E B R U A R Y	24	The Sword Identity	Xu Haofeng	Yu Cheng-hui, Song Yang, Zhao Yuanyuan, Ma Ke	Martial arts / Action / War / History		
M A R C H	1	Feng Kuang De Chun Zei	Li Kai	Francis Ng, Liu Ying, Lam Suet, Teddy Lin, Wang Taili, Peng Bo, Dong Lifan, Gao Jun, Na Wei	Romance / Crime / Comedy		
M A R C H	2	Nunchucks	Chen Tianxing	Chen Tianxing, Yu Yangfei	Action		
M A R C H	2	Qian Xue Sen	Zhang Jianya	Chen Kun, Zhang Yuqi, George Anton, Zhang Tielin, Lin Yongjian, You Yong, Liu Jin, Andrew Lin, Su Jin, Lv Xing, Wu Yue, Gan Yu, Zhang Enqi	Biography		
M A R C H	8	Jack of All Traces	Pi Jianxin	Wang Baoqiang, Eric Tsang, Cao Yiwen, Ge Lei	Romance / Comedy		
M A R C H	8	Liu Ru Shi	Gao Chang, Wu Qi	Wan Qian, Chin Han, Feng Shaofeng, Ling Feng	Romance / Drama		
M A R C H	8	The Locked Door	Zhao Zhiping, He Wenliang	Huang Shengyi, Yang Zi, Calvin Sun, Xu Songzi, Sun Tianyu, Li Man, Gao Jun	Drama / Romance		
M A R C H	8	The Second Woman	Lai Miu-suet	Shu Qi, Shawn Yue, Chen Shu, Xi Meijuan, Joe Easy, Niu Mengmeng	Romance / Drama / Mystery	Mainland-Hong Kong co-production	
M A R C H	9	Rhapsody of Marriage	Yang Langcong	Ady An, Lee Seung-hyun, Tang Jingmei, Cheung Lapp-wai, Wang Ye, Yang Lulu, Hong Jiantao, Shone An, Wong Yut-fei, Zhou Xiaoli	Romance		
M A R C H	9	The Somalia Truth	Lv Jianmin		Documentary		
M A R C H	13	Yang Wang Xing Kong	Chen Zhen		Drama / Biography		
M A R C H	16	Marrying Mr. Perfect	Wong Jing	Ronald Cheng, Gigi Leung, Chapman To, Eric Tsang, Cherrie Ying, Sandra Ng, Stanley Fung, Paw Hee-ching, Lam Chi-chung, Na Wei, Mao Junjie, Liu Yan, Su Xing, Miu Miu, Lau Yiwei, Xie Na	Comedy / Romance	Mainland-Hong Kong co-production	
M A R C H	20	You and Me	Hu Yaozhi	Ying Da, Jeff Chang, Tarcy Su, Qike, Hong Jiantao, Liu Jinshan, Gao Yalin, Jiang Chao, Liang Tian, Xue Jianing, Zhang Lingxin, Wang Qing, Li Xiulin, Ma Su, Chang Rong, Wu Yue, Li Qi, Li Jie, Liu Lei, Lv Hanbiao, Lian Shumei, Li Bin, Liu Zi, Li Mengnan, Yang Qing	Comedy		
M A R C H	23	The Bloody Marriage	Lu Jian	Dong Ping, Fu Chong, Yuen Chi-keung	Mystery / Thriller		
M A R C H	23	The Happy Kids Adventure	Guo Minger, Lei Tao	Renata Tan, Xu Jiawei, Liu Wei, Wu Ma, Zhang He, Cheung Lap-wai	Kids / Comedy		
M A R C H	23	Joyful Reunion	Tsao Juiyuan	Huo Siyan, Lan Zhenglong, Kenneth Tsang, Kuei Yalei, Joseph Chang, Huang Xuan, Jiang Mengjie, Li Qin, Yang Yang	Comedy / Romance	Mainland-Taiwan co-production	
M A R C H	23	Love on Gallery Bridge	Chen Li	Wu Hsing-kuo, Xu Shouli, David Chiang, Sun Weimin	Drama		
M A R C H	23	Tokyo Newcomer	Jiang Qinmin	Qin Hao, Hideo Nakaizumi, Baishou Chieko, Janine Chang, Tian Yuan, Hiroyuki Ikeuchi	Romance / Drama	Mainland-Taiwan-Japan co-production	
M A R C H	30	Everything is Nothing	Tao Mingxi	Lam Suet, Cheung Tat-ming, Liu Xin, Liu Xiaoye, Lam Chi-chung, Teddy Lin, Jiang Yimeng, Ba Duo, Tony Liu, Peng Lin, Shang Guowei, Liu Zhongfu, Du Shouming, You Fangming	Comedy	Mainland-Hong Kong co-production	
M A R C H	31	Blood Stained Shoes	Raymond Yip	Ruby Lin, Monica Mok, Ye Xiqi, Kara Hui, Michael Tong, Xing Minshan, Daniel Chan, Jing Gangshan, Daichi Harashima	Horror		
M A R C H	31	The Next Magic	Li Zhuo	Hao Qin, Monica Mok, Liu Shishi, Piao Xizhi, Tony Yang, Tong Jiankong, Lv Xiaolin, Shek Sau, Chang Kuo-chu	Romance / Drama	Mainland-Taiwan co-production	

=== April–June ===
Opening		Title	Director	Cast	Genre	Notes	Ref.
A P R I L	1	Just Try Me	Zhoa Xiaotong	Yang Tongshu, Mok Siu-chung, Hong Jiantao, Ji Bo, Liu Fengjiao, Guo Xiao, Wu Yanyan, Cheng Hui, Xia Yangyang, Du Du, Zhang Ying, Wamg Meng, Zhang Naiou, Zhao Yunheng, Li Jing, Ma Chao	Romance		
A P R I L	1	Snow Fall in Taipei	Huo Jianqi	Bolin Chen, Tong Yao, Tony Yang, Janel Cai, Mo Tzuyi, Ji Peihui, Jin Shijie, Wang Juan	Romance	Mainland-Japan-Taiwan-Hong Kong co-production	
A P R I L	1	The Unfortunate Car	Hua Yuan, Bao Jiming	Guo Degang, Ambrose Hui, Zhang Xinyu, Wang Yinan, Pan Changjiang, Yu Qian, Qu Ying, Zhou Xiaoou, Hou Zheng, Li Duoduo, Pan Binglong, Gao Jun, Gao Xin, Ding Dang, Lv Boxi	Comedy		
A P R I L	13	Huang Dao Qing Wei Liao	Yu Hanqiu	Johnny Chen, Dong Lai Dongwang, Cao Xiwen, Jiang Xiaohan, Ke Yan, Ren Jiarui, Chen Zheng, Qiao Dawei, Xu Xiyan, Cao Yuan	Thriller / Mystery		
A P R I L	13	Love on that Day	Zhu Shaoyu	Mario Maurer, Ye Qing, Philip Lau, Kan Qingzi, Gong Hanlin, Jin Zhu, Nie Jieming	Romance / Drama		
A P R I L	13	One Night to be Star	Shi Lei	Huang Shengyi, Vitas, Wa Tian, Liu Hua, Brenda Wang, Dong Meiwei, Carmen Masola, Susan Boyle	Drama / Musical		
A P R I L	19	I'm Chinese	Ricky Lau	Li Qianming, Yan Danchen, Zhang Yan, Liang Youlin, Lily Chow, KiKo, Wong Yut-fei	War		
A P R I L	23	An Inaccurate Memoir	Yang Shupeng	Huang Xiaoming, Zhang Yi, Zhang Xinyi, Wang Lie, Bao Tino, Ni Jingyang, Sun Lei, Zhang Yue, Gao Qunshu, Jiang Shan, Waise Lee, Liang Jing, Ma Zhiming	Drama / Action / War		
A P R I L	23	Guns and Roses	Ning Hao	Lei Jiayin, Tao Hong, Cheng Yuanyuan, Guo Tao, Fan Wei, Sun Chun, Liu Hua, Keiichi Yamasaki, Dong Lifan, Huang Bo, Wang Wen	Comedy / Action / Drama		
A P R I L	25	Taste of Body	Michelle Wang	Gao Yan Jinzi, Tere O'Connor	Documentary		
A P R I L	27	Camel Caravan	Gao Feng	Liu Xiaoning, Chen Xuzhu, Zhang Yulong, An Qihu	Action / Adventure / Romance		
A P R I L	27	Close to the Sun	Chouchou	Fan Xiaoyang, Gong Xuan, Mu Xiuwei	Drama		
J U N E	28	Painted Skin: The Resurrection	Wuershan	Zhou Xun, Chen Kun, Zhao Wei, Yang Mi, Feng Shaofeng, Fei Xiang, Chen Tingjia, Ke Tong	Fantasy		

=== July–September ===
Opening		Title	Director	Cast	Genre	Notes	Ref.
J U L Y	5	Legend of the Moles: The Treasure of Scylla	Liu Kexin	Huang Bo, Ji Guanlin, Xuan Xiaoming, Zhou Zhiqiang, Qiao Shiyu, Jin Feng, Zhang Kai, Zhang Jie	Animation / Action / Fantasy / Adventure		
J U L Y	6	Caught in the Web	Chen Kaige	Gao Yuanyuan, Yao Chen, Mark Chao, Chen Hong, Wang Xueqi, Wang Luodan, Chen Ran, Zhang Yi	Drama / Romance / Mystery		
J U L Y	6	Jia Wu Da Hai Zhan	Feng Xiaoning	Lu Yi, Yang Lixin, Xia Yu, Sun Haiyin, Lü Liping, Guo Jiaming, Ma Guangze	Drama / War / History		
J U L Y	6	Wu Dang	Patrick Leung	Vincent Zhao, Yang Mi, Louis Fan, Xu Jiao, Dennis To, Paw Hee-ching, Wang Xiao, Henry Fong	Action / Adventure / Comedy	Mainland-Hong Kong co-production	
J U L Y	10	McDull - Pork of Music	Brian Tse	Sandra Ng, Anthony Wong, Xu Fei, Hu Ge, Ronald Cheng	Animation / Family / Drama / Comedy	Mainland-Hong Kong co-production	
J U L Y	12	The Four	Gordon Chan, Janet Chun	Deng Chao, Liu Yifei, Ronald Cheng, Collin Chou, Anthony Wong, Wu Xiubo, Jiang Yiyan, Cheng Taishen, Sheren Tang, Anna Fang, Waise Lee, Ryu Kohata, Bao Bei'er, Guigui, Miao Chia, Xiang Tianran, Zhang Zhangsong, Tin Kai-man, Michael Tong	Action / Mystery / Comedy		
J U L Y	12	Song of Silence	Chen Zhuo	Li Qiang, Yin Yaning, Wu Bingbin	Drama		
J U L Y	13	The Zodiac Mystery	Sheng Zhimin	Tong Dawei, Gan Wei, Qin Hao, Kimi Qiao, Liu Yan, Song Ning, Zhang Junhan	Thriller / Drama / Mystery		
J U L Y	20	Fearless	Michael Chiang	Alan Ko, Dany Lee, Lachelle Chan, Eric Wang, Michael Stephen Kai, Liu Mengmeng, Zhang Ningjiang	Drama / Action		
A U G U S T	10	I Love Wolffy	Feng Zhu	Na Zhao, Ying Liang, Qing Zu, Quansheng Gao, Yuting Deng, Hongyun Liu, Yutong Zhu, Lin Zhang	Animation / Adventure / Comedy		
A U G U S T	10	The Silent War	Alan Mak, Felix Chong	Tony Leung Chiu-Wai, Zhou Xun, Mavis Fan, Dong Yong, Wang Xuebing, Bai Ru, Gan Tingting	Mystery / Drama	Mainland-Hong Kong co-production	
A U G U S T	14	The Bullet Vanishes	Law Chi-leung	Nicholas Tse, Lau Ching-wan, Yang Mi, Jing Boran, Wu Gang, Liu Kai-chi, Jiang Yiyan	Action / Mystery	Mainland-Hong Kong co-production	
S E P T E M B E R	26	The Assassins	Zhao Linshan	Chow Yun-fat, Liu Yifei, Hiroshi Tamaki, Alec Su, Annie Yi	Historical / Action		
S E P T E M B E R	27	Tai Chi 0	Stephen Fung	Tony Leung Ka-fai, Angelababy, Peng Yuyan, Feng Shaofeng, Stanley Fung, Leung Siu-lung, Fung Hak-on, Chen Sicheng, Xiong Naijin, Hung Yan-yan, Yuan Wenkang, Daniel Wu, Shu Qi, Stephen Fung, Patrick Tse, Yuen Biao, Andrew Lau	Action		

=== October–December ===
Opening		Title	Director	Cast	Genre	Notes	Ref.
O C T O B E R	25	Tai Chi Hero	Stephen Fung	Tony Leung Ka-fai, Yuan Xiaochao, Shu Qi, Angelababy, Peng Yuyan, Feng Shaofeng, Daniel Wu, Ying Da, Stanley Fung, Xiong Naijin, Wu Di, Yuen Biao, Patrick Tse, Yuan Wenkang, Chen Sicheng	Action / Adventure		
N O V E M B E R	29	The Last Supper	Lu Chuan	Liu Ye, Daniel Wu, Chang Chen, Qin Lan, He Dujuan, Nie Yuan, Sha Yi, Qi Dao, Tao Zeru, Li Qi, Hao Bojie, Huo Siyan	Historical		
D E C E M B E R	12	Lost in Thailand	Xu Zheng	Xu Zheng, Wang Baoqiang, Huang Bo, Fan Bingbing, Tao Hong, Xie Nan	Comedy		
D E C E M B E R	20	CZ12	Jackie Chan	Jackie Chan	Action / Adventure	Mainland-Hong Kong co-production	
D E C E M B E R	20	The Guillotines	Andrew Lau	Huang Xiaoming, Ethan Juan, Wang Yu, Shawn Yue, Li Yuchun, Jing Boran, Zhou Yiwei, Pu Bajia, Li Meng, Wen Zhang, Andrew Lau, Gao Tian, Guan Xiaotong, Stephy Tang	Action / Martial Arts	Mainland-Hong Kong co-production	

== See also ==
- List of Chinese films of 2011
- List of Chinese films of 2013
