= 32nd Hong Kong Film Awards =

2013 Hong Kong Film Awards

- Final revision poster modified by Hong Kong Film Awards Association
- Date: 13 April 2013
- Site: Hong Kong Cultural Centre
- Hosted by: Eric Tsang, Ronald Cheng, Gordon Lam, Jerry Lamb
- Organized by: Hong Kong Film Awards Association Ltd

Highlights
- Most nominations: Cold War, The Bullet Vanishes (12)

Television coverage
- Network: TVB, Now TV, RTHK Radio 2 (live)

The 32nd Hong Kong Film Awards presentation ceremony took place in Hong Kong Cultural Centre on 13 April 2013. The hosts for the awards ceremony were Eric Tsang, Ronald Cheng, Gordon Lam, Jerry Lamb . TVB, Now TV and RTHK Radio 2 were the live broadcasters of the ceremony, with other networks airing simultaneously around the world.

== Awards ==
Winners are listed first, highlighted in boldface, and indicated with a double dagger (‡).

**Best Film**: **Bill Kong, Matthew Tang Hon Keung and Ivy Ho** **and Catherine Kwan— Cold War**‡; Pang Ho-cheung and Subi Liang – Vulgaria; Johnnie To – Motorway; Candy Leung, Albert Lee, Solon So and Wang Zhonglei – The Viral Factor; Derek Yee, Mandy Law and Hiu Man – The Bullet Vanishes	**Best Director**: **Longman Leung and Sunny Luk – Cold War**‡; Soi Cheang Pou-Soi – Motorway; Pang Ho-cheung – Love in the Buff; Law Chi-leung – The Bullet Vanishes; Dante Lam – The Viral Factor
**Best Screenplay**: **Longman Leung and Sunny Luk – Cold War**‡; Pang Ho-cheung, Lam Chiu-wing and Luk Yee-sum – Vulgaria; Pang Ho-cheung and Luk Yee-sum – Love in the Buff; Law Chi-leung and Sin Ling Yeung – The Bullet Vanishes; Alan Mak and Felix Chong – The Silent War	**Best Actor**: **Tony Leung Ka-fai – Cold War**‡; Nick Cheung – Nightfall; Chapman To – Vulgaria; Sean Lau – The Bullet Vanishes; Tony Leung Chiu-Wai – The Silent War
**Best Actress**: **Miriam Yeung – Love in the Buff**‡; Zhou Xun – The Great Magician; Sammi Cheng – Romancing in Thin Air; Zhou Xun – The Silent War; Elanne Kong – Love Lifting	**Best Supporting Actor**: **Ronald Cheng – Vulgaria**‡; Liu Kai-chi – The Bullet Vanishes; Gordon Lam – Cold War; Chapman To – Diva; Alex Man – The Bounty
**Best Supporting Actress**: **Dada Chan – Vulgaria**‡; Siu Yam-yam – Vulgaria; Jiang Yiyan – The Bullet Vanishes; Elaine Jin – The Viral Factor; Mavis Fan – The Silent War	**Best New Performer**: **Alex Tsui – Cold War**‡; Zhang Lanxin – CZ12; Joyce Feng – The Last Tycoon; Jayden Yuan – Tai Chi; Sammy Sum – Lan Kwai Fong 2
**Best Cinematography**: **Anthony Pun – The Silent War**‡; Chan Chi-Ying – The Bullet Vanishes; Kenny Tse – The Viral Factor; Jason Kwan and Kenny Tse – Cold War	**Best Film Editing**: **Kong Chi-Leung and Wong Hoi – Cold War**‡; Yau Chi-Wai – CZ12; Chung Wai-Chiu – The Viral Factor; Kong Chi-Leung and Ron Chan – The Bullet Vanishes; David Richardson and Allen Leung – Motorway
**Best Art Direction**: **Kenneth Yee and Eric Lam – The Last Tycoon**‡; Timmy Yip – Tai Chi; Lau Sai-Wan – The Guillotines; Silver Cheung and Lee Kin-Wai – The Bullet Vanishes; Man Lim-Chung – The Silent War	**Best Costume Make Up Design**: **Kenneth Yee and Jessie Dai – The Great Magician**‡; Kenneth Yee – Tai Chi; Dora Ng – The Guillotines; Stanley Cheung – The Bullet Vanishes; Man Lim-Chung – The Silent War
**Best Action Choreography**: **Jackie Chan and He Jun – CZ12**‡; Sammo Hung – Tai Chi; Chin Ka-lok, Wong Wai-Fai and Ng Hoi-Tong – Motorway; Dante Lam, Chin Ka-lok, Wong Wai-Fai and Ng Hoi-Tong – The Viral Factor; Chin Ka-lok and Wong Wai-Fai – Cold War	**Best Original Film Score**: **Peter Kam – Cold War**‡; Comfort Chan and Yu Peng – The Last Tycoon; Teddy Robin and Tomy Wai – The Bullet Vanishes; Eman Lam and Veronica Lee – Diva; Comfort Chan – The Silent War
**Best Original Film Song**: **Ding Feng Bo – The Last Tycoon**‡; Composer:Leon Ko; Lyricist:Chris Shum; Singer:Jacky Cheung; Face The Cold Blade – The Guillotines; Composer:Jay Chou; Lyricist:Vincent Fang; Singer:Li Yuchun; Do Re Mi – Romancing In Thin Air; Singer:Lo Tayu; Lyricist:Lin Xi; Singer:Sammi Cheng; Love Only Love —Lan Kwai Fong 2; Composer:Charmaine Fong; Lyricist:Lin Xi; Singer:Leo Ku; Zui Fung Zheng Dek Fung Zheng – Diva; Composer:Davy Chan & C.Y. Kong, Lyricist:Lin Xi; Singer:Joey Yung & Mag Lam	**Best Sound Design**: **Kinson Tsang – Cold War**‡; Kinson Tsang – The Guillotines; Benny Chu and Steve Miller – Motorway; Phyllis Cheng – The Bullet Vanishes; Kinson Tsang – The Viral Factor
**Best Visual Effects**: **Cecil Cheng – Cold War**‡; Han Young-Woo, Victor Wong, Patrick Chui and Seong Ho-Jang – CZ12; Chas Chau, Kim Ho and Ng Yuen-Fai – Tai Chi; Victor Wong and Darkus Yu – The Guillotines; Law Wai-Ho and Hellowing Cheung – Motorway	**Best New Director**: **Chow Hin-Yeung – Nightfall**‡; Brian Tse – McDull: The Pork of Music; Fung Chih-Chiang – The Bounty
**Best Film from Mainland and Taiwan**: **Back to 1942 (mainland China)** ‡; Girlfriend, Boyfriend (Taiwan); Love Is Not Blind (mainland China); Painted Skin: The Resurrection (mainland China); Love (Taiwan)

== Special awards ==
Lifetime Achievement Award
Name	Gender	Occupation(s)	Reason
Ng See-yuen	Male	Director, producer	

Professional Achievement Award
Name	Gender	Occupation(s)	Reason
Ko Tin Chow	Male		
Olivia Lui Lai-wah	Female		

== Presenters ==
Best Film

- Andy Lau, Carina Lau

Best Director

- Aaron Kwok

Best Screenplay

- Giddens Ko

Best Actor

- Deanie Ip, Anthony Wong

Best Actress

- Jacky Cheung

Best Supporting Actor

- Nick Cheung, Miriam Yeung

Best Supporting Actress

- Andrew Lau, Gigi Leung

Best Cinematography, Best Film Editing

- Stephen Fung

Best Art Direction, Best Costume and Makeup Design

- Alex Man, Janice Man

Best Action Choreography

- Eric Tsang, Chrissie Chau

Best Sound Design, Best Visual Effects

- Lo Hoi-pang

Best Original Film Score, Best Original Film Song

- Mavis Fan, Choi Siwon

Best New Director, Best New Performer

- Chapman To, Pang Ho-cheung

Best Film of Mainland and Taiwan

- Jackie Chan

Lifetime Achievement Award

- Raymond Chow

Professional Achievement Award

- Wong Kar-wai

== Performances ==
- Love Only Love, Lan Kwai Fong 2 by Leo Ku
- Zui Fung Zheng Dek Fung Zheng, Diva by Mag Lam
- Ding Feng Bo, The Last Tycoon by Jacky Cheung
- Anthony Wong (Tribute to Leslie Cheung and Anita Mui; both died 10 years ago)

True
