= Huading Awards =

Chinese entertainment awards

- Country: China
- Presented by: Global Talents Media Group, Inc
- First award: 2007
- Website: www.huadingjiang.com/cn/default.aspx

Huading Awards
- Traditional Chinese: 華鼎獎
- Simplified Chinese: 华鼎奖
Transcriptions
Standard Mandarin
- Hanyu Pinyin: Huádǐng Jiǎng

The Huading Awards are a set of entertainment awards in China. The awards were set up by Global Talents Media Group, Inc in 2007 and are held more than once each year across multiple entertainment media from Chinese television shows to international films and music.

== History ==
The 1st Huading Awards poll was held on December 17, 2007. The name Huading, Hua comes from The Biography of Book of Documents, it also means the Chinese nation; Ding comes from Records of the Grand Historian, it means word carries weight.

On October 7, 2013, the 10th Huading Awards ceremony was held in Macao.

On June 1, 2014, the 12th Huading Awards ceremony was held at the Ricardo Montalbán Theatre in Hollywood. On December 15, 2017, the 21st Huading Awards were held at the Ace Hotel Los Angeles.

== Ceremonies ==
There are four main ceremonies held under the Huading Awards.

- Huading Award China Film Satisfaction Survey Release Ceremony (中国电影满意度调查发布盛典) – Film
  - The 5th, 9th, 12th, 16th, 20th, 21st editions are under this ceremony.
- Huading Award "The Night of Cadillac" Top 100 TV Series Satisfactory Survey Release Ceremony (中国百强电视剧满意度调查盛典) – Television
  - The 4th, 6th, 8th, 13th, 17th, 19th editions are under this ceremony.
- Huading Night Release Ceremony of Public Image Survey of China Performing Celebrity (演藝名人滿意度調查) – Film, TV, Music
  - The 1st, 2nd, 3rd, 7th, 10th, 15th, 18th editions are under this ceremony.
- Huading Award Global Music Satisfaction Survey (华鼎奖全球音乐满意度调查颁奖盛典) – Music
  - The 11th and 14th editions are under this ceremony.

Edition	Type	Date	Venue, Refs
1st	Public Image	December 17, 2007	Beijing, China
2nd	Public Image	March 23, 2009	Millennium Hotel, Beijing, China
3rd	Public Image	May 5, 2010	Jingxi Hotel, Beijing, China
4th	Television	November 13, 2010	Taiyuan Binhe Sports Center (太原濱河體育中心), Taiyuan, China
5th	Film	March 1, 2011	Mastercard Center, Beijing, China
6th	Television	December 8, 2011	Shenzhen Stadium, Shenzhen, Guangdong, China
7th	Public Image	July 4, 2012	Olympic Sports Centre, Beijing, China
8th	Television	December 10, 2012	Shanghai Culture Square Theater (上海文化廣場劇院), Shanghai, China
9th	Film	April 10, 2013	Kowloonbay International Trade & Exhibition Centre Star Hall, Kowloon, Hong Kong
10th	Public Image	October 7, 2013	The Venetian Macao, Macau
11th	Music	December 18, 2013	Shanghai World Expo Center Red Hall (上海世博中心紅廳)
12th	Film	June 1, 2014	Montalban Theater, Hollywood, California, U.S.
13th	Television	August 27, 2014	Beijing Orient MGM International Hotel (北京东方美高美国际酒店), Beijing, China
14th	Music	2015	Shanghai World Expo Center (上海世博中心), Shanghai, China
15th	Public Image	January 18, 2015	The Venetian Macao, Macau
16th	Film	June 1, 2015	Kowloonbay International Trade & Exhibition Centre, Hong Kong
17th	Television	August 9, 2015	Shanghai World Expo Center (上海世博中心), Shanghai, China
18th	Public Image	March 31, 2016	Studio City, Macau
19th	Television	May 21, 2016	Chengdu OCT Grand (成都华侨城隆重), Chengu, China
20th	Film (domestic)	September 7, 2016	Kowloonbay International Trade & Exhibition Centre, Hong Kong
21st	Film (international)	December 15, 2016	Ace Hotel Los Angeles, Los Angeles, California, U.S.
22nd	Television	May 18, 2017	Suzhou Culture and Arts Centre, Suzhou, Jiangsu, China

== Award results ==
Award results for editions not listed in their own article.

=== Film ===
Also known as China Film Satisfaction Survey Release Ceremony (中国电影满意度调查发布盛典)

==== 21st edition ====
Year	Category	Winner	Work	Notes
2016	Best Screenplay	Drew Goddard, Andy Weir	The Martian	
2016	Best Film	The Martian		
2016	Best Actress	Bryce Dallas Howard	Jurassic World	
2016	Best Stunt	Jeff Imada	Fast and Furious 7	
2016	Lifetime Achievement Award	Sylvester Stallone		
2016	Jury Award	Natalie Portman, Hilary Swank, Mel Gibson		

==== 20th edition ====
Year	Category	Winner	Work	Notes
2016	Best Director	Guan Hu	Mr. Six	
2016	Best Film	Mr. Six		
2016	Best Screenplay	Wu Jing, Liu Yi, Dong Qun, Gao Yan	Wolf Warriors	
2016	Best Actor	Chen Jianbin	A Fool	
2016	Best Actress	Song Jia	The Final Master	
2016	Best Supporting Actor	Zhang Jin	SPL II: A Time for Consequences	
2016	Best Supporting Actress	Li Yuan	Go Away Mr. Tumor	
2016	Best New Director	Wu Jing	Wolf Warriors	
2016	Best Newcomer	Liu Haoran	Detective Chinatown	
2016	Best Film Producer	Lu Jianmin	Wolf Warriors	
2016	Best Film Producer	Liu Hongtao	Goodbye Mr. Loser	
2016	Best Film Producer	Song Xianqiang	A Fool	
2016	Best 3D Film	Farewell My Concubine		
2016	Best Action Choreography	Li Zhongzhi	Wolf Warriors	
2016	Best Film Production Company	Huayi Brothers		
2016	Best Film Voted by Audience	Wolf Warriors		
2016	Lifetime Honor Award	Wu Ma		

==== 16th edition ====
Year	Category	Winner	Work	Notes
2015	Best Director	Peter Chan	Dearest	
2015	Best Film	Dearest		
2015	Best Screenplay	Li Han, Liu Han	Fleet of Time	
2015	Best Actor	Mark Chao	Black & White: The Dawn of Justice	
2015	Best Actress	Zhao Wei	Dearest	
2015	Best Supporting Actor	Adrien Brody	Dragon Blade	
2015	Best Supporting Actress	Jiang Yiyan	The Four III	
2015	Best New Director	Lu Yang	Brotherhood of Blades	
2015	Best Newcomer	Christie Chen	Kung Fu Jungle	
2015	Best Animation Film	McDull: Me & My Mum		
2015	Best Film OST	Jackie Chan	"Hero of the Desert" (Dragon Blade)	
2015	Best Action Choreography	JC Stunt Team	Dragon Blade	
2015	Best Film Production Company	Emperor Motion Pictures		
2015	Film Achievement Award	Ge You		
2015	Lifetime Achievement Award	Lisa Lu		

==== 12th edition ====
Year	Category	Winner	Work	Notes
2014	Best Director	Guillermo del Toro	Pacific Rim	
2014	Best Film	Fast & Furious 6		
2014	Best Actor	Orlando Bloom	The Hobbit: The Desolation of Smaug	
2014	Best Actress	Halle Berry	X-Men: The Last Stand	
2014	Best Supporting Actor	Jeremy Renner	American Hustle	
2014	Best Supporting Actress	Zoe Saldaña	Star Trek Into Darkness	
2014	Best Newcomer	Charlie Hunnam	Pacific Rim	
2014	Best Animation Film	The Croods		
2014	Lifetime Achievement Award	Hans Zimmer		

==== 9th edition ====
Year	Category	Winner	Work	Notes
2013	Best Director	Jackie Chan	CZ12	
2013	Best Film	Cold War		
2013	Best Screenplay	Law Chi-leung, Yeung Sin-ling	The Bullet Vanishes	
2013	Best Actor	Nicholas Tse	The Bullet Vanishes	
2013	Best Actress	Fan Bingbing	Double Xposure	
2013	Best Supporting Actor	Chapman To	Diva	
2013	Best Supporting Actress	Mavis Fan	The Silent War	
2013	Best New Director	Xu Zheng	Lost in Thailand	
2013	Best Newcomer	Zhang Lanxin	CZ12	
2013	Best Trans-Boundary Artist	Xiaoshenyang		
2013	Best Animation Film	Kuiba		
2013	Best Short Film	Father		
2013	Best Film OST	Li Daimo & Jike Junyi	"I think of it in" (Double Xposure)	
2013	Best Action Choreography	JC Stunt Team	CZ12	
2013	Best Film Production Company	Polybona Films, Emperor Motion Pictures		
2013	Most Popular with the Media (Artist)	Wang Baoqiang, Angelababy		
2013	Most Popular with the Media (Film OST)	Theway Zhang	"Hero's Rise" (Tai Chi Hero OST)	
2013	Best Foreign Actor	Lee Byung-hun		
2013	Film Achievement Award	Deanie Ip		
2013	Lifetime Achievement Award	Raymond Chow		

==== 5th edition ====
Year	Category	Winner	Work	Notes
2011	Best Director	Feng Xiaogang	Aftershock	
2011	Best Film	The Founding of a Republic		
2011	Best Actor	Donnie Yen	Ip Man 2	
2011	Best Actress	Xu Fan	Aftershock	
2011	Best Actor/Actress (Romance film)	Yao Chen	Love In Cosmo	
2011	Best Actor/Actress (Fantasy film)	Charlene Choi	The Storm Warriors	
2011	Best Actor/Actress (Comedy film)	Gillian Chung	The Fantastic Water Babes	
2011	Best Actor/Actress (Drama film)	Aaron Kwok	Murderer	
2011	Best Supporting Actor	Nicholas Tse	Bodyguards and Assassins	
2011	Best Supporting Actress	Ruby Lin	Sophie's Revenge	
2011	Best Newcomer	Xiaoshenyang, Li Chen, Qin Lan, Yao Di, Michelle Bai, Bai Jing, Wang Luodan, Jiang Ruijia, Yuan Ting, Michelle Wai		
2011	Best Film OST	Sa Dingding	"Royal Guards" (14 Blades OST)	
2011	Audience Voted Number One Chinese Film	Aftershock		
2011	Audience Voted Number One Foreign Film	Avatar		
2011	Most Anticipated Actor	Han Geng	My Kingdom	
2011	Top 10 Favorite Stars		Liu Xiaoqing, Zhang Ziyi, Liu Ye, Xia Yu, Dong Jie, Xu Qing, Aaron Kwok, Nicholas Tse, Yang Lixin, Barbie Hsu	
2011	Outstanding Achievement Award	Wong Kar-wai, Zhang Ziyi		

=== Public Image Survey ===
==== 18th edition ====
Year	Region	Category	Winner	Work	Notes
2015	China	Best Director	Raman Hui	Monster Hunt	
2015	China	Best Film Actor	Duan Yihong	The Dead End	
2015	China	Best Film Actress	Xu Qing	Mr. Six	
2015	China	Best TV Actor	Li Chen		
2015	China	Best TV Actress	Ruby Lin		
2015	China	Best Male Singer	Jeff Chang		
2015	China	Best Female Singer	Karen Mok		
2015	China	Best Newcomer	Lin Yun	The Mermaid	
2015	China	Best Host	Hua Shao		
2015	China	Best Dance Performer	Cao Shuci (Ballet)		
2015	China	Best Magician	Louis Liu		
2015	Global	Best Director	Jean-Jacques Annaud	Wolf Totem	
2015	Global	Best Actor	Sophie Turner	Game of Thrones	
2015	Global	Best TV Actor	Yoon Eun-hye		
2015	Global	Best Singer	Kyuhyun		
2015	Global	Best Idol Group	f(x)		

==== 15th edition ====
Year	Region	Category	Winner	Work	Notes
2015	China	Best Director	Tsai Yueh-Hsun		
2015	China	Best Film Actor	Donnie Yen	The Monkey King	
2015	China	Best Film Actress	Eva Huang	Nature Law	
2015	China	Best TV Actor	Raymond Lam	Line Walker	
2015	China	Best TV Actress	Charmaine Sheh	Line Walker	
2015	China	Most Popular Singer	Yao Beina		
2015	China	Best Host	Li Kun		
2015	China	Best Dancer	Zhu Han		
2015	Global	Best Director	Michael Mann		
2015	Global	Best Film Actor	Chris Hemsworth	Thor: The Dark World	
2015	Global	Best Film Actress	Naomi Watts	Diana	
2015	Global	Best TV Actor	Kim Soo-hyun	My Love From the Star	
2015	Global	Best TV Actress	Han Ye-seul	Birth of a Beauty	
2015	Global	Best Singer	Wang Leehom		
2015	Global	Best Group	Super Junior		
2015	Global	Best Dance Performer	Rino Nakasone		
2015		Lifetime Achievement Award	Mei Baojiu		

==== 10th edition ====
Year	Region	Category	Winner	Work	Notes
2013	China	Best Director	Dante Lam	Unbeatable	
2013	China	Best New Director	Xue Xiaolu	Finding Mr. Right	
2013	China	Best Film Actor	Nick Cheung	Unbeatable	
2013	China	Best Film Actress	Zhang Ziyi	The Grandmaster	
2013	China	Best TV Actor	Raymond Lam	Highs and Lows	
2013	China	Best TV Actress	Fala Chen	Queens of Diamonds and Hearts	
2013	China	Best Theater Actor	Anthony Wong	Enigma Variations	
2013	China	Best Theater Actress	Xu Qing	A Dream Like A Dream	
2013	China	Best Opera Actor	Feng Gong		
2013	China	Best Opera Actress	Liu Lanfang		
2013	China	Best Stage Actor	Chang Dong		
2013	China	Best Stage Actress	Chen Cheng		
2013	China	Best Male Singer	Terry Lin		
2013	China	Best Female Singer	Sophia Huang		
2013	China	Best Male Host	Li Yong		
2013	China	Best Female Host	Sally Wu		
2013	China	Best Male Dance Performer	Sha Xia Jun Nan		
2013	China	Best Female Dance Performer	Wang Qimin		
2013	China	Most Popular with the Media	Song Xiaobao, Lisa Ono		
2013	China	Lifetime Achievement Award	Liu Xiaoqing		
2013	Global	Best Director	Quentin Tarantino		
2013	Global	Best Film Actor	Nicolas Cage		
2013	Global	Best Film Actress	Nicole Kidman		
2013	Global	Best TV Actor	Matthew Perry		
2013	Global	Best TV Actress	Michelle Dockery		
2013	Global	Best Action Performer	Sam Worthington		
2013	Global	Best Singer	Avril Lavigne		
2013	Global	Best Idol Group	Girls' Generation		
2013	Global	Best Male Dance Performer	Anthony		
2013	Global	Best Female Dance Performer	Sharon Savoia		
2013	Global	Lifetime Achievement Award	Jeremy Irons		

=== Music ===
Also known as the Huading Award Global Music Satisfaction Survey.

==== 14th edition ====
Year	Region	Category	Winner	Work	Notes
2015	China	Most Popular Album	Ada Huang	I've been thinking	
2015	China	Most Popular Song	Chopstick Brothers	Little Apple	
2015	China	Most Popular Group	Chopstick Brothers		
2015	China	Most Popular Male Singer	Terry Lin		
2015	China	Most Popular Female Singer	Sophia Huang		
2015	China	Most Popular Singer-Songwriter	Xu Song		
2015	China	Most Popular Musician	Mark Lui		
2015	China	Most Popular Potential Singer	Jin Guisheng		
2015	China	Most Popular Newcomer	Zhang Bichen		
2015	China	Lifetime Achievement Award	Zhou Xiaoyan		
2015	Global	Most Popular Group	Exo		
2015	Global	Most Popular Male Singer	Cody Simpson		
2015	Global	Most Popular Female Singer	Park Hye-kyung		
2015	Global	Most Popular Newcomer	Tasty		
2015	Global	Lifetime Achievement Award	Michael Bolton		

==== 11th edition ====
Year	Region	Category	Winner	Work	Notes
2013	China	Best Album	Vanness Wu	Different Man	
2013	China	Best Single	Eason Chan	Stable Happiness	Not awarded due to absence from ceremony.
2013	China	Best Commercial Song	Escape Plan	"Brightest Star in the Night Sky"	
2013	China	Best Group	BY2		
2013	China	Best Male Singer	Sun Nan		
2013	China	Best Female Singer	Laure Shang		
2013	China	Best Band	Black Panther		
2013	China	Best Musician	Jonathan Lee		
2013	China	Best Singer-Songwriter	Chen Chusheng		
2013	China	Best New Singer	Zhang Hengyuan, Jike Junyi		
2013	China	Fans' Choice Award	Sa Dingding, Leo Ku		
2013	China	Chinese Music Contribution Award	Shi Guangnan		
2013	China	Lifetime Achievement Award	Jin Tielin		
2013	Global	Best Male Singer	Adam Lambert		
2013	Global	Most Popular Female Singer	Carly Rae Jepsen		
2013	Global	Best New Band	Dent May		

== See also ==
- List of Asian television awards
- List of film festivals in China
