= Full Throttle (film) =

1995 Hong Kong film by Derek Yee

- Film poster
- Traditional Chinese: 烈火戰車
- Simplified Chinese: 烈火战车
- Hanyu Pinyin: Liè Huǒ Zhàn Chē
- Jyutping: Lit4 Fo2 Zin3 Ce1
- Directed by: Derek Yee
- Screenplay by: Derek Yee; Law Chi-leung
- Produced by: Alexander Chan
- Starring: Andy Lau; Gigi Leung; David Wu
- Cinematography: Jingle Ma; David Chung; Tony Cheung
- Edited by: Kwong Chi-leung
- Music by: Frankie Chan; Richard Yuen; Roel A. Garcia
- Production companies: Win's Entertainment (presented); Film Unlimited (produced)
- Distributed by: China Star Entertainment
- Release date: 14 December 1995
- Running time: 108 minutes
- Country: Hong Kong
- Language: Cantonese
- Box office: HK$33,770,736

Full Throttle (烈火戰車) is a 1995 Hong Kong action drama film directed by Derek Yee and starring Andy Lau.

== Plot ==
Joe is a youth who loves auto racing. His father Paul operates a motorbike business which often organizes motorbike teams to race in Macau and Japan and his racers would often be awarded the crown bike. However, Joe has been rumored to be the best among the racers because every crown bike is always defeated in hands of Joe on the streets. Since Joe's license has been revoked for speeding at the age of 19, he is unable to participate in an official race and can only secretly race in the streets to fulfill his desire of racing on the roads. Joe's father is very irritated about this and views his son as an outlaw biker so he prohibits his racers to race with Joe which sours their father and son relationship. Joe owns an auto repair shop with his friend Jimmy. Joe's girlfriend Annie is very gentle and kind but she always worries about her boyfriend racing.

David is a youth racer returning from England and hits it off with Joe. Seven years later, Joe readmits his license, ready to show his talents in a race in Macau, but is unable to obtain a racing license which leads him to think that his father is playing some dirty tricks. Retired racer Lo Kwai advises Joe to reconcile with his father to get a better chance to race. But as usual, once the father and son meet, they argue and his father give the place of the final racer to David. Paul's racers have always been dissatisfied with Joe but races with him. In the process, Joe becomes injured in the accident and lands in a coma for 10 days. Under Annie's care, Joe's condition improves but he ultimately misses the race in Macau as he hopelessly watches David become the champion.

After the accident, Joe develops a fear of racing, and is afraid that he can no longer race in the future. Annie is happy about this and persuades him to give up racing and concentrate on operating his repair shop. However, other bikers are waiting for Joe to defeat Macau champion David on the streets but Joe has yet to take action. Rumors spread that Joe is scared and can no longer race. Jimmy is extremely indignant about this and challenges David himself. Jimmy gets into an accident and dies from his injuries.

Jimmy's death leads Joe to become even more determined to overcome his fear and get his confidence back. Because of Joe's decision to officially challenge David, Anne becomes heartbroken and decides to leave him. Joe arranges to race with David in the mountains, hoping to find the pleasurable feeling of racing again. Initially, Joe lost pace as he had constant flashbacks from the near-fatal crash he had and he had to stop for a while. Which stopping, he managed to hype himself up and went on to match and even chase down David who has distance on him. After a few laps, Joe stops to avoid crashing into the cart and empty cans that had rolled onto the road and spilled over being collected by an old lady. The old lady speaks a few words to Joe which woke him up to what he is doing and after the race, questions whether both David and him are stupid to throw their lives like this for vain and unwanted glory and after the talk with David, he decides to give up racing forever and chases after Annie on the advice of David.

== Cast ==
- Andy Lau as Joe
- Paul Chun as Paul
- Chin Kar-lok as Jimmy
- David Wu as David
- Gigi Leung as Annie
- Elvis Tsui as Lo Kwai
- Lau Ying-hung as Kwang
- Law Chi-leung as Chu
- Ha Ping as Jimmy's Grandmother

== Theme song ==
- The Affectionate Sentence (情深的一句) / Never Give Up (絕不放棄)
  - Composer: Eric Chen
  - Lyricist: Andy Lau (Cantonese) / Daryl Yao (Mandarin)
  - Arranger: Tu Ying
  - Singer: Andy Lau

== Box office ==
The film grossed a strong HK$33,770,736 at the Hong Kong box office during its theatrical run from 14 December 1995 to 24 January 1996 in Hong Kong.

== Awards and nominations ==
Awards and nominations
Ceremony	Category	Recipient	Outcome
15th Hong Kong Film Awards	Best Film	Full Throttle	Nominated
15th Hong Kong Film Awards	Best Director	Derek Yee	Nominated
15th Hong Kong Film Awards	Best Actor	Andy Lau	Nominated
15th Hong Kong Film Awards	Best Supporting Actor	Chin Ka-lok	Nominated
15th Hong Kong Film Awards	Best Supporting Actress	Ha Ping	Nominated
15th Hong Kong Film Awards	Best New Performer	Gigi Leung	Nominated
15th Hong Kong Film Awards	Best Screenplay	Derek Yee, Law Chi-leung	Nominated
15th Hong Kong Film Awards	Best Action Choreography	Bruce Law	Nominated
15th Hong Kong Film Awards	Best Film Editing	Kwong Chi-leung	Won
15th Hong Kong Film Awards	Best Original Film Song	Song: The Affectionate Sentence (情深的一句) Composer: Eric Chen; Lyricist/Singer: Andy Lau	Nominated
37th Golden Horse Awards	Best Audiovisual Technology	Full Throttle	Nominated
2nd Hong Kong Film Critics Society Award	Best Director	Derek Yee	Won
2nd Hong Kong Film Critics Society Award	Film of Merit	Full Throttle	Won
1st Golden Bauhinia Awards	Best Supporting Actor	Chin Ka-lok	Won
1st Golden Bauhinia Awards	Top Ten Chinese-language Films of the Year	Full Throttle	Won
5th Hong Kong Screenwriters' Guild	Best Screenplay	Derek Yee, Law Chi-leung	Won
8th Hong Kong Film Directors' Guild	Most Outstanding Director	Derek Yee	Won
8th Hong Kong Film Directors' Guild	Most Recommended Film	Full Throttle	Won

== See also ==
- List of biker films
- Honda NSR250R
