= Tang Dan (film director) =

Chinese film director

- 唐丹
- Born: September 11, 1975 (age 50); Chengdu, Sichuan
- Education: Sichuan University, Konrad Wolf Film University of Babelsberg
- Occupation: Film director
- Years active: 2005 - present

Tang Dan (Chinese: 唐丹) (born 11 September 1975) is a film director from mainland China who studied in Germany.

== Biography ==
=== Early life and education ===
Tang Dan was born 11 September 1975 in Chengdu, Sichuan. She graduated from the Sichuan Fine Arts Institute in 1998, having studied art and painting. In 1997–1998 she was an exchange student at Kunsthochschule Kassel. In 2000 Tang went to the University of Wuppertal to study communication design with a specialization in photo and film. In 2001–2002 she was a guest student at Deutsche Film- und Fernsehakademie Berlin. She was admitted to the Konrad Wolf Film University of Babelsberg in 2003, where her teachers included the influential gay rights activist Rosa von Praunheim. She completed a master's degree in film directing at Konrad Wolf in 2007.

=== Filmography ===
- 2005 Make Love in Heaven, script and direction, 25:30 min. Student film about the first sexual experience of a girl who wants to become an artist.
- 2006 The Autumn for Guoguo (pinyin: Guoguo de qiutian), starring Boru Ren and Yi Guo
- 2008 Dream Team (Chinese: 梦之队; pinyin: Mèng zhī duì), a family drama where a football coach turns to coaching tug-of-war to primary school kids.
- 2009 Feathered Fan and Silken Ribbon, written and directed by Wieland Schulz-Keil and Tang Dan, and edited by Volker Schaner. A documentary about classical Peking opera in modern Beijing.
- 2011 I Phone You (Chinese: 爱封了; pinyin: Ài fēngle) a romantic comedy co-written with Wolfgang Kohlhaase and starring Florian Lukas and Jiang Yiyan.
- 2012 The Secret Garden (Chinese: 秘密花園; pinyin: Mìmì huāyuán), a romantic comedy starring Wallace Chung and Weiwei Tan
