= Ridgey Didge =

- Genre: Children's television series
- Presented by: Jared Robinsen; Rebecca Hetherington; Simon Watt; Danny Carretti; Chris Harriott; Ashley Paske
- Theme music composer: Chris Harriott
- Country of origin: Australia
- Original language: English
- No. of seasons: 3
- No. of episodes: 39

Production
- Executive producer: Ian Fairweather
- Producer: Penni-Anne Smith
- Production locations: TEN Studios, North Ryde, New South Wales
- Running time: 52 minutes (excluding commercials)

Original release
- Network: Network Ten
- Release: 7 September 1987 – 24 February 1989

Related
- Off the Dish; Double Dare Australia

Ridgey Didge was a popular Network Ten magazine television program for children in Australia. The name is an Australian slang term meaning honest, true or the real thing.

== Format ==
A long-running series of 52-minute programs, each studio-based episode was intended to be an entertaining voyage of adventure and discovery for the viewers, constantly covering new topics reflecting Australian life and culture. Location segments added to the mix. One episode recorded sealing a time capsule to commemorate Australia's bicentennial in 1988; the capsule was opened in 2001.

== Presenters ==
A team of presenters hosted each program:

- Jared Robinsen
- Rebecca Hetherington (daughter of Norman Hetherington)
- Simon Watt
- Danny Carretti
- Chris Harriott
- Ashley Paske

They were joined by puppet characters

- Shorn Sheep (operated by Danny Carretti)
- Buzz the Blowfly (operated by Simon Watt)
- Buzzle the Blowfly

Other presenters of regular segments:

- Dr. Glenn Singleman (medicine)
- Dean Taylor (art)

== Catchphrase ==
The lyrics in the signature tune repeated the words ridgey didge several times which became a catchphrase amongst the target audience. This was accompanied with a hand gesture. The three middle fingers of the right hand were closed, leaving the thumb and little finger extended; the hand was then twisted from side to side in time with the rhythm of the music.

== Transmission ==
The show aired between 1987 and 1989, Monday to Friday at 4 p.m. on Network TEN!

== The competition ==
- Wombat — Seven Network
- C'mon Kids — Nine Network
- Play School — ABC Television

== Production crew ==
Produced by the in-house production department based at the TEN studios in North Ryde, New South Wales, Australia:

- Executive producer – Ian Fairweather
- Producer – Penni-Anne Smith
- Production manager – Dawn Aronie
- Writers – Tammy Burnstock, Simon Watt
- Location director – Lou Petho
- Production assistant — Michael Carrington
- Production assistant – Deborah Kingsford
