= Rest on Your Shoulder =

- Film poster
- Directed by: Jacob Cheung
- Written by: Jacob Cheung; Polly Yeung
- Produced by: Jacob Cheung; Zheng Ping Liu; Zhe Yuan Zhang
- Starring: Gwei Lun-mei; Gigi Leung; Chen Kun; Jiang Yiyan
- Cinematography: Ardy Lam
- Edited by: Eric Kong
- Music by: Joe Hisaishi
- Production company: Ning Bei Dao Cao Jia Cou Television Planning Co. Ltd.
- Distributed by: EDKO Film Ltd.
- Release date: 8 July 2011
- Running time: 122 minutes
- Country: China
- Language: Mandarin

Rest on Your Shoulder (Chinese: 肩上蝶) is a 2011 Chinese fantasy film created by Ning Bei Dao Cao Jia Cou Television Planning Co. Ltd. and released by EDKO Film Ltd. It was directed by Jacob Cheung. The film stars Gwei Lun-mei, Chen Kun, Gigi Leung and Jiang Yiyan.

== Plot ==
The film begins with a famous doctor, Yan Guo, becoming extremely sick during the course of his studies. To save his life, his girlfriend Baobao makes an agreement with a mysterious creature; in exchange for the health of Yan Guo, she agrees to be turned into a butterfly for three years.

Yan Guo finally recovers from his illness and wakes up. He is confused and hurt by Baobao's disappearance, and in her absence other women begin trying to attract his attention. Meanwhile, Baobao begins living her life as a butterfly, but finds that the other insects will not associate with her, finding her too human.

Soon, an infectious disease begins spreading on the island. Yan Guo and Baobao try their best during this time to help those around them.

== Cast ==
- Chen Kun as Yan Guo
- Gwei Lun-mei as Bai Lan
- Jiang Yiyan as Baobao
- Gigi Leung as Yang Lin
