= I Phone You =

- Directed by: Tang Dan
- Written by: Wolfgang Petersen, Tang Dan
- Produced by: Peter Schwartzkopff
- Starring: Florian Lukas; Jiang Yiyan
- Release dates: May 26, 2011 (Germany); October 13, 2011 (China)
- Countries: China; Germany

I Phone You (Chinese: 爱封了; pinyin: Ài fēngle) is a 2011 Chinese/German romantic comedy film directed by Tang Dan.

== Cast ==
- Florian Lukas
- Jiang Yiyan as Ling Ling
