= One Night Stud =

- 有种你爱我 (You zhong ni ai wo)
- Directed by: Li Xinman
- Production companies: Shanghai Kaiyi Entertainment Co., Ltd; Yongkang Fenghai Pictures Co., Ltd; Guangdong Zhujiang Film Group Co., Ltd; Shanghai Siyuan Entertainment Co., Ltd; Zhejiang Hengdian Film Distribution Co., Ltd; Yiyi International Entertainment ( Beijing) Co., Ltd; Beijing Xuanya International Investment Co., Ltd; Television Broadcasts China Limited; Zhongshi Jufeng（Beijing）Media Co., Ltd; Cineway Films Co., Ltd. Pearl River Pictures Co., Ltd
- Distributed by: Fenghai Media; Pearl River Pictures Co., Ltd; Zhejiang Hengdian Film Distribution Co., Ltd; Hongkong Ultimate Movie Experience; Shanghai Kaiyi Entertainment Co., Ltd
- Release date: 6 February 2015
- Running time: 105 minutes
- Country: China
- Language: Mandarin
- Box office: CN¥10.62 million

One Night Stud (Chinese: 有种你爱我) is a 2015 Chinese romantic comedy film directed by Li Xinman. It was released on 6 February 2015. This movie was also partly filmed in Okinawa, Japan.

== Cast ==
- Jiang Yiyan
- Ryan Cheng
- Yu Xiao
- Yu Jiameng
- Chang Fangyuan
- Johnson Chen
- Liu Sha
- Shi Chunling
- Li Changlin
- Tan Shasha
- Hasi Gaowa
- Wang Yingran

== Reception ==
By February 6, the film had earned CN¥10.62 million at the Chinese box office.
