= Mr. Vampire IV =

1988 Hong Kong film by Ricky Lau

- Original Hong Kong film poster

Chinese name
- Traditional Chinese: 殭屍叔叔
- Simplified Chinese: 僵尸叔叔
Transcriptions
Standard Mandarin
- Hanyu Pinyin: Jiāngshī Shūshū
Yue: Cantonese
- Jyutping: Goeng1 Si1 Suk1 Suk1
- Directed by: Ricky Lau
- Screenplay by: Lo Wing-keung
- Story by: Ricky Lau; Lo Wing-Keung; Shut Mei-yee; Sam Chi-Leung
- Produced by: Sammo Hung; Jessica Chan
- Starring: Anthony Chan; Wu Ma; Chin Ka-lok; Rachel Lee
- Cinematography: Abdul M. Rumjahn; Tom Lau; Bill Wong
- Edited by: Peter Cheung; Keung Chuen-tak
- Music by: Stephen Shing
- Production companies: Bo Ho Films Co., Ltd.; Paragon Films Ltd.
- Distributed by: Golden Harvest
- Release date: 12 December 1988
- Running time: 96 minutes
- Country: Hong Kong
- Language: Cantonese
- Box office: HK$14,038,901

Mr. Vampire IV, also known as Mr. Vampire Saga Four (Chinese: 殭屍叔叔), is a 1988 Hong Kong comedy horror film directed by Ricky Lau and produced by Sammo Hung and Jessica Chan. The film is the fourth of a series of five films directed by Ricky Lau in the Mr. Vampire franchise. Mr. Vampire and its sequels were released as part of the jiangshi cinematic boom in Hong Kong during the 1980s. The Chinese title of the film literally translates to Uncle Vampire. The film’s story has two distinctive halves, the first part emphasising the slapstick comedy produced by the rivalry of the quarrelling neighbours, a Taoist monk and Buddhist priest. The second half is more action orientated as a vampire is released, causing mayhem.

== Plot ==
In the rural countryside, a bespectacled Taoist priest (called Four-eyed Taoist) is always at odds with his neighbour, a Buddhist monk called Master Yat-yau. Their respective students, Kar-lok and Ching-ching, are friendly towards each other. The Taoist and Buddhist play pranks on each other.

One day, a convoy of soldiers escorting a coffin passes by their houses. Inside the convoy is Four-eyed's junior, Taoist Crane, and Crane's four disciples, as well as a young prince and his bodyguards. Four-eyed and Yat-yau learn from Crane that there is a jiangshi (Chinese "hopping" vampire) in the coffin, and the convoy is on its way to the capital to let the emperor inspect the jiangshi.

During a thunderstorm that night, rainwater washes away the magical charms on the coffin and the vampire breaks out, becoming more powerful after being struck by a bolt of lightning. The vampire starts attacking everyone in the convoy and infecting them with the "vampire virus", causing them to transform into vampires as well after a short time. Taoist Crane remains behind to hold off the vampire while the prince and his attendant flee towards the houses.

At this critical moment, Four-eyed and Yat-yau both decide to put aside their differences and focus on destroying the vampires.

== Cast ==
- Anthony Chan as Four-eyed Taoist (四目道長), a Taoist priest
- Wu Ma as Master Yat-yau (一休大師), a Buddhist monk
- Chin Ka-lok as Kar-lok (家樂), Four-eyed's student
- Rachel Lee as JīngJīng (菁菁), Yat-yau's student
- Yuen Wah as Attendant Wu (烏侍長), the prince's feminine personal attendant
- Pauline Wong as the Vixen Spirit, a demoness who tries to seduce Four-eyed
- Chung Fat as Taoist Crane (千鶴道長), Four-eyed's junior
- Hoh Kin-wai as the 71st Prince
- Cheung Wing-cheung as the Vampire
- Chun Kwai-bo as one of the prince's guards
- Chu Tau as one of the prince's guards
- Pang Yun-cheung as one of the prince's guards
- Ka Lee as one of Taoist Crane's students
- Chow Gam-kong as one of Taoist Crane's students
- Kwan Yung as one of Taoist Crane's students
- Lung Ying as a soldier

== Home media ==
=== VHS ===
Release date	Country	Classifaction	Publisher	Format	Language	Subtitles	Notes	REF
Unknown	United States	Unknown	Rainbow Audio and Video Incorporation	NTSC	Cantonese	English		

=== Laserdisc ===
Release date	Country	Classifaction	Publisher	Catalog No	Format	Language	Subtitles	Notes	REF
Unknown	Japan	N/A	Pioneer LDC		CLV / NTSC	Cantonese	Japanese	Audio Mono	
1989	Hong Kong	N/A	Unknown	SEL0133H89	CLV / NTSC	Cantonese	None	Audio: Stereo, 2 Sides	

=== VCD ===
Release date	Country	Classifaction	Publisher	Format	Language	Subtitles	Notes	REF
Unknown	Hong Kong	N/A	Deltamac (HK)	NTSC	Cantonese, Mandarin	English, Chinese	2 VCDs	
1 April 2000	Hong Kong	N/A	Joy Sales (HK)	NTSC	Cantonese, Mandarin	English, Traditional Chinese	2 VCDs	

=== DVD ===
Release date	Country	Classifaction	Publisher	Format	Region	Language	Sound	Subtitles	Notes	REF
Unknown	Japan	N/A	Universal Pictures Japan	NTSC	2	Cantonese, Japanese	Dolby Digital Mono	Japanese	Digitally Re-mastered Box-set	
19 December 2002	Hong Kong	N/A	Deltamac (HK)	NTSC	ALL	Cantonese, Mandarin	Dolby Digital	English, Chinese		
19 February 2004	France	N/A	HK Video	PAL	2	Cantonese	Dolby Digital	French	Box-set	
15 March 2008	Hong Kong	N/A	Joy Sales (HK)	NTSC	ALL	Cantonese, Mandarin	Dolby Digital 2.0	English, Traditional Chinese, Simplified Chinese		

=== Blu Ray ===
Release date	Country	Classifaction	Publisher	Format	Language	Subtitles	Notes	REF
22nd May 2023	United Kingdom	12 (the film is paired with another film, making the disc a 15)	Eureka Entertainment	N/A	Cantonese	English	Part of the Hopping Mad box set	
