= The Vanished Murderer =

2015 Chinese-Hong Kong film by Law Chi-leung

- Poster
- Chinese: 消失的凶手
- Directed by: Law Chi-leung
- Written by: Yeung Sin-Ling
- Produced by: Derek Yee; Mandy Law Hiu-Man
- Starring: Sean Lau; Gordon Lam; Li Xiaolu; Jiang Yiyan; Guo Xiaodong; Rhydian Vaughan; Alien Sun
- Cinematography: Edmond Fung Yuen-Man
- Edited by: Li Ka-Wing
- Music by: Chan Kwong-wing
- Production companies: Le Vision Pictures (Beijing); Le Vision Pictures (Hong Kong); Wuxian Yinghua Film Production; Film Unlimited
- Distributed by: Le Vision Pictures (Beijing); Distribution Workshop
- Release date: November 27, 2015 (China)
- Running time: 120 minutes
- Countries: China; Hong Kong
- Languages: Cantonese; Mandarin
- Box office: CN¥62.6 million (China)

The Vanished Murderer (Chinese: 消失的凶手; pinyin: Xiāoshī de Xiōngshōu) is a 2015 period suspense crime action thriller film directed by Law Chi-leung and the sequel to 2012's The Bullet Vanishes. A China-Hong Kong co-production, the film was released in China on November 27, 2015.

== Plot ==
At a women's prison in the Northern China in 1932, Prisoner Fu Yuan (Jiang Yiyan) digs a tunnel in her prison cell with a silver spoon and escapes. Inspector Song Donglu (Lau Ching-wan) is summoned to investigate Fu's escape, a case that is personal to Song as Fu was not only arrested by him but had also become his friend and confidant ever since being jailed, her advice helping him solve a seemingly paranormal serial killing case not long ago. By tracking down the letters sent to him by Fu, it sets Song off to Hong City to unravel the truth behind Fu's disappearance. At Hong City, Song found out from a police men that a village has been massacred by a private army owned by Gao Ming Xiong as the villagers are not willing to give their cotton due to low pay for the cotton. Fu uses the massacre to influence people that the private army will rob their money, and wanted the people to kill themselves to protest against the private army and draw attention from the people of the city.

== Cast ==
- Sean Lau
- Gordon Lam
- Li Xiaolu
- Jiang Yiyan
- Guo Xiaodong
- Rhydian Vaughan
- Alien Sun

== Reception ==
The film grossed US$6.32 million on its opening weekend at the Chinese box office.
