= The Private Eye Blues =

1994 Hong Kong film by Eddie Fong

- Film poster
- Traditional Chinese: 非常偵探
- Simplified Chinese: 非常侦探
- Hanyu Pinyin: Fēi Cháng Zhēn Tàn
- Jyutping: Fei1 Seong4 Zing1 Taam3
- Directed by: Eddie Fong
- Screenplay by: Eddie Fong
- Produced by: Teddy Robin
- Starring: Jacky Cheung; Kathy Chow; Mavis Fan
- Cinematography: Jingle Ma
- Edited by: Eddie Fong
- Music by: Teddy Robin; John Laudin; Michael Au
- Production company: Tedpoly Films
- Release date: 26 August 1994
- Running time: 106 minutes
- Country: Hong Kong
- Language: Cantonese
- Box office: HK$5,269,436

The Private Eye Blues is a 1994 Hong Kong crime film written, edited and directed by Eddie Fong and starring Jacky Cheung, Kathy Chow and Mavis Fan.

== Cast ==
- Jacky Cheung as Private Eye
- Frankie Chin
- Chin Ho
- Kathy Chow as Private Eye's wife
- Mavis Fan as Kiddy
- Lee Hiu-tung as Daughter
- Wong Tin-lam as Manliand boss
- Bobby Yip as Guy bumped in the street

== See also ==
- Jacky Cheung filmography
