= Jared Robinsen =

Australian actor and TV personality

- Born: November 1968 (age 56); Australia
- Occupation(s): Actor, television presenter

Jared Robinsen (born November 1968) is an Australian actor, best known for his role as Craig Maxwell in the television soap opera Sons and Daughters. He has appeared in many popular series including Baywatch, Sea Patrol and H_{2}O: Just Add Water and films The Condemned and The Chronicles of Narnia.

From 1987 to 1989 Jared Robinsen was one of three television presenters of the Network Ten magazine children's television program, Ridgey Didge in Australia.

From 2003 to 2005 Robinsen played the part of a nurse and birdwatcher in the Scottish/Australian paranormal series Jeopardy. His part in the children's show played a significant role in the kids finding their teacher who was being held in the hospital where Robinsen's character worked. Through finding the teacher and getting information from him, the kids had another piece of the puzzle and were a step closer to solving the mystery that the series is based upon. His latest role is in the television series K9.

== Film ==
Year	Title	Role	Other notes
2010	The Chronicles of Narnia: The Voyage of the Dawn Treader	Intake Officer	Produced by David Yates, directed by Michael Apted
2012	Tender	James	Produced by Liz Tomkins, directed by David Pawsey
2012	Viral Factor	Tyler	Produced by Candy Leung, directed by Dante Lam
