= The Viral Factor =

2012 Hong Kong-Chinese film by Dante Lam

- Official poster

Chinese name
- Traditional Chinese: 逆戰
- Simplified Chinese: 逆战
Transcriptions
Standard Mandarin
- Hanyu Pinyin: Nì Zhàn
Yue: Cantonese
- Jyutping: Jik6 Zin3
- Directed by: Dante Lam
- Screenplay by: Dante Lam; Jack Ng
- Story by: Candy Leung
- Produced by: Candy Leung; Albert Lee; Solon So; James Wang
- Starring: Jay Chou; Nicholas Tse
- Cinematography: Kenny Tse
- Edited by: Azrael Chung
- Music by: Peter Kam
- Production companies: Emperor Motion Pictures; Beijing Universe Starlight Culture Media; Huayi Brothers
- Distributed by: Emperor Motion Pictures
- Release date: 17 January 2012
- Running time: 122 minutes
- Countries: Hong Kong; China
- Languages: Cantonese; Mandarin; English; Malay
- Budget: HK$200 million
- Box office: HK$22,212,450 (Hong Kong) ¥127.01 million (China); US$25,414,221 (Worldwide)

The Viral Factor is a 2012 action film directed by Dante Lam and starring Jay Chou and Nicholas Tse. The supporting cast includes Lin Peng, Michelle Bai, Andy On, Carl Ng, Liu Kai-chi and Elaine Jin, with action choreographed by Dante Lam and Chin Kar-lok. A Hong Kong-Chinese co-production, the film was filmed from March 2011 to July 2011, and was theatrically released on January 17, 2012.

== Plot ==
IDC (International Defense Commission) agent Sean Wong (Andy On) and his team members are in Jordan on a dangerous mission to escort a scientist named Kenner Osama Muhammad, who has stolen a copy of the smallpox virus, to Norway. On the way out of the country, the convoy were ambushed by a group of assailants. It was later revealed that Sean has betrayed the team for his own agenda and shot his colleagues Jon Man (Jay Chou) and his girlfriend Ice (Michelle Bai). Sean then escapes with Kenner and the virus. The failed mission left Ice dead while Jon has a bullet lodged in his brain with no safe way to remove it and only two weeks to get his affairs in order before succumbing to permanent paralysis. Three months later, the crew of a freight ship on Malaysian waters was found to have been infected and killed by the smallpox virus. However this plan backfires when Kenner escapes only to killed accidentally by getting ran over by a random passerby truck, forcing Sean to make plans to intercept a replacement specialist. Elsewhere, Sean contacts an arms dealer called Tyler (Jared Robinson), and suggests to mutate the virus into a biological weapon, develop a vaccine and sell it to a corrupt pharmaceutical company. In Beijing, Jon returns home to spend his remaining days with his mother (Elaine Jin), who tells him that he has a long lost brother, Man Yeung (Nicholas Tse) whom she left behind with his father, Man Tin (Liu Kai Chi).

In Kuala Lumpur at a Malaysian court, Man Yeung is being charged for numerous crimes that he had committed. While being escorted to the prison, he attacks the police personnel and makes a successful escape. He later meets up with corrupt police officer Russell (Philip Keung), who aided in his escape from custody and was given a new job. On his flight to Malaysia, Jon meets Asian Centre for Disease Control and Prevention (ACDC) doctor Rachel Kan (Lin Peng), who was later abducted by Yeung after the plane landed. A suspicious Jon, who noticed that the car that Rachel was travelling in has a different driver from earlier, tails the vehicle and ended up being forced into the vehicle. Jon, unaware of Yeung's identity, puts up a fight against him and the other henchmen, causing the car to crash. Yeung escapes after a brief struggle with Jon. Later, Jon meets his father and Man's daughter, Cheung-sing, who shows him a newspaper article that the man he encountered earlier was his brother.

Meanwhile, Yeung and his goons breaks into Rachel's house, who holds her mother hostage and forces her to get a Carnot virus sample from the ACDC headquarters. The next day, while Yeung and Rachel are leaving the building after obtaining the virus sample, a security personnel triggers the alarm, causing a chase through the city. During the chaos several ACDC guards and Yeung's partners are killed and Rachel is re-captured by Mark (Sammy Hung), Sean's right hand man working with Russell. Yeung crashes the getaway vehicle and flees on foot but is pursued by Russell and his corrupt cops who want him silenced. He calls his father and tells him to bring Cheung-aing to meet him at the train station. Jon, who was nearby to meet up with Rachel, witnesses the event and join in the pursuit of Yeung. Working together, Jon and Yeung manages to hold off the corrupted police officers long enough for them to board a train to escape. Jon persuades Yeung to surrender himself but the two brothers got embroiled in a fist fight. They were later intercepted by the Russell and police at a train depot, where Tin sacrifices himself in order to let Yeung and Cheung-aing escape, but Cheung-aing was caught by a corrupt cop and Jon arrested by the police.

Russell then discovers that Jon and Yeung are brothers, and orders his men to kill Jon, who is at a hospital for a check-up. Yeung later follows Russell to a nightclub, who was meeting Sean. After being assaulted by Yeung to release his daughter, Russell escapes and runs to the road only to be knocked down by a bus, killing him instantly. At the hospital, Russell's men failed to kill Jon, who escapes after putting up a fight.

Next morning, Yeung goes to an abandoned building to bring the Carnot virus sample to Sean in exchange for his daughter. Rachel was then forced to combine the Carnot virus sample with the smallpox virus, which Sean later tries to test on Rachel's mother. Before it could be done however, Jon shows himself and holds Sean at gunpoint. Sean tries to dissuade Yeung from helping Jon by threatening his daughter's life. A police tactical team then storms the building, and in the confusion, Sean escapes with the virus. Jon then gives chase and when it appears that he has nowhere to run, Sean injects the virus into Yeung's daughter, who was placed inside a car. Sean, claiming to be the only person who has the antidote to the virus, tells Jon to bring Rachel to him in exchange for Cheung-sing. With Cheung-sing's life at stake, he was left with no choice but to let Sean go. Jon then gets into another car and picks up Yeung, who has been shot, before escaping together. That night, after removing the bullet, Jon and Yeung share their life stories together. However, the police moved into their hiding place. Yeung escapes while Jon stayed behind to surrender himself.

Later while being transferred to maximum security prison, Jon hijacks the helicopter he is in. Together with Yeung and Rachel, they escape via air and arrives at Sean's designated location. However, it turns out to be a trap when Mark, Sean's henchman appears and shoot Yeung before abducting Rachel. Jon spots Sean and gives chase while Yeung goes after Rachel, who is brought onto a ship to create the antidote to the virus.

Yeung encounters Mark dumping Cheung-sing's body into the sea and kills him in a fit of anger before jumping off the ship to retrieve his daughter. Jon arrives in time to help both of them get back onto the ship, and tells Yeung to commandeer the engine control room to stop the ship from starting while he looks for Rachel. After finding her and breaking her out, they are chased by Tyler and Sean, while Yeung easily disposes of Tyler's henchman Mike and several other henchmen. As Jon and Rachel attempt to flee, Sean then shoots and injures Rachel when they were attempt to cross a big gap. Jon eventually deals with the remaining henchmen but is pinned by Tyler who wields a machine gun. Jon manages to retrieve a revolver and shoot Tyler dead. In the final showdown, Sean pins down both Jon and Yeung. Jon, who is becoming weaker by the minute, knows his time is almost up and because only one of them can take down Sean, walks out to become a distraction allowing Yeung to shoot Sean dead.

In the aftermath, Yeung has surrendered to the IDC and goes to Beijing with Cheung-sing to visit his mother in a sign that shows he has forgiven her. The film ends with a narration by Jon that his family is his "everything" whose fate is left ambiguous.

== Cast ==
- Jay Chou as Jon Man (萬飛), an IDC agent and Ice's boyfriend and Ice's former fiancé.
- Nicholas Tse as Man Yeung (萬陽)
- Lin Peng as Rachel Kan (簡麗珊)
- Michelle Bai as Ice, an IDC agent and Jon's girlfriend and former fiancée.
- Andy On as Sean Wong (王尚恩), a rogue IDC Agent with intent to unleash a smallpox virus and profit from it by selling a vaccine.
- Carl Ng as Ross, an IDC Agent and Jon's by the book colleague.
- Liu Kai-chi as Man Tin (萬天), Jon and Man Yeung's father.
- Elaine Jin as Fung Ling (風玲), Jon and Man Yeung's mother.
- Sammy Hung as Mark, Sean's right hand henchman.
- Deep Ng (cameo) as Man Yeung's former partner.
- Philip Keung as Russell, a corrupt cop and IDC asset working for Sean.
- Crystal Lee as Man Cheung-sing (萬長勝), Man Yeung's daughter
- Jared Robinson as Gunther Tyler, an arms dealer who Sean plans to sell the virus to.
- Ron Smoorenburg as a henchman working for Tyler

== Production ==
With a HK$200 million budget, lead actors Jay Chou and Nicholas Tse had a combined insurance coverage of $150 million and 20 bodyguards to protect them. The budget also included RM70,000 for apartment rentals in Kuala Lumpur. The producers borrowed airplanes from the air force, tanks and other things to use during filming. Filming locations included Hong Kong, Xi'an, Middle East and Malaysia. Around 80% of the movie was filmed in Kuala Lumpur, Malaysia. In the movie, several scenes were shot in the compounds of International Medical University. One of the locations used in Malaysia was an abandoned construction site in Kuala Lumpur. Among them, the scene in a traffic jam was filmed at Jalan Raja Chulan, during long weekends and public holidays when fewer people would be in Kuala Lumpur. Principal photography started on 23 March 2011 and wrapped up on 7 July in the same year.

== Scenes filmed in Kuala Lumpur ==
- Kuala Lumpur Sentral 吉隆坡中环车站
- Pavilion KL 柏威年廣場
- Kuala Lumpur International Airport
- Mid Valley KTM Komuter Station
- Dang Wangi District Police HQ (Kuala Lumpur)
- Putrajaya
- Kuala Lumpur City Centre (KLCC)
- Old KTM railway station
- Petronas Towers

== Accolades ==
Accolades
Ceremony	Category	Recipient	Outcome
32nd Hong Kong Film Awards	Best Film	The Viral Factor	Nominated
32nd Hong Kong Film Awards	Best Director	Dante Lam	Nominated
32nd Hong Kong Film Awards	Best Supporting Actress	Elaine Jin	Nominated
32nd Hong Kong Film Awards	Best Cinematography	Kenny Tse	Nominated
32nd Hong Kong Film Awards	Best Film Editing	Chung Wai-chiu	Nominated
32nd Hong Kong Film Awards	Best Action Choreography	Dante Lam, Chin Kar-lok, Wong Fai-fai, Ng Hoi-tong	Nominated
32nd Hong Kong Film Awards	Best Sound Design	Kinson Tsang	Nominated
49th Golden Horse Awards	Best Actor	Nicholas Tse	Nominated
