= The Bullet Vanishes =

2012 Hong Kong-Chinese film by Lo Chi-leung

- Theatrical release poster
- Traditional Chinese: 消失的子彈
- Simplified Chinese: 消失的子弹
- Hanyu Pinyin: Xiāo Shī Dè Zǐ Dàn
- Jyutping: Siu1 Sat1 Di1 Zi2 Daan6
- Directed by: Lo Chi-leung
- Written by: Lo Chi-leung; Yeung Sin-ling
- Story by: Yeung Sin-ling
- Produced by: Derek Yee; Mandy Law; Zhang Zhao; Albert Lee; Shan Dongbing; Catherine Hun
- Starring: Nicholas Tse; Lau Ching-wan; Yang Mi; Boran Jing; Wu Gang; Liu Kai-chi
- Cinematography: Chan Chi-ying
- Edited by: Kong Chi-leung; Ron Chan
- Music by: Teddy Robin; Tommy Wai
- Production companies: Emperor Motion Pictures; Film Unlimited; LeVision Pictures
- Distributed by: Emperor Motion Pictures
- Release dates: 14 August 2012 (China); 13 September 2012 (Hong Kong)
- Running time: 108 minutes
- Countries: Hong Kong; China
- Languages: Mandarin; Cantonese
- Budget: US$15.8 million
- Box office: US$25.0 million (Worldwide)

The Bullet Vanishes (also known as Ghost Bullets and Disappeared Bullets) is a 2012 mystery film. A Hong Kong-Chinese co-production, the film was written by Yeung Sin-leung and directed by Lo Chi-leung, produced by Mandy Law and Derek Yee, and starring Nicholas Tse, Lau Ching-wan, Yang Mi, Boran Jing, Wu Gang and Liu Kai-chi. The film concerns a detective duo investigating a series of strange murders, in which the bullets used seemingly vanish (and hence the title), after the death of a factory girl accused as the perpetrator of the theft of a few bullets. Set in 1930s Tiancheng County, China, filming took place in Shanghai. Grossing US$25,280,000 in ticket sales domestically in China, The Bullet Vanishes is the eighth-highest-grossing Chinese film of 2012. The film was followed by a sequel, The Vanished Murderer, in 2015.

== Plot ==
Ding (Liu Kai-chi), the overbearing owner of a bullet factory in Tiancheng County, intimidates his workers to keep them in line, leading to a public Russian roulette "suicide" of a female employee (Xuxu) accused of stealing a box of bullets. A curse relating to a certain "Phantom Bullet" is found written in red on the walls of the factory, though the workers are soon ordered to scrub it off. Subsequent deaths from "phantom bullets" which are never found, seemingly vanishing, suggest that the factory has really been cursed. Song Donglu (Lau Ching-wan), a newly promoted detective with a slightly eccentric personality, is summoned by Tiancheng's police chief Jin (Wu Gang) to assist Guo Zhui (Nicholas Tse), "the fastest gunman in Tiancheng", and novice policeman Xiaowu (Boran Jing) in investigating the peculiar murders.

== Cast ==
- Nicholas Tse as Captain Guo Zhui, a gunman, detective and Song's partner.
- Lau Ching-wan as Inspector Song Donglu, a prison superintendent, forensic investigator and expert in criminal psychology.
- Yang Mi as Little Lark, a fortuneteller.
- Liu Kai-chi as Boss Ding, the owner of a bullet factory in Tiancheng County.
- Boran Jing as Xiaowu, a novice policeman working with Song and Guo.
- Yumiko Cheng as Li Jia, a coroner.
- Wang Ziyi as Wang Hai, an employee at the bullet factory.
- Wu Gang (actor) as Jin, the local police chief of Tiancheng County.
- Xuxu as Yan, the employee at the bullet factory who was forced to commit suicide by Boss Ding.
- Liu Yang as Chen Qi, a foreman of Boss Ding's.
- Jiang Yiyan as Fu Yuan, a woman convicted of killing her husband.
- Chin Kar-lok as Fu Yuan's husband.
- Gao Hu as a high-ranking police officer.
- Johnson Yuen
- Benz Kong
- Lu Kai

== Critical reception ==
As of 23 October 2012, on the review aggregator Rotten Tomatoes, the film had received a 92% "fresh" rating from 12 reviews, with an average of 6.9/10. On Metacritic, it had an average score of 65 out of 100, based on 4 reviews.

The Bullet Vanishes generally received favourable reviews from contemporary film critics, with Frank Scheck of The Hollywood Reporter commenting that the thriller "boasts a fiendishly clever plot and gorgeous production elements". Chuck Bowen of Slant Magazine praised the film for being "an effective tonic for summer-movie fatigue". Simon Foster of SBS gave The Bullet Vanishes 3 stars, out of 5, praising its engagement. straight.com's Ken Eisner said that it was a "strikingly beautiful detective thriller" and that it hit most of its marks. Robert Abele of the Los Angeles Times was one to give a negative review, concluding that it had "no story but lots of action" and was "visually stunning but emotionally empty", slamming the "over-abundance of visual pizazz". Many critics felt that The Bullet Vanishes had been influenced by the 2009 film Sherlock Holmes directed by Guy Ritchie, in particular the pairing of Song and Guo has been compared with that of Sherlock Holmes and Dr Watson.

== Box office ==
The Bullet Vanishes earned HK$8,016,951 at the Hong Kong box office.

The Bullet Vanishes was officially released in North America on 31 August 2012. According to Box Office Mojo, The Bullet Vanishes domestically grossed US$43,444 in its opening weekend, and has grossed US$117,629 as of 27 September 2012.

== Accolades ==
Award	Date of ceremony	Category	Recipients and nominees	Result
49th Golden Horse Film Festival and Awards	November 24, 2012	Best Feature Film	The Bullet Vanishes	Nominated
49th Golden Horse Film Festival and Awards	November 24, 2012	Best Costume Design	Cheung Sai-kit	Won
9th Huading Awards	April 10, 2013	Best Actor	Nicholas Tse	Won
9th Huading Awards	April 10, 2013	Best Screenplay	Lo Chi-leung, Yeung Sin-ling	Won
32nd Hong Kong Film Awards	April 13, 2013	Best Film	The Bullet Vanishes	Nominated
32nd Hong Kong Film Awards	April 13, 2013	Best Director	Lo Chi-leung	Nominated
32nd Hong Kong Film Awards	April 13, 2013	Best Screenplay	Lo Chi-leung, Yeung Sin-ling	Nominated
32nd Hong Kong Film Awards	April 13, 2013	Best Actor	Lau Ching-wan	Nominated
32nd Hong Kong Film Awards	April 13, 2013	Best Supporting Actor	Liu Kai-chi	Nominated
32nd Hong Kong Film Awards	April 13, 2013	Best Supporting Actress	Jiang Yiyan	Nominated
32nd Hong Kong Film Awards	April 13, 2013	Best Original Film Score	Teddy Robin, Tommy Wai	Nominated
32nd Hong Kong Film Awards	April 13, 2013	Best Sound Design	Phyllis Cheng	Nominated
32nd Hong Kong Film Awards	April 13, 2013	Best Cinematography	Chan Chi-ying	Nominated
32nd Hong Kong Film Awards	April 13, 2013	Best Film Editing	Kong Chi-leung, Ron Chan	Nominated
32nd Hong Kong Film Awards	April 13, 2013	Best Art Direction	Silver Cheung, Lee Kin-wai	Nominated
32nd Hong Kong Film Awards	April 13, 2013	Best Costume & Make Up Design	Silver Cheung	Nominated

== See also ==
- Chinese films of 2012
