= Motorway (film) =

2012 Hong Kong film by Soi Cheang

- Film poster
- Directed by: Cheang Pou-soi
- Screenplay by: Joey O'Bryan; Szeto Kam-Yuen; Francis Fung
- Story by: Joey O'Bryan
- Produced by: Johnnie To
- Starring: Shawn Yue; Anthony Wong; Guo Xiaodong
- Cinematography: Fung Yuen-man; Tse Chung-to
- Edited by: David Richardson; Allen Leung
- Music by: Alex Gopher; Xavier Jamaux
- Production companies: Media Asia Films; Sil-Metropole Organisation; Milkyway Image
- Distributed by: Media Asia Distribution
- Release date: 21 June 2012
- Running time: 90 minutes
- Country: Hong Kong
- Languages: Cantonese; Mandarin
- Box office: HK$14,766,493

Motorway (Chinese: 車手) is a 2012 Hong Kong action film directed by Cheang Pou-soi and starring Shawn Yue, Anthony Wong and Guo Xiaodong.

== Cast ==
- Shawn Yue as Cheung
- Anthony Wong as Lo
- Guo Xiaodong as Sun
- Gordon Lam as Chong
- Barbie Hsu as Yee
- Josie Ho as Wei
- Michelle Ye as Mrs. Lo

== Reception ==
=== Critical reception ===
Variety's Maggie Lee wrote, "Cruising pleasantly until a gripping midfilm turning point, the pic only goes full-throttle in the final payoff, with car chases designed to impress the discerning. To's fans and Asian markets will drive sales traffic."

=== Accolades ===
Year	Ceremony	Category	Nominee(s)	Result	Ref
2012	Golden Horse Awards	Best Action Choreography	Chin Ka-lok, Wong Wai-fai, Ng Hoi-tong	Won	
2013	Hong Kong Film Awards	Best Film	Motorway	Nominated	
2013	Hong Kong Film Awards	Best Director	Cheang Pou-soi	Nominated	
2013	Hong Kong Film Awards	Best Film Editing	David Richardson, Allen Leung	Nominated	
2013	Hong Kong Film Awards	Best Action Choreography	Chin Ka-lok, Wong Wai-fai, Ng Hoi-tong	Nominated	
2013	Hong Kong Film Awards	Best Sound Design	Benny Chu, Steve Miller	Nominated	
2013	Hong Kong Film Awards	Best Visual Effects	Law Wai-ho, Hellowing Cheung	Nominated	
