= The Silent War (2012 film) =

2012 Chinese-Hong Kong film by Alan Mak and Felix Chong

- Theatrical release poster
- Traditional Chinese: 聽風者
- Simplified Chinese: 听风者
- Directed by: Alan Mak; Felix Chong
- Written by: Alan Mak; Felix Chong
- Based on: Plot Against by Mai Jia
- Produced by: Ronald Wong; Charley Zhuo
- Starring: Tony Leung; Zhou Xun; Mavis Fan; Wang Xuebing
- Cinematography: Anthony Pun
- Edited by: Curran Pang
- Music by: Chan Kwong-wing
- Production companies: Mei Ah Film Production; Pop Movies
- Distributed by: Mei Ah Entertainment
- Release date: 10 August 2012
- Running time: 120 minutes
- Countries: China; Hong Kong
- Languages: Mandarin; Cantonese
- Box office: $38.5 million

The Silent War is a 2012 spy thriller film directed by Alan Mak and Felix Chong. A Chinese-Hong Kong co-production adapted from the novel Plot Against written by Mai Jia, it follows a recruit with extrasensory perception working for a government unit tasked with stopping an "invisible enemy".

The Silent War won Best Cinematography at the 32nd Hong Kong Film Awards.

== Plot ==
He Bing is a blind street hustler with an extraordinary gift, superhuman hearing, which he uses to get by. On October 8, 1951, the mysterious Unit 701 suddenly discovers that all enemy radio stations have vanished, prompting an urgent need for elite listeners. Recognizing the unique value of He Bing's abilities, Zhang Xuening is sent to bring him into 701, hoping he will serve the newly founded People's Republic of China.

He Bing helps 701 locate all enemy transmissions and, in the process, finds the woman he loves and marries her. Zhang Xuening even brings in a renowned doctor to cure He Bing's blindness. However, during a critical listening mission, a mistake on He Bing's part leads to Zhang Xuening's death. Overwhelmed with grief, He Bing blinds himself once again on a rainy night. In doing so, his hearing becomes even more acute, allowing him to help 701 rediscover the enemy radio stations once more.

== Cast ==
- Tony Leung as He Bing
- Zhou Xun as Zhang Xuening
- Mavis Fan as Shen Jing
- Wang Xuebing as Guo Xingzhong
- Dong Yong as Wu Chang
- Carrie Ng as Mrs Li
- Pal Sinn as Luo Saner
- Lam Wai as Captain Yang
- Tang Qun as Mother He
- Jacob Cheung as Sparrow
- Zhang Haiyan as Mrs. Ma

== Awards and nominations ==
32nd Hong Kong Film Awards

- Nominated: Best Screenplay (Alan Mak & Felix Chong)
- Nominated: Best Actor (Tony Leung Chiu-Wai)
- Nominated: Best Actress (Zhou Xun)
- Nominated: Best Supporting Actress (Mavis Fan)
- Won: Best Cinematography (Anthony Pun)
- Nominated: Best Art Direction (Man Lim Chung)
- Nominated: Best Costume & Make Up Design (Man Lim Chung)
- Nominated: Best Original Film Score (Chan Kwong Wing)

Golden Horse Awards

- Nominated: Best Art Direction (Man Lim Chung)
- Nominated: Best Makeup & Costume Design (Man Lim Chung)
- Nominated: Best Sound Effects (Traithep Wongpaiboon, Nopawat Likitwong)
- Nominated: Best Supporting Actress (Mavis Fan)

Asian Film Awards

- Won: Best Costume Designer (Man Lim Chung)
- Nominated: Best Production Designer (Man Lim Chung)

Asia Pacific Film Awards

- Won: Best Sound Effects (Traithep Wongpaiboon, Nopawat Likitwong)

Huading Awards

- Won: Best Supporting Actress (Mavis Fan)
