= The Great Magician =

2011 Hong Kong film by Derek Yee

- Film poster
- Directed by: Derek Yee
- Written by: Derek Yee; Chun Tin-nam; Lau Ho-leung
- Produced by: Peggy Lee; Mandy Law
- Starring: Tony Leung; Sean Lau; Zhou Xun
- Cinematography: Kita Nobuyasu
- Edited by: Kwong Chi-leung
- Music by: Leon Ko
- Production companies: Emperor Motion Pictures; Bona Film Group; Bona Entertainment; Film Unlimited
- Distributed by: Emperor Motion Pictures
- Release dates: 22 December 2011 (China); 12 January 2012 (Hong Kong)
- Running time: 128 minutes
- Countries: Hong Kong; China
- Language: Mandarin
- Box office: US$27.32 million

The Great Magician (大魔术师; 大魔術師; dà móshù shī) is a 2011 Hong Kong action fantasy comedy film based on a 2009 novel by Zhang Haifan. It was directed by Derek Yee and starred Tony Leung, Sean Lau and Zhou Xun. Set in Beijing in the 1920s, the film tells the story of an illusionist who returns from overseas to find his fiancée, who has been kidnapped by a warlord hoping to make her his seventh wife.

== Plot ==
The film is set in Beijing in the 1920s during the Warlord Era after the fall of the Qing dynasty. Liu Kunshan, a butler working for the warlord Lei Bully, uses magic tricks to scare convicts into joining the warlord's army. Although he already has six wives, Lei has kidnapped Liu Yin and hopes that she will willingly become his seventh wife.

Chang Hsien, a magician, shows up in town and bedazzles the locals with his tricks. He is secretly collaborating with a group of spies working for the Republican government to lure Lei into attending a performance and take the warlord hostage. Chang's true motive for participating in the plot is to win back the heart of Liu Yin, his fiancée whom he had left behind before going abroad. Chang is also an apprentice of Liu Wanyao, Liu Yin's father, who has been imprisoned by Liu Kunshan, who wants to force Liu Wanyao to teach him a secret magic trick.

Chang reunites with Liu Yin during his magic show and wants to run away with her, but she refuses because she is worried that her father will be killed and because she now has doubts about Chang. Lei and Chang strike up an uncanny friendship, and Lei pretends not to know even when he has managed to deduce that Chang is Liu Yin's fiancé and that Liu Yin still has feelings for Chang.

Later, Chang discovers that Liu Kunshan is secretly working with imperial loyalists to restore the Qing dynasty, with support from a Japanese paramilitary group. Lei catches Liu Kunshan having an affair with his third wife, but lets them go. After his cover is blown, Liu Kunshan openly sides with the Qing loyalists and Japanese, and leads a mutiny against Lei, catching him off guard. During the mutiny, Chang uses magic to trick everyone into thinking that Lei and Liu Yin have perished in a fire.

Chang, now captured by Liu Kunshan, is forced to perform a ritual in the theatre to help the Qing loyalists and Japanese raise an army to restore the Qing dynasty, or else his master, Liu Wanyao, will be executed. During the ceremony, Chang plays a movie and a tank rolls out from the screen. Lei and Liu Yin are revealed to have survived, and Lei's soldiers surround the theatre. Chang saves Liu Wanyao, and all the Qing loyalists and Japanese are either killed or captured.

In the aftermath, Lei disbands his army to become a weapons researcher, while Chang wants to travel to Europe to learn filmmaking. Liu Yin decides not to choose either Lei or Chang, and both of them agree to fairly compete to win her heart.

== Cast ==
- Tony Leung as Chang Hsien
- Sean Lau as Lei Bully (Lei Da-niu)
- Zhou Xun as Liu Yin
- Yan Ni as Lei's third wife
- Wu Gang as Liu Kunshan
- Kenya Sawada as Mitearai
- Alex Fong as Chen Kuo
- Paul Chun as Liu Wanyao
- Lam Suet as Li Feng-jen
- Wang Ziwen as Li Jiao
- Wang Ziyi as Li Yi
- Daniel Wu as Captain Tsai
- Berg Ng as Tuozi
- Morris Rong as a warlord
- Vincent Kok as a warlord
- Tsui Hark as a warlord

== Awards and nominations ==
32nd Hong Kong Film Awards

- Nominated: Best Actress (Zhou Xun)
- Nominated: Best Costume Make Up Design (Yee Chung-man and Jessie Dai)
