= The Guillotines =

2012 Chinese-Hong Kong film by Andrew Lau

- Film poster

Chinese name
- Traditional Chinese: 血滴子
- Simplified Chinese: 血滴子
Transcriptions
Standard Mandarin
- Hanyu Pinyin: Xiě Dī Zǐ / Xuè Dī Zǐ
Yue: Cantonese
- Jyutping: Hyut3 Dik1 Zi2
- Directed by: Andrew Lau
- Screenplay by: Jojo Hui; Joyce Chan; Aubrey Lam; Philip Lui; Guo Junli; Peter Tsi
- Produced by: Peter Chan; Andrew Lau; Jojo Hui
- Starring: Mark Huang; Ethan Juan; Shawn Yue; Chris Lee; Bobo Jing
- Cinematography: Edmond Fung
- Edited by: Azrael Chung
- Music by: Chan Kwong-wing
- Production companies: Stellar Megamedia Group; We Pictures
- Release date: 20 December 2012
- Running time: 112 minutes
- Countries: China; Hong Kong
- Language: Mandarin
- Budget: US$15,000,000

The Guillotines is a 2012 wuxia drama film directed by Andrew Lau, starring Huang Xiaoming, Ethan Juan, Shawn Yue, Li Yuchun and Jing Boran. A Chinese-Hong Kong co-production, it is a remake of the 1975 Shaw Brothers film Flying Guillotine.

== Plot ==
During the Manchu-ruled Qing Dynasty, the Yongzheng Emperor established a secret assassination squad known as the "Guillotines" to eliminate all who posed a threat to him. Once heavily favored by the emperor, the Guillotines are deemed expendable once the Qianlong Emperor ascends to the throne and adopts Western ideas and technology. To consolidate his power under a new regime, the Qianlong Emperor continues to use the Guillotines to persecute the conquered Han Chinese in a reign of terror and oppression. The current guillotine squad is led by master fighter Leng and it consists of six young warriors: Musen, Houjia Shisan, Chen Tai, Hutu, Su and Buka. Serving the Qing court unquestioningly, they have never failed in 348 missions to eliminate their targets. However, their most recent mission would make it their last.

The Hans have been oppressed by their Manchurian-ruled government, causing social unrest and internal conflicts. Tian-Lang (Wolf), is the charismatic prophetic Han rebel leader of a group known as the Herders. Wolf is captured alive by Leng, telling Leng he is destined to kill him, but not at this place and time. Wolf is scheduled for execution the following day, however, his gang ambushes the execution parade and fends off both the Guillotines and the Green Army; allowing Wolf to escape, but Bai-Lan (Herders member) was captured. In the chaos of fighting, Wolf takes Musen (the only female member of the Guillotines) hostage in hopes to exchange back Bai-Lan. The Guillotines are dispatched to recover both Musen and finish off Wolf.

With reports that Wolf has fled to the outer frontiers, the squad tracks the Herders to a remote village outpost, heavily occupied by Han and smallpox-diseased inhabitants. Added to the mission, the Qianlong Emperor (who favors advanced weaponry over antiquated assassins) sends his most trusted agent, Haidu (secret sworn brother to Leng and right-hand man to the emperor) for the same mission. Unknown to the Guillotines, the emperor wants to absolve his legacy as the Guillotines is a living taint to his rule; they must be erased. Although Leng knows of the emperor's intentions and also wanted to help end the Guillotines, the group has become a family to him and has trouble eliminating them. Therefore, Haidu was also sent there to finish the mission that Leng didn't have the heart to do; resulting in a definitive moment during their exchange and that the Guillotines would not last.

At the exchange site, the Han and the Herders appeared in a display of unity and force, there to complete the exchange of prisoners when Haidu dispatches his rifle attack squadron on both the Guillotines and the Herders; as Bai-Lan is killed. Shocked at the attack on his own teammates, Leng resists Haidu in open defiance to the emperor's will, making him an enemy target as well; both the Guillotines and Herders survive the attack and escape to safety. Confused as to what has happened, Leng reveals his real identity to the Guillotines. The team, furious, know Leng is here to finish them off, but he tells his team to scatter and survive.

The government officially declares the Guillotines as wanted criminals in league with the Herders. Publicly forsaken by their own emperor and given a huge bounty upon their heads, the Guillotines are cruelly killed off one by one. Saddened and enraged, Leng confronts Haidu and called him a "lap dog," infuriating him to shove Leng down a cliff. He survives and is nursed back to health by Wolf in a peaceful secluded village. Confused as to why he was saved, Wolf did it out of mercy; to Leng's surprise, he found Musen as part of the village. Musen no longer wanted to be a Guillotine (after learning the cruelty the Guillotines had caused to Wolf's family) and lives there as a villager. After talking with Wolf, Leng finally admits he is secretly Han Chinese. Leng tells Wolf that it was the former emperor who chose him to be the right-hand man for the Qianlong Emperor and his Han identity was replaced with a Manchurian one. Although Leng is now on Wolf's side, Wolf prophesies his death will be imminent.

During the final battle, Haidu arrives with a large attack force to destroy Wolf and Leng, with the village was evacuated ahead of time. Musen volunteers chose to remain to defend the village and help the others escape. Haidu's army uses guns and cannons; rendering the village defenses useless against the might of ballistics. Ufortunately, Musen is gunned down. Leng sadly finds Musen dying and mourns for her death. Haidu completely decimates the Han village and finds Leng on a mountain edge with Wolf. Believing his time had come, Wolf asked Leng to relay a message of peace to the emperor and welcomes Leng to end his life. With the death of Wolf by Leng's hands, Haidu and Leng return to the palace with honor.

Back at the palace, Wolf's head is displayed as proof of the rebellion's defeat; with both Leng and Haidu received praises from the emperor, believing his golden age shall come. However, Leng uncharacteristically tells the Qianlong Emperor the reason for rebellion: there is neither prosperity nor happiness with the public; and the emperor's vision of a golden age would be hindered. Heeding the emperor, Leng reminds him that he must make peace and relieve the suffering of the people to sustain his vision. When asked if he would be there when it arrives, Leng points out the emperor wishes to erase the shameful past legacies and that would mean his life as well, since he is last Guillotine. Despite his earlier actions, Haidu tries to stop Leng from choosing death, but Leng remains insistent. With a sad reluctance, the emperor has Leng executed; the epilogue reveals that the Qianlong Emperor was one of the longest running rulers and held peace between the Manchurian and Han, but there was no historic mention of the Guillotines during his reign.

== Cast ==
- Huang Xiaoming as Tianlang (Wolf)
- Ethan Juan as Leng
- Shawn Yue as Haidu
- Li Yuchun as Musen
- Jing Boran as Houjia Shisan
- Wen Zhang as the Qianlong Emperor
- Purba Rygal as Chen Tai
- Andrew Lau as Emperor Yongzheng
- Jimmy Wang as Gong E
- Li Meng as Bai Lan
- Gao Tian as Hutu
- Zhou Yiwei as Buka
- Guan Xiaotong as young Musen

== Production ==
The film began shooting in September 2011 and finished editing in April 2012. The conversion to 3D format was handled by Canadian visual effects company Vision Globale.

This is Li Yuchun's third time as a female action hero. She previously performed in Bodyguards and Assassins (2009) and The Flying Swords of Dragon Gate (2011).

Wang Luodan originally played Tianlang's lover in a cameo. A month into shooting her scenes, Wang's character was replaced and her scenes were subsequently cut.
