= Romancing in Thin Air =

2012 Hong Kong-Chinese film by Johnnie To

- Film poster
- Directed by: Johnnie To
- Written by: Wai Ka-Fai; Yau Nai-Hoi; Ryker Chan; Jevons Au
- Produced by: Johnnie To; Wai Ka-Fai; Zhang Guoli; Shi Dongming; John Chong
- Starring: Louis Koo; Sammi Cheng
- Cinematography: Cheng Siu-Keung
- Edited by: David Richardson; Allen Leung
- Music by: Guy Zerafa
- Distributed by: Media Asia Films
- Release date: 9 February 2012
- Running time: 111 minutes
- Countries: Hong Kong; China
- Languages: Mandarin, Cantonese

Romancing in Thin Air (高海拔之戀 II; lit. "High-Altitude Romance II") is a 2012 contemporary romantic drama film directed by Johnnie To, and starring Louis Koo and Sammi Cheng. A Hong Kong-Chinese co-production, the film was released in both Hong Kong and mainland China on 9 February 2012.

== Plot ==
While onstage to receive an acting award, Hong Kong screen idol Michael Lau (Louis Koo) proposes to his mainland Chinese co-star, Ding Yuanyuan (Gao Yuanyuan). At the paparazzi-packed wedding reception, however, the bride runs away with her first love, coal miner Zhang Xing (Wang Baoqiang).

Michael goes on an alcoholic bender and, by chance, tumbles into the back of a truck bound for Shangri-La County, in north-west Yunnan province, China. At Deep Woods Hotel, a ranch-style guesthouse 3,800 metres up in the mountains, the lovelorn Michael falls seriously ill with altitude sickness and is nursed back to health by the owner Sue (Sammi Cheng) and the local doctor (Tien Niu).

Sue was a onetime art student from Hong Kong who worked there while studying in China and fell in love with both the place and its owner, Yang Xiaotian (Li Guangjie). Seven years earlier, Xiaotian went into the vast forest surrounding the guesthouse to rescue a young boy and never returned. Hoping that he is still alive, Sue continues to run the place with two assistants.

Michael sobers up and discovers that Sue was once an early member of his international fan club. A flashback reveals a parallel romance in which Michael was instrumental in bringing Tian and Sue together. The two bond. Meanwhile, Michael's manager, Barbara (Huang Yi), is still anxiously trying to trace him. One day, a ragged rucksack belonging to Xiaotian is found in the forest, and Sue's hopes rise that her husband is still alive.

== Cast ==
- Louis Koo as Liu Baiqian / Michael Liu
- Sammi Cheng as Sau / Sue
- Li Guangjie as Yang Xiaotian
- Gao Yuanyuan as Ding Yuanyuan
- Wang Baoqiang as Zhang Xing
- Huang Yi as Barbara, Michael's manager
- Tien Niu as doctor
- Wilfred Lau as Xiaolei, Barbara's assistant
- Yang Yi as Sue's chubby assistant / Teeny
- Sun Jiayi as Sue's taller assistant / Beauty
- Fu Chuanjie as priest
- Li Haitao as search party leader
- Chan Kung as mechanic
- Ji Chen as Xiaotian, in film
- Yang Zhongliang as grandfather, in film
- Zhao Yinlou as grandmother, in film
- Gesanglamu as Xiaoliang's sister, in film
- Hung Wai-leung as Michael's assistant
- Mak Kai-kwong as commercials director
- Calvin Lam as reporter
- Elanie Tsang as reporter
- Lo Kim-wah as film's executive director
- Fu Shusheng as grandfather
- Xu Feifei as grandmother
- Li Qiuer as Xiaoliang's sister
- Jiang Binshen as professor

== Reception ==
Maggie Lee of Variety wrote: "A superstar and his erstwhile fan develop a high-concept romance when thrown together in an inn two-and-a-half miles above sea level in Johnnie To's gorgeous-looking escapist [melodrama]". Lee compared it to his previous film "Don't Go Breaking My Heart" calling Romancing in Thin Air "still overwrought but less calculated than the earlier effort" and wrote it would likely appeal to Valentine's Day audiences but not to To's action or arthouse fans.
