= Chin Ka-lok =

Hong Kong actor and action choreographer

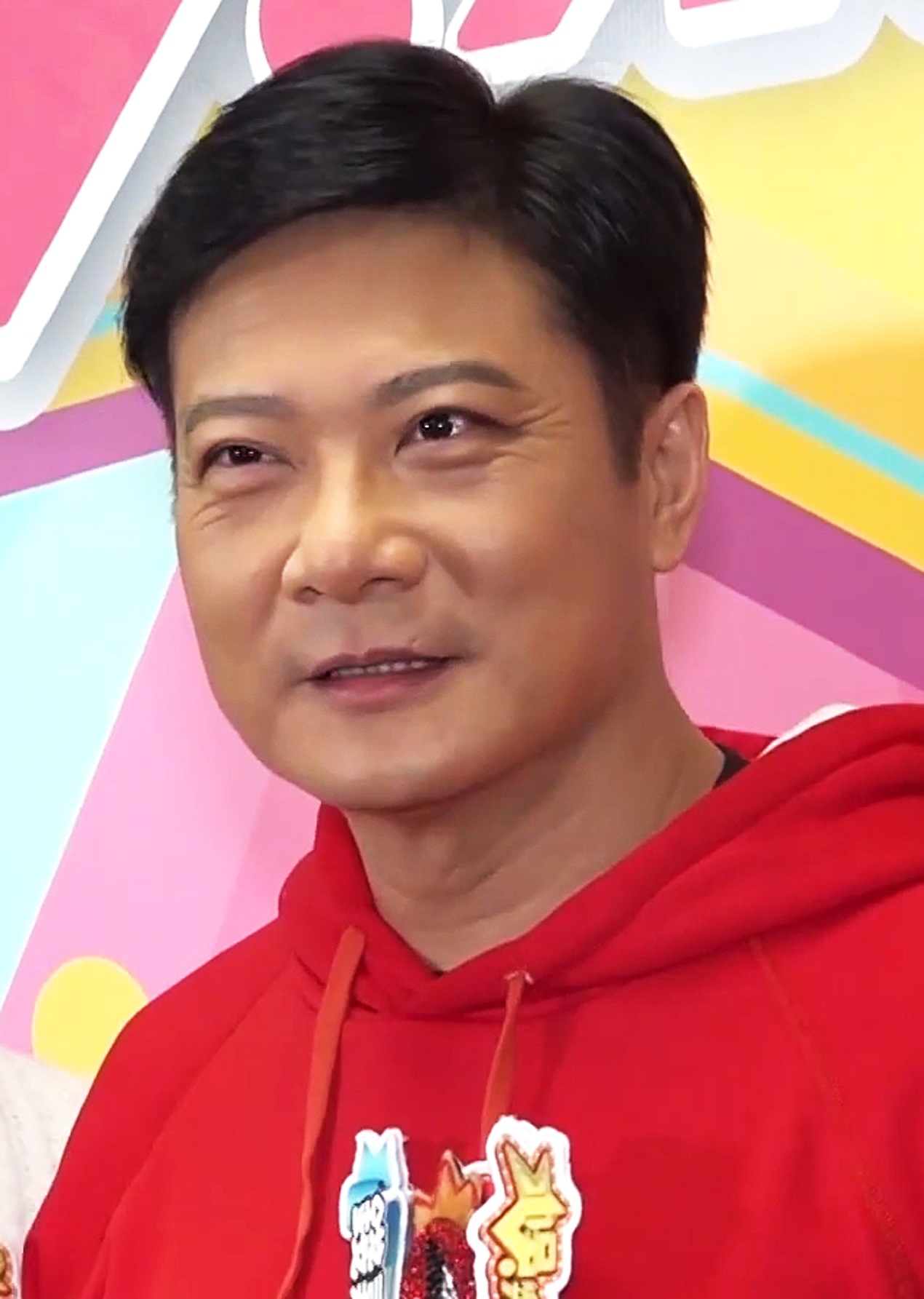
- Chin in 2019
- Born: 6 August 1965 (age 61); Hong Kong
- Years active: 1985-present
- Spouse: Angela Tong (m. 2012)
- Children: Alyssa Chin (b.2013); Kassidy Chin (b.2015)
- Awards: Golden Bauhinia Awards – Best Supporting Actor; 1996 Full Throttle Golden Horse Awards – Best Action Choreography; 2012 Motorway TVB Anniversary Awards – Most Improved Artiste; 1998 The Super Trio Show; My Favourite On-Screen Partners (Non-Dramas); 1998 The Super Trio Show; 1999 The Super Trio Mega Show; 2001 The Super Trio Show Series 2; 2004 The Super Trio Continues; Best Presenter; 2009 The Super Trio Supreme; Outstanding Artist Award; 2012

Signature
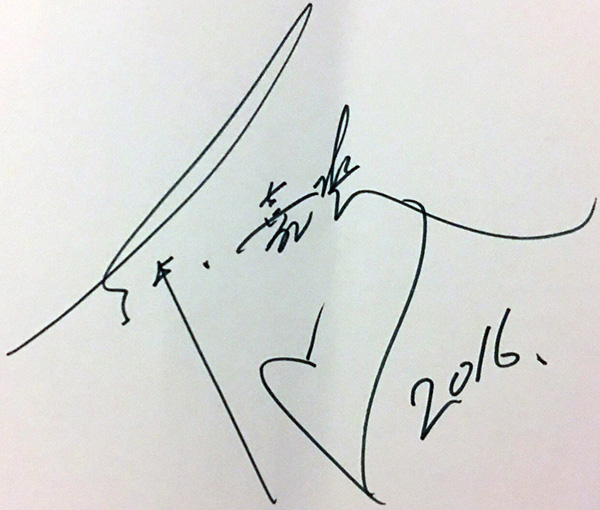

Chin Ka-lok, sometimes credited as Chin Kar-lok (Chinese: 錢嘉樂, Pinyin: Qián Jiālè, born 6 August 1965), is a Hong Kong actor, action choreographer, and television presenter.

Chin was born in Hong Kong, the younger brother of actor and stunt performer Chin Siu Ho. He is a former member of Sammo Hung's stunt team. Chin began working as a stuntman at the age of 16.

In 1985, he made his film debut in Sammo Hung's Heart of Dragon as one of Jackie Chan's SWAT Team buddies. In 1988, Chin replaced his brother Siu Ho in the 4th installment of Mr. Vampire. After starring in The Green Hornet and Drunken Master II in 1994, he began doing non-action roles alongside action roles. In 1995, he played a demon destroyer/centipede demon/scholar in Journey to the West. In 1997, he directed his only film, 97 Aces Go Places.

Aside from films, he is the co-host of The Super Trio Show, a Hong Kong variety show, along with Jerry Lamb and Eric Tsang.

As a fan of cars and racing, he starred in a comedic short as a street racer/drifter. However, when he took part in a 2005 TVB telethon, he performed donuts in the same 350Z as seen in the film with Lee San San standing in the center as a cone. Then in 2003 he starred the film Star Runner as "Senior Ho", a veteran fighter for the team Kong Ching.

== Filmography ==
=== Film ===
- Gang of Four (1978)
- Island of Virgins (1978)
- Leung mooi zai (1982)
- The 82 Tenants (1982)
- Man tian shen fo (1983)
- Fast Fingers (1983)
- Project A (1983) as Coast Policeman
- Shen yong shuang xiang pao (1984) as Sha's Thug
- Hong Kong 1941 (1984) as Minor Role
- Wheels on Meals (1984) as Motorcycle Punk (uncredited)
- The Owl vs Bombo (1984) as Thug in Alley
- My Lucky Stars (1985) as Gang Thug
- Mr. Boo Meets Pom Pom (1985) as Cop
- Those Merry Souls (1985) as Beach Thug
- Twinkle, Twinkle, Lucky Stars (1985) as Warehouse Thug #1 / Thai Assassin #2
- Heart of Dragon (1985) as SWAT Team Member / Log
- Ghost Festival (1985)
- Yes, Madam (1985) as Tin's Thug
- Righting Wrongs (1986)
- Millionaires Express (1986) as Kar Lok
- Sworn Brothers (1987) as Ka-lok
- Eastern Condors (1987) as Nguyen Siu-tran
- Paper Marriage (1988) as Whits Suit's Thug
- Dragons Forever (1988) as Bar Thug (uncredited)
- Three Against the World (1988) as Ming
- Mr. Vampire IV (1988) as Chia-Lok
- The Banquet (1991)
- Bury Me High (1991) as Wisely
- The Tantana (1991) as Dragon
- Swordsman II (1992) as Sarutobi Kazuki
- Operation Scorpio (1992) as Yu Shu
- Great Hero from China (1992) as Lok
- Night Life Hero (1992) as Peter
- Martial Arts Master Wong Fei Hung (1992) as Wong Fei Hung
- Moon Warriors (1992) as 13th Prince's bodyguard
- Vengeance of Six Dragons (1992) as 5th brother
- Fighting Fist (1992) as Teddy Wong
- Lady Killer (1992)
- Once Upon a Time in China IV (1993) as Duen Tin-lui
- The Avenging Quartet (1993) as Paul
- Hero Dream (1993)
- On Parole (1993) as Sing
- We're No Heroes (1994)
- Drunken Master II (1994) as Fo-sang
- The Green Hornet (1994) as Dong / The Green Hornet
- Kung Fu Kid (a.k.a. Shaolin Heroes) (1994) as Feng Shi-Yu a young fighter
- Switch-Over (1994)
- Burden of Proof (1994)
- Thunderbolt (1995) as Coach's Assistant
- Full Throttle (1995) as Jimmy / Ka-lok
- Little Hero on the Run (1995)
- Kung Fu Cop (1995)
- Those Were the Days (1996)
- King of Robbery (1996) as Zhong
- 24 Hours Ghost Story (1997) as Ah-Ah
- Full Alert (1997) as Bill
- My Dad Is a Jerk (1997)
- Troublesome Night 2 (1997) as Chuen
- Intimates (1997) as Wang Cheng
- Task Force (1997) as Robber
- 97 Aces Go Places (1997) as Fatty's man in black
- Young and Dangerous 5 (1998) as Big Head
- Troublesome Night 3 (1998) as Rock
- Hong Kong X-File (1998) as Miu
- Hard Trail (1998)
- Life Express (1998)
- Troublesome Night 5 (1999) as Brother B
- Fourteen Days Before Suicide (1999) as Leung Tin
- Horoscope 1: The Voice from Hell (1999) as Chai
- The Truth About Jane and Sam (1999) as Jane's brother
- Oh! My Dad! (1999)
- Hanky Panky (1999)
- Last Ghost Standing (1999) as Jackie Chan
- The Untold Story III (1999) as Police Station Receptionist
- Watch Out (1999)
- Baroness (2000)
- Born to Be King (2000) as Big Head
- Killers from Beijing (2000) as Wong
- The King Boxer (2000)
- Bruce Law Stunts (2000)
- Hit Team (2001) as Chong Chin Ho
- Maniacal Night (2001) as Tinkon Pan
- Killing End (2001)
- Let's Sing Along (2001) as Tim
- The Avenging Fist (2001) as Jazz
- Mo ren kuang dao (2001)
- Chinese Heroes (2001) as Master Shen Way
- Mou man tai 2 (2002) as Police officer
- To Seduce an Enemy (2003) as Pong
- City of SARS (2003)
- Star Runner (2003) as "Senior" Ho
- Men Suddenly in Black (2003) as Himself
- Papa Loves You (2004)
- Osaka Wrestling Restaurant (2004) as TV Director
- One Nite in Mongkok (2004) as Brandon
- Cop Unbowed (2004) as Curry
- Boxer's Story (2004) as Fung
- Unusual Moment (2004)
- Hardrock Affairs (2004) as Liu Liang
- Crazy N' the City (2005) as Carlos
- It Had to Be You! (2005)
- A.V. (2005) as Action Director
- 2 Young (2005)
- Drink-Drank-Drunk (2005) as Big Bear
- The Sentiment Confuses: The Cuttlefish (2005)
- Great Heart (2005)
- My Kung-Fu Sweetheart (2006)
- Bet to Basic (2006) as Flying Dragon
- Half Twin (2006)
- Feel It Say It... (2006)
- Undying Heart (2006) as Chung
- Dancing Lion (2007) as TV producer
- Lust, Caution (2007) as Tsao
- Beauty and the 7 Beasts (2007) as Preacher
- Vampire Super (2007) as Song Ren He
- Shinjuku Incident (2009) as Hongkie
- Murderer (2009) as Andy
- Kungfu Cyborg (2009) as Xu Dachun
- Fortune King Is Coming to Town! (2010)
- 72 Tenants of Prosperity (2010)
- Bruce Lee, My Brother (2010) as Shek Kin
- I Love Hong Kong 2012 (2012) as Citizen
- The Bullet Vanishes (2012) as Wu ZhongGuo
- Cold War (2012) as Vincent Tsui
- Golden Chicken 3 (2014) as Businessman Whoremaster
- Overheard 3 (2014) as Yuen
- Break Up 100 (2014)
- Keeper of Darkness (2015)
- Special Female Force (2016) as Big Head
- Golden Job (2018) as Dan Ding
- The Goldfinger (2023)

=== TVB series ===
Year	Title	Role	TVB Anniversary Awards	Notes
1993	The Legendary Ranger 原振俠	Mo Ming 莫名		
1995	The Romantic Swordsman 小李飛刀	Ah-fei 阿飛		
1996	The Hitman Chronicles 大刺客	了因		
1996	Journey to the West 西遊記	蜈蚣精		
1997	Detective Investigation Files III 刑事偵緝檔案III	Cho Heung Tung 曹向東		
1998	Burning Flame 烈火雄心	Ng Dai Heng 吳大興		
1999	A Matter of Business 千里姻緣兜錯圈	樂文		
1999	Game of Deceit 騙中傳奇	顧井		
1999	Dragon Love 人龍傳說	Yip Chu / Chow Chu 葉處 / 周處		
2001	Gods of Honour 封神榜	Yeung Jin 楊戩		
2002	Let's Face It 無考不成冤家	Au Yeung Sau Yip 歐陽守業		
2002	Good Against Evil 點指賊賊賊捉賊	Chan Giem Fung 練劍鋒		
2003	Hearts of Fencing 當四葉草碰上劍尖時	Yu Chi Wai 余志偉		
2003	Life Begins at Forty 花樣中年	Chan Bing Gei 陳炳基		
2005	The Academy 學警雄心	Kook Ming Cheung 曲明昌		
2007	The Drive of Life 歲月風雲	Chan Ka Lok 陳嘉樂		guest (ep33-35)
2007	On the First Beat 學警出更	Kook Ming Cheung 曲明昌		
2009	A Bride for a Ride 王老虎搶親	Wong Lo Fu 王老虎	Nominated - Best Actor (Top 15); Nominated - My Favourite Male Character (Top 15)	
2011	Only You; Only You 只有您	Lau Siu Long 劉小龍		
2012	Divas in Distress 巴不得媽媽	Chong Ka-long 莊嘉朗		
2015	The Fixer 拆局專家	Szeto Sam-ping 司徒心平		

=== TVB Host ===
Year	Title	TVB Anniversary Awards
1995–1996	Movie Buff Championship 超級無敵獎門人	
1997	Movie Buff Championship Series 2 超級無敵獎門人之再戰江湖	
1998–1999	The Super Trio Show 天下無敵獎門人	Won - My Favourite On-Screen Partners (Non-Dramas)
1999	The Super Trio Mega Show 驚天動地獎門人	Won - My Favourite On-Screen Partners (Non-Dramas)
2000–2001	The Super Trio Show Series 2 宇宙無敵獎門人	Won - My Favourite On-Screen Partners (Non-Dramas)
2002	A Trio Delights 吾係獎門人	
2004–2005	The Super Trio Continues 繼續無敵獎門人	Won - My Favourite On-Screen Partners (Non-Dramas)
2008–2009	Super Trio Supreme 鐵甲無敵獎門人	Won - Best Presenter; Nominated - Best Variety Show (Top 10)
2008–2009	Tips For Home Decoration Series 4 宜室宜居有辦法	
2009	Club Sparkle 星星同學會	Won - Best Variety Show; Nominated - Best Presenter (Top 5)
2010	Super Trio Game Master 超級遊戲獎門人	Nominated - Best Host (Top 5); Nominated - Best Variety Show (Top 5)
2010	Tips For Home Decoration Series 5 宜室宜居有辦法	
2013	Super Trio Maximus 超級無敵獎門人終極篇	
2016	I Heart HK 我愛香港	

Awards and achievements
Preceded by None	Golden Bauhinia Awards for Best Supporting Actor; 1996 for Full Throttle	Succeeded by Eric Tsang for Comrades: Almost a Love Story
