= Mavis Fan =

Taiwanese singer and actress

- 范曉萱
- Born: 27 February 1977 (age 49); Taipei, Taiwan
- Occupations: Singer; actress
- Years active: 1995–present
- Awards: Golden Melody Awards – Best Mandarin Album; 2000 I Want Us To Be Together

Chinese name
- Traditional Chinese: 范曉萱
- Simplified Chinese: 范晓萱
Transcriptions
Standard Mandarin
- Hanyu Pinyin: Fàn Xiǎoxuān
- Musical career
- Genres: Mandopop
- Instruments: Vocals; flute; piano
- Label: Linfair Records (1995–2000)

Mavis Fan (Chinese: 范曉萱; pinyin: Fàn Xiǎoxuān; born 27 February 1977) is a Taiwanese singer and actress.

== Life and career ==
Fan began her singing career in the mid 90s as a pop idol, singing songs catered mostly towards children and young teenagers.

Fan was raised only by her mother, since her parents separated when she was just two years old. Her mom forged her unbreakable bond with music. She was sent to learn the flute and piano at the age of three, since her mom, an aspiring singer, had put all of her own musical dreams in Fan. They led a tight life. Her mom had to sing at bars to afford Mavis' tuition for the best music school in Taiwan.

Fan did not let her mom down. She began to sing on stage at 14. Time has brought about many changes to both her life and her music, but her passion for expression has never changed. At 17 years old, she began to sing children's songs. In the late 1990s, she adopted a more mature image, singing in a variety of pop styles for a more general audience and captured significant amounts of popular attention.

=== Film ===
Her film debut was in The Private Eye Blues in 1995. She played the role of A-Su in the 2005 film About Love.

== Discography ==
"Your Sweetness" (1995)

When Mavis entered the Taiwan music scene in the mid-90s, she was first packaged as a sweet little girl. Her music company came up with the idea of featuring children's songs on her albums.

"Darling" (1998)

Fragile, childish and sentimental, just like the humid air of her island home, that was "Darling", the title track of Mavis' 1998 album of the same name. This song came after a break-up, when Mavis was in New York filming the video for "Bartender Angel."

"I Want Us To Be Together" (1999)

In 1999, the album I Want Us To Be Together, the follow-up to the Darling album, came out as yet another Mavis do-my-own-music manifesto with its titular song "I Want Us to Be Together."

Sometimes (1999–2000)

Mavis' two transition albums never achieved as much commercial success as critical success.

"You Don't Trust Me Anymore" (2001)

Written by Mavis and co-produced by her boyfriend Laurence Chow, the song was published on Mavis' 2001 album Lounge Diva. Rumors said Mavis developed depression during her transition period, because she put herself under too much pressure to produce good music. She confirmed this in her 2001 book Scratch.

== Filmography ==
=== Films ===
- The Private Eye Blues (1994)
- About Love (2005)
- Lover's Discourse (2010)
- The Flying Swords of Dragon Gate (2011)
- The Silent War (2012)
- Refresh 3+7 / 刷新3+7 (nano-movie, 2012)
- Afternoon Delight! (2013)
- Joy Division (2013)
- Will You Still Love Me Tomorrow? (2013)
- Heartfall Arises (2016)

=== Television ===
- Nowhere Man (2019)
