= Jiang Yiyan =

Chinese actress and singer

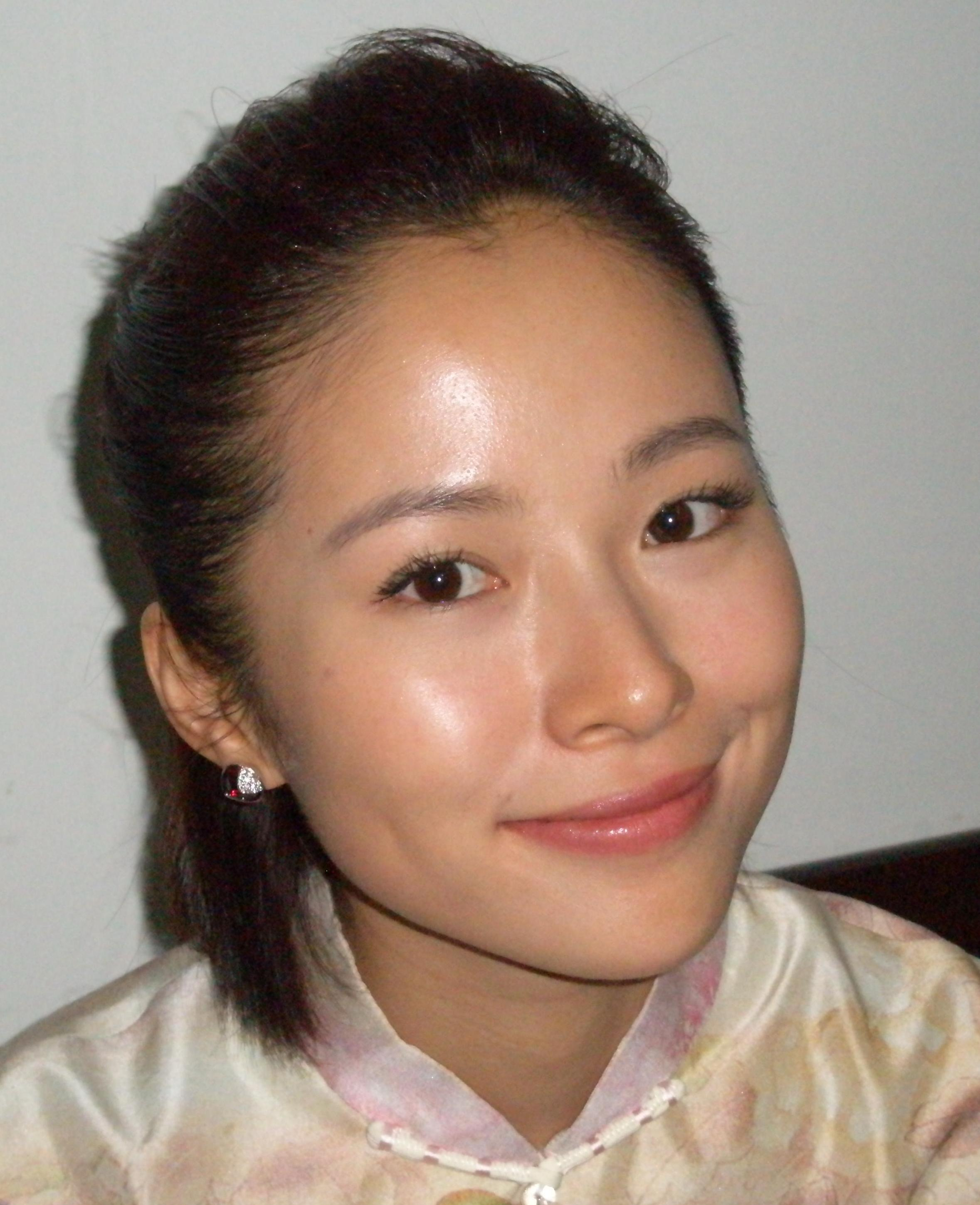
- Jiang in 2009 in Nanjing, China
- Born: Jiang Yan (江燕); September 11, 1983 (age 42); Shaoxing, Zhejiang, China
- Education: Beijing Dance Academy; Beijing Film Academy
- Occupations: Actress; singer
- Years active: 1999–present

Chinese name
Transcriptions
Standard Mandarin
- Hanyu Pinyin: Jiāng Yīyàn
Yue: Cantonese
- Jyutping: Gong1 Jat1-jin1
- Musical career
- Label: Avex Trax

Jiang Yiyan (Chinese: 江一燕; pinyin: Jiāng Yīyàn; born Jiang Yan on September 11, 1983) is a Chinese actress and singer.

== Life and career ==
She was born as Jiang Yan in Shaoxing, Zhejiang province, China. When she was 15, she enrolled in Beijing Dance Academy to study dance and singing. In 2002, she was enrolled in Beijing Film Academy. While she was at college, she started her first role in the film One Summer with You as Li Mingxin.

== Filmography ==
=== Film ===
Year	English title	Chinese title	Role	Notes/Ref.
2005	One Summer with You	与你同在的夏天	Li Mingxin	
2006		我把初吻献给谁	Xu Yaxin	
2008	Deadly Delicious	双食记	Coco	
2009	City of Life and Death	南京!南京!	Jiang Xiangjun	
2009	The Fish in the Water	鱼不在水里	An Xue	
2009	Qiuxi	秋喜	Qiuxi	
2010	The Precious Secret	宝贵的秘密	Wei Meixiu	
2010	Reign of Assassins	剑雨	Tian Qingtong	
2011	Blue Cornflower	蓝色矢车菊	Sang Duo	
2011	I Phone You	爱封了	Ling	
2011	The Pretending Lovers	假装情侣	Shen Lu	
2011	Rest on Your Shoulder	肩上蝶	Baobao	
2012	Shanghai Strangers	非典情人	Xiuxiu	
2012	The Four	四大名捕	Yao Jihua	
2012	The Bullet Vanishes	消失的子彈	Fu Yuan	
2013	Conspirators	同謀	Oxide Pang Shun	
2013	The Four II	四大名捕2	Yao Jihua	
2014	Bunshinsaba 3	笔仙3	Lina	
2014	The Four III	四大名捕3	Yao Jihua	
2015	One Night Stud	有种你爱我	Zuo Xiaoxin	
2015	Cities in Love	恋爱中的城市	Xiao Jiang	
2015	The Vanished Murderer	消失的凶手	Fu Yuan	
2015	Les Aventures d'Anthony	陪安东尼度过漫长岁月		Cameo
2016	Sword Master	三少爷的剑	Murong Qiuti	
2017	Dealer/Healer	毒。诫	Ke Rou	
2017	Seventy-Seven Days	七十七天	Lantian	
2017	The Looming Storm	暴雪将至	Yanzi	

=== Television series ===
Year	English title	Chinese title	Role	Notes/Ref.
2002		葛定红同志的夕阳红	Duan Xiaoling	
2004	Mother	母亲	Wen Xiaoxu	
2006		错爱	Xie Xiaoying	
2007	Sparkling Tinders	星火	Zhou Meichun	
2007	We have Nowhere to Place Youth	我们无处安放的青春	Zhou Meng	
2009		情非情	Xiang Meishuang	
2013	Old Days in Shanghai	像火花像蝴蝶	Zhao Yongfang	
2019		往事云烟	Lv Zi	

== Discography ==
- I'm Still Here (我还在这里)
- Unable to Escape (插翅难逃)
