= Law Chi-leung =

Hong Kong film director

Law Chi-leung (simplified Chinese: 罗志良; traditional Chinese: 羅志良; pinyin: Luó Zhìliáng), also credited as Lo Chi-leung, is a Hong Kong film director and screenplay writer.

== Filmography as director ==
- Viva Erotica (1996)
- Double Tap (2000)
- Inner Senses (2002)
- Koma (2004)
- Bug Me Not! (2005)
- Kidnap (2007)
- Curse of the Deserted (2010)
- The Bullet Vanishes (2012)
- The Vanished Murderer (2015)
- Come Back Home (2022)
- High Forces (2024)
