= Thomas Brasch =

German author, poet and film director (1945–2001)

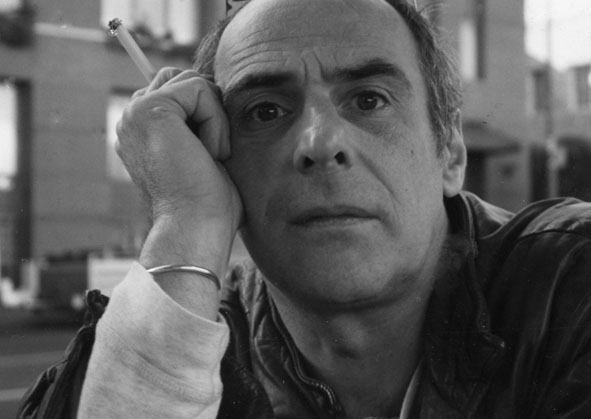
- Thomas Brasch in 1993
- Born: 19 February 1945; Westow, Yorkshire, England
- Died: 3 November 2001 (aged 56)
- Occupations: Author, Poet, Film director
- Notable work: Engel aus Eisen, Domino, Lovely Rita
- Awards: 1981 Bavarian Film Awards – Best Director, 1987 Kleist Prize

Thomas Brasch (19 February 1945 – 3 November 2001) was a British and German author, poet and film director.

== Life ==
Born in Westow, Yorkshire, England, Thomas Brasch was the son of German Jewish Communist émigré parents. In 1947, the family returned to East Germany. Brasch attended school in Cottbus. From 1956 to 1960, he was at the National People's Army Cadet School and made his Abitur. From 1964, he studied journalism in Leipzig and was forced in 1965 to ex-matriculate. Since 1966 he worked at the theater Volksbühne Berlin, and studied dramaturgy at the film school Babelsberg afterwards. In 1968, he was relegated and sentenced to two years and three months in prison for "anti-state agitation", because of the protest against the invasion of Czechoslovakia. In 1971, after being a miller in a Berlin factory, he worked in the Brecht archive and was then freelance writer. In 1976, after protesting against Wolf Biermann's expatriation, he moved to West Germany.

Brasch was in a relationship with the actress Katharina Thalbach.

Brasch died in Berlin on 3 November 2001.

== UK productions ==
In May 2012, Brasch's play Lovely Rita was performed in English for the first time in the Warwick Arts Centre.

== US productions ==
In November 1976, Brasch's theatre piece Paper Tiger was performed in English for the first time at the 4th International Bertolt Brecht Conference in Austin, Texas, with music composed by Raymond Benson. Benson subsequently directed an off-off-Broadway production of the musical in New York, New York, in September 1980.

== Awards ==
- 1981 Bavarian Film Awards, Best Director
- 1987 Kleist Prize

== Publications ==
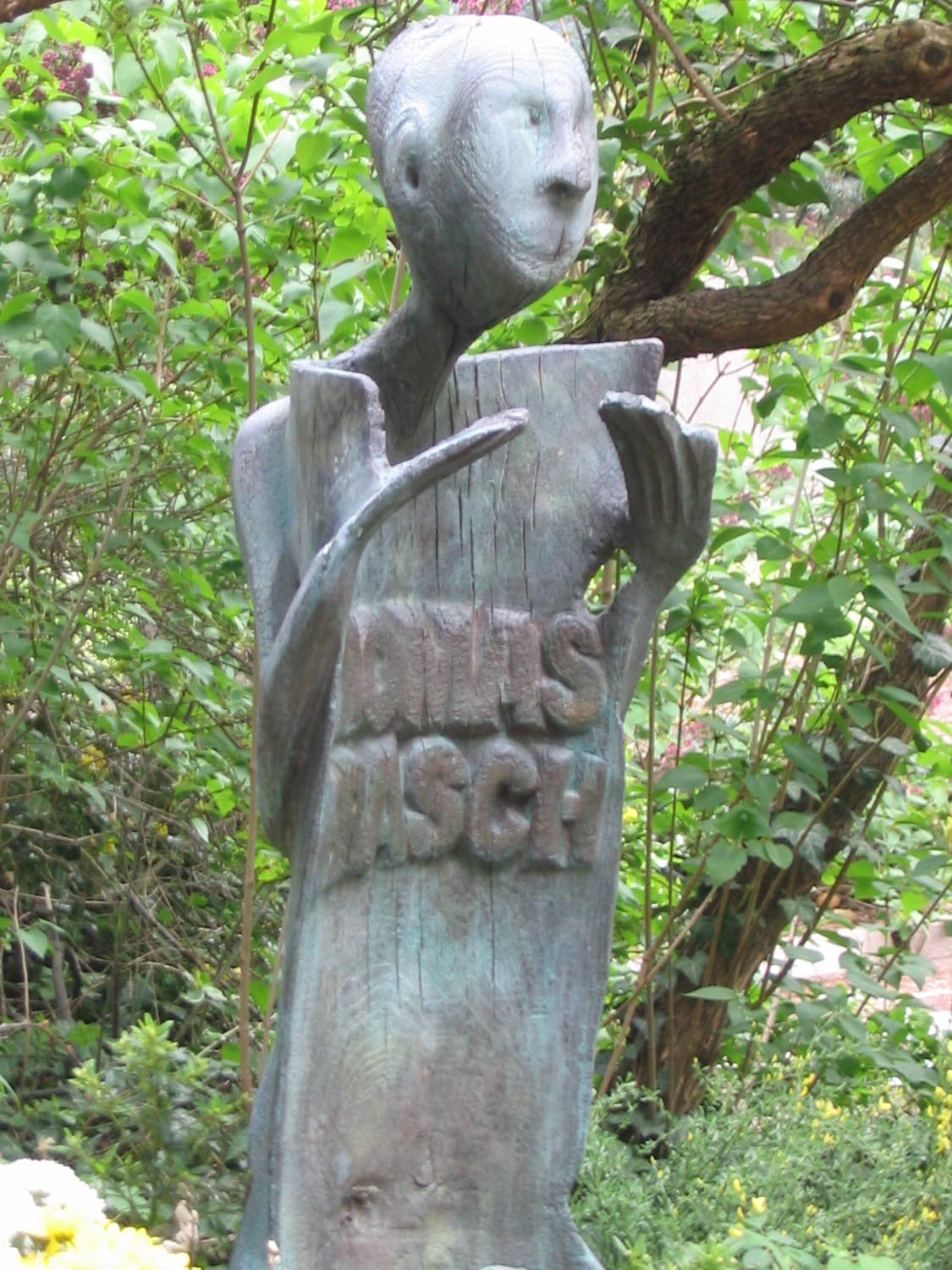
Grave decoration on the Dorotheenstädtischer Friedhof by Alexander Polzin

- "Sie geht, sie geht nicht", play, 1970
- "Das beispielhafte Leben und der Tod des Peter Göring", play, with Lothar Trolle, 1971
- "Galileo Galilei – Papst Urban VIII.", play, with Lothar Trolle, 1972
- "Der Schweinehirt. Die wilden Schwäne", two radio plays by Hans Christian Andersen, Berlin 1975
- "Vom dicken Herrn Bell, der das Telefon erfunden hat", radio play, Berlin 1974
- "Herr Geiler", play, 1974
- "Lovely Rita", play, 1975
- "Poesiealbum 89", Berlin 1975
- "Die argentinische Nacht", comedy based on Oswaldo Dragún, Berlin 1975
- "Vor den Vätern sterben die Söhne", prose, Berlin 1977
- "Kargo. 32. Versuch auf einem untergehenden Schiff aus der eigenen Haut zu fahren", Frankfurt (Main) 1977
- "Rotter. Und weiter. Ein Tagebuch, ein Stück, eine Aufführung.", Frankfurt (Main) 1978
- "Der schöne 27. September", poetry, Frankfurt (Main) 1980
- "Engel aus Eisen", book based on film, Frankfurt (Main) 1981
- "Der König vor dem Fotoapparat", children's book, Olten 1981
- "Domino", book based on film, Frankfurt (Main) 1982
- "Anton Tschechows Stücke", translated by Thomas Brasch, Frankfurt (Main) 1985
- "Lovely Rita, Lieber Georg, Mercedes", play, Berlin 1988
- "Lovely Rita, Rotter, Lieber Georg", play, Frankfurt (Main) 1989
- "Frauen Krieg Lustspiel", play, Frankfurt (Main) 1989
- "Drei Wünsche, sagte der Golem", poetry, prose and play, Leipzig 1990
- "Mädchenmörder Brunke", prose, Frankfurt (Main) 1999
- "Liebe Macht Tod", parts and materials, Frankfurt (Main) 2002
- "Shakespeare-Übersetzungen", Frankfurt (Main) 2002
- "Wer durch mein Leben will, muß durch mein Zimmer", poetry, Frankfurt (Main) 2002
- "Was ich mir wünsche", poetry, Frankfurt (Main) 2007
- "Du einsamer, du schöner Wicht", audio book, read by Katharina Thalbach and Anna Thalbach, Hoffmann&Campe 2007

== Filmography ==
- 1981 – Engel aus Eisen – Director and screenwriter (with Hilmar Thate, Katharina Thalbach, Peter Brombacher, Klaus Pohl, Ulrich Wesselmann, Hermann Killmeyer and Karin Baal). That was the first movie by Brasch. In 1981 he was awarded the Bayerischer Filmpreis. His acceptance speech was controversial, since Brasch explicitly thanked the Filmhochschule der DDR for his education.
- 1982 – Domino – Director and screenwriter (with Katharina Thalbach, Bernhard Wicki, Hanns Zischler, Anne Bennent, Manfred Karge, Ilse Pagé, Klaus Pohl, Peter Brombacher, Julia Lindig)
- 1985 – Mercedes – Director and screenwriter. Filming for Dutch broadcaster VPRO (with Jan Eijkelboom, Annet Kouwenhoven and Titus Muizelaar)
- 1988 – Der Passagier – Welcome to Germany – Director, screenwriter with Jurek Becker (with Tony Curtis, Katharina Thalbach, Birol Ünel, Matthias Habich, Karin Baal, Charles Régnier, Ursula Andermatt and George Tabori)

== Films about Thomas Brasch ==
- 1977 – Annäherung an Thomas Brasch, Director: Georg Stefan Troller
- 2005 – Skizze Thomas Brasch, Director: Christoph Rüter
- 2021 – Dear Thomas, Director: Andreas Kleinert
