= Track Aduowan =

Track Aduowan Hands up 2
- Film poster
- Traditional Chinese: 舉起手來：追擊阿多丸
- Simplified Chinese: 举起手来：追击阿多丸
- Hanyu Pinyin: Jǔqǐ Shǒulaí Zhuījī Āduōwán
- Directed by: Feng Xiaoning
- Written by: Feng Xiaoning
- Produced by: Han Sanping
- Starring: Pan Changjiang; Guo Da; Liu Wei
- Cinematography: Feng Xiaoning; Zheng Jie
- Production company: China Film Group Corporation
- Distributed by: China Film Group Corporation
- Release date: September 9, 2010 (China)
- Running time: 98 minutes
- Country: China
- Language: Mandarin

Track Aduowan is a 2010 Chinese historical comedy film and sequel to Hands Up!. It was directed and written by Feng Xiaoning, and produced by Han Sanping. The film stars Pan Changjiang, Guo Da, and Liu Wei. It based on the Second Sino-Japanese War. It was released in China on September 9, 2010 to commemorate the 65th anniversary of the victory of the Second Sino-Japanese War.

== Cast ==
- Pan Changjiang as the Imperial Japanese Army officer.
- Guo Da as the cook Guo, an underground Communist in Aduowan.
- Liu Wei as "Me"/ Mother/ Grandmother, the narrator of the film.

=== Other ===
- Feng Weiduo as the granddaughter of cook Guo.
- Dai Feifei as Miss Zhao, a Chinese espionage.
- Hu Xiaoguang as the tycoon.
- Yin Guohua as the interpreter of Imperial Japanese Army.
- Bao De as the captain of Eighth Route Army.
- Zhang Xiaoning as an Imperial Japanese Army soldier.
- Stephen as the captain of the United States Navy submarine.

== Release ==
It was shown at the 2010 Beijing Film Festival.
