= Welcome to Germany =

Welcome to Germany may refer to:

- The Passenger – Welcome to Germany, a 1988 German drama film
- Welcome to Germany (2016 film), a German comedy film
