= Fritz Hakl =

Austrian actor (1932–2012)

- Born: 1 January 1932; Oberfeistritz, Steiermark, Austria
- Died: 28 February 2012 (aged 80); Graz, Styria, Austria
- Occupation: Actor

Fritz Hakl (1 January 1932 – 28 February 2012) was an Austrian actor with the honorary title Kammerschauspieler.

== Biography ==
Born in Oberfeistritz, Steiermark to ordinary-size parents, Fritzs Hakl was the small-sized sixth child in a poor family. From 1966 to 1994 he was part of the ensemble of the Vienna Burgtheater. In 1978 he played the clown and vaudeville group director Bebra in Volker Schlöndorff's film adaptation of the novel The Tin Drum by Günter Grass.

Since his retirement from the stage in 1994, Fritz Hakl lived again in his native Oberfeistritz. He died in Graz in 2012.

== Filmography ==
Year	Title	Role	Notes
1972	Der letzte Werkelmann	Liliputaner	
1973	Van der Valk und die Reichen		TV movie
1976	Derrick	Kranz	Episode: "Das Superding"
1977	Lady Dracula	Hotelgast Dr. Kannoft	
1977	Staatsoperette		
1979	The Tin Drum	Bebra	
1979	Fremd bin ich eingezogen	Zwerg Schubert	
1992	Metamorphosen	Narrator	Voice, (final film role)

== Honors ==
- 1986: Goldenes Ehrenzeichen der Republik Österreich
- 1989: Title Kammerschauspieler
