= Juanjo Puigcorbé =

Spanish actor (born 1955)

- Puigcorbé in 2026
- Born: 22 July 1955 (age 71); Barcelona, Spain
- Occupation: Actor
- Years active: 1977–present

Juanjo Puigcorbé (born 22 July 1955) is a Spanish actor. He has appeared in over 100 films and television shows since 1977. He starred in the 1993 film The Window Over the Way, which was entered into the 44th Berlin International Film Festival.

He ran in the Republican Left of Catalonia list to the 2015 Barcelona municipal election (second to Alfred Bosch) and became a city councillor.

== Partial filmography ==
- L'orgia (1978) - Joan
- Salut i força al canut (1979) - Juan
- Barcelona sur (1981) - Encuestador
- Un genio en apuros (1983) - Camarero
- Últimas tardes con Teresa (1984) - Luis
- La noche más hermosa (1984) - Himself
- La vaquilla (1985) - Alférez
- Pasión lejana (1986) - Ángel
- Mi general (1987) - Capitán Eusebio Pujol
- Barrios altos (1987) - Luis
- Material urbà (1987) - Andreu
- La diputada (1988) - Albors
- Amanece como puedas (1988) - Miquel
- El acto (1989) - Andrés
- Cómo ser mujer y no morir en el intento (1991) - Mariano
- Ho sap el ministre? (1991) - Jordi López
- Salsa rosa (1992) - Tomás
- Un paraguas para tres (1992) - Daniel
- La reina anónima (1992) - Marido
- The Diary of Lady M (1993) - Diego / painter
- Rosa Rosae (1993) - Teo-Doro
- Mal de amores (1993) - Mario
- The Window Over the Way (1993, TV Series) - Adil Bey
- Mi hermano del alma (1993) - Toni
- Una chica entre un millón (1994) - Miguel
- Todos los hombres sois iguales (1994) - Joaquín
- Justino, un asesino de la tercera edad (1994) - Empresario
- El somni de Maureen (1995) - Arístides / Albert
- Boca a boca (1995) - Actor en el video del Casting (uncredited)
- Amores que matan (1996) - Marcos
- Gran Slalom (1996) - Manuel
- El dedo en la llaga (1996) - Ángel
- Mirada líquida (1996) - Antonio
- Love Can Seriously Damage Your Health (1997) - Santi Garcia
- Corazón loco (1997) - Félix
- Airbag (1997) - Jugador timba
- No se puede tener todo (1997) - Jordi
- Suerte (1997) - Berasategui
- Al límite (1997) - Javier
- The Naked Eye (1998) - Ramón
- Novios (1999) - Arturo
- Amnèsia (2002) - Xavier
- Besos de gato (2003) - Fran
- Trileros (2003) - Julio
- Inconscientes (2004) - Dr. Mira
- Bala perdida (2007) - Daniel
- Rivales (2008) - Fernando
- La Conjura de El Escorial (2008) - Felipe II
- The Disciple (2010) - Pilate
- La chispa de la vida (2011) - Álvaro Aguirre
- Ni pies ni cabeza (2012) - General Yanes
- La venta del paraíso (2012) - Olivetti
- Sonata per a violoncel (2015) - Rovira
- Juegos de familia (2016) - Andrés
- Barcelona 1714 (2019) - Bastiaan Van Kroeg
- Weiss & Morales (2025)
