= Cai Ming =

Cai Ming may refer to:

- Cai Ming (actress) (born 1961), Chinese comedy actress
- Ming Tsai (born 1964), American celebrity chef
