= Guo Da =

Chinese actor and sketch comedy performer

- 郭达
- Born: 9 June 1954 (age 72); Xi'an, Shaanxi, China
- Education: Shanghai Theatre Academy
- Occupations: Actor, sketch comedy performer
- Years active: 1987 - present
- Organization: CCP Central Military Commission Political Work Department Song and Dance Troupe
- Notable work: Hands Up; Hands Up 2
- Political party: Chinese Communist Party
- Spouse: Wu Fang
- Children: A son

Guo Da (simplified Chinese: 郭达; traditional Chinese: 郭達; pinyin: GuōDá; born 9 June 1954) is a Chinese actor and sketch comedy performer. Guo is a member of Chinese Communist Party and CCP Central Military Commission Political Work Department Song and Dance Troupe.

Guo is notable for performing sketch comedy in CCTV New Year's Gala since 1987.

== Biography ==
Guo was born in Xi'an, Shaanxi on June 9, 1954, with his ancestral home in Xiaoyi, Shanxi, his father died of illness in May 1954 before his birth, he was raised by his mother.

Guo entered Shanghai Theatre Academy in 1974, majoring in acting at the Acting Department, where he graduated in 1977. After graduating he was assigned to Xi'an Theatre to work as an actor for 10 years.

Guo performed sketch comedy in CCTV New Year's Gala since 1987.

== Personal life ==
Guo married Wu Fang (吴芳), who is a costume designer, the couple have a son, he is studying in United Kingdom.

== Works ==
=== Film ===
| Year | English Title | Chinese title | Role | Cast | Ref |
|---|---|---|---|---|---|
| 1987 | The Biography of Norman Bethune | 白求恩：一个英雄的成长 | Translator | | |
| 1988 | General Peng Dehuai | 彭大将军 | guest | | |
| 1989 | The Egg-Trafficking Army | 倒蛋部队 | a young girl | Cai Ming | |
| 1990 | Love | 恋爱角 | a youth girl | Zhang Jinlai, Cai Ming, Fu Yiwei | |
| 1990 | | 现世活宝 | | Zhao Benshan, Gong Hanlin | |
| 2004 | Xintianyou | 信天游 | Yang Yulou | | |
| 2005 | Hands Up! | 举起手来 | Uncle Guo | Pan Changjiang | |
| 2005 | | 心急吃不了热豆腐 | guest | Feng Gong | |
| 2006 | | 公鸡下蛋 | guest | Pan Changjiang, Juhao | |
| 2007 | | 龙过鼠年 | guest | Zhao Benshan, Fan Wei | |
| 2007 | | 欢天喜地 | Jia You | Liang Guanhua, Huang Shengyi | |
| 2010 | Hands Up 2 | 举起手来2之追击阿多丸 | Uncle Guo | Pan Changjiang | |
| 2012 | | 绝对底线 | A writer | Guo Tao | |
| 2014 | Tomb Robber | 密道追踪之阴兵虎符 | | | |

=== Television ===
| Year | English Title | Chinese title | Role | Cast | Ref |
|---|---|---|---|---|---|
| 1987 | Wang Zhaojun | 王昭君 | Emperor Yuan of Han | | |
| 1999 | Idler: Sister Ma | 闲人马大姐 | Sister Ma | Cai Ming | |
| 2003 | Dead Men Do Tell Tales | 大宋提刑官 | Diao Guangdou | He Bing, Luo Haiqiong | |
| 2003 | | 《西安虎家》 | Boss Tiger | | |
| 2003 | Walk Out The Bali Village | 走出巴里堡 | guest | | |
| 2004 | Legend of Song Dynasty | 大宋惊世传奇 | Emperor Zhenzong of Song | | |
| 2004 | The Biography of Brother Ba | 巴哥正传 | | | |
| 2004 | Silver Time | 银色年华 | | | |
| 2005 | Xiaoxiao Tea House | 笑笑茶楼 | | | |
| 2005 | The Dare-To-Die Corps | 非常敢死队 | | | |
| 2005 | The Fashionable Daddy | 时髦老爹 | | | |
| 2005 | Dazzled | 眼花缭乱 | Laohu | | |
| 2006 | | 别拿豆包不当干粮 | | | |
| 2006 | Harmony Brings Wealth 3 | 家和万事兴之抬头见喜 | | | |
| 2006 | | 快乐电信街 | | | |
| 2007 | Jindalai | 金达莱 | | | |
| 2007 | | 低头不见抬头见 | Zhang Fugen | | |
| 2007 | The Stupid Cherub | 糊涂小天使 | | | |
| 2007 | The National Treasure | 国宝迷踪 | | | |
| 2007 | Legend of Shaolin Temple | 少林寺传奇 | | | |
| 2007 | Legend of Shaolin Temple 2 | 少林寺传奇之乱世英雄 | | | |
| 2008 | | 军营芝麻官 | | | |
| 2008 | | 清明上河 | guest | Cai Ming | |
| 2008 | I Love The 2008 Beijing Olympic Games | 奥运我爱你 | | | |
| 2008 | | 清凌凌的水蓝莹莹的天2 | Zheng Laohen | | |
| 2008 | Give You One Crore Yuan | 给你一千万 | Zhao Faliang | | |
| 2009 | Madam White Snake | 白蛇后传 | Qian Wancai | | |
| 2010 | My Mother's Romance | 妈妈的罗曼史 | Director Yan | | |
| 2010 | | 咱村的苹果红了 | | | |
| 2010 | Men of Ronghe Town | 荣河镇的男人们 | Vice-Secretary of a County Party Committee | Cai Ming | |
| 2010 | The Story of Yuanyuan | 圆圆的故事 | Yuanyuan's Uncle | | |
| 2010 | | 风雨桃花镇 | Uncle Lu | | |
| 2010 | The War Before The Dawn | 《黎明前的暗战》 | Bai Chongxi | | |
| 2011 | | 天下归心 | | | |
| 2012 | The Story of The New Editorial Staff | 新编辑部的故事 | | | |
| 2012 | | 《青春不够用》 | | | |

=== CCTV New Year's Gala ===
| Year | Title | Chinese title | Cast | Ref |
|---|---|---|---|---|
| 1987 | The Delivery Room | 产房门前 | Yang Lei | |
| 1988 | Not Even Good Officials Can Settle Family Troubles | 清官难断家务事 | Yang Lei, Shi Fukuan | |
| 1993 | Huangtupo | 黄土坡 | Cai Ming | |
| 1994 | Overseas Call | 越洋电话 | Cai Ming | |
| 1995 | Father | 父亲 | Cai Ming, Zhao Baole, Yu Hailun | |
| 1996 | The Story of the Robot | 机器人趣话 | Cai Ming | |
| 1997 | Spring Festival | 过年 | Cai Ming, Guo Donglin | |
| 1999 | Ball Game Fan | 球迷 | Cai Ming, Guo Donglin | |
| 2000 | The Provision of Youth | 青春之约 | Sun Tao | |
| 2001 | Matchmaker | 红娘 | Cai Ming | |
| 2002 | Between the Neighbors | 邻里之间 | Cai Ming, Niu Qun | |
| 2003 | All My Relatives | 都是亲人 | Cai Ming, Li Wenqi, Liu Xiaomei | |
| 2004 | A Good Man | 好人不打折 | Guo Donglin, Yang Lei | |
| 2005 | The Romantic Thing | 浪漫的事 | Cai Ming, Han Ying | |
| 2006 | The Biography of Sister Ma | 马大姐外传 | Cai Ming | |
| 2007 | Gifts | 送礼 | Cai Ming, Juhao | |
| 2008 | Dream Home | 梦幻家园 | Cai Ming, Wang Ping | |
| 2009 | Welcome to Beijing | 北京欢迎你 | Cai Ming | |
| 2010 | My Family Have A Graduate | 家有毕业生 | Cai Ming | |
