= Back to Square One (film) =

1994 film

- Directed by: Reinhard Münster
- Written by: Pamela Katz; Reinhard Münster
- Produced by: Gebhard Henke
- Starring: Katharina Thalbach
- Cinematography: Axel Block
- Edited by: Tanja Schmidbauer
- Production company: Westdeutscher Rundfunk
- Release date: 26 May 1994
- Running time: 90 minutes
- Country: Germany
- Language: German

Back to Square One (German: Alles auf Anfang) is a 1994 German comedy film directed by Reinhard Münster. It was entered into the 44th Berlin International Film Festival.

== Cast ==
- Katharina Thalbach as Riki Rote
- Udo Samel as Victor Rote
- Harald Juhnke as Georg Kuballa
- Christiane Hörbiger as Lore Kuballa
- Theresa Hübchen as Nina
- Detlev Buck as Chauffeur
- Florian Martens as Richard
- Marie Gruber as Kinoangestellte (Cinema employee)
- Nicole Spiekermann as Sekretärin (Secretary)
- Bernd Stegemann as Banker 1
- Tonio Arango as Banker 2
- Violetta Grafin Tarnowska Bronner as Saengerin (Singer) (as Violetta Tamowska-Bronner)
- Ruth Glöss as Zockerin (Gambler)
