= Evening Bell (film) =

- Film poster
- Traditional Chinese: 晚鐘
- Simplified Chinese: 晚钟
- Hanyu Pinyin: Wǎn zhōng
- Directed by: Wu Ziniu
- Written by: Wu Ziniu; Wang Yifei
- Starring: Chong Peipei; Tao Zeru; Ge Yaming
- Cinematography: Hou Yong
- Edited by: Zong Lijang
- Music by: Ma Jianping
- Production companies: Beijing Film Studio; August First Film Studio
- Release date: March 28, 1989 (China)
- Running time: 90 minutes
- Country: China
- Language: Mandarin

Evening Bell is a 1988 Chinese war film directed by Wu Ziniu. The film stars Tao Zeru, Chong Peipei, and others, and was produced in part by the August First Film Studio, a production company associated with the People's Liberation Army.

It was one of three war films Wu directed in 1988, the other two being Joyous Heroes, and its sequel Between Life and Death.

== Plot ==
Taking place in the immediate aftermath of the Second Sino-Japanese War (the Chinese branch of the Second World War), Evening Bell follows a small platoon of five Chinese soldiers who must negotiate a devastated landscape, burying bodies, disarming mines, and eventually facing off against a starving band of Japanese soldiers who do not yet know that the war has ended.

== Censorship and reception ==
Evening Bell went through a rigorous four-part process with Chinese censors. While the final result was much changed from Wu's original vision, the film nevertheless did well critically both home and abroad. The film won Wu a Golden Rooster award for best direction in 1989 as well as a Silver Bear - Special Jury Prize at the 39th Berlin International Film Festival.
