= Milan Todorović =

Serbian film director and producer (born 1981)

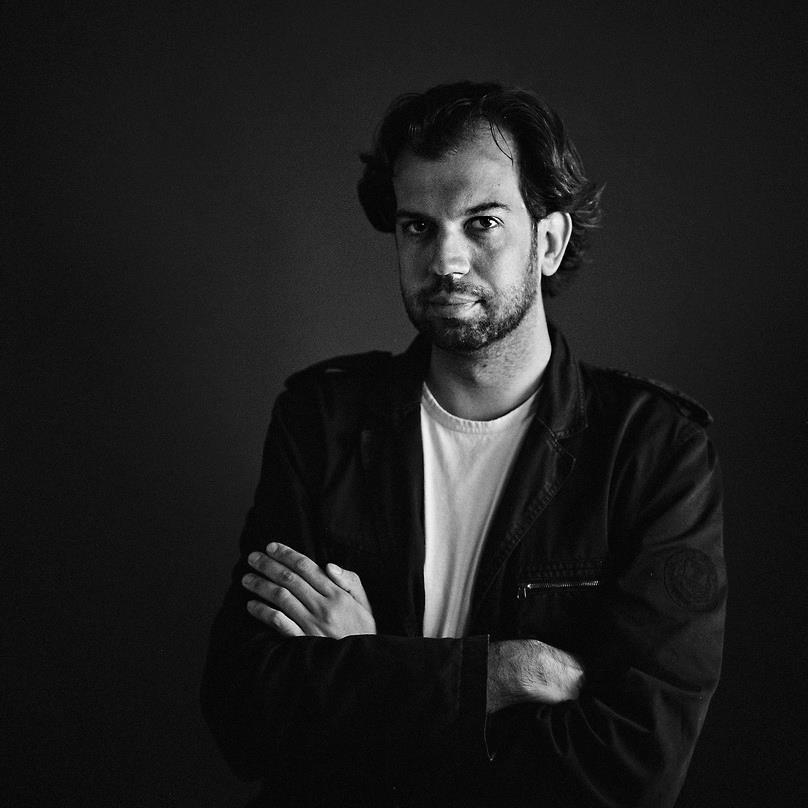
- Born: Milan Todorović; 2 October 1981 (age 43); Pančevo, Serbia
- Occupation(s): Film director, producer, screenwriter
- Years active: 2009–present

Milan Todorović (born 2 October 1981) is a Serbian film director and producer, best known as the creator of the first Serbian zombie movie, Zone of the Dead.

== Biography ==
He finished film school for directing at the Center for Visual Communications Kvadrat in Belgrade and later on graduated with a degree in Film and TV Production from the Faculty of Dramatic Arts in Belgrade in 2006. Todorović worked as the producer and the director on several short films prior to founding his own production company.

Since 2005. he is the head of Talking Wolf Productions, a film production company, which he co-founded with Vukota Brajovic. In 2009. he conceived, produced and co-directed with Milan Konjević feature horror film Zone of the Dead, starring Ken Foree, for which he has been awarded as the best producer of the year at the "Producers' Day" ceremony held by the Faculty of Dramatic Arts, Belgrade.

He was awarded the Lučonoša award, for the best producer of the year (2009)

== Seleceted filmography ==
- Zone of the Dead (2009)
- Mamula (2014)
- Tapavica (2016)
- The Outpost (2019)
- The Ark (2023–present)
