= Couples (1999 film) =

- Theatrical release poster
- Spanish: Novios
- Directed by: Joaquín Oristrell
- Screenplay by: Joaquín Oristrell; Dominic Harari; Teresa de Pelegrí
- Produced by: César Benítez; Joaquín Oristrell; Manuel Gómez Pereira
- Starring: Juanjo Puigcorbé; Candela Peña; Juan Diego Botto; María Barranco; Karra Elejalde
- Cinematography: Hans Bürmann
- Edited by: Miguel Ángel Santamaría
- Music by: Suso Sáiz
- Production companies: Bocatelevisión; Aurum Producciones
- Distributed by: Columbia Tri-Star Films de España
- Release date: 17 September 1999
- Country: Spain
- Language: Spanish

Couples (Spanish: Novios) is a 1999 Spanish comedy film directed by Joaquín Oristrell which stars Juanjo Puigcorbé, Candela Peña and Juan Diego Botto alongside María Barranco and Karra Elejalde.

== Plot ==
The plot tracks sexist wedding catering business owner Arturo, who cheats on his wife Paz with kitchen helper Cristal, who in turns decides to seduce Arturo's son, mentally-challenged Arturito, in retaliation for Arturo's lacks of commitment.

== Cast ==
- Juanjo Puigcorbé as Arturo
- Juan Diego Botto as Arturito
- Candela Peña as Cristal
- María Barranco as Paz
- Karra Elejalde as José
- Francisco Boira as Merlo

== Release ==
The film was released theatrically in Spain on 17 September 1999.

== Reception ==
Jonathan Holland of Variety deemed Couples to be a "disappointing" second feature from Oristrell, veering "uncomfortably between straight farce, social commentary and melodrama", while conceding that the performances are still good.

== See also ==
- List of Spanish films of 1999
