= Angels of Iron =

1981 film

- Directed by: Thomas Brasch
- Written by: Thomas Brasch
- Produced by: Heinz Angermeyer; Joachim von Vietinghoff
- Starring: Hilmar Thate
- Cinematography: Walter Lassally
- Edited by: Stefan Arnsten
- Release date: 23 April 1981
- Running time: 105 minutes (West Germany, USA, Canada)
- Country: West Germany
- Language: German

Angels of Iron (German: Engel aus Eisen) is a 1981 German crime film directed by Thomas Brasch. Theatrically released in West Germany on 23 April 1981. It was entered into the 1981 Cannes Film Festival, but did not win at Cannes. Director Thomas Brasch won the Bavarian Film Award for Best Direction.

== Plot ==
The black-and-white film dramatizes the true story of a Berlin gang of thieves led by juvenile Werner Gladow during the time of the Berlin Blockade and Airlift. Likening Occupied Germany to the Prohibition era United States, writer-director Brasch paints a sympathetic portrait of organized crime in Germany facilitated by demoralization, lawlessness, and anarchy until the 1949 foundation of East and West Germany brings the old "forces of order" (as they are called by Gladow's partner in crime, Gustav Völpel, who used to hang Nazi war criminals for the Allied occupation forces) back to the forefront as former Nazis regain their pre-1945 positions in both German states.

When eventually these "forces of order" come back to power at the end of the Berlin Blockade, they crack down on the anarchic Gladow Gang. Gladow himself is sentenced to death for murder and executed by East Germany at the age of 18 in 1950. Although ex-Nazis offer Völpel a job in the new West-German police if he'll flee to West Berlin, he prefers to stay in an East-German prison until he dies in 1959. This is because Völpel feels freer in prison than inside any ordered society, just as he did before when the Nazis incarcerated him for refusing to fight for them during the Second World War.

== Cast ==
- Hilmar Thate as Gustav Völpel
- Katharina Thalbach as Lisa Gabler
- Ulrich Wesselmann as Gladow
- Karin Baal as Frau Luzie Gladow
- Ilse Pagé as Frau Gerti Völpel
- Peter Brombacher as Schäfer
- Klaus Pohl as Gabler
- Hanns Zischler as Ridzinski (credited as Hans Zischler)
- Horst Laube as Gladow's father
- Jürgen Flimm as West-German police commissioner
- Kurt Raab as driver
- Michael Danisch
- Karl-Heinz Grewe (credited as Karl Heinz Grewe)
- Urs Hefti
- Hermann Killmeyer (Wellmitz)

== Awards ==
The film ran in the First Feature Competition at the 1981 Cannes Film Festival, but was unsuccessful. The film was also a contribution to the Max Ophüls Prize in 1982.

Ilse Pagé received the Gold German Film Award in 1981 for her portrayal of his wife Völpel.

Director Thomas Brasch was awarded the 1981 Bavarian Film Awards, which is worth more than DM 50,000 for his debut directorship.
