= Eloïse's Lover =

2009 film by Jesús Garay

- Spanish poster
- Catalan: Eloïse
- Directed by: Jesús Garay
- Written by: Cristina Moncunill
- Produced by: José Antonio Pérez Giner
- Starring: Diana Gómez; Ariadna Cabrol; Laura Conejero; Bernat Saumell
- Cinematography: Carles Gusi
- Edited by: Anastasi Rinos
- Music by: Carles Cases
- Production company: Els Quatre Gats Audiovisuals S.L.
- Release dates: October 29, 2009 (Seminci); November 6, 2009 (Spain)
- Running time: 91 minutes
- Country: Spain
- Language: Catalan

Eloïse's Lover (Catalan: Eloïse) is a 2009 Catalan-language Spanish film directed by Jesús Garay, produced by José Antonio Pérez Giner and written by Cristina Moncunill.

== Plot ==
The drama depicts a young woman, Asia, falling in love with a young artist and lesbian, Eloise, and discovering her sexuality. Scenes of Asia hospitalized and in a coma are interspersed through the film. Later on, their love story and the tragic accident leading up to her hospitalization unfold.

== Cast ==
- Diana Gómez as Àsia
- Ariadna Cabrol as Eloïse
- Laura Conejero as La Mare
- Bernat Saumell as Nathaniel
- Carolina Montoya as Erika
- Miranda Makaroff as Norah

== See also ==
- List of Spanish films of 2009
