= Jesús Garay (director) =

Spanish film director

- Born: 1949 (age 76–77); Santander, Cantabria, Spain
- Occupations: Film director Screenwriter
- Years active: 1981–present

Jesús Garay (born 1949) is a Spanish film director and screenwriter. His 1993 film The Window Over the Way was entered into the 44th Berlin International Film Festival.

== Selected filmography ==
- Manderley (1981)
- The Window Over the Way (1993)
- Eloïse's Lover (2009)
