= Brenda Wang =

Taiwanese actress and model

Brenda Wang Szu-yi
- Born: 王心靜 (Wang Hsin-ching); December 11, 1972 (age 53); Kaohsiung, Taiwan
- Education: National Taiwan University of Arts
- Years active: 1993–present

Wang Szu-yi (born Wang Hsin-ching on 11 December 1972), also known as Brenda Wang, is a Taiwanese actress and former model.

== Career ==
Wang became a model in 1985. In 1989 she was named a "Top 10 model in Taipei". She started her acting career in the 1993 mega-hit Taiwanese TV series Justice Pao, but her breakout did not come until 1998, when she portrayed Pan Jinlian in the 1998 Chinese TV series The Water Margin. This role made her well known in mainland China, where she has based her career since.

In 2000, she appeared in a skit on CCTV New Year's Gala along with Pan Changjiang and Gong Hanlin, becoming the first Taiwanese actor to appear on China's most-watched annual television event.

== Filmography ==
=== Films ===
Year	Title	Role	Notes
2002	Final Dash (背水一战)	Chen Tianhong	
2005	Sudden Lover (青春爱人事件)	Sister Fen	
2005	Survive the Laughter (笑里逃生)	Chen Mei	
2006	Flying Sword (飛刀)		
2006	The Kitchen (后厨)	Xu Bing	
2007	Call for Love (爱情呼叫转移)	Manager Chen	
2009	Lanzhou 1949 (蘭州 1949)	Xiao Yun	
2009	An Honest and Upright Official (五品縣令)		
2009	Memories of the Clay Plateau (红土地画)		
2010	The Love of Kanas (喀纳斯之恋)	Chen Ruozhi	
2011	Bloody Yanmen Pass (浴血雁門關)		
2011	Under the Influence (戒烟不戒酒)		
2012	One Night to Be Star (一夜成名)		
2013	Happy Life of Yang Guang (杨光的快乐生活)	hotel manager	
2014	Aurora's Love (爱的北极光)		
2017	Hu Yang's Summer		
2019	Once Upon a Time in China		

=== Television ===
Year	Title	Role	Notes
1992	Legends of Liu Po-wen (劉伯溫傳奇)	Mei Ying	
1993	Justice Pao (包青天)	Sun Cuiping	Segment 35: "Judgment of Life and Death" (陰陽判)
1993	Justice Pao (包青天)	Ouyang Linglong	Segment 40: "The Beggar Prince" (乞丐王孫)
1994	The Seven Heroes and Five Gallants (七俠五義)	Ouyang Yunyi	
1994	Heavenly Ghost Catcher (天師鍾馗)	Du Shiniang	
1994	No Tears in Red Dust (紅塵無淚)		
1995	Legends of Koxinga (國姓爺傳奇)		
1995	The Lover of the First Emperor (秦始皇與阿房女)	Yiyun	
1995	Hua Mulan (排山倒海花木蘭)	Hu Li	
1998	The Water Margin (水滸傳)	Pan Jinlian	
1999	Princess Zhuangji (莊姬公主)	Zhuangji	
2005	The Heroine Mu Guiying (巾幗英雄穆桂英)	Mu Guiying	
2006	The Confucian General of Tang Dynasty (大唐儒將開漳聖王)	Wu Zetian	
2006	Survivor (幸存者)		
2006	Let's Remarry (我们复婚吧)		
2007	Fairy Couple (天仙配)		
2008	Ming Dynasty's Legendary Doctor Li Shizhen (大明醫聖李時珍)		
2009	The Rebellious Woman (叛女)		
2009	Huang Tingjian, the Talented Son of Great Song (大宋才子黃庭堅)	Grand Empress Dowager Cao	
2010	Golden Wedding (金婚风雨情)		
2010	My Ugly Father (我的丑爹)		
2010	The Raid of Ningxiang (凝香劫)		
2011	1911 Revolution (辛亥革命)	Chen Cuifen	
2011	Tears of Pear Flower (梨花淚)		
2011	Excessive Sweet Lady (奢香夫人)		
2011	The Story of Xiayin (俠隱記)		
2012	Ocean Couple (望海)		
2012	Winter Snow (冬雪)		
2012	The Phantom (幻影)		
2012	Secret Battles on Mount Taiyang (密戰太陽山)		
2013	Happy Noodle (幸福的面条)		
2013	Nine Deaths, One Life (九死一生)		
2014	A Century of Huanxiang (百年莞香)		
2014	The King of Games (游戏之王)		
2014	The Strait (海峡)		
2014	The Love Song of Xikou (西口情歌)		
2014	Cuilan's Love (翠兰的爱情)		
TBA	Wind and Rain (風雨)		
