= Reinhard Münster (director) =

German film director

- Born: 1955 (age 70–71); Rhineland, Germany
- Occupations: Film director, screenwriter
- Years active: 1984-present

Reinhard Münster (born 1955) is a German film director and screenwriter. His 1994 film Back to Square One was entered into the 44th Berlin International Film Festival.

== Selected filmography ==
- Dorado – One Way (1984)
- The Eighth Day (1990)
- Back to Square One (1994)
