= Ariadna Cabrol =

Spanish actress and model

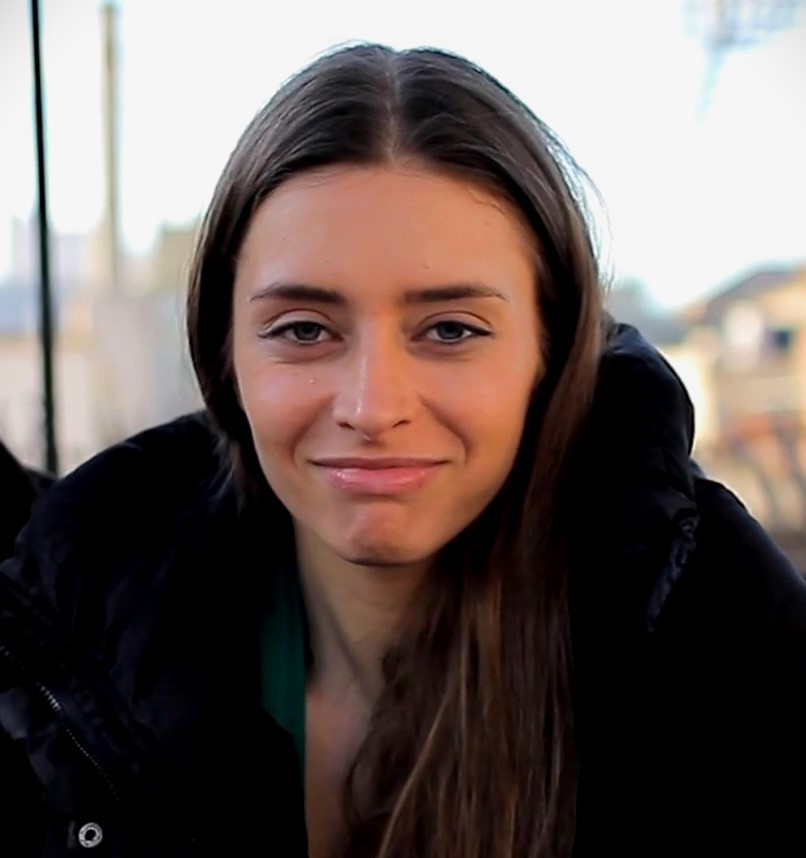
- Cabrol in 2016
- Born: Matadepera, Barcelona, Spain
- Occupation: Actress
- Years active: 2000–present

Ariadna Cabrol is a Spanish actress and model.

== Personal life ==
Ariadna Cabrol was born in Matadepera in Barcelona. She has attended the Nancy Tuñón drama school, completed a course at the Belarusian State University of Culture and Arts and worked with prominent personalities such as Estel Rovira and Raquel Carballo, in the field of acting.

== Career ==
Cabrol made her debut in 2000 with the short film Foc al càntir. She then went on to star in a few Spanish TV shows like Los Serrano, Un Paso Adelante and TV movies like La stella dei re, Estocolm.

Her first break came with Perfume: The Story of a Murderer where she played a beggar woman, the perfumers first victim. She has done a few other films like the Serbian horror film Zone of the Dead.

Aside from films, she has also done some Spanish language theatre productions. She is also a producer and dancer, trained in Flamenco.

== Filmography ==
- 2000 Foc al càntir
- 2004 Youth as Roser
- 2006 Perfume: The Story of a Murderer as Beggar Woman 1
- 2007 Les pel·lícules del meu pare as Amiga Filmoteca
- 2007 Fermat's Room as Girl
- 2008 Shiver as Raquel
- 2009 Zone of the Dead as Angela
- 2009 Dos billetes as Mónica
- 2009 Eloïse's Lover as Eloïse
- 2011 Un golpe de suerte as Tamara
- 2011 Zindagi Na Milegi Dobara (Bollywood Film) as Nuria
- 2011 Mil cretins as La Noia Preciosa
- 2012 Insensibles as María
- 2021 The Innocent as Eva
- 2022 House Red as Eve
- 2022 A Storm for Christmas (TV miniseries) as Maria
- 2026 Benidorm Is Murder (TV series) as DS Maria Hernandez
