= Gong Hanlin =

- 巩汉林
- Born: October 20, 1957 (age 68); Shenyang, Liaoning
- Education: Shenyang Normal University
- Occupations: Actor, sketch comedy performer
- Years active: 1986 - present
- Agent: Mengying Star International Group (梦影明星国际传媒集团)
- Notable work: Love On That Day
- Spouse: Jin Zhu
- Awards: 44th Berlin International Film Festival - Gold Panda Award

Gong HanLin (simplified Chinese: 巩汉林; traditional Chinese: 鞏漢林; pinyin: Gǒng Hànlín; born 20 October 1957) is a Chinese actor and xiangsheng performer and sketch comedy performer.

Gong is notable for performing sketch comedy in CCTV New Year's Gala since 1990.

== Biography ==
Gong was born in Shenyang, Liaoning on October 20, 1957, to actor parents.

After graduating from Shenyang Normal University he was assigned to Shenyang Troupe, he studied xiangsheng under Tang Jiezhong (唐杰忠).

Gong started to perform xiangsheng and sketch comedy in 1986.

He frequently performed on stage with the famous Zhao Lirong prior to her death.

== Personal life ==
Gong married Jin Zhu (金珠), who is also a Chinese actress.

== Works ==
=== CCTV New Year's Gala ===
Year	Title	Chinese Title	Cast
1990	Playing Mahjong	《打麻将》	Yue Hong
1991	Stranger	《陌生人》	Cai Ming
1992	Mother's Today	《妈妈的今天》	Zhao Lirong, Li Wenqi
1995		《如此包装》	Zhao Lirong, Meng Wei
1996		《打工奇遇》	Zhao Lirong, Jin Zhu
1997	Spike	《鞋钉》	Huang Hong
1998		《功夫令》	Zhao Lirong
1999	Back To You	《老将出马》	Zhao Lirong
2000	My Deskmate	《同桌的她》	Pan Changjiang, Brenda Wang
2001	Animal Games	《动物运动会》	Liu Liu
2002	Flowerpot	《花盆儿》	Huang Hong, Kai Li
2004	We Are All Outlanders	《我们都是外乡人》	Bai Qing, Han Zaifen
2006	Neighbour	《邻居》	Huang Hong, Liu Yajin, Lin Yongjian
2008	Unlocking	《开锁》	Huang Hong, Lin Yongjian, Dong Qing
2009		《黄豆黄》	Huang Hong, Wei Ji'an, Huang Xiaojuan
2010	A Serious Misunderstanding	《美丽的尴尬》	Jin Yuting, Lin Yongjian

=== Film ===
Year	Chinese Title	Title	Role	Cast	Director	Ref
2010	《替身传奇乐翻天》		Li Guangming	Huang Yang, Wan Yu, Lou Jing, Li Xinman	Cai Jun	
2012	《冰雪11天》	The Next 11 Days	guest	Feng Yuanzheng, Liu Hua	Chen Guoxing	
2012	《爱在那一天》	Love On That Day	Xiaoya's Father	Ye Qing, Han Qingzi, Wu Yi	Zhu Shaoyu	
2013	《盲班的神灯》		Director	Yi Chunde, Li Mengqi, Liu Yajin	Zheng Yi	
2013	《毛驴县令》			Pan Changjiang, Tian Niu	Pan Changjiang	
2016	《断片儿》	Be Not Trivial Matter				

=== Television ===
Year	Title	Chinese Title	Role	Cast	Ref
1998		《七品芝麻官》	Tang Cheng	Li Ding	
2001	All in the Family	《东北一家人》	Sun Ming	Peng Yu, Li Qi	
2002	Chinese Communist Party Member: Sister Ma	《党员马大姐》	Director Ge	Cai Ming	
2003	The Romance	《浪漫的事》	guest	Ni Ping	
2004		《百姓秀才官》	a student	Lydia Shum	
2004	The Biography of Brother Ba	《巴哥正传》	Bage	Jin Zhu	
2008	The Story of The Crew	《剧组的故事》	Gong Xincheng		
2011	The Grand Mansion Gate 1912	《大宅门1912》	Feiwu	Chen Baoguo	
2011	Old Patient	《老病号》	Ma Zhongquan		
2011	Promise of Love	《爱的契约》	guest		
2011	The Story of 6 Yuan and 6 Jiao	《六块六毛那点事》	Chen Wanliang	Zhang Shaohua	
2011	No.2 Traffic Station	《二号交通站》	Gao Mantang		
2012	Blood Brother	《铁血兄弟》	The Mayor		
2012	Mother-in-low's Happy Life	《岳母的幸福生活》	Laoqiu		
2012	I Want To Be A Soldier	《我要当八路》	Qian Yukun		
2012	Clever Boy: Kongkong	《聪明小空空》	Qian Wanguan		
2013		《黎明前的抉择》	Ye Gongjin	Lan Xi	

== Awards ==
- Sparkling Fox (《火狐》) - 44th Berlin International Film Festival - Honourable Mention
