= Benidorm Is Murder =

British television series

- Genre: Crime drama
- Created by: Ian Jarvis
- Screenplay by: Tom Parry; Claire Downes; Yasmine Akram
- Directed by: Simon Delaney
- Starring: John Hannah
- Composer: Andrea Boccadoro
- Country of origin: United Kingdom
- Original language: English
- No. of series: 1
- No. of episodes: 6

Production
- Executive producers: Chiara Cardoso; Camilla Hammer; Robert Franke; Mike Benson; Andy Morgan
- Running time: 47 minutes
- Production companies: Clapperboard; Blackbox Multimedia

Original release
- Network: 5
- Release: 30 July 2026 – present

Benidorm Is Murder is a British crime drama television series starring John Hannah. It was first broadcast on 5 on 30 July 2026.

== Premise ==
A British former detective who retired from the job to run a bar in Benidorm is drawn to investigating the deaths of tourists in the region alongside his crime drama obsessed barmaid.

== Cast ==
=== Main ===
- John Hannah as Dennis Crown
- Carolina Bécquer as Rosa
- Ariadna Cabrol as DS Maria Hernandez
- Damian Schedler Cruz as PC Jesús Ballesteros
- Brian Bovell as Archie
- Eva Van Der Gucht as Jackie

=== Guest ===
- Alistair McGowan as Vince Starky
- Tamzin Outhwaite as Tiff
- Denise Welch as Ziggy
- Sunil Patel as 'Big Tone'
- Fiona O'Carroll as Cora

== Episodes ==
=== Series 1 (2026) ===
No.	Title	Directed by	Written by	Original release date
1	"Mis-Take That"	Simon Delaney	Ian Jarvis	30 July 2026
Darren, a member of a Benidorm-based Take That tribute act, leaves to pursue a solo career and takes the band's award with him. Bandmate Steven later visits Darren's room to retrieve it and is seen on CCTV leaving shortly afterwards. The next morning, Darren's body is found floating in the hotel pool. Dennis is a cynical British expatriate and former detective who runs a bar in Benidorm. He hires Rosa Ortega, an aspiring actress and enthusiast of detective mystery shows. Steven visits the bar after learning of Darren's death but is soon arrested for murder by DS Maria Hernandez and PC Jesús Ballesteros. Rosa, who previously worked with Steven, insists he is incapable of murder and pressures Dennis to investigate. Dennis and Rosa visit the hotel and question guests, the remaining band members, hotel manager Carlos, and his daughter Isabella. While searching Darren's room, they are confronted by Maria and Jesús for interfering. Reviewing the hotel CCTV, Rosa notices someone wearing a sombrero leaving the room next to Darren's shortly after Steven, although they rule out the possibility of crossing between the balconies. She later discovers that Isabella and Darren were in a relationship and planned to leave for Greece together. At a singles party, Dennis encounters Maria. The pair bond over their failed relationships, with Dennis revealing that his wife Tiffany left him after an affair, and they later have sex. The following morning, Maria reveals that Dennis did not retire but was fired for planting evidence, although he claims his superior, who was also Tiffany's lover, framed him. Reviewing the footage again, Dennis notices the sombrero-wearing figure straighten a picture and realizes it must be someone who cares about the hotel. He deduces that Carlos, after learning Isabella planned to leave with Darren, disguised himself, accessed Darren's room through a concealed passage between the formerly adjoining rooms, struck him with the award, and threw him from the balcony, leaving Steven to discover an empty room. Carlos is arrested, while Rosa celebrates solving the case with Dennis.
2	"Die Laughing"	Simon Delaney	Claire Downes	6 August 2026
Comedy legend Vince Starky arrives in Benidorm with his new wife, Vienna, to perform a series of sold-out shows at the Benidorm Palace. He visits promoter Ziggy's club to see his old friend and former partner, Frank Mann, and asks to speak with him privately. The following morning, Vince is found dead on the club's roof, behind a self-closing, locked door, with the fire extinguisher used to hold the door open having been thrown to the ground below. Short on detectives, Maria asks Dennis to lead the investigation. He questions those involved: Vienna lies about having gone to bed, Frank's son Chris appears nervous, and Dennis dismisses Ziggy as a suspect because she stands to profit from Vince's shows. Frank reveals that Vince had terminal cancer and had come to Benidorm mainly to see Chris, who was unaware that Vince was his biological father and had been raised by Frank and his mother. Chris later confesses, claiming Vince revealed the truth on the roof and tried to comfort him, but Chris, in shock, pushed him away, causing Vince to stumble and strike his head before Chris fled. Dennis remains convinced the fire extinguisher was involved. He and Rosa discover that Vince's shows were actually selling poorly and that Ziggy, already in debt, stood to lose everything. Dennis then notices that Vince had sunburn despite supposedly dying at night. Gathering the suspects, Dennis reveals that Vince could not have died when Chris pushed him, as a corpse could not later develop sunburn. Instead, Ziggy went to the roof to smoke, found Vince still alive, and initially tried to help him before realizing she could claim on the insurance she had taken out against the failed shows. She killed him with the extinguisher, then, trapped on the roof, called an air-conditioning repairman who propped open the door, allowing her to escape unseen. Dennis later leaves his estranged daughter Clara a voicemail wishing her a happy birthday. Clara's boyfriend then calls to tell him that she does not want to hear from him again.
3	"Henidorm"	Simon Delaney	Yasmine Akram	13 August 2026
At Leona's hen party, her obnoxious friend Megan announces that she has booked a luxury villa for Leona, Leona's mother Tania and aunt Cora, and friend Chloe, mocking the group's lower-budget arrangements. They refuse to go with her. The following morning, Megan is found strangled with her maid-of-honour sash at the villa. Maria asks Dennis to investigate, and he quickly concludes that Megan was killed by someone she knew, based on the improvised weapon and two glasses of champagne, before the killer escaped through the patio door. Megan's boyfriend, Paul, arrives in Benidorm to assist with the investigation. The other four members of the hen party all have motives due to their dislike of Megan: Megan had stolen Chloe's boyfriend, Paul, although Chloe was drunkenly getting a tattoo at the time of the murder. Cora, a married and devout Catholic, had been persuaded by Tania to visit a male strip club and ended up having sex with a dancer; Megan witnessed this and threatened to tell Cora's husband. Leona eventually admits that she went to the villa to confront Megan but found her already dead and fled. As the only viable suspect, Leona is arrested by Maria. Returning to the villa, Dennis realizes it had been prepared for a romantic proposal intended to upstage Leona's party and finds an engagement ring hidden inside a balloon. He accuses Paul of having been in Benidorm before Megan's death. When the others refused to join Megan at the villa, she cancelled Paul's proposal, seeing no point without an audience. Enraged by her behaviour, Paul strangled Megan, packed his bags, and waited at the airport for the police to contact him, making it appear that he had only just arrived. Paul is arrested, and Dennis makes Rosa manager of the pub to keep her around.
4	"Eyes Down"	Simon Delaney	Tom Parry	20 August 2026
Barbara is the Bingo Queen of the Benidorm Bingo Dome, having won its largest prize, €1 million, five years earlier and since becoming the face of its marketing. She has never spent the money, intending to leave it to her adult daughters, Ronnie and Connie. One night, Barbara is found dead beside a marked bingo card, with a €2 coin lodged in her throat. Dennis and Rosa question bingo host Javier, who points them toward Barbara's Italian rival, Valentina Di Rossi. Barbara's longtime friend Sandra then seeks their help after receiving an Italian-language note reading "you're next." Dennis shows her Barbara's marked numbers, but she claims not to recognize them. Dennis later questions Valentina, who explains that Barbara effectively took the €1 million ticket from her by joining Sandra at the front of the queue, taking one of the next two tickets that might otherwise have gone to Valentina. Back at the pub, Rosa refers to bingo call 71 as "Bang on the Drum", but patron Archie corrects that it was once "Jamaican Rum". Dennis realizes that seemingly random objects displayed in Barbara's caravan represent the numbers 4, 22, 71, 74, 83, and 90. He also notices medicines associated with delaying dementia. Anticipating her impending death, and to avoid inheritance tax and ensure her daughters received everything, Barbara had withdrawn the €1 million in cash and created the code to remember its location. The numbers total 344, leading Dennis and Rosa to caravan 344, where they find Sandra badly injured. After Sandra recovers, Dennis and Rosa confront her in front of Connie and Ronnie. Dennis deduces that Sandra and Javier were romantically involved. On the night Barbara won, Sandra had bought Barbara's ticket because Barbara had lost her purse, but Barbara never shared the winnings or acknowledged Sandra's role. Javier encouraged Sandra to confront her so they could start a life together. Barbara's death was accidental: after she refused to share the money and gave Sandra only the €2 ticket cost, Sandra snapped and shoved it into Barbara's mouth. When Barbara began choking, Sandra panicked and fled. Javier later persuaded Sandra to frame Valentina. After Dennis showed Sandra the numbers, she realized their meaning and went with Javier to caravan 344, where they found the money. Javier then attacked Sandra and left her for dead before attempting to flee, but police arrest him at the airport, and the money is returned to Connie and Ronnie.
5	"Summery Justice"	Dermot Boyd	Ian Jarvis	27 August 2026
While relaxing on the beach with his wife Caz, stepdaughter Lauren, her boyfriend Travis, and Travis's father Colin, wealthy Mick suddenly dies. The family brings him to Dennis's bar, where they are regulars. He and Rosa become suspicious because the family appears unusually unaffected. A post-mortem later reveals that Mick was poisoned. While walking with Rosa, Dennis explains that Eddie wanted him out of the police and framed him, though he could never prove it. When Rosa asks whether he would ever plant evidence against someone he knew was guilty, Dennis refuses to violate the law. Dennis and Rosa's questioning reveals that Mick was financially and physically abusive and controlling toward Caz and Lauren, while Colin has an extensive criminal history. Rosa also discovers that Lauren is secretly pregnant. Later, Rosa's comment about a dead mouse near the bins helps Dennis solve the case. He searches the rubbish and finds a second version of Mick's hat. Comparing photographs, he notices that the UK flag is reversed on one of them. Dennis gathers the family at the bar and reveals that Lauren and Travis conspired to kill Mick by putting rat poison inside his hat, which released toxic gas when it became damp. When Mick covered his face with it, he inhaled the fumes, which, combined with his serious heart condition, killed him. Lauren then distracted the others by claiming to have been stung by a jellyfish when none were by the beach that day, while Travis swapped the poisoned hat for the duplicate so testing would show no contamination. When they brought Mick's body to the bar, Lauren discarded the poisoned hat in the bin, where it began killing mice. Lauren tries to take the blame herself and reveals her pregnancy. She and Travis explain that they killed Mick out of desperation for his money, believing him to be a bad person who refused to help them start a life together. Colin volunteers to take responsibility, reasoning that he has escaped punishment for many crimes and deserves to pay for one, while Lauren and Travis can live in his house during his imprisonment. The others agree to the deception, including a reluctant Dennis, and Colin is arrested. Dennis's estranged wife Tiffany arrives at the pub to have him sign their divorce papers because she and Eddie are getting married, although Dennis asks her to stay with him. Later, Tiffany arrives with Eddie and reveals that Dennis's signature finalised the divorce and split their assets equally, including the pub, making her and Eddie co-owners.
6	"The Lock-In"	Simon Delaney	Ian Jarvis	3 September 2026
Eddie closes the bar to host a private "going away" party at the Tavern, leaving only him, Dennis, and Rosa present. The suspicious guests include Gav, Ray, and Ricky, but Dennis recognizes the final guest as Stan Grainger, a man he testified against thirty years earlier, sending him to prison for armed robbery. Dennis fears for his life if Stan recognizes him, and forces Rosa to leave the bar. Eddie is eager to ingratiate himself with the group, although they treat him poorly. Jesus is left upset after a girl he likes rejects him because she has a boyfriend. Rosa comforts Jesus in a bar, where they encounter Tiffany. Tiffany tells the pair that she still loves Dennis, but his police job made their relationship impossible to sustain. When Rosa tries to return to the bar, Tiffany warns against it, suggesting Eddie's friends are dangerous. Concerned that Dennis is in danger, Rosa tells Jesus to call Maria. At the Tavern, Rosa, Jesus, and Maria find Eddie stabbed to death. Dennis explains what happened: while he was forced to sing karaoke, the lights went out, and Eddie was stabbed in the dark with a knife. Three of the guests remained seated at their tables while one had gone to the bathroom. Dennis offers to let the guests dispose of the body and pretend they were never there, but Stan refuses, insisting that Dennis solve the crime. Recalling the sounds he heard, Dennis deduces that they all took part: Ray turned off the power, Gav shone a laser pointer at Eddie to highlight his location, and Ricky retrieved the knife and passed it to Stan, who delivered the fatal blow. Stan congratulates Dennis for working it out and reveals he knew who Dennis was all along because Eddie told him. He explains that the party was a setup for him to take his revenge by framing Dennis for Eddie's murder: they used the back door to avoid being seen, left no fingerprints on the murder weapon that Dennis had earlier handled, arranged witnesses who will testify they were elsewhere, and relied on Dennis's known dislike of Eddie to make his guilt seem obvious. Concluding his story, Dennis accepts that the evidence against him is strong and that it comes down to his word against theirs. Because of Dennis's earlier comment about wanting to kill Eddie, Maria is forced to arrest him for murder.

== Production ==
The six-part series was announced in July 2025 by Channel 5 and is a co-production between Clapperboard and Blackbox Multimedia with ZDF Studios joining as co-producer & would handle distribution to the series. The series was created by Ian Jarvis and is directed by Simon Delaney. It has writers including Tom Parry, Claire Downes and Yasmine Akram. Executive producers include Chiara Cardoso and Camilla Hammer for Blackbox Multimedia, Robert Franke, and Mike Benson and Andy Morgan for Clapperboard.

The cast is led by John Hannah as retired detective Dennis, and also includes Carolina Bécquer as barmaid Rosa, Ariadna Cabrol, Brian Bovell, and Damian Schedler Cruz. Guest stars include Denise Welch, Tamzin Outhwaite and Alistair McGowan.

Filming took place on location in Benidorm in late 2025.

== Broadcast ==
The series premiered at the Italian Global Series Festival in July 2026.
