= Katharina Thalbach =

German actress and stage director

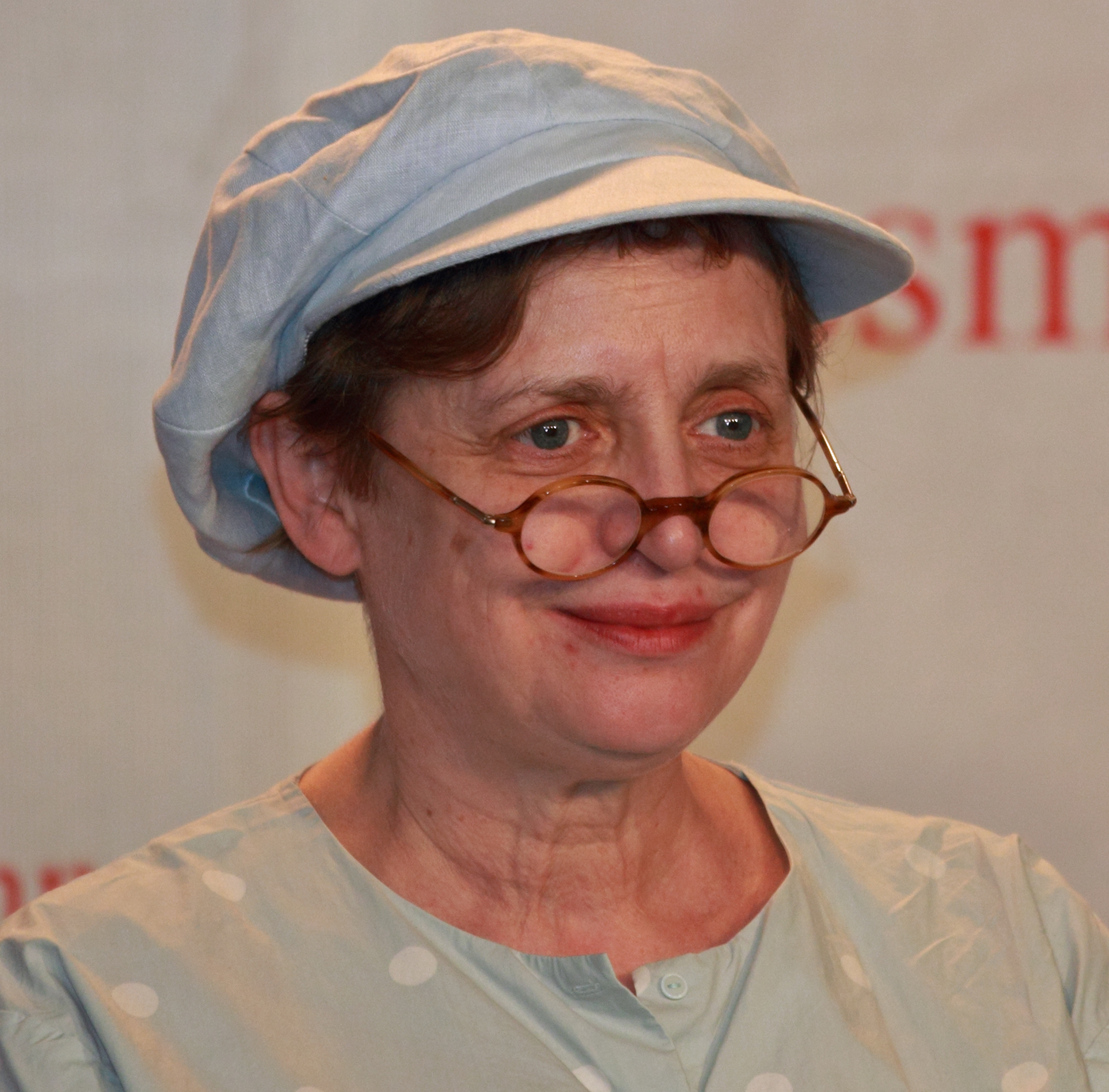
- Thalbach in April 2012
- Born: 19 January 1954 (age 72); East Berlin, East Germany
- Occupations: Actress, stage director
- Spouse: Thomas Brasch (deceased)
- Children: Anna Thalbach

Katharina Thalbach (German: [kataˈʁiːna ˈtaːlbax]; actually Katharina Joachim genannt Thalbach; born 19 January 1954) is a German actress and stage director. She played theater at the Berliner Ensemble and at the [Volksbühne Berlin], and was an actress in the film The Tin Drum. She worked as a theater and opera director.

== Life and work ==
Born in East Berlin, Katharina Thalbach's father Benno Besson was a director, her mother Sabine Thalbach, was an actress. Her half-brother Pierre Besson and her stepmother Ursula Karusseit are actors as well.

At the age of four, Thalbach was playing children's roles on stage, on television, and in films. After the death of her mother in 1966, Helene Weigel took her under her care. In 1967, she made her debut as the whore Betty (later the Polly) in Erich Engel's production of Brecht's Dreigroschenoper. She completed her Abitur at the Max-Planck-Oberschule. She obtained her stage maturity examination (Bühnenreifeprüfung) as a master student of Helene Weigel, Berliner Ensemble. Thalbach played at the Berliner Ensemble and at the Volksbühne Berlin, where her father worked as artistic director.

In 1976, Thalbach moved with her partner Thomas Brasch to West Germany, because he was protesting against Wolf Biermann's expatriation. In West Berlin, she made her debut at the Schillertheater. She acted as a guest star in Hans Lietzau's production of Hauptmann's Der Biberpelz and in Jürgen Flimm's production of Kleist's Das Käthchen von Heilbronn, for which she was voted actress of the year by Theater heute in 1980. She had success with the role of Maria in Volker Schlöndorff's 1979 film adaptation of Grass' sThe Tin Drum. In 1984, she performed the Ophelia in Shakespeare's Hamlet in Zürich.

Since 1987, she worked as a director. Her break through was the award-winning production Macbeth. Since 1997, she was opera director, with productions of Mozart's Don Giovanni and Janáček's The cunning little Vixen in Berlin.

=== Personal life ===
Thalbach's partner Thomas Brasch was an author. Her daughter Anna (born 1973) from a former relationship with Vladimir Weigl and her granddaughter Nellie (born 1995) are actresses. She is married to Uwe Hamacher. She lives in Berlin.

== Awards ==
- 1973 Critics' Prize of the Berliner Zeitung, GDR
- 1973 Actress of the Year, Theater heute
- 1978 Bavarian Film Award for best young actress
- 1980 German Actors' Award from the Federal Directors' Association
- 1980 Actress of the Year, Theater heute
- 1983 IFF Actor Award for Domino
- 1987 German Film Award: Filmband in Gold (Best Actress)
- 1991 Konrad Wolf Prize, Academy of Arts
- 1992 Critics' Award (Barcelona): Best Foreign Production for Macbeth
- 1996 Carl Zuckmayer Medal
- 1997 Adolf Grimme Prize for Dangerous Girlfriend
- 2007 Bavarian Film Award, as best actress for Strike
- 2007 Order of Merit of Berlin
- 2009 Golden Curtain of the Berliner Theaterclub e.V. for As you like it
- 2011 Golden Curtain of the Berliner Theaterclub e.V. for The Abduction of the Sabine Women
- 2012 Star on the Boulevard of Stars
- 2012 German Actors Award (Honorary Award for Lifetime Achievement)
- 2013 Audio Book Prize of the City of Wiesbaden for Der Bärbeiß
- 2013 German Academy for Television for Best Supporting Role (The Minister)
- 2014 German Audiobook Prize (special prize for her life's work)
- 2015 Askania Award
- 2015 Officer's Cross of the Order of Merit of the Federal Republic of Germany
- 2015 German Comedy Award for Best Actress
- 2019 Officer of the Ordre des Arts et des Lettres
- 2020 Ernst Lubitsch Prize

=== Memberships ===
- 1995 Member of the Freie Akademie der Künste Hamburg
- 1999 Member of the Academy of Arts, Berlin
- 2003 Founding member of the Deutsche Filmakademie (German Film Academy)
- Member of the Deutsche Akademie der Darstellenden Künste

== Filmography ==
- Johannes Kepler (1974)
- The Blue Light (1976)
- It is an Old Story
- Schlaraffenland
- Lotte in Weimar
- Die Leiden des jungen Werthers (1976)
- The Second Awakening of Christa Klages (1978)
- Winterspelt (1978)
- The Tin Drum (1979)
- Theodor Chindler (1979, TV miniseries)
- Mosch (1980, TV film)
- Angels of Iron (1981)
- Domino (1982)
- Sophie's Choice (1982)
- Embers (1983)
- Peaceful Days (1984)
- Paradise (1986)
- Flight North (1986)
- Väter und Söhne – Eine deutsche Tragödie (1986, TV miniseries)
- The Case of Mr. Spalt (1988)
- The Passenger – Welcome to Germany (1988)
- Follow Me (1989)
- Good Evening, Mr. Wallenberg (1990)
- The Eighth Day (1990)
- Just a Matter of Duty (1993)
- Kaspar Hauser (1994)
- Back to Square One (1994)
- Silent Night (1995)
- Gefährliche Freundin (1996, TV film)
- Caipiranha (1999)
- Sonnenallee (1999)
- Liebesau – the other Home (2001, TV miniseries)
- Die Manns – Ein Jahrhundertroman (2001, TV miniseries)
- Intrigue and Love (2005, TV film)
- The Robber Hotzenplotz (2006)
- Not All Were Murderers (2006, TV film)
- Strike (2006)
- Deadline – Jede Sekunde zählt (2007, TV series)
- Hands off Mississippi (2007)
- Mrs. Ratcliffe's Revolution (directed by Bille Eltringham, 2007)
- You Are Not Alone (2007)
- The Moon and Other Lovers (2008)
- Friedrich – Ein deutscher König (2012, TV film)
- Forgotten (2012)
- Ruby Red (2013)
- Der Minister (2013, TV film)
- Der Tote im Pub (2013, TV-adaptation of The Man With A Load Of Mischief from the Richard Jury mystery series by Martha Grimes)
- Die Schlikkerfrauen (2014, TV film)
- Big Fish, Small Fish (2015, TV film)
- Mord im Nebel (2015, TV-adaptation of Help the poor Struggler from the Richard Jury mystery series by Martha Grimes)
- Family! (2016, TV film)
- Inspektor Jury spielt Katz und Maus (2017, TV-adaptation of The Deer Leap from the Richard Jury mystery series by Martha Grimes)
- 100 Things (2018)
- Der faule Engel (2019) (p. Addi)
- Ich war noch niemals in New York (2019)
- Insekten - Helden im Verborgenen (2026, narrator)

== Theatre and opera ==
=== Actress ===
- Polly in Dreigroschenoper at the Berliner Ensemble 1969
- Venus/Galatea in Die schöne Helena (ed. Peter Hacks Volksbühne) 1972
- Lovely Rita Schillertheater 1978
- Der Hauptmann von Köpenick
- Das Käthchen von Heilbronn (Schauspiel Köln) 1980
- Mutter Courage und ihre Kinder (1995)
- Frau Jenny Treibel in Frau Jenny Treibel (Hans Otto Theater Potsdam) 2005
- Tante Augusta in Ernst und seine tiefere Bedeutung (Komödie am Kurfürstendamm) 2006 (also stage director)
- Emanuel Striese und Luise Striese in Der Raub der Sabinerinnen (The Abduction of the Sabine Women) (Hans Otto Theater Potsdam) 2006 (also stage director)

=== Director ===
- Macbeth (Schiller Theater Berlin)
- Mann ist Mann and Dreigroschenoper (Thalia Theater Hamburg)
- Der Hauptmann von Köpenick and Romeo und Julia (Maxim Gorki Theater)
- Das schlaue Füchslein and Der Barbier von Sevilla (Deutsche Oper Berlin)
- Don Giovanni (E-Werk Berlin)
- Salome, Aufstieg und Fall der Stadt Mahagonny, Rigoletto (Oper Köln)
- Hänsel und Gretel and Aida (Semperoper Dresden)
- Die Fledermaus (Theater Erfurt)
- Fidelio (Oper Zürich)
- Im Dickicht der Städte (Berliner Ensemble)
- Die Zauberflöte (Seefestspiele Berlin)
- The Resistible Rise of Arturo Ui (Comédie-Française Paris)
- Wie es euch gefällt (Komödie am Kurfürstendamm)
