= The Window Over the Way =

1993 film

- Directed by: Jesús Garay
- Written by: Georges Simenon; Jesús Garay
- Produced by: Isona Passola
- Starring: Juanjo Puigcorbé
- Cinematography: Carles Gusi
- Release date: 9 October 1993
- Running time: 95 minutes
- Country: Spain
- Language: Spanish

The Window Over the Way (Spanish: Los de enfrente) is a 1993 Spanish drama film directed by Jesús Garay. It was entered into the 44th Berlin International Film Festival.

== Cast ==
- Juanjo Puigcorbé as Adil Bey
- Estelle Skornik as Sonia
- Ben Gazzara as John
- Carme Elias
