= Sparkling Fox =

1994 Hong Kong-Chinese film by Wu Ziniu

- Film poster
- Directed by: Wu Ziniu
- Written by: Wang Chunbo; Wu Ziniu
- Produced by: Willy Tsao
- Starring: Gong Hanlin; Tu Men; Li Qinqin; Sharen Gaowa
- Cinematography: Yang Wei
- Edited by: Wang Xiaoming
- Production companies: Simpson Prods. Changchun Film Studio
- Release dates: 20 January 1993 (China); February 1994 (Berlin International Film Festival)
- Running time: 98 minutes
- Countries: Hong Kong; China
- Language: Chinese

Sparkling Fox (Chinese: 火狐, translit. Huo Hu) is a 1993 drama film directed by Wu Ziniu. It was entered into the 44th Berlin International Film Festival, where it won an Honourable Mention.

== Cast ==
- Gong Hanlin
- Tu Men
- Li Qinqin
- Sharen Gaowa
