= Zone of the Dead =

- Directed by: Milan Konjević; Milan Todorović
- Written by: Milan Konjević; Vukota Brajović; Milan Todorović
- Produced by: Milan Todorović; Loris Curci; Vukota Brajovic; Pierfrancesco Fiorenza
- Starring: Ken Foree; Kristina Klebe; Emilio Roso
- Production company: Talking Wolf Productions
- Distributed by: Epic Pictures Group
- Release date: 22 February 2009
- Running time: 96 minutes (101 minutes director's cut)
- Countries: Serbia; Italy; Spain
- Language: English

Zone of the Dead, known also as Apocalypse of the Dead (Serbian: Zona Mrtvih) is a 2009 Serbian horror movie directed by Milan Konjević and Milan Todorović. It stars Ken Foree.

== Plot ==
In 1986 Chernobyl, a mass grave is discovered, with the corpses resembling victims of the Plague. A man cuts himself on a corpse's ribcage and dies of infection minutes afterward. That same man later arises and attacks The Chief of Bureau.

Twenty years later, at a train station, a professor wants to leave Pancevo, Serbia, but all railroads are closed down as part of a supposed military exercise. A train eventually arrives carrying a deadly biohazard agent. Three drunken off-duty soldiers emerge and harass the station guard, taking his weapon and inadvertently rupturing the tank, releasing the agent into the atmosphere. The soldiers and the station guard are infected by the gas, becoming zombies, but the professor escapes.

Meanwhile, INTERPOL Agent Mina Milieus is tasked with transporting a prisoner from Serbia to Belgrade while supervised by Agent Mortimer “Morty” Reyes, an ex-CIA agent, along with his partner, Inspector Dragan “Dra” Belic.

The Chief of Bureau informs the President about the accident at the train station. He advises that the President not bother with evacuation but contain the incident and let the National Guard deal with the rest.

In Pancevo, young reporter Jan leaves a concert with his girlfriend Angela and her friend Jovana. Meanwhile, the professor tries to escape the increasing number of infected. He meets an escaped felon known as Armageddon, who thinks that the Apocalypse arrived and makes it his personal mission to eradicate the zombies. The professor flees and meets Jan and the girls, who allow him to enter their car.

Two INTERPOL vans reach Pancevo as the driver, Petrovic, hits a zombie. When they get out to investigate, more zombies arrive. They attempt to contact Headquarters for backup, but there is no signal. Upon finding the van containing the prisoner, Morty finds that two agents are dead. The prisoner tells them to shoot the zombies in the head, which proves to be successful. He knows how zombies work because his father became one during the Chernobyl incident. In the ensuing battle, Petrovic is devoured, and Dra is bitten. They are forced to take shelter in an abandoned police station.

While reconnoitering the area, Morty and Dra find the professor's group, who joins them. Meanwhile, Armageddon continues his rampage on the zombies, using multiple weapons. He enters a television station and broadcasts his thoughts concerning the apocalypse. Morty decides to activate the generator and find an exit. Dra begins to succumb to infection, resulting in Morty freeing the prisoner and taking him along. After they activate the power, zombies break in, with the prisoner saving Morty from them. Dra dies and reanimates, forcing Mina to shoot him. A distraught Jovana breaks down the barricade, allowing herself to be eaten. The professor chooses death by Morty's gun, as opposed to being eaten.

The group escapes and heads towards a river through train tunnels. At the shipyards, they find sleeping zombies which soon awake. Morty leads the zombies away while the rest of the group reaches a boat. Morty runs out of ammunition and gets trapped inside a train, while Jan takes the boat and abandons Angela. As she is about to be eaten, Armageddon arrives, supplying Mina and the prisoner with weapons. The three kill zombies while Morty escapes the train, taking a gun from the prisoner and helping his fellows.

The President announces that he will cooperate with NATO to bring all those responsible for the bioweapon to justice. He also expects The Chief of Bureau to resign. Mina allows the prisoner to flee. Morty congratulates her on her decision.

Jan takes the boat up the river, only for it to run out of gas. As he goes to the cabin to look for gas, the infected captain arises and tackles him into the river.

== Cast ==
- Ken Foree as CIA Agent Mortimer "Morty" Reyes
- Kristina Klebe as Interpol Agent Mina Milius
- Emilio Roso as Prisoner
- Miodrag Miki Krstović as Inspector Dragan "Dra" Belic
- Vukota Brajović as "Armageddon"
- Bojan Dimitrijević as Rookie Cop
- Ariadna Cabrol as Angela
- Steve Agnew as Professor
- Iskra Brajović as Yovana
- Marko Janjić as Jan
- Živko Grubor as Petrovic
- Nenad Ćirić as The President of Serbia
- Maria Kawecka as President's Secretary
- Vahidin Prelic as Agent Bottin
- Vibrator u rikverc as Band In The Party
- Danilo Bećković as Zombie
- Antoni Solé as TV Director

== Release ==
The movie was released on February 22, 2009. On 1 March 2010 Metrodome released the DVD in the UK and Ireland as Apocalypse of the Dead. On 1 September 2012 Epic Pictures released it on DVD in North America as Apocalypse of the Dead.

== Sequel ==
Zone of the Dead 2 has been planned since 2009.
