= The Tin Drum (film) =

1979 film by Volker Schlöndorff

- Original German film poster
- German: Die Blechtrommel
- Directed by: Volker Schlöndorff
- Written by: Jean-Claude Carrière; Franz Seitz; Volker Schlöndorff
- Based on: The Tin Drum by Günter Grass
- Produced by: Franz Seitz
- Starring: David Bennent; Mario Adorf; Angela Winkler; Katharina Thalbach; Daniel Olbrychski; Charles Aznavour
- Cinematography: Igor Luther
- Edited by: Suzanne Baron
- Music by: Maurice Jarre
- Production companies: Franz Seitz Filmproduktion; Bioskop Film; Argos Films; Jadran Film
- Distributed by: United Artists (West Germany); Argos Films (France); Black Cat (Poland)
- Release dates: 3 May 1979 (Wiesbaden); 19 September 1979 (France); 12 February 1980 (Yugoslavia); 1 September 1992 (Poland)
- Running time: 142 minutes 162 minutes (Director's cut)
- Countries: West Germany; France; Yugoslavia; Poland
- Language: German
- Budget: $3 million
- Box office: $13 million (Germany – 25 million Marks) $2 million or $4 million (U.S.)

The Tin Drum (German: Die Blechtrommel) is a 1979 anti-war film adapted from Günter Grass's 1959 novel, directed by Volker Schlöndorff from a screenplay co-written by Schlöndorff, Jean-Claude Carrière, and Franz Seitz. It stars Mario Adorf, Angela Winkler, Katharina Thalbach, Daniel Olbrychski, and Charles Aznavour, with David Bennent in the lead role of Oskar Matzerath, a young boy who willfully arrests his own physical development and remains in the body of a child even as he enters adulthood.

A darkly comic war drama with magical realist elements, the film follows Oskar, a precocious child living in Danzig, who wields seemingly preternatural abilities. He lives in contempt of the adults around him and witnesses firsthand their potential for cruelty, first via the rise of the Nazi Party and then the subsequent war. The title refers to Oskar's toy drum, which he loudly plays whenever he is displeased or upset. The German-language film was a co-production of West German, French, and Yugoslavian companies.

The film won the Palme d'Or at the 1979 Cannes Film Festival and was a major financial success in West Germany, where it won the German Film Award for Best Fiction Film. It was received more controversially internationally, and was targeted by censorship campaigns in Ireland, Canada, and the United States. Despite the notoriety, the film won Best Foreign Language Film at the 1980 Academy Awards. In 2003, The New York Times placed the film on its Best 1000 Movies Ever list.

== Plot ==
The film centers on Oskar Matzerath, a boy born and raised in the Free City of Danzig prior to and during World War II, who recalls the story's events as an unreliable narrator. Oskar is the son of a half-Polish Kashubian woman, Agnes Bronski, who is married to a German chef named Alfred Matzerath. Agnes secretly carries on an affair with Jan, a Polish Post Office worker and her cousin. Alfred and Jan are friends, and Alfred mostly acts willfully ignorant of his wife's infidelity. Oskar's parentage is uncertain, though he believes he is Jan's son.

The film begins with Agnes' conception by Joseph Kolaizcek, a petty criminal in rural Kashubia (located in modern-day Poland). He hides underneath the skirts of a young woman named Anna Bronski and has sex with her, and she tries to hide her emotions as the German troops searching for him pass close by. She later gives birth to Agnes. Joseph evades the authorities for a year, but when they find him again, he jumps into a lake and is never seen again. Oskar speculates that he either drowned or escaped to America and became a millionaire.

In 1927, on Oskar's third birthday, he is given a tin drum. Reflecting on the foolish antics of his drunken parents and friends, he resolves to stop growing and throws himself down the cellar stairs. From that day on, he does not grow at all. Oskar discovers he can shatter glass with his voice, an ability he often uses when he is upset. On one occasion, he uses his drumming to cause the attendants of a Nazi rally to start dancing a waltz. During a visit to the circus, Oskar befriends Bebra, a performing dwarf who chose to stop growing at age ten.

When Alfred, Agnes, Jan, and Oskar are on an outing to the beach, they see an eel-picker collecting eels from a horse's head used as bait. The sight makes Agnes vomit repeatedly. Alfred buys some of the eels and prepares them for dinner that night. When he insists that Agnes eat them, she becomes distraught and retreats to the bedroom. Jan enters and comforts her, all within earshot of Oskar, who is hiding in the closet. She calmly returns to the dinner table and eats the eels. Over the next few days, she binges on fish. Oskar's grandmother helps reveal that Agnes is worried her pregnancy is due to her relations with Jan. In anger, Agnes vows that the child will never be born. She dies shortly thereafter, seemingly from accumulated stress.

At the funeral, Oskar encounters Sigismund Markus, the kindly Jewish toy seller who supplies him with replacement drums, and who was also in love with Agnes. Markus is ordered by two of the mourners to leave because he is Jewish; Nazism is on the rise, and the Jewish and Polish residents of Danzig are under increasing pressure. Markus later commits suicide after his shop is vandalized and a synagogue is burned down by SA men.

On 1 September 1939, Oskar and Jan go looking for Kobyella, who can repair Oskar's drum. Jan slips into the Polish Post Office, despite a Nazi cordon, and participates in an armed standoff against the Nazis. During the ensuing battle, Kobyella is fatally shot, and Jan is wounded. They play Skat until Kobyella dies, and the Germans capture the building. Oskar is taken home, while Jan is arrested and later executed.

Alfred hires Maria, a sixteen-year-old German girl, to work in his shop, and Oskar seduces her. When he later discovers Alfred having sex with her, he bursts into the room and makes Alfred ejaculate inside her (when he was expected to pull out, to avoid getting her pregnant), causing Maria to become angry at Alfred when he blames Oskar for the inadvertent insemination. While rinsing her vagina in an attempt to remove the deposited semen, Maria and Oskar fight, and he hits her in the groin. She later gives birth to a son, who Oskar is convinced is his. Oskar also has a brief sexual relationship with Lina Greff, the wife of the local grocer and scoutmaster. It is implied that Lina was sexually frustrated, as her husband preferred to spend more time with the Hitler Youth boys. Lina's husband later commits suicide after a neighbor catches him "playing" with those boys and reports him to the Nazi authorities.

During World War II, Oskar meets Bebra and Roswitha, another dwarf performer in Bebra's successful troupe. Oskar decides to join them, using his glass-shattering voice as part of the act. Oskar and Roswitha have an affair, but she is killed by artillery fire during the Allied invasion of Normandy while they are on tour.

Oskar returns home. Much of Danzig has been destroyed, and the Russians are fast approaching. He gives Maria's three-year-old son Kurt a tin drum like his own. Some Russian soldiers break into the cellar where Oskar's family and Lina are hiding. They gang-rape Lina, and Alfred is killed by a soldier after he swallows and chokes violently on his Nazi party pin, apparently betrayed by Oskar. Alfred's shop is taken over by Mariusz Fajngold, a Jewish survivor of Treblinka, who arranges a modest funeral for Alfred.

During Alfred's burial, Oskar decides to grow up and throws his drum into the grave. As he does, Kurt throws a stone at his head, causing Oskar to fall into the grave as well. Afterwards, an attendee announces that Oskar is growing again, though he is severely injured. Oskar, Maria, and Kurt leave for Germany, but his grandmother stays in Poland.

== Cast ==
- David Bennent as Oskar Matzerath
- Mario Adorf as Alfred Matzerath
- Angela Winkler as Agnes Matzerath
- Katharina Thalbach as Maria Matzerath
- Daniel Olbrychski as Jan Bronski
- Berta Drews as Anna Koljaiczek (née Bronski)
  - Tina Engel as young Anna
- Heinz Bennent as Greff
- Ernst Jacobi as Löbsack
- Andréa Ferréol as Lina Greff
- Charles Aznavour as Sigismund Markus
- Roland Teubner as Joseph Koljaiczek
- Ilse Pagé as Gretchen Scheffler
- Werner Rehm as Scheffler
- Käte Jaenicke as Mother Truczinski
- Helmut Brasch as Old Heilandt
- Otto Sander as Musician Meyn
- Wigand Witting as Herbert Truczinski
- Mariella Oliveri as Roswitha
- Fritz Hakl as Bebra
- Marek Walczewski as Schugger-Leo
- Wojciech Pszoniak as Mariusz Fajngold
- Gerda Blisse as Miss Spollenhauer
- Henning Schlüter as Dr. Hollatz
- Mieczysław Czechowicz as Kobyella
- Jean-Claude Carrière as Rasputin (uncredited)
- Günter Meisner as a Gestapo racial purity officer (uncredited)

== Production ==
The film was mostly shot in West Germany and Berlin, including at the Spandau Studios. Some street scenes, particularly ones concerning the landmarks of Danzig, were shot on-location in Gdańsk, Poland. The Polish communist authorities gave the crew little time in the country, since the novel itself had been banned in Eastern Bloc countries. While filming in Poland, a production assistant was arrested by the authorities when trying to buy eels for a scene in the film from fishing boats, accused of attempting to sabotage the national industries. The scenes with the Polish Post Office were shot in Zagreb, Croatia, as were several generic street scenes. The scenes in France were shot on sets.

Schlöndorff was advised by Grass during much of the film's pre-production and the writing of the script, and Grass is credited in the film for "editing and supplementing" the dialogue.

David Bennent was discovered for the role of Oskar after Schlöndorff discussed with a doctor which illnesses might cause a child to stop growing at an early age, and the doctor brought up the case of the son of actor Heinz Bennent, surprising Schlöndorff, who knew and had worked with Heinz, but did not know about David's condition.

During filming, there was a supposed love affair between Angela Winkler and Daniel Olbrychski, and a romantic rivalry between Fritz Hakl, who played Bebra, and the fiancé of Mariella Oliveri, who played Roswitha.

== Reception ==
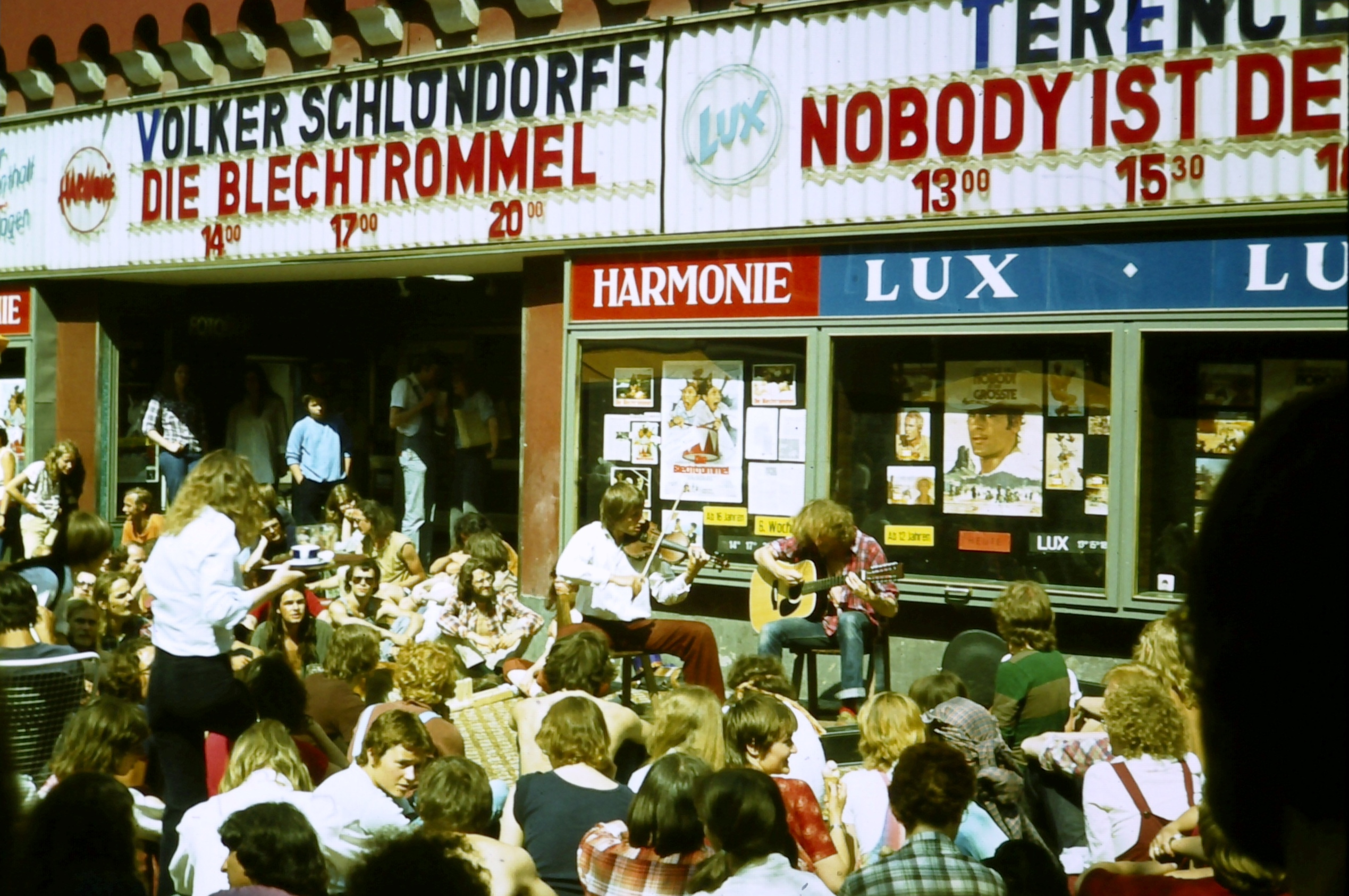
Heidelberg, 1979: Outside a cinema showing the film

The Tin Drum was one of the most financially successful German films of the 1970s, taking in 25 million marks at the German box office. New World Pictures paid $400,000 for the U.S. rights, and the film became the highest-grossing German film in the United States, with a gross of $4 million, beating the record set a year earlier by Rainer Werner Fassbinder's The Marriage of Maria Braun.

Roger Ebert of the Chicago Sun-Times awarded the film two stars out of four, writing: "I must confess that the symbolism of the drum failed to involve me." He continued:

And here we are at the central problem of the movie: Should I, as a member of the audience, decide to take the drum as, say, a child's toy protest against the marching cadences of the German armies? Or should I allow myself to be annoyed by the child's obnoxious habit of banging on it whenever something's not to his liking? Even if I buy the wretched drum as a Moral Symbol, I'm still stuck with the kid as a pious little bastard.

Vincent Canby of The New York Times called the film "a seriously responsible adaptation of a gargantuan novel, but it's an adaptation that has no real life of its own. There are a number of things seen or said on the screen that, I suspect, will not make much sense to anyone who isn't familiar with the novel ... However, because the story it tells is so outsized, bizarre, funny and eccentric, the movie compels attention."

Gary Arnold of The Washington Post wrote that the film "will be hard to beat as the season's most prestigious bad idea for a movie," stating that Oskar "doesn't have a personality forceful enough to unify the rambling continuity or replace the narrative voice and complex of meanings that gave the book intellectual vitality and authority."

Gene Siskel of the Chicago Tribune gave the film a full four stars out of four and called it "quite shattering", with "one striking image after another." Charles Champlin of the Los Angeles Times declared that it was "like few films since Citizen Kane—a combination of stunning logistics and technique and of humanistic content that is terrifically affecting."

On the review aggregator website Rotten Tomatoes, 84% of 25 critics' reviews of the film are positive, with an average rating of 7.5/10. Metacritic, which uses a weighted average, assigned the film a score of 63 out of 100, based on 11 critics, indicating "generally favorable" reviews. In 2003, The New York Times placed the film on its Best 1000 Movies Ever list.

=== Accolades ===
At the 1979 Cannes Film Festival, the film shared the Palme d'Or with Apocalypse Now; The Tin Drum was the first film directed by a German to win the award. In 1980, the film became the first film either from Germany or in German to win the Academy Award for Best Foreign Language Film.

Award	Year	Category	Recipient(s)	Result	Ref(s)
Academy Awards	1980	Best Foreign Language Film	West Germany	Won	
Bodil Awards	1980	Best European Film	Volker Schlöndorff	Won	
Cannes Film Festival	1979	Palme d'Or	Volker Schlöndorff	Won	
César Awards	1980	Best Foreign Film	Volker Schlöndorff	Nominated	
German Film Award	1979	Best Fiction Film	Volker Schlöndorff	Won	
German Film Award	1979	Best Director	Volker Schlöndorff	Nominated	
German Film Award	1979	Best Actor	Mario Adorf	Nominated	
German Film Award	1979	Best Actress	Angela Winkler	Nominated	
German Film Award	1979	Best Supporting Actress	Katharina Thalbach	Nominated	
Goldene Leinwand	1980	Goldene Leinwand	Volker Schlöndorff	Won	
Los Angeles Film Critics Association	1980	Best Foreign Language Film	Volker Schlöndorff	Won	
National Board of Review	1981	Best Foreign Language Film	Volker Schlöndorff	Won	
National Board of Review	1981	Top Foreign Films	Volker Schlöndorff	Won	

== Censorship ==
The film features scenes in which David Bennent, then 11 years of age and playing a stunted 16-year-old, licks effervescing sherbet powder from the navel of Katharina Thalbach, then 24 years of age and playing a 16-year-old. Subsequently, Bennent appears to have oral sex and then intercourse with Thalbach.

In 1980, the film was first cut, and then banned as child pornography, by the Ontario Censor Board in Canada.

Similarly, on June 25, 1997, following a ruling made by State District Court Judge Richard Freeman, who had reportedly only viewed a single isolated scene of the film, The Tin Drum was banned in Oklahoma County, Oklahoma, citing the state's obscenity laws for portraying underage sexuality. All copies of the film in Oklahoma City were confiscated, and at least one person who had rented the film on video tape was threatened with prosecution. Michael Camfield, at the time a member of the Oklahoma chapter of the American Civil Liberties Union, filed a lawsuit against the police department on July 4, 1997, alleging that the tape had been illegally confiscated and his rights infringed.

There ensued a high-profile series of hearings on the film's merits as a whole versus the controversial scenes, and the role of the judge as censor. The film emerged vindicated, and most copies were returned within a few months. By 2001, all the cases had been settled, and the film was again legally available in Oklahoma County. This incident is covered in the documentary film Banned in Oklahoma, which is included in the 2004 Criterion Collection DVD release of The Tin Drum.

== See also ==
- List of submissions to the 52nd Academy Awards for Best Foreign Language Film
- List of German submissions for the Academy Award for Best Foreign Language Film
- Films dealing with Nazism and sexuality
