= Wu Ziniu =

Chinese film director (born 1952)

- Born: 31 October 1952 (age 73); Leshan, Sichuan, China
- Occupations: Film director, screenwriter
- Years active: 1980s–present
- Awards: Silver Bear-Jury Grand Prix; 1988 Evening BellGolden Rooster Awards – Best Director; 1989 Evening Bell

Chinese name
- Traditional Chinese: 吳子牛
- Simplified Chinese: 吴子牛
Transcriptions
Standard Mandarin
- Hanyu Pinyin: Wú Zìniú

Wu Ziniu (born 31 October 1952), is a Chinese film director and a member of the "Fifth Generation" film movement, a movement of filmmakers who graduated from the Beijing Film Academy in the early 1980s. Unlike his better-known contemporaries, Zhang Yimou and Chen Kaige, who made their names with historical dramas, Wu Ziniu is best known for his early war films. His 1985 film on the Sino-Vietnamese War, Dove Tree, was the first film by a Fifth Generation director to be banned by the Chinese government.

== Directorial career ==
A member of the 1982 graduating class of the Beijing Film Academy, Wu was assigned to the Xiaoxing Film Studio. There he directed four films, including the children's film, The Candidate, the war films Secret Decree and Dove Tree, and the drama, The Last Day of Winter. After The Last Day of Winter, Wu expanded to other studios, working with the August First Film Studio to produce the war film, Evening Bell, which, despite the heavy hand of censorship, managed to win several international awards, including the Silver Bear - Special Jury Prize at the 39th Berlin International Film Festival.

Throughout the late 1980s, Wu would continue to direct films, often highlighting the brutality of war and the effect on civilians, as in 1988's Joyous Heroes and its sequel Between Life and Death. With the 1990s, Wu would draw on foreign capital, primarily from Hong Kong to help produce his historical films Sparkling Fox and The Big Mill.

== Filmography ==
=== Film ===
Year	Title	Notes
1983	The Candidate 候补队员	Directorial debut; co-directed with Chen Lu; also known as A Probation Member
1984	Secret Decree 喋血黑谷	Co-directed with Li Jingmin
1985	Dove Tree 鸽子树	
1986	The Last Day of Winter 最后一个冬日	
1988	Evening Bell 晚钟	
1988	Joyous Heroes 欢乐英雄	Also known as To Die Like a Man
1988	Between Life and Death 阴阳界	
1990	The Big Mill 大磨坊	
1992	Mountains of the Sun 太阳山	
1993	Sparkling Fox 火狐	Won an Honourable Mention at the 44th Berlin International Film Festival
1995	Don't Cry, Nanking 南京1937	Also known as Nanking 1937
1999	The National Anthem 国歌	
2000	The Sino-Dutch War 1661 英雄郑成功	Also known as Hero Zheng Chenggong

=== Television ===
Year	Title	Notes
2005	Carol of Zhenguan 贞观长歌	Also known as The Story of Zhen Guan
2007	Ming Dynasty 天下	
2017	Yu Chenglong 于成龙	
