= Pan Changjiang =

Chinese skit actor, sitcom actor and TV director

- 潘长江
- Born: July 1957 (age 67–68); Dongning County, Mudanjiang, Heilongjiang, China
- Education: Pingju Troupe of Tieling County
- Occupation(s): Actor, singer, host
- Years active: 1982–present
- Notable work: Hands Up! Adventure of the King; Track Aduowan
- Spouse: Yang Yun (m. 1981)
- Children: Pan Yang (daughter)
- Parent(s): Pan Linsheng; Wang Jingping

Chinese name
- Traditional Chinese: 潘長江
- Simplified Chinese: 潘长江
Transcriptions
Standard Mandarin
- Hanyu Pinyin: Pān Chángjīang

Pan Changjiang (born July 1957) is a Chinese actor and more recently TV director, known for playing in skits and sitcoms on TV. In his early years, he appeared regularly in the CCTV New Year's Gala.

== Early life ==
Pan was born to an acting family in Dongning County, Mudanjiang, Heilongjiang, the son of Wang Jingping (Chinese: 王晶平), and Pan Linsheng (Chinese: 潘林生). In 1979, he was accepted to the Pingju Troupe of Tieling County, where he majored in acting.

== Personal life ==
On 31 August 1981, Pan married civil servant Yang Yun (Chinese: 杨云) in Dongning County. Their daughter, Pan Yang (Chinese: 潘阳), was born in 1985.

== Filmography ==
=== Film ===
Year	Chinese title	English title	Role	Notes
1992	球迷心窍		Jia Dage	
1994	宫廷斗鸡			
1994	三女休夫		Que Lihou	
1995	飞虎队	American Volunteer Group	Huang Er	
1999	荆轲刺秦王	The Emperor and the Assassin	Prison official	
1999	明天我爱你		Hao Sanduo	
2005	举起手来	Hands Up!	Private First Class Nakamura	
2005	杨德财征婚		Yang Decai	
2007	别惹小孩	Don't Provoke Kids	Father	
2007	大内咪咪探		De Hangda	
2009	大胃王	King of the Eaters	San Hao	
2009	巧斗鬼子			
2010	龙凤店	Adventure of the King	Li Xiaochong	
2010	举起手来2	Track Aduowan	Private First Class Nakamura	
2011	车在囧途	The Unfortunate Car	Male leader	
2015	斗地主	Fight Against Landlords		
2019		The Knight of Shadows: Between Yin and Yang		

=== Television ===
Year	English title	Chinese title	Role	Notes
1987		八旗子弟	Da Hangda	
1995		雨天有故事	Xia Yutian	
1998	Journey to the West	西游记	Luohan	
2001		导弹旅长	Erzhu	
2001		东北一家人		
2002		炊事班的故事	Pan Huanghe	
2003		开心就好：男人无烦恼	Xiao Pinwang	
2004		一手托两家		
2004		笑笑茶楼	Long Dalong	
2004		大学生宿舍		
2005		正月里来是新春	Cai Xiaowu	
2006	Legend of Shaolin Temple	少林寺传奇	County magistrate	
2006		别拿豆包不当干粮	Zhao Xifu	
2009		清凌凌的水蓝莹莹的天	Qian Dabao	
2009		安逗与黑仔	The thief	
2009		我们的梦工厂		
2010	The Legend of Zhong Kui	钟馗传说	Cheng Menxue	
2010		新时代警察	Pyramid selling gang leader	
2010		能人冯天贵	Feng Tiangui	
2011		新雷锋班的故事		
2011		相亲相爱		
2012		聪明小空空	Wang Zhankui	

=== CCTV New Year's Gala ===
Year	English title	Chinese title	Cast	Notes
1986	Grand Light	大观灯	Zhao Benshan	
1992	Troupes	草台班子	Guo Chang, Li Shulan	
1993	The Bridge	桥	Huang Xiaojuan	
1996		过河	Yan Shuping	
1996		迎亲	Yan Shuping	
1998	A Stamp	一张邮票》	Hei Mei, Dashan	
1999		减肥变奏曲	Lydia Shum, Eric Tsang	
2000	My Deskmate	同桌的她	Gong Hanlin, Brenda Wang	
2001		三号楼长她	Huang Xiaojuan, Yan Xuejing	
2005		魔力奥运她	Liu Yajin, Chen Hanbai, Zou Dejiang	
2005		大观园里闹元宵	Gao Xiumin, Lin Yongjian	
2006		新五女拜寿	Li Changchun, Yu Kuizhi, Li Shengsu, Yuan Huiqin	
2006	Disney Sing It	想唱就唱	Huang Xiaojuan	
2007		将爱情进行到底	Jin Yuting	
2007		相女婿	Yan Xuejing	
2008	Home New Year	回家过年	Huang Xiaojuan	
2009	Wedding Dress Photos	婚纱照	Yan Xuejing, Zhao Liang	
2010	The Fairy Tale	童话	Yan Xuejing, Chen Longhe	
2011		不是两瓶酒的事儿	Hong Jiantao, Sheng Zhe	
2011	A Happy Family	快乐一家人	Yang Yun, Pan Yang, Pan Linsheng, Wang Jingping	
2012		献爱心	Hong Jiantao, Yan Shuping	
2012		你在按揭幸福吗	Gong Hanlin, Tang Jing	
2013		想跳就跳	Cai Ming	

== Awards ==
Year	Work	Award	Result	Notes
1989	Zhu Bajie	3rd International Youth Drama Festival - Individual Performance Award	Won	
2001	I Love You	Hundred Flowers Award for Best Actor	Won	
