= Hilmar Thate =

German actor

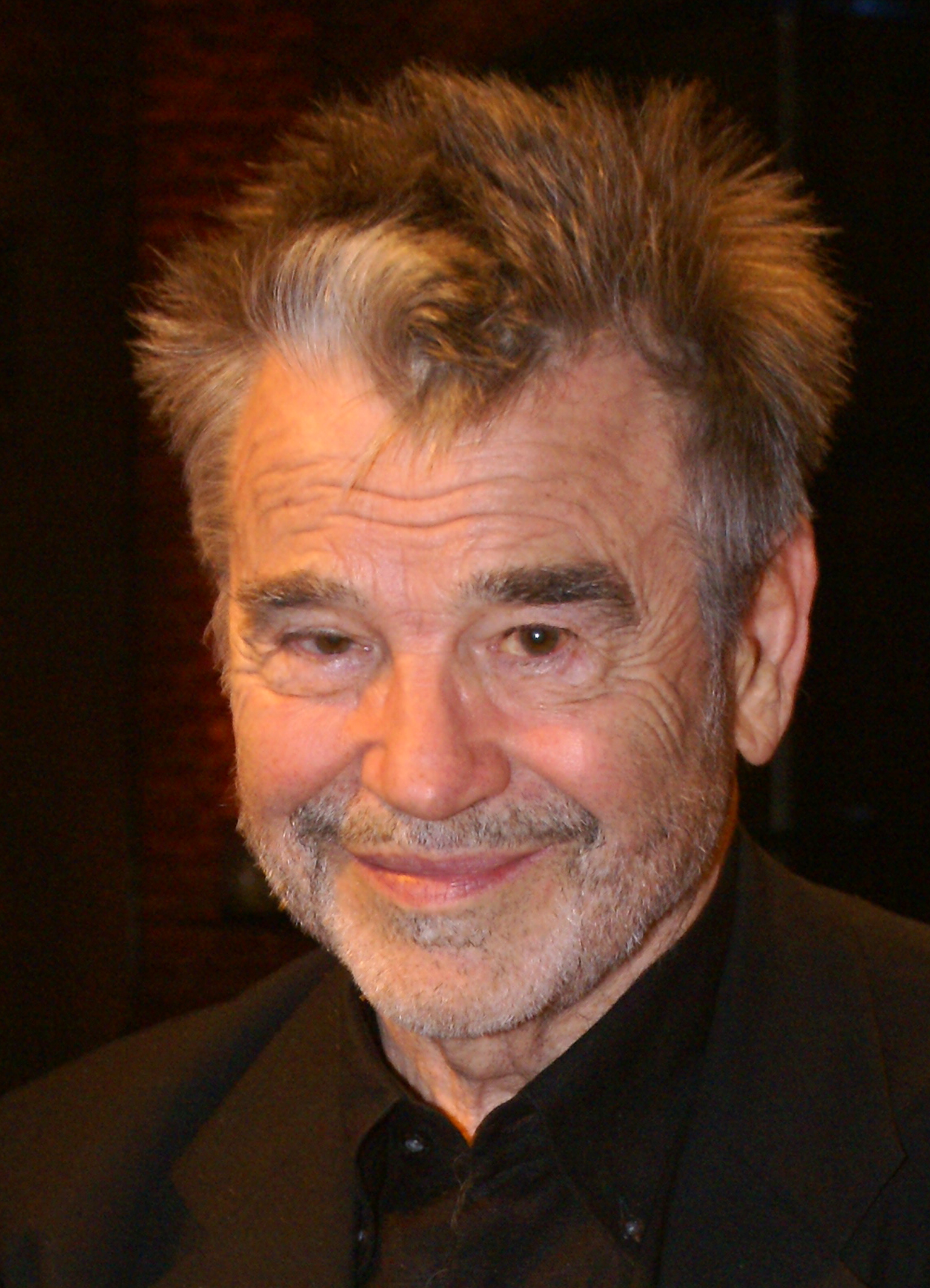
- Born: 17 April 1931; Dölau, Saalkreis, Weimar Republic
- Died: 14 September 2016 (aged 85); Berlin, Germany
- Occupation: Actor
- Years active: 1955–2016

Hilmar Thate (17 April 1931 – 14 September 2016) was a German actor. He appeared in 40 films and television shows between 1955 and 2016.

== Filmography ==
Year	Title	Role	Notes
1955	Once Is Never	Buhlemann	
1958	Buhlemann		
1958	The Sailor's Song	Ludwig Bartuschek	
1960	Leute mit Flügeln	Henne	
1961	Mutter Courage und ihre Kinder	Der Chronist	
1961	The Gleiwitz Case	KZ-Häftling	
1961	Professor Mamlock	Rolf Mamlock	
1964	Preludio 11	Commandante Suarez	Voice
1964	Der geteilte Himmel	Ernst Wendland	
1974	Elective Affinities	Eduard	
1978	Fleur Lafontaine	Philipp Pommeranz	
1980	Don Juan, Karl-Liebknecht-Straße 78	Andrej Wischnewsky	
1981	Angels of Iron	Gustav Völpel	
1982	Veronika Voss	Robert Krohn	
1998	The King of St. Pauli	Rudi Kranzow	TV miniseries
1999	Paths in the Night	Walter	
2004	The Ninth Day	Bischof Philippe	
2005	Hitler Cantata	Hans Broch	
