= Hands Up! (2003 film) =

- Film poster
- Traditional Chinese: 舉起手來
- Simplified Chinese: 举起手来
- Hanyu Pinyin: Jǔqǐ Shǒulaí
- Directed by: Feng Xiaoning
- Written by: Feng Xiaoning
- Produced by: Han Sanping
- Starring: Pan Changjiang; Guo Da; Liu Wei
- Cinematography: Feng Xiaoning; Gang Qiang; Zheng Jie
- Edited by: Feng Xiaoning; Zhang Xiaoning
- Music by: Li Ge
- Production company: China Film Group Corporation
- Distributed by: China Film Group Corporation
- Release date: 2003 (China)
- Running time: 90 minutes
- Country: China
- Languages: Mandarin; Cantonese

Hands Up! is a 2003 Chinese historical comedy film directed and written by Feng Xiaoning, and produced by Han Sanping. The film stars Pan Changjiang, Guo Da, and Liu Wei. It based on the Second Sino-Japanese War.

== Cast ==
- Pan Changjiang as the Imperial Japanese Army officer.
- Guo Da as Uncle Guo, a Chinese farmer and underground traffic policeman.
- Liu Wei as "Me"/ Mother/ Grandmother. The narrator of the film.

=== Others ===
- Hu Xiaoguang as The Tycoon.
- Li Ming as The interpreter of the Tycoon
- Bao De as the captain of Eighth Route Army.
- Zhang Xiaoning as an Imperial Japanese Army soldier.
- Li Baoguo as an Imperial Japanese Army soldier.
- Zheng Jie as an Imperial Japanese Army soldier.
- Gang Qiang as an Imperial Japanese Army soldier.
- Liu Damao as a Chinese kid.
- Liu Ermao as a Chinese kid.

== Production ==
The film took place in Panyan Park of Xinxiang city, Henan province.
