= Feistritz bei Anger =

- Former municipality
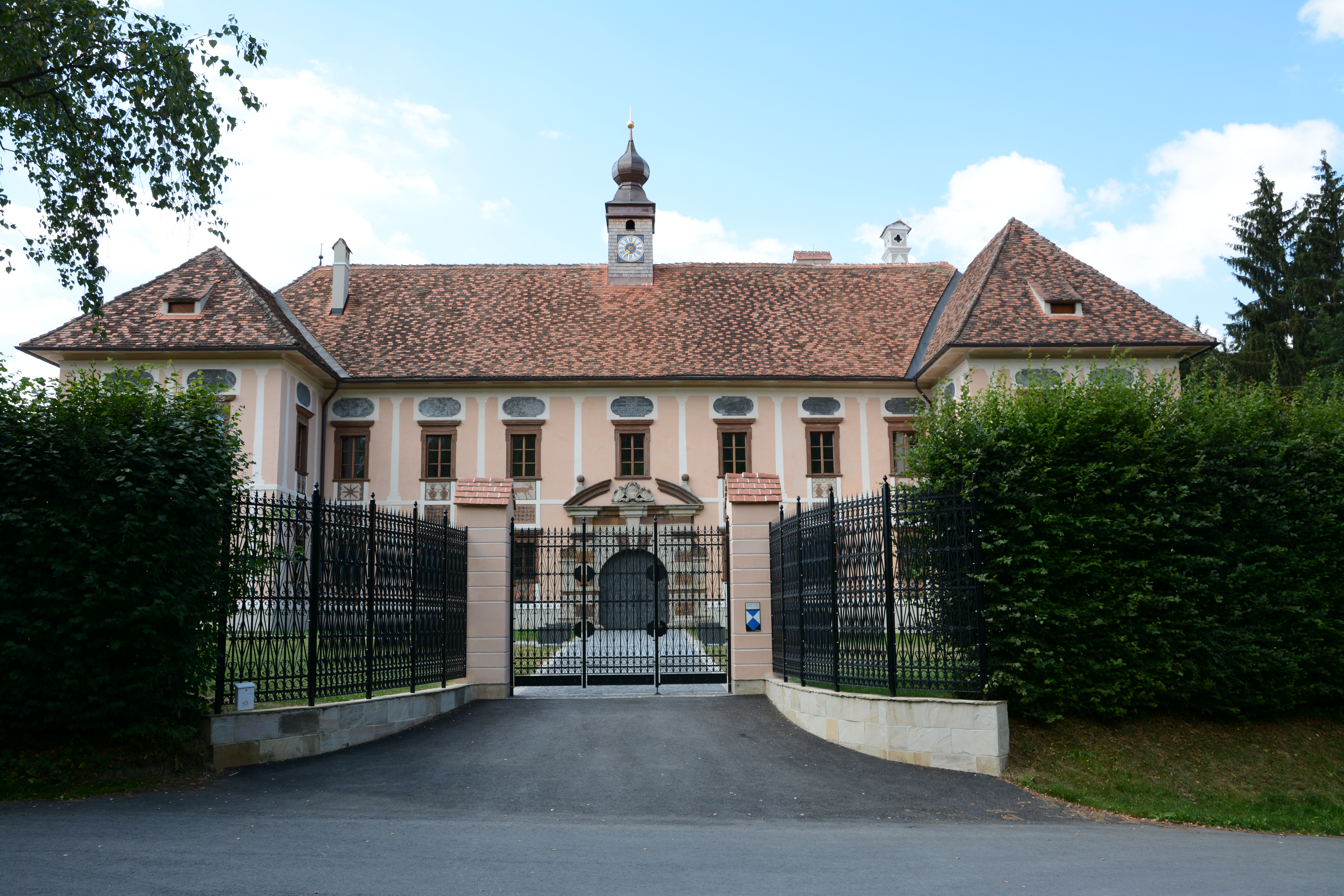
- Kuelml Castle

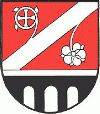
- Coat of arms

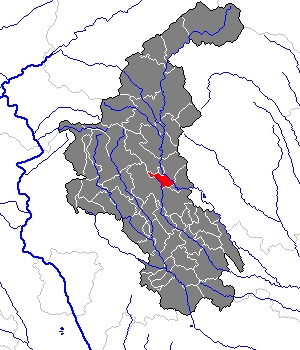
- Location within Weiz district

- Location within Austria
- Coordinates: 47°15′00″N 15°41′00″E
- Country: Austria
- State: Styria
- District: Weiz

Area
  - Total: 8.04 km^{2} (3.10 sq mi)
- Elevation: 470–1,100 m (1,540–3,610 ft)

Population (1 January 2016)
  - Total: 1,069
  - Density: 133/km^{2} (344/sq mi)
- Time zone: UTC+1 (CET)
  - Summer (DST): UTC+2 (CEST)
- Postal code: 8184
- Area code: 03175
- Vehicle registration: WZ
- Website: www.feistritz-anger.at

Feistritz bei Anger is a former municipality in the district of Weiz in the Austrian state of Styria. Since the 2015 Styria municipal structural reform, it is part of the municipality Anger.

== Geography ==
Feistritz lies about 35 km northeast of Graz, 10 km east of Weiz, and 10 km west of the Stubenbergsee.
