= Ilse Pagé =

German actress

- Born: 29 May 1939; Berlin, Germany
- Died: 19 June 2017 (aged 78); Berlin, Germany
- Occupation: Actress
- Years active: 1957-1993

Ilse Pagé (29 May 1939 – 19 June 2017) was a German film and television actress.

== Selected filmography ==
- Berlin, Schoenhauser Corner (1957) - Angela
- A Doctor of Conviction (1959) - Ein junges Mädchen
- ...und noch frech dazu! (1960) - Helga
- Und sowas nennt sich Leben (1961) - Gaby
- Black Gravel (1961) - Karla
- Davon träumen alle Mädchen (1961) - Conny
- Der Traum von Lieschen Müller (1961) - Evchen
- Love Has to Be Learned (1963)
- The House in Montevideo (1963) - Atlanta
- Apache Gold (1963) - Nscho-tschi (voice, uncredited)
- Tales of a Young Scamp (1964) - Geheimratstochter
- Serenade for Two Spies (1965) - Tamara (voice)
- The Trap Snaps Shut at Midnight (1966) - Telefonistin (uncredited)
- Honour Among Thieves (1966) - Edith
- Juventude Rebelde (1966) - Yasmine (voice, uncredited)
- The Hunchback of Soho (1966) - Jane
- Creature with the Blue Hand (1967) - Miss Mabel Finley
- The College Girl Murders (1967) - Sekretärin
- Forty Eight Hours to Acapulco (1967) - Mädchen auf Gruners Party
- The Hound of Blackwood Castle (1968) - Miss Mabel Finley
- Im Banne des Unheimlichen (1968) - Miss Mabel Finley
- The Gorilla of Soho (1968) - Miss Mabel Finley
- Up the Establishment (1969) - Inge
- The Man with the Glass Eye (1969) - Miss Mabel Finley
- Helgalein (1969)
- Hurra, wir sind mal wieder Junggesellen! (1971) - Putzkolonnenführerin
- Heute hau'n wir auf die Pauke (1972) - Gigi (voice)
- The Tin Drum (1979) - Gretchen Scheffler
- Warum die UFOs unseren Salat klauen (1980)
- Angels of Iron (1981) - Frau Gerti Völpel
- Domino (1982) - Frau Moll
- Die Spider Murphy Gang (1983) - Frau Dr. Ilona Weiß
- Komplizinnen (1987)
- Der Commander (1988) - Barmaid (uncredited)
- Bei mir liegen Sie richtig (1990) - Mrs. Moschmann
- Die Lok (1993) - Bob's Mutter
- Im Himmel hört dich niemand weinen (1993) - (final film role)

=== Dubbing ===
- The V.I.P.s (1963) – Gloria Gritti
