= Cai Ming (actress) =

Chinese singer, actress, and comedian

- 蔡明
- Born: 21 October 1961 (age 64); Beijing, China
- Occupations: Sketch comedy performer, actress, singer
- Years active: 1973-present
- Notable work: Haixia
- Spouse: Ding Qiuxing (m. 1985)
- Children: Son: Ding Ding
- Parent(s): Father: Cai Yuping; Mother: Tian Hua
- Awards: China Dazhong Television Award for the Most Favorite Actresses; 2000; 1st Huading Award for Best Chinese Quyi Actress; 2007; 10th China International Children's Festival - Child Star; 2009; 4th Huading Award for the Most Favorite Actresses; 2010

Cai Ming (Chinese: 蔡明; pinyin: Cài Míng; born 21 October 1961) is a Chinese singer, actress, and sketch comedy performer.

Cai is notable for performing sketch comedy in CCTV New Year's Gala since 1991.

== Biography ==
Cai was born into an educated family in Beijing on October 21, 1961, and she is of Hui ethnic group, the daughter of Tian Hua (Chinese: 田华), a doctor, and Cai Yuping (Chinese: 蔡毓平), a professor at the Capital University of Economics and Business.

After graduating from junior high school, Cai entered the Beijing Film Studio Troupe.

In 1973, she starred in Xie Tieli's film Haixia (Chinese: 海霞), and this made her become famous overnight.

Cai performed sketch comedy in CCTV New Year's Gala since 1991.

Since July 2020, she has been working as a voice actress for Virtual YouTuber Nanako, who belongs to VirtuaReal Star.

== Personal life ==
At the age of 22, Cai met her husband Ding Qiuxing (Chinese: 丁秋星), who is a Chinese director, they married in 1985, their son, Ding Ding (Chinese: 丁丁), was born in July 1986.

== Works ==
=== Discography ===
- Across (Chinese: 跨越), Cai Ming's debut studio album, was released on 1 January 2004.

=== Film ===
Year	English title	Chinese title	Role	Cast	Ref
1973	Haixia	海霞	Haixia	Wu Haiyan, Chen Qiang, Tian Chong	
1980	Passenger with Handcuff	戴手铐的旅客	Wei Xiaoming	Yu Yang	
1984	Ways To Make Fortunes	生财有道	Qing Xiu	Chen Qiang	
1985	Tears in Suzhou	泪洒姑苏	Xiao Ling	Wu Qianqian	
1989	The Egg-Trafficking Army	倒蛋部队	a young girl	Guo Da	
1990	Love	恋爱角	a young girl	Zhang Jinlai, Guo Da, Fu Yiwei	
1991	War of Divorce	离婚大战	Yingzi	Ge You, Hou Yaohua	
2005	Life and Death Plunder	生死劫	aunt	Zhou Xun, Wu Jun, Su Xiaoming	
2012	A Happy Chinese New Year	亲家过年	Cai Yun	Wen Zhang, Zhang Fengyi, Cong Shan	
2015	Hot Blood Band	热血男人帮			
2024	A Place Called Silence	默杀	Mother Xu		

=== Television ===
Year	English title	Chinese title	Role	Cast	Ref
1993	Woman Heart	女人心	Ding Dong		
1994	Contemporary Family	临时家庭	Zhou Xingxing		
1994	I Love My Family	我爱我家	Yan Hong		
1999	Cao Cao	曹操	Yu Jin		
1999	Love Me	爱我好不好	Meng Xiaoqiang		
2000	Tie the Knot	酒结良缘	Xiaowan's mother		
2000	Idler: Sister Ma	闲人马大姐	Sister Ma		
2000	Sister Ma and her Neighborhoods	马大姐和邻居们	Sister Ma		
2001	All in the Family	东北一家人	Gao Wa	Gong Hanlin	
2002	Chinese Communist Party Member: Sister Ma	党员马大姐	Sister Ma	Gong Hanlin	
2003	Get Married with Children	带着孩子结婚	Liu Xiaohong		
2004	Harmony Brings Wealth 2	家和万事兴之双喜临门	Tao Lan		
2006	Full of It 2	十全十美之有梦年代	Zhu Liyun		
2006		绝代妖后	Hao Ge's wife		
2007	The Biography of Sister Ma	马大姐新传	Sister Ma		
2008		清明上河	guest	Guo Da	
2008	The Amateur Detective	业余侦探	Yang Xia		
2008	Get Knocked Up	好孕来临	Dandan's mother		
2009	Superman: Sister Ma	超人马大姐	Sister Ma		
2009	Dazzled	眼花缭乱	Wu Shasha		
2010		鸡毛蒜皮没小事	Aunt Zhang		
2010	Men of Ronghe Town	荣河镇的男人们	He San'gu	Guo Da	
2012	A Strange Family	奇异家庭	Gai Lan		
2013		老妈的三国时代	Cao Meihua		

=== CCTV New Year's Gala ===
Year	English title	Chinese title	Cast	Ref
1991	Stranger	陌生人	Gong Hanlin	
1993	Huangtupo	黄土坡	Guo Da	
1994	Overseas Call	越洋电话	Guo Da	
1995	Father	父亲	Guo Da, Zhao Baole, Yu Hailun	
1996	The Story of the Robot	机器人趣话	Guo Da	
1997	Spring Festival	过年	Guo Da, Guo Donglin	
1999	Ball Game Fan	球迷	Guo Da, Guo Donglin	
2000	A Love Laughter Girl	爱笑的女孩	Wen Xingyu, Juhao	
2001	Matchmaker	红娘	Guo Da	
2002	Between the Neighbors	邻里之间	Guo Da, Niu Qun	
2003	All My Relatives	都是亲人	Guo Da, Li Wenqi, Liu Xiaomei	
2004	Wedding	婚礼	Ying Zhuang, Li Yong	
2005	The Romantic Thing	浪漫的事	Guo Da, Han Ying	
2006	The Biography of Sister Ma	马大姐外传	Guo Da	
2007	Gifts	送礼	Guo Da, Juhao	
2008	Dream Home	梦幻家园	Guo Da, Wang Ping	
2009	Welcome to Beijing	北京欢迎你	Guo Da	
2010	My Family Have A Graduate	家有毕业生	Guo Da	
2013	I Could Dance Whenever I Liked	想跳就跳	Pan Changjiang	
2014	Disturb the Residents	扰民	Hua Shao, Yue Yunpeng, Da Peng	

== Awards ==
Year	Award	N/W	Ref
2000	China Dazhong Television Award for Hottest Actresses	Won	
2007	1st Huading Award for Best Chinese Opera Actress	Won	
2008	2nd Huading Award for Best Actress	Nominated	
2009	10th China International Children's Festival - Child Star	Won	
2010	4th Huading Award for Hottest Actresses	Won	
