= The Passenger – Welcome to Germany =

1988 film

- Film poster
- Directed by: Thomas Brasch
- Written by: Thomas Brasch; Jurek Becker
- Produced by: George Reinhart; Joachim von Vietinghoff
- Starring: Tony Curtis
- Cinematography: Axel Block
- Edited by: Tanja Schmidbauer
- Release date: 5 May 1988
- Running time: 102 minutes
- Country: Germany
- Language: German

The Passenger – Welcome to Germany (German: Der Passagier – Welcome to Germany) is a 1988 German drama film directed by Thomas Brasch. It was entered into the 1988 Cannes Film Festival.

== Cast ==
- Tony Curtis – Mr. Cornfield
- Katharina Thalbach – Sofie
- Matthias Habich – Körner
- Karin Baal – Frau Tenzer
- Charles Régnier – Silbermann
- Alexandra Stewart – Mrs.
- George Tabori – Rabbiner
- Michael Morris – Donelly
- Ursula Andermatt – Rosa
- Guntbert Warns – Danner
- Fritz Marquardt – Herr Tenzer
- Birol Ünel – Baruch
- Gedeon Burkhard – Janko
