= 44th Berlin International Film Festival =

1994 film festival in Berlin, Germany

- Festival poster
- Location: Berlin, Germany
- Founded: 1951
- Awards: Golden Bear: In the Name of the Father
- No. of films: 300 films
- Festival date: 10–21 February 1994
- Website: Website

Berlin International Film Festival chronology
- 45th 43rd

The 44th annual Berlin International Film Festival was held from 10 to 21 February 1994. British producer Jeremy Thomas was the Jury President for the Main Competition.

The Golden Bear was awarded to In the Name of the Father, directed by Jim Sheridan.

The retrospective dedicated to Austrian director, actor and producer Erich von Stroheim was shown at the festival.

== Jury ==
=== Main Competition ===
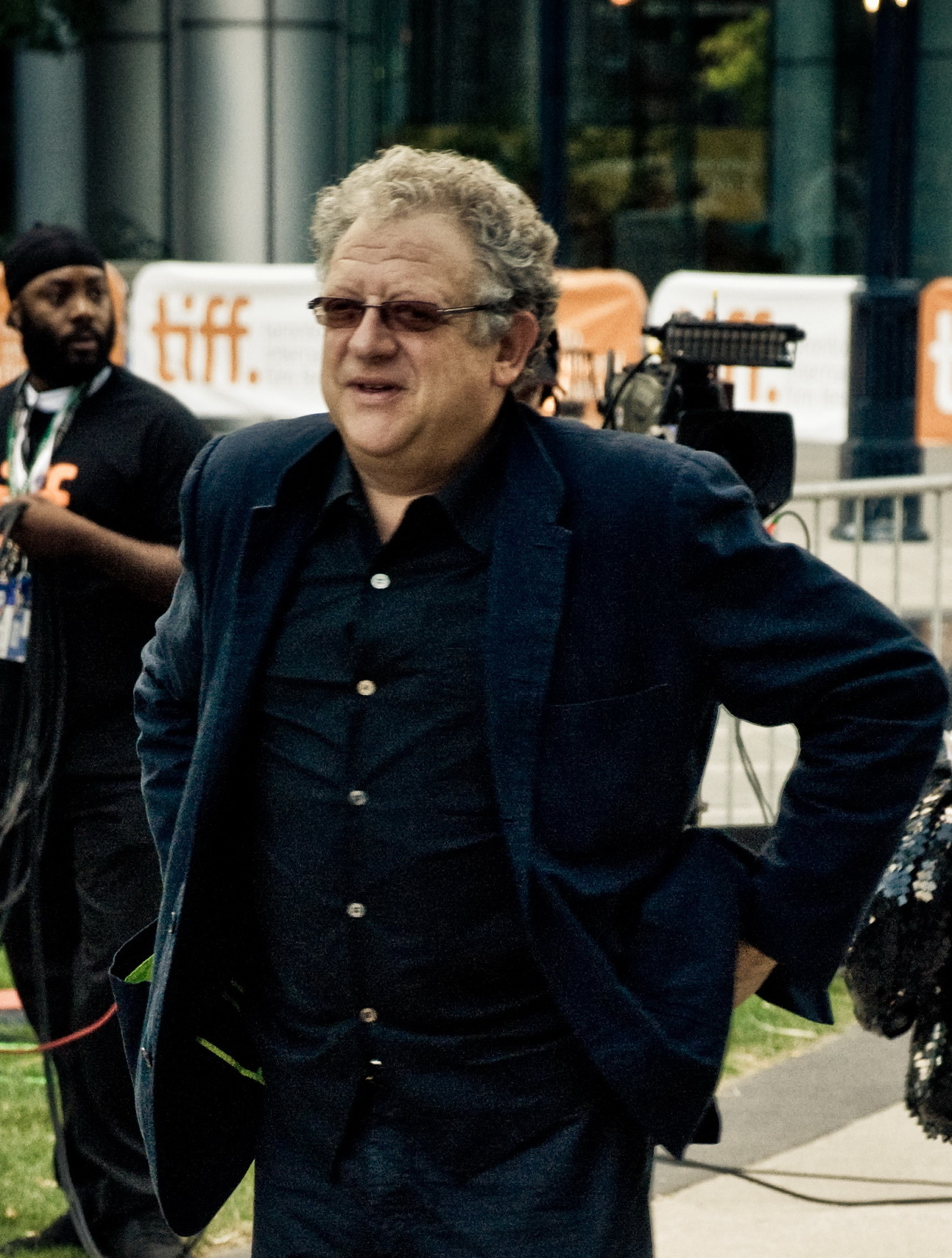
Jeremy Thomas, Jury President

The following people were announced as being on the jury for the festival:

- Jeremy Thomas, British producer - Jury President
- Chinghiz Aitmatov, Kyrgyz author
- María Luisa Bemberg, Argentine filmmaker
- Hsu Feng, Taiwanese actress and producer
- Morgan Freeman, American actor
- Francis Girod, French actor and filmmaker
- Corinna Harfouch, German actress
- Carlo Lizzani, Italian filmmaker
- Wolfram Schütte, German writer and film critic
- Susan Seidelman, American filmmaker
- Hayao Shibata, Japanese producer

== Official Sections ==
=== Main Competition ===
The following films were in competition for the Golden Bear and Silver Bear awards:

English title	Original title	Director(s)	Country
Back to Square One	Alles auf Anfang	Reinhard Münster	Germany
The Blue One	Der Blaue	Lienhard Wawrzyn	Germany
Charachar	চরাচর	Buddhadeb Dasgupta	India
Dear Goddamned Friends	Cari fottutissimi amici	Mario Monicelli	Italy
Exile		Paul Cox	Australia
Fearless		Peter Weir	United States
Foetus	A magzat	Márta Mészáros	Hungary, Poland
In the Name of the Father		Jim Sheridan	United Kingdom, Ireland
Ladybird, Ladybird		Ken Loach	United Kingdom
Law of Courage	Il giudice ragazzino	Alessandro Di Robilant	Italy
On the Far Side of the Tunnel	Al otro lado del túnel	Jaime de Armiñán	Spain
Passage to Buddha / Hwa-Om-Kyung	화엄경	Jang Sun-woo	South Korea
Philadelphia		Jonathan Demme	United States
Smoking/No Smoking		Alain Resnais	France
Something Fishy	Pas très catholique	Tonie Marshall	France
Sparkling Fox	火狐	Wu Ziniu	Hong Kong, China
Strawberry and Chocolate	Fresa y chocolate	Tomás Gutiérrez Alea, Juan Carlos Tabío	Cuba, Mexico, Spain
Three Colours: White	Trois couleurs: Blanc	Krzysztof Kieślowski	France, Poland, Switzerland
The Third Bank of the River	A Terceira Margem do Rio	Nelson Pereira dos Santos	Brazil
The Window Over the Way	Los de enfrente	Jesús Garay	France, Spain
The Year of the Dog	Год собаки	Semyon Aranovich	Russia

== Official Awards ==
=== Main Competition ===
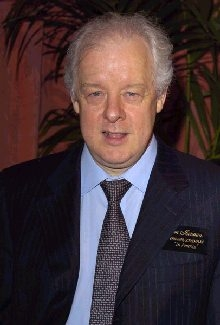
Jim Sheridan, winner of the Golden Bear at the festival

The following prizes were awarded by the Jury:

- Golden Bear: In the Name of the Father by Jim Sheridan
- Silver Bear – Special Jury Prize: Strawberry and Chocolate by Tomás Gutiérrez Alea, Juan Carlos Tabío
- Silver Bear for Best Director: Krzysztof Kieślowski for Three Colours: White
- Silver Bear for Best Actress: Crissy Rock for Ladybird, Ladybird
- Silver Bear for Best Actor: Tom Hanks for Philadelphia
- Silver Bear for an Outstanding Single Achievement: Smoking/No Smoking by Alain Resnais
- Silver Bear for an Outstanding Artistic Contribution: The Year of the Dog by Semyon Aranovich
- Alfred Bauer Prize: Hwa-Om-Kyung by Jang Sun-woo
- Honourable Mention:
  - Sparkling Fox by Wu Ziniu
  - Dear Goddamned Friends by Mario Monicelli
  - Fearless by Peter Weir

=== Blue Angel Award ===
- Law of Courage by Alessandro Di Robilant

=== Honorary Golden Bear ===
- Sophia Loren
