= The Ex-File 3: The Return of the Exes =

The Ex-File 3: The Return of the Exes （前任3:再见前任）
- Traditional Chinese: 前任3: 再見前任
- Simplified Chinese: 前任3: 再见前任
- Literal meaning: Ex-Partners Guide 3: Goodbye, Ex-Partners
- Hanyu Pinyin: qiánrèn 3: zàijiàn qiánrèn
- Directed by: Tian Yusheng
- Starring: Han Geng; Zheng Kai; Kelly Yu
- Production company: 华谊兄弟传媒股份有限公司 ，新圣堂文化传播有限公司
- Release date: December 29, 2017 (China)
- Running time: 120 minutes
- Country: China
- Language: Mandarin

The Ex-File 3: The Return of the Exes (Chinese: 前任3: 再见前任), also known as Ex-File 3, is a 2017 Chinese romantic comedy film directed by Tian Yusheng and is a sequel to the 2014 film Ex-Files and 2015 film Ex-Files 2.

== Cast ==
- Han Geng as 孟云 (Meng Yun)
- Zheng Kai as 余飞 (Yu Fei)
- Kelly Yu as 林佳 (Lin Jia)
- Zeng Meng Xue as 丁点 (Ding Dian)

== Release ==
It was released in China on 28 December 2018

== Box office ==
As of 26 January 2018, it has earned ¥1.9 billion in China.

The film gained some notoriety in the overseas press for beating Star Wars: The Last Jedi at the Chinese box office.

== Awards and nominations ==
Year	Award	Category	Recipients	Result	Ref.
2018	9th China Film Director's Guild Awards	Best Film	The Ex-File 3	Nominated	
2018	9th China Film Director's Guild Awards	Best Director	Tian Yusheng	Nominated	
2018	9th China Film Director's Guild Awards	Best Young Director	Tian Yusheng	Nominated	
2018	9th China Film Director's Guild Awards	Best Screenwriter	Tian Yusheng, Chang Jia, Hu Jiahao, Ma Jingqi	Nominated	
2018	23rd Huading Awards	Best Newcomer	Kelly Yu	Nominated	
2018	23rd Huading Awards	Best Original Film Song	"Ti Mian (体面)" (Kelly Yu)	Won	

== See also ==
- Ex-Files
- Ex-Files 2
