= Yao Xingtong =

Chinese actress (born 1983)

- 姚星彤
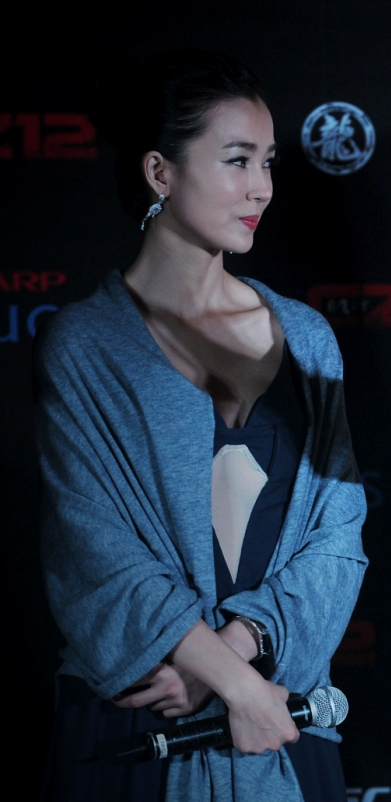
- Yao in 2012
- Born: Yao Xinqian (姚馨茜); Yao Lan (姚岚); April 12, 1983 (age 43); Nangang District, Harbin, Heilongjiang, China
- Other names: Helen Yao; Anna Yao
- Education: Beijing Film Academy
- Occupation: Actress
- Years active: 2008–present
- Agents: Huayi Brothers; Untitled Entertainment

Yao Xingtong (Chinese: 姚星彤; pinyin: Yáo Xīngtóng; born 12 April 1983) is a Chinese actress. She is also known as Helen Yao and Anna Yao. She is fluent in French and English.

She is noted for her roles as Ma Liruo and Coco in the film Life of Sentime (2010) and CZ12 (2012).

== Early life ==
Yao was born and raised in Nangang District of Harbin, Heilongjiang. She graduated from Beijing Film Academy, where she majored in acting.

== Career ==
Yao has been a supporting actor in several television series, including Together with You, Police Story, War and Destiny, and Records of Kangxi's Travel Incognito 5.

Her first film role was uncredited appearance in the film Growth (2006). After other minor roles in films and television series, she received her first leading role in a film called Blossom, for which she received Golden Rooster Award nominations for Best Actress.

In 2009, she starred in the romantic comedy film Life of Sentime, alongside Ming Dow and Xia Yu, which earned her a Best Newcomer Award at the Macau International Movie Festival.

Yao gained international fame for her starring role as Coco in CZ12 (2012), a Hong Kong-Chinese action film co-produced, written, directed by, and starring Jackie Chan.

In 2014, Yao had the lead role in Ex-Files, a romantic comedy film co-starring Han Geng.

== Filmography ==
=== Film ===
| Year | English title | Chinese title | Role | Notes |
|---|---|---|---|---|
| 2006 | Grow Up | 成长 | | |
| 2008 | Love Fairy Tale | 爱情童话 | | |
| 2008 | Blossom | 绽放 | Yue Ming | |
| 2009 | Contract About Interchange Status | 变身契约 | Mao Lala | |
| 2010 | Life of Sentime | 感情生活 | Ma Liruo | |
| 2012 | CZ12 | 十二生肖 | Coco | |
| 2014 | Ex-Files | 前任攻略 | Xia Lu | |
| 2014 | Fiji Love | 斐济99°C爱情 | Lin Ke | |
| 2015 | Love Without Distance | 土豪520 | Zhao Xiaowei | |
| 2015 | Who Am I 2015 | 我是谁2015 | Tong Xin | |
| 2015 | Love in the Office | 一路向前 | Yao Yao | |
| 2016 | Movie Master of Pretending | 假装看不见之电影大师 | Zhang Fanfu | |
| 2018 | Ice Cream Lover | 冷恋时代 | Ling Yue | |
| 2019 | Viy 2: Journey to China | 中国游记 | Cheng Lan | |
| 2019 | Back to Yesterday | 回到昨天 | | |
| 2019 | Space Intellectual | 太空2049 | | |

=== Television series ===
| Year | English title | Chinese title | Role | Notes |
|---|---|---|---|---|
| 2004 | Together with You | 和你在一起 | Zi Yi | |
| 2004 | Police Story | 刑警故事 | | Cameo |
| 2005 | Unusual Path | 非常道 | Chen Xiaoyu | |
| 2005 | The Sea's Promise | 海的誓言 | Lu Yajie | |
| 2007 | War and Destiny | 庚子风云 | Princess | |
| 2007 | Records of Kangxi's Travel Incognito 5 | 康熙微服私访记5 | Qian Xiangya | |
| 2007 | Tomb Path | 墓道 | | Cameo |
| 2008 | Crash | 撞车 | Liu Ying | |
| 2008 | Vagabond Vigilante | 游剑江湖 | | Cameo |
| 2010 | I Want a Family | 我要一个家 | Meng Xiaoyu | |
| 2018 | Twenties Once Again | 重返二十岁 | Jiang Xue | |
| TBA | Peace in Palace, Peace in Chang'an | 天下长安 | Li Mulan | |

== Awards and nominations ==
| Year | Nominated | Award | Category | Result | Ref. |
|---|---|---|---|---|---|
| 2009 | Blossom | 27th Golden Rooster Awards | Best Actress | Nominated | |
| 2009 | Life of Sentime | 1st Macau International Movie Festival | Best Newcomer | Won | |
| 2014 | CZ12 | 32nd Hundred Flowers Awards | Best Actress | Nominated | |
| 2015 | CZ12 | Korean Association of Film Critics Awards | Most Popular Actress (Mainland China) | Won | |
