= The Amazing Race 2 (Chinese season) =

Season of television series

- Season 2
- Presented by: Allan Wu
- No. of teams: 8
- Winners: Han Geng & Wu Xin
- No. of legs: 10
- Distance traveled: 39,600 km (24,600 mi)
- No. of episodes: 10

Release
- Original network: Shenzhen TV
- Original release: July 10 – September 25, 2015

Additional information
- Filming dates: June 2 – August 16, 2015

Series chronology
- ← Previous; Season 1 Next → Season 3

The Amazing Race 2 (Chinese: 极速前进第二季) is the second season of the Chinese reality competition show The Amazing Race (Chinese: 极速前进; pinyin: Jísù Qiánjìn). Loosely based on the American reality TV series The Amazing Race, it initially featured six teams of two in a race around the world. Singapore based Chinese-American actor Allan Wu, who was also the host of The Amazing Race Asia and The Amazing Race: China Rush and episodes 3 to 10 of the first season returned for this season. This season visited four continents and eight countries and traveled over 39,600 kilometres (24,600 mi) during ten legs. Starting in Sydney, racers traveled through Australia, Turkey, Spain, France, Namibia, Mauritius, and Thailand before finishing in Chengdu with intermittent returns to China throughout the season. New twists introduced in this season include Invasion and Cumulative Intersection-Versus Leg. This season premiered on Shenzhen TV on July 10, 2015 and concluded on September 25, 2015.

Friends Han Geng and Wu Xin were the winners of this season, while married couple Yang Qianhua and Ding Zigao finished second, and Xiao Yang and Wang Taili finished third.

== Production ==
=== Development and filming ===
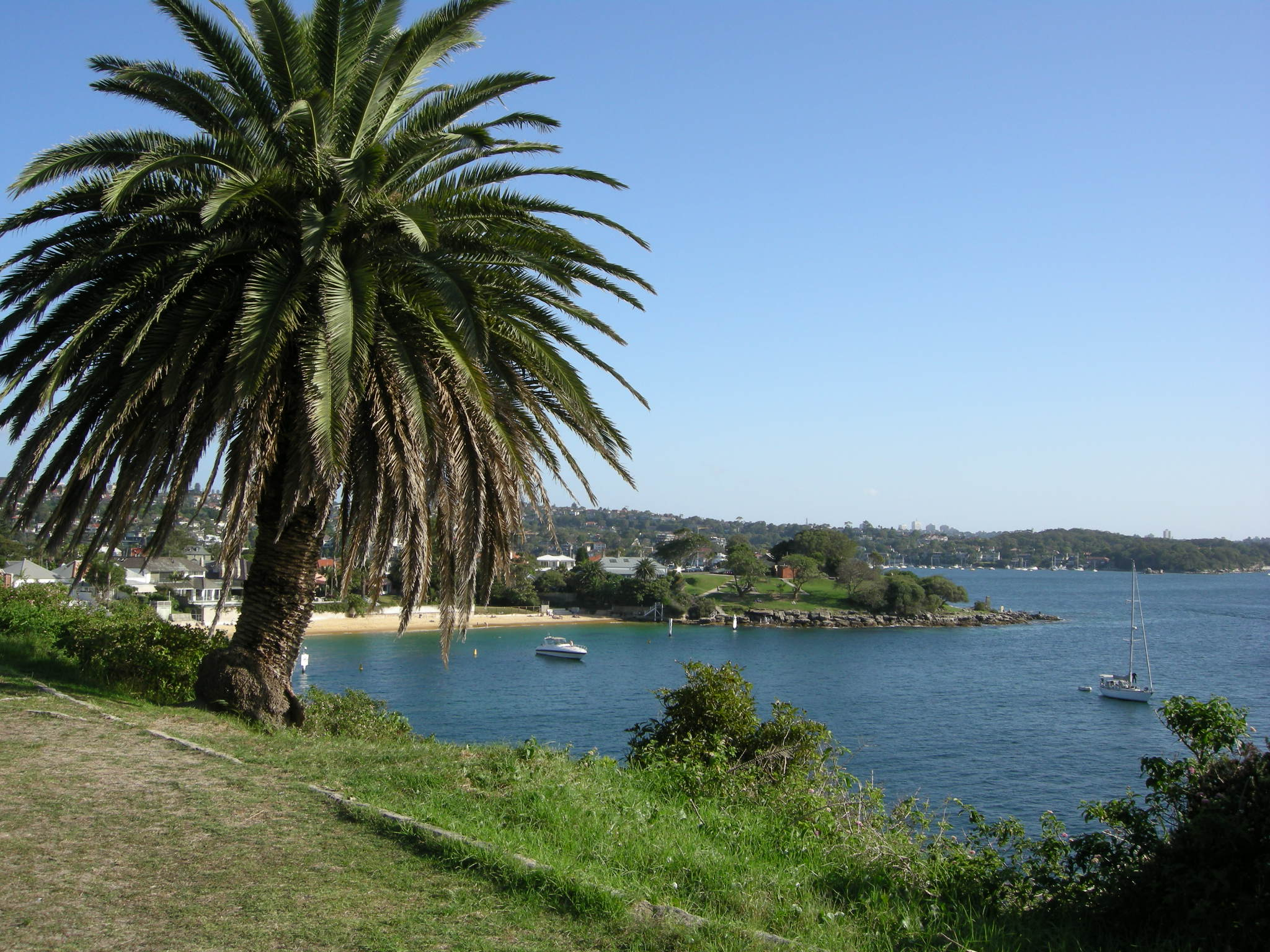
The Starting Line of the second Amazing Race was at Watsons Bay in Sydney, Australia.

Filming began June 2, 2015 at Sydney and ended on August 16, 2015 at Chengdu, Sichuan. Unlike the American version and most other versions that always start and end in the same country, this was the first season where both the Starting Line and Finish Line were held in different nations, and also the first season overall in the entire franchise the Starting Line was not held in the show's home country.

This season introduced two new twists. Invasion was a new twist that allowed several teams to join in the game as intruders. The intruders entered at the start of a given leg. In their Invasion leg, the intruders had to finish in a given position (top two in Leg 7, or first Leg 9) in order to continue racing. If they failed their invasion, they would be eliminated as if they had finished last. If they succeeded, the intruders would keep on racing in future legs.

This season also introduced the Cumulative Intersection-Versus Leg, which was a combination of Intersection and Versus for some tasks. At the start of the leg, the four remaining teams had to choose which team they want to be Intersected by voting. Once two teams chose each other at the same time, they would be Intersected. Then, the pairs of teams would complete in either a head-to-head or a timed task. The team that won the task would earn two points. After five rounds, the teams with the most points would automatically finish in first place. The second pair would compete in a final task, and the winning team would keep racing while the losing team was eliminated.

=== Marketing ===
The show was sponsored by Infiniti, Sohu, Pepsi and RRS.com. Eastroc Super Drink returned to sponsor, and teams could still pick up their drinks as energy supplements during the legs.

== Cast ==
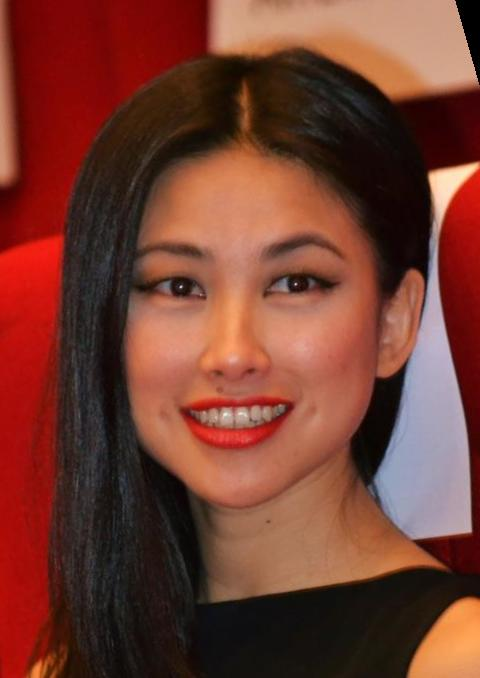
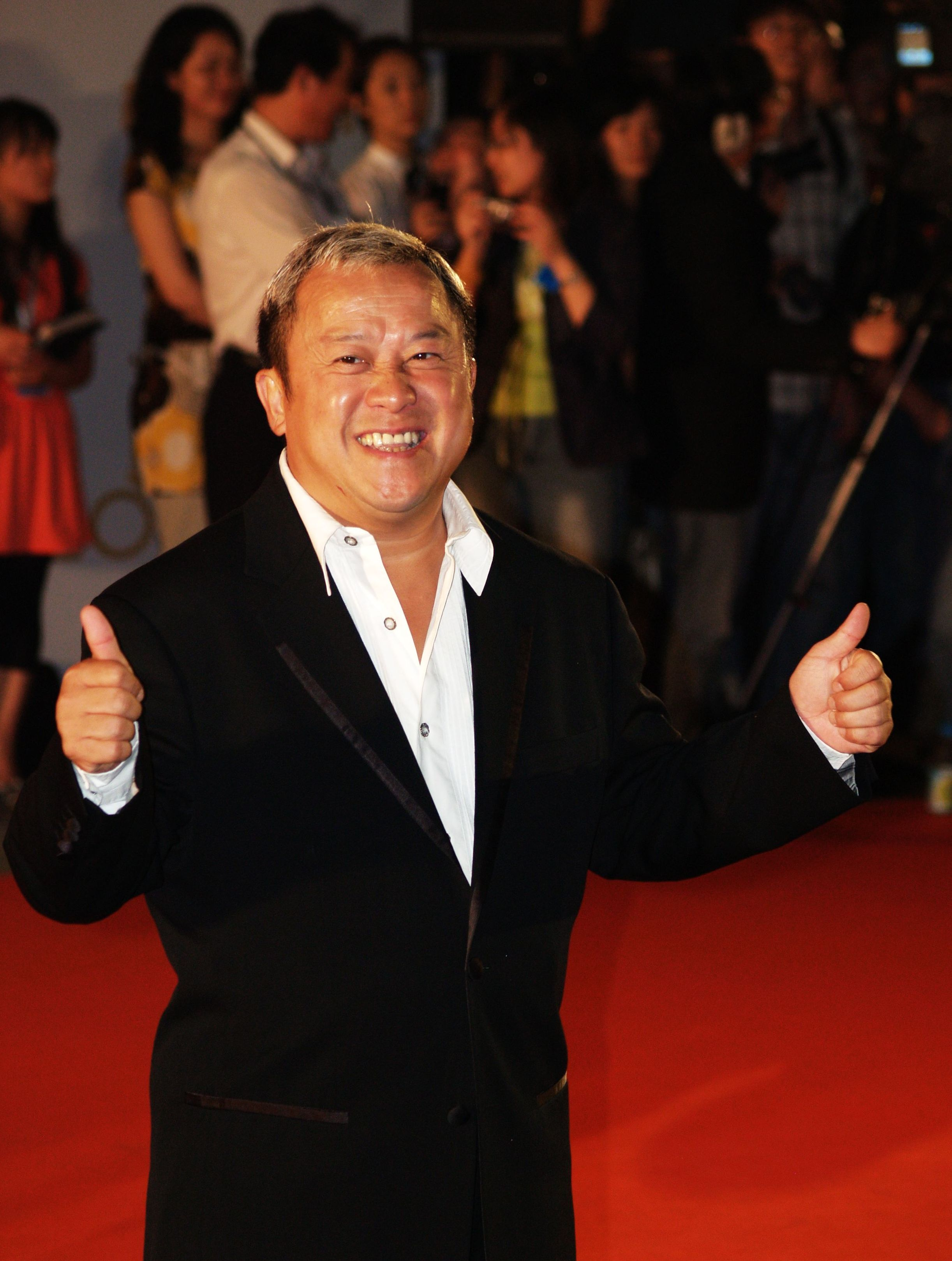
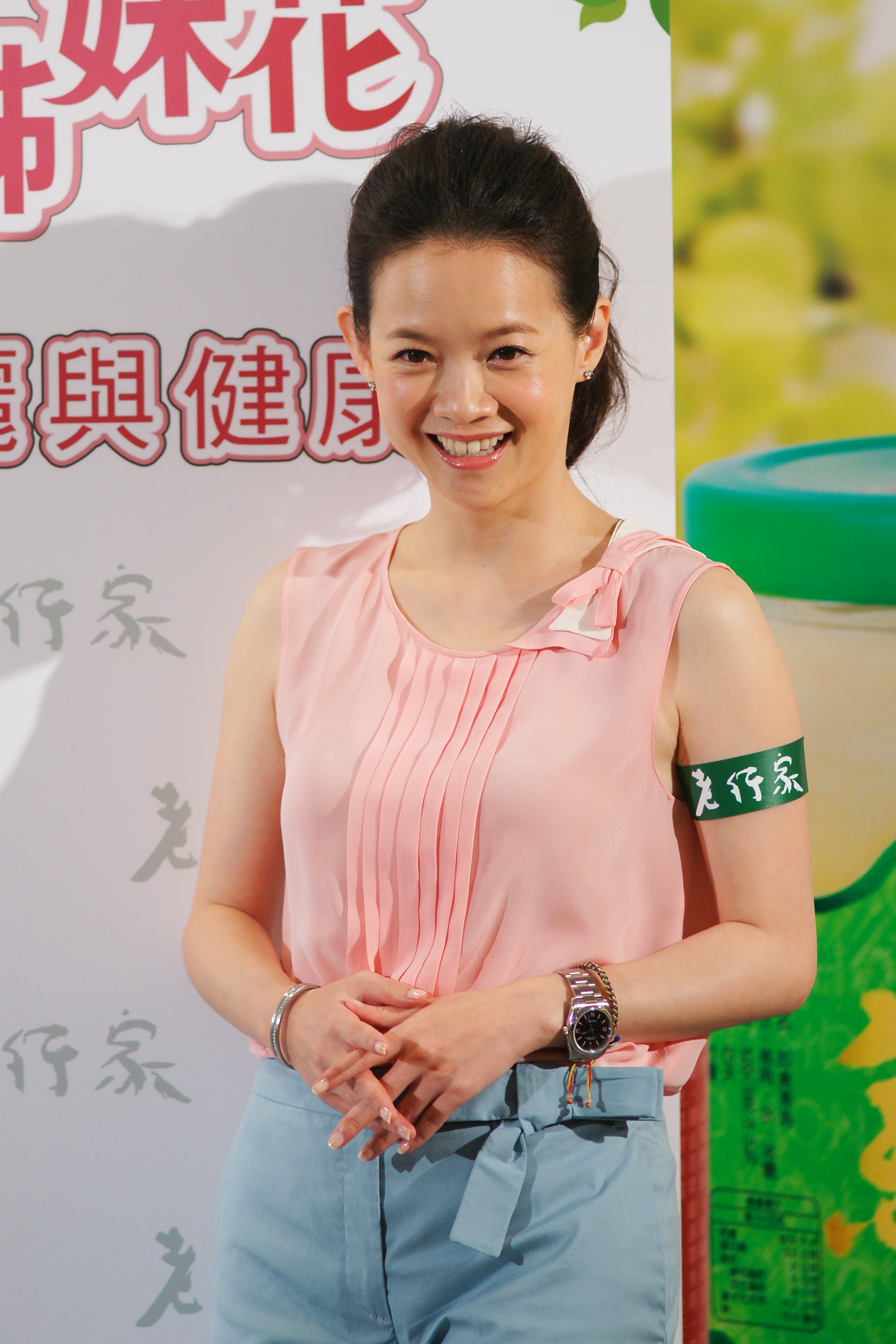
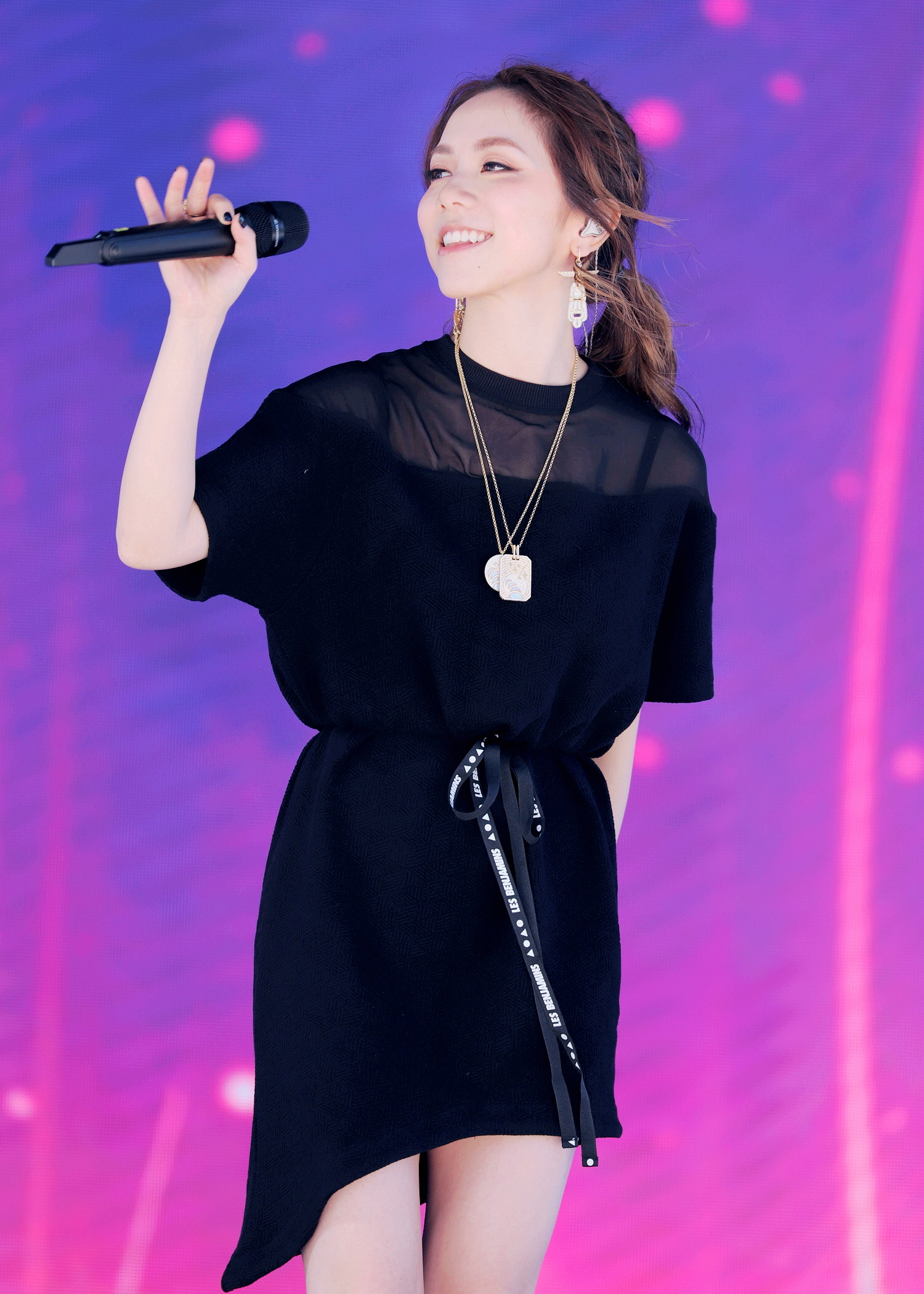
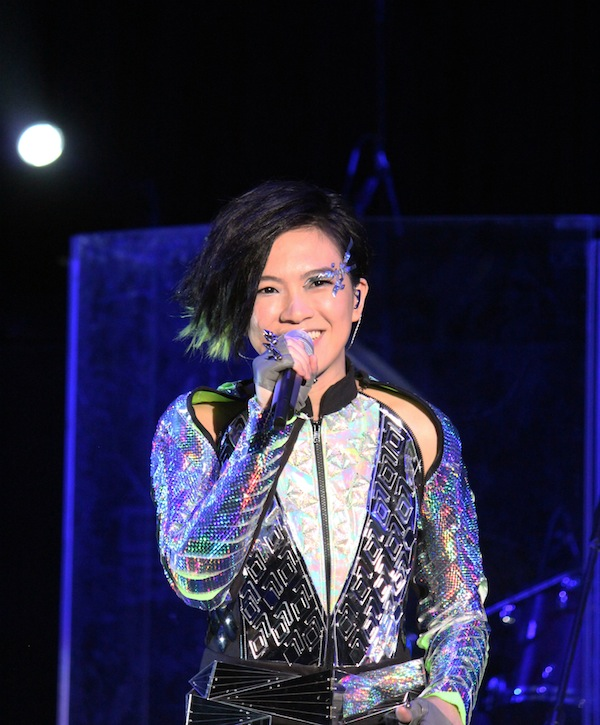
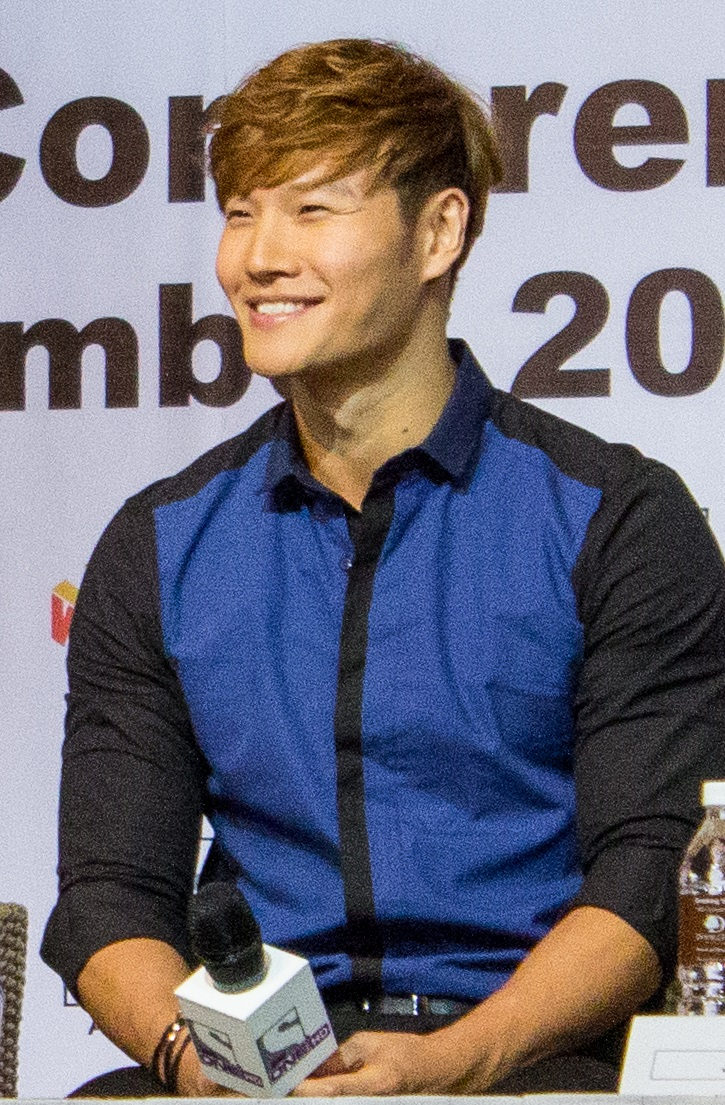
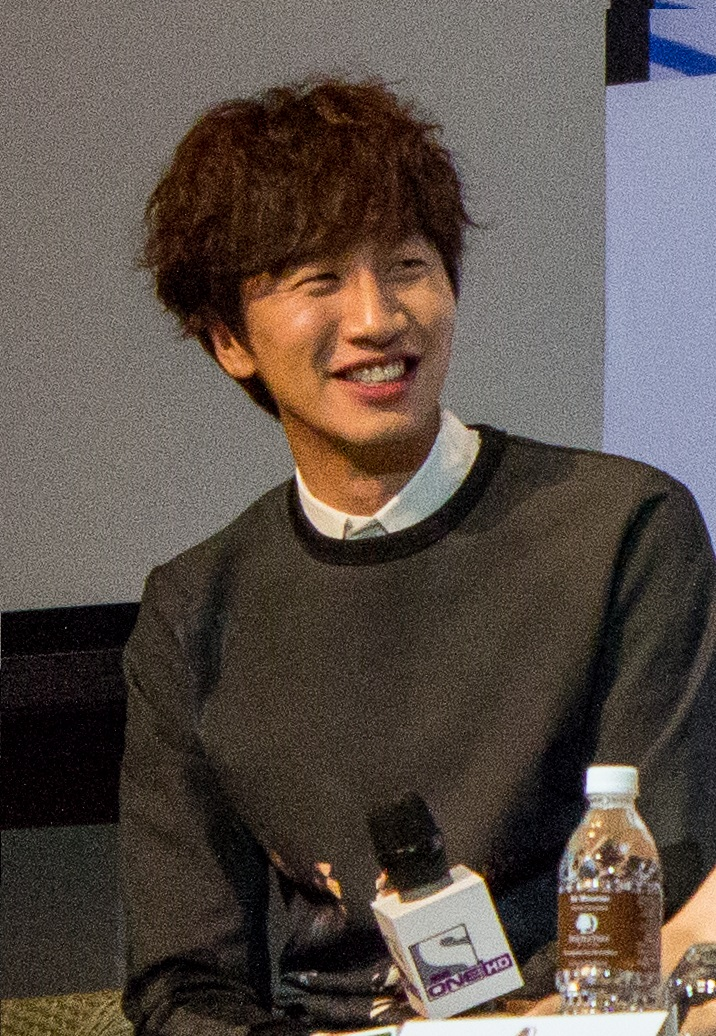
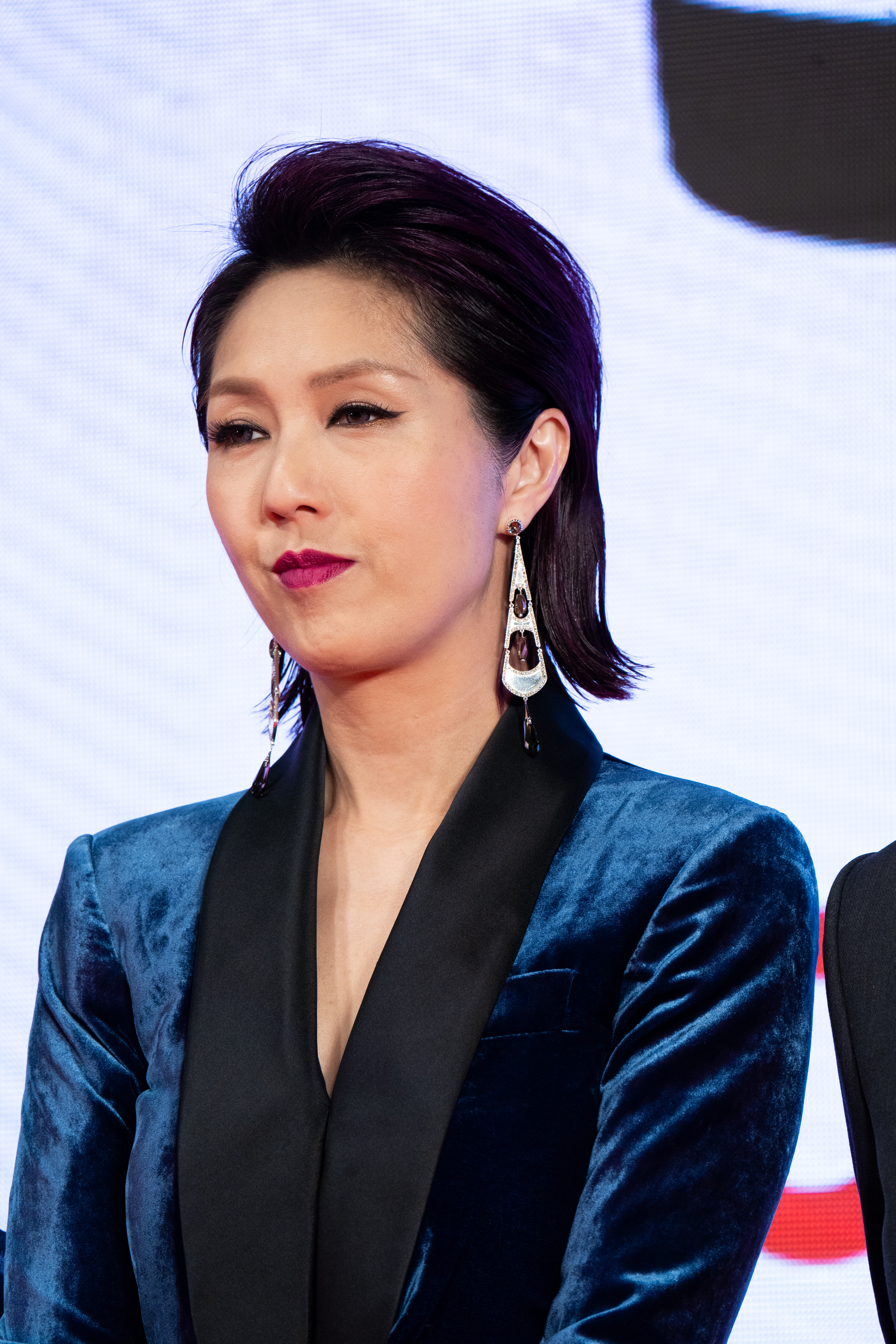
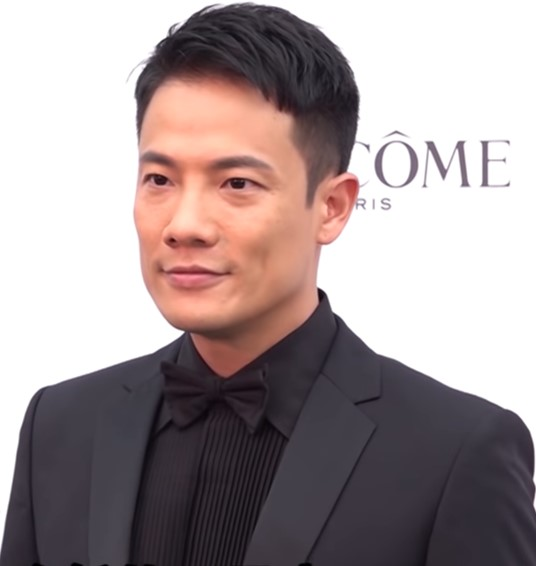
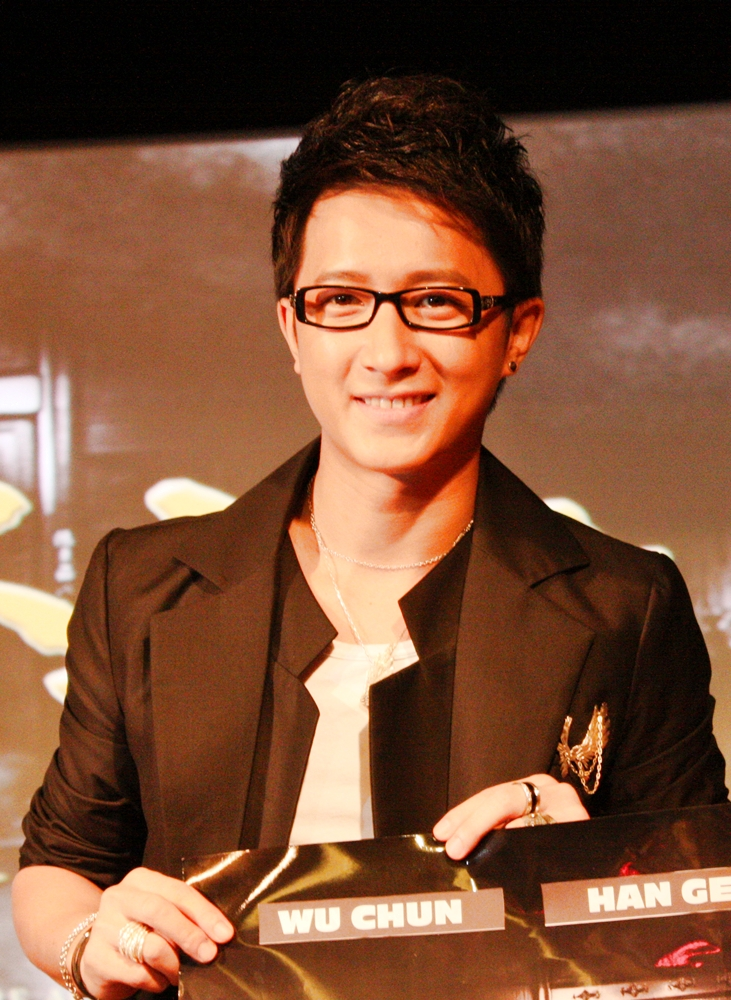
From left to right: Zhu Zhu, Zeng Zhiwei, Zeng Baoyi, Deng Ziqi, Zhang Yunjing, Kim Jong-kook, Lee Kwang-soo, Yang Qianhua, Ding Zigao, and Han Geng

Similar to the first season, this season featured celebrities who were chosen to race on the show. Notable casting members including singers Deng Ziqi and Super Idol winner Zhang Yunjing, the Chopstick Brothers notable for the viral video "Little Apple", as well as the 2012 Summer Olympics gymnast Feng Zhe.

Contestants	Age	Relationship	Notability	Status
Feng Zhe (冯喆)	27	Dating	Olympic gymnast	Eliminated 1st (in Cairns, Australia)
Zhu Zhu (朱珠)	30	Dating	Actress / Singer / VJ	Eliminated 1st (in Cairns, Australia)
Zeng Zhiwei (曾志伟)	62	Father & Daughter	Actor / Director / Producer	Eliminated 2nd (in Uçhisar, Turkey)
Zeng Baoyi (曾宝仪)	42	Father & Daughter	Actress / Singer / TV host	Eliminated 2nd (in Uçhisar, Turkey)
Deng Ziqi (邓紫棋)	23	Friends	Singer / Songwriter	Eliminated 3rd (in Cabrières-d'Avignon, France)
Zhang Yunjing (张芸京)	31	Friends	Singer	Eliminated 3rd (in Cabrières-d'Avignon, France)
Yuan Zihui (原子鏸)	37	Siblings	Actress	Eliminated 4th (in Savanne District, Mauritius)
Yuan Heyu (原和玉)	30	Siblings	—N/a	Eliminated 4th (in Savanne District, Mauritius)
Kim Jong-kook (金鐘國)	39	Friends	Musician / Entertainer	Eliminated 5th (in Nonthaburi, Thailand)
Lee Kwang-soo (李光洙)	30	Friends	Actor / Model	Eliminated 5th (in Nonthaburi, Thailand)
Xiao Yang (肖央)	35	Partners	Viral video stars	Third Place
Wang Taili (王太利)	46	Partners	Viral video stars	Third Place
Yang Qianhua (杨千嬅)	41	Married	Singer / Actress	Second Place
Ding Zigao (丁子高)	35	Married	Entrepreneur	Second Place
Han Geng (韩庚)	31	Friends	Mandopop singer / Actor	Winners
Wu Xin (吴昕)	32	Friends	Actress / TV host	Winners

=== Future appearances ===
Zhu Zhu competed on Race the World in 2016, with Yuan Heyu appearing as a replacement contestant for two episodes.

== Results ==
The following teams participated in the season, each listed along with their placements in each leg and relationships as identified by the program. Note that this table is not necessarily reflective of all content broadcast on television, owing to the inclusion or exclusion of some data. Placements are listed in finishing order:

Team	Position (by leg)										Roadblocks performed
Team	1	2	3	4+	5+	6	7∂	8	9∂	10	Roadblocks performed
Han Geng & Wu Xin	2nd	4th	2nd^{4}	2nd	1st⊃	1st	2nd	1stθ	4th^{9}	1st	Han Geng 6, Wu Xin 1
Yang Qianhua & Ding Zigao	1st	2nd⊃	1st	3rdε^{5}	2nd⊂	3rd^{7}	4th	1stθ	3rd	2nd	Yang Qianhua 1, Ding Zigao 6
Xiao Yang & Wang Taili	5th	5th⊃^{3}	4th^{4}	4th−	3rd	2nd	3rd	3rd^	1st	3rd	Xiao Yang 6^{3}, Wang Taili 1
Kim Jong-kook & Lee Kwang-soo									2nd∇^{8}		Kim Jong-kook 0, Lee Kwang-soo 1
Yuan Zihui & Yuan Heyu							1st √	4th^			Yuan Zihui 0, Yuan Heyu 0
Deng Ziqi & Zhang Yunjing	6th^{2}	3rd	5th	1st	4th−	4th					Deng Ziqi 3, Zhang Yunjing 2
Zeng Zhiwei & Zeng Baoyi	4th^{1}	1st⊃	3rd	5thə^{6}							Zeng Zhiwei 2^{1}, Zeng Baoyi 1
Feng Zhe & Zhu Zhu	3rd	6th⊂									Feng Zhe 1, Zhu Zhu 1

Key

- A red team placement means the team was eliminated.
- A green ƒ indicates that the team won a Fast Forward.
- A purple ε indicates that the team decided to use the first Express Pass on that leg. A magenta ə indicates the team had previously been given the second Express Pass and used it on that leg.
- An underlined blue team's placement indicates that the team came in last on a non-elimination leg and had to perform a Speed Bump during the next leg.
- An underlined cyan team's placement indicates that the team came in last on a non-elimination leg and had some penalties during their mandatory rest period after the leg (Each penalty see below.).
- An underlined leg number indicates that there was mandatory rest period but was not in the hotel, teams must find their rest place given by the host. While the last team to check-in had to sleep inside the convenient store as the penalty of last. The first place team was still awarded a prize for that leg.
- A brown ⊃ indicates that the team chose to or successfully voted to U-Turn another team; ⊂ indicates the team who received it.
- An orange + indicates that there was a Versus on this leg, while an orange − indicates who lost the Versus and was given a 15-minute penalty.
- Matching colored symbols (black θ and red ^) indicate teams who worked together during part of the leg as a result of the Cumulative Intersection-Versus Leg and the team represented color.
- A pink ∂ indicates that the leg introduced intruders; green √ means the intruders succeed while red ∇ means they failed.

Notes

1. Zeng Zhiwei chose to forfeit the Roadblock at Leg 1 and he & Zeng Baoyi were issued a 1-hour penalty at the Roadblock site.
2. Deng Ziqi & Zhang Yunjing elected to quit the Detour challenge and were issued a 1-hour penalty at the Pit Stop.
3. Xiao Yang chose to forfeit the Roadblock at Leg 3 and he & Wang Taili were issued a 1-hour penalty at the Roadblock site.
4. Han Geng & Wu Xin and Xiao Yang & Wang Taili were each issued 15-minute penalties before starting the Detour because they both received money from locals earlier in the leg, which was prohibited per the rules for Leg 3.
5. Yang Qianhua & Ding Zigao used their Express Pass to bypass the Detour on Leg 4.
6. Zeng Zhiwei & Zeng Baoyi were subject to various placement changes on Leg 4:
  - They were forced to quit the Versus because of an injury Zeng Zhiwei sustained during the task. They were issued a 15-minute penalty which started after the last team of the Versus had served their 15-minute penalty.
  - They used the Express Pass given to them by Yang Qianhua & Ding Zigao to bypass the underground city task on Leg 4.
  - They initially arrived at the Pit Stop 2nd, but were issued a 1-hour penalty for not completing the last task on Leg 3 after checking in which involved finding a local's house and spending the night there. All other teams trailing them checked-in during their penalty time, dropping Zeng Zhiwei & Zeng Baoyi to last place and resulting in their elimination.
7. Yang Qianhua & Ding Zigao chose to quit the Detour challenge and they were issued a 1-hour penalty before they could continue racing.
8. Due to modification to the "Intruders" rule on Leg 9, Kim Jong-kook & Lee Kwang-soo were required to win this leg (finish 1st) in order to continue racing. They placed 2nd in this leg, resulting in their elimination. The placement at the end of the leg did not affect the other two teams (Yang Qianhua & Ding Zigao and Han Geng & Wu Xin).
9. Han Geng & Wu Xin were issued a time penalty as they had failed to deliver a chicken to Allan. They arrived at the Pit Stop last, but they were not issued a penalty. They were also notified that Jin Zhongguo & Li Guangzhu failed their Invaders mission (see note 8), and they were safe from elimination.

=== Voting history ===
Similar to the Israeli, Australian and Philippine versions, teams on the second leg voted for who should receive the U-Turn. The team with the most votes had to complete the other Detour option they did not select.

Leg #:	2
U-Turned:	Feng Zhe & Zhu Zhu; 3–2–1
Voter	Team's vote
Yang Qianhua & Ding Zigao	Feng Zhe & Zhu Zhu
Xiao Yang & Wang Taili	Feng Zhe & Zhu Zhu
Zeng Zhiwei & Zeng Baoyi	Feng Zhe & Zhu Zhu
Feng Zhe & Zhu Zhu	Yang Qianhua & Ding Zigao
Han Geng & Wu Xin	Yang Qianhua & Ding Zigao
Deng Ziqi & Zhang Yunjing	Xiao Yang & Wang Taili

== Prizes ==
The prize for each leg is awarded to the first place team for that leg. In most legs (except Leg 5 and 8), the winners of the leg were also given Infiniti Fund of CN¥500,000 to donate to their charity of choice. Additional prizes were awarded as follows:

- Leg 1 – Two Express Passes^{1}, an intelligent water filter and travel vouchers worth CN¥50,000 both sponsored by RRS Electronics.
- Leg 2 – The ability to choose between two Infiniti vehicle models to use for the next leg and an immediate exclusive helicopter tour around the Great Barrier Reef.
- Leg 3 – An intelligent water filter and travel vouchers worth CN¥50,000 both sponsored by RRS Electronics.
- Leg 4 – A CN¥5,000 to donate for charity.
- Leg 5 – Chando facial treatment package.
- Leg 6 – Diamond necklaces worth CN¥50,000 each, and the ability to choose between two Infiniti vehicle models to use for the next leg.
- Leg 7 – Free flight upgrade to premium-class.
- Leg 8 – Diamond necklaces worth CN¥50,000 each^{2}
- Leg 9 – An intelligent water filter and travel vouchers worth CN¥50,000 both sponsored by RRS Electronics, and the ability to choose between two Infiniti vehicle models to use for the next leg.
- Leg 10 – An Infiniti Q50L and QX50 for each racer, and two trophies.
1. An item that can be used to skip any one task of the team's choosing. The winning team keeps one for themselves but must relinquish the second to another team before the end of the sixth leg.
2. Two teams arrived in first place, due to the Cumulative Intersection-Versus Leg (see below). However, both teams (Han Geng & Wu Xin and Yang Qianhua & Ding Zigao) were each given the same prizes.

== Race summary ==
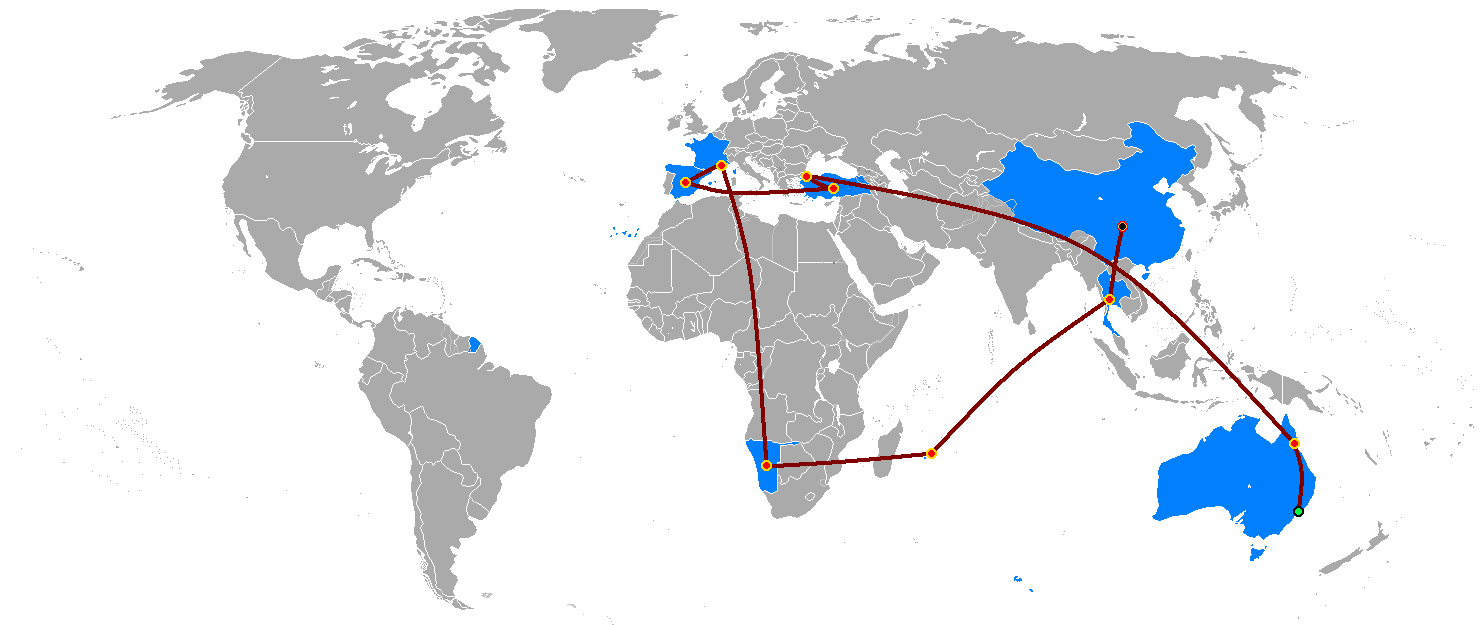
The route map of The Amazing Race 2.

Destinations	Air travel Rail travel Water travel Bus travel Helicopter travel Bicycle travel Gondola travel
Route Markers	绕道 (Detour) 路障 (Roadblock) 对抗 (Versus) 联合 (Intersection) 回转 (U-Turn) 减速带 (Speed Bump) 中继站 (Pit Stop)

=== Leg 1 (Australia) ===
At the Sydney Opera House, teams took part in square dancing.

Airdate: July 10, 2015

- Sydney, Australia (Watsons Bay) (Starting Line)
- Sydney (Centennial Parklands)
- Sydney (City Centre – Farm Cove)
- Sydney (Sydney Opera House – North Square)
- Sydney (City Centre – Hyde Park)

This season's first Detour was a choice between 滑溜溜 (Huáliuliū – Slippery) or 软棉棉 (Ruǎnmiánmián – Soft). In Slippery, one team member had to put on a helmet, a wetsuit, and watermelon shoes and then surf along a slippery 40-metre (130 ft) track while being pulled on a rope by a rugby player and their partner, much like the during the Chinchilla Melon Festival, without falling to receive their next clue. In Soft, teams had to catch three sheep and calm each sheep for at least three seconds by placing a cowboy hat over their eyes to receive the next clue.

In this season's first Roadblock, one team member had to don a diving suit and enter a shark cage. Once the cage was submerged, they had to unravel five ropes in the cage to retrieve the key that opened the cage to receive their next clue from the diver.

Additional tasks

- At Watsons Bay, teams had to grab a flag, then pull an inflatable rescue boat ashore that would take them to the Søren Larsen, which they had to search for their first clue.
- At the North Square of the Sydney Opera House, teams had to assemble seven tourists from a crowd to perform a square dance to the song "Little Apple" to receive their next clue.

=== Leg 2 (Australia) ===
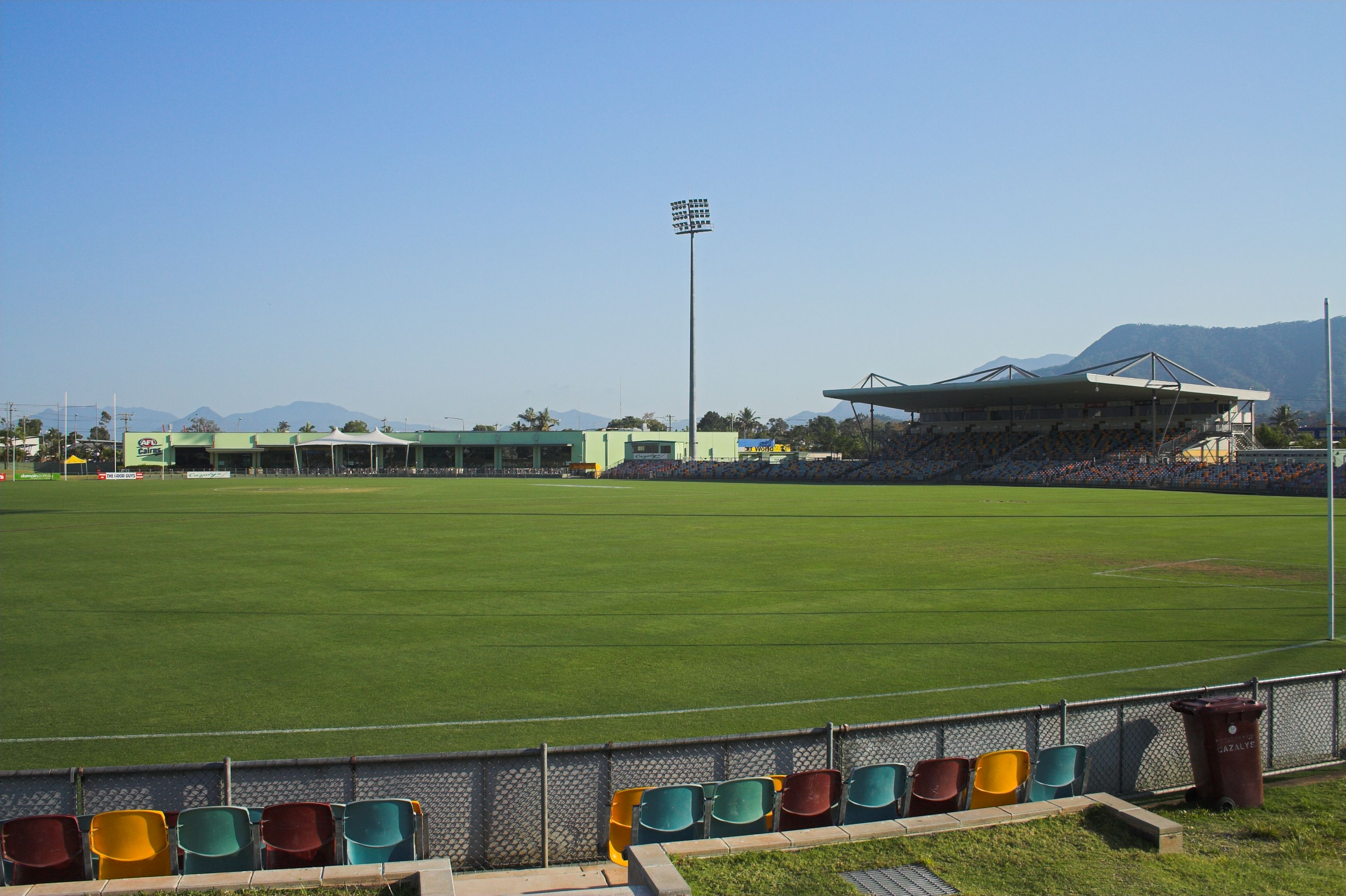
Teams ended the second leg at Cazaly's Stadium in Cairns.

Airdate: July 17, 2015

- Sydney (Sydney Airport) to Cairns (Cairns Airport)
- Kuranda (Rainforestation Nature Park)
- Cairns (AJ Hackett Cairns Bungy)
  - Cairns (Cairns Zoom)
- Cairns (Cazaly's Stadium)

This leg's Detour was a choice between 烤魚 (Kǎoyú – Fish) or 長矛 (Chángmáo – Lance). In Fish, teams had to get flint from the locals and start a fire to cook a fish to receive their next clue from the Tribe Master. In Lance, teams had to take turns to throw 10 lances into the target boards, five for each team. The board nearest to the teams was worth one point, the furthest are worth six point, and the target between these two worth three points. Once teams scored six points, they would receive their next clue. If teams used up all their lances, they would serve a three-minute penalty before they could continue with the task, but the points earned would not reset.

In this leg's Roadblock, teams made their way to AJ Hackett Cairns Bungy and drew lots to determine which jump style the chosen team member had to perform to receive their next clue. The Double Bungee Jump required both team members to jump together. The Superman Jump required the team member to jump while wearing a Superman suit.

For their Speed Bump, Deng Ziqi & Zhang Yunjing had to step on to a slackline and ride a zip line across a saltwater crocodile enclosure with raw chickens attached to both team members' feet before they could continue driving to the Pit Stop.

Additional tasks

- At the Pit Stop hotel in Cairns, teams had to vote for the team they wished to U-Turn.
- At Rainforestation Nature Park, one team member had to dip their heads in one of six animal cages filled with either mice, grasshoppers, lizards, butterflies, rotten fish or spiders and retrieve their next clue using only their mouths.
- After completing the Detour, teams had to make their way back to the starting point. Along the way, teams had to perform a kangaroo dance while having to notice various kangaroo patterns. If teams performed the dance properly and gave the correct number of patterns (27), they would receive their next clue.
- After completing the Roadblock, teams had to watch a video inside an Infiniti QX70, which instructed them to drive to Cazaly's Stadium, their Pit Stop for this leg.

=== Leg 3 (Australia → Turkey) ===
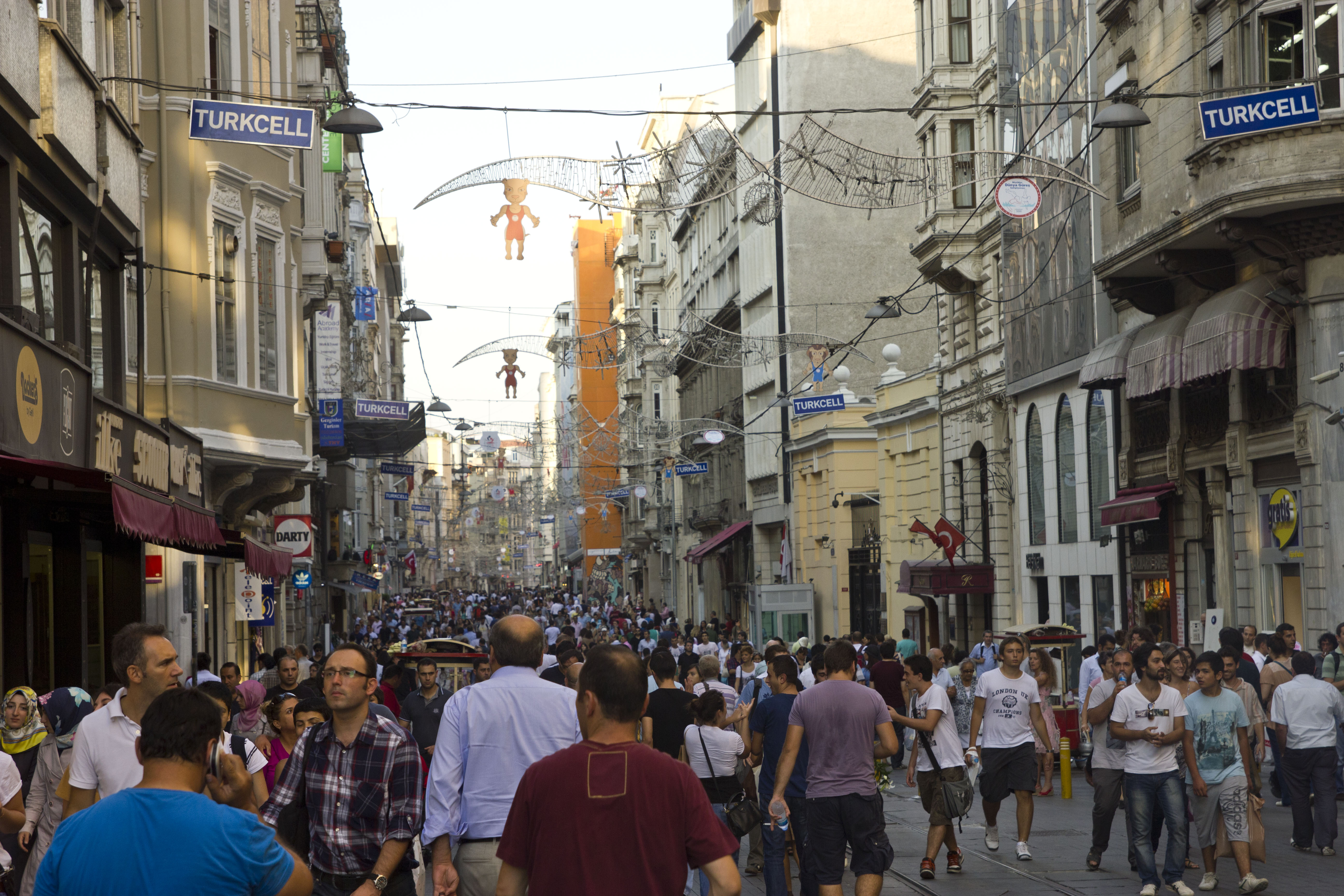
Teams visited the streets of İstiklal Avenue for the Detour.

Airdate: July 24, 2015

- Cairns (Cairns Airport) to Istanbul, Turkey (Istanbul Atatürk Airport) via China
- Istanbul (Sura Hagia Sophia Hotel) (Pit Start)
- Istanbul (Ayasofya Hürrem Sultan Hamamı)
- Istanbul (Galata Tower)
- Istanbul (İstiklal Avenue)
- Istanbul (Rumelihisarı)
- Istanbul (Hasanpaşa Bakery)
- Istanbul (Ortaköy Plaza)

This leg's Detour was a choice between 手艺 (Shǒuyì – Crafts) or 才艺 (Cáiyì – Arts). In Crafts, teams had to polish leather shoes, with each pair of shoes polished for 4 Turkish lira, until they earned ₺40 to receive their next clue. In Arts, teams had to choose one piece of equipment for the task: Chinese dancing clothes and pieces of cloth, a guitar, clown clothes and twisting balloons, a sword and a bağlama. Teams then had to perform in the streets to earn ₺40, in coins, using one of these five sets of items to receive their next clue.

In this leg's Roadblock, one team member to climb up a 33-metre (108 ft) ladder to the top and sound the gong within five minutes before their partner was lowered into a tub of dirty water below to receive their next clue. If racers were unsuccessful, they would incur a 15-minute penalty before receiving their next clue.

Additional tasks

- At Ayasofya Hürrem Sultan Hamamı, one team member scrub their partner with a bar of soap, only on their skin, until they found a small trinket that depicted the location of their next clue: Galata Tower.
- At Hasanpaşa Bakery, teams had to deliver three orders of Turkish bagels known as simits to three different vendors, stacking 100 simits carefully on a delivery board. Teams to wear the board on their heads and deliver it to the vendors. If any simit dropped along the way, it would not be accepted. Once all deliveries were completed successfully, the baker would give them their next clue.
- At the Pit Stop at Ortaköy Plaza, teams had to choose among five locals to stay at their house overnight.

Additional note

- Teams were not given any money at the start of this leg and were instructed that they could not beg or sell anything during the leg to earn money. Teams would only be allowed to keep any money they earned during the Detour.

=== Leg 4 (Turkey) ===
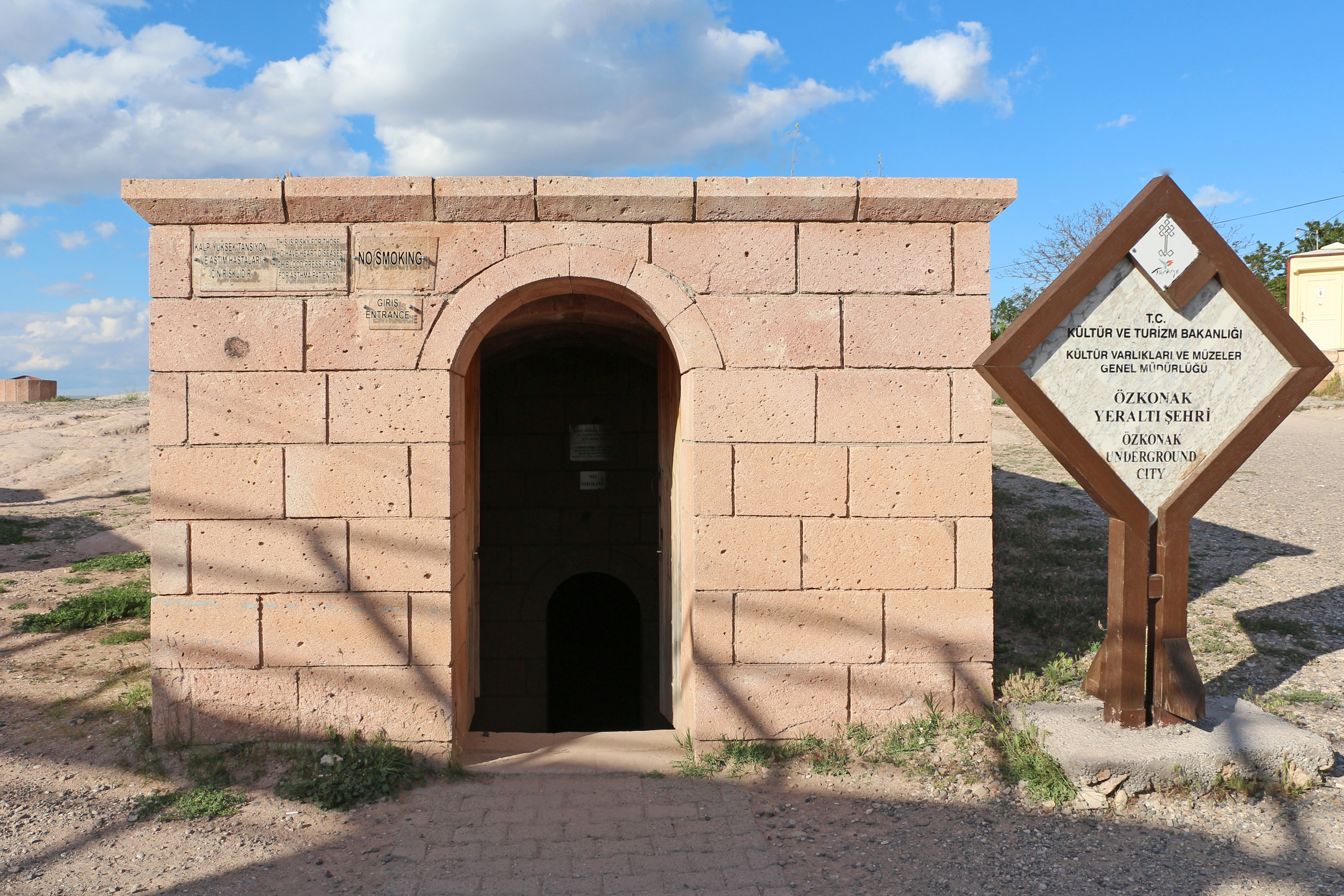
Teams visited the ruins inside Ozkonak where they paid tributes to Ottoman wedding rituals.

Airdate: July 31, 2015

- Istanbul (Istanbul Atatürk Airport) to Nevşehir, Cappadocia (Nevşehir Kapadokya Airport)
- Çavuşin (Göreme Valley) (Pit Start)
- Avanos (Avanos Square)
- Avanos (Evranos Restaurant)
- Özkonak (Özkonak Underground City)
- Uçhisar (Uçhisar Castle)

This leg's Detour was a choice between 上馬 (Shàngmǎ – Horse) or 下水 (Xiàshuǐ – Salt). For both Detour choices, teams had to drive their Infiniti to the respective locations. In Horse, teams took part in Turkish archery. They had to select three arrows and a horse and hit the bull's eye target while mounted on a horse to receive their next clue. In Salt, teams had to carry 25-kilogram (55 lb) bags of salt and dump the contents in a pool until they could achieve neutral buoyancy and float in the pool while reading a newspaper article regarding the teams to receive their next clue.

For this season's first Versus, teams competed in Turkish oil wrestling. Teams had to strip down to pants, don a belt to indicate the team color, and then oil their bodies before facing off to take the other team's belts. The first team to take both belts from the other team would receive their next clue. The losing team had to wait for the next team, and the last losing team would serve a 15-minute penalty before they could continue racing.

Additional tasks

- At the start of this leg, teams initially had to operate a hot air balloon to receive their next clue. However, due to unfavorable weather, the task was changed so that teams had to help the locals pack the hot air balloon to receive their next clue.
- At Evranos Restaurant, teams dressed in belly dancing costume according to the team colours and had to perform a Turkish belly dance known as Oryantal to the judges' satisfaction to receive their next clue.
- At the Özkonak Underground City, teams had to collect three wedding gifts by performing tasks based on the three pictures, which can be done in no consecutive order. Each picture would require teams to make their way to the rooms. The first room required teams to read out the names of the four people in Chinese. The second room had teams to extract grapes to make two cups of grape wine for each team member and finish it. The third room had teams eat five different plates of food, before they could be kissed by the bride. Once all the gifts from the three rooms are collected, they could receive the next clue. Each task have to be completed within five minutes, but they may keep the gifts if they were unable to complete the task within the time limit.

=== Leg 5 (Turkey → Spain) ===
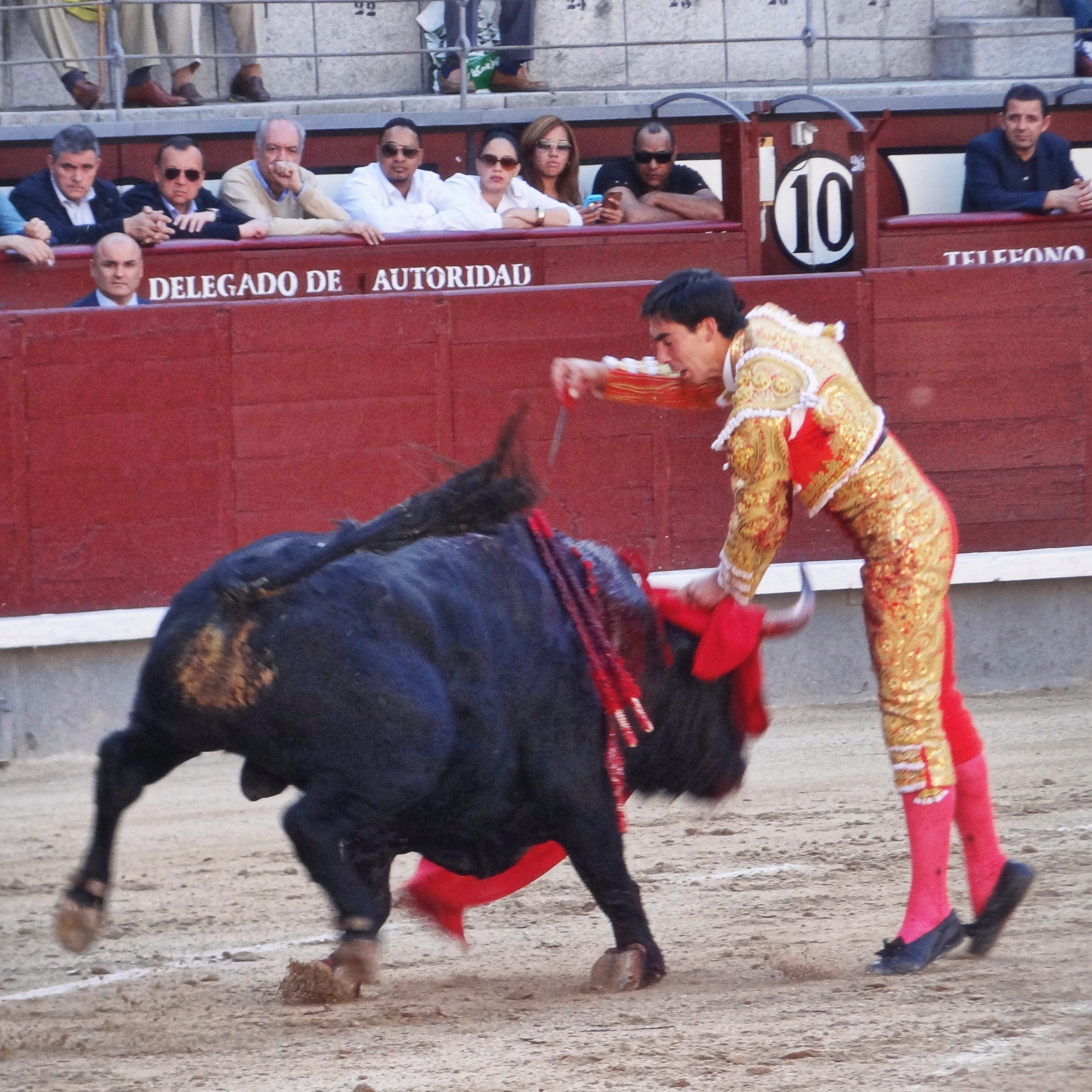
One side of the Detour had teams participating in Spanish Bullfighting.

Airdate: August 7, 2015

- Nevşehir (Nevşehir Kapadokya Airport) to Madrid, Spain (Adolfo Suárez Madrid–Barajas Airport) via China
- Aranjuez (Royal Palace of Aranjuez) (Pit Start)
- Aranjuez (Plaza de Toros or Aranjuez Constitution Square)
- Aranjuez (Virgen del Puerto Preschool)
- Las Rozas (Polideportivo Pinar de las Rozas)
- Madrid (San Isidro Park (in Spanish) – Miro Square)
- Madrid (Royal Palace of Madrid)

For this leg's Versus, teams would choose one of five items – a lance, a tennis racket, a pillow, a Chinese fan, or a pork leg – with the order of choice determined through the placements from the previous leg. Teams would battle head-to-head against the other team of a lower placement by knocking the other team out of the balance beam to receive their next clue. The losing team had to redo the battle against the next team, and the last team had to wait out five-minutes before they were given their next clue.

This season's final Detour was a choice between 横冲直撞 (Héngchōngzhízhuàng – Rampage) or 天旋地转 (Tiānxuándìzhuǎn – Descent). In Rampage, teams made their way to Plaza de Toros to take part in Spanish-style bullfighting. One team member had to build a gate using the pieces given, while the other would be a bullfighter and stop the bull. If the bull was able to get past the gate without damaging it, and perform the task properly, a torero would give the teams their next clue. In Descent, teams made their way to the Aranjuez Constitution Square. There, each team member had to inflate a Bubble bump football and had to stick one of the four coloured stickers (one with black, red, blue and yellow, the other one with white, red, blue and yellow) placed around the plaza as well as colliding to the locals. Once each team member stuck all four coloured stickers, they would receive their next clue. If they were unable to complete the task within five minutes, they could restart the task again with the field reset but the stickers collected would carry over.

In this leg's Roadblock, teams took part in La Tomatina. The team member performing the Roadblock had to stand on the performer zone and would be routinely doused with tomato juice on their head. Their partner had throw a tomato through the mouth of the board while being pelted by locals to receive their next clue.

Additional tasks

- After the Detour, teams had to travel on foot to Virgen del Puerto Preschool, where they would encounter the U-Turn and their next clue.
- At Polideportivo Pinar de las Rozas, the Spain national football team training center, teams would be trained in three different soccer movements, in no consecutive order. The first training required teams to get the ball past through obstacles and kick it on the gantry. The second training required one team member to pass the ball to another team member, who would then kick the ball to the gantry for five times. The third training required one team member to catch the ball from six professional soccer players. They would then pass the ball to the other team member. Teams had to complete those tasks legally to receive a card, and once all three cards are collected, they would receive their next clue.

=== Leg 6 (Spain → France) ===
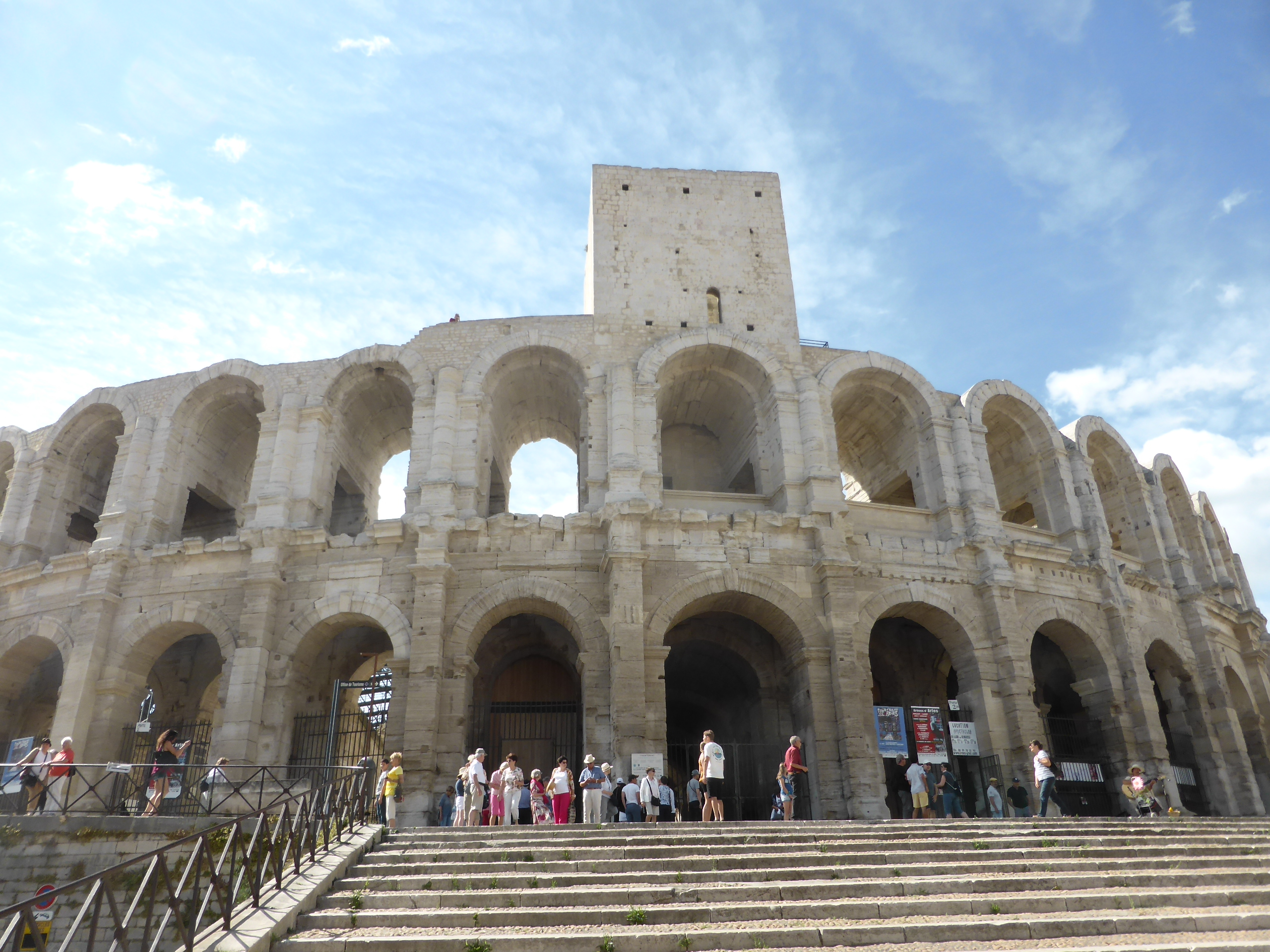
At Arles Amphitheatre, racers took part in a Roadblock inspired by the film Mission: Impossible.

Airdate: August 14, 2015

- Madrid (Madrid Atocha Railway Station) to Marseille, France (Gare de Marseille-Saint-Charles)
- Fontvieille (Château d'Estoublon (in French)) (Pit Start)
- Arles (Arles Amphitheatre)
- L'Isle-sur-la-Sorgue (Quai Jean Jaurès)
- Cabrières-d'Avignon (Sault Lavender Fields)

In this leg's Roadblock, one team member had to cross through a field of lasers without touching a beam to get their next clue.

For their Speed Bump, Deng Ziqi & Zhang Yunjing had to get a picnic box, ride a bike to the marked area, and finish all the food inside the picnic box by feeding each other before they could proceed to the swinging task.

Additional tasks

- At the start of the leg, Allan asked "Who is more romantic?" Teams had to assign one member to make their way to the kitchen to cook a dish in 30 minutes. Afterwards, the team member that didn't cook had to identify their partner's dish. If they guessed the wrong dish, they had to sit out for 10 minutes before they would receive their next clue. If they guessed the dish correctly, they would receive their next clue immediately. In either case, teams proceeded to the church to pick up their clue.
- At Quai Jean Jaures, teams chose a 30 year old photograph of one of the four couples. Teams then had to use a camera to take a picture of their couple to receive their next clue.
- At Sault Lavender fields, team members had to ride a pair of swings. One team member had to fill a cup with water and transfer the water to their partner, who would pour it into a bowl filled with ping pong balls. When the bowl was filled enough water so a ball fell out, teams would get their next clue instructing them to search the fields for the Pit Stop.

=== Leg 7 (France → Namibia) ===
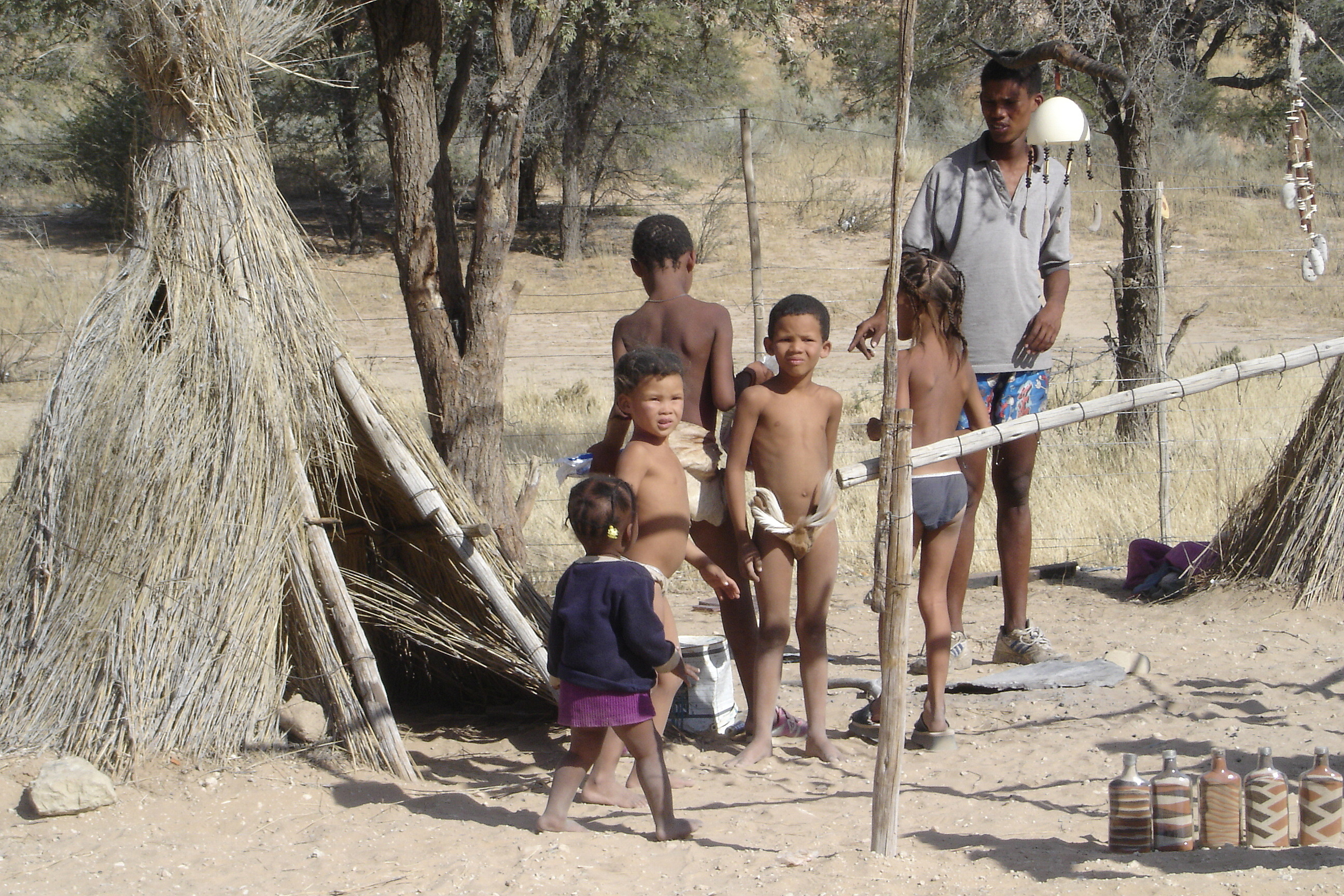
The last task before heading to the Pit Stop had teams take part in the Bushman culture.

Airdate: August 21, 2015

- Marseille (Marseille Provence Airport) to Windhoek, Namibia (Hosea Kutako International Airport) via China
- Khomas Region (Na'an Kuse Wildlife Sanctuary)
- Khomas Region (Frederik Voigt)
- Khomas Region (Clever Cubs School)
- Khomas Region (Bushmen Village)

Additional tasks

- At the start of the leg, teams picked up one of four Infiniti QX80 and made their way to the Na'an Kuse Wildlife Sanctuary. There, teams had to choose a selection of four animals of two and an expert to begin the task. One team member had to drive to the animal shelter they chose, while another team member will have to guide the expert to reach the station. Each team had to do some tasks relating to the two animals (take photo, get their footprint etc.) before moving on to the next station. Once both tasks of their choice are completed, they would drive back to the starting point and give their relevant work to the ethologist to receive their next clue.
- At Frederik Voigt, one team member had to participate in an ostrich race. One team member had to pick an ostrich and complete a 40-metre (130 ft) race course to receive their next clue. If teams were unable to complete the course within four attempts, they had to wait 15 minutes outside the area before they were given their next clue.
- At Clever Cubs, teams had to pick three children and make a paper bridge using only eight pieces of paper and a tape provided that was taller than 10 centimetres (3.9 in) in height and longer than 20 centimetres (7.9 in) in length. If the bridge created was able to withstand the weight of two drink bottle cartons, they could receive their next clue. If teams ran out of paper and tapes while working on the task, they could request for additional materials but for every set of materials teams would serve a three-minute penalty.
- At the Bushmen Village, teams had to follow the culture of the Bushman. Afterwards, teams choose a ball containing a question regarding on the Bushman culture. If they answered the question correctly, they could make their way to the Pit Stop.

=== Leg 8 (Namibia → Mauritius) ===
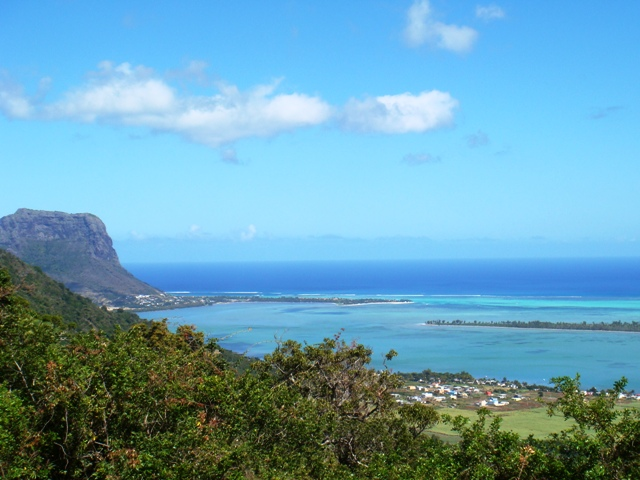
Teams competed the last series of Versus inside Black River Gorges National Park, which also served as the Pit Stop for this leg.

Airdate: August 28, 2015

- Windhoek (Hosea Kutako International Airport) to Plaine Magnien, Mauritius (Sir Seewoosagur Ramgoolam International Airport)
- Poste de Flacq (Long Beach Hotel Beach) (Pit Start)
- Chamouny (La Vallee Des Couleurs Nature Park)
- Mahébourg (Mahébourg Waterfront)
- Savanne District (Black River Gorges National Park)

For this leg's first Versus, the Intersected teams competed in kicking the coconut the racers while walking on a pair of stilts across a stretch of beach. Racers underwent an eight-minute coaching session before facing off against the other Intersected team. Teams had to kick the coconuts in stilts to a marked line in a five-minute match to score one match point. The first Intersected team to score two match points would win.

This leg's second Versus had each Intersected team assign one member to command the team while caged. The other three members, blindfolded and tied together, must navigate through a mud run obstacle course, while grabbing three numbered puzzle pieces in each obstacle. Afterwards, they have to make their way to the slide and arrange the numbered puzzle pieces to allow the toy car to move up. The team member in the cage would then retrieve the key from the toy car and unlock the cage to complete the task. The Intersected team who unlocked the cage in the fastest time would win.

This leg's third Versus had each Intersected team assign one member to retrieve three keys and jump through from height of 28 metres (92 ft) from cliff down to the sea after being geared by the helicopter. Then, the team member had to release from the safety harness and swim across one of three boats and unlock the padlock to free the other team member. The team member then had to swim to the other boats for the two other members. The Intersected team who freed the teams in the fastest time would win.

In Black River Gorges National Park, each pair of Intersected team had to assign one team to compete in either one of the two upcoming Versus. For this leg's fourth Versus, one team member had to scale six poles to retrieve five pieces of clothing. The team member would then have to wear the clothing while on top, and must do the same for the other four pieces. The team member who wore all five pieces of clothing and strike the gong first would win. If their piece of clothing was dropped, they must descend down to the ground and retrieve the piece of clothing before they could continue with the task.

This leg's fifth Versus had to be performed by the team who did not do the previous Versus. For this task, one team member had to arrange a series of gears of different sizes into a larger gear which would trigger a mechanism to raise the flag. Each gear has a peg that have to be fitted in the holes, which are arranged in different places across the board. The first team to complete the board and raise the flag would win.

For this leg's final Versus, one team member would be secured to a large wheel of death. Before the task, the person would answer five questions relating to their opinion of the four remaining teams:

- Which team should be eliminated?
- Which team will win Season Two?
- Which team do you want to exchange partner with?
- Which team is worst at reading each other's mind?
- Which team is best at playing mind games?

Their answers determined a five-digit code which would stop the wheel from spinning. The other team member had to guess his or her teammate's answers, by rotating the rotary discs to the corresponding numbers to stop the wheel. The first team to guess correctly and stop the wheel would win.

Additional notes

- The entire leg had teams Intersected with another team, with a vote to determine which teams (Red and Black Teams) would be Intersected. In a special twist known as the Cumulative Intersection-Versus Leg, the Intersected teams would compete in five different Versus. There are two different types of Versus: a regular Versus had both teams compete head-to-head, while Timed Versus required teams to work together to complete the task within the shortest time possible. The winning team in each Versus would be given two points (in form of Mauritian Dodo idols). After five Versus, the team with the most points would be safe from elimination and would be given a joint first-place finish. The two losing teams had to compete in one more Versus, and the team that lost the final Versus was eliminated.
- Prior to the start of the leg, all four teams boarded the same flight of three different classes to Mauritius. The first-place team in the previous leg were given first class upgrade as per the reward in the last leg, while the last-place team were given economy class as per the penalties for finishing last in a non-elimination leg.

=== Leg 9 (Mauritius → Thailand) ===
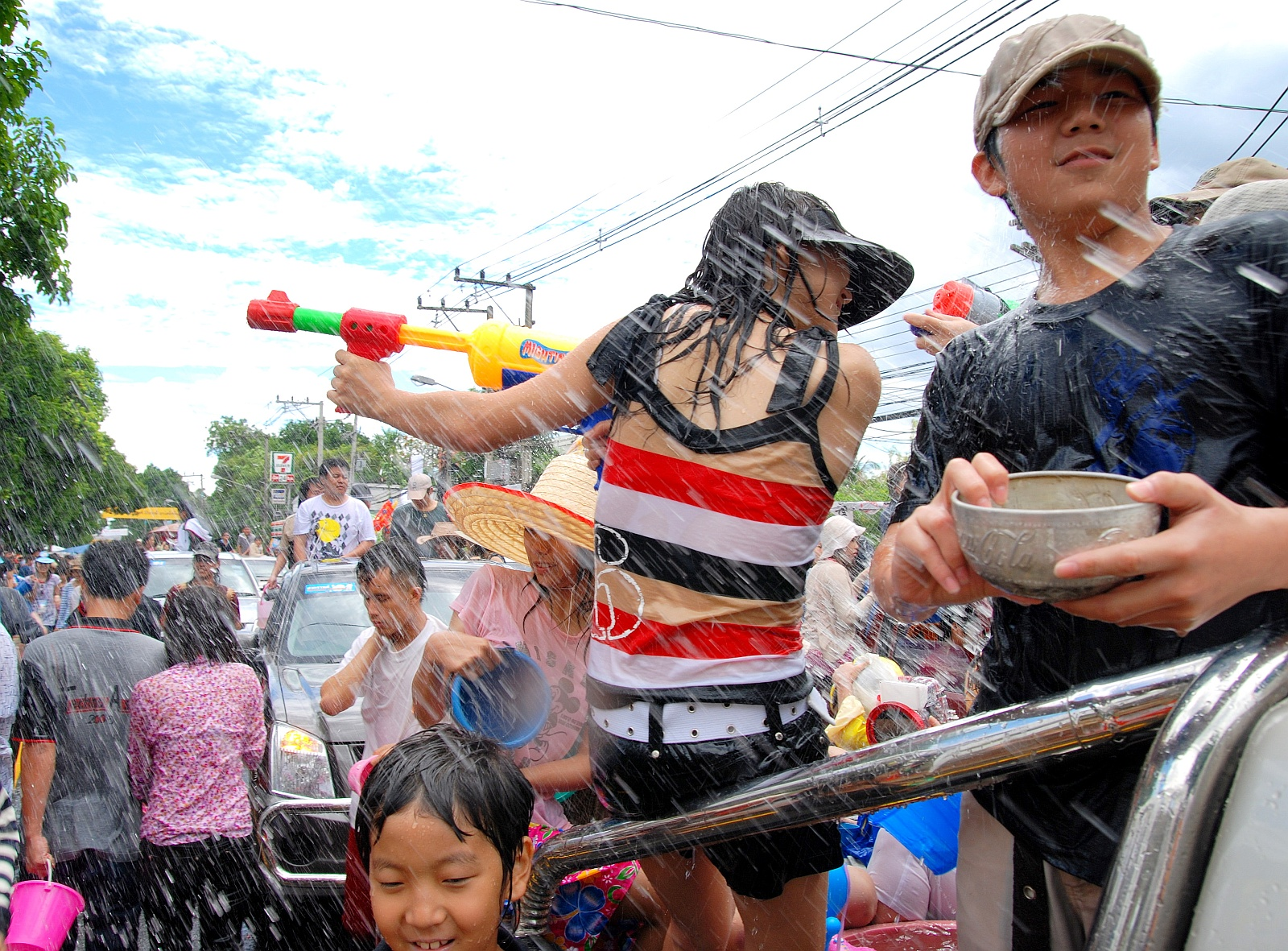
After the Roadblock, teams took part in Thailand's water-dousing festival known as Songkran (this is taken from Chiang Mai)

Airdate: September 11, 2015

- Plaine Magnien (Sir Seewoosagur Ramgoolam International Airport) to Bangkok, Thailand (Suvarnabhumi Airport) via China
- Bangkok (Wat Kai Tia (in Thai)) (Pit Start)
- Bangkok (Bangkok Noi – Pran Nok Market)
- Nonthaburi (Nonthaburi Wittayalai School)
- Nonthaburi (Wat Pracha)
- Nonthaburi (Wat Chaloem Phra Kiat – Chaloem Kanchanaphisek Park)

In this leg's Roadblock, one team member had to stack up 36 fruit crates and retrieve the clue attached from above, while their partner could assist through stacking the crates from the ground.

Additional tasks

- At Wat Kai Tia, teams had to search 100 chickens in a pen for the one with their team photo to receive their next clue. Teams had to carry it with them throughout the leg.
- At Pran Nok Market, teams had to choose from one of the four flavours available (sweet, sour, bitter and spicy), along with their shopping list of items in Thai. They had to purchase all of the items, then find a cooking station to allow the chef to cook the dishes, which teams had to consume to receive the next clue.
- At Nonthburi Wittayalai School, teams had to navigate a Infiniti QX50 by driving and reversing half of the Infiniti Logo race course in five minutes or less, while avoiding a collision with the concrete walkway. Teams had to rely on their Reverse Camera while driving as the windows and front view panels were covered. If teams were successful, they could see a phrase (QX50 AVM) from the camera, which had to be read to the judge to receive their next clue.
- After completing the Roadblock, teams would then take part in Songkran. Teams would be doused in water and had to collect the water to fill a jar to the red marker to receive the next clue.

=== Leg 10 (Thailand → China) ===
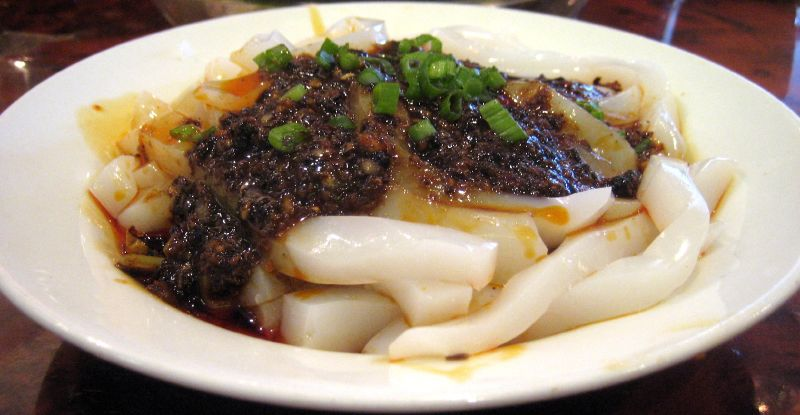
While in Chengdu, teams had to feed each other a plate of Sichuan Liangfen to receive the next clue.

Airdate: September 25, 2015

- Bangkok (Suvarnabhumi Airport) to Chengdu, Sichuan, China (Chengdu Shuangliu International Airport)
- Chengdu (Jinsha Site) (Pit Start)
- Chengdu (Jinsha Theater)
- Chengdu (Happy Valley Chengdu)
- Chengdu (AIU Montessori Kindergarten)
- Chengdu (Tea-Horse Rivers and Lakes)
- Chengdu (Jinma International Equestrian Sports Park)
- Chengdu (International Intangible Cultural Heritage Exposition)
- Chengdu (Southwest Jiaotong University – Xipu Campus Stadium)

In this season's final Roadblock, one team member had to slide along a 15-metre (49 ft) thin plastic film sheet suspended in mid-air from one end to the other to get their next clue. Should any point the film break before reaching the other end, they have to start over.

Additional tasks

- At Jinsha Theater, one team member was harnessed in a bungee cord and launched by his or her teammate in an attempt to retrieve one of two halves of the Jinsha relic dangling in the air. Once both halves of the relic was obtained, they had to hand it to the lead actress to obtain their next clue.
- At Happy Valley Chengdu, teams would dress up as inflatable Mahjong tiles and would be accompanied by four other members. One team member had to go inside the tide pool and gather eight more members, while the other team member had to arrange the order of tiles to form a hand of valid 13-tile winning combination according to the rules of Sichuan Mahjong. If their combination was validated as a winning hand, they would receive their next clue.
- After completing the Mahjong task, teams pick up one of three Infiniti QX60 parked outside the amusement park. Teams had to dismantle playground kits, load all the goods inside the car and drive to AIU Montessori Kindergarten. There, teams had to unload the goods and assemble the kits in the classroom. When the preschool teacher was satisfied on their work, teams would receive their next clue.
- At the Tea-Horse Rivers and Lakes Restaurant, teams had to feed each other a bowl of Sichuan Liangfen, using only a provided pair of chopsticks, without moving the plate from the table or have their finger touching the red marker. Once all the Liangfen were eaten, they would receive their next clue. If teams dropped their pieces of Liangfen three times, they would have to start over.
- At International Intangible Cultural Heritage Exposition, teams had to figure out how to pass through seven rows of warriors who were guarding their final clue. In each row of warriors holding a shield displaying country flags, only one warrior holding a shield that displays one of seven flags of a previously visited country would let them through and the others would block them. Teams have to retrieve the flag before moving on to the next row. Once they passed through all seven rows, a Zhuge Liang impersonator would give the teams their final clue.
