= Who Am I 2015 =

- 我是谁2015
- Directed by: Song Yinxi
- Produced by: Jackie Chan
- Cinematography: Jiashun Luo
- Edited by: Ke Lee
- Music by: Zhao Zhao
- Release date: June 12, 2015
- Running time: 102 minutes
- Country: China
- Language: Mandarin
- Box office: CN¥2.26 million (China)

Who Am I 2015 (also known as Jackie Chan Presents: Amnesia) (Chinese: 我是谁2015) is a 2015 Chinese action comedy film directed by Song Yinxi. Released in China on June 12, 2015, it is a remake of producer Jackie Chan's 1998 film Who Am I?.

== Cast ==
- Wang Haixiang as Li Ziwei
- Yao Xingtong as Tong Xin
- Zhang Lanxin as Jiao
- Yu Rongguang as Uncle Nan
- Ken Lo as Biao
- Yang Zheng
- Tony Ho

== Reception ==
By June 13, the film had earned CN¥2.26 million at the Chinese box office.
