= Zheng Kai =

Chinese actor

- 郑恺
- Born: April 17, 1986 (age 40); Shanghai, China
- Other name: Ryan Zheng
- Education: Shanghai Theatre Academy
- Occupations: Actor; television personality
- Years active: 2007–present
- Agent: Huayi Brothers
- Spouse: Vivi Miao (m. 2020)
- Children: 2

Zheng Kai (simplified Chinese: 郑恺; traditional Chinese: 鄭愷, born April 17, 1986), also known as Ryan Zheng, is a Chinese actor and television personality. He graduated from Shanghai Theatre Academy Performance Institute in 2008. During university, he was roommates with fellow actors Du Jiang, Chen He and Zhang Dianlun. After graduating, he signed with Huayi Brothers Media Corporation. Zheng is best known for being a cast member in the variety show Keep Running. He is also known for starring in films So Young, My Lucky Star, Personal Tailor and Ex-Files. On 21 May 2020, he announced his marriage with his wife, Vivi Miao. The couple have two children: a daughter (born October 2020) and a son (born June 2022). Zheng ranked 86th on Forbes China Celebrity 100 in 2015, 67th list in 2017, and 68th in 2019.

== Filmography ==
=== Film ===
Year	English title	Chinese title	Role	Notes
2010	Assistant of Superstar	明星助理	Ma Xiaoyu	
2011	Struggle	奋斗	Xiang Nan	
2013	So Young	致我们终将逝去的青春	Xu Kaiyang	
2013	My Lucky Star	非常幸运	Po	
2013	Personal Tailor	私人订制	Ma Qing	
2013	Love Run	粉红女郎·爱人快跑	Zhang Gongzi	
2014	Ex-Files	前任攻略	Yu Fei	
2014	A Stupid Journey	江湖论剑实录	Situ Yaozu	
2014	Fleet of Time	匆匆那年	Zhao Ye	
2014	Meet the Pegasus	喜羊羊与灰太狼之飞马奇遇记	Prince Pegasus	Voice-dubbed
2015	Running Man	奔跑吧！兄弟	Himself	
2015	One Night Stud	有种你爱我	Cha Yi	
2015	Let's Get Married	咱们结婚吧	Ling Xiao	
2015	Jian Bing Man	煎饼侠	Himself	Cameo
2015	Ex-Files 2	前任2：备胎反击战	Yu Fei	
2015	This Is Me	年少轻狂	Lu Xiaobei	
2015	Running Lover	奔跑吧有情人	Chen Xiaobei	
2016	The Great Wall	长城		
2017	La Historia de Un Amor	臨時演員	Li Feifan	
2017	The Golden Monk	降魔傳	Bu Tong/Jin Tong	
2017	The Loop	无尽日	He Dafu	Cameo; also producer
2017	The Ex-File 3: The Return of the Exes	前任3：再见前任	Yu Fei	
2018	The Faces of My Gene	祖宗十九代	Manager	Cameo
2018	Shadow	影	Shi Liang	
2018	Report the Teacher	报告老师我是东北银		also producer
2019	The Sexy Guys	最佳男友进化论	Fan Fan	
2019	Always Missed You	下一站：前任	Wu Chuan	
2020	The Eight Hundred	八佰	Chen Shusheng	
2021	Zack Snyder's Justice League	扎克·施奈德版正义联盟	Ryan Choi	Director's cut of Justice League
2021	Never Stop	超越	Hao Chaoyue	
2024	749 Bureau	749局		
2025	Escape From The Outland	用武之地	Miao Feng	
2026	Vanishing Point	消失的人	Tang Yu	

=== Television series ===
Year	English title	Chinese title	Role	Notes
2008	Six Cities	都市六人行	Teng Yonghao	
2008	Home with Kids New Biography	家有儿女新传	Thief	Cameo
2009	Health Team's Story	卫生队的故事	Li Chaohe	Cameo
2009	A Robbery	名门劫	Yan Zhengming	
2009	Unrivaled Jack of all trades	无敌三脚猫		Cameo
2009	Home with Aliens	家有外星人	Chang Shou	
2010	For Spring	张小五的春天	Yu Zi	Cameo
2010	A Story of Lala's Promotion	杜拉拉升职记	Zhou Liang	
2010	Single Princesses and Blind Dates	单身公主相亲记	Li Xiaoyao	
2011	Utopia Office	乌托邦办公室	Li Xiaoyuan	
2011	My Life in Yan'an	我的青春在延安	Zhao Jinfei	
2012	Separation for Love	离爱	An Youyou	
2012	Embarrassed people a happy life	囧人的幸福生活	Liang Chengshi	
2012	Rules Before a Divorce	离婚前规则	Li Xin	
2013	Dream Back to Tang Dynasty	梦回唐朝	Li Xuan / Li Yufan	
2014	Tricks of Love	爱的秘笈	Wang Yaoqiang	
2014	Love at Second Sight	一见不钟情	Lu Zhexi	
2015	Best Get Going	加油吧实习生	Zhang Sheng	
2015	Woman on the Breadfruit Tree	長在麵包樹上的女人	Tian Hong	
2016	Precious Youth	那年青春我们正好	Xiao Xiaojun	
2016	Hey, Kids	嘿，孩子	Jiang Nan	Special appearance
2017	The Times We Had	国民大生活	Wang Shuwang	
2017	Huang Fei Hong	国士无双黄飞鸿	Wong Fei-hung	
2018	On The Road	梦想合伙人	Liu He	
2018	Long Time No See	好久不见	He Yan	
2020	Love Yourself	他其实没有那么爱你	Yu Tian	
2020	Line Walker: Bull Fight	使徒行者3	The Painter	Cameo
2021	Dreams and Glory	光榮與夢想	Zhang Xueliang	Cameo
2021	New Horizon	壯志高飛	Xiao Mo	
2021	The Mask	也平凡	Ji Fan	also producer
2023	Never Give Up	今日宜加油	Li Tianran	
2023	Blossom Shanghai	繁花	Mr Wei	

=== Variety shows ===
Year	English title	Chinese title	Role	Notes
2014–present	Keep Running	奔跑吧	Cast member	
2019	Super Penguin League; Season:2	超级企鹅联盟 Super3	Player; Live Basketball Competition	

== Discography ==
=== Singles ===
Year	English title	Chinese title	Album	Notes
2009	"Reason for Going to Work"	上班的理由	Six Cities OST	
2011	"You and My Expression"	你我的表达	My Life in Yan'an OST	
2014	"Rap My Heart Out"	Rap句心里话	A Stupid Journey OST	
2015	"I Don't Want to Say Goodbye"	我不想说再见	Best Get Going OST	
2016	"Time Rewinds"	时光倒回	Ex-Files 2 OST	
2016	"Light Up"	燃点	Ex-Files 2 OST	
2016	"Now Now Now"			
2019	Run For The Dream	"造亿万吨光芒"	Keep Running theme song	With Li Chen, Angelababy, Zhu Yawen, Wang Yanlin, Lucas Wong and Song Yuqi
2020	"Fearless"	无畏的模样	Charity song for Coronavirus	

== Awards and nominations ==
Year	Awards	Category	Nominated work	Results	Ref.
2014	China International Film Festival London	Best Supporting Actor	Ex-Files	Won	
2015	Chinese Film Media Awards	Most Anticipated Actor	Ex-Files	Won	
2018	International Film Festival & Awards Macao	Variety Asian Star: Up Next	—N/a	Won	
2020	7th The Actors of China Award Ceremony	Best Actor (Emerald)	—N/a	Pending	
