= Ex-Files 2 =

2015 Chinese-Hong Kong film by Tian Yusheng

- Poster
- Traditional Chinese: 前任2：備胎反擊戰
- Simplified Chinese: 前任2：备胎反击战
- Literal meaning: Ex-Partners Guide 2: The Spare Wheels Strike Back
- Hanyu Pinyin: qiánrèn 2: bèitāi fǎnjí zhàn
- Directed by: Tian Yusheng
- Starring: Zheng Kai; Amber Kuo; Wang Chuanjun; Zhang Dianlun; Lay Zhang
- Production companies: Huayi Brothers Media Group; Xinshengtang (Tianjin) Culture; Heyi Pictures; Shiji Bainian Pictures (Tianjin)
- Distributed by: Huayi Brothers Media Group
- Release date: November 6, 2015 (China)
- Running time: 114 minutes
- Countries: China; Hong Kong
- Language: Mandarin
- Box office: CN¥109 million

Ex-Files 2 (Chinese: 前任2：备胎反击战) is a 2015 romantic comedy film directed by Tian Yusheng. A China-Hong Kong co-production, the film is a sequel to the 2014 film Ex-Files. It was released in China on November 6, 2015. A sequel titled The Ex-File 3: The Return of the Exes was released on December 29, 2017.

== Cast ==
- Zheng Kai
- Amber Kuo
- Wang Chuanjun
- Zhang Dianlun
- Lay Zhang

== Reception ==
The film was number-one on its opening weekend at the Chinese box office, with CN¥109 million.
