= So Young (film) =

- Theatrical release poster
- Directed by: Zhao Wei
- Screenplay by: Li Qiang
- Based on: To Our Youth That Is Fading Away by Xin Yiwu
- Produced by: Stanley Kwan (executive producer)
- Starring: Yang Zishan; Mark Chao; Han Geng; Jiang Shuying
- Cinematography: Li Ran
- Edited by: Chan Chi-wai
- Music by: Dou Peng
- Production companies: Hua Shi Film Investment Co., Ltd; China Film Group; Co-production: Beijing Enlight Pictures; Pulin Films Co., Ltd; Beijing Ruyi Xinxin Film Investment; Beijing Max Times Cultural Development; Dook Publishing
- Distributed by: China Film Group
- Release date: April 26, 2013
- Running time: 132 minutes
- Country: China
- Language: Mandarin
- Budget: 30 million yuan (US$5 million)
- Box office: 718 million yuan (US$118 million)

So Young (simplified Chinese: 致我们终将逝去的青春; traditional Chinese: 致我們終將逝去的青春) is a 2013 Chinese drama film directed by Zhao Wei. It is based on the best-selling novel of the same name To Our Youth That Is Fading Away by Xin Yiwu. The film is Zhao's directorial debut.

The film's English-language title alludes to the song "So Young" by the British alternative rock band Suede from their self-titled debut album. In addition to the novel, the film was also based in part by Zhao's own personal college experience in the 1990s.

The film has become a major success at the Chinese box office, grossing over US$118 million with a US$5 million budget.

== Plot ==
Zheng Wei started college as a civil engineering major to be in the same city as her childhood playmate, Lin Jing, whom she was determined to marry one day. When Wei visited Jing at his dormitory, however, she was told that Jing left for America. Unable to understand why Jing left so abruptly, Wei was left confused and heartbroken. Back in her own dormitory, Wei became close friends with her three roommates: Ruan Guan, the most beautiful and popular girl in the class; Li Weijuan, a realistic girl who came from a poor town but was determined to marry well; and Zhu Xiaobei, a tomboy. The four girls talked about their goals in life and all cheered to Ruan Guan's ambition—to have a youth that never fades away.

Wei was befriended by architecture majors Lao Zhang and his roommate Xu Kaiyang. Kaiyang came from a well-to-do family and pursued Wei romantically, but Wei only regarded him as a friend. One evening Wei went to Lao Zhang and Kaiyang's dorm room to borrow a DVD. Wei was disgusted by the messy condition of the male dorm room, except for one bed that was neat and clean, which Lao Zhang said the bed belonged to their roommate Chen Xiaozheng. Wei saw a building model on the table and fumbled with the parts. At this moment Xiaozheng came into the room and demanded out loud what was Wei doing. Startled, Wei knocked the model off the table. Xiaozheng managed to save his model by shoving Wei out of the way onto the floor.

Enraged in humiliation, Wei angrily demanded an apology from Xiaozheng, but Xiaozheng stoically replied that he had nothing to apologize for and that it was her fault for touching his model. From that moment, Wei was determined to repeatedly humiliate and pester Xiaozheng until she gets her apology. Through her repeated harassments, Wei came to realize that she liked Xiaozheng. From Lao Zhang and Weijuan, Wei learned that Xiaozheng came from a poor family and was raised by a strict mother which cultivated his reserved and disciplined personality. Wei declared her interest in Xiaozheng, and then relentlessly stalked Xiaozheng to get his attention, much to his annoyance. Eventually, Xiaozheng found himself to like Wei too, and the two started dating.

During the rest of their college life and relationship, Xiaozheng and Wei found that they had starkly contrasting personalities. Although he appreciated Wei's enthusiastic personality, Xiaozheng also reprimanded Wei at times for her laid-back and undisciplined attitude towards her coursework. Wei asked Xiaozheng why he always had to be so serious about everything. Xiaozheng replied, "My life is like a building that can only be built once, so I cannot afford any margin of error, not even a centimeter of deviance." Due to his family's modest financial circumstances, Xiaozheng believed that he needed to do everything he could to ensure the best possible professional future for himself.

Eventually graduation came upon Wei and Xiaozheng. At the on-campus job fair, Wei hoped she and Xiaozheng would work at the same company and thus remained together. Unbeknownst to Wei, Xiaozheng had applied to and obtained a graduate fellowship to study architecture in America. When Wei eventually learned of his plan from her roommates, she confronted Xiaozheng to ask why she was the last one to know. Xiaozheng explained that he could not tell her because he was afraid of hurting her and reiterated that he could not make any mistake in his life, so he had to make the difficult choice to leave her to make a better future for himself.

A few years later, Wei became a mature professional who excelled in her work, much different from her bygone youthful days. One day she suddenly encountered Lin Jing. Jing explained that he left abruptly back then because he learned that his father was having an affair with Wei's mother, so he could not face Wei. He never went to America, but avoided contact with Wei. The one time when he saw Wei on her college campus was when she was happy with Xiaozheng. Now, however, he wanted to come back and rekindle their friendship and romance. At the same time, Xiaozheng also returned from America as an accomplished architect. Though he had everything professionally that he was determined to achieve, Xiaozheng found his life hollow. He deeply regretted his choice to let Wei go, realizing that his time with her was the only time he could be his true self, and thus he also wanted to rekindle their relationship. However, Wei on their first meeting firmly rejects Xiaozheng. Not long afterward, Ruan Guan was killed in a car accident when trying to meet her university boyfriend one last time before she was to marry another man. Wei, in grief, asked Lin Jing to marry her. However, she later called it off when Lin Jing told Wei about another girl who was in love with him during their time apart. Afterwards, Xiaocheng and Wei met once more at the aquarium, where they spent happy times right before Xiaozheng had to leave for America, to reminisce. There Xiaozheng asked Wei, "I would like to start over, would you let me love you again?" Wei replied, "Xiaozheng, we spent our youth together, we owe each other nothing... youth is something you can only relive in memory." implying they could never go back to who they were hence rekindling the romance would be unlikely.

== Cast ==
- Yang Zishan as Zheng Wei
- Mark Chao as Chen Xiaozheng
- Han Geng as Lin Jing
- Jiang Shuying as Ruan Guan
- Bao Bei'er as Zhang
- Zheng Kai as Xu Kaiyang
- Zhang Yao as Li Weijuan
- Tong Liya as Shi Jie
- Cya Liu as Zhu Xiaobei
- Wang Jiajia as Zeng Shu
- Huang Ming as Zhao Shiyong
- Pan Hong as Chen's mother
- Yang Lan as Yang Lan
- Han Hong as DJ Zi Juan
- Wang Sen as Wang Yaming

== Casting ==
Xin Yiwu, author of the novel, has mentioned that Zhao Wei was actually her choice to play the lead character of "Zheng Wei". However, Zhao declined the offer, and opted to direct the film.

Besides Mark Chao and Han Geng, a majority of the cast are newcomers, including Yang Zishan, who played the story's protagonist Zheng Wei. Zhao stated, "They're very green and new. Sometimes they even lack common sense. But I like working with them because they're down-to-earth...What they lack in experience, they replace with enthusiasm."

== Production ==
For this film, Zhao Wei intended to take the story in a panorama view to the life of college students in the 1990s, "not just a love triangle", "I'd like to devote this film to everyone out there who had a similar youth... It's a memory shared by those who were born on the Chinese Mainland between the 1970s and early 80s." Zhao also bought the rights to Suede's song for the film.

Production on the film started from March 3 and ended on June 22, 2012.

== Soundtrack ==
- Theme song: "To Youth" (致青春)
  - Composer: Dou Peng
  - Lyricist: Li Qiang
  - Performer: Faye Wong

== Reception ==
=== Critical response ===
After the premiere of the film in Beijing, it has gained favorable reviews from critics and audience, and has been dubbed a "mature directorial debut".

It has also gained positive reviews from English-language critics. Dereke Elley of Film Business Asia gave the film a 7 out of 10, describes the film as "an impressive directorial debut" and praised the film's "powerhouse first 90 minutes" as "that draw an involving portrait of love, friendship, ambition and broken dreams among a group of university students..." However, Elley criticized the last portion of the film, and states "as the film abruptly flashes forward several years to pick up the characters in the big city, all the dramatic credit accumulated to that point is squandered by a final 40 minutes that seem rushed and fabricated, with none of the earlier dramatic traction." Elley summoned up "As a two-part movie running some three hours, So Young could have been a truly epic portrait of youthful emotional errors and their later consequences. As it stands, it's a remarkable directorial debut by Zhao that's well acted by its ensemble cast but is more of an ambitious, great-looking torso than a single movie." Elley also states "One can only hope that one day an extended Director's Cut of the film will eventually emerge on ancillary."

Maggie Lee of Variety described the film as an "accomplished directing debut" and "a lyrical ode to youth at its most fearless and foolhardy." Elizabeth Kerr of The Hollywood Reporter wrote "Anchored by an engaging performance by Yang Zishan in her first lead role, Zhao's film proves the actress turned director adept with images and actors... The film's first 90 minutes make for a complete enough film that the bloated, soapy final 40 become a distraction from Zhao and Li's careful character construction earlier on. It's been rumored that Zhao's original cut clocked in at three hours, and so in that light the rushed, half-baked feel of the last act becomes clear. But even with more time the "adult" segment of the film feels out of place, tonally and stylistically. Thankfully Zhao makes the most of her cast, who carry the film farther than it has a right to go." Tay Huizhen of MovieXclusive (Singapore) gave the film a rating of 4.5/5.

Top Ten Lists

- 10th - Lie Fu, Asia Weekly
- 10th - Popular Cinema Magazine
- 10th - Mainland/Taiwan/Hong Kong Film Poll (Organized by Taiwan Film Board and China Film Critics Society)
- 10th - Hong Kong Film Critics Association
- 8th - Taiwan Film Critics Society
- Mainland Film of the Year - Southern Weekly

=== Box Office ===
In mainland China, the film grossed 45 million yuan in the opening-day, and broke the opening-day box office record for a non-3D Chinese language film. The film also surpassed Journey to the West: Conquering the Demons in advanced sales according to online box office tabulation. The film went on to gross 141 million yuan in its opening weekend, and Zhao became the first Chinese female director to have a first feature film to gross over the 100 million yuan mark. Through May 5, its cume was $76.72M. In an interview, Zhao Wei said "I'm given box office figures every other day. I feel OK. I am very satisfied with what we've taken. You can't be too greedy."

=== Accolades ===
List of awards and nominations
Award	Category	Nominee	Result
22nd Shanghai Film Critics Awards	Best New Director	Zhao Wei	Won
22nd Shanghai Film Critics Awards	Films of Merit		Won
EntGroup Film Industry Awards	Best Innovative Marketing Film		Won
EntGroup Film Industry Awards	Best Production Placement Film		Won
29th Golden Rooster Awards	Best Directorial Debut	Zhao Wei	Won
29th Golden Rooster Awards	Best Adapted Writing	Li Qiang	Nominated
29th Golden Rooster Awards	Best Actress	Yang Zishan	Nominated
29th Golden Rooster Awards	Best Cinematography	Li Ran	Nominated
29th Golden Rooster Awards	Best Music	Dou Peng	Nominated
29th Golden Rooster Awards	Best Art Direction	Li Yang	Nominated
50th Golden Horse Awards	Best New Director	Zhao Wei	Nominated
50th Golden Horse Awards	Best Adapted Writing	Li Qiang	Won
50th Golden Horse Awards	Best Original Film Song	Dou Peng (Composer); Li Qiang (Lycrist); Fay Wong (Performer)	Nominated
50th Golden Horse Awards	Best Art Direction	Li Yang	Nominated
8th Chinese Young Generation Film Forum	New Director of the Year	Zhao Wei	Won
8th Chinese Young Generation Film Forum	New Actress of the Year	Yang Zishan; Zhang Shiying	Won
8th Chinese Young Generation Film Forum	New Cinematographer of the Year	Li Ran	Won
8th Chinese Young Generation Film Forum	New Production Designer of the Year	Li Yang	Won
5th Australia International Chinese Film Festival	Best Actress	Yang Zishan	Won
9th Chinese American Film Festival	Golden Angel Award Films		Won
9th Chinese American Film Festival	Best Director	Zhao Wei	Won
5th China Image Film Festival	Best Actress	Yang Zishan	Won
5th China Image Film Festival	Best Supporting Actress	Jiang Shuying	Won
10th Guangzhou Student Film Festival	Favorite Director	Zhao Wei	Won
56th Asia-Pacific Film Festival	Best Actress	Yang Zishan	Nominated
56th Asia-Pacific Film Festival	Best Supporting Actress	Jiang Shuying	Nominated
56th Asia-Pacific Film Festival	Best Screenplay	Li Qiang	Nominated
15th Huabiao Awards	Outstanding Youth Filmmaking		Won
15th Huabiao Awards	Outstanding New Actress	Yang Zishan	Won
15th Huabiao Awards	Outstanding New Actor	Bao Beier	Nominated
33rd Hong Kong Film Awards	Best Chinese Language Film from the Two Coasts		Won
8th Asian Film Awards	Best Screenplay	Li Qiang	Nominated
8th Asian Film Awards	Best Supporting Actor	Mark Chao	Nominated
8th Asian Film Awards	Best New Performer	Jiang Shuying	Won
21st Beijing College Student Film Festival	Best Directorial Debut	Zhao Wei	Nominated
21st Beijing College Student Film Festival	Best Actress	Yang Zishan	Nominated
5th China Film Director's Guild Awards	Film of the Year		Nominated
5th China Film Director's Guild Awards	Director of the Year	Zhao Wei	Nominated
5th China Film Director's Guild Awards	New Director of the Year	Zhao Wei	Nominated
5th China Film Director's Guild Awards	Screenplay of the Year	Li Qiang	Nominated
5th China Film Director's Guild Awards	Actor of the Year	Mark Chao	Nominated
32nd Hundred Flowers Awards	Best Film		Nominated
32nd Hundred Flowers Awards	Best Director	Zhao Wei	Won
32nd Hundred Flowers Awards	Best Screenplay	Li Qiang	Won
32nd Hundred Flowers Awards	Best Actress	Yang Zishan	Nominated
32nd Hundred Flowers Awards	Best Supporting Actor	Bao Beier	Nominated
32nd Hundred Flowers Awards	Best Supporting Actor	Han Geng	Nominated
