= Han Geng =

Chinese singer and actor (born 1984)

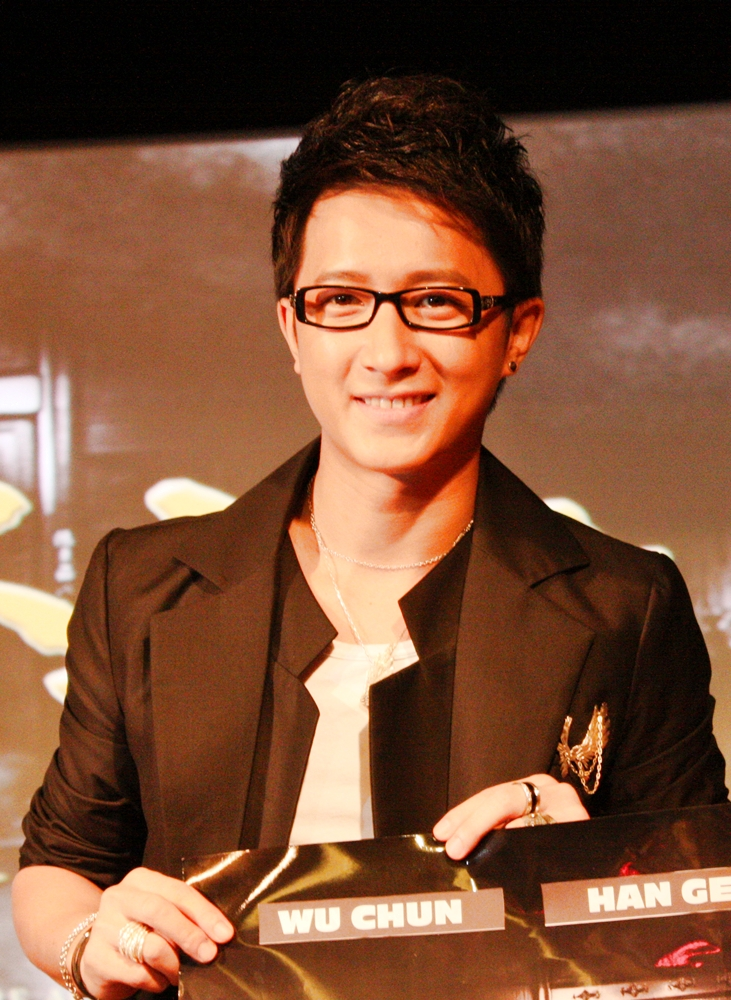
- Han in Jakarta, Indonesia, 2011
- Born: February 9, 1984 (age 42); Mudanjiang, Heilongjiang, China
- Education: Central University for Nationalities
- Occupations: Actor; singer; dancer; model
- Years active: 2005–present
- Spouse: Celina Jade (m. 2019)
- Children: 2
- Musical career
- Genres: Mandopop; K-pop; dance-pop
- Labels: S.M. (2005–10); Yuehua Entertainment (2010–present)
- Formerly of: SM Town; Super Junior; Super Junior-M

Han Geng

Chinese name
- Simplified Chinese: 韩庚
- Traditional Chinese: 韓庚
- Hanyu Pinyin: Hán Gēng
Transcriptions
Standard Mandarin
- Hanyu Pinyin: Hán Gēng
- Bopomofo: ㄏㄢ˙ㄍㄥ˙
- Wade–Giles: Han Keng
- Tongyong Pinyin: Hán Gēng
other Mandarin
- Xiao'erjing: هً ﻗْﻊ
Wu
- Romanization: Ghoe^{平} Kan^{平}
Yue: Cantonese
- Yale Romanization: Hòhn Gāng
- Jyutping: Hon^{4} Gang^{1}
Southern Min
- Hokkien POJ: Hân Keⁿ

Korean name
- Hangul: 한경
Transcriptions
- Revised Romanization: Han Gyeong

Han Geng (born February 9, 1984) is a Chinese singer and actor. He became a trainee under S.M. Entertainment in 2001, debuted in 2005 as a member of the K-pop boy band Super Junior, and became the leader of its subunit Super Junior-M in 2008. In 2009, he filed a lawsuit to terminate his contract with S.M. Entertainment and returned to China; the dispute was settled in 2011. After his popularity in China peaked in the early 2010s, Han transitioned toward an acting career from 2015 onward, appearing in films such as So Young (2013), Ex-Files (2014), and Ex-Files 3 (2017).

== Early life ==
Han is of ethnic Nanai descent from Northeast China, and was born in Mudanjiang, Heilongjiang, China. He attended Guang Hua Elementary School from 1990 to 1996.

At age 12, Han was accepted into the dance department at the Central University for Nationalities in Beijing, and left his family and his hometown in the Northeastern part of China to pursue studies in dance. During his years at the university, he mastered all 56 types of traditional dances from China's 56 ethnic groups, (Note: As demonstrated on KBS's Star Golden Bell, broadcast on September 2, 2006.) received training in ballet and martial arts, and performed in many countries including the United States and Russia.

In 1999, as a representative of the Nanai ethnic group, Han participated in China's anniversary parade.

== Career ==
=== Pre-debut ===
In December 2001, Han signed up for the H.O.T. CHINA Audition Casting, a casting audition that was hosted by S.M. Entertainment.

After the audition, Han began to work briefly as a cameo actor in short low-budget Chinese films to earn a salary before entering college. In late August 2002, Han was notified that he had been accepted into S.M. Entertainment. After Han's graduation from the Central University for Nationalities, he was sent to Korea and received private lessons in singing, dancing, and acting, as well as learning the Korean language.

=== 2005–09: Super Junior, Super Junior-M and activities in China ===
On February 6, 2005, Han was officially announced to be part of the all-boy rotational musical group Super Junior as a member of its first generation, Super Junior 05.

On March 20, 2008, Han was announced to be one of the torch bearers for the 2008 Beijing Olympics. He also sung the Beijing Olympic theme song "Beijing Welcomes You".

On April 8, 2008, Super Junior's third subgroup Super Junior-M made its debut in China, with Han as the leader of the group. The subgroup released their first Chinese-language studio album, Me, on May 2, 2008.

In 2009, Han starred in CCTV's 12-episode drama Stage of Youth. This marks his acting debut.

On December 21, 2009, Han filed for contract termination from SM Entertainment and ceased activities with both Super Junior and Super Junior-M.

=== 2010–12: Solo debut ===
On July 27, 2010, Han launched his first album The Heart of Geng. The album contained ten tracks, including the title song "My Logo", which was produced by American producer Craig Williams and Dutch producer Rene Van Verseveld. Travis Payne and Stacey Walker, along with Michael Jackson's "This Is It" dancers participated in creating the choreography for the song. The Heart of Geng topped various major music charts throughout Asia, and sold more than 350,000 copies within only 2 months after its release. A special celebratory version of the album was released on October 1 with a limited number of 20,000 copies. Han also held his first two solo concerts in Beijing on July 17 and 18.

Han made his debut on the big screen in the US-Chinese collaboration action film My Kingdom. The film is directed by Gao Xiaosong, produced by Andre Morgan and features action directing by Sammo Hung. Han also played Deng Xiaoping in the government-funded film The Founding of a Party and starred in the film The First President as Hu Han Min, the secretary of Sun Yat-Sen.

On July 19, 2012, Han released his second album Hope in the Darkness which contained singles "Wild Cursive", "Clown Mask" and "Betrayal of the Soul". Han also kicked off his "Hope in the Darkness World Tour" on July 28, 2012, at Beijing MasterCard Center.

=== 2013–present: International recognition and acting ===
On November 11, 2012, Han was announced as the winner of the MTV European Music Awards' Best Worldwide Act, earning him his first major international award.

On March 24, 2013, Han attended Nickelodeon's 2013 Kids' Choice Awards at the Galen Center in Los Angeles, where he won the Favorite Asian Act award.

Han was then cast in Zhao Wei's directorial debut So Young. The film was released on April 26, 2013, and became a major success at the Chinese box office, grossing over 700 million yuan (US$115 million). The same year, he was cast in Chinese-French film Seek McCartney, about a romance that centers on a relationship between two gay men. The film is China's first gay film and premiered in Cannes in 2014.

In 2014, Han starred in romantic comedy film Ex-Files, which went on to become one of the most successful romantic comedy series. Han was praised for his comedic timing and acting performance. The same year, he made a cameo appearance in the Hollywood blockbuster Transformers: Age of Extinction.

On May 27, 2014, Han won the World's Best Male Artist award at the World Music Awards' World's Best Male Artist. He was also the first Chinese singer to be invited to perform for the World Music Awards.

In 2015, Han starred alongside Fan Bingbing in the erotic romance film Ever Since We Love, adapted from the novel Everything Grows by Feng Tang. In 2016, Han starred in the South Korean-Chinese co-production film Sweet Sixteen, a bitter coming-of-age romance. The same year, he starred in fantasy comedy film A Chinese Odyssey Part Three directed by Jeffery Lau, playing the titular role of Sun Wukong. Han also competed on and won the 2nd season of The Amazing Race with teammate Wu Xin.

On November 30, 2015, Han released his third album San Geng. He announced that this would be his final album release, and he will focus on acting in the future.

In 2016, Han announced that he will be starring in the science fiction drama Hard Memory. He also acts as the executive producer of the series.

In 2017, Han was cast in the fantasy suspense film The Great Detective. In July, he featured in the documentary film The Founding of an Army, playing the role of Zhang Xueliang. The same month, he was cast in the film adaptation of popular video game Dynasty Warriors, playing the role of Guan Yu. In December, Han reprised his role as Meng Yun in the third installment of the Ex-file franchise.

In 2018, Han starred in hacker-themed thriller Reborn. He also participated as a captain on the first season of the hip hop show, Street Dance of China.

In 2019, he returned as a captain for Street Dance of China 2.

In 2020, Han starred in modern romance drama Still Not Enough.

Han participated in the period drama series "Legacy" which will premiere exclusively on WarnerMedia's regional streaming service HBO Go at an unspecified date later in 2021. "Legacy" is a 1920s-set drama that chronicles the lives of the wealthy Yi family and three sisters who vie to inherit their father's shopping mall business. In a time of upheaval and uncertainty, the three sisters set aside their differences to keep the business afloat and save their family. That same year he was a captain for Street Dance of China 4.

In 2022, he returned for his 4th season of Street Dance of China as a captain once again in Street Dance of China 5.

== Philanthropy ==
In 2013, Han participated in MTV EXIT's anti-human trafficking campaign as a special host for Human Traffic: China, a 36-minute documentary aimed at raising awareness to help prevent human trafficking in China. The documentary was produced with the support of China's Ministry of Public Security (MPS) and the United Nations Inter Agency Project on Human Trafficking (UNIAP), in partnership with the United States Agency for International Development (USAID), the Australian Agency for International Development (AusAID), Walk Free, and the Association of Southeast Asian Nations (ASEAN).

== Personal life and other activities ==
In 2013, Han launched his own customized phone brand, known as the "Geng Phone."

On May 16, 2014, Han appeared at the New York Stock Exchange to ring the opening bell as a shareholder of Jumei International Holding Limited. Han is the first Chinese artist to ring the opening or closing bell at the NYSE as a shareholder.

On September 24, 2014, Han launched his eyewear brand "Burqa Angel".

Han Geng and actress Celina Jade married on December 31, 2019, in New Zealand. In September 2022, they welcomed their first child, a daughter. Their second child, a boy, was born in October 2025.

== Controversies ==
=== Performance restrictions ===
Before his debut, Han entered Korea with a vacation visa and had to return to China every three months to renew it. After debuting in 2005, his company obtained an E-6 (Entertainment Industry) passport, allowing him to stay for longer periods. However, a Chinese passport strictly limited his promotional activities and appearances in various broadcasting corporations in Korea. By law, a Chinese passport holder is only allowed to perform on three television stations. Han was allowed to perform on KBS and SBS, as stated by Lee Soo Man during a Harvard Korean Wave conference in early 2007. Initially, the company did not know of the procedures and was fined because of it. Before Han signed contracts with KBS and SBS, he performed on stage with a mask and a hat to hide his face on screen. Many thought Han was a backup dancer until three months later when his bandmate Kim Heechul finally revealed him to the media by publicly taking off his mask.

Despite visa restrictions, Han performed with the rest of Super Junior at the 2007 M.NET/KM Music Festival and the 2007 Golden Disk Awards. Both award ceremonies aired on channels that Han was restricted to perform on.

=== Disputes with SM Entertainment ===
On December 21, 2009, Han filed for contract termination from his former company S.M. Entertainment, arguing that the 13-year length and structure of their exclusive contracts as well as the terms of profit distribution were unilaterally disadvantageous towards the artists and should be invalidated. Along with this, it was disclosed that because of SME's refusal to give him a day off in over two years, he had developed gastritis and kidney disease.

On December 21, 2010, the Seoul Central District Court ruled in favor of Han. SME appealed to reverse the decision. On September 27, 2011, Han and SME came to an agreement with Han revoking the case. Han will not continue his exclusive contract with SME and no longer has any legally binding connection with SME.

== Discography ==
=== Albums ===
| Album Information | Track listing |
|---|---|
| The Heart of Geng (庚心): Released: July 27, 2010 | Track listing: 1. 飞蛾扑火 / 飛蛾撲火 (Fire/Fatal Attraction); 2. Say No; 3. 撑伞 / 撐傘 (Holding Umbrella); 4. 给陌生人的情书 / 給陌生人的情書 (Love Letter to a Stranger); 5. 女皇 (Queen/Empress); 6. 因为梦 / 因爲夢 (Because of Dream); 7. 简单的人 / 簡單的人(Simple Man); 8. 心疼笔记本 / 心疼筆記本 (Heartache Notebook); 9. 爱的翅膀 / 愛的翅膀 (Wings of Love); 10. My Logo |
| Hope in the Darkness (寒更): Released: July 29, 2012 | Track listing: 1. 狂草 / 狂草 (Wild Cursive); 2. 小丑面具 / 小丑面具 (Clown Mask); 3. 静不下来 / 靜不下來 (Can't Calm Down); 4. 侧面 / 側面 (Profile); 5. 背叛灵魂 / 背叛靈魂 (Soul's Betrayal); 6. The One; 7. 玩世不恭 / 玩世不恭 (Disregard/Bad Boy); 8. Hero; 9. 还跟在你身边 / 還跟在你身邊 (Still at Your Side); 10. 我不缺 / 我不缺 (I Don't Lack) |
| San Geng (三庚): Released: November 30, 2015 | Track listing: 1. I don't give a屑 (I don't give a Sh*t); 2. 夜伴三庚 (Midnight); 3. 深夜听歌流眼泪 (Sad Song); 4. 三不管地带 (No Man's Land); 5. 逃不掉 (Can't Escape); 6. Season; 7. Tell Me What You Want; 8. 我不说 (I Don't Say); 9. 瞄准心脏开一枪 (Heart Shot); 10. 痞夫之勇 (Courage of Ruffian) |
| Wind Whispers (听风): Released: August 22, 2025 | Track listing: 1. 两两 (Side by Side); 2. 人样 (Human Figure); 3. 世界的角落 (World's Corner); 4. 冷咖啡与烟花 (Cold Coffee & Fireworks); 5. Mr.Fake; 6. Moonwalker; 7. 听风八百遍 (Listen to the Wind); 8. 世间另一个我 (Another Me); 9. 以你为名的星球 (Planet of Your Name) |

=== Singles ===
| Year | English title | Chinese title | Album | Notes |
|---|---|---|---|---|
| 2008 | "Beijing Welcomes You" | 北京欢迎你 | —N/a | Promotional song for 2008 Beijing Olympics |
| 2008 | "Dream of Youth" | 青春梦想 | Stage of Youth OST | with Huang Yi |
| 2010 | "The World Watches China" | 世界看中国 | —N/a | Theme song for 2010 Shanghai Expo |
| 2010 | "Unforgettable Memories" | 不能忘却的纪念 | —N/a | Theme song for 150th anniversary of burning of the Old Summer Palace with Tan Jing |
| 2010 | "Big Hand, Small Hand" | 大手小手 | —N/a | Theme song for Music Radio Kappa 1200 Schooling Aid with Olivia Wang |
| 2010 | "With me the Asian Games Become Exciting" | 亚运有我精彩之极 | —N/a | Promotional song 2010 Asian Games with Bibi Zhou |
| 2010 | "Iris" | 虹 | —N/a | Theme song for the torch of the 2011 Summer Universiade |
| 2010 | "I am a Flame" | 我是火焰 | —N/a | Promotional song for 2010 Asian Games |
| 2011 | "Returning Home for New Year" | 回家过年 | —N/a | solo version of Opening Performance for 2011 Spring Gala |
| 2011 | "Children" | 孩子 | —N/a | Charity song for Anti-Child Trafficking Awareness Campaign |
| 2011 | "Like a Dream" | 如梦令 | My Kingdom OST | |
| 2012 | "The Best Future" | 最美好的未来 | —N/a | Charity song for a non-profit schooling aid organization with Jane Zhang |
| 2012 | "Best Wishes from Beijing" | 北京祝福你 | —N/a | Promotional song for the 2012 London Olympic Games |
| 2012 | "The Best Listener" | 最佳听众 | Hope in the Darkness | feat. Elva Hsiao |
| 2012 | "The First Lesson" | 第一课 | —N/a | Theme song for The First Lesson |
| 2013 | "Cloud Atlas" | 云图 | Cloud Atlas OST | |
| 2013 | "X-man" | —N/a | Commercial song for Xtep Sportswear | |
| 2014 | "That Girl" | 那个女孩 | Ex-Files OST | |
| 2014 | "Who Control" | 谁 Control | Transformers: Age of Extinction OST | |
| 2014 | "Shell Shock" | 忍者神龟 | Teenage Mutant Ninja Turtles OST | Mandarin version |
| 2015 | "How Many Times Can We Love Once More" | 有多少爱可以重来 | Ever Since We Love OST | with Jane Zhang |
| 2015 | "We are the Successor of Communism" | 我们是共产主义接班人 | —N/a | Propaganda song |
| 2016 | "Love for a Lifetime" | 一生所爱 | A Chinese Odyssey Part Three OST | |

== Filmography ==
=== Film ===
| Title | Year | Role | Notes |
|---|---|---|---|
| Attack on the Pin-Up Boys | 2007 | Hankyung | Cameo |
| The Founding of a Party | 2011 | Deng Xiaoping | Cameo |
| My Kingdom | 2011 | Meng Erkui | |
| The First President | 2011 | Hu Hanmin | |
| Bring Happiness Home | 2013 | Tourist | Cameo |
| So Young | 2013 | Lin Jing | |
| Ex-Files | 2014 | Meng Yun | |
| Transformers: Age of Extinction | 2014 | Guitar player | Cameo |
| One Day | 2014 | Himself | Short story documentary |
| The Taking of Tiger Mountain | 2014 | Jiang Lei | Cameo |
| Ever Since We Love | 2015 | Qiu Shui | |
| Sweet Sixteen | 2016 | Tang Xiaotian | |
| A Chinese Odyssey Part Three | 2016 | Sun Wukong | |
| The Wasted Times | 2016 | Mr. Zhao | Cameo |
| The Founding of an Army | 2017 | Zhang Xueliang | |
| The Ex-File 3: The Return of the Exes | 2017 | Meng Yun | |
| Seek McCartney | 2018 | Zhao Jie | |
| Reborn | 2018 | Li Haoming | |
| The Great Detective | 2019 | Huo San | |
| Knockout | 2020 | Zhou Shi | |
| Dynasty Warriors | 2021 | Guan Yu | |
| Silence of Smoke | 2023 | Liu Jiansan | |
| Three Old Boys | 2024 | Lin Nan | |
| The Ex-Files 4: Marriage Plan | 2024 | Meng Yun | |
| Against All Odds | 2025 | Huan Shao/Smiley | |
| All The Good Eyes | 2026 | Lv Xinkai | |

=== Television series ===
| Title | Year | Role | Notes |
|---|---|---|---|
| Nonstop | 2006 | Himself | Cameo (season 6, episode 136) |
| Stage of Youth | 2009 | Xia Lei | |
| The Amazing Race China 2 | 2015 | Himself | Contestant with Wu Xin (winner) |
| I Can See Your Voice | 2016 | Himself | Guest artist (season 1) |
| Street Dance of China | 2018 | Himself | Captain with Show Lo, Jackson Yee and Huang Zitao |
| Street Dance of China 2 | 2019 | Himself | Captain with Show Lo, Jackson Yee and Vanness Wu |
| Still Not Enough | 2020 | Chen Jiong | |
| Street Dance of China 4 | 2021 | Himself | Captain with Wang Yibo, Henry Lau and Lay Zhang |
| Hard Memory | TBA | Li Lei | |
| The Heritage | TBA | | |
| Huan Xi Sha | 2021 | 浣溪沙 | Fan Li |
| Street Dance of China 5 | 2022 | Himself | Captain with Lee Seung-Hyun, Wang Yibo, Liu Yuxin |

=== Music video ===
| Year | Song title | Artist |
|---|---|---|
| 2006 | "Timeless" | Zhang Liyin (feat. Xiah Junsu) |
| 2008 | "I WILL" | Zhang Liyin |
| 2008 | "The Left Shore of Happiness" | Zhang Liyin |

== Awards and nominations ==
=== Music awards ===
| Year | Award | Category | Nominated work | Result |
|---|---|---|---|---|
| 2010 | Top Chinese Music Awards | Most Promising Newcomer | —N/a | Won |
| 2010 | CCTV-MTV Music Awards | Most Popular Male Singer (Mainland China) | —N/a | Won |
| 2010 | New Artist Awards of Top Chinese Music Chart | Newcomer Award | —N/a | Won |
| 2010 | Tencent Star Awards | Male Singer of the Year | —N/a | Won |
| 2011 | Top Chinese Music Awards | Most Popular Male Singer | —N/a | Won |
| 2011 | ERC Chinese Top Ten Awards | All-Rounded Artist Award | —N/a | Won |
| 2011 | ERC Chinese Top Ten Awards | Top 10 Songs | "My Logo | Won |
| 2011 | China Music Awards | Most Popular Male Singer (Mainland China) | —N/a | Won |
| 2011 | Global Chinese Golden Chart | Most Popular Newcomer | —N/a | Won |
| 2011 | Global Chinese Golden Chart | Singapore 100.3 Radio Most Dedicated Song | "My Logo" | Won |
| 2011 | Global Chinese Golden Chart | Top 20 Songs | "Say No" | Won |
| 2011 | Music Radio China Top Chart Awards | All Rounded Artist Award | —N/a | Won |
| 2011 | Music Radio China Top Chart Awards | Most Popular Newcomer | —N/a | Won |
| 2011 | Migu Music Awards | Artist of the Year | —N/a | Won |
| 2011 | Migu Music Awards | Most Popular Singer | —N/a | Won |
| 2011 | Singapore E-Awards | Most Popular Regional Newcomer | —N/a | Won |
| 2011 | Sprite Chinese Music Awards | Best Male Singer | —N/a | Won |
| 2011 | Sprite Chinese Music Awards | Favorite Idol | —N/a | Won |
| 2011 | Sprite Chinese Music Awards | Song of the Year | "Heartache Notebook" | Won |
| 2012 | MTV European Music Awards | Best Worldwide Act | —N/a | Won |
| 2012 | MTV European Music Awards | Best Asia and Pacific Act | —N/a | Won |
| 2012 | Top Chinese Music Awards | Most Popular Male Singer | —N/a | Won |
| 2012 | CCTV-MTV Music Awards | Most Popular Male Singer (Mainland China) | —N/a | Won |
| 2012 | Beijing Pop Music Awards | All Around Artist of the Year | —N/a | Won |
| 2012 | Beijing Pop Music Awards | Best Male Stage Performer | —N/a | Won |
| 2012 | Beijing Pop Music Awards | Golden Song of the Year | "Wild Cursive" | Won |
| 2012 | Migu Music Awards | Most Popular Male Singer | —N/a | Won |
| 2013 | Nickelodeon Kids' Choice Awards | Favorite Asian Act | —N/a | Won |
| 2013 | Top Chinese Music Awards | Most Popular Male Singer (Mainland China) | —N/a | Won |
| 2013 | Top Chinese Music Awards | Best Album Production | Hope in the Darkness | Won |
| 2013 | Top Chinese Music Awards | Best Dance Music Singer | —N/a | Won |
| 2013 | Top Chinese Music Awards | Best Dance Music | "Clown Mask" | Won |
| 2013 | Top Chinese Music Awards | Best Music Video | "Clown Mask" | Won |
| 2013 | China Music Awards | Asian Influential Singer | —N/a | Won |
| 2013 | China Music Awards | Best Music Video | "Clown Mask" | Won |
| 2014 | World Music Awards | World's Best Male Artist | —N/a | Won |
| 2014 | QQ Music Awards | Most Popular Male Singer (Mainland China) | —N/a | Won |
| 2015 | Migu Music Awards | Most Popular Male Singer (Mainland China) | —N/a | Won |
| 2016 | Top Chinese Music Awards | Best All-Rounded Artist | San Geng | Won |
| 2016 | Top Chinese Music Awards | Best Male Singer | San Geng | Won |
| 2016 | Top Chinese Music Awards | Best Music Video | "I Don't Give a Shit" | Won |

=== Film awards ===
| Year | Award | Category | Nominated work | Result |
|---|---|---|---|---|
| 2011 | Huading Awards | Most Anticipated Actor | My Kingdom | Won |
| 2011 | New York Chinese Film Festival | Most Popular Asian Artist | My Kingdom | Won |
| 2013 | China International Film Festival London | Best New Actor | So Young | Nominated |
| 2014 | Hundred Flowers Award | Best Supporting Actor | So Young | Nominated |
| 2014 | China Image Film Festival | Most Popular Actor | Ex-Files | Won |
