= Ex-Files =

- Simplified Chinese: 前任攻略
- Literal meaning: Ex-Partners Guide
- Hanyu Pinyin: qiánrèn gōnglüè
- Starring: Han Geng; Helen Yao; Ryan Zheng; Wang Likun
- Release date: January 31, 2014 (China)
- Running time: 108 minutes
- Country: China
- Language: Mandarin
- Box office: CN¥130 million

Ex-Files (Chinese: 前任攻略) is a 2014 Chinese romantic comedy film. It was released on January 31, 2014. A sequel titled Ex-Files 2 was released on November 6, 2015.

== Cast ==
- Han Geng
- Helen Yao
- Lee Sang-yeob
- Wang Likun
- Ban Jiajia
- Zhang Hanyu
- Ryan Zheng

== Reception ==
The film grossed CN¥130 million.
