= Beyonder (album) =

Studio album by Stornoway
- Released: 25 September 2026
- Genres: Indie folk; indie rock
- Length: 43:59
- Label: Cooking Vinyl
- Producer: Stornoway

Stornoway chronology
Dig the Mountain! (2023)	Beyonder (2026)

Singles from Beyonder
- 1. "Marco Polo" Released: 30 March 2026; 2. "The Honeyeater's Song" Released: 12 August 2026

Beyonder is the fifth studio album by the British indie folk band Stornoway. It was released on 25 September 2026 on Cooking Vinyl. The album was mixed by the Grammy Award-winning engineer Oli Jacobs, and features a guest appearance by the South African mbube choir Ladysmith Black Mambazo.

== Background and recording ==
The album's earliest songs were written after frontman Brian Briggs spent time volunteering as a National Trust ranger on St Kilda, the archipelago some 100 kilometres west of the Outer Hebrides, living among its sea cliffs, seabird colonies and abandoned settlements. A photograph taken there was used as the album's cover image. "Never have I been anywhere so wild and exposed, and never have I felt more alive," Briggs said of the visit. The island's landscape and its layered history—where centuries-old blackhouses stand close to a modern military installation—shaped a record its label described as confronting "the biodiversity and climate crises, the rise of divisive politics, and the toll these pressures take on our minds and communities".

Stornoway announced Beyonder on 30 March 2026, the day of their sold-out concert at the Royal Albert Hall, releasing the lead single "Marco Polo" the same day and performing "River of Voices" and "Leave Your Light On" during the show. A music video for "Marco Polo", directed by Susie Attwood, premiered on Earth Day, 22 April 2026.

During a live broadcast from Maida Vale Studios for Jo Whiley on BBC Radio 2 on 15 April 2026, the band announced a collaboration with Ladysmith Black Mambazo, funded through the UK government's Music Export Growth Scheme. The two groups recorded together near Durban, South Africa, on 30 May 2026. The connection came about after the choir had independently performed their own Zulu version of the Stornoway song "Josephine", from the band's 2015 album Bonxie, without knowing its origin; the choir's leader Sibongiseni Shabalala said the tune "sounded as if it was written a long time ago ... like the writers of the song are old people that are no longer singing, or just gone". Bassist Oli Steadman then contacted the choir and proposed that the two groups re-record the song together, alongside the Beyonder single "The Honeyeater's Song". "They thought they'd been rung up by a bunch of ghosts with a centuries-old shanty," Steadman told The Times; Shabalala's response was "They heard the song? They're still alive?"

The album is the band's second since reforming in 2022, following a split in 2017 that keyboardist Jon Ouin attributed in part to the fact that "we all hated each other". Writing in The Times, Mark Beaumont presented the Ladysmith Black Mambazo collaboration as a successor to Paul Simon's Graceland, released 40 years earlier.

The album's official launch concert is set for the Sheldonian Theatre in Oxford on World Rivers Day, 27 September 2026, and is to involve the creation of what the band have described as Oxford's largest ever scratch choir. A UK headline tour in support of the album runs from October 2026 to February 2027.

== Critical reception ==
Professional ratings
Review scores
Source	Rating
Uncut	8/10

Reviewing the album for Uncut, Wyndham Wallace awarded it 8 out of 10 and called it "refreshingly understated, unpretentious indie folk [...] a sensitivity Belle & Sebastian fans may appreciate [...] subtly orchestrated [...] pleasingly honest and affecting".

== Track listing ==
All tracks are written by Brian Briggs and Jon Ouin.

Beyonder track listing
No.	Title	Writer(s)	Length
1.	"River of Voices"		3:20
2.	"Marco Polo"		5:23
3.	"Fire and Water"		3:39
4.	"Skydiver"		3:33
5.	"Hummingbird Feathers"		3:53
6.	"The Honeyeater's Song" (featuring Ladysmith Black Mambazo)	Brian Briggs	3:46
7.	"The Book of Time"	Brian Briggs	3:32
8.	"Mariana"		4:06
9.	"Spirit Walker"	Brian Briggs	4:41
10.	"Wild Geese" (featuring Daisy Chute)		3:39
11.	"Leave Your Light On"	Olly Wills	4:27
Total length:			43:59

== Personnel ==
=== Stornoway ===
- Brian Briggs – production (all tracks); vocals (all tracks), acoustic guitar, electric guitar (5, 7, 9)
- Jon Ouin – production (all tracks), piano (1, 3, 4, 7, 8), organ/synths (1, 3, 5, 7, 8), accordion (2), background vocals (2, 4, 5, 6, 7, 9), electric guitar (2, 3, 5, 7, 9), pedal steel guitar (10), cello (4, 8)
- Oliver Steadman – production (all tracks); double bass (1, 3), bass guitar (2, 4–11), electric guitar (2), background vocals (2, 4, 5, 6, 7, 9),

=== Additional contributors ===
- Oli Jacobs – mixing
- Ruairi O'Flaherty – mastering
- Felix Higginbottom – drums (1, 6)
- Syrinx Choir – background vocals (1)
- Mike Monaghan – drums (2–5, 7–9)
- Charlotte Glasson – violin (2, 3, 10), saxophone (6)
- Susie Attwood – violin (3, 4, 10)
- Ladysmith Black Mambazo – vocals (6)
- James Adams – trombone (7)
- Adam Briggs – trumpet (7)
- Thomas Hodgson – trumpet (7)
- Alexander Roberts – violin (9, 11)
- Daisy Chute – vocals (10)

== Charts ==
Chart performance for Beyonder
Chart (2026)	Peak position
Scottish Albums (Official Charts)	30
UK Albums Sales (Official Charts)	15
UK Homegrown (Official Charts)	18
UK Independent Albums (Official Charts)	8
