= Oli Steadman =

British-South African multi-instrumentalist

Oliver Steadman
- Born: 3 November 1987 (age 38); Johannesburg, South Africa

Oliver "Oli" Steadman is a British-South African multi-instrumentalist.

== Stornoway ==
Steadman is a founding member of Oxford band Stornoway, and through them is a campaigner with many nature conservation trusts including HIWWT, RSPB, Wildfowl & Wetlands Trust, Woodland Trust, and British Trust for Ornithology. Steadman hosts the band's Conservation Conversations podcast (whose guests have included Angeline Morrison, Bella Hardy, Rachel Sermanni, Jim Moray, David Ford, Chris Leslie, Yijia Tu, and Arthur Jeffes). He is a patron of Sam Lee's Singing With Nightingales and a regular fundraiser for conservation projects including around the Great North Wood.

== 365 Days of Folk ==
In 2024 Steadman started 365 Days of Folk, a spin-off of Jon Boden's A Folk Song a Day, featuring daily recordings of traditional music. Having completed an entire year of learning & recording a folk song daily the project appears to be continuing indefinitely (as of April 2026 with the publication of songs #460 & above) and now tours major folk events such as Manchester Folk Festival.

== Other projects ==
Steadman has worked as a studio producer for artists including Nick Cope, and as composer / musical director at the Stephen Joseph Theatre, also serving as manager to many artists, including Willie J Healey, The People Versus, Blue Bayou, and Balloon Ascents / NEVERLND.

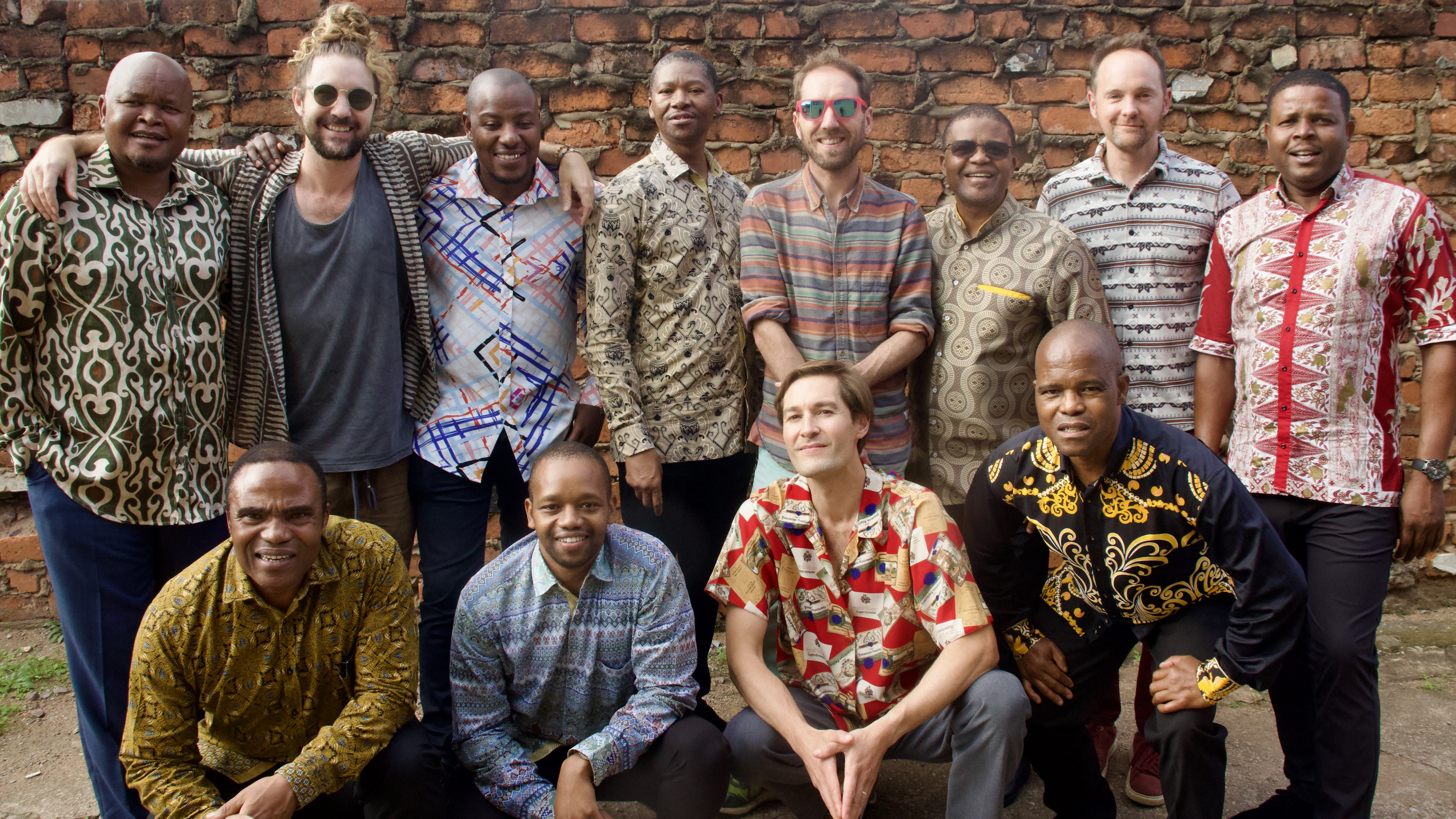
Stornoway with Ladysmith Black Mambazo in Durban, 30 May 2026. Standing (L to R): Pius Shezi, Jeremy Loops, Mfanafuthi Dlamini, Thamsanqa Shabalala, Brian Briggs, Sibongiseni Shabalala, Jon Ouin, Sabelo Mthembu. Seated (L to R): Thulani Shabalala, Gagamela Shabalala, Oli Steadman, Msizi Shabalala

In 2013 Steadman founded Count Drachma, performing at festivals from WOMAD to WOOD to Festival N°6, co-headlining London's Southbank Centre with the Mahotella Queens, and filming a documentary with The Guardian's Education channel. It was a vehicle for importing the isicathamiya and mbaqanga sounds of South Africa to UK audiences, leading ultimately to Stornoway's MEGS-funded 2026 studio collaboration with Ladysmith Black Mambazo, and Durban-based Maskandi artists Qadasi & Maqhinga.

In 2014 Steadman founded music-tech startup Tigmus, with Stornoway's touring trumpet player Thomas E Hodgson.

Since 2015 Steadman has been endorsed by Aria Bass Guitars, touring with 2x basses Detroit 313-DR & Detroit 313-BB, and recording with FEB-F2/FL or a Mexican Fender Jazz Bass. All are strung with roundwound strings except the Fender, on which Steadman has played with exclusively flatwound strings since 2009.

In 2024 Steadman established "Traildance".

In 2025 Steadman as a Friend of Blythe Hill Fields accepted Gold and Category Winner awards on their behalf following their creation of a wildlife garden, tiny forest, cherry orchard, and newly dug pond & swales.
