= BBC Introducing in Oxfordshire =

Local music show in Oxfordshire, England

BBC Introducing in Oxfordshire and Berkshire is a local music show in Oxfordshire, and part of the main BBC Introducing brand. The show is broadcast between 20:00 and 22:00 on Thursday nights on BBC Oxford and is presented by Dave Gilyeat and Alex West.

== History ==
BBC Oxford Introducing began as an internet only radio show, available weekly on the BBC Oxford website and presented by Tim Bearder and Dave Gilyeat.

The programme then launched on BBC Radio Oxford in March 2005 as 'The Download'. It was transmitted on Friday nights for ten weeks, before moving to Saturdays. In May 2011 it moved temporarily to Sundays.

With the launch of the new BBC Introducing brand in 2007 The Download was renamed BBC Oxford Introducing. In February 2009, a new tool was launched on the BBC Introducing website to allow users to upload their music directly to the presenters. In September 2009 BBC Oxford Introducing launched its own BBC podcast.

From 2010 the show has curated its own stage at Truck Festival.

In 2023 the Oxfordshire and Berkshire shows were merged because of BBC cuts. It moved to a two-hour slot on Thursdays, with a Saturday repeat.

== Format ==
The show plays one hour of local music every week. This includes a live session from a local act, a tip from BBC Radio 1, and a recommendation from Ronan Munro, editor of music magazine Nightshift. It used to feature a weekly cameo from Bill Heine.

In September 2010, original co-host Tim Bearder departed the show to concentrate on his work for BBC News Online. He later moved into politics.

== Notable successes ==
BBC Oxford Introducing regularly gives local acts their first radio play. It showcased Foals at an early live gig and secured a slot at Radio 1's Big Weekend for Stornoway. This led to the band's appearance on Later... with Jools Holland.

Lewis Watson received his first radio interview in February 2012.

The team provided Glastonbury festival sets for Glass Animals and A Silent Film, and Reading and Leeds Festivals appearances for Mr Fogg.

Little Fish were awarded a headline slot on the BBC Introducing stage at Reading and Leeds and a Maida Vale session.

January 2011 saw Fixers featured on the BBC Radio 1 playlist. The band, whose first radio play was on the show in August 2009, were also awarded slots on the T in the Park and Reading and Leeds Festivals stages.

== Acts of the Year ==
Each year the show singles out a musician or band for the Act of the Year award. Previous recipients have included Stornoway (2009), Glass Animals (2014), Willie J Healey (2015), Rhys Lewis (2019), S1mba (2020), Elmiene (2023), Artemas (2024), and South Arcade (2025).

== Controversy ==
Presenter Tim Bearder was so taken with Stornoway that he played an hour of their songs on his Breakfast show. BBC bosses suspended him for two days for doing so.

== Official releases ==
BBC Oxford Introducing has released four charity CD compilations in aid of Children In Need.

The first, The Download Sessions, featured acoustic performances by local bands.

This was followed by A Quantum of Covers, which featured local artists covering James Bond songs.

The programme celebrated its five-year anniversary in March 2010 with Round the Bends, a recreation of Radiohead's The Bends as performed by Oxfordshire artists.

To mark the BBC's Beatles Day (the 50th anniversary of the release of Love Me Do) the programme released a 5-song EP called Cover Me Do.
