= Weird Shapes =

- Origin: Stockton on Tees, England
- Genres: Indie rock, pop
- Years active: 2010–present
- Label: Sphere Above
- Members: Dan Spooner; Mike Spooner; Matt Cole; Ben Curry; Martin Bennet
- Website: www.weirdshapes.co.uk

Weird Shapes is an English indie-rock and pop band that was established in 2010.

== History ==
Formed in 2010 Weird Shapes have featured on the BBC Introducing playlist of Radio 6 Music DJ Tom Robinson & Bob Fischer; play listed on national radio stations such as Q, NME & Amazing Radio, as well as being featured on the influential BBC Introducing & Sentric Music Podcasts. The band will be playing a string of shows in 2014 to compliment their ever-growing fan base. Their debut single Weird Shapes Light/Blue Sky at Night was produced by Radiohead co-conspirator and 'There Will Be Blood' producer Graeme Stewart. On 3 January 2012 their second single was released receiving immediate attention it was featured on a BBC mix tape of emerging acts.

In June 2012, the band were offered a slot at the BBC Introducing stage at T in the Park festival 2012, which they accepted.

== Discography ==
Release name	Date Released	Notes
"Weird Shapes Light" / "Blue Sky at Night"	1 June 2011	Produced by Graeme Stewart.
"Clouds" / "Help Me to Land"	3 January 2012	Produced by Graeme Stewart
