= Eight Track Sound System =

Eight Track Sound System (or Situation)

Studio album by Fonda 500
- Released: April 2000
- Recorded: 1999
- Genre: Rock, electropop
- Length: 42:21
- Label: The Village
- Producer: Fonda 500

Fonda 500 chronology
Eight Track Sound System (or Situation) (2000)	The Autumn/Winter Collection (2000)

Eight Track Sound Situation or System is the first album by Hull-based electropop band Fonda 500.

== Track listing ==
1. "Introduction"
2. "Interstella Invitation"
3. "Dorn"
4. "International Feelings of Games U Love"
5. "Betamax"
6. "Warming to the Warmth"
7. "Ecoutez Les Grande Animaux Radio"
8. "Passing Thru"
9. "Matinee Slumbertime"
10. "Song For A Commercial"
11. "Pops#3"
12. "When We Are Together We Make No Sound Situation"
13. "Mac & Cheese Recall"
14. "Little Carnies Hi-Fi"
15. "Lucky Tokyo"
16. "The Allstar Singularity"
17. "Get Nearer To Me And You'll Always Be Warmed By My Flippers"
18. "The Spaceman Individual"
19. "Introduction"
