= Susie Attwood =

English musician (born 1986)

Susie Peters
- Born: Susie Attwood
- Genres: folk rock; indie folk; indie pop
- Years active: 2010–present

Susie Peters is an English TV producer for various British channels including Sky Arts, BBC 4, and BBC 2, and violinist & percussionist with Stornoway.

== "The Wait" and loan of violin to Syrian refugee ==
Whilst residing at a Syriac Orthodox Church monastery, where she was making a film about Syrian Christian refugees in Lebanon, Attwood met Aboud Kaplo (then aged 14) who had been forced from his home in Aleppo during the Syrian civil war. Impressed by his talent, Attwood contacted her alma mater, Oxford University, seeking help; the administrators of the Bate Collection of Musical Instruments were so moved by Aboud's story that they sent him his first proper violin. Aboud's family applied for a visa to move to Australia, and after two years of waiting in Lebanon, they were finally granted one; the story was featured in a UNICEF campaign.

== TV ==
Year	Project/Programme Title	Channel	Company
2021–present	Long Lost Family: What Happened Next	ITV	Wall to Wall
2019 - 2020	Long Lost Family (British TV series)		Wall to Wall Media
2019	Artist of the Year		Storyvault Films
2019	Long Lost Family		Wall to Wall Television
2018	Art 50	Sky Arts 1	StoryVault Films
2018	Handmade in Britain (w/t)	BBC 2	Darlow Smithson Productions
2018	Abducted - Elizabeth I's Child Actors	BBC 4	Wingspan Productions
2017	Landscape Artist of the Year - Winning Commission in Jamaica	Sky Arts 1	Storyvault
2017	The Winning Commission - Portrait Artist of the Year	Sky Arts 1	Storyvault
2017	The Wait		What Larks! Productions
2017	Further Back in Time for Dinner	BBC 2	Wall to Wall Television
2016	Portrait Artist of the Year	Sky Arts 1	Storyvault
2015	Back in Time for the Weekend	BBC 2	Wall to Wall Television
2014	Queen Victoria's Letters: A Monarch Unveiled	BBC 4	What Larks! Productions
2014	Sky Arts: Portrait Artist of the Year	Sky Arts 1	StoryVault Films
2013	Narnia's Lost Poet: The Secret Lives and Loves of C.S. Lewis	BBC 4	What Larks! Productions
2013	Everyday Eden: A Potted History of the Suburban Garden	BBC 4	Wingspan Productions
2012	Watchdog (BBC1)	BBC 1	BBC Consumer Unit
2012	The Genius of Josiah Wedgwood	BBC 2	What Larks! Productions
2012	The Great British Paraorchestra	Channel 4	What Larks! Productions

== Discography ==
- Tales from Terra Firma (2013)
- Bonxie (2015)
- The Farewell Show (2020)
- Dig the Mountain! (2023)
