= Marcos Young =

Marcos Young is an associate senior lecturer in broadcast journalism at Coventry University's Department of Media and Communication.

Marcos has worked as a broadcast journalist at the BBC since 1991. He has written and presented radio documentaries and features for BBC Radio 3, the BBC World Service and worked in local radio at BBC Oxford since 1994, where he is a producer.

He continues to cover both news and sport, specialising in off-diary stories. In recent years Marcos has got Boris Johnson to admit he intended to run for London Mayor and received praise for his coverage of the 2007 Oxford floods from then Environment Secretary Hilary Benn.

He has been nominated for two Sony Radio Academy awards for Planet Speedway, a weekly sports programme, and Global Echoes, a world music programme. Planet Speedway was also awarded a Gold Gillard in 2006 and a Bronze Gillard in 2007.

Marcos’ documentaries on Spain, including Echoes of the White Towns, have also been chosen as pick of the day in The Guardian and The Independent newspapers.

Before becoming a broadcaster Marcos spent many years touring as a concert flamenco guitarist performing at many Edinburgh Festivals and prestigious venues, including the Barbican and the South Bank. He recorded many sessions for BBC Radio 2 and commercial stations and made a mini series for the children's programme Magpie.

His first album, Flamenco Horizons, was released in 1984, featured on John Peel’s pioneering evening radio programme. His interest in Andalucia and flamenco resulted in his book on gypsy singer Camaron de la Isla called Flamenco Legend. He is a regular guest at literary festivals and is currently writing a book based on his encounters with flamenco artists in the villages and towns of Southern Spain.
