= Fixers =

British experimental, psychedelic pop band

- Origin: Oxford, Oxfordshire, England
- Genres: Psychedelic pop, dance, experimental
- Years active: 2009–present
- Label: Dolphin Love/Universal
- Members: Jack Goldstein (vocals, electronics); Jason Warner (bass, sampler); Christopher Dawson (guitar); Roo Bhasin (samplers, electronics); Michael Thompson (percussion and electronics)
- Website: Official website

Fixers are a five-piece experimental music/psychedelic pop band from Oxford. The band consists of Jack Goldstein, Jason Warner, Christopher Dawson, Roo Bhasin and Michael Thompson and formed in 2009. The debut album, We'll Be the Moon, was released in the United Kingdom on 18 June 2012.

The band cites their influences as Brian Wilson, Van Dyke Parks, Kate Bush, Cocteau Twins, Steve Reich, J-Pop and Vanilla Fudge.

== Biography ==
The band made their debut radio appearance in August 2009, when the track "Amsterdam" was played on BBC Oxford Introducing. Increasing support from BBC Introducing followed, with the band's first release, a cassette entitled "Amsterdam" seeing release in late 2010.

The band released a 7" vinyl of the track "Iron Deer Dream" through independent record label, Young & Lost Club, on 21 February 2011 – before signing a record deal with Mercury-division Vertigo Records. Fixers' first official single, "Crystals", was released on 1 April 2011 – preceding the release of the extended play, Here Comes 2001 So Let's All Head for the Sun; which saw release on 6 May through Vertigo Records.

A second single, "Swimmhaus Johannesburg" was released on 31 October, with a second extended play succeeding it. The EP, entitled Imperial Goddess of Mercy was released through Vertigo Records on 17 December, including early tracks "Evil Carbs" and "Majesties Ranch"; the latter of which was performed as part of BBC Radio 1's Live Lounge on 15 January alongside a cover of "What's My Name?" by Rihanna.

The band headlined the BBC Introducing stage at Reading and Leeds Festivals in August 2011.

NME described the Oxford band as "the most capable of thinking their way to break-out success with their avant-garde take on The Beach Boys".

We'll Be The Moon was released on 18 June 2012 to critical acclaim. Michael Hann of The Guardian wrote that the album was 'proof that psychedelia need not be an exercise in retro genre pastiche – a terrific album' and Raplh Moore proclaimed in Mixmag that 'Your favourite new band may well have arrived'. The album was The Times album of the week, calling it 'an album so beautiful and devastating as any record company could hope to release in 2012. It is the melancholia underlying We'll Be The Moon's sonic beauty that proves, ultimately, overwhelming'.

The band released their long-awaited second album, titled 'The Sun, The Moon, The Wind, The Sea', on 7 May 2021. The album was released both digitally and as a limited edition gold coloured 12" vinyl. Louder Than War reviewed the album, saying that ‘Fixers have triumphed again, serving up a gloriously optimistic psychedelic salad to take away the four walls of the present, a wet dream for nightmarish times. Well worth the wait.’

== Discography ==
=== Studio albums ===
List of studio albums, with chart positions and year released
Title	Details	Peak chart positions
Title	Details	UK
We'll Be The Moon	Released: 18 June 2012; Label: Dolphin Love; Format: CD, Digital download, 12' Vinyl	162
The Sun, The Moon, The Wind, The Sea	Released: 7 May 2021; Label: Dolphin Love; Format: Limited Edition Gold 12" Vinyl, Digital download	

=== Extended plays ===
Title	Details
Here Comes 2001 So Let's All Head for the Sun	Released: 6 May 2011; Label: Mercury Records; Format: Digital download
Imperial Goddess of Mercy	Released: 17 December 2011; Label: Mercury Records; Format: Digital download

=== Singles ===
Single
"Amsterdam"
"Crystals" (Note: The single "Crystals" also appeared on the four-track extended play, Here Comes 2001 So Let's All Head for the Sun (2011).)
"Schwimmhaus Johannesburg"
"Iron Deer Dream"
"Really Great World"

== Music videos ==
Song	Year	Director	Reference
"Amsterdam"	2010	—N/a	
"Crystals"	2011	—N/a	
"Swimmhaus Johannesburg"	2011	—N/a	
"Majesties Ranch"	2011	—N/a	
"Evil Carbs"	2011	—N/a	
"Iron Deer Dream"	2012	—N/a	
