= Carterton Town Hall =

Municipal building in Carterton, Oxfordshire, England

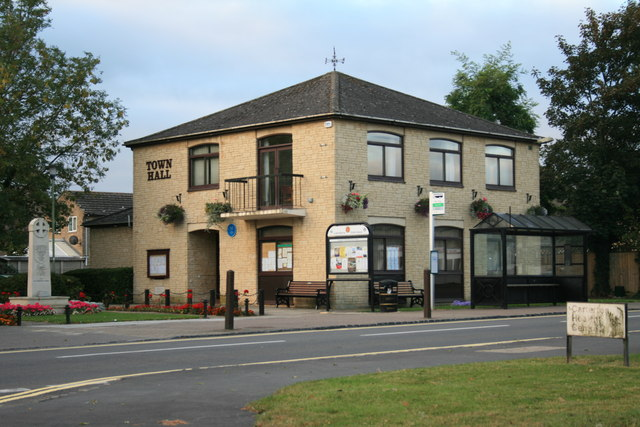
- The building in 2009

- Shown in Oxfordshire
- 51.7583°N 1.5963°W
- Location: Alvescot Road, Carterton

History
- Built: 1983

Site notes
- Architectural style: Neoclassical style

Carterton Town Hall is a municipal building in Alvescot Road in Carterton, Oxfordshire, a town in England. It accommodates the offices and meeting place of Carterton Town Council.

== History ==
The settlement of Carterton was founded by a property speculator, William Carter, in May 1900. Following the establishment of RAF Brize Norton, just to the south of the settlement, in 1937, the settlement grew steadily, and it adopted town status in about 1980. In the early 1980s, the new council decided to commission a town hall. The site they selected, on the southeast side of Alvescot Road, was open land.

Construction of the new building started in 1982. It was designed broadly in the neoclassical style, built in yellow brick and was officially opened by the mayor, Ernest Crapper, in March 1983. The design involved an asymmetrical main frontage of two bays facing onto a small garden adjacent to the building. On the ground floor, there were two segmental headed openings, the left of which contained a recessed doorway and the right of which contained a casement window with a wooden panel below. On the first floor, there was a segmental headed casement window on the left, and a French door with a balcony and iron railings on the right. The building was surmounted by a pitched roof with a weather vane. Internally, the principal room was a small assembly hall which was suitable for meetings but not for social events.

A war memorial, in the form of a cross pattée on a pedestal, which was intended to commemorate the lives of local people who had died in the First World War, and which had originally been erected at the crossroads after the war, was relocated to the garden in front of the town hall at that time. In 2004, a blue plaque, intended to commemorate founding of the town by William Carter a century beforehand, was fixed to the front of the building.

A small single storey building to the northeast off the town hall, which had accommodated a veterinary practice, was demolished in 2014, allowing the creation of a small market square and landscaping. The town hall was extended to the southeast at that time to create new accommodation for the veterinary practice as well as a new entrance with a porch for the town hall. The previous doorway was partially bricked up and another casement window was installed in its place. The new market square was enhanced by the creation of a sensory garden which was officially opened, adjacent to the town hall, in September 2022.
