= Trademark (band) =

- Origin: Oxfordshire, England
- Genres: Electropop, synthpop
- Years active: 1995–present
- Labels: Truck Records, Dreamtrak
- Members: Paul Soulsby; Oliver Horton
- Past members: Stuart Meads

Trademark are an English band, formed in 1995, and consisting of Oliver Horton, Stuart Meads and Paul Soulsby (who joined in 1999). They are noted for predominantly using synthesizers and are often branded as electropop or synthpop. They have played live regularly since 2002 and over the years their shows have included science lectures, illuminated labcoats, giant perspex bottom-plugs and slide projections. They were signed to Truck Records in 2004 and released their second album, Raise The Stakes, in April 2007.

== History ==
Trademark was formed around the time of 1995 by two teenage cousins Oliver Horton and Stuart Meads. They had previously played music together as children, under the names The Sheep and Technobeat. By their mid teens they wanted to formulate themselves as a group. In 1999 the pair were joined by Paul Soulsby.

A successful gig at the 2002 Truck Festival (where Trademark were noted as being the only band without guitars) led to a series of performances in Oxford. The band also played regularly in London, with a few appearances at The Fan Club at The Verge in Kentish Town. As the band's reputation grew, Trademark supported Chicks on Speed at Oxford Zodiac, and The Human League at Ocean in London. "Fear : Disconnnection" was finished in January 2003, and was sold by the band at gigs and over the website.

In January 2004, the band followed this up by self releasing "This is Our Trademark", an EP with a set of five tracks. This led to them being signed by Truck Records, and the putting together of Want More which featured tracks from "Fear:Disconnnection" and "This is Our Trademark" plus a few new tracks. Want More was released in June 2004 to the critical acclaim of The Sunday Times among others. In December 2004 Trademark went on tour with the Human League around the UK.

At the start of 2005 they started recording the follow-up to Want More. The recording took eighteen months to complete as the band wanted to explore new production techniques and instrumentations. During this time the band continued to gig in the UK, and recording was finally completed in May 2006. Due to complications with arranging distribution and PR, the album, Raise the Stakes, was eventually released in April 2007.

Founder member Stuart Meads died in an accident in 2013.

The original Audiologue album was remastered and reissued on 30 August 2019 as a '20th Anniversary Remaster', available as a download and limited edition (100 copies) CD.

Trademark have produced remixes for other artists in addition to their usual work. Artists include Matinee Club (formerly the Modern), Boy Kill Boy, Cas Fox, Goldrush and Kish Mauve.

== Style ==
Plan B critic Tim Chipping said of Trademark, "Their sound is soft, kind; controlled to facilitate understanding. Trademark are staking their reputation on love being found in the pure pop song; taking on the work abandoned in the early Eighties by Vince Clarke when he left the institute of Depeche Mode (in association with the Kraftwerk tests carried out by Orchestral Manoeuvres in the Dark).

== Discography ==
=== Albums ===
- Fear:Disconnection (2003)
- Want More (2004, Truck Records)
- Raise the Stakes (2006, Truck Records)
- Trademark (2014, Dreamtrak)
- Audiologue (20th Anniversary Remaster) (2019, Dreamtrak)

=== EPs ===
- "This Is Our Trademark" (2004)
- "Interim" (2004)
- "At Loch Shiel" (2009, Dreamtrak)

=== Early works ===
- "Registered" (1995)
- "Industrial" (1997)
- "Obscure" (1998)
- "Audiologue" (1999)
