= Meanwhile, Back in Communist Russia... =

UK musical group

Meanwhile, Back in Communist Russia…
- Origin: United Kingdom
- Genres: Post-rock
- Years active: 1999–2004
- Labels: Truck Records, Jitter
- Past members: Tim Croston - keyboards Pete Williams - guitar James Shames - guitar Emily Gray - vocals Ed Carder - vocals Mark Halloran - guitar, drum machine Ollie Cluit - bass guitar

Meanwhile, Back in Communist Russia... (MBICR) was a post-rock band from Oxford, England.

== History ==
=== Formation ===
Meanwhile, Back in Communist Russia... was founded in 1999. The band's original line up was the keyboard player Tim Croston, guitarists Pete Williams and James Shames, singers Emily Gray and Ed Carder and guitarist and drum machine operator Mark Halloran, all students at the University of Oxford. Bass guitar player Ollie Clueit joined late in 1999 before Carder left. The band's music had Gray deliver self-written monologues over guitar noise and samples guided by a beat, drawing comparisons to Arab Strap.

The band's first release was a split CD single with Moonkat on the Jitter record label. One track, "Morning-After Pill", was played on BBC Radio 1 and XFM in London. Jitter then released a limited 7" disc with the tracks "Morning-After Pill" and "No Cigar", which prompted John Peel to offer the band its first of two Peel Sessions, as well as a live performance in Birmingham on John Peel's programme in October 2001 .

The band recorded its first album, Indian Ink, that summer which was again released by Jitter on CD and 10" vinyl. Later that year, the band was chosen by Peel to support Pulp at a Radio 1 event in Birmingham and "Morning-After Pill" was voted number 11 in John Peel's 2001 Festive 50.

=== Disbandment and aftermath ===
In 2013, Gray started to work with the group Distant Correspondent and she appears on several tracks of their first, self-titled album.

== Discography ==
=== Albums ===
- Indian Ink (2001) CD and 10" vinyl LP
- My Elixir, My Poison (2003) CD

=== Singles ===
- No Cigar (2000)
- Morning-After Pill (2001)
- I Only Wanted Something Else to Do but Hang Around (2001)
