= Truck Festival =

Annual music festival in England

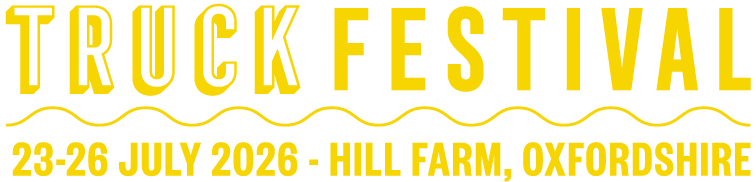
- 2026 logo
- Genre: Rock, Indie, Dance
- Dates: 23–26 July (2026); For previous dates, see § Years
- Locations: Steventon, Oxfordshire, England
- Years active: 1998–present
- Capacity: 30,000

Truck Festival is an annual independent music festival in Oxfordshire, England. Truck Festival started in 1998, founded by the Bennett family (including the brothers Robin and Joe of the band Goldrush). The Bennett family decided that mainstream festivals such as Glastonbury had become too commercial and predictable. Truck Festival is held in July at Hill Farm in Steventon, Oxfordshire, which lies between Abingdon, Didcot and Wantage. The festival also gave birth to the Truck Records label in 1999.

The main stage was originally constructed from three large flatbed trucks, giving rise to a common misperception is that this is where the name of the festival comes from. However, in 2007 Robin Bennett wrote on the official Truck website: "Contrary to popular belief, the name Truck actually came from a compilation CD I picked up, 'Ten Trucking Greats', the soundtrack of the movie Convoy."

== Overview ==
Truck Festival has grown somewhat since its inception, but with an annual attendance of around 30,000 it is dwarfed by the likes of Glastonbury (around 210,000 people) and Reading/Leeds. Part of Truck's appeal to fans is that it can be viewed as a microcosm of these larger festivals, with a similar layout and facilities but on a more manageable scale. Due to a variety of factors, chiefly the layout of Hill Farm, it is highly unlikely that Truck has any potential for significant growth in the near future.

Hill Farm remains a working farm, shutting down only temporarily to allow the festival to take place. Among Truck's six stages is the so-called "Barn That Cannot Be Named"—a cow shed with a stage set up at one end—which is a popular place to watch bands and comedians at the festival. The Barn mainly plays host to metal, emo, hardcore and punk acts, but on Saturday evening turns into an arena for drum and bass and other dance music.

Other stages include Trailer Park (renamed The Village Pub in 2008), a marquee in the main arena which features the more esoteric indie bands during the day, and breakbeat on Saturday night; the Lounge (renamed the Beat Hive in 2008), a smaller marquee which used to specialize in more ambient and chilled performances during the day, and trance during the night but now plays host to a number of local, national, and international bands and DJs as well as a range of electronic music; the Market tent, which is set in the market area a short walk from the main field and features mainly folk-oriented music, becoming a retro disco/karaoke venue on Saturday night; and the Theatre/Fringe tent (renamed the Pavilion in 2008), which hosts non-musical acts such as theatrical performances, stand-up comedy, performance art and spoken-word performers.

The festival prides itself on its family atmosphere, with all of the site services being provided by local groups: the food stall is run by the local Rotary Club, and ice cream is sold by the local vicar. All profits from the festival go to charity.

A compilation album is released each year on Truck Records to coincide with the festival, featuring tracks (mainly studio recordings) from various bands playing at the festival.

Several sister festivals have been launched in recent years. The annual Wood festival, at Braziers Park in Oxfordshire, was first held in 2008 and is run with an emphasis on the environment. EquiTruck has been held in January every year since 2006, at the midpoint between Truck Festivals, and is run by the Truck Festival bar staff. UniTruck was created out of the abandoned 2007 Truck Festival, which had to be moved to Oxford Brookes University at short notice. The first two festivals (in July and November 2007) were held at Oxford Brookes, followed by an event in December 2007 at Bucks New University in High Wycombe, which has become an annual event (now in November). Truck America was launched in April 2010, at the Full Moon Resort in New York City.

After a difficult 2011, with poor ticket sales threatening the future of the festival, Robin and Joe Bennett announced they would be stepping down. The festival continued in 2012 under the management of the Y Not Festival and the event was sold out. Superstruct Entertainment, the live entertainment platform backed by Providence Equity Partners, owns the festival after it entered a definitive agreement for the acquisition of several live music and entertainment festivals from Global Media & Entertainment and Broadwick Live in April 2019.

In 2019 the capacity of the festival was 10,000.

== Years ==
=== Truck One ===
Was held on 22 September 1998.

==== Truck stage ====
Saturday 22 September
- Nought
- ATL
- Nebula
- Fan Modine
- Black Candy
- Holy Roman Empire
- Swiss
- Merlin

=== Truck Two ===
Now extended to two days, Truck Two was held on the weekend of 10–11 July 1999

Sunday night headliners were King Prawn. Other acts included Black Candy, Lab-4 and Dustball.

==== Truck stage ====
Saturday 10 July	Sunday 11 July
Dustball; Samurai Seven; ATL; Frigid Vinegar; Wonderland; Canola; Nebula; Mecca; Four Way Trauma; Chamfer; Moonkat; Holy Roman Empire	King Prawn; Whispering Bob; Four Storeys; Dolly; Overground; Hester Thrale; Vade Mecum; Murry the Hump; Black Candy; Winnebago Deal

==== Barn stage ====
Saturday 10 July	Sunday 11 July
Full Frontal Assault; Orko; Saloon; Skinny Arm; The Stars of Track & Field (Oxford); Kamikaze Kitten; Suntrap; Venus	Black Candy; Mindsurfer; Callous; The Return of Id; Jacuzzi Fiasco; Abraham Lincoln Dream; Lowblow; Merlin

Tickets cost £5 for the weekend.

=== Truck Three ===
On the weekend of 22–23 July 2000. Bands that played included The Blue Aeroplanes and Rothko.

==== Truck stage ====
Saturday 22 July	Sunday 23 July
Narco; Seafood; Whispering Bob; Goldblade; Pluto Monkey; The Samurai Seven; Canola; Jack Drag; Black Candy; The Junket; Twinjet Superstar; The Rag Foundation; Vade Mecum; Red2; Autopsy	Unbelievable Truth; Tom Hingley; Blue Aeroplanes; Pecadiloes; Matt Evans; Four Storeys; The Arlenes; Medal; Julie Murphy; Vigilance Black Special; Saloon; Interseed; Wingnut (james kennedy); Tim Cairns' band; Relationships

==== Barn stage ====
Saturday 22 July	Sunday 23 July
Rothko; The Klyvz; The Edmund Fitzgerald; KaitO; Frogmen in Pursuit; Hester Thrale; Big Speakers; Black Nielson; The Rock of Travolta; Deep Red Groove; Scuzzsonic	JOR; Brutal Delux; Mote; Mindsurfer; Headcount; Inline Sk8ing Barbies; Defenestration; Autonomy; High & Mighty; Cobalt 60; Stoofa; Dilutural; Shouting Myke; Waste Monkey

Tickets cost £10 for the weekend.

=== Truck Four ===
On the weekend of 21–22 July 2001, Truck was headlined by The Rock of Travolta, who had recently supported Radiohead on their homecoming concert at South Park. The lineup included local bands such as Four Storeys and The Samurai Seven, as well as cult Glasgow band, Cannon and John Otway.

==== Truck stage ====
Saturday 21 July	Sunday 22 July
The Rock of Travolta; Goldrush; Murry the Hump; Dustball; Jor; Electralane; The Four Storeys; The Samurai Seven; Tongue & Groove; Blue Kite; Marconi's Voodoo	Black Candy; Six by Seven; Seafood; Fonda 500; Don Mandarin; Black Nielson; Joel Plaskett Emergency; John Otway; Marianne Hyatt

==== Barn stage ====
Saturday 21 July	Sunday 22 July
Mo-Ho-Bish-O-Pi; Meanwhile, back in Communist Russia...; KaitO; Finlay; X-1; Manatee; South Sea Company Prospectus; Cannon; Captain Howdy; Moonkat; Mooz	Menlo Park; Chineseburn; Smilex; One Dice; Faith in Hate; Stoo*fa; Coma Kai; Antonia

Tickets cost £15 for the weekend.

=== Truck Five ===
Truck Five took place on 20–21 July 2002. As usual, the lineup was largely taken from the local music scene, including bands like Meanwhile, back in Communist Russia... and Eeebleee, but also with upcoming bands from further afield such as Lapsus Linguae.

Other acts included were; Antonia, Black Nielson, Caretaker, Cat on Form, Chris TT, Dustball, Finlay, Edible 5 ft Smiths, Fonda 500, Goldrush, Jetplane Landing, Jim Crosskey, KTB, Lapsus Linguae, Lightyear, Luke Smith, Mountain Men Anonymous, National Prayer Breakfast, Pug, The Rock of Travolta, Rachel Dadd, Scott Parker, Six Ray Sun, 65 Days of Static, South Sea Company Prospectus, Toby Kidd, Torqmada and The Young Knives.

==== Truck stage ====
Saturday 20 July	Sunday 21 July
Jetplane Landing; Goldrush; Fonda 500; Black Nielson; The Young Knives; Six Ray Sun; McLusky	Southsea Company Prospectus; Handsome Family; Chris T-T; Marconi's Voodoo

==== Barn stage ====
Saturday 20 July	Sunday 21 July
The Rock of Travolta; Meanwhile, back in Communist Russia...; Dustball; Lapsus Linguae; Cat on Form; Edible 5 ft Smiths	Lightyear; Jor; Coma Kai; Winnebago Deal; The Band That Cannot Be Named; Sextodecimo; Caliber

==== Trailerpark Tent ====
Saturday 20 July	Sunday 21 July
Seafood; The Samurai Seven; The Four Storeys; Mackating; KTB	Tompaulin; Tongue & Groove; Antonia

Tickets cost £15 if they were bought before the end of June 2002, rising to £20 after.

=== Truck Six ===
19–20 July 2003 saw bands like British Sea Power and The Futureheads supporting Goldrush, who teamed up with Mark Gardener from Oxford band Ride to headline the festival.

Tickets cost £20 for the weekend if bought before the end of June 2003 rising to £25 after.

=== Truck Seven ===
Held on the weekend of 24–25 July 2004

Headliners on Friday were Japanese power trio Electric Eel Shock and on Saturday Brighton's Eighties Matchbox B-Line Disaster. Other Acts who played included; Goldrush, Buck 65, Cristian Vogel, Chip Taylor and Carrie Rodriguez, Black Nielson, KTB, Dive Dive, Chris T-T, Kaito, MC Lars, Trademark, Toulouse, Days of Grace, Tiger Club, eeeblee, Villa Real, Nervous Test Pilot, The Evenings, Piney Gir, Luke Smith, Igloo, I Love Lucy, Black Madonnas, Swearing at Motorists, Sunnyvale Noise Sub-Element, The Epsteins, The Shit, Stars of Aviation, Lach, Kate Garrett, Thomas Truax, Chantelle Pike, The Mon£yshots The Henry Big Band, The Orff Orchestra, and The Schla la las.

Tickets cost £25 if bought before the end of June 2004, rising to £35 after.

=== Truck Eight ===
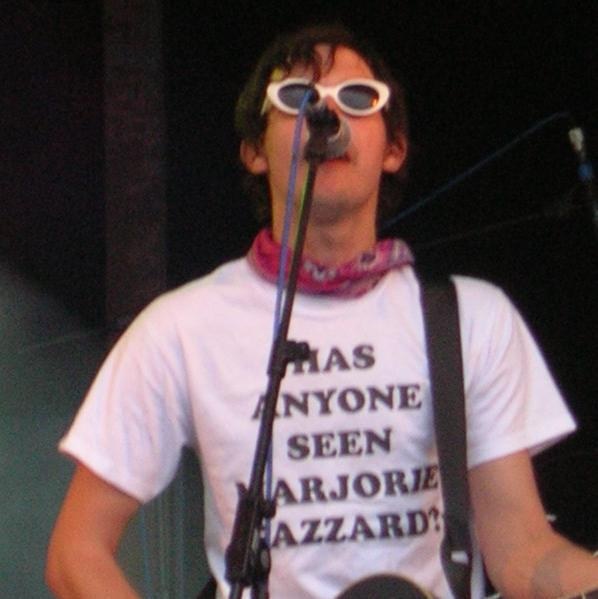
Robin Bennett, frontman of the band Goldrush, on stage at the 2005 Truck Festival

In 2005 the event took place on 23–24 July and was headlined on Saturday night by Biffy Clyro and on Sunday by The Magic Numbers. Other acts near the top of the bill included The Raveonettes, MC Lars, Do Me Bad Things and Goldrush.

Tickets cost £27.50 for the weekend if bought before the end of June 2005 and £37.50 if bought after.

=== Truck Nine ===
The 2006 festival took place on 22–23 July. Tickets went on sale online from 1 March and sold out in a record eight days, although to safeguard against complaints from locals that outsiders were taking over a small, local event, tickets were also available from 1 February at just eight Oxfordshire shops.

The headlining acts were The Futureheads on Saturday and Mystery Jets on Sunday. Other acts near the top of the bill included Hundred Reasons, ¡Forward, Russia!, Goldrush, Brakes, MC Lars, Skindred and Get Cape. Wear Cape. Fly (Saturday); and Regina Spektor, Young Knives, Seth Lakeman, The Electric Soft Parade, Buck 65 and Chicks on Speed (Sunday).

BBC 6 Music covered the festival for the first time, with Marc Riley and Andrew Collins among those in attendance. Truck Nine also abandoned the traditional early finish on Sunday night by allowing camping over two nights.

Tickets cost £40 for the weekend.

=== Truck Ten ===
Truck Ten was originally scheduled for 21–22 July 2007. Tickets sold out in just three days. However, due to flooding (see 2007 United Kingdom floods), the festival was postponed the day before it was due to start. A replacement event was quickly arranged at Oxford Brookes University, featuring some of the bands who were scheduled to play the festival.

The festival was rescheduled for the reserve dates of 22–23 September (the anniversary weekend of the first festival in 1998), with tickets remaining valid. Most of the original published lineup were able to return, although notable exceptions included The Brian Jonestown Massacre, Hopewell, Jack Peñate, Lethal Bizzle, Chase & Status and DJ Fresh. Oxford band Foals' set had to be rearranged after fear for safety in the Trailer Park tent. Their set on Saturday night saw them perform to a packed barn full of ecstatic truckers. The headliners were Idlewild on Sunday, and Garth Hudson (formerly of The Band) on Saturday, backed by a group including his wife Maud on lead vocals, and members of Goldrush and Grand Drive. Other artists on the bill included Glenn Tilbrook, Goldrush, Brakes, The Electric Soft Parade, John Power, Pull Tiger Tail, Metronomy and Grand Drive. The festival also featured the last performance of The Schla La Las.

Tickets cost £55 for the weekend.

=== Truck Eleven ===
Truck Eleven was held over the weekend of 19–20 July 2008. The Saturday headliners were The Lemonheads, whose performance included the entirety of their album It's a Shame About Ray. Sunday's headliners were Get Cape. Wear Cape. Fly, who first played the festival in 2004. Other acts included Altern-8, Camera Obscura, Dodgy, The Early Years, Emmy the Great, Fighting with Wire, Fonda 500, Neil Halstead, Eamon Hamilton, Kyte, Le Volume Courbe, Maps, Laura Marling, Ian McLagan and The Bump Band, Ruth Minnikin, Noah and the Whale, Okkervil River, Piney Gir, Ralfe Band, The Research, Ulrich Schnauss, Walter Schreifels (as Blimey and the Governors), Martin Simpson, Spectrum, Television Personalities, These New Puritans, Frank Turner and Youthmovies.

Tickets cost £60 for the weekend.

==== Truck stage ====
Saturday 19 July	Sunday 20 July
The Lemonheads; Okkervil River; Ian McLagan & the Bump Band; Danny and the Champions of the World	Get Cape. Wear Cape. Fly; Camera Obscura; Frank Turner; Fighting With Wire

=== Truck Twelve ===
Truck Twelve took place on the weekend of 25–26 July 2009 The Saturday headliners were Ash, while local music stalwarts Supergrass closed proceedings on a Sunday night. Other acts included Red Light Company, Yacht, Errors, Mark Olson & Gary Louris, And So I Watch You from Afar, Broken Records, Sportsday Megaphone, Data.select.party, Pete Molinari, Pulled Apart by Horses, Chew Lips, Joe Allen Band, Calories, Mike Heron, The Candyskins, Disasteradio, Detroit Social Club, Panama Kings, KTB, Danny and the Champions of the World, Gabriel Minnikin, Holton's Opulent Oog, Nervous Test Pilot, Jali Fily Cissokho, Andrew Ferris and Ruth Minnikin & Her Bandwagon. Dial F for Frankenstein (an unsigned Oxford band) were the opening act in the Cow-Shed on the Saturday and were met by a huge turn out, the On the Sunday Rock Sound magazine and Bob Harris hosted the barn-stage and the solar-powered market stage respectively. A secret set was played by Frank Turner on the Sunday night, under the name Funk Tanker.

==== Truck stage ====
Saturday 25 July	Sunday 26 July
Ash; Damo Suzuki; Red Light Company; Vieux Farka Touré; Wintersleep; Hjaltalín; Fanfarlo; Detroit Social Club; Panama Kings	Supergrass; Stars of Track and Field; The Candyskins; Dive Dive; The Long Insiders; The Epstein; Jali Fily Cissokho; Alphabet Backwards; The Relationships; ute

Tickets for Truck 12 cost £70 for the weekend with day tickets costing £40 each.

=== Truck Thirteen ===
Truck Thirteen took place over three days on 23–25 July, and was being headlined by Mew and Teenage Fanclub, and also featured Los Campesinos!, Thomas Truax, Blood Red Shoes, 65daysofstatic, Bellowhead, DJ Zinc and Ms. Dynamite, Fucked Up, Stornoway and a special appearance from Mercury Rev performing a live soundtrack to Kenneth Anger's occult movie Lucifer Rising, which was originally soundtracked by Bobby Beausoleil.

Tickets cost £80 for the weekend, with an additional £15 charge if the attendee wished to camp on the Friday night.

=== Truck Fourteen ===
For the first time running over a full three days, 2011's festival also introduced a second stage curated by three record labels: Transgressive, Heavenly, and Bella Union. The line-up features Gruff Rhys, Bellowhead, Graham Coxon, Saint Etienne, John Grant, Philip Selway, Edwyn Collins, The Go! Team, Johnny Flynn, as well as dozens of other acts.

Weekend tickets cost £99, and day tickets cost £40 for Friday and £45 for Saturday and Sunday.

=== Truck Fifteen ===
In January 2012 it was announced that Truck would return in 2012 under new management. The sold-out event took place on 20–21 July.

==== Main stage ====
Saturday 20 July	Sunday 21 July
Mystery Jets; Tim Minchin; Villagers; Clock Opera; Fixers; Federation of the Disco Pimp; Vadoinmessico; Michele Stodart; Gabriel Minnikin	The Temper Trap; British Sea Power; The Low Anthem; 65daysofstatic; Emmy the Great; Dog Is Dead; Kill It Kid; Black Hats; Co-Pilgrim; Yellow Fever

==== Second stage ====
Saturday 20 July	Sunday 21 July
Guillemots; Little Comets; Theme Park; The Dreaming Spires; Josh Kumra; Boat To Row; The Hi & Lo; Kill Murray; Old Grinding Young; Jess Hall	Frightened Rabbit; King Charles; Lucy Rose; Man Like Me; This Town Needs Guns; The Last Republic; Trevor Moss & Hannah-Lou; ToLiesel; Pixel Fix; Robots With Souls

==== Barn stage ====
Saturday 20 July	Sunday 21 July
Future of the Left; Turbowolf; Brontide; Spring Offensive; Delta Alaska; John J Presley; Dead Jerichos; Poledo; Fine Union; Lost Dogs	Three Trapped Tigers; Johnny Foreigner; Tall Ships; Tellison; Gunning for Tamar; Crash of Rhinos; My First Tooth; Flights of Helios; Dubwiser; Very Nice Harry; The See See

== Truck Records ==
Truck Records was an independent record label based in Oxford, England. It grew out of the Truck Festival, held annually in Steventon, Oxfordshire. The festival and label were started (in 1998 and 1999 respectively) by the Bennett family, two of whom formed the band The Dreaming, and were members of Goldrush.

Past and present artists on Truck Records include Goldrush, The Electric Soft Parade, MC Lars, Trademark, The Rock of Travolta, Meanwhile, Back in Communist Russia…, Black Nielson, Four Storeys, Fonda 500, The Black Madonnas, The Schla La Las and Piney Gir.

In 2005, the label was the subject of the Channel 4 documentary "The Business: Business or Pleasure". The documentary covered the business's financial problems alongside the employees' motivation and love of the music industry.

== See also ==
- List of electronic music festivals
