= Yijia Tu =

Chinese singer-songwriter and public speaker (born 1997)

- 涂议嘉
- Born: 8 November 1997 (age 28); Shichuan, China
- Education: SOAS University of London; St John's College, Oxford
- Occupations: Singer-songwriter, musician
- Years active: 2014–present
- Musical career
- Instruments: Guitar, Guzheng, Tuvan throat singing

Yijia Tu (Chinese: 涂议嘉; born 8 November 1997) is a Chinese singer-songwriter and public speaker.

She was celebrated in China after placing in the top three of singing competition Sing My Song (中国好歌曲 第一季), an open contest for songwriters to sing their own compositions. Her music drew praise from both judges and audience. After graduating from high school with a certificate in composition, Yijia released her debut album '17' via Sony Music in collaboration with Chinese and internationally acclaimed musicians including Grammy winner Luca Bignardi, Liu Huan, and the China Philharmonic Orchestra; the album won 'Media's Choice Award' at the 2015 Chinese Music Awards.

Yijia moved to the United Kingdom to pursue academic study of medieval English music, founding The Sages (竹林七贤, named after Seven Sages of the Bamboo Grove) with Peadar Connolly-Davey, quickly finding an audience for Chinese traditional music via BBC Radio 3 and other national broadcast media.

== Advocating for representation of Chinese music in Western music promotion ==
Attending WOMAD Festival in 2019 Yijia noted the absence of Chinese music on the lineup, and decided on this basis to pursue a dissertation with St John's College, Oxford exploring the reasons for this. Activities undertaken during this study led to her being booked for 2022 (to sing & play guzheng as part of orchestra "Cheng Yu & Silk Breeze") leading Oli Steadman to bring his fellow members of Stornoway to view the performance. Impressed & moved by Yijia's individual vocal performance, they invited her to collaborate on their forthcoming album, and ultimately tour together during the band's Autumn 2023 comeback tour.

Yijia now performs regularly in the UK including as a part of cultural showcases of Chinese music and Yi cultural identity, and collaborates with recording artists. She gave a TEDx talk in Brighton which led to being booked for the annual TED Conference for April 2025. Shortly after giving this talk, Yijia announced fortchoming album "Tu". Inspired by the traditional Indigenous music of the Yi ethnic minority group from the Southwestern part of China, it would include traditional East Asian music alongside original song ‘Willow Flowers’ (winner of the Oxford University Mapleton-Bree Prize).

== Discography ==
- Tu (2025)
- It's Not Up To You with Stornoway (band) (2023)
- Rotten Bun For An Eggless Century with Mui Zyu (2023)
- Anyway, Still with Exit North (2023)
- Chinese Whisperer (2023)
