= BBC Music Introducing =

BBC brand for promoting new music

- Website type: Music upload platform (UGC)
- Owner: BBC Music
- Website: Official website
- Launched: June 2007; 19 years ago
- Current status: Active

BBC Music Introducing is BBC Radio's platform supporting unsigned, undiscovered, and under-the-radar UK music talent. The backbone of that network consists of 32 BBC local radio shows on stations across England and the Channel Islands, various network shows in Wales, Scotland and Northern Ireland, which also give artists the opportunity to be played nationally on Radio 1, 1Xtra, Radio 2, Radio 3, 6 Music and Asian Network, as well as playing Introducing stages at festivals such as Glastonbury, Reading and Leeds, South by Southwest, Latitude Festival and BBC Radio 1's Big Weekend.

Those 32 shows air every Saturday night, featuring local artists with airplay, interviews and sessions. They try to provide local gigs, festival stages and outside broadcasts whenever possible - and to forward their discoveries to sister shows on local and national BBC stations for further airplay.

Since launching in June 2007, the Introducing platform has helped launch the careers of George Ezra, Jack Garratt, Florence and the Machine, Ed Sheeran, Ellie Goulding, Becky Hill, Jake Bugg, Izzy Bizu, Catfish and the Bottlemen, James Bay, 220 Kid and Little Simz.

== History ==
BBC Music Introducing was launched in 2007 as by this period, many BBC local radio stations had launched a weekly local music show to share and champion local artists. As shows such as The Box Office on BBC Three Counties Radio, The Download on BBC Radio Oxford, The Friday Session on BBC Hereford and Worcester, Raw Talent on BBC Radio Humberside, The Weekender on BBC Radio Nottingham and South Live on BBC Southern Counties Radio proved popular there was interest in developing a more coherent structure and brand for new music on the BBC. These shows soon turned into the earliest BBC Music Introducing shows.

In September 2010, all BBC local unsigned music shows that had not renamed themselves as part of 'Introducing' were re-branded. In 2010 BBC Music Introducing was awarded the best new platform to discover music at the BT Digital Music Awards. In May 2011, BBC Music Introducing won the Gold award for Best Use of Multiplatform at the Sony Radio Academy Awards.

Since 5 January 2013, every BBC Local Radio station across England and the Channel Islands broadcasts a BBC Music Introducing programme at 8pm on Saturday evenings. It also broadcasts on BBC Radio Wales on Saturdays, BBC Radio Scotland on Fridays and BBC Radio Ulster in Northern Ireland on Monday nights. There are more than 190,000 registered artists and nearly 1 million (950,000+) tracks uploaded to the BBC Music Introducing website, who get played weekly across Introducing shows on BBC radio, with each station reflecting its local music scene around the country. Most weeks, the platform receives in excess of 5,000 tracks with some peaking at 16,000 - representing 1073 hours of new music being sent into the BBC.

On Wednesday 4 October 2017, BBC Music Introducing celebrated its tenth birthday by holding a four-hour gig at the O2 Academy Brixton which was live on BBC Radio 1 and hosted by Annie Mac and Huw Stephens. Introducing alumni including George Ezra, Nao, Everything Everything, The Big Moon, Declan McKenna, Slaves, Rae Morris, Blossoms and Jake Bugg performed at the live showcase. South London grime artist Yizzy also performed on the night, and was the winner of Introducing's Future Fund – an artist grant launched in partnership with PRS for Music Foundation.

On Saturday 7 and Sunday 8 October, BBC Music Introducing hosted Amplify – a mass-scale conference composed of masterclasses, workshops and performances at ExCeL London. It featured talks from key figures in the music industry including Huw Stephens, Steve Lamacq, Jamie Cullum, Twin B, Annie Mac, DJ Target and Jo Whiley. The event subsequently continued in 2018 named 'BBC Introducing Live' taking place at Tobacco Dock in London.

The BBC broadcasts 32 local shows across their network each week, with plans to cut them down to 20 regional shows - up from the original 10, confirmed in February 2023.

== Successes ==
The earliest success stories include Florence and The Machine, who Introducing took to Texas in 2008 to play at SXSW festival, Two Door Cinema Club in 2009, later headlined Glastonbury on the next year; Ed Sheeran who played Glastonbury Festival for the first time in 2011 on the BBC Introducing stage.

Introducing has also helped push the careers of the likes of Two Door Cinema Club, Marina and The Diamonds, Ellie Goulding, The 1975, Chip/Chipmunk, Låpsley, JME & Skepta, Rizzle Kicks, Stornoway, Alt-J, TCTS, Wretch 32, Ward Thomas, Gabrielle Aplin, Years & Years, Circa Waves, Saint Raymond, Don Broco, AlunaGeorge, Becky Hill, Devlin, The Ting Tings, Will Heard, Moko, KStewart, Mama ft. Antonella, The Sherlocks, London Grammar, Oh Wonder, Fickle Friends, The Amazons, The Shires, Aquilo, Nothing But Thieves, Jacob Collier, Jerry Williams, Matt Maltese, Jordan Max, IDER, Glass Animals and Pulled Apart By Horses.

In 2014 and 2015, BBC Music Introducing was an entry route to the UK's selection process for the Eurovision Song Contest, with Molly Smitten-Downes being chosen for the 2014 competition. The UK’s entry in 2023 had previously been supported by the network, in October 2024 it was announced that BBC Introducing would be used to source the UK entry for 2025 this has continued into 2026-7.

In March 2022, BBC Introducing on Asian Network with Jasmine Takhar was nominated for best radio show at the Music Week Awards.

== The platform ==
=== Radio network coverage ===
The 32 Introducing shows on BBC local radio are a hub to showcase the wealth of new music being discovered across the locality. From here, artists are forwarded to BBC DJs to play on national radio, and they can also be put forward to play festival stages by their local show. Every week the BBC Radio 1 and 1Xtra music teams feature an Introducing artist on their playlists. Previous Introducing artists of the week have included Tom Grennan, The Sherlocks, The Big Moon, Mahalia, Willie J Healey, Isaac Gracie, Declan McKenna, Pale Waves, Shy Luv, Mullally, Isaiah Dreads and Alicai Harley.

=== Upload tool ===
In February 2009, an upload tool (now internally referred to as Peel, named after the late John Peel) was launched on the BBC Music Introducing website to allow users to upload their music direct to Introducing producers and presenters. Artists or bands enter their postcode at the point of registering and notifications about any songs they upload are sent to BBC staff working on their nearest Introducing radio show, which can then be forwarded to the likes of BBC Radio 1, Radio 2, Radio 3, BBC 6 Music, BBC Radio 1Xtra or BBC Asian Network.

All material submitted to the BBC Music Introducing brand via the upload tool is classified by the BBC as User Generated Content (UGC), and they encourage users to read the Corporation's Terms of Use in relation to UGC before uploading material.

== Festival stages ==
BBC Music Introducing has hosted a stage at festivals since 2007. In the last ten years Introducing has been present at Glastonbury Festival, Reading and Leeds Festivals, Latitude Festival, T in the Park, Radio 1's Big Weekend, Cheltenham Jazz Festival, Reeperbahn, 6 Music Live, Winter Jazzfest in New York, South by Southwest and more.

In 2017 BBC Music Introducing was present at Creamfields and the Amsterdam Dance Event (ADE), focusing solely on DJs and electronic acts for the first time.

Previous acts to have played the Introducing stages include Jack Garratt, Ed Sheeran, George Ezra, Bombay Bicycle Club, Little Simz, Blossoms, Loyle Carner, Slaves, Rosie Lowe, Glass Animals, Soak, Viola Beach, Catfish and the Bottlemen, James Bay, Royal Blood and CHVRCHES.

== Artist of the Year Award ==
BBC Music Introducing Artist of the Year Award
- Awarded for: Significant impact (with aid from the platform)
- Country: United Kingdom
- Presented by: BBC Music (formerly at BBC Music Awards)
- First award: 2014; 12 years ago
- Currently held by: Jacob Alon (2025)
- Website: Official website

Organised between 2014 and 2017, the BBC Music Awards celebrated the best in British music. Since the inaugural awards ceremony, the BBC Music Introducing Artist of the Year award has been presented to an artist who has made a significant impact with the aid of BBC Music Introducing. The award has continued following the end of the music awards.

=== Winners ===
The winners are:

- 2014 – Catfish and the Bottlemen
- 2015 – Jack Garratt
- 2016 – Izzy Bizu
- 2017 – Declan McKenna
- 2018 – Tom Grennan
- 2019 – Celeste
- 2020 – Arlo Parks
- 2021 – Self Esteem
- 2022 – Nia Archives
- 2023 – Olivia Dean
- 2024 – Myles Smith
- 2025 – Jacob Alon

== Programmes and presenters ==
=== National programmes ===
- BBC Introducing on Radio 1 Dance (presented by Jaguar)
- BBC Introducing on Radio 1 (presented by Jess Iszatt)
- BBC Introducing Rock on Radio 1 (presented by Alyx Holcombe)
- The BBC Introducing Mixtape (presented by Emily Pilbeam on BBC Radio 6 Music)
- BBC Introducing on Asian Network (with Jasmine Takhar)
- BBC Introducing on 1Xtra (with Theo Johnson)

=== Country-specific ===
- BBC Music Introducing with Adam Walton (BBC Radio Wales)
- BBC Music Introducing with Bethan Elfyn (BBC Radio Wales)
- BBC Music Introducing in Scotland (presented by Phoebe I-H and Shereen Cutkelvin)
- BBC Music Introducing/Across the Line (radio show) in Northern Ireland (presented by Gemma Bradley)

=== Local and regional programmes ===
- BBC Music Introducing in Beds, Herts & Bucks (presented by Honor Morrison)
- BBC Music Introducing in Cambridgeshire (presented by Rebecca May)
- BBC Music Introducing in the Channel Islands (presented by Tim Hunter)
- BBC Music Introducing in Coventry & Warwickshire (presented by Brody Swain)
- BBC Music Introducing in Cumbria (presented by Emma Linton)
- BBC Music Introducing in the East Midlands (presented by Dean Jackson)
- BBC Music Introducing in Essex (presented by Jake Peach)
- BBC Music Introducing in Hereford & Worcester (presented by Andrew Marston on Saturdays and Lizzie Crow on Sundays)
- BBC Music Introducing in Humberside (presented by Alan Raw)
- BBC Music Introducing in Kent (presented by Casey Dale)
- BBC Music Introducing in Lancashire (presented by William Wolstenholme)
- BBC Music Introducing in Lincolnshire (presented by George Smith)
- BBC Music Introducing in London (presented by Jess Iszatt)
- BBC Music Introducing in Manchester (presented by Roesh)
- BBC Music Introducing in Merseyside (presented by Dave Monks)
- BBC Music Introducing in Norfolk (presented by Kitty Perrin)
- BBC Music Introducing in the North East (presented by Nick Roberts)
- BBC Music Introducing in Northampton (presented by Kerrie Cosh)
- BBC Introducing in Oxfordshire (presented by Dave Gilyeat)
- BBC Music Introducing in Sheffield (presented by Christian Carlisle)
- BBC Music Introducing in Shropshire (presented by Michaela Wylde and Simon Berry on Saturdays and Lizzie Crow on Sundays)
- BBC Music Introducing: Solent (presented by Steph Nieuwenhuys)
- BBC Music Introducing in The South West (presented by Daniel Pascoe)
- BBC Music Introducing in Stoke (presented by Rob Adcock)
- BBC Introducing in Suffolk (presented by Angelle Joseph)
- BBC Music Introducing in Sussex & Surrey (presented by Melita Dennett)
- BBC Music Introducing in Tees (presented by Shakk)
- BBC Music Introducing in The West (presented by James Threlfall)
- BBC Music Introducing in the West Midlands (presented by Theo Johnson)
- BBC Music Introducing in West Yorkshire (presented by Emily Pilbeam)
- BBC Music Introducing in York and North Yorkshire (presented by Jericho Keys)
