= Beachcomber's Windowsill =

Studio album by Stornoway
- Released: 24 May 2010
- Genre: Indie rock, indie folk, chamber pop
- Label: 4AD
- Producer: Brian Briggs and Jonathan Ouin

Stornoway chronology
Beachcomber's Windowsill (2010)	Tales from Terra Firma (2013)

Singles from Beachcomber's Windowsill
- 1. "Zorbing" Released: July 2009; 2. "I Saw You Blink" Released: 22 March 2010; 3. "Zorbing (re-release)"

Professional ratings
Review scores
Source	Rating
All Music	3.5/5 stars
God Is In The TV	5/5 stars
Drowned in Sound	(7/10)
The Guardian	4/5 stars
The Independent	2/5 stars
NME	(8/10)
The Times	4/5 stars

Beachcomber's Windowsill is the debut album by Stornoway. The title is that of an early, unreleased song by the band. It was released on 24 May 2010 on the 4AD label. It entered the UK Album Chart at number 14 and received silver certification for sales in the UK (silver certification is awarded for the sales of 60,000).

== Singles ==
- Zorbing was released as the first single of Beachcomber's Windowsill, however it failed to chart in the UK Official top 200. It was self-released by the band and a music video was released on YouTube. The unofficial video, home-made by the band with help from friend Hilary O'Hare, reached 1,000,000 views in October 2012.
- I Saw You Blink was released as the second single from Beachcomber's Windowsill, and again, the music video featured on YouTube. The single debuted at number 119, becoming the band's first single to chart in the UK top 150, 'I Saw You Blink' also charted at number 12 on the UK Indie Chart.
- Zorbing was re-released as a single and charted at number 74, as well as number 11 in Belgium, it also charted at number 4 on the UK Indie Chart.

== Critical reception ==
The album received generally positive reviews; however, The Independent gave the album a below-average score 2 stars out of 5.

== Track listing ==
1. "Zorbing" (3:30)
2. "I Saw You Blink" (3:50)
3. "Fuel Up" (4:20)
4. "The Coldharbour Road" (4:28)
5. "Boats and Trains" (4:19)
6. "We Are the Battery Human" (4:01)
7. "Here Comes the Blackout...!" (2:03)
8. "Watching Birds" (3:23)
9. "On the Rocks" (4:49)
10. "The End of the Movie" (4:20)
11. "Long-Distance Lullaby" (4:17)

== "Live 7" single ==
Early versions of the album sold at some Independent Music stores in the UK also included a 7" vinyl single containing two live versions of tracks from the album recorded at the Sheldonian Theatre in Oxford on 30 October 2009.

1. Side A: "We Are The Battery Human"
2. Side B: "On The Rocks (Feat. The Oxford Millennium Orchestra)"
