= Charlotte Glasson =

British musician

- Glasson in 2024

Background information
- Born: 1 March 1973 (age 53); London, England
- Occupation: Musician
- Instrument: Multi-instrumentalist

Charlotte Glasson (born 1 March 1973) in London, England is a British bandleader, composer, multi-instrumentalist, and session musician.

== Early life ==
Charlotte started playing the violin at the age of five, got a guitar when she was seven and taught herself how to play Beatle tunes, and then got a saxophone for Christmas when she was 12. Charlotte went on to study Music at Kingston University, after which she progressed into a career as a session musician, bandleader and composer/arranger.

== Career ==
Glasson plays jazz, classical music, blues, soul, funk, Latin, country and everything in between. She has composed music for an Art Installation at The Ashmolean Museum in Oxford with Chinese Artist Qu Leilei, and music for theatre performances by George Dillon. She leads the Charlotte Glasson Band, who perform her compositions along with those of the band. Glasson has played with Roxy Music and is also part of the band of Camille O'Sullivan. She has been a member of Three Friends, a progressive rock band who perform the music of Gentle Giant, and was a regular of the cast for The Lost and Found Orchestra. She is touring as a member of The Waeve and appears on the "City Lights Sessions (Live)" album. Glasson is a regular member of Stornoway (band) and appears on Beyonder (album), playing Saxophone and Violin.
