= Stornoway (band) =

British indie folk band

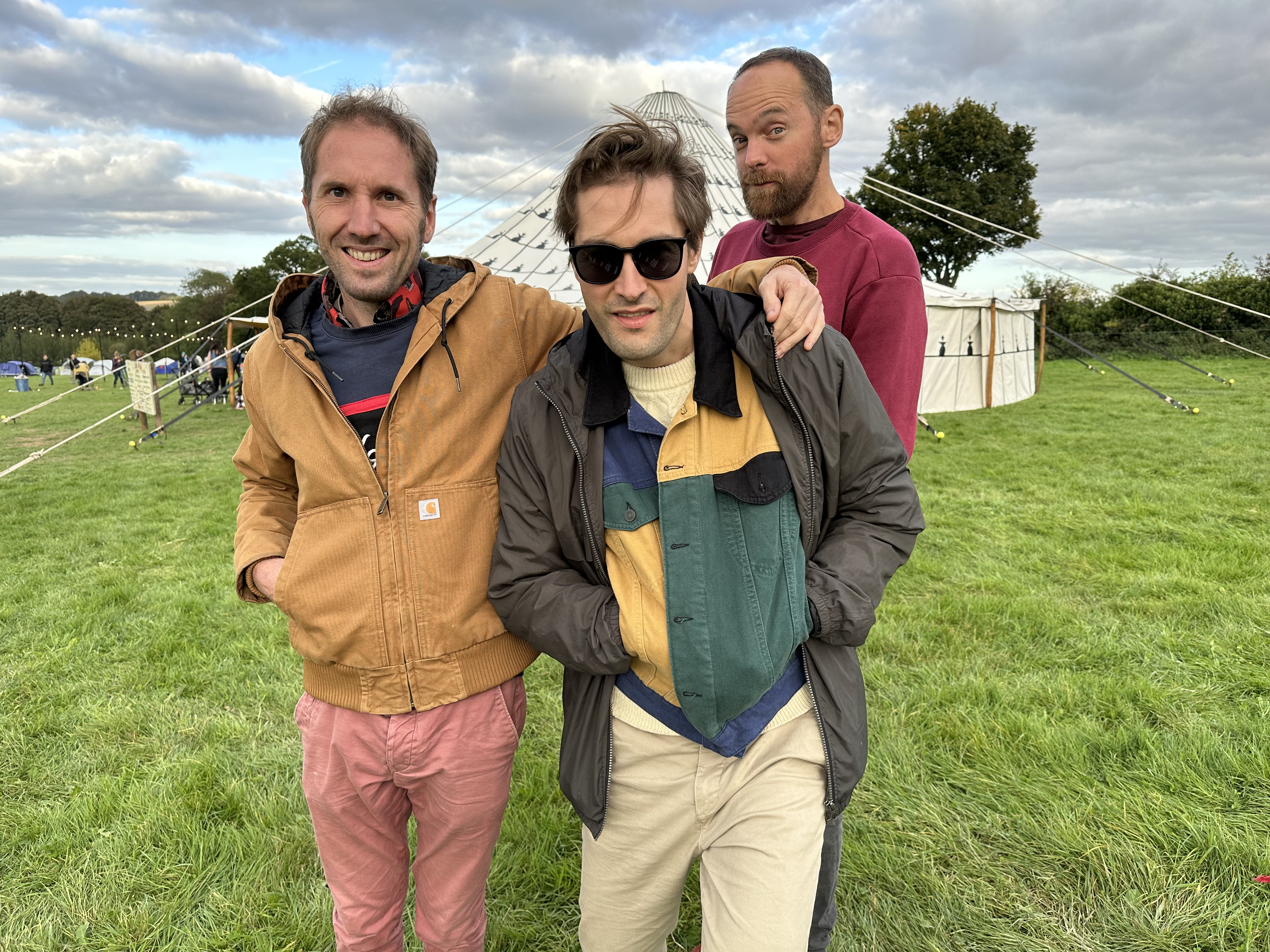

Background information
- Origin: Oxford, Oxfordshire, England
- Genres: Indie folk, indie rock, chamber pop, britpop
- Years active: 2006–2017, 2022–present
- Labels: Cooking Vinyl, 4AD
- Members: Brian Briggs; Jonathan Ouin; Oli Steadman
- Website: Official website

Stornoway are a British indie folk band from Cowley in Oxford, led by ornithologist Brian Briggs as singer and main songwriter, with multi-instrumentalists Jon Ouin and Oli Steadman.

Their sound incorporates an ever-changing selection of stringed instruments and keyboards, supported by a typical pop backline of guitar, drums and bass guitar, embellished with avant-garde percussion including DIY hardware (saw & axe), cutlery, and Welsh gravel. The trio typically performs live with additional musicians including Thomas E Hodgson on trumpet and percussion; Susie Attwood on violin and percussion; Charlotte Glasson on violin, percussion, saxophone and flute; Felix Higginbottom on drums, percussion and backing vocals; and Adam Briggs on trumpet and percussion.

The band is named after the Scottish town of Stornoway on the Hebridean Isle of Lewis, having never been to Stornoway when they decided to name themselves after the town. They have since visited multiple times, the first expedition comprising a performance on 9 April 2010 and the signing of their recording contract with label 4AD. They have explained "We were looking in books about knots and [...] guides to natural history of the seashore [...] this [Stornoway] was the only one that stuck, and it was reinforced by the fact that if you see the BBC weather forecast, Stornoway is up there... so we get this wonderful free promotion every time there's a weather report".

Starting with Dig The Mountain! (and subsequent reissues of Beachcomber's Windowsill & Tales From Terra Firma as well as 2026 album Beyonder), the band have released their music chiefly on recycled materials and packaged in sustainable card packaging. They are informally linked to many nature conservation trusts including BBOWT, HIWWT, RSPB, Wildfowl & Wetlands Trust, British Trust for Ornithology, and the Woodland Trust. They have also pioneered economic sustainability in local music scenees, particularly their hometown of Oxford (by performing in alternative performance spaces), and particularly with reference to birds & birdsong.

== Music career ==
=== 2005–2010: Early Adventures and other EPs ===
Stornoway's first radio play came in March 2006 with a demo version of "I Saw You Blink" on BBC Oxford Introducing. Radio presenter Tim Bearder was an early champion of the band and was suspended from work after barricading himself in the studio and playing an hour of Stornoway songs from their demo EP The Early Adventures of Stornoway, which had been positively reviewed by local scene mag Nightshift. That collection of 5 demos was followed by a further 2 self-released EPs: Letters From Lewis (2007), and On The Rocks (2008). They headlined the inaugural Wood Festival the same year.

A 2009 appearance at Radio 1's Big Weekend (Lydiard Park, Swindon) led to more festivals later that year (including six sets at Glastonbury festival 2009) documented in a weekly column authored by Jon for UK national press. On 1 September they played a free concert at Tate Modern, London, supported by Reverend and the Makers, launching the 10:10 climate change campaign.

2nd single "Unfaithful" was launched on 21 September at the Institute of Contemporary Arts in London. Their first UK tour took place from 16 to 30 October 2009, culminating in a concert at Oxford's Sheldonian Theatre, accompanied by the Oxford Millennium Orchestra. They were the first non-classical group ever to play in the centuries-old building.

In November 2009 Stornoway became the first-ever unsigned band to appear on Later... with Jools Holland, and performed alongside Sting, Norah Jones, Jay-Z, and Foo Fighters. The attention gained by this appearance led to tens of thousands of views of their homemade YouTube videos, and the band were playlisted on the BBC's national radio stations. In December 2009, Stornoway were announced as entrants onto the longlist of the BBC's Sound of 2010 competition, having been selected by a panel of some 165 UK-based tastemakers. They toured Scotland and Ireland in March 2010 (dubbed the Highlands, Islands and Ireland tour), and signed their record deal in the castle grounds at Lews in Stornoway, after playing in their namesake town for the first time.

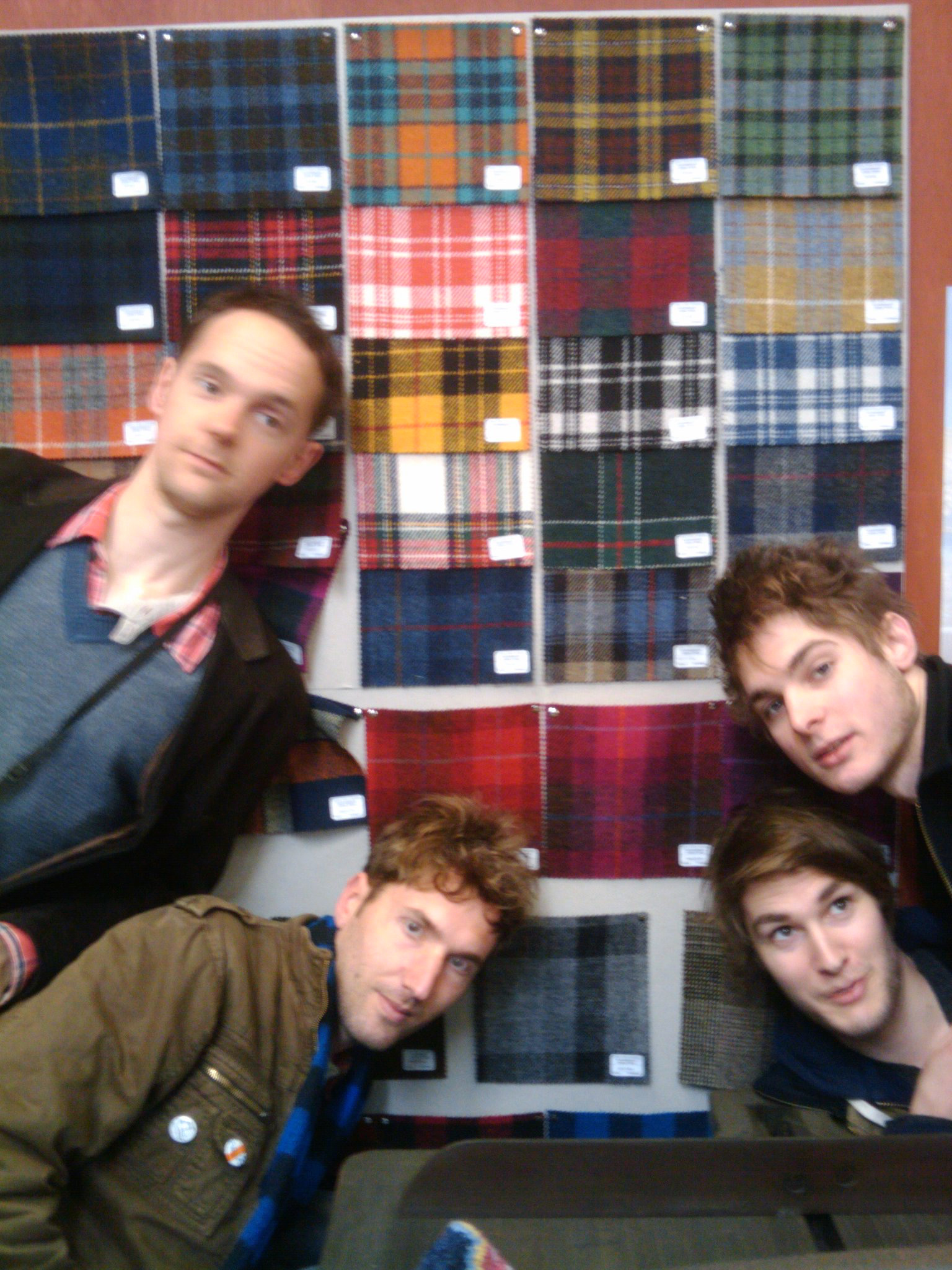
Stornoway visiting the Harris Tweed factory on Lewis during their Highlands Islands & Ireland Tour

=== 2010–2012: Beachcomber's Windowsill ===
Signing to independent record label 4AD, on 22 March 2010 they released 3rd single "I Saw You Blink". Debut album Beachcomber's Windowsill launched on 24 May. Brian Briggs said in December 2010 that any initial apprehension to signing to a label has since faded: "we were used to doing it our own way. We'd put out EPs ourselves in Oxford and we were used to being the decision makers on everything. Having never worked with a label before, we were nervous that it would mean we would lose some say or having people twisting our arms doing certain things. And 4AD convinced us that wouldn't be the case and that we would have creative control over everything and they were supportive of that and it's worked really well so far, and they've stayed true to that."

The band organised three small shows to 300 hometown fans at Oxford's A1 Pool Hall in Summer 2010. On 30 May, Beachcomber's Windowsill entered the UK Albums Chart at number 14, spending five weeks in the UK Top 100. An "unplugged" session of four songs was recorded for 4AD at the Rotunda, an abandoned doll's house museum in Iffley Village, Oxford in August 2010. They played at Glastonbury Festival 2010 and Womad Charlton Park in July 2010, along with main-stage slots at a great number of UK and European festivals. The rest of the year saw the band tour England, North America and, in February 2011, Australia as part of the St Jerome's Laneway Festival. Their last performance in their home country for 2010 was in London at the Shepherd's Bush Empire, to a sold-out crowd of 2,000, their biggest headline audience to date. The band performed the music from Beachcomber's Windowsill with extensions and additions to the instrumentation for many songs; in addition one older song and two new ones were performed, including two unplugged performances with acoustic instruments. Beachcomber's Windowsill won Album Of The Year at the 2010 XFM New Music Awards.

Capitalising on a brief visit made during mid-2010, in December the band undertook their first formal tour of the USA including a visit to Peabody Museum of Natural History touring with Head and the Heart (which would later lead to a return in May 2011 with Sea Of Bees, and again in May 2013 with Horse Thief).

Following the second German tour and their first performances in Italy, Luxembourg and Switzerland, Stornoway spent early 2011 at home in Oxford writing towards their second album. In April they announced a return to Glastonbury for the third year in a row to open the Pyramid Stage on Saturday 25 June. Returning to America in May 2011, they would then spend the rest of the year performing at home in the UK and recording in Oxford, after a homecoming concert for summer 2011 at London's Somerset House on Saturday 9 July with orchestral backing from North Sea Radio Orchestra. A secret Somerset House warm-up show, with support from Dry The River, was announced in April. The band's first concert in Oxford since November 2010 was held at the Regal, Cowley Road, on Saturday 3 September 2011 alongside fellow Oxford bands The Epstein and Dreaming Spires. Proceeds from the evening, as well those for an auctioned-off Epiphone S-210 signed by all members of the band, went to the Sumatran Orangutan Society, Earth Trust, and RSPB. Other charity fundraising from the period include releasing song "You Don't Know Anything" in aid of BBOWT, and two contributions to BBC Oxford Introducing's local music scene copmilations (both in aid of Children In Need).

=== 2012–2013: Tales from Terra Firma ===
On 19 November 2012 Stornoway announced the release of their second album, Tales from Terra Firma, which was released on 11 March 2013, after spending most of 2012 recording. The album's lead single "Knock Me on the Head" premiered for radio on 1 January, premiered to video in late February, and was released alongside the album on 11 March.

Tales From Terra Firma entered the UK Albums Chart at number 26, receiving generally positive reviews from critics, with the Guardian giving the album a 5-star rating.

=== 2013: You Don't Know Anything ===
In September 2013, Stornoway announced a surprise mini-album You Don't Know Anything, containing outtakes from the Terra Firma album, to be made available exclusively to fans in time for their UK tour to close a successful year. The album was streamed exclusively by AllMusic, following free downloads of lead single "Tumbling Bay" by Rolling Stone and BBC 6 Music's Lauren Laverne in November. The band received some of their first reviews from music specialist magazines Uncut and Q.

The EP was released 11 November, followed by a UK tour finishing at the Barbican Centre on 8 December.

=== 2014–2015: Bonxie ===
In June 2014, Stornoway launched through PledgeMusic a pre-order campaign which saw the band reach 222% of their target within 4 days (finally raising 513% by end of campaign). Fans purchased copies of the album alongside day-trips with the band to go zorbing or birdwatching. The campaign culminated in a return to Oxford's Sheldonian Theatre for two sold-out shows (again accompanied by the Oxford Millennium Orchestra), celebrating five years since their first appearance there, and photography for the release was provided by Gideon Mendel with whom Stornoway would go on to collaborate further, even composing soundtracks for his conservation-focussed gallery exhibitions. The album was released on 13 April 2015, entering the UK Albums Chart at number 20. On 21 April, the band embarked on a tour of the UK, including two sold-out shows at Islington Assembly Hall.

=== 2016–2017: Farewell tour and split ===
A steady stream of live performances continued into 2016 including four dates with Forestry Live, supporting Paul Heaton & Jacqui Abbott. However, in October the band announced that they would be splitting up. In a statement the band announced: "Today we bring you some sad news. After a whole decade of wonderful adventures together, we have decided to call it a day. Stornoway will become 'Stor-no-more'. Our friendship and love of music remains as strong as ever, but over the last couple of years the winds of change seem to have blown us all in different directions".

They conducted a farewell tour of the UK during spring 2017, and played their final public show on 12 March 2017.

=== 2022–2023: Reunion and Dig the Mountain! ===
The band reformed for sets at Truck Festival in Oxfordshire and WOMAD Charlton Park in July 2022. At this event Oli brought Brian and Jon to view the performance of Chinese musician Yijia Tu with whom he'd performed in 2017 and attended WOMAD 2019, and who was billed in 2022 to perform as part of orchestra "Cheng Yu & Silk Breeze". Moved to tears by Yijia's individual vocal performance, they invited her to collaborate on their forthcoming album and eventually tour together during the band's Autumn 2023 comeback tour, alongside other guests including Fyfe Dangerfield and Sam Lee. On 13 April 2023, the band announced via BBC Radio 6 their fourth studio album Dig the Mountain! would be released on 8 September 2023 followed by a tour of the UK and Ireland. The album entered the official UK Sales Chart in the top ten, their highest chart position on any release to date. Yijia starred in the band's music video for "It's Not Up To You" which premiered on 28 July in a live interview with author Robert Macfarlane. They toured and also played several major UK festivals including Moseley Folk & Arts, 2023 culminating in a performance at O2 Forum Kentish Town with Cor Meibion Gwalia to launch Christmas single "Excelsior", whose video featured Stornoway fan video contributions: singers stood in front of ash trees at various locations across the UK, singing along to the words of the song which is explicitly about Ash Dieback. The single saw Stornoway return to George Shilling as mixing engineer, with whom they'd mixed the majority of all tracks since 2011.

Follow-up tours were announced for February 2024 incorporating regional UK, for April 2024 incorporating mainland European touring, and for summer 2024 including Greenbelt festival, Wychwood, Wood, Beautiful Days, Glastonbury Festival 2024 (their 7th Glastonbury since 2009), as well as Deer Shed and a headline set at Love Trails Festival.

=== 2024–2025: Best of Unplucked ===
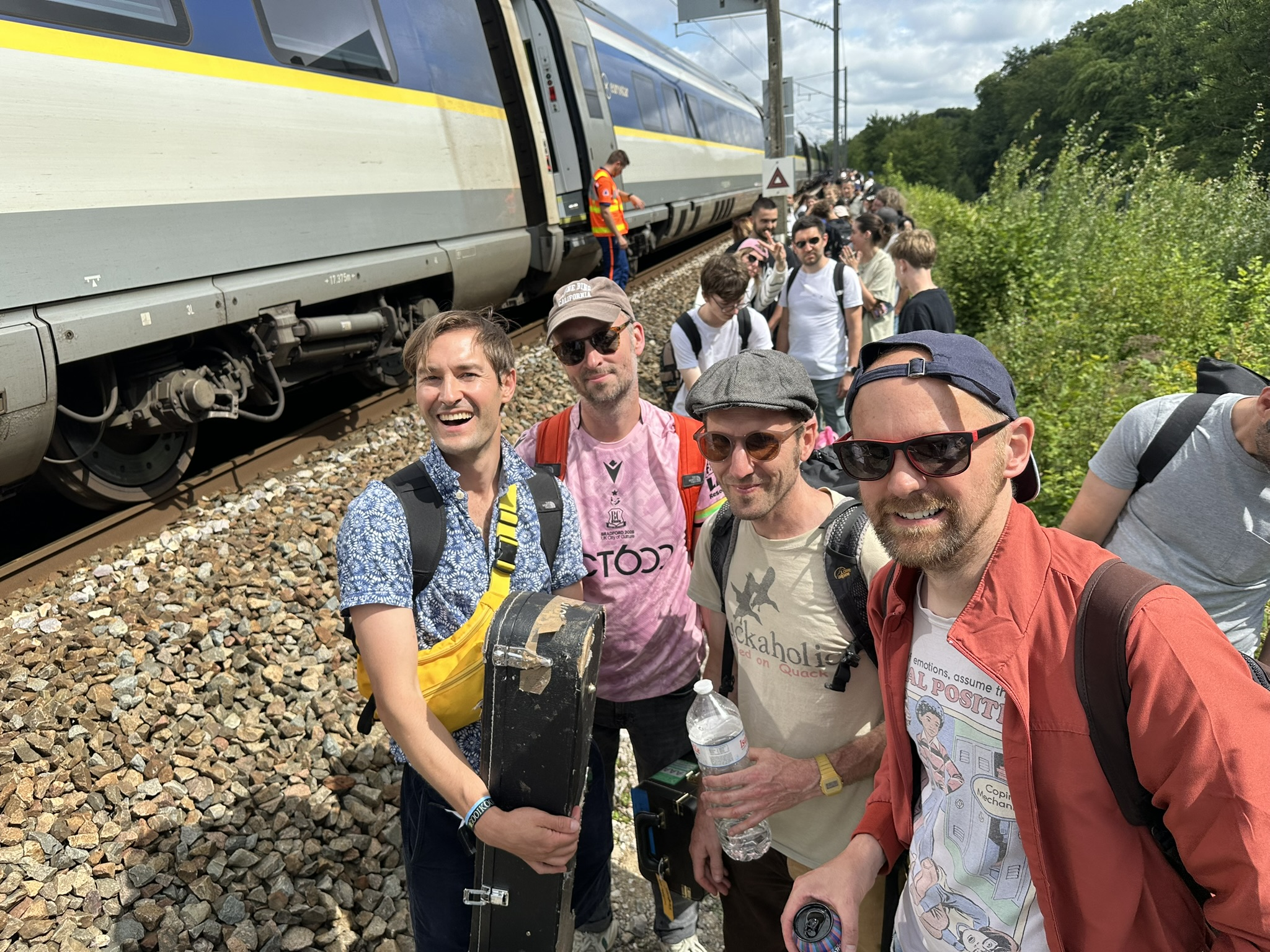
Stornoway and fellow passengers stranded by Eurostar in July 2025

Continuing to expand their ties to choral & classical influences, the band were joined on stage by the Vocal Spokes choir in May, before sharing news of a forthcoming rework of "Excelsior" in collaboration with composer Edward Nesbitt. Having shortly thereafter announced a run of concerts for 2025 including at the Manchester Folk Festival for English Folk Expo, they ended 2024 with a tour of churches culminating at the Union Chapel, Islington, to release "Best of Unplucked" as a collection of acoustic arrangements spanning their whole career to date.

The band announced a forthcoming appearance at the Royal Albert Hall for 30th March 2026. In July en route home from Gooikoorts festival in Belgium, a Eurostar service malfunctioned leaving hundreds of passengers stranded and prompting the band to improvise a live performance for travellers' entertainment.

=== 2026–2028: Beyonder ===
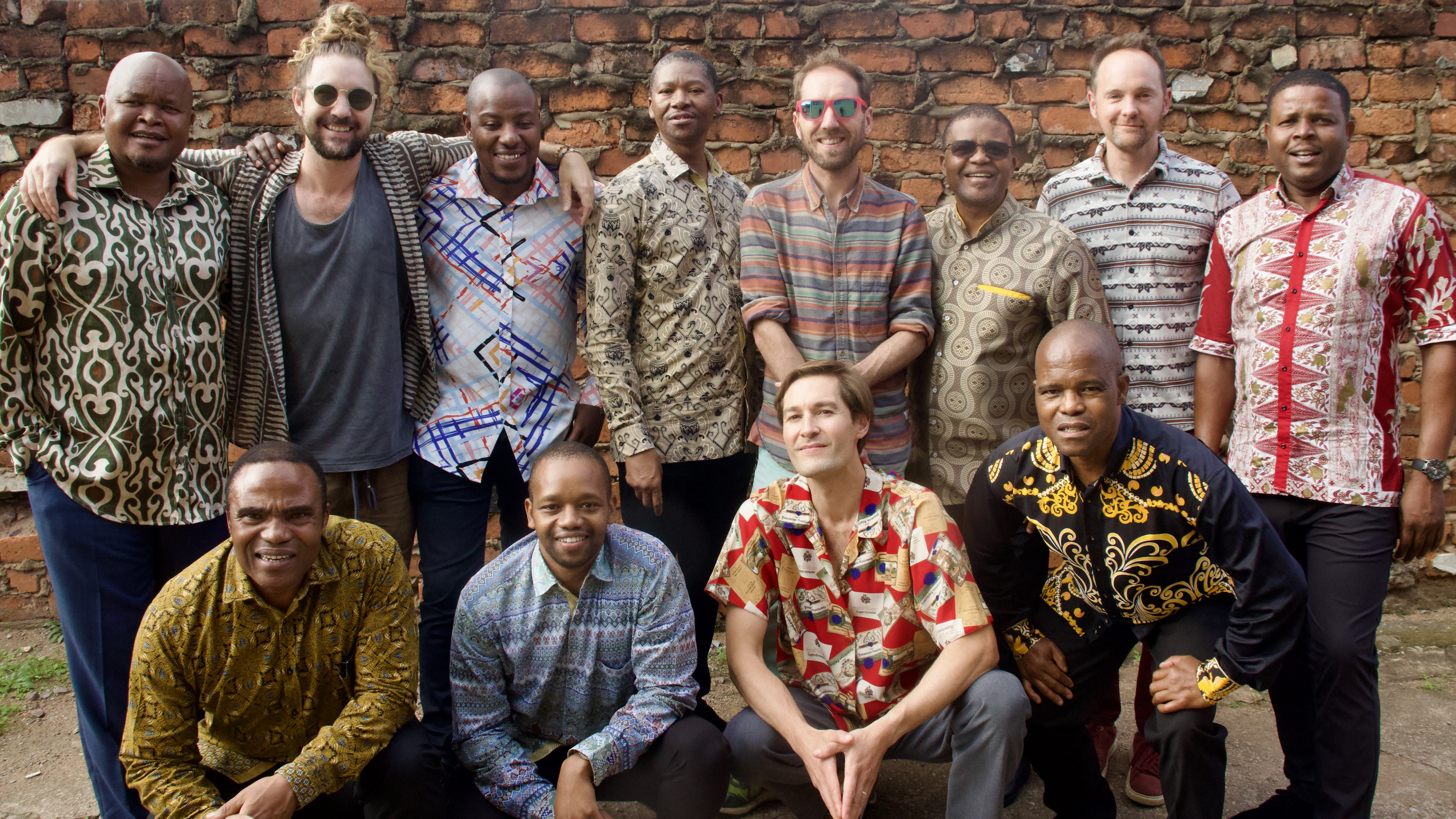
Stornoway with Ladysmith Black Mambazo in Durban, 30 May 2026. Standing (L to R): Pius Shezi, Jeremy Loops, Mfanafuthi Dlamini, Thamsanqa Shabalala, Brian Briggs, Sibongiseni Shabalala, Jon Ouin, Sabelo Mthembu. Seated (L to R): Thulani Shabalala, Gagamela Shabalala, Oli Steadman, Msizi Shabalala

On the day of their sold-out Royal Albert Hall performance, Stornoway announced forthcoming album Beyonder and released its first single "Marco Polo" which they performed during the concert alongside other new songs from the same collection ("River of Voices" and "Leave Your Light On"), as part of a soundscape recreating the rarest wildlife species & habitats. The Beyonder tour in October & February (with support from musician & field recordist Alice Boyd) would be preceded by headline festival slots including Beverley Folk, Compton, Norfolk & Norwich Festival, and Found Festival. During a live broadcast from Maida Vale Studios for Jo Whiley on BBC Radio 2 on 15 April they announced a MEGS-funded collaboration with Ladysmith Black Mambazo (this took place the following month), and debuted an arrangement of Sea of Love. Stornoway thus joined the select group of artists who have appeared on both a Live Lounge and a Sofa Session: Foo Fighters, Coldplay, Crowded House, James, The Flaming Lips, Arcade Fire, Bastille, Fontaines D.C. and Kate Nash (their 2010 Live Lounge appearance having featured an exclusive arrangement of Wiley's "Wearing My Rolex" — retitled "Wearing My Casio" and reworded to reference Whiley herself). On 22 April for Earth Day they premiered the music video for "Marco Polo" (again directed by Susie Attwood) in a live Q&A hosted by David Oakes. On 26 April they filmed an acoustic session with Folk On Foot, exploring biodiverse habitats across Gŵyr. The official launch concert for Beyonder and its songs inspired by tribal transformation myths would see the band returning to the Sheldonian to celebrate World Rivers Day with the creation of Oxford's largest ever scratch choir.

== Discography ==
=== Studio albums ===
List of studio albums, with selected details, chart positions and certifications
Title	Details	Peak chart positions						Certifications
Title	Details	UK Sales	UK Ind.	UK Downl.	UK Phys.	IRE	BEL (Fl)	Certifications
Beachcomber's Windowsill	Released: 24 May 2010; Label: 4AD; Formats: CD, digital download, vinyl	14	3	4	22	3	46	BPI: Silver
Tales from Terra Firma	Released: 11 March 2013; Label: 4AD; Formats: CD, digital download, vinyl	26	4	27	28	4	—	
Bonxie	Released: 13 April 2015; Label: Cooking Vinyl; Formats: CD, digital download, vinyl	20	5	31	16	—	—	
Dig the Mountain!	Released: 6 October 2023; Label: Cooking Vinyl; Formats: CD, digital download, vinyl	49	5	12	7	—	—	
Beyonder	Released: 25 September 2026; Label: Cooking Vinyl; Formats: CD, digital download, vinyl	—	—	—	—	—	—	
"—" denotes an album that did not chart or was not released.

=== Extended plays ===
List of extended plays, with selected details
Title	Details
iTunes Festival: London 2010	Released: 14 July 2010; Label: 4AD; Formats: Digital download
4AD Session	Released: 22 May 2011; Label: 4AD; Formats: Digital download

=== Singles ===
List of singles, with selected chart positions
Year	Single	Peak chart positions			Album
Year	Single	UK	UK Ind.	BEL (Fl)	Album
2009	"Zorbing"	—	—	—	Beachcomber's Windowsill
2009	"Unfaithful"	—	—	—	Non-album single
2010	"I Saw You Blink"	119	12	—	Beachcomber's Windowsill
2010	"Zorbing" (re-release)	74	4	61	Beachcomber's Windowsill
2013	"Knock Me on the Head"	—	—	—	Tales from Terra Firma
2023	"Trouble with the Green"	—	—	—	Dig the Mountain!
2023	"Bag in the Wind"	—	—	—	Dig the Mountain!
2023	"It's Not Up to You"	—	—	—	Dig the Mountain!
2023	"Excelsior" (Christmas version featuring Côr Meibion Gwalia)	—	—	—	Dig the Mountain!
2024	"Excelsior" (Edward Nesbit and Thomas Hodgon Rework)	—	—	—	Dig the Mountain!
2024	"Beachcomber's Windowsill" (2006 Demo)	—	—	—	The Early Adventures of Stornoway
2026	"Marco Polo"	—	—	—	Beyonder
2026	"Fire and Water"	—	—	—	Beyonder
2026	"The Book of Time"	—	—	—	Beyonder
"—" denotes a single that did not chart or was not released.

== Music videos ==
List of music videos, showing year released and director name
Year	Title	Director
2009	"Zorbing"	Hilary O'Hare
2009	"Unfaithful"	Gina Hood
2010	"I Saw You Blink"	Hilary O'Hare
2010	"Watching Birds"	James Caddick
2013	"Knock Me on the Head"	The Mitcham Submarine
2013	"Farewell, Appalachia!"	Matt Cooper feat. Made By Lung
2015	"Get Low"	Hilary O'Hare
2015	"Man On Wire"	Susie Attwood
2023	"Trouble With The Green"	Ben Giles
2023	"It's Not Up To You"	Susie Attwood
2023	"Excelsior"	Oli Steadman
2026	"Marco Polo"	Susie Attwood
