= Carterton Community College =

Location
- Upavon Way; Carterton, Oxfordshire, OX18 1BU; England; 51.7644°N 1.5978°W

Information
- Type: Community school
- Local authority: Oxfordshire
- Department for Education URN: 123236 Tables
- Ofsted: Reports
- Headteacher: Matthew Maudsley
- Gender: Coeducational
- Age: 11 to 18
- Enrolment: 588 as of December 2022
- Houses: Phoenix, Pegasus, Griffin, Wyvern
- Website: www.cartertoncc.oxon.sch.uk

Carterton Community College is a coeducational secondary school located in Carterton in the English county of Oxfordshire.

It is a community school administered by Oxfordshire County Council. The school offers GCSEs, BTECs and OCR Nationals as programmes of study for pupils.

The school won the School Library Association Library Design Award in 2013.
