= Fonda 500 =

British band

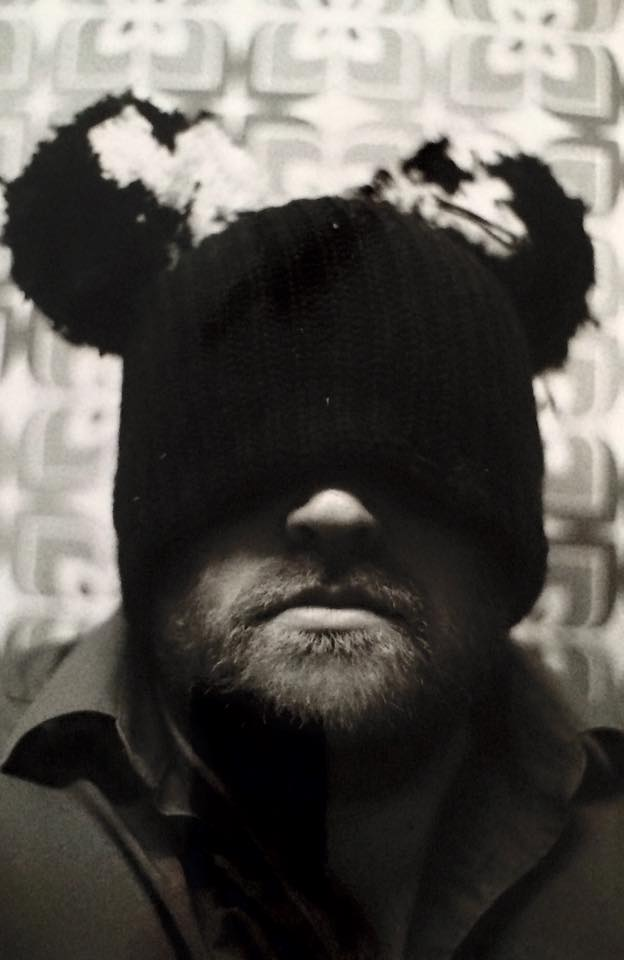
- Band member Simon Stone

Background information
- Origin: Hull, England
- Genres: Electropop
- Years active: 1995–2023
- Labels: Record Mountain, Low Transit Industries
- Members: Simon Stone; Matt Edible; Ian Appleyard; Bod; Nicholas Broten
- Website: Old website

Fonda 500 (aka F500 or Fonda500) are a British electropop band from Kingston upon Hull.

Formed in 1995, Fonda 500 have been releasing albums since 2000. Their songs appeared on the soundtrack to the British comedy television programme, Teachers, Colin Farrell film Intermission and E4's Skins (2010).

== History ==
Their first two albums were released on Village Records (Hull), followed by a signing to Truck Records (Oxford) for No. 1 Hifi Hair. Gentle Electric (Nottingham) released Spectrumatronicalogical Sounds and the ABCDELP.

Their sixth album, Je m'appelle Stereo, was released on their own label Record mountain in 2008. In 2014 they released 8-Bit Sound System, a limited edition cassette which rendered the entire of Eight Track Sound System into 8 bit. By 2018 the new album I Heart Fonda 500 was released by Record mountain, to be followed by the remix album "I Hate Fonda 500" in 2019.

The band announced a final performance in 2023.

== Discography ==
=== Albums ===
- Je m'appelle Stereo
- ABCDELP
- No.1 Hi-fi Hair
- Spectrumatronicalogical Sounds
- The Autumn/Winter Collection
- Eight Track Sound System
- 8 bit sound system
- I heart fonda 500
- I hate fonda 500

=== Singles ===
- Super Chimpanzee
- 8 Track
- I Like Nick Broten
- Computer Freaks Of The Galaxy
- Keybooooords belong to the animals
- Law of the Claw
- IamLove
- Greatest Living Sound
