= Wood (festival) =

Coordinates: 51.55465°N 1.083068°W

- Genre: Folk
- Locations: Braziers Park, Ipsden
- Years active: 2008–present
- Founders: Robin and Joe Bennett
- Website: www.woodfestival.com

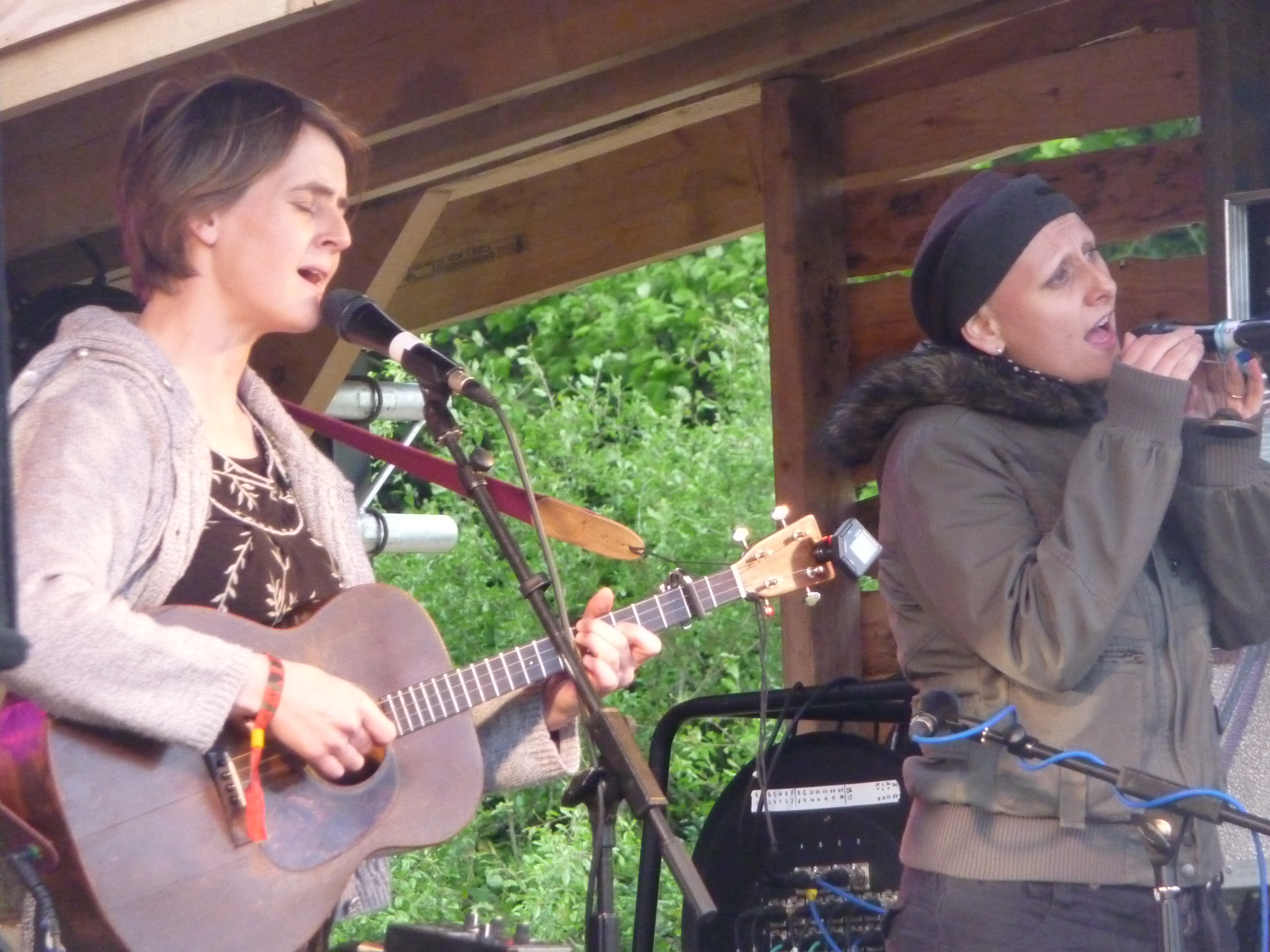
Karine Polwart (left) performing at Wood.

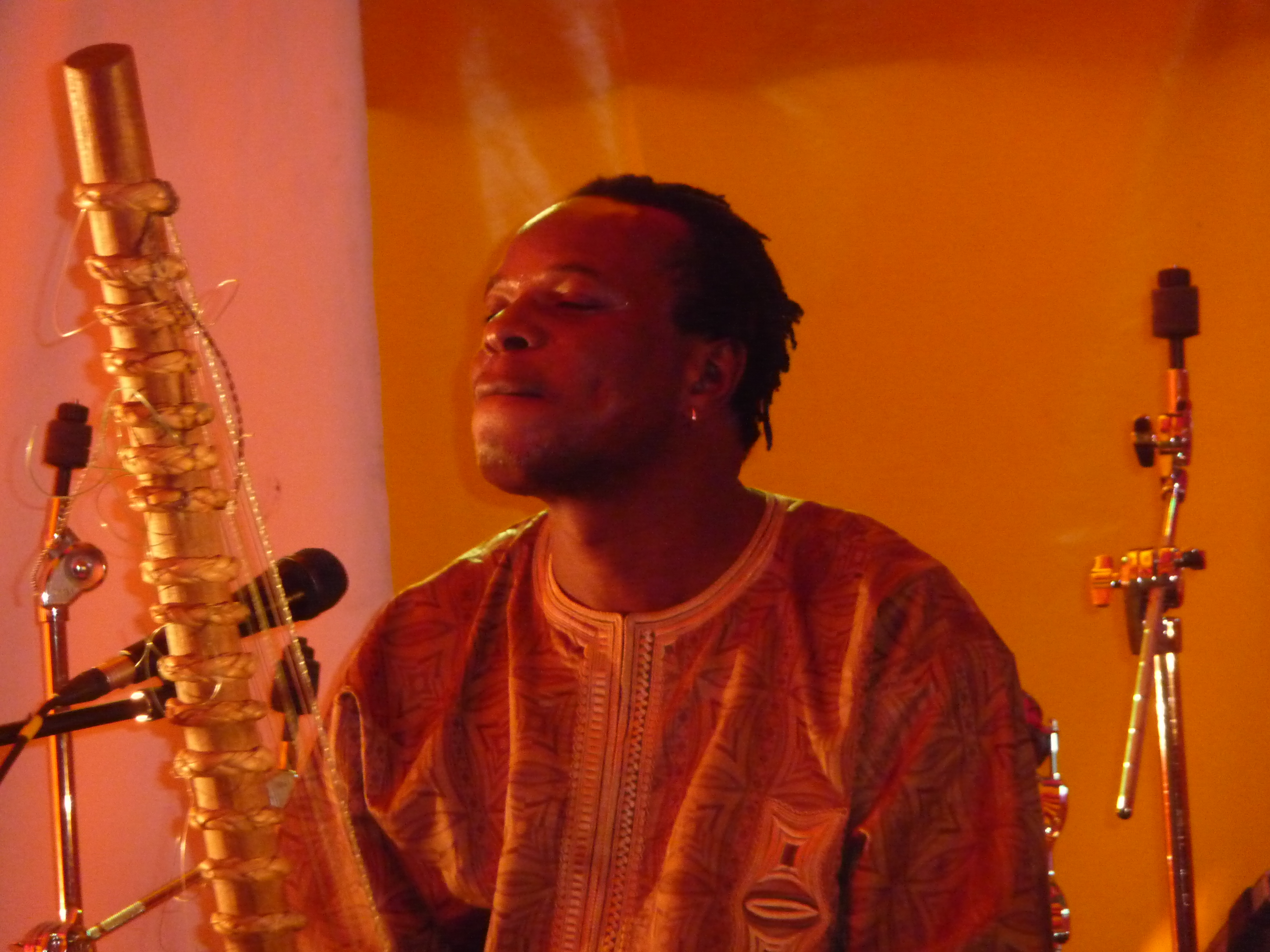
Jali Fily Cisshoko performing at Wood.

Wood is an annual small early summer folk and roots music festival and environmental gathering, which takes place in Braziers Park, Ipsden near Wallingford, Oxfordshire, UK. Its independent organisers, Robin and Joe Bennett, also arrange the Truck Festival.

== Events ==
There are two stages and the acts alternate between the two. The main stage is built of wood, and is solar-powered. The second stage (the Tree Tent) is in a medium-sized circus big-top and runs on bio-diesel. There is now a bicycle-powered disco as well. There are many workshops, including woodcraft, African drumming, jewellery making, thatching, poetry and singing.

== Performers ==
The first Wood took place in 2008, and performers (primarily playing acoustic instruments) have included Brakes, Dodgy, Karine Polwart, Devon Sproule, King Creosote, Lightspeed Champion and Get Cape. Wear Cape. Fly as well as many local musicians (including Stornoway who headlined in 2008 and 2024).

In 2010, the performers included Frank Turner, Peggy Sue, and The Unthanks.

In 2011, the performers included Sarabeth Tucek, Thea Gilmore, Eliza Carthy, Willy Mason, and Uiscedwr.
