= Bonxie (album) =

Studio album by Stornoway
- Released: 13 April 2015
- Genre: Indie rock
- Length: 44:42
- Label: Cooking Vinyl
- Producer: Gil Norton

Stornoway chronology
Tales from Terra Firma (2013)	Bonxie (2015)

Professional ratings
Aggregate scores
Source	Rating
Metacritic	85/100
Review scores
Source	Rating
AllMusic	4/5 stars

Bonxie is the third studio album by British indie rock band Stornoway. It was released in April 2015 under Cooking Vinyl. The title refers to the great skua seabird, which in Shetland is colloquially referred to as a bonxie. It is one of several references to birds on the album, which also includes birdsong on many of the tracks, in a nod to lead singer Brian Briggs' academic background in ornithology and his love of birds in general.

== Track listing ==
No.	Title	Length
1.	"Between the Saltmarsh and the Sea"	4:29
2.	"Get Low"	3:39
3.	"Man On Wire"	3:57
4.	"The Road You Didn't Take"	4:19
5.	"Lost Youth"	3:55
6.	"Sing With Our Senses"	3:56
7.	"We Were Giants"	4:19
8.	"When You're Feeling Gentle"	4:13
9.	"Heart of the Great Alone"	4:09
10.	"Josephine"	3:03
11.	"Love Song of the Beta Male"	4:43

== Critical reception ==
The album was generally well received by the British press. Guardian critic Dave Simpson gave it five out of five stars, describing it as 'big music, which deserves the largest stage'. Paul Mardles in the same newspaper said it 'indicates the four-piece's future lies beyond the confines of jaunty folk-pop'. It was also positively reviewed by Q, Mojo, and Uncut magazines.
