= Willie J Healey =

English singer-songwriter

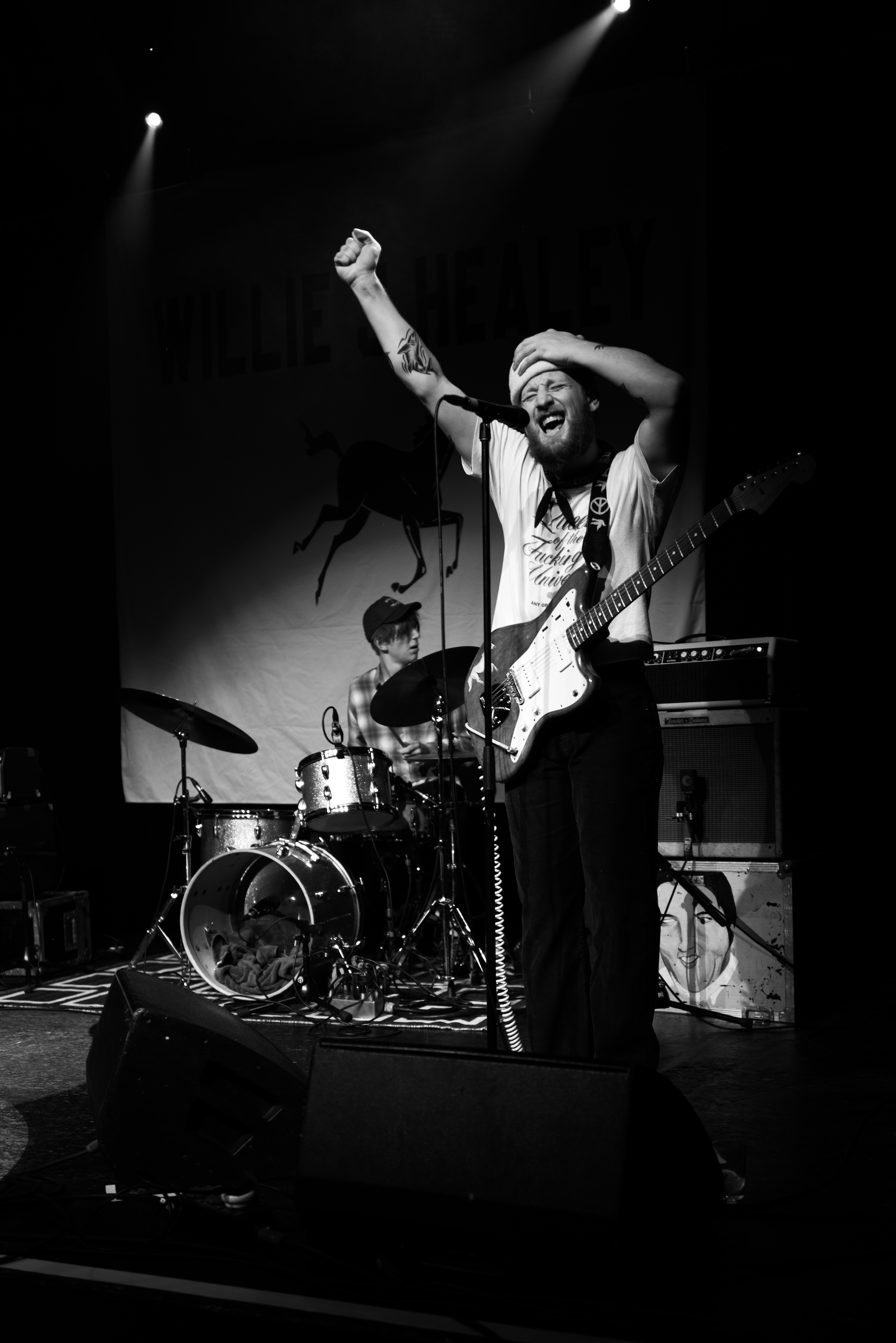
- Healey performing at Ampere in Munich, 2024

Background information
- Born: May 18, 1994 (age 32); Carterton, Oxfordshire, England

William John Healey (born 18 May 1994) is an English singer-songwriter. Born in Oxfordshire, he has released three studio albums – People and Their Dogs (2017), Twin Heavy (2020) and Bunny (2023).

== Early life ==
Healey was born in 1994 in Carterton, Oxfordshire. He attended Carterton Community College, then attended Oxford & Cherwell Valley College where he took a music diploma.

Healey is completely self-taught. Speaking about how he got into playing music, he said, "My dad and grandad both play and would always play at Christmas, and that was my main motivation to play. I wanted to play Oasis covers with them." Healey initially planned to become a boxer. Before getting a recording deal, he earned money by working with his dad as a plasterer in Carterton.

== Career ==
Healey releases music under the name Willie J Healey; he stated that "'Willie Healey', as a name on its own, sounded like it needed something going on in the middle there... I feel like a bit more of a character with the 'J'." His main musical influence is Neil Young.

Healey's first album, People and Their Dogs (2017), was released on Columbia Records, however he was subsequently dropped by the label. During August 2018, he supported Gaz Coombes on his UK tour. Healey recorded and released his second album Twin Heavy (2020) on Yala Records.

His third album Bunny was released in August 2023 and nominated for BBC 6 Music's Album Of The Year. Bunny's debut single, Thank You, features Healey’s friend Jamie T. Healey claims that Jamie T lent him a drum machine during the COVID-19 pandemic lockdown, which led to the album’s more funk-based sound. This was followed by the single Little Sister in April 2023, with future singles set to include Sure Feels Good and Dreams. In support of the Bunny album, Healey supported Florence & the Machine on their 2023 arena tour of the UK, Arctic Monkeys on the European leg of their 2023 tour and Idles, on their 2024 UK tour. 2026 he releases an ep 143 on the V2 label.

== Discography ==
Studio albums

- People and Their Dogs (2017)
- Twin Heavy (2020) UK 59
- Bunny (2023) UK 69

EPs

- HD Malibu (2015)
- Saturday Night Feeling (2015)
- Hey Big Moon (2016)
- 666 Kill (2018)
- Hello Good Morning (2019)
