= Tales from Terra Firma =

Studio album by Stornoway
- Released: 19 March 2013
- Genre: Rock
- Length: 43:10
- Label: 4AD

Stornoway chronology
Beachcomber's Windowsill (2010)	Tales from Terra Firma (2013)	Bonxie (2015)

Professional ratings
Aggregate scores
Source	Rating
Metacritic	71/100
Review scores
Source	Rating
AllMusic	3.5/5 stars

Tales from Terra Firma is the second studio album by British indie rock band Stornoway. It was released in 2013 under the 4AD label.

== Track list ==
No.	Title	Length
1.	"You Take Me as I Am"	5:09
2.	"Farewell Appalachia"	5:12
3.	"The Bigger Picture"	3:59
4.	"(A Belated) Invite to Eternity"	6:31
5.	"Hook, Line, Sinker"	5:13
6.	"Knock Me on the Head"	3:45
7.	"The Great Procrastinator"	4:38
8.	"The Ones We Hurt the Most"	5:31
9.	"November Song"	3:42
