= Carterton, Oxfordshire =

Town in Oxfordshire, England

Coordinates: 51.76°N 1.59°W

Carterton
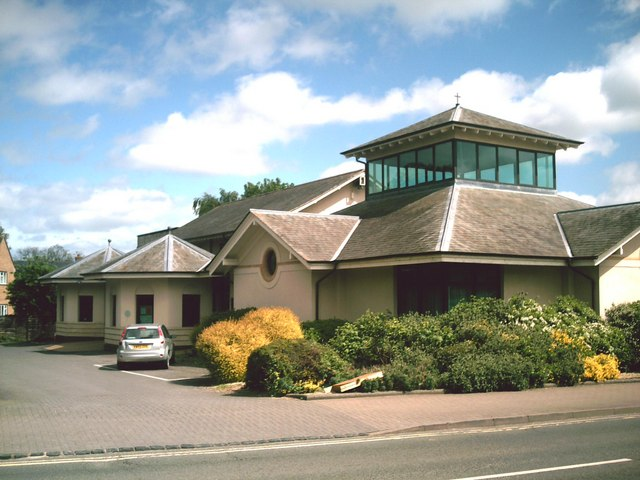
- St John the Evangelist parish church

- Location within Oxfordshire
- Population: 15,680 (2021 Census)
- OS grid reference: SP2806
  - London: 72.4 miles (116.5 km)
- Civil parish: Carterton
- District: West Oxfordshire
- Shire county: Oxfordshire
- Region: South East
- Country: England
- Sovereign state: United Kingdom
- Post town: Carterton
- Postcode district: OX18
- Dialling code: 01993
- Police: Thames Valley
- Fire: Oxfordshire
- Ambulance: South Central
- UK Parliament: Witney
- Website: Carterton Community Website

Carterton is a town in West Oxfordshire district in the county of Oxfordshire, England and is 4 miles (6.4 km) south-west of Witney. The 2011 Census recorded the parish's population as 15,769. The current population as estimated by censusdata.uk is 18,691.

== History ==
Much of what is now the northern part of the town was held by the Moleyns family from at least 1369, but in 1429 William Lord Moleyns was killed at the siege of Orléans and the land passed to the Hungerford family. During the medieval period the main road through Carterton was one of the most important in the country, taking trains of packhorses laden with Cotswold wool over Radcot Bridge and on to Southampton for export to the weaving centre of Europe. In the 1770s the land was acquired by the Duke of Marlborough.

The pattern of the present settlement dates from 1894 when part of the estate was sold to Homesteads Limited whose director was William Carter. The land was divided into plots of 6 acres and sold for £20 an acre with bungalows costing from £120. Many of the settlers were retired soldiers and people moving from the towns. Carterton soon made its name in the market gardening world. Black grapes from Frenchester Nurseries and the famous Carterton tomatoes were sold at Covent Garden Market.

Carterton, which by the late 20th century was one of the largest towns in Oxfordshire, was founded soon after 1900 as a colony of smallholders, on agricultural land in the northern part of Black Bourton parish. The founder was William Carter of Branksome (Dorset), a speculator who, through his company Homesteads Ltd of London, bought estates in several counties, in order to establish smallholdings and attract people back to the land. In Oxfordshire he acquired from W. C. Arkell, in 1900, the 740-a. Rock farm north of Black Bourton village, part of an estate sold by the duke of Marlborough in 1894. By late 1902 there were 16 houses, and the following year the new settlement, already called Carterton, was included in a local trades directory.

=== Development from the Second World War ===
Carterton's later growth was closely related to the construction in 1937 of the nearby RAF Brize Norton airbase. This development profoundly altered the settlement's character as Brize Norton became the Royal Air Force's largest operating base. A small group of substantial two-storey houses for RAF personnel, called Brizewood, was built east of Swinbrook Road about 1938, and in the 1950s was expanded with uniform bungalows for American servicemen. By 1953 Carterton was a "busy and expanding village", and its rapid population increase was creating severe housing problems: in 1962 the plight of significant numbers of caravan dwellers prompted an article in the Lancet, though many residents took exception to the town's portrayal, and denied that the picture was typical. By then there were claimed to be more civilians than servicemen living in mobile homes, some of them single women, and the "shack-like houses of the early settlers", their "meagre appearance [bearing] eloquent witness to tight budgets and hardship" elsewhere on the "busy village main street".

A few scattered "Robin" hangars, hastily built during the Second World War to allow aircraft to be housed away from the airfield itself, were converted to other uses during the same period, one on Alvescot Road surviving in the early 21st century as part of a motor repair garage. Rock Farm and its converted agricultural buildings, all stone-built, survived as a small group at the intersection of Lawton and Arkell Avenues, with William Wilkinson's pair of model labourers' cottages set back from the Alvescot road between modern housing. In 1967 an ambitious scheme was launched for controlled expansion and for regeneration of the town centre, with a ring road (Upavon Way) to serve new housing, to divert traffic from the centre, and to contain future expansion. New RAF housing was to provide over 1,450 dwellings and private enterprise another 300, while local authorities were to provide shops and other much needed facilities around the central crossroads. A reduced scheme for the town centre was launched in 1975 after repeated delays and controversy, and Upavon Way was opened soon after.

By 1976 over 2,000 houses had been built since the 1960s, those on the large estates in the north-east mostly of uniform appearance with concrete exteriors, and 850 more were planned. Settlement by then spilled over the parish boundary into Brize Norton, though on the north there was no expansion beyond the parish boundary, and expansion south of Milestone Road was constrained by the airfield perimeter. A large transit hotel within the airfield precinct was built by the RAF in 1970 to serve military personnel and their families. The number of people in mobile homes still caused controversy in 1980, when there were almost 250 permanent or temporary pitches distributed among several sites, and in the early 1980s some sites were closed and replaced by council houses. Expansion in the town's eastern part, chiefly for housing, continued in the mid 1980s.

By 1997 the town centre had been transformed: shops in a variety of styles lined the four broad main streets, interspersed with a few older buildings such as the Beehive Hotel and the former Emporium, and the crossroads was dominated by a tall domed tower built in 1996, surmounting new shops and offices. A large Co-operative Society supermarket of flamboyant design, on the site of the earlier building on Black Bourton Road, was erected in 1998, and in 2000 work began on a major expansion programme on the town's eastern edge, to include another 1,200 houses, a shopping centre, leisure facilities, and a new access road. A variety of early settler's houses also survived scattered among the modern buildings, though by 2004 several had been recently demolished or were semiderelict and under threat from developers, prompting mounting local controversy.

== Public buildings and social provision ==
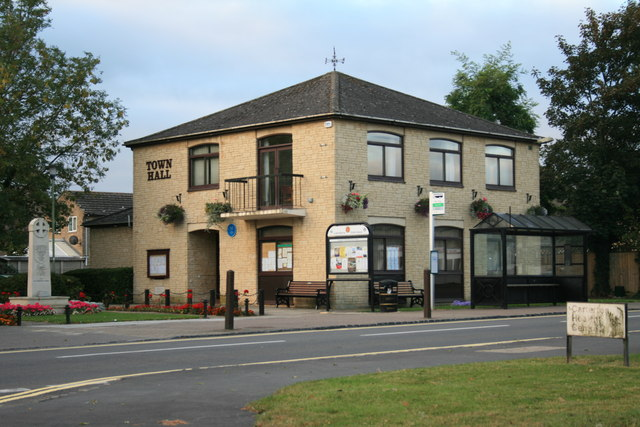
Carterton Town Hall

In the late 1960s a new police station was built on Burford Road for a staff of eight, together with six police houses, and the original police house was demolished. The station is no longer open to the public but still serves as a base for local policing. A war memorial erected at the crossroads about 1920 was moved to the new town hall on Alvescot Road which was completed in 1983. A reading room mentioned in 1917 was succeeded by a small library also in part of the former Emporium. Refreshment rooms were mentioned in 1924, the Beehive Hotel on Burford Road was opened in 1932, and the Golden Eagle (renamed the Olde Aviator in 1996) was opened in the former Emporium in 1954.

Land for a recreation ground north of Alvescot Road was given by Carter in 1906, and football, cricket, tennis, and bowls clubs were formed around 1920, together with a choral society. From 1904 to the 1920s there was a resident physician, and in 1928 a solicitor visited once a week. Construction work on RAF Brize Norton began in 1935. Wartime saw the rapid growth of the base. An air raid destroyed 46 aircraft; the remainder were then dispersed round the village and one hangar which is now an Aldi supermarket on the Alvescot Road. From 1950 to 1965 the camp was to be the home of the USAF bomber wings. The RAF returned in 1965 and undertook a large building programme, making RAF Brize Norton its main air transport base in the country.

Carterton Town Hall was built south of Alvescot Road in 1982–3. With the growth of the village, the small mission church at the central crossroads was replaced in 1963 by the church of St John the Evangelist. The link with the mother church of St. Mary's at Black Bourton was kept alive by the donation of one of the bells from the tower. This was made by H. Knight of Reading and is dated 1619.

In the first decade of the 21st century, the new Shilton Park development in Northeast Carterton was built, providing a mix of housing for private ownership and social letting. The new St. John the Evangelist CE VA primary school has been built at Shilton Park and construction of a local shopping centre is now complete. A new Memorial Garden has been built near the town to continue the public mourning seen at Royal Wootton Bassett as military repatriations for dead service personnel have now been routed to Brize Norton.

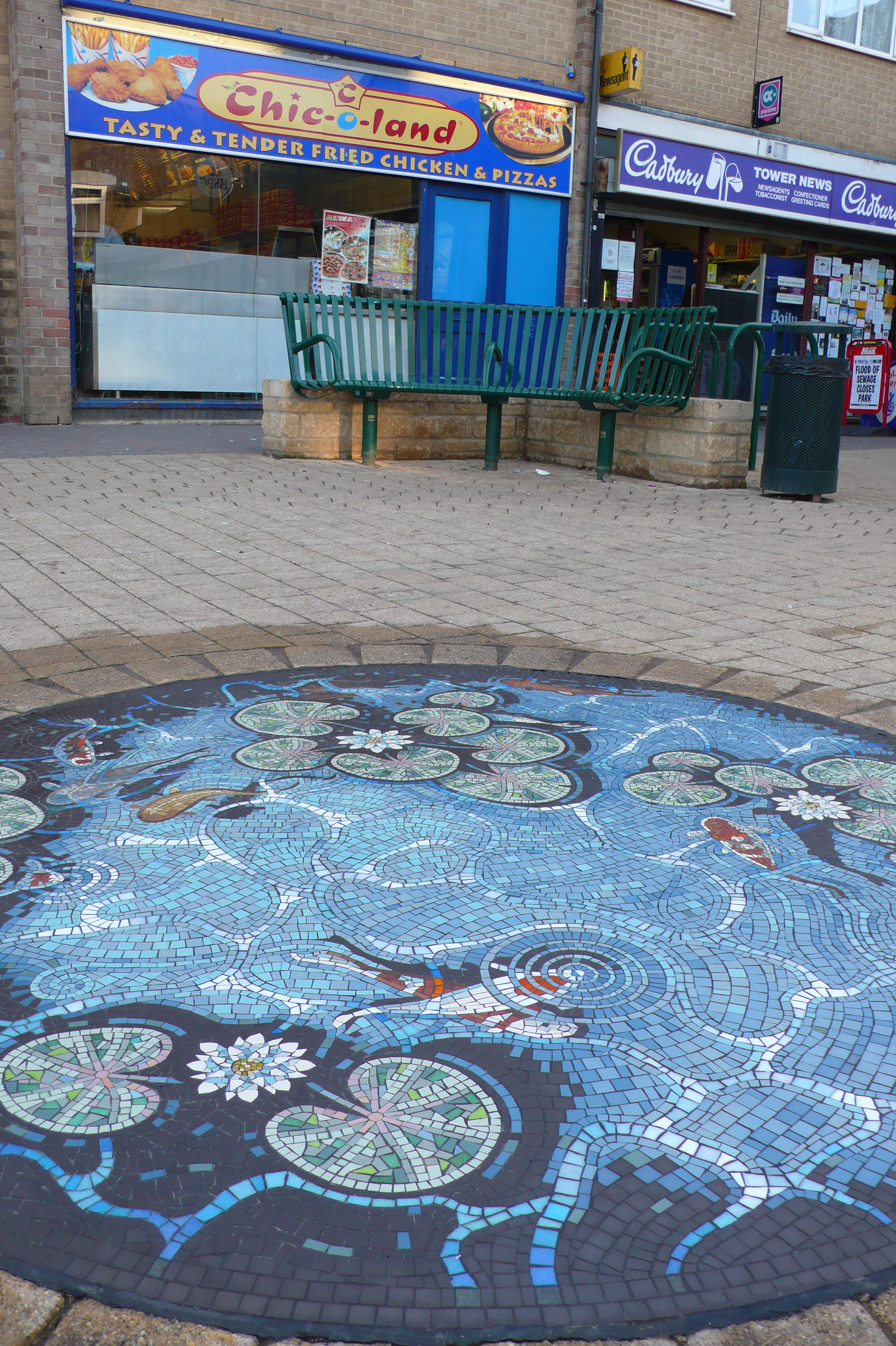
Koi fishpond floor mosaic in Tower Square, Carterton. Commissioned by the Town Council in 2008 by artist Gary Drostle.

== Governance ==
The grandfather of Theo Walcott, Windell "Joe" Walcott (1926–2018), was council chairman between 2002 and 2006 and mayor of Carterton from 2000 to 2002. He was awarded an MBE in 2006 for his services to the community in Carterton and West Oxfordshire.

The current Mayor of Carterton is Simon Watson, who was elected Town Mayor and Chair of the Council at the Annual Town Council Meeting on 19 May 2026.

== Education ==
Carterton has one Secondary School:

- Carterton Community College,

Carterton has five primary schools:

- Carterton Primary School,
- Edith Moorhouse Primary School,
- The Gateway Primary School,
- St John the Evangelist Church of England Primary School and
- St Joseph's Catholic Primary School.

St. John the Evangelist and St. Joseph's are voluntary controlled schools. Carterton Community College is the town's secondary school.

== Media ==
Local news and television programmes are provided by BBC South and ITV Meridian. Television signals are received from the Oxford TV transmitter. Local radio stations are BBC Radio Oxford on 95.2 FM, Heart South on 102.6 FM, Greatest Hits Radio South (formerly Jack FM) on 106.4 FM and Witney Radio, a community based station which broadcast to the town on 99.9 FM. The town is served by the local newspapers, Oxford Times,Oxfordshire Guardian and Witney Gazette.

== Amenities ==
Carterton has shops, four public houses. There is a public lending library in the town centre. it also has local shops as well as an Asda, Morrisons and Aldi.

=== Sport and leisure ===
Carterton has a Non-League football team Carterton F.C. who play at Kilkenny Lane. The town also has squash and bowls clubs, as well as a leisure centre complete with a swimming pool and several gyms.

== Climate ==
Climate data for RAF Brize Norton (1991–2020)
Month	Jan	Feb	Mar	Apr	May	Jun	Jul	Aug	Sep	Oct	Nov	Dec	Year
Mean daily maximum °C (°F)	7.7 (45.9)	8.3 (46.9)	10.9 (51.6)	13.9 (57.0)	17.1 (62.8)	20.1 (68.2)	22.5 (72.5)	21.9 (71.4)	19.0 (66.2)	14.8 (58.6)	10.6 (51.1)	8.0 (46.4)	14.6 (58.3)
Mean daily minimum °C (°F)	1.7 (35.1)	1.6 (34.9)	3.0 (37.4)	4.8 (40.6)	7.6 (45.7)	10.5 (50.9)	12.6 (54.7)	12.5 (54.5)	10.3 (50.5)	7.5 (45.5)	4.2 (39.6)	2.0 (35.6)	6.6 (43.9)
Average rainfall mm (inches)	66.2 (2.61)	48.1 (1.89)	46.4 (1.83)	49.2 (1.94)	60.1 (2.37)	49.8 (1.96)	55.1 (2.17)	58.6 (2.31)	54.2 (2.13)	70.9 (2.79)	73.2 (2.88)	74.2 (2.92)	706.0 (27.80)
Average rainy days (≥ 1 mm)	12.3	9.6	9.3	9.9	9.5	8.7	8.4	10.1	8.9	11.4	12.8	12.3	123.4
Mean monthly sunshine hours	62.6	81.3	123.2	171.9	206.1	209.4	214.7	193.4	151.5	111.6	70.8	55.5	1,652
Source: Met Office

== Notes ==
=== Further reading ===
- Townley, Simon C. (ed.); Colvin, Christina; Cragoe, Carol; Ortenberg, Veronica; Peberdy, R.B.; Selwyn, Nesta; Williamson, Elizabeth (2006). A History of the County of Oxford. Victoria County History. Vol. 15: Carterton, Minster Lovell and Environs: Bampton Hundred (Part Three). Woodbridge: Boydell & Brewer for the Institute of Historical Research. pp. 1–7, 101–112. ISBN 978-1-90435-606-6.
