= Thomas E. Hodgson =

English musician (born 1984)

Thomas Hodgson
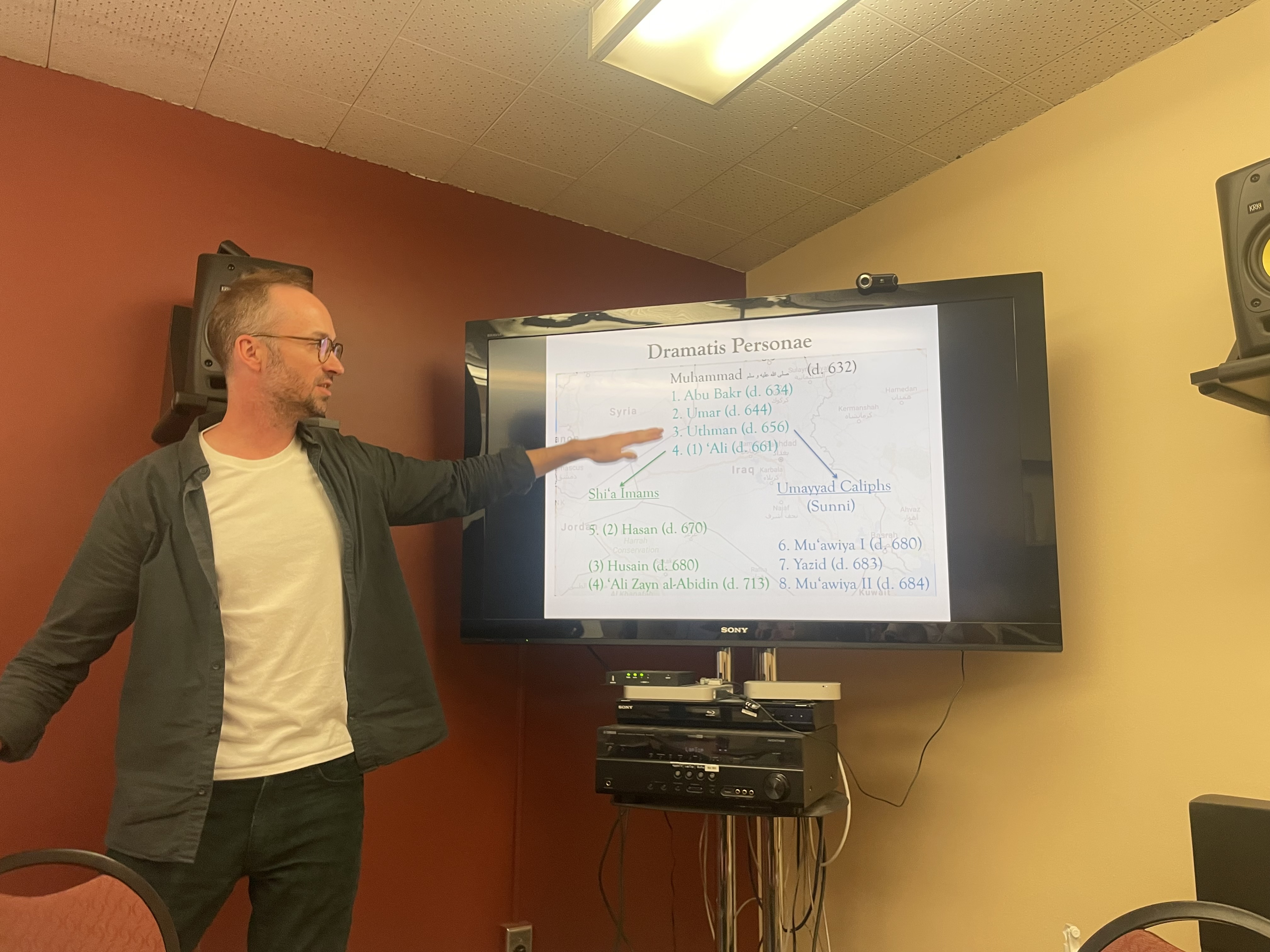
- Thomas E. Hodgson teaching at UCLA, fall 2023

Background information
- Birth name: Thomas Hodgson
- Genres: folk rock; indie folk; indie pop
- Years active: 2012–present

Thomas Hodgson is an English musician and ethnomusicologist, who studies algorithms and AI in global contexts, with a particular focus on Pakistan and the Pakistani diaspora. Previously a British Academy Fellow at King's College, London, Hodgson is currently Assistant Professor Of Musicology & Music Industry at UCLA Herb Alpert School of Music, and performs trumpet & percussion with Stornoway (band), in addition to frequent collaborations with composer Edward Nesbit. Hodgson has taught at Lady Margaret Hall and Magdalen College, Oxford.

== Writings ==
Year	Title	Publication
2021	Quantifying Music: Imagined Metrics in Digital Startup Culture	Culture, Theory and Critique
2021	Spotify and the Democratisation of Music	Popular Music
2020	The Wood of the Flute: Stories from Kashmir	The Nkoda Journal
2020	AI: More Than Human	Sound Studies
2016	Music Festivals in Pakistan and England	Islam and Popular Culture
2014	Le Mela de Bradford	Le Cahier d’Ethnomusicologie, Festivalization(s)
2013	"Do what the Qur’an says and stay away from crack”: Mirpuri Muslims, Rap Music, and the City	Rescripting Religion in the City: Migration and Religious Identity in the Modern Mertropolis
2013	South Asian Musics, Cultures and Communities in Newcastle Upon Tyne and the North East of England	Newcastle University Report
2013	South Asian Musics, Multiculturalism and Communities: A Review of Literature and Key Concepts	Newcastle University Report
2012	Interview with Raja (Radio DJ), Walsall, Birmingham	Performing Islam
2012	Multicultural Harmony? Pakistani Muslims and Music in Bradford	Music, Culture and Identity in the Muslim World: Performance, Politics and Piety

== Discography ==
- Bonxie (2015)
- Bonxie Unplucked (2015)
- The Farewell Show (2020)
- Dig the Mountain! (2023)
