= Sing My Song season 2 =

Sing My Song
- Season 2
- Hosted by: Negmat Rahman; Li Jiaming (李佳明)
- Judges: Yu Quan; Tanya Chua; Liu Huan; Wakin Chau
- No. of contestants: 58
- Winner: Hanggai (杭盖乐队)
- Winning mentor: Liu Huan
- Runner-up: Su Yunying (苏运莹)

Release
- Original network: CCTV-3
- Original release: January 2 – March 13, 2015

Season chronology
- ← Previous; Season 1 Next → Season 3

Sing My Song (season 2) was broadcast on CCTV-3 from January 2, 2015 to March 13, 2015, presented by Negmat Rahman (Episodes 1 - 6) and Li Jiaming (李佳明) (Episodes 7 - End). Tanya Chua, Liu Huan and Wakin Chau returned as tutors. Yu Quan replaced Yang Kun, who left after just one season. The winner was Hanggai (杭盖乐队) of Liu Huan team and Su Yunying (苏运莹) of Tanya Chua team was the runner-up.

== Tutors and Finalists ==
Diagram	Winner	Runner-up	Third-place	Eliminated in the final stage (by audience votes)
Diagram	Eliminated in the battle stage	Eliminated in the composer round	Eliminated in the selection round	

Tutor	Contestant			
Yu Quan	Xu Jun (许钧)	Wang Hongen (王宏恩)	Su Zixu (苏紫旭)	Lei Yuxin (雷雨心)
Yu Quan	Da Fei (大飞)	Wei Jiayi (魏佳艺)	Zhu Mengdie (朱梦蝶)	Direction band (方向组合)
Yu Quan	Peasant Brothers band (农民兄弟乐队)	Guan Tao (关涛)	Gao Zeshen (高泽深)	Zhong sisters (钟氏姐妹)
Yu Quan	Jiang Shan (蒋山)	Wang Jian (王健)		
Tanya Chua	Su Yunying (苏运莹)	Qi Zitan (祁紫檀)	Yu Tian (羽田)	Chen Luoli (陈萝莉)
Tanya Chua	Pan Gaofeng (潘高峰)	Luo Zhongxu (罗中旭)	Yu Yiting (游怡婷)	Pan Yunan (潘云安)
Tanya Chua	Xu Shunzhe (许顺哲)	Wang Fanrui (王梵瑞)	Wang Zhengrong (王峥嵘)	Li Bo (李博)
Tanya Chua	Huang Kelan (黄珂澜)	Hu siblings (胡氏姐弟)		
Liu Huan	Hanggai (杭盖乐队)	Luo Er (裸儿)	Nawukere Yusupujiang (那吾克热·玉素浦江)	Liu Yutong (刘雨潼)
Liu Huan	Ma Tiao (马条)	Zhao Muyang (赵牧阳)	"Human Sound" Brothers (人聲兄弟)	Liu Huyi (刘胡轶)
Liu Huan	Liang Fan (梁凡)	Zhao Ke (赵可)	Yao Zheng (姚铮)	Cui Nan (崔楠)
Liu Huan	Yang Mingyi (杨明毅)	Chu Qiao (褚乔)		
Wakin Chau	Dai Quan (戴荃)	Gou Naipeng (苟乃鹏)	Liu Runjie (刘润洁)	Eman Lam (林二汶)
Wakin Chau	Li Ziming (黎子明)	Zhao Zhao (昭昭)	Jian Mili (简迷离)	Su Qing (苏晴)
Wakin Chau	Cheng Shijia (程诗迦)	Huang Yang (黄洋)	Wu Han (吴含)	Chen Junhao (陈俊豪)
Wakin Chau	Cheng Yafei (程亚非)	Chen Yun (陈云)		
Bold names are artists who have been given the straight access pass by their respective coach.

== The blind audition ==
=== The blind audition ===
A special rule is added from this season, each tutor has 3 chances to press the "straight access" button. If a contestant is chosen by that button of any tutor and they also choose that tutor, they can pass directly the selection round after and become 1 of 8 contestants of that tutor on the composer round.

Key	Producers pushes his or her control bar	The producer "straight access" key is pressed	Contestant eliminated with no producer pushing his or her control bar	Contestant defaulted to this producer's album	Contestant elected to join this producer's album	The part was not broadcast as a complete version

==== Episode 1 (January 2) ====
Episode 1 on CCTV's official YouTube channel

Order	Contestant	Song	Producer's and contestant's choices			
Order	Contestant	Song	Yu Quan	Tanya Chua	Liu Huan	Wakin Chau
1	Zhao Zhao (昭昭); Age 28, Hebei, Baoding, Mancheng	送春 (Goodbye spring; Sòng chūn)				
2	Peasant Brothers band (农民兄弟乐队); Henan, Hebi, Xun	我的番茄是干净的 (Our tomatoes are clean; Wǒ de fānqié shì gānjìng de)				
3	Yang Yu (杨宇); Age 40, Inner Mongolia, Baotou	最遙遠的那顆星 (The star in the most distant; Zuì yáoyuǎn dì nà kē xīng)	—	—	—	—
4	Su Yunying (苏运莹); Age 23, Hainan, Sanya	野子 (The wild child; Yě zi)				
5	Zhao Muyang (赵牧阳); Age 47, Ningxia, Zhongwei	侠客行 (Ode to Gallantry; Xiákèxíng)				
6	Su Zixu (苏紫旭); Age 24, Inner Mongolia, Bayannur, Urad Front Banner, Ulashan	没有你 (Without you; Méiyǒu nǐ)				—

==== Episode 2 (January 9) ====
Episode 2 on CCTV's official YouTube channel

Order	Contestant	Song	Producer's and contestant's choices			
Order	Contestant	Song	Yu Quan	Tanya Chua	Liu Huan	Wakin Chau
1	Nawukere Yusupujiang (那吾克热·玉素浦江); Age 25, Xinjiang, Ürümqi	漂 (Drift; Piào)				
2	Yu Tian (羽田); Age 23, Canada	让你幸福 (Make dad happy; Ràng nǐ xìngfú)				—
3	Luo Er (裸儿); Age 20, Jiangxi, Pingxiang	会飞的野马 (Flying wild horse; Huì fēi de yěmǎ)		—		
4	Liu Yutong (刘雨潼); Age 32, Gansu, Lanzhou	等风来 (Wait the wind come; Děng fēng lái)				
5	Lei Yuxin (雷雨心); Age 17, Fujian, Fuzhou	记·念 (Memories; Jìniàn)				
6	"Human Sound" Brothers (人声兄弟); Guangxi / Hebei, Qinhuangdao / Tianjin, Ji / Beijing	战孤城 (War of solitary city; Zhàn gūchéng)				
7	Luo Zhongxu (罗中旭); Age 45, Shanghai	恋人 (Lover; Liànrén)				

==== Episode 3 (January 16) ====
Episode 3 on CCTV's official YouTube channel

Order	Contestant	Song	Producer's and contestant's choices			
Order	Contestant	Song	Yu Quan	Tanya Chua	Liu Huan	Wakin Chau
1	Chen Luoli (陈萝莉); Age 19, Zhejiang, Yiwu	小伞 (The small umbrella; Xiǎo sǎn)	—			—
2	Hanggai (杭盖乐队); Qinghai / Inner Mongolia	杭盖 (Hanggai; Háng gài)		—		
3	Liu Runjie (刘润洁); Age 21, Shandong, Weifang	情歌2 (Love Song 2; Qínggē 2)		—	—	
4	Guan Tao (关涛); Age 31, Yunnan, Lijiang	妈妈 我不想再唱悲伤的歌 (Mom, I don't want to sing a sad song again; Māmā wǒ bùxiǎng zài chàng bēishāng de gē)			—	
5	Liu Huyi (刘胡轶); Age 30, Hubei, Wuhan	从前慢 (The slowness in the past; Cóngqián màn)				—
6	Pan Gaofeng (潘高峰); Age 28, Beijing	节奏·爱 (Rhythm - Love; Jiézòu·Ài)				
7	Xu Shunzhe (许顺哲); Age 28, Jilin, Changchun	那就枯萎 (Then it withered; Nà jiù kūwěi)				—
8	Liang Fan (梁凡); Age 26, Shaanxi, Xi'an	阿楚姑娘 (The girl A Chu; Ā chǔ gūniáng)	—			

==== Episode 4 (January 23) ====
Episode 4 on CCTV's official YouTube channel

Order	Contestant	Song	Producer's and contestant's choices			
Order	Contestant	Song	Yu Quan	Tanya Chua	Liu Huan	Wakin Chau
1	Cheng Shijia (程诗迦); Age 28, Shanxi, Changzhi	解药 (Antidote; Jiě yào)		—	—	
2	Gou Naipeng (苟乃鹏); Age 22, Qingdao	不等你 (Don't wait you; Bù děng nǐ)			—	
3	Jian Mili (简迷离); Su Na (苏娜); Age 35, Sichuan, Chengdu; Gabriel (加百利); Age 36, France	怪兽不跳舞 (Monsters don't dance; Guàishòu bù tiàowǔ)	—		—	
4	Ma Tiao (马条); Age 43, Xinjiang, Karamay	傻瓜 (Fool; Shǎguā)	—			
5	Wei Jiayi (魏佳艺); Age 31, Gansu, Lanzhou	OK OK				
6	Xu Jun (许钧); Age 26, Anhui, Bengbu	自己 (Self; Zìjǐ)			—	
7	Da Fei (大飞); Age 35, Beijing	夏天 (Summer; Xiàtiān)		—	—	

==== Episode 5 (January 30) ====
Episode 5 on CCTV's official YouTube channel

Order	Contestant	Song	Producer's and contestant's choices			
Order	Contestant	Song	Yu Quan	Tanya Chua	Liu Huan	Wakin Chau
1	Wang Fanrui (王梵瑞); Age 36, Shaanxi, Xianyang	时光谣 (Time lapse; Shíguāng yáo)	—		—	—
2	Gao Zeshen (高泽深); Age 37, Nanjing	二叔 (2nd uncle; Èr shū)		—	—	—
3	Huang Yang (黄洋); Age 34, Chongqing	冒牌专家 (Counterfeit expert; Màopái zhuānjiā)			—	
4	Chung sisters (钟氏姐妹); Sherman Chung (钟舒漫); Age 30, Hong Kong; Sukie Chung (鍾舒祺); Age 29, Hong Kong	SS实验室 (SS laboratory; SS shíyàn shì)		—	—	
5	Wu Han (吴含); Age 25, Ningxia, Shizuishan	远 (Far; Yuǎn)		—	—	
6	Chen Junhao (陈俊豪); Age 27, Liaoning, Fushun	怎么 (How; Zěnme)	—	—	—	
7	Cheng Yafei (程亚非); Age 37, Shanxi, Xiangyuan	大侠路人甲 (Passer-by hero; Dà xiá lùrén jiǎ)		—		
8	Jiang Shan (蒋山); Age 31, Qinghai, Xining	面朝大海春暖花开 (Facing the ocean, spring and blossom; Miàn cháo dàhǎi chūnnuǎn huā kāi)		—	—	
9	Chen Yun (陈云); Age 34, Sichuan, Liangshan, Mianning	你做妈妈 我做爸爸 (You do mother I do father; Nǐ zuò māmā wǒ zuò bàba)		—	—	
10	Su Qing (苏晴); Age 31, Guangxi, Nanning	不客气 (Don't polite; Bù kèqì)		—	—	
11	Wang Hongen (王宏恩); Age 39, Taiwan, Taitung	不用担心我 (Don't worry about me; Bùyòng dānxīn wǒ)			—	
12	Dai Quan (戴荃); Age 35, Nanjing	悟空 (Wukong; Wùkōng)		—	—	
13	You Yiting (游怡婷); Age 23, Taiwan	在你肩膀上入睡 (Falling asleep on your shoulder; Zài nǐ jiānbǎng shàng rùshuì)				
14	Wang Zhengrong (王峥嵘); Age 25, Ningxia, Yinchuan	唱歌的孩子 (The children usually sing; Chànggē de háizi)	—			
15	Eman Lam (林二汶); Age 32, Hong Kong	至死不渝 (No betray till the dead; Zhì sǐ bù yú)		—	—	
16	Qi Zitan (祁紫檀); Age 23, Shandong, Boxing	出离 (Leave far away; Chū lí)				—

==== Episode 6 (February 6) ====
Episode 6 on CCTV's official YouTube channel

Order	Contestant	Song	Producer's and contestant's choices			
Order	Contestant	Song	Yu Quan	Tanya Chua	Liu Huan	Wakin Chau
1	Zhao Ke (赵可); Age 38, Hunan, Shaoyang	井水花 (Well water flower; Jǐng shuǐhuā)	—			—
2	Li Bo (李博); Age 29, Guangxi, Yulin	孤独的自由 (Lonely freedom; Gūdú de zìyóu)	—		—	—
3	Huang Kelan (黄珂澜); Age 23, Sichuan, Chengdu	平凡的日子 (Extraordinary day; Píngfán de rìzi)	—		—	—
4	Yao Zheng (姚铮); Age 33, Hebei, Baoding	诱惑 (Temptation; Yòuhuò)		—		—
5	Hu siblings (胡氏姐弟); Hu Sihua (胡斯华); Age 31, Singapore; Hu Sihan (胡斯汉); Age 25, Taiwan	Running On Water	—		—	—
6	Zhu Mengdie (朱梦蝶); Age 23, Sichuan, Chengdu	船 (Boat; Chuán)			—	
7	Cui Nan (崔楠); Age 31, Yunnan, Kunming	懦弱 (Cowardly; Nuòruò)				
8	Wang Jian (王健); Age 30, Guangzhou	小礼物 (Small gift; Xiǎo lǐwù)		—	—	
9	Li Ziming (黎子明); Age 22, United States	夜不眠 (Sleepless night; Yè bùmián)	—	—	—	
10	Pan Yunan (潘云安); Age 20, Taiwan, Yilan	冷色系 (Cold colors; Lěngsè xì)	—		—	FULL
11	Yang Mingyi (杨明毅); Age 37, Henan, Xinxiang, Huojia	一位老人 (An old man; Yī wèi lǎorén)		FULL		FULL
12	Direction band (方向乐队); Qian Jun (钱俊); Age 22, Hubei, Wuhan; Zhang Yi (张毅); Age 29, Hubei, Wuhan	你眼中 (In your eyes; Nǐ yǎnzhōng)		FULL		FULL
13	Chu Qiao (褚乔); Age 25, Hebei, Tangshan	晚安 (Good night; Wǎn'ān)	FULL	FULL		FULL
14	Luo Wenyu (罗文裕); Age 38, Taiwan	爱上自然的你 (You fall in love with nature; Ài shàng zìrán de nǐ)	FULL	FULL	FULL	FULL

=== The second time of selection ===
This part was broadcast at the end of episode 6. Each tutor must choose 8 best performances between their 14 choices after the blind audition (exclude the performances was chosen by "straight access" button). 8 contestant groups, who are chosen by tuteur, advance in the composer round and their music products will be certainly in their tutor album.

== The composer and the battle stage ==
8 contestant groups, their tutor and mentor stay together for 24 hours (for Liu Huan team) or 12 hours (for other teams), in a large place of a hotel, divided into many rooms like 4 composer rooms (A, B, C, D), 1 tutor room, 1 room for lunch (or diner). Each contestant group must compose a new song follow the tutor subject during that time, include the eating time, each 2 groups are in 1 room (decided by lucky drawing).

Someone, who finish their new song, can perform it in front of their tutor and mentor, and then go home. 5 best new songs (4 winners of each room and 1 in the rest) chosen by their tutor can perform in the battle stage.

On each day of the battle stage, the 51 media juries have given a score by live votes (1 vote = 1 point) for each song after each contestant performance. After 5 performances of that day, the 3 others team tutors, each could give 5 points for only one contestant they wanted. The two contestants, the first who won the highest score and the second was selected by their team tutor, have represented their team to perform on the final stage.

Notes	Winner of each room	Resurrection	Eliminated

=== Episode 7 (February 13) - Liu Huan team - "Follow Heart" (随心) ===
Episode 7 on CCTV's official YouTube channel

The composer round

- Subject : Last year (去年)
- Guest appearance as team captain : Henry Huo (霍尊) (Winner of Liu Huan team at Sing My Song (season 1))

Room	Winner	Song	Time used (hour)	Loser	Song	Time used (hour)	Resurrection by tutor and mentor
A	Hanggai (杭盖乐队)	轮回 (Rebirth; Lúnhuí)	9:55	"Human Sound" Brothers (人聲兄弟)	山顶花园 (Hill top garden; Shāndǐng huāyuán)	18:10	
B	Ma Tiao (马条)	收获 (Harvest; Shōuhuò)	3:55	Liu Yutong (刘雨潼)	留给昨天 (Leave the yesterday; Liú gěi zuótiān)	21:15	√
C	Luo Er (裸儿)	呐喊 (Shout; Nàhǎn)	12:25	Zhao Muyang (赵牧阳)	风在吹 (Wind is blowing; Fēng zài chuī)	4:20	
D	Nawukere Yusupujiang (那吾克热·玉素浦江)	四季 (Four seasons; Sìjì)	21:35	Liu Huyi (刘胡轶)	想去的年代 (Want to go to era; Xiǎng qù de niándài)	5:20	

The battle stage

Special performance of Liu Huan : Well water flower (井水花) - Zhao Ke (赵可) (1 of 14 song chosen by Liu Huan in the blind audition round)

Order	Contestant	Song	Score			Result
Order	Contestant	Song	Media reporter votes	Tutor votes	Final votes	Result
1	Nawukere Yusupujiang (那吾克热·玉素浦江)	四季 (Four seasons; Sìjì)	45	Wakin Chau +5	50	
2	Luo Er (裸儿)	呐喊 (Shout; Nàhǎn)	25	Liu Huan √	25	Second place
3	Ma Tiao (马条)	收获 (Harvest; Shōuhuò)	38	－	38	
4	Hanggai (杭盖乐队)	轮回 (Rebirth; Lúnhuí)	49	Yu Quan +5; Tanya Chua +5	59	First place
5	Liu Yutong (刘雨潼)	留给昨天 (Leave the yesterday; Liú gěi zuótiān)	29	－	29	

=== Episode 8 (February 20) - Wakin Chau team - "Fantasy Amusement Park" (奇幻遊樂園) ===
Episode 8 on CCTV's official YouTube channel

The composer round

- Subject : Reunion (团圆)
- Guest appearance as team captain : Jiang Yaojia (蒋瑶嘉) (Top 8 of Wakin Chau team at Sing My Song (season 1))

Room	Winner	Song	Time used (hour)	Loser	Song	Time used (hour)	Resurrection by tutor and mentor
A	Liu Runjie (刘润洁)	完整的我 (The perfection of me; Wánzhěng de wǒ)	11:04	Su Qing (苏晴)	快到碗裡來 (Come into the bowl; Kuài dào wǎn lǐ lái)	11:28	
B	Gou Naipeng (苟乃鹏)	小小 (Small small; Xiǎo xiǎo)	8:39	Eman Lam (林二汶)	只怕不够时间看你白头 (I'm afraid not enough time to see my mother's hair become white; Zhǐ pà bùgòu shíjiān kàn nǐ báitóu)	8:50	√
C	Li Ziming (黎子明)	Naomi	9:15	Zhao Zhao (昭昭)	从北到南 从南到北 (From north to south, from south to north; Cóng běi dào nán cóng nán dào běi)	9:04	
D	Dai Quan (戴荃)	老神仙 (The old fairy; Lǎo shénxiān)	11:20	Jian Mili (简迷离)	愛飛的小孩 (The children love to fly; Ài fēi de xiǎohái)	10:06	

The battle stage

Special performance of Wakin Chau : Don't polite (不客氣) - Su Qing (苏晴) (1 of 14 song chosen by Wakin Chau in the blind audition round)

Order	Contestant	Song	Score			Result
Order	Contestant	Song	Media reporter votes	Tutor votes	Final votes	Result
1	Gou Naipeng (苟乃鹏)	小小 (Small small; Xiǎo xiǎo)	51	Yu Quan +5	56	First place
2	Liu Runjie (刘润洁)	完整的我 (The perfection of me; Wánzhěng de wǒ)	41	－	41	
3	Li Ziming (黎子明)	Naomi	25	－	25	
4	Dai Quan (戴荃)	老神仙 (The old fairy; Lǎo shénxiān)	44	Liu Huan +5; Wakin Chau √	49	Second place
5	Eman Lam (林二汶)	只怕不够时间看你白头 (I'm afraid not enough time to see my mother's hair become white; Zhǐ pà bùgòu shíjiān kàn nǐ báitóu)	44	Tanya Chua +5	49	

=== Episode 9 (February 27) - Tanya Chua team - "The Universe's Heart" (心宇宙) ===
Episode 9 on CCTV's official YouTube channel

The composer round

- Subject : The most unforgettable day (最难忘的一天)
- Guest appearance as team captain : Zhou San (周三) (Top 8 of Tanya Chua team at Sing My Song (season 1))

Room	Winner	Song	Time used (hour)	Loser	Song	Time used (hour)	Resurrection by tutor and mentor
A	Chen Luoli (陈萝莉)	你安静起来 (You're suddenly silent; Nǐ ānjìng qǐlái)	11:59	Luo Zhongxu (罗中旭)	那天 (That day; Nèitiān)	10:30	
B	Su Yunying (苏运莹)	萤火虫 (Firefly; Yínghuǒchóng)	10:58	Yu Yiting (游怡婷)	发光的我 (When I shine; Fāguāng de wǒ)	8:25	
C	Qi Zitan (祁紫檀)	得知平淡珍贵的一天 (That precious dull day; Dé zhī píngdàn zhēnguì de yītiān)	7:30	Pan Gaofeng (潘高峰)	会忘了。会记得 (I will forget, I will remember; Huì wàngle. Huì jìdé)	4:06	√
D	Yu Tian (羽田)	只怪自己活该 (Blame deservedly myself; Zhǐ guài zìjǐ huógāi)	11:15	Pan Yunan (潘云安)	红 (Red; Hóng)	7:55	

The battle stage

Special performance of Tanya Chua : Time lapse (时光谣) - Wang Fanrui (王梵瑞) (1 of 14 song chosen by Tanya Chua in the blind audition round)

Order	Contestant	Song	Score			Result
Order	Contestant	Song	Media reporter votes	Tutor votes	Final votes	Result
1	Yu Tian (羽田)	只怪自己活该 (Blame deservedly myself; Zhǐ guài zìjǐ huógāi)	35	－	35	
2	Chen Luoli (陈萝莉)	你安静起来 (You're suddenly silent; Nǐ ānjìng qǐlái)	31	－	31	
3	Su Yunying (苏运莹)	萤火虫 (Firefly; Yínghuǒchóng)	45	Wakin Chau +5	50	First place
4	Qi Zitan (祁紫檀)	得知平淡珍贵的一天 (That precious dull day; Dé zhī píngdàn zhēnguì de yītiān)	43	Yu Quan +5; Tanya Chua √	48	Second place
5	Pan Gaofeng (潘高峰)	会忘了。会记得 (I will forget, I will remember; Huì wàngle. Huì jìdé)	42	Liu Huan +5	47	

=== Episode 10 (March 6) - Yu Quan team - "Colour" (颜色) ===
Episode 10 on CCTV's official YouTube channel

The composer round

- Subject : Colour (颜色)
- Guest appearance as team captain : Wang Xiaotian (王晓天) (Top 8 of Yang Kun team at Sing My Song (season 1))

Room	Winner	Song	Loser	Song	Resurrection by tutor and mentor
A	Da Fei (大飞)	寂寞的时候别唱情歌 (When be lonely don't sing the love song; Jìmò de shíhòu bié chàng qínggē)	Su Zixu (苏紫旭)	融·解 (Melt·Solution; Róng·jiě)	√
B	Lei Yuxin (雷雨心)	深海遊戲 (Games under the deep sea; Shēnhǎi yóuxì)	Wei Jiayi (魏佳艺)	N/A	
C	Wang Hongen (王宏恩)	夢想的顏色 (Dream Color; Mèngxiǎng de yánsè)	Zhu Mengdie (朱梦蝶)	N/A	
D	Xu Jun (许钧)	暖光 (Warm light; Nuǎn guāng)	Direction band (方向组合)	N/A	

The battle stage

Special performance of Yu Quan : Small gift (小礼物) - Wang Jian (王健) (1 of 14 song chosen by Yu Quan in the blind audition round)

Order	Contestant	Song	Score			Result
Order	Contestant	Song	Media reporter votes	Tutor votes	Final votes	Result
1	Da Fei (大飞)	寂寞的时候别唱情歌 (When be lonely don't sing the love song; Jìmò de shíhòu bié chàng qínggē)	46	Liu Huan +5	51	
2	Lei Yuxin (雷雨心)	深海遊戲 (Games under the deep sea; Shēnhǎi yóuxì)	42	Tanya Chua +5	47	
3	Xu Jun (许钧)	暖光 (Warm light; Nuǎn guāng)	49	Yu Quan √	49	Second place
4	Wang Hongen (王宏恩)	夢想的顏色 (Dream Color; Mèngxiǎng de yánsè)	50	Wakin Chau +5	55	First place
5	Su Zixu (苏紫旭)	融·解 (Melt·Solution; Róng·jiě)	29	－	29	

== The Final - Episode 11 (March 13) ==
Episode 11 on CCTV's official YouTube channel

=== Tutor special performance ===
Tutor / Guest	Song	Author
Liu Huan ft. Zhang Chu ft. Zhao Muyang (赵牧阳)	Ode to Gallantry (侠客行)	Zhao Muyang (赵牧阳)
Henry Huo ft. Liu Yutong (刘雨潼)	Wait the wind come (等风来)	Liu Yutong (刘雨潼)
Liu Huan ft. Liu Huyi (刘胡轶)	The slowness in the past (从前慢)	Liu Huyi (刘胡轶)
Chang Shilei ft. Yu Tian (羽田)	Make dad happy (让你幸福)	Yu Tian (羽田)
Chet Lam ft. Eman Lam	No betray till the dead (至死不渝)	Eman Lam

=== Final stage ===
At the first round, 8 performances divided into 2 turns, 4 each. Each contestant can choose the best of their 2 songs in the previous rounds to perform with their tutor or their tutor guest. After each turn, the song that won the highest live vote by audience would be advanced to final round.

At the final round, the 2 songs was voted publicly by 101 media juries. The song that won the highest vote would take the title "Best Chinese Song of the Year", that contestant would become the winner and take the final cup of Sing My Song.

Note	Wakin Chau team	Tanya Chua team	Liu Huan team	Yu Quan team

1. Gou Naipeng (苟乃鹏); Song : 小小 (ft. Richie Jen)
Xu Jun (许钧); Song : 暖光
2. Luo Er (裸儿); Song : 会飞的野马 (ft. Aska Yang)
Su Yunying (苏运莹); Song : 野子; 48 votes of 101 media juries
3. Su Yunying (苏运莹); Song : 野子 (ft. Hebe Tien)
Su Yunying (苏运莹); Song : 野子
4. Xu Jun (许钧); Song : 暖光 (ft. Julia Peng)
Hanggai (杭盖乐队); Song : 轮回; Song of the Year
5. Wang Hongen (王宏恩); Song : 夢想的顏色 (ft. Yu Quan)
Hanggai (杭盖乐队); Song : 轮回
6. Qi Zitan (祁紫檀); Song : 得知平淡珍贵的一天 (ft. Tanya Chua)
Hanggai (杭盖乐队); Song : 轮回; 53 votes of 101 media juries
7. Hanggai (杭盖乐队); Song : 轮回 (ft. Wakin Chau)
Dai Quan (戴荃); Song : 老神仙
8. Dai Quan (戴荃); Song : 老神仙 (ft. Liu Huan)

=== Top 10 Songs of Sing My Song (season 2) ===
Top 10 songs was synthesized on internet by votes of the media and the spectators. Each winner receive a blue trophy symbolized the G-clef in music.

Order	Contestant	Team	Song
1	Hanggai (杭盖乐队)	Liu Huan	Hanggai (杭盖)
2	Dai Quan (戴荃)	Wakin Chau	Wukong (悟空)
3	Su Yunying (苏运莹)	Tanya Chua	The wild child (野子)
4	Xu Jun (许钧)	Yu Quan	Self (自己)
5	Yu Tian (羽田)	Tanya Chua	Make dad happy (让你幸福)
6	Zhao Muyang (赵牧阳)	Liu Huan	Ode to Gallantry (侠客行)
7	Liu Yutong (刘雨潼)	Liu Huan	Wait the wind come (等风来)
8	Liu Huyi (刘胡轶)	Liu Huan	The slowness in the past (从前慢)
9	Eman Lam (林二汶)	Wakin Chau	No betray till the dead (至死不渝)
10	Lei Yuxin (雷雨心)	Yu Quan	Memories (记·念)

== Ratings ==
Episode	Date	Ratings	Rating share	National ranking
1	January 2, 2015	1.06	3.12	9
2	January 9, 2015	1.35	3.5	7
3	January 16, 2015	1.37	3.543	6
4	January 23, 2015	1.642	4.172	5
5	January 30, 2015	1.764	4.482	4
6	February 6, 2015	1.527	3.933	4
7	February 13, 2015	1.334	3.584	4
8	February 20, 2015	1.453	4.479	3
9	February 27, 2015	1.165	3.018	8
10	March 6, 2015	1.16	3.156	6
11	March 13, 2015	1.112	3.002	5
