= Sing My Song season 1 =

Sing My Song
- Season 1
- Hosted by: Negmat Rahman
- Judges: Yang Kun; Tanya Chua; Liu Huan; Wakin Chau
- No. of contestants: 68
- Winner: Henry Huo (霍尊)
- Winning mentor: Liu Huan
- Runner-up: Mosi Zishi (莫西子诗)

Release
- Original network: CCTV-3
- Original release: January 3 – March 21, 2014

Season chronology
- Next → Season 2

Sing My Song (season 1) was broadcast on CCTV-3 from January 3, 2014 to March 21, 2014, presented by Negmat Rahman. Yang Kun, Tanya Chua, Liu Huan and Wakin Chau were the four judges of this season. The winner was Henry Huo (霍尊) of Liu Huan team and Mosi Zishi (莫西子诗) of Yang Kun team was the runner-up.

== The Recordings ==
The blind audition stage in Sing My Song is called "The Recordings". In front of each producer, there is a lyric screen and a red control bar. If a producer pushes the bar, it means he/she is recording the song and want the song in his/her original album. The lyrics screen will then move down, allowing the producer to see the contestant on stage. This part bears resemblance to the blind auditions in The Voice.

Key	Producers pushes his or her control bar	Contestant eliminated with no producer pushing his or her control bar	Contestant defaulted to this producer's album	Contestant elected to join this producer's album	The part was not broadcast as a complete version

=== Episode 1 (January 3) ===
Episode 1 on CCTV's official YouTube channel

Order	Contestant	Song	Producer's and contestant's choices			
Order	Contestant	Song	Yang Kun	Tanya Chua	Liu Huan	Wakin Chau
1	Suby; Age 23, Taiwan	If You Believe				
2	Wang Jinlin (王矜霖); Age 23, Heilongjiang, Harbin	她妈妈不喜欢我 (Her mother doesn't like me; Ta Māma Bù Xǐhuan Wǒ)				
3	Henry Huo (霍尊); Age 23, Shanghai	卷珠帘 (Pearl-decorated curtain rolled up; Juǎn Zhū Lián)				
4	Zhou San (周三); Age 35, Yunnan, Qujing	一个歌手的情书 (A singer's love letter; Yǐ Gè Gēshǒu De Qíngshū)				
5	Yijia Tu (涂议嘉); Age 16, Sichuan, Chengdu	蒲公英在飞 (Dandelion is flying; Púgōngyīng Zài Fēi)	—			
6	Chiu Chenche / PikA Qiu (邱振哲); Age 24, Taiwan, Taichung	我不需要 (I don't need; Wǒ Bù Xūyào)				
7	Zhang Ling (张岭); Age 46, Beijing	喝酒 Blues (Drink alcohol blues; Hē Jiǔ Blues)		—		

=== Episode 2 (January 10) ===
Episode 2 on CCTV's official YouTube channel

Order	Contestant	Song	Producer's and contestant's choices			
Order	Contestant	Song	Yang Kun	Tanya Chua	Liu Huan	Wakin Chau
1	Ng Ling Kai (铃凯); Age 27, Singapore	一个人 (Alone; Yígèrén)				
2	Xie Di (谢帝); Age 24, Sichuan, Chengdu	明天不上班 (Won't go to work tomorrow; Míngtiān Bù Shàngbān)	—			—
3	Wang Xiaotian (王晓天); Age 25, Heilongjiang, Mudanjiang	再见吧 喵小姐 (Good bye miss meow; Zàijiàn ba miāo xiǎojiě)	—	—	—	—
4	Mosi Zishi (莫西子诗); Age 35, Sichuan, Daliangshan (Yi)	要死一定要死在你手里 (I want definitely die in your arms; Wǒ Yào Sǐ Yídìng Yào Sǐ Zài Nǐ Shǒu Lǐ)			—	—
5	Xin Ruotian (辛若天); Age 30, Beijing	针针扎 (Pincushion; Zhēn Zhēnzhā)	—		—	
6	Liu Jin (刘金); Age 36, Shanghai	第十一年 (Eleventh year; Dì Shíyī Nián)			—	
7	Wang Siyuan (王思远); Age 24, Liaoning, Shenyang	她 (She; Tā)			—	

=== Episode 3 (January 17) ===
Episode 3 on CCTV's official YouTube channel

Order	Contestant	Song	Producer's and contestant's choices			
Order	Contestant	Song	Yang Kun	Tanya Chua	Liu Huan	Wakin Chau
1	Jiang Yaojia (蒋瑶嘉); Age 19, Zhejiang, Huzhou	梦的堡垒 (Dream fort; Mèng De Bǎolěi)	—	—	—	
2	Liu Xiangsong (刘相松); Age 31, Shandong, Linyi	春来了 (Spring is coming; Chūn Lái Le)	—		—	—
3	Wula Duo'en (乌拉多恩); Age 33, Shandong, Jinan (Manchu)	鸟人 (Bird man; Niǎo Rén)				
4	Yang Zhongguo (杨众国); Age 24, Hebei, Chengde	悠哉 (Free and unconstrained; Yōuzāi)	—	—	—	—
5	Xiang Yahong (项亚蕻); Age 23, Zhejiang, Jinhua	伤 (Injure; Shāng)				
6	Speak Slowly Group (慢慢说组合); Taiwan	五虎 (Five tigers; Wǔ Hū)	—		—	—
7	Ma Shangyou (马上又); Age 42, Beijing	她 (She; Tā)		—		—

=== Episode 4 (January 21) ===
Episode 4 on CCTV's official YouTube channel

Order	Contestant	Song	Producer's and contestant's choices			
Order	Contestant	Song	Yang Kun	Tanya Chua	Liu Huan	Wakin Chau
—	Pai Hei Er Ding (排黑尔丁); Age 27, Xinjiang, Ürümqi	Funny Day		—		—
—	Tan Zhou (潭州); Age 31, Hunan, Changsha	你 (You; Nǐ)		—	—	—
—	Ha Xiaoma (蛤小蟆); Age 24, Shanghai	胖子的漂浮 (Floating fat; Pàngzi de piāofú)	—		—	—
—	Sun Yanran (孙嫣然); Age 27, Shanghai	我的人生 (My life; Wǒ de rénshēng)	—		—	
—	Chen Hanwen (陈翰文); Age 26, Fujian	给你们的歌 (Tell your song; Gěi nǐmen de gē)			—	—
—	Du Qiu (杜秋); Age 31, Guangdong, Guangzhou	某某 (Certain; Mǒu mǒu)		—	—	—
—	Xie Hui (谢晖); Age 36, Jiangxi	如果爱死去 (If your love dead; Rúguǒ ài sǐqù)		—	—	—
—	Wanban Er Zuhe (玩伴儿组合)	王 (King; Wáng)	—			
1	Su Dan (苏丹); Age 26, Shaanxi, Xi'an	寂静森林 (Silent forest; Jìjìng sēnlín)			—	
2	Sha Zhou (沙洲); Age 26, Shandong, Qingdao	挖蛤蜊 (Digging clams; Wā gélí)		—	—	—
3	Zhao Lei (赵雷); Age 27, Beijing	画 (Paint; Huà)	—	—		—
4	Miao Xiaoqing (苗小青); Age 26, Inner Mongolia, Horqin grassland	海的对岸有个你 (In the other side of the sea are you; Hǎi de duì'àn yǒu gè nǐ)	—	—	—	
5	Hui Zi (灰子); Age 40, Gansu, Lanzhou	灰鸟 (Gray birds; Huī niǎo)		—	—	
6	Mr. Miss; Age 34 and 24, Beijing	先生小姐那些事 (Those things of Mr. and Miss; Xiānshēng xiǎojiě nàxiē shì)	—	—		—
7	Liu Bokuan (刘博宽); Age 27, Shaanxi, Xianyang	8+8=8	—		—	—
—	Wu Ji (吴极); Age 31, Shanghai	灯火 (Lights; Dēnghuǒ)			—	—
—	Wang Zi (王子); Age 25, Zhejiang, Hangzhou	思念一个人 (Missing someone; Sīniàn yīgè rén)	—	—		—
—	A Si (阿肆); Age 25, Shanghai	别告诉妈妈我失恋了 (Don't tell my mother, I want to take it; Bié gàosù māmā wǒ shīliànle)	—	—		—
—	Guo Yifan (郭一凡); Age 26, Shanghai	停留 (Remain; Tíngliú)	—		—	
8	Liu Chongyan (柳重言); Age 50, Hong Kong	空白的缘分 (Blank fate; Kòngbái de yuánfèn)		—	—	

=== Episode 5 (January 28) ===
Episode 5 on CCTV's official YouTube channel

Order	Contestant	Song	Producer's and contestant's choices			
Order	Contestant	Song	Yang Kun	Tanya Chua	Liu Huan	Wakin Chau
—	Chase Chang (張傑); Age 32, Taiwan, Taipei	我只是想写一首开心的歌 (I just wanted to write a happy song; Wǒ zhǐshì xiǎng xiě yī shǒu kāixīn de gē)	—	—	—	
—	Yang Jionghan (杨炅翰); Age 27, Shandong, Zaozhuang	那里是哪里 (Where is there; Nàlǐ shì nǎlǐ)	—	—		—
—	Tang Mohan (唐茉菡); Age 28, Guangxi	美梦成真 (A dream come true; Měimèng chéng zhēn)	—	—		—
—	Chen Yuan (陈媛); Age 24, Fujian, Quanzhou	带我走好吗 (Please take me away; Dài wǒ zǒu hǎo ma)	—	—		
—	Ding Yu (丁钰); Age 27, Jiangxi, Nanchang	老包 (The old package; Lǎo bāo)			—	—
—	Wang Qingpeng (王青鹏); Age 23, Hebei, Cangzhou	棒三狗 (Stick three dogs; Bàng sān gǒu)				
—	Lei Gang (雷刚); Age 41, Beijing	永远年轻 (Forever young; Yǒngyuǎn niánqīng)	—	—	—	
—	Jin Wenqi (金玟岐); Age 27, Jiangxi, Yingtan	爱呀 (Love it; Ài ya)		—	—	
—	Li Wei (李巍); Age 25, Hunan, Yueyang	高点 (High point; Gāo diǎn)	—		—	
—	Wu Qiong (吴琼); Age 31, Hebei, Baoding	献给爱丽丝 (Offer to Alice; Xiàn gěi àilì sī)	—		—	
1	Dewen and flip flop (Dewen和拖鞋); Age 21 and 22, Shanghai	开挂侠 (Man hanging open; Kāi guà xiá)				
2	Hu Shasha(胡莎莎); Age 26, Tianjin	唱念爱 (Singing for love; Chàng niàn ài)			—	
3	Zhao Zhao (赵照); Age 34, Shandong, Liaocheng	当你老了 (When you are old; Dāng nǐ lǎole)				
4	Lu Xianghui (鲁向卉); Age 22, Hebei, Hengshui	鱼儿 (Fish child; Yú er)			—	
5	Tang Xiaokang (汤小康); Age 38, Malaysia	法国老画家 (Old french painter; Fàguó lǎo huàjiā)	—			—
6	Su Peiqing (苏佩卿); Age 30, Taiwan, Taipei	格格不入 (Incompatible with; Gégébùrù)	—	—		—
7	Zhang Ludi (张禄籴); Age 29, Tianjin	安眠药 (Sleeping pills; Ānmiányào)		—	—	—
8	Song Yuanyuan (宋媛媛); Age 28, Liaoning, Shenyang	I am yes I am no				

=== Episode 6 (February 7) ===
Episode 6 on CCTV's official YouTube channel

Order	Contestant	Song	Producer's and contestant's choices			
Order	Contestant	Song	Yang Kun	Tanya Chua	Liu Huan	Wakin Chau
—	Lu Weiqing (吕纬青); Age 31, Taiwan	光的版图 (Map of lights; Guāng de bǎntú)		FULL	—	—
—	Yang Hanqi (杨含奇); Age 32, Shanghai	港湾 (Harbour; Gǎngwān)	—	FULL		—
—	Xi Er (玺儿); Age 30, Guiyang	无尽的旅途 (Endless journey; Wújìn de lǚtú)		FULL	—	—
Revival round
1	Wang Fei (王飞); Age 36, Shenzhen	城堡 (Castle; Chéngbǎo)	—	FULL	—	—
2	Panther Chan (陈蕾); Age 24, Guangzhou	谁搞的情人节 (Who has created the Valentine's day; Shuí gǎo de qíngrén jié)		FULL	—	
3	Lao Qian (老钱); Age 43, Shaanxi, Xi'an	今天我疯了 (Today I'm crazy; Jīntiān wǒ fēngle)		FULL	—	
4	Jin Hu (金虎); Age 27, Beijing	爱一直都在 (Love has been in there; Ài yīzhí dōu zài)	—	FULL	—	FULL
5	Li Xia(李夏); Age 32, Ningxia, Yinchuan	今宵列车 (Tonight train; Jīnxiāo lièchē)		FULL		FULL
6	Wang Xiaotian (王晓天); Age 25, Heilongjiang, Mudanjiang	再见吧 喵小姐 (Good bye miss meow; Zàijiàn ba miāo xiǎojiě)		FULL	FULL	FULL

== The Singles ==
The battle stage in Sing My Song is called "The Singles". After the audition rounds, each tutor has chosen 16 songs, and now they must have again selected 8 of 16 songs to play in this battle round. On each day, the 51 media juries have given a score by live votes (1 vote = 1 point) for each song after each contestant performance. After 8 performances of that day, the 3 others team tutors, each could give 5 points for only one contestant they wanted. The first song that won the highest score and the second song was selected by their team tutor would become two main songs of their tutor album, and that two contestants have represented their team to perform on the final stage.

=== Episode 7 (February 21) - Liu Huan team - "Nine New Beat" (新九拍) ===
Episode 7 on CCTV's official YouTube channel

Order	Contestant	Song	Score			Result
Order	Contestant	Song	Media reporter votes	Tutor votes	Final votes	Result
1	Wang Jinlin (王矜霖)	她妈妈不喜欢我 (Her mother doesn't like me; Ta Māma Bù Xǐhuan Wǒ)	43	－	43	
2	Li Xia (李夏)	午夜快车 (Midnight express; Wǔyè kuàichē) 今宵列车 (former title) (Tonight train; Jīnxiāo lièchē)	30	－	30	
3	Zhao Lei (赵雷)	画 (Paint; Huà)	37	－	37	
4	Henry Huo (霍尊)	卷珠帘 (Pearl-decorated curtain rolled up; Juǎn Zhū Lián)	42	Wakin Chau +5; Liu Huan √	47^{+}	Second place
5	Yijia Tu (涂议嘉)	蒲公英在飞 (Dandelion is flying; Púgōngyīng Zài Fēi)	33	－	33	
6	Su Peiqing (苏佩卿)	格格不入 (Incompatible with; Gégébùrù)	24	－	24	
7	Zhang Ling (张岭)	喝酒 Blues (Drink alcohol blues; Hē Jiǔ Blues)	47	Yang Kun +5	52	First place
8	Wula Dou'en (乌拉多恩)	鸟人 (Bird man; Niǎo Rén)	42	Tanya Chua +5	47	

+ "卷珠帘" of Henry Huo have the same final score with "鸟人" of Wula Dou'en but he won the second place by the choice of Liu Huan, their team tutor.

=== Episode 8 (February 28) - Wakin Chau team - "New Wild Energy" (江湖新能量) ===
Episode 8 on CCTV's official YouTube channel

Order	Contestant	Song	Score			Result
Order	Contestant	Song	Media reporter votes	Tutor votes	Final votes	Result
1	Jiang Yaojia (蒋瑶嘉)	梦的堡垒 (Dream fort; Mèng De Bǎolěi)	20	－	20	
2	Xin Ruotian (辛若天)	针针扎 (Pincushion; Zhēn Zhēnzhā)	36	－	36	
3	Hu Shasha (胡莎莎)	唱念爱 (Singing for love; Chàng niàn ài)	27	－	27	
4	Wang Siyuan (王思远)	她 (She; Tā)	38	Liu Huan +5; Yang Kun +5; Wakin Chau √	48	Second place
5	Qiu Zhenzhe (邱振哲)	我不需要 (I don't need; Wǒ Bù Xūyào)	39	－	39	
6	Xiang Yahong (项亚蕻)	伤 (Injure; Shāng)	48	Tanya Chua +5	53	First place
7	Lu Xianghui (鲁向卉)	鱼儿 (Fish child; Yú er)	34	－	34	
8	Lao Qian (老钱)	今天我疯了 (Today I'm crazy; Jīntiān wǒ fēngle)	35	－	35	

=== Episode 9 (March 7) - Yang Kun team - "Into A New Era" (走进心时代) ===
Episode 9 on CCTV's official YouTube channel

Order	Contestant	Song	Score			Result
Order	Contestant	Song	Media reporter votes	Tutor votes	Final votes	Result
1	Suby	If You Believe	30	－	30	
2	Ma Shangyou (马上又)	她 (She; Tā)	48	Wakin Chau +5; Yang Kun √	53	Second place
3	Mosi Zishi (莫西子诗)	要死一定要死在你手里 (I want definitely die in your arms; Wǒ Yào Sǐ Yídìng Yào Sǐ Zài Nǐ Shǒu Lǐ)	50	Tanya Chua +5	55	First place
4	Wang Xiaotian (王晓天)	再见吧 喵小姐 (Good bye miss meow; Zàijiàn ba miāo xiǎojiě)	41	－	41	
5	Liu Chongyan (柳重言)	空白的缘分 (Blank fate; Kòngbái de yuánfèn)	34	Liu Huan +5	39	
6	Hui Zi (灰子)	灰鸟 (Gray birds; Huī niǎo)	31	－	31	
7	Lu Weiqing (吕纬青)	光的版图 (Map of lights; Guāng de bǎntú)	22	－	22	
8	Xi Er (玺儿)	无尽的旅途 (Endless journey; Wújìn de lǚtú)	45	－	45	

=== Episode 10 (March 14) - Tanya Chua team - "Life Taste" (美味人生) ===
Episode 10 on CCTV's official YouTube channel

Order	Contestant	Song	Score			Result
Order	Contestant	Song	Media reporter votes	Tutor votes	Final votes	Result
1	Liu Xiangsong (刘相松)	春来了 (Spring is coming; Chūn Lái Le)	38	－	38	
2	Xie Di (谢帝)	明天不上班 (Won't go to work tomorrow; Míngtiān Bù Shàngbān)	39	Wakin Chau +5; Tanya Chua √	44	Second place
3	Zhao Zhao (赵照)	当你老了 (When you are old; Dāng nǐ lǎole)	49	－	49	
4	Zhou San (周三)	周三的情书 (Zhou San's love letter; Zhōusān de qíngshū) 一个歌手的情书 (former title) (A singer's love letter; Yǐgè Gēshǒu De Qíngshū)	41	－	41	
5	Ng Ling Kai (铃凯)	一个人 (Alone; Yígèrén)	48	Liu Huan +5; Yang Kun +5	58	First place
6	Song Yuanyuan (宋媛媛)	I Am Yes I Am No	16	－	16	
7	Speak Slowly Group (慢慢说组合)	五虎 (Five tigers; Wǔ Hū)	30	－	30	
8	Liu Bokuan (刘博宽)	8+8=8	38	－	38	

== Episode 11 (March 21) - The Song ==
Episode 11 on CCTV's official YouTube channel

The final stage in Sing My Song is called "The Song".

=== Tutor special performance ===
Tutor	Song	Author		
Tutor	Song	Lyric	Music	Arranger
Yang Kun	Tonight I'm 20 (今夜二十岁)	Lin Xi	Yang Kun	Song Rui (宋睿)
Liu Huan	Night (夜)	Liu Huan	Liu Huan	Lao Zi (捞仔)
Tanya Chua	We Are One	Xiaohan	Tanya Chua	Peng Fei (彭飞)
Wakin Chau	Tattoo (纹身) (ft. Hu Shasha)	Zhang Dachun	Wakin Chau	Dai Quan (戴荃)

=== Final stage ===
At the first round, 8 performances divided into 2 turns, 4 each. Each song was performed by contestant with their tutor or their tutor guest. After each turn, the song that won the highest live vote by audience would be advanced to final round.

At the final round, the 2 songs was voted publicly by 101 media juries. The song that won the highest vote would take the title "Best Chinese Song of the Year", that contestant would become the winner and take the final cup of Sing My Song.

Note	Wakin Chau team	Tanya Chua team	Liu Huan team	Yang Kun team

1. Xiang Yahong (项亚蕻); Song : 伤 (ft. Yu Quan)
2. Xie Di (谢帝); Song : 明天不上班 (ft. Tanya Chua)
Henry Huo (霍尊); Song : 卷珠帘; 52 votes of 101 media juries
3. Henry Huo (霍尊); Song : 卷珠帘 (ft. Fei Yu-ching)
4. Ma Shangyou (马上又); Song : 她 (ft. Yang Kun)
Henry Huo (霍尊); Song : 卷珠帘; Song of the Year
5. Mosi Zishi (莫西子诗); Song : 要死就一定要死在你手里 (ft. Zheng Jun)
6. Wang Siyuan (王思远); Song : 她 (ft. Wakin Chau)
Mosi Zishi (莫西子诗); Song : 要死就一定要死在你手里; 49 votes of 101 media juries
7. Ng Ling Kai (铃凯); Song : 一个人 (ft. Wu Tsing-Fong)
8. Zhang Ling (张岭); Song : 喝酒Blues (ft. Liu Huan)

== Ratings ==
Episode	Date	Time	Rating	National ranking
1	3 January 2014	8:30-10:00 PM	2.513	1
2	10 January 2014	8:30-10:00 PM	2.542	1
3	17 January 2014	8:30-10:00 PM	2.621	1
4	24 January 2014	8:30-10:00 PM	2.159	1
5	31 January 2014	8:30-10:00 PM	2.125	1
6	7 February 2014	8:30-10:00 PM	1.933	2
－	14 February 2014	Haven't taken place because of the Lantern Festival.		
7	21 February 2014	8:30-10:00 PM	1.869	3
8	28 February 2014	8:30-10:00 PM	1.356	4
9	7 January 2014	8:30-10:00 PM	1.525	3
10	14 January 2014	8:30-10:00 PM	1.442	4
11	21 March 2014	8:30-10:00 PM	1.815	3

The data determined by CSM.
