= Sing My Song =

- Intertitle
- 中国好歌曲; Zhōngguó Hǎo Gēqǔ
- Genre: Reality television
- Created by: Jin Lei
- Presented by: Yang Fan (season 3); Negmat Rahman (seasons 1–2); Li Jiaming (season 2)
- Judges: Liu Huan (seasons 1–3); Yu Quan (seasons 2–3); David Tao (season 3); Mavis Fan (season 3); Yang Kun (season 1); Wakin Chau (seasons 1–2); Tanya Chua (seasons 1–2)
- Country of origin: China
- Original language: Mandarin
- No. of seasons: 3

Production
- Running time: By episode

Original release
- Network: CCTV-3 (Arts and Entertainment)
- Release: January 3, 2014 – April 8, 2016

Sing My Song (Chinese: 中国好歌曲; pinyin: Zhōngguó Hǎo Gēqǔ) is a Chinese reality talent show that premiered on 3 January 2014 on CCTV-3 (Arts and Entertainment) channel sponsored by Hangzhou Wahaha Group and Wahaha Joint Venture Company. The series is produced by the same team that produced The Voice of China and retains some of that show's format; however, a major difference is that contestants in Sing My Song must perform their original composition rather than covering songs by other artists.

== Format ==
The series consists of three phases: the audition called "the recordings", a battle phase called "the singles", and a final called "the song". The four producers choose teams of contestants through a blind audition process. Each producer has the length of the auditioner's performance to decide if he or she wants that singer-songwriter's self-written, composed, and song sung on his or her album. If two or more producers want the same contestant (which happens frequently), the singer-songwriter has the final choice of producer.

== Overview ==
=== Tutors ===
Tutor	Season		
Tutor	1	2	3
Liu Huan			
Wakin Chau			
Tanya Chua			
Yang Kun			
Yu Quan			
Mavis Fan			
David Tao			

=== Finalists of each team ===
- Note: The green background is the winning team, and the champion is bold.

Season	Finalists			
1	Yang Kun	Tanya Chua	Liu Huan	Wakin Chau
1	Mosi Zishi (莫西子诗); Ma Shangyou (马上又)	Ng Ling Kai (铃凯); Xie Di (谢帝)	Henry Huo (霍尊); Zhang Ling (张岭)	Xiang Yahong (项亚蕻); Wang Siyuan (王思远)
2	Yu Quan	Tanya Chua	Liu Huan	Wakin Chau
2	Wang Hongen (王宏恩); Xu Jun (许钧)	Su Yunying (苏运莹); Qi Zitan (祁紫檀)	Hanggai (杭盖乐队); Luo Er (裸儿)	Gou Naipeng (苟乃鹏); Dai Quan (戴荃)
3	Yu Quan	Mavis Fan	Liu Huan	David Tao
3	He Jiale (何佳乐); Man Jiang (满江)	AR	Mountain People band (山人乐队); Ceng Zhaowei (曾昭玮)	Wang Wu (王兀)

== Season ==
Diagram	Wakin Chau team	Tanya Chua team	Liu Huan team	Yang Kun team	Yu Quan team	Mavis Fan team	David Tao team

Season	Start Date	End Date	Winner	Runner-up	Finalists	Winning tutor	Host
1	January 3, 2014	March 21, 2014	Henry Huo (霍尊)	Mosi Zishi (莫西子诗)	Xie Di (谢帝)	Liu Huan	Negmat Rahman
1	January 3, 2014	March 21, 2014	Henry Huo (霍尊)	Mosi Zishi (莫西子诗)	Wang Siyuan (王思远)	Liu Huan	Negmat Rahman
2	January 2, 2015	March 13, 2015	Hanggai (杭盖乐队)	Su Yunying (苏运莹)	Dai Quan (戴荃)	Liu Huan	Negmat Rahman (Episodes 1 - 6); Li Jiaming (李佳明) (Episodes 7 - End)
2	January 2, 2015	March 13, 2015	Hanggai (杭盖乐队)	Su Yunying (苏运莹)	Xu Jun (许钧)	Liu Huan	Negmat Rahman (Episodes 1 - 6); Li Jiaming (李佳明) (Episodes 7 - End)
3	January 29, 2016	April 8, 2016	Mountain People band (山人乐队)	Wang Wu (王兀)	AR	Liu Huan	Yang Fan (杨帆)
3	January 29, 2016	April 8, 2016	Mountain People band (山人乐队)	Wang Wu (王兀)	Man Jiang (满江)	Liu Huan	Yang Fan (杨帆)
3	January 29, 2016	April 8, 2016	Mountain People band (山人乐队)	Wang Wu (王兀)	He Jiale (何佳乐)	Liu Huan	Yang Fan (杨帆)
3	January 29, 2016	April 8, 2016	Mountain People band (山人乐队)	Wang Wu (王兀)	Ceng Zhaowei (曾昭玮)	Liu Huan	Yang Fan (杨帆)

== International versions ==
=== United Kingdom ===
In April 2014 UK's ITV announced that there would be a British version of Sing My Song, The British Song. It is the first time that a British television network bought the distribution originally from China.

=== Vietnam ===
In 2016, there was a Vietnamese version of Sing My Song, named Sing My Song Vietnam. It was produced by Cattiensa Media and aired on VTV3. The first season of the program was broadcast from November 20, 2016 to January 22, 2017.

== See also ==
- Sing My Song (season 1)
- Sing My Song (season 2)
- Sing My Song (season 3)
