= Asian Wave =

2012 Chinese reality singing talent show

- Hosted by: Lin Hai (林海)
- Judges: (China) Sun Nan (China) Gao Xiaosong (Hong Kong) Alan Tam (Hong Kong) Hacken Lee (Taiwan) Chyi Chin (Taiwan) Jerry Huang (黃舒駿) (Taiwan) Phil Chang (Malaysia) Eric Moo (Malaysia) Penny Tai (South Korea) Lee Min-woo (Japan) Lisa Ono (Thailand) Pang Prakasit Bosuwan (India) Anaida; Note: not all judges are present in any given episode
- No. of contestants: 66 (Greater China region); 24 (Asian region, including 6 from Greater China)
- Winner: (Malaysia) Shila Amzah
- Finals venue: Baoshan Sports Center, Shanghai, China

Release
- Original network: Dragon Television
- Original release: 11 July – 20 September 2012

Asian Wave
- Traditional Chinese: 聲動亞洲
- Simplified Chinese: 声动亚洲
- Literal meaning: Voices Moving Asia
Transcriptions
Standard Mandarin
- Hanyu Pinyin: Shēng Dòng Yàzhōu

Asian Wave is a 2012 Chinese reality singing talent show featuring contestants from many different Asian countries. The show premiered on 11 July 2012 on Dragon Television.

On 20 September 2012, Malaysian singer-songwriter Shila Amzah won the competition by unanimous vote, after performing 3 songs (in the final rounds) in 3 languages (Malay, English and Mandarin).

== Format ==
The first 16 episodes, first shown between 11 July 2012 and 30 August 2012, feature competitions amongst 66 Greater China contestants (including music groups). Competition was so strong that established singer Fiona Fung from Hong Kong failed to reach even the Final 16. In the end, the 6 finalists were selected (in order of finish):

1. (China) Chang Shilei
2. (China) Sun Bolun (孙伯纶)
3. (Taiwan) Liang Yi-chen (梁一貞)
4. (China) Guo Yifan (郭一凡)
5. (China) Henry Huo
6. (China) Yu Chaoying (余超颖) & Guo Meizi (郭美孜)

They qualified to the Asian Region contest for a chance to compete with 18 contestants from the rest of Asia.

- (India) Anirudh Bhola
- (India) Priyanka Negi & Bhavin Dhanak
- (India) Tia Kar
- (Japan) Flow
- (Japan) Emi Tawata
- (Malaysia) Shila Amzah
- (Malaysia) Athena Beh (马嘉轩)
- (Malaysia) Lau Wan Yin (刘婉滢)
- (Singapore) By2
- (Singapore) Rachel Chua (蔡艾珈)
- (Singapore) Kelvin Tan
- (South Korea) 7942
- (South Korea) Cross Gene
- (South Korea) ZE:A
- (South Korea) Whee (휘)
- (Thailand) Techin Chayuti (จิรัฐชัย ชยุติ)
- (Thailand) Ten Nararak (นรารักษ์ ใจบำรุง)
- (Thailand) Ploy (พลอย) & Gun Achi (กัน อชิ)

== Preliminary rounds ==
The preliminary rounds of the Asian-wide competition consist of 6 episodes and were first aired from 3 September 2012 to 19 September 2012.

In each group of 8 contestants, 4 will advance to the final rounds.

In Round 1, eight contestants are divided into 4 pairs, with the 4 winners directly advancing to Round 2. Then the judges do a second round of voting to determine the best 2 contestants among the 4 losers. Then, the remaining 2 contestants do a 30-second a cappella battle to determine the last contestant to advance.

In Round 2, the 4 winners from Round 1 are divided into 2 pairs, with the 2 winners directly advancing to the final rounds. Then the judges do a second round of voting to determine the better contestant between the 2 losers. Later, the best contestant from the 3 losers from Round 1 does a 30-second a cappella battle with the remaining winner from Round 1, to determine the last contestant to advance.

Key	Directly advanced by winning battle	Advanced by judges' selection	Advanced by winning the a cappella battle

=== Group one ===
Round 1

Pair	Contestant	Song	Result
A	(India) Tia Kar	"Chikni Chameli" _{originally by Shreya Ghoshal}	
A	(Taiwan) Liang Yi-chen	"拒绝再玩" _{originally by Leslie Cheung}	
B	(Singapore) Kelvin Tan	"火柴天堂" _{originally by Hsiung Tien-ping}	
B	(Malaysia) Lau Wan Yin	"Bukan Cinta Biasa" _{originally by Siti Nurhaliza}	
C	(South Korea) 7942	"Paradise" _{originally by T-max}	Eliminated by Techin Chayuti
C	(South Korea) Cross Gene	"La-Di Da-Di" _{own song}	
D	(China) Henry Huo	"茉莉花 (Mo Li Hua)" _{folk song}	
D	(Thailand) Techin Chayuti	"ปวดร้าวเท่าๆกัน" _{own song}	

Round 2

Group	Contestant	Song	Result
A	(China) Henry Huo	"それぞれに" _{originally by Kousuke Atari}	
A	(Taiwan) Liang Yi-chen	"Rolling in the Deep" _{originally by Adele}	
B	(Malaysia) Lau Wan Yin	"寂寞先生" _{originally by Gary Chaw}	
B	(South Korea) Cross Gene	"My Love" _{originally by Westlife}	
C	(Thailand) Techin Chayuti	"千里之外" _{originally by Jay Chou}	Eliminated
C	(Singapore) Kelvin Tan	"You Raise Me Up" _{originally by Brian Kennedy}	Won the group battle but eliminated by Henry Huo
C	(India) Tia Kar	"Unfaithful" _{originally by Rihanna}	Eliminated

=== Group two ===
Round 1

Pair	Contestant	Song	Result
A	(Malaysia) Shila Amzah	"Set Fire to the Rain" _{originally by Adele}	
A	(Singapore) Rachel Chua	"傻瓜" _{originally by Landy Wen}	
B	(China) Sun Bolun	"洋葱" _{originally by Ding Dang}	
B	(India) Anirudh Bhola	"Bhaag D.K. Bose" _{originally by Ram Sampath}	
C	(Thailand) Ploy & Achi	"แทงข้างหลัง ทะลุถึงหัวใจ" _{originally by Aof Pongsak}	Eliminated by Anirudh Bhola
C	(South Korea) ZE:A	"Mazeltov" _{own song}	
D	(Japan) Emi Tawata	"Musing" _{own song}	
D	(China) Chang Shilei	"人间" _{originally by Faye Wong}	

Round 2

Group	Contestant	Song	Result
A	(South Korea) ZE:A	"2 in the Morning" _{originally by New Kids on the Block} "The Way I Are" _{originally by Timbaland}	Decided to forfeit against Chang Shilei
A	(China) Sun Bolun	"爱我还是他" _{originally by David Tao}	
B	(Malaysia) Shila Amzah	"Forever Love" _{originally by Leehom Wang}	
B	(Japan) Emi Tawata	"I'll Be There"_{originally by The Jackson 5}	
C	(India) Anirudh Bhola	"Maa Da Ladla" _{originally by Master Saleem}	Eliminated
C	(Singapore) Rachel Chua	"I Surrender" _{originally by Celine Dion}	Eliminated
C	(China) Chang Shilei	"对你爱不完" _{originally by Aaron Kwok}	

=== Group three ===
Round 1

Pair	Contestant	Song	Result
A	(India) Priyanka Negi & Bhavin Dhanak	"Subha Hone Na De" _{originally by Mika Singh & Shefali Alvares}	
A	(Singapore) By2	"When You Believe" _{originally by Mariah Carey & Whitney Houston}	
B	(Malaysia) Athena Beh	"我是一只小小鸟" _{originally by Chief Chao}	Eliminated by By2
B	(South Korea) Whee	"너와 결혼할 사람" _{own song}	
C	(China) Guo Meizi & Yu Chaoying	"Tell Him" _{originally by Barbra Streisand & Celine Dion}	
C	(Thailand) Ten Nararak	"อย่าปล่อยให้คนคนนึงคิดถึงเธอ" _{own song}	
D	(China) Guo Yifan	"Give Me One Reason" _{originally by Tracy Chapman}	
D	(Japan) Flow	"Go!!!"_{own song}	

Round 2

Group	Contestant	Song	Result
A	(India) Priyanka Negi & Bhavin Dhanak	"Just a Kiss" _{originally by Lady Antebellum}	See below
A	(China) Guo Yifan	"够了" _{own song}	
B	(China) Guo Meizi & Yu Chaoying	"最爱我的人伤我最深" _{originally by A-mei & Chang Yu-sheng}	See below
B	(South Korea) Whee	"You Give Love a Bad Name" _{originally by Bon Jovi}	
C	(Singapore) By2	"DNA" _{own song}	Eliminated
C	(Thailand) Ten Nararak	"Listen" _{originally by Beyoncé Knowles}	
C	(Japan) Flow	"Surfin' U.S.A."_{originally by The Beach Boys}	Eliminated

Extra battle: judges could not decide between the Indian duo and the Chinese duo who both lost their first battle in Round 2.

Contestant	Song	Result
(India) Priyanka Negi & Bhavin Dhanak	"Character Dheela" _{originally by Neeraj Shridhar & Amrita Kak}	
(China) Guo Meizi & Yu Chaoying	"她在睡前哭泣" _{originally by Mindy Quah & Coco Lee}	After the song, Guo Meizi decided to withdraw citing health reasons while Yu Chaoying was eliminated by Ten Nararak

== Final rounds ==
The final 3 rounds were broadcast live on 20 September 2012. Before the competition, some of the previously eliminated contestants performed; as well as invitees Jam Hsiao from Taiwan and Michael Wong from Malaysia.

Likely due to the violent anti-Japanese demonstrations in China at the time, Japan's Emi Tawata and South Korea's Cross Gene (which includes a Japanese member) had to withdraw from the final rounds. As a result, only 10 of the originally selected 12 finalists remain, and after Round 1 the judges do a second round of voting to select one of the five battle losers to advance to Round 2.

Key	Directly advanced by winning battle	Advanced by judges' selection

Round 1

Pair	Contestant	Song	Result
A	(Taiwan) Liang Yi-chen	"I Hate Myself for Loving You" _{originally by Joan Jett}	Eliminated
A	(China) Chang Shilei	"high歌" _{own song; although originally by Huang Ling}	
B	(Malaysia) Lau Wan Yin	"让每个人都心碎" _{originally by Huang Dawei}	
B	(China) Guo Yifan	"画心" _{originally by Jane Zhang}	
C	(China) Henry Huo	"醒" _{own song}	
C	(South Korea) Whee	"잠시만 안녕" _{originally by MC the Max}	Eliminated
D	(China) Sun Bolun	"没离开过" _{originally by Terry Lin}	
D	(India) Priyanka Negi & Bhavin Dhanak	"Jai Ho" & "Jai Ho (You Are My Destiny)" _{music by A. R. Rahman} "最炫民族风" _{originally by Phoenix Legend}	Eliminated
E	(Malaysia) Shila Amzah	"Gemilang" _{originally by Jaclyn Victor}	
E	(Thailand) Ten Nararak	"I Will Always Love You" _{originally by Dolly Parton}	Eliminated

Round 2

Pair	Contestant	Song	Result
A	(China) Chang Shilei	"Hero" _{originally by Mariah Carey}	
A	(Malaysia) Lau Wan Yin	"Picture to Burn" _{originally by Taylor Swift}	Eliminated
B	(China) Henry Huo	"我的城" _{originally by Chang Shilei}	
B	(China) Sun Bolun	"一无所有" _{originally by Cui Jian}	Eliminated
C	(Malaysia) Shila Amzah	"Grenade" _{originally by Bruno Mars}	
C	(China) Guo Yifan	"If I Ain't Got You" _{originally by Alicia Keys}	Eliminated

Round 3

Contestant	Song
(China) Chang Shilei	"Bad Romance" _{originally by Lady Gaga}
(China) Henry Huo	"记得" _{originally by A-mei}
(Malaysia) Shila Amzah	"征服" _{originally by Na Ying}

== International broadcasting ==
Country / Region	Channel	Airing
Malaysia	Astro Zhi Zun HD	6 October 2012
Singapore	E City	8 October 2012

== See also ==
- Voice of Asia
- Asia New Singer Competition
