= CCTV-3 =

CCTV television channel dedicated to the arts

CCTV-3 综艺
- Country: China
- Broadcast area: China

Programming
- Picture format: 1080i HDTV (downscaled to 576i for the SD feed)

Ownership
- Owner: China Central Television

History
- Launched: 1 January 1986
- Former names: China Central Television Channel 3 (1986.1.1-1995.11.29, 1999.8.30-2000.12.17), China Central Television Literature and Art Channel (1995.11.30-1996.1.14), China Central Television Opera and Music Channel (1996.1.15-1999.8.29)

Links
- Website: CCTV-3

Availability

Streaming media
- CCTV program website: CCTV-3

CCTV-3 is the art focused channel of the CCTV (China Central Television) Network in the People's Republic of China. As of 1994, it was receivable in 13% of Guangzhou. Since November 30, 1995, the channel has focused mainly on dance and music broadcasts.

== Channel Positioning ==
From its inception in 1986 to 2000, the channel specialized in foreign programming and theatrical plays.

CCTV-3 now has a set of entertainment, participation, and appreciation in a "new audio-visual" column to the broad masses of love art audience provides free choice space. To create high-quality column, the purpose of CCTV-3 is to strengthen the program services, entertainment, nationality, participatory, art and the mass, fusion variety, music, information service, literature, dance and other arts programs as a whole.

== Prominent hosts ==
- Li Yong
- Zhou Yu
- Bi Fujian
- Dong Qing
- Li Sisi

== Prominent Performers and Guests ==
- G.E.M
- Feixiang
- Daniela Anahi Bessia
- TFBoys

== Shows ==
- Ding Ge Long Dong Qiang
- Sing My Song
- Dance World
- Art Life
- Xingguang Dadao
- Super 6+1
