= Peter Schloss =

Corporate lawyer

Peter Schloss is one of the pioneers of satellite television in Asia and a corporate lawyer and media and entertainment executive in China. He is a founding member of the senior management team of STAR TV and specializes in digital media, sports and entertainment. As managing partner and chief executive officer of Castle Hill Partners, he has been involved in some of the most significant and high-profile cross-border media, sports and entertainment investment and advisory transactions in Asia. In 2006 and 2007 he was named by Asia Law and Business as one of the top in-house lawyers in China and one of the top in-house lawyers in Asia. He was also named one of the ALB Hot 100 Lawyers in Asia in 2006. In addition to Castle Hill Partners, he is a senior partner in the Phoenix TV Media Fund L.P., a private equity fund established by the Phoenix Television Group (HKSE: 2008) and the Liu family, and an independent director and audit committee chairman of YY Inc. (Nasdaq: YY) and an independent director of Zhao pin Limited (NYSE: ZPIN). He was previously an independent director and audit committee chairman of Giant Interactive (NYSE: GA) from 2007-2014.

== Major League Baseball, English Premier League, German Bundesliga ==
Schloss was a co-founder of Allied Pacific Sports Network, or APSN, and was its chief executive officer from 2009 to 2012. APSN was one of the earliest over-the-top contents OTT companies in Asia and one of the largest providers of live and on-demand sports over the internet in Asia, streaming more than 5,000 hours of live sports in 2011. APSN was sold to Link tone (Nasdaq: LTON). APSN operated websites and streamed live soccer matches of the English Premier League, German Bundesliga and the Brasileiro Campeonato Serie A. APSN also operated the MLB China and MLBKorea.com websites in an exclusive partnership with Major League Baseball Advanced Media in China, Korea, Hong Kong, Macau, Singapore, Thailand, Indonesia, the Philippines and Vietnam. In 2010 APSN also operated websites for the National Hockey League (NHL) in Japan, Korea, China, Taiwan, Hong Kong and Macau and provided live and on-demand streaming over the Internet of the Stanley Cup Playoffs.

== TOM Online, YY Inc., Giant Interactive ==
Schloss was an executive director of TOM Online Inc. from December 17, 2003, and the chief legal officer of TOM Online from September 1, 2005. He was previously chief financial officer and an executive director of TOM Online from December 17, 2003. Schloss is also a non-executive independent director and chairman of the Audit Committee of both YY Inc. and Giant Interactive Group. YY Inc. is a revolutionary rich communication social platform based in Guangzhou, China that engages users in real-time online group activities through voice, text and video. It is listed on the Nasdaq Global Market and trades under the ticker symbol YY. Giant Interactive is one of China's largest online game companies. Giant Interactive is listed on the New York Stock Exchange and trades under the ticker symbol GA. Schloss was general counsel of IBM China/Hong Kong from 1989 to 1991.

== Founding member of STAR TV ==
Schloss was a founding member of the senior management team and served as general counsel of Satellite Television Asian Region Limited, or STAR TV from 1991 to 1996. Star TV was established by Hong Kong media and internet tycoon Richard Li and was later sold to Rupert Murdoch. Schloss was a director of Star TV from 1993 to 1996 as well as director of Asia Satellite Telecommunications Company Limited ("Asia Sat") from November 1991 to June 1993. While at STAR TV Schloss was involved in the creation of MTV Asia, Channel V, STAR Sports and STAR World in addition to other satellite television channels in Asia. Schloss also played a prominent role in Star TV's efforts to assemble the largest Chinese-language film library in the world, leading the negotiations, contract drafting and due diligence for the acquisition of Raymond Chow's Golden Harvest film library, the Golden Princess film library, the Mandarin Films film library and Dickson Poon's D&B Films library. The Chinese-language film library assembled by Star TV includes films by Bruce Lee, Jackie Chan, Chow Yun-fat, Michelle Yeoh and director John Woo.

== Investment banking ==
Following Star TV, Schloss was managing director of ING Barings and head of its Asia Media, Internet and Technology Group from 1999 to 2001. In this role Schloss represented numerous international media and entertainment companies as well as American televangelist Pat Robertson in his China internet projects. Schloss has also served as a director of MediaVest Limited.

== Education and professional information ==
Schloss holds a B.A. in Political Science from Tulane University and a Juris Doctor Degree from the Tulane University Law School. He has served as a director of various companies listed on the NASDAQ, New York Stock Exchange, the Over-the-Counter Market ("OTC") and the Hong Kong Stock Exchange.

He was a founder of the Cable and Satellite Broadcasting Association of Asia (CASBAA) in 1992 and has written extensively on the development of China's Copyright Law, especially as it pertains to software.

From 2006 to 2011 Schloss was a member of the board of trustees of the International School of Beijing.

Since 2013, Schloss has been a member of the editorial board of the China Business Law Journal.

== The Randy Abel Stable ==
Schloss is a founding member of and plays banjo in the Beijing, China-based and critically acclaimed Americana and Alt-Country band, The Randy Abel Stable.
