= Bi Fujian =

Chinese television personality

- 毕福剑
- Born: 16 January 1959 (age 67); Jinzhou District, Dalian, Liaoning, China
- Other names: Laobi (老毕); Bi Laoye (毕姥爷)
- Education: Communication University of China
- Occupations: Director, host, professor, photographer, producer, reporter
- Years active: 1989-2015
- Agent: Hua'na Media International Group
- Television: Dream Theater; Happy Host; Avenue of Stars (past)
- Children: 1

Bi Fujian (simplified Chinese: 毕福剑; traditional Chinese: 畢福劍; pinyin: Bì Fújiàn; born 16 January 1959), also known by his nickname Laobi (老毕; 老畢; Lǎo Bì; 'Old Bi'), is a Chinese director, television host and professor. Bi is the long-time host of the singing competition franchise Xingguang Dadao (Avenue of Stars), and has been a host on the CCTV New Year's Gala variety entertainment program from 2012 to 2015.

== Biography ==
Bi was born in Jinzhou District of Dalian City, Liaoning Province on 16 January 1959, the sixth of seven children.

Bi attended Fenglin School (枫林小学), Wangjia School (王家小学), Dalian No. 12 Middle School (Chinese: 大连市第十二中学), and Dalian No. 2 Middle School (Chinese: 大连市第二中学).

During the Down to the Countryside Movement Bi became a sent-down youth, working in the mostly rural Pulandian area near Dalian from 1976 to 1978. After the Cultural Revolution, Bi joined the Navy and served for seven years, initially joining the Beihai Fleet. In 1984 he joined a military expedition to Antarctica.

Bi left the military and entered Communication University of China in 1985, majoring in directing. He graduated in 1989.

=== Career ===
After graduating, in June 1989, he began working for China Central Television as a junior director in its arts and entertainment department. In 1994 he took part in the filming of Romance of the Three Kingdoms as a camera specialist. In 1995 he visited the Arctic. In 1997, Bi became a host of Dream Theater (梦想剧场). Beginning in 2004, Bi hosted Xingguang Dadao, an "Idol"-style singing competition franchise also known as Avenue of Stars.

In October 2011, Bi became a part-time visiting professor at Shandong University. Since 2012, Bi has been a host on the annual CCTV New Year's Gala, known for his natural presentation style, sense of humour, and improvisation skills.

In January 2014, at the season finale of the Avenue of Stars competition, Bi came out dressed as a Buddhist religious figure and performed a song that was seen as mocking the Buddhist religion. Buddhist groups in the country protested and Bi apologised.

In April 2015, an online video surfaced of Bi Fujian attending a dinner party and making irreverent remarks that were seen as critical of Mao. He made sarcastic remarks such as "Uh, don't mention that old son of a bitch, he tormented us!", believed to be a reference to Mao, as he sang lines from Mao-era opera Taking Tiger Mountain by Strategy while entertaining his friends. Due to this incident, CCTV suspended all programs hosted by Bi, started from 8 April to 11 April 2015. Bi was suspended by CCTV on 10 April.

On 19 December 2015, Bi Fujian participated in a charity event at Jilin Normal University, in Siping, northeast China's Jilin province.

=== Personal life ===
Bi was married in 1991. His daughter, Bi Ling (毕凌), also known as Jiaojiao, was born in July 1996. The couple divorced in 2004, and his daughter immigrated to Canada with her mother. Bi enjoys calligraphy, drawing comics, and playing basketball.

== Works ==
=== Television ===
- Dream Theater (梦想剧场)
- Xingguang Dadao, also known as Avenue of Stars (星光大道)
- CCTV New Year's Gala (2012–2015)

=== Sketch comedy ===
- Don't got money (就差钱)
- Got the money now (不差钱)

=== Single ===
- Racecourse (跑马场)
- The Beautiful Girl is going to Marry (漂亮的姑娘就要嫁人)
- Laobi's Love (老毕的爱)
