= Chang Shilei =

Chinese singer

Chang Shilei (Chinese: 常石磊; born July 21, 1981, in Guangzhou, Guangdong) is a Chinese singer, music producer, and songwriter.

== Background ==
After graduating from Shanghai Conservatory of Music, Chang became a songwriter and music producer. Later, one of his demos moved the general director of 2008 Beijing Olympic Games, Zhang Yimou. Eventually, Zhang chose Chang's demo and made it the theme song of the Beijing Olympic Games opening ceremony. The song "You and Me", performed by singers Sarah Brightman and Liu Huan. He was also the songwriter and vocalist of another song that was chosen to be performed at the opening ceremony, Dreamy Olympic Rings.

After the 2008 Beijing Olympic Games, Chang released an album called Niu China, which selected many cover songs used to be popular in the 1980s. From then on, Chang went from backstage to the front and started his career as an original singer. In June 2010, Chang released his first original album, Myself. In September 2010, he recorded the song The Hawthorn Tree as the theme song for the movie Under the Hawthorn Tree, which is a film directed by Director Zhang Yimou.
