= Henry Huo =

Chinese singer-songwriter and actor (born 1990)

- 霍尊
- Born: 18 September 1990 (age 36); Shanghai, China
- Education: SHU-UTS SILC Business School
- Occupations: Singer-songwriter, musician
- Years active: 2012–2021
- Musical career
- Instrument: piano

Henry Huo (Chinese: 霍尊; pinyin: Huò Zūn; born 18 September 1990) is a Chinese singer-songwriter and actor.

He gained fame by placing in the top three in singing competition Asian Wave 《声动亚洲》 He became popular nationwide by winning the first season of Sing My Song (中国好歌曲 第一季), a competition for songwriters to sing their own compositions. His original 'Rolled-up Pearl Curtain' (Juán Zhū Lián) drew praise from both judges and audience alike. The song was awarded Song of the Year. 13 days after his win, Henry was asked to perform in the CCTV Chinese New Year Eve Gala, which was broadcast worldwide, thus cementing his position as China's newest composing prodigy. Meanwhile, Henry claimed the main prize in the Tianjin Satellite Channel Drama Contest Season 1 (《国色天香》第一季) by playing a dan (男旦) in the Peking Opera. He was awarded the title '2014 Drama King'.

== Biography ==
=== Early life ===
Henry was born and raised in Shanghai, China. He also lived in Guangzhou and Shenyang for a period of time. His father, Feng Huo, is from Shenyang and his mother, Xiaoping Zhong is from Shanghai. Both were famous singers from whom he inherited his musical talent. His first language is Mandarin, but he also speaks the Shanghai dialect and English fluently. He sings in Mandarin, English, and Japanese.

Henry's mother quit her job to raise him. She was his first music teacher and took care of Henry throughout childhood. Henry expressed the deep bond between him and his mother in his introduction on Sing My Song. Mrs Huo loved the songs of Michael Jackson and Teresa Teng so much that Henry grew to be influenced by their music. He was also influenced by Cape No. 7 of Kousuke Atari and finally developed his own singing style. Henry is known for his crystal clear healing voice and vocal technique, similar to that of Hong Kong singer Anita Mui.

=== Musical journey ===
Henry started to learn piano at the age of 10 years and soon showed his affinity for music. He won the Individual Vocal Group Silver Award at the Shanghai Student Art Contest in 2004. In 2005, he placed third in the Middle School Group at the Shanghai 10th Youth Piano Contest.

In 2010, Henry was recommended by his college to participate in the Shanghai University "Zhiyin Cup" Piano Contest, where he won the Gold Award.

In 2011, Henry performed La campanella on piano for the University's New Year concert. The show was a huge success and made Henry popular on campus for his musical talent. In the same year, Henry was approached by the owner of Universal Music Group during a singing performance. Although he was soon signed by Universal Music Group, Henry stayed in SHU-UTS SILC Business School until he earned his bachelor's degree in Business Management.

In the summer of 2012, Henry finished within the top three in the Asian Wave music talent show, where he was awarded the Glory Star. His fame continued to grow from this first exposure.

In March 2014, Henry was crowned winner of Sing My Song, for which he composed and sang "Rolled-up Pearl Curtain" (卷珠帘). The song was so touching that judge Liu Huan shed tears the first time he heard it during Henry's audition. Soon after this song was first heard, Henry was recommended to perform again in 2014 CCTV Chinese New Year Eve Gala, which was broadcast worldwide, further expanding his fame.

=== Theater and drama ===
In 2014, Henry participated in Season 1 of Tianjin Satellite Channel's Drama Contest and played a dan (男旦) role in the Peking Opera.

His performance included Qiānlǐ Zhī Wài (《千里之外》, Thousands of Miles Away), Yānhuā Yì Lěng (《烟花易冷》, When Fireworks Fade), Měilì De Shénhuà (《美丽的神话》, Beautiful Myth), Wǒ Shì Huò Zūn (《我是霍尊》, I am Huo Zun), Fènghuáng Yú Fēi (《凤凰于飞》, The Flying Phoenix), Yīnwèi àiqíng (《因为爱情》, Because of Love), Zài Nà Táohuā Shèngkāi Dì Dìfāng (《在那桃花盛开的地方》, At the place where the peach blossom blooms), Shíjiān Dōu Dào Nǎ'er Qùle (《时间都到哪儿去了》, Wherever did the time go), and "Time To Say Goodbye".

His beautiful portrayal of women, his grace, clear voice, self-confidence, and humility were highly praised by professionals including Song Xiaochuan (宋小川) and Xiao Xiangyu (小香玉). Henry won the contest and was hailed as The 2014 Drama King.

Later in the year, Peking Opera artist Méi Bǎojiǔ (梅葆玖) led the ballet of Méi Lán Fong (梅兰芳) to memorise the master in Beijing, China. On 9 December, Henry was invited to sing its theme song Huā yǎ chán (《花雅禅》, The Zen in Grace and Flowers) which greatly enhanced the atmosphere of the performance.

=== Film and television ===
While Henry is known for his singing, he has also acted in films. In 2013, he played the role of a singer in the film Ashes to Ashes, 《从哪里来 到哪里去》 (lit. From Whence One Comes, There One Will Return). This is a film about children with reading disabilities and the singer turns out to be an angel at the end. He composed and sang the theme song "Duì Niǎo" (《对鸟》, Singing Birds).

In 2021, he joined the cast of Call Me By Fire as a contestant. He subsequently withdrew from it in light of recent controversies, shortly after the show's premiere and his first performance on it. He would then be blurred and censored out in later episodes.

=== Full-house performance ===
On 25 October 2014, Henry Huo held his first full-house performance at the Nanjing Red Bull Unplugged Concert. He sang his famous first audition song and other traditional Chinese songs such as Huāxīn (《花心》, The Flower Heart), Tiānyá gēnǚ (《天涯歌女》, The Wandering Songstress), Mo Li Hua (《茉莉花》, Jasmine Flower), Tào mǎ gān (《套马杆》, The Horses Shot), and Teresa Teng's classic ballad "The Moon Represents My Heart".

=== Performance abroad ===
In 2015, Henry went to North America to sing at the Chinese New Year Gala. On the night of 12 February, he was invited to sing 《卷珠帘》 at the United Nations New York Headquarters where representatives from 47 countries watched the performance. On the night of 22 February, he sang three songs, including "Chuánqí" (《传奇》, The Legend) in the Orpheum Theater in Vancouver, which received wild applause from the audience.

== Songs ==
Henry's original songs include 《You Are Everything to Me》, Xǐng (《醒》, Wake up), Juǎn Zhū Lián (《卷珠帘》) Fàng kāi nà sānguó (《放开那三国》, Let Go of The Three Kingdoms), Duì Niǎo (《对鸟》, Singing Birds), 《A Poem of Tang 唐诗》, and Dōngfēng yǐn (《东风引》, Inspired by the Wind from the East).

He published his first EP on 8 July 2014. The EP includes the theme song Qiàhǎo (《恰好》, What Is Appropriate) for the theatre drama (《山楂树之恋》, The Love Under the Hawthorn Tree), Qī duǒ liánhuā (《七朵莲花》,"Seven Lotuses"), and Juǎn Zhū Lián (《卷珠帘》, Pearl-decorated curtain rolled up).

Henry is also the first singer of Yù fú chuándēng (《玉佛传灯》, The Jade Buddha is Passing the Light), Méiguī bǎolěi (《玫瑰堡垒》, The Rose Castle), and Huā yǎ chán (《花雅禅》), The Zen in Grace and Flowers).

The songs Huo sang in the Asian Wave included Lí Rén (《离人》, The One Who Left), Mo Li Hua (《茉莉花》 The Jasmine Flower), Only You (《我只在乎你》), Fly Apart (《各自远扬》), Wúyǔlúnbǐ dì měilì (《无与伦比的美丽》, Unparalleled Beauty), Scarborough Fair, Chuánqí (《传奇》, The Legend), Dàn Yuàn Rén Chángjiǔ (《但愿人长久》, I wish you could stay forever), Wǒ Yuànyì (《我愿意》, I Will), Wǒ De Chéng (《我的城》, My City), Xǐng (《醒》, Wake), and Jìdé (《记得》, Remember).

In the 2014 Taiwan TV gala titled Matsu Light in My Heart (《妈祖之光：在我心中》), Henry sang Wǒ Qídài (《我期待》, Never say goodbye).

== Ceremonies ==
On 9 April 2014, Henry sang the theme song So Young(《致青春》) from the film So Young at the Fifth Annual Awards of Directors Association ceremony.

== Controversy ==
In August 2021, Huo's ex-girlfriend Chen Lu, a dancer, came forward claiming that Henry had cheated on her throughout their 9-year relationship. She also alleged that Huo had multiple one-night stands with different women whilst they were together. She claimed that when she confronted Huo, he asked "How much do you want me to pay you?". She also professed that he told her to "delete all traces of him on my (Chen's) Weibo" when she wanted to publicize their relationship.

Later that week, Chen also exposed Huo's distaste for reality television, including Sisters Who Make Waves and its male counterpart. In their conversations leaked by Chen, Huo expressed that "The price they’re offering is not bad. But I’m still thinking about it because it feels like I’ll be making myself look very 'low' (…) I really dislike stuff like Sisters Who Make Waves. I’m a musician and artiste, but I’ll have to turn myself into a trainee again just to be part of some idol group made up of has-beens." Netizens concluded that this show that he referred to was "Call me by fire" which he participated in. They thus called for his leave from the show. Afterwards, it was announced that he was withdrawn shortly after the series pilot, and his appearance in two performances were pixelated.

On 14 August, Huo issued a notice of withdrawal from the entertainment industry as the controversy had affected many others' lives. He thanked Chen for their 7 years and 4 months together, apologized that he made a few rash comments, but refuted Chen's other claims politely. He hope that his departure would put an end to the damage inflicted to all.

In light of the controversy, online fan groups dedicated to Huo were shut down, and his Weibo account was disabled.

On 17 August, writer Chen Lan exposed that Chen Lu used records of Huo's private messages to blackmail him for a nine million "break-up" fee. Huo gave her five hundred and eighty thousand, then stopped as he feared Chen would be charged with extortion if her acts were exposed. After Chen Lan reviewed all evidence Huo had in possession, she exposed that Chen Lu's accusations about Huo were fabricated lies. The group chat messages were cut and pasted to blur the timeline and photoshopped to deceive readers. Chen Lu could not provide any evidence of the 3 million she claimed to have spent on Huo. Conversely, Huo's wechat records showed he regularly sent Chen Lu spending money in the ten thousands range. Chen Lu did not help build Huo's career and did not end her own career because of him. It was in fact Huo and his mother who helped Chen Lu to advance in her career. Chen Lu and her friend Wang Meng were captured by security camera while proceeding to blackmail Huo. Chen Lan exposed the evidence online and encourage Huo to sue Chen Lu for extortion.

On 22 December, Chen Lu was arrested by police for extortion. Civil suits for libel will follow after the criminal case for extortion.

== Major awards ==
- 2012 summerTop Three in Asian Wave (《声动亚洲》前三强) and awarded Glory Star(荣耀之星).
- 21 March 2014, Championship in Sing My Song (中国好歌曲) first season and Juǎn Zhū Lián (《卷珠帘》, Pearl-decorated curtain rolled up) awarded The Song of the Year.
- 19 April 2014, Championship in Tianjin Satellite TV Channel Drama Contest Guó Sè Tiānxiāng First Season (《国色天香》第一季) and awarded The Drama King of the Year(年度"戏曲之王").
- 9 August 2014, Qiàhǎo(《恰好》, What Is Appropriate) was voted as Champion in CCTV Music Channel The Best Worldly Chinese Music contest(中央电视台"全球华人音乐榜上榜")
- 10 December 2014, Juǎn Zhū Lián(《卷珠帘》, Pearl-decorated curtain rolled up) was awarded The Niándù Shénqū Niándù shénqū jiǎng("年度神曲奖", Annual Divine Music Award) at Shenzhen Satellite TV Channel Annual Festival of Youth Choice (深圳卫视)《青春的选择年度盛典》).
- 13 December 2014, Méiguī bǎolěi (《玫瑰堡垒》, The Rose Castle) was voted as second place at CCTV Music Channel The Best Chinese Music contest(中央电视台"《全球中文音乐榜上榜》").
- 23 December 2014, Juǎn Zhū Lián (《卷珠帘》, Pearl-decorated curtain rolled up) listed in CCTV Music Channel Top Ten Goldern Music(中央电视台音乐频道《十大中文金曲》).
- 27 December 2014, listed in CCTV Music Channel 2014 Top Ten Glorious Blooming Singers (中央电视台音乐频道 《光荣绽放2014十大新锐歌手》).
- 16 January 2015, awarded Tiānlài zhī mèi ("天籁之魅", Charm of Heaven) at Most Charming Chinese Awards Ceremony from Southern People Weekly (《南方人物周刊》中国魅力榜颁奖盛典).
- 30 March 2015, awarded The Best composer and Juǎn Zhū Lián (《卷珠帘》, Pearl-decorated curtain rolled up) listed in Annual Top Ten Golden Music from the 22nd Dōngfāng fēngyún bǎng (东方风云榜,'Oriental Billboard').
- 12 November 2017, awarded of Best Chinese Artist at the MTV European Music Awards 2017 in London. 2017 MTV, EMA大中华区最受欢迎艺人

== Album ==
Song Titles	Published Songs	Publishing Dates
Tian Yun(《天韵·霍尊》,Melodies from the heaven)	Juǎn Zhū Lián (《卷珠帘》, Pearl-decorated curtain rolled up) Bù sòng tiē (《不送帖》, Do not send posts) Dié (《蝶》, Butterfly), The poet written for the Tang (《唐诗》), Mùmián (《木棉》, Kapok) Qiàhǎo (《恰好》, What Is Appropriate) Méiguī bǎolěi (《玫瑰堡垒》, The Rose Castle) Huā yǎ chán (《花雅禅》), The Zen in Grace and Flowers) Qī duǒ liánhuā (《七朵莲花》, The Seven Lotus) piano version Juǎn Zhū Lián (《卷珠帘》, Pearl-decorated curtain rolled up)	2015-04-25
Wan Le(《玩乐》,Playful Music)	Xing(《醒》,Awaken) Chuan Yue(《穿越吧！猛犸》,Traverse! Mammoth) Shao Nv Yu Hai(《少女与海》,Young girl and the sea) Zhui Feng Zheng De Ren(《追风筝的人》,The one who's chasing the kite) Ling Ding(《伶仃》,Loneliness) Wei Zhai Hua(《未摘花》,The flower that has never been picked up) Jiu Se Lu(《九色鹿》,The dear with nine colors) Li Hua Song(《梨花颂》,Ode to Pyrus flowers) Taiqi Zen《太极·禅》Ze Po(《泽泊》,The lakes) and the accompaniment for Jiu Se Lu(《九色鹿》,The dear with nine colors)	2018-12-18
Gui Yi(《归一》,Normalization)	Zing Luo(《星落》,The star has fallen) Bu Si Niao(《不死鸟》,The bird who's never dead) 《IDUN》 Zi Ding Yi Shao Nv(《自定义少女》,Self-defined young girl) Wo Yi Wei(《我自以为》,I think...) Zhai Ge(《宅歌》,Songs from an otaku) Xi Yang Xia De Ben Pao(《夕阳下的奔跑》,Running in the sunset) You Yuan San Yue Chu Jiu(《游园三月初九》,Visiting a garden at 9 March) Gui Yi(《归一》,Normalization)《幼虫》	2020-11-02
