= Su Yunying =

Chinese singer-songwriter

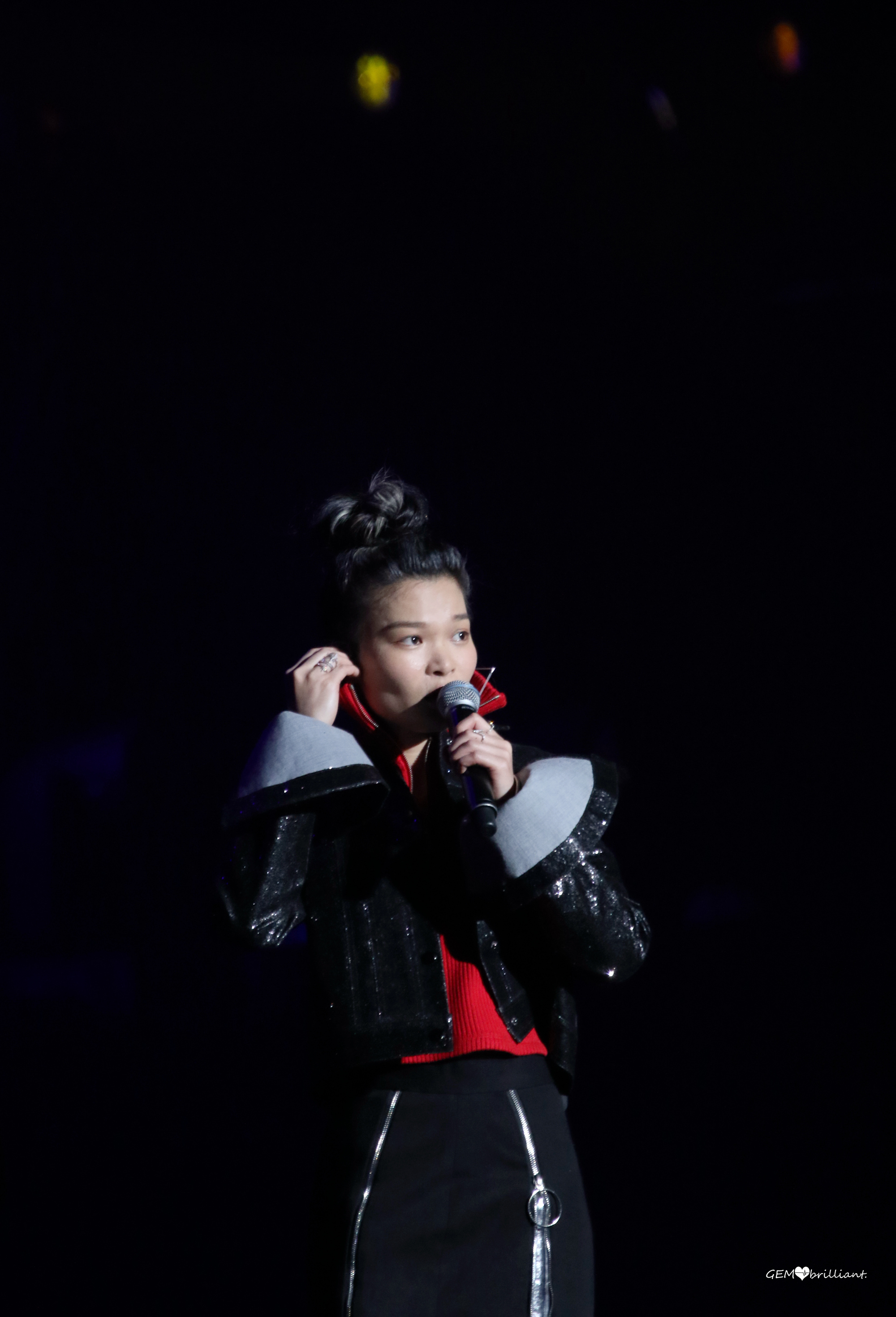
- Born: 8 April 1991 (age 35); Sanya, Hainan, China
- Occupation: Singer-songwriter
- Years active: 2015–present

Chinese name
- Traditional Chinese: 蘇運瑩
- Simplified Chinese: 苏运莹
Transcriptions
Standard Mandarin
- Hanyu Pinyin: Sū Yùnyíng
- Musical career
- Genres: Pop, folk
- Instrument: Vocals
- Label: Sony Music

Su Yunying (simplified Chinese: 苏运莹; traditional Chinese: 蘇運瑩; born 8 April 1991), also known as Sue Su, is a Chinese singer-songwriter of Li ethnicity.

Su was born and raised in Sanya, Hainan. Su rose to prominence in 2015 on Sing My Song, performing her own written debut song called "Yezi" (Chinese: 野子, which could be translated as "The Wild") and won second place.

Su also participated in the 2016 season of the Hunan Television show I Am a Singer Season 4.

== Early life and education ==
Su Yunying is a native of the Li nationality in Hainan province. She grew up at the seaside and yearned for freedom. As she was a child with Li folk songs, she gradually fell in love with singing. Su Yunying's mother also likes singing, which has a great influence on her. After finding that her daughter was interested in singing, she often taught her to sing.

Su Yunying graduated from Beijing Contemporary Music Academy in 2014. She was admitted to the Chinese Singing Department of the School, and began to learn folk songs. After her sophomore year, she transferred to the pop singing department. Yi Jiangfeng, the head of the department, became her teacher, which benefited her a lot in music.

During the winter vacation of her senior year, Su Yunying returned home in Sanya and wrote her first song "Heart" for the people she secretly missed. "I really like the heart that I like him, but we don't have to be together," Su said. "Just like I like the feeling of following him and stepping on his shadow after school. Just very coincidentally, that feeling is because of him."

Su Yunying did not know how to arrange music and was not good at Musical Instruments. She happened to meet two boys who knew music, so she formed the first band, renting a house together and playing with each other. Although the band broke up within a few months due to practical problems and the three also went apart, Su Yunying benefited very much from it and opened the door to the new century.

== Career ==
On 2 January 2015, Su Yunying signed up for the second season of "Sing My Song". She sang the original song "Yezi" in the first phase of the blind audition. She joined the Cai Jianya team to receive her guidance, and later won the first main seat in the Cai Jianya team with the original song "Fireflies".

On 13 June 2015, Su signed with Sony Music Entertainment, and joined the "Made" music project jointly created by Sony Music, Dream Sound Music and Taihe Music. LeTV Music provides exclusive video push for "Made" project, covering the widest area, the largest scale, and the largest number of participants in the series of LIVE performances. "Made" project creates more opportunities and influence for the development of original forces in the Chinese music scene.

On 14 August 2015, Su released her original single "Firefly", which was included in the compilation album "Xin Yuzhou". On 21 August, she released her original single "Yezi", which was included in the compilation of "Top Ten Golden Songs of the 2nd Sing My Song". On 26 December, she released her original single "2-0+1". On 29 December, she released her first solo creative album "Ming Ming", which includes 10 songs including "Scent of the Fantasy" and "Imagery Inside Our Hearts".

In June 2016, Su released her original single "Xin Xin" as the theme song of the animated movie "Toys War". On 19 June, she held her first concert "Yezi - The power to grow wildly" at the Beizhan Theater. On 6 July, she released the promotional song "Then" for the movie "Never Gone".

On 11 January 2017, Su released her solo single "Dongfang Bubai". On 7 April, she sang the Chinese promotion song "Lan Haizi" for the animated movie "Smurfs: The Lost Village". On 15 May, she released her solo cover single "Lu Guo Wo Er Duo De You Shang", which was included in Qin Zhen's memorial album "Qing Zhen".

On 13 December 2018, Su released her second solo music album "Fairyland", featuring 12 songs including "IS" and "You Too?".

On 19 July 2020, Su released the promotional song "Tianya Weijia", which was performed with Chen Chusheng for the 6th Asian Beach Games.

On 20 January 2021, Su released her solo single "Nan Yan". On 12 July, she sang the ending song "Wo Men" for the web series "Bei Zhe Nan Yuan". In August, she released the album of the same name "Su Yunying".

In 2022, Su sang the episode song "Darling Darling" of the TV series "The Oath of Love".

== Philanthropy ==
In 2016, Su Yunying was invited to participate in Chengdu IFS activity "Originality Never Changes, Let Love Shine" and sang "Yezi" and "Fireflies". Su also participated in a rose charity sale with the executive editor of magazine "OK! Wonderful". Both event were part of Operation Smile's 25th anniversary series in China. The rose sale benefited children with cleft lip and cleft palate and other head and facial deformities from poor families. All proceeds from the sale are used for their follow-up medical care.

In 2018, Su Yunying attended the "123 Easyfunding Charity Gala" and won the annual Model Charity Power Award.

== Awards and nominations ==
Year	Category	Song	Result
2019	MusicRadio Sound of Music 2018 China Top Charts Record of the Year Award	"Fantasy"(幻)	Won
2019	Most Popular Singer-Songwriter Award in the 31st Glory Festival of Music Pioneer List		Won
2019	Top 5 Best Pioneer Female Singers in the 31st Glory Festival of Music Pioneer List		Won
2019	Original Song Award in the 31st Glory Festival of Music Pioneer List	"Since Here Please Feel Free"(在这里请你随意)	Won
2016	Best New Singer Award at the 27th Taiwan Golden Melody Awards		Nominated
2016	Best Female Mandarin Singer Award at the 27th Taiwan Golden Melody Awards		Nominated
2016	Best New Singer of the Year Award at the 16th Annual Music Awards		Won
2016	Best New Singer of the Year Award at the 2nd Cool Music Asia Awards		Won
2015	Most watched song of the Year Award at the 16th Chinese Music Media Awards	"Yezi"(野子)	Won
2015	2016 Asia Golden Melody Awards Mainland Best New Singer		Won
2015	Golden Spike Award		Won
2015	Second place of the national finals of the 2nd China's best songs		Won

== Discography ==
=== Studio albums ===
#	Album name	Released date	Label	Tracks
1st	Ming Ming	2015/12/29	Sony Music	CD: 1. 冥明 Ming Ming; 2. 香香的幻想 Scent of the Fantasy; 3. 精靈 Fairy; 4. 光良裡只是意會 Imagery Inside Our Hearts; 5. 倒掛金鉤 Self Determination and cognition 6. 徒步 Walking; 7. 2-0+1; 8. 空人得堅強 Stay Strong Yet You're Alone; 9. 複 Sensitivity; 10. 寶貴 Precious
2nd	Fairyland	2018/12	Sony Music	CD: 1. 它是一個序 早安版本 INTRO; 2. IS; 3. 你也是嗎 You Too?; 4. 你擁有的是現在 What You Have Is Now; 5. 在這裡請你隨意 Since Here Please Feel Free; 6. 女人珍珠般的心 Pearl Heart; 7. 憂傷少年和陽光女孩 Boy & Girl; 8. 想你和我們以後 After Thinking About You and Us; 9. 濃情濃意 Strong Affection; 10. 生活倒影 Shadow of Life; 11. 時候 Moment; 12. 它是一個序 晚安版本 OUTRO
3rd	Sue	2021/08/06	Sony Music	CD: 1. 前景 Prospect; 2. 夜色讓人思考 Night Makes Peoplel THink; 3. 再會 See You Again; 4. 貓貓 Cat; 5. 大狗小狗愛情狗 Dog; 6. 女孩力量 Girl Power; 7. 快快樂樂 Happy; 8. 逐 One By One; 9. 東邊春雨落 Spring Rain Falls In The East; 10. 真善美 Truth, The Goodness, and Beauty; 11. 你呢你來自哪裡 Where Are You From?; 12. 像你 As You

=== Singles ===
Single	Released date	Note
東方不敗 Dongfang Bubai *Label: Bravo Music	19 April 2016	Soundtrack
心心	24 June 2016	
後來 Then	6 July 2016	So Young 2: Never Gone Soundtrack
Love in 造物	4 August 2016	
藍孩子	7 April 2017	Smurfs: The Lost Village China Promo Song
路过我耳朵的忧伤	15 May 2017	
笑容	22 June 2018	Web series "快把我哥带走" Theme Song
尾巴	25 June 2018	Movie "Animal World" Promo Song
晚安	27 September 2018	
天涯为家	19 July 2020	The 6th Asian Beach Games Promo Song
南燕	20 January 2021	
我们	21 July 2021	Web series "北辙南辕" Ending Song

== Evaluation ==
Born in Sanya, Hainan, the singer, who is called ‘pixie’ by fans, has lived with nature at large since young and describes her hometown as very ‘passionate’. This point is reflected in her compositions, as in her song "Wild Child". The song became a hit, and portrays the message that without the restrictions and trappings of society, one can sing even more freely.

"Start from the music and tell everyone what I'm doing."

Su Yunying writes songs in a very special way. The words and melody come out together, 100 percent concentrated, and she can not hear others talking. "I like to swim through these ideas, wow, I can still be so."

"Some words and fixed words don't nail my mind, so I put the pictures and words I want together."

"This is the kind of girl she is, crazy and weird. While speaking, her expression changes constantly, and her ideas jump, at one point offering her viewpoint on star signs, at other times earnestly pouring her heart out about a musician she loves."

"Because every type of music is just a way of expressing a lifestyle. The genres I like are varied, it’s not just about Rap, Jazz or Reggae, even musical theatre music I really like. At the moment I want to try everything."

Music critic Erdi once commented like this: "What a living life is hidden in this voice! Strange, tricky, as if a fleeing spirit, floating across the sea into Su Yunying's body, the elf, called the wild son."

People with insufficient imagination can not understand Su Yunying's song: melody ups and downs, gorgeous words, bright and beautiful voice. At the end of each time, the voice trembled, like a wild horse, and suddenly broke free from the rein."It may have something to do with emotions, and I tell you in my voice that my emotions are arrived."
