= The Randy Abel Stable =

The Randy Abel Stable (马厩乐队)
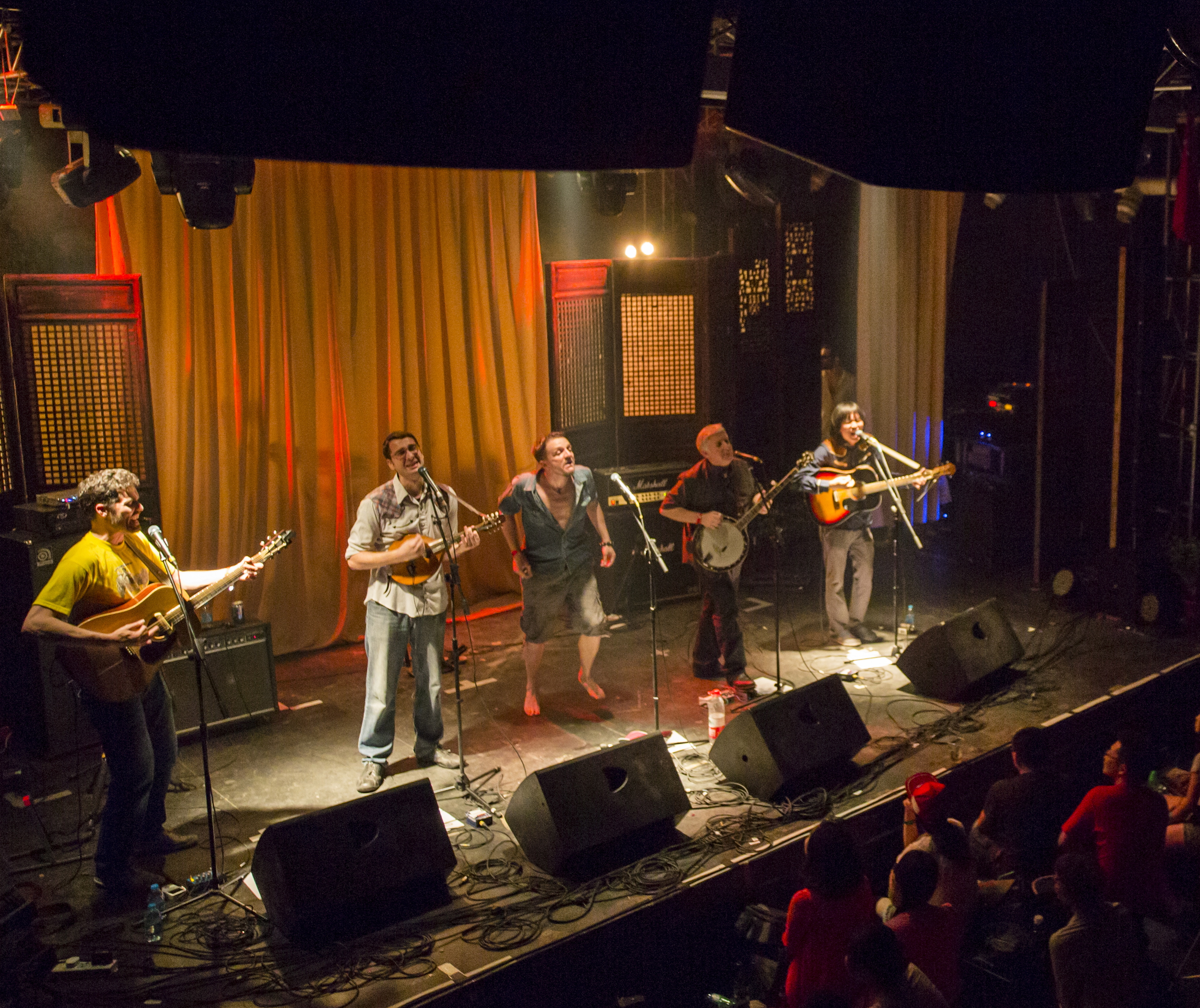
- The Randy Abel Stable at Hanggai Music Festival Mako Live House, Beijing, China 2013

Background information
- Origin: Beijing, China
- Genres: Americana, Alt-Country
- Years active: 2011-present
- Members: Randy Abel - Lead Vocals, Harmonica; Joshua Dyer - Guitar and dobro Peter Schloss - Banjo; Liu YuSi - Guitar; Johnny "Iceman" Bing - Bass; Parker Trevathan - Mandolin
- Website: Official Website

The Randy Abel Stable (Chinese: 马厩乐队; pinyin: Mǎjiù Yuèduì) is an Americana or Alt-Country band from Beijing, China. Critically acclaimed for their live shows, "The Stable" combines honky tonk, country, bluegrass and blues to produce a unique sound that has been described as having "the realism and sadness of Townes Van Zandt, the imagery and lyricism of Hank Williams Sr. and the excitement and raw energy of the Ramones." Playing a variety of musical instruments which are native to the United States of America and are seldom seen in China—e.g. banjo, mandolin, dobro and harmonica, The Stable draws inspiration from a wide range of genres. The band's typical live performance takes its predominantly Chinese audience through a musical journey of honky tonk, country, bluegrass and blues with a high energy live show composed of original country ballads, crisp honky tonk dance tunes, Mississippi Delta blues and traditional Rock N' Roll.

== Awards and achievements ==
In 2012, Beijing's City Weekend Magazine gave The Randy Abel Stable "Honorable Mention" as "Best Local Band of the Year." In April 2013, City Weekend Magazine again nominated The Randy Abel Stable as "Best Local Band of the Year" in its Reader's Choice Awards. In March 2013, influential Beijing music writer BeijingDaze included The Randy Abel Stable's performance at 2 Kolegas' DazeFeast as one of the "Most Memorable Performances of 2012."

== Cooperation with Touring International Artists ==
In February 2012, The Randy Abel Stable played at Beijing's Yugong Yishan with Jefferson Airplane and Hot Tuna founder and Rock and Roll Hall of Fame member, Jorma Kaukonen. The band has also played with numerous other international artists when they have toured China. These artists include The Hold Steady's Franz Nicolay, Australian bluesman Jeff Lang, Japan's Shun Kikuta and Sweden's Little Marbles.

== Cooperation with Chinese Musicians ==
In addition to notable international acts, The Randy Abel Stable has also played together with leading Chinese bands. The Randy Abel Stable's April 2012 show at Yugong Yishan with the Inner Mongolian band Ajinai (阿基耐) ended with a joint-set that is widely considered historic in its significance as it believed to be the first time Americana music had been played together with the Humai vocal effects and high grassland chants that are a signature of Mongolian folk music. Following this show, it has been rumored in the Chinese music press that the two bands are planning to record an album together.

== Music Festivals ==
The Randy Abel Stable has played at various music festivals throughout China including Midi Festival Beijing 2013 and 2014, Hanggai World Music Festival 2013, Wood+Wires Music Festival in Shanghai 2013, Wuxi Taihu Lake Festival 2014, Midi Suzhou Folk & World Music Festival, The 2014 Shanghai World Music Festival, Zhujiajiao Water Village Music Festival 2012 and the Ditan Folk Festival 2012.

== Discography ==
- Stable Condition (2013)
