= Sydney Institute of Language and Commerce =

International education program

SHU-UTS SILC Business School
- Established: May, 1994
- President: Prof. Gong Siyi
- Academic staff: 160
- Location: Shanghai, People's Republic of China
- Website: shusilc.shu.edu.cn/index.htm

SILC was co-founded by Shanghai University (SHU) and University of Technology Sydney (UTS) in 1994, as one of the first universities with an international program. At the time, it only offered English language courses and diploma programs.

SILC is located in the Jiading District, a cultural and technological centre in Shanghai. Besides Jiading campus, Shanghai University has another two campuses, which are located in Baoshan and Yanchang. The SILC has 3 teaching buildings: Wembo, Wenshang and Wenda, a large sporting complex (Xingjian) a students learning building (Wende), and an administration building (Wenhui).

SILC employs over 160 faculty and staff. About 3,500 students are currently studying at SILC.

== Undergraduate Program ==
Bachelor of Management (major in Business Administration)

Bachelor of Management (major in Information Management & Information System)

Bachelor of Economics (major in International Economics & Trade)

== Master Program ==
Master of Finance (MFin)

Master of Engineering Management (MEM)
