= Hanggai (band) =

Chinese folk music group

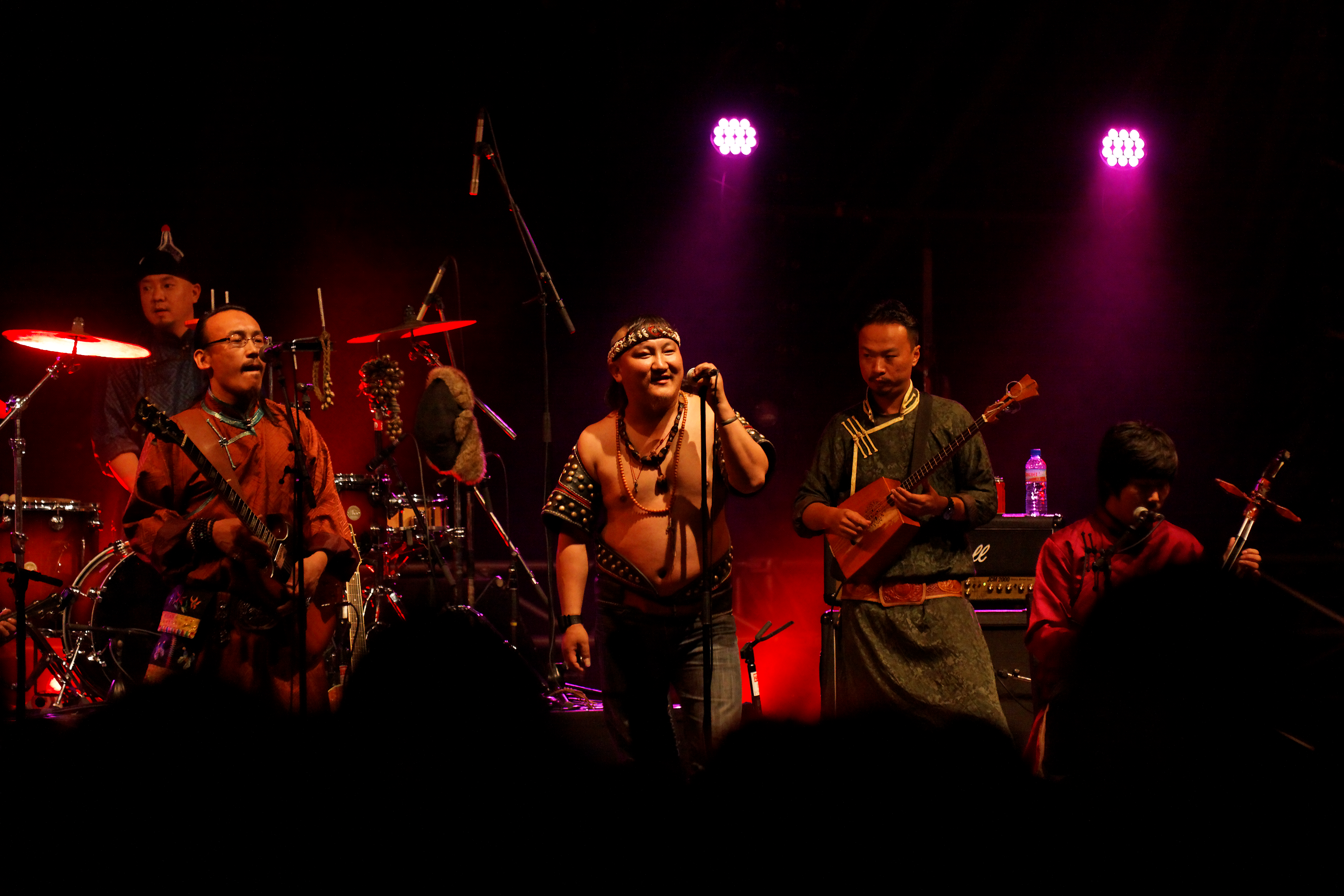
- Hanggai in 2011

Background information
- Origin: Beijing, China
- Genres: Folk rock, indie rock, hard rock, jazz rock
- Years active: 2004–present
- Label: Tian Hao Entertainment
- Members: Yiliqi (Ilchi) – vocals, tobshuur; Batubagen (Bagen) – vocals (throat singing), morin khuur; Hurizha (Hurcha) – lead vocals; Yilalata (Ileta/Sheng Li) – lead vocals, guitar; Ailun (Allen) – guitar; Niu Xin – bass; Meng Da – percussion
- Past members: Hugejiltu; Wu Junde; Li Zhongtao; Xu Jingchen
- Website: http://site.douban.com/hanggai/ (Chinese)

Hanggai (Chinese: 杭盖乐队; pinyin: Hánggài Yuèduì) is an Inner Mongolian folk rock group based in Beijing who specialize in a blend of Mongolian folk music and more modern styles such as punk rock. Their songs incorporate traditional folk lyrics as well as original compositions, and are sung in Mongolian and Mandarin.

== Background ==
NPR Radio states that in a country where genres such as C-pop dominate mainstream airwaves, Hanggai is making new inroads into the Chinese music industry with their modern take on Mongolian folk music. Some of the members are ethnic Mongolians while the remaining are ethnic Han who specialize in Mongolian instruments. All of the members hail from Inner Mongolia or Beijing.

The term "Hanggai" itself is a Mongolian word referring to an idealized natural landscape of sprawling grasslands, mountains, rivers, trees, and blue skies. The band was created when Ilchi, captivated by the sound of throat singing and wanting to rediscover his ethnic heritage, travelled to Inner Mongolia to learn the art. It was there that he met fellow band members Hugejiltu and Bagen. In an interview with NPR, Ilchi stated, "most of our people have moved away from the old way of life [...] After moving to the cities, many of us have gradually been subjected to a very strong cultural invasion by an oppressive culture. So this traditional music has completely lost its space."

== Musical influences and style ==
The members of Hanggai come from diverse backgrounds, with Ilchi having once been the front man of punk band T9. These eclectic experiences have come together to give Hanggai a unique sound, blending Mongolian folk music with more popular forms such as punk. In an interview with Spinner, Ilchi stated that among the group's many influences, Western artists such as "Pink Floyd, Radiohead, Rage Against the Machine, Secret Machines, Electralane and Neil Diamond" have played a large role in shaping the band's music. Although the core of their sound is based around the morin khuur and the topshur, two traditional instruments, the band also incorporates more modern sounds.

In each of their albums, the band has also made heavy use of electric guitars, computer programming, bass, and banjoes in order to create a more seamless and modern sound.

Many of the songs are adaptations of Mongolian folk songs and are sung in Mongolian incorporating throat singing, a Mongolian technique in which the artist emits two different pitches at the same time.

== Cultural politics ==
Part of Hanggai's goals as a musical group is to help strengthen Mongolian culture in China in fictions involved in "rediscovering cultural identity in modern China: He's an ethnic Mongolian who had to relearn the language to sing in it, and he's singing about a fast-disappearing way of life he's never really lived himself." Although many of their songs, such as Wuji, hark back to a simpler pastoral past with lyrics, such as "The beloved grasslands where I was born [...] I will sing my praise to you for ever [..] My beloved Mongolian homeland [...] I will sing to you playing my banjo [...]", a large portion of the album itself is interjected with the sounds of Beijing street traffic speaking further to the complications of finding one's ethnic identity in the face of a more dominant mainstream culture.

In an article on Spinner, when asked about the complications of having Hanggai's music being categorized as "Chinese", Ilchi responded, "Hanggai's music is very traditional Mongolian music. Some of our songs are influenced by Chinese music, because those songs were composed after the founding of the People's Republic of China in 1949, and we were all born long after that! We are influenced by what we grew up listening to, and we're still searching for our musical roots".

Producer Robin Haller added that there has "always been a very close and complicated relationship between China's ethnic majority Han people [...] and the people who live in China's border areas—Tibetans, Muslim Uyghurs [...] and, of course, Mongols. Several Chinese dynasties were founded by invading nomads from the north [...] So Mongol songs and grassland culture in general is certainly considered "Chinese" by Chinese listeners—but 'Chinese' in the broadest sense of the term. Maybe a better analogy [...] would be how Celtic songs are listened to in the U.K.; most English listeners would consider them British, but they're exotic, beautiful and slightly dangerous in a way English folk music isn't!" Hanggai is one of five bands in the documentary Beijing Bubbles—Punk and Rock in China's Capital, which was directed by George Lindt and Susanne Messmer.

By playing Mongolian folk songs while also incorporating modes of popular music, Hanggai is creating a medium through which it is effectively able to express the voice of a generation yearning to reconnect with its ethnic roots in the face of a dominating mainstream culture. Ilchi states that. while although "the roots of Hanggai's music come from traditional Mongolian [...] Hanggai's music doesn't really speak of Genghis Khan's time, but it does reflect the life and ethics of the Mongolian people."

== Discography ==
- Hanggai (Beijing Dongfang Yingyin, 1 April 2007)
- Introducing Hanggai (World Music Network, 28 July 2008)
- He Who Travels Far (World Connection, 18 October 2010)
- Four Seasons (Starsing Records, 1 May 2012)
- Baifang (Harlem Recordings, 7 February 2014)
- Horse of Colors (Tian Hao Entertainment, 9 May 2016)
- Homeland (Tian Hao Entertainment, 5 December 2017)
- Big Brass Band (2019)

== Tours ==
Hanggai have performed twice at the Edmonton Folk Music Festival, in both 2009 and 2015. They were very well received, and other bands from Central Asia, such as Tuvan Huun Huur Tu, have been invited since.

Although it is known first and foremost as a predominantly heavy-metal oriented music festival, the band performed at the 2010 Wacken Open Air.

The band performed at the Sydney Festival in January 2011.

Hanggai performed at the Bonnaroo Music & Art Festival in Manchester, Tennessee June 9–12, 2011.

Hanggai performed at the Woodford Folk Festival in December 2011, drawing huge dancing crowds to each performance.

The band has hosted the Hanggai Music Festival yearly since 2010, inviting acts such as Huun-Huur-Tu and The Randy Abel Stable.

The band has maintained a steady popularity in the Netherlands, appearing at many summer festivals and concert venues since.

The band performed at the Sziget Festival, Budapest in 2017.

The band performed at the 2018 Battle of the Nations (Medieval Tournament) at Santa Severa outside Rome as post fight entertainment.

== Trivia ==
The song 酒歌 (Jiu Ge / Drinking Song) was recorded in bits and pieces at an actual party that the band attended. The song was eventually created by splicing together bits and pieces of audio from that night. The song has also been recorded with Dutch band Jovink for use as the theme song for their 2009 Zwarte Cross (nl) festival.

Ilchi first learned throat singing after Odsuren Baatar, a master throat singer from Mongolia, was invited by the Inner Mongolia Song and Dance Ensemble to conduct workshops on the art in Inner Mongolia. Before the formation of the band, Ilchi was featured in the Chinese punk documentary Beijing Bubbles.

In 2015 the band took first place in Season 2 of the Chinese television show Sing My Song.

== Further information ==
- Hanggai Biography at Rock in China
- Hanggai: Xiger xiger
- Hanggai: Drinking song
