= Xingguang Dadao =

Xīngguāng Dàdào (星光大道 "Star Boulevard", "Avenue of Stars") is a Chinese state broadcaster China Central Television (CCTV) talent show that started in 2004. Named after the Chinese name for the Hollywood Walk of Fame, it is CCTV's more “healthy” rival to Hunan Satellite Television's blockbuster Super Girl (TV series) (超级女声) talent show. The format is similar to other singing competition shows around the world like American Idol, Pop Idol, and The Voice. There is a similar show with a similar name produced in Taiwan called ChaoJi Xingguang Dadao.

The hosts are Zhu Xun and Nëghmet Rakhman.

== Regular Celebrity Guest ==
=== Foreign Celebrity Guests ===
Although the competitors typically come from various regions and backgrounds within China, there have been a few foreign competitors who have competed on the show. Some have continued on to appear in numerous other shows including singing competition shows, game shows, etc. A few have used the platform to launch their own TV shows. Some of these contestants include Daniela Anahi Bessia, Meilanie Neilan, Marie Smurthwaite, David Jameson Harris, Paul Just, and Chloe Hurst.

Additionally, some shows focus specifically on foreign guests (e.g. Informal talks, Beijing Guest) and some of those guests make a life long career out of it (e.g. DaShan a.k.a. Mark Rowswell).
