= You and Me (Olympic theme song) =

Song by Liu Huan Sarah Brightman Zhang Yimou
- Language: Chinese and English

"You and Me" (Chinese: 我和你; pinyin: Wǒ Hé Nǐ) is the official theme song of the 2008 Summer Olympics held in Beijing, People's Republic of China, which was performed in the opening ceremony of the Olympics by Liu Huan and Sarah Brightman. Zhang Yimou, director of the opening ceremony, chose the British singer which represents the capital London as the next Olympic host city in 2012 and over a local one in keeping to the game's theme of "One World, One Dream", signifying unity across language, race or religious barriers.

The official version of this song lasts four minutes, ten seconds and was composed by Chen Qigang, a Shanghai born French-Chinese composer. The music video of this song features people from around the world, their names in English and Chinese and lyrics appearing as sung.

The song was sampled at the 2022 Winter Olympics closing ceremony to help symbolize Beijing as both a Summer and Winter Olympic host city.
