= Allied Pacific Sports Network =

Allied Pacific Sports Network ("APSN") was one of the earliest over-the-top content OTT companies in Asia. Founded in 2009, APSN was the first provider of multiple live streamed sports in China, Hong Kong, Indonesia, Japan, Macau, Malaysia, the Philippines, Singapore, South Korea, Thailand and Vietnam. APSN ceased operations in 2012. In 2011, APSN streamed more than 5,000 hour of live sports. These sports included Major League Baseball, the Premier League, Bundesliga, Italian Serie A, and the National Hockey League. APSN was based in Beijing, China and Hong Kong and operated Major League Baseball websites throughout Asia under and exclusive license from Major League Baseball Advanced Media LLC and the Premier League, Bundesliga and National Hockey League websites throughout various countries in Asia as well as APSN.TV.

== MLB.CN and MLBKorea.com ==
During 2010 and 2011, APSN operated the MLB websites and mobile content business in Korea, China, Hong Kong, Macau, Singapore, the Philippines, Thailand, Indonesia and Vietnam These websites and mobile platforms provided Major League Baseball content including news, feature articles, video highlights, scores, standings, statistics, photos and an online store selling official MLB merchandise to Major League Baseball fans in their local languages. APSN streamed live on a daily basis more than 2,400 Major League Baseball games during the baseball season from Opening Day in April to the World Series in October.

== APSN Soccer ==
APSN internet streaming included live and on-demand matches of England's Premier League in China and Macau and Germany's Bundesliga in Japan, Korea, the Philippines, Vietnam, India, Pakistan, Bangladesh, Sri Lanka, Nepal, Bhutan, and the Maldives.

== Ice Hockey ==
APSN also previously operated NHL websites in Japan, Korea, China, Hong Kong, Macau and Taiwan providing local language NHL news, results, schedules, photos, standings and video highlights to hockey fans in North Asia.
