= Li Sisi =

Chinese television presenter

- 李思思
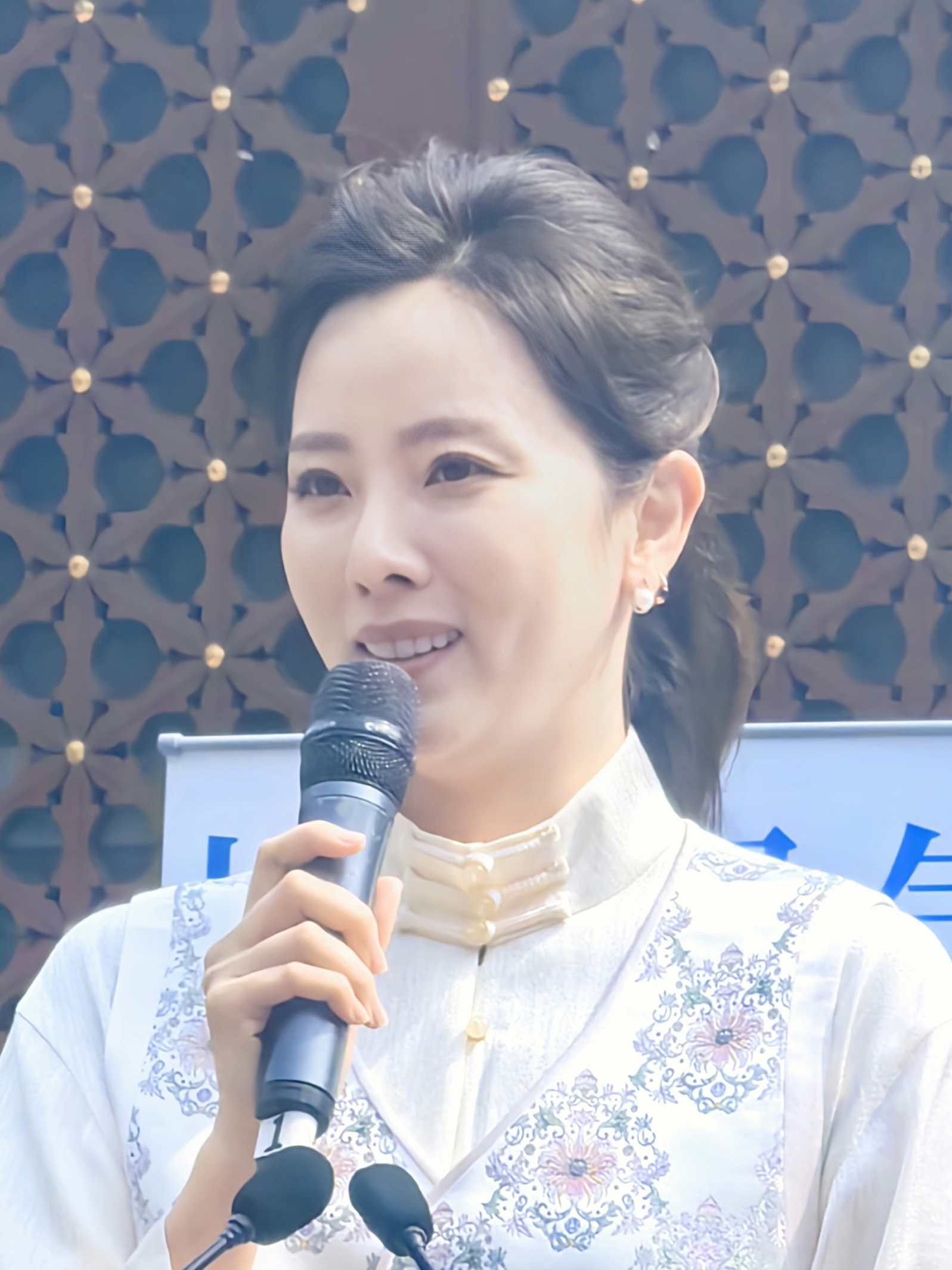
- Li Sisi (2026)
- Born: November 4, 1986 (age 39); Changchun, Jilin, China
- Education: Peking University
- Occupation: Host
- Years active: 2005-present
- Television: China Central Television (CCTV)

Li Sisi (Chinese: 李思思; pinyin: Lǐ Sīsī; born 4 November 1986) is a Chinese television host and media personality. She rose to fame in 2006 when she earned a third-place finish on the reality TV show Host Challenge. Li is most notable for hosting the CCTV New Year's Gala, one of China's most watched entertainment shows, since 2012.

== Biography ==
Li was born in Chaoyang District of Changchun, Jilin in 1986.

She studied dance at the age of 5. By age 10, she starred in Dong Wenhua's MV Ballad of the Great Wall (《长城谣》).

In 1998, Li enrolled in the Changchun Foreign Studies School and graduated in 2001. Li secondary studied at the Northeast Normal University Affiliated High School. She entered Peking University in 2004, majoring in Film Choreography at the College of Journalism and Communications, where she graduated in 2008.

In 2006, Li placed third in the reality TV show Host Challenge.

From 2007 to present, Li hosted programs in China Central Television. In 2012 she was selected as a host for the CCTV New Year's Gala, becoming the youngest host ever selected at age 26. She hosted the show again in 2013 and 2014.
