= Neghmet Rakhman =

Chinese Uyghur television host (born 1983)

Neghmet Abdulrakhman
- نېغمەت ئابدۇلراخمان
- Born: April 17, 1983 (age 43); Ürümqi, Xinjiang, China
- Other name: Little Ni (小尼)
- Education: Communication University of China
- Occupation: Host
- Years active: 2006-present
- Known for: SuperStar DingDong; Sing My Song
- Television: China Central Television (CCTV)
- Spouse: Pashagul Dulqun (m. 2013)

Neghmet Abdulrakhman (Uyghur: نېغمەت ئابدۇلراخمان, romanized: Nëghmet Abdulraxman; Chinese: 尼格买提·阿不都热合曼; pinyin: Nígémǎití·Rèhémàn; born 17 April 1983) (Note: In Chinese, his patronym is commonly abbreviated as '热合曼' (Uyghur: راخمان, romanized: Rakhman)) is a Chinese television host of Uyghur ethnicity, currently working for state broadcaster CCTV. He is noted for hosting SuperStar DingDong and Sing My Song. He has also been a host on the CCTV New Year's Gala since 2015.

== Life ==
Neghmet was born and raised in Ürümqi, Xinjiang, the son of Rizwan Ebey (Uyghur: رىزۋان ئەبەي; Chinese: 热孜万·艾拜), an actress at Xinjiang Song and Dance Troupe and Abdulrakhman Mahmut (Uyghur: ئبدۇلراخمان مامۇت; Chinese: 阿不都热合曼·马木提), an editor at Xinjiang People's Publishing House. In 2006, he graduated from the Communication University of China, majoring in broadcasting.

In 2006, Neghmet hosted Quiz Show (Chinese: 开心辞典) with Wang Xiaoya in CCTV-2. Then he hosted Everyone! Ready? Let's go! (Chinese: 全家总动员) with Fang Qiong.

In January 2012, he became host of the show The Echo is Loud (Chinese: 回声嘹亮) with Li Sisi.

Neghmet hosted SuperStar DingDong (Chinese: 开门大吉) since January 1, 2013. He also hosts Sing My Song, a Chinese reality talent show. In 2015, he became one of the hosts of the CCTV New Year's Gala. He returned to host the event again in 2016.

== Personal life ==
On September 28, 2013, Negmat Rahman married Pashagul Durqun (Uyghur: پاشاگۈل دۇلقۇن, romanized: Pashagül Dulqun; Chinese: 帕夏古丽·都鲁坤) in Ürümqi.
