= Liu Huan =

Chinese singer and songwriter (1963–2026)

- 刘欢
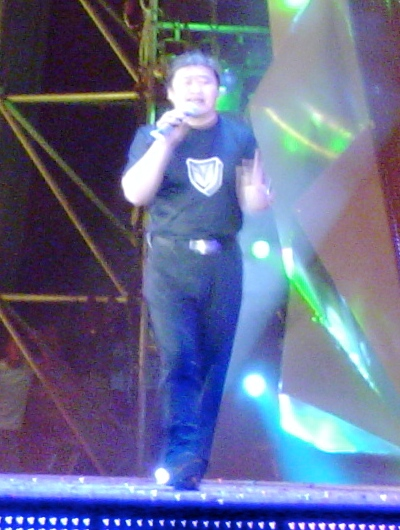
- Born: August 26, 1963; Tianjin, China
- Died: September 25, 2026 (aged 63); Shanghai, China
- Occupations: Singer, songwriter
- Years active: 1987–2026

Chinese name
- Traditional Chinese: 劉歡
- Simplified Chinese: 刘欢
Transcriptions
Standard Mandarin
- Hanyu Pinyin: Liú Huān
- Musical career
- Genre: C-pop
- Instruments: Vocals, piano
- Labels: China Media Ventures; Mengxiang Qiangyin; Universal Music

Liu Huan (August 26, 1963 – September 25, 2026) was a Chinese singer and songwriter. He was one of China's modern era pioneers in pop music. Liu combined his music career with teaching the history of Western music at the Beijing University of International Business and Economics in Beijing.

== Early life and education ==
On August 26, 1963, Liu Huan was born into a family of teachers in Tianjin. Liu graduated from Yaohua High School in Tianjin in 1981. Four years later, he graduated from the University of International Relations in Beijing, majoring in French literature. During his university days, he participated in a French songwriting competition and won first prize, as well as sponsorship from the French government to go on a tour to Paris. Following that, Liu was sent to the Ningxia Hui Autonomous Region in China for one year to help promote local education by teaching music there, and the time he spent there had an influence on his music.

Liu never received any systematic training in music, but was self-taught. His classmates recall Liu sitting on the stairs of his dorm, playing his guitar and singing songs until midnight. During his time in France, unlike his classmates who spent their time shopping and sightseeing, he went to bars in search of inspiration.

== Singing career ==
Liu performed the theme songs for a number of television series. In 1987, he performed his first song, Sun in Heart (心中的太阳), for Snowing City (雪城). He is also well known for performing theme songs to historical television dramas, such as The One Who Wins the Hearts of the People Gains the Empire (得民心者得天下) for the 1996 series Yongzheng Dynasty, and Heroes' Song (好汉歌), for the 1998 series The Water Margin. His song Asking Myself a Thousand Times (千萬次的問) remained in the top position for ten weeks on Chinese radio stations. In 1990, Liu performed the official theme song, Asian Mighty Winds (亚洲雄风), with Wei Wei at the 1990 Asian Games in Beijing.

On March 19, 2004, Liu held his first concert at the Capital Indoor Stadium, Beijing, called "Huange 2004" (欢歌2004). Other singers included Na Ying, Sun Nan, Sha Baoliang, and Warren Mok. In 2006, Liu held his second concert in the Shanghai Indoor Stadium, with fellow singers Na Ying, Sun Nan, Warren Mok, and Song Zuying present as guests. On July 3, 2007, Liu, Liao Changyong and Warren Mok held a "Zhenhan" music concert in the Great Hall of the People, Beijing. The singers introduced a blend of popular and classical music in their performance. On August 8, 2008, Liu appeared in front of an international audience, performing the official theme song You and Me with British singer Sarah Brightman at the 2008 Summer Olympics Opening Ceremony in Beijing. Liu also featured in the 2008 Beijing Olympics song, Beijing Welcomes You.

In 2012, Liu was asked to act as one of the four judges on The Voice of China, a singing talent show broadcast on Zhejiang TV. The other three judges were Na Ying, Yang Kun, and Harlem Yu. Liu returned again in 2017 as a new coach in Sing! China (a rebrand of The Voice of China), and emerged as the winning mentor (his finalist, Tashi Phuntsok 扎西平措, won the season).

On December 26, 2018, Liu founded "The Liu Huan Foundation of Original Music" (刘欢原创音乐基金) in collaboration with Mango TV and Mango V, the show's sponsors, in which CN¥ 1,000,000 (approximately US$150,000) of the funding would be spent every January 11 (the date of the show's premiere episode) to sponsor a singer. Liu was also the series ambassador and would promote the Mango TV app before each episode to encourage viewers across the world to watch the series.

In 2019, Liu returned to television to take part in Hunan TV's long-running singing competition Singer (I Am a Singer before 2017). On April 12, Liu was crowned the winner of Singer 2019. It was revealed in the finale that the song he chose for the final round, a three-song medley themed for Empress Xiaoshengxian, was made in tribute to Yao Beina, one of the contestants from the second season of The Voice of China, who died on January 16, 2015. It received a standing ovation from the panel of 500-member judges, and won the season with 62.22% of the votes cast, the highest score attained at the time.

== Teaching career ==
As well as being a singer-songwriter, Liu was a teacher. He had taught at the University of International Relations and taught the history of Western music at the Beijing University of International Business and Economics. "It's a good idea to bring music to more students in China," said Liu.

Despite his pop career in China, Liu was not willing to give up his secondary job, teaching, which he considered to be a stable career. Liu was very proud of the fact that he was one of the most popular teachers at the university. "There doesn't have to be any contradictions between being a singer and a teacher, although they are totally different jobs. I can focus on how to make students have more interest in music when I am in class, after that, I do have time to write songs. I am enjoying being a teacher." His classes were crowded with other students besides his own, who came to stand in the classroom to listen to his lectures.

"Liu is perfect for us to carry out the plan because he is such an iconic figure in China's music industry," says David Jin, president and country manager of China and Northeast Asia of Harman. "I am a teacher so I am close to the students and know their desire for music," Liu said. "Unlike our generation, today's students are active and curious about everything. They are not only interested in established musicians, but also new, alternative music."

During Liu's lectures, he would introduce foreign words when naming people, schools, and locations, using English, French, German, and Italian. Liu said "My major is French, and I can speak English, too. With German and Italian, I only know some terms in these languages, but it doesn't mean I can speak them."

== Personal life and death ==
Liu married Lu Lu, a hostess for Hunan TV, in 1988. Their daughter was born in September 1991. In mid-April 2010, he underwent successful hip replacement surgery at the Beijing University Third Hospital.

On April 3, 2020, Liu was confirmed to have been diagnosed with avascular necrosis.

Liu died on September 25, 2026, at the age of 63.

== Additional links ==
- "Liu Huan and His Music". China Radio International. October 31, 2003.
- Liu Huan discography at Discogs
- Liu Huan at IMDb

Preceded by Jessie J	Winner of I Am a Singer; Season 7; 2019	Succeeded by Hua Chenyu
