= Quanshan (disambiguation) =

Quanshan (泉山区) is a district of Xuzhou, Jiangsu, People's Republic of China (PRC).

Quanshan (泉山) may also refer to the following locations in the PRC:

- Quanshan, Gansu, town in Minle County
- Quanshan Subdistrict, Huainan, in Tianjia'an District, Huainan, Anhui
- Quanshan Subdistrict, Ulanqab, in Jining District, Ulanqab, Inner Mongolia
- Quanshan Subdistrict, Zhaoyuan, Shandong
