= Zhaoyuan, Shandong =

Zhaoyuan 招远市 Chaoyuan
- County-level city
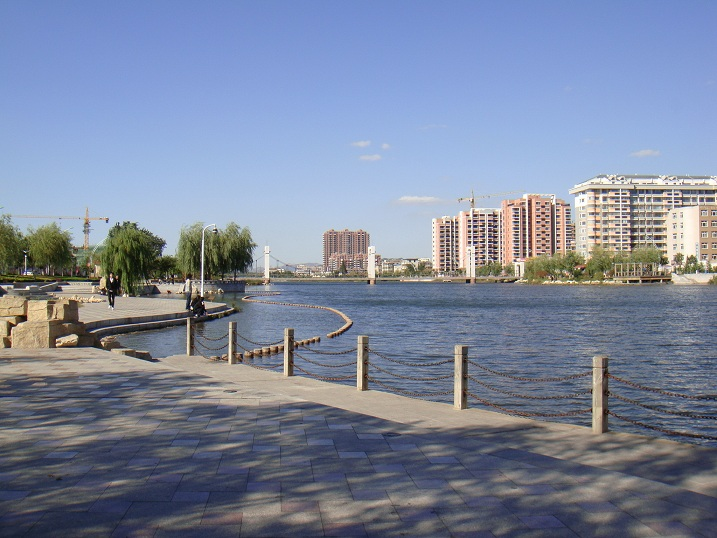

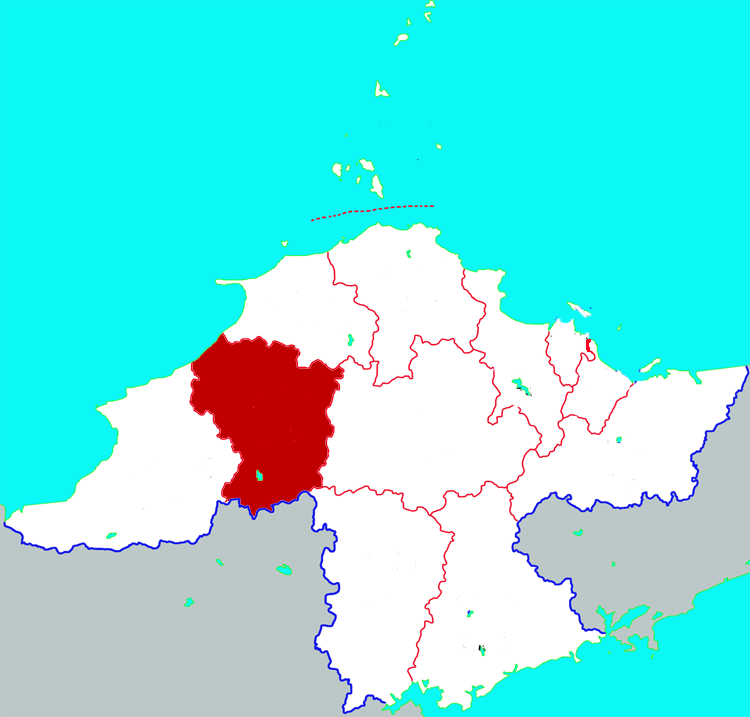
- Location in Yantai

- Location in Shandong
- Coordinates: 37°21′32.40″N 120°23′45.60″E
- Country: People's Republic of China
- Province: Shandong
- Prefecture-level city: Yantai

Area
  - Total: 1,432.32 km^{2} (553.02 sq mi)

Population (2019)
  - Total: 560,234
  - Density: 391.137/km^{2} (1,013.04/sq mi)
- Time zone: UTC+8 (China Standard)
- Postal code: 265400
- Website: www.zhaoyuan.gov.cn

Zhaoyuan
- Traditional Chinese: 招遠
- Simplified Chinese: 招远
- Postal: Chaoyuan
Transcriptions
Standard Mandarin
- Hanyu Pinyin: Zhāoyuǎn
- Wade–Giles: Chao^{1}-yüan^{3}

Zhaoyuan (simplified Chinese: 招远市; traditional Chinese: 招遠市; pinyin: Zhāoyuǎn Shì) is a county-level city within the prefecture-level city of Yantai, Shandong Province, China, located on the Bohai Sea. Zhaoyuan is well known for its abundant gold deposit and production, and is occasionally nicknamed "China's gold capital" (simplified Chinese: 中国金都; traditional Chinese: 中國金都).

The city spans an area of 1,432.32 square kilometres (553.02 mi^{2}), and has a population of 560,234 as of 2019.

== History ==
The area was first incorporated under the Han dynasty as Qucheng County (simplified Chinese: 曲成县; traditional Chinese: 曲成縣).

Gold was discovered at Zhaoyuan in the Tang dynasty. The myth accompanying the city's discovery of gold is that a giant tortoise named Ao once told villagers struggling with famine to dig, and upon digging, they struck gold.

The county was named Zhaoyuan County (simplified Chinese: 招远县; traditional Chinese: 招遠縣) in 1131.

=== People's Republic of China ===
Five townships in Zhaoyuan were upgraded to towns on September 1, 1988.

On December 21, 1991, Zhaoyuan was upgraded from a county to a county-level city.

Throughout the mid-1990s, three more townships were upgraded to towns.

On January 11, 1999, the town of Zhaocheng (simplified Chinese: 招城镇; traditional Chinese: 招城鎮) was divided into three subdistricts: Luofeng Subdistrict, Quanshan Subdistrict, and Mengzhi Subdistrict.

The Fifth National Population Census of the People's Republic of China reported that Zhaoyuan had a population of 593,705.

On December 19, 2000, Dahuchenjia Township (simplified Chinese: 大户陈家乡; traditional Chinese: 大戶陳家鄉) became the city's last township to be upgraded to a town.

==== 2014 murder of Wu Shuoyan ====
In late May 2014, five members of The Church of Almighty God, an outlawed new-age cult, entered a McDonald's in Zhaoyuan and began soliciting customers' phone numbers. When 37 year-old Wu Shuoyan refused to give her phone number to the group, they claimed she was an "evil spirit", and began beating her with chairs and a metal mop handle, ultimately killing her. In February 2015, two of the attackers were executed, and the other three received jail sentences ranging from seven years to life.

== Geography ==
Zhaoyuan's city center is located approximately 90 kilometres (56 mi) southwest of Yantai's urban center. The city's terrain is higher in the northeast, middle and west, and lower in the northwest and southeast

=== Climate ===
The city's annual average temperature is 11 °C (52 °F), and its annual average precipitation is 607.3 millimetres (23.91 in).

Climate data for Zhaoyuan, elevation 118 m (387 ft), (1991–2020 normals, extremes 1981–present)
Month	Jan	Feb	Mar	Apr	May	Jun	Jul	Aug	Sep	Oct	Nov	Dec	Year
Record high °C (°F)	14.4 (57.9)	20.5 (68.9)	28.1 (82.6)	33.7 (92.7)	36.8 (98.2)	40.6 (105.1)	37.8 (100.0)	37.2 (99.0)	34.4 (93.9)	30.1 (86.2)	24.5 (76.1)	18.2 (64.8)	40.6 (105.1)
Mean daily maximum °C (°F)	2.3 (36.1)	5.4 (41.7)	11.8 (53.2)	18.9 (66.0)	24.9 (76.8)	28.8 (83.8)	30.5 (86.9)	29.8 (85.6)	26.3 (79.3)	19.9 (67.8)	11.8 (53.2)	4.5 (40.1)	17.9 (64.2)
Daily mean °C (°F)	−2.2 (28.0)	0.0 (32.0)	5.5 (41.9)	12.5 (54.5)	18.7 (65.7)	22.9 (73.2)	25.7 (78.3)	25.2 (77.4)	20.9 (69.6)	14.1 (57.4)	6.6 (43.9)	0.1 (32.2)	12.5 (54.5)
Mean daily minimum °C (°F)	−5.9 (21.4)	−4.2 (24.4)	0.5 (32.9)	6.9 (44.4)	13.1 (55.6)	18.0 (64.4)	21.9 (71.4)	21.5 (70.7)	16.4 (61.5)	9.3 (48.7)	2.5 (36.5)	−3.5 (25.7)	8.0 (46.5)
Record low °C (°F)	−16.5 (2.3)	−15.1 (4.8)	−9.8 (14.4)	−4.4 (24.1)	3.4 (38.1)	9.9 (49.8)	14.3 (57.7)	12.9 (55.2)	7.1 (44.8)	−1.4 (29.5)	−6.6 (20.1)	−12.5 (9.5)	−16.5 (2.3)
Average precipitation mm (inches)	7.3 (0.29)	10.9 (0.43)	13.0 (0.51)	28.5 (1.12)	53.2 (2.09)	68.6 (2.70)	180.6 (7.11)	158.5 (6.24)	53.1 (2.09)	27.3 (1.07)	24.6 (0.97)	12.1 (0.48)	637.7 (25.1)
Average precipitation days (≥ 0.1 mm)	4.2	3.8	3.3	5.1	7.3	8.2	11.4	11.4	6.7	5.6	5.0	5.9	77.9
Average snowy days	7.8	4.7	1.8	0.2	0	0	0	0	0	0	2.3	7.3	24.1
Average relative humidity (%)	66	62	55	54	60	69	79	81	73	69	68	67	67
Mean monthly sunshine hours	169.3	174.4	229.2	243.0	270.1	239.7	202.4	204.1	213.7	211.8	170.9	160.5	2,489.1
Percentage possible sunshine	55	57	62	61	61	54	46	49	58	62	57	54	56
Source: China Meteorological Administrationall-time August high

== Administrative divisions ==
Zhaoyuan administers five subdistricts and nine towns.

=== Subdistricts ===
Zhaoyuan's five subdistricts are Luofeng Subdistrict, Quanshan Subdistrict, Mengzhi Subdistrict, Wenquan Subdistrict, and Daqinjia Subdistrict.

=== Towns ===
Zhaoyuan's nine towns are Xinzhuang, Canzhuang, Jinling, Biguo, Linglong, Zhangxing, Xiadian, Fushan, and Qishan.

== Land use ==
In the context of rapid urbanization and industrialization, Zhaoyuan faces problems of idle and wasteful use of rural settlements.

== Economy ==
The city has a significant amount of gold deposits, largely concentrated in its northeast. Zhaojin Mining has its headquarters located in the city. Additionally, Linglong Tire is headquartered in the city.

== Transport ==
National Highway 206 runs through Zhaoyuan.

== Tourist attractions ==
A large golden statue of Ao, a Chinese mythical giant turtle is located in the village of Oujiakuang (Chinese: 欧家夼村; pinyin: Ōujiākuǎng Cūn), in the town of Linglong. Located in Luoshan National Forest Park (simplified Chinese: 罗山国家森林公园; traditional Chinese: 羅山國家森林公園), the statue is Asia's largest statue of Ao, and is located at 37°27′36″N 120°28′22″E. The statue is 15 meters tall and 20 meters long.

The Qucheng Ancient City Site is located in Zhaoyuan.

== Notable people ==
- Chi Haotian, PLA General, Minister of National Defense of the People's Republic of China
- Sun Baoguo, BTBU Professor, Academician of Chinese Academy of Engineering
