= Sing My Song season 3 =

Sing My Song
- Season 3
- Hosted by: Yang Fan (杨帆)
- Judges: Yu Quan; Mavis Fan; Liu Huan; David Tao
- No. of contestants: 52
- Winner: Mountain People band (山人乐队)
- Winning mentor: Liu Huan
- Runner-up: Wang Wu (王兀)

Release
- Original network: CCTV-3
- Original release: January 29 – April 8, 2016

Season chronology
- ← Previous; Season 2

Sing My Song (season 3) was broadcast on CCTV-3 from January 29, 2016, to April 8, 2016, presented by Yang Fan (杨帆). Yu Quan and Liu Huan both returned as tutors. Tanya Chua and Wakin Chau did not return this season, allowing new tutors Mavis Fan and David Tao to join the panel. The winner was Mountain People band (山人乐队) of Liu Huan team and Wang Wu (王兀) of David Tao team was the runner-up.

== Tutors and Finalists ==
Diagram	Winner	Runner-up	Eliminated in the final stage (by audience votes) and arrived at the third-place
Diagram	Eliminated in the battle stage	Eliminated in the composer round	Eliminated in the selection round

Tutor	Contestant		
Yu Quan	He Jiale (何佳乐)	Man Jiang (满江)	Wang Huizhu (王彙筑)
Yu Quan	Kelly Yu (于文文)	Liang Dongjiang (梁栋江)	Shu Zi (树子)
Yu Quan	Xing Tiansu (邢天溯)	Fang Yi (方毅)	Wang Ao (王傲)
Yu Quan	Chen Yi (沈懿)	Ji Xing (冀行)	Liu Jinze (劉錦澤)
Mavis Fan	AR	Xu Yuan (徐苑)	Li Liangchen (李亮辰)
Mavis Fan	Liu Wei (刘维)	Zhang Xi (张希)	Bo Xinghui (卜星慧)
Mavis Fan	Ji Qiuyang (季秋洋)	Yan Xinlong (閆鑫瀧)	Milk Coffee (牛奶咖啡)
Mavis Fan	Ge Xiwa (葛西瓦)	Liu Xiaoying (劉曉盈)	Liang Zi (梁子)
Liu Huan	Mountain People band (山人乐队)	Ceng Zhaowei (曾昭玮)	Sha Nanjie (沙楠傑)
Liu Huan	Luo Yiheng (罗艺恒)	Song Yuning (宋宇宁)	Qiu Bi (邱比)
Liu Huan	He Dahe (何大河)	Sun Xiao (孙晓)	Astro Bunny (原子邦妮)
Liu Huan	Shu Ke (舒克)	Zhu Jingxi (朱婧汐)	Pi Yiran (皮怡然)
David Tao	Wang Wu (王兀)	Apple Garden combination (苹果园组合)	Nan Zheng Bei Shan (南征北战)
David Tao	Jia Ba A San (贾巴阿叄)	Jonathan Wong (王梓軒)	Li Yizhe (李一哲)
David Tao	Yi Erpan·Ishaq (伊尔盼·伊斯哈克)	Ding Shuang (丁爽)	Wang Qi (王启)
David Tao	Zhou Ziyan (周子琰)	A Lai (阿來)	Adrian Fu (符致逸)
Bold names are artists who have been given the straight access pass by their respective coach.

== The blind audition ==
=== The blind audition ===
A special rule was added from season 2, each tutor has 3 chances to press the "straight access" button. If a contestant is chosen by that button of any tutor and they also choose that tutor, they can pass directly the selection round after.

Key	Producers pushes his or her control bar	The producer "straight access" key is pressed	Contestant eliminated with no producer pushing his or her control bar	Contestant defaulted to this producer's album	Contestant elected to join this producer's album	The part was not broadcast as a complete version

==== Episode 1 (January 29) ====
Episode 1 on CCTV's official YouTube channel

Opening special performances
Singer	Song	Author/Note
David Tao	Run (奔跑)	Yu Quan
Mavis Fan	Night (夜)	Liu Huan
Hu Haiquan	You Must Marry To Me Today (今天你要嫁给我)	David Tao
Liu Huan	Where I'm Going ? (我要去哪里)	Mavis Fan
Liu Huan ft. Mavis Fan ft. Hu Haiquan ft. David Tao	Sing My Song (唱我的歌)	Theme song

Order	Contestant	Song	Producer's and contestant's choices			
Order	Contestant	Song	Yu Quan	Mavis Fan	Liu Huan	David Tao
1	AR; Age 21, Guangdong, Guangzhou	刷刷刷刷 (Swipe swipe swipe swipe; Shuā shuā shuā shuā)				
2	Luo Yiheng (罗艺恒) (Laurence Larson); Age 21, New Zealand	爱过 (Loved; Àiguò)				
3	Huang Xiaoning (黄晓宁); Age 72, Taiwan	老歌手 (Old singer; Lǎo gēshǒu)	—	—	—	—
4	Liu Wei (刘维); Age 29, Liaoning, Anshan	因为你是范晓萱 (Because you are Mavis Fan; Yīnwèi nǐ shì fànxiǎoxuān)				
5	Apple Garden combination (苹果园组合); Gao Lei (高磊); Age 32, Beijing, Mentougou; Yu Wenfei (余文飞); Age 28, Chongqing, Banan	飞鱼 (Flying fish; Fēiyú)				
6	Jia Ba A San (贾巴阿叄); Age 32, Sichuan, Liangshan	晨曦 (Dawn; Chénxī)				

==== Episode 2 (February 5) ====
Episode 2 on CCTV's official YouTube channel

Order	Contestant	Song	Producer's and contestant's choices			
Order	Contestant	Song	Yu Quan	Mavis Fan	Liu Huan	David Tao
1	Kelly Yu (于文文); Age 26, Canada	心跳 (Heartbeat; Xīntiào)				
2	Song Yuning (宋宇宁); Age 21, Heilongjiang, Harbin	哎呀 跌倒了 (Damn, fell down !; Āiyā diédǎole)				
3	Yi Erpan·Ishaq (伊尔盼·伊斯哈克); Age 26, Xinjiang, Ürümqi	母亲 (Mother; Mǔqīn)	—	—		
4	Zhang Xi (张希); Age 26, Liaoning, Shenyang	刀子嘴 地雷心 (Knife in mouth, landmine in heart; Dāozizuǐ dìléi xīn)	—		—	
5	Liang Dongjiang (梁栋江); Age 23, Heilongjiang, Qiqihar	你为了多少人哭 (How many people did you cry for; Nǐ wèile duōshǎo rén kū)		—	—	
6	He Dahe (何大河); Age 21, Zhejiang, Huzhou	猪老三 (The third youngest pig; Zhū lǎo sān)				
7	Mountain People band (山人乐队); Formed in 1999, Yunnan / Guizhou	三十年 (30 years; Sānshí nián)				

==== Episode 3 (February 12) ====
Episode 3 on CCTV's official YouTube channel

Order	Contestant	Song	Producer's and contestant's choices			
Order	Contestant	Song	Yu Quan	Mavis Fan	Liu Huan	David Tao
1	Ding Shuang (丁爽); Age 32, Liaoning, Shenyang	预备爱 (Preparatory love; Yùbèi ài)		—		
2	Xing Tiansu (邢天溯); Age 37, Heilongjiang, Harbin	我们在蓝色海上漂 (We float in the blue sea; Wǒmen zài lán sè hǎishàng piào)			—	—
3	Sun Xiao (孙晓); Age 26, Beijing	春节 (Chinese New Year; Chūnjié)		—		—
4	Nan Zheng Bei Shan (南征北战); Formed in 2007, Liaoning / Guangxi / Yunnan	回忆 (Memories; Huíyì)				
5	Fang Yi (方毅); Age 27, Fujian, Putian	与父相谈 (Talking with father; Yǔ fù xiāng tán)		—	—	—
6	Bo Xinghui (卜星慧); Age 26, Taiwan, Kaohsiung	完美情谊 (Perfect friendship; Wánměi qíngyì)			—	
7	Shu Zi (树子); Age 37, Chongqing	画 (Painting; Huà)				

==== Episode 4 (February 19) ====
Episode 4 on CCTV's official YouTube channel

Order	Contestant	Song	Producer's and contestant's choices			
Order	Contestant	Song	Yu Quan	Mavis Fan	Liu Huan	David Tao
1	Ceng Zhaowei (曾昭玮); Age 34, Beijing	迷路了问问道 (Lost and asking for directions; Mílùle wèn wèn dào)		—		—
2	He Jiale (何佳乐); Age 24, Hebei, Shijiazhuang	是我 (It's me; Shì wǒ)			—	—
3	Wang Qi (王启); Age 25, Henan, Qinyang	你快走开 (You go away; Nǐ kuàizǒu kāi)	—	—	—	
4	Man Jiang (满江); Age 43, Beijing	归来 (Return; Guīlái)		—	—	
5	Xu Yuan (徐苑); Age 32, Hunan, Changsha	追 (Chase; Zhuī)				
6	Li Liangchen (李亮辰); Age 25, Jiangsu, Nanjing	赌局 (Gambling; Dǔjú)				
7	Ji Qiuyang (季秋洋); Age 28, Sichuan, Guang'an	不能没有你 (Can't live without you; Bùnéng méiyǒu nǐ)			—	—

==== Episode 5 (February 26) ====
Episode 5 on CCTV's official YouTube channel

Order	Contestant	Song	Producer's and contestant's choices			
Order	Contestant	Song	Yu Quan	Mavis Fan	Liu Huan	David Tao
1	Wang Ao (王傲); Age 30, Sichuan	等待 (Wait; Děngdài)			—	—
2	Yan Xinlong (閆鑫瀧); Age 27, Chongqing	望 (Hope; Wàng)	—		—	—
3	Zhou Ziyan (周子琰); Age 20, Hebei, Baoding	撕裂 (Split tear; Sī liè)	—	—	—	
4	A Lai (阿來); Age 26, Xinjiang, Ürümqi	不 (Don't; Bù)	—	—	—	
5	Chen Yi (沈懿); Age 32, Taiwan	大鬧天宮 (Big uproar on paradise; Dà nào tiāngōng)		—	—	
6	Astro Bunny (原子邦妮); Taiwan	美人淚 (Beauty tears; Měirén lèi)	—	—		
7	Shu Ke (舒克); Age 29, Inner Mongolia, Hohhot	三百弄 (Hello (Mongolian language); Sānbǎi nòng)				—
8	Wang Wu (王兀); Age 29, Liaoning, Anshan, Haicheng	啦啦曲 (La la song; Lā lā qū)		—	—	
9	Jonathan Wong (王梓軒); Age 29, Hong Kong	碰不上會更美 (Don't touch on will be more beautiful; Pèng bù shàng huì gèng měi)				
10	Ji Xing (冀行); Age 23, Hebei, Baoding	雪蓮 (Snow lotus; Xuělián)		—	—	
11	Milk Coffee (牛奶咖啡); Beijing	Let you go	—		—	—
12	Wang Huizhu (王彙筑); Age 23, Taiwan	救護車 (Ambulance; Jiùhù chē)			—	
13	Qiu Bi (邱比); Age 24, Taiwan	整夜大雨後 (After the heavy rain overnight; Zhěng yè dàyǔ hòu)				

==== Episode 6 (March 3) ====
Episode 6 on CCTV's official YouTube channel

Order	Contestant	Song	Producer's and contestant's choices			
Order	Contestant	Song	Yu Quan	Mavis Fan	Liu Huan	David Tao
1	Zhu Jingxi (朱婧汐); Age 27, Yunnan, Pu'er	心碎大道 (Heartbreak avenue; Xīn suì dàdào)	—	—		—
2	Ge Xiwa (葛西瓦); Age 35, Taiwan	山上拉釘人 (Rivet mountain people; Shānshàng lā dīng rén)			—	
3	Li Yizhe (李一哲); Age 29, Hebei	堅強打死愛哭鬼 (Strong killing crybaby; Jiānqiáng dǎ sǐ ài kū guǐ)		—		
4	Liu Xiaoying (劉曉盈); Age 19, Hong Kong	獻給冥王星的歌 (Song dedicated to Pluto; Xiàn gěi míngwángxīng de gē)			—	—
5	Adrian Fu (符致逸); Age 39, Hong Kong	再見 (Goodbye; Zàijiàn)		—	—	
6	Liang Zi (梁子); Age 33, Sichuan, Chengdu	我倆 (Us; Wǒ liǎ)			—	FULL
Revival round						FULL
7	Sha Nanjie (沙楠傑); Age 22, Sichuan, Liangshan	給你所需 (Give what you need; Gěi nǐ suǒ xū)		FULL		FULL
8	Ding Bei (丁蓓); Age 23, New Zealand	愛 (Love; Ài)	—	FULL	—	FULL
9	Lin Kailun (林凱倫); Age 18, United States	漫遊 (Roaming; Mànyóu)	—	FULL	—	FULL
10	Zheng Jiajia (鄭嘉嘉); Age 31, Hong Kong	哎呀愛 (Oh! Love; Āiyā ài)	—	FULL	—	FULL
11	Liu Jinze (劉錦澤); Age 34, Heilongjiang	十點半的地鐵 (Subway at 10:30; Shí diǎn bàn dì dìtiě)		FULL	—	FULL
12	Pi Yiran (皮怡然); Age 23, Hunan, Yueyang	她他 (He she; Tā tā)	FULL	FULL		FULL

=== The second time of selection ===
This part was broadcast at the end of episode 6. Each tutor must choose 6 best performances between their 12 choices after the blind audition (exclude the performances was chosen by "straight access" button). 6 contestant groups, who are chosen by tuteur, advance in the composer round and their music products will be certainly in their tutor album.

== The composer and the battle stage ==
=== Voted by the team tutor ===
In each team, six contestants divided into three pairs, each contestant of each pair had to compose a new song following the title of, a Chinese film or Chinese television series, chosen by their tutor, then they performed their new songs on the same stage.

The winner of each pair, selected by their tutor, could be advanced to the next round. The three other tutors could also voted for the song that they liked to listen but it didn't have any influence on the principal team tutor's choice.

Diagram	Advanced to the next round	Eliminated

==== Episode 7 (March 11) ====
Episode 7 on CCTV's official YouTube channel

===== Liu Huan team - "Happy Commune" (歡樂公社) =====
Subject	Order	Contestant	Song	Other tutor's choice
Surprise (萬萬沒想到)	1	Sha Nanjie (沙楠傑)	萬萬沒想到 (Did not expect absolutely; Wàn wàn méi xiǎngdào)	Mavis Fan
Surprise (萬萬沒想到)	2	Luo Yiheng (罗艺恒)	沒想到的夢 (The dream did not expect; Méi xiǎngdào de mèng)	Yu Quan; David Tao
Empresses in the Palace (甄嬛傳)	3	Qiu Bi (邱比)	你的一切都是我的風格 (Everything of you is my style; Nǐ de yīqiè dōu shì wǒ de fēnggé)	Yu Quan; Mavis Fan; David Tao
Empresses in the Palace (甄嬛傳)	4	Ceng Zhaowei (曾昭玮)	幸虧沒生在古代 (Fortunately, not born in the ancient times; Xìngkuī méi shēng zài gǔdài)	—
The Water Margin (水浒传)	5	Song Yuning (宋宇宁)	別給我打電話 (Don't call me; Bié gěi wǒ dǎ diànhuà)	—
The Water Margin (水浒传)	6	Mountain People band (山人乐队)	上山下 (On Xia mountain; Shàng shānxià)	Yu Quan; Mavis Fan; David Tao

===== Mavis Fan team - "Happy with the Alliance" (開心著聯盟) =====
Subject	Order	Contestant	Song	Other tutor's choice
A Chinese Odyssey Part Two: Cinderella (大話西遊)	1	AR	Only You	Yu Quan; David Tao
A Chinese Odyssey Part Two: Cinderella (大話西遊)	2	Zhang Xi (张希)	我就是那個竄天猴 (I was channelled as monkey that day; Wǒ jiùshì nàgè cuàn tiān hóu)	Liu Huan
Perhaps Love (如果·愛)	3	Liu Wei (刘维)	麵包的故事 (Bread story; Miànbāo de gùshì)	Yu Quan
Perhaps Love (如果·愛)	4	Li Liangchen (李亮辰)	再 在 (Be again; Zài zài)	Liu Huan; David Tao
Crazy Stone (疯狂的石头)	5	Xu Yuan (徐苑)	碌碌有為 (Mediocre promise; Lùlù yǒu wéi)	Liu Huan
Crazy Stone (疯狂的石头)	6	Bo Xinghui (卜星慧)	別說晚安 (Don't say goodnight; Bié shuō wǎn'ān)	Yu Quan; David Tao

==== Episode 8 (March 18) ====
Episode 8 on CCTV's official YouTube channel

===== David Tao team - "No Two Team" (無二戰隊) =====
Subject	Order	Contestant	Song	Other tutor's choice
Crouching Tiger, Hidden Dragon (臥虎藏龍)	1	Nan Zheng Bei Shan (南征北战)	獨一無二 (Unique; Dúyīwú'èr)	Liu Huan
Crouching Tiger, Hidden Dragon (臥虎藏龍)	2	Li Yizhe (李一哲)	藏龍臥虎 (Canglongwohu; Cánglóngwòhǔ) (Note: Chinese expression : The place where dragons and tigers are hiding.)	Yu Quan; Mavis Fan
My Fair Princess (還珠格格)	3	Jia Ba A San (贾巴阿叄)	思念不過是一次飄過麥田的風浪 (Sīniàn bùguò shì yīcì piāoguò màitián de fēnglàng)	Yu Quan
My Fair Princess (還珠格格)	4	Wang Wu (王兀)	同日同月同星曲 (On the same day, the same month and the same zodiac star; Tóngrì tóngyuè tóng xīng qū)	Mavis Fan; Liu Huan
Infernal Affairs (無間道)	5	Jonathan Wong (王梓軒)	我是誰 (Who am I; Wǒ shì shuí)	Yu Quan
Infernal Affairs (無間道)	6	Apple Garden combination (苹果园组合)	黑與白 (Black and white; Hēi yǔ bái)	Mavis Fan; Liu Huan

===== Yu Quan team - "Masters Team" (巨匠戰隊) =====
Subject	Order	Contestant	Song	Other tutor's choice
Meteor Garden (流星花園)	1	Wang Huizhu (王彙筑)	雜草 (Weed; Zá cǎo)	Mavis Fan
Meteor Garden (流星花園)	2	Kelly Yu (于文文)	一夜成長 (One night growing up; Yīyè chéngzhǎng)	Liu Huan; David Tao
Bloom of Youth (与青春有关的日子)	3	Shu Zi (树子)	走過青春的路邊 (The youth through street; Zǒuguò qīngchūn de lù biān)	—
Bloom of Youth (与青春有关的日子)	4	Man Jiang (满江)	黑暗中的舞蹈 (Dancing in the dark; Hēi'àn zhōng de wǔdǎo)	Mavis Fan; Liu Huan; David Tao
Journey to the West (西遊記)	5	He Jiale (何佳乐)	舍離斷 (Break away from the house; Shě lí duàn)	Mavis Fan; David Tao
Journey to the West (西遊記)	6	Liang Dongjiang (梁栋江)	夢是什麼 (What is the dream; Mèng shì shénme)	Liu Huan

=== Voted by 51 media juries ===
The four tutors have made together a lucky drawing to search the opposite team for their team, so the result was the battle between Liu Huan team and David Tao team, between Mavis Fan team and Yu Quan team.

The contestant in each battle pair was decided by their team tutor; each contestant had to compose another new song to perform and the winner of each pair was the person who won the highest number of 51 media jury votes.

The six final winners of this round represented their teams to perform on the final stage. Because the format of this battle is direct elimination, so impossible to ignore the case that a team would be all eliminated or would be all advanced.

Few Sing My Song's ex-contestants appeared in the media jury panel like Wang Xiaotian (王晓天) (Season 1, Yang Kun team's Top 8), Su Yunying (苏运莹) (Tanya Chua team, Season 2's runner-up), Luo Er (裸儿) (Liu Huan team, Season 2's Top 8).

Diagram	Advanced to the final stage	Eliminated

==== Episode 9 (March 25) – Mavis Fan team VS Yu Quan team ====
Episode 9 on CCTV's official YouTube channel

Order	Team	Contestant	Song	Score (voted by 51 media juries)
1	Mavis Fan	Li Liangchen (李亮辰)	有一塊青苔很明顯 (There is obviously a moss; Yǒu yīkuài qīngtái hěn míngxiǎn)	22
1	Yu Quan	Man Jiang (满江)	Mr.Man	29
2	Mavis Fan	Xu Yuan (徐苑)	孤城 (Isolated city; Gūchéng)	22
2	Yu Quan	He Jiale (何佳乐)	雲花開 (Cloud bloom; Yún huā kāi)	29
3	Mavis Fan	AR	I don't care	39
3	Yu Quan	Wang Huizhu (王彙筑)	只要我長大 (As long as I grew up; Zhǐyào wǒ zhǎngdà)	12

==== Episode 10 (April 1) – Liu Huan team VS David Tao team ====
Episode 10 on CCTV's official YouTube channel

Opening performance
Singer	Song
Su Yunying	Deep and bright (冥明)

Order	Team	Contestant	Song	Score (voted by 51 media juries)
1	David Tao	Wang Wu (王兀)	歸期 (Return date; Guīqī)	29
1	Liu Huan	Sha Nanjie (沙楠傑)	我聽不見 (I can't hear; Wǒ tīng bùjiàn)	22
2	David Tao	Apple Garden combination (苹果园组合)	畢業照片 (Graduation's photos; Bìyè zhàopiàn)	15
2	Liu Huan	Ceng Zhaowei (曾昭玮)	妞兒說 (Dolls says; Niū er shuō)	36
3	David Tao	Nan Zheng Bei Shan (南征北战)	驕傲的少年 (Proud teenager; Jiāo'ào de shàonián)	11
3	Liu Huan	Mountain People band (山人乐队)	山人 (Hermit; Shān rén)	40

== Episode 11 (April 8) - Final ==
Episode 11 on CCTV's official YouTube channel

The six contestants could chosen the best of their songs in the previous rounds to perform one by one, with their tutor or their tutor guest. After the 3rd, 4th, 5th, 6th performance, the audience have voted directly to eliminate a contestant of the triple at this moment.

The two last contestants with their songs was voted publicly by 101 media juries. The song that won the highest vote would take the title "Best Chinese Song of the Year", that contestant would become the winner and would take the final cup of Sing My Song.

Special performance
Singer	Song
Nan Zheng Bei Shan (南征北战)	Proud teenager (驕傲的少年)
Mavis Fan team's contestants (except Bo Xinghui (卜星慧) and Milk Coffee (牛奶咖啡))	Because you are Mavis Fan (因为你是范晓萱)

=== Result ===
Note	David Tao team	Mavis Fan team	Liu Huan team	Yu Quan team

1. Man Jiang (满江); Song : Mr. Man; (ft. Han Hong ft. Yu Quan)	2. Ceng Zhaowei (曾昭玮); Song : 妞兒說; (ft. Sha Baoliang)	3. He Jiale (何佳乐); Song : 舍離斷; (ft. Dai Quan (戴荃))
Man Jiang (满江); Song : Mr. Man	He Jiale (何佳乐); Song : 舍離斷	4. Wang Wu (王兀); Song : 同日同月同星曲; (ft. Kit Chan)
Man Jiang (满江); Song : Mr. Man	Wang Wu (王兀); Song : 同日同月同星曲	5. Mountain People band (山人乐队); Song : 上山下 (mix 山人); (ft. Jike Junyi (吉克隽逸))
Wang Wu (王兀); Song : 同日同月同星曲	Mountain People band (山人乐队); Song : 上山下 (mix 山人)	6. AR; Song : 刷刷刷刷; (ft. Landy Wen ft. Mavis Fan)
Wang Wu (王兀); Song : 同日同月同星曲 (49 votes of 101 media juries)	Mountain People band (山人乐队); Song : 上山下 (mix 山人) (52 votes of 101 media juries)
Mountain People band (山人乐队); Song : 上山下 (mix 山人) (Song of the Year)

=== Top 10 Songs of Sing My Song (season 3) ===
Top 10 songs was synthesized on internet by votes of the media and the spectators. Each winner receive a blue trophy symbolized the G-clef in music.

Order	Contestant	Team	Song
1	Liu Wei (刘维)	Mavis Fan	Because you are Mavis Fan (因为你是范晓萱)
2	He Dahe (何大河)	Liu Huan	The third youngest pig (猪老三)
3	Xu Yuan (徐苑)	Mavis Fan	Chase (追)
4	Liu Jinze (劉錦澤)	Yu Quan	Subway at 10:30 (十點半的地鐵)
5	Apple Garden combination (苹果园组合)	David Tao	Flying fish (飞鱼)
6	Nan Zheng Bei Shan (南征北战)	David Tao	Memories (回忆)
7	Ceng Zhaowei (曾昭玮)	Liu Huan	Lost and asking for directions (迷路了问问道)
8	Wang Wu (王兀)	David Tao	On the same day, the same month and the same zodiac star (同日同月同星曲)
9	Man Jiang (满江)	Yu Quan	Return (归来)
10	Jia Ba A San (贾巴阿叄)	David Tao	Dawn (晨曦)
