= Jonathan Wong =

Jonathan Wong Chee-Hynn
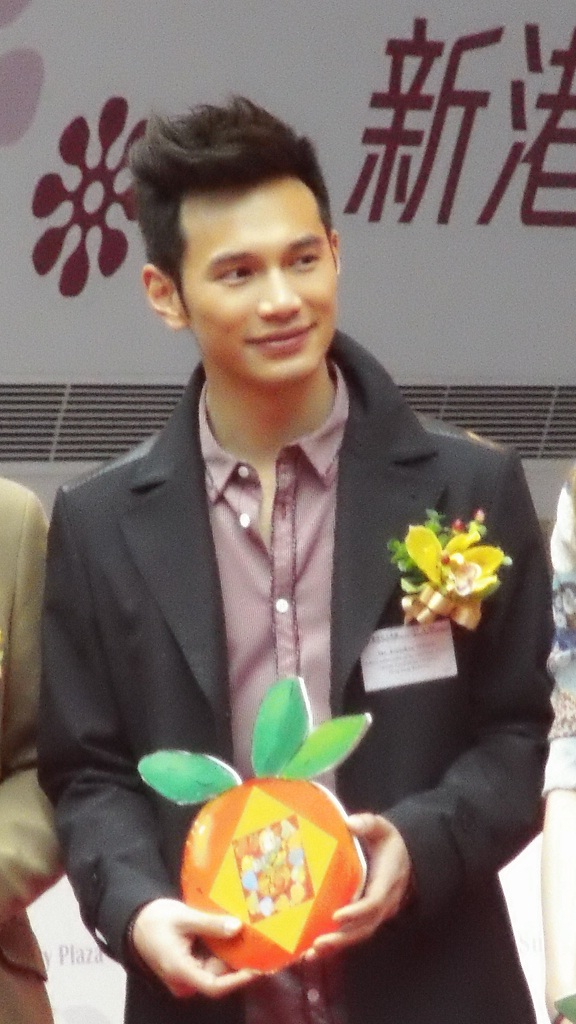
- Wong in 2013
- Born: June 3, 1986 (age 40); United States
- Education: Cornell University (United States), double major in Psychology and Dance
- Occupations: Singer-songwriter; composer; actor; producer
- Years active: 2009–present

Chinese name
- Traditional Chinese: 王梓軒
- Simplified Chinese: 王梓轩
Transcriptions
Standard Mandarin
- Hanyu Pinyin: Wáng Zǐ Xuān
Yue: Cantonese
- Jyutping: Wong4 Zi2 Hin1
- Musical career
- Also known as: Jon, JWo
- Origin: Hong Kong, China
- Genres: Pop, R&B
- Instruments: Violin, Piano
- Labels: OMF Music Inc. Limited; Avex (HK) (2010-2013年)(Distributed by Avex Japan)
- Website: jon-wong.com

Jonathan Wong Chee-Hynn (王梓軒), born June 3, 1986, is a Hong Kong singer-songwriter, actor and producer.

== Biography ==
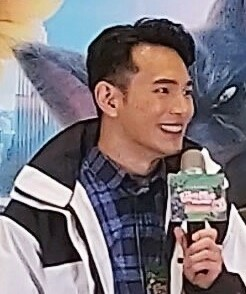
Wong in 2019

Born in the United States, Wong picked up the piano and violin at the age of 6 and began taking a serious interest in dance during his high school years at Milton Academy.

Wong is trained in various martial arts. Judo (since age 11), Wrestling (varsity team in high school), Hung Kuen (洪拳), Wing Chun (詠春) and San Da (散打) since 2012.

Wong graduated from Cornell University in 2008, double majoring in Psychology and Dance, where he sang in the Cornell University Glee Club and also was music director and arranger for the university's premiere all-male a cappella group Last Call. His vocal arrangements and solo performances helped Last Call secure numerous national and international awards, while his achievements in dance made him the single recipient of the 2008 Cornell Undergraduate Artist Award.

He joined the Hong Kong music industry in 2009 and has since released four Cantonese albums – Beyond Singing, Spectrum and Out of Frame, one Mandarin album – Rising and two Japanese singles. His singles became instant hits on the Hong Kong and Guangzhou pop charts and have earned him over 50 music awards in the new singer and singer-songwriter categories thus far.

In 2010, Wong joined Avex Group, a top music label in Japan, and became the first ever international artist jointly developed by the group's domestic and international departments.

Wong accomplished a series of professional developments in 2011. He became a talk show host in a popular TVB J2 Channel program called Big Boys Club from August 2011, and has been a host of that show till now. On the same year, Jonathan was invited by Tokyo’s TBS TV Station to represent Hong Kong and lead an A Cappella group as its conductor and arranger to compete against the Japanese team at a prime time international talent show. Jonathan and his team defeated their Japanese competitors.

In May 2012, Wong was invited to be a guest composer at the Hong Kong University of Science and Technology's (HKUST's) "The Intimacy of Creativity" concert presented by Prof Bright Sheng, one of the world's best known composers/ conductors. At the concert he performed also as a vocalist for his own composition with a group of award-winning international and regional musicians and composers. In June, Wong released his first Mandarin album Rising. Songs on the album became pop-chart favorites and received critical acclaims for his efforts to collaborate with top-notch producers/ singer-songwriters including Eric Kwok, Edward Chan, Hins Cheung, Taz Tan, Khalil Fong and Chiu Tsang Hei.

On August 10–11, 2012, Wong held his debut solo concert at the Hong Kong Convention and Exhibition Centre to thousands of fans. The two full-house concerts was a big success, and Jonathan's multiple talents in singing, dancing, music composition and instrumental performances won immense audience and media support.

In April 2013, released his first single of the year "跳火坑 Double Down".

In February 2014, Wong released "你最好 All of You".

On September 29, 2014, Wong released his fifth album A Fighter's Confession 戰士。告白 on iTunes Worldwide. The album includes 14 songs, including chart-topping No.1 songs "跳火坑 Double Down", "你最好 All of You", and "千色 Fighting For". "Fighting For", which was also the name of the short musical, was selected by the Hanoi International Film Festival 2014 to premiere in Asia, and was the only Hong Kong short film to be in competition with 30 other shorts.

In addition to singing and hosting TV talk shows, Wong also acts in TV dramas and films. His roles include: a policeman in Tales from the Dark Part 1; a martial arts fighter in Ip Man: The Final Fight (葉問: 終極一戰); a terrorist in a TVB action drama series Tiger Cubs 2 (飛虎2); an adroit young entrepreneur in Queen Divas (新抱喜相逢); and a law enforcer in The Battles of Tomorrow (再戰明天).

In Limelight Years (2015), Wong plays an exceptionally gifted musician driven to the edge of his sanity by the pressures of life under the limelight. The role not only helped Wong earn his first "Best Supporting Actor in a Television Drama" nomination, it also earned him a part in Johnnie To's thriller Three (2016), which was critically acclaimed by local and international media critics including: The Hollywood Reporter and Variety.

In 2016, Wong joined the largest original singer-songwriting competition in the world, Sing My Song, which was aired extensively in China CCTV-3. He joined Chinese R&B legend David Tao's songwriting team and was the only Hong Kong representative to make it into the top 6 of his team. On the same year, the song "Beyond Borders" that he composed for singer Karen Mok has gathered more than 35 million click-through rate online. Since then, he has the privilege to have written songs for Karen Mok, Sammi Zheng, and China's pop boy band XNINE, etc.

In the past 2 years, Wong completed filming for motion pictures Love Only (2018), co-starring Korean pop idol Seungri, from BigBang; The House of Rising Sons (2018), a story based on legendary Hong Kong band, The Wynners; as well as the Dynasty Warriors (2020).

He has also finished filming three television series OMG, Your Honour (2018) of which he plays a talented young barrister searching for himself in the challenging world of law; a romantic comedy, Wonder Women (2019) in which he plays an entrepreneur who gives up everything to win the affections of a jaded businesswoman; and an action TV series Airport Security Unit (ASU) (2020) where he plays an amiable yet effective member of the airport special forces unit.

He performed in Matteo Ricci (2019), an original theatrical musical in which he plays the title role, Italian priest Matteo Ricci, the first westerner to enter the Forbidden City and be buried on Chinese soil.

== Discography ==
=== Chinese albums ===
- Beyond Singing 超越聲音 (CD+DVD) (Oct 27, 2009)
- Beyond Singing 超越聲音 (CD+DVD) 2nd Edition (December 4, 2009)
- Spectrum 超越東西 (CD+DVD) (March 31, 2010)
- Out Of Frame 超越格式 (CD+DVD) (April 8, 2011)
- Rising (CD+DVD) (June 9, 2012)
- A Fighter's Confession (CD+DVD) (September 30, 2014)

=== Digital singles ===
- "Double Down (跳火坑)" (April 23, 2013)
- "Double Down A Cappella Version Feat. Peter Hollens (April 23, 2013)
- "Invincible (萬夫莫敵)" (September 24, 2013)
- "All Of You (你最好)" (February 20, 2014)
- "Run" (June 15, 2014)
- "Fighting For" (千色) (August 7, 2014)
- "Good Fight" (次世代) (April 23, 2015)
- "Taste It Don't Waste It ft. Hanjin Tan" (點止冰冰 Feat. 陳奐仁) (July 10, 2015)
- "Grown Up Christmas List ft. Justin Lo" (December 24, 2015)
- "For the First Time" (碰不上會更美) (February 29, 2016)
- "All The Best" (平常心) (July 25, 2016)
- "Who Am I" (我是誰) x Trouze (Sept 26, 2016)
- "The Void" (寄居太虛) (Oct 8, 2018)
- "Gravity" (邊緣引力) (Oct 29, 2018)
- "Nocturne No.17" (夜曲17章) (Nov 27, 2018)

=== Japanese album ===
- "Kimi wa bara yori utsukushii 君は薔薇より美しい (CD+DVD)" (June 15, 2011)
- "Bokugiru 僕がいる (single)" (August, 2011)

== Filmography ==
=== Film / Micro film ===
Year	Title	Role
2012	Chow Sang Sang x Forevermark Romantic Micro Film Forever Kiss	Jonathan Wong
2013	Ip Man: The Final Fight	Ni Tang (倪湯)
2013	Tales from the Dark series	Police
2015	Opening Movie of Golden Rooster and Hundred Flowers Film Festival - Love Forever (我們遇見松花湖)	Wang Boyang (汪博洋)
2015	Patrick's Love Films - 紀念日	Wang Zhizong (王志宗)
2016	Three (三人行)	He Jianzhuang (何健壯)
2016	Micro Film - Seize the Second (流星飛過後許願前的一秒)	Michael (米高)
2018	Love Only	Dannie
2018	House of the Rising Sons	LE (力)
2019	The Great Detective (大侦探霍桑)	
2020	Dynasty Warriors (真三國無雙)	CAO REN (曹仁)

=== Television ===
Year	Title	Role
2013	A Great Way To Care II 仁心解碼II	Franco
2014	Queen Divas 新抱喜相逢	Lian Zhi Cong (連祉聰)
2014	Battles of Tomorrow 再戰明天	Wang Xiao Xuan (王小軒)
2014	Tiger Cubs II 飛虎II	Wen Zhi Jie (文志傑)
2015	Limelight Years 華麗轉身	Tong Wing (唐榮)
2016	A Fist Within Four Walls 城寨英雄	Tuen Chit-keung (段折韁)
2018	OMG, Your Honour 是咁的，法官閣下	Daniel (董丹橋)
2019	Wonder Women 多功能老婆	Jonathan Mui Kwan Ming (梅君明)
2020	Airport Security Unit (ASU)機場特警	(齊天樂)

=== Television hosting ===
Year	Title
2011–present	TVB J2 "Big Boys Club 兄弟幫"
2013	TVB "Midnight Munchies 夜宵磨"
2013	RTHK "Chinese Made Efficient 反斗普通話"
2014	TVB Christmas Special "Anchors With Passport 這個聖誕不太冷"
2015	TVB Christmas Special "Anchors With Passport 2 這個聖誕不怕冷"
2017–2018	Channel V - "V My Guest" 26 episodes (interviewing Cantopop Diva Miriam Yeung, Kelly Chen, Actors Wong Cho Lam and Raymond Lam, etc.)

=== Radio drama ===
- 2012: CR903 - 熱血樂章; Voice: Hynn
- 2013: Metro Radio - Narcotics Campaign Radio Drama (戒不太遲)Voice; Mr. Hui

== Awards and nominations ==
2008

- 2008 Cornell Undergraduate Artist Award

2009

- Best New Artist, TVB 8 Mandarin Music On Demand Awards Presentation; Silver
- New Artist Award, Metro Radio Mandarin Music Awards
- Soaring New Artist, TVB Jade Solid Gold Music Awards Selection Third Round
- New Artist Award (Male Singer-songwriter), Metro Radio Hit Music Awards
- New Male Singer Award, Commercial Radio Ultimate Song Chart Awards Presentation; Silver
- Most Popular New Artist, TVB Jade Solid Gold Music Awards; Silver
- Most Promising New Artist, 32nd Annual RTHK Music Awards; Bronze
- New Artist Award (HK/Taiwan), Sprite Music Awards China

2010

- Best Original Composition & Best Singer-Songwriter, Metro Radio Mandarin Music Awards; "幾米的距離"
- Singer-songwriter award, Metro Radio Hit Music Awards
- Most Popular Singer-songwriter; TVB Jade Solid Gold Music Awards; Silver
- Best New Artist, Global Chinese Music Awards
- Best Singer-songwriter; TVB 8 Mandarin Music On Demand Awards Presentation; Bronze
- Singer-songwriter award, 7th Hit Song Awards

2011

- Best Song Award - TVB Jade Solid Gold Music Awards Selection Second Round - "Toy Story" (玩具也流淚)
- Outstanding Performance, TVB Jade Solid Gold Music Awards, Gold
- Best Performing Artist Award, Metro Radio Hit Music Awards
- Best Original Composition & Best Singer-Songwriter, Metro Radio Mandarin Music Awards; "盛宴"
- Best Improved Artist Award; Music Pioneer Chart

2012

- Most Popular Mandarin Song, TVB Jade Solid Gold Selection Second Round; "Your Song"
- Best Original Composition & Best Performance; Metro Radio Mandarin Music Awards; "兩人三腳"
- Most Improved Artist Award & Best Singer-songwriter Award, Music Pioneer Chart

2013

- Best Original Composition & Most Popular Idol Awards, Metro Radio Mandarin Music Awards; "La La La"
- Best Performing Artist Award, Music Pioneer Chart
- Singer-songwriter & Best Original Composition; Metro Radio Hit Music Awards; Gold; "Double Down 跳火坑"

2014

- Best Song Award, TVB Jade Solid Gold Music Awards Selection Second Road; "千色" (Fighting For)
- Male Singer Award & Hit Song Award, Metro Radio Hit Music Awards; "千色" (Fighting For)
- Most Popular Singer-songwriter, Roadshow Song Chart Awards
- Best Performing Artist Award, Music Pioneer Chart
- Best Dance Song Award, 2014 TVB Jade Solid Gold Awards;Silver;"千色" (Fighting For)

== Concert ==
Year	Date	Title	Genre	Venue	Notes
2012	August 10–11	Jonathan Wong RISING Concert 2012	Solo Concert	Hong Kong Convention and Exhibition Centre	
