= The Great Detective (film) =

- Teaser poster
- Chinese: 大侦探霍桑
- Directed by: Roy Chow
- Screenplay by: Christine To
- Based on: Huo Sang Detective Stories by Cheng Xiaoqing
- Produced by: Christine To; Roy Chow
- Starring: Han Geng; Yin Zheng; Zhang Huiwen
- Cinematography: Ng Man-ching
- Edited by: Cheung Ka-fai
- Music by: Yusuke Hatano
- Production companies: Fujian Hengye Pictures; Fun High Productions; Oneness Pictures; Stabiz; TIK Films
- Distributed by: Lionsgate
- Release date: 25 January 2019 (China)
- Running time: 98 minutes
- Country: China
- Language: Mandarin
- Box office: $1.1 million

The Great Detective is a Chinese fantasy suspense detective film directed by Roy Chow, starring Han Geng, Yin Zheng and Zhang Huiwen, it is based on the Huo Sang Detective Stories by Cheng Xiaoqing. It was released in China on January 25, 2019.

== Cast ==
- Han Geng
- Yin Zheng
- Zhang Huiwen
- Carina Lau
- Guo Xiaodong
- Feng Jiayi
- Law Kar-ying
- Jonathan Wong
- Yu Yang
- Cai Wenjing
- Eliška Křenková

== Production ==
Principal photography took place in Prague, Czech Republic and Shanghai, China. It began filming from 2 June to 8 September 2016, with additional shooting was completed in January 2017.
