= Knockout (2020 film) =

2020 Hong Kong-Chinese film by Roy Chow

- Theatrical release poster
- 我們永不言棄
- Directed by: Roy Chow
- Written by: Christine To; Roy Chow; Wen Xiao; Fafa Zhou
- Produced by: Christine To; Roy Chow
- Starring: Han Geng; Vivian Wu; Elena Askin; Janine Chang; Philip Keung
- Cinematography: Ng Man-ching
- Edited by: Cheung Ka-fai
- Music by: Yusuke Hatano
- Production companies: China Film Media Asia Audio Video Distribution Co., Ltd. Oneness Pictures; XY Creative Company Ltd. Media Asia Films; Media Asia Film Distribution (Beijing) Co., Ltd.
- Distributed by: Beijing Sparkle Image Film Distribution Co., Ltd. Media Asia Films; Beijing United Entertainment Partners Cultures & Media Co., Ltd. iQIYI
- Release dates: 14 May 2020 (Hong Kong); 20 April 2020 (China)
- Running time: 120 minutes
- Countries: Hong Kong; China
- Languages: Mandarin; Japanese

Knockout (Chinese: 我們永不言棄) is a 2020 sports drama film directed, co-produced and co-written by Roy Chow, and starring Han Geng, Vivian Wu, Elena Askin, Janine Chang and Philip Keung. A Hong Kong-Chinese co-production set in Shanghai, the film tells the story about a former boxing champion returns to the boxing ring after his release from prison to fulfill a promise to his daughter.

Principal photography for the film began on 11 November 2018, completed on 16 January 2020, and mainly took place in Wuxi, Shanghai and Tokyo. The film was released in China on 20 April 2020 through iQIYI streaming platform, due to the COVID-19 pandemic, and received mixed-to-negative reviews from critics but has gained a cult following from audiences.

== Plot ==
Zhou Shi has the whole world at his fingertips. He is undefeated in the boxing ring and his wife is about to give birth to their first child. But after an accident in the ring, that leaves his opponent in a coma, an incident of revenge leads to Zhou Shi being jailed for six years for assault.

On release, he returns to Shanghai, hoping to restart his life, but he is given tragic news. His wife has died in an accident, and he is now the sole guardian of Blithe, a daughter he has never met, who was found to have leukemia. He struggles to get his life back on track while bonding with his daughter, when Fang Shengnan, his mother-in-law, unexpectedly enters the frame, threatening to take custody of his daughter. But it gets worse for Zhou Shi, and he needs to find the strength and courage within himself to take on the biggest fight of his life.

== Cast ==
- Han Geng as Zhou Shi
- Vivian Wu as Fang Shengnan
- Elena Askin as Blithe (Zhou Zizai)
  - Janine Chang as adult Blithe
- Philip Keung as Kinson Long
