= Nightfall (2012 film) =

2012 Hong Kong film by Roy Chow

- Film poster
- Traditional Chinese: 大追捕
- Simplified Chinese: 大追捕
- Hanyu Pinyin: Dà Zhuī Bǔ
- Jyutping: Daai6 Zeoi1 Bou6
- Directed by: Roy Chow
- Screenplay by: Christine To
- Story by: Roy Chow
- Produced by: Bill Kong; Ivy Ho
- Starring: Nick Cheung; Simon Yam; Janice Man; Kay Tse
- Cinematography: Ardy Lam; Dick Tung; Julian Cheng
- Edited by: Cheung Ka-fai
- Music by: Umebayashi Shigeru
- Production companies: Sil-Metropole Organisation; Edko Films Ltd. Irresistible Films
- Release date: 15 March 2012
- Running time: 108 minutes
- Country: Hong Kong
- Language: Cantonese
- Box office: HK$17,729,513

Nightfall is a 2012 Hong Kong crime thriller film directed by Roy Chow, starring Nick Cheung, Simon Yam, Janice Man and Kay Tse. The film is about a convicted murderer who, after being released on parole, starts stalking the younger sister of his victim and becomes the suspect after her abusive father is found murdered.

== Plot ==
20 years ago, Wong Yuen-yeung was given a life sentence for murdering Eva, the daughter of a famous musician Han Tsui. Now, after he is released on parole, he starts stalking Zoe, Tsui's younger daughter. Tsui is very abusive and controlling towards Zoe, often beating her in his drunken rage and forbidding her from having any male friends.

George Lam, a police detective, is still deeply affected by his wife's suicide many years ago. He tries to distract himself with his work, but inadvertently ends up neglecting his daughter.

After Tsui is found dead near the beach, Lam and his colleagues investigate the murder and find out about Eva's case, making them believe that Wong might be responsible. A manhunt for Wong ensues after he attacks the police and escapes. In the meantime, the police visit Tsui's house again and discover traces of blood on a patch of ground below the balcony of Zoe's room.

Upon questioning, Tsui's wife finally reveals her family's dark secret. Zoe is actually the illegitimate daughter of Eva and Wong. Tsui had treated Eva in the same way he did to Zoe, and he had killed Eva in anger after discovering her relationship with Wong. Tsui had then framed Wong and called the police to arrest him. Although Wong initially maintained his innocence, he was ultimately tortured by the police into falsely admitting that he murdered Eva. While he was in prison, he attempted suicide but survived and became mute.

Tsui's death turned out to be an accident. He had missed his step and fallen to his death when Zoe pushed him away in self-defence while he was hitting her. Wong had then taken away his dead body and attempted to dispose of it in the sea. When Tsui's body was found, Wong did everything he could to try to draw the police's attention towards himself and make them think that he is the murderer.

In the meantime, the police have tracked down Wong and cornered him on a rooftop, but he commits suicide by jumping off. Later, Lam receives a text sent by Wong before his death: Wong said he envied Lam, who had the chance to watch his daughter grow up, while he could not as he was in prison. Lam breaks down after reading Wong's text as he feels sorry for neglecting his daughter since his wife's death.

Zoe eventually goes to the police station to turn herself in. When she asks Lam about the mysterious man who had been trying to protect her, he shows her Wong's photos and tells her to remember his name.

== Cast ==
- Nick Cheung as Wong Yuen-yeung
  - Shawn Dou as Wong Yuen-yeung (younger)
- Simon Yam as George Lam
- Kay Tse as Ying
- Janice Man as Zoe / Eva
- Michael Wong as Han Tsui
- Candice Yu as Mrs Tsui
- Gordon Liu as Lung
- Felix Lok as Yu
- Yumiko Cheng as Lam's wife
- Cherry Ngan as Lam's daughter
- Ken Lo as prisoner

== Release ==
The film was released in Hong Kong, mainland China, and Australia on 15 March 2012. Well Go USA Entertainment released it on DVD and Blu-ray in North America on 21 May 2013.

== Reception ==
Wong Kwok-siu of Apple Daily wrote: "The shadow cast by the Korean film Oldboy on Nightfall is very obvious. Both of them told stories of pursuing vengeance at all costs. In terms of technical details, this film is very professional, especially with Ardy Lam's cinematography. That was the motivating factor for me to finish watching the entire film."

Patrick Kong of Headline Daily wrote: "Christine To and Roy Chow had met viewers' expectations in terms of how the film concluded, and it was sufficiently convincing. Of course, experienced movie fans would have noticed that certain parts of the film were actually inspired by Galileo and Polanski's Chinatown."

== Awards and nominations ==
Nick Cheung and Cheung Ka-fai were both nominated at the 49th Golden Horse Film Awards for the Best Leading Actor and Best Film Editing awards respectively. Kinson Tsang and Lai Chi-hung won the Best Sound Effect award.
