= Linglong Tire =

Chinese tire manufacturing enterprise

Shandong Linglong Tire Co., Ltd.
- Company type: Public
- Traded as: SSE: 601966
- Industry: Tire manufacturing
- Founded: 1975; 51 years ago
- Headquarters: No.777 Jinlong Road, Zhaoyuan, Yantai, Shandong, China
- Products: Radial tires for passenger cars, light trucks, heavy trucks, and buses
- Number of employees: 13,300
- Website: en.linglong.cn

Shandong Linglong Tire Co., Ltd. (often shortened to Linglong Tire) is a Chinese tire manufacturing enterprise, which has been among the global top 10 tire enterprises and top five in mainland China for many years. In 2024, Linglong ranked 110th in China's 500 Most Valuable Brands by World Brand Lab.

== History ==
The firm's predecessor, Zhaoyuan Tire Manufacturing & Repairing Plant, was established in 1975. However, by the mid-1980s, when the Chinese economy entered the reform and opening up period, the firm found itself in a poor financial situation, with dated equipment and inefficient production techniques. In 1987, the firm was reorganized as Shandong Linglong Tire Co., Ltd. under the leadership of Wang Xicheng. Following its reorganization, Linglong Tire began producing tires for passenger cars, and began producing bias tires. During the 1990s, the firm saw a period of rapid growth, with its annual production value increasing from about 100 million renminbi (RMB) to 1.1 billion from 1991 to 2002. This growth continued throughout the 2000s, with its annual production value reaching 10.6 billion RMB by 2008. Linglong Tire had expanded into Thailand in November 2012 under the name Linglong International Thailand. By 2013, the firm's annual production value had reached 20 billion RMB. Linglong Americas, the American arm of the firm, was established in Ohio in 2009. The firm was listed on the Shanghai Stock Exchange in July 2016.

== Manufacturing plants ==
Linglong Tire has established five manufacturing plants in China in Zhaoyuan, Dezhou, Liuzhou, Jingmen, and Changchun. The company opened its first overseas plant in 2014, a passenger tire factory in Chonburi, Thailand, and added capacity in 2015 for truck/bus tires.

In March, 2019, Linglong launched construction of a second overseas manufacturing base in Zrenjanin, Serbia, which is a new milestone for the company. Planned capacity is 13.6 million tires annually. Plant cost is about $994 million, on 136 hectare in industrial and free trade zone. Production is planned to commence in 2021.

== Sponsorships ==
Beginning in the 2010s, Linglong Tire has sponsored a number of football clubs and leagues. In January 2015, the firm became the top sponsor of German team VfL Wolfsburg. The firm became an official partner of Italian side Juventus in February 2018. On March 30, 2019, Linglong Tire began sponsoring the Serbian SuperLiga, the country's most competitive football league. Since September 2024, the company has also been a sponsor of the main teams of Chelsea F.C. and Real Madrid.

== Controversies ==
In 2009, Linglong Tire attracted controversy when a test carried out by Consumer Reports showed that the tires required an extra 22 feet to stop at a speed of 50 miles per hour (80 km/h) compared to the best tires they tested, scoring the worst out of all tires tested, but has since improved and ranked no.1 among five Chinese tire makers in 2017.

A lawsuit was filed against Linglong Tire in October 2009, when a Florida-based tire firm claimed that Linglong Tire stole some of their proprietary tire designs. A court in Virginia ruled against Linglong Tire on all counts in July 2010, ordering them to pay 26 million United States dollars to the Florida-based firm. Linglong Tire appealed, but the initial decision was upheld in June 2012. An attorney for the Florida-based firm said that following the decision, Linglong Tire failed to pay any of the damages, and in October 2012, the content of Linglong Tire's booth at SEMA, an industry event, was seized as a result.

In November 2021, Vietnamese migrant workers constructing a Linglong Tire factory in Zrenjanin, Serbia alleged that accommodations provided to them by Linglong Tire lacked heating, hot water, and electricity. It was later confirmed that Linglong Tire never hired Vietnamese workers and that they were employed by the contractor Tianjin Electric Power Construction Company (TEPC). Serbian journalists and activists have also accused Linglong Tire of failing to pay the workers, seizing their passports, and removing workers who spoke to the media. Linglong Tire responded by issuing a press release, explaining that TEPC had held the passports to process the workers’ visas and work permits, that the workers had been paid regularly and showing the photos of signed pay slips. The Serbian government, headed by President Aleksandar Vucic, has responded by emphasizing the importance of the 900 million dollar project, claimed that living conditions were "not good but they're improving", and denouncing criticisms from Viola von Cramon, a Member of the European Parliament, as "another attempt to satanize" Serbia. Additionally, pro-government media in Serbia has broadcast interviews in which some of the Vietnamese workers praised their living conditions. The separate investigations of TEPC business and employee practices by the local law enforcement agencies, labor directorate, Embassy of Vietnam and Linglong Tire showed no human rights abuses, withholding of passports or pay. In December 2025, the U.S. Customs and Border Protection blocked imports of Linglong Tire products made in Serbia, citing forced labor concerns.
