= Roy Chow =

Hong Kong filmmaker and lecturer (born 1978)

- 周顯揚
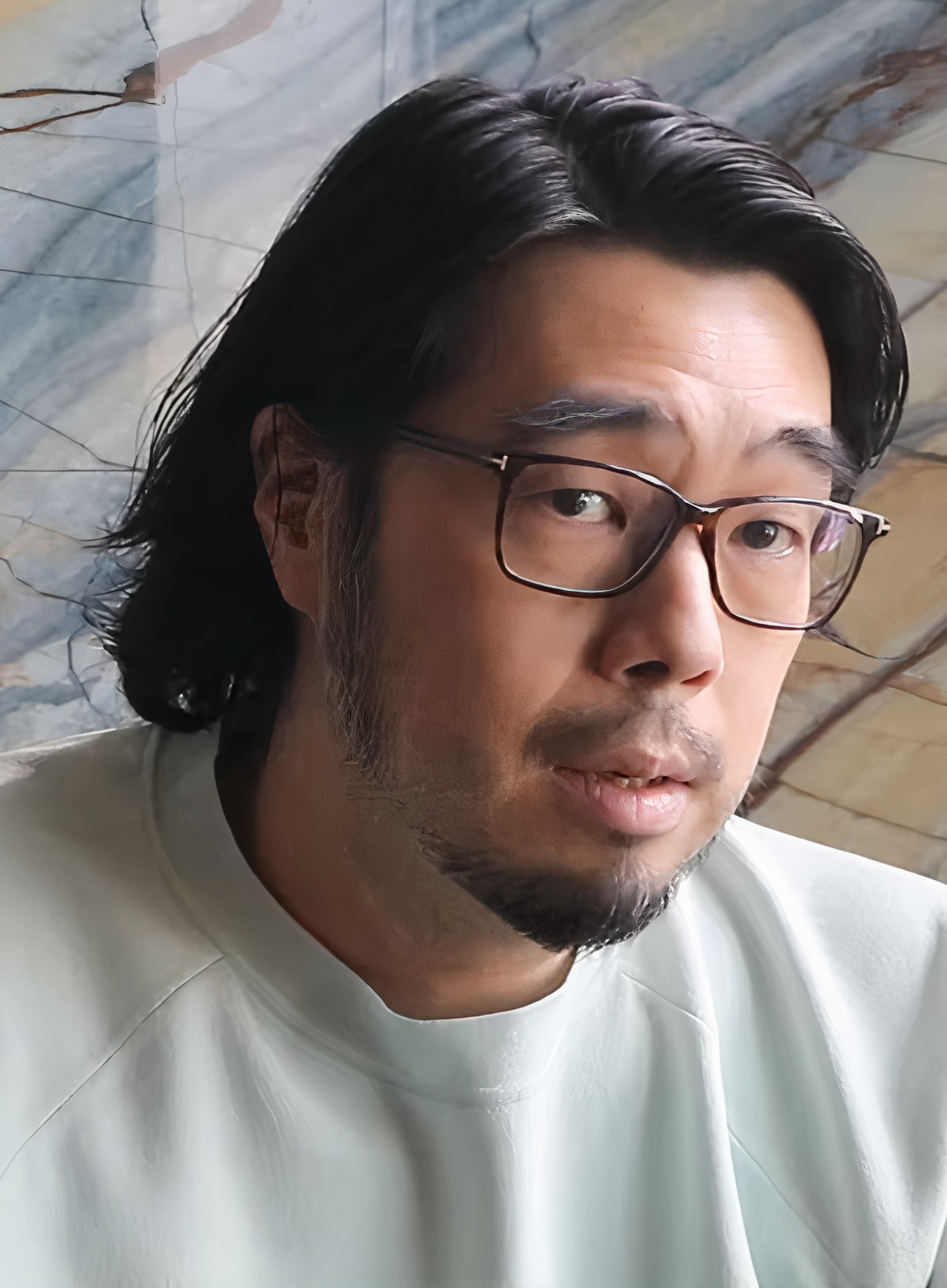
- Chow in 2021
- Born: Chow Hin-yeung; 8 October 1978 (age 47); British Hong Kong
- Education: The University of Hong Kong (PhD); Hong Kong Academy for Performing Arts (BFA)
- Occupations: Film director; Screenwriter; Film producer; Senior lecturer
- Years active: 2001–present
- Employer: The University of Hong Kong (HKU)
- Spouse: Christine To (m. 2014)
- Children: 2
- Awards: Hong Kong Film Awards – Best New Director; 2013 Nightfall

Roy Chow Hin-yeung (Chinese: 周顯揚; born 8 October 1978) is a Hong Kong filmmaker and senior lecturer. Best known for directing films included Murderer (2009), Nightfall (2012), Rise of the Legend (2014), and Dynasty Warriors (2021), he often collaborated with Christine To, who later became his wife.

With his film Nightfall, he won Best New Director category at the 32nd Hong Kong Film Awards in 2013, as well as previously nominated the same category for his film Murderer in 2010. He is currently a faculty member teaching at The University of Hong Kong.

== Personal life ==
Chow married to Christine To, a Hong Kong screenwriter and film producer who had previously collaborated with him in his directed films, in 2014. Together, they have two children.

== Filmography ==
Year	Film	Credit(s)			Note(s)
Year	Film	Director	Screenwriter	Producer	Note(s)
2001	Lai Man-wai: Father of Hong Kong Cinema	No	No	No	Editor; Documentary film
2009	Murderer	Yes	No	No	
2012	Nightfall	Yes	Story	No	
2014	Rise of the Legend	Yes	No	No	
2019	The Great Detective	Yes	No	Yes	
2020	Knockout	Yes	Yes	Yes	
2021	Dynasty Warriors	Yes	No	Yes	Cameo; Cantonese dubbed for the role Liu Bei
