= Quanshan, Gansu =

Quanshan 泉山镇
- Town
- Location relative to Inner Mongolia
- Coordinates: 38°51′37″N 103°18′42″E
- Country: People's Republic of China
- Province: Gansu
- Prefecture-level city: Wuwei
- County: Minle
- Village-level divisions: 1 residential community 12 villages
- Elevation: 1,337 m (4,386 ft)
- Time zone: UTC+8 (China Standard)
- Area code: 0935

Quanshan (Chinese: 泉山; pinyin: Quánshān) is a town of Minle County in a large oasis of the Gobi Desert in east-central Gansu province, China, located 32 kilometres (20 mi) northeast of the county seat. As of 2011, it has one residential community (居委会) and 12 villages under its administration.

== See also ==
- List of township-level divisions of Gansu
