= Murderer (2009 film) =

2009 Hong Kong film by Roy Chow

- Theatrical poster
- Directed by: Roy Chow
- Written by: Christine To
- Produced by: Candy Leung; Cheung Hong-tat
- Starring: Aaron Kwok
- Cinematography: Mark Lee Ping Bin
- Edited by: Cheung Ka-fai
- Music by: Shigeru Umebayashi
- Production company: Sil-Metropole Organisation
- Distributed by: EDKO Film
- Release date: 9 July 2009
- Running time: 120 minutes
- Country: Hong Kong
- Languages: Cantonese; Mandarin

Murderer (simplified Chinese: 杀人犯; traditional Chinese: 殺人犯) is a 2009 Hong Kong thriller film directed by Roy Chow, and starring Aaron Kwok. The film centers on a police detective investigating a series of gruesome murderers. As the case pulls him deeper, he soon realizes that he may be a prime suspect. The film co-stars Janine Chang, Cheung Siu-fai, Josie Ho and Chin Kar-lok, who also served as an action choreographer. Murderer is a co-production between Focus Features and EDKO Film, and was released theatrically in Hong Kong on 9 July 2009.

== Plot ==
Ling (Aaron Kwok) is a married self-assured Police Chief Inspector with an adopted 5-year-old son who is investigating a cold-blooded serial murder case. However, due to the homicide attempt of a fellow inspector named Tai in which Ling emerged unscathed, colleagues are fast becoming aware of Ling's potential involvement. Ling suffered a loss of memory since that incident and cannot recall the events leading to Tai's attempted murder.

As Ling sifts through the clues, he finds that all the evidence is pointing toward himself as the murderer. However, Ling's belief and unwavering sense of innocence fuels him to maintain his suspicion and keeps digging. Nevertheless, his colleagues do not believe him and he accidentally kills his partner in an argument.

Ling takes a temporary leave of absence and enforces a lockdown mode to safeguard his family. During the lockdown the central plot twist of the movie is unveiled, as Ling's adopted son confesses his real identity to him. He is, in fact, Ling's half-brother, born by Ling's father's mistress who was abandoned by the father. Driven by a life of pain, humiliation and suffering for him and his mother he vowed revenge and painstakingly made his way back into Ling's life as his adopted son. He was able to accomplish this because of a medical condition where his physical stature remains that of a 5 year old. He also reveals that he was the beggar boy Ling beat up many years ago. Having shared a bed with Ling's wife and paid close attention to Ling's friends he is able to slowly fulfill his revenge and give out orders for the murders which was carried out by his accomplice, a mentally handicapped man he befriended years ago at a disability center.

Ling's wife is murdered in their home, driving Ling insane. Ling is able to gather himself to kill the accomplice and is moments away from carrying out justice on his adopted son until the police arrive and shoot him. The end of the movie shows Ling's boss discovering that the adopted son is in the picture containing Ling's childhood friends and begins to suspect something whilst Ling is in a mental hospital engraving the words "Revenge upon release" on his left arm. Meanwhile, his adopted son is depicted on the beach as a maturely dressed child contemplating the future.

== Production ==
Murderer is a co-production between Focus Features, EDKO Film, and Sil-Metropole Organisation. The film marks the directorial debut of Roy Chow, and features action choreography by Chin Kar-lok.

During production, Aaron Kwok went without sleep for his role. On set, he became known as "Iron Man Kwok." Kwok in order to convey the most disturbed emotions, did not say much for nearly a day. He would often sit in a corner without saying a word and looked very vicious. crew members warned each other not to go near Kwok. When production for the film ended, Kwok did not sleep for three days, despite feeling completely exhausted.

Cheung Siu-fai, who co-stars in the film, had to overcome his fear of heights for film, as he had to jump down a five-story platform to a ground full of sharp rocks. After Chin Ka-Lok demonstrated that stunt to him, Cheung agreed to perform it himself. In order to break his fall, Cheung used his arms to block the edges of sharp rocks from hitting his head. Despite being shaken after performing the stunt, Cheung described his fall as intense and exciting: "Although I am afraid of heights I feel this scene is very refreshing and challenging."

== Release ==
Murderer was released in Hong Kong on 9 July 2009. The film was also released in Singapore on 23 July 2009.

=== Marketing ===
The film's movie poster depicts its lead actor, Aaron Kwok, with a vicious look on his face. This photo on the movie poster was taken by famed photographer Wing Shya, who aimed to capture Kwok's exhausted look and almost madly vicious eyes. Kwok himself was impressed with the poster, feeling that it was fully terrifying. When he first saw the poster he almost was not able to recognize himself. MTR, which runs Hong Kong's subway system, nearly banned the poster from all subway stations, feeling that the image was terrifying.

Focus Features spent $1 million to have the theatrical trailer designed by the same English editing company that designed the trailer for Slumdog Millionaire.

== Awards and nominations ==
29th Hong Kong Film Awards

- Nominated: Best Actor (Aaron Kwok)
- Nominated: Best New Director (Roy Chow Hin Yeung)

== See also ==
- Aaron Kwok filmography
- Orphan (2009 film)
