= Dynasty Warriors (film) =

2021 Hong Kong film by Roy Chow

- Film poster

Chinese name
- Traditional Chinese: 真·三國無雙
- Simplified Chinese: 真·三国无双
Transcriptions
Standard Mandarin
- Hanyu Pinyin: Zhēn Sān Guó Wú Shuāng
Yue: Cantonese
- Jyutping: Zan1 Saam1 Gwok3 Mou4 Seong1
- Directed by: Roy Chow
- Screenplay by: Christine To; Wen Xiao; Li Rui
- Based on: Dynasty Warriors by: Koei Tecmo; Omega Force
- Produced by: Roy Chow; Christine To; Alex Dong
- Starring: Louis Koo; Carina Lau; Wang Kai; Tony Yang; Han Geng; Justin Cheung; Gulnazar; Ray Lui
- Cinematography: Kenny Tse
- Edited by: Cheung Ka-fai
- Music by: Yusuke Hatano
- Production companies: HMV Digital China; Sun Entertainment Culture; Guangdong Sublime Media; Beijing Lajin Film; Khorgas New Splendid Entertainment; Er Dong Pictures (Beijing) Company; Beijing New Splendid Entertainment; China Star Movie Limited; Deshe Film; Film Entertainment Power; Oneness Pictures
- Distributed by: Newport Entertainment
- Release dates: 29 April 2021 (Hong Kong); 30 April 2021 (China)
- Running time: 118 minutes
- Countries: Hong Kong; China
- Languages: Cantonese; Mandarin
- Budget: HK$300 million
- Box office: US$3.31 million (Note: See Box office)

Dynasty Warriors is a 2021 fantasy-action film based on the Japanese video game franchise of the same title by Omega Force and Koei Tecmo. Directed by Roy Chow, the film stars an ensemble cast from Hong Kong, China and Taiwan, including Louis Koo, Carina Lau, Wang Kai, Tony Yang, Han Geng, Justin Cheung, Gulnazar and Ray Lui. The film was released on 29 April 2021 in Hong Kong, and in China on 30 April 2021.

== Plot ==
The film is set in Imperial China in the 2nd century; specifically towards the end of the Han dynasty. Following the chaos of the Yellow Turban Rebellion, the central government has fallen under the control of the vicious, ambitious warlord Dong Zhuo. Under Yuan Shao's leadership, other warlords from throughout China form a coalition to remove Dong Zhuo from power. Some of the more prominent coalition figures include Cao Cao and Sun Jian, as well as virtuous Liu Bei and his sworn brothers Guan Yu and Zhang Fei. The film ends with the Battle of Hulao Pass, where the coalition find themselves up against Dong Zhuo's forces led by his foster son Lü Bu.

== Cast ==
- Louis Koo as Lü Bu
- Carina Lau as the Master of the Sword Forge Castle
- Wang Kai as Cao Cao
- Tony Yang as Liu Bei
- Han Geng as Guan Yu
- Justin Cheung as Zhang Fei
- Gülnezer Bextiyar as Diaochan
- Ray Lui as Yuan Shao
- Lam Suet as Dong Zhuo
- Philip Keung as Zhang Jiao
- Law Kar-ying as Lü Boshe
- Eddie Cheung as Chen Gong
- Jonathan Wong as Cao Ren
- Yuan Wenkang as Sun Jian
- Jin Song as Hua Xiong
- Wang Xin as Sun Ce
- Lu Zhanxiang as Sun Quan
- Paul Chun as Wang Yun

== Production ==
On 15 March 2016, Suzuki Akihiro, the producer of Koei Tecmo's Dynasty Warriors video game series, and the Hong Kong-based company HMV Digital China announced at the 20th Hong Kong International Film and TV Market that they will be making a live-action film adaptation of Dynasty Warriors. The film will be directed by Roy Chow, produced and written by Christine To, and to be released in 2017.

On 8 July 2017, HMV Digital China's executive chairman Stephen Shiu Jr. revealed on his weibo that the film will start shooting on 11 July. He also revealed that he had approached Koei Tecmo four years ago and secured the rights to adapt the Dynasty Warriors franchise into a movie. On 11 July, Shiu announced that Han Geng, Wang Kai, Louis Koo, Tony Yang and Gulnazar are part of the main cast.

On 28 September 2017, director Roy Chow announced that after 63 days of filming in mainland China, the team will be moving to New Zealand in November 2017 to shoot the background scenes. While shooting in mainland China, Louis Koo sustained an eye injury but he insisted on staying until the end. However, Roy Chow refused to let him stay and sent him back to Hong Kong for medical treatment. As soon as he recovered, Koo rushed to New Zealand to join the rest of the team. Chow later said that he was very impressed with Koo's commitment and professionalism.

Shooting for Dynasty Warriors wrapped up on 28 November 2017. The pre-production phase took eight months, the principal photography phase lasted five months, and the post-production phase will take up to a year.

== Release ==
A teaser trailer for Dynasty Warriors was released on 19 March 2018, along with an announcement that the film was scheduled to be shown in 2019.

In March 2021, another trailer was released indicating a release on 29 April 2021 in Hong Kong, and in China on 30 April 2021.

Netflix purchased the film's global distribution rights with a record breaking eight-figure price for a Chinese-language film and was released for streaming on 1 July 2021.

== Reception ==
=== Box office ===
As of 23 May 2021, Dynasty Warriors has grossed a total of US$3.31 million worldwide, combining its box office from Hong Kong (US$830,000), China (US$2.4 million) and Taiwan (US$80,000).

In Hong Kong, the film debuted at No. 1 on its opening weekend, grossing HK$2,945,449 (US$380,329) during its first four days of release. The film remained at No. 1 on its second weekend, grossing HK$2,224,136, and have grossed a total of HK$5,178,490 (US$670,000) by then. In its third weekend, the film grossed HK$970,601, coming in at No. 3, and have grossed a total of HK$6,149,091 (US$791,623) by then. On its fourth week, the film grossed HK$294,781, coming in at No. 6, and have grossed a total of HK$6,443,872 (US$830,000) so far.

In China, the film debuted at No. 9, grossing CNY¥9.29 million (US$1.44 million) after its first three days of release.

In Taiwan, the film debuted at No. 13 grossed NT$1.48 million (US$50,000) after its first three days of release. During its second weekend, the film grossed NT$810,000, coming in at No. 23, and have grossed a total of NT$2.33 million (US$80,000) by then. On its third weekend, the film grossed NT$90,000, coming in at No. 30, and have grossed a total of NT$2.42 million (US$80,000) so far.

=== Critical reception ===
Edmund Lee of the South China Morning Post gave the film a score of 2.5/5 stars, criticizing the film's humor and casting choices, but complimented its focus on story over action.

Writing for Polygon, Todd Harper believed the film struggled between its adaptation of Romance of the Three Kingdoms and Dynasty Warriors; he felt it was inconsistent in its interpretation of the plot, sometimes presented as a historical period drama and sometimes a wuxia, creating a "deep frustration at how scattershot the film is". However, he praised the action sequences and choice of music.

Robert Daniels of IGN scored the film 2 out of 10, noting a lack of character development, a bloated story that is incomprehensible to those unfamiliar with the games or the original source material, and poor direction and visual effects.
