= Cheng Xiaoqing =

Chinese writer and translator

- Born: 2 June 1893; Shanghai, China
- Died: 12 October 1976 (aged 83); Suzhou, Jiangsu, China
- Occupation: Writer
- Writing career
- Genre: Detective Fiction
- Notable work: Sherlock in Shanghai

Cheng Xiaoqing
- Simplified Chinese: 程小青
Transcriptions
Standard Mandarin
- Hanyu Pinyin: Chéng XiǎoQīng
- Wade–Giles: Cheng Xiaoqing

Cheng Xiaoqing (2 June 1893 – 12 October 1976) was a Chinese detective fiction writer and foreign detective fiction translator. He is known for his Huo Sang series, in which the main character, Huo Sang, is considered to be "the Eastern Sherlock Holmes".

== Early life ==
Cheng Xiaoqing was born in a poverty-stricken family in Shanghai, China, on August 2, 1893. Cheng was the eldest son and had two siblings, a younger brother and sister. Cheng's father initially worked in a textile store, which later closed. This forced him to sell newspapers to feed his family. He died in 1903 under great pressure when Cheng was ten years old. Cheng's mother was a seamstress and also worked hard to ensure her son was able to go to school. However, severe economic conditions forced Cheng to quit school when he was 15 to help his mother raising his younger sister.

Cheng moved to Suzhou with his family and his new bride in 1915 as he accepted a teaching position to teach Wu (the Shanghainese dialect). There, Cheng became acquainted with another foreign language teacher, who taught Cheng English.

== Early career ==
At the age of sixteen, Cheng became an apprentice in a watchmaker shop called Hope Brothers and Company in Shanghai, where he borrowed influential books and being taught horror and romance fictions in writing from a colleague. Aside from long working hours, Cheng spent a lot of time reading Chinese classics, writing short stories and buying old books during his time in the watchmaker shop, which has crucially influenced his later literary career according to a biographer he was closed to. Cheng took night classes to learn English, which allowed him to read foreign novels by writers like Henri René Albert Guy de Maupassant and Alexandre Dumas fils. Later, he came across Arthur Conan Doyle's The Adventures of Sherlock Holmes in the Shi Wu Bao Newspaper, which inspired him to write detective stories of his own. Cheng Xiaoqing published his first detective story titled "The Shadow in the Lamplight" in The Merry Magazine in 1914. He later entered this piece in a Shanghai newspaper contest and won.

Some of the stories have since been collected into English under the title "Sherlock in Shanghai".

== Later life ==
In 1946, Cheng became the editor of detective magazine The New Detective, but because of the lack of story sources, the magazine then shut down. After the publication was stopped, Cheng became a teacher working in The No.1 Middle School in Suzhou, Jiangsu Province.

Ten years later, Cheng began to write adventure fiction; for example, one of the most famous movies in 1958 called "The Case of Xu Qiuying" was created based on Cheng's fiction. However, during the period of Cultural Revolution, Cheng was criticized and denounced by the public, thus he had to stop writing.

He died of stomach illness in 1976 when he was 83 years old.

== Works and accomplishments ==
=== Literatures ===
Cheng Xiaoqing is known as the "Grand Master of China's Detective Fiction" as well as the "Conan Doyle in Eastern World." His first story "The Shadow in the Lamplight" (灯光人影) was published by Shanghai Newspaper when he was twenty-one years old and it was well received by its readership. Later, he started to publish more famous detective stories such as "Cat's Eye"; "The Shoe"; "The Other Paragraph"; "The Odd Tenant"; "The Examination Paper" and "On the Huangpu", which were all collected in the Huo Sang Series. Other detective works like "One Summer Night"; "At the Ball" and "The Ghost in the Villa" were published in different magazines. In addition, Cheng Xiaoqing also wrote detective novels such as The South-China Swallow (Jiang Nanyan) and Blood Fingerprint.

=== Movies ===
Cheng Xiaoqing's literary creation was famous in the 1920s, but main movie activities began in the 1930s. In 1926, his novel "The Heart of the Mother" was edited by Chen Zhiqing into a screenplay, which is his works' first entry into the movie. Then in 1931, Cheng Xiaoqing officially started writing scripts for major movie companies. It is clearly to be seen from the adaptation, Cheng Xiaoqing does not completely rewrite the novels; rather, he redesigned the plots based on film features and audience psychology in order to attract more viewers.

A film based on the Huo Sang stories was released in 2019, entitled The Great Detective, and starring Han Geng as Huo.

== Sources ==
- Luo Xueyan. "程小青侦探小说创作心理初探". Shaanxi Normal University, 2010.
- Jiang Weifeng. 近现代侦探小说作家程小青研究. China Social Science Press. 2007.
- Jiang Weifeng. "On Cheng Xiaoqing' s Detective Story". Journal of Shandong Administrative College and Shandong Economic Management Personnel College (in Chinese). 2004(03):149-151.
