= Sun Baoguo =

Sun Baoguo 孙宝国
- Born: February 28, 1961 (age 65); Zhaoyuan, China
- Citizenship: China
- Education: Beijing Institute of Light Industry; Tsinghua University
- Scientific career
- Fields: Food science
- Workplaces: Beijing Technology and Business University
- Doctoral advisor: Yuan Naiju, Ding Fuxin

Sun Baoguo (simplified Chinese: 孙宝国; traditional Chinese: 孫寶國; pinyin: Sūn Bǎoguó, born February 28, 1961) is an academician of the Chinese Academy of Engineering (CAE), professor of food science and chemical engineering in Beijing Technology and Business University.

In China, Professor Sun is an expert in the research of spices and the only CAS/CAE academician for food science.
