= Christine To =

Hong Kong screenwriter and film producer (born 1980)

- 杜緻朗
- Born: To Chi-long; 30 September 1980 (age 45); British Hong Kong
- Education: University of Technology Sydney; City University of Hong Kong; Chinese University of Hong Kong
- Occupations: Screenwriter; film producer
- Years active: 2004–present
- Spouse: Roy Chow (m. 2014)
- Children: 2

Christine To Chi-long (Chinese: 杜緻朗; born 30 September 1980) is a Hong Kong film producer and screenwriter. She is best known for collaborating with her husband, Roy Chow, to write and produce several films such as Nightfall, Rise of the Legend and Dynasty Warriors.

== Filmography ==
Year	Film	Credit(s)	
Year	Film	Screenwriter	Producer
2004	Triad Underworld	Yes	No
2006	Fearless	Yes	No
2007	Secret	Yes	No
2009	Murderer	Yes	No
2010	True Legend	Yes	No
2012	Nightfall	Yes	No
2014	Rise of the Legend	Yes	No
2019	The Great Detective	Yes	Yes
2020	Knockout	Yes	Yes
2021	Dynasty Warriors	Yes	Yes
