= Rise of the Legend =

2014 Hong Kong-Chinese film by Roy Chow

- Theatrical poster
- Directed by: Roy Chow
- Screenplay by: Christine To
- Produced by: William Kong; Sammo Hung; Ivy Ho; Liu Erdong
- Starring: Sammo Hung; Eddie Peng; Wang Luodan; Jing Boran; Max Zhang; Wong Cho-lam; Tony Leung Ka-fai; Angelababy
- Cinematography: Ng Man-ching
- Edited by: Cheung Ka-fai; Tang Man-to
- Music by: Shigeru Umebayashi
- Production companies: Edko Films; Irresistible Films; Universal Pictures International; VFX Nova Digital Productions; BDI Films
- Distributed by: Edko Films (Hong Kong); China Film Group (China); Universal Pictures (Worldwide)
- Release dates: 21 November 2014 (China); 27 November 2014 (Hong Kong)
- Running time: 131 minutes
- Countries: Hong Kong; China
- Languages: Cantonese; Mandarin
- Box office: US$29.76 million

Rise of the Legend (Chinese: 黃飛鴻之英雄有夢) is a 2014 kung-fu action film directed by Roy Chow and written by Christine To. A Hong Kong-Chinese co-production, the film stars Sammo Hung, Eddie Peng, Wang Luodan, Jing Boran, Max Zhang, Wong Cho Lam, Tony Leung and Angelababy. It was released on 21 November 2014 in China.

Principal photography on the film began on 20 August 2013 in China and concluded in December 2013. Edko Films, Irresistible Films, and Universal Pictures International produced the film. Edko Films released the film in China and Universal distributed the film Internationally. The action director is Corey Yuen.

== Plot ==
Wong Fei-Hung is a 21 year old man who is determined to become a master of martial arts. In 1868 during the late Qing Dynasty, in Guangzhou, two crime factions run the Huangpu Port: The Black Tiger and the Northern Sea. For years, the Black Tiger's fearsome boss Lei Gong has been trying to get rid of the leader of the Northern Sea. One of his latest recruits is Wong Fei-Hung, a fearless fighter who takes the Northern Sea leader's head after a fierce fight. Recognizing Fei-Hung's talent, Lei Gong makes the young warrior his godson and one of his Four Tigers, the most trusted men in the gang. There is more to young Fei than meets the eye and the truth about his past and the ultimate showdown soon unravels.

== Cast ==
- Sammo Hung as Master Lui, leader of the Black Tiger gang, Main Villain.
- Eddie Peng as Wong Fei-Hung, a future revered folk hero, joined the Black Tiger gang to take it down within by climbing into the top four tiger rank with the help from his friends from the outside.
- Jing Boran as Fiery, Wong Fei-Hung' childhood friend and admirer of Chun. He helps Wong Fei-Hung take down the Black Tiger gang from the outside. He died sacrificed himself to keep Fei-Hung from getting his identity as a mole in the Black Tiger Gang from exposed.
- Wang Luodan as Chun, Wong Fei-Hung's childhood friend and lover.
- Angelababy as Xiao Hua, a courtesan, revealed to be the long-lost childhood friend of Wong Fei-Hung, died near in the end of the film in helping Fei-Hung in her own way.
- Zhang Jin as Wu Long, the son of the North evil who try to avenge his late father's death caused by the Black Tiger Gang. He was killed by Master Lui while Fei-Hung tries to spare his life.
- Wong Cho-lam as Big Tooth, Good friend of Wong Fei-Hung, a former member of the Black Tiger gang who joins Fei-Hung on his mission to take down the Black Tiger Gang.
- Qin Junjie as Foon, ally, and supporter of Wong Fei-Hung, Chun, and Fiery against the Black Tiger gang
- Chen Zhihui as North Sea Gang Leader, Leader of the Northern Sea. Rival of Master Lui. Killed by Wong Fei-Hung in the beginning of the film to raise his rank in the Black Tiger Gang.
- Byron Mann as Black Crow, One of four tigers of the Black Tiger Gang. Killed by Wong Fei-Hung and Chun for his key to bank vault of the Black Tiger Gang
- Gao Taiyu as Wing
- Tony Leung Ka-fai as Wong Kei-ying, Wong Fei-Hung's father (guest star), A martial artist and physician who help those in need. He died in a fire by a villain when saving his disciples

== Production ==
In August 2013, it was announced that Edko Films, Irresistible Delta and BDI Films were teaming up for an upcoming action film based on life stories of the legendary martial arts master Wong Fei-Hung. The producers would be William Kong, Liu Erdong and Ivy Ho, while director Roy Chow would be directing on the script by Christine To. On 12 June 2014 it was announced that Universal Pictures International acquired all international rights to the film, including North America, and Edko Films would distribute the film in Asia. It was also announced that the film was in post-production, which Universal would be co-producing along with Edko Films and Irresistible Films.

Principal photography began on 20 August 2013 in China and wrapped up in mid-December of the same year.
