= Milk Coffee =

Chinese musical group

Milk Coffee 牛奶@咖啡
- Also known as: Milk@Coffee
- Origin: Beijing, China
- Genres: Mandopop
- Years active: 2004–present
- Members: Fu Yan; Ge Fei

Milk Coffee (Chinese: 牛奶咖啡; pinyin: Niúnǎi Kāfēi) is a Chinese pop-music group consisting of Kiki (singer/lyricist), and Ge Fei (Keyboard/guitar/arranger and producer).

== History ==
KiKi was in high school when met Gefei through QQ. They chatted about music. After entering the university, KiKi and Gefei built a band with two other classmates and participated in the Campus Band Competition, however resulting in a loss. The band was forced to disband due to their graduation. Both previous students built the band "Milk@Coffee". According to them, the purpose of their music was just a way of life.

KiKi said, “In 2004, I met a stranger in Gefei's home, she asked me if I want to be an artisan. I couldn't believe at that time. The stranger, is our broker. She listened to our music, through friends' introduction. " Milk@Coffee joined Modern Sky Company, and debut by the album "Burn! Little Universe". In 2008 and in 2009, they released album "Youth is blue" and "Got used to the loneliness". "Got used to the loneliness" was released with the book "Loneliness leads us to grow up", which is written by Kiki.

In 2009, they changed Milk@Coffee into Milk Coffee. They left Modern Sky Company and joined Huayi Bros. Media Group. The new albums, "Give You Some Color" "Lost & Found~To find it" and "You can not love me" make them more famous in China.

== Members ==
Kiki

- Original Name: Fu Yan富妍
- Lead singer / lyricist
- Birth: April 8, 1982
- Birthplace: Beijing
- Alma mater: Beijing Technology and Business University

Gefei

- Original Name: 周格非
- Keyboard / Production
- Birthday: March 23, 1982
- Birthplace: Beijing
- Alma mater: Beijing Technology and Business University

== Discography ==
=== Albums ===
- Burn! Little Universe (燃烧吧！小宇宙), 2005
- Youth is blue (越长大越孤单), 2008
- Got used to the loneliness (习惯了寂寞), 2009
- Give You Some Color (给你点儿颜色), September 2010
- Lost & Found~To find it (Lost & Found 去寻找), September 2011
- You can not love me (你不能爱我), September 2012

=== Singles ===
- Next World (For cartoon《星游记》(Rainbow Sea))June.12th 2012
- Believe Youth(信仰年轻) May 24, 2013
- Forgot to Hold Hand (忘了牵手) 2015
- 小城爱情故事 2023

== Comment ==
Their music is just like milk coffee, fresh and mellow. Unlike others, Ge Fei (Keyboard / guitar / arranger and producer) has perfect skills in playing the piano and the guitar, makes their music classical and romantic. Kiki, the lead singer & lyricist, has sweet voice. Also, the lyrics she writes are very lovely.
