= Quanshan Subdistrict, Zhaoyuan, Shandong =

Quanshan Subdistrict 泉山街道
- Subdistrict
- Location in Shandong
- Coordinates: 37°21′12″N 120°24′28″E
- Country: People's Republic of China
- Province: Shandong
- Prefecture-level city: Yantai
- County-level city: Zhaoyuan
- Elevation: 66 m (217 ft)
- Time zone: UTC+8 (China Standard)
- Postal code: 265400
- Area code: 0535

Quanshan Subdistrict (Chinese: 泉山街道; pinyin: Quánshān Jiēdào; lit. 'fountain mountain') is a subdistrict of the city of Zhaoyuan, Shandong, China, covering part of the southern portion of the urban core. As of 2011, it has 13 residential communities (社区) and 10 villages under its administration.

== See also ==
- List of township-level divisions of Shandong
