= Quanshan Subdistrict, Ulanqab =

Quanshan Subdistrict 泉山街道
- Subdistrict
- Location in Inner Mongolia
- Coordinates: 41°00′58″N 113°06′57″E
- Country: People's Republic of China
- Region: Inner Mongolia
- Prefecture-level city: Ulanqab
- District: Jining
- Elevation: 1,450 m (4,760 ft)
- Time zone: UTC+8 (China Standard)
- Postal code: 012000
- Area code: 0474

Quanshan Subdistrict (Chinese: 泉山街道; pinyin: Quánshān Jiēdào; lit. 'fountain mountain') is a subdistrict of Jining District in the urban core of Ulanqab, Inner Mongolia, People's Republic of China. As of 2011, it has 8 residential communities (社区) under its administration.

== See also ==
- List of township-level divisions of Inner Mongolia
