= Minle County =

Minle County 民乐县
- County
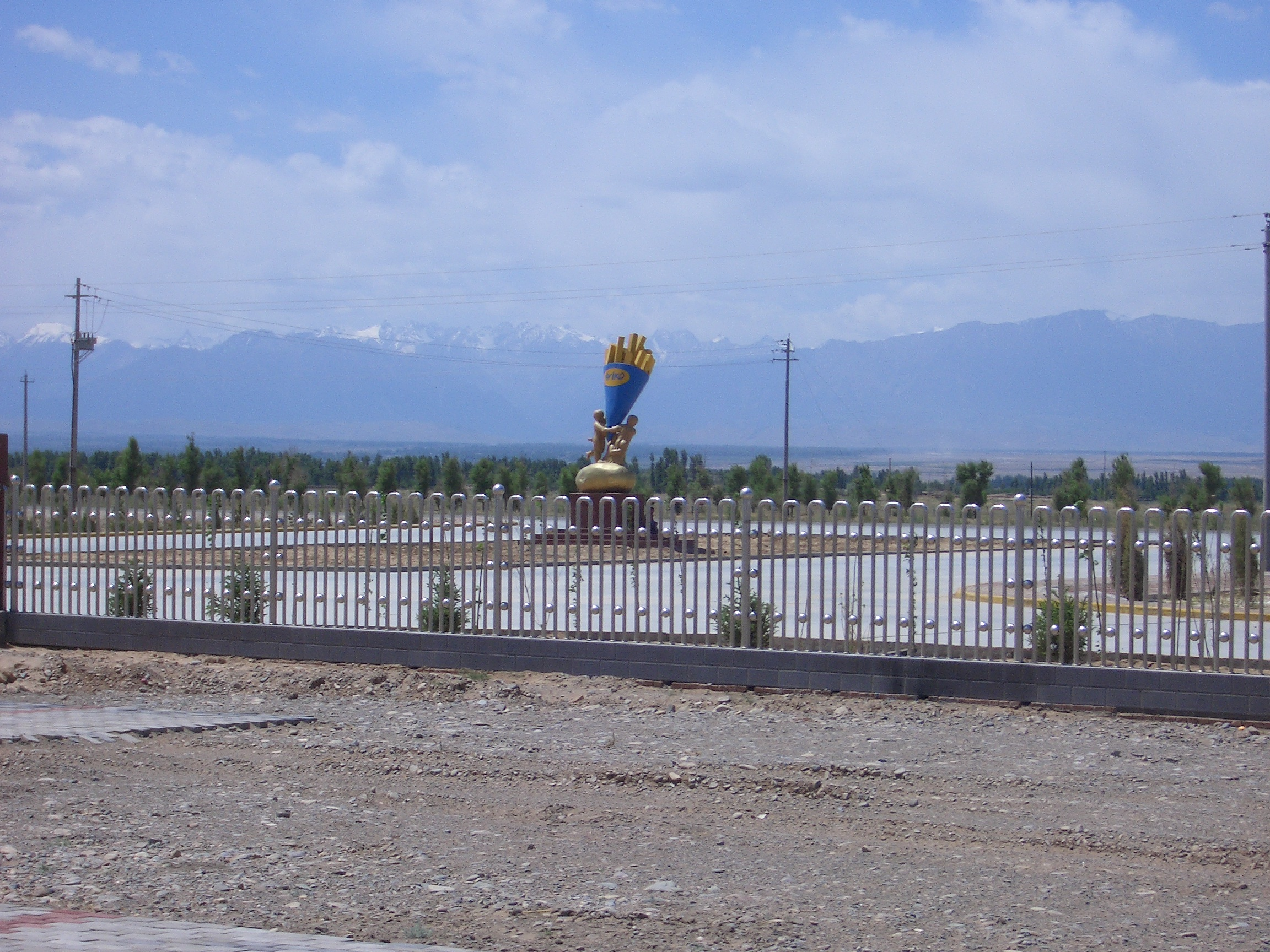
- On the grounds of the Aviko French fry factory in Liuba Town, Minle County

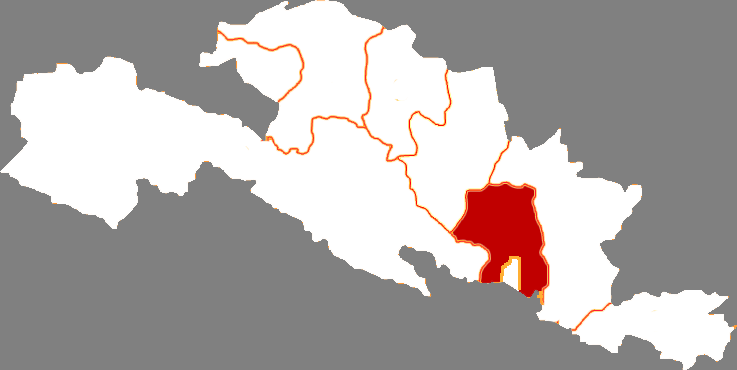
- Minle in Zhangye

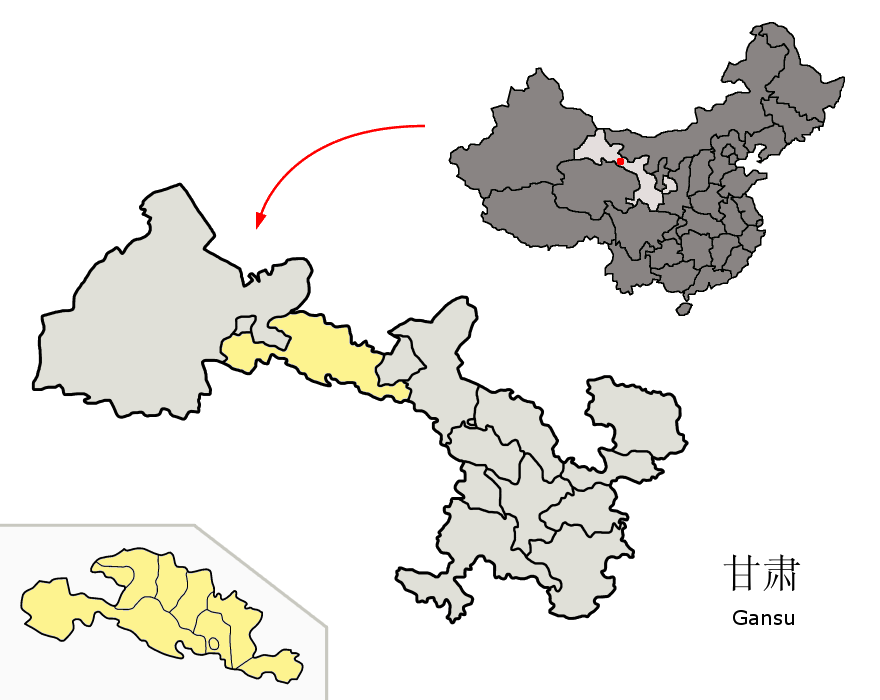
- Zhangye in Gansu
- Coordinates (Minle government): 38°25′49″N 100°48′45″E
- Country: China
- Province: Gansu
- Prefecture-level city: Zhangye
- County seat: Hongshui

Area
  - Total: 3,678 km^{2} (1,420 sq mi)

Population (2018)
  - Total: 248,570
  - Density: 67.58/km^{2} (175.0/sq mi)
- Time zone: UTC+8 (China Standard)
- Postal code: 734500

Minle County (simplified Chinese: 民乐县; traditional Chinese: 民樂縣; pinyin: Mínlè Xiàn) is a county in Gansu province of China, bordering Qinghai province to the south. It is under the administration of the prefecture-level city of Zhangye. Its postal code is 734500, and in 1999 its population was 232,462 people. The GDP per capita is US$1,605 in 2010.

In 2006, a 62-year-old villager unsatisfied with the results of a divorce settlement entered and detonated the Minle courthouse with explosives, leaving five people dead and 22 injured, including government officials.

== Administrative divisions ==
Minle County is divided to 10 towns:

Towns

- Hongshui (洪水镇)
- Liuba (六坝镇)
- Xintian (新天镇)
- Nangu (南古镇)
- Yonggu (永固镇)
- Sanbao (三堡镇)
- Nanfeng (南丰镇)
- Minlian (民联镇)
- Shunhua (顺化镇)
- Fengle (丰乐镇)

== Climate ==
Climate data for Minle, elevation 2,232 m (7,323 ft), (1991–2020 normals, extremes 1981–2010)
Month	Jan	Feb	Mar	Apr	May	Jun	Jul	Aug	Sep	Oct	Nov	Dec	Year
Record high °C (°F)	13.7 (56.7)	16.5 (61.7)	21.0 (69.8)	28.2 (82.8)	28.8 (83.8)	30.5 (86.9)	35.0 (95.0)	31.7 (89.1)	31.5 (88.7)	24.7 (76.5)	19.5 (67.1)	15.5 (59.9)	35.0 (95.0)
Mean daily maximum °C (°F)	−2.3 (27.9)	0.8 (33.4)	6.2 (43.2)	12.8 (55.0)	17.7 (63.9)	21.7 (71.1)	23.7 (74.7)	22.6 (72.7)	17.8 (64.0)	11.4 (52.5)	5.0 (41.0)	−0.3 (31.5)	11.4 (52.6)
Daily mean °C (°F)	−9.8 (14.4)	−6.4 (20.5)	−0.6 (30.9)	6.2 (43.2)	11.4 (52.5)	15.8 (60.4)	17.4 (63.3)	16.0 (60.8)	11.4 (52.5)	4.6 (40.3)	−2.4 (27.7)	−8.1 (17.4)	4.6 (40.3)
Mean daily minimum °C (°F)	−14.8 (5.4)	−11.4 (11.5)	−5.6 (21.9)	0.6 (33.1)	5.4 (41.7)	9.9 (49.8)	11.8 (53.2)	10.6 (51.1)	6.6 (43.9)	0.1 (32.2)	−6.9 (19.6)	−13.0 (8.6)	−0.6 (31.0)
Record low °C (°F)	−25.9 (−14.6)	−24.4 (−11.9)	−22.1 (−7.8)	−14.1 (6.6)	−10.4 (13.3)	−0.2 (31.6)	4.0 (39.2)	0.6 (33.1)	−4.4 (24.1)	−18.8 (−1.8)	−22.7 (−8.9)	−29.1 (−20.4)	−29.1 (−20.4)
Average precipitation mm (inches)	3.8 (0.15)	4.6 (0.18)	11.6 (0.46)	22.3 (0.88)	43.2 (1.70)	53.6 (2.11)	72.9 (2.87)	66.4 (2.61)	57.6 (2.27)	17.3 (0.68)	7.1 (0.28)	4.7 (0.19)	365.1 (14.38)
Average precipitation days (≥ 0.1 mm)	4.7	4.9	5.8	6.4	8.5	10.5	13.1	12.2	10.1	5.9	4.2	5.1	91.4
Average snowy days	6.9	7.0	7.7	6.6	2.5	0.1	0	0	0.4	4.5	5.4	7.0	48.1
Average relative humidity (%)	48	45	45	43	45	51	60	61	60	54	50	50	51
Mean monthly sunshine hours	230.1	219.8	250.8	260.9	271.7	261.9	259.1	242.4	226.9	246.8	236.7	226.9	2,934
Percentage possible sunshine	75	71	67	65	61	59	58	58	62	72	79	77	67
Source: China Meteorological Administration

== Transport ==
- China National Highway 227
- Minle railway station on the Lanzhou–Xinjiang High-Speed Railway

== See also ==
- List of administrative divisions of Gansu
