= Beijing Technology and Business University =

Municipal public university in Beijing, China

- 北京工商大学
- Former names: Beijing Light Industry School (Beijing Institute of Light Industry) and Beijing Business School
- Type: National
- Established: 1950; 76 years ago (As Beijing Business School)
- President: Sun Baoguo (孙宝国)
- Faculty: 837
- Undergraduates: 12,000
- Postgraduates: 1,300
- Location: Beijing, People's Republic of China
- Campus: Urban, 82 ha (200 acres)
- Website: english.btbu.edu.cn

Chinese name
- Simplified Chinese: 北京工商大学
- Traditional Chinese: 北京工商大學
Transcriptions
Standard Mandarin
- Hanyu Pinyin: Běijīng Gōngshāng Dàxué

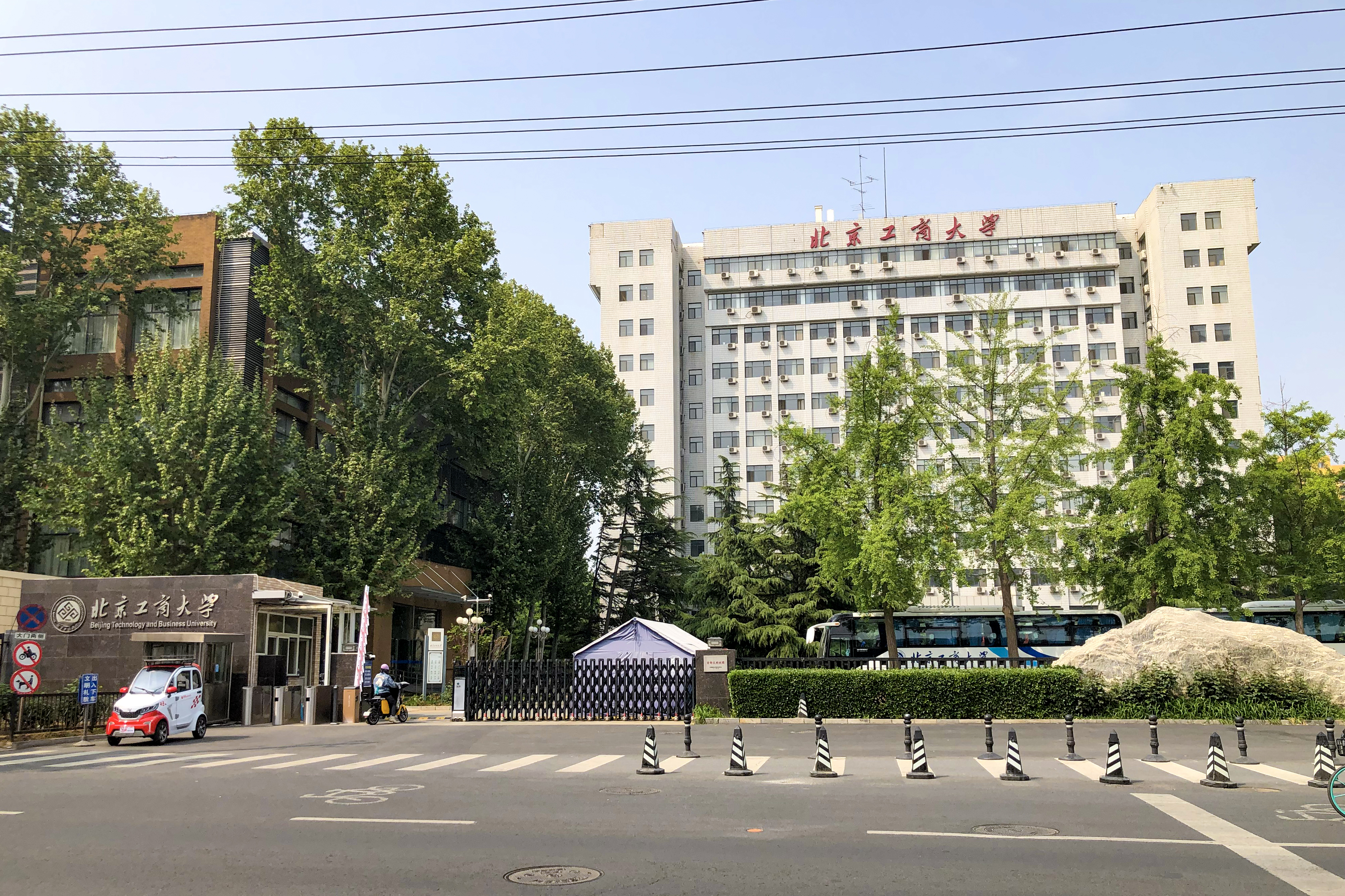
South gate of BTBU main campus

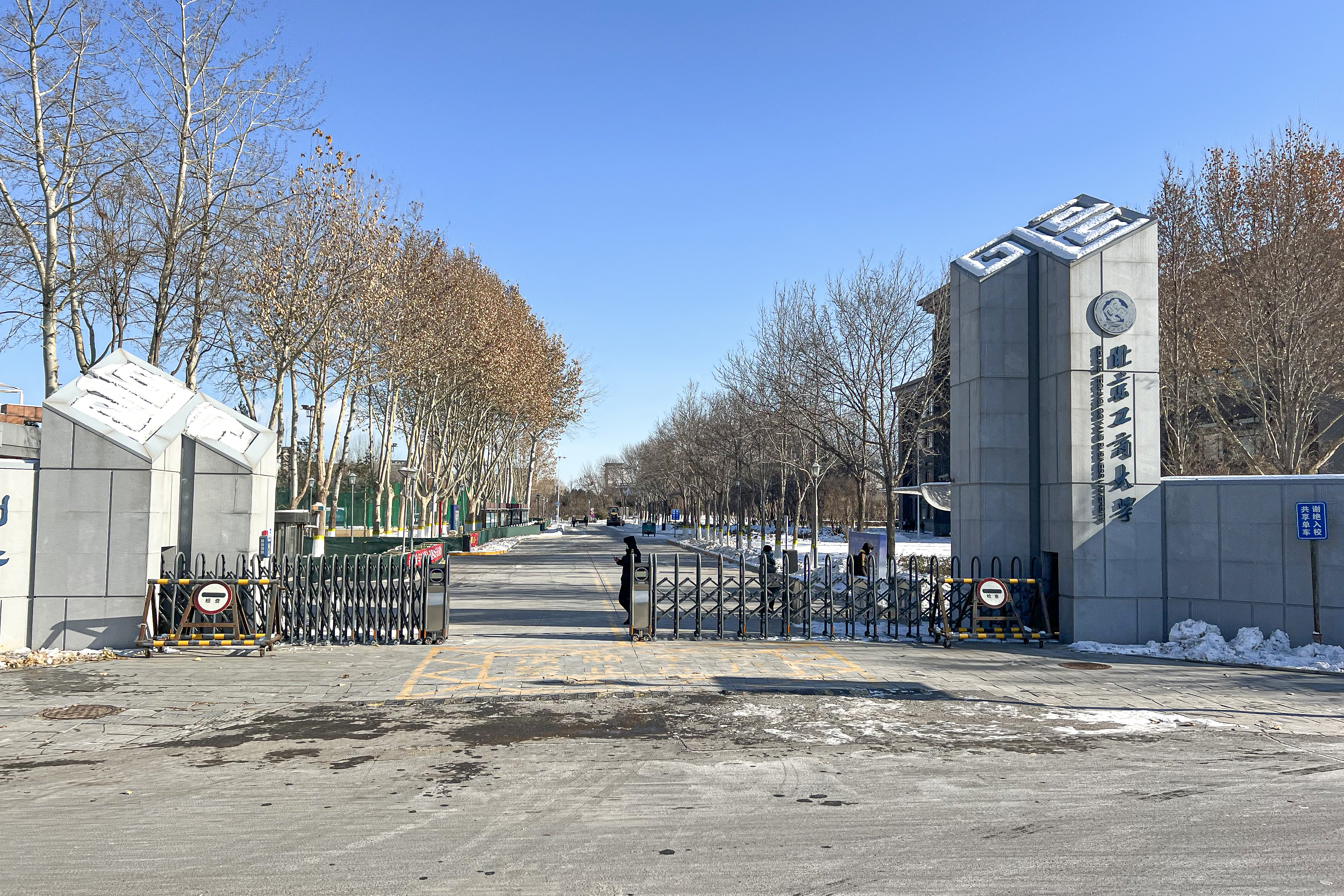
BTBU Liangxiang campus in Fangshan District

Beijing Technology and Business University (BTBU; 北京工商大学) is a municipal public university in Beijing, China. It was founded based on the amalgamation of Beijing Light Industry School, Beijing Business School, and the Administration School for Ministry of Machinery Industry.

== Academics ==
Under the university, there are 16 schools, 1 department (Research Institute), and 1 education center, within which are 43 undergraduate majors, 35 postgraduate majors, 2 master's degree programs, and some joint doctoral programs that are offered. Among those majors and programs, 16 are awarded the Beijing Municipal and Preferential-construction disciplines or majors. Also at BTBU, there exist 2 national industrial test centers, 1 national experimental center for Practical Teaching, 1 Beijing Municipal Key Lab, and 2 Beijing Municipal Research Bases.

There are three academicians of the Chinese Academy of Engineering in BTBU.

At present, the university has 807 full-time faculty members, 48% of whom have senior professional titles. Eight professors enjoy special research allowance from the State Council; two are awarded as China's Excellent Teachers; three are Famous Teachers of Universities in Beijing; five are Excellent Teachers in Beijing; 53 are Excellent Young Teachers in Beijing; and 11 research teams were selected as Academic Innovation Teams of Beijing.

BTBU now has about 12000 full-time undergraduates, 5700 part-time students, and 1300 postgraduates and doctoral students.

== International Cooperation ==
Alongside the Beijing Institute of Light Industry, the BTBU possesses prestigious scholars like Prof. Baoguo Sun, and has been actively involved in International cooperation.

By the agreement signed by the Irish head of government and the Chinese leader (Brian Cowen and Hu Jintao) in 2008, BTBU exchanges lots students and lectures with University College Cork, UCD Dublin, for combined degree programmes (2+2, and 3+1+1/1.5) and non-degree programmes, and recently, with the University of Oxford.

Many students also are recruited by other universities in North America and European, such as Häme University of Applied Sciences.
