= List of Chinese films of 2016 =

The following is a list of mainland Chinese films first released in year 2016.

== Box office ==
These are the top 10 grossing Chinese films that were released in China in 2016:

Highest-grossing domestic films of 2016 in China
| Rank | Title | Domestic gross |
|---|---|---|
| 1 | The Mermaid | $525,690,000 |
| 2 | The Monkey King 2 | $181,970,000 |
| 3 | Operation Mekong | $173,890,000 |
| 4 | The Great Wall | $170,330,000 |
| 5 | From Vegas to Macau III | $169,340,000 |
| 6 | Kung Fu Panda 3 | $155,050,000 |
| 7 | Time Raiders | $149,960,000 |
| 8 | Skiptrace | $132,940,000 |
| 9 | I Belonged to You | $121,310,000 |
| 10 | Finding Mr. Right 2 | $119,510,000 |

== Films released ==
=== January–March ===
| Opening | | Title | Director | Cast | Genre | Notes | Ref. |
|---|---|---|---|---|---|---|---|
| J A N U A R Y | 1 | The Emperor’s New Clothes | Li Xia | | Comedy / Animation | | |
| J A N U A R Y | 1 | Everybody's Fine | Zhang Meng | Zhang Guoli, Yao Chen, Shawn Dou, Ye Qianyun, Chen He, Jia Zhangke, Zhang Yibai, Vivian Wu, Zhou Dongyu, Wang Qianyuan, Fan Wei, Zhang Xinyi, Zhang Yi | Drama / Family | | |
| J A N U A R Y | 1 | The Ice Beauty | Vladimir Menshov | Weinageladuowa·Kajielinna, Andrey Lazarev, Xilianna·Anijiyewa, Aoi Mizuhara, Zhao Huixian | Romance / Fantasy / Adventure | Mainland-Russia co-production | |
| J A N U A R Y | 1 | Intimate Trap | Wang Jiashan | Fanny Liu, Wang Yufu, Jiang Feilong | Suspense / Thriller / Horror | | |
| J A N U A R Y | 1 | Little Door Gods | Gary Wang | Gao Xiaosong, Show Joy, White. K, Ji Guanlin | Comedy / Animation / Fantasy | | |
| J A N U A R Y | 3 | Love is Crazy | Chen Jian | Li Jing, Zhang Zhihan, An Yuxi, Zhao Zijuan, Zhu Zhu | Romance / Family | | |
| J A N U A R Y | 7 | A Bite of China: Celebrating the Chinese New Year | Chen Lei; Deng Jie; Li Yong | Li Lihong | Documentary | | |
| J A N U A R Y | 8 | Strange Battle | Zhang Shaojun | Wang Xiaoyi, Huang Bailu, Norman Chu, Zong Liqun, Xiao Yi, Zhu Laicheng, Yu Qiuyao, Luo Buyi, Yang Lin, Li Ran | Thriller | | |
| J A N U A R Y | 15 | Chinese Wine | Song Jiangbo | Huang Yi, Van Fan, Winston Chao, Hou Tianlai, Shi Zhaoqi, Terence Yin | Drama | | |
| J A N U A R Y | 15 | I'm Handsome | Wang Yichuan; Huang Hai | Liu Chao, Yin Hang, He Yun, Leo Li, Li Yan | Drama / Comedy | | |
| J A N U A R Y | 15 | Royal Treasure | Ren Jing; Yan Min | Huang Bo, Sun Honglei, Huang Lei, Show Lo, Wang Xun, Zhang Yixing, Zhao Liying, Yu Hewei | Comedy / Mystery | | |
| J A N U A R Y | 15 | The Secret | Wong Chun-chun | Leon Lai, Wang Luodan, JJ Lin, Sandrine Pinna, Shek Sau | Romance / Suspense | | |
| J A N U A R Y | 15 | Three Bad Guys | Zhou Zhiyong | Ming Dow, Cherrie Ying, Oscar Qian, Xie Yilin, Kôji Yano, Lemon Zhang, Tian Yuan, Yang Kaidi, Tanas Kim, Gong Zhe, Jiang Zhignag, Joe Chen | Comedy / Romance | | |
| J A N U A R Y | 16 | Boonie Bears III | Ding Liang; Lin Yongchang | Zhang Wei, Zhang Bingjun, Tan Xiao | Comedy / Animation / Adventure | | |
| J A N U A R Y | 22 | The Apparition | Guo Dalei | Max Mok, Zhu Zhu, Chen Tingjia, Chin Shih-chieh, Zhuge Chengcheng | Drama / Mystery / Horror | | |
| J A N U A R Y | 22 | The Big Lie Bang | Hou Liang | Oscar Sun, Michelle Bai, Pan Shuangshuang, Chang Yuan, Ji Jie, Zhang Songwen | Comedy / Mystery | | |
| J A N U A R Y | 22 | Dad, I Will Rescue You | Ye Tian | Oscar Qian, Liu Hanqiang, Li Shangyi, Cui Jie, Wong Yat-fei, Wang Zixuan, Zhang Hailing, Ma Zhaozhuang, Gao Teng | Comedy / Action / Family / Child / Adventure | | |
| J A N U A R Y | 22 | The Family Running Forward | Li Ping | Peng Yu, Liu Yan, Du Haitao, Chen Yingjun, Wang Yongguang, Li Xiaojia, Wang Xiangping, Yang Shanshan, Song Gu, Yue Jingwei, Li Guyi, Shen Ling | Drama / Comedy | | |
| J A N U A R Y | 22 | Inside or Outside | Gary Mak | Simon Yam, Wallace Huo, Jang Hyuk, Rayza, Che Xiao, Aisa Senda, Andrew Lin, Han Ji-seok, Jack Kao | Mystery / Crime | | |
| J A N U A R Y | 22 | Please Open Your Window | Jiang Liu | Yang Xinyi, Hu Xilong, Yao Yitian, Duan You, Liu Yichen | Drama / Family | | |
| J A N U A R Y | 22 | Steel Baard Rria | Chen Yazhou | Nuer Biya, Li Dapeng, Xu Yue, Zhao Hanjun | Drama / Comedy | | |
| J A N U A R Y | 23 | The Ape Story | Liu Pan | Lu Peiyu, Luo Yanqian, Wang Susu | Comedy / Animation / Adventure | | |
| J A N U A R Y | 23 | Fruity Robo The Great Escape | Wang Wei | Lai Hongyu, Zu Liqing, Ju Yuebin, Shen Ke, Wang Wei, Lu Shuang, Deng Hong, Liao Chenxi, Li Tuan, Zhao Ran, Chen Yu | Comedy / Animation / Adventure | | |
| J A N U A R Y | 28 | Yu Lian Mi Qing | Wang Bo | Wang Zhensen, Tao Huan | Drama / Romance / Mystery / Thriller | | |
| J A N U A R Y | 29 | For Love | Zheng Laizhi | Li Feier, Huang Ming, Li Jinming, Leon Jay Williams, Du Haitao | Comedy / Romance | | |
| J A N U A R Y | 29 | Kung Fu Panda 3 | Jennifer Yuh Nelson; Alessandro Carloni | Jack Black, Bryan Cranston, Dustin Hoffman, Angelina Jolie, J. K. Simmons, Jackie Chan, Seth Rogen, Lucy Liu, David Cross, Kate Hudson, James Hong, Randall Duk Kim | Comedy / Action / Animation / Adventure | Mainland-United States co-production | |
| J A N U A R Y | 29 | Lost in the Pacific | Vincent Zhou | Brandon Routh, Zhang Yuqi, Russell Wong, Vincent M. Ward, Dai Xiangyu, Bernice Liu, Debbie Goh, Sunny Wang, Jiang Mengjie, Steven Dasz | Drama / Sci-Fi / Adventure | | |
| J A N U A R Y | 29 | My Best Friends | Huo Meng | Wang Jingchun, Tong Yue, Liu Guancheng, Dai Jiang | Drama / Comedy / Romance | | |
| J A N U A R Y | 29 | Out of Ordinary | Li Baosheng | Sun Haiying, Lü Liping, Kent Tong, Zhang Boyu, Yang Shuting, Wu Jiayi, Ali Lee, Zhu Ziyan | Drama | | |
| J A N U A R Y | 29 | Youth in the Air Outlet | Zhou Xiaopeng | Chen Weidong, Lu Enjie, Tu Xiayan, Jiang Yiyi, Hou Di | Comedy / Romance | | |
| F E B R U A R Y | 1 | The New Year's Eve of Old Lee | Gao Qunshu | Zhao Benshan, Yan Ni, Rayza, Aaron Yan, Pan Binlong, Da Peng, Zhang Yi, Liang Jing, Zhou Dongyu, Yu Hewei, Lian Yiming, Mai Hongmei, Chen Xiaoqing, Yu Feihong, Song Yanfei, Yao Chen, Wen Zhang, Zhang Xinyi, Chen He, Yuan Hong, Sha Yi, Xiaoshenyang, Wang Xiaoli, Song Xiaobao, Liu Xiaoguang | Comedy | | |
| F E B R U A R Y | 8 | From Vegas to Macau III | Andrew Lau; Wong Jing | Chow Yun-fat, Andy Lau, Nick Cheung, Jacky Cheung, Shawn Yue, Li Yuchun, Carina Lau, Angela Wang, Jacky Heung, Michelle Hu, Janice Man, Yuen Qiu, Psy, Kimmy Tong, Law Kar-ying, Lo Hoi-pang | Comedy / Action | Mainland-Hong Kong co-production | |
| F E B R U A R Y | 8 | The Mermaid | Stephen Chow | Deng Chao, Show Lo, Zhang Yuqi, Lin Yun, Kris Wu, Li Shangzheng, White. K, Kong Lianshun, Tin Kai-man, Tsui Hark, Wen Zhang, Yang Neng, Zhang Mei'e, Bo Xiaolong | Drama / Romance / Sci-Fi | | |
| F E B R U A R Y | 8 | The Monkey King 2 | Cheang Pou-soi | Aaron Kwok, Gong Li, Feng Shaofeng, Xiaoshenyang, Him Law, Fei Xiang, Kelly Chen | Comedy / Action / Fantasy | Mainland-Hong Kong co-production | |
| F E B R U A R Y | 8 | Mr. Nian | Zhang Yang | Lei Jiayin, Zhou Dongyu, Chen He, Tao Hong, Guo Tao, Patrick Guo, Liu Yiwei, Shen Teng, Zhang Yibai, Wang Xun, Hao Yun, Xie Na, Xiong Naijin | Comedy / Animation / Fantasy | | |
| F E B R U A R Y | 11 | Be Not Trivial Matter | Zhou Yihua; Fang Xiaogang | Gong Hanlin, Jin Zhu, Zhu Lisha, Zhan Dou, Shen Baoping, Lü Zhong, Cui Kefa | Drama / Comedy / Romance / Family | | |
| F E B R U A R Y | 14 | Kill Time | Fruit Chan | Angelababy, Ethan Juan, Juck Zhang, Rayza, Hao Lei, Pan Hong, Yin Zhusheng, Huang Jue, Kou Zhenhai, Lam Suet, Song Ning | Romance / Suspense | Mainland-Hong Kong co-production | |
| F E B R U A R Y | 14 | Mr. High Heels | Lu Ke | Du Jiang, Fiona Sit, Yu Xintian, Chen Xuedong, Wong Cho-lam, Huo Siyan, Li Yuan, Xiao Xiao, Li Yu | Comedy / Romance | | |
| F E B R U A R Y | 14 | Run for Love | Zhang Yibai; Guan Hu; Zhang Meng; Teng Huatao; Gao Qunshu | Zhang Ziyi, Eddie Peng, Tong Liya, Zhou Dongyu, Michelle Chen, Zhang Yi, Liang Jing, Wang Qianyuan, Wu Mochou, Sebastian Stigar | Drama / Romance | | |
| F E B R U A R Y | 19 | Crouching Tiger, Hidden Dragon: Sword of Destiny | Yuen Woo-ping | Donnie Yen, Michelle Yeoh, Harry Shum, Jr., Natasha Liu Bordizzo, Jason Scott Lee, Eugenia Yuan, Veronica Ngo, Shuya Chang, Chris Pang, Woon Young-park, Zhou Xiaofei | Drama / Action / Fantasy / Adventure | Mainland-United States co-production | |
| F E B R U A R Y | 19 | The Frog Kingdom 2: Sub-Zero Mission | Chang Guangxi; Peng Fei | Sun Nan, Shi Banyu, Jiang Guijin, Mai Baoyao | Comedy / Animation / Adventure | | |
| F E B R U A R Y | 19 | The Game | Yi Ping | Liu Qing, Zhou Haodong, Su Ting, Yang Haichao, Wei Jianyun, Zhao Tingting | Suspense / Thriller | | |
| F E B R U A R Y | 19 | Money and Love | Sun Hongkai | Cao Yunjin, Zhou Zhi, Du Haitao, Wu Xin, Jacky Wu, Daniel Chan, Jiang Chao, Su Xing, Oscar Sun, Zhang Yuxi, Wan Guopeng, Sun Yaoqi, Liu Yase, Mike Sui, Vivien Li, Han Yunyun, Ba Duo | Drama / Comedy / Romance | | |
| F E B R U A R Y | 25 | The Weird Doll | Cheung Kwok-kuen | Li Yuhang, Cheng Yuanyuan, Kong Wei | Thriller / Horror | | |
| F E B R U A R Y | 25 | When We Were Young | Chang Zheng | Hu Suhan, Yin Liang, Chen Changhai, Ding Dang, Wang Xinhua, Guo Jiulong | Drama | | |
| M A R C H | 4 | You Really Are My Lover | Chen Yutian | Wei Lianfeng, Tian Yue, Qi Jiuzhou, Gao Chuan, Zhang Jingsheng | Romance | | |
| M A R C H | 8 | Spicy Hot in Love | Xiao Fei; Zhang Changzheng | Peter Ho, Qin Hao, Zhou Yiwei, Zhang Zilin, Tian Yuan, Acan Huang, Zhang Xinyi, Hai Yitian, Ady An, Jin Zhiwen, Jack Kao, Liu Xin, Li Xuanzhen | Romance | | |
| M A R C H | 11 | Don't Run the Thief | Lei Jinke | Peng Bo, Li Tiannuo, Dong Xiangrong, Han Feng, Dong Yijun | Comedy / Action / Costume | | |
| M A R C H | 11 | Judge Archer | Xu Haofeng | Song Yang, Yu Chenghui, Li Chengyuan, Wang Yanni, Zhao Zheng, Li Changlin, Ma Jun | Drama / Martial arts / Costume | Entered into the 49th Golden Horse Film Festival | |
| M A R C H | 11 | Love Studio | Cheng Zhonghao; Wang Kai | Jiang Chao, Cica Zhou, Li Meng, Yu Menglong, Mandy Lee, Zhang Lei, Em Qi, Hei Ge | Comedy / Romance | | |
| M A R C H | 11 | Under the Bed | Shang Yongfeng | Abby, Jiang Wenxuan, Miao Qing, Liu Liyuan, Song Wei | Thriller / Horror | | |
| M A R C H | 11 | Wang Mao | Zhao Xiaoxi | Wang Dazhi, Guo Jinjie, Ge Xiaofeng, Su Li, Luo Jingmin, Xu Jian, Lin Yongjian, Liu Jiang, De Jiang | Comedy / War | | |
| M A R C H | 15 | Never Forgive | Sun Tie | Wu Gang, Liu Bin, Jie Bing, Zhao Luokuang | Drama | | |
| M A R C H | 15 | Ya Hai Er | Yang Yizhi | Wu Ma, Sun Guitian, Xie Mengwei, Xiong Ke, Chang Ruoxi, Chen Jiayang, Guo Zhanyue, Lala, Ge Qihao, Guo Ziyuan | Drama | | |
| M A R C H | 17 | Red Cheongsam | Wang Liang | Wang Liang, Qin Xue, Cici Hong, Li Beilei, Zhang Guodong, Gu Peng | Drama / Romance / Mystery / Thriller | | |
| M A R C H | 18 | Papa | Zheng Xiao | Xia Yu, Song Zuer, Yang Zi, David Wu, Jiang Shan, Hu Bing, Mike Sui, Brother Sway, Macy Gray, Dennis Oh, Candice Zhao, Emily Kinney, Jake Elliott, Anjini Azhar, Chloe Perrin, Dai Huanyu, Claire Jacobs | Comedy / Family | | |
| M A R C H | 18 | The Rise of a Tomboy | Guo Dalei | Zhao Liying, Hans Zhang, Kimmy Tong, Jung Il-woo, Simon Twu, Alan Dawa Dolma, Xu Feng, He Wenhui, Wang Yiwei, Mu Cong, Chin Shih-chieh | Comedy / Romance | | |
| M A R C H | 18 | Road to the Sky | Wang Yi | Johnny Kou, Liu Xiaoxiao, Wang Bo-chieh, Zhang Zhengxiang, Yi Shan, Yang Buting | Romance | Entered into the 2015 Montreal World Film Festival | |
| M A R C H | 25 | Easy Life | Zhu Qing | Zhang Tianyang, He Hongshan, Wan Cang, Jin Liang, Yu Dejiang, Ji Shuhai | Action / Romance / Martial arts / Costume | | |
| M A R C H | 25 | Fear is Coming | Zhang Yang | Xie Ronger, Mik Thongraya, Yang Xing, You Le'er, Li Mengmeng, Zhou Yaping, Yan Zi, Guo Zhongyou, Yang Ziyi, Peng Yibo, Chang Xiaoxiao, Xu Xihan, Yu Lei, Liu Baole, Ren Jiao, Jiang Haotong, Che Jingzi, Sun Manling | Thriller / Horror | | |
| M A R C H | 25 | Girls' Generation | Ah Niu, Zhao Yu, Teddy Chin | Huang Cancan, Nan Sheng, Owodog, Hayden Wang, Jayden Wang, Ke Qing, Daphne Chuah, Yumi Wong, Jiang Qianling | Drama | | |
| M A R C H | 25 | Hui Xiang Dou Er | Guo Feng | Da Bing, Bai Bo, Huang Keyuan, Wu Qiong, Lü Xiaohe | Comedy | | |
| M A R C H | 25 | Jia Zhuang Kan Bui Jian Zhi Dian Ying Da Shi | Wei Jie | Yao Xingtong, Lee Hyun-jae, Ming Ren, Wang Duoduo, Cynthia, Liu Yang, Benz Hui, Kingdom Yuen, Jang Woo-hyuk | Comedy | | |
| M A R C H | 25 | One Night of Fate | Miao Shu | Xiao Haoran, Xu Xiyao, Jiang Chao, Sammy Lau, Xia Yunfei, Chen Kuan-tai, Liu Yuting | Drama / Comedy / Romance | | |
| M A R C H | 25 | The White-Haired Girl | Hou Keming | Lei Jia, Zhang Yingxi, Gao Peng, Qian Zhiguo, Wu Meng, Chang Tong | Chinese opera | | |

=== April–June ===
| Opening | | Title | Director | Cast | Genre | Notes | Ref. |
|---|---|---|---|---|---|---|---|
| A P R I L | 1 | The Bodyguard | Sammo Hung | Sammo Hung, Andy Lau, Zhu Yuchen, Li Qinqin, Feng Jiayi, Jacqueline Chan, Hu Jun, Feng Shaofeng, Eddie Peng, Song Jia, Tsui Hark, Karl Maka, Dean Shek, Yuen Biao, Yuen Qiu, Yuen Wah, Wu Ming-tsai, Yuen Bo | Comedy / Action / Mystery / Adventure | Mainland-Hong Kong co-production | |
| A P R I L | 1 | Bomb! Bomb! Bomb! | Lin Zi | Hai Yang, Zhang Xiaojue, Wang Ge, Feng Kai, Pan Yian, Zhang Yafei, Leo Wu, Guan Zhe | Comedy / Romance / Fantasy | | |
| A P R I L | 1 | Chongqing Hot Pot | Yang Qing | Chen Kun, Bai Baihe, Qin Hao, Yu Entai | Drama | Entered into the 2016 Hong Kong International Film Festival | |
| A P R I L | 1 | The Guest | Lim Dae-woong | Leon Lai, Geng Le, Han Chae-young | Mystery / Crime | Mainland-South Korea co-production | |
| A P R I L | 1 | Who Sleeps My Bro | Zhang Qi | Chen Xiao, Qin Lan, Calvin Tu, Liu Ruilin, Li Xian, Yu Xintian, Lan Yingying, Jiang Xueming, Wang Xiaokun | Drama / Romance | | |
| A P R I L | 1 | Xuan Yuan the Great Emperor | Li Xiaojun | Yu Bo, Cica Zhou, Ban Jiajia, Wang Deshun, Li Qilong, Sudengzha Musu, Tan Xiaohao | Drama | | |
| A P R I L | 2 | Space Panda 3 | Zheng Chengfeng | | Comedy / Sci-Fi / Animation / Adventure | | |
| A P R I L | 8 | Ghost Neighbor | Xing Bo | Li Zuofei, Cao Zichen | Thriller | | |
| A P R I L | 8 | The Little | Ke Wei | Zhang Jixuan, Zhao Yuanyuan, Shi Lei, Chen Haoming | Romance | | |
| A P R I L | 8 | Midnight Record Search | Liu Tianrong | Sha Yi, Hu Ke, Li Qi, Fu Hong | Thriller / Horror | | |
| A P R I L | 15 | The Deadly Reasoning | | | Mystery | | |
| A P R I L | 15 | Lost in White | Xu Wei | Tony Leung Ka-fai, Tong Dawei, Zhou Dongyu, Deng Jiajia, Vision Wei, Cao Weiyu | Action / Mystery / Crime | | |
| A P R I L | 15 | Mother's Revenge | Zhao Xiaoxi | Wang Chong, Wang Danwei, Tian Miao, Xiao Yanbo, Wu Xi, Zhai Hongyu, Lu Feng, Wen Ting, Peng Zhongyang, Zhang Guorong, Chen Yupeng | Suspense / Thriller / Horror | | |
| A P R I L | 15 | New York New York | Luo Dong | Ethan Juan, Du Juan, Michael Miu, Cecilia Yip, Peter Greene, Yuan Wenkang, Huang Ling, Shi An, Shao Wen, Yang Xuwen, Ma Yanting, MC Jin | Drama / Romance | Mainland-Hong Kong co-production | |
| A P R I L | 15 | When We Were Young | Yan Ran | Wang Ziyi, Ariel Aisin-Gioro, Zhang Doudou, Xu Zhengting | Drama | | |
| A P R I L | 20 | Tendresse in Your Voice | Pan Mingguang | Jia Yiping, Chen Yinuo, He Gang, Liu Can, Zhang Yao, Zhang Heng | Drama / Romance | | |
| A P R I L | 22 | Buddy Cops | Peter Chik | Bosco Wong, King Kong Lee, Eric Tsang, Kate Tsui, Charmaine Fong, Jordan Chan, Gordon Lam, Stanley Fung, Elaine Jin, Candice Yu, Michael Tse, Alice Chan | Comedy / Action | Mainland-Hong Kong co-production | |
| A P R I L | 22 | Goddess Era | Bosco Lin | Gao Lihong, Wei Wei, Rina An, Lam Suet, He Minghan, He Gang, Li Gen, Zhong Lei, Zou Jingjing | Comedy / Romance | | |
| A P R I L | 22 | Insomnia Lover | Yuan Jie | Treechada Petcharat, Deng Zifeng, Yang Liao, Zhao Yixin, Patrick Tam, Teddy Lin, Wong Yat-fei, Kingdom Yuen | Comedy / Romance | | |
| A P R I L | 22 | Music And Dream | Li Qingcheng | Wang Xianghong, Tong Xin, Tang Jiacheng, Yao Yuxin | Suspense / Thriller | | |
| A P R I L | 22 | My New Sassy Girl | Joh Keun-shik | Victoria Song, Cha Tae-hyun, Mina Fujii, Choi Jin-ho, Bae Seong-woo | Romance / Comedy | Mainland-South Korea co-production | |
| A P R I L | 22 | My Ten Million | Xiao Xunlin | Benji Chiang, Paul Chun, Ken Lok, He Jie, Li Manyi, Wang Mingshuai, Huang Yonggang, Yang Jia, He Yufei, Ou Ning, Meng Xin, Zhang Linxiong, Li Yan | Drama / Mystery | | |
| A P R I L | 22 | Yesterday Once More | Yoyo Yao | Bai Jingting, Guo Shutong, Li Hongyi, Wang Herun, Ding Guansen, Zhao Wenlong | Romance | | |
| A P R I L | 29 | Book of Love | Xue Xiaolu | Tang Wei, Wu Xiubo, Paul Chun, Kara Hui, Wang Zhiwen, Lu Yi, Zu Feng, Liu Zhihong, Cherry Ngan | Comedy / Romance | | |
| A P R I L | 29 | MBA Partners | Jang Tae-yoo | Yao Chen, Tiffany Tang, Hao Lei, Li Chen, Wang Yibo, Aaron Kwok, Kim Sung-joo, Kent Tong, Gallen Lo, Lam Suet | Drama / Romance | | |
| A P R I L | 29 | Phantom of the Theatre | Raymond Yip | Ruby Lin, Tony Yang, Simon Yam, Huang Huan, Jing Gangshan, Lin Jiangguo, Natalie Meng, Zhang Zifeng, Huang Lei, Li Jing, He Yunwei | Thriller | Mainland-Hong Kong co-production | |
| A P R I L | 29 | Xuan Zang | Huo Jianqi | Huang Xiaoming, Xu Zheng, Purba Rgyal, Luo Jin, Tan Kai, Vivian Dawson, Jiang Chao, Che Xiao, Lou Jiayue, Kent Tong, Zhao Liang | History | | |
| A P R I L | 30 | A Li Ba Ba 2: Suo Luo Men Feng Yin | Zheng Chengfeng | Ding Yan, Ye Fang, Yang Jin, Sun Ke, Zhang Yang, Ge Jun | Comedy / Animation / Adventure | | |
| A P R I L | 30 | Ma Xiaole and His Toys | | | Animation / Fantasy / Adventure | | |
| A P R I L | 30 | Qing Wa Zong Dong Yuan | Yang Renxian | Ji Jing, Guo Zhengjian, Bai Tao, Wang Qiuming, Ku Feng, Teng Kuixing, Li Jinyan | Comedy / Animation | | |
| M A Y | 1 | Wind Chimes on the Card | Hu Yang | Li Chunli, Fu Shiyu, Gao Renhui | Drama / Romance / Child | | |
| M A Y | 6 | Bu Ji Lan | An Xingwei | Wang Yu, Liu Xingsheng, Narenqi Muge, Wulanqi Qige | Drama | Entered into the 2016 Beijing International Film Festival | |
| M A Y | 6 | Delusion | Danny Pang Phat | Pakho Chau, An Hu, Cici Hong, Cheng Yuanyuan, Timmy Hung | Suspense / Thriller | | |
| M A Y | 6 | God’s Hug | Li Xiaojun | Tian Yue, Rong Zixi, Yang Tong, Shi Yuanting, Liu Wei, He Yunwei | Drama / Romance | | |
| M A Y | 6 | Heaven of Nestling | Zhan Junke | Li Fengxu, Yang Xiaomi, Li Jinzhe, Qiu Yucheng, Mao Hanyi, Fang Yizhou, Chen Ruijia, Zhao Kuang, Lin Yibai, Han Jiqing | Drama | | |
| M A Y | 6 | Sentence Me Guilty | Sun Liang | Li Xinyun, Francis Ng, Leon Dai, Tian Xiaojie, Chris Lee | Drama / Mystery | Entered into the 20th Busan International Film Festival | |
| M A Y | 6 | Song of the Phoenix | Wu Tianming | Tao Zeru, Li Mincheng | Drama | Entered into the 2013 Golden Rooster and Hundred Flowers Film Festival | |
| M A Y | 13 | 22nd Catch | Liu Guang-hui | Qin Hailu, Van Fan, Weng Chia-ming, Ou Ning, Esther Liu, Jill Hsu, Run Bao, Tino Bao | Comedy / Romance | Mainland-Taiwan co-production | |
| M A Y | 13 | Bloody House | Gao Yuxin; Liu Feng | Song Yijie, Jiang Xinqi, Zhang Lanyi, Wang Yanyang, Ma Danni, Li Yanbing, Scud, Deng Linying | Suspense / Thriller | | |
| M A Y | 13 | Distance | Xin Yukun; Tan Shijie; Sivaroj Kongsakul | Chen Bolin, Jiang Wenli, Tony Yang, Paul Chun, Pat, Feng Li, Yeo Yann Yann | Drama / Romance / Homosexual / Family | Entered into the 2015 Taipei Golden Horse Film Festival | |
| M A Y | 13 | Don't Open the Door | Zhou Ge | Xu Li, Qu Shaoshi, Yang Long, Zhao Hongji, Li Henan, Wang Chang, Cao Lei, Li Xinrui, Liu Jin, Liu Zhu | Suspense / Thriller | | |
| M A Y | 20 | 708090 | Lin Yiqi; Deng Jianquan; Chen Muchuan | Kenji Wu, Song Ji-hyo, Zhao Yihuan, Ray Lui, Irene Wan, Duo Liang, Li Fengming, Chen Rui, Lau Shek-yin, Zhao Chenyan, Li Donghan, Shang Kan, Jolie Fan | Drama / Romance | | |
| M A Y | 20 | Brothers | Ah Gan | Peter Ho, Ethan Li, Xia Zitong, Yang Qiming, Tian Yuan, He Lanpeng, Song Ning, Wang Wang, Huang Tianyuan | Drama / Action | | |
| M A Y | 20 | The Death Note | Jiang Jun | Cao Feiran, Li Zheng, Li Ben | Suspense / Thriller / Horror | | |
| M A Y | 20 | In the Rain | Tang Yongkang | Li Yuhang, Wang Yue, Qiu Yunhe, Zhan Junlin | Romance | | |
| M A Y | 20 | Night Peacock | Dai Sijie | Liu Yifei, Liu Ye, Yu Shaoqun, Leon Lai | Drama / Romance | Mainland-France co-production | |
| M A Y | 20 | Plastic Surgeon: Hunted Face | Huang Jun | Pu Pu, Li Wenwen, Fang Hui, Sun Zujun, Liu Tianzuo | Suspense / Thriller | | |
| M A Y | 20 | Water Dream | Chang Xiaoyang | Hu Ming, Shi Lin | Drama | | |
| M A Y | 25 | Self Redemption | Zhu Jianghua; Wang Shouyue | Sun Boyang, Chen Meixing, Chen Zheng, Wang Qingxiang, Peng Bo, Wang Lei, Ren Xihong, Zi Xi | Drama | | |
| M A Y | 27 | A Horse with Hope | Bai Haibin | Huang Lu, Wei Zaizhong | Drama | | |
| M A Y | 27 | Jungle Master: The Candy World | Xu Kerr | Huang Ying, An Qi, Li Zhengxiang, Zhang Xin, Jiang Yuling | Animation / Fantasy / Adventure | | |
| M A Y | 27 | Murder at Honeymoon Hotel | Jang Cheol-soo; Li Guanghao; Qian Bingzhe | Zhang Jingchu, Peter Ho, Kim Young-min, Ni Hongjie, Goh Wee Ping, Wen Xiang | Drama / Mystery | Mainland-South Korea co-production | |
| M A Y | 27 | Star Ant - Global Adventure | Meng Wenlong; Guan Xiaochao; Tang Huabao | Hu Yanyan, Liu Pei, Li Jing, Dai Yi, Zhang Jinling, Cai Dan, Ze Fei, Li Ming, Mao Mao | Comedy / Animation / Adventure | | |
| M A Y | 27 | Witch Doctor | Wu Zongqiang | Treechada Petcharat, Patrick Tam, Lu Yulai, Meng Yao, Gao Yalin | Suspense / Thriller | Mainland-Thailand co-production | |
| J U N E | 1 | Dragon Warrior | Li Dongtai | | Animation / Fantasy | | |
| J U N E | 1 | Floraand Fauna’s War | | | Animation | | |
| J U N E | 1 | Fruit Story | Yang Jinsong; Liang Donglong; Liu Pingjie; Lu Wei | Zu Qing, Ming Jing, Xiao Yu, Jiang Linchen, Li Jing, Huang Shanshan, Mao Mao, Xiao Ma, Qi Jining, Ma Rui, Zhao Ran, Ze Fei | Comedy / Animation | | |
| J U N E | 1 | Kunta | Li Lian | | Animation | | |
| J U N E | 1 | The Spring in the Winter | Law Wing-cheung | Ning Lu, Wu Junyu, Law Kar-ying, Amy Chan, Pan Jie, Bobby Tsang, Billy Lau, Chun Wong, Ma Qiguang | Drama | | |
| J U N E | 3 | Fright Night | Mai Zi | Jill Hsu, Chen Bingqiang, Chen Huan | Thriller / Horror | | |
| J U N E | 3 | Memento Mori | Park Yu-hwan | Lei Jiayin, Xia Zitong, Li Jing, Sun Ning, He Yunwei | Comedy / Mystery | | |
| J U N E | 9 | Toys War | | Deng Xiaoting, Zhao Ben, Bai Wenxian, Sun Yajun | Comedy / Animation | | |
| J U N E | 10 | Our Graduation | Cheng Zhonghao; Wang Kai | Kimmy Tong, Gao Taiyu, Xie Yingfei, Ma Ding, Qiao Xi | Comedy / Romance | | |
| J U N E | 17 | The Curse of Chopsticks | Ji Yu | Hu Yingyi, Zhu Xuan, Zhou Jun, Sun Chen, Li Yazhen, Rong Yi, Wang Yu, Wang Yichan, Wang Lan | Thriller / Horror | | |
| J U N E | 17 | The Flowers Blooming | Ji Ming | Chen Shanshan, Ma Zijing, Zhao Fuli | Drama / Family | | |
| J U N E | 17 | Love of the Sea | Alan | Han Zaishi, Ju Hao, Wang Kuirong, A Wei, Yin Dandan, Zheng Zixun | Romance / Sci-Fi | | |
| J U N E | 17 | One Night | Liu Ziwei; Fu Weng | Wang Junping, Fu Weng, Du Xiaoxiong, Zhou Yenan, Wang Zhuo, Ju Hongyu, Deng Hongyang | Drama / Comedy | | |
| J U N E | 17 | Warrior VS Dragon | Zhou Bin | Ge Zhangjun, Piao Shao, Chen Bo, An Ni, Huang Zhenji, Shan Xin, Chen Gongjie, Cui Jianwen, Tute Hameng, BBC, Wu Zhongyu, Tao Bao, Hai Tao, Xia Yike | Comedy / Animation / Adventure | | |
| J U N E | 17 | When the Meteor Shot Across the Sky | Song Qi | Xu Nuo, Sun Lihua, Liang Yu, Yang Xiaorong | Drama / Romance | | |
| J U N E | 18 | Seven Days | Xing Jian | Wang Deshun, Huang Songbo | Drama | Entered into the 2015 Montreal World Film Festival | |
| J U N E | 20 | Yu Wang Sen Lin | Zhou Sansheng; Zhou Chongyang; Xiao Yuhang | Li Shengxiong, Zhang Yongxian, Huang Shengliang, Zhang Chi, Yu Sutong | Drama / Romance / Sci-Fi / Fiction / Erotica | | |
| J U N E | 23 | Nankou in 1937 | Zhu Dan | Sun Kan, Sun Hongtao, Xie Fang, Du Xudong, Liu Jizhong | Drama / War | | |
| J U N E | 24 | The Nursery | Patchanon Thammajira | Zhu Yilong, Peechaya Wattanamontree, Li Jiaming | Thriller / Horror | | |
| J U N E | 24 | Three | Johnnie To | Zhao Wei, Louis Koo, Wallace Chung, Lo Hoi-pang, Lam Suet, Cheung Siu-fai, Michael Tse | Action / Crime | Mainland-Hong Kong co-production | |
| J U N E | 30 | So I Married an Anti-fan | Kim Jae-young | Park Chanyeol, Yuan Shanshan, Jiang Chao, Seohyun | Comedy / Romance | | |

=== July–September ===
| Opening | | Title | Director | Cast | Genre | Notes | Ref. |
|---|---|---|---|---|---|---|---|
| J U L Y | 1 | Bounty Hunters | Shin Tae-ra | Lee Min-ho, Wallace Chung, Tiffany Tang, Jones Xu, Karena Ng, Louis Fan | Drama / Comedy / Action | Mainland-South Korea-Hong Kong co-production | |
| J U L Y | 1 | The Death War | Lin Xiaoxin; Xu Jianghua | He Yujun, Wang Lan, Gao Mingsheng, Hu Zijian, Lv Wenjun, Chen Shengwei, Lu Shaoping, Jiang Linyan, Sun Mingjun, Wang Jun, Wang Xusheng | War | | |
| J U L Y | 1 | Gu Tian Hui Yi | Tan Xiaoming | Xu Bocen, Wang Weizhi, Ashton Chen | History / War | | |
| J U L Y | 1 | The Last Race | Stephen Shin | Joseph Fiennes, Shawn Dou, Darren Grosvenor, Shigeo Kobayashi, Elizabeth Arends | Drama / History / Sport | Mainland-Hong Kong-United States co-production | |
| J U L Y | 1 | The Precipice Game | Wang Zao | Ruby Lin, Peter Ho, Jin Shijia, Wang Ji, Gai Yuexi, Li Lin, Li Shangyi, Shi Zhi, Liu Shijie | Suspense / Thriller | | |
| J U L Y | 1 | Scary Notes | Min Jintao | Zhao Yongxin, Tan Jianci, Feng Jiamei, Pan Chunchun | Thriller / Horror | | |
| J U L Y | 1 | Yin Lingzhi | Wei Xiaotong | Gao Yaoping, Yao Anlian, Wang Jianguo, Li Lin, Yan Qingyu, Zhang Zhihong, Zhang Yeshi, Wang Pengli, Han Sanming, Lu Haihua, An Ning, Xu Li, Ming Junchen | Drama / History / War | | |
| J U L Y | 2 | The Adventures of the Ugly Duckling | Zheng Yi | Zhu Keke, A Fei, Xia Yixuan, Gua Gua, Li Wenhan, Mu Ou, Qing Yun, Rui Qi, Yong Zhe, Bai Mao, A awu | Science Fiction / Animation / Children / Adventure | | |
| J U L Y | 8 | Big Fish & Begonia | Liang Xuan; Zhang Chun | Ji Guanlin, Su Shangqing, Xu Weizhou, Chin Shih-chieh, Yang Ting, Pan Shulan, Jiu Er, Wang Deshun, Zhang Yuanyuan, Jiang Guangtao, A Jie, Ma Zhengyang, Baomu Zhongyang, Liu Xiaoyu | Drama / Animation / Fantasy | | |
| J U L Y | 8 | Chang Chen Ghost Stories | Zhan Yue | Lu Shan, Fu Heng, Wu Jinxi, Song Hanhuan, Ding Qi, Wei Yun, Li Yu, Xu Haipeng | Romance / Suspense / Thriller | | |
| J U L Y | 8 | Foolish Plans | Jiang Tao | Wang Ning, Xiu Rui, Wang Zijian, Wang Ou, Liu Yase, Chen Yang, Wang Yanhui | Comedy / Adventure | | |
| J U L Y | 8 | Never Gone | Zhou Tuoru | Kris Wu, Liu Yifei, Jin Shijia, Li Qin, Li Meng, Hao Shaowen, Chen Ran, Qiao Renliang | Drama / Romance | | |
| J U L Y | 8 | Rock Dog | Ash Brannon | Guo Degang, Guo Qilin, Yu Qian, Feng Xiaogang, Zheng Jun, Sun Yue, Zhu Yunfeng, Liu Yun, Jagger Zheng, Zhang Chucheng | Animation / Music | Mainland-Hong Kong-United States co-production | |
| J U L Y | 8 | Seven Days | Xing Jian | Wang Deshun, Wangshi Wenqi, Huang Songbo, Xu Wenyu, Pu Zhengxi, Xu Songhua, Cui Ziyu | Drama | Entered into the 2015 Montreal World Film Festival | |
| J U L Y | 9 | Coming Home | Xie Zhenghui | Guo Zhengchi, Zhang Rulei, Xia Fandi, Zhang Shihong, Sun Guitian, Dong Ping | Drama | | |
| J U L Y | 9 | Following the Donkey | Yang Lin | Shao Feng, Zhang Yaguang, Huang Chenglin, Li Ruojia, He Miao, Hou Kaiwen | Comedy | | |
| J U L Y | 9 | Joy of Second Child | Xie Zhenghui | Yan Linfei, Chen Haoming, Dong Ping, Li Yan, Li Jiaqi | Comedy / Family | | |
| J U L Y | 15 | The Bodyguard | Yue Song | Yue Song, Xing Yu, Li Yufei, Collin Chou, Michael Chan, Shang Tielong, Xu Dongmei, Yang Jun, Li Changhai, Jiang Baocheng, Yuan Wu, Dong Jiangtao | Drama / Action | | |
| J U L Y | 15 | For a Few Bullets | Pan Anzi | Lin Gengxin, Zhang Jingchu, Tengger, Liu Xiaoqing, Vivian Dawson, Kenneth Tsang, Shi Yufei | Comedy / Action | | |
| J U L Y | 15 | Kaili Blues | Bi Gan | Chen Yongzhong, Xie Lixun, Yu Shixue, Guo Yue | Drama / Fantasy | Entered into the 2015 Locarno International Film Festival | |
| J U L Y | 15 | Movie Master of Pretending | Wei Jie | Yao Xingtong, Lee Hyun-jae, Ming Ren, Cynthia Sun, Jang Woo-hyuk, Kingdom Yuen, Benz Hui, Wang Duoduo, Liu Yang | Comedy | | |
| J U L Y | 15 | Quackerz | Viktor Lakisov | Michael Gross, Jesse Corti, Mark DeCarlo, Enn Reitel, Robbie Daymond | Drama / Comedy / Action / Animation | Russia-United States-Hong Kong co-production | |
| J U L Y | 15 | Tik Tok | Li Jun | Wallace Chung, Lee Jung-jae, Lang Yueting, Lee Chae-young | Drama / Mystery / Crime | | |
| J U L Y | 15 | When Larry Met Mary | Wen Zhang | Bao Bei'er, Song Jia, Zhu Yawen, Jiao Junyan, Guo Jingfei, Guo Tao, Ma Yili, Li Chen, Chen He, Chang Yuan, Bao Wenjing, Jiu Kong, Yu Shasha | Comedy / Romance | | |
| J U L Y | 15 | When Pen Ghost Meets Plate Ghost | Mo Sali | Kang Sung-goo, Shen Caier, Liu Xiaoqi, Yan Weier, Ding Yi, Xu Lin, Feng Han, Xu Jingyuan, Lin Xi, Yan Jiayin | Thriller / Horror | | |
| J U L Y | 20 | Yu Wang Sen Lin | Zhou Sansheng; Zhou Chongyang; Xiao Yuhang | Zhang Yongxian, Huang Shengliang, Zhang Chi | Drama | | |
| J U L Y | 21 | Skiptrace | Renny Harlin | Jackie Chan, Fan Bingbing, Johnny Knoxville, Eric Tsang, Michael Wong, Winston Chao, Eve Torres, Dylan Kuo, Shi Shi, Yeon Jung-hoon, Zhang Lanxin, Lily Ji, Tomer Oz, Temur Mamisashvili, Paul Philip Clark | Comedy / Action | Mainland-United States-Hong Kong co-production | |
| J U L Y | 21 | Summer's Desire | Lai Chun-yu | Huang Cancan, Him Law, Jerry Yan, Jiu Kong, Gua Ah-leh | Drama / Romance | | |
| J U L Y | 22 | Bobby the Hedgehog | Huang Jianming | Da Wei, Xiao Ming | Comedy / Animation / Adventure | | |
| J U L Y | 22 | Horror Love Story Wrong Way | Hong Shui | Mu Yuchen, Feng Ke, Gao Mingyang, Wei Peng, Zhang Suzhe, Chen Yuanyuan, Zheng Peilin, Sun Chengcheng, Li Gan, Zhang Yao | Suspense / Horror / Crime | | |
| J U L Y | 22 | One Night Only | Matt Wu | Aaron Kwok, Yang Zishan, Hao Lei, Andy On, Jack Kao, Zhou Yutong, Li Haofei, Jessie Li, Fan Tiantian | Romance | Mainland-Taiwan co-production | |
| J U L Y | 22 | Shao Nian Shi Ye Zhi Da Yu Bao Zang | Xiao Zhihui; Chen Lingchao | | Comedy / Animation | | |
| J U L Y | 22 | The Whisper | Peng Penghua | Jiang Wen, Yu Xiaowei, Zhang Yao, Zhang Xinyuan, Wang Xiaotian, Yan Guanying, Zhang Tianying, Yu Hewei | Suspense / Thriller / Horror | | |
| J U L Y | 29 | A Busy Night | Wang Li | Li Jing, Cao Yunjin, Ma Li, Cica Zhou, Lam Suet, Joy Sheng, Paul Chun | Comedy | | |
| J U L Y | 29 | At Cafe 6 | Neal Wu | Dong Zijian, Cherry Ngan, Austin Lin, Ouyang Nini, Ireine Song, Leon Dai, Sandrine Pinna | Drama / Romance | Mainland-Taiwan co-production | |
| J U L Y | 29 | Girl of the Big House | Aman Chang | Angela Wang, Francis Ng, Miriam Yeung, Jim Chim, Yuen Qiu | Comedy / Action | Mainland-Hong Kong co-production | |
| J U L Y | 29 | League of Gods | Koan Hui | Jet Li, Fan Bingbing, Huang Xiaoming, Angelababy, Louis Koo, Wen Zhang, Jacky Heung, Tony Leung Ka-fai, Zu Feng, Andy On, Xu Qing, Jordan Chan | Drama / Action / Fantasy | | |
| J U L Y | 29 | The Peaceful Island | Chang Yoon-hyun | Stanley Huang, Leon Dai, Jiao Junyan, Rayza, Huang Jian-wei, Wang Yanzhi, Sun Lei, Han Li, Zhang Chun, He Yujun | Action / Mystery / Adventure | Mainland-South Korea-Hong Kong co-production | |
| J U L Y | 29 | Yugo & Lala 3 | Wang Yunfei | Liu Xiaoyu, Meng Quanlin, Lu Kui, Baomu Zhongyang, Guo Zhengjian, Bai Xuecen, Liu Qianhan, Wang Linxi, Zhang Yutong, Deng Weifeng, Feng Sheng, Yang Tianxiang, Su Shangqing, Chen Liyang, Guo Haoran, Chen Meijun, Xie Yaxin, Han Xiao | Animation / Fantasy / Adventure | | |
| J U L Y | 29 | Toxic Poisoning | Cui Zhimin | Sun Haiying, Du Shuangyu, Yan Junxi, Sheng Shitou, Liu Changchun, Li Xiaoqiang | Comedy / Mystery / War | | |
| J U L Y | 29 | Warrant the Reborn | Zhou Xiaopeng | Zheng Qiang, Lu Enjie, Jiang Yiyi, Chen Weidong, Yu Menglong, Liu Zhenyou, Wang Gang, Li Yaojing | Suspense / Thriller / Horror | | |
| A U G U S T | 5 | My Best Friend's Wedding | Chen Feihong | Shu Qi, Feng Shaofeng, Victoria Song, Ye Qing, Rhydian Vaughan | Comedy / Romance | | |
| A U G U S T | 5 | The Golden Doll | Zhang Jiangnan | Han Xue, Sattawat Sethakorn, Wu Yixuan, Zhu Shengyi | Thriller | | |
| A U G U S T | 5 | Sweet Sixteen | Jo Jin-kyu | Kris Wu, Han Geng, Lu Shan, Bao Bei'er, Joo Won, Zhang Yao | Romance | Mainland-South Korea co-production | |
| A U G U S T | 5 | Time Raiders | Daniel Lee | Luhan, Jing Boran, Ma Sichun, Wang Jingchun, Zhang Boyu, Tu Shengcheng, Ngo Ka-nin, Philip Keung, Liu Weisen | Fantasy / Adventure | | |
| A U G U S T | 9 | Never Said Goodbye | Lin Yu-hsien | Zhou Dongyu, Lee Joon-gi, Ethan Juan, Rayza, Xing Jiadong, Yoo Sun, Tang Wang, Wang Zhizhi | Romance | | |
| A U G U S T | 11 | Line Walker | Jazz Boon | Nick Cheung, Louis Koo, Francis Ng, Charmaine Sheh, Hui Shiu-hung, Stefan Wong, Océane Zhu, Jade Leung, Li Guangjie, Zhang Huiwen | Drama / Action / Crime | Mainland-Hong Kong co-production | |
| A U G U S T | 12 | Call of Heroes | Benny Chan | Sean Lau, Louis Koo, Eddie Peng, Yuan Quan, Jiang Shuying, Wu Jing, Liu Kai-chi, Xing Yu, Berg Ng, Sammy Hung, Philip Keung | Action / Martial arts / Costume | Mainland-Hong Kong co-production | |
| A U G U S T | 12 | I Love That Crazy Little Thing | Snow Zou | William Chan, Tang Yixin, Jessica Jung, Nicholas Tse, Gillian Chung, He Jiong, Du Haitao, Mike Sui, Soinam Nima, Wang Ziqian, Seo In-guk, Sun Yi, Liu Xiaoqian, Nie Zaihao | Comedy / Romance | | |
| A U G U S T | 12 | Lost in Island | Wang Ziyuan | Li Miaoran, Zhang Luochen, Li Tianya, Xu Xiangying, Zhang Xiaoran, Liu Yuting, Jin Changliang, Zhang Lingyan, Guo Jian, Liu Zongwei, Zhang Yiqi, Wang Ziyuan | Drama / Comedy / Mystery / Thriller | | |
| A U G U S T | 12 | Love O2O | Zhao Tianyu | Angelababy, Jing Boran, Li Qin, Wang Sicong, Liu Xunzimo, Tan Songyun, Wu Qian, Li Xian, Cheng Yi, Jayden Wang, Bai Yu | Romance | | |
| A U G U S T | 19 | A Wishing Tree | Ankie Lau | Ankie Beilke, Carl Ng, Sabin Tambrea, Michelle Yim, Timmy Hung, Denise Keller, Dey Young, Audrey Landers, Lai Suen, Ankie Lau, Terence Yin, Jiang Wenli, Clifton Ko | Drama / Romance | | |
| A U G U S T | 19 | Bao Chi Chen Mo | Zhou Ke | Zhou Xun, Francis Ng, Zu Feng | Drama / Romance / Suspense | | |
| A U G U S T | 19 | Gui Zhou | Samm Chan | Anson Leung, Ye Lin, Gong Yuan | Suspense / Thriller | | |
| A U G U S T | 19 | Ji Xiang Bao Bao Zhi Wo Shi Shi Shen | Chen Suihua; Kang Xinchun; Zeng Peng | Ye Fang, Jiang Min, Cui Peng, Sun Ke, Zhuang Yuchi, Wang Yenan, Qi Xia, Wang Qi, Wang Xueqin, Wang Xin, Tang Dezong | Animation | | |
| A U G U S T | 19 | New Happy Dad and Son 2: The Instant Genius | He Cheng; Zhangzhen Yi | Liu Chunyan, Dong Hao, Ju Ping, Lin Yongjian, Lin Dajun, Jia Jie, He Ziran, Chen Su, Geng Chenchen, Huang Wei | Comedy / Animation / Family | | |
| A U G U S T | 19 | River At Far North | Zhang Xin | Ni Jingyang, Sun Song, Gao Yalin, Zheng Weili, Guo Dongwen, Wang Chu, Dong Hui, Zhang Enqi, Zhou Wen | Drama / Comedy | | |
| A U G U S T | 19 | Throne of Elves | Song Yuefeng | | Animation | | |
| A U G U S T | 19 | Qi Miao De Peng You Zi Meng Ai 2016 | John Cheung | Du Haitao, Guo Yan, Guo Taiyu, Jiang Chao, Xie Binbin, Lam Suet, Liu Xin, Ning Xiaohua, Philip Lau, Yeung Jing | Drama / Comedy | | |
| A U G U S T | 19 | Mid-July Days 2 | Li Hongjian | Chen Meixing, Zhai Zimo, Luo Xiang, Wang Liang, Zhao Ji, Miao Qing, Xia Xingling, Chang Yiran, Fu Man, Zhang Lifei, Zeng Yilian | Drama / Mystery / Thriller / Horror | | |
| A U G U S T | 19 | Ultimate Hero | Cui Lei; Dragon Chen | Dragon Chen, Alexandre Bailly, Luc Bendza, Zeddy Benson, Gian Derek, Warwica Gilles, Doug Babaru, Israel, Liu Yongqi, Yu Zhenhuan | Action / Crime / Adventure | Mainland-United States co-production | |
| A U G U S T | 25 | Di Tan Qi Qing | Li Ang | Wang Longzheng, Lu Chen, Li Haozhen, Wang Junping | Drama / Comedy / Romance | | |
| A U G U S T | 25 | Wu Wang Chu Xin | Yin Zhe | Purba Rgyal, Angel Wei, Cao Yang, Jiang Chao, Fang Qingzhuo | Drama / Comedy / Romance | | |
| A U G U S T | 26 | Crazy Crazy | He Zhonghua | He Zhonghua, Lei Zhenwei, Qiu Shiyou, Zhang Yuqian, Ren Xihong, Jia Ya | Comedy / Mystery / Crime | | |
| A U G U S T | 26 | Crying Out in Love | Kwak Jae-yong | Ou Hao, Zhang Huiwen, Yang Zi, Yao Lu, Wang Zhi, Gao Taiyu, Li Qinqin, Yang Tongshu, Liu Chao, Wen Xin, Deng Xin | Romance | | |
| A U G U S T | 26 | Dad's Cabin | Li Desheng | Du Yulu, Zhu Dan, Giulia Calovini, Jonathan Kos-Read, John Do, Zhang Ke, Zhou Xionghou | Drama | | |
| A U G U S T | 26 | Elanne Starlight | Wang Ziqi | Elanne Kong, Lu Yulin, Chen Zeyu | Drama / Romance | | |
| A U G U S T | 26 | The Haunted Graduation Photo | Jiu Jiu | Chen Yuan, Jin Guangmin, Liu Lier, Song Wei, Nie Jinglei, Chai Zidi, Li Qian, Liu Chonger | Thriller / Horror | | |
| A U G U S T | 26 | Mountain Cry | Larry Yang | Lang Yueting, Nick Wang, Chen Taishen, Yu Ailei, Guo Jin, Xu Caigen, Zhao Chendong, Li Siying, Zhang Zimu | Drama / Romance / Crime | Entered into the 20th Busan International Film Festival | |
| A U G U S T | 26 | Snow White and the Three Pigs | Sha Li | Ni Hongjie, Ren Zhihong, Gu Fangbing | Action / Animation / Adventure | | |
| A U G U S T | 26 | The Weird Bride | Wang Jian; Li Jizheng | Su Fei, Liu Qi, Rose Yang, Chen Guoliang, Wen Chunrong, Li Shihong, Yue Junling, Yu Tianchuan, Jia Shuyi, He Mingyu | Thriller | | |
| S E P T E M B E R | 1 | Change Life Style | Wen Deguang | Zhu Yuchen, Ding Liuyuan, Su Li, Zhao Liang | Drama | | |
| S E P T E M B E R | 2 | Battle of Cuju | Meng Weiguo | Sang Weilin, Wang Jing, Sun Chuanxin, Wang Yongdi, Ma Ziqi | Action / Romance / Sport | | |
| S E P T E M B E R | 2 | Days of Our Own | Joe Ma; Liu Hai | Zhao Liying, Qiao Renliang, Gui Gui, Van Fan, Ban Jiajia, Feng Mingchao | Drama / Romance | | |
| S E P T E M B E R | 2 | The Magic of Children: Magic Attack | Fang Xiaogang | Wu Yang, Chen Xu, Zhang Chao | Drama / Child / Fantasy | | |
| S E P T E M B E R | 2 | Wan Ming Ju Zu | Li Dewei | Wang Xiaohu, Mei Xue, Sun Bo, Bai Hezhen, Bai Yang, Yang Jun, Li Suyan | Suspense / Thriller / Horror | | |
| S E P T E M B E R | 2 | Who is Crying at Midnight | Lu Shilei | Liu Lier, Liu Yichen, Qin Liyang, Isabella, Chen Tianxin, Lu Ziru | Thriller / Horror | | |
| S E P T E M B E R | 3 | Zhong Er Bing Shao Nu Yao Zheng Jiu Shi Jie | Kulele | Wang Linyi, Zhang Meiqi, Wang Ruichang, Huang Jinshuai, Feng Xiaofeng, Wang Jinsong, Jiang Shimeng | Comedy | | |
| S E P T E M B E R | 8 | See You I See Me! | Xie Yihang | Du Haitao, Liu Xuan, Wu Xin, Danson Tang, Wang Wenwen, Kent Tong, Lee Kin-yan, Chen Zhixiong, Sun Dandan, Zheng Yihang | Action / Romance | | |
| S E P T E M B E R | 9 | A Woman in the Shadow | Zhang Kunyi | Wei Ni, Lu Lingjie, Na Renhua, Du Yuming, Li Longjun, Xu Siyu, Yang Kaidi | Suspense / Thriller | | |
| S E P T E M B E R | 9 | Crosscurrent | Yang Chao | Qin Hao, Xin Zhilei, Wu Lipeng, Jiang Hualin, Tan Kai, Wang Hongwei | Drama / Romance | Entered into the 66th Berlin International Film Festival | |
| S E P T E M B E R | 9 | For Love to Let Go | Luo Min | Kimmy Tong, Jiang Chao, Yu Menglong, Xie Binbin, Gao Taiyu, Wang Wei, Zheng Xiaoning, Wang Zhixia | Drama / Romance | | |
| S E P T E M B E R | 9 | Horrible Masion in Wild Village | Lu Shiyu | Kara Hui, Cai Juntao, Jia Lin, Tang Kuo-chung, Chen Yuaner | Suspense / Thriller | | |
| S E P T E M B E R | 9 | Mi Yue Ji Hua | Hao Ran | Oscar Sun, Chen Ran, Wang Yang, Wang Xuemin, Qi Chao | Comedy / Romance | | |
| S E P T E M B E R | 9 | Two Idiots | Chen Jian | Wang Wanzhong, Allen, Chang Yuan, Huang Shengyi, Zhao Liang, Yuan Feng, Peng Bo, Lei Han, Chen Sina, Chen Xiaolong, Kang Kang | Drama / Comedy / Romance | | |
| S E P T E M B E R | 13 | Silk Road Hero: Khan's Arrow | Yang Xiaopu; Fang Jun; Liu Quanwei; Zheng Xiaojia | Sookie Pan, Lu Nuo, Zhao Yuying, Su Guotao, Feng Bing | Drama | | |
| S E P T E M B E R | 14 | A Chinese Odyssey Part Three | Jeffrey Lau | Han Geng, Tiffany Tang, Wu Jing, Karen Mok, Zhang Juck, Zhang Yao, Wang Yibo, Gillian Chung, Xie Nan, He Jiong, Hu Jing, Huang Zheng, Jeffrey Lau, ho Seung-youn, Zhou Yixuan, Corey Yuen | Drama / Comedy / Fantasy | Mainland-Hong Kong co-production | |
| S E P T E M B E R | 14 | Cock and Bull | Cao Baoping | Liu Ye, Zhang Yi, Duan Bowen, Wang Ziwen, Tan Zhuo, Wang Yanhui, Yan Bei, Sun Lei | Drama / Comedy / Crime | | |
| S E P T E M B E R | 14 | Soul Mate | Derek Tsang | Zhou Dongyu, Ma Sichun, Toby Lee | Drama / Romance | | |
| S E P T E M B E R | 14 | Z Storm 2 | David Lam | Louis Koo, Julian Cheung, Vic Chou, Bowie Lam, Lo Hoi-pang, Shek Sau, Dada Chan, Derek Tsang, Janelle Sing, Deno Cheung, Gordon Lam, Philip Keung, Jacky Cai, Stephen Au | Drama / Crime | Mainland-Hong Kong co-production | |
| S E P T E M B E R | 15 | A Dog Named “Wang Zi” | Yang Jianwu | Zhong Jiaqi, Prince Chiu, Paw Hee-ching, Law Lan, Na Wei, Clara Lee, Peter Pang | Drama / Comedy | | |
| S E P T E M B E R | 15 | Ai De Xie Hou | Tommy Cui | Huang Shichao, Lyan Chen, Tse Kwan-ho, Grace Yu | Romance | | |
| S E P T E M B E R | 15 | Godbeast Megazord: Return of Green Dragon | Zhu Xiaobing; Huang Yiqing | | Animation | | |
| S E P T E M B E R | 15 | McDull: Rise of the Rice Cooker | Brian Tse | King Kong Lee, Da Wang, Zhang Zhengzhong, Peng Bo, Sun Xiaoniu | Comedy / Animation | Mainland-Hong Kong co-production | |
| S E P T E M B E R | 15 | My War | Oxide Pang | Liu Ye, Wang Luodan, Tony Yang, Ye Qing, Huang Zhizhong, Wang Longhua | Drama / History / War | | |
| S E P T E M B E R | 16 | The Match | Yan Xusheng | Wang Jingchun, Wang Sen, Bao Chunlai, Qiao Xin, Liu Xiaoguang, Rain Li, Xiao Yanbo, Wang Chaowei, Wang Huaxu, Wang Yizhe | Drama / Sport | | |
| S E P T E M B E R | 18 | The Grass in Wind | Luo Ying | Li Xinran, Li Huailong, Li Donghe, Chen Mengxi, Ban Lanqiao, Yang Deyu, Fu Hao, Ran Jinxing, Luo Deyuan, Wu Wen, Li Qiuping, Zhang Jiao | Drama / War | Entered into the 2015 Vancouver Chinese Film Festival | |
| S E P T E M B E R | 23 | Phoenix Valley | Kang Yujiang | Li Hongying, Dong Hanlu, Wong Yat-fei, Xia Jiawei, Bo Hong, Wang Shan, Wang Lu, Gai Xi | Comedy | | |
| S E P T E M B E R | 23 | Gui Meng Xiong Ling | Deng Andong | Alex Fong, Dany Lee, He Yingqiao, Liu Xiaodong, Wang Xintong | Suspense / Thriller / Horror / Crime | | |
| S E P T E M B E R | 23 | The Unvanished Vapour | Ryan He | Luo Lanshan, Wang Haochen, Pi Yijia | Drama | | |
| S E P T E M B E R | 23 | Three Idiots | Li Chunxiao | Liu Hua, Lai Xi, Yu Fei, Zhu Bo | Comedy | | |
| S E P T E M B E R | 29 | I Belonged to You | Zhang Yibai | Deng Chao, Bai Baihe, Yang Yang, Zhang Tianai, Yue Yunpeng, Du Juan, Liu Yan | Comedy / Romance | | |
| S E P T E M B E R | 30 | The Bell of Love | Piao Junxi | Wang Lan, Niu Ben, Luo Jingmin | Drama / Children | | |
| S E P T E M B E R | 30 | Ghost Hospital | Yin Guojun | Bianca Bai, Li Changxi, Law Kar-ying, Meng Peng | Thriller / Horror | | |
| S E P T E M B E R | 30 | L.O.R.D: Legend of Ravaging Dynasties | Guo Jingming | Fan Bingbing, Kris Wu, Chen Xuedong, William Chan, Amber Kuo, Yang Mi, Lin Yun, Yan Yikuan, Aarif Rahman, Wang Yuan, Wang Duo, Guo Jingming | Animation / Fantasy | | |
| S E P T E M B E R | 30 | Operation Mekong | Dante Lam | Zhang Hanyu, Eddie Peng, Sun Chun, Chen Baoguo, Feng Wenjuan, Liu Xiandazi, Zhao Jian, Wu Xudong, Carl Ng | Action / Crime | Mainland-Hong Kong co-production | |
| S E P T E M B E R | 30 | Xin Mu Ou Qi Yu Ji | Chen Lei | Zhang Yang, Ye Fang, Ding Yan | Comedy / Science Fiction / Animation / Adventure | | |

=== October–December ===
| Opening | | Title | Director | Cast | Genre | Notes | Ref. |
|---|---|---|---|---|---|---|---|
| O C T O B E R | 1 | I Am Nezha | Shu Zhan | Tao Dian, Han Jiaojiao, Liu Yao | Drama / Animation | | |
| O C T O B E R | 1 | Mind Decoding | Yu Xiangyuan; Ding Yingan | Jiang Fangting, Wen Jing, Yu Xiaochun | Drama / Suspense / Horror | | |
| O C T O B E R | 1 | Mission Milano | Wong Jing | Andy Lau, Huang Xiaoming, Wong Cho-lam, Michelle Hu, Nana Ou-yang, Xie Yilin, Shen Teng, Zhao Yingjun, Qi Wei, Xu Dongdong, Mao Junjie | Comedy / Action / Adventure | Mainland-Hong Kong co-production | |
| O C T O B E R | 1 | On the Way | Wang Xiaolong | Ma Qiguang, Hai Tong, Xiao Song, Bi Hui | Drama / Comedy / Love | | |
| O C T O B E R | 2 | Armor Hero Captor King | Zheng Guowei | Lai Yi, Wang Changchang, Qu Haojun | Action / Animation / Fantasy / Adventure | | |
| O C T O B E R | 3 | Feng Kuang Chou Xiao Ya | Jiang Yefeng; Zheng Chengfeng | Su Qianyun, Wang Xueqin, Yang Jin | Comedy / Animation / Children / Adventure | | |
| O C T O B E R | 4 | Xin Dong Fang Shen Wa | Yin Xiaodong | Wang Yanhua, Wang Xiaotong, Li Ye | Animation / Children | | |
| O C T O B E R | 9 | The Promise I Made to You | Lin Baisong | Yan Xiaopin, Zhang Jingsheng, Fei Xuan | Drama / Romance | | |
| O C T O B E R | 14 | Crossing Chishui He for Four Times | Lu Yi | Fang Cheng, Hu Xiaohui | Drama / Animation / War | | |
| O C T O B E R | 14 | Cupid Arrow | Ma Zhiquan; Gu Qiming | Hanson Ying, Zhao Yuanyuan, Jiro Wang | Comedy / Romance | | |
| O C T O B E R | 14 | Fall in Love | Ricky Lau | Stephanie Siao, He Gang, Gao Tian, Melissa Ma, Xu Fengbai, Bryan Leung, Zheng Ning, Zhang Chunnian, Zhou Haodong | Comedy / Romance | | |
| O C T O B E R | 14 | Super Model | Niu Hui | Zhu Yan, Ban Jiajia, Hou Jingwen | Drama / Romance | | |
| O C T O B E R | 14 | The Warriors | Ning Haiqiang | Ethan Li, Yu Xiaowei, Nie Yuan | Action / History / War | | |
| O C T O B E R | 14 | What's in the Darkness | Wang Yichun | Su Xiaotong, Guo Xiao, Lu Qiwei | Drama / Suspense / Crime | Entered into the 2015 First Film Festival | |
| O C T O B E R | 14 | Xiao Xiong De Xia Tian | Yang Ming | Jiang Chao, Chen Ting, Sun Guitian | Comedy / Children | | |
| O C T O B E R | 14 | Xin Yu Yang Guang | Lu Haotian | Li Jiaming, Li Jingyang, Biao Ma | Drama | | |
| O C T O B E R | 20 | Heartfall Arises | Ken Wu | Nicholas Tse, Sean Lau, Tong Liya | Drama / Action / Suspense / Crime | Entered into the 2016 Shanghai International Film Festival | |
| O C T O B E R | 21 | Flipped | Ma Yong | Kent Tong, Chiu Hao-chi, Zhang Xi-ai | Comedy / Romance | | |
| O C T O B E R | 21 | Lei Feng Man | Huang Jun | Ma Shi, Yang Ruifeng | Drama / Animation | | |
| O C T O B E R | 21 | Roommates in Love | Xie Jialiang | He Minghan, Cica Zhou, Kristy Yang | Comedy | | |
| O C T O B E R | 21 | So Lucky | Jia Yiping | Jia Yiping, Yuan Hong, Liu Yuxin | Comedy | | |
| O C T O B E R | 28 | The Loner | Guan Jin | Hideo Nakaizumi, Qi Zimei, Li Hua | Drama / War | | |
| O C T O B E R | 28 | Mr. Donkey | Zhou Shen; Liu Lu | Ren Suxi, Da Li, Liu Shuailiang | Comedy | | |
| O C T O B E R | 28 | Mysterious Face II | Zhao Xiaoxi | Zhao Huixian, Tian Jiada, Hu Rui | Thriller / Horror | | |
| O C T O B E R | 28 | The Nursery | Patchanon Thammajira | Zhu Yilong, Jill Hsu | Thriller / Horror | Mainland-Thailand co-production | |
| O C T O B E R | 28 | Xiaoming and His Friends | Wang Xin | Qiao Shan, Xu Juncong, Fei Weini | Comedy | | |
| N O V E M B E R | 3 | Looking For the Holy Land | Zhang Li | Nuobu Tuga, Tao Duoduo | Drama / Romance / Mystery / Adventure | | |
| N O V E M B E R | 4 | Hi Jack | Wu Tiange | Chen Shu, Jin Weiheng, Zeng Chen | Comedy / Action / Romance | | |
| N O V E M B E R | 4 | Hide and Seek | Liu Jie | Wallace Huo, Qin Hailu, Wan Qian, Jessie Li, Dong Zijian | Drama / Suspense / Horror | | |
| N O V E M B E R | 4 | Making Family | Cho Jin-mo | Aarif Rahman, Kim Ha-neul, Mason Moon Moorhouse | Drama / Comedy / Romance | Mainland-South Korea co-production | |
| N O V E M B E R | 4 | Never Give Up | Jiang Qinmin | Yuan Chenjie, Cao Yunjin, Elanne Kong | Drama / Comedy / Romance | | |
| N O V E M B E R | 4 | Scary Notes | Min Jintao | Zhao Yongxin, Tan Jianci, Feng Jiamei, Pan Chunchun | Thriller / Horror | | |
| N O V E M B E R | 4 | Shadow | Wan Shizhong | Liu Haowen, Liu Junfeng, Lv Jia, Zhang Zhiwei | Suspense / Thriller / Martial arts / Costume | | |
| N O V E M B E R | 4 | Someone to Talk To | Liu Yulin | Mao Hai, Li Qian, Liu Bei | Drama / Romance / Family | | |
| N O V E M B E R | 4 | The Song of Cotton | Zhu Yuancheng | Yan Bingyan, Wang Deshun, Ai Liya | Drama | Entered into the 2016 Shanghai International Film Festival | |
| N O V E M B E R | 4 | Xiao Lin Zu Qiu | Lam Chi-chung | Shin, Zhou Qiqi, Louis Cheung | Comedy / Sports | | |
| N O V E M B E R | 9 | The Light | Huang Yan; Ma Lin | Wei Daxun, Xu Lu, Mao Chuan | Drama / Comedy / Romance | | |
| N O V E M B E R | 9 | Sheng Si 96 Xiao Shi | Yuan Benli | Nie Yuan, Ye Qianyun | Drama / War | | |
| N O V E M B E R | 10 | Escape Route | Wu Lin | Zhang Yishan, He Yunwei, Li Jing, Park Ha-sun | Comedy / Action | | |
| N O V E M B E R | 10 | Poor Rich Dad | Alfred Cheung | Kevin Cheng, Xiao Xiao-bin, Li Chengyuan, Annie Liu | Drama / Comedy / Romance | Mainland-Hong Kong co-production | |
| N O V E M B E R | 11 | The Bride With Painted Skin | Mo Sali | Ding Huiyu, Yin Guoer, Xu Qianjing | Thriller / Horror | | |
| N O V E M B E R | 11 | Desingle Bible | Yue Lei | Jin Jia, Guo Tongtong, Ye Zixuan | Comedy / Romance | | |
| N O V E M B E R | 11 | Ge Li Dao | Xu Bin | Zhang Yishan, Ding Ding, Zhu Yongteng | Romance / Suspense | | |
| N O V E M B E R | 11 | I Do Want My Money Back | Zhang Tong | Jiang Yisheng, Gao Chuan, Jia Yina | Comedy / Romance / Crime | | |
| N O V E M B E R | 11 | Scandal Maker | Ahn Byeong-ki | Tong Dawei, Michelle Chen, Lü Yuncong | Drama / Comedy | Mainland-South Korea co-production | |
| N O V E M B E R | 11 | Xiong Di Zhi Bei Piao Ge Shou | Wang Zi | Shi Haozheng, Liu Jialan, Liao Wang | Drama / Action / Romance | | |
| N O V E M B E R | 12 | Last Testimony | Wang Shanyu | Ma Shihong, Isabella Wu, Zhang Kaixuan | Drama | | |
| N O V E M B E R | 15 | Haut-Brion | Cao Limin | Sun Lihua, Liang Yu, Liang Jialing | Drama / Romance | | |
| N O V E M B E R | 18 | Bai Yun Qiao | Zhong Xuan | Zhong Xuan, Deric Wan, Liu Yuting | Suspense / Thriller | | |
| N O V E M B E R | 18 | Intrude The Widow Village at Midnight | Xing Bo | Yu Menglong, Daniella Wang, Guo Yan | Suspense / Thriller | | |
| N O V E M B E R | 18 | I Am Not Madame Bovary | Feng Xiaogang | Fan Bingbing, Guo Tao, Da Peng | Drama / Comedy | Entered into the 2016 Toronto International Film Festival | |
| N O V E M B E R | 18 | The Warriors Gate | Matthias Hoene | Mark Chao, Ni Ni, Uriah Shelton | Fantasy / Adventure | Mainland-France co-production | |
| N O V E M B E R | 18 | Wu Lin Tan Mi | Yu Xiaopeng | | Action / Documentary | | |
| N O V E M B E R | 18 | The Youth's Entrepreneurial Dream | Wang Yu | Leng Mo, Long Meizi, Bryan Leung | Drama / Children | | |
| N O V E M B E R | 25 | An Flying Arrow | Gao Feng | Cheng Zining, Zhang Yulong | Action / Romance / Adventure | | |
| N O V E M B E R | 25 | Lost in Vietnam | Guo Xiang | Joe Ma, Wang Dazhi, Liu Liyang | Comedy / Romance / Adventure | Mainland-Vietnam co-production | |
| N O V E M B E R | 25 | Land of Hero | Cui Zhimin | Zou Dejiang, Lu Qianwen, Zhang Yu | Drama / War | | |
| N O V E M B E R | 25 | Min & Max | Ma Kan | Godfrey Gao, Wang Shuilin, Fan Tiantian, Kong Jiu | Comedy / Romance | | |
| N O V E M B E R | 25 | Pali Road | Jonathan Lim | Michelle Chen, Henry Ian Cusick, Jackson Rathbone | Romance / Suspense | Mainland-United States co-production | |
| N O V E M B E R | 25 | Perfect Imperfection | Chen Bing | Ady An, Ahn Jae-hyun, Alex Fong | Drama / Romance | | |
| N O V E M B E R | 25 | Sky on Fire | Ringo Lam | Daniel Wu, Zhang Ruoyun, Zhang Jingchu | Action / Suspense | | |
| N O V E M B E R | 25 | Soul House | Zhou Guangxing | Ni Xinyu, Chen Meixing, Na Wei | Thriller | | |
| D E C E M B E R | 1 | My Love | Xie Yunpeng; Du Changbo | Zheng Hao, Zhang Moxi, Ke Yiwen | Drama / Romance / Suspense | | |
| D E C E M B E R | 2 | Ghost | Li Kai | Lou Qi, Yang Kaidi, Xie Bo | Horror / Fantasy | | |
| D E C E M B E R | 2 | Pot is Iron | Bao Qiang | Du Xudong, Xu Huanshan, Wang Liyun | Comedy | | |
| D E C E M B E R | 2 | Prince Orient House | Zuo Weichen | Yao Yi, Du Qiao, Chen Xiangcheng | Drama / Action / Science fiction | | |
| D E C E M B E R | 2 | Sha Mo Zhi Xin | Li Ke | Sui Yongliang, UNA, Xue Qi, Li Lei | Drama / Romance / Adventure | | |
| D E C E M B E R | 2 | Super Express | Song Xiao | Chen He, Song Ji-hyo, David Belle | Comedy / Action | Mainland-South Korea-France co-production | |
| D E C E M B E R | 2 | Sword Master | Derek Yee | Lin Gengxin, Peter Ho, Jiang Yiyan, Jiang Mengjie, Paw Hee-ching, Gu Caobin | Drama / Action / Martial arts / Costume | filming started April 21, 2014 | |
| D E C E M B E R | 2 | Yellow River Aria | Gao Feng | Li Yu, Li Meng, Ren Shan | Drama | | |
| D E C E M B E R | 6 | 48 Hours | Guo Kuiyong | Li Tianye, Li Wan'er, Cheng Shuang | Comedy | | |
| D E C E M B E R | 9 | A Teenage Basketball Diary | Gao Yang | Zhao Qiang, Gao Xiangyu, Sun Jie, Peng Jing | Drama / Romance / Sports | | |
| D E C E M B E R | 9 | Foolish Plan | Seng Dao | Jordan Chan, Deng Jiajia, Jiro Wang | Drama / Comedy / Crime | | |
| D E C E M B E R | 9 | Rescripts Bout Peony Fairy | Peng Jun | Yuan Fei, Huang Zhen, Guo Fengzhou | Romance / Fantasy | | |
| D E C E M B E R | 9 | Room 704 | Liu Shuqiao | Su Xiaoming, Zhang Yishan, Fu Mei, Sun Yan | Drama / Romance / Suspense / Thriller | | |
| D E C E M B E R | 9 | Somewhere Connected | Chen Chong | Ai Wei, Wang Zhigang, Zhou Dexin, Gao Guang | Drama | | |
| D E C E M B E R | 9 | Suddenly Seventeen | Zhang Mo | Ni Ni, Wallace Huo, Ma Su, Darren Wang | Comedy / Romance / Fantasy | | |
| D E C E M B E R | 9 | Tharlo | Pema Tseden | Shide Nyima, Yangshik Tso | Drama | Entered into the 72nd Venice International Film Festival | |
| D E C E M B E R | 16 | Blood of Youth | Yang Shupeng | Ou Hao, Zhang Yi, Yu Nan | Suspense / Crime | | |
| D E C E M B E R | 16 | Five Besties: Divorce Busting | Chen Jianfei | Li Sirui, Liu Sitong, Melissa Wang | Comedy / Romance | | |
| D E C E M B E R | 16 | Flying Girl | Tao Hai | Yuan Hong, Jiang Bingjie, Zhou Mujie, Ju Renxi | Romance / History / Costume | | |
| D E C E M B E R | 16 | The Great Wall | Zhang Yimou | Matt Damon, Willem Dafoe, Pedro Pascal, Andy Lau, Zhang Hanyu, Eddie Peng, Luhan, Huang Xuan, Lin Gengxin, Ryan Cheng, Cheney Chen, Jing Tian, Karry Wang, Yu Xintian | Suspense / Thriller | United States-China co-production | |
| D E C E M B E R | 16 | Masters in Forbidden City | Xiao Han | Wang Jin, Qi Haonan, Qu Feng | Documentary | | |
| D E C E M B E R | 16 | My Circle of Friends | Yu Yang | Xiao Shenlong, Jin Zhenghao, Zhu Yaxuan, Yu Yang | Comedy | | |
| D E C E M B E R | 16 | The Wasted Times | Cheng Er | Ge You, Zhang Ziyi, Tadanobu Asano, Gillian Chung, Du Chun, Ni Dahong, Yuan Quan, Yan Ni, Zhao Baogang, Han Geng, Huo Siyan, Wallace Chung, Eric Wang, Du Jiang, Lv Xing | Drama / Mystery | Mainland-Hong Kong co-production | |
| D E C E M B E R | 16 | This is Life | Chen Weijun | Li Jiafu, Xia Jinju, Chen Xiaofeng, Zeng Xianchun | Documentary | | |
| D E C E M B E R | 17 | Four Warriors | Liu Bangbang; Sun Youshu | Xu Kang, Zhu Rongrong | Comedy / Animation / Children / Fantasy / Adventure | | |
| D E C E M B E R | 18 | Spring of the Life | Xu Hong | Kong Xiangcheng, Gu Yu, Wang Jingteng, Chen Yunpeng | | | |
| D E C E M B E R | 18 | Survivor | Yang Tao | Chen Wanglin, Ken Lok, Liu Yidan | Disaster | | |
| D E C E M B E R | 18 | Sweet of the Song | Ma Ning | Chai Hao, Lu Qianwen, Fan Jintao | Drama | | |
| D E C E M B E R | 23 | Lost Minds | Chen Weier | Jian Renzi, Andrew Lin, Hui Shiu-hung, Pat Ha, Kathy Yuen | Thriller | | |
| D E C E M B E R | 23 | Railroad Tigers | Ding Sheng | Jackie Chan, Huang Zitao, Wang Kai, Darren Wang | Comedy / Action | | |
| D E C E M B E R | 23 | See You Tomorrow | Zhang Jiajia | Tony Leung Chiu-Wai, Takeshi Kaneshiro, Eason Chan, Angelababy, Sandrine Pinna | Comedy / Romance | Mainland-Hong Kong co-production | |
| D E C E M B E R | 23 | The Writing's on the Wall | Shi Yingjie | Zhang Yamei, Dong Borui, Daniel Yan, Wang Cheng, Cui Jing | Romance / Suspense / Crime | | |
| D E C E M B E R | 24 | My Super Girl | Lin Chen; Xu Xiaowen | Zhao Miao, Yuan Dongdong, Liu Hui, Shao Hanjun, Zhu Chidan | Comedy / Romance | | |
| D E C E M B E R | 29 | One Dream About Love | Hu Che | Lai Xi, Nai Wen, Zhang Xue | Drama / Comedy | | |
| D E C E M B E R | 29 | Provoking Laughter | Tang Xu | Pan Yueming, Archie Kao, Chang Yuan | Comedy / Crime / Adventure | | |
| D E C E M B E R | 30 | Cherry Returns | Chris Chow | Song Jia, Gordon Lam, Cherry Ngan, Hu Ge | Suspense | Mainland-Hong Kong co-production | |
| D E C E M B E R | 30 | The Insanity | Rao Xiaozhi | Wan Qian, Zhou Yiwei, Wang Zijian | Drama / Comedy / Suspense | | |
| D E C E M B E R | 30 | Some Like It Hot | Song Xiaofei; Dong Xu | Xiao Yang, Yan Ni, Xiaoshenyang | Comedy | | |
| D E C E M B E R | 30 | Three Weddings | Jingle Ma | Dong Jie, Zhang Liang, Sun Qian | Comedy / Romance / Family | | |
| D E C E M B E R | 30 | Unforgettable Jin Yin Tan | Liang Zi | Wang Yi, Zhai Jia, Ru Xue | Romance / War | | |
| D E C E M B E R | 31 | She's From Another Planet | Ye Ming; Lin Yunxiang | Wen Zhuo, Zou Yang, Cao Xiyue | Comedy / Romance / Fantasy | | |
| D E C E M B E R | 31 | Super Kindergarten | Jiang Yefeng | Ding Yan, Wang Xueqin, Wang Xin | Animation | | |

== See also ==
- List of Chinese films of 2015
- List of Chinese films of 2017
