= Chang Chen Ghost Stories =

Chang Chen Ghost Stories may refer to:

- Chang Chen Ghost Stories (2015 film), a Chinese suspense thriller film
- Chang Chen Ghost Stories (2016 film), a Chinese romance horror thriller film
