= Magic Mountain (TV series) =

- Genre: Children's
- Created by: Ron Saunders; Claire Henderson; Yu Pei Xia
- Written by: Claire Madsen; Libby Gleeson; Richard Tulloch; David Evans
- Directed by: Paul Faint; Ian Munro; David Evans; Di Drew
- Starring: Helen Dallimore; Steve J. Spears; Cornelia Frances; Anthony Ackroyd
- Composer: Peter Dasent
- Countries of origin: China; Australia
- Original languages: Mandarin; English
- No. of episodes: 52

Production
- Cinematography: Chen Chen
- Running time: 10 minutes
- Production companies: Australian Broadcasting Corporation; Southern Star Entertainment; China Central Television

Original release
- Network: ABC TV
- Release: 3 June 1997 – 24 November 1998

Magic Mountain (Chinese: 神奇山谷; pinyin: shénqí shāngǔ) is a live-action children's television program broadcast on ABC TV on the ABC For Kids broadcasting block from 1997 to 1998 and on China Central Television in China. It was released on VHS, but there has been no DVD release yet. It is a full-body puppet series aimed at children aged two to five years. The series was repeated on ABC TV until 13 February 2004. It was repeated in China until 2013. The ABC's Magic Mountain website was removed during September 2010 when the new ABC Kids website was introduced.

== Production ==
The series was produced in China, with both a Chinese and Australian English dub in mind. Much of the crew is Chinese. It was produced by the Australian Broadcasting Corporation, China Central Television and Southern Star Entertainment. Production took place between 1997 and 1998. The series has been dubbed into Spanish and Portuguese, Arabic and Hebrew, among many other languages. The program was also screened in the UK on Nick Jr, TVO in Canada, TVNZ 2 in New Zealand and TVP 1 in Poland.

== Summary ==
Magic Mountain follows the adventures of four creatures of China; Dragon, Lion, Panda and Tortoise. Dragon lives in a cave, and is wise, with magical powers that often get the others out of trouble. Lion is playful, full of ideas and is constantly getting into mischief, Panda is vain, but smart, and Tortoise is a motherly figure, always looking out for the others and trying to help them. These four creatures "enjoy wonderful times as they invent unusual games, play tricks on each other, and have exciting adventures as they explore their enchanting world."

== Cast ==
Australian version
Character	Actor
Dragon (voice)	Anthony Ackroyd
Lion (voice)	Steve J. Spears
Panda (voice)	Helen Dallimore
Tortoise (voice)	Cornelia Frances

Chinese version
Character	Actor
Dragon (voice)	Sun Yuebin
Dragon (body)	Wang Chunguang/Jiang Tao
Lion (voice)	Li Lihong
Lion (body)	Li Yanmiao/Zhang Chunyu/Wang Xianhua
Panda (voice)	Liu Chunyan
Panda (body)	Xu Xiangyang
Tortoise (voice)	Wang Lihua
Tortoise (body)	Zuo Xiangfeng

== Episodes ==
=== Series 1 ===
1. Dragon Loses His Magic (3 June 1997) – Dragon is helping Panda tidy her house. But he blows the house tidy a bit too much and he loses his magic! Panda, Lion and Tortoise do their best to get his magic back until Tortoise comes up with an idea: sing a get well Dragon song. After that, his magic comes back and he is a magic dragon again!
2. Doctor Lion (12 August 1997)
3. Flying Panda (13 August 1997)
4. Invisible Lion (14 August 1997)
5. Runaway Cart (15 August 1997)
6. Tortoise's Restaurant (18 August 1997)
7. Lion Moves House (19 August 1997)
8. Sports Day (20 August 1997)
9. Princess Panda (21 August 1997)
10. Monster in the Night (22 August 1997)
11. The Hollow Tree (25 August 1997)
12. Surprise Party (26 August 1997)
13. Panda's Midnight Feast (27 August 1997)
14. Dragon Sneezes (28 August 1997)
15. Secret Apple Tree (29 August 1997)
16. Explorers (1 September 1997)
17. Dragon's Treasure (2 September 1997)
18. Territories (3 September 1997)
19. The Robber (4 September 1997)
20. Very Fast Tortoise (5 September 1997)
21. Emergency Rescue (8 September 1997)
22. Upside Down Tortoise (9 September 1997)
23. Double Panda (10 September 1997)
24. Panda Loses Her Memory (11 September 1997)
25. Lion Circus (12 September 1997)
26. Hide and Seek (15 September 1997)

=== Series 2 ===
1. The Dare (20 October 1998)
2. It's Raining, It's Pouring (21 October 1998)
3. Brave Prince Lion (22 October 1998)
4. Dragon Gives Up Flying (23 October 1998)
5. Panda Club (26 October 1998)
6. A Sticky Situation (27 October 1998)
7. Lion's Night Time Fun Fair (28 October 1998)
8. Lion's New Friend (29 October 1998)
9. Panda The Ballerina (30 October 1998)
10. Bedtime Story (2 November 1998)
11. Runaway Lion (3 November 1998)
12. Treasure Map (4 November 1998)
13. Weather Magic (5 November 1998)
14. Three Wishes (6 November 1998)
15. Dragon's Birthday (9 November 1998)
16. Magnifico (10 November 1998)
17. Tortoise The Hero (11 November 1998) – When Tortoise sees Panda playing a hero adventure game, she wants to join in the fun too. But Panda won't let her. Lion and Dragon decide to help by getting pretend strife, so that Tortoise can rescue them to prove herself a hero. But only when Panda gets into real trouble, does Tortoise get the chance to be a hero?
18. A House For Tortoise (12 November 1998)
19. Dropping In (13 November 1998)
20. The Swap (16 November 1998)
21. Missing Friends (17 November 1998)
22. Dragon's Apprentice (18 November 1998)
23. Let's Stick Together (19 November 1998)
24. Stop Tricking Panda (20 November 1998)
25. Cousin Dragon (23 November 1998)
26. The Return of Cousin Dragon (24 November 1998)

== Release ==
All releases consist of 4 or more episodes packaged together. None of the second series has been released outside of China. The complete series of 52 episodes was once available on VCD in China.

=== VHS (Australia) ===
- Magic Mountain: Flying Panda – 1997
- Magic Mountain: Princess Panda – 1997
- Magic Mountain: Surprise Party – 1998
- Magic Mountain: Dragon's Treasure – 1999
- Magic Mountain: Hide and Seek – 1999

== Other media ==
A 31-page paperback colouring book based on the series was released in March 1999. A storybook titled Tortoise the Hero was published in April 2000. There was also some rare plushes from 1999.
