= Go Go Club =

Chinese boy band

- Born: China
- Occupation(s): Singers, actors
- Years active: 2007-present

Chinese name
- Traditional Chinese: 兄弟聯
- Simplified Chinese: 兄弟联
Transcriptions
- Musical career
- Origin: China
- Genres: Mandopop
- Labels: Gold Typhoon
- Members: Zhong Kai; Chen Zeyu; Mao Fangyuan
- Past members: Wu Diwen
- Website: www.woo.com.tw

Go Go Club is a Chinese boy band under management of SMG Dong Fang Zhi Xing. While originally consisting of four members, the current group members are Zhong Kai (simplified Chinese: 钟凯; traditional Chinese: 鍾凱), Chen Zeyu, Mao Fangyuan (simplified Chinese: 毛方圆; traditional Chinese: 毛方圓) . The height of all members is 188 cm.

They rose to fame after competing in the Chinese idol TV show, 2006 My Hero (simplified Chinese: 06加油！好男儿; traditional Chinese: 06加油！好男兒). In 2007, Go Go Club released their first EP, 漫长的约会, and then released a first album, 兄弟联同名专辑.

== Discography ==
漫长的约会

- Released: February 01, 2007
- Label: EMI
- Tracks: 2
1. 漫长的约会
2. 漫长的约会(Seoul Remix)

兄弟联同名专辑

- Released: April 6, 2007
- Label: EMI
- Tracks: 10
1. 暗号
2. 永远都会在
3. 疼你一辈子
4. 因为是你
5. 想和你一起
6. 挥手
7. 烫
8. 再见你的温柔
9. 我的爱很小
10. 漫长的约会

FIGHTING 4 LOVE! 爱的大作战

- Released: September 9, 2009
- Label: Gold Typhoon
- Tracks: 4
1. 爱的雷达
2. 给你我的爱
3. 又怎样
4. 夏恋

== Filmography ==
=== Films ===
- 2009 Pleasant Goat and Big Big Wolf

=== Television ===
- 2007 My Prince(青蛙王子)
- 2008 The Prince of Tennis
- 2009 Armor Hero(铠甲勇士)
- 2009 The Prince of Tennis 2(加油！网球王子)

== Bibliography ==
- September 28, 2007: GO GO SAIPAN EXPOSURE (青春拍立得) (Photobook)
