= Sze Yu =

Chinese-born Australian badminton player, presenter and actor

Sze Yu 施羽
- Born: 30 September 1962 (age 64); Shanghai, China
- Occupations: actor, television presenter, badminton player (retired)
- Spouse: Teng Hsiu-ping (m. 1992)
- Children: 1
- Parent: Sze Ning On (father)

Chinese name
Transcriptions
Standard Mandarin
- Hanyu Pinyin: Shī Yǔ
Yue: Cantonese
- Jyutping: Si^{1} Jyu^{5}

Sze Yu (born 30 September 1962) is a Chinese-born Australian actor, television presenter and retired badminton player.

As a badminton player, he represented both Hong Kong and Australia. In the 1980s, he was one of the top players in the world.

He started his acting career in Taiwan, while still a badminton player. He has since acted in over 60 TV dramas in Taiwan and mainland China.

== Athletic career ==
Sze Yu 施羽
Personal information
- Years active: 1980–1989
- Height: 5 ft 11 in (1.80 m)

Sport
- Country: Hong Kong (1982–84); Australia (1986–89)
- Sport: Badminton
- Handedness: right
Medal record
Representing Australia
Commonwealth Games
| Silver medal – second place | 1986 Scotland | Men's Singles |
| Bronze medal – third place | 1986 Scotland | Mixed Team |

Sze Yu's father Sze Ning On was a Chinese Indonesian badminton player who in 1955 arrived in China to play for the China national badminton team (which at that time was completely made up of Chinese Indonesians). He married Sze Yu's mother, a teacher at the Central Academy of Drama, in Beijing, later moving the family to Shanghai where Sze Yu was born. Sze Yu started seriously playing his father's sport at age 9.

In 1979, the Sze family settled in British Hong Kong and Sze Yu soon distinguished himself as the top player in the territory. In September 1983, his family immigrated to Australia for his education. Despite having become an Australian citizen, Sze still represented Hong Kong in the 1984 Thomas Cup as he had not met the 2-year residency requirement to represent Australia.

Representing Australia, Sze received 2 medals at the 1986 Commonwealth Games. He was also named to the Australian 1986 Thomas Cup team but an injury kept him away from the competition. He did play at the 1988 Thomas Cup for Team Australia, coached by his father.

=== IBF World Grand Prix ===
The World Badminton Grand Prix sanctioned by International Badminton Federation (IBF) from 1983 to 2006.

Men's singles
| Year | Tournament | Opponent | Score | Result |
|---|---|---|---|---|
| 1984 | Swedish Open | (Denmark) Jens Peter Nierhoff | 3–15, 15–10, 12–15 | (silver) Runner-up |
| 1985 | Scottish Open | (Denmark) Torben Carlsen | 8–15, 15–3, 15–13 | (gold) Winner |
| 1985 | World Grand Prix Finals | (China) Han Jian | 6–15, 3–15 | (silver) Runner-up |
| 1986 | Chinese Taipei Open | (Indonesia) Icuk Sugiarto | 4–15, 17–14, 15–5 | (gold) Winner |
| 1986 | Indonesia Open | (Indonesia) Icuk Sugiarto | 6–15, 6–15 | (silver) Runner-up |
| 1986 | Carlton Inter-sport Cup | (Denmark) Poul-Erik Høyer Larsen | 15–2, 14–17, 11–15 | (silver) Runner-up |
| 1986 | English Masters | (Denmark) Morten Frost | 8–15, 5–15 | (silver) Runner-up |
| 1987 | Carlton Inter-sport Cup | (England) Nick Yates | 11–15, 15–6, 15–10 | (gold) Winner |
| 1988 | Canada Open | (England) Steve Butler | 15–7, 10–15, 5–15 | (silver) Runner-up |
| 1988 | U.S. Open | (Indonesia) Lius Pongoh | 11–15, 15–5, 17–16 | (gold) Winner |

=== Team Competitions ===
| Country Represented | Year | Event | Team | Rank |
|---|---|---|---|---|
| Hong Kong | 1982 | Asian Games | Men's team | |
| Hong Kong | 1982 | Commonwealth Games | Mixed team | |
| Hong Kong | 1984 | Thomas Cup | Men's team | Qualification round |
| Australia | 1986 | Commonwealth Games | Mixed team | 3 |
| Australia | 1988 | Thomas Cup | Men's team | Qualification round |
| Australia | 1989 | Sudirman Cup | Mixed team | 16 |

== Acting career ==
In 1989, while nursing an injury in Taipei, Taiwan, where his father took over the Chinese Taipei national badminton team a year prior, Sze Yu was invited by Liu Li-li, a television director, to participate in her TV drama Wanjun, written by the creator Chiung Yao. Liu was taking a team from Chinese Television System to Beijing to create the first-ever Taiwanese TV drama filmed in mainland China. Under the encouragement of his mother, a Beijing native, Sze took on the supporting role of Zhou Shuhao. The series proved massively popular throughout the Chinese-speaking world, and Sze, after winning the Australian International in the same year, decided to retire to pursue an acting career.

Today, Sze is still active in television, mostly in mainland China.

== Filmography ==
=== Film ===
| Year | English title | Chinese title | Role | Notes |
|---|---|---|---|---|
| 1993 | 18 | | Wu Sheng | |
| 1993 | Top Cool | 想飛～傲空神鷹 | physician | |
| 2016 | Elanne Starlight | 爱在星空下 | Ziyan's father | |

=== TV dramas ===
| Year | English title | Chinese title | Role | Notes |
|---|---|---|---|---|
| 1990 | Wan-chun | 婉君 | Zhou Shuhao | |
| 1991 | Long Time No See Friend | 朋友好久不見 | Wang Hsiao-wei | |
| 1991 | The Flying Fox of Snowy Mountain | 雪山飛狐 | Fu Kang'an | |
| 1992 | Green is the Grass by the River | 青青河邊草 | | |
| 1992 | Unforgettable | 意難忘 | | |
| 1992 | Legends of Liu Po-wen | 劉伯溫傳奇 | Zu Zhencai | |
| 1993 | Dream of the Red Chamber | 紅樓夢 | Jiang Yuhan | |
| 1993 | Justice Pao | 包青天 | Emperor Renzong of Song | later episodes |
| 1994 | The Seven Heroes and Five Gallants | 七俠五義 | Emperor Renzong of Song | |
| 1994 | Overlord Flower | 霸王花 | Ji Wei | |
| 1994 | Wong Fei-hung and Thirteenth Aunt | 黃飛鴻與十三姨 | Qian Zhihao | |
| 1994 | The World Shares the Moment | 天涯共此時 | Yu Guoqing | |
| 1995 | The Burning Sun | 燃燒的太陽 | | |
| 1995 | Dui Dui Hu | 對對糊 | | |
| 1995 | Ghostly Legends | 天師鍾馗 | | several characters |
| 1996 | Guan Gong | 關公 | Lu Su | |
| 1996 | Real Love is Forever | 真愛一世情 | Chiang Yung-chuan | |
| 1996 | Perfect Score for Husband | 老公一百分 | | |
| 1996 | Taiwan Paranormal Events | 台灣靈異事件 | | several characters |
| 1997 | Mobilization Order of the Gods | 神仙動員令 | black bear | |
| 1997 | Lily in the Wind | 風中百合 | Meng Fan | |
| 1997 | Kangxi's Love in the Palace | 康熙情鎖金殿 | Mingzhu | |
| 1997 | The Crazy Film Studio | 攝影棚也瘋狂 | Tseng Hao | |
| 1997 | 4 Daughters | 四千金 | Hsia Ta-yu | |
| 1997 | Taiwan Independence Members | 台獨份子 | | |
| 1997 | The Strange Cases of Lord Shih | 施公奇案 | | several characters |
| 1998 | The Legend of Earth God | 土地公傳奇 | Civil Judge | |
| 1999 | A Pair of Swallows | 燕雙飛 | Lan Tien-yu | |
| 2000 | Return of Judge Bao | 包公出巡 | Fang Dayou | |
| 2000 | Lucky and Happy Every Year | 吉祥如意年年來 | Qin Laishi | |
| 2000 | Princess Huaiyu | 懷玉公主 | Tu Dehai | |
| 2000 | The Colour of Money | 金钱本色 | Ling Wenle | |
| 2002 | Eighteen Arhats | 十八羅漢 | Liu Zichen | |
| 2002 | The Sky of Age 18 | 十八岁的天空 | Lan Feilin's father | |
| 2002 | Wang Yaqiao, the Top Assassin | 第一殺手王亞樵 | Hou Biao | |
| 2003 | Lady Wu: The First Empress | 至尊紅顏 | Duan Changde | |
| 2004 | The Flower Spirit | 花姑子 | Taoist Priest | |
| 2005 | My Way | 起跑天堂 | Lu Tou | |
| 2005 | Endless Love | 天若有情 | Zhou Dashan | |
| 2005 | The Cricket Master | 蟋蟀大師 | | |
| 2006 | Stepmom | 春天後母心 | Zhang Baode | |
| 2006 | Wrongfully Accused | 媽媽無罪 | Duan Jiaxiang | |
| 2007 | Justice Department | 青天衙門 | Bao Daode | |
| 2007 | Coming Home | 烽火孤兒 | Yan Tai | |
| 2007 | Lost the Way | 迷路 | Wu Chengjun | |
| 2007 | Strange Stories from a Chinese Studio | 聊齋 | Jia De | Season 2 |
| 2008 | Dad, Wake Me Up at Dawn | 爸爸天亮叫我 | Zhao Ade | |
| 2008 | Jianghu Brothers | 江湖兄弟 | Huang Dawei | |
| 2008 | Sentimental Woman and Obsessed Man | 多情女人癡情男 | Jin Haobai | |
| 2008 | 8 Avatar | 八仙全傳 | Zhongli Quan | |
| 2009 | Youth in War | 戰火中青春 | Cui Haotian | |
| 2009 | Who Understands the Hearts of Women | 誰懂女兒心 | Yu Zhixing | |
| 2010 | Journey to the West | 西遊記 | Taibai Jinxing | |
| 2010 | The Romance of Jianghu | 江湖絕戀 | Mr. Zhong | |
| 2010 | Wolf | 野狼 | You Li | |
| 2011 | 3S Lady | 单身女王 | Zhang Chengxin | |
| 2011 | Tears of the Bride | 流淚的新娘 | Ge Renjie's father | |
| 2011 | Breaking the Thorn | 斷刺 | Zhou Xushan | |
| 2011 | Fallen Leaves in Chang'an | 叶落长安 | Jianping | |
| 2012 | The Sinister Love of Mother and Son | 血雨母子情 | Meilin | |
| 2012 | A Tottering Life | 飄搖人生 | Cui Heyan | |
| 2012 | Precious | 千金 | Ling Mutian | |
| 2012 | Her Whole Life | 她的一生 | Zhong Bo | |
| 2013 | To Advance Toward the Victory | 向著勝利前進 | Tairashuu Yokoyama | |
| 2013 | League of Legends | 英雄聯盟 | General Yamada | |
| 2015 | Master of Destiny | 風雲天地 | Kwong Kwan-ho | |
| 2016 | Love and Passion | 萬水千山風雨情 | Gao Youde | |
| 2016 | Golden Bloody Path | 黃金血道 | Pang Dekun | |
| 2016 | Behind the Secret | 秘密的背後 | Dong Shijun | |
| TBA | Lasting Affection | 爱让我们在一起 | Wang Guxian | |
| TBA | Blind Date | 盲约 | Xia Tian's father | |
