= Elanne Starlight =

- Poster
- Chinese: 爱在星空下
- Directed by: Wang Ziqi
- Starring: Elanne Kong; Lu Yulin; Ye Xinchen; Chen Zeyu; Joe Ma; Anne Heung; Sze Yu
- Production company: Shanghai Wangziqi Media
- Distributed by: Pearl River Pictures
- Release date: August 26, 2016
- Running time: 90 minutes
- Country: China
- Language: Mandarin
- Box office: CN¥1.7 million

Elanne Starlight is a 2016 Chinese romantic drama film directed by Wang Ziqi and starring Elanne Kong, Lu Yulin, Ye Xinchen, Chen Zeyu, Joe Ma, Anne Heung and Sze Yu. It was released in China by Pearl River Pictures on August 26, 2016.

== Plot ==
Super idol Su Xing met Sun Xiaoai, a hot-tempered girl from a small town. Afterwards, Sun Xiaoai mistakenly believed the sweet words of her cousin Julie and became Su Xing's personal nanny. As they spent time together day and night, Sun Xiaoai discovered many unknown sides of Su Xing. He sponsored out-of-school children, cared for sick fans, and would rather bear the infamy to preserve his sister's reputation. These actions made Sun Xiaoai fall in love with him unknowingly. However, Su Xing was framed by Julie and others and lost everything overnight. Sun Xiaoai stood behind him and never left. Su Xing bravely faced adversity and was determined to return to his original intention and start as a qualified actor. Sun Xiaoai also took on the important task of an agent, and the relationship between the two heated up in their struggle. Su Xing won praise in the industry for his workaholic status. His past negative image was replaced by his dedicated and diligent attitude. His return work helped him return to the peak of his career. In the end, Su Xing deservedly won the title of Best Actor, and his love with Sun Xiaoai also blossomed.

== Cast ==
- Elanne Kong
- Lu Yulin
- Ye Xinchen
- Chen Zeyu
- Joe Ma
- Anne Heung
- Sze Yu
- Zhong Kai
- Wu Jinxi

== Reception ==
The film grossed CN¥1.7 million at the Chinese box office.
