= Chen Xiaofeng =

Chinese painter

- 陳嘯風
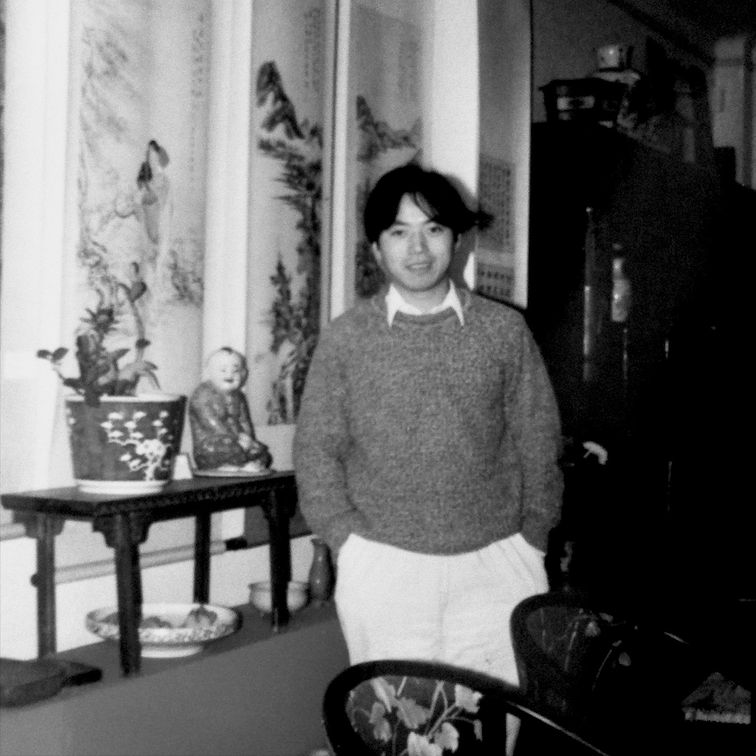
- Born: Chen Wuyong; Pujiang, Zhejiang
- Known for: Painting

Chinese name
- Traditional Chinese: 陳嘯風
- Simplified Chinese: 陈啸风
Transcriptions
Standard Mandarin
- Hanyu Pinyin: Chén Xiàofēng
- Wade–Giles: Ch'en Hsiao-feng

Chen Xiaofeng (Chinese: 陳嘯風; pinyin: Chén Xiàofēng), born Chen Wuyong (Chinese: 陳武勇), pseudonyms Nanshan Daoren (Chinese: 南山道人), Xianhua Shanren (Chinese: 仙華山人), is a Chinese painter, calligrapher and scholar of the new Zhe School.

== Life ==
Chen was born in Pujiang, Zhejiang. In his early childhood, Chen studied Ren Bonian, Wu Changshuo, Zhang Shuqi, Wu Fuzhi, Zheng Zuwei and other paintings from local squire in Pujiang. In his youth, he went to Hangzhou and studied with Professor Wu Shanming, and then studied at Nankai University. In 1988, he founded the Youth Art Society, and from 1989 to 1990, he was the president of the Hushu Society in Hangzhou; in 1995, he was one of the founders of Dazhen National Institute that media described as "Three Masters of Qiantang". Chen was elected the President of Wulin Academy of Arts in 2002 and taught as the visiting professor of Nanchang Institute of Technology.

== Artworks ==
Many of Chen's artworks were figure paintings and paintings of landscape that incorporate the characteristics of both the Southern and Northern schools.

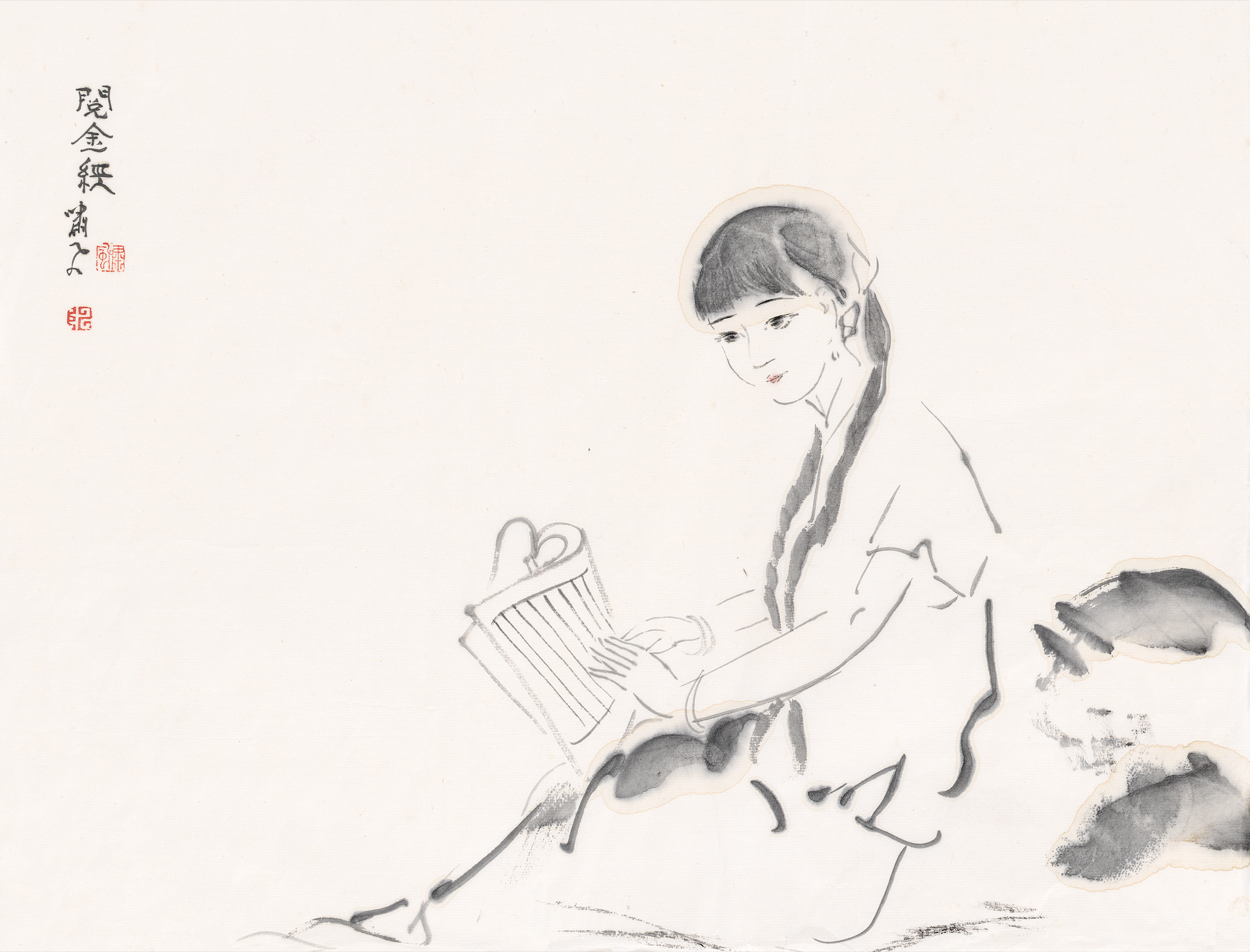
Chen Xiaofeng, Reading the Golden Sutras

== Sources ==
- The Paintings of Chen Xiaofeng, Culture and Art Publishing House ISBN 978-9-8818-3251-1
- China National Knowledge Infrastructure. "Chen Xiaofeng". Chronicle, CNKI. Archived from the original on 2020-12-27.
