= Wulin Academy of Arts =

Art institution in Hangzhou, China

- 武林書畫院
- Formation: 1995; 31 years ago
- Type: Honorary society and independent research institute
- Headquarters: Hangzhou, Zhejiang, China.
- President: Chen Xiaofeng
- Website: www.wulin.ac.cn

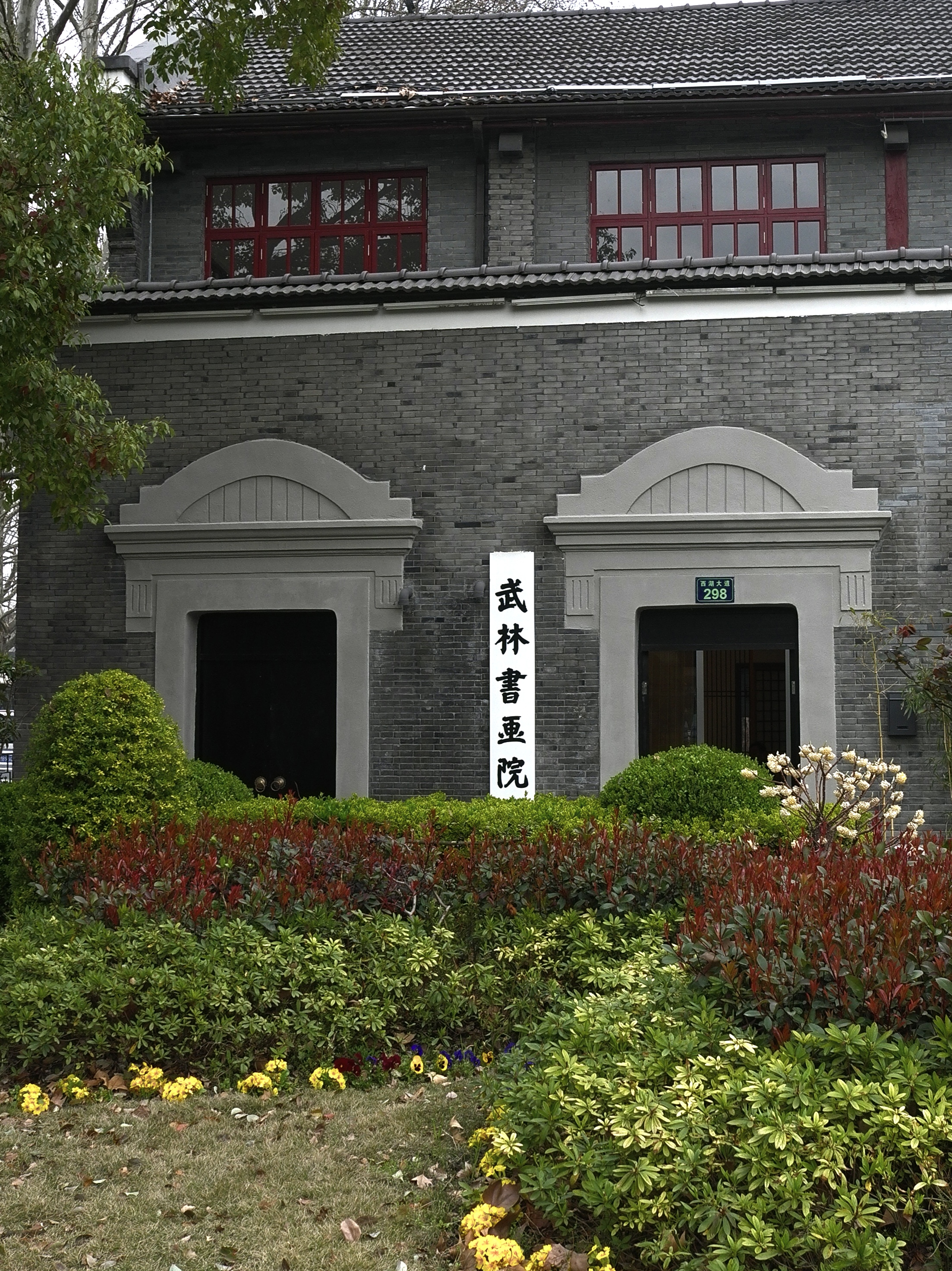
Jinglian Hall, Wulin Academy of Arts

The Wulin Academy of Arts (Chinese: 武林書畫院) is a learned society and independent research institute for Chinese arts and culture studies, located on the shores of the West Lake in Hangzhou, Zhejiang Province. The academy was named after Wulin, the ancient name of Hangzhou. It was founded in 1995 but, with antecedents dating back to the Southern Song dynasty.

== History ==
From the 1980s, a group of artists and scholars from China Academy of Art, Zhejiang University, Nankai University and Xiling Seal Art Society had discussed the idea of forming an independent institution for Chinese arts and culture studies that echoes to the Imperial Art Academy (御前畫院) founded by Emperor Gaozong 800 years ago on the lakeside of Wulin (the ancient name of Hangzhou), and also, reconnecting to the Wulin School that was founded in the Ming dynasty by Lan Ying.

In April 1989, Ms. Zhang Songying, the founder of the Wulin Academy of Arts, raised funds and went to Hangzhou to contract for the operation of Hangzhou Hushu Society of Arts, laying the foundation for the establishment of the Academy. In 1995, with the financial support of Hangzhou Hushu Society of Arts, The Dazhen National Institute was established at the antechamber of the Imperial Wenlan Library on the island of Solitary Hill (孤山) as the predecessor of Wulin Academy. In 1997, the archaeological excavation and restoration at the Imperial Library began and the Institute moved out, cooperated with the Government of Gongshu District and merged into Hangzhou Hushu Society of Arts. In the same year, members of Dazhen Institute established the Hangzhou Meilan Society of Arts to operate independently of the government. The influence of the Meilan Society had grown for rebuilding the disintegrated tradition of Chinese art that had been greatly damaged by the havoc of the New Culture Movement in the 1910s and ten years' Cultural Revolution. In 2000, the government suspended Meilan Society's cultural operation license for 'political' reasons to suppress independent cultural studies and some of its members fled to Europe and America for extrication.

On May 13, 2002, the former Dazhen National Institute, Hangzhou Hushu Society of Arts and Hangzhou Meilan Society of Arts formally merged and renamed to Wulin Academy of Arts. In 2006, the academy relocated to the shores of West Lake where its first institute was established.

== Research institutes ==
Wulin Academy of Arts covers three major academic divisions:

Painting, calligraphy and epigraphy

- Institute of Chinese Painting
- Institute of Chinese Calligraphy
- Centre for Epigraphic Studies

Chinese Studies and music

- Institute of Chinese Classical Studies
- Centre for Guqin Studies

Architecture, mural and sculpture

- Institute of Chinese Architecture
- Institute of Chinese Mural
- Institute of Chinese Sculpture

== Activities ==
- Guqin Concert at Wulin Academy
- Spring and Summer Activities
- Wulin Academy and Zhejiang Provincial Sports Bureau jointly established the Art Institute of Zhejiang Provincial Sports Bureau
