= When the Meteor Shot Across the Sky =

- Poster
- Chinese: 当流星划过天际
- Directed by: Song Qi
- Starring: Xu Nuo; Sun Lihua; Liang Yu; Yang Xiaorong
- Production company: Hailaiwu Entertainment Development
- Distributed by: Beijing Jinyi Qiankun Entertainment
- Release date: June 17, 2016
- Running time: 97 minutes
- Country: China
- Language: Mandarin
- Box office: CN¥5.2 million

When the Meteor Shot Across the Sky is a 2016 Chinese romantic drama film directed by Song Qi and starring Xu Nuo, Sun Lihua, Liang Yu and Yang Xiaorong. It was released in China by Beijing Jinyi Qiankun Entertainment on June 17, 2016.

== Plot ==
Wei Lan and Yin Jun'en met on a rainy day, and a series of romantic stories gradually attracted each other. He Feiran vaguely discovered the feelings between the two. He loved Wei Lan deeply and didn't know how to advance or retreat. In order to keep Jun'en's heart, Tian Ling used a trick to force Wei Lan to retreat. After several emotional entanglements, Jun'en lost 1/3 of his memory, and those lost memories were thrown into the corner like fallen leaves. Because of a misunderstanding, Wei Lan and Jun'en missed each other.

Two years later, time has passed. Although the scenery is the same, some feelings have changed. The only thing that remains unchanged is the feeling in Wei Lan's heart, just for the same reason: the person she has never forgotten; with the support and help of He Feiran, Wei Lan slowly walked out of the shadow of the past, and the amnesiac Jun'en also returned to China with his parents and Tian Ling to prepare for his engagement ceremony with Tian Ling.

The four met again and reopened the wheel of fate.

== Cast ==
- Xu Nuo
- Sun Lihua
- Liang Yu
- Yang Xiaorong

== Reception ==
The film grossed CN¥5.2 million in China.
