= Zhang Lei (actor) =

Chinese actor

- Born: Zhang Lei; December 20, 1972 (age 52); Ürümqi City, Xinjiang Province, China
- Occupation: Actor
- Years active: 2001-present

Chinese name
- Traditional Chinese: 張磊
- Simplified Chinese: 张磊
Transcriptions
Standard Mandarin
- Hanyu Pinyin: zhāng lěi
- Website: http://blog.sina.com.cn/yanyuanzhanglei

Zhang Lei (born 20 December 1972), is a Chinese actor best known for his role as "journalist Ga Yu" in the 2004 Movie Kekexili: Mountain Patrol film by Chinese director Lu Chuan (陆川). He is currently an artist of National Theatre Company of China - NTCC (中国国家话剧院).

== Early life ==
Zhang was born in Ürümqi City, Xinjiang Province, China. He graduated from the Department of Stage Arts at the Central Academy of Drama in 1999.

== Career ==
In 2003, Zhang take his role as Ga Yu in the film Kekexili: Mountain Patrol filmed by Chinese director Lu Chuan (陆川) based on true events. Kekexili: Mountain Patrol is more or less told from the point of view of Ga yu, an ambitious young journalist from Beijing whose idea to report on the mountain patrol may just end up being his last. During the filming, Zhang and the crew faced a life challenge, just like the characters in the film. Zhang once told a reporter "I couldn't stand the pain of the AMS in the beginning and dreamt about going back home every day. It took me one whole month to get used to everything, and now I just wanted to complete my work well."

After Kekexili, Zhang embarked on a number of television series, most of which had a Chinese civil war theme.

== Filmography ==
=== Film ===
Year	Title	Role	Notes
2003	Kekexili: Mountain Patrol 可可西里	Ga Yu	
2004	Nu Jiang Hun 怒江魂	Li Qi	
2004	You Yu De Zao Chen 阴郁的早晨	Song Ji Gang	
2010	Tie Xue Dan Xin Deng Yan Da 铁血丹心邓演达	Chiang Kai-shek	
2013	Guan Guan Ju Jiu 关关雎鸠	Zhuang Meng Chen	
2016	Love Studio 同城邂逅		

=== Television ===
Year	Title	Role	Notes
2002	Zhong Guo Gui Dao 中国轨道	Sun Wei	
2002	Ren Ren Dou Shuo Wo Ai Ni 人人都说我爱你	Lu Dao	
2003	Zheng Fu 征服	Wang Kai	
2005	A You Zheng Zhuan 阿有正传	Liu Yuan	
2005	Give the Decisive Word 一言为定	Mo Ran	
2006	Dao Ke Dao 道可道	Lin Yuan Yue	
2006	Ju Ji 狙击	Liu Tao	
2006	Bao Mi Ju De Qiang Sheng 保密局的枪声	Lin Xiao Chen	
2006	Memory City 记忆之城	Zhou Guan Jie	
2007	Han Wei 捍卫	Du Jie	
2007	Rouge Snow 胭脂雪	Qiu Gui San	
2008	Hei Bai Ren Sheng 黑白人生	Li Bin Liang	
2008	Healing Souls 人生有明天	Zhao Zi Chen	
2009	Eye Pupil 深瞳	Jiang Hu Sheng	
2009	Sha Hu Kou 杀虎口	Qian Jia Hao	
2010	Xinan Jiazu 新安家族	Cheng Tian Song	
2010	Di Lei Zhan Chuan Qi Zhi Chu Jian Xing Dong 地雷战传奇之锄奸行动	Liu Zhen Tang	
2011	Da Shang Dao 大商道	Wu Biao	
2011	Dao Feng Luan Shi Qing 刀锋乱世情	Hua Yang Sheng	
2013	Nan Shao Lin Zhi Dang Wo Ying Hao 南少林之荡倭英豪	Lin Zhan Xiang	
2013	The Extremely Danger 势不两立	Ma Hai Long	
2014	China Police 803 中国刑警803	Inspector Chen	
