= Sweet of the Song =

- Poster
- Chinese: 甜水谣
- Directed by: Ma Ning
- Starring: Chai Hao; Lu Qianwen; Fan Jintao; Ma Guoxin
- Production company: Beijing Maoguang Brothers Entertainment
- Distributed by: Beijing Honghe Pinshang Media
- Release date: 18 December 2016
- Running time: 1:30:00
- Country: China
- Language: Mandarin
- Box office: CN¥2.4 million

Sweet of the Song is a 2016 Chinese romantic drama film directed by Ma Ning and starring Chai Hao, Lu Qianwen, Fan Jintao and Ma Guoxin. It was released in China by Beijing Honghe Pinshang Media on 18 December 2016.

== Plot ==
It tells the story of the literary and artistic workers in Yan'an during the Second Sino-Japanese War. Under the baptism of war and the guidance of the spirit of the Yan'an Literature and Art Symposium, they created a series of works that served the workers, peasants, and soldiers, enriched the cultural life of the military and civilians in the base areas, and greatly played the role of literature and art in the Anti Japanese War. Located in a small village called Kushuihao in the Maowu Desert, Liu Chunsheng, a successful businessman, returned to his hometown after a long absence. He came here to fulfill his wish to dig a sweet water well for the land that nurtured him and the villagers who drank bitter water for generations. He also came to pay tribute to a lost love in his youth.

== Cast ==
- Chai Hao
- Lu Qianwen
- Fan Jintao
- Ma Guoxin

== Reception ==
The film has grossed CN¥2.4 million in China.
