= Wenlan Pavilion =

Library and garden in Hangzhou, China

Coordinates: 30°15′11″N 120°08′18″E

- Simplified Chinese: 文澜阁
- Traditional Chinese: 文瀾閣
Transcriptions
Standard Mandarin
- Hanyu Pinyin: Wénlán Gé

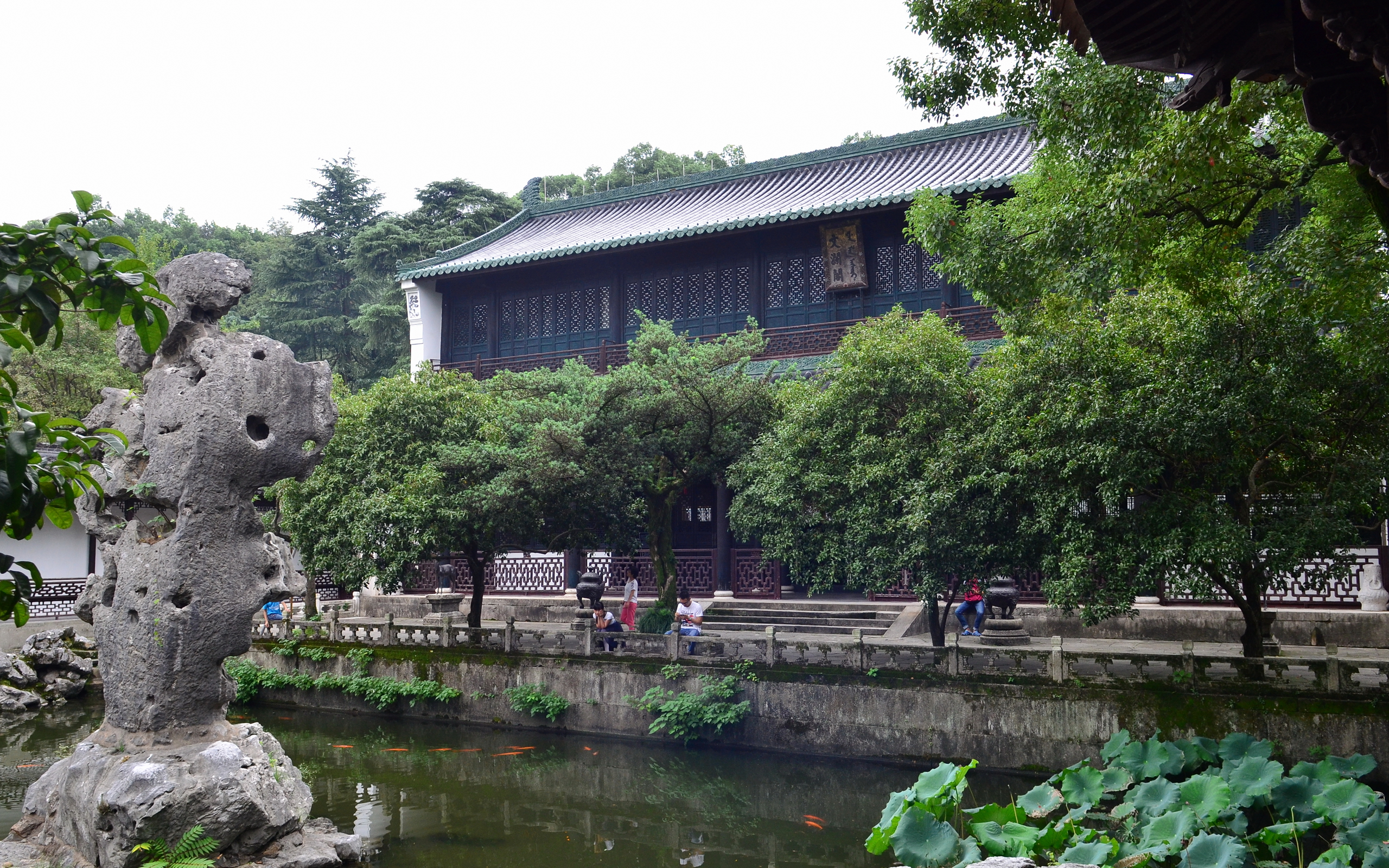
Wenlan Pavilion

The Wenlan Pavilion (Chinese: 文瀾閣), also known as the Imperial Wenlan Library, Imperial Library or Wenlan Ge, is a library and garden located in Hangzhou, Zhejiang Province, China. The library was one of the seven major collections of books built by the Qianlong Emperor of the Qing dynasty to house the Siku Quanshu and the only surviving one among the southern collections.

== History ==
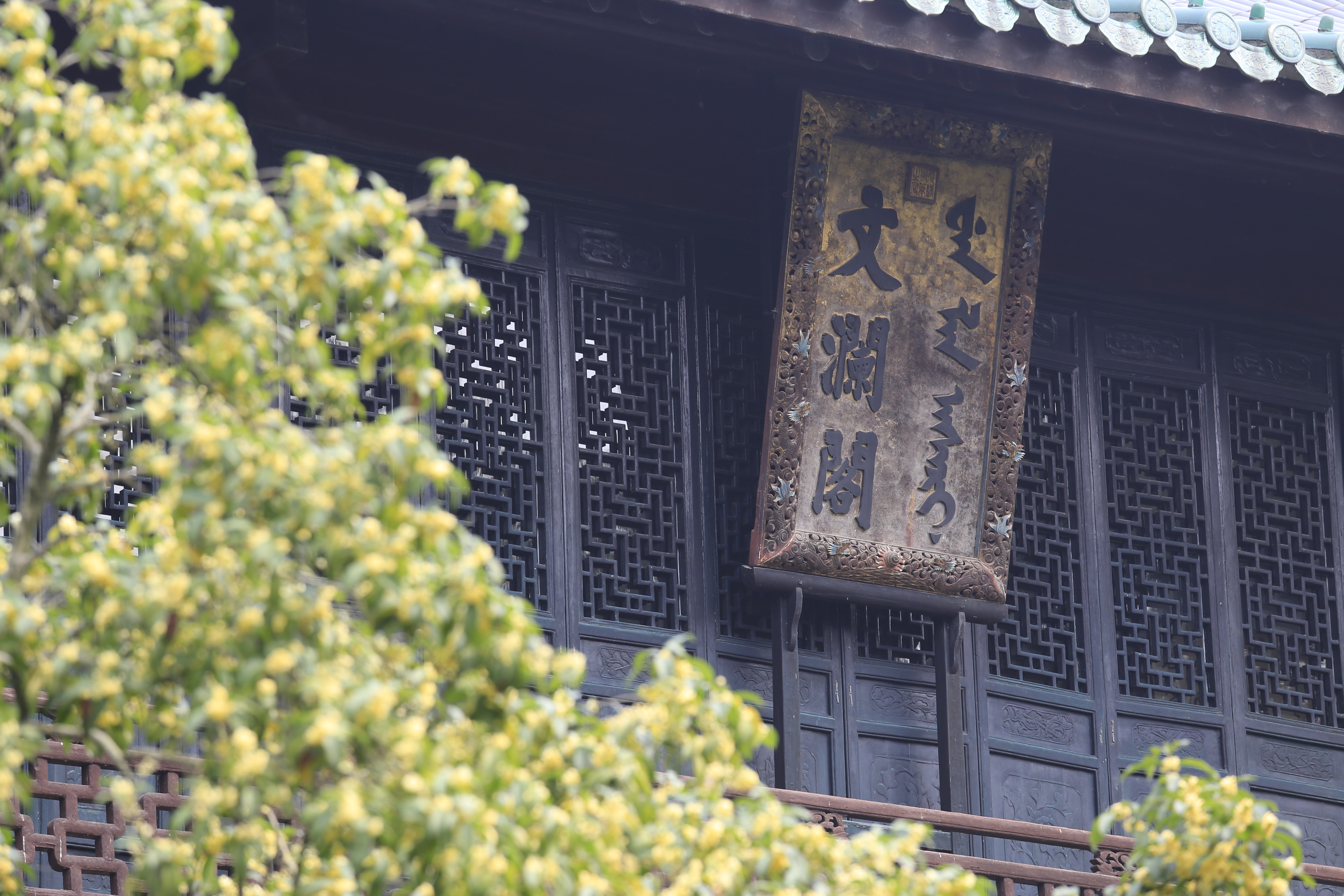
Signboard of Wenlan Library

The Wenlan Pavilion was built in 1782 (47th year of the Qianlong reign of the Qing dynasty) and completed in the following year. In 1853, Zhenjiang Wenzong Mansion and Yangzhou Wenhui Mansion were both destroyed by the Taiping Rebellion and were not restored after the war, but Wenlan Library collapsed in 1861 when the Taiping Army captured Hangzhou and was rebuilt in 1880. The Imperial Library is a typical Chinese garden in the centre of the West Lake.

It has a large gate facing the lake, followed by a flowery corridor, and through the rocky mountain cave you can see the imperial chambers. In the middle of the pond is the two-storey library building. On the eastern axis is the Luohan Hall and the Qing Dynasty Scholar's Residence Exhibition Hall which was rebuilt in 2009.

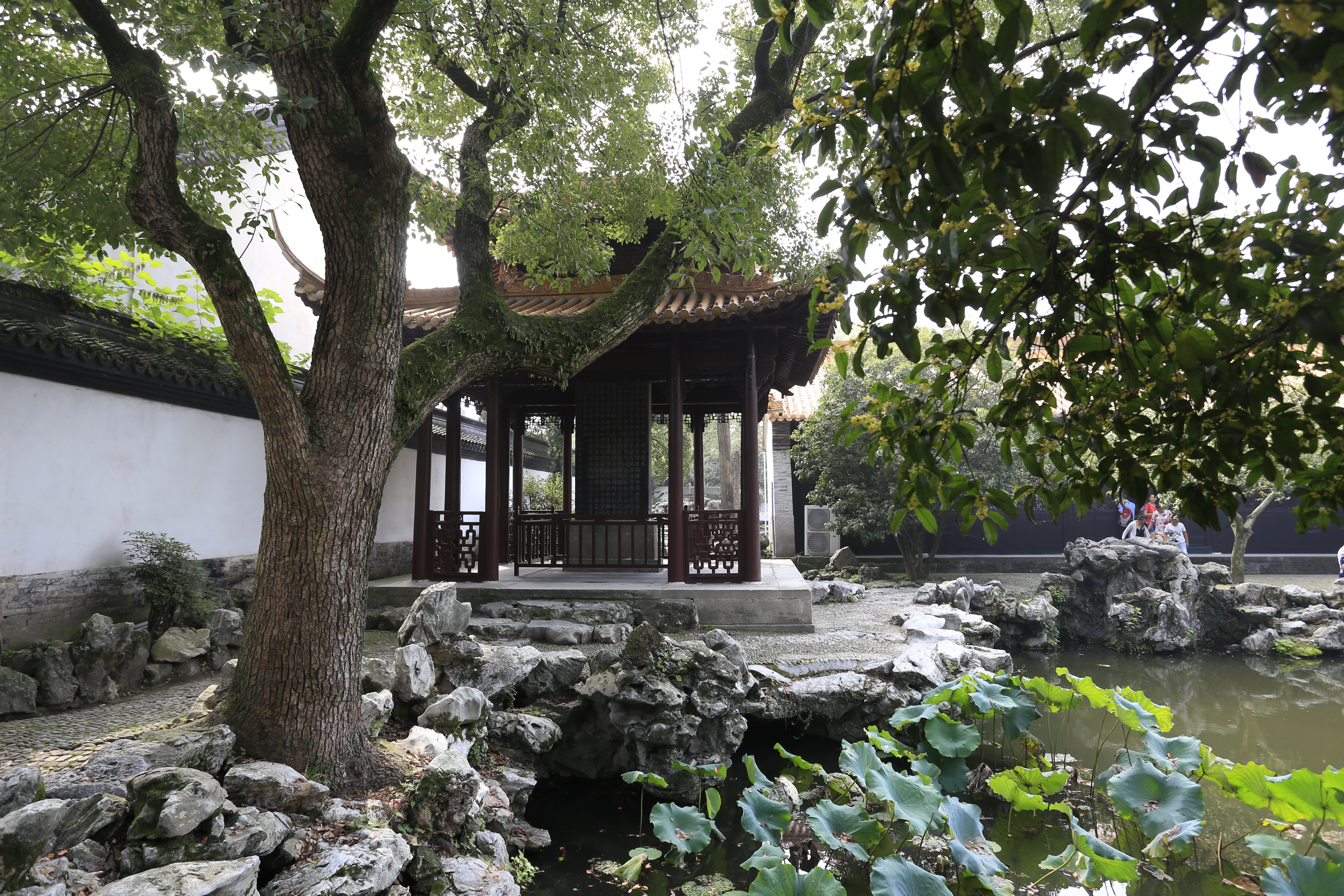
Wenlan Library Gardens

== See also ==
- List of Chinese gardens
- List of libraries in China
