= Love Studio =

- Poster
- Chinese: 同城邂逅
- Directed by: Cheng Zhonghao; Wang Kai
- Production companies: Shanghai Kaiyi Entertainment; Hao Long (Shanghai) Film; Shanghai Haoying Media; Shanghai Xinghu Pictures; Huawen (Shanghai) Film; Xunli Pictures (Shanghai); Kunshan Fangzhou Advertising Media
- Distributed by: Shanghai Kaiyi Entertainment
- Release date: 11 March 2016
- Running time: 95 minutes
- Country: China
- Languages: Mandarin; English
- Box office: CN¥1 million

Love Studio (Chinese: 同城邂逅) is a 2016 Chinese romance comedy film directed by Cheng Zhonghao and Wang Kai. It was released in China by Shanghai Kaiyi Entertainment on 11 March 2016.

== Plot ==
Yun Fan ( by Jiang Chao), who has had a lot of relationship experience, and a few friends who are also very good at love and have a lot of relationship experience set up a love agency that specializes in helping single customers with their relationship problems. Their main job description is to provide help to men and women who can't fall in love and don't know how to pursue love. They help customers to change their image, tell them how to communicate with their beloved and create a good atmosphere when they confess their love, etc. They also help customers to change their image, tell them how to communicate with their beloved and create a good atmosphere when they confess their love. In addition, they help single customers enter the “love base camp” by customizing solutions based on their knowledge of the person they are pursuing.

In the process of advising customers on love, Yunfan met a customer who could significantly influence the development of the company. He discovers that the girl the client is pursuing is his ex-girlfriend Wang Yan (Cica Zhou), whom he has never been able to forget.

== Cast ==
- Jiang Chao
- Cica Zhou
- Li Meng
- Yu Menglong
- Mandy Lee
- Zhang Lei
- Qi Em
- Hei Ge

== Reception ==
The film has grossed CN¥1 million at the Chinese box office.
