= Li Gan =

Chinese-American neuroscientist

- Education: Yale School of Medicine (PhD); Peking University (BS)
- Known for: Pathogenic tau acetylation; Microglia in neurodegeneration
- Scientific career
- Fields: Neuroscience
- Workplaces: Weill Cornell Medical College
- Doctoral advisor: Leonard K. Kaczmarek
- Other academic advisors: Gerald Fischbach; Lennart Mucke
- Website: labs.gladstone.org/gan/index.html

Li Gan is a neuroscientist and professor at Weill Cornell Medical College. She is known for her discovery of pathogenic tau protein acetylation in tauopathies and mechanisms of microglia dysfunction in neurodegeneration.

== Education and career ==
Gan attended Peking University from 1986 to 1990 and earned a BS in Physiology. She then attended Yale School of Medicine, where she was advised by Leonard K. Kaczmarek and studied voltage-gated potassium channels in high frequency-firing neurons. Gan received her PhD in Cellular & Molecular Physiology in 1996. Gan conducted postdoctoral studies with Gerald Fischbach at Harvard Medical School and with Lennart Mucke at the Gladstone Institute of Neurological Disease. From 2000 to 2003, she worked at AGY Therapeutics Inc., a biotechnology company based in South San Francisco, CA.

In 2003, Gan joined the Gladstone Institute as a staff research investigator and became an assistant adjunct professor in neurology at the University of California, San Francisco. She was promoted to assistant investigator/assistant professor in residence in 2009, and associate investigator/associate professor in 2011. Gan was promoted to full professor in 2016 and served as associate director of the Gladstone Institute of Neurological Disease from 2017 to 2018 before moving to Weill Cornell Medical College in 2018.

As of 2018, Gan is the Burton P. and Judith B. Resnick Distinguished Professor in Neurodegenerative Disease. She leads the Helen and Robert Appel Alzheimer's Disease Research Institute, where she succeeded Gregory Petsko as director.

== Research ==
The Gan lab studies molecular mechanisms of neurodegeneration in conditions such as Alzheimer's disease (AD) and FTDP-17. Her lab has also developed induced pluripotent stem cell culture models to study human brain cell function.

Gan has elucidated several roles of microglia in aging and disease. Her lab demonstrated that amyloid beta (Aβ) induces NF-κB signaling in microglia, and these microglia are the main mediators of Aβ-induced neuron death. Activation of SIRT1 deacetylase by overexpression or by treatment with resveratrol reduces microglial NF-κB signaling. Her lab has also found that SIRT1 expression in microglia naturally declines with age and causes upregulation of IL-1β, which in turn is correlated with chronological age and cognitive decline in humans. In a 2018 study in mice, the Gan lab demonstrated that haploinsufficiency of TREM2, the strongest immune cell-specific risk factor for AD, impairs microglia motility and increases tau pathology relative to either wildtype or complete knockout mice. Gan is also interested in sex-specific responses of microglia to neurodegeneration.

Gan also studies how mechanisms of proteostasis can contribute to pathogenic protein aggregation. Her lab demonstrated that cathepsin B (CatB) can degrade Aβ, the hallmark protein aggregate in AD. Their study indicated complex roles of cystatin C (CysC); CysC inhibits CatB degradation of Aβ peptides, but CysC itself inhibits the fibrillation of Aβ, which limits the overall rate of Aβ deposition.

In 2010, the Gan lab was first to report that tau acetylation regulates the turnover of pathogenic tau. They found that acetylated tau protein is elevated in early- and moderate-stage tauopathy, and that tau acetylation prevents proteasomal degradation of phosphorylated tau, which is a known mediator of neurodegeneration. Deletion of SIRT1 exacerbated tau acetylation, and inhibition of histone acetyltransferase p300 with the small molecule C646 eliminated pathogenic phospho-tau. Her lab has also demonstrated that acetylated tau is directly pathogenic by destabilizing the axon initial segment.

== Awards and honors ==
- 2015 Inge Grundke-Iqbal Award for Alzheimer's Research, Alzheimer's Association
- 2011 Glenn Award for Biological Mechanisms of Aging
