= A Bite of China: Celebrating the Chinese New Year =

- Poster
- Chinese: 舌尖上的新年
- Directed by: Chen Lei; Deng Jie; Li Yong
- Production companies: Donghai Dianying Group; Zhejiang Shitong Media; Hangzhou Xindingming Entertainment Investment; Iqiyi Pictures; Yinghuang (Beijing) Media
- Distributed by: Iqiyi Pictures
- Release date: January 7, 2016
- Running time: 89 minutes
- Country: China
- Language: Mandarin
- Box office: CN¥1.36 million

A Bite of China: Celebrating the Chinese New Year is a 2016 Chinese documentary film directed by Chen Lei, Deng Jie, and Li Yong. It was released in China on January 7, 2016, and stars Li Lihong.

== Reception ==
The film has grossed ¥1.36 million in China.
