= The Weird Doll =

- Poster
- Chinese: 诡娃
- Directed by: Kwang Che Ching
- Production companies: Beijing Chuanqi Meihua Media; Taiyuan Mingda Media
- Distributed by: Xinyue Pictures
- Release date: February 25, 2016
- Running time: 89 minutes
- Country: China
- Language: Mandarin
- Box office: CN¥3.6 million (China)

The Weird Doll (Chinese: 诡娃) is a 2016 Chinese horror thriller film directed by Kwang Che Ching. It was released in China on February 25, 2016.

== Plot ==
Xiaoling and Jin are an enviable couple. Under pressure from life, they move into the rental house of Ms. Chen, a charming woman who lives alone. Every night, the rag dolls in the old house create all kinds of horror events. At the same time, Ms. Chen tries every means to seduce Jin, which makes Xiaoling on the verge of collapse. Xiaoling, who is desperate, drinks the thousand-year magic juice and becomes a rag doll with no emotions. Jin, because of betrayal of love, falls into an abyss of no return.

== Cast ==
- Li Yuhang
- Cheng Yuanyuan
- Kong Wei

== Reception ==
The film has grossed CN¥3.634 million at the Chinese box office.
