= Li Lihong =

Chinese contemporary artist (born 1974)

Li Lihong (born 1974) is a Chinese contemporary artist. He is known for his innovative porcelain sculptures that blend traditional Chinese craftsmanship with modern Western iconography.

== Early life and education ==
Li Lihong's was born in 1974 in Jingdezhen, China. This city has been celebrated for centuries as a hub of fine porcelain production, historically supplying royal collections and exports. Under the mentorship of ceramic master Qin Xiling, Li honed his skills in traditional porcelain techniques. He pursued formal education at the China Central Academy of Art and Design in Beijing, earning his Bachelor of Fine Arts in 1996. Later, he obtained a Master of Fine Arts from the Jingdezhen Ceramics Institute in 2005.

== Career and practice ==
Li's artistry is distinguished by his fusion of classic Chinese porcelain art with globally recognized symbols. His works reinterpret iconic logos—such as McDonald's arches, Apple's apple, and the Nike swoosh—through the lens of traditional Chinese aesthetics. This juxtaposition comments on the intersection of Eastern and Western cultures in the context of globalization.

Throughout his career, Li has showcased his sculptures in numerous exhibitions worldwide. Notably, his work was featured in the "Breaking the Mold" exhibition at the Dennos Museum in the United States in 2009. He has also participated in significant art fairs, including the Armory Show and SOFA New York in 2011. Li's unique approach has garnered attention from various art institutions and galleries. His pieces have been displayed at ART LABOR Gallery in Shanghai, where he presented a solo exhibition titled "Merry Christmas - China" in 2007. Additionally, his works have been part of group exhibitions such as "CHINA NOW" at Canvas International Art in Amsterdam.

Currently residing in Shanghai, Li continues to create art that bridges traditional Chinese porcelain techniques with contemporary themes.
