= Chen Zeyu =

Chinese actor, model, and singer

- Born: July 24, 1983 (age 41); Changsha, Hunan, China
- Occupation(s): Singer, actor
- Years active: 2006–present

Chinese name
- Traditional Chinese: 陳澤宇
- Simplified Chinese: 陈泽宇
Transcriptions
Standard Mandarin
- Hanyu Pinyin: Chén Zéyǔ
- Musical career
- Origin: China
- Genres: Mandopop
- Labels: Gold Typhoon

Chen Zeyu (born July 24, 1983) is a Chinese actor, model, singer, and a member of the Chinese boyband Go Go Club.

== Filmography ==
=== Films ===
- 2006 Zhen Ai Wu Yan (真爱无言) as Lei (雷)
- 2009 Pleasant Goat and Big Big Wolf as Dong Dong (咚咚锵)

=== Television ===
- 2007 My Prince (青蛙王子) as Su Ze (苏泽)
- 2008 The Prince of Tennis (网球王子) as Zhou Zhu (周助)
- 2009 Armor Hero (铠甲勇士) as Ze Xi (泽西)
- 2009 The Prince of Tennis 2 (加油！网球王子) as Zhou Zhu (周助)

== Theatre credits ==
- 2010 Killer of the Three Kingdoms (三国杀·哈欠) as Zhao Yun (赵云)
