= Chang Chen Ghost Stories (2016 film) =

- Poster
- Chinese: 张震讲故事之合租屋
- Directed by: Zhan Yue
- Production companies: Kurui Hezi (Beijing) Entertainment; Suzhou Kurui Haozi Advertisement; Shanghai Langying Entertainment; Shanghai Ruisheng Culture Transmission Centre
- Distributed by: Sanyue Guyu (Beijing) Meida; Huanyu Zongheng Shiji Film Distribution (Beijing); Shanghai Langying Entertainment
- Release date: 8 July 2016
- Running time: 87 minutes
- Country: China
- Language: Mandarin
- Box office: CN¥4.1 million

Chang Chen Ghost Stories is a 2016 Chinese romance horror thriller film directed by Zhan Yue. It was released in China on 8 July 2016.

== Plot ==
Violinist Xiaoying moved into a shared apartment with four bedrooms and one living room, and was warmly welcomed by the three tenants: the sissy fitness coach Lin Yu, the "Weibo Internet celebrity" Mo Zheng and the socialite Wan Su. The four seemingly different people get along well with each other, and the other three seem to have a particularly close relationship; however, after Xiaoying found a mysterious notebook, nightmares gradually invaded, and the thrilling records in the notebook reappeared in Xiaoying's life. Xiaoying began to have hallucinations and thought she was another person; through visits, she found that the owner of the diary was the previous tenant of her room, who died in a bizarre accident.

== Cast ==
- Lu Shan
- Fu Heng
- Wu Jinxi
- Song Hanhuan
- Ding Qi
- Wei Yun
- Li Yu

== Reception ==
The film has grossed CN¥4.1 million in China.
