= List of Vogue Taiwan cover models =

This list of Vogue Taiwan cover models (1996–present) is a catalog of cover models who have appeared on the cover of Vogue Taiwan, the Taiwanese edition of American fashion magazine Vogue.

== 1990s ==
=== 1996 ===
| Issue | Cover model | Photographer |
|---|---|---|
| October | Linda Evangelista | Steven Meisel |
| November | Maggie Cheung | Eddie Wong |
| December | Madonna | Steven Meisel |

=== 1997 ===
| Issue | Cover model | Photographer |
|---|---|---|
| January | Stella Tennant | Steven Meisel |
| February | Winona Ryder | Steven Meisel |
| March | Kirsty Hume | Steven Meisel |
| April | Kirsty Hume | Mark Abraham |
| May | Tien Hsin | Quo Ying Sheng |
| June | Georgina Grenville | Steven Meisel |
| July | Uma Thurman | Steven Meisel |
| August | Anita Mui | Bruce Yu |
| September | Amber Valletta; Linda Evangelista | Steven Meisel |
| October | Charlotte Chiang; Kelly Han; Lin Chi-ling | Quo Ying Shen |
| November | Anita Yuen | Quo Ying Shen |
| December | Joey Wong | Quo Ying Shen |

=== 1998 ===
| Issue | Cover model | Photographer |
|---|---|---|
| January | Cameron Diaz | Steven Meisel |
| February | Stella Tennant | Steven Meisel |
| March | Carolyn Murphy | Steven Meisel |
| April | Karen Elson | Steven Meisel |
| May | Angela Lindvall | Steven Meisel |
| June | Ayumi Tanabe | Steven Meisel |
| July | Audrey Marnay | Irving Penn |
| August | Karen Elson | Steven Meisel |
| September | Kate Moss | Nick Knight |
| October | Angela Lindvall; Bridget Hall; Carolyn Murphy | Tom Munro |
| November | Carolyn Murphy | Steven Meisel |
| December | Carolyn Murphy; Shu Qi | |

=== 1999 ===
| Issue | Cover model | Photographer |
|---|---|---|
| January | Amber Valletta | Steven Meisel |
| February | Karen Mok | Jason Wu |
| March | Linda Evangelista | Raymond Meier |
| April | Carolyn Murphy | Steven Meisel |
| May | Maggie Rizer; Kate Moss | Steven Meisel |
| June | Carmen Kass | Steven Meisel |
| July | Carolyn Murphy | Steven Meisel |
| August | Lisa Ratliffe | Steven Meisel |
| September | Nicole Kidman | Steven Meisel |
| October | Gwyneth Paltrow | Steven Meisel |
| November | Carolyn Murphy | Steven Meisel |
| December | Kate Moss; Gisele Bündchen; Lauren Hutton; Iman; Naomi Campbell; Stephanie Seymour; Amber Valletta; Christy Turlington; Claudia Schiffer; Lisa Taylor; Paulina Porizkova; Carolyn Murphy; Patti Hansen | Annie Leibovitz |

== 2000s ==
=== 2000 ===
| Issue | Cover model | Photographer |
|---|---|---|
| January | Winona Ryder | Steven Meisel |
| February | Gisele Bündchen; Carmen Kass | Steven Meisel |
| March | Milla Jovovich | Patrick Shaw |
| April | Zhou Xun | Leslie Kee |
| May | Charlize Theron | Steve Shaw |
| June | Shu Qi | Leslie Kee |
| July | Gisele Bündchen; George Clooney | Herb Ritts |
| August | Gigi Leung Wing-Kei | Lee Shou Chih |
| September | Vivian Hsu | Lee Shou Chih |
| October | Namie Amuro | Leslie Kee |
| November | Cecilia Cheung | Lee Shou Chih |
| December | Miho Nakayama | Leslie Kee |

=== 2001 ===
| Issue | Cover model | Photographer |
|---|---|---|
| January | Norika Fujiwara | Lee Shou Chih |
| February | Zhang Ziyi | Lee Shou Chih |
| March | Kim Min Jung | Lee Shou Chih |
| April | Takako Tokiwa | Leslie Kee |
| May | Nicole Kidman | Annie Leibovitz |
| June | Sammi Cheng | Lee Shou Chih |
| July | Zhou Xun | Lee Shou Chih |
| August | Renée Zellweger | Herb Ritts |
| September | Lee Young Ae | Lee Shou Chih |
| October | Takeshi Kaneshiro | Yoshihisa Marutani |
| November | Shu Qi | Lee Shou Chih |
| December | Cecilia Cheung | Lee Shou Chih |

=== 2002 ===
| Issue | Cover model | Photographer |
|---|---|---|
| January | Qing Hai Lu | Lee Shou Chih |
| February | Zhang Ziyi | Lee Shou Chih |
| March | Karen Mok | Leslie Kee |
| April | Faye Wong; Tony Leung Chiu-Wei | Lee Shou Chih |
| May | Rene Liu | Lee Shou Chih |
| June | Natalie Portman | Steven Klein |
| July | Zhao Wei | Steven Klein |
| August | Gigi Leung | Lee Shou Chih |
| September | Ayumi Hamasaki | Leslie Kee |
| October | Takeshi Kaneshiro | Kazutake Nakamura |
| November | Kate Hudson | Herb Ritts |
| December | Maggie Cheung Man-Yuk; Tony Leung Chiu-Wei | Leslie Kee |

=== 2003 ===
| Issue | Cover model | Photographer |
|---|---|---|
| January | Catherine Zeta-Jones; Renée Zellweger | Annie Leibovitz |
| February | Shu Qi | Cheung Man Wah |
| March | Zhou Xun | Jason Wu |
| April | Julianne Moore | Steven Klein |
| May | Mika Nakashima | Yoshihiro Kawaguchi |
| June | Cameron Diaz | Annie Leibovitz |
| July | Charlie Young | Yoshihiro Kawaguchi |
| August | Karen Mok | Joshua Lin |
| September | Sarah Jessica Parker | Steven Meisel |
| October | Takeshi Kaneshiro; Gigi Leung | Yoshihisa Marutani |
| November | David Beckham; Victoria Beckham | Mario Testino |
| December | Nicole Kidman | Annie Leibovitz |

=== 2004 ===
| Issue | Cover model | Photographer |
|---|---|---|
| January | Miriam Yeung & Tony Leung | Lee Shou Chih |
| February | Uma Thurman | Annie Leibovitz |
| March | Shu Qi | Samson Mak |
| April | Angelina Jolie | Mario Testino |
| May | Zhang Ziyi | Jason Wu |
| June | Scarlett Johansson | Corinne Day |
| July | Chang Chen & Faye Wong | Samson Mak |
| August | Tony Leung; Zhang Ziyi | Samson Mak |
| September | Chiling Lin | Lee Shou Chih |
| October | Faye Wong; Tony Leung Chiu-Wei; Ziyi Zhang; Carina Lau; Chang Chen | Samson Mak |
| October | Takuya Kimura | Naka |
| November | Barbie Shu; Dee Shu | Samson Mak |
| December | Jennifer Connelly | Mario Testino |

=== 2005 ===
| Issue | Cover model | Photographer |
|---|---|---|
| January | Gemma Ward | Craig McDean |
| February | Shu Qi | Samson Mak |
| March | Karen Mok | Samson Mak |
| April | Sandra Bullock | Steven Meisel |
| May | Gemma Ward | Mario Testino |
| June | Drew Barrymore | Annie Leibovitz |
| July | Angelina Jolie | Annie Leibovitz |
| August | Kō Shibasaki | Yoshihiro Kawaguchi |
| September | Chiling Lin; Hidetoshi Nakata | Jason Wu |
| October | Dee Hsu | Jason Wu |
| November | Patty Hou | Jason Wu |
| December | Gemma Ward; Du Juan | Patrick Demarchelier |

=== 2006 ===
| Issue | Cover model | Photographer |
|---|---|---|
| January | Zhang Ziyi | Leslie Kee |
| February | Kate Moss | Craig McDean |
| March | Shu Qi | Samson Mak |
| April | Rainie Yang | Tim Ho |
| May | Chiling Lin | Lee Shou Chih |
| May | Choi Woo | Lee Shou Chih |
| June | Keira Knightley | Mario Testino |
| July | Zhou Xun | Lee Shou Chih |
| August | Natalia Vodianova | Patrick Demarchelier |
| September | Nanako Matsushima | Leslie Kee |
| October | Shu Qi | Lee Shou Chih |
| November | Du Juan | Lee Shou Chih |
| December | Rene Liu | Jason Wu |

=== 2007 ===
| Issue | Cover model | Photographer |
|---|---|---|
| January | Rainie Yang | Tim Ho |
| February | Nicole Kidman | Mario Testino |
| March | Sienna Miller | Craig McDean |
| April | Jolin Tsai | Yoshihiro Kawaguchi |
| May | Chi-Line Lin | Jason Wu |
| June | Anna Tsuchiya | Yoshihiro Kawaguchi |
| July | Lily Donaldson; Hilary Rhoda; Doutzen Kroes; Sasha Pivovarova; Caroline Trentini | Steven Meisel |
| August | Natalia Vodianova | Mario Testino |
| September | Rainie Yang | Yoshihiro Kawaguchi |
| October | Zhou Xun | |
| November | Zhang Ziyi | Christian Kettiger |
| December | Takeshi Kaneshiro | |

=== 2008 ===
| Issue | Cover model | Photographer |
|---|---|---|
| January | Gwei Lun-mei | |
| February | Patty Hou | |
| March | Lin Chi-ling | |
| April | Wei Tang | |
| May | Sasha Pivovarova | Lachlan Bailey |
| June | Sarah Jessica Parker | |
| July | Rainie Yang | |
| August | Dee Hsu | |
| September | Zhou Xun | |
| October | Yū Aoi | |
| November | Zhang Ziyi | Mario Sorrenti |
| December | Takeshi Kaneshiro | Genki Onda |

=== 2009 ===
| Issue | Cover model | Photographer |
|---|---|---|
| January | Patty Hou | Tim Ho |
| February | Liu Yi Fei | Yoshihiro Kawaguchi |
| March | Rainie Yang | Yoshihiro Kawaguchi |
| April | Karena Lam | Tim Ho |
| May | Hu Ting-ting | Tim Ho |
| June | Nanako Matsushima | Leslie Kee |
| July | Yoshi Chang | Jason Wu |
| August | Hsu Li Yu | Tim Ho |
| September | Lin Chi-ling | |
| October | Chiling Lin | |
| November | Aaron Kwok | Lee Shou Chih |
| December | Cheryl Yang | Lee Shou Chih |

== 2010s ==
=== 2010 ===
| Issue | Cover model | Photographer |
|---|---|---|
| January | Godfrey Gao; Ethan Juan; Mark Chao | |
| February | Li Bingbing | Chiang Chun Ming |
| March | Amber Kuo | |
| April | Jolin Tsai | Mika Ninagawa |
| May | Gwei Lun Mei | Jason Wu |
| June | Sarah Jessica Parker | Mario Testino |
| July | Vivian Hsu | Yoshihiro Kawaguchi |
| August | Angelababy | Jason Wu |
| September | Barbie Shu & Dee Shu | |
| October | Rainie Yang | |
| November | Chiling Lin | Jason Wu |
| December | Yung Yung Chang | |

=== 2011 ===
| Issue | Cover model | Photographer |
|---|---|---|
| January | Gwei Lun Mei | |
| February | Patty Hou | |
| March | Shu Qi | Jason Wu |
| April | Amber Kuo | |
| May | Cheryl Yang | |
| June | Ning Chang | |
| July | Zhou Xun | |
| August | Vivian Hsu | |
| September | A-mei | |
| October | Takeshi Kaneshiro | Takaki Kumada |
| November | Rainie Yang | |
| December | Angelababy | Paul Tsang |

=== 2012 ===
| Issue | Cover model | Photographer |
|---|---|---|
| January | Michelle Chen | |
| February | Dee Shu | |
| March | Cheryl Yang | Tim Ho |
| April | Jolin Tsai | |
| May | Vivian Hsu | |
| June | Shu Qi | Chang Mon Hwa |
| July | Rainie Yang | Tim Ho |
| August | Amber Kuo | |
| September | A-mei | |
| October | Chiling Lin | Tim Ho |
| November | Gwei Lun Mei | |
| December | Zhang Rong Rong | Lee Shou Chih |

=== 2013 ===
| Issue | Cover model | Photographer |
|---|---|---|
| January | Angelababy | Tim Ho |
| February | Zhang Ziyi & Chang Chen | Tim Ho |
| March | Jolin Tsai | Tim Ho |
| April | Gwei Lun Mei | Tim Ho |
| May | Dee Shu | Jason Wu |
| June | Amber Kuo | Lee Shou Chih |
| July | Ivy Chen | Lee Shou Chih |
| August | Kate Moss | Patrick Demarchelier |
| September | Vivian Hsu | Tim Ho |
| October | Chiling Lin | Mika Ninagawa |
| November | Rainie Yang | Mika Ninagawa |
| December | Ning Chang | Jason Wu |

=== 2014 ===
| Issue | Cover model | Photographer |
|---|---|---|
| January | Patty Hou | Lee Shou Chih |
| February | Cheryl Yang | Lee Shou Chih |
| March | Shu Qi | Tim Ho |
| April | Namie Amuro | Tim Ho |
| May | Miranda Kerr | Tim Ho |
| June | Puff Kuo | Henry Chen |
| July | Angelababy | Paul Tsang |
| August | Kō Shibasaki | Mika Ninagawa |
| September | S.H.E | Lee Shou Chih |
| October | Gwei Lun Mei | Tim Ho & Ariel Hsu |
| November | Takeshi Kaneshiro | Takaki Kumada |
| December | Ariel Lin | Lee Shou Chih |

=== 2015 ===
| Issue | Cover model | Photographer |
|---|---|---|
| January | Ha Ji Won | Lee Shou Chih |
| February | Suki Waterhouse | Tim Ho |
| March | Vivian Hsu | Lee Shou Chih |
| April | Patty Hou | Naomi Yang |
| May | Rainie Yang | Lee Shou Chih & Ariel Hsu |
| June | Jolin Tsai | Josh Chang |
| July | Hebe Tien | Lee Shou Chih |
| August | Chiling Lin | Lee Shou Chih & Ariel Hsu |
| September | Fan Bingbing | Sun Jun |
| October | Gwei Lun-mei | Tim Ho |
| November | Wei Ning Hsu | Lucian Bor |
| December | Ariel Lin | Leslie Kee |

=== 2016 ===
| Issue | Cover model | Photographer |
|---|---|---|
| January | Janine Chang | Tim Ho |
| February | Namie Amuro | Mika Ninagawa |
| March | Rainie Yang | Cliff Chen |
| April | Amber Kuo | Naomi Yang |
| May | Ha Ji Won | Kim Yeong Jun |
| June | Dee Shu | Ming Shih Chiang |
| August | Gwei Lun-mei | Cliff Chen |
| September | Im Yoon-ah | Kim Yeongjun |
| October | Chiling Lin & Andrés Palacios; Chiling Lin | Enrique Vega |
| November | Nana Komatsu | Mika Ninagawa |
| December | Takeshi Kaneshiro | |

=== 2017 ===
| Issue | Cover model | Photographer |
|---|---|---|
| January | Milla Jovovich | An Le |
| February | Vivian Hsu; Patty Hou; Ruby Lin | Lee Shou Chih |
| March | Han Hyo Joo | Kim Yeongjun |
| April | Amber An | Zoey Grossman |
| May | Janine Chang; Hsu Wei-ning; Janine Chang & Hsu Wei-ning | |
| June | Park Shin-hye | Ahn Jooyoung |
| July | Amber Kuo | Chiang Ming Shih |
| August | Chiling Lin | Tim Ho |
| September | Song Ji-hyo | Jdz Chung |
| October | Gwei Lun-mei | Enrique Vega |
| November | Elly Hsu; Dee Hsu; Alice Hsu; Lily Hsu | Yi Wei Lai |
| December | Xie Jin Yan | Enrique Vega |

=== 2018 ===
| Issue | Cover model | Photographer |
|---|---|---|
| January | Ouyang Nana | Chiang Ming Shih |
| February | Park Bo-gum | Chiang Ming Shih |
| March | Rainie Yang | Chiang Ming Shih |
| April | Annie Chen | Calesb & Gladys |
| May | Jam Hsiao | Tim Ho |
| June | Joanne Tseng | Cliff Chen |
| July | Namie Amuro | Leslie Kee |
| August | Gong Hyo-jin | Kim Tae Eun |
| September | Amber An | Dennis Fei |
| September | FanFan | Adams Chane |
| September | Joanne Tseng & Prince Chiu | Lee Shou Chih |
| September | Puff Kuo | Lan Chi Sheng |
| September | Summer Meng | Chou Mou |
| September | Xie Xin Ying | Ajerry Sung |
| October | Qin Lan | Chen Man |
| November | Gwei Lun-mei | Yu Jing-pin |
| December | Janine Chang | Chen Ming Sheng |

=== 2019 ===
| Issue | Cover model | Photographer |
|---|---|---|
| January | Hannah Quinlivan | Enrique Vega |
| February | Lin Chi-ling | Chou Mo |
| March | Ella Chen | Manolo Campion |
| April | Park Seo-joon | Kim Jaehoon |
| May | Dee Hsu | Yu Jing-pin |
| June | Gwei Lun-mei | Liu Chen-hsiang |
| July | Vivian Hsu | Ming Shih Chiang |
| August | Park Min-young | Kim Young Jun |
| September | Jeannie Hsieh | Puzzleman Leung |
| October | G.E.M. | Lee Shou Chih |
| November | Tiffany Ann Hsu | Unknown |
| December | Akira; Lin Chi-ling | Yu Jing-Pin |

== 2020s ==
=== 2020 ===
| Issue | Cover model | Photographer |
|---|---|---|
| January | Joanne Tseng | Chou Mo |
| February | Hannah Quinlivan | Yu Jing Pin |
| March | Gia Tang; Chinchin Hsu | Dan Martensen |
| April | Felicia Fan; Tseng Ai | Manbo Key and Chien-Wen Lin |
| May | Jolie Chang | Poyen Chen |
| June | Liu Hsin Yu | Zhong Lin |
| July | Giwa Huang; Rouyi Fang; John Yuyi | John Yuyi |
| August | Wan Yu | Zhong Lin |
| September | Jessie Hsu | Zhong Lin |
| October | Vivian Hsu; Ariel Lin | Ming Shih Chiang |
| November | Yura Nakano | Agata Pospieszynska |
| December | Shu Qi | Ming Shih Chiang |

=== 2021 ===
| Issue | Cover model | Photographer |
|---|---|---|
| January | Vanessa Pan; Wang Wen; U Seng I Zhou Hengchi; Zachary Chou | Poyenchen |
| February | Hilda Lee | Chou Mo |
| March | Chiharu Okunugi | James Law |
| April | Hsu Chen Hsuan; Jean Chang | Zhong Lin |
| May | Alexandra Micu | Julien Vallon |
| June | Aura Tao | Chou Mo |
| July | Lisa | Kim Hee June |
| August | Gia Tang | Manbo Key; Lin Chien-wen |
| September | Abao; Bulareyaung & Bulareyaung Dance Company | Zhong Lin |
| October | Crowd Lu; Wendy Huang Wan-yu; Kiki Chen Yu-nuo | Cheng Po Ou-yang |
| November | Kuo Hsing-chun | Zhong Lin |
| December | Gwei Lun-mei | Chou Yi-hsien |

=== 2022 ===
| Issue | Cover model | Photographer |
|---|---|---|
| January | Peng Chang | Zhong Lin |
| February | E.so | Poyen Chen |
| March | Ruby Lin; Nikki Hsieh; Cheryl Yang; Esther Liu; Cherry Hsieh; Puff Kuo; Cammy Chiang | Weslie Wei |
| April | Zoe Fang | Hey Chang |
| May | Wang Yu | Manbo Key; Chien-Wen Lin |
| June | Bingbing Liu; Kayako | Zhong Lin |
| July | G-Dragon | Kim Hee June |
| August | Hush | Manbo Key; Chien-Wen Lin |
| September | Jolin Tsai | Zhong Lin |
| October | Barbie Hsu; DJ Koo | Zhong Lin |
| November | Michelle Yeoh | Agnes Lloyd-Platt |
| December | Jay Chou | Zhong Lin |

=== 2023 ===
| Issue | Cover model | Photographer |
|---|---|---|
| January | Fang-Yi Sheu | Zhong Lin |
| February | Sun Tsui-feng | Manbo Key; Chien-Wen Lin |
| February | Sora Choi | Theo Liu |
| March | Jennie | Kim Hee June |
| April | Hsieh Ying-xuan | Hedy Chang |
| May | Chloe Magno | Zhong Lin |
| June | Jessie Hsu Chen-xuan | Manbo Key, ChienWen Lin |
| July | Chang Chen | Zhong Lin |
| August | Ai Tominaga | Zhong Lin |
| September | Hilda Lee | Troy Wang |
| October | Christina Chung, Majin, Lin Chan-chen-Mei, Tseng Yu-chen, Yu Xing-yi & Yu Xing-rao, Niang Niang, Nana, Su Po-ya | Manbo Key, ChienWen Lin |
| November | Tony Leung Chiu-wai | Giseok Cho |
| December | Hsu Kuang-han | Zhong Lin |

=== 2024 ===
| Issue | Cover model | Photographer | Ref. |
|---|---|---|---|
| January | Hikari Mitsushima | Zhong Lin | |
| February | Stephanie Hsu | Peter Ash Lee | |
| March | Hyun Ji Shin | Cho Gi-seok | |
| April | Kiko Mizuhara | Zhong Lin | |
| May | Kate Moss | Nikolai von Bismarck | |
| June | Aimee Sun; Trinity Liao | Zhong Lin | |
| July | Nymphia Wind | Manbo Key & Lin Chien-Wen | |
| August | Lo Chia-ling, Lin Yu-ting | Troy Wang | |
| August | Lee Yang, Wang Chi-lin | Troy Wang | |
| September | Kim Ji Won | Kim Hee June | |
| October | Gwei Lun-mei | Kuo Fang Wei | |
| November | Sylvia Chang | Joshua Lin | |
| December | Tilda Swinton | Zhong Lin | |

=== 2025 ===
| Issue | Cover model | Photographer | Ref. |
|---|---|---|---|
| January | Zoé Fang | Zhong Lin | |
| February | Kuei-Mei Yang | Kuo Huan Kao | |
| March | G-Dragon | Kim Hee June | |
| April | A-Mei | Alien Wang | |
| May | Michelle Yeoh | Kuo Huan Kao | |
| June | Nana Komatsu | Fish Zhang | |
| July | Kentaro Sakaguchi | Troy Wang | |
| August | Liu Hsin Yu | Kuo Huan Kao | |
| September | Chloe Magno | Zhong Lin | |
| October | Song Hye-kyo | Kim Hee June | |
| October | Song Hye-kyo | Mok Jungwook | |
| November | Ashley Park | Arseny Jabiev | |
| December | Jolin Tsai | Studio Muci | |

=== 2026 ===
| Issue | Cover model | Photographer | Ref. |
|---|---|---|---|
| January | Peng Chang | Manbo Key | |
| February | Song Ah | Kuo Huan Kao | |
| March | Zine Tseng | Ace Amir | |
| April | Zoe Fang | Cho Gi-seok | |
| May | John Yuyi | John Yuyi | |
| June | Freen Sarocha | Mark Kawin | |
| July | Peggy Gou | Hyeawon Kang | |
| August | Greg Hsu | Zhong Lin | |
| September | Dee Hsu | Icura Chiang | |
| October | Carolyn Murphy | Emmanuel Monsalve | |
| November | Chang Chen | Kuo Huan Ka | |
| November | Gwei Lun-mei | Troy Wang | |
