= 21st Beijing College Student Film Festival =

2014 film festival in Beijing, China

The 21st Beijing College Student Film Festival (simplified Chinese: 第二十一届北京大学生电影节; traditional Chinese: 第二十一屆北京大學生電影節) took place in Beijing, China in May 2014. Director Cao Baoping's Einstein and Einstein received the Best Film Award, while Diao Yi'nan, director of Black Coal, Thin Ice was crowned with the Best Director title. Nick Cheung clinched the Best Actor title for his role in Unbeatable. The Best Actress Award went to Tang Wei, in recognition for her performance in Finding Mr. Right.

== Winners and nominees ==
Best Film: Einstein and Einstein – Cao Baoping; Black Coal, Thin Ice – Diao Yi'nan; Finding Mr. Right – Xue Xiaolu; Tell Me A Beautiful World – Liu Yijun; Young Style – Liu Jie	Best Director: Diao Yi'nan – Black Coal, Thin Ice; Ning Hao – Western Sunshine; Cao Baoping – Einstein and Einstein; Ning Ying – The Police Diary; Liu Yijun – Tell Me A Beautiful World
Best Actor: Nick Cheung – Unbeatable; Liao Fan – Black Coal, Thin Ice; Wang Jingchun – The Police Diary; Cheng Taishen – Tell Me A Beautiful World; Wu Xiubo – Finding Mr. Right	Best Actress: Tang Wei – Finding Mr. Right; Sandrine Pinna – The Chrysalis; Zhang Jingchu – My Running Shadow; Yang Zishan – So Young; Gwei Lun-mei – Black Coal, Thin Ice
Artistic Exploration Award: Memories Look At Me – Song Fang; The Chef, the Actor, the Scoundrel – Guan Hu; Black Coal, Thin Ice – Diao Yi'nan; Tell Me A Beautiful World – Liu Yijun; My Running Shadow – Fang Gangliang	Best Visual Effects: Young Detective Dee: Rise of the Sea Dragon – Tsui Hark; Unbeatable – Dante Lam; Drug War – Johnnie To; Out of Inferno – Pang Brothers; Western Sunshine – Ning Hao
Best Newcomer: Young Style – Dong Zijian; My Running Shadow – Long Pinxu; Beijing Love Story – Liu Haoran; Song of the Phoenix – Li Mincheng	Best Directorial Debut: Beijing Love Story – Chen Sicheng; So Young – Zhao Wei; The Chrysalis – Qiu Chuji
Jury Award: Liu Yijun – Tell Me A Beautiful World; Xue Xiaolu – Finding Mr. Right; Liu Jie – Young Style	Committee Special Award: Wu Tianming – Song of the Phoenix; Guo Fan – My Old Classmate
Students' Choice Award for Favorite Actor: Feng Shaofeng – Young Detective Dee: Rise of the Sea Dragon	Students' Choice Award for Favorite Actress: Gwei Lun-mei – Black Coal, Thin Ice; Angelababy – Young Detective Dee: Rise of the Sea Dragon
Students' Choice Award for Favorite Director: Guan Hu – The Chef, the Actor, the Scoundrel	Special Award for National Themes: Bayin – Norjmaa
