= Golden Horse Award for Best Action Choreography =

Taiwanese film award

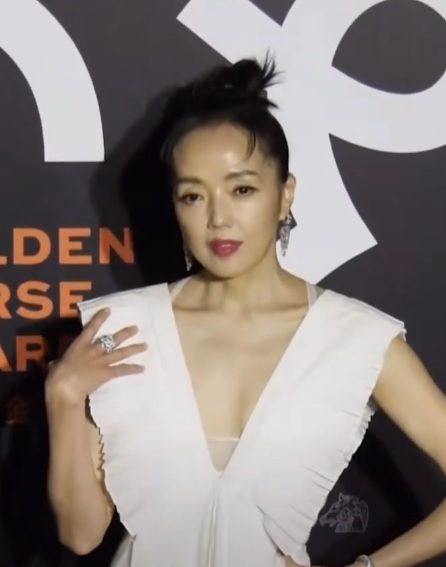
- The 2022 recipient: Sheu Fang-yi
- Awarded for: Best Action Choreography
- Location: Taiwan
- Presented by: Taipei Golden Horse Film Festival Executive Committee
- First award: 1992
- Currently held by: Sheu Fang-yi for Salute (2022)
- Website: www.goldenhorse.org.tw

The Golden Horse Award for Best Action Choreography (Chinese: 金馬獎最佳動作設計) is given at the Golden Horse Film Awards, a film festival and awards ceremony held annually in Taiwan. The award has been given every year since 1992.

== Winners and nominees ==
Note: Original titles are in traditional Chinese.

=== 1990s ===
Year	Winner and nominees	Film	Original title
1992 (29th)
1992 (29th)	Ching Siu-tung, Yuen Bun	Dragon Inn	新龍門客棧
1992 (29th)	Stanley Tong	Supercop	警察故事III超級警察 (Cantonese version)
1992 (29th)	Yuen Wo-ping	Once Upon a Time in China II	黃飛鴻之II男兒當自強
1992 (29th)	Yuen Tak	Saviour of the Soul	新神雕俠侶
1993 (30th)
1993 (30th)	Corey Yuen, Yuen Tak	The Legend of Fong Sai-yuk	功夫皇帝方世玉
1993 (30th)	Yuen Wo-ping, Yuen Cheung-yan, DeeDee	Tai Chi Master	太極張三豐
1993 (30th)	Jackie Chan, JC Stunt Team	Crime Story	重案組
1993 (30th)	Tony Leung	Temptation of a Monk	誘僧
1994 (31st)
1994 (31st)	JC Stunt Team, Lau Kar-leung	Drunken Master II	醉拳II
1994 (31st)	Ching Siu-tung	Love on Delivery	破壞之王
1994 (31st)	Kong Tao-hoi, Stephen Tun Wai, Poon Kin-kwang	The True Hero	暴雨驕陽
1995 (32nd)
1995 (32nd)	Corey Yuen, JC Stunt Team, Sammo Hung Stuntmen's Association	Thunderbolt	霹靂火
1995 (32nd)	Corey Yuen, Yuen Tak	My Father Is a Hero	父子武狀元
1995 (32nd)	Stanley Tong, Jackie Chan	Rumble in the Bronx	紅番區
1995 (32nd)	Corey Yuen, Yuen Tak	High Risk	鼠膽虎威
1996 (33rd)
1996 (33rd)	Stanley Tong	First Strike	簡單任務
1996 (33rd)	Ma Yuk-sing	Big Bullet	EU衝鋒隊
1996 (33rd)	Bruce Law	First Option	飛虎
1996 (33rd)	Yuen Tak	Somebody Up There Likes Me	浪漫風暴
1997 (34th)
1997 (34th)	JC Stunt Team, Cho Wing	Mr. Nice Guy	一個好人
1997 (34th)	Stephen Tung	Downtown Torpedoes	神偷諜影
1997 (34th)	Yuen Bun	Lifeline	十萬火急
1997 (34th)	Corey Yuen, Yuen Tak	Hero	馬永貞
1998 (35th)
1998 (35th)	JC Stunt Team	Who Am I?	我是誰
1998 (35th)	Dion Lam	The Stormriders	風雲雄霸天下
1998 (35th)	Stephen Tung	Hitman	殺手之王
1999 (36th)
1999 (36th)	Stephen Tung	Purple Storm	紫雨風暴
1999 (36th)	Hui Tien Shin	Generation Pendragon	一代梟雄--曹操
1999 (36th)	Dion Lam	A Man Called Hero	中華英雄
1999 (36th)	Jackie Chan, JC Stunt Team	Gorgeous	玻璃樽

=== 2000s ===
Year	Winner and Nominees	Film	Original Title
2000 (37th)
2000 (37th)	Yuen Wo-ping	Crouching Tiger, Hidden Dragon	臥虎藏龍
2000 (37th)	Sit Chun.wai	Tokyo Riders	東京攻略
2000 (37th)	Xiong Xinxin	Time and Tide	順流逆流
2000 (37th)	Philip Kwok	Double Tap	鎗王
2001 (38th)
2001 (38th)	Ching Siu-tung	My Classmate, the Barbarian	我的野蠻同學
2001 (38th)	Ching Siu-tung	Shaolin Soccer	少林足球
2001 (38th)	Stephen Tung, JC Stunt Team	The Accidental Spy	特務迷城
2001 (38th)	Yuen Wo-ping	The Legend of Zu	蜀山傳
2002 (39th)
2002 (39th)	Bruce Mang	Running Out of Time 2	暗戰2
2002 (39th)	Poon Kin-kwan	Chinese Odyssey 2002	天下無雙
2002 (39th)	Sam Wong, Mars	Give Them a Chance	給他們一個機會
2003 (40th)
2003 (40th)	Donnie Yen	The Twins Effect	千機變
2003 (40th)	Dion Lam	Infernal Affairs	無間道
2003 (40th)	Lee Tat Chiu	Colour of the Truth	黑白森林
2004 (41st)
2004 (41st)	Li Chung Chi, JC Stunt Team	New Police Story	新警察故事
2004 (41st)	Yuen Bun	Breaking News	大事件
2004 (41st)	Yuen Bun	Running on Karma	大隻佬
2004 (41st)	Chin Ka-lok	One Nite in Mongkok	旺角黑夜
2005 (42nd)
2005 (42nd)	Lau Kar-leung, Stephen Tung, Xiong Xinxin	Seven Swords	七劍
2005 (42nd)	Kong Tao-hoi	A World Without Thieves	天下無賊
2005 (42nd)	Yuen Wo-ping	Kung Fu Hustle	功夫
2005 (42nd)	Wong Chi-wai	Election	黑社會
2006 (43rd)
2006 (43rd)	Ling Chun Pong, Wong Chi-wai	Exiled	放·逐
2006 (43rd)	Stephen Tung, Farah Khan	Perhaps Love	如果·愛
2006 (43rd)	Yuen Wo-ping	Fearless	霍元甲
2006 (43rd)	Donnie Yen	Dragon Tiger Gate	龍虎門
2007 (44th)
2007 (44th)	Donnie Yen	Flash Point	導火綫
2007 (44th)	Li Chung Chi	Invisible Target	男兒本色
2007 (44th)	Jack Wong Wai Leung	Shamo	軍雞
2007 (44th)	Stephen Tung	A Battle of Wits	墨攻
2008 (45th)
2008 (45th)	Yau Chi-wai	Connected	保持通話
2008 (45th)	Wenders Li	The Warlords	集結號
2008 (45th)	Chen Hsiao-tung	Winds of September	投名狀
2008 (45th)	Kong Chi-leung	Claustrophobia	江山美人
2009 (46th)
2009 (46th)	Sammo Hung, Tony Leung	Ip Man	葉問
2009 (46th)	Chen Guan Long, Qin Hai Qiang	Cow	鬥牛
2009 (46th)	Philippe Decouflé	Face	臉
2009 (46th)	Stephen Tung, Bruce Law	The Beast Stalker	証人

=== 2010s ===
Year	Winner and Nominees	Film	Original Title
2010 (47th)
2010 (47th)	Sammo Hung	Ip Man 2	葉問 2
2010 (47th)	Stephen Tung, Lee Tat Chiu	Bodyguards and Assassins	十月圍城
2010 (47th)	Yuen Tak	Gallants	打擂台
2010 (47th)	Sammo Hung	Detective Dee and the Mystery of the Phantom Flame	通天神探狄仁傑
2011 (48th)
2011 (48th)	Donnie Yen	Wu Xia	武俠
2011 (48th)	Chin Ka-lok	Bruce Lee, My Brother	李小龍
2011 (48th)	Yang Kil Yong, Shim Jae Won	Warriors of the Rainbow: Seediq Bale	賽德克·巴萊
2011 (48th)	Dion Lam	Overhead 2	竊聽風雲2
2012 (49th)
2012 (49th)	Chin Ka-lok, Wong Wai Fai, Thomson NG	Motorway	車手
2012 (49th)	Xu Haofeng	Judge Archer	箭士柳白猿
2012 (49th)	Yuen Bun, Lan Hai Han, Sun Jian Kui	Flying Swords of Dragon Gate	龍門飛甲
2012 (49th)	Cyril Raffaélli, Li Chung Chi, Chen Chun Kun	Black & White: The Dawn of Assault	痞子英雄之全面開戰
2012 (49th)	Sammo Hung	Tai Chi 0	太極：從零開始
2013 (50th)
2013 (50th)	Jackie Chan, He Jun, JC Stunt Team	CZ12	十二生肖
2013 (50th)	Shing Man	The Way We Dance	狂舞派
2013 (50th)	Yuen Wo-ping	The Grandmaster	一代宗師
2013 (50th)	Tony Ling Chi Wah	Unbeatable	激戰
2013 (50th)	Stephen Chow, DeeDee	Journey to the West: Conquering the Demons	西遊降魔篇
2014 (51st)
2014 (51st)	Jack Wong Wai Leung	As the Light Goes Out	救火英雄
2014 (51st)	Li Chung Chi	The White Storm	掃毒
2014 (51st)	Yuen Bun, Lin Feng	Young Detective Dee: Rise of the Sea Dragon	狄仁傑之神都龍王
2014 (51st)	Donnie Yen, Stephen Tung, Yuen Bun, Yan Hua	Kung Fu Jungle	一個人的武林
2014 (51st)	Sang Lin	Brotherhood of Blades	綉春刀
2015 (52nd)
2015 (52nd)	Xu Haofeng	The Master	師父
2015 (52nd)	Corey Yuen	Rise of the Legend	黃飛鴻之英雄有夢
2015 (52nd)	Li Chung Chi	SPL II: A Time for Consequences	殺破狼II
2015 (52nd)	Yuen Bun	The Taking of Tiger Mountain 3D	智取威虎山3D
2015 (52nd)	Liu Mingzhe	The Assassin	刺客 聶隱娘
2016 (53rd)
2016 (53rd)	Mark Lee Ping Bin	Detective Chinatown	唐人街探案
2016 (53rd)	Shim Jae Won, Yang Kil Yong	Mojin: The Lost Legend	鬼吹燈之尋龍訣
2016 (53rd)	Chin Ka-lok	Cold War 2	寒戰2
2016 (53rd)	Yuen Wo-pink	Ip Man 3	葉問 3
2016 (53rd)	Adam Chan, Chung-tai	Mrs K	Mrs K
2017 (54th)
2017 (54th)	Sang Lin	Brotherhood of Blades II: The infernal Battlefield	綉春刀 II 修羅戰場
2017 (54th)	DeeDee	Wukdong	悟空傳
2017 (54th)	An Wande	Explosion	引爆者
2017 (54th)	Xu Haofeng	The Hidden Sword	刀背藏身
2017 (54th)	Sammo Hung	Paradox	殺破狼·貪狼
2018 (55th)
2018 (55th)	He Jun, Kenji Tanigaki, Yan Hua	Hidden Man	邪不壓正
2018 (55th)	DeeDee	Shadow	影'
2018 (55th)	Kenji Tanigaki	Detective Chinatown 2	捉妖記2
2018 (55th)	Yuen Shun-yi	Master Z: The Ip Man Legacy	葉問外傳：張天志
2018 (55th)	Bruce Law, Norman Law	The Shadow Play	風中有朵雨做的雲
2019 (56th)
2019 (56th)	Hung Shih-hao	The Scoundrels	狂徒
2019 (56th)	Hung Shih-hao, Chia Fan	We Are Champions	下半場
2019 (56th)	Jimmy Hung	Detention	返校
2019 (56th)	Gino Yang	Mayday Life	五月天 人生無限公司

=== 2020s ===
Year	Winner and Nominees	Film	Original Title
2020 (57th)
2020 (57th)	Teddy Ray Huang, Li Shao-peng	Get the Hell Out	逃出立法院
2020 (57th)	Zhang Peng	A Choo	打噴嚏
2020 (57th)	Shing Mak	The Way We Keep Dancing	狂舞派3
2020 (57th)	Tang Sui-wah	Hand Rolled Cigarette	手捲煙
2021 (58th)
2021 (58th)	Chan Man-fai, Chu Ke-feng, Feng Ren-zhi	Nezha	叱咤風雲
2021 (58th)	Hung Shih-hao	The Soul	緝魂
2021 (58th)	Hung Shih-hao	Treat or Trick	詭扯
2021 (58th)	Gino Yang	Till We Meet Again	月老
2021 (58th)	Jack Wong Wai-leung	Coffin Homes	鬼同你住
2022 (59th)
2022 (59th)	Sheu Fang-yi	Salute	我心我行
2022 (59th)	Liao Jia-sheng, Lin Kuei-hsieh, Chuang Jen-ming	Demigod: The Legend Begins	素還真
2022 (59th)	Jack Wong Wai-leung	Limbo	智齒
2022 (59th)	Hung Shih-hao	The Abandoned	查無此心
2022 (59th)	Sunny Pang	Geylang	芽籠
2023 (60th)
2023 (60th)	Hung Shih-hao	The Pig, The Snake and The Pigeon	周處除三害
2023 (60th)	Chiu Li-wei and Tony Wang	Pigsy	八戒
2023 (60th)	Hung Shih-hao	Marry My Dead Body	關於我和鬼變成家人的那件事
2023 (60th)	Hung Shih-hao	Miss Shampoo	請問，還有哪裡需要加強
2023 (60th)	Wu Jun-xi	The Bridge Curse: Ritual	女鬼橋2：怨鬼樓
