= Salute (2022 Taiwanese film) =

2022 Taiwanese film by Yao Hung-i

- Theatrical release poster
- Traditional Chinese: 我心我行
- Simplified Chinese: 我心我行
- Literal meaning: "My heart, my way"/ "My heart, I can"/ "My heart, my manoeuvres"
- Hanyu Pinyin: Wǒ xīn wǒ xíng
- Directed by: Yao Hung-i
- Written by: Yao Hung-i
- Produced by: Hou Hsiao-hsien; Chen Wei; Chen Po-chuan
- Starring: Sheu Fang-yi
- Cinematography: Yao Hung-i
- Edited by: Liao Ching-sung
- Music by: Lee Che-yi; Lim Giong
- Production company: Triple Film House
- Distributed by: Triple Film House
- Release dates: November 3, 2022 (Taipei Golden Horse); November 11, 2022
- Running time: 137 minutes
- Country: Taiwan
- Language: Mandarin
- Budget: NT$38 million

Salute (Chinese: 我心我行) is a 2022 Taiwanese biographical docudrama dance film written, directed and shot by Yao Hung-i, about the life of dancer Sheu Fang-yi. Starring Sheu herself, the film also features special appearances by Sun Tsui-feng, Bamboo Chen and Hsieh Ying-xuan. It received three nominations at the 59th Golden Horse Awards, and was released in theaters on November 11, 2022.

== Premise ==
Martha Graham once said: “A dancer dies twice — once when they stop dancing, and this first death is the more painful.”

At this intersection of her life, Sheu Fang-yi commemorates her glorious past two decades with a funeral, to farewell her past self, and to get ready to move toward her unknown future.

— TAICCA

== Cast ==
- Sheu Fang-yi as herself
- Sun Tsui-feng
- Bamboo Chen
- Hsieh Ying-xuan

== Awards and nominations ==
Awards	Category	Recipient	Result	Ref.
59th Golden Horse Awards	Best Cinematography	Yao Hung-i	Nominated	
59th Golden Horse Awards	Best Action Choreography	Sheu Fang-yi	Won	
59th Golden Horse Awards	Best Original Film Score	Lee Che-yi and Lim Giong	Nominated	
