= Princess Agents =

Chinese television series

- Promotional poster
- Also known as: Legend of Chu Qiao

Chinese name
- Traditional Chinese: 特工皇妃楚喬傳
- Simplified Chinese: 特工皇妃楚乔传
Transcriptions
Standard Mandarin
- Hanyu Pinyin: Tègōng Huángfēi Chǔ Qiáo Zhuàn
- Genre: Historical; Romance; Tragedy; Action
- Created by: Xiao Xiang Dong Er
- Based on: 11 Chu Te Gong Huang Fei
- Written by: Jia Wen; Yang Tao; Chen Lan
- Directed by: Wu Jinyuan
- Starring: Zhao Liying; Lin Gengxin; Shawn Dou; Li Qin; Deng Lun
- Opening theme: Zhang Bichen; Zhao Liying – Hope
- Ending theme: G.E.M. – Burning Heart
- Country of origin: China
- Original language: Mandarin
- No. of episodes: 58 (Uncut); 67 (TV version)

Production
- Executive producers: Li Cai; Liu Yingxuan
- Producers: Ma Zhongjun; Zhao Yifang
- Production locations: Hengdian World Studios; Inner Mongolia
- Running time: 45 minutes
- Production companies: Ciwen Entertainment; Croton Media; Mitao Media

Original release
- Network: Zona China, Hunan TV, WeTV, Viki
- Release: 5 June 2017 – August 1, 2017

Princess Agents (Chinese: 楚乔传; pinyin: chǔ qiáo zhuàn; lit. 'the legend of Chu Qiao') is a 2017 Chinese historical drama television series based on a novel written by Xiao Xiang Dong Er, directed by Wu Jinyuan and starring Zhao Liying, Lin Gengxin, Shawn Dou, Li Qin and Deng Lun. The drama was filmed in Hengdian World Studios and in Inner Mongolia, and aired on various channels from 5 June 2017 to 1 August 2017.

== Synopsis ==
The story is set during the Northern Wei dynasty, a period marked by political instability, kidnappings, and violent power struggles. Chu Qiao (also known as Jing Xiaoliu), a slave, is cast into a forest with other captives to be hunted for sport by aristocrats, including Yuwen Huai, Zhao Xifeng, Wei Shuye, Yan Xun, Prince of Northern Yan, and Yuan Song, the 13th Prince of Wei. Chu Qiao is the sole survivor.

She is subsequently assigned as a chamber maid to Yuwen Yue, where she undergoes rigorous training alongside her adopted siblings. During this period, she forms a close bond with Yan Xun. She later encounters Yuan Song and Xiao Ce, the Prince of Liang; both develop romantic feelings for her and support her, though she does not reciprocate their affections. Throughout these events, Yuwen Yue emerges as her primary protector and eventual romantic partner.

Political intrigue escalates when nobles of Western Wei, led by Yuwen Huai and Wei Shuyou, falsely accuse the Northern Yan royal family of treason. Acting on these accusations, the emperor orders the clan extermination of Yan Xun's family, although Yan Xun is spared due to the sacrifice of his mother. Yan Xun and Chu Qiao are imprisoned, and the massacre of his family transforms Yan Xun into an ambitious and ruthless figure determined to seek revenge, initially with Chu Qiao’s support.

Chu Qiao is later promoted to archery instructor and transferred to the Xiaoqi Camp, where she encounters officers of the Xiuli Army of Northern Yan. Although Yan Xun initially views them as traitors, Chu Qiao persuades him to spare them. Yan Xun maintains lingering regard for Yuan Chun, his childhood companion. When the emperor orders their marriage as part of a plot to assassinate Yan Xun, Yan Xun anticipates the betrayal and launches a rebellion. Yuan Chun pleads unsuccessfully to save him, and their bond is ultimately severed.

After ascending the throne as king of Northern Yan, Yan Xun grows increasingly distrustful of Chu Qiao and distances himself from her while pursuing power through morally questionable means. Disillusioned, Chu Qiao withdraws from him and grows closer to Yuwen Yue, deepening their romantic relationship. Yan Xun eventually orders Yuwen Yue’s assassination, prompting Chu Qiao to formally sever ties with Yan Xun and oppose his campaign of revenge.

Chu Qiao later learns that she is the daughter of Luo He, leader of the Fengyun Order, an intelligence network opposed to slavery and feudal warfare. Trained from childhood in advanced combat techniques, including the Cold Ice skill, Chu Qiao had been forced into hiding after her mother’s assassination, during which she lost her memory and was sold into slavery. Mr. Wu later reveals that Luo He’s death resulted from internal betrayal linked to the Wei and Liang factions and offers Chu Qiao her mother’s former position, which she declines.

As conflict intensifies in the north, Yuwen Yue is lured into a military trap and isolated on a frozen lake. After resisting capture, he is gravely wounded when Yan Xun personally orders an attack. Chu Qiao attempts to reach him but is forcibly separated as the ice collapses. As Yuwen Yue sinks beneath the lake, he urges Chu Qiao to survive. The event devastates her and marks her transformation into a resolute and independent force.

== Cast ==
=== Main ===
Actor	Character	Introduction
Zhao Liying	Chu Qiao / Jing Xiaoliu / Xing'er	She is an intelligent, brave and resilient young woman. That after being forced to watch helplessly while her loved ones died, she strives to find a path that allows her to change and thus destroy the injustice that surrounds them. Her true identity is later revealed, as the daughter of Luo He, the master of Feng Yun's order. After she nearly drowns, she loses her memory and is raised by her adoptive family, the Jings. Later along with her adoptive siblings they become slaves of the Yuwen family. When she meets Yuwen Yue she begins to train with him to become a spy and they eventually develop feelings for each other. Chu Qiao is the only one willing to believe in the Xiuli army, which once caused the fall of two of North Yan's largest cities.
Lin Gengxin	Yuwen Yue	He is the fourth master of the Yuwen Mansion and the heir to the Eye of God. He is a cold man of few words, intelligent, observant and an expert in martial arts. He is a powerful and high noble, who only cared about obeying his grandfather and following the strict rules of his family, however he is gradually influenced by Chu Qiao to be more kinder and soon becomes a fair and empathetic ruler. Yuwen Yue plays an important role in establishing peace in the new world, and although he loves Chu Qiao, he cannot show it openly due to the difference in their ranks, however he is always by her side when she needs him most.
Shawn Dou	Yan Xun	Prince of Northern Yan.He is the prince of North Yan, he is a prudent man and aware of his actions despite his cheerful and carefree facade, it caused him misfortune and pain for the loss of his entire family due to his identity as a captive prince. He forms an alliance with Chu Qiao and learns to trust her during the most difficult times. He also had a beautiful friendship and affection with Yuan Chun (who has always wanted to marry the prince); however, when he witnesses the destruction of his entire clan at the hands of the Wei Empire, he swears revenge and becomes in a bitter and cruel man, he uses Yuan Chun and distances himself from her, he has a great hatred towards the wei empire even the princes that he is willing to kill them, except for princess Yuan Chung (Chun'er) who was kind, attentive and caring with him, Yan Xun considers it and decides never to hurt her, but to take care of herself and be protected.
Li Qin	Yuan Chun / Chun’er	Princess of Western Wei.She is the princess of Western Wei, she is a kind, considerate, tender, simple and capricious young woman who is in love with Prince Yan Xun, however a series of circumstances, Yuan Chun changes her mind and refuses to marry him due to Yan's uprising. Xun, she suffered at the hands of Yan Xun's soldiers for rape and mistreatment, Yuan Chun believes that she was betrayed by her father who used her in her wedding with Yan Xun, the person who mattered most to her, this humiliation and pain causes her to become in an unrecognizable person, bitter, cold, vindictive and cunning, he starts to hate the wei emperor, Yuan Chun forms an alliance with Wei Shuye organizes an army to finish off the Xiulu troop, Yuan Chun manages to escape death several times due to sacrifice What do the people who love her do, so much is their suffering and pain that Yan Xun caused, she decides to kill him but she does not succeed, at the end of seeing Yan Xun again he sees him sad, asks her to forgive him and to please take care of herself much to him or that she cries so sadly remembering the moments together, she leaves and forgets it.

=== Supporting ===
==== Yuwen Manor ====
Actor	Character	Introduction
Kwok Fung	Yuwen Zhuo	Master of the 1st household, Yuwen Yue's grandfather. He is crippled due to a sacrifice he made for his loved one when he was young.
Chin Shih-chieh	Yuwen Xi	Master of the 3rd household, Yuwen Huai's grandfather. A creepy old man who preys on young female slaves.
Wang Dong	Yuwen Hao	Yuwen Zhuo's son.
Wang Yanlin	Yuwen Huai	Young master of the 3rd household. He is a sinister and manipulative man who is Yuwen Yue's biggest rival in power struggle. He was killed by Chu Qiao after saving the Xiuli Army.
Xing Zhaolin	Yue Qi	Yuwen Yue's trusted right-hand man; a loyal and capable warrior who fights alongside him.
Sun Yi	Yue Jiu	Yuwen Yue's guard.
Yuan Quan	Yue Shiwu	Yuwen Yue's guard.
Li Ang	Zhan Mou	Yuwen Zhuo's trusted confidante.
Fu Jia	Zhu Shun	Housekeeper of Yuwen household. He is under the control of Yuwen Huai and helps him execute his schemes.
Rain Lau	Madame Song	Head steward of Yuwen household. She is cruel and abusive toward Chu Qiao and the slaves.
Cao Xiyue	Jin Zhu	A maid at Qing Shan Court. She is actually a spy from Hong Shan Court and works for Yuwen Huai. She often picks on Chu Qiao due to her jealousy toward Chu Qiao and Yuwen Yue's relationship.
Wang Yu	Jin Si	A maid at Qing Shan Court; Jin Zhu's sidekick.
Li Chunyuan	Ah Luo	A maid at Qing Shan Court, who is on good terms with Chu Qiao.
Liu Yuqi	Ying Tao'er	An assassin sent by Yuwen Huai to kill Yuwen Yue.
Jiang Yiyi	Curly Hair	A maid of Yuwen Manor who was killed on the hunting ground.

==== Western Wei ====
Actor	Character	Introduction
Tian Xiaojie	Emperor of Wei	King of Wei. His distrust and suspicious nature caused him to destroy Yan Xun's family and kingdom.
Sun Ning	Royal Consort Wei (Ning'er)	Yuan Song and Yuan Chun's mother. She formed a friendship with Yuwen Zhuo, and often aids Yuwen Yue and Yan Xun.
Jin Kaijie	Yuan Qi (Prince Mu)	Third prince of Wei.
Jin Jia	Yuan Che (Prince Xiang)	Seventh prince of Wei. He is raised by Royal Consort Wei and is good friends with Yuwen Yue. He is also known for his war experience.
Niu Junfeng	Yuan Song (Prince Yu)	Thirteenth prince of Wei. He is bright, cheerful and kind-hearted. He likes Chu Qiao, despite all odds and circumstances thrown at him.
Huang Haige	Yuan Yang	Fourteenth prince of Wei. Son of Consort Zhao. He was used as a political tool by Yuan Chun.
Ying Lingjie	Yuan Hao	Fifteenth prince of Wei. Son of Lan Shuyi.
Nan Sheng	Lan Shuyi	A lady sent by Yuwen Huai to stay by the Emperor's side as a spy. She knows Chu Qiao's true identity and was entrusted by Luo He to take care of Chu Qiao.
Chen Yuanyuan	Jin Xin	Royal consort.
Zheng Shengli	Wei Guang	Head of Wei Pavilion, Royal Consort Wei's brother.
Jurai	Wei Shuyou	Young master of Wei family, Wei Guang's son.
Chen Sihan	Wei Shuye	Young master of Wei family, Wei Shuyou's cousin. He treats Yan Xun as his true friend, and has a one-sided love for Princess Yuan Chun.
Shi Jiantao	Zhao Gui	Head of Zhao Pavilion.
Jin Han	Zhao Xifeng	Young master of Zhao family, Zhao Gui's son. He is two-faced and manipulative.
Liu Yuan	Zhao Dongting	Young master of Zhao family, Zhao Xifeng's brother.
Zhang Rui	Jing Han	A cruel lord.
Lu Yongjun	Eunuch Wang	Emperor's personal eunuch.
Yang Liu	Cai Wei	Yuan Chun's personal attendant.

==== Northern Yan ====
Actor	Character	Introduction
Li Haohan	Yan Shicheng	Duke of Northern Yan. Yan Xun's father. He was sworn brothers with Emperor of Wei, but the latter's suspicions caused their relationship to turn sour.
Li Ying	Bai Sheng	Yan Shicheng's wife, Yan Xun's mother.
Wang Yitong	Yan Hongxiao	Yan Xun's sister.
Li Ruojia	Zhong Yu	Leader of Northern Yan's pugilistic forces. She is fiercely loyal to Yan Xun and aids him in his rise to power. She is in love with Wu Daoya.
Wang Zijie	Feng Mian	Yan Xun's personal attendant.
Hu Chunyoung	Cheng Chi	A general serving under Yan Xun. A ruthless man.
Wei Tianyang	Sun He	A general serving under Yan Xun, Cheng Chi's assistant.
Liu Kenan	Ah Jing	Yan Xun's subordinate.

==== Southern Liang ====
Actor	Character	Introduction
Deng Lun	Xiao Ce	Crown prince of Liang, and later the Emperor. He appears to be unruly but is sharp and intelligent. He is in love with Chu Qiao but keeps a distance for her sake and remains as her best friend who helps her when she's in need.
Huang Mengying	Xiao Yu	Elder princess of Liang, who is also the top spy of Liang. She wields a great responsibility of protecting her kingdom and family. She has mixed feelings for Yuwen Yue as her pen pal and archenemy.
Cao Xinyue	Qing Wei	A spy assassin of Liang, Xiao Yu's subordinate.
Zhao Xuanqi	Yin Xin	A spy assassin of Liang, Xiao Yu's subordinate. He tried to assassinate Chu Qiao in the past.
Sun Yi	Tao Yeji	A spy assassin of Liang, Xiao Yu's subordinate. She likes Zhao Xifeng.
Lu Qianxi	Lu'e	Xiao Ce's personal attendant.

==== Han Shan alliance ====
Actor	Character	Introduction
Ding Ziling	Luo He	Chu Qiao's birth mother. Leader of Han Shan alliance, Master of Feng Yun order.
Wang Xinghan	Zuo Mancang	A spy from Han Shan alliance. He disguises as the boss of a trading shop, but he actually sells deadly weapons.
Wei Lu	Snake Lady	A spy from Han Shan alliance. She is extremely loyal to Chu Qiao and saved her multiple times.
Hou Yansong	Dong Fangji	Yan Shicheng's military strategist. A spy from Han Shan alliance.
Hu Bing	Wu Daoya	A sage of Northern Yan. A good friend of Luo He, and the former strategist of Han Shan alliance. He later comes to assist Northern Yan army. He is in love with Zhong Yu.

==== Xian Yang ====
Actor	Character	Introduction
Huang Jiaqi	Xing Xing	A girl Chu Qiao met when she was in Xian Yang.
He Yucheng	Ouyang Mo / Mo'er	An orphan abandoned by the Ouyang family of Xianyang. He was adopted by Yuwen Yue.
Yu Aiqun	Ouyang Qian	Wealthiest merchant of Xianyang.
Dong Chunhui	Liang Shaoqing	A silly scholar who befriends Chu Qiao in Xianyang.
Yuan Ziyi	Meng Feng	A killer of Past Life Camp who later becomes a follower of Yuwen Yue.
Huang Haibing	Zhan Ziyu	A respected figure in the pugilistic world who is linked to the Past Life Camp.
Ma Ximi	Xia Chong	A killer of the Past Life Camp who resembles Chu Qiao, and whom was accused of killing Luo He when she in fact saved Chu Qiao. She is imprisoned by Xiao Yu.
Zhang Zhiwei	Tian Shoucheng	

==== Chu Qiao's family ====
Actor	Character	Introduction
Liu Bao		Chu Qiao (Jin Xiaolu)'s adoptive father.
Jia Shuyi		Chu Qiao (Jin Xiaolu)'s adoptive mother.
Peng Doudou	Jin Zhixiang	Chu Qiao's elder sister.
Ding Nan	Jin Linxi	Chu Qiao's fifth elder brother.
Miao Miao	Jin Xiaoqi	Chu Qiao's seventh younger sister.
Zhu Shengyi	Jin Xiaoba	Chu Qiao's eighth younger sister. She has a crush on Yuwen Yue.

==== Xiu Li Army ====
Actor	Character	Introduction
Ruan Shengwen	He Xiao	Chu Qiao's trusted subordinate. Second commander of the Xiuli army.
Huang Yi	Du Pingan / Du Gouzi	An ordinary young guy who joined the Xiuli army, and becomes a loyal follower of Chu Qiao.
Liu Yuhang	Ge Qi	Chu Qiao's loyal follower and soldier of the Xiuli army.

==== Bahatu ====
Actor	Character	Introduction
Kang Ning	Zha Ma	Princess of Bahatu.
Zhan Yunfeng	Zha Lu	Prince of Bahatu. Zha Ma's brother.
Zhang Haoran	Tu Da	Zha Ma's subordinate.

== Production ==
The series is directed by Wu Jinyuan (Chinese Paladin, Beauty's Rival in Palace, Scarlet Heart). The script is written by Yang Tao and Chen Lan, and reportedly took two years to be completed. Huang Wen (Tiny Times) acts as the style director, while Li Cai (Painted Skin: The Resurrection) serves as the stunt coordinator. The original soundtrack is composed by Roc Chen who worked on the soundtracks of Kungfu Panda 3.

Principal photography began on 30 May 2016, at Hengdian Studios, and wrapped up on 21 November 2016. Zhao reportedly lost 8 kg for her role. The filming set was opened to fans and the media for viewing in August.

== Soundtrack ==
No.	Title	Lyrics	Music	Singers	Length
1.	"Gaze (望)" (Opening theme song)	Liu Chang, Tan Xuan	Tan Xuan	Zhang Bichen & Zhao Liying	01:32
2.	"Burning Heart (心之焰)" (Ending theme song)	Lin Qiao, Zhang Ying	Luo Kun	G.E.M.	02:16
3.	"Star and Moon (星月)" (Chu Qiao and Yuwen Yue's relationship theme song)	Liu Chang, Cao Yun	Tan Xuan	Yisa Yu and Reno Wang	04:33
4.	"Unable to Learn (學不會)" (Chu Qiao's theme song)	Ni Shanshan	Lei Li, Tan Xuan	Xiang Xiang	04:16
5.	"Grassland (原上草)" (Chu Qiao's theme song)	Lin Qiao	Chen Xueran	Liu Xijun
6.	"The Furthest Heartbeat (最远的心跳)" (Yuwen Yue's theme song)	Liu Chang	Tan Xuan	Elvis Wang
7.	"Because of a Person (因为一个人)" (Yan Xun's theme song)	Tan Xuan, Cao Yun	Tan Xuan	Zhang Lei
8.	"Breaking a Persistent Thought (断执念)" (Yuan Chun's theme song)	Hua Tianqi	Chen Shimei	He Jie
9.	"When We Are Only Left With Me (當我們只剩下我)" (Chu Qiao's relationship theme song)	Duan Sisi	Tan Xuan	Zhang Xianzi

== Reception ==
On 26 June, the drama achieved a 2.01% rating with an audience share of 14.88%, according to National Average ratings. This set a record for a drama airing in a non-primetime time slot on a non-holiday weekday. The series also became the first Chinese drama to surpass 40 billion views while still airing. Princess Agents gained popularity in overseas markets as well. The series received praise for its distinctive storyline, strong performances, and its use of complex plot developments and scenic visuals.

Despite its commercial success and initial positive reception, the series later faced criticism regarding production quality, including the use of photoshop and green screen effects, an overly bright color palette, and inconsistent dubbing. The writing was also criticized for portraying the female protagonist as a "Mary Sue" beneath a facade on independence, as well as for incorporating unnecessary subplots and excessive screen time for minor characters, which some reviewers felt weakened pacing and narrative coherence. Additional controversy arose over the heavy emphasis on the second male lead’s storyline, leading some viewers to sarcastically refer to the series as “Yan Xun’s revenge story.” The drama was further criticized for concluding with a cliffhanger ending.

=== Ratings ===
Episode #	Original broadcast date	Average audience share (CSM52)		Average audience share (National Average)		Ranking on its timeslot
Episode #	Original broadcast date	Ratings	Audience share	Ratings	Audience share	Ranking on its timeslot
1–2	5 June 2017	0.841	5.526%	0.89%	7.27%	1
3–4	6 June 2017	0.937	6.430%	1.01	8.46%	1
5–6	7 June 2017	1.120	7.424%	1.37	10.27%	1
7–8	8 June 2017	1.273	8.354%	1.40	11.30%	1
9–10	12 June 2017	1.193	8.049%	1.15	9.680%	1
11–12	13 June 2017	1.400	8.139%	1.30	9.62%	1
13–14	14 June 2017	1.480	9.691%	1.36	11.13%	1
15–16	15 June 2017	1.233	7.957%	1.41	10.97%	1
17–18	19 June 2017	1.299	8.387%	1.28	10.09%	1
19–20	20 June 2017	1.246	7.930%	1.34	10.38%	1
21–22	21 June 2017	1.455	9.284%	1.60	12.63%	1
23–24	22 June 2017	1.584	9.793%	1.71	12.80%	1
25–26	26 June 2017	1.705	10.424%	2.01	14.88%	1
27–28	27 June 2017	1.815	10.922%	2.07	15.05%	1
29–30	28 June 2017	1.899	11.547%	2.05	14.78%	1
31–32	29 June 2017	2.125	12.556%	2.28	15.33%	1
33–34	3 July 2017	1.892	11.272%	1.94	13.66%	1
35–36	4 July 2017	1.785	10.560%	2.28	15.65%	1
37–38	5 July 2017	2.005	12.338%	2.24	15.84%	1
39–40	6 July 2017	1.936	11.488%	2.48	15.33%	1
41–42	10 July 2017	1.999	11.854%	2.09	14.52%	1
43–44	11 July 2017	2.236	13.051%	2.36	16.51%	1
45–46	12 July 2017	2.289	13.936%	2.82	18.99%	1
47–48	13 July 2017	2.193	12.993	2.86	19.29%	1
49–50	17 July 2017	2.277	13.312%	2.70	18.19%	1
51–52	18 July 2017	2.232	12.638%	2.71	18.04%	1
53–54	19 July 2017	2.525	14.644%	2.78	19.11%	1
55–56	20 July 2017	2.358	13.743%	2.68	17.83%	1
57–58	24 July 2017	2.137	12.441%	2.52	17.44%	1
59–60	25 July 2017	2.101	12.117%	2.55	17.56%	1
61–62	26 July 2017	2.199	13.585%	2.57	18.11%	1
63–64	27 July 2017	2.3457987253df	12.54%	2.86	19.12%	1
65	30 July 2017	0.794	7.250%	0.93	10.26%	1
66	31 July 2017	1.760	17.694%	1.64	19.28%	1
67	1 August 2017	1.841	16.964%	1.88	20.58%	1
68	2 August 2017	0.941	1.964%	0.18	10.58%	1
Average		1.741	10.84%	1.97	14.62%	1

Note: One week before the drama concluded its broadcast, Hunan Television altered its airing schedule, moving the series to Sunday-Tuesday at 23:00 CST in order to promote an upcoming drama during Princess Agents' original time slot. The change significantly affected ratings, as many viewers were unaware of the new schedule, and episodes were broadcast one hour later than usual.

=== Awards and nominations ===
Year	Award	Category	Nominated work	Result	Ref.
2017	Weibo TV Impact Festival	Drama of the Year	Princess Agents	Won	
2017	The First Annual Asian-American TV & Film Festival Golden Oak Award	Best TV Series	Princess Agents	Won	
2017	8th Macau International Television Festival	Best Actress	Zhao Liying	Nominated	
2017	11th Tencent Video Star Awards	Television Actress of the Year	Zhao Liying	Won	
2017	11th Tencent Video Star Awards	Most Popular Actor	Lin Gengxin	Won	

== Plagiarism allegations ==
The source novel 11 Chu Te Gong Huang Fei (11处特工皇妃), was alleged to have been plagiarized from several other works, including Novoland: Pearl Eclipse (斛珠夫人) by Xiao Ruqin, Novoland: Eagle Flag (九州缥缈录) by Jiang Nan and Kun Lun (昆仑) by Feng Ge, among others. In August 2015, the author Xia Xiang Dong'er admitted to the plagiarism allegations. In a public statement, she promised to provide a "clean" version of the novel, in which all plagiarized content would be removed, in order to ensure tha the adapted television series would not infringe upon the copyrights of the original authors.

When the television series was first released in June 2017, the original authors continued to allege that the adaptation contained plots and dialogue plagiarized from their works. Xiao Ruqin, author of Novoland: Pearl Eclipse (斛珠夫人), stated on Weibo that she intended to pursue legal action to protect the copyrights of the original works.

== International broadcast ==
Country	Network	Airing dates
China	Hunan TV, iQiyi	2017, 5–2 June, 017, 2 August
Malaysia	Astro Quan Jia HD	2017, 7 September
Singapore	CHK	2017, 2 October
Thailand	Channel 9 MCOT HD	2017, 9–2 December, 018, 18 March
Mexico	Imagen Televisión	2018, 11 November
Peru	Panamericana Televisión	2019
Colombia	Señal Colombia	2020, 26 March –
Bangladesh	Deepto TV	2023, 1 May –
