= Amour et Pâtisserie =

2013 Taiwanese television series

- Promotional poster
- Also known as: The Patisserie with No Name
- 沒有名字的甜點店
- Genre: Romance
- Created by: Public Television Service
- Written by: Gao Miao Huì; Yu Zhì Mín; Li Dìng Wei; Wen Cai; Wang Gong Cheng
- Directed by: Xu Fu Xiang
- Starring: Sandrine Pinna; Jasper Liu; Shiou Jieh-kai
- Opening theme: "Learning From Drunk" by Hebe Tien
- Ending theme: "Together in Love 同化" by Olivia Ong
- Country of origin: Taiwan
- Original languages: Mandarin; Taiwanese; Japanese; French
- No. of seasons: 1
- No. of episodes: 14

Production
- Producers: Huang Mao Chang; Wang Gong Cheng
- Production locations: Taiwan; France
- Cinematography: Ceng Xian Zhong曾憲忠; Wang Gong Cheng
- Running time: 90 minutes
- Production companies: Chimestone Digital Productions; Flash Forward Entertainment

Original release
- Network: PTS Channel
- Release: 25 May – 24 August 2013

Amour et Pâtisserie (Chinese: 沒有名字的甜點店; pinyin: Méi Yǒu Míng Zì De Tián Diǎn Diàn), also known as The Patisserie with No Name, is a 2013 Taiwanese romantic television series produced by channel PTS, starring Sandrine Pinna, Jasper Liu and Shiou Jieh Kai. The story is taken from Taiwanese actress and playwright Hannah Lin's "Television Program Playwriting Award" winning entry. Filming took place from July 26-November 15, 2012. First original broadcast began May 25, 2013 on PTS channel, airing every Saturday at 9:00-10:30 pm. The last of the 14 episodes was aired on August 24, 2013.

This was Jasper Liu's first drama as the male lead.

== Synopsis ==
A pâtisserie with no name, hidden in a residential area of Taichung, has a pastry chef that only makes three different desserts each day and each day is a surprise for the customers. In the shop, what is available depends on the chef's mood. However, life at the quiet shop changes when a backpacker, whose belongings have been stolen accidentally stumbles into the shop and refuses to leave, asking to work for room and board only.

== Cast ==
=== Main cast ===
- Sandrine Pinna as Chen Tian Tian

A talented Le Cordon Bleu trained pastry chef returns to Taichung and open a small pâtisserie after being heartbroken by her cheating boyfriend in Paris. Each day she only makes 3 kinds of desserts and what she makes depends on her mood. Besides running a pâtisserie, she has to care for her eldest sister's young illegitimate son, but life gets further complicated when she starts to lose her taste buds. Her feelings for who she likes becomes confuse when her ex-boyfriend Shang Yu Wen comes back into her life and Allen the new shop assistant at the pâtisserie shows interest in her.

- Jasper Liu as Allen

A backpacker who accidentally stumbles into the pâtisserie when his belongings are stolen. After being directed by Tian Tian of the nearest police precinct, he returns to the pâtisserie and ask if he could work there for room and broad. His happy go lucky attitude and handsome looks soon prove to be an asset to the pâtisserie as female customers starts frequenting the shop. He likes Tian Tian and sees her ex-boyfriend Shang Yu Wen as competition and a threat to his budding relationship with Tian Tian. He finds out by accident that his estranged father is the actual landlord of the pâtisserie.

- Shiou Jieh-kai as Shang Yu Wen

A talented and accomplished French pastry chef called the "Pride of Taiwan" by Taiwan food magazines and critics. He was Tian Tian's senior and boyfriend while they were studying together at the Le Cordon Bleu. After Tian Tian finds him cheating on her she leaves him without saying a word, regretful of letting her get away once he starts to pursue her again when he finds her in Taichung running a small nameless pâtisserie.

=== Supporting cast ===
- Debbie Huang as Chen Tian Xin

Chen Tian Tian's 2nd oldest sister. Always unlucky in love she sets herself up as a tarot card reader at the pâtisserie after getting over her latest heartbreak. She attracts a yakuza to the pâtisserie when she is responsible for an outstanding debt that one of her ex-lovers owes.

- Stephanie Chang as A Lou

A server at the pâtisserie. She likes to dress otaku and sometimes scantily clad, which causes male customers to stare at her. She later develops an attraction for the new chef assistant Cai Xiang Min.

- Michael Chang as Cai Xiang Min

An overworked insurance agent with an interest in French pastry. He collapses at work after being overworked by his scantily clad flirtatious boss, and is given a one-month vacation. During his vacation time he goes on a French pastry shop tour and stumbles into the pâtisserie. After taking one look at A Lou and tasting the desserts he ask to apply for the assistant chef position. He later quits his insurance job to work at the pâtisserie full time.

- Meggie Yu as Chen Tian Mi

Chen Tian Tian and Tian Xin's oldest sister. She is a famous drama actress who is unsatisfying with the roles her agent gets for her. She had a secret affair with a famous married romance novel writer, which resulted to the birth of their son Xiao Jie that Tian Tian raises as her own.

- Ma Hui Zhen as Mother Tian

Tian Tia, Tian Xin and Tian Mi's mother. She owns and runs a traditional Chinese bakery. When she finds out that she has a grandson by Tian Mi she ask to have Xiao Jie live with her.

- Ethan Luo as Xiao Jie

Tian Mi's illegitimate son from an affair she had with a married writer. Tian Tian raises him as her own until her mother finds out about him and ask that he live with her.

- Jacko Chiang as Qin Ye

A romance novelist who is known to be very devoted to his wife. He had a secret affair with Chen Tian Mi which resulted in a son.

- Ma Li Ou as Yakuza Boss

Originally went to the pâtisserie to collect an unpaid debt held responsible by Chen Tian Xin instead he falls in love with her upon meeting her and becomes one of the shops regular customers along with his followers.

- Sakamoto Chun Wha as A Mao

One of the Yakuza Boss's followers who dresses in a school girl sailor uniform.

- Kawase Miwako as A Gou

One of the Yakuza Boss's followers who dresses in a kimono.

- Zhang Fu Jian as Landlord

A kind middle aged man who took Tian Tian and Xiao Jie's in on a raining cold night. He lets her use his home as a pâtisserie rent free. Tian Tian pays regularly visits to him when he is in a nursing home. When Allem follows Tian Tian during one of her visits he finds out that the landlord of the pâtisserie is his estranged father.

=== Others ===
- Michael Shih as Liao Da Qiang

A taxi driver who is trying to retrace his deceased daughters favorite foods after finding her food journal.

- Huang Peijia as Liao's daughter

Liao Da Qiang's deceased daughter who dead of leukemia. After her father finds her food journal he tries to find out what was her favorite dessert.

- Steven Hao as Ah Kang (nicknamed Mr. Fingers)

A young man who has Asperger syndrome who is a regular at the pâtisserie. He works as a table setter at the same restaurant as Shang Yu Wen.

- Yan Yi Wen as Shou Zhi's mother

Ah Kang's overly protective mother. She request the pâtisserie not to sell anymore desserts to her son.

- Hope Lin as Teacher Xiao Yang

Xiao Jie's kindergarten teacher who develops a friendship with Allen.

- Fan Kuang-yao as Bai Lao Hui

A veteran actor who is on the same drama as Chen Tian Mi. He is also unhappy with the roles his agent gets for him.

- Ann Wu as Mei Dai Zi

A regular at the pâtisserie who is also a fan of Allen.

- Jing Li as Ying Ying

A regular at the pâtisserie who is also a fan of Allen.

- Hannah Quinlivan as Lin Jia Yi

A dance student that went to the pâtisserie with her boyfriend. She has an eating disorder.

- Fu Meng-po as Lin Jia Yi's boyfriend

Lin Jia Yi's boyfriend who is also a food blogger. He does not know his girlfriend has an eating disorder.

- Janel Tsai as Jin Ni

A socialite that hires Shang Yu Wen's pastry team to cater her party.

- Xu Min Rong as Zai Nan
- Kawahara Tetsuya as Tian Xin's boyfriend

Tian Xin's cheating boyfriend who lied to her that he would marry her when he has a fiancee on the side already.

- Hu Tian Lan as Gourmet
- Xu Hao Xiang as Food reporter

A reporter for a food magazine that uses bullying tactics to get his story. When the staff at the Patisserie don't comply to his demands he writes a false negative article about the Patisserie.

- An Wei Ling as Junior food reporter

A junior food reporter that works at the same magazine as the reporter that wrote a false article about the Patisserie. She reminds her senior how a reporter should write their subjects.

- Liu Ke Mian as Assistant manager
- Chen Lin Lin as Agent
- Kasai Kenji as paparazzi
- Lin Yu Zhi as Kai Wen
- Zhou Heng Yin as Xiang Min's manager
- Chen Yu Mei as Allen's mother
- Lin Yi Xuan as Bride
- Wu Xiang Cheng as Best man
- Mini Tsai as Rookie reporter

== Broadcast ==
Network	Country	Airing Date	Timeslot
PTS	Taiwan	May 25, 2013	Saturday 9:00-10:30 pm
PTS HD	Taiwan	May 31, 2014	Friday 9:00-10:30 pm

== Episode ratings ==
Air Date	Episode	Episode title	Average Ratings
May 25, 2013	1	Banana Chocolate Cake	-
June 1, 2013	2	Baba au Rhum	-
June 8, 2013	3	Chocolate Mousse	-
June 15, 2013	4	Bûche de Noël	-
June 22, 2013	5	Macaron	-
June 29, 2013	6	Fruit Tart	-
July 6, 2013	7	Madeleine	-
July 13, 2013	8	Galette des Rois	0.60
July 20, 2013	9	Mango Croque-en-bouche	0.55
July 27, 2013	10	Mont Blanc Part 1	0.59
August 3, 2013	11	Mont Blanc Part 2	0.31
August 10, 2013	12	Canelé	0.49
August 17, 2013	13	Pear Bread Pudding	0.51
August 24, 2013	14	Dessert Capital	0.68
Average ratings		-	0.53 (Ep.7-14)

== Awards and nominations ==
Year	Ceremony	Category	Nominee	Result
2014	49th Golden Bell Awards	Best TV Series Program	Amour et Pâtisserie	Nominated
2014	49th Golden Bell Awards	Best TV Series Actress	Sandrine Pinna	Nominated
2014	49th Golden Bell Awards	Best TV Series Screenplay	Gao Miao Huì, Yu Zhì Mín, Li Dìng Wei, Wen Cai, Wang Gong Cheng	Nominated
