= Detective Dee: The Four Heavenly Kings =

2018 Chinese-Hong Kong film by Tsui Hark

- Theatrical release poster
- Directed by: Tsui Hark
- Screenplay by: Chang Chia-lu; Tsui Hark
- Story by: Chen Kuo-fu; Tsui Hark
- Produced by: Chen Kuo-fu; Nansun Shi; Jerry Ye; Tsui Hark; James Wang
- Starring: Mark Chao; William Feng; Kenny Lin; Ethan Juan; Sandra Ma; Carina Lau
- Cinematography: Choi Sung-fai
- Edited by: Li Lin; Tsui Hark
- Music by: Kenji Kawai
- Production companies: Huayi Brothers; Film Workshop; CKF Pictures
- Distributed by: Huayi Brothers; Cine Asia (UK); IM Global (USA); Youku; Wanda Pictures
- Release dates: June 28, 2018 (Fantasia); July 27, 2018
- Running time: 132 minutes
- Countries: China; Hong Kong
- Language: Mandarin
- Box office: $262,963 (USA)

Detective Dee: The Four Heavenly Kings (traditional Chinese: 狄仁傑之四大天王; simplified Chinese: 狄仁杰之四大天王) is a 2018 action-adventure fantasy mystery film directed, produced, co-edited and co-written by Tsui Hark, and the third film in his Detective Dee film series. Despite dropping the "Young Detective Dee" title, it is a sequel to 2013's Young Detective Dee: Rise of the Sea Dragon, and as such similarly acts as a prequel to the first installment, Mystery of the Phantom Flame. Like its immediate predecessor, it was a Chinese-Hong Kong co-production and filmed in 3D.

Mark Chao, William Feng, Kenny Lin and Carina Lau reprise their roles from previous films, alongside newcomers Ethan Juan and Sandra Ma. It was released on July 27, 2018 in China, as well as in the United Kingdom, Australia, and New Zealand.

== Plot ==
Following the events of Rise of the Sea Dragon, Dee Renjie (Mark Chao) was appointed to head the Court of Judicature and Revision (Da Li Si) and conferred the prestigious "Dragon Taming Mace" by Emperor Gaozong (Chien Sheng). Hence, he became a threat to Empress Wu Zetian's (Carina Lau) quest for ultimate authority. Empress Wu assigns the head of the royal guard, Yuchi Zhenjin (Feng Shaofeng) to lead a group of mercenary sorcerers to steal the mace from Dee. Yuchi begrudgingly agrees under the condition that Dee must not be harmed or punished; however, Wu has secretly assigned the sorcerers to kill Dee. Knowing that Wu would try to eliminate him, Dee has hidden the mace and later on goes into hiding himself, to foil her plans and uncover the conspiracy against him.

Dee tasks Yuchi with finding the hidden Dragon Taming Mace, whereby he encounters one of the sorcerers, whom he kills in battle. Since Dee cannot be found, Wu fires him from his position as head of the Da Li Si and declares him a wanted criminal. After Yuchi returns the Dragon Taming Mace, she promotes the leader of the sorcerers, San Zang (Xian Gao), to the imperial court. While the latter demonstrates his powers, a dragon statue seemingly comes to life, killing two of the other sorcerers and producing a mass panic. Wu blames Yuchi for promoting Zang and killing several officers and has him arrested. Dee enters the palace in disguise, frees Yuchi and concludes that the living dragon was in fact a mass illusion, and that the true culprit had killed Zang beforehand and took his place. Furthermore, the two seemingly dead sorcerers were also part of the scheme and faked their deaths.

It turns out that the empress was controlled by the adversaries with an illusion and false promises of absolute power, and that the true culprits are a vengeful cult of Indian sorcerers, the "Wind Warriors", whom the previous emperor had used to come to power but killed and mutilated afterwards. Dee has the royal family hidden and enlists the help of Shatuo Zhong (Lin Gengxin) and the defected sorcerer Moon Water (Sandra Ma) to convince the powerful Zen Master Yuan Ce (Ethan Juan) in combating the army of illusionists and their leader, "Faceless Monster" (Wei Jia). In the ensuing battle at the Da Li Si, the powerful illusions of Faceless Monster prove too strong for Dee and his men, until Yuan Ce appears and defeats the leader of the Wind Warriors. Afterwards, Dee and Yuchi are reinstated in their positions.

== Cast ==
- Mark Chao as Di Renjie
- William Feng as Yuchi Zhenjin
- Kenny Lin as Shatuo Zhong
- Carina Lau as Empress Wu Zetian
- Ethan Juan as Master Yuan Ce
- Sandra Ma as Moon Water

== Production ==
=== Writing ===
In a March 2017 interview with South China Morning Post, Tsui said that "this third film required almost the same amount of time it took us to come up with the first. We began working on Four Heavenly Kings when we finished the script for the second film, but until this day we're still making revisions to the screenplay. The reason [for the delay] is that I want to finally pull off what we didn't manage to do in the first two films". Hark said that he frequently had to ask playwright Chang Chia-lu to rewrite the script.

In an interview in May 2018, cast member Feng Shaofeng said that the film's story was "about the darkness of humanity. The movie features a very complex case which involves a lot of people. Dee will face his most powerful enemies".

=== Filming ===
Filming started in March/April 2017, and concluded in early August. Feng Shaofeng stated that "when I finished filming for [Rise of the Sea Dragon], I was asked if I would like to act in the third sequel. I said 'yes'. But I had to wait a very long time and was once worried I might be replaced by someone else".

Executive producer Chen Kuo-fu commented that Tsui came up with "many new ideas" during productions, resulting in an increase in the cost of the film, but that Huayi Brothers' founder and CEO Wang Zhonglei approved the new budget "based on his trust in Tsui to deliver a new hit".

== Release ==
The film was released in China on July 27 in IMAX. It premiered the same day in both Australia and New Zealand, following selected advanced screenings the previous day, and in the United Kingdom.

It premiered in Quebec on June 28 at the Fantasia International Film Festival. It was released in France on August 8, 2018 in approximately 130 theaters. First announced to be in high frame rate, the French release was made at the standard frame rate.
