= The Legend of Shen Li =

2024 Chinese television series

- Official poster
- Genre: Xianxia; Romance
- Based on: Accompanying the Phoenix by Jiulu Feixiang
- Written by: Jiulu Feixiang
- Directed by: Deng Ke
- Starring: Zhao Liying; Lin Gengxin
- Ending theme: "Like the Beginning" (如初) by Zhang Bichen
- Country of origin: China
- Original language: Mandarin
- No. of seasons: 1
- No. of episodes: 39

Production
- Executive producers: Wang Juan; Xu Jia; Zhao Liying
- Producers: Li Eryun; Hu Bo; Zheng Zhongli; Li Xiaobiao
- Production location: Hengdian World Studios
- Cinematography: Liu Bin
- Running time: 45 minutes
- Production companies: Tencent Penguin Pictures; New Classics Media

Original release
- Network: Tencent Video; Hunan TV; Mango TV
- Release: 18 March – 5 April 2024

The Legend of Shen Li (Chinese: 与凤行; pinyin: Yǔ Fèng Xíng) is a 2024 Chinese television series based on the web novel Accompanying the Phoenix by Jiulu Feixiang. It stars Zhao Liying and Lin Gengxin in leading roles. The series premiered on Tencent Video, WeTV, Mango TV and Hunan TV on March 18, 2024.

On April 1, 2024, the popularity exceeded 31,000 heat index on Tencent.

== Synopsis ==
In order to avoid her political marriage with the Heavenly Emperor's grandson, Shen Li escapes from Immortal realm. While escaping, she engages into a battle with the generals of Immortal realm. After injuring herself in the battle, Shen Li transforms into her original form: a Phoenix and falls into mortal realm where she meets a mortal man named Xingyun.

== Cast and characters ==
=== Main ===
- Zhao Liying as Shen Li
  - Feng Xueya as young Shen Li
- Lin Gengxin as Xing Zhi / Xing Yun
  - Qiu Wenbin as young Xing Zhi

=== Supporting ===
==== Immortal Realm ====
- Zeng Li as Shen Muyue

Ruler of Immortal Realm and Shen Li's master

- Xin Yunlai as Mo Fang

General of Immortal Realm and Shen Li's confident

- Zhou Xiaochuan as Shang Bei

General of Immortal Realm

- Chen Zhen as Zhu Fei

General of Immortal Realm

- Yang He Wen as Chi Rong

General of Immortal Realm and Shen Muyue's subordinate

- Liu Yu as Qing Yan

General of Immortal Realm and Shen Muyue's subordinate

- Chen Luxi as Rou Ya, Shen Li's attendant
- Li Haoxuan as Zi Xia

General of Immortal Realm who died to a Chimei

- Peng Biyao as Zi Xia's wife
- Chen Yutong as A Nuan, Zi Xia's daughter

==== Divine Realm ====
- Liu Guanlin as Heavenly Emperor
- He Yu as Lord Fu Rong

Grandson of the Heavenly Emperor and Shen Li's fiancé

- Liu Yuze as Heavenly Emperor's attendant
- Qin Xiaofei as Immortal Lord Wen Liu, Fu Rong's friend

Extranatural Heaven Realm

- Li Zefeng as Qing Ye
- Liu Chang as Qian Ji

==== Mortal Realm ====
- Dong Jie as Yun Niang, a woman who lost her husband to war
- Song Ningfeng as Zhou Sanlang, Yun Niang's husband who ascended to immortality
- Li Zifeng as Gu Chengjin, second young master of Qingsheng City
- Huang Yi as Xiao He, lotus spirit raised by Gu Chengjin
- Hu Dandan as Ye Shi, Gu Chengjin's wife
- Yao Yiqi as Gu Chengrui, first young master of Qingsheng City

Others

- Xue Yilun as Hu Lu, earth immortal who saved Xing Yun

=== Others ===
- Xuan Lu as Shen Li's mother

== Production ==
Filming of the drama began in Hengdian World Studios on June 14, 2022 and the whole drama shooting was completed on November of the same year.

== Soundtrack ==
No.	English title	Chinese title	Artist	Notes
1.	"Like the Beginning"	如初	Zhang Bichen	Ending theme song
2.	"Lifetime"	世世	Liu Yuning	
3.	"Burning Heart"	炽心	Curley G	
4.	"Won't Return"	不知返	Wang Heye	
5.	"Bi Cang"	碧苍	Jess Lee	
6.	"Mutual Admiration"	两相思	Liu Mu	
