= Frant Gwo =

Chinese filmmaker (born 1980)

- 郭帆
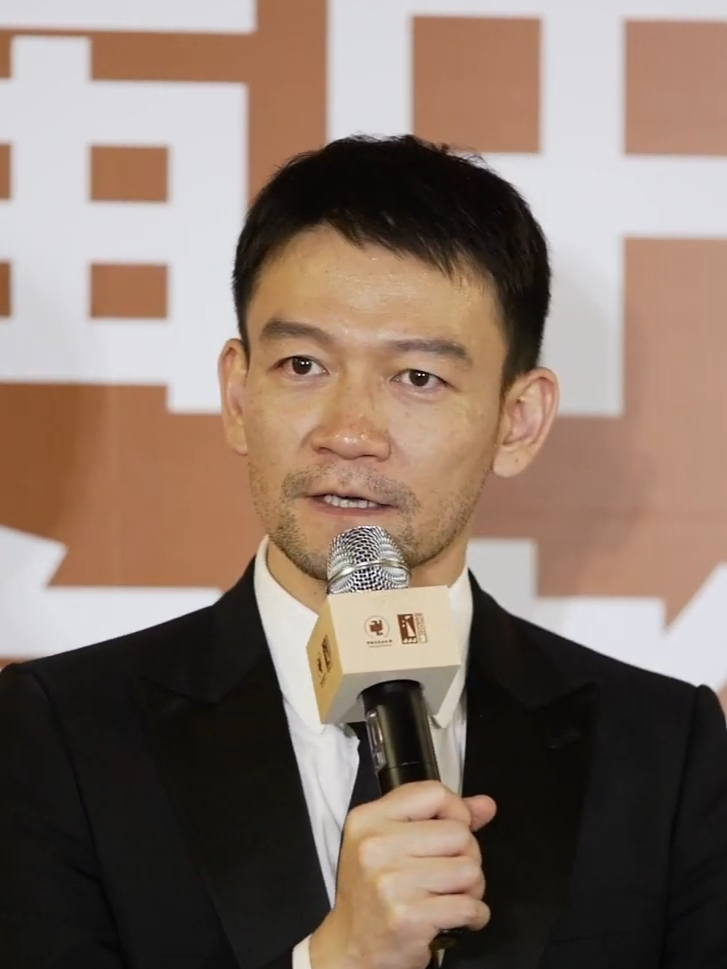
- Gwo at the 36th Golden Rooster Awards Ceremony
- Born: Guo Fan; 15 December 1980 (age 45); Jining, Shandong, China
- Education: Hainan University, Beijing Film Academy
- Occupation: Filmmaker
- Notable work: My Old Classmate, The Wandering Earth

Chinese name
- Chinese: 郭帆
Transcriptions
Standard Mandarin
- Hanyu Pinyin: Guō Fān
- IPA: [kwó fán]

Guo Fan (Chinese: 郭帆; pinyin: Guō Fān; born 15 September 1980), credited as Frant Gwo in Latin script, is a Chinese filmmaker. Gwo debuted as a director in 2011 with the film Lee's Adventure, and then directed the box-office hit My Old Classmate in 2014. In 2019, he directed China's first big-budget science fiction film, The Wandering Earth, which became one of the highest-grossing Chinese films of all time, garnering national acclaim. Its sequel, The Wandering Earth 2, was first released in China globally on 22 January 2023.

== Early life ==
Frant Gwo was born Guo Fan on 15 December 1980 in Jining, Shandong, China. During his early childhood, he developed an interest in painting, and in 1983, he studied at the Jining Municipal Bureau of Expression. In 1987, Guo enrolled at the Experimental Primary School in Jining, Shandong. Four years later, in 1991, he won the championship in the National Children's Calligraphy and Painting Competition.

Gwo went on to study at Jining No. 13 Middle School in 1993 and Jining No. 1 High School in 1995 before entering Hainan University in 1998 to study law. Beginning in 2000, Gwo spent much of his time creating manhua comics and graphic design. Instead of pursuing a legal career after graduation, he began working for the Asian Music Center program of China Travel Television in 2002 as a program packaging supervisor in Hainan. He later worked for Republic Culture Media Ltd. in Beijing.

After seeing James Cameron's Terminator 2: Judgment Day in theatres in the 1990s, Gwo was inspired to pursue a career as a sci-fi movie director. In 2009, he entered Beijing Film Academy to study film management.

== Career ==
In 2002, he graduated from the university with a bachelor's degree in law, and after graduation, he worked in the "Asia" column group of China Tourism Satellite TV as a program packaging supervisor in Hainan.

In 2007, the graphic design work "Are you hot?" won the Gold Award in the Peace Organization "+gettyimages" Global Public Service Advertising Design World Competition; in the same year, he worked for Gonghe Culture Media (Beijing) Co., Ltd.

In 2010, Gwo began making his first film, Lee's Journey (李献计历险记), which was theatrically released in 2011. In 2014, his second feature film, My Old Classmate, was released. It was a box office hit, earning 470 million yuan in China and winning multiple awards, including the Committee Special Award at the 21st Beijing College Student Film Festival.

In 2016, Gwo was chosen to direct The Wandering Earth, China's first big-budget science fiction film, based on a short story by the Hugo Award-winning author Liu Cixin. The film was released by China Film Group Corporation on 5 February 2019, the Chinese New Year's Day. It was a major box-office hit, grossing US$700 million worldwide, including US$691 million in China. The film became China's second highest-grossing film of all time, though it was surpassed later the same year by the animated fantasy film Ne Zha, and again in 2021 by the comedy film Hi, Mom. It is currently China's sixth highest-grossing film of all time.

A sequel to The Wandering Earth was announced in 2019 following the film's success. Gwo is still the director of The Wandering Earth 2, and the film was first released in China globally on 22 January 2023, the New Year's Day of the Chinese New Year (the Year of the Rabbit).

== Stylistic and cultural influences ==
Gwo has cited Western sci-fi movies including Christopher Nolan's Interstellar, Stanley Kubrick's 2001: A Space Odyssey, and James Cameron's Terminator 2 as major inspirations for his career as a sci-fi movie director and particularly in his work on The Wandering Earth.

When making The Wandering Earth, Gwo kept the Chinese audience in mind first, and built upon themes that would be most familiar to Chinese audiences, such as the filial dynamic between father and son. Gwo views the plot of The Wandering Earth itself to be a representation of Chinese cultural values, pointing out that when faced with an extraterrestrial threat, the heroes choose to find a way to take the whole Earth out of danger, embodying Chinese collective values of community and homeland, rather than searching for a new home on their own, as would be the more 'American', individualist approach.

Gwo took special care in designing the sci-fi aesthetics of The Wandering Earth, keeping in mind China's historical lack of an industrial revolution when designing the colors and technological structures seen in the film. His on-screen interpretation of the advanced technological setting of the film has been compared to a 'Trojan Horse' to entice Western audiences, which then compels the audience to consider themes that are more common to Chinese storytelling and cinema, such as social togetherness and solidarity.

== Filmography ==
Year	English title	Chinese title	Notes	Ref.
2011	Lee's Adventure	李献计历险记	Directorial debut	
2014	My Old Classmate	同桌的你		
2019	The Wandering Earth	流浪地球	Sixth highest-grossing film in China	
2020	The Sacrifice	金刚川		
2023	The Wandering Earth 2	流浪地球2	Released on January 22, 2023	
