= Lin Gengxin =

Chinese actor

- 林更新
- Born: February 13, 1988 (age 38); Shenyang, Liaoning, China
- Other name: Kenny Lin
- Education: Shanghai Theatre Academy
- Occupation: actor
- Years active: 2009–present
- Agents: Tangren Media (2010–2012); Lin Gengxin Studio (2013–present)

Chinese name
- Chinese: 林更新
Transcriptions
Standard Mandarin
- Hanyu Pinyin: Lín Gēngxīn

Lin Gengxin (Chinese: 林更新; pinyin: Lín Gēngxīn, born on February 13, 1988), also known as Kenny Lin, is a Chinese actor. Lin rose to fame for his role in Scarlet Heart (2011), and has starred in movies such as Young Detective Dee: Rise of the Sea Dragon (2013), My Old Classmate (2014), The Taking of Tiger Mountain (2014) and Journey to the West: The Demons Strike Back (2017) as well as television series Princess Agents (2017) and The Legend of Shen Li (2024).

Lin ranked 77th on Forbes China Celebrity 100 list in 2015, 43rd in 2017, and 84th in 2019.

== Early life ==
Lin was born in Shenyang, Liaoning, China. He enrolled in the Shanghai Theatre Academy in 2007. During his college years, Lin appeared in low-budget films, television shows, short films and advertisements.

== Career ==
=== 2011–2013: Rising popularity ===
In 2011, Lin rose to fame with the hit drama Scarlet Heart, playing the role of 14th Prince Yinti. In 2012, Lin co-starred in xianxia drama Xuan-Yuan Sword: Scar of Sky, which was extremely popular during its run and raised his profile. In 2013, Lin successfully made his crossover to film with his role in Tsui Hark's Young Detective Dee: Rise of the Sea Dragon. He was nominated for the Best New Actor award at the 33rd Hong Kong Film Awards.

=== 2014–present: Commercial success ===
In 2014, Lin starred in youth romance film My Old Classmate with Zhou Dongyu. The film was a commercial success, and won the Jury Prize at the 21st Beijing College Student Film Festival. The same year, he starred in crime action film Black & White: The Dawn of Justice; and reunited with Tsui Hark in the period action film The Taking of Tiger Mountain. The Taking of Tiger Mountain was a success, becoming one of the highest-grossing films of all time in China with US$150 million.

In 2015, Lin was cast in Chinese historical drama God of War, Zhao Yun, based on the Chinese novel Romance of the Three Kingdoms. He plays General Zhao Yun, who falls in love with a girl named Xiahou Qingyi (played by Girls' Generation's Im Yoona). The drama premiered in April 2016, and reached viewership ratings as high as 2%, and recorded more than 10 billion hits through various Chinese online videos sites. The same year, Lin headlined action comedy For a Few Bullets and martial arts film Sword Master. He also featured in Zhang Yimou's historical fantasy epic The Great Wall.

In 2017, Lin starred in Stephen Chow's Journey to the West: The Demons Strike Back, playing Sun Wukong. The film grossed $239.5 million, becoming the highest-grossing film among the Journey to the West novel adaptations. The same year, he starred in historical action drama Princess Agents. The drama was a massive hit, and Lin gained renewed recognition for his portrayal of the male lead, Yuwen Yue.

In 2018, Lin reprised his role as Shatuo Zhong in Detective Dee: The Four Heavenly Kings, the third installment of the Detective Dee film series by Tsui Hark.

In 2019, Lin was cast in the crime suspense drama Lost and Love as a policeman.

In 2022, Lin starred in the romance and fantasy drama The Legend of Shen Li, which was aired on March 18, 2024, on Hunan Television, Tencent Video, and Mango TV. This drama was also Lin and Zhao Liying's second collaboration after their first drama Princess Agents in 2017.

== Filmography ==
=== Film ===
Year	English title	Chinese title	Role	Notes	Ref.
2009	The Immemorial Magic	玩命魔术	Tong Xing		
2011	The Blue Cornflower	蓝色矢车菊	Nan Haitian		
2013	Young Detective Dee: Rise of the Sea Dragon	狄仁杰之神都龙王	Shatuo Zhong		
2014	Just Another Margin	大话天仙	Lin Chong	Cameo	
2014	My Old Classmate	同桌的你	Lin Yi		
2014	Black & White: The Dawn of Justice	痞子英雄2	Chen Zhen		
2014	The Taking of Tiger Mountain	智取威虎山	Shao Jianbo		
2015	Jian Bing Man	煎饼侠	Himself	Cameo	
2016	For a Few Bullets	快手枪手快枪手	Xiao Zhuang		
2016	Sword Master	三少爺的劍	Hsieh Shaofeng / Ah Chi		
2016	The Great Wall	長城	General Chen		
2017	Journey to the West: The Demons Strike Back	西游伏妖篇	Sun Wukong		
2017	What A Day!	有完没完	Xiao Xin	Cameo	
2018	Detective Dee: The Four Heavenly Kings	狄仁杰之四大天王	Shatuo Zhong		

=== Television series ===
Year	English title	Chinese title	Role	Network	Ref.
2011	Scarlet Heart	步步惊心	Yinti	Hunan TV	
2012	Xuan-Yuan Sword: Scar of Sky	轩辕剑:天之痕	Zhang Lie	Hunan TV	
2012	Drama Go! Go! Go!	姐姐立正向前走	Tong Shaotian	Hunan TV	
2013	Dancing Legend	舞乐传奇	Burmese Prince Shu Nanda	CCTV	
2016	God of War, Zhao Yun	武神赵子龙	Zhao Zilong	Hunan TV	
2017	Princess Agents	楚乔传	Yuwen Yue	Hunan TV	
2020	Lost and Love	最初的相遇，最后的别离	Yan Jin	Youku	
2021	My Bargain Queen	我的砍价女王	Sheng Zhening		
2022	Master of My Own	请叫我总监	Lu Jiming	Youku; Dragon TV	
2024	The Legend of Shen Li	与凤行	Xing Zhi / Xing Yun	Tencent	

=== Variety show ===
Year	English title	Chinese title	Role	Ref.
2015	Challenger Alliance	挑戰者聯盟	Cast member	
2017	Baby, Let me go	放开我北鼻第二季	Cast member	
2017	Three Yard	三个院子	Cast member	
2018	Clash Bots	机器人争霸	Cast member	
2022	The New Journey	新游记	Cast member	
2024	Mystery in the Box	盒子里的猫	Cast member	
2024	Natural High	现在就出发	Recurring member	

== Discography ==
Year	English title	Chinese title	Album	Notes	Ref.
2017	"Love In A Life Time"	一生所爱	Journey to the West: The Demons Strike Back OST	with Yao Chen	

== Awards and nominations ==
Year	Award	Category	Nominated work	Results	Ref.
2011	Sohu Internet TV Festival	Best New Actor	Scarlet Heart	Won	
2012	Sohu TV Drama Awards	Best Newcomer	Scarlet Heart	Won	
2012	6th Tencent Video Star Awards	Newcomer of the Year	Scarlet Heart	Won	
2012	8th Huading Awards	Best New Actor	Scarlet Heart	Nominated	
2012	1st iQiyi Award Ceremony	Best Newcomer	Scarlet Heart	Won	
2012	1st iQiyi Award Ceremony	Most Popular Actor	Scarlet Heart	Won	
2014	12th Huading Awards	Best Supporting Actor	Young Detective Dee: Rise of the Sea Dragon	Nominated	
2014	33rd Hong Kong Film Awards	Best Newcomer	Young Detective Dee: Rise of the Sea Dragon	Nominated	
2014	14th Chinese Film Media Awards	Most Anticipated Performance	Young Detective Dee: Rise of the Sea Dragon	Nominated	
2014	9th Chinese Young Generation Film Forum Awards	Best New Actor	My Old Classmate	Won	
2014	11th Guangzhou Student Film Festival	Most Popular Actor	My Old Classmate	Won	
2015	15th Chinese Film Media Awards	Most Anticipated Actor	My Old Classmate	Nominated	
2017	11th Tencent Video Star Awards	Most Popular Actor	Princess Agents	Won	
2018	10th Macau International Movie Festival	Best Supporting Actor	Detective Dee: The Four Heavenly Kings	Nominated	
