= Sun Tsui-feng =

Taiwanese opera performer (born 1958)

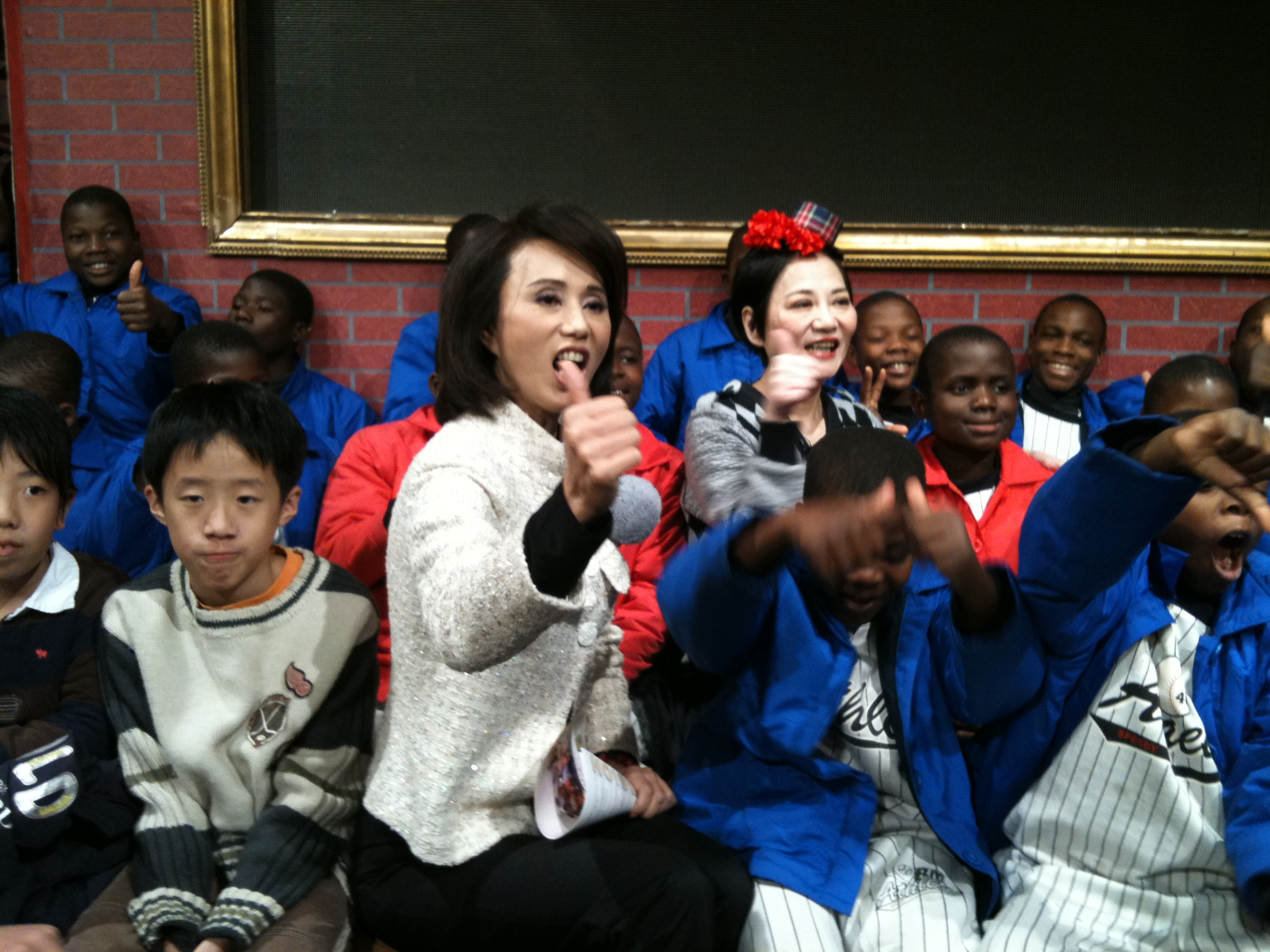
Tsui-feng Sun and Hsiao-yen Chang at The Primary School.

Sun Tsui-feng (Chinese: 孫翠鳳; born 19 December 1958) is a Taiwanese opera performer and one of the most renowned stage actresses in Taiwan. Despite entering this profession at 26 years old — much later than other traditional opera artists — and growing up in a Mandarin-speaking rather than a Taiwanese Hokkien-speaking household, Sun overcame layers of difficulty and emerged as a leading sheng (male) role impersonator for the Ming Hwa Yuan opera troupe in the 1980s. She has also starred in a large number of non-musical films and TV series, including the 2006 TV series The Grandmaster's Daughter (祖師爺的女兒) which is based on her 2000 autobiography.

== Filmography ==
=== Film ===
| Year | English title | Original title | Role | Notes |
|---|---|---|---|---|
| 1980 | The Frogmen | 大地勇士 | | |
| 1982 | Steamrolling | 人肉戰車 | | |
| 1983 | Armed Schoolgirls | 女學生與機關槍 | | |
| 1987 | Auntie Jinshui | 金水嬸 | | |
| 1988 | Osmanthus Alley | 桂花巷 | | |
| 1994 | The Tofu Maker Had a Dream | 我的一票選總統 | | |
| 2007 | Mazu | 海之傳說—媽祖 | | Voice acting |
| 2009 | Young Spirit of a Taiwanese Opera Singer | 青春歌仔 | | |
| 2016 | Like Life | 人生按個讚 | Mazu | |
| 2022 | Salute | 我心我行 | | |

=== Television series ===
| Year | English title | Original title | Role | Notes |
|---|---|---|---|---|
| 1992 | The Jiaqing Emperor Tours Taiwan | 嘉慶君遊台灣 | Jiaqing Emperor | Cross-gender acting |
| 1995 | Huangfu Shaohua and Meng Lijun | 皇甫少華與孟麗君 | Meng Lijun | Taiwanese opera series |
| 1997 | The Sweet-Potato Touring Inspector | 大巡按蕃薯官 | Jin Zhongwen | |
| 1997 | Big Sister in Charge | 大姐當家 | Ye Yingshu | |
| 1997 | The Strange Cases of Lord Shi | 施公奇案 | Tang Shengnan | |
| 1998 | The Female Touring Inspector | 女巡按 | Bao Xiuxiu | |
| 1999 | The Bird in the Rain | 雨中鳥 | Zhu Fengying | |
| 2002 | Fan Lihua | 移山倒海樊梨花 | Fan Lihua | |
| 2005 | Oath of Eternal Love | 海誓山盟 | Ye Mingzhu | |
| 2006 | The Grandmaster's Daughter | 祖師爺的女兒 | Hong Xiuping | Based on her autobiography |
| 2012 | Eminent Monks | 菩提禪心 | | Taiwanese opera series |
