= Kayako =

English software company

Kayako Ltd.
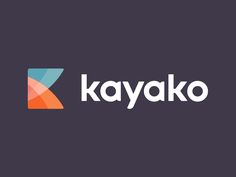
- Company type: Private
- Headquarters: London
- Founders: Varun Shoor; Jamie Edwards
- Website: www.kayako.com
- Launched: 2001

Kayako is a customer service software company based in London, United Kingdom. Kayako builds customer service and help desk software which businesses use to talk to and support their customers. Kayako was founded in 2001 in Jalandhar, India and has since relocated its headquarters in London, United Kingdom. In addition to its London location, the company has offices in Gurgaon, India, and Singapore.

The company now serves 50,000 customers in over 100 countries, including Peugeot, De Beers, NASA, and the American Motorcyclist Association.

Kayako was cited as a direct competitor in Zendesk's (another help desk software company listed on the New York Stock Exchange) S-1 IPO filing with the Securities Exchange Commission.

== History ==
Kayako was established in 2001 by Varun Shoor, who formed the company and its first office in his hometown of Jalandhar, India after dropping out of college. Shoor learned to program when he was 13 years old, and started work on Kayako at the age of 17.

Kayako is bootstrapped and has not taken any external investment, which is rare for a Software as a Service (SaaS) startup. However, in 2014, Kayako was reported to be in talks with Helion Venture Partners to raise investment.

=== Viber website compromise ===
In July 2013, Viber's online help desk, hosted by Kayako, was hacked and defaced by the Syrian Electronic Army. Viber determined that the compromise was related to a compromise of an individual's account password, and not a security vulnerability in the Kayako application itself.

=== ESW Capital acquisition ===
On February 14, 2018, Kayako announced that it had been acquired by ESW Capital, a private equity firm based in Austin, Texas.
