= John Yuyi =

Taiwanese visual artist

Chiang Yu-yi (Chinese: 江宥儀; pinyin: Jiāng Yòuyí; born February 21, 1991), professionally known as John Yuyi, is a Taiwanese visual artist. Her practice explores aspects of the social media, photography, and the post internet. She lives and works in Taipei and New York City.

== Early life and education ==
Chiang Yu-Yi was born in Taipei. She studied Fashion Design with a Bachelor of Arts/Science at the Shih Chien University. Since the beginning of her career, she has had a significant online presence, on platforms like Facebook and Instagram. Before working as an artist, John Yuyi worked as an intern for Jason Wu, an assistant editor at a fashion magazine, and as a model.

== Style ==
=== Early work ===
In a 2014 swimwear collection project, John Yuyi connects her fashion design education with graphic content creation. For this project, she chooses not to categorize herself purely in either mediums of fashion or photography.

=== Recent work ===
Marie Claire Taiwan describes her style as fashionably exaggerated. John Yuyi focuses on millennial culture, and utilizes the internet as a medium to increase her online presence. Her process in creating artworks is usually rather simple. In some of her works, she uses a lot of temporary body tattoos on her skin, and then documents the result. John Yuyi describes her style as fun, unpredictable, and bizarre. Regarding the strong performative action in her projects, she said that she has difficulties translating her thoughts to words. Most of her projects allow her to "ease [her] anxiety". She agreed that the products that she sells go beyond the product itself, and that they are symbols and documentations of her artistic actions.

Yuyi has been invited for collaboration with international brands for creative campaigns and commercials projects such as Gucci, Nike, Maison Margiela, and Carven.

In 2023 she collaborated with the social enterprise known as THE SKATEROOM, printing a series of her artworks on limited edition skateboards.

== Work ==
=== Skin on Skin, 2016 ===
Skin on Skin is a photo piece where John Yuyi pastes temporary tattoos of nude self portraits on the skin of pork cuts. John Yuyi described the art making process as "random… tricky and fun", similar to her experience making an earlier piece Face Post, 2015. ( in 2016)

=== GUCCI meme, 2017 ===
In March 2017, Gucci and John Yuyi released a collaborative campaign photo series on Instagram where John Yuyi utilized her temporary tattoos in reference to the apparatus of Gucci's Instagram page. Gucci writer Samantha Culp describes the photo series "expanded to include 'likes', messages, avatars and logos, inking our very flesh, even temporarily, with the digital structures we inhabit and are now a part of us." The collaboration caught widespread internet attention, and in an interview with BBC regarding the project, she further discusses the nuances of being an artist of the post-internet world, and also how art making helps with her anxiety and bipolar disorder.

=== I Tree To Call You, 2018 ===
I Tree To Call You is a site specific installation work with temporary stickers of John Yuyi's text message conversations applied upon the leaves of a live tree. The usage of a live tree in an artificial human space reflects John Yuyi's experience engaging in the virtual world. Taipei Dangdai writes "the carried messages on the fallen leaves then become an aphorism in the destiny of someone else in another relationship." I Tree To Call You was first shown during her Gallery Vacancy in 2018, and was later a feature installation at Taipei Dangdai in 2019.

== Exhibitions ==
=== Solo exhibitions ===
- John Yuyi, Zürich, Christophe Guye Galerie, 2022
- The Next Gen: John Yuyi, New York, The Art Vacancy, 2018
- My (Temporary) Self, Los Angeles, Make Room, 2018
- John Yuyi, Shanghai, Gallery Vacancy, 2018

=== Selected group exhibitions ===
- Why Didn't You Like My Pic?, Taipei, OFFTOPIC, 2016
- Undergarments, Sydney, 2017
- Taipei Dangdai, Taipei, 2019
- SUPERFAN, Gallery Madé van Krimpen Amsterdam, 2024

== Awards ==
Forbes 30 Under 30 - Asia - The Arts 2018
