= My Old Classmate =

- Film poster
- Directed by: Frant Gwo
- Written by: Gao Xiaosong; Ao Li; Song Jinchuan
- Produced by: Gao Xiaosong
- Starring: Zhou Dongyu; Lin Gengxin
- Cinematography: Liu Yin
- Edited by: Cheung Ka-fai
- Music by: Gao Xiaosong
- Production companies: Skywheel Entertainment; Beijing Enlight Pictures
- Release date: April 25, 2014 (China)
- Running time: 98 minutes
- Country: China
- Language: Mandarin
- Box office: US$73 million

My Old Classmate (Chinese: 同桌的妳) is a 2014 Chinese coming-of-age drama film directed by Frant Gwo and starring Zhou Dongyu and Lin Gengxin. It tells of the romance between two deskmates spanning across 20 years. The film was released on April 25, 2014.

== Cast ==
- Zhou Dongyu
- Lin Gengxin
- Mike Sui
- John Bueno
- Wang Xiaokun
- Gong Geer
- Li Mincheng
- Zhao Siyuan
- Cao Yang
- Michael Gralapp
- Zhang Zifeng

== Reception ==
The sleeper hit grossed $51.2 million in 10 days. It earned a total of US$73 million internationally. Variety praised the film for its lack of artistic pretension and its clever use of truisms, which makes it stand out among other films of the same genre.

== Awards and nominations ==
| Year | Award | Category | Recipient | Result |
|---|---|---|---|---|
| 2014 | 21st Beijing College Student Film Festival | Committee Special Award | My Old Classmate | Won |
| 2014 | 11th Guangzhou Student Film Festival | Most Popular Film | My Old Classmate | Won |
| 2014 | 11th Guangzhou Student Film Festival | Most Popular Actor | Lin Gengxin | Won |
