= Leslie Kee =

Singaporean photographer based in Japan (born 1971)

Leslie Kee (born 5 April 1971) is a Singaporean photographer based in Japan.

== Early life ==
Leslie Kee was born on 5 April 1971, in Singapore. His biological parents were never legally married; His father is a Japanese business man, who visited Singapore and met Kee's mother, who is Singaporean and worked at a bar. She got pregnant when she was 23 years old. She raised Kee and his younger sister on her own as a single mother. Kee and his mother lived in a one-room housing estate in Tiong Bahru. They were very poor and have no relatives around to help them up. He attended Bukit Ho Swee East School and Victoria School. In his early education, Kee was reserved and seldom spoke in school. When Kee was 13 years old, a few months before her death, Kee's mother gave him a Minolta camera — it later proved to be Kee's influence in becoming a photographer. Kee took a job at a Japanese electronics factory from 13 years old to 19 years old. After his mandatory conscription in the army for 2 years at 21 years old, Kee saved all his money to relocate his life to Japan, a country which had greatly inspired him since his teenage years.

== Career ==
Arriving in Tokyo in 1993, Kee was faced with a language barrier. To overcome it, he learned the Japanese language at a local institution. Kee worked 3 jobs every day for 5 years, he was well known for sleeping 3 hours per day since he was young. Kee saved his money and managed to apply to pursue his dream as a photographer at Tokyo Visual Arts School, majoring in photography, graduating in 1997. He was jobless for around a year, until in 1998, when the famous Hong Kong City Magazine hired him to work on a cover shoot featuring Asia no.1 actor Takeshi Kaneshiro. The magazine company Vogue Taiwan, impressed with Kee's skills, offered him to be the first Asian photographer contributor for the first Vogue magazine in Asia. Since then for almost 20 years, Kee has been shooting for VOGUE.

Known for his kinetic fashion images, celebrity portraits and art nudes, photographer and film director Leslie Kee lives and works in Tokyo and also New York for 10 years. as a commercial director and photographer with works published in VOGUE, GQ, ELLE, Harper’s Bazaar, L'Officiel, ESQUIRE, Rolling Stone Magazine, V and many others.

Kee's celebrity portraits include Madonna, Lady Gaga, Beyonce, Pharrell Williams, Jennifer Lopez, Yoko Ono, Steven Tyler, Kate Moss, One Direction, Karl Lagerfeld, Jay Chou, Zhang Ziyi, Yoshiki, Jackie Chan, Ayumi Hamasaki and Yumi Matsutoya.

His advertising clients include Gap, H&M, Adidas, Shiseido, Levi's, Esprit, Lexus, Isetan, Uniqlo, Tiffany, Rakuten, Softbank and Yohji Yamamoto.

For his first charity photobook SUPER STARS (2006), he donated all the proceeds through the World Vision Organisation, for the victims of the Sumatra Tsunami Earthquake. For his fifth charity photobook LOVE & HOPE (2011), which benefits the Great East Japan Earthquake and donated all the proceeds to the victims, he was awarded the 40th APA METI Minister’s Award. Kee is well known for producing and creating charity art books and photo exhibitions, with famous celebrities around the world, to raise money and awareness, to help the needs. Kee has published and held more than 100 photobooks and photo exhibitions in 20 years.

Kee was invited as the first photographer in Asia to be a main speaker for Ted Talk in 2014.

In 2015, Kee started the big project Out In Japan, to support LGBT in Asia. Kee has been known to be single since his whole career as a photographer. Currently, he has been endorsed as the official photographer for the Tokyo 2020 Olympics Paralympics portrait messages project, collaborating with NHK Broadcasting.

Kee's works are well received in New York and Paris but he chose to fly back to Asia after 10 years living in New York. Kee has been recognised as the most influential fashion and portrait photographer in history of art and photography in Asia. He lifework has been inspiring and influencing young artists to pursue their dreams especially students in Japan, China, Singapore, Korea and the entire South East Asia.

== Personal life ==
Kee once dated and married a Japanese woman. After his career took off, their marriage gradually deteriorated, and they decided to end it.

On November 22, 2020, Kee held a wedding party with his American partner, Joshua Vincent Ogg in Japan. They had previously obtained a same-sex partnership certificate in Shibuya Ward, Tokyo in September of that year.

== Photo exhibitions ==
PRESENT BY LESLIE KEE (2001 August)

SUPER ICON/SUPER FANTASY（2005 May)

SUPER STARS（2006 November）

SUPER STARS in OSAKA（2006 December）

SUPER STARS in HONG KONG（2007 February）

SUPER STARS in SINGAPORE（2007 May）

FACES OF LOVE（2008 June）

SUPER TOKYO（2010 April）

MUSE OF TOKYO BY LESLIE KEE（2010 August）

TOKYO LOVE STORY BY LESLIE KEE（2010 November）

SUPER 流行通信 （2011 February）

SUPER 流行通信 in MILAN（2011 April）

SUPER 流行通信 in OSAKA（2011 May）

LOVE & HOPE（2011 May）

MUSIC BY LESLIE KEE（2011 August）

LOVE & HOPE + FIVE in HONG KONG（2011 September）

SUPER MIYUKI MATSUDA（2011 October）

FOREVER YOUNG（2011 November）

SUPER LADY GAGA（2011 November）

SUPER AKI KOMATSU（2011 November）

SUPER AKIYAMA（2011 November）

POWER PEOPLE BY LESLIE KEE（2012 February）

SUPER JIN AKANISHI（2012 February）

COLORS OF HOPE（2012 March）

SUPER A/X HOPE（2012 MArch）

SUPER MAMA（2012 April）

SUPER AFRICA（2012 May）

SUPER AI TOMINAGA（2012 July）

SUPER ZUCCA（2012 September）

SUPER YOHJI YAMAMOTO（2012 September）

YUMING FOREVER（2012 December）

SUPER DSQUARED2（2013 March）

SUPER BARNEYS NEW YORK (2013 August）

SUPER LOVE（2013 October）

SUPER KEITA MARUYAMA (2014 August）

歌劇 2010-2014 -100th TAKARAZUKA REVUE- (2015 January）

SUPER TGC (2015 April）

OUT IN JAPAN x GAP (2015 April）

SUPER Y-3 ADIDAS (2015 June）

SUPER YOHJI YAMAMOTO issue 3（2015 September）

OUT IN JAPAN x 1000 LGBT (2016 July）

SUPER YOHJI YAMAMOTO issue 4（2016 September）

MODE & MUSE Parco Photo Exhibition （2017 March）

SUPER YOHJI YAMAMOTO issue 5（2017 September）

YOHJI YAMAMOTO homage Photo Exhibition（2018 September）

WE ARE LOVE Photo Exhibition（2018 November）

BOOKISH Leica Photo Exhibition（2019 February）
