= The Chrysalis =

- Directed by: Qiu Chuji
- Written by: Qiu Chuji; Koni Lee; Tan Jinhua; An Yuxiang; Ma Yumeng
- Produced by: Qiu Chuji
- Starring: Sandrine Pinna; Ren Quan; Lee Wei; Cui Jie
- Cinematography: Jeffrey Chu
- Edited by: Qiu Chuji; Han Feng
- Music by: Cincin Lee
- Production company: Yellapapa Pictures
- Release date: February 1, 2013 (China)
- Running time: 98 minutes
- Country: China

The Chrysalis is a 2013 Chinese horror film directed by Qiu Chuji.

== Cast ==
- Sandrine Pinna as Guan Wenxin
- Ren Quan as Luo Jia
- Lee Wei as Wu Guangming
- Cui Jie as Dr. Dai
- Wendy Gao as Wendy, Annie's elder sister
- Christa Yan as Dai Anni/Anne
- Zhan Chuheng as Chunshan
- Sun Jun as Hui
- Liu Shengyue as Sheng
- Xiao Xi as Sheng's mother
- Zhuang Wenyan as fourth aunt
- Li Wenlong as Mao
- Wu Jing as a real estate agent

== Release ==
A novel of the film was written by director Qiu Chuji and writer Menga Lee was published in December 2012. The film was released in China on February 1, 2013.

== Reception ==
Film Business Asia gave the film a six out of ten rating, referring to the film as "Intriguing but unfocused psycho-horror ranges from great to corny but remains watchable".
