= Fang-Yi Sheu =

Taiwanese-American dancer

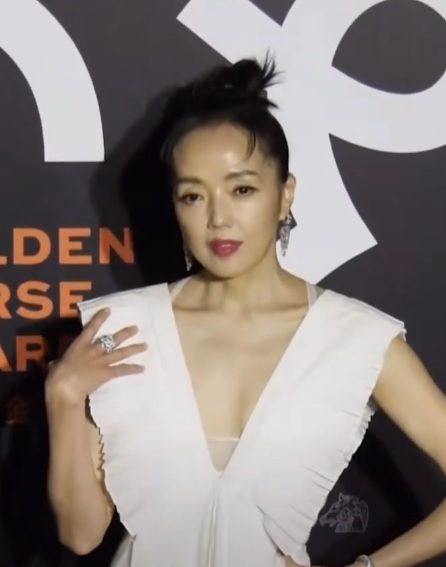
- Sheu at the 59th Golden Horse Awards in November 2022
- Born: 1971 (age 54–55); Yilan County, Taiwan
- Other name: Xu Fangyi
- Education: Taipei National University of the Arts
- Occupations: Dancer, choreographer
- Organization(s): Fang-Yi Sheu & Artists

Chinese name
- Traditional Chinese: 許芳宜
- Simplified Chinese: 许芳宜
- Hanyu Pinyin: Xǔ Fāngyí

Fang-Yi Sheu (Chinese: 許芳宜; born 1971) is a Taiwanese-American dancer and choreographer. She was a principal dancer with the Martha Graham Dance Company, then founded LAFA & Artists Dance Company with Bulareyaung Pagarlava in 2006 and Fang-Yi Sheu & Artists in 2011.

== Early life and education ==
Sheu was born in Yilan County, an agricultural area in northeastern Taiwan. Her father ran a pharmacy. she entered a local dance school at fourth grade, and later attended Hwa Kang Arts School in Taipei. She then studied at the National Institute of the Arts (now Taipei National University of the Arts) in Taipei, where she studied the Graham technique with Ross Parkes, a former Martha Graham Dance Company principal dancer.

== Career ==
In 1994, she moved to the U.S. to study dance, sponsored by the Council for Cultural Affairs. The following year, she joined the Martha Graham Dance Company in New York City, was promoted to soloist in 1995 and principal in 1997. She was praised by the New York critics, with some calling her 'finest present-day embodiment of the Graham technique and tradition." She returned to Taiwan in 2006.

In 2007, Sheu founded LAFA & Artists Dance Company with fellow Taiwanese dancer Bulareyaung Pagarlava, and performed at Jacob's Pillow Dance that year. The same year, she became an artist-in-residence with the Baryshnikov Arts Center. LAFA & Artists disbanded in 2010, and she returned to New York. In 2011, she founded Fang-Yi Sheu & Artists, which led to her working with dancers such as Wendy Whelan, Tyler Angle and Craig Hall, and choreographers such as Christopher Wheeldon and Akram Khan.

In Taiwan, Sheu started a campaign named "Body art" in 2012, which promotes dance to the general public.

In films, she appeared as a dance teacher in the 2012 film Touch of the Light, and as twin sisters, a princess and a Taoist nun, in the 2015 film The Assassin. Sheu also starred in and choreographed the dance scenes in the autobiographical film Salute; the film was released in 2022. For the film, Sheu won the Best Action Choreography at the 59th Golden Horse Awards.

== Recognition ==
Sheu was listed as one of Dance Magazine's "25 to Watch" in 2005. Also in 2005, she was awarded the Order of Brilliant Star with Cravat. She won the National Award for Arts at age 36, making her the youngest recipient of the award.
