= Young Detective Dee: Rise of the Sea Dragon =

2013 Chinese-Hong Kong film by Tsui Hark

- Theatrical release poster
- Directed by: Tsui Hark
- Screenplay by: Chang Chia-lu; Tsui Hark
- Story by: Chen Kuo-fu; Tsui Hark
- Produced by: Nansun Shi; Chen Kuo-fu; Tsui Hark; James Wang
- Starring: Mark Chao; William Feng; Kenny Lin; Ian Kim; Angelababy; Carina Lau
- Cinematography: Choi Sung-fai
- Edited by: Yu Baiyang
- Music by: Kenji Kawai
- Production companies: Huayi Brothers; Film Workshop
- Distributed by: Huayi Brothers; Emperor Motion Pictures
- Release date: September 28, 2013
- Running time: 133 minutes
- Countries: China; Hong Kong
- Language: Mandarin
- Box office: US$98,400,000

Young Detective Dee: Rise of the Sea Dragon (Chinese: 狄仁傑之神都龍王) is a 2013 action-adventure fantasy mystery film directed, produced, and co-written by Tsui Hark, which acted as a prequel to Tsui's 2010 film Detective Dee and the Mystery of the Phantom Flame. Taiwanese-Canadian actor Mark Chao takes over from Andy Lau as a young Dee Renjie, while William Feng, Kenny Lin, Ian Kim (in his Chinese debut), and Angelababy co-star alongside a returning Carina Lau from Mystery of the Phantom Flame, rounding up the ensemble cast. A Chinese-Hong Kong co-production, the film was shot in native 3D.

In Rise of the Sea Dragon, Di investigates the origins and nature of an attack against the Chinese fleet, believed to have been caused by a mysterious sea creature. A sequel of the film and the third installment of the Detective Dee series, titled Detective Dee: The Four Heavenly Kings, was released in 2018, with Chao, Feng, Lin, and Lau all reprising their roles.

== Plot ==
In 660, a Chinese fleet is attacked by a mysterious sea monster in the East China Sea, destroying many ships and leaving the remainder severely damaged. Empress Wu Zetian (Carina Lau) charges Yuchi (Feng Shaofeng), a member of the Ministry of Justice, to investigate the sea monster attacks, threatening him with execution if he does not succeed in ten days. The young Dee Renjie (Mark Chao) arrives in the Imperial Capital Luoyang, after receiving a recommendation to join the Court of Judicature and Revision (Da Li Si). By accident, he overhears a plan to kidnap the courtesan Yin Ruiji (Angelababy) as an offering to appease the sea monster. While Dee fights the kidnappers, Ruiji is taken by a different, humanoid sea creature, but she is rescued by Dee before the creature is able to escape with her. Upon arriving at the scene, Yuchi has Dee arrested and sends Ruiji into protective custody. In prison, Dee befriends medical assistant Shatuo (Lin Gengxin), who helps him escape.

Meanwhile, the creature visits the recovering Ruiji. Realizing the creature is her missing lover, tea manufacturer Yuan Zhen, she tries to communicate with him just as a group of masked thugs attack the house. Dee, Yuchi and Shatuo arrive to fight off the thugs. After rescuing Ruiji, Dee is suddenly attacked by Yuan, who was hiding on the wide eaves. As they fight, Ruiji suddenly stabs Dee and threatens to kill herself, causing Yuan to flee. Afterwards, Ruiji tells Dee the truth about Yuan. Deducing the clues, Dee comes to the realization that the attackers hail from the small, war-ridden nation of Dondo, and seek Yuan to poison the imperial tea and thus kill Emperor Gaozong (Chien Sheng) and his court. Dee, Shatuo and Ruiji find the hiding place of a feral Yuan and manage to subdue him. They take him to the imperial doctor Wang Pu, who administers a sedative. Doctor Wang Pu uncovers that Yuan's transformation has been caused by dung beetles and is able to cure him from the infestation. Once Yuan recovers, he recalls how he was poisoned by the Dondo leader for not taking part in his scheme. Wang Pu manages to produce an antidote, which can be distributed to the whole imperial court, thus averting the catastrophe.

Afterwards, they uncover the traitor within the Da Li Si and while chasing him, they encounter the sea monster, a gargantuan manta ray mutated by the Dondo by using parasites and poison. Meanwhile, Empress Wu imprisons Ruiji since she is from Fuyu Kingdom, but Dee makes a bargain with the Empress that if he captures the rebel leader within a day she will release Ruiji. Based on clues provided by Yuan, Dee and Yuchi deduce the island that the rebels must be hiding on and they land there at night, confronting the rebels; a fight ensues and Huo Yi (Dong Hu), the head of the Dondo rebels, is finally killed. While returning from the island, they encounter the sea monster, which attacks their fleet. Finally, they launch poisoned fish bait at the sea monster, who drags down the last ship but lets go as the poison takes effect, dying. The Da Li Si return victorious and Dee is awarded the prestigious "Dragon Taming Mace" by the Emperor, along with being named the new head of the Da Li Si. On the advice of Dee, the now-cured Yuan and Ruiji flee the city in order to avoid further conflict with the vengeful empress.

== Cast ==
- Mark Chao as Dee Renjie, who has come to the capital Luoyang to be an officer of the Da Lisi; while reporting for duty, he is imprisoned by Da Lisi Chief Minister Yuchi Zhenjin after saving the courtesan Yin Ruiji. Using his skills, Dee persuades Shatuo Zhong to releases him from prison, and together they, with the help of Yin Ruiji, solve the case.
- William Feng as Yuchi Zhenjin, the Chief Minister at Da Lisi; he is appointed by Empress Wu to investigate the Sea Dragon Case or forfeit his life in failure. The Da Lisi Chief is skilled in martial-arts and is destined to become both adversary and ally to Dee Renjie.
- Kenny Lin as Shatuo Zhong, a prison doctor and the apprentice of Imperial Doctor Wang; he uses his medical skills to assist the young detective in cracking the case.
- Ian Kim as Yuan Zhen, a teamaker and a handsome scholar; he is poisoned by the Dondo and forced to make Bird's Tongue tea as part of their plan.
- Angelababy as Yin Ruiji, the capital's most beautiful courtesan; saved by Dee Renjie and the lover of Yuan Zhen, Yin provides clues to the Sea Dragon case.
- Carina Lau as Empress Wu Zetian, the real Emperor-figure behind the Imperial Court at the start of her reign, reprising her role from the first film; she assigns Da Lisi Chief Minister Yuchi and later the young Detective Dee to crack the Sea Dragon case.
- Chen Kun as Doctor Wang Pu, Shatuo's teacher; he researches crazy poisons by experimenting them on his students. He let Shatuo to go to Da Lisi to obtain a fitted hand for his gorilla hand. He discovers how and why Yuan was poisoned.
