= Sandrine Pinna =

Taiwanese actress

- 張榕容
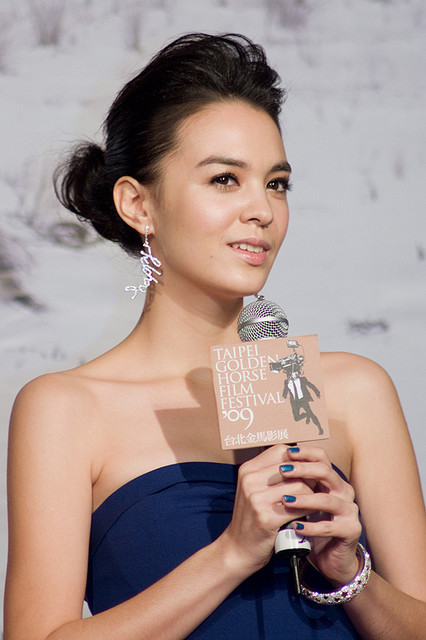
- Pinna in 2009
- Born: 10 April 1987 (age 39); Taipei, Taiwan
- Education: Shih Hsin University (BFA)
- Occupation: Actress
- Years active: 1997–present
- Spouse: Jeremy Ji (m. 2013)
- Children: 1
- Awards: 11th Taipei Film Festival; Best Actress ''Yang Yang'' – 2009 53rd Asia Pacific Film Festival; Best Actress ''Yang Yang'' – 2009

Chinese name
- Traditional Chinese: 張榕容
- Simplified Chinese: 张榕容
Transcriptions
Standard Mandarin
- Hanyu Pinyin: Zhāng Róngróng
- Wade–Giles: Chang^{1} Jung^{2}-jung^{2}
- Musical career
- Also known as: Chang Yung-yung

Sandrine Pinna (Chinese: 張榕容; pinyin: Zhāng Róngróng; Wade–Giles: Chang^{1} Jung^{2}-jung^{2}; born 10 April 1987) is a Taiwanese actress.

== Early life ==
Sandrine Pinna was born on 10 April 1987 to a Taiwanese mother and a French father, who was a lawyer. Her parents divorced when Pinna was young. Pinna was raised by her mother when her father returned to France, where he stayed until his death in May 2011.

== Career ==
Pinna started her career as a child model in advertisements. After earning a degree in radio, film and television from Shih Hsin University, she became an actor. Her notable films include Yang Yang, Miao Miao, Candy Rain, Touch of the Light, See You Tomorrow and Legend of the Demon Cat. She acted in the HBO Asia TV series Trinity of Shadows.

== Personal life ==
In February 2013, Pinna married Taiwanese singer-songwriter Jeremy Ji. Their daughter, Chantel, was born in August that year.

== Filmography ==
=== Film ===
Year	English title	Original title	Role	Note(s)
2001	Fluffy Rhapsody	起毛球了		Short film
2002	Drop Me a Cat	給我一隻貓	Wang Wei Wen's sister	
2006	Bicycle Ride	單車上路	Julia	
2006	Do Over	一年之初	Xiao Hui	
2008	Candy Rain	花吃了那女孩	U	
2008	Night Fall	天黑	Chieh	Short film
2008	Jail	百獄	Nuan-nuan	Short film
2008	Miao Miao	渺渺	Chen Ai Yuan / Xiao Ai	
2008	Universe Songstress	宇宙歌女	Alien	Short film
2008	Intoxicant	匿名遊戲	AAAAA	Short film
2008	Yang Yang	陽陽	Zhang Xin Yang	
2009	My Daddy My Hero	半熟爸爸	Mei	Short film
2010	Here Comes Fortune	財神到	Dong Jingjing	
2011	Rango	—N/a	Beans	Mandarin voice over
2012	Touch of the Light	逆光飛翔	Chieh	
2013	The Chrysalis	女蛹之人皮嫁衣	Guan Wenxin	
2015	Cities in Love	恋爱中的城市	Fan Li Sha Zhang	
2015	We Are Family	我們全家不太熟	Kaka	
2016	The Secret	消失愛人	Yanzi	
2016	At Cafe 6	六弄咖啡館	Miss Liang	Cameo
2016	Where Do Abused Children Go To	受虐兒去哪裡	Huang Li-yun	Short film
2016	The Secret Life of Pets	—N/a	Chloe	Mandarin voice over
2016	See You Tomorrow	擺渡人	Mao Mao	
2017	52Hz, I Love You	52赫茲我愛你	Qi	Cameo
2017	Legend of the Demon Cat	妖貓傳	Lady Yang	
2019	The Rookies	素人特工	Miao-miao	
2019	Welcome To The Beartown	逗愛熊仁鎮	Meng Hsiao-hsien	
2021	Never Stop	超越	Chi Yueh-yueh	
2021	Plurality	複身犯	Dr. Shen	
2024	Dead Talents Society	鬼才之道	Catherine	
2025	Luz	花明渡	Ren	

=== Television series ===
Year	English title	Original title	Role	Network
2001	Poor Prince	貧窮貴公子	Si Mei i.e. fourth sister	CTS
2002	City Hero	城市造英雄	P	
2007	Summer x Summer	熱情仲夏	Tina	CTS/GTV
2008	Police et vous	波麗士大人	Kindergraden teacher (ep 3-6)	TTV/SET
2008	Mysterious Incredible Terminator	霹靂MIT	Wen Xin Lan (ep 1)	GTV/FTV
2010	Endless Love	愛∞無限	Song Rui En	CTS/GTV
2013	Amour et Patisserie	沒有名字的甜點店	Chen Tian Tian	PTS
2016	Rock Records in Love	滾石愛情故事	Chu Chia-Ling	PTS/EBC
2019	Once Upon a Time in Lingjian Mountain	从前有座灵剑山	Wang Wu	iQIYI
2023	Living	有生之年	Xu Ya Xin	GTV/TVBS

=== Music video appearances ===
Year	Artist	Song title
1997	Andy Lau	"愛如此神奇" ("Love is Mysterious")
2009	Jam Hsiao	"我不會愛" ("Don't Know How to Love")
2009	Tanya Chua	"若你碰到他" ("If You Meet Him")
2012	Rainie Yang	"想幸福的人" ("Wishing For Happiness")
2015	Esther Liu	"謝謝我的我" ("Xie Xie Wo De Wo")
2016	JJ Lin	"只要有你的地方(晚安版)" ("By Your Side (Bedtime)")
2016	JJ Lin	"彈唱" ("A Song for You Till the End of Time")
2020	Hebe Tien	"諷刺的情書" ("The Irony of Love")

== Awards and nominations ==
Year	Award	Category	Nominated work	Result	Ref.
2008	Golden Horse Awards	Best Actress	Miao Miao	Nominated	
2009	Asian Film Awards	Best Newcomer	Miao Miao	Nominated	
2009	Taipei Film Awards	Best Actress	Yang Yang	Won	
2009	Asia Pacific Film Festival	Best Actress	Yang Yang	Won	
2009	Golden Horse Awards	Best Actress	Yang Yang	Nominated	
2010	Asian Film Awards	Best Actress	Yang Yang	Nominated	
2012	Taipei Film Awards	Best Actress	Touch of the Light	Won	
2012	Golden Horse Awards	Best Actress	Touch of the Light	Nominated	
2014	Golden Bell Awards	Best Actress	Amour et Patisserie	Nominated	
2017	Hong Kong Film Critics Society Awards	Best Actress	See You Tomorrow	Nominated	
2018	23rd Huading Awards	Best Supporting Actress	Legend of the Demon Cat	Won	
