= The Monkey King 3 =

2018 Hong Kong-Chinese film by Soi Cheang

- Theatrical release poster

Chinese name
- Traditional Chinese: 西遊記女兒國
- Simplified Chinese: 西游记女儿国
- Literal meaning: Journey to the West: Women Country
Transcriptions
Standard Mandarin
- Hanyu Pinyin: Xī yóu jì nǚ'ér guó
- Directed by: Soi Cheang
- Screenplay by: Elvis Man
- Based on: Journey to the West by Wu Cheng'en
- Produced by: Soi Cheang
- Starring: Aaron Kwok; Feng Shaofeng; Zhao Liying; Xiaoshenyang; Him Law
- Cinematography: Richard Bluck; Yang Tao
- Edited by: Yau Chi-wai
- Music by: Yu Kobayashi
- Production company: Filmko Entertainment
- Distributed by: Filmko Entertainment; China Film Group; Aeon Pictures Studios; IDragon Movies App
- Release date: 16 February 2018
- Running time: 114 minutes
- Countries: Hong Kong; China
- Languages: Mandarin; Cantonese
- Budget: RMB 550 (US$87 million)
- Box office: US$114.2 million

The Monkey King 3 is a 2018 fantasy film based on the novel Journey to the West by Wu Cheng'en. A Hong Kong-Chinese co-production, the film is the third installment of the Monkey King franchise, after The Monkey King (2014) and The Monkey King 2 (2016). Directed and produced by Soi Cheang, the film stars Aaron Kwok, Feng Shaofeng, Zhao Liying, Xiao Shenyang, and Him Law.

The film was released on February 16, 2018, the first day of the Chinese New Year holiday period. It received mixed reviews from critics.

== Plot ==
Sun Wukong (Aaron Kwok), Tang Sanzang (Feng Shaofeng), Zhu Bajie (Xiaoshenyang) and Sha Wujing (Him Law) – inadvertently enter the Womanland of Western Liang, a nation populated by women raised to believe that men are fatally deceptive in matters of the heart.

Love nevertheless blossoms between Tang Sanzang and the Womanland's young queen (Zhao Liying), even though her royal preceptor (Gigi Leung) is hell-bent on sentencing the men to death. As Sun Wukong, Zhu Bajie and Sha Wujing search for a way out of this nation surrounded by a vast magical net, it soon transpires that romantic love is the only key to opening the gate.

== Cast ==
- Aaron Kwok as Sun Wukong, the Monkey King
- Feng Shaofeng as Tang Sanzang, the Buddhist monk
- Zhao Liying as the Ruler of Women's Country
- Xiaoshenyang as Zhu Bajie, the pig demon
- Him Law as Sha Wujing, the water-buffalo
- Lin Chi-ling as Hebo
- Gigi Leung as Advisor
- Liu Tao as Guanyin
- Kingdom Yuen as Priest
- Cecilia So as young advisor
- Sire Ma

== Production ==
=== Casting ===
Zhao Liying was cast in the role of the Ruler of Women's Country. The original cast members of The Monkey King 2: Aaron Kwok, Feng Shaofeng, Xiaoshenyang and Him Law reprised their roles as Sun Wukong, Tang Sanzang, Zhu Bajie and Sha Wujing respectively in the film. Liu Tao, Lin Chi-ling, and Gigi Leung joined the cast for this installment, with Liu Tao reprising her role as Guanyin from Journey to the West (2011). Feng Shaofeng also previously portrayed the role of Erlang Shen in Journey to the West (2011) as well. Him Law previously portrayed Muzha in the first installment.

=== Filming ===
Hollywood talent Shaun Smith (300, I am Legend, the previous installment) returned as the special makeup effects supervisor/designer for this film. Principal photography began in December 2016 and concluded in early April 2017.

== Release ==
The Monkey King 3 was released in China on February 16, 2018.

== Reception ==
On review aggregator Rotten Tomatoes, the film has an approval rating of 29% based on seven reviews, and an average rating of 4.8/10. On Metacritic, which assigns a normalized rating, the film has a weighted average score of 51 out of 100 based on 4 critics, indicating "mixed or average reviews". On Tianjin Maoyan Culture Media's ticketing website the film has received a 7.8/10 from the audience based on over 240,000 reviews.

Elizabeth Kerr from The Hollywood Reporter believes that the film is "bonker(s), but in a charming, delirious sort of way" with "enough eye-catching set pieces". As for actors, Aaron Kwok delivers a "strong performance...that's far more nuanced than it needs to be", while "Feng and Zhao are a less than riveting couple, making their dilemmas leaden soap opera instead of compelling crises of conscience or identity". She also points out that even the Queen's still "begging for the men's help" and notes that The Monkey King 3 is missing its opportunity to make the female characters "active-not-reactive".

Chinese critic Raymond Zhou regards The Monkey King 3 as inferior to its predecessor, The Monkey King 2. He criticized that the CGI effect is more credible than the story is and that both of two romantic leads have no chemistry. He commented that Feng Shaofeng's performance is reliable among leads.

Film critic Derek Elley, however, credits The Monkey King 3 as "the most engaging of the three films on a character level, with a relaxed tone and often silly humour that also help to bolster its "human" face". Xuanzang's role is "always a difficult one to bring off amid such colourful company (Aaron Kwok, Xiaoshenyang, and Luo Zhongqian)", but Feng Shaofeng "manages to make Xuanzang sympathetic"; Zhao fails to "dominate the film as her character should"; Gigi Leung "grabs the spotlight" while her character is not "fully-drawn"; Lin Zhiling "has a couple of memorable moments in the CGI-heavy finale".
