= The Monkey King 2 =

2016 Hong Kong-Chinese film by Soi Cheang

- Theatrical release poster

Chinese name
- Traditional Chinese: 西遊記之孫悟空三打白骨精
- Simplified Chinese: 西遊记之孙悟空叁打白骨精
- Literal meaning: Journey to the West: Monkey King Thrice Confronts the White Bone Spirit
Transcriptions
Standard Mandarin
- Hanyu Pinyin: xī yóu jì zhī Sūn Wùkōng sān dǎ báigǔjīng
Yue: Cantonese
- Jyutping: Sai1 Jau4 Gei3 Zi1 Syun1 Ng4 Hung1 Saam1 Daa2 Baak6 Gwat1 Zing1
- Directed by: Soi Cheang
- Written by: Ran Ping; Ran Jianan; Wen Ning; Yan Yiyi
- Based on: Journey to the West by Wu Cheng'en
- Produced by: Kiefer Liu
- Starring: Aaron Kwok; Feng Shaofeng; Xiaoshenyang; Him Law; Gong Li; Fei Xiang; Kelly Chen
- Cinematography: Yang Tao; Cheung Man-po
- Edited by: Angie Lam; Yau Chi-wai; Lu Xin
- Music by: Christopher Young
- Production company: Filmko Entertainment
- Distributed by: Filmko Pictures; China Film Co Ltd. Jiangsu Anshi YingNa Film Distribution; Aeon Pictures Studio (international)
- Release dates: 20 January 2016 (Beijing premiere); 6 February 2016 (Hong Kong); 8 February 2016 (China)
- Running time: 119 minutes
- Countries: Hong Kong; China
- Languages: Mandarin; Cantonese
- Budget: US$60–60.5 million
- Box office: US$193.7 million

The Monkey King 2 (Chinese: 西遊記之孫悟空三打白骨精) is a 2016 action fantasy film based on the classic 16th-century novel Journey to the West by Wu Cheng'en. A Hong Kong-Chinese co-production, the film was shot in 3D and is a sequel to the 2014 box office hit The Monkey King with Soi Cheang returning as director and Sammo Hung as action director, who replaces Donnie Yen's role from the previous franchise.

The film stars Aaron Kwok, who portrayed the main antagonist in the previous franchise, as the film's titular protagonist, who also replaces Yen from the previous franchise. Other cast for the film included Feng Shaofeng, Xiao Shenyang, Him Law, Fei Xiang, Kelly Chen, and Gong Li.

The film was released in the United States on 5 February 2016, in Hong Kong on 6 February and in China on 8 February 2016 during the Chinese New Year period. Received mixed to positive reviews from critics, a sequel, The Monkey King 3, was released in China during the Chinese New Year period in 2018.

== Plot ==
500 years after Sun Wukong's (Aaron Kwok) imprisonment under the Five Fingers Mountain, a young Buddhist monk Tang Sanzang (Feng Shaofeng) sets out for a journey to the Thunder Monastery in India to collect Buddha's scriptures. When he is attacked by a tiger, he is forced to free Wukong and the Monkey King learns that he has to protect the monk throughout the journey, because the Bodhisattva Guanyin ensured he would be bound by an enchanted circlet that can cause him pain whenever Tang Sanzang chants a certain sutra. Soon the duo meet Zhu Bajie (Xiaoshenyang), a lustful pig demon, and Sha Wujing (Him Law), a djinn-like monk. He fights a dragon, defeats it and transforms it into a horse as his mount.

The company travel to the Yun Hai Xi Kingdom, a land terrorized by the White Bone Demon (Gong Li) who has been eating people in order to extend her unnatural life and avoid the Wheel of Reincarnation. As the demoness learns about Sanzang, she decides to eat him in order to stop her reincarnation cycle and achieve everlasting demonhood. She takes the appearance of an old woman and lures the group into a cottage in the woods. To prevent Wukong from using his truth-seeking eyes to see through her disguise immediately, she throws tainted dust into his eyes that clouds his sight. Then while her disguised minions keep Wukong, Bajie and Wujing occupied, the demoness tells Sanzang a story about how she was forced to marry as a young girl, and when her village suffered famine, the people blamed her for it, even calling her an evil demon, and attempted to kill her as a sacrifice to the gods. As Tang comforts the old lady, she attempts to kill him, but is stopped by Wukong. The demoness escapes before Wukong can deal the killing blow and leaves the dead body of the old lady behind. Sanzang and the others don't believe Wukong that all the women he murdered were demons, and blame him for killing the innocent. Sanzang punishes Wukong by chanting the sutra and causing the circlet to tighten painfully on his head. Afterwards, Sanzang climbs to the top of a mountain where Wukong is sulking. Sanzang tells Wukong he thinks they are both very alike, for they both only trust what their own eyes see. But together, they are better able to discern the truth. This is why they were all chosen to be on this journey together.

The group arrives to the kingdom's capital and the King (Fei Xiang) throws a feast for them, begging Sanzang to exorcise the bloodthirsty demoness from their land. Suddenly Lady White appears and demands the monk, but he offers her his help in enlightenment instead. She tells Wukong that they are both very alike, and tries to persuade Wukong to let her devour the monk, but he deceives her instead and a fight ensues. During the chaos, the King's guards kidnap Sanzang. It is revealed that it's actually been the King kidnapping and killing the children in a desperate attempt to cure himself of a cursed disease by drinking their blood. He tries to kill Sanzang, but Wukong arrives and saves the monk and the surviving children as well. All of the group are celebrated as heroes, but as a little girl approaches Sanzang, Wukong beats her and her mother to death as well, because his truth-seeking eyes perceive both were possessed by the White Bone Demon. In a fit of anger and disbelief, Tang banishes Wukong away. As soon as Wukong leaves, Sanzang gets kidnapped by the demoness.

In the demoness' lair, the White Bone Demon gives Sanzang a day to convince her to give up her evil ways and embrace nonviolence and enlightenment as the true path to immortality. She reveals to him the story she had told him earlier was true, recounting her previous life as a mortal. Right before Sanzang's time is up, he is saved by Wukong at the last minute. Wukong, Bajie and Wujing fight the White Bone Demon and her army and finally defeat her, with Wukong mortally wounding her. The Buddha comes down from the Heavens to collect the defeated demoness' soul and banish it to oblivion but Sanzang pleads Buddha to grant her mercy and give Sanzang one last chance to save her soul from destruction. Buddha tells him that he would have to lead her on the path herself, meaning he would have to sacrifice his own life. The monk begs the demoness to show remorse and accept the Wheel of Reincarnation, but the White Bone Demon would rather die as a broken tainted soul in Sanzang's body instead of returning to the Wheel of Reincarnation. Saddened, Tang begs Wukong to kill him, too. The Monkey King refuses at first, but Sanzang explains how he used to think he just had to recite Buddha's teachings to convince people to become good. Now he understands he must also lead by example and do good in order to convince people. Sanzang had to do this for his own journey towards enlightenment. Wukong finally understands the monk's desire to help the demoness change her fate, and tearfully agrees, promising Sanzang to wait for his return. Wukong brings his staff down and Sanzang's body is changed into a statue. In return Sanzang says if he gets a chance to do so in his next life, he would be glad to be Wukong's master again. Because of Sanzang's sacrifice, he succeeds in leading the demoness to her next reincarnation, freeing her of her pain and hatred.

Some time later, Wukong and his friends still wait for the return of the monk, but continue their journey to the Thunder Monastery. Wukong rides on Sanzang's horse with Sanzang's statue strapped to his back. From Heaven, Guanyin drops a bead of water from her magic vase that falls to earth and hits right at Sanzang's hand. The surface cracks, revealing a human finger underneath.

== Cast ==
- Aaron Kwok as Sun Wukong, the Monkey King
- Feng Shaofeng as Tang Sanzang, the Buddhist monk
- Xiaoshenyang as Zhu Bajie, the pig demon
- Him Law as Sha Wujing, the water-spirit
- Gong Li as Baigujing, the White Bone Demon
- Fei Xiang as the king of Yun Hai Xi Kingdom (literally Western Kingdom of Sea of Clouds)
- Kelly Chen as Guan Yin, the Mercy Goddess (special appearance)
- Lu Weu, Xi'er Qi and Miya Muqi as the evil spirits snake, bat and porcupine.

== Production ==
=== Development ===
After The Monkey King was released in January 2014, Filmko Entertainment announced a sequel in February. Chow Yun-fat was expected to reprise his role as the Jade Emperor in this film, but the character ultimately did not appear in this film.

=== Casting ===
Aaron Kwok, who portrayed the Bull Demon King in the prequel, portrays Sun Wukong in this installment, replacing Donnie Yen from the previous installment. To prepare for his role, Kwok took several months of martial arts training before the shoot. During filming, Kwok had to undergo six hours of makeup and an additional three hours to clean it up daily. Gong Li join to the cast in November, portraying the role of Baigujing, the White Skull Demoness. Additional cast members included Feng Shaofeng as Tang Sanzang, a role that was previously reported to be portrayed by Louis Koo, Xiaoshenyang as Zhu Bajie, and Him Law as Sha Wujing. Him Law previously portrayed Muzha in the previous installment. Feng Shaofeng previously portrayed the role of Erlang Shen in Journey to the West (2011).

=== Filming ===
Principal photography began in December 2014 in Wuxi Studio. The 3D supervisor Sean Kelly from The Lord of the Rings and The Hobbit joined the production crew. Special makeup effects were supervised by Shaun Smith. Visual effects were supervised by Oscar-nominated VFX Supervisor Jacques Stroweis. Filmko Entertainment co-produced the film with an additional production companies. In February 2015, main cast members Kwok, Gong, Feng, Xiaoshenyang and Law took blessings at a Buddhist temple in Wuxi as the film was heading into the final stages of filming.

== Release ==
On 24 December, the film held a press conference in Wuxi where it was attended by the film's producer Kiefer Liu, director Cheang Pou-soi, action director Sammo Hung, and main cast members Aaron Kwok, Gong Li, Feng Shaofeng, Xiaoshenyang, and Him Law. The Monkey King 2 was released on 8 February 2016, the first day of the Chinese New Year holiday period, which is also the first day of the Year of the Monkey.

=== Box office ===
The Monkey King 2 was released in Feb 6, 2016 simultaneously with The Mermaid and From Vegas to Macau III in China and recorded an opening day of US$25 million.

=== Critical reception ===
Elizabeth Kerr of The Hollywood Reporter called the film "a fun spin on a well-worn legend". Maggie Lee of Variety called the film "less of a dud than the director's inane original". James Marsh of Screen Daily describes the script and the video effects as an improvement on the previous film. Edward Lee of the South China Morning Post described it as a "vastly improved" sequel.

On Rotten Tomatoes, the film holds an approval rating of 100% based on five reviews, with an average rating of 6.96/10.

On IMDb, the film has a rating of 5.9/10 and 71.9% on Google Users rating.

== Accolades ==
Awards and nominations
Ceremony	Category	Recipient	Result
36th Hong Kong Film Awards	Best Action Choreography	Sammo Hung	Nominated
36th Hong Kong Film Awards	Best Art Direction	Daniel Fu	Nominated
36th Hong Kong Film Awards	Best Costume Makeup Design	Yee Chung-Man, Dora Ng	Won
36th Hong Kong Film Awards	Best Sound Design	Yin Jay	Nominated
36th Hong Kong Film Awards	Best Visual Effects	Luke Sungjin Jung, Sanghoon Kim, Kim Chan-soo, Kim Chlu-min	Won

== Sequel ==
A sequel, The Monkey King 3, was released in China on 16 February 2018. Zhao Liying was cast in the role of the Ruler of Women's Country. The original cast members of The Monkey King 2, Aaron Kwok, Feng Shaofeng, Xiaoshenyang, and Him Law, reprised their roles in the film.
