= Best Get Going =

- Promotional poster

Chinese name
- Traditional Chinese: 加油吧實習生
- Simplified Chinese: 加油吧实习生
Transcriptions
Standard Mandarin
- Hanyu Pinyin: Jiāyóu ba shíxí shēng
- Genre: Workplace
- Written by: Wang Yi
- Directed by: Sun Hao
- Starring: Zhao Liying; Zheng Kai; Cai Wenjing; Zheng Jiabin
- Country of origin: China
- Original language: Standard Chinese
- No. of episodes: 35 episodes（Mainland China） 38 episodes（Abroad）

Production
- Production location: Zhejiang ProvinceNingbo/Shanghai
- Production companies: Beijing Modern Vision Culture Media Co., Ltd., Ningbo Modern Vision Culture Media Co., Ltd., Beijing Ferris Wheel Culture Media Co., Ltd., Ciwen Media Group Co., Ltd.

Original release
- Network: Jiangsu Broadcasting Corporation

Best Get Going
- Simplified Chinese: 加油吧实习生
Transcriptions
Standard Mandarin
- Hanyu Pinyin: Jia You Ba Shi Xi Sheng

Best Get Going (Chinese: 加油吧实习生), also known as "Intern", "Running Intern", adapted from Lan Xiaoxi's "Intern", is a TV series produced by Beijing Modern Vision Culture Media Co., Ltd., Ningbo Modern Vision Culture Media Co., Ltd., Beijing Ferris Wheel, directed by Sun Hao, starring Zhao Liying, Zheng Kai, Cai Wenjing, Zheng Jiabin.

Filming started up in Ningbo on October 22, 2014, ended in Shanghai on January 26, 2015. It was broadcast on Jiangsu Broadcasting Corporation on July 17, 2015, and ended on August 4, 2015.

== Broadcast platform ==
Channel	Location	Broadcast date	Broadcast time
Jiangsu Broadcasting Corporation	Mainland China	July 17, 2015	19:30-21:30 every night (Two episodes in a row)
Shuang Xing	Malaysia	September 24, 2015	Monday to Friday 19:00-20:00
Southeast Television	Mainland China	January 21, 2016	Every night 19:30-21:15 （Two episodes in a row）

== Plot ==
The play is adapted from Lan Xiaoxi's novel "The Intern", which reflects the interns who first entered the workplace after the 90s. It tells the wonderful story of Song Nuan, Zhang Sheng and other college graduates who first entered the workplace and experienced self-growth and sweet love after experiencing several workplace tests.

== Cast ==
Actor	Role	Introduction
Zhao Liying	Song Nuan	An intern in the president's office of JM Company, she is a girl who is innocent, kind, and has a very strong heart. When friends quarrel, she always stands in a neutral position and acts as a peacemaker, but because of her personality, she often causes a lot of trouble. Although she faces a lot of hardships at work but is unwilling to compromise, she can always overcome and persevere with his own willpower. Once because of Zhang Sheng's teasing, she wanted to leave JM. When Zhang Sheng expressed her crush on Song Nuan in front of Zhou Gege, she turned against Zhou Gege, but she kept trying to restore their friendship. Later, she fell in love with Zhang Sheng. In the end, with the perseverance of never giving up when encountering difficulties, she won the highest score among the interns.
Zheng Kai	Zhang Sheng	Formerly an intern at JM Company, later transferred to the President's Office as an intern, the son of the chairman of Fenghua Company, a typical rich second generation. With a carefree personality, he only wanted to start his own business but was blocked by his mother, and then went to JM Company as an intern. In the beginning, Song Nuan was transferred to the president's office because she misunderstood Song Nuan's small report to her mother and often made things difficult for her. Song Nuan left JM because of an excessive teasing. Later, under Wang Siyuan's persuasion and request, he tried every means to ask Song Nuan's forgiveness and asked Song Nuan to return to JM. After solving the misunderstanding, he always helped Song Nuan because he fell in love with her. Later, due to the death of his mother, he changed his previous personality and became a steady, thoughtful and responsible man. After the intern expired, he and Zhao Xiaochuan returned to Chongming Island to start their own business, which not only fulfilled their mother's expectations, but also realized their original dream.
Cai Wenjing	Zhou Gege	Song Nuan's university roommate, colleague and best friend, an intern in the sales department of JM Company, is a strong girl who dares to love and hate. Originally liked Zhang Sheng, but after learning that Zhang Sheng liked Song Nuan, she did not hesitate to have a four-year friendship with Song Nuan for a while. Because of Gao Ruohan's cynicism and Nimbala's constant entanglement with her mother, she was admitted to the hospital and was dissatisfied with her two roommates. After Song Nuanlaqi went to Ningbala's house and saw Ningbala's plight, she realized that she had misunderstood Ningbala and reconciled. Later, after Zhao Xiaochuan changed his attitude, she figured it out. In fact, what she wanted was a person who could be down-to-earth and always accompany him, so she fell in love with Zhao Xiaochuan.
Zheng Jiabin	Zhao Xiaochuan	A good friend of Zhang Sheng, an intern in the sales department of JM Company. He has a lot of research on computers, and often writes programs to make money. Like Zhou Gege, at first she was worshiped as a goddess, willing to do anything for her, and later learned that she liked Zhang Sheng because of money, and changed her past stalker personality for her.
Fu Jing	Ning Bala	Song Nuan's classmate and college roommate, a former intern of Fenghua Company, dressed very neutrally. Living in a poor single-parent family, her mother suffers from intermittent mental illness and is often abused. Therefore, it is very hard for the family to rely on her income alone to make ends meet. Afterwards, she resigned as an intern, took her mother back to her hometown to recuperate, and set up her own organic farm to start her own business.
Wang Zhixuan	Gao Wenruohan	Song Nuan's classmate, colleague, college roommate and an intern at JM Company. Because she pays attention to appearance, she does micro-surgery, and has a big personality. After entering JM with a side door, she fell in love with the rich and powerful Zhang Sheng and pursued him enthusiastically, so she and Zhou Gege became rivals and rivals in love. Later, she resigned as an intern. She originally wanted to rely on her wealthy businessman husband to be a wealthy wife for the rest of her life. Unexpectedly, her husband's company went bankrupt and she became pregnant and lived an ordinary life as a housewife.
Li Youlin	Song Guangming	Song Nuan's father loved Song Nuan very much and won her an internship at JM. Because of Song Nuan, he resigned as a teacher with his wife and moved to Shanghai. Later, he was introduced by a friend to serve as the vice president of Huitong Shanghai Branch. Later, he went to a bar to work as a dishwasher, but the drummer in the band who sang in the bar could not continue to perform due to physical factors, and then replaced the drummer.
Zhu Yin	Chen Ailian	Zhou Gege's mother, an old employee of Fenghua, was later laid off. She is greedy for petty gains, plays mahjong all day long, and does everything for Gege's career and future, which has caused misunderstandings between Zhou Gege and Ningbala. In order to delay Ningbala's notification of his dismissal, rumors spread that Zhou Gege and Zhang Sheng were about to marry, and after letting Chairman Fenghua know, President Wang ordered Ningbala to deal with her dismissal first. She was still worried about Ningbala's actions, and she was relieved after knowing Ningbala's plight. After being laid off, she went to JM as a cleaner. After knowing that Gege fell in love with Zhao Xiaochuan, she tried his best to obstruct them, but finally fulfilled them.
Wang Ji	Jin Yanru	Zhang Sheng's mother, the chairman of Fenghua Company, was strict with Zhang Sheng but also thought of him in every way. After her career failed and Fenghua went bankrupt, she figured out that if she had to choose again, she would rather be an ordinary mother. But then, after spending a day with Zhang Sheng as an ordinary mother and child, she chose to commit suicide by jumping off the building.
Yu Xiaowei	Wang Siyuan	The CEO of JM Company, is a reasonable boss who understands the world and affects people, big and small, in the company.
Wen Ruohan	Wang Gang	Jin Yanru's confidant, later betrayed Jin Yanru
Geng Le	Chen Jian	The vice president of JM Company is dissatisfied with Wang Siyuan, and he and Hao Min are husband and wife
Zheng Zeshi	Guo Huaying	Chairman of JM Company
Che Xiao	Hao Min	Director of the President Office of JM Company, and Chen Jian are husband and wife

== TV soundtrack ==
No.	Title	Singer	Length
1.	"I don't want to say goodbye" (Theme tune)	Zheng Kai
2.	"The rhythm of the city" (The ending song)	Liu Qin
3.	"Meet again"	Liu Qin
4.	"Because of love"
5.	"Hello tomorrow"	Milk Coffee
6.	"Flying my dream"	Liu Rui
