= A Simple Noodle Story =

2009 Chinese-Hong Kong film by Zhang Yimou

- Chinese release poster
- Directed by: Zhang Yimou
- Screenplay by: Shi Jianquan; Xu Zhengchao
- Story by: Joel Coen; Ethan Coen
- Based on: Blood Simple by the Coen brothers
- Produced by: William Kong
- Starring: Sun Honglei; Ni Dahong; Xiaoshenyang; Yan Ni
- Cinematography: Zhao Xiaoding
- Edited by: Meng Peicong
- Music by: Zhao Lin
- Production company: Beijing New Picture Co.
- Distributed by: EDKO Film
- Release date: 11 December 2009
- Running time: 90 minutes
- Countries: China; Hong Kong
- Languages: Mandarin; English
- Budget: $12 million
- Box office: $38.6 million

A Simple Noodle Story (simplified Chinese: 三枪拍案惊奇; traditional Chinese: 三槍拍案驚奇; pinyin: Sānqiāng Pāi'àn Jīngqí), internationally known as A Woman, a Gun and a Noodle Shop, is a 2009 film directed by Zhang Yimou. Described as a cross between screwball comedy and thriller, the film stars Sun Honglei and Ni Dahong in the thriller segment while comedians Xiaoshenyang and Yan Ni star in the comedic segment.

A Chinese-Hong Kong remake of the 1984 American film Blood Simple, the debut of the Coen brothers, the plot transports the original film's town in Texas to a noodle shop in a small desert town in Gansu province. The film has been described as a considerable departure from the director's previous works.

== Premise ==
The abusive owner of a noodle shop in the desert in China plans the murder of his adulterous wife and her lover but it goes awry after various characters' intertwined stories lead to double crosses and fatalities.

== Cast ==
- Sun Honglei – Zhang
- Ni Dahong – Wang
- Xiaoshenyang – Li
- Yan Ni – Wang's Wife

== Production ==
Principal photography began in June 2009, and the film was released on December 11, 2009 in China.

== Reception ==
=== Critical response ===
The film made its international premiere in competition at the 60th Berlin International Film Festival, where it was nominated for the Golden Bear.

The film received polarizing responses from audiences, with some noting the film's visual inventiveness and non-serious tone, while others criticized the filmmaker's use of slapstick humor and over-the-top style. Zhang revealed at the Berlinale that the Coen brothers had written to him after seeing a copy of the film, and expressed that they loved the changes made in this version.

A Simple Noodle Story has an approval rating of 34% on review aggregator website Rotten Tomatoes, based on 59 reviews, and an average rating of 5.5/10. The website's critical consensus states: "Zhang Yimou's broad reinterpretation of the Coen Brothers' Blood Simple struggles to bring anything new to the twisty murder mystery and instead ladles on an excess of stilted comedy". Metacritic assigned the film a weighted average score of 57 out of 100, based on 28 critics, indicating "mixed or average reviews".

Derek Elley of Variety described the film as a "much more ascetic, chamber-like dramedy" that is a "pretty close adaptation" and "spiced up with some pratfall humor and visually enhanced by saturated lensing." Elley also noted, "Coen aficionados won't be surprised by any of the subsequent twists in the tale, and general auds will be pleasantly amused, as Zhang tries to manipulate events for his own purposes."

Maggie Lee of The Hollywood Reporter is more mixed on the film, and described it as "a high-rolling but garish production with untranslatable regional ribald humor", and noted the changes from the original with "pacing is much more frenetic with characters and cameras in restless motion. The intervals are crammed with exotic sight gags and colloquial wordplay, such as a dough-making scene choreographed like a plate-spinning acrobatic show or the group hip-hop dance routine."

Some critics also viewed the film as unique in Zhang's filmography. James Marsh of Twitch Film described the film as "a spectacular departure from his previous work", and praised the film's first half as "breakneck paced" with "many laughs to be had throughout", but noted, "The second half takes a deliberate shift into darker territory, as those already familiar with the story will know, and while handled effectively in its own right, it does lose some of the energy generated in the first half." However, Marsh stated: "That said, the film must certainly be deemed a success, both as an experimentation for the director, as an adaptation of Blood Simple and as a screwball comedy in its own right."

Edmund Lee of Time Out Hong Kong described the film as "surely one of the year's unlikeliest projects", and a "sacrilegiously funny period remake." Lee further stated: "Zhang has traded Texas' oppressively bleak vista for China's visually intoxicating desert landscape for this enthralling film, at once hilarious and cruelly ironic."

However, Perry Lam in Muse criticized it, stating: "The story unfolds in an almost surreal, suspiciously computer-generated setting that is decisively closed off to outer reality. Zhang, who usually cares deeply about his characters, loses his intense emotional command over his actors."

Geoffrey Macnab of The Independent, reviewing the film at the Berlinale, stated: "Zhang Yimou's remake of the Coen brothers' Blood Simple is exhilarating and inventive" and "Zhang's formal mastery is little short of astonishing...there are few film-makers who use colour or sound editing in such a bravura way."

=== Box office ===
The film cost approximately $12 million to make, notably less expensive than Zhang Yimou's most recent historical epics. The film, in spite of the polarized reception, was successful at the box office, and went on to gross 261 million yuan ($38 million) in less than six weeks, tripling the film's budget.
