= Van Fan =

Taiwanese actor and singer

- 范佑臣
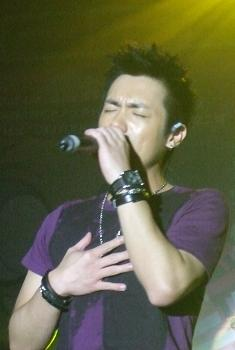
- Fan on a Taiwan performance tour in 2009
- Born: Fan Yu-chen (范佑臣); 3 November 1978 (age 48); Donghe, Taitung County, Taiwan
- Occupations: Actor, singer, singer-songwriter
- Years active: 2002-present
- Musical career
- Also known as: Fan Yi-chen
- Instrument: Guitar
- Label: Forward Music ｜ 天堂鳥
- Website: Van Fan and CrazeBand Official Blog

Fan Yu-chen (Chinese: 范佑臣; pinyin: Fàn Yòuchén; Amis: Lingas (林納斯); born 3 November 1978), better known as Van Fan or Fan Yi-chen (Chinese: 范逸臣; pinyin: Fàn Yìchén), is a Taiwanese singer and actor with ancestry from the Amis aborigine tribe. He is best known for Cape No. 7, the second top-selling film in Taiwanese cinematic history.

== Career ==
Fan made his debut in 2002 with the Chinese version theme song I Believe to the South Korean film My Sassy Girl. After a somewhat mediocre singing career, Fan started to show up in local TV series since 2005, and rose to fame in the Greater China Area in 2008 after the significant success of Cape No. 7, whose two theme songs As Happy as Can Be (Chinese: 無樂不作; pinyin: Wú Lè Bú Zuò) and South of Border (Chinese: 國境之南; pinyin: Guó Jìng Zhī Nán) are also sung by him.

In 2014, Fan played a role in the new film The Break-Up Artist. The film was shot in Beijing and Taiwan and was released on June 6, 2014.

== Filmography ==
- Mortal Ouija (2019)
- 52Hz, I Love You (2017)
- Days of Our Own (2016)
- Chinese Wine (2016)
- E-commerce Times (2015)
- Fighting Youth (2015)
- Live With a Thief (2014)
- The Break-Up Artist (2014)
- Runaway Woman (2012)
- Paradise Kiss (2012)
- The Love Flu (2012)
- Let It Be (2012)
- Any Otherside (2012)
- Gangster Rock (2010)
- L-O-V-E (2009)
- Cape No.7 (2008)
- Big (2023)

== Discography ==
=== As a solo artist ===
- 2002 : 1st Album 范逸臣
- 2003 : 2nd Album 信仰愛情
- 2004 : 3rd Album 愛情程式
- 2006 : 4th Album 不說出的溫柔
- 2008 : 無樂不作 ~ 精選輯
- 2013 : 5th Album 搖滾吧，情歌

=== With Craze Band ===
- 2010 : 初生之犢 1st Album
