= Him Law =

Hong Kong actor

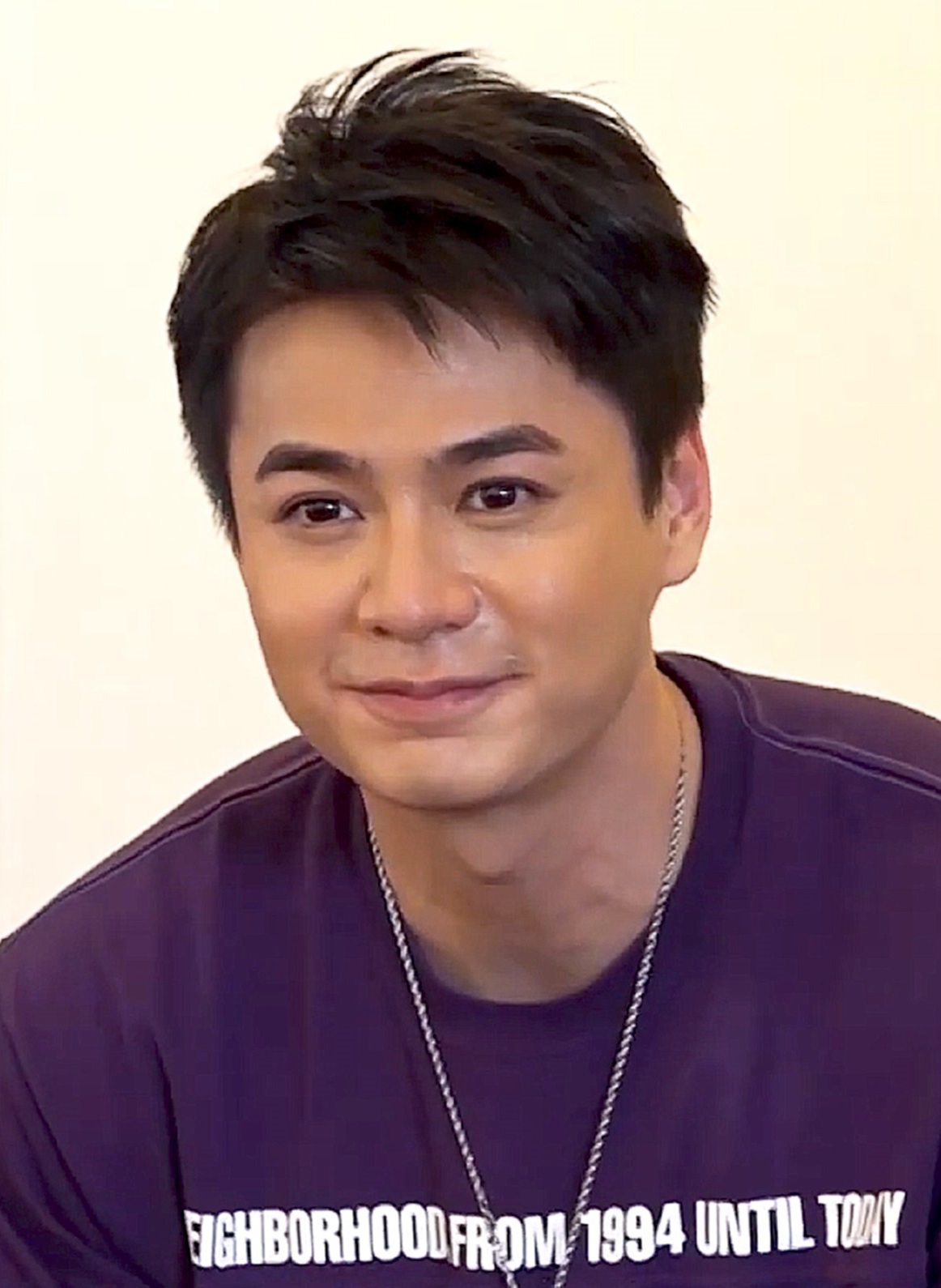
- Law in 2019
- Born: Law Chung-him (羅仲謙); 28 August 1984 (age 41); British Hong Kong
- Occupation: Actor
- Years active: 2005–present
- Notable work: The Hippocratic Crush series
- Spouse: Tavia Yeung (m. 2016)
- Children: 2
- Awards: My AOD Favourites Awards; My Favourite Supporting Actor; 2012 The Hippocratic Crush; My Top 15 Favourite TV Characters; 2012 The Hippocratic Crush

Chinese name
- Traditional Chinese: 羅子溢
- Simplified Chinese: 罗子溢
Transcriptions
Standard Mandarin
- Hanyu Pinyin: Luó Zǐ Yì
Yue: Cantonese
- Jyutping: Lo^{4} Zi^{2} Jat^{6}

Him Law Tze-yat (born Law Chung-him on 28 August 1984) is a Hong Kong actor currently contracted to TVB.

Law began his acting career by starring as supporting characters in several well-known films, most notably in Mob Sister (2005), which was also Law's debut film. He later began filming for several internet and television dramas, later receiving a Best Supporting Actor nomination at the TVB Anniversary Awards in 2008 for his performance in the sports drama Your Class or Mine.

== Early life ==
Law was born to a simple Hakka family in the New Territories. As his parents were divorced when he was young, he was brought up by his uncle who did not have any children. He has an older sister who is two years older than him. His father is a hair stylist, his mother is a make-up artist, and his older sister is a piano teacher.

Law attended Tai Po Government Secondary School where he was a member of the basketball and association football teams. He was devoted to sports—he would go to basketball practice every day after school and football practice every weekday night. On weekends, he would hang out in football courts during the day and basketball courts at night. When Law was 16, he worked as a part-time lifeguard.

Following his Form 5 graduation in 2001, he briefly worked as a lifeguard at a private swimming venue in Villa Esplanada, Tsing Yi Island, using the money he earned to study stress and rescue diving at the Happy Valley Athletic Association. In 2004, Law earned the annual Lifeguard Award. Seeing that being a lifeguard earns little income and is unsuitable to be a lifelong career, Law planned to attend a fire academy to become a firefighter. However, he decided against it and prepared himself for attending a police academy instead.

== Career ==
Law was discovered by a film producer from Hong Kong's Filmko Films Distribution while accompanying a female friend to a casting audition. At that time, Law was already thinking of changing jobs and was preparing to attend a police academy. Curious for a career in acting, Law signed a management and acting contract with Filmko with the support from both his family and friends. Law debuted in the 2005 Hong Kong action film Mob Sister as the boyfriend of Annie Liu's character. He soon began starring in various other Hong Kong films as supporting roles, many in which he starred as the love interest of Elanne Kong's characters.

After starring in several internet dramas produced by RTHK, Law began filming for television dramas produced by TVB to "brush up his acting." Although Dressage To Win was Law's first drama to broadcast on television, he first filmed the 2008 sports comedy-drama Your Class or Mine, starring opposite Bobby Au-yeung and Sheren Tang. Law portrayed Fan Pui-tung, a high school football player, and received a Best Supporting Actor nomination at the 2008 TVB Anniversary Awards.

According to Law, filming for television dramas was difficult as he only gets two to four hours of sleep daily, but he exclaimed that it was a good way to improve his acting. Law received critical praise and broader recognition through his performance in the 2009 comedy crime drama D.I.E. Again.

He portrayed Jim Shu-bong ("James Bond"), a young and tech-smart investigator working for the D.I.E. investigation unit of the police department.

Law was later cast to portray Joe Ma's younger brother in the romantic comedy drama Suspects in Love, produced by Poon Ka Tak. Law's character, Ken, is a college-graduate thai boxing trainer. To prepare for his role, Law devoted half a year in the gym, training for two hours straight. To achieve a sunny tanned look, Law consistently stayed in the sun for over two hours.

== Personal life ==
Law was in an on–off relationship with singer and actress Theresa Fu from January 2010 to July 2011. In August 2011, Fu publicly accused Law of physical abuse. Photos of her bruises were also made public. Law apologized in a press conference for his actions and admitted that there was a fundamental lack of trust in the relationship.

Law began a relationship with actress Tavia Yeung after collaborating in the television drama The Hippocratic Crush in 2011. After five years of dating, they held a private wedding ceremony at Leeds Castle in Kent, England, in March 2016. They held another wedding ceremony in Hong Kong in October 2016 and registered for marriage. Together, Law and Yeung have a daughter and a son, born respectively in 2020 and 2021.

== Filmography ==
=== Film ===
Year	Title	Role	Notes
2005	Mob Sister	Little Red Cap	
2006	Black Night		Segment: Next Door
2007	Eye in the Sky	Policeman	
2007	Kidnap	Fat Jai	
2008	See You In YouTube	Chung-him	
2008	Happy Funeral	Him	
2008	Ocean Flame		
2010	Marriage with a Liar	Jerry	
2011	Beach Spike	Tim	
2011	Love is the Only Answer	Sai-kit	
2011	Hong Kong Ghost Stories	Ka-ming	
2013	Young and Dangerous: Reloaded	Chan Ho-nam	
2014	The Monkey King	Muzha	
2014	The Seventh Lie		
2016	The Monkey King 2	Sha Wujing	
2016	Summer's Desire	Ou Chen	
2018	The Monkey King 3	Sha Wujing	
2019	Little Q	Simon	
2020	Double World	Wen Tianyu	

=== Television series ===
Year	Title	Role	Notes/Ref.
2008	Dressage to Win	Him	
2008	Your Class or Mine	Fan Pui-tung	Nominated — TVB Anniversary Award for Best Supporting Actor (Top 5)
2009	D.I.E. Again	Constable Jim Shu-bong (James Bond)	
2010	Suspects in Love	Ken Ng Chung-hong	Nominated — TVB Anniversary Award for My Favourite TV Male Character (Top 15); Nominated — TVB Anniversary Award for Most Improved Male Artiste
2010	Criminal Investigation	Kit	Golden Calf Awards for Improved 180 Award
2010	F.S.D.	Fong Kin	Episode: "Danger All Around"
2011	Wax and Wane	Roy Lai Pak-hei	
2011	Til Love Do Us Lie	Ho Tak-yeung	Cameo (Episode 136)
2012	L'Escargot	Kwan Ka-wing	Nominated — TVB Anniversary Award for Most Improved Male Artiste
2012	The Hippocratic Crush	Dr. Yeung Pui-chung (Onion)	My AOD Favourites Award for My Favourite Actor in a Supporting Role; My AOD Favourites Award for My Top 15 Favourite TV Characters; Nominated — TVB Anniversary Award for Best Supporting Actor (Top 10); Nominated — TVB Anniversary Award for Most Improved Male Artiste
2012	Elite Brigade	Cheng Kar-ho	Episode: "Ready to Go Ahead"
2012	Tiger Cubs	Asst. Sergeant Yu Hok-lai	Nominated — TVB Anniversary Award for Most Improved Male Artiste
2012	Divas in Distress	Vincent Chak Yau-sing	Nominated — TVB Anniversary Award for Most Improved Male Artiste; Nominated — My AOD Favourites Award for My Favourite Onscreen Couple (with Mandy Wong)
2012	Highs and Lows	Asst. Sergeant Yu Hok-lai	Cameo (episode 30)
2013	Season of Love	Season	Episodes 1–5: Chapter of Spring
2013	Triumph in the Skies II	Jim Tsz-lun (Jim Jim)	Nominated - TVB Anniversary Award for Most Improved Male Artiste (Top 5)
2013	The Hippocratic Crush II	Dr. Yeung Pui-chung (Onion)	Nominated - TVB Anniversary Award for Most Improved Male Artiste (Top 5)
2014-2015	Tiger Cubs II	Asst. Sergeant Yu Hok-lai	Nominated — TVB Anniversary Award for Best Actor
2014	Lady Sour	Tsin Tung	
2015	Young Charioteers	Jedi Yau Tat	
2016	Fashion War	Francis Fan Kwok-pong	
2018	Infernal Affairs	Wai Jeun Hin	
2020	The Witness	Kole Ko Lik-kei / Ko Chin-cheung	Nominated — TVB Anniversary Award for Best Actor; Nominated — TVB Anniversary Award for Most Popular Male Character; Nominated — TVB Anniversary Award for Favourite TVB Actor in Malaysia (Top 5)
2021	Armed Reaction 2021	Lau Tat-wah (Wah Dee)	Nominated — TVB Anniversary Award for Most Popular Onscreen Partnership (with Tony Hung, Gloria Tang and Leo Kwan)
2021	Kids' Lives Matter	Dr. Max Man Pak-hei	Nominated — TVB Anniversary Award for Best Supporting Actor (Top 5); Nominated — People's Choice Television Award for Best Supporting Actor (Top 10)
2022	Modern Dynasty	Thomas Ma Yiu-tong	
2024	Happily Ever After?	Tim Poon Sin-yan	
2024	The Heir to the Throne	Brian Yau Chi-pan	
2025	The Fading Gold	Ko Sham	

=== Others ===
Year	Title	Role	Notes
2006	Crossing	Him	Internet serial drama
2007	Sex Education Online	Edison	Internet serial drama Episode: "Tales of a Hong Kong Girl"
2007	"You're Not Here Anymore" (你不在了) by Elanne Kwong	Love interest	Music video
2007	"Road of Sorrow" (傷情路) by Elanne Kwong	Love interest	Music video
2009	Lun Chun Yat Ka Yan ("Family")	Fung	Internet serial drama
2010	"Black Room" (黑房) by Theresa Fu		Music video

== Awards and nominations ==
Year	Award	Category	Nominated work	Result
2008	TVB Anniversary Awards	Best Supporting Actor	Your Class or Mine	Nominated (Top 5)
2010	Golden Calf Awards	Improved 180 Award	Criminal Investigation	Won
2010	TVB Anniversary Awards	My Favourite Male Character	Suspects in Love	Nominated (Top 15)
2010	TVB Anniversary Awards	Most Improved Male Artiste	Suspects in Love; Miss Hong Kong in India	Nominated
