= Zhu Xian (novel) =

Novel by Xiao Ding

- Original title: 诛仙
- Language: Chinese
- Publication date: 2005
- Publication place: China

Zhu Xian (simplified Chinese: 诛仙; traditional Chinese: 誅仙, lit."Immortal-slaying"), translated as Jade Dynasty or The Attack of Heaven, is a Chinese xianxia fantasy novel written by Xiao Ding from 2003 to 2007. The length is about 1.6 million Chinese characters.

== Plot ==
Zhang Xiaofan, a boy who survives the massacre of his village and is taken in by the Qingyun Mountain, the leading orthodox cultivation force. Although he appears untalented, he secretly comes to possess both Buddhist and Daoist cultivation methods, as well as a mysterious and dangerous magical weapon. During the conflict between the righteous sects and the cult factions, Zhang Xiaofan meets Bi Yao, the daughter of the Ghost King, and their relationship places him between loyalty to his sect and love for those regarded as enemies.

After Bi Yao sacrifices herself to save him, Zhang Xiaofan breaks with Qingyun and joins the Ghost King Sect under the name Gui Li. The later part of the novel follows his search for a way to revive Bi Yao, the growing conflict between the major sects, and the struggle over the powerful Immortal-Slaying Blade Formation. The story combines xianxia adventure with themes of love, loyalty, moral ambiguity, sacrifice and redemption.

== Characters and setting ==
=== Main Characters ===
- Zhang Xiaofan / Gui Li (张小凡 / 鬼厉): Male protagonist. He begins as an ordinary boy from Grass Temple Village, but after a tragedy destroys his home, he is taken into the Qingyun Mountain. Compared with other disciples, he seems slow and untalented at first, yet his fate becomes tied to powerful Buddhist, Taoist, and demonic forces. Later, after suffering betrayal, trauma, and emotional loss, he takes the name Gui Li, becoming a much darker and more conflicted figure.
- Lu Xueqi (陆雪琪): A gifted disciple of Qingyun Mountain’s Little Bamboo Peak and is known for her cold, elegant personality and exceptional swordsmanship. She often appears distant, but beneath her calm exterior she has deep feelings and a strong sense of duty. Her relationship with Zhang Xiaofan is central to the emotional structure of the novel.
- Bi Yao (碧瑶): The daughter of the Ghost King (鬼王), the leader of a major cult faction. Unlike the stereotype of a dark princess, she is lively, brave, emotional, and sincere. Her love for Zhang Xiaofan becomes the most tragic part of the story.

=== Qingyun Mountain (青云山 / 青云门) ===
The largest force on the orthodox side, it is a Taoist sect with a history of 2,000 years. Qingyun Mountain is divided into seven branches, each with its own Master and disciples.

==== Tongtian Peak (通天峰) ====
The main peak of Qingyun Mountain and the seat of the sect leader.

- Daoxuan Zhenren (道玄真人): The leader of Qingyun Mountain, with profound cultivation and extremely high prestige. He oversees the entire Qingyun Mountain and makes decisions on major affairs.
- Xiao Yicai (萧逸才): A disciple of Daoxuan Zhenren. Careful and meticulous, he assists the sect leader in handling the affairs of Qingyun Mountain.

==== Peak of Loong's Head (龙首峰) ====
The branch most renowned for its swordsmanship.

- Cangsong Daoren (苍松道人): The Master of Peak of Loong's Head, responsible for enforcing the rules of Qingyun Mountain.
- Qi Hao (齐昊): Cangsong Daoren’s eldest disciple, highly talented.
- Lin Jingyu (林惊羽): Like Zhang Xiaofan, he is an orphan from Grass Temple Village. He is highly gifted, and his magical weapon is the Loong-Slaying Sword.

==== Big Bamboo Peak (大竹峰) ====
The branch to which Zhang Xiaofan belongs, known for its plain and unadorned style of cultivation.

- Tian Buyi (田不易): The Master of Big Bamboo Peak. Short and stout in appearance, he possesses profound Daoist power. Though stern on the outside, he is fiercely protective of his own disciples.
- Su Ru (苏茹): Tian Buyi’s wife. Graceful and beautiful, gentle on the outside but strong within, she is deeply respected by the disciples.
- Song Daren (宋大仁): The eldest disciple, and the person who rescued Zhang Xiaofan. He uses the great sword Shihu. In Zhu Xian II, he becomes the Master of Big Bamboo Peak.
- Wu Dayi (吴大义): The second disciple.
- Zheng Dali (郑大礼): The third disciple.
- He Dazhi (何大智): The fourth disciple, known as the cleverest person on Big Bamboo Peak.
- Lü Daxin (吕大信): The fifth disciple.
- Du Bishu (杜必书): The sixth disciple. Originally named Du Dashu (杜大书), his name was changed because of his gambling habit (赌必输, "Sure to lose when gambling"). Before Zhang Xiaofan arrived, he was in charge of kitchen duties.
- Tian Linger (田灵儿): The daughter of Tian Buyi and Su Ru. Intelligent and highly talented, she is Zhang Xiaofan’s secret crush and later marries Qi Hao.
- Zhang Xiaofan (张小凡): The protagonist, a boy of ordinary talent with a stubborn and determined personality.
- Dahuang (大黄): A dog raised by Tian Buyi since it was young.
- Xiaohui (小灰): A three-eyed monkey adopted by Zhang Xiaofan.

==== Little Bamboo Peak (小竹峰) ====
A branch that accepts only female disciples.

- Master Shuiyue (水月大师): The Master of Little Bamboo Peak, strict and highly concerned with rules.
- Lu Xueqi (陆雪琪): One of the female protagonists. Exceptionally talented, coldly beautiful, and peerless in bearing, she uses the Tianya Divine Sword. She is one of the most outstanding disciples of Little Bamboo Peak and shares deep feelings with Zhang Xiaofan.
- Wen Min (文敏): A disciple of Little Bamboo Peak and Lu Xueqi’s senior sister. Gentle and kind, she often cares for others.

==== Wind-Return Peak (风回峰) ====
A branch skilled in formations and alchemy.

- Zeng Shuchang (曾叔常): The Master of Wind-Return Peak.
- Zeng Shushu (曾书书): Zeng Shuchang’s only son and a disciple of Wind-Return Peak. Humorous, witty, and widely knowledgeable, he is a good friend of Zhang Xiaofan.

==== Chaoyang Peak (朝阳峰) ====
A branch that emphasizes speed and efficiency in cultivation.

- Shang Zhengliang (商正梁): The seventh-generation Master of Chaoyang Peak.
- Chu Yuhong (楚誉宏): A disciple of Chaoyang Peak.

==== Luoxia Peak (落霞峰) ====
A branch focused mainly on esoteric arts, formations, and talismans.

- Tianyun Daoren (天云道人): The Master of Luoxia Peak.

==== Ancestral Shrine (祖师祠堂) ====
One of the most sacred places in Qingyun Mountain. The shrine enshrines the memorial tablets and relics of Qingyun Mountain’s past founders and Masters, and serves as a place where Qingyun disciples remember their predecessors.

- Wan Jianyi (万剑一): A sweeping old Daoist with profound cultivation, carrying a heavy and little-known fate. A hundred years earlier, he had once stood on equal footing with Daoxuan Zhenren.

==== Illusory Moon Cave (幻月洞府) ====
A forbidden area of Qingyun Mountain and the place where the Immortal-Slaying Blade is kept.

==== Mountain Gate (山门) ====
- Water Qilin / Lingzun (水麒麟 / 灵尊): The guardian divine beast of Mount Qingyun, capable of sensing the aura of the Cult members.

=== Tianyin Temple (天音寺) ===
Another major orthodox sect, founded more than 1,000 years ago. Its members are all monks who cultivate Buddhist teachings, taking compassion as their principle and helping the world.

- Puhong (普泓): The abbot of Tianyin Temple and the foremost of the Four Great Divine Monks. Kind-looking and dignified, he treats Zhang Xiaofan with special care because of Puzhi’s mistake, and once saved him in the back mountain of Qingyun.
- Pude (普德): One of the Four Great Divine Monks. He practices “bitter meditation,” has a dark complexion and a deep, hoarse voice. His cultivation is above that of Puhong.
- Puzhi (普智): One of the Four Great Divine Monks and a key figure at the beginning of the story. Kindly in appearance, he teaches Zhang Xiaofan the Buddhist mental cultivation method known as the Great Brahma Wisdom before his death. Because of the backlash from the Blood-Sucking Bead, he commits a disastrous crime.
- Pukong (普空): One of the Four Great Divine Monks and the lowest-ranking among them. In his youth, he subdued demons and monsters, using the Buddhist Golden Bowl as his magical weapon. In old age, he comes to understand the meaning of Buddhism and lives in seclusion within the temple.
- Pufang (普方): A monk of the Pu generation. Tall in stature, he deeply hates the Cult. He once used the Buddhist Golden Bowl to collapse the Six Fox Cave, burying Bi Yao, her mother, and her grandmother. He had a close relationship with Puzhi, and after Puzhi’s death he devoted himself to studying Buddhist scriptures.
- Faxiang (法相): A young disciple with fair skin, bright eyes, and a moon-white kasaya. Highly accomplished in cultivation, he acts together with Zhang Xiaofan and secretly cares for him because of Puzhi.
- Fashan (法善): Faxiang’s junior fellow disciple. Tall and imposing, with thick eyebrows and large eyes, he appears solemn and authoritative even without anger.

=== Fenxiang Valley (焚香谷) ===
Fenxiang Valley is an important orthodox sect located in the southern borderlands, with a history of 1,500 years. Its cultivation system is distinctive; its disciples are skilled in the use of incense and spiritual fire. Powerful and prestigious among the orthodox sects, Fenxiang Valley joins Qingyun Mountain and Tianyin Temple in resisting the Cult.

- Yun Yilan (云易岚): The valley Master of Fenxiang Valley. He possesses profound cultivation and has a calm, steady personality, earning the respect of his disciples.
- Shangguan Ce (上官策): An elder of Fenxiang Valley and Yun Yilan’s junior fellow disciple. A hundred years earlier, in a secret battle against the southern barbarian tribes, Shangguan Ce displayed great power and overawed the tribes, becoming famous among the sixty-three strange races of the southern borderlands. Within Fenxiang Valley, he guards the Mysterious Fire Altar and normally does not travel in the world. Because he twice fails in his duties, leading to the loss of the Mysterious Fire Mirror and the destruction of the Mysterious Fire Altar, he is eventually forced to reappear.
- Li Xun (李洵): A genius disciple of Fenxiang Valley. Highly accomplished in cultivation and upright in character, he represents the younger generation of Fenxiang Valley.
- Yan Hong (燕虹): A female disciple of Fenxiang Valley. Intelligent, quick-witted, and highly skilled, she has a close relationship with Li Xun.

=== Cult (魔教) ===
==== Ghost King Sect (鬼王宗) ====
The Ghost King Sect is a branch of the Cult, led by the Ghost King, Wan Renwang. It has numerous followers and great influence. The Ghost King Sect pursues power and domination, and often comes into conflict with the orthodox sects.

- Wan Renwang (万人往): The current Ghost King. He possesses profound cultivation, is meticulous in thought, and is skilled in strategy.
- Mr. Ghost (鬼先生): Also known as the Ghost Doctor, he is a mysterious guest official of the Ghost King Sect.
- Bi Yao (碧瑶): The daughter of the Ghost King and deeply loved by her father. Strong-willed and resilient, she uses the magical weapons Sad Flower and Acacia Bell.
- Qinglong (青龙): A protector of the Ghost King Sect, skilled in martial arts and assassination, and meticulous in thought.
- Youji (幽姬): A protector of the Ghost King Sect, skilled in poison and gu arts, with ruthless methods.

==== Sect of Poisons (万毒门) ====
Sect of Poisons is a branch of the Cult known for poison and Gu techniques. Its members are skilled in using various poisons and poisonous insects, and their ruthless methods inspire fear.

- Old Poisoner (毒神 / 老毒物): The leader of the Sect. He has profound power, acts viciously, and is deeply scheming. He uses the magical weapon Bag of Thousand Poisons, keeps the strange insect Seven-Tailed Centipede, and practices the special technique Rotten Poison Moss. On the eve of the Beast God catastrophe, he dies of old age.
- Qin Wuyan (秦无炎): A disciple of Poison God. Deeply scheming and skilled in the use of poison.

==== Hehuan Sect (合欢派) ====
A sect skilled in seduction techniques and dual cultivation. Most of its disciples are women, known for their beauty and allure.

- Fairy Sanmiao (三妙仙子): The leader of Hehuan Sect.
- Jin Ping’er (金瓶儿): A disciple of Hehuan Sect. Seductively beautiful and viciously calculating, she is skilled in seduction techniques.

==== Blood Refining Hall (炼血堂) ====
A former powerful but now less significant branch of the Cult, founded 800 years ago by the Black-Hearted Old Man. Zhang Xiaofan’s Blood-Sucking Bead was originally its magical weapon.

- The Underdog (野狗道人): A member of the Cult’s Blood Refining Hall. Strange in appearance and dog-like, he bullies the weak and fears the strong. He fights Zhang Xiaofan in the Ten-Thousand Bat Ancient Cave. Later, he wanders the world with Zhou Yixian and Little Ring.
- Boss Nian (年老大): A leader of the Cult’s Blood Refining Hall. He uses the strange magical weapon Red Demon Eye.

=== Others ===
- Zhou Yixian (周一仙): A fortune-teller. Thin and elegant in appearance, he seems to have the bearing of an immortal, but has little real skill in physiognomy. He relies on his adopted granddaughter Little Ring to make money by telling fortunes as they travel.
- Little Ring (小环): A fortune-teller. Cute, beautiful, innocent, and kind, she loves candied hawthorn and has astonishing talent in physiognomy. Later, Mr. Ghost teaches her ghost-path techniques. She has a sister-like bond with Jin Ping’er of the Cult and admires Zhang Xiaofan.
- Xiaobai (小白): A nine-tailed fox in who has lived for at least 1,000 years, known for her beauty, ancient wisdom, powerful cultivation.
- Linglong (玲珑): The last shamaness. Incomparably beautiful and possessing heaven-reaching magical power, her magical weapon is the Mysterious Fire Mirror. In her pursuit of immortality, she creates the Beast God from hostile energy and develops a forbidden love with him. Yet she cannot truly be with him. When the Beast God breaks out of the Hundred-Thousand Mountains and brings disaster to all living beings, she sacrifices her life to seal him inside the Demon-Suppressing Ancient Cave.
- God of Beasts (兽神): A young man dressed in bright silk robes, with a handsome face that is almost seductive. Created by Linglong, he is also known as the Beast Demon and is among the most powerful individual in the book. He once fought the Immortal-slaying Blade Formation barehanded. His magical weapon is the Fire-Gathering Basin, his pet is Taotie, and he becomes friendly with Zhang Xiaofan and Xiaobai.

== Adaptations and related works ==
=== Sequel ===
Xiao Ding later wrote Zhu Xian II (Chinese: 诛仙二), a sequel to the original novel. It began serialization on Motie Chinese in April 2012, but was later suspended and remained unfinished.

=== Television ===
Zhu Xian was adapted into the 2016 Chinese television drama Noble Aspirations (Chinese: 青云志), also known as The Legend of Chusen, starring Li Yifeng, Zhao Liying and Yang Zi.

=== Comics ===
A manhua adaptation has been published in Chinese and has also circulated in English under titles such as Celestial Destroyer.

=== Film ===
A live-action film adaptation, Jade Dynasty (Chinese: 诛仙 I), directed by Ching Siu-tung and starring Xiao Zhan, Li Qin and Meng Meiqi, was released in China in 2019.

=== Animation ===
The novel has also been adapted into a Chinese animated series, commonly released in English-language listings as Jade Dynasty or Zhu Xian, 2022.

=== Games ===
Perfect World developed online games based on the novel, including the MMORPG Zhu Xian, released internationally as Jade Dynasty, as well as later titles such as Zhu Xian Mobile and Zhu Xian World.
