= Shaun Smith (make-up effects artist) =

American makeup artist

- Born: Rockford, Illinois, U.S.
- Occupation: Special make-up effects artist
- Website: http://www.shaunsmithfx.com/

Shaun Smith is an American special make-up effects supervisor, prosthetic designer, creature fabricator, and puppeteer. His notable credits include 300, Face/Off, Conan the Barbarian, I Am Legend, ' Dawn of the Dead, Starship Troopers, and the Disney+ miniseries Obi-Wan Kenobi Miniseries.

== Career ==
Smith worked for several years in makeup and creature effects before taking on a supervising role in the mid‑1990s at Kevin Yagher’s effects shop, where he supervised work on The Fan, Face/Off, Conspiracy Theory, and Starship Troopers. He also performed as part of the six‑person puppeteering team that operated the Crypt Keeper puppet for Tales from the Crypt (season 7) and the feature film Bordello of Blood.

Smith collaborated with director Zack Snyder on Dawn of the Dead (2004) and 300 (2006). For Dawn of the Dead he was hired as prosthetics foreman for David Anderson’s AFX. On 300 Smith served as makeup and creature effects supervisor, helping to develop the stylized airbrushed makeups, prosthetics, and creature designs that contributed to the film’s visual look.

In interviews he has noted the extensive makeup demands of those productions and described working with Snyder as enjoyable.

Smith spent nine months on location in China from 2010 through 2011 for Soi Cheang’s The Monkey King (2014). While there he led an international effects crew and trained a large local team in prosthetic application and creature‑effects techniques. He continued work on the franchise through The Monkey King 2 (2016) and The Monkey King 3 (2018), supervising makeup and creature builds for the trilogy.

Smith served as prosthetic supervisor on the Disney+ miniseries Obi-Wan Kenobi, overseeing the creation and application of full‑body and facial prosthetics across the series, including for Darth Vader’s on-screen appearance. Actor Hayden Christensen credited Shaun Smith and his team's work as essential to bringing Darth Vader's look to life.

== Partial filmography ==
- She's Got No Name 2 (2026)
- She's Got No Name (2024)
- Ferrari (2023 film) (2023)
- Obi Wan Kenobi (2022)
- Secrets of Blackmoor:The true history of dungeons & dragons (2019)
- The Monkey King 3 (2018)
- Eternal Wave (2017)
- The Monkey King 2 (2016)
- Hap and Leonard (TV series) (2016)
- Exeter (2015)
- The Monkey King (2014)
- John Wick 2014
- Eagleheart (TV series) (2013-2014)
- The Cabin in the Woods (2012)
- Conan the Barbarian (2011)
- The Warrior and the Wolf (2009)
- The Forbidden Kingdom (2008)
- I Am Legend (2007)
- 300 (2006)
- End of the Spear (2005)
- Dawn of the Dead (2004)

== Awards ==
Smith's work in 300 was nominated for Best Makeup at the 34th annual Saturn Awards, as well as recognized at the 80th Academy Awards "bakeoff". His work in Conan the Barbarian was also nominated in the 38th Saturn Awards.
