= The Heir to the Throne =

2024 Hong Kong television series

- Also known as: 家族榮耀之繼承者
- Genre: Family saga; Romance
- Written by: Wong Kwok-fai; Siu Kwong-hon
- Directed by: Choi Ching-shing; Chan San-hap
- Starring: Charmaine Sheh; Raymond Lam; Him Law
- Opening theme: "Still Three Thousand of Us (愛在三千的宇宙)" by Raymond Lam
- Original language: Cantonese
- No. of episodes: 30

Production
- Executive producers: Xie Ying; Tommy Leung
- Producer: Chan Tak-sau
- Production locations: Hong Kong; Malaysia
- Running time: approx. 45 minutes per episode
- Production companies: Youku; Media Asia

Original release
- Network: TVB Jade; myTV Super; Youku
- Release: 13 May – 21 June 2024

The Heir to the Throne (Chinese: 家族榮耀之繼承者) is a Hong Kong family drama television series co-produced by the Chinese streaming platform Youku and Hong Kong's Media Asia. Starring Charmaine Sheh, Raymond Lam, and Him Law, it follows the affluent Yau family as internal rivalries and power struggles threaten their empire. Although marketed as a sequel to 2022's Modern Dynasty, the storyline is completely independent from the original series.

== Cast ==
- Charmaine Sheh as Charlotte Yau Hou-yee, Yau Sau-yan's daughter and the eldest granddaughter of the Yau conglomerate
- Raymond Lam as Ko Chun, a lawyer and Charlotte's ex-boyfriend who remains her friend
- Him Law as Brian Yau Chi-pan, Yau Sau-yee's son and the presumed heir of the Yau conglomerate
- Jeannie Chan as Noelle Yau Chi-tung, Yau Sau-yee's daughter and a lawyer
- Toby Leung as Nana Yau Chi-lam, Yau Sau-yee's daughter
- Venus Wong as Linda Ma Hiu-ling, Charlotte's close friend and Brian's secretary
- Lau Kong as Yau Hon-yeung, chairman and head of the Yau conglomerate
- Benz Hui as Yau Sau-yan, eldest son of the Yau conglomerate
- Dada Chan as Niki Chu Lai-kei, Yau Sau-yan's current wife
- Mimi Kung as Ho Mei-ying, Yau Sau-yan's ex-wife and Charlotte's mother
- Gallen Lo as Yau Sau-yee, the second son of the Yau conglomerate
- Candice Yu as Thye Yi-ting, Yau Sau-yee's first wife
- Betsy Cheung as Siu Ka-bik, Yau Sau-yee's second wife
- Raymond Wong as Rio Chiu Kai-pong, CEO of the Shiu conglomerate
- Hugo Ng as Ko Sing, Ko Chun's father and ex-Yau chairman's chauffeur
- Inez Leong as Gigi, the daughter of a Malaysian tycoon and Brian's girlfriend
- Wilfred Lau as Andy Lau, a police officer
- Rainbow Ching as Rio's mother

== Production ==
Some filming occurred in Malaysia over a two-month period.

== Plot ==
The series follows the Yau family, owners of the Yau Group conglomerate, as internal conflict arises over succession when the family patriarch, Yau Hon-yeung (Lau Kong), suffers a stroke. Prior to his illness, Hon-yeung appoints his granddaughter, Charlotte Yau (Charmaine Sheh) as trustee and acting chairwoman in a controversial arrangement, despite her long-standing marginalization within the male-dominated family. Her appointment triggers opposition from other family members, including Brian Yau (Him Law) and Yau Sau-yee (Gallen Lo), who seek control of the company.

As Charlotte assumes leadership, she faces internal resistance, corporate misconduct, and criminal investigations involving the group's subsidiaries, while uncovering concealed family matters such as falsified identities and Brian's true parentage. She receives legal assistance from Ko Chun (Raymond Lam), a lawyer with whom she previously had a romantic relationship, though his own family connections complicate the situation. Conflicts among Yau family members and their spouses intensify, leading to legal disputes, shifting alliances, and acts of retaliation.

In the latter part of the series, tensions escalate when Brian accidentally kills his sister during a confrontation. Attempts to conceal the incident prompt further investigations and instability within the family. The conflict reaches its climax when Brian kills Yau Sau-yee in a subsequent violent confrontation. Brian attempts to flee but is injured and falls into a coma. The series concludes with Brian still in a coma and the succession dispute resolved, accompanied by a reorganization of the family's power structure.

== Music ==
Track Listing
No.	Title	Lyrics	Music	Artist(s)	Length
1.	"Still Three Thousand of Us (愛在三千的宇宙)"	KW Chu Man-hei	KW Chu Man-hei	Raymond Lam	3:37
2.	"Erased Timelines (已刪除的時間線)"	KW Chu Man-hei	KW Chu Man-hei	Feanna Wong	3:33
3.	"Deepest Love (遺憾美)"	Tsang Lok-tung	Terry Chui & Robin Ch'i	Raymond Lam	3:20

== Ratings and reception ==
In Hong Kong, the series ranked first on Google's 2024 "Top Ten Most Searched TV Dramas" list, and its finale peaked at 1.66 million viewers.

Week	Episodes	Airing dates	Ratings (Note: According to Hong Kong's TV rating system, each rating point represents approximately 64,670 viewers.)		Ref.
Week	Episodes	Airing dates	Cross-platform peak ratings	Viewership	Ref.
1	1 – 5	13–17 May 2024	24.3 points	1.58 million	
2	6 – 10	20–24 May 2024	23.4 points	1.52 million	
3	11 – 15	27–31 May 2024	23.2 points	1.50 million	
4	16 – 20	3–7 June 2024	24.2 points	1.57 million	
5	21 – 25	10–14 June 2024	22.6 points	1.47 million	
6	26 – 30	17–21 June 2024	25.5 points	1.66 million	
