= Soi Cheang =

Hong Kong filmmaker (born 1972)

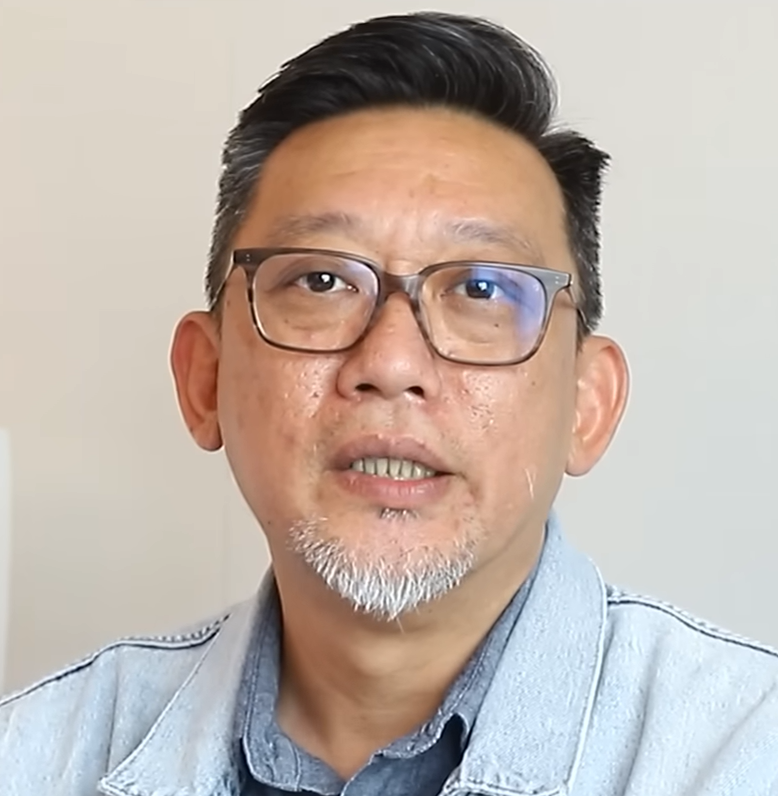
- Cheang in May 2024
- Born: Cheang Pou-soi; 11 July 1972 (age 54); Portuguese Macau
- Other name: Bob Cheng
- Occupations: Film director; screenwriter; film producer
- Notable work: Full list

Chinese name
- Traditional Chinese: 鄭保瑞
- Simplified Chinese: 郑保瑞
Transcriptions

Soi Cheang (born 11 July 1972), also known as Bob Cheng or by his birth name Cheang Pou-soi, (Note: Chinese: 鄭保瑞; Jyutping: zeng6 bou2 seoi6) is a Macau-born Hong Kong filmmaker. Known for his contribution to action crime films, his works Motorway (2012), Limbo (2021), Mad Fate (2023), and Twilight of the Warriors: Walled In (2024) earned him four Best Director nominations at the Hong Kong Film Awards, which he won for the latter two.

Cheang's films have regularly appeared at international film festivals; Accident (2009) was selected to be in Competition section of Venice Film Festival, Limbo (2021) and Mad Fate (2023) were selected to be in the Berlinale Special section of Berlin International Film Festival, and Twilight of the Warriors: Walled In (2024) was selected to be in the Official Selection (Midnight Screening) of the Cannes Film Festival.

In addition to directing action crime films, Cheang was also directed The Monkey King trilogy, the third of which he also produced. His other production credits include Paradox (2017) and I'm Livin' It (2019), which earned him two Best Film nominations at the Hong Kong Film Awards, as well as The Sunny Side of the Street (2022), which earned him the Golden Horse Award for Best Narrative Feature nomination.

== Filmography ==
=== Feature films ===
Year	English title	Original title	Notes
1999	Our Last Day	第100日	
1999	The House of No Man	摩登姑婆屋	Also as story writer
1999	Beach Girl	水著青春救生	
2000	Diamond Hill	發光石頭	Also as screenwriter
2001	Horror Hotline... Big Head Monster	恐怖熱線之大頭怪嬰	Also as screenwriter
2002	New Blood	熱血青年	Also as screenwriter
2003	The Death Curse	古宅心慌慌	
2004	Love Battlefield	愛·作戰	
2004	Hidden Heroes	追擊8月15	
2005	Home Sweet Home	怪物	
2006	Dog Bite Dog	狗咬狗	
2007	Shamo	軍雞	
2009	Accident	暗殺	
2012	Motorway	車手	
2014	The Monkey King	西游記之大鬧天宮	
2015	SPL II: A Time for Consequences	殺破狼2	
2016	The Monkey King 2	西遊記之孫悟空三打白骨精	
2018	The Monkey King 3	西遊記女兒國	Also as producer
2021	Limbo	智齒	
2023	Mad Fate	命案	Also as executive producer
2024	Twilight of the Warriors: Walled In	九龍城寨之圍城	Also as executive producer
2026	Peacekeeper Elite: Metro Escape	和平精英：地铁逃生	Web short film Also as producer
TBA	The Belief	澎湖海战	Also as producer

=== Other credits ===
Year	Film	Notes
2003	Love for All Seasons	Actor, credit as "Policeman"
2015	Two Thumbs Up	Producer
2017	Paradox	Producer
2017	The Brink	Producer
2019	I'm Livin' It	Producer
2020	Double World	Producer
2022	The Sunny Side of the Street	Producer
2023	Cyber Heist	Producer
2023	Dust to Dust	Producer
2025	Behind the Shadows	Producer

== Awards and nominations ==
Year	Award	Category	Nominated work	Result	Ref.
2022	Golden Horse Awards	Best Director	Limbo	Nominated	
2013	Hong Kong Film Awards	Best Director	Motorway	Nominated	
2022	Hong Kong Film Awards	Best Director	Limbo	Nominated	
2024	Hong Kong Film Awards	Best Director	Mad Fate	Won	
2025	Hong Kong Film Awards	Best Director	Twilight of the Warriors: Walled In	Won	
