= Up Idol =

Chinese variety show

- Genre: Reality show
- Starring: See below
- Ending theme: "You Are the Idol"
- Country of origin: China
- Original language: Standard Chinese
- No. of seasons: 3
- No. of episodes: 36

Production
- Camera setup: Multicamera setup
- Running time: 90 minutes
- Production company: Hunan Broadcasting System

Original release
- Network: Hunan Television
- Release: August 1, 2015 – October 20, 2017

Up Idol

Chinese name (in 2015)
- Traditional Chinese: 偶像來了
- Simplified Chinese: 偶像来了
- Literal meaning: The Idols are Coming
Transcriptions
Standard Mandarin
- Hanyu Pinyin: Ǒuxiàng Láile

Chinese name (since 2016)
- Traditional Chinese: 我們來了
- Simplified Chinese: 我们来了
- Literal meaning: We are Coming
Transcriptions
Standard Mandarin
- Hanyu Pinyin: Wǒmen Láile

Up Idol (simplified Chinese: 偶像来了; traditional Chinese: 偶像來了; pinyin: Ǒuxiàng Láile; lit. 'The Idols are Coming') is a Chinese celebrity reality show broadcast on Hunan Television. The first season debuted on 1 August 2015 with 12 episodes featuring two captains and ten popular celebrities as they travel to different places and experience the Chinese culture. The program was relaunched in 2016. The Chinese title was changed to We are Coming (simplified Chinese: 我们来了; traditional Chinese: 我們來了; pinyin: Wǒmen Láile) though the official English title remains unchanged as Up Idol. The second season debuted on 22 July 2016 with 12 episodes. The third season debuted on 4 August 2017 with 12 episodes.

== Participants ==
=== Season 1 ===
Name	Profession	Birthdate & Age
Captains
Wang Han	Television presenter	7 April 1974 (age 52)
He Jiong	Actor; director; singer; teacher; television presenter; writer	28 April 1974 (age 52)
Idol members
Brigitte Lin	Actress; writer	3 November 1954 (age 71)
Yang Yuying	Singer	11 May 1971 (age 55)
Athena Chu	Actress; singer	25 October 1971 (age 54)
Ning Jing	Actress; fashion designer; model	27 April 1972 (age 54)
Ada Choi	Actress	17 September 1973 (age 52)
Xie Na	Actress; singer; television presenter	6 May 1981 (age 45)
Zhao Liying	Actress; singer	16 October 1987 (age 38)
Baby Zhang	Actress; singer; television presenter	9 April 1989 (age 37)
Gülnezer Bextiyar	Actress; model	2 May 1992 (age 34)
Ouyang Nana	Actress; musician; singer	15 June 2000 (age 25)

=== Season 2 ===
Name	Profession	Birthdate & Age
Captains
Wang Han	Television presenter	7 April 1974 (age 52)
Yuan Hong	Actor; singer; television presenter	23 August 1982 (age 43)
Idol members
Angie Chiu	Actress	15 November 1954 (age 71)
Carina Lau	Actress	8 December 1965 (age 60)
Karen Mok	Actress; fashion designer; producer; singer-songwriter	2 June 1970 (age 55)
Joe Chen	Actress; singer; television presenter	4 April 1979 (age 47)
Xie Na	Actress; singer; television presenter	6 May 1981 (age 45)
Jiang Yiyan	Actress; singer; writer	11 September 1983 (age 42)
Ming Xi	Actress; model	8 March 1989 (age 37)
Xu Jiao	Actress	5 August 1997 (age 28)

=== Season 3 ===
==== Captains and idol members ====
Name	Profession	Birthdate & Age
Captains
Wu Xiubo	Actor	5 September 1968 (age 57)
Wang Han	Television presenter	7 April 1974 (age 52)
Idol members
Rosamund Kwan	Actress	24 September 1962 (age 63)
Jiang Xin	Actress	8 May 1983 (age 43)
Michelle Chen	Actress; singer	31 May 1983 (age 42)
Victoria Song	Actress; model; singer; television presenter	2 February 1987 (age 39)
Shen Mengchen	Actress; television presenter	13 June 1989 (age 36)
Tang Yixin	Actress	9 December 1989 (age 36)

==== Non-idol members ====
Name	Profession	Birthdate & Age	Station(s)
Yu Jia	Entrepreneurial	29 December 1989 (age 36)	1
Winnie Wen	Writer	6 March 1996 (age 30)	2
Li Shuang	Gourmet	23 May 1994 (age 32)	4
Caroline Li	Illustrator	2 November 1987 (age 38)	2–3, 5–6
Ai Hua	Student	30 September 1995 (age 30)	1, 3–6
Xiao Bai	Stylist	21 February 1990 (age 36)	1–6
Xu Jiru	Lawyer	8 September 1992 (age 33)	1–6

== Episodes ==
=== Season 1 ===
Station	EP	Air date	Filming date(s)	Location	Guest Appearance	The Most Popular Idol
1st Leg	1	1 August 2015	1–2 July 2015	Hainan Airlines; Haikou, Hainan		Xie Na
1st Leg	2	8 August 2015	1–2 July 2015	Hainan Airlines; Haikou, Hainan		Xie Na
2nd Leg	2	8 August 2015	18–19 July 2015	Inner Mongolian Grassland; Hulunbuir, Inner Mongolia		Zhao Liying
2nd Leg	3	15 August 2015	18–19 July 2015	Inner Mongolian Grassland; Hulunbuir, Inner Mongolia		Zhao Liying
3rd Leg	4	22 August 2015	2–3 August 2015	798 Art Zone; Beijing	TFBOYS	Brigitte Lin
3rd Leg	5	29 August 2015	2–3 August 2015	798 Art Zone; Beijing	Sean Zhang	Brigitte Lin
4th Leg	6	12 September 2015	15–16 August 2015	Hunan Broadcasting System; Changsha, Hunan		Ada Choi
4th Leg	7	19 September 2015	15–16 August 2015	Hunan Broadcasting System; Changsha, Hunan		Ada Choi
5th Leg	8	26 September 2015	1–2 September 2015	Chengkancun; Chengkan Township, Huizhou District, Huangshan, Anhui		Athena Chu
5th Leg	9	3 October 2015	1–2 September 2015	Chengkancun; Chengkan Township, Huizhou District, Huangshan, Anhui		Athena Chu
5th Leg	10	10 October 2015	1–2 September 2015	Chengkancun; Chengkan Township, Huizhou District, Huangshan, Anhui		Athena Chu
6th Leg	10	10 October 2015	16–17 September 2015	Shanghai		Ouyang Nana
6th Leg	11	17 October 2015	16–17 September 2015	Shanghai	Tong Zirong	Ouyang Nana
6th Leg	12	24 October 2015	16–17 September 2015	Shanghai	Stan Lai; William Chang	Ouyang Nana

=== Season 2 ===
Station	EP	Air date	Filming date(s)	Location	Guest Appearance
1st Leg	1	22 July 2016	17–19 June 2016	Macau	Zou Shiming
1st Leg	2	29 July 2016	17–19 June 2016	Macau	
2nd Leg	3	5 August 2016	10–12 July 2016	Suzhou; Jiangsu	
2nd Leg	4	12 August 2016	10–12 July 2016	Suzhou; Jiangsu	Fei Yu-ching
3rd Leg	5	19 August 2016	28–29 July 2016	Chengdu; Sichuan	
3rd Leg	6	26 August 2016	28–29 July 2016	Chengdu; Sichuan	Sean Zhang; Guo Pei
4th Leg	7	2 September 2016	12–15 August 2016	Tengchong; Baoshan, Yunnan	Song Xiaobao
4th Leg	8	9 September 2016	12–15 August 2016	Tengchong; Baoshan, Yunnan	Yang Wei; Bao Chunlai
5th Leg	9	16 September 2016	26–28 August 2016	Dalian; Liaoning	Sun Yang; Zhang Jike
5th Leg	10	23 September 2016	26–28 August 2016	Dalian; Liaoning	
6th Leg	11	30 September 2016	4–6 September 2016	Turpan; Xinjiang	
6th Leg	12	7 October 2016	4–6 September 2016	Turpan; Xinjiang	

=== Season 3 ===
Station	EP	Air date	Filming date(s)	Location	Guest Appearance
1st Leg	1	4 August 2017	13–14 July 2017	Beijing	
1st Leg	2	11 August 2017	13–14 July 2017	Beijing	China women's national judo team Wang Peiyi
2nd Leg	3	18 August 2017	4–5 August 2017	Foshan; Guangdong	
2nd Leg	4	25 August 2017	4–5 August 2017	Foshan; Guangdong	Yuen Woo-ping
3rd Leg	5	1 September 2017	18–19 August 2017	Yongzhou; Hunan	
3rd Leg	6	8 September 2017	18–19 August 2017	Yongzhou; Hunan	
4th Leg	7	15 September 2017	30–31 August 2017	Harbin; Heilongjiang	
4th Leg	8	22 September 2017	30–31 August 2017	Harbin; Heilongjiang	He Wei; Hai Jia; Tan Yuanyuan
5th Leg	9	29 September 2017	17–19 September 2017	Xi'an; Shaanxi	
5th Leg	10	6 October 2017	17–19 September 2017	Xi'an; Shaanxi	Coco Lee; Sitar Tan; Tizzy T
6th Leg	11	13 October 2017	29–30 September 2017	Dongshan County; Zhangzhou, Fujian	
6th Leg	12	20 October 2017	29–30 September 2017	Dongshan County; Zhangzhou, Fujian	

== Broadcast TV stations ==
Start on July 29, 2016, Astro Quan Jia HD air Up Idol simultaneously broadcast with Hunan Television on Fridays 19:50.
