= Days of Our Own =

- Poster
- Chinese: 我们的十年
- Directed by: Joe Ma; Liu Hai
- Written by: Meng Xiaobo; Ye Xiaozhou
- Produced by: Chen Xiaobo
- Starring: Zhao Liying; Qiao Renliang; Emma Wu; Ban Jiajia; Van Fan; Feng Mingchao
- Distributed by: Dadi Shidai Media (Beijing); Haining Mantou Media; Beijing Jiecheng Century Technology; Beijing United Film Artists; Beijing Huangying Entertainment
- Release date: September 2, 2016
- Running time: 90 minutes
- Country: China
- Language: Mandarin
- Box office: CN¥43.4 million

Days of Our Own is a 2016 Chinese coming-of-age drama film directed by Joe Ma and Liu Hai and starring Zhao Liying, Qiao Renliang, Emma Wu, Ban Jiajia, Van Fan and Feng Mingchao. It was released in China on September 2, 2016.

== Plot ==
The story follows three different girls with unique personalities in a span of 10 years (2003-2013), as they grow and work toward their dreams. Zhang Jingyi is an intelligent tomboy and her motto in life is for everyone to be happy; Chen Yinuo is a rich, temperamental girl from a wealthy family; and Liang Xiaoyi is a girl desperate to reach her dreams.

== Cast ==
- Zhao Liying
- Qiao Renliang
- Emma Wu
- Ban Jiajia
- Van Fan
- Feng Mingchao
