= New Blood (2002 film) =

2002 Hong Kong film by Soi Cheang

- Traditional Chinese: 熱血青年
- Jyutping: Jit^{6} Hyut^{3} Cing^{1} Nin^{4}
- Directed by: Cheang Pou-soi
- Written by: Cheang Pou-soi; Szeto Kam-Yuen
- Produced by: Joe Ma; Ivy Kong; Yip Kwong-Kim (葉廣儉)
- Cinematography: Ko Chiu-Lam (高照林)
- Edited by: Azrael Chung (鍾煒釗); Angie Lam (林安兒)
- Music by: Koo Lai-Yip (辜澧業)
- Production companies: Emperor Multimedia Group; Singing Horse Productions
- Distributed by: Mei Ah Entertainment (Hong Kong); Emperor Motion Pictures (worldwide)
- Release date: 25 October 2002
- Running time: 89 minutes
- Country: Hong Kong
- Language: Cantonese
- Box office: HK$1,696,265

New Blood (Chinese: 熱血青年; Jyutping: Jit^{6} Hyut^{3} Cing^{1} Nin^{4}) is a 2002 Hong Kong horror film directed by Cheang Pou-soi.

== Plot ==
A newlywed wife is dying of cancer, so she and her husband attempt double suicide, slitting their wrists in a car in a dark alley. They are found by the police when another person commits suicide by jumping from a building onto their car, and the couple are rushed to a hospital, which does not have any of the rare blood type AB negative required for blood transfusions. Three donors, including a woman named Joy with a family history of mental illness and the policeman who found the couple, donate blood to save the couple. The husband is saved and remains in a coma, but the wife dies. Joy sees visions of the wife's spirit, who is angered that she has been separated from her husband and pursues the three donors.

== Cast ==
- Niki Chow as Joy
- Bernard Chow as Lok
- Chow Chi-Kui as Lik
- Winnie Leung as Yau Yin-Ping
- Marco Lok as Jack
- Chiu Yue-Ming as Joy's mother
- Hau Woon-Ling as Mrs. Chan
- Chow Chi-Fai as Master Sum
- Hui Kam-Fung as Dr. Liu
- Yu Sai-Tang as Psychiatrist

== Release ==
New Blood was released in Hong Kong on 25 October 2002 with a II B rating.

== Reception ==
Reviewer Kenneth Brorsson of sogoodreviews.com wrote that "it's Soi Cheang's horror vision that carries this movie, at times really well. [...] Soi is a stylish filmmaker, not necessarily one that speeds up a film for style but one that has proven to be effective when he is tossing the camera around in otherworldly angles. One thing he does know is that the best horror comes out of stillness and he continues to live by that motto in New Blood. His horror imagery isn't exactly outstanding but he's out to give his best without overdoing it."

Reviewer Slimdods of darksidereviews.com gave the film a rating of 6 out of 10, writing that "Soi Cheang delivers an interesting film, but one that is sometimes a little too messy overall. [...] The director once again proves himself a master of visual storytelling, thanks in particular to sophisticated direction and surprisingly dark, blood-curdling cinematography. One can even see an influence of the chiaroscuro style, with saturated white highlights against a backdrop of bluish-black shadows! Visually, there's nothing to say on that front because New Blood is a real little marvel. But the purely visual beauty of New Blood is counterbalanced by a sometimes enigmatic editing style, leading to a certain confusion that occasionally borders on incomprehension!"

Reviewer M.C. Thomason of fareastfilms.com wrote, "An oft-shocking blend of contemporary horror and traditional Chinese folklore, 'New Blood' is a smart, efficient and alarmingly effective genre piece that sits effortlessly alongside some of the finer horror entries of the period as an unremittingly morbid and blood-curdling exercise in unadulterated terror."

== Accolades ==
Soi Cheang was nominated for a Best New Director award for New Blood at the 22nd Hong Kong Film Awards.

The film was one of the recommended films awarded the Film of Merit award at the 9th Hong Kong Film Critics Society Awards in 2003.

Soi Cheang won the Denis-de-Rougemont Youth Award, and the film was nominated for the Narcisse Award - Best Feature Film at the 3rd Neuchâtel International Fantastic Film Festival in 2003.
