= Rookie Agent Rouge =

- Promotional poster
- Also known as: Yan Zhi
- Genre: Spy; Action
- Written by: Wang Biao; Xu Jizhou
- Directed by: Xu Jizhou
- Starring: Zhao Liying; Lu Yi; Tao Xinran; Mickey Yuan
- Country of origin: China
- Original language: Mandarin
- No. of seasons: 1
- No. of episodes: 45

Production
- Production companies: Hairun Media; Haining Yuehua Kai Media; New Classics Media

Original release
- Network: Dragon TV, Zhejiang TV
- Release: 27 September – 21 October 2017

Rookie Agent Rouge (Chinese: 胭脂) is 2016 Chinese television series directed by Xu Zizhou, starring Zhao Liying and Lu Yi. The series aired on Dragon TV and Zhejiang TV from 27 September to 21 October 2016. The drama is currently licensed by Netflix.

== Synopsis ==
Lan Yanzhi (Rouge) is a privileged banker's daughter in Shanghai and a student activist who mistakenly comes into possession of a letter from the Japanese Army in 1937. Song Mian, an undercover agent for the Kuomintang, mistakes her for a spy. To prove her innocence, Yan Zhi agrees to infiltrate the home of her best friend, Feng Man'na, and help Song Mian track down a mysterious traitor. Finding the spy turns Yan Zhi and Man'na from friends to bitter enemies, as both get involved in the confused fighting in late 1930s Shanghai featuring Japanese, Nationalists and Communists. Unusually, the chief Japanese agent, Aoki, is very sympathetically portrayed.

== Cast ==
=== Main ===
- Zhao Liying as Lan Yanzhi
- Lu Yi as Zhou Yuhao
- Tao Xinran as Feng Man'na
- Mickey Yuan as Song Mian

=== Supporting ===
- Shu Yaoxuan as Lan Changming, Yan Zhi's father
- Ma Cancan as Lin Tianmu
- Zhao Shuting
- Wang Zichen as Zhang Guosheng
- Gao Xin as Ying Zi / Zhou Hanguang

== Soundtrack ==
Rookie Agent Rouge - Original Television Soundtrack (胭脂电视剧原声音乐大碟)
No.	Title	Music	Length
1.	"Rookie Agent Rouge (胭脂序曲)" (Opening theme song)	Dongdong Dong
2.	"Yearning (心念)" (Ending theme song)	Zanilia Zhao
3.	"Love Makes Me Brave (爱让我勇敢)"	Silence Wang

== Ratings ==
Air date	Episode	Dragon TV CSM52 City ratings			Air date	Episode	Zhejiang TV CSM52 City ratings		
Air date	Episode	Ratings	Audience share	Rank	Air date	Episode	Ratings	Audience share	Rank
2016.9.27	1	0.648	2.16	5	2016.9.27	1	0.365	1.15	13
2016.9.28	2-3	0.613	1.86	5	2016.9.29	2-3	0.468	1.43	8
2016.9.29	4-5	0.697	2.1	3	2016.9.29	4-5	0.567	1.71	5
2016.9.30	6-7	0.867	2.588	2	2016.9.30	6-7	0.695	2.081	3
2016.10.1	8	0.570	1.905	4	201610.1	8	0.495	1.647	7
2016.10.2	9-10	0.679	2.168	3	2016.10.2	9-10	0.597	1.896	5
2016.10.3	11-12	0.727	2.306	2	2016.10.3	11-12	0.543	1.723	6
2016.10.4	13-14	0.780	2.384	2	2016.10.4	13-14	0.601	1.833	5
2016.10.5	15-16	0.815	2.48	3	2016.10.5	15-16	0.749	2.3	4
2016.10.6	17-18	0.775	2.17	3	2016.10.6	17-18	0.749	2.13	4
2016.10.7	19-20	0.802	2.243	3	-	-	-	-	-
2016.10.8	21	0.818	2.42	3	2016.10.8	21	0.554	1.64	7
2016.10.9	22-23	0.898	2.61	2	2016.10.9	22-23	0.697	2.03	5
2016.10.10	24-25	0.914	2.7	2	2013.10.10	24-25	0.7	2.08	5
2016.10.11	26-27	0.85	2.52	2	2016.10.11	26-27	0.722	2.14	5
2016.10.12	28-29	0.977	2.91	2	2016.10.12	28-29	0.841	2.52	3
2016.10.13	30-31	0.928	2.75	2	2016.10.13	30-31	0.726	2.17	4
2016.10.14	32-33	1.159	3.33	1	2016.10.14	32-33	1.009	2.9	2
2016.10.15	34	1.023	3.03	1	2016.10.15	34	0.9	2.66	2
2016.10.16	35-36	1.096	3.17	1	2016.10.16	35-36	0.876	2.54	3
2016.10.17	37-38	1.001	3.00	2	2016.10.17	37-38	0.778	2.34	5
2016.10.18	39-40	1.034	3.06	2	2016.10.18	39-40	0.715	2.15	6
2016.10.19	41-42	1.068	3.12	2	2016.10.19	41-42	0.816	2.39	6
2016.10.20	43-44	1.271	3.65	2	2016.10.20	43-44	0.92	2.66	5
2016.10.21	45	1.241	3.53	2	2016.10.21	45	0.977	2.77	3

- Highest ratings are marked in red, lowest ratings are marked in blue

== Awards and nominations ==
Year	Award	Category	Nominee	Result	Ref.
2017	2nd Chinese TV Drama Quality Awards	Most Talented Actress	Zhao Liying	Won	
2017	22nd Huading Awards	Best Actor (Revolutionary-Era Drama)	Lu Yi	Won	
