= Zhao Liying =

Chinese actress (born 1987)

- 赵丽颖
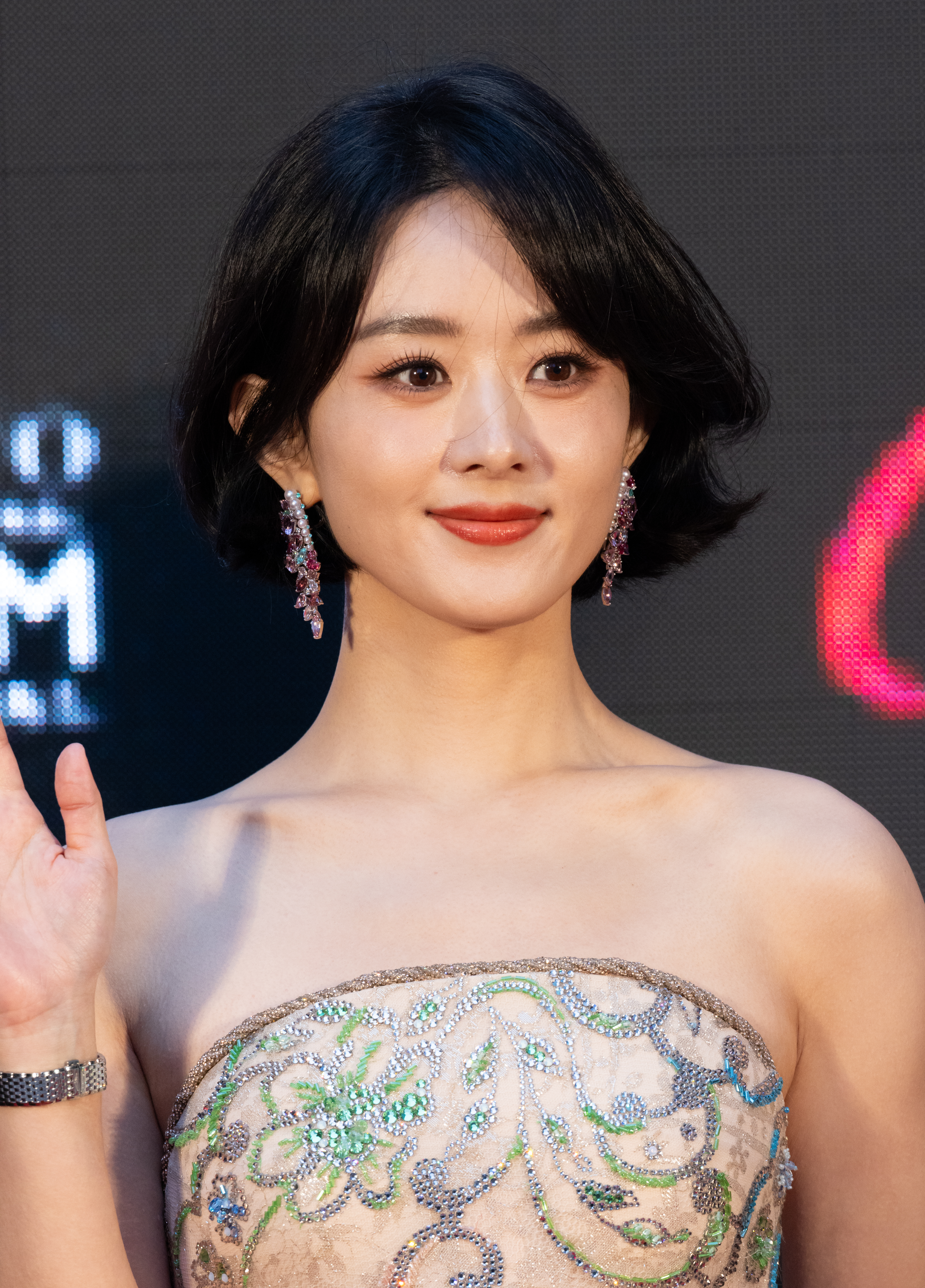
- Zhao at the 37th Tokyo International Film Festival in 2024
- Born: October 16, 1987 (age 38); Langfang, Hebei, China
- Other name: Zanilia Zhao
- Education: Langfang School of Electronic Information Engineering
- Occupation: Actress
- Years active: 2006–present
- Agent: Hesong Media
- Spouse: Feng Shaofeng (m. 2018; div. 2021)
- Children: 1

Chinese name
- Traditional Chinese: 趙麗穎
- Simplified Chinese: 赵丽颖
Transcriptions
Standard Mandarin
- Hanyu Pinyin: Zhào Lìyǐng

Zhao Liying (Chinese: 赵丽颖, born October 16, 1987), also known as Zanilia Zhao, is a Chinese actress. She rose to prominence with the historical drama Legend of Lu Zhen (2013), followed by the television dramas Boss & Me (2014), The Journey of Flower (2015), The Mystic Nine (2016), Noble Aspirations (2016), Princess Agents (2017), The Story of Minglan (2018), Legend of Fei (2020), and The Legend of Shen Li (2024). Zhao won Best Actress at the Flying Apsaras Awards and Golden Eagle Awards for her performance in Wild Bloom (2022). Her notable films include Duckweed (2017), The Monkey King 3 (2018), and Article 20 (2024).

== Early life ==
Zhao was born on October 16, 1987, in Langfang, Hebei. She graduated from Langfang School of Electronic Information Engineering, a secondary professional training school.

== Career ==
=== 2006–2012: Beginnings ===
In 2006, Zhao Liying participated in the Yahoo Search Star Game and became the final winner. She subsequently signed with Huayi Brothers. In 2007, Zhao made her acting debut in the family drama Golden Marriage directed by Zheng Xiaolong.

In 2009, Zhao took on her first historical drama role in The Firmament of The Pleiades. The series was broadcast on Japanese channel NHK and earned critical acclaim. Zhao received the Most Popular Actress award at the Chinese Creative Short Video Awards.

In 2010, she first started to gain recognition from mainland audiences after appearing in The Dream of Red Mansions (2010), based on the novel of the same name by Cao Xueqin. In 2011, Zhao's popularity rose following her role as Princess Qing'er in New My Fair Princess.

=== 2013–2015: Breakthrough ===
In 2013, Zhao starred in historical drama Legend of Lu Zhen, based on the novel Female Prime Minister (女相) by Zhang Wei, playing an ordinary girl who worked her way up to become the first female prime minister during the Northern Qi dynasty. The drama was a hit domestically, and also overseas in South Korea and Japan, leading to increased recognition for Zhao in the region. Zhao won several newcomer and popularity awards at local award ceremonies. The same year, Zhao starred in historical romance film Palace: Lock Sinensis, the fourth and final installment of the Gong series by Yu Zheng. Contrary to her usual sweet and nice image, Zhao plays a scheming and evil princess in the film.

In 2014, Zhao starred in the romantic comedy drama Boss & Me, based on Gu Man's popular novel Shan Shan Comes to Eat. The series topped ratings in its timeslot in China, and also earned high popularity overseas. Zhao further solidified her popularity with several high rated dramas in 2014, including The Legend of Chasing Fish and Wife's Secret. Zhao's soaring popularity thanks to her various successful acting projects led to her being crowned the "Golden Eagle Goddess" at the 10th China Golden Eagle TV Art Festival, where she performed as the opening act to the ceremony.

In 2015, Zhao starred in xianxia romance drama The Journey of Flower. The drama was a huge success in China, achieving a peak rating of 3.89 and also became the first Chinese drama to surpass 20 billion online views. The success of the drama brought Zhao's career to greater heights. Zhao won numerous accolades for her role in The Journey of Flower, including the Audience's Choice for Actress at the 28th China TV Golden Eagle Award. Zhao was also nominated for the Magnolia Award for Best Actress in a Television Series. The same year, she starred in modern workplace drama Best Get Going, and wuxia drama Legend of Zu Mountain.

=== 2016–present: Mainstream success ===
In 2016, Zhao starred in action adventure drama The Mystic Nine, playing a sassy and haughty heiress. The series was a commercial success, accumulating over 10 billion views in total. Zhao won the Best Actress award at the 3rd Hengdian Film and TV Festival of China for her role. She was then cast as the female lead, Bi Yao, in Noble Aspirations, based on the popular novel Zhu Xian written by Xiao Ding. The drama has over 23 billion views online, the highest record held by a Chinese drama at that time. The same year, Zhao starred in her first war drama, Rookie Agent Rouge. VLinkage reported that as of December 2016, Zhao's combined dramas' views have reached over 110 billion views, which is the currently the most for a Chinese actor.

In 2017, Zhao starred in the Han Han-directed film, Duckweed, alongside Deng Chao and Eddie Peng. The sleeper hit was a commercial and critical success. She won her first film award, the Favorite Actress at the Beijing College Student Film Festival. She then starred in the revolutionary drama film Eternal Wave along with Aaron Kwok, about Communist Party (CPC) undercover agents operating against the Japanese in 1930s Shanghai. Zhao returned to the small screen with historical action drama Princess Agents, playing a slave girl who rises up to become a powerful female general. Princess Agents was a commercial success both domestically and internationally, and held the record as the most watched Chinese television series at that time. The same year, Forbes China named Zhao in their 30 Under 30 Asia list which comprises 30 influential people under 30 years old who have made substantial effect in their fields.

In 2018, Zhao starred in the fantasy adventure film The Monkey King 3, playing the role of the Women Country's Ruler. Zhao then starred in the historical drama The Story of Minglan produced by Daylight Entertainment. The drama received critical acclaim and topped television ratings with over 2% in its final episodes. Zhao was nominated at the Magnolia Award for Best Actress in a Television Series for the second time.

In 2019, it was announced that Zhao would star as the female lead in the wuxia drama Legend of Fei, based on the novel You Fei by Priest.

On February 10, 2024, the comedy drama film Article 20 featuring Zhao was released. On February 26, the 17th Asian Film Awards announced that Zhao had won the AFA New Generation Award.

== Other activities ==
In 2016, Zhao was named the tourism ambassador of Hebei. The same year, Zhao became the vice president of Yi Xia Technology.

Zhao unveiled her wax figure at Madame Tussauds Beijing in May 2017. The same year, Zhao was chosen as a brand ambassador for Dior in China.

In March 2019, Zhao announced her partnership with Hesong Media.

== Personal life ==
On October 16, 2018, Zhao announced her marriage to actor Feng Shaofeng on Sina Weibo. On March 8, 2019, Zhao gave birth to a boy.

On April 23, 2021, Feng and Zhao announced their divorce on Sina Weibo, ending their two-year marriage. They share custody of their son.

== Filmography ==
=== Film ===
Year	Title	Role	Notes	Ref.
2007	The Gold Convoyers: Peony Pavilion	Xiao Hong		
2008	The Warriors in Mashishan	Ying Zi		
2008	Love Killed Nine River Hall	You Lan		
2013	The Palace	Liu Li		
2015	Crazy New Year’s Eve	Li Nana		
2016	Royal Treasure	Princess Baihua		
2016	The Rise of a Tomboy	He Siuwu		
2016	Days of Our Own	Zhang Jingyi		
2017	Duckweed	Niu Aihua / Zhang Suzhen		
2017	Eternal Wave	He Lanfang		
2018	The Monkey King 3	Ruler of Women's Country		
2021	Raya and the Last Dragon	Raya	Voice; Mandarin dub	
2024	Article 20	Hao Xiuping		
2024	She's Got No Name	Xi Lin		
2024	Tiger Wolf Rabbit	Li Hongying		
2024	The Unseen Sister	Qiao Yan		
2025	We Girls	Gao Yuexiang		

Short film

Year	Title	Role	Ref.
2006	Gui Zu Pian	Noblewoman from Zhou clan of Runan	
2017	Who Loves You The Most		
2017	Love of Jasmine	Female lead	
2017	Wang You Jiu Guan: Xiang Si Men		
2017	Wang You Jiu Guan: Wang You Zhen	Mysterious Woman	
2018	The Real Illusion		
2018	Goodbye	Xiao Han	
2018	Bobo Snap		
2018	Wang You Jiu Guan III	Du Guxue	
2022	Hello, Hello	Lin Yin	

=== Television series ===
Year	Title	Role	Notes	Ref.
2006	Century Endless Love	Lin Shanshan		
2007	King of Nanyue Kingdom	Empress		
2007	Golden Marriage	Tong Duoduo		
2008	Spring Goes, Spring Comes	Ren Jie'er		
2009	Love Tribulations	Wen Yan		
2009	The Firmament of The Pleiades	Ling'er		
2009	A Husband and Wife	Yingzi		
2010	Qiao Luo Gang	Li Qiuping (young)		
2010	The Girl in Blue	An An		
2010	The Dream of Red Mansions	Xing Xiuyan		
2010	The Amateur Imperial Bodyguard	Chen Xin'er		
2011	Goddess of Mercy	A Jing		
2011	New My Fair Princess	Princess Qing'er		
2011	Xia Yan's Autumn	Tang Xiaoran		
2012	Best Quality Men and Women	Chu Yang		
2012	Palace II	Tunggiya Baihe	Cameo	
2012	Cuo Dian Yuan Yang	Su Huan'er / Yang Yiliu		
2013	Legend of Lu Zhen	Lu Zhen		
2013	The Legend of Chasing Fish	Hong Ling		
2013	Ex	Liu Li	Cameo	
2014	Wife's Secret	Jiang Baihe		
2014	Boss & Me	Xue Shanshan		
2014	The Romance of the Condor Heroes	Mu Nianci	Cameo	
2015	The Journey of Flower	Hua Qiangu		
2015	Best Get Going	Song Nuan		
2015	Love Yunge from the Desert	Bai He	Cameo	
2015	Legend of Zu Mountain	Yu Wuxin		
2016	Lucky Tianbao	Yang Ruonan		
2016	The Mystic Nine	Yin Xinyue		
2016	Noble Aspirations	Bi Yao	Season 1–2	
2016	Rookie Agent Rouge	Lan Yanzhi		
2016	Happy Mitan	Chong Chong	Cameo	
2017	Princess Agents	Chu Qiao		
2018	Our Glamorous Time	Lin Qian		
2018	The Story of Minglan	Sheng Minglan		
2020	Legend of Fei	Zhou Fei		
2021	Who Is The Murderer	Shen Yu		
2022	The Story of Xing Fu	Xing Fu		
2022	Wild Bloom	Xu Banxia		
2024	The Legend of Shen Li	Shen Li		
2025	What A Wonderful World	Jia Xiaoduo	Also producer	
2025	The Unclouded Soul	Dreamshard Immortal	Cameo	
2026	The Dream Maker	Li Qiuping		

=== Television shows ===
Year	Title	Role	Ref.
2015	Up Idol	Cast member	
2017	72 Floors of Mystery	Cast member	
2020	Chinese Restaurant 4	Cast member	

=== Music video appearances ===
Year	Title	Artist	Ref.
2016	"To Love You"	Kenny Kwan	
2017	"Miss You"	Kris Wu	
2021	"You Deserve Better"	Jason Zhang	

== Discography ==
=== Singles ===
Year	English title	Chinese title	Album	Notes	Ref.
2013	"Mood"	心情	Legend of Lu Zhen OST	with Chen Xiao	
2015	"Not to Mention"	不可说	The Journey of Flower OST	with Wallace Huo	
2015	"You're an Idol"	你是偶像	Up Idol theme song	with various artists	
2015	"Ten Years"	十年	Days of Our Own OST	Rendition of Eason Chan's song	
2015	"Destruction in Chaos"	乱世俱灭	Legend of Zu Mountain OST	with Andy Hui	
2015	"I Have Never Existed"	我从来不存在	Legend of Zu Mountain OST	with Yilia Yu	
2016	"Yearning"	心念	Rookie Agent Rouge OST		
2017	"Gaze"	望	Princess Agents OST	with Zhang Bichen	
2017	"Miss You"	想你	Non-album single	with Kris Wu	
2018	"Don't You Know"	知否知否	The Story of Minglan OST	with Feng Shaofeng	

== Awards and nominations ==
Major awards
Year	Award	Category	Nominated work	Result	Ref.
2013	5th China TV Drama Awards	Best New Actress	Legend of Lu Zhen	Won	
2014	10th China Golden Eagle TV Art Festival	Golden Eagle Goddess	—N/a	Won	
2014	13th Huading Awards	Best New Actress	Legend of Lu Zhen	Nominated	
2015	6th Macau International Television Festival	Best Actress	The Journey of Flower	Won	
2016	19th Huading Awards	Best Actress (Contemporary Drama)	Best Get Going	Nominated	
2016	19th Huading Awards	Best Actress (Historical Drama)	The Journey of Flower	Nominated	
2016	22nd Shanghai Television Festival	Best Actress	The Journey of Flower	Nominated	
2016	28th China TV Golden Eagle Award	Audience's Choice for Actress	The Journey of Flower	Won	
2016	11th China Golden Eagle TV Art Festival	Most Popular Actress	The Journey of Flower	Nominated	
2016	3rd Asia Rainbow TV Awards	Best Actress (Historical Drama)	The Journey of Flower	Nominated	
2016	3rd Hengdian Film and TV Festival of China	Best Actress	The Mystic Nine	Won	
2017	22nd Huading Awards	Best Actress	The Mystic Nine	Nominated	
2017	24th Beijing College Student Film Festival	Favorite Actress	Duckweed	Won	
2017	8th Macau International Television Festival	Best Actress	Princess Agents	Nominated	
2018	9th China Film Director's Guild Awards	Best Actress	Duckweed	Nominated	
2019	25th Shanghai Television Festival	Best Actress	The Story of Minglan	Nominated	
2019	26th Huading Awards	Best Actress (Historical drama)	The Story of Minglan	Nominated	
2019	Golden Bud - The Fourth Network Film And Television Festival	Best Actress	The Story of Minglan	Nominated	
2020	30th China TV Golden Eagle Award	Best Actress	The Story of Minglan	Nominated	
2020	30th China TV Golden Eagle Award	Audience's Choice for Actress	The Story of Minglan	Won	
2022	35th Huading Awards	Best Actress (Contemporary)	The Story of Xingfu	Won	
2023	28th Shanghai Television Festival	Best Actress	Wild Bloom	Nominated	
2024	37th Hundred Flowers Awards	Best Supporting Actress	Article 20	Won	
2024	34th Flying Apsaras Awards	Outstanding Actress	Wild Bloom	Won	
Others
2006	Search Star Game		—N/a	Won	
2009	Chinese Creative Short Video Awards	Most Popular Actress	—N/a	Won	
2013	Youku Young Choice Awards	Most Popular Actress (Mainland China)	Legend of Lu Zhen	Won	
2013	4th LeTV Film & TV Awards	Most Popular Actress (TV)	Legend of Lu Zhen	Won	
2014	3rd iQiyi All-Star Carnival	Most Popular Actress	Boss & Me	Won	
2014	6th China TV Drama Awards	Most Popular Actress (Mainland China)	Boss & Me	Won	
2015	Weibo Awards Ceremony	Weibo Goddess	Boss & Me	Won	
2015	4th iQiyi All-Star Carnival	Most Popular Actress	—N/a	Won	
2015	Powerstar Award Ceremony	Most Popular Actress	—N/a	Won	
2015	2nd The Actors of China Award Ceremony	Best Actress (Emerald)	The Journey of Flower	Nominated	
2015	7th China TV Drama Awards	Special Contribution Award	—N/a	Won	
2015	7th China TV Drama Awards	Actress with the Most Ratings Appeal	—N/a	Won	
2016	Weibo Awards Ceremony	Most Popular Actress	—N/a	Won	
2016	Weibo Awards Ceremony	Weibo Queen	—N/a	Won	
2016	Tencent Star App	Most Popular Actress	—N/a	Won	
2016	Chengdu Economic Daily Readers' Reputation Ranking	Television Actress of the Year	—N/a	Won	
2016	Chinese Campus Art Glory Festival	Most Popular Actress	—N/a	Won	
2016	5th iQiyi All-Star Carnival	Artist of the Year	The Mystic Nine	Won	
2016	Baidu Moments Press Conference	Most Commercially Valuable Female Artist	—N/a	Won	
2016	10th Tencent Video Star Awards	Most Popular TV Actress	Noble Aspirations	Won	
2017	2nd China Quality Television Drama Ceremony	Most Talented Actress	Rookie Agent Rouge	Won	
2017	2nd Weibo Movie Awards Ceremony	Most Anticipated Film Pairing	The Monkey King 3	Won	
2017	6th iQiyi All-Star Carnival	Goddess Award	—N/a	Won	
2017	11th Tencent Video Star Awards	Television Actress of the Year	Princess Agents	Won	
2017	24th Cosmo Beauty Ceremony	Beautiful Idol of the Year	—N/a	Won	
2018	7th iQiyi All-Star Carnival	Goddess Award	—N/a	Won	
2019	6th The Actors of China Award Ceremony	Best Actress (Emerald Category)	The Story of Minglan	Nominated	
2019	Tencent Video All Star Awards	Most Commercially Valuable Artist	—N/a	Won	
2019	Tencent Video All Star Awards	VIP Star	—N/a	Won	
2020	Weibo Awards Ceremony	Influential Actor of the Year	—N/a	Won	
2020	China Literature Awards Ceremony	Actress of the Year	—N/a	Won	
2021	Douyin Star Night	Star Goddess	—N/a	Won	
2021	Douyin Star Night	Most Popular Actor	—N/a	Won	
2023	Harper's Bazaar Annual ICONS Party	Actor of the Year	—N/a	Won	

=== Forbes China Celebrity 100 ===
Year	Rank	Ref.
2014	80th	
2015	43rd	
2017	4th	
2019	15th	
2020	7th	
2021	7th	
