= The Monkey King (2014 film) =

2014 Hong Kong-Chinese film by Soi Cheang

- Theatrical release poster

Chinese name
- Traditional Chinese: 西游記之大鬧天宮
- Simplified Chinese: 西游记之大闹天宫
Transcriptions
Standard Mandarin
- Hanyu Pinyin: Xīyóu jì zhī dà nào tiāngōng

Japanese name
- Kanji: 西への旅
Transcriptions
- Revised Hepburn: Nishi e no tabi
- Directed by: Soi Cheang
- Screenplay by: Szeto Kam-Yuen; Edmond Wong; Lola Huo; Dali Chen
- Based on: Journey to the West by Wu Cheng'en
- Produced by: Kiefer Liu
- Starring: Donnie Yen; Donald Chow; Aaron Kwok; Joe Chen; Peter Ho
- Cinematography: Cheung Man-po; Ardy Lam; Yang Tao
- Edited by: Cheung Ka-fai
- Music by: Christopher Young
- Production company: (See Notes)
- Distributed by: (See Notes) aeon pictures studios India, IDRAGON MOVIES APP
- Release dates: 25 January 2014 (Beijing premiere); 30 January 2014 (Hong Kong); 31 January 2014 (China)
- Running time: 120 minutes
- Countries: Hong Kong; China
- Language: Cantonese
- Budget: 500 million yuan (82 million USD)
- Box office: US $182.2 million

The Monkey King (also known as The Monkey King: Havoc in Heaven's Palace) is a 2014 action-fantasy film directed by Soi Cheang and starring Donnie Yen as the titular protagonist Sun Wukong. A Hong Kong-Chinese co-production, Yen also serves as the film's action director. The film co-stars Donald Chow, Aaron Kwok, Joe Chen and Peter Ho.

Production began in Beijing on 18 October 2010 and was filmed in 3D. The plot is based on an episode of Journey to the West, a 16th-century Chinese literary classic written in the Ming Dynasty by Wu Cheng'en. It was released on 31 January 2014 and received mixed reviews from critics. A sequel, The Monkey King 2, was released in February 2016.

== Plot ==
During an attack on Heaven, the Bull Demon King battles and loses against the Jade Emperor, the ruler of Heaven. The Emperor's sister and the Bull Demon King's lover, Princess Iron Fan, convinces the Emperor to spare him; the Emperor banishes him, Princess Iron Fan, and the rest of the demons to Flaming Mountain. The goddess Nüwa sacrifices her body to rebuild Heaven with crystals. The Jade Emperor appoints his nephew, Erlang Shen, to guard the Southern Gate, despite Erlang's resentment of the task. One of the crystals falls to Mount Huaguo, taking the form of a monkey over time. A nine-tailed fox is scarred after touching the crystal and is whisked away by a mysterious force.

Years later, the monkey is taken in and trained by Subhuti, naming him Sun Wukong. The Bull Demon King plans to invade Heaven again by using Wukong and preying on Erlang's anger toward the Jade Emperor. Erlang agrees to help the Demon King in exchange for the chance to kill his uncle and take Heaven's throne. The plan is kept secret from Princess Iron Fan, who is pregnant with the Demon King's child. Wukong travels to the palace of the Dragon King to find weapons for the Mount Huaguo monkeys. After defeating the Dragon King, Wukong becomes intrigued by a staff planted in the sea. He removes it, causing a violent storm. The Bull Demon King asks a young Vixen if she would like to meet her old friend again. She is revealed to be the nine-tailed fox, and the Demon King is revealed as the force that whisked her away, claiming to have saved her life. After the Dragon King informs Heaven of Wukong's destruction, Erlang sends Nezha to arrest him.

The Vixen, who reveals her name to be Ruxue, reunites with her old friend, Wukong. He promises to make her immortal after learning she will die when she turns 200 years old. The pair is attacked by Nezha, who is then killed by the Bull Demon King. Wukong befriends the Demon King, who appeals to Wukong's ego and tempts him with Heaven's treasures, including immortality. Wukong journeys to Heaven and learns the secret to immortality. The Demon King and Erlang conspire further, revealing that if Wukong consumes the Emperor's elixir, it will increase his power.

Erlang tries to convince the Jade Emperor that Wukong is a demon, but Subhuti intervenes, explaining that Wukong is not evil. Wukong meets the Emperor and is given a position caring for the stables. Princess Iron Fan learns of the Demon King's plan; he justifies his attack as destiny. Wukong comes across a large kiln. Erlang, disguised as a maiden, tempts him by revealing that the Emperor's elixir is made there. Wukong is restrained by Subhuti and told to leave, but Erlang challenges him to take the elixir. Wukong consumes the elixir and battles Erlang until the latter flees. Ashamed, Wukong leaves Heaven and returns to find Mount Huaguo destroyed and all his friends dead, including Ruxue, who has a dark substance around her neck. Enraged, Wukong returns to Heaven after the Bull Demon King convinces him that the gods were responsible. Wukong attacks Heaven's armies and the Emperor. Subhuti battles the Demon King but is defeated. Wukong notices the Demon King conjure the same dark substance he found on Ruxue and realizes the Demon King was who killed Wukong's friends. Wukong attacks the Demon King but is defeated.

Through a vision, the Bodhisattva Guan Yin helps Wukong realize his mistakes. The Demon King defeats the Emperor and kills Erlang, taking the throne. Wukong battles the Demon King once more, sending him crashing to Earth. Later, Princess Iron Fan gives birth to Red Boy. They find the Bull Demon King who, having lost all his power, has been turned into a regular bull. Iron Fan explains that this is the fate of evil men, but she continues to care for the bull regardless. Wukong wishes to help the Emperor rebuild Heaven, but he is stopped by Buddha. Buddha reveals that Wukong's chance for atonement will arrive in 500 years, but he must sleep inside Buddha's hand-turned-mountain until then. Wukong agrees and is sealed by Buddha. 500 years later, the Buddhist monk Tang Sanzang approaches the mountain.

== Cast ==
- Donnie Yen as Sun Wukong, the Monkey King
- Chow Yun-fat as the Jade Emperor
- Aaron Kwok as Bull Demon King
- Joe Chen as Princess Iron Fan
- Peter Ho as Erlang Shen
- Kelly Chen as Guan Yin
- Zhang Zilin as Nüwa
- Gigi Leung as Chang'e
- Xia Zitong as Ruxue the Nine-tailed Vixen
- Louis Fan as Juling Shen
- Eddie Cheung as Li Jing, the Pagoda-wielding Heavenly King
- Calvin Cheng as Nezha
- Him Law as Muzha
- Liu Hua as the Dragon King of the East Sea
- Li Ching as the Green-haired Monkey King
- Irene Wang as Fairy Caiyun
- Hai Yitian as Puti Zushi
- Cathy Leung as Fairy Caixia
- Monica Mok
- Liu Ye
- Wang Xizhi

== Production ==
In 2010, when the film was first announced, both Jet Li and Donnie Yen were eyed for a role. Yen was cast to play the title role of the Monkey King that May. Later, Chow Yun-fat and Aaron Kwok were cast as the Jade Emperor and Bull Demon King respectively. Kwok's role was said to be breaking traditions for being handsome, stylish and fighting for love. The film was originally budgeted at 300 million yuan but later was raised to 400 million. Production companies were: Filmko Entertainment, Mandarin Films, China Film Co., Ltd., Shenzhen Golden Shores Films, Zhejiang HG Entertainment, Dongguan Boning Entreprise and Investment, included Beijing Wen Hua Dong Run Investment Co., Ltd., China Film Co-Production Corporation, and Global Star Productions, Inc. Michael Wehrhahn, President of Global Star Production, Inc, joined with former Imagine Films / Universal Television president Robert Harris in producing and releasing high end features for the US and Asian markets. Distributors were: Filmko Entertainment (Hong Kong; International), Aeon Pix Studios, Newport Entertainment (Hong Kong), Beijing Anshi Naying Culture Co. (China), China Film Co., Ltd. (China), Wanda Media (China), and Global Star Productions.

Additional cast members included Cecilia Cheung, Gigi Leung, Kelly Chen, Peter Ho, Joe Chen and Liu Ye. Zhang Zilin, winner of Miss World 2007, joined to the film, playing the role of Nüwa, replacing Cecilia Cheung, who was originally cast in the role. Zhang claimed that she never heard that Cheung was to be in the film.

For the 3-D shoot, Filmko recruited Hollywood talents. The crew includes David Ebner (Alice in Wonderland, Spider-Man 3), who served as visual effects supervisor for the film and Shaun Smith (The Forbidden Kingdom, 300, I Am Legend) as the special make-up supervisor.

In a 2013 interview with asianmoviepulse.com, Michael Wehrhahn explained that two versions of the film were being produced, saying, "The First [sic] China Version [sic] is in Mandarin keeping authentic to Chinese culture and Chinese style of film making [sic]. The second version or what we call the international US version is in English with a special guest well known [sic] US Celebrity [sic] appearing with extra characters and more scenes and special effects to market it on a broader market that's not is [sic] as aware as china [sic] of the story therefore introducing it to the US Markets. [sic]"

== Release ==
The original poster had a release date of February 2012, but the film was postponed. After several delays, the film was finally released on 30 January 2014 in Hong Kong and 31 January in China. It was released in the United States in 2015.

== The Monkey King: The Legend Begins ==
A streamlined American English dub of the film running only 90 minutes was released under the title The Monkey King: The Legend Begins in 2022.

== Reception ==
James Marsh of ScreenAnarchy referred to it as a "Hot Mess From The Heavens", saying it has poor CGI effects and a weak script, while praising lead actor Donnie Yen's performance as Sun Wukong, but ultimately writing Wukong as "a somewhat irritating character who can be difficult to sympathise with". Maggie Lee of Variety called it "a simplistic, action-driven narrative with inexhaustible energy, but little style or substance". Clarence Tsui of The Hollywood Reporter wrote, "The Monkey King is filled to the brim with gravity-defying saints and sprites zipping across the screen in a litany of kinetic 3-D action sequences. But the stellar imagery hardly makes up for the film's underwritten narrative, half-baked characterizations and emotional gimmicks".

=== Box office ===
The film had the highest-grossing opening day in China with RMB121 million (US$20.0 million), surpassing Iron Man 3. It also broke three more records in China including the highest single-day box office, the first Chinese film to break RMB100 million on its first day and the fastest Chinese film to reach RMB100 million. During its opening, it was the highest-grossing film at the global box office grossing RMB216 million (US$35.4 million). It grossed RMB389.97 million (US$64.35 million) in the first four days. With this, the film also set the record as the fastest film to reach RMB300 million in China box office. In China, The Monkey King grossed a total of RMB1,028,688,003 (US$167,840,000) and becoming only the third Chinese film to earn more than a billion yuan at the Chinese box office. The film grossed over US$182.2 million worldwide.

== Sequel ==
A sequel, The Monkey King 2, was released in 2016.
