= Xiaoshenyang =

Chinese actor

- Born: Shen He; May 7, 1981 (age 45); Kaiyuan, Tieling, Liaoning, China
- Occupations: Actor, singer, errenzhuan performer
- Years active: 2006-present
- Spouse: Shen Chunyang (m. 2004)
- Children: daughter: NINA (Shen Jiarun)

Chinese name
- Traditional Chinese: 小沈陽
- Simplified Chinese: 小沈阳
Transcriptions
Standard Mandarin
- Hanyu Pinyin: Xiǎoshěnyáng

Real name
- Traditional Chinese: 沈鶴
- Simplified Chinese: 沈鹤
Transcriptions
Standard Mandarin
- Hanyu Pinyin: Shěn Hè

Shen He (Chinese: 沈鹤; born 7 May 1981), better known by his stage name Xiaoshenyang (Chinese: 小沈阳; lit. 'Little Shenyang'), is a Chinese comedian. He rose to overnight fame in China for a comedy sketch with his mentor Zhao Benshan at the 2009 CCTV New Year's Gala, returning to the program for the next three years. He has appeared in Zhao's television series Rural Love 2 and Rural Love Stories, as well as Zhang Yimou's film A Simple Noodle Story.

== Filmography ==
- 2023, Ride On
- 2018, Airpocalypse
- 2018, The Monkey King 3
- 2018-12-29, Mad Ebriety (The Morning After) (断片之险途夺宝)
- 2018-06-15, The Way of the Bug
- 2016-12-30, Some Like It Hot
- 2016-02-08, The Monkey King 2
- 2016-02-01, The New Year's Eve of Old Lee
- 2015-12-31, Detective Chinatown
- 2015-12-04, Impossible
- 2015-07-17, Jian Bing Man (guest star)
- 2015-03-05 The Right Mistake
- 2014,Houseful of Elders (unaired)
- 2014-08-08, TV series Harvest Season (guest star)
- 2014-02-28, TV series War Veteran
- 2014-02-03, TV series Rural Love Waltz (guest star)
- 2012, TV series Time to Love (unaired)
- 2013-09-15, TV series Who's the True Hero
- 2013-07-11, TV series One Who Tell Tales
- 2013-03-02, TV series As The Cherry Turns Red
- 2013-01-08, The Grandmaster (guest star)
- 2013-01-07, TV series Rural Love Partita (guest star)
- 2012-10-16, TV series The Cook Kitchen
- 2012-10-15, TV series It's Not the Problem With Money
- 2012-08-17, The Lion Roars 2
- 2012-02-19, TV series Cherry (guest star)
- 2012-02-12, TV series The Warring State's Soldier
- 2012-01-27, TV series Rural Love Serenade (guest star)
- 2012-01-16, TV series Strange Paladin OuYangDe
- 2011-05-05, TV series Rural Love Symphony (guest star)
- 2011-01-27, TV series All Who Come Are Welcomed
- 2010-12-03, Just Call Me Nobody
- 2010-02-16, TV series Rural Love III (guest star)
- 2009-12-10, A Simple Noodle Story
- 2009-01-30, TV series Mr.Guandong (guest star)
- 2008-02-10, TV series Rural Love II (guest star)

== Television programs ==
- 2008-08-01/2008-08-02, A Date With Luyu (鲁豫有约)
- 2008, Joyful Assembly (快乐集结号)
- 2008, Super Competition (超级竞杠锤)
- 2009-02-14, Superstars Get Involved (明星转起来)
- 2009-02-18, 2009-02-09, Real Stories (非常故事会)
- 2009-03-16/03-17/03-18/03-19, Yird (人间)
- 2009-04-03, The Same Song (同一首歌)
- 2009-07-25, Superstars Get Involved (明星转起来)
- 2009-10-11, Joyous China (欢乐中国行)
- 2009-10-16, The Same Song (同一首歌)
- 2009-11-21, Star Boulevard (星光大道)
- 2009-12-03, Real Stories (非常故事会)
- 2009-12-10, Five Star Talk (五星夜话)
- 2009-12-14/12-15/12-16/12-17, Love Film (爱电影)
- 2009-12-20, Kefan's Hearken (可凡倾听)
- 2009-12-21/12-22/12-23/12-24/12-25/12-26, Benshan Happy Camp (本山快乐营)
- 2009-12-24, Dance Assembly (舞林大会)
- 2009-12-27, Chenchen All Stars (陈辰全明星)
- 2010-01-02, Superstars Get Involved(明星转起来)
- 2010-01-03, Kevin Listens (可凡倾听)
- 2010-02-01, Proud of China (真情耀中华)
- 2010-02-28, Happiness Lasts (久久合家欢)
- 2010-03-13, Superstars Get Involved (明星转起来)
- 2010-03-21, Joyous China (欢乐中国行)
- 2010-04-03, Superstars Get Involved (明星转起来)
- 2010-04-24, Variety Big Brother (综艺大哥大)
- 2010-04-30, Kangxi Lai Le (康熙来了)
- 2010-05-05, Super Ace (王牌大明星)
- 2010-05-07, Kangxi Lai Le (康熙来了)
- 2010-05-07, The Chinese Passion (中华情)
- 2010-09-16, We Have Our Way (我们有一套)
- 2010-09-21, Benshan Happy Camp (本山快乐营)
- 2010-11-26, Benshan Happy Camp (本山快乐营)
- 2010-11-27, Star Boulevard (星光大道)
- 2010-11-27, Benshan Happy Camp (本山快乐营)
- 2010-11-27, Happy Camp (快乐大本营)
- 2010-12-04, Superstars Get Involved(明星转起来)
- 2011-02-13, Comedy World(喜剧世界)
- 2011-02-15, Xiao Cui Talk Show (小崔说事)
- 2012-02-13, Superstar Is Coming (大驾光临)
- 2012-02-04, Happy Camp (快乐大本营)
- 2012-02-05, Star Boulevard (星光大道)
- 2012-03-01, Take A Risk (纵横四海)
- 2012-03-03, Happy Camp (快乐大本营)
- 2012-03-08, Take A Risk (纵横四海)
- 2012-08-15, Close Meeting (非常静距离)
- 2012-10-12, Legend of Songs (歌声传奇)
- 2013-02-11, Good Show (郭的秀)
- 2013-06-21, Copycat Singers (天下无双)
- 2013-07-29, Super Talk Show (超级访问)
- 2013-08-02, To Be In Rural Love VII(我要上乡七)
- 2013-09-06, Bigstar (最佳现场)
- 2013-09-07, Duets (最美和声)
- 2013-09-25, Film Flow (影视风云)
- 2013-09-28, Close Meeting (非常静距离)
- 2013-12-18/12-19, Who Will Benshan Choose (本山选谁上春晚)
- 2014-01-08/01-09, Who Will Benshan Choose (本山选谁上春晚)
- 2014-01-11~2014-03-29, The First Time with Shen Chunyang and Shen Jiarun (人生第一次)
- 2014-01-27/02-17/02-24, Door to Fortune (开门大吉)
- 2014-02-25, The Real Is Not False (真的假不了)
- 2014-05-17~2014-08-02, Mad For Music (我为歌狂)
- 2014-06-09, Laugh Out Loud (我们都爱笑)
- 2014-08-08, Beijing Shows (大戏看北京)
- 2014-10-09, Laugh With Celebs (明星同乐会)
- 2015-04-25/05-02/05-30, Joyful Comedians (欢乐喜剧人)
- 2015-06-18, 尖叫吧路人
