= Jackie Chan Action Movie Awards =

Chinese film award

Jackie Chan Action Movie Awards are awards presented to action film genre. The "Jackie Chan Action Movie Week" was originally presented during the Shanghai International Film Festival since 2015, but in 2019 it moved to a new date and venue in Shanghai to become its own event. Voted by the reporters in the entertainment industry, the awards are aimed at "celebrating international action movies and honoring those who have made outstanding contributions to the genre". The award ceremony is named after Hong Kong action star Jackie Chan.

Held in a full-sized sports arena, notable attendees at the inaugural solo event in 2019 included Chris Tucker, Adrien Brody and Paul Haggis. Variety declared that the "scale (of the stunt-filled closing ceremony) suggested ambitions of matching an Olympic Games or World Cup ceremony."

In 2021, instead of the regular awards, the best ten Chinese action movies were selected.

== Awards ==
=== Best Action Movie ===
Year	Film	Country
2015	Wolf Warriors	China
2016	Ip Man 3	Hong Kong
2017	Sultan	India
2018	Operation Red Sea	China
2019	The Big Shot	China
2026	The Furious	China
2026	Major Grom: The Game	Russia

=== Best Action Movie Director ===
Year	Film	Winner	Country
2015	Chocolate	Panna Rittikrai	Thailand
2016	Ip Man 3	Wilson Yip	Hong Kong
2017	Operation Mekong	Lin Chaoxian	China
2018	Wolf Warrior 2	Wu Jing	China
2019	Shadows and Echoes	He Quan	China
2026	The Shadow's Edge	Larry Yang	China

=== Best Action Choreographer ===
Year	Film	Winner	Country
2015	Tom Yum Goong 2		Thailand
2016	Point Break	Jon DeVore	United States
2017	Extraordinary Mission	Li Zhongzhi	China
2018	Detective Chinatown 2	Wu Gang	China
2019	Junglee	Li Zhongzhi	India
2026	The Shadow's Edge	Hang Su	China

=== Best Action Movie Actor ===
Year	Film	Winner	Country
2015	Wolf Warriors	Wu Jing	China
2016	No Escape	Owen Wilson	United States
2017	Boyka: Undisputed	Scott Adkins	United States
2018	Wolf Warrior 2	Wu Jing	China
2019	The Big Shot	Wang Qianyuan	China
2026	The Furious	Miao Xie	China

=== Best Action Movie Actress ===
Year	Film	Winner	Country
2015	Dragon Blade	Lin Peng	China
2016	For a Few Bullets	Zhang Jingchu	China
2017	Fatal Countdown: Reset	Yang Mi	China
2018	Dangal	Fatima Sana Shaikh	India
2018	Operation Red Sea	Jiang Luxia	China
2019	Thugs of Hindostan	Fatima Sana Shaikh	India
2026	Blades of the Guardians: Wind Rises in the Desert	Chen Lijun	China

=== Best New Action Performer ===
Year	Film	Winner	Country
2015	Kung Fu Jungle	Wang Baoqiang (as Best New Actor)	China
2015	The Raid 2	Julie Estelle (as Best New Actress)	Indonesia
2016	Chasing	Han Sang-hyuk	South Korea
2017	Extraordinary Mission	Huang Xuan	China
2018	Dangal	Sanya Malhotra	India
2026	The Shadow's Edge	Lin Chaney (as Best New Action Actor)	China
2026	The Furious	Yang Enyou (as Best New Action Actress)	China
2026	Kung Fu Soccer	Xue Ye (as Most Promising Action Performer)	China

=== Best Special Effects ===
Year	Film	Winner	Country
2015	Wolf Warriors		China
2016	Point Break	Jeb Corliss	United States
2017	Extraordinary Mission		China
2018	Operation Red Sea		China

=== Best Fight ===
Year	Film	Country
2015	Wolf Warriors	China
2016	Ip Man 3	Hong Kong
2017	Boyka: Undisputed	United States
2018	Chasing the Dragon	Hong Kong

=== Best Action Stuntman ===
Year	Film	Winner	Country
2018	Detective Chinatown 2	Long Cuilong	China

=== Best Action Stuntwoman ===
Year	Film	Winner	Country
2018	Brotherhood of Blades 2	Chen Jiaojiao	China

=== Lifetime Achievement ===
Year	Film	Country
2018	Sammo Hung	Hong Kong
2019	Yuen Woo Ping	Hong Kong
2026	Ti Lung	Hong Kong

=== Best Screenplay ===
Year	Film	Winner	Country
2019	Shadows and Echoes	Zhang Liangxue	China
2026	Major Grom: The Game	Artyom Gabrelyanov and Nikolai Shishkin	Russia

=== Best Art Design ===
Year	Film	Winner	Country
2019	Project Gutenberg	Lin Ziqao	Hong Kong, China
2026	The Legend of Maula Jatt	Namsa Abbasi and Hamza Bajwa (as Best Art Direction)	Pakistan

=== Best Photography ===
Year	Film	Winner	Country
2019	Project Gutenberg	Guan Zhiyao	Hong Kong, China
2026	Operation Hadal	Peter Pau (as Best Cinematography)	China

=== Best Edition ===
Year	Film	Winner	Country
2019	T-34	Dmitry Korabelnikov	Russia
2026	Major Grom: The Game	Dmitry Korabelnikov (as Best Film Editing)	Russia

=== Special Mention ===
Year	Film	Country
2019	T-34	Russia
2019	Junglee	India
2026	The Legend of Maula Jatt (as Special Jury Award)	Pakistan
2026	Racketeer 3 (as Special Jury Award)	Kazakhstan
2026	Operation Hadal (as Organizing Committee Special Honor)	China

=== Best stuntss ===
Year	Film	Country
2026	Operation Hadal	China

=== 2021: Best Chinese action movies ===
==== Winners ====
- Once Upon a Time in China II (1992)
- Shaolin Temple (1982)
- The Final Master (2015)
- Crouching Tiger, Hidden Dragon (2000)
- A Touch of Zen (1970)
- New Dragon Gate Inn (1992)
- The Grandmaster (2013)
- Hero (2002)
- A Better Tomorrow (1986)
- Wolf Warrior 2 (2017)

==== Honorable mentions ====
- Drunken Master (1978)
- Police Story (1985)
- The Battle at Lake Changjin (2021)
- The Way of the Dragon (1972)
