= École normale israélite orientale (Paris) =

École normale israélite orientale (ENIO)

Location
- 6 Bis Rue Michel-Ange; 16th arrondissement of Paris; France; 48°50′50″N 2°15′48″E

Information
- Type: Private
- Religious affiliation: Judaism
- Established: 1865 (classes began 1867)
- Founder: The six founding members of the Alliance Israélite Universelle
- School board: La Fondation ENIO (established 1880)
- Authority: Ministry of National Education
- Campus size: 2
- Campus type: Multi-campus
- Website: https://www.aiu.org/fr/le-groupe-alliance

L'École normale israélite orientale (ENIO) was founded by the Alliance Israélite Universelle (AIU) in 1865 in Paris and continues its activities today. Originally established as a teacher-training seminary to train educators for the AIU's global network of Jewish schools, the ENIO has since transitioned into a broader administrative and educational foundation (La Fondation ENIO). Today, the main campus in the 16th arrondissement of Paris holds the Centre Alliance Edmond J. Safra (CAEJS) and the Gustave Leven Primary School, while its secondary education branch operates off-site as the Collège-Lycée Alliance Georges Leven in the 12th arrondissement of Paris.

== History ==
=== Founding ===
The École normale israélite orientale was established in 1865 by the AIU to address a shortage of qualified educators for its expanding global network of schools. The six founding members of the AIU and the ENIO:

- Aristide Astruc (Note: French Rabbi who became Assistant Rabbi to the Chief Rabbi of Paris, and himself the Grand Rabbi of Belgium from 1866-1879)
- Isidore Cahen (Note: Alumnus, École normale supérieure (Paris) & professor at the Israelite Seminary of France)
- Jules Carvallo (Note: bridges & roads engineer who trained at France's École polytechnique)
- Narcisse Leven (Note: Lawyer at the Imperial Court of Paris, future president of the AIU)
- Eugène Manuel (Note: Alumnus, ENS (Paris) and professor)
- Charles Netter (Note: Merchant, member of the committee of the Organization for the Patronage of Jewish Apprentices in Paris)

=== Timeline ===
Year	Event
1860	Founding of the Alliance Israélite Universelle (AIU)
1862	The first primary school is established in Tétouan by the partnership between the AIU and a Jewish organization based in London.
1865-1867	The ENIO is established in 1865 for the training of teachers and in 1867 opens its doors for its first cohort of male students in Paris.
1877	Maurice Marx becomes Director of the ENIO.
1880	12 February 1880: The Fondation ENIO is established, public utility status granted & the first articles of statutes declared: 1) to receive the best students (male & female) from Jewish schools; 2) to advance proficiency in the French & Oriental languages; 3) to train students to teach primary eudcation & supervise Jewish vocational and agricultural training.
1897-1911	Israel Danon serves as director of the ENIO.
1913-1932	Albert Haim Navon serves as director of the ENIO.
1914-1918	World War I and the collapse of the Ottoman Empire cause the closure of many AIU institutions, though enrollment numbers remain relatively stable thanks in part to the many schools in Morocco.
1947-1961	Emmanuel Levinas becomes director of the ENIO. He serves as director for about 35 years, albeit after 1961 in an emeritus capacity.
1997	École Georges Leven (a middle school) is installed on the main site and expands into a high school as well.
2010-2012	Alliance Europe Project initiated to expand across Europe
2011-2015	The AIU and the Edmond J. Safra Philanthropic Foundation develop the Centre Alliance Edmond J. Safra on the Rue Michel Ange site of the main campus. This new facility includes a primary school (École élémentaire Alliance Gustave Leven), a research institute incorporating the AIU's vast library & archives, and a renovated synagogue/auditorium. The Collège/Lycée Alliance Georges Leven moves to the other campus at 30 boulevard Carnot 75012 Paris.

== Enrollment ==
Students are provided with room, board, clothing, and instruction, and compensated for travel expenses from their home locations to the school. In 1960, a new boarding facility, located near the school, was acquired for female students. The school year 1959-1960 had 62 students enrolled. Prior to 1960, and since 1872, female students boarded at the Paris branch of the École/Institut Bischoffsheim, an offshoot of the Brussels school of the same name founded by Jonathan-Raphaël Bischoffsheim, whose brother Louis-Raphaël founded the Paris branch.

== Directors ==
- Maurice Marx (1877–1897)
- Israel Danon (1897–1911)
- Albert Haim Navon (1913–1932)
- Emmanuel Levinas (active 1947–1961, emertius until full retirement)

== Alumni ==
- Ariel Wizman
- Jacques Essebag (best known as Arthur)
- Richard Orlinski
- Nathan Devers

== See also ==
- Abraham Danon – a 19th-century professor of Hebrew at the École normale israélite orientale
