= Charles Duval =

French architect (1800–1870)

Charles Auguste Duval (5 June 1800, in Beauvais – 13 September 1870, in Granville) was a French architect, best remembered for constructing the Théâtre Libre and the Bataclan theatres in Paris.

== Biography ==
Born on 16 Prairial, Year VIII (June 5, 1800), he was the son of Pierre Joseph Duval (1766–1831), the city architect of Beauvais, and Louise Victoire Geneviève Cuvelier. A student of his father (he reportedly wanted to be an actor), he would follow in his father’s footsteps and become an architect and surveyor.

He married Marie Françoise Célestine Vacquerie on July 11, 1824, in Beauvais; she was born on 5 Floréal, Year XI (April 25, 1803) in Beauvais.

In Paris, he built several mansions, including the Grand-Café Parisien on Boulevard Saint-Martin in 1857—which was then the largest café in the world—the Alcazar d'hiver, the Théâtre Libre (performing arts center) in 1858, the Casino Cadet in 1859, and the Bataclan (theatre) in 1864.

He also built the Château de la Jonchère near Brie-Comte-Robert and numerous buildings and villas in Maisons-Laffitte.

Since his work often revolves around exotic themes (Moorish, Chinese, etc.), his style can be described as Eclecticism in architecture.

Several of its buildings are designated as Monument historique.

He should not be confused with the architect of the same name, Charles Duval (1873–1937), who designed numerous buildings, including the Arès sanatorium in the northern Arcachon Bay in the Gironde department.
