= Guo Qilin =

Chinese actor (born 1996)

- 郭麒麟
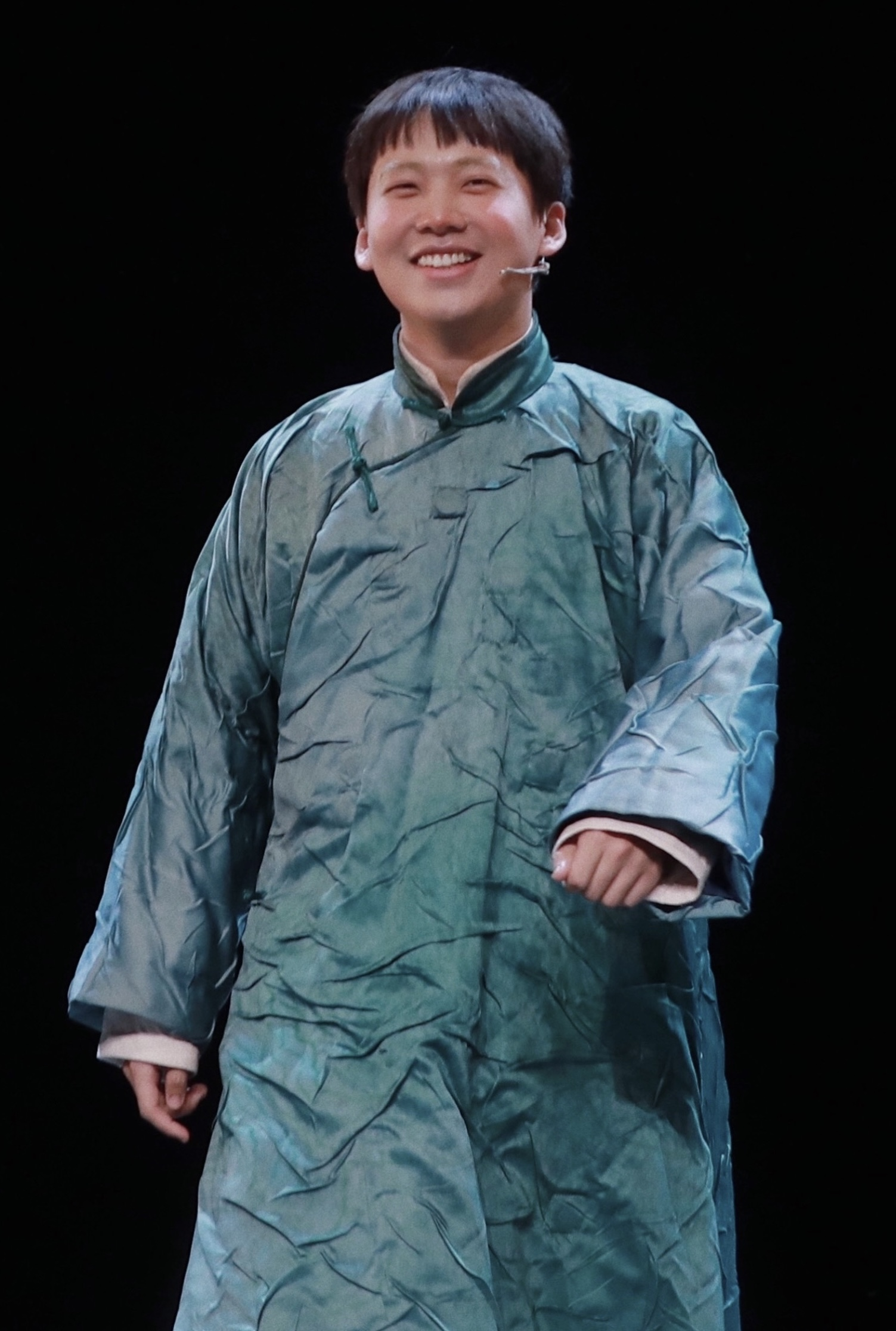
- Guo Qilin on the stage of The Story of Niu Tianci in 2021
- Born: February 8, 1996 (age 30); Tianjin, China
- Occupations: Actor, comedian

Guo Qilin (Chinese: 郭麒麟; born February 8, 1996) is a Chinese actor and xiangsheng performer. He is known for his appearances in Deyunshe xiangsheng performances and his role in the historical series My Heroic Husband (2021).

== Early life ==
Guo was born in Tianjin, China. His father is crosstalk comedian Guo Degang, the owner of performance art group Deyunshe (德云社). His teacher is Yu Qian (于谦), and his crosstalk partner is Yan Hexiang (阎鹤祥). Guo has been fond of xiangshang and Peking opera since he was around three years old, and he was able to tell stories in the crosstalk form since he was five. He joined his father's performance group with hopes of revitalizing the art form.

== Career ==
=== Xiangsheng in Deyunshe ===
In 2011, Guo quit school and began performing as a xiangsheng performer in Deyun Team 4 (德云四队). In 2012, he held a personal special performance at the Beijing Exhibition Center. He performed his own crosstalk "My Student Days".

=== Film career ===
He expanded his career in both film and television. In 2015, Guo was the lead actor in the film Our Happiness directed by his father Guo Degang. It was his first appearance on the big screen. In 2017, he starred in his first web drama "The Big Forest".

He was one of the lead actors in the film Adoring (2019). His natural performance boosted his reputation in the Chinese film industry, with many starting to pay attention to him as a professional actor instead of a simple comedian. Guo further appeared in two films with excellent casts and production teams. The first, World's Greatest Dad (2022), starred Yu Hewei and Ni Hongjie; the second one, Ride On (2023), starred Jackie Chan and Liu Haocun. These collaborations helped Guo build a solid position in the entertainment industry.

=== Television career ===
In 2021, Guo played the lead role in My Heroic Husband alongside Song Yi, and his performance received positive feedback. The popularity of the series reached 10,000 points in iQIYI, breaking records on the streaming platform.

=== Stage career ===
Guo made his stage debut in 2019 with the role of Niu Tianci in The Story of Niu Tianci and won the New Actor of the Year in the 2021 One Drama Awards for the work.

In 2019, he participated in the costume drama "Joy of life" and was loved by the audience for his role as Fan Sizhe.

On February 14, 2021, the commercial costume drama "The Son-in-Law" starring him and Song Yi was broadcast on iQiyi. On May 22, the show "Fifty Kilometers Taohuawu-Beijing" was broadcast.

On February 2, 2022, attend the "Chinese Dream, My Dream-2022 China Internet Audiovisual Annual Ceremony".

On May 16, 2024, the TV series "Joy of Life 2" in which he participated was broadcast, and he continued to play the role of Fan Sizhe in the play.

== Filmography ==
Films
Name	Character	Year
Our Happiness (相声大电影之我要幸福)	Feng Qiancheng (冯前程)	2017
The Faces of My Gene (祖宗十九代)	Wang Baobao (王宝宝)	2018
Liberation (解放·终局营救)	Liao Feng (廖枫)	2019
Adoring (宠爱)	Ade (阿德)	2019
World's Greatest Dad (二手杰作)	Ma Mo (马墨)	2022
Ride On (龙马精神)	Lu Naihua (卢乃华)	2023

TV Series
Name	Character	Year
Big Forest Cafe (林子大了)	Guo Dalin (郭大林)	2017
Give Me a Chick at 18 (给我一个十八岁)	Qiu Shui (秋水)	2018
Joy of Life (庆余年)	Fan Sizhe (范思辙)	2019
My Heroic Husband (赘婿)	Ning Yi (宁毅)	2021

Voice
Name	Character	Release date
Rock Dog (摇滚藏獒)	Bodi (波弟)	2016
Onward (二分之一的魔法)	Ian (伊恩)	2020
Peter Rabbit 2: The Runaway (比得兔2)	Peter (比得兔)	2021

Drama
Name	Character
The Story of Niu Tianci (牛天赐)	Niu Tianci (牛天赐)

== Awards ==
Awards
Award	Year	Category	Recipient and Nominee	Result
Forbes China	2019	30 under 30	Guo Qilin	selected
The 8th Vancouver Chinese Film Festival	2020	The Most Popular Actor	Guo Qilin	win
Forbes China	2020	Celebrity 100	Guo Qilin	selected
The 16th Chinese American Film Festival	2020	New Actor of the Year	Guo Qilin	win
The 32nd Huading Award	2021	Best Actor in a TV Series on Chinese Costume Theme	My Heroic Husband	nominated
One Drama Awards	2021	New Actor of the Year	The Story of Niu Tianci	win
The 13th Macau International Movie Festival	2021	Best Television Actor	My Heroic Husband	win

== Philanthropy ==
On July 21, 2021, Guo donated 1 million yuan to the Red Cross Society of Zhengzhou towards the flooding disaster.

== Personal life ==
Guo Qilin's original name is Guo Qilin (郭奇林), and Guo Qilin (郭麒麟) is his stage name. His grandfather is Guo Youyuan, who was a policeman, and his grandmother is Guo Yuzhen, who was a primary school teacher.
