= GPFC =

GPFC may refer to:

- Glasgow Perthshire F.C., a Scottish football club
- Golden Point Football Club, an Australian rules football club
- Grand Popo Football Club, a French electronic music group
