= The Shadow's Edge =

2025 Chinese-Hong Kong film by Larry Yang

- Theatrical release poster
- Traditional Chinese: 捕風追影
- Simplified Chinese: 捕风追影
- Hanyu Pinyin: Bǔfēng zhuīyǐng
- Jyutping: Bou^{2} Fung^{3} Zeoi^{1} Jing^{2}
- Directed by: Larry Yang
- Written by: Larry Yang
- Based on: Eye in the Sky by Yau Nai-hoi
- Produced by: Victoria Hon; Zhang Chao
- Starring: Jackie Chan; Zhang Zifeng; Tony Leung Ka-fai; Ci Sha
- Cinematography: Qian Tiantian
- Edited by: Zhang Yibo
- Music by: Nicolas Errèra
- Production companies: Hairun Pictures iQIYI Pictures
- Distributed by: Tao Piao Piao (China); Edko Films (Hong Kong)
- Release dates: 3 August 2025 (Emperor Cinemas); 16 August 2025 (China); 11 September 2025 (Hong Kong)
- Running time: 142 minutes
- Countries: China; Hong Kong
- Language: Mandarin
- Box office: US$159.2 million

The Shadow's Edge (simplified Chinese: 捕风追影; traditional Chinese: 捕風追影) is a 2025 action thriller film directed and written by Larry Yang. A Chinese-Hong Kong co-production, the film is loosely adapted from the Hong Kong action thriller Eye in the Sky (2007) by Yau Nai-hoi. It stars Jackie Chan as a retired surveillance expert who returns to investigate a series of heists orchestrated by a long-time fugitive played by Tony Leung Ka-fai, and in turn he is joined by a rookie policewoman played by Zhang Zifeng. The cast also includes Ci Sha and Wen Junhui.

The film entered pre-production in 2023 and marks the second collaboration between Larry Yang and Jackie Chan after Ride On (2023). Principal photography began in October 2024, primarily in Macau, and wrapped in January 2025. Post-production continued until mid-2025, featuring a score composed by French musician Nicolas Errèra.

The film had its world premiere at Emperor Cinemas, Taikoo Li Sanlitun, Beijing on 3 August 2025, followed by theatrical releases in China on 16 August and in Hong Kong on 11 September. It received generally positive reviews from critics and earned four nominations in the 44th Hong Kong Film Awards, with Tony Leung Ka-fai winning Best Actor.

== Plot ==
The Judiciary Police, led by Wang Xuemei, have been hot on the trail of a heist crew led by longtime fugitive known as "The Shadow", ultimately identified as former intelligence officer Fu Lang-seng, which includes his six adoptive sons. The crew, featuring ringleader Xi Wang, Wang's twin brother and hacker Xi Meng, and muscle Hu Feng, breaks into a bank vault to steal a notebook and escape undetected by hacking the surveillance system. The police discover that the vault belongs to a wealthy businessman and learn the notebook contains an encryption key to his cryptocurrency wallet. They deduce that the crew will target a digital asset management company at Macau Tower. As the heist crew infiltrates the Tower, they find an unexpected HK$1.5 billion worth of cryptocurrency in the same virtual vault. They steal the currency despite Fu's objections, which allows police to arrive and force them to parachute into Wynn Macau. When the crew is cornered, Fu enters the hotel to provide cover. A barista in the Tower inadvertently captures Fu's image when taking a picture of the commotion.

With no leads following the nearly flawless heist, Wang decides to enlist retired surveillance expert Wong Tak-chong for help. Wong, skeptical of modern technology, prefers old-school methods and assembles a surveillance team, including He Qiuguo, whom he believes can approach Fu unnoticed. With Wong's guidance, the police quickly identify the disguised crew members through surveillance footage and connect Fu to a series of heists he committed twenty years earlier. Initially, He is cold towards Wong, revealing that her father died during an operation involving Wong, whom she blames for his death. However, during a night watch, she risks breaking her cover to protect a woman from thugs and is nearly hurt, only to be saved by Wong. Wong reveals that her father was killed after Wong also broke cover to act heroically, and the two reconcile.

Meanwhile, Fu is enraged by his sons' disobedience and punishes them, causing tension with Xi Meng and Fu, although Xi Wang remains loyal. After realizing his identity has been compromised, Fu goes into hiding. Wong's team soon locates him at a market and begins to follow him back to his lair. He volunteers to tail Fu, who is initially wary but later relaxes when Wong, posing as He's father, arrives to defuse the situation. The next day, Wong invites Fu over for dinner at a police-occupied apartment, where Fu tests their intentions. During the dinner, He learns that Wong has been secretly watching over her since her father's death. That night, an attempt on their lives by Xi Wang fails, leading them to suspect their cover has been blown.

On their way back to headquarters, Wong's vehicle is ambushed by mercenaries, but the police manage to fend them off. Meanwhile, Xi Meng lures Fu to an orphanage, where he finds thugs waiting to kill him. After a fierce fight, Fu defeats them. Xi Wang then appears to hold off Fu and instructs Xi Meng to detonate the orphanage before dying in the blast, but Fu survives the explosion and is arrested by the police. The police believe the adoptive sons will flee Macau through shipments leaving Wynn Palace. While being transported, Fu escapes, prompting his crew to flee as well. Hu and the others are subdued by Wong, while at the nearby Cotai East station, Fu fatally stabs a policeman and Xi Meng. As he dies, Xi Meng recites the key to the cryptocurrency account, consisting of a passphrase of 12 English words. The remaining two adoptive sons are arrested in the hotel.

Later, Wong and Qiuguo track down Fu to a tea house, where Qiuguo confronts Fu but is knocked out by him. Wong arrives and a fight breaks out between them, which ends with Wong being stabbed in the neck and Fu escaping. Qiuguo and the police eventually corner and arrest Fu, while Wong is saved by paramedics.

In the post-credits scene, a third identical brother of Xi Wang and Xi Meng is revealed. He identifies the passphrase from the smartwatch except for the 12th word, and places a bounty on Wong, He, and Fu. Fu, now in a cell, whispers the 12th word.

== Cast ==
- Jackie Chan as Wong Tak-chong, a Macanese cyber-intelligence expert who comes out of retirement
- Zhang Zifeng as He Qiuguo, a young police officer on Wong's elite team
- Tony Leung Ka-fai as Fu Lung-sang, a criminal mastermind who has been a fugitive for over 20 years
- Ci Sha as:
  - Xi Wang, Fu's favorite adoptive son and his right-hand man in the heist crew
  - Xi Meng, the second triplet brother of Xi Wang and Fu's adoptive son, who acts as the hacker for the crew
  - Xi Tai, the third triplet brother of Xi Wang and Xi Meng, who receives the encryption from Xi Meng in the post-credits scene

Also appearing in the film are Wen Junhui as Hu Feng, an adoptive son of Fu and the muscle of his heist crew; Lang Yueting as Wang Xuemei, the police inspector in charge of the Shadow case; Melvin Wong as a high-ranking police officer; Leo Wang as Wu Yaolei, a police detective and Wang's right-hand man who attempts to nab the Shadow and his gang at the beginning of the film; and Chaney Lin and Zhou Zhengjie as Xiao Xin and Liu Jinxiao, Fu's adoptive sons and members of his heist crew. Yuen Qiu made a cameo appearance but was ultimately cut from the film.

== Production ==
=== Development ===
Larry Yang had previously directed Adoring (2019) and Ride On (2023), two films that both examined interspecies friendship between humans and animals. The director also liked the Hong Kong film Eye in the Sky (2007) by Yau Nai-hoi, emotionally connecting with its characters and story. After Eye in the Sky was first remade into the South Korean film Cold Eyes (2013), Yang saw commercial potential in adapting the original film's story to address the technological advancements in modern-day surveillance.

After buying the rights to remake the 2007 film, Yang worked on the script for years. While he retained the original's narrative structure, including the idea of a surveillance team searching for an unknown suspect on foot, he wanted to avoid rehashing the story. Instead, Yang ended up writing approximately 85 to 90% new material. Yang updated the film to be set in present-day Macao, incorporating themes about technology and debates on whether traditional police tracking methods are still effective in the era of artificial intelligence. For the film's adversary Fu Longsheng, Yang based him on the antagonist of the original film, re-envisioning him as a survivor of the events in Eye in the Sky.

=== Pre-production ===
Victoria Hon, a producer on the film, acknowledged it was difficult finding financing for the project due to investors' pessimistic outlook on action films in the current Chinese market. She said, "To make investors believe in this genre, we worked hard on the script and building the characters." In 2023, The Shadow's Edge was registered with the National Radio and Television Administration, with Yang as director and Hairun Pictures as the producer. Jackie Chan was also announced for the lead role, marking his second collaboration with Yang after the commercially successful Ride On. In January 2025, Tony Leung Ka-fai and Wen Junhui, a member of the K-pop group Seventeen, were announced to star. Leung, who played the antagonist in the original film, reprised his role. Wen was personally invited to audition by Yang, who had seen some of his previous works.

The film was in pre-production for around five months. During this time, most of the action scenes were mapped out with storyboards, and shot as demos to be shown to Chan for feedback. The production team also went location scouting for eight months, with some scenes being naturally developed from the places they came across. The team reached out to Wynn Macau for filming permission after noticing that the hotel was in close proximity to the heist crew's escape from the Macau Tower.

=== Filming and post-production ===
Principal photography began in October 2024 in Macau, with shooting locations including the Macau Tower, Coloane, and Wynn Macau. Qian Tiantian, who has previously collaborated with Larry Yang and Jackie Chan on a short film, acted as the cinematographer, joining the project just 48 hours before shooting commenced. The film was shot on the CineAlta V2, which Qian noted was advantageous for capturing close-ups and quick movements during action sequences. Chan, then 71, performed all his own stunts without using doubles. Filming wrapped in January 2025, after 84 days. A total of 5,000 frames were shot, but only about 3,000 frames remained after post-production editing. Yuen Qiu, a fellow member of the Seven Little Fortunes alongside Chan, was slated for a cameo appearance but was ultimately cut from the film. By May 2025, the film was in post-production and was presented at the Cannes Film Market by Global Network Asia, where it was acquired by Plaion Pictures for Germany, SPI International for Eastern Europe, and ATV for Turkey. The film was also picked up for distribution in the United Kingdom by Trinity CineAsia. The Shadow's Edge featured a music score by French composer Nicolas Errèra.

== Release ==
The Shadow's Edge had its world premiere at Emperor Cinemas Taikoo Li Sanlitun in Taikoo Li Sanlitun, Beijing on 3 August 2025, followed by a nationwide theatrical release in China on 16 August. The film received a limited release in the United States on 22 August, and was theatrically released in Hong Kong on 11 September. It was screened in the Open Cinema section of the 30th Busan International Film Festival on 19 September. Overseas, the film was released in the United Kingdom on 3 October.

== Reception ==
=== Box office ===
The Shadow's Edge generated over RMB$11 million in presales on its first day, and grossed over RMB¥77 million on its opening day. By its tenth day of release, it had climbed to RMB¥577 million, and earned RMB¥182.9 million in its second week, topping the box office. The film continued to perform well in its third weekend, bringing in RMB¥191 million and remaining at the top of the weekly charts, which raised the total gross to approximately RMB¥767 million.

=== Critical response ===
On the review aggregator website Rotten Tomatoes, 83% of 12 critics' reviews are positive.

Alan Mount of Starburst gave The Shadow's Edge 5/5 stars and called it "one of the best action films of the year and it can't be recommended highly enough", applauding the "quality of the plentiful, spectacular action scenes" and that "Chan excels himself in the leading role". Tay Yek Keak of 8days gave the film 3.5/5 stars and praised it as "Jackie Chan's best action movie in years" and "Tony Leung [Ka-fai]'s best action flick ever", especially their "terrific veteran chumminess", alongside "big shootouts, vehicle smasheroos, stunt-team fighting".

James Marsh of the South China Morning Post gave the film 3/5 stars and found it to be somewhat better than recent Jackie Chan films, particularly in its action scenes, although he still criticizes it for being bogged down by "excessive melodrama" and "unnecessary twists". Conversely, Jayanty Nada Shofa of Jakarta Globe found the film to "mix some comedy into the story" like most Jackie Chan films, writing that "you might find yourself squealing at the cute young love moments".

Leslie Felperin of The Guardian gave the film 2/5 stars and described it as "overlong and unnecessarily complex", criticizing its "connective narrative tissue [that] is a bore, an overly complicated yarn", and noting that "the sentimental flashbacks further distend a way-too-long running time". John Lui of The Straits Times also gave the film 2/5 stars and considered that, despite the star power of Jackie Chan and Tony Leung Ka-fai, the film is an "aimless bloat" with "lazy screenwriting" and "too many cliches to count", where "excitement fizzles out in fight scenes that feel inorganic to the plot and, worse, go on ad nauseam".

== Awards and nominations ==
| Year | Award | Category | Nominee | Result | Ref. |
|---|---|---|---|---|---|
| 2026 | 32nd Hong Kong Film Critics Society Awards | Film of Merit | —N/a | Won | |
| 2026 | 44th Hong Kong Film Awards | Best Actor | Tony Leung Ka-fai | Won | |
| 2026 | 44th Hong Kong Film Awards | Best New Performer | Li Zhekun | Nominated | |
| 2026 | 44th Hong Kong Film Awards | Best Action Choreography | Su Hang | Won | |
| 2026 | 44th Hong Kong Film Awards | Best Sound Design | Wang Yanwei, Belle Lau | Nominated | |

== Future ==
On 7 January 2026, Jackie Chan announced plans to produce a sequel.In July 2026, the film was confirmed and filming began in October.
