= Vivian Dawson =

New Zealand actor and model

- Born: July 18, 1984 (age 42); Montreal, Quebec, Canada
- Other name: Jinrong (Stage name)
- Education: University of Otago
- Occupations: Actor; model
- Years active: 2009–present

Vivian Dawson
- Traditional Chinese: 錦榮
- Simplified Chinese: 锦荣
Transcriptions
Standard Mandarin
- Hanyu Pinyin: Jǐn Róng
- Wade–Giles: Chin^{3} Jung^{2}

Vivian Dawson (born July 18, 1984), better known by his stage name Jinrong (simplified Chinese: 锦荣; traditional Chinese: 錦榮), is a New Zealand actor and model.

== Early life and education ==
Dawson was born in Canada on July 18, 1984, and grew up in New Zealand. His father is a New Zealander, while his mother was a Chinese Singaporean. Dawson majored in physiology at University of Otago and graduated in 2007. After he graduated, he worked as a fitness professional in a health club in Melbourne and then moved to Singapore.

== Career ==
In 2009, Dawson won for CLEO (Singapore)'s 50 most eligible bachelors of 2009. In 2010, Dawson featured in the music video of Taiwanese singer Jolin Tsai song "Love Player". Dawson made his acting debut in Taiwanese film Double Trouble (2012). Dawson replaced the British actor Rhydian Vaughn and featured in two of the highest-grossing Chinese films, Tiny Times 3 (2014) and Tiny Times 4 (2015), which also helped him garner more popularity in Greater China.

== Personal life ==
In September 2010, Dawson and Tsai were spotted on a date in Tokyo. In February 2013, Dawson took Jolin Tsai to visit his parents and relatives in New Zealand. In December 2016, Jolin Tsai's manager Tom Wang confirmed that after 6 years of dating, Dawson and Tsai broke up amicably in November and remain close friends.

== Filmography ==
- Double Trouble (2012)
- Lover Run (2013)
- Sorry, I Love You (2014)
- Tiny Times 3 (2014)
- Tiny Times 4 (2015)
- All You Need is Love (2015)
- Running After the Love (2015)
- Xuanzang (2016)
- For a Few Bullets (2016)
- The Eight Immortals in School 2 (2016)
- Butterfly Cemetery (2017)
- My Other Home (2017)
- The Gravity of a Rainbow (2019)
- Once Upon a Time in Lingjian Mountain (2019)
- "Miss S" (2020)
