= White Miles =

Austrian rock duo

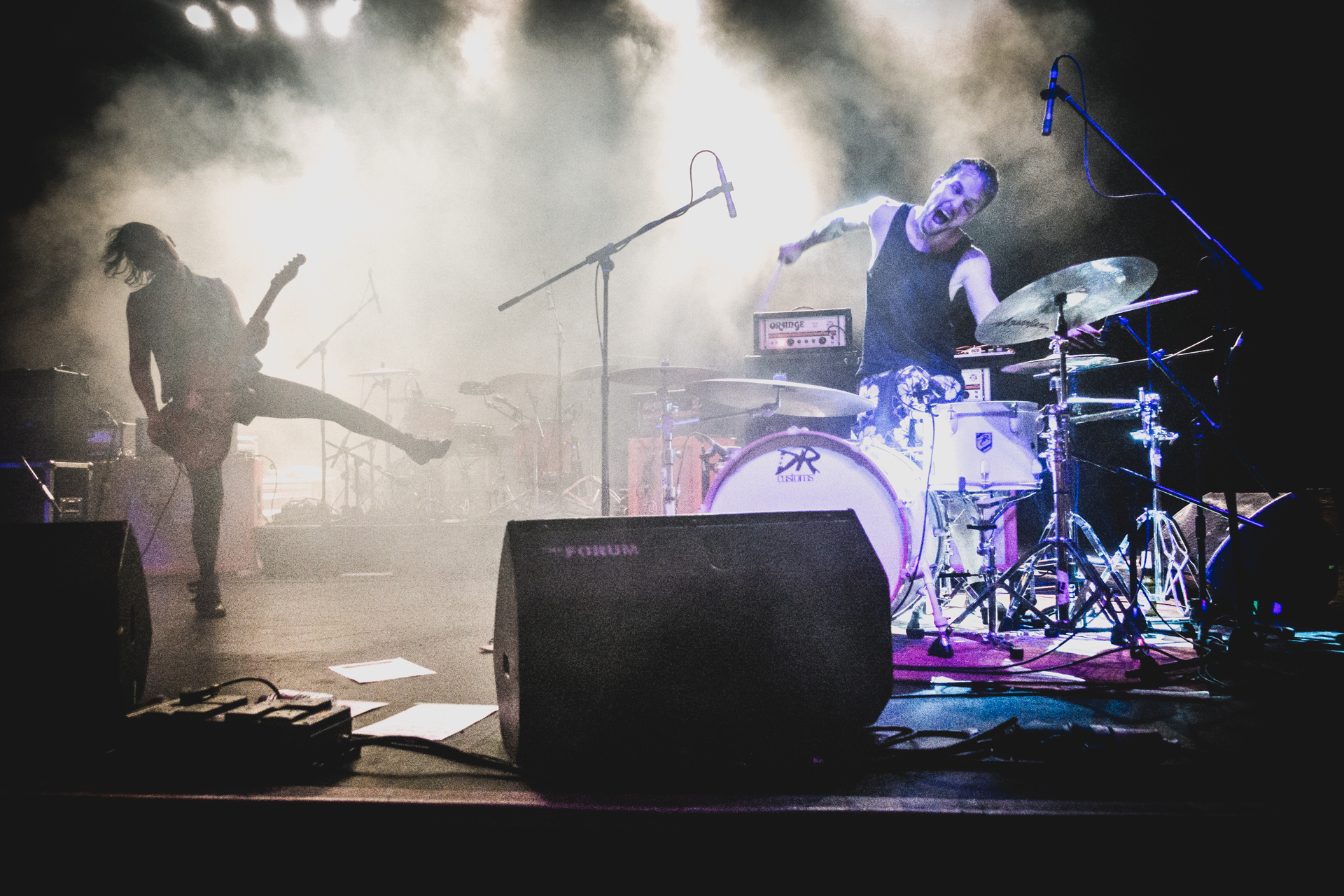
- White Miles supporting the Eagles of Death metal

Background information
- Origin: Tyrol, Austria
- Genres: Blues rock, stoner rock
- Years active: 2011–2017
- Labels: LLRR
- Members: Medina Rekic; Hansjörg Loferer
- Website: www.white-miles.com

White Miles was an Austrian rock duo, consisting of singer/guitarist Medina Rekic and drummer/singer Hansjörg Loferer and founded in 2011. They describe their musical style as "dirty pole dancer stoner blues rock". It oscillates between blues rock and stoner rock.

== History ==
The band claims to be descended from Madagascar, more precisely from its capital Antananarivo, but both members were born Tyrolese. They met in 2005, and decided to join in a new band in 2011. After early successes with four live video productions, they quit their day jobs and dedicated themselves to music. In 2014, the band was invited by Truckfighters and Courtney Love to join them as their opening act on tours throughout Europe and the UK. White Miles also cooperated with Munich-based Colour Haze and several Austrian groups. In 2014, their first studio album was produced by LLRR. Called job: genius, diagnose: madness, it was published on CD and vinyl record.

In October and November 2015, they served as the supporting act for the American group Eagles of Death Metal on their European tour. On 13 November 2015, the band escaped the November 2015 Paris attacks. Shortly after they had finished their opening act to the Eagles of Death Metal in Parisian Bataclan theatre, an attack on the venue led to 89 deaths and several severely wounded. In a statement on 18 November, the duo said "We are happy, but miserable at the same time. Happy, because we are back with our families, who help immensely to make us feel safe again; miserable, because we know that many families have to mourn following the weekend. It goes without saying that our thoughts are with all victims and their relatives." The remainder of the tour was canceled, but they began performing again at Innsbruck on 17 December 2015.

On 1 April 2016, their second album titled The Duel was released, also available on CD and vinyl. In April 2017 singer Medina Rekic left for own projects and the group disbanded.

== Discography ==
=== Studio albums ===
- 2014: job: genius, diagnose: madness (LLRR)
- 2016: The Duel

=== Videos ===
- 2014: Fake Smile
- 2014: Crazy Horse
