= Mountain Cry =

- Poster
- Directed by: Larry Yang
- Screenplay by: Larry Yang
- Based on: Mountain Cry by Ge Shuiping
- Produced by: Ellen Eliasoph; Victoria Hon
- Starring: Lang Yueting; Wang Ziyi; Cheng Taishen; Yu Ailei; Guo Jin
- Cinematography: Patrick Murguia
- Edited by: Super Zhang
- Music by: Nicolas Errèra
- Production companies: Village Roadshow Pictures Asia Ltd; Beijing Hairun Pictures Co Ltd
- Release date: 10 October 2015 (BIFF)
- Running time: 107 minutes
- Country: China
- Language: Mandarin

Mountain Cry (Chinese: 喊山) is a 2015 Chinese drama film directed by Larry Yang. The film is based on the novel of the same title by Ge Shuiping.

== Synopsis ==
Set in a remote village, the story begins with the sudden death of a husband and father whose family is new to the village's tight-knit traditional community. In the aftermath of that tragic event, the villagers come to know and understand the man's widow, a mysterious mute with a story to tell and the power to tell it wordlessly.

== Cast ==
- Lang Yueting as Hong Xia
- Wang Ziyi as Han Chong
- Cheng Taishen
- Yu Ailei as La Hong
- Guo Jin
- Xu Caigen as Qi Liu
- Zhao Chendong
- Li Siying

== Production ==
Production started in early October 2014 and principal photography took place in Shanxi.

== Release ==
The film was the closing film at the 20th Busan International Film Festival.

== Reception ==
=== Critical response ===
Justin Chang of Variety called the film a "forceful small-town melodrama [that] offers a sweeping indictment of human vindictiveness."
