= Larry Yang =

Chinese film director

- Other name: Yang Zi
- Education: Beijing Film Academy; University of Edinburgh
- Occupation: Film director
- Years active: 2012–present
- Notable work: Mountain Cry (2015)

Chinese name
- Traditional Chinese: 楊子
- Simplified Chinese: 杨子
Transcriptions
Standard Mandarin
- Hanyu Pinyin: Yáng zǐ

Larry Yang is a Chinese film director. Yang is from Harbin. He studied at the Beijing Film Academy and the University of Edinburgh in the United Kingdom. His first feature film, Nana (2012), received a nomination at the Five One Project Awards.

Yang decided to adapt Ge Shuiping's 2005 novella Mountain Cry, which won a Lu Xun Literary Prize, after first reading it in 2008, two years after graduating from the Beijing Film Academy. The story of a mute girl in a remote village, treated as an outsider until befriended by a young boy, resonated with his own feelings of isolation after returning to China in 2004 and struggling to establish his voice as a filmmaker. A social drama, Mountain Cry was the closing film at the 20th Busan International Film Festival in 2015.

== Filmography ==
Year	Film	Notes
2012	Nana	
2014	Sorry, I Love You	
2015	Mountain Cry	1st of 4 collaborations with Lang Yueting
2017	My Other Home	
2019	Adoring	
2023	Ride On	1st of 2 collaborations with Jackie Chan
2025	The Shadow's Edge	
