= Lang Yueting =

Chinese actress (born 1985)

- Born: 22 March 1985 (age 41); Dalian City, Liaoning, China
- Education: Central Conservatory of Music
- Occupations: Actress; pianist
- Years active: 2009–present
- Agent: Galaxy Hairun Performing Arts

Chinese name
- Traditional Chinese: 郎躍亭
- Simplified Chinese: 郎月婷
Transcriptions
Standard Mandarin
- Hanyu Pinyin: Láng Yuètíng

Lang Yueting (Chinese: 郎月婷; born 22 March 1985) is a Chinese actress and pianist. She is known for her roles in the motion pictures Blind Detective, Mountain Cry and Seven Killings.

== Biography ==
Lang studied with pianist Sheng Yuan at the Central Conservatory of Music in Beijing. During her college years, she performed at the International Keyboard Institute and Festival in New York and OpusFest in the Philippines. In 2009, she was invited to be the piano soloist at the opening ceremony of the 2009 Winter Universiade in Harbin.

She began switching to acting in 2011, when she worked on stage with Pu Cunxin in the play Ivanov. In 2013, Lang appeared in the first of two Johnnie To films, Blind Detective, and has since acted in many movies and TV series. In 2015, she won the Asian Newcomer Award at the 20th Busan International Film Festival.

== Filmography ==
Year	English title	Chinese title	Role
2013	Blind Detective	盲探	Minnie
2015	Office	華麗上班族	Kat Ho
2015	Mountain Cry	喊山	Hong Xia
2016	Tik Tok	驚天大逆轉	Yang Xi
2017	Extraordinary Mission	非凡任務	Qingshui
2017	Love Education	相愛相親	Weiwei
2019	Adoring	寵愛	Dr. Ai
2020	Like a Friend	不期而遇的夏天	Yuan Guilian
2020	A Day Deal	一日成交	Li Tao
2020	Huang Wenxiu	秀美人生	Huang Wenxiu
2021	The Blooming Moss	青苔花開	Fang Xiang
2023	Ride On	龙马精神	Luo Xiaobao's mother
2023	The Volunteers: To the War	志愿军：雄兵出击	Gong Pusheng
2023	Seven Killings	刀尖	Lin Yingying
2024	The Untold Story	那个不为人知的故事	Yang Zhao
2025	Trapped	大风杀	Li Hong
2025	The Shadow's Edge	捕風追影	Wang Xuemei
