= Théâtre Libre (performing arts center) =

Theatre in Paris, France

Coordinates: 48.8698°N 2.3550°E

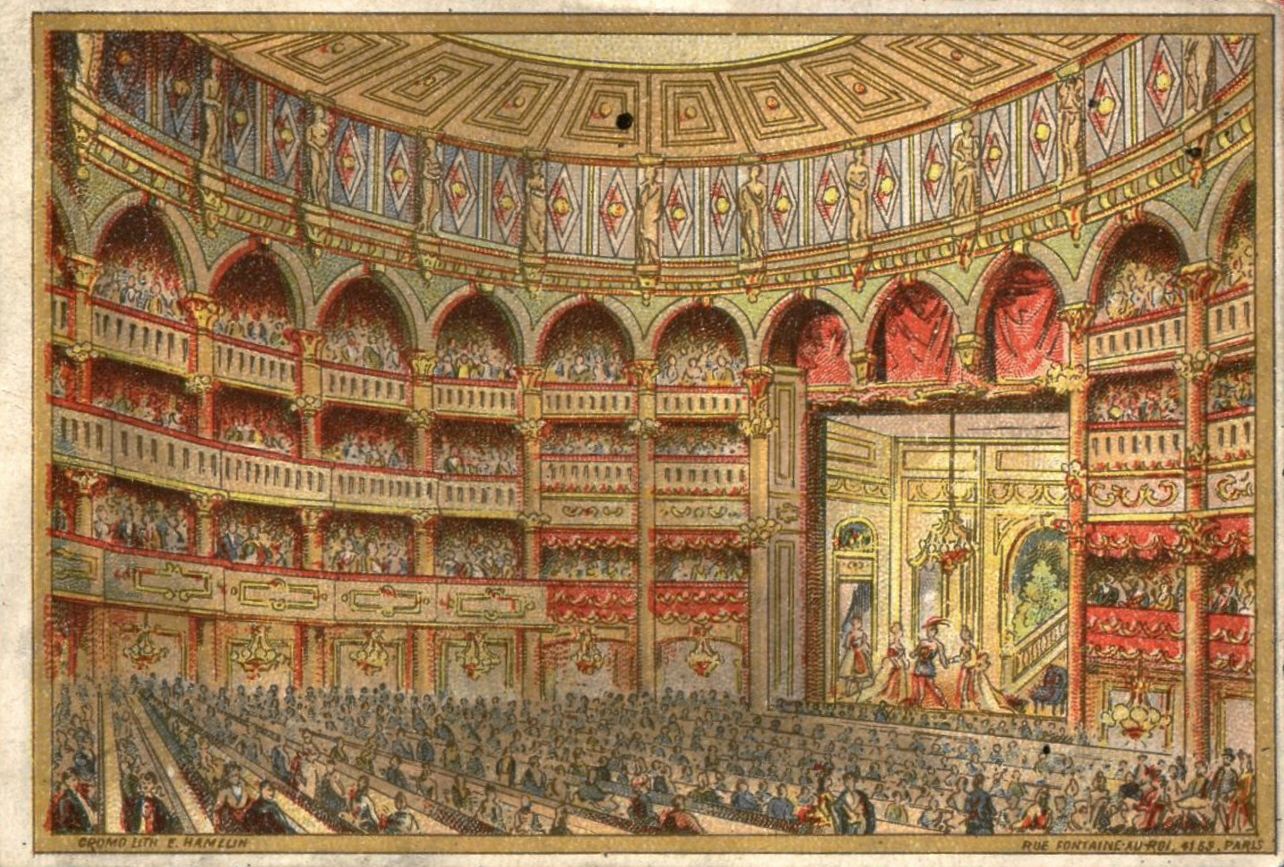
Interior of the Eldorado in the late 19th century.

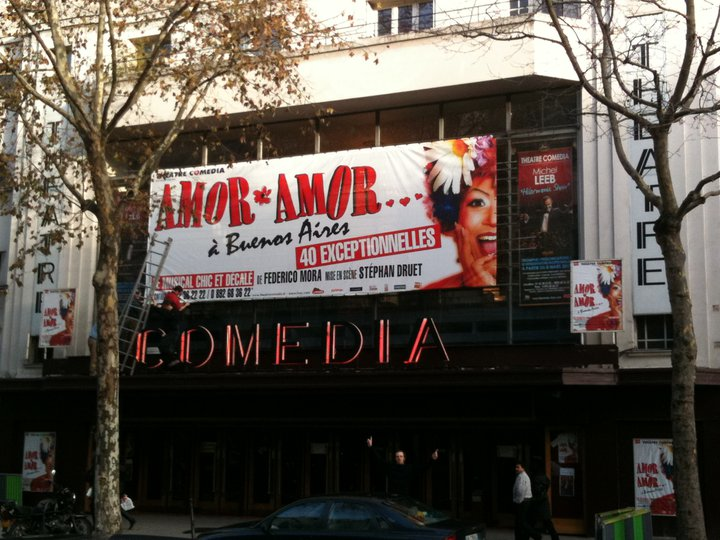
The venue in 2011, then known as Comedia

Théâtre Libre (French pronunciation: [teɑtʁ libʁ]), formerly Eldorado and then Comédia (or Théâtre Comedia), is a 934-capacity performing arts center located at 4 Boulevard de Strasbourg in Paris, France.

== History ==
The original venue was built in 1858 and became the Eldorado Café-concert in 1862. It became one of the leading cafés-concerts, with its audience described by the Goncourt brothers in 1865. In 1892 Toulouse-Lautrec produced an advertising poster for Aristide Bruant's performance there.

Walter Sickert's 1906 painting "The Eldorado, Paris" depicts the patrons in the galleries.

The original hall was demolished and reconstructed as a 2000-seat cinema in 1932–33.

In 1993 the entrance hall and cinema hall were designated a Patrimoine du XXe siècle ("20th Century Cultural Heritage").

In 2000 a new proprietor renamed the venue "Comédia".

In 2007, American actor/director John Malkovich directed Ariel Wizman and Vincent Elbaz in Good Canary at the Comédia.

== Théâtre Libre ==
In 2017, under new ownership, it was again renamed, to become "Théâtre Libre".

In recent times, the venue has hosted artists such as R.E.M., Bon Jovi, Joan Jett and INXS.
