= Nade Dieu =

Belgian actress

Nade Dieu, born on 2 August 1973, is a Belgian actress.

== Filmography ==
=== Film ===
- 1997 : Maigret L'Inspecteur Cadavre
- 2002 : The Butterfly by Philippe Muyl
- 2002 : Y a pas d'âge pour s’aimer by Thierry Chabert
- 2004 : Demain on déménage by Chantal Akerman
- 2004 : Notre musique by Jean-Luc Godard
- 2006 : Barrage by Raphaël Jacoulot
- 2007 : L'Autre Moitié by Rolando Colla
- 2008 : Sois sage by Juliette Garcias
- 2016 : Down by love as The captain
- 2018 : Angel Face as Mathilda

=== TV ===
- 2009–16 : Un village français as Marie Germain
- 2017–18 : The Chalet as Mathilde Raynard
