= Crazy New Year's Eve =

- Film poster
- 一路惊喜
- Directed by: Eva Jin; Pan Anzi; Zhang Jiarui; Song Di
- Written by: Eva Jin; Zhang Yifan; Zhao Moyan
- Produced by: Gong Ying
- Cinematography: Randy Che
- Production companies: Mengyinghua（Beijing）Media Co., Ltd; Media Asia Group; Beijing Huagai Yingyue Entertainment Co., Ltd; Wanda Media Co., Ltd; Wuzhou Film Distribution Co., Ltd; Zhejiang Yuyou Entertainment Co., Ltd
- Distributed by: Wanda Media
- Release date: 6 February 2015 (China)
- Running time: 120 minutes
- Country: China
- Language: Mandarin
- Box office: CN¥69.7 million

Crazy New Year's Eve (Chinese: 一路惊喜) is a 2015 Chinese romantic comedy family film directed by Eva Jin, Pan Anzi, Zhang Jiarui and Song Di. It was released on 6 February 2015.

== Cast ==
- Amber Kuo
- Jam Hsiao
- Zanilia Zhao
- Rhydian Vaughan
- Xia Yu
- Crazybarby Leni Lan
- Mei Ting
- Zhang Yi
- Gordon Lam
- Da Peng
- Jiang Jinfu
- Sun Yizhou
- Chang Xinyuan
- Kan Qingzi
- Julius Liu
- Show Joy
- Qiao Shan
- Eva Jin
- White. K
- Gabriella

== Reception ==
The film earned CN¥69.702 million at the Chinese box office.
