= Huang Xuan =

Chinese actor

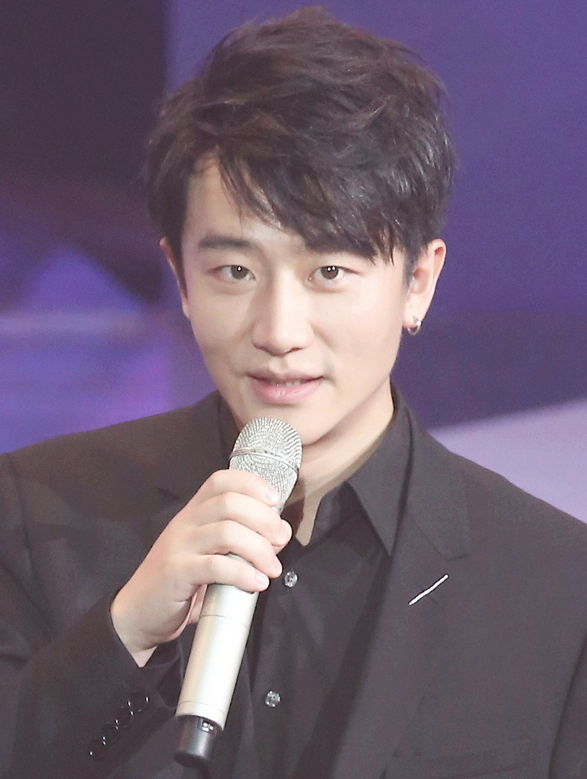
- Huang in 2017
- Born: 3 March 1985 (age 41); Lanzhou, Gansu, China
- Education: Beijing Dance Academy
- Occupation: Actor
- Years active: 2008–present
- Agent: Qianyi Times

Chinese name
- Traditional Chinese: 黃軒
- Simplified Chinese: 黄轩
Transcriptions
Standard Mandarin
- Hanyu Pinyin: Huáng Xuān

Huang Xuan (Chinese: 黄轩, born 3 March 1985) is a Chinese actor. He is best known for his roles in the films Blind Massage (2014), Youth (2017), and Legend of the Demon Cat (2017), as well as the television series The Legend of Mi Yue (2015), The Interpreter (2016), Minning Town (2021), and Luoyang (2021).

== Life and career ==
Born and raised in Lanzhou, Gansu, China, Huang graduated from Beijing Dance Academy in 2008. He made his film debut in The Shaft the same year. Among his notable projects in earlier years were The Dream of Red Mansions and Driverless.

Huang rose to fame in 2014 with his performance in the television series Red Sorghum and film Blind Massage, and was awarded the Rising Actor award at the China TV Drama Awards. He also played supporting roles in The Golden Era directed by Ann Hui; as well as music film Blue Sky Bones directed by Cui Jian; where he received praise for both his performances. In 2015, Huang starred in historical drama The Legend of Mi Yue and earned the title of "People's First Love" for his role as Huang Xie.

In 2016, he won the Best Actor award at the Hengdian Film and TV Festival of China for his role as Zhu Qiyu in the historical-medical drama The Imperial Doctress. The same year, he starred in The Interpreter, which became the highest rated drama of the year.

In 2017, he starred in the crime thriller film Extraordinary Mission directed by Alan Mak. He won the Best Action Movie New Performer award at the Jackie Chan Action Movie Awards for his performance in the film. The same year, Huang starred in the fantasy drama Tribes and Empires: Storm of Prophecy by Jin Hezai, set in the fictional universe of Novoland. He was also cast as the male lead in Youth, a coming-of-age film directed by Feng Xiaogang; and starred in Chen Kaige's fantasy mystery film Legend of the Demon Cat.

In 2018, Huang was cast in Cao Baoping's upcoming film The Perfect Blue, alongside Fan Bingbing. The same year, he starred in the modern workplace drama Entrepreneurial Age.

In 2019, Huang starred in the spy action drama Sniper directed by Guo Shubo and Bie Ke. The same year he starred in romance film Only Clouds Know directed by Feng Xiaogang.

== Personal life ==
Huang spoke about his first two relationships during his 2017 appearance on The Jin Xing Show, though he did not reveal their names. His first relationship was with a schoolmate while he was studying at Guangdong Dance School during his secondary education. The relationship lasted three years but ended when Huang moved to Beijing after graduation to continue his studies, while she stayed in Guangdong. His second relationship, also with a schoolmate, took place during his time at the Beijing Dance Academy. This relationship lasted four years but ended a year after his university graduation.

Huang was briefly in a relationship with actress Li Qian after collaborating on Feng Xiaogang's film Back to 1942, which began filming in October 2011. The relationship ended by early 2012. In 2016, Huang was rumored to be dating South Korean actress Song Ha-yoon. He later clarified on The Jin Xing Show that the relationship ended before it officially began, partly due to a language barrier: "We tried to start a relationship but quickly realized we weren't compatible, so it ended shortly thereafter." In September 2024, Huang announced that he was in a relationship with a British Chinese model, though he did not reveal her name.

== Opposition to criticism of human rights in China ==
In 2021, Huang terminated his endorsement contract with the clothing manufacturer H&M after it accused China for human rights violations against Uyghurs in the Xinjiang region of China where cotton for clothing products is grown.

== Filmography ==
=== Film ===
| Year | English title | Chinese title | Role | Notes |
|---|---|---|---|---|
| 2008 | The Shaft | 地下的天空 | Jing Sheng | |
| 2008 | | 海下尖刀 | Guo Xiaoyang | |
| 2009 | Chengdu, I Love You | 成都，我爱你 | Li Hao | |
| 2009 | Spring Fever | 春風沉醉的夜晚 | Ye Xiao | Scenes cut |
| 2010 | Driverless | 无人驾驶 | Li Jia | |
| 2011 | The Founding of a Party | 建党伟业 | Liu Renjing | |
| 2012 | Joyful Reunion | 飲食男女：好遠又好近 | Hou Yufan | |
| 2012 | First Time | 第一次 | Li Rao | |
| 2012 | Nightmare | 青魘 | Hao Dong | |
| 2013 | | 白相 | Wang Xuan | |
| 2014 | Blind Massage | 推拿 | Xiao Ma | |
| 2014 | Breaking the Waves | 黃金時代 | Zhao Jiafeng | |
| 2014 | The Golden Era | 黃金時代 | Luo Binji | |
| 2014 | Blue Sky Bones | 藍色骨頭 | Chen Dong | |
| 2015 | Cities in Love | 恋爱中的城市 | Liu Chang | |
| 2016 | The Great Wall | 长城 | Commander of the Deer Troop | |
| 2017 | Extraordinary Mission | 非凡任务 | Lin Kai | |
| 2017 | Youth | 芳华 | Liu Feng | |
| 2017 | Legend of the Demon Cat | 妖猫传 | Bai Letian | |
| 2018 | Unserious Hero | 玩世英雄 | Wu Sen | Web film |
| 2019 | Only Clouds Know | 只有芸知道 | Sui Dongfeng | |
| 2021 | 1921 | 1921 | Li Da | |
| 2021 | Wu Hai | 乌海 | Yang Hua | |
| 2021 | My Country, My Parents | 我和我的父辈 | Shi Ruhong | |
| 2021 | The Battle at Lake Changjin | 长津湖 | Mao An Ying | |
| 2023 | Moscow Mission | 莫斯科行动 | Miao Qingshan | |
| 2025 | Operation Hadal | 蛟龙行动 | Meng Chuang | |
| TBA | The Sand | 撼沙 | | |
| TBA | Folding City | 折叠城市 | | |

=== Television series ===
| Year | English title | Chinese title | Role | Notes |
|---|---|---|---|---|
| 2007 | | 真情人生 | Liu Xiaohu | |
| 2008 | | 晒幸福 | Chuan Zhang | |
| 2010 | The Dream of Red Mansions | 红楼梦 | Xue Ke | |
| 2011 | Dark War in the Dawn | 黎明前的暗戰 | Xiao Tianji | |
| 2011 | You Are My Happiness | 你是我的幸福 | Yan Xiaolei | |
| 2012 | | 铁血男儿夏明翰 | Sun Yueze | |
| 2013 | Love is not for Sale | 棋逢对手 | Zheng Mo | |
| 2013 | Woman Gang | 女人帮 | Fang Ge | |
| 2014 | Red Sorghum | 红高粱 | Zhang Junjie | |
| 2015 | The Legend of Mi Yue | 芈月传 | Huang Xie | |
| 2016 | The Imperial Doctress | 女医·明妃传 | Zhu Qiyu | |
| 2016 | Hunter | 猎人 | Ye Luqi | |
| 2016 | The Interpreter | 亲爱的翻译官 | Cheng Jiayang | |
| 2017 | Tribes and Empires: Storm of Prophecy | 九州·海上牧云记 | Muyun Sheng | |
| 2018 | Entrepreneurial Age | 创业时代 | Guo Xinnian | |
| 2020 | Perfect Partner | 完美关系 | Wei Zhe | |
| 2020 | Sniper | 瞄准 | Su Wenxian | |
| 2021 | Minning Town | 山海情 | Ma Defu | |
| 2021 | Luoyang | 风起洛阳 | Gao Bing Zhu | |
| TBA | My Super Hero | 我的超级英雄 | Zhang Guang Zheng | |

=== Television show ===
| Year | English title | Chinese title | Role | Network | Notes/Ref. |
|---|---|---|---|---|---|
| 2020 | Summer Surf Shop | 夏日冲浪店 | Cast member | iQiyi | |

== Discography ==
| Year | English title | Chinese title | Album | Notes |
|---|---|---|---|---|
| 2013 | "I Don't Want Anymore" | 不要了 | Love is not for Sale OST | |
| 2015 | "Do You Hear Me?" | 你有没有听到我 | —N/a | |
| 2016 | "Dumb" | 蠢 | Hunter OST | |
| 2016 | "Running Snail" | 奔跑的蜗牛 | The Interpreter OST | |
| 2017 | "Mayfly" | 蜉蝣 | Extraordinary Mission OST | |
| 2017 | "Those Flowers" | 那些花兒 | Youth OST | |

== Awards and nominations ==
| Year | Award | Category | Nominated work | Result | Ref. |
|---|---|---|---|---|---|
| 2014 | 6th China TV Drama Awards | Rising Actor Award | —N/a | Won | |
| 2015 | 21st Shanghai Television Festival | Best Supporting Actor | Red Sorghum | Nominated | |
| 2015 | 6th China Film Director's Guild Awards | Best Actor | Blind Massage | Nominated | |
| 2015 | 22nd Beijing College Student Film Festival | Best Actor | Blind Massage | Nominated | |
| 2015 | 15th Chinese Film Media Awards | Most Anticipated Performance | Blind Massage | Nominated | |
| 2015 | 10th Chinese Young Generation Film Forum Awards | Best New Actor | Blind Massage | Won | |
| 2016 | 3rd Hengdian Film and TV Festival of China | Best Actor | The Imperial Doctress | Won | |
| 2016 | 8th China TV Drama Awards | Talented Actor Award | The Interpreter | Won | |
| 2017 | 22nd Huading Awards | Best Actor | The Interpreter | Nominated | |
| 2017 | 3rd Jackie Chan Action Movie Awards | Best Action Movie New Performer | Extraordinary Mission | Won | |
| 2017 | 9th Macau International Movie Festival | Best Actor | Youth | Nominated | |
| 2018 | 9th China Film Director's Guild Awards | Best Actor | Youth | Nominated | |
| 2018 | 23rd Huading Awards | Best Actor | Youth | Nominated | |
| 2018 | 24th Huading Awards | Best Actor (Ancient Drama) | Tribes and Empires: Storm of Prophecy | Nominated | |
| 2019 | 17th Golden Phoenix Awards | Society Award | Legend of the Demon Cat | Won | |
| 2019 | 6th The Actors of China Award Ceremony | Best Actor (Emerald Category) | Entrepreneurial Age | Nominated | |
| 2019 | Cosmo Glam Night | Person of The Year (Dream) | —N/a | Won | |
| 2020 | Jinri Toutiao Awards Ceremony | Charismatic Actor of the Year | —N/a | Won | |
| 2020 | China Literature Award Ceremony | Inventive Actor of the Year | —N/a | Won | |
| 2020 | 7th The Actors of China Award Ceremony | Best Actor (Emerald) | —N/a | Nominated | |
| 2021 | 27th Shanghai Television Festival | Best Actor | Minning Town | Nominated | |
| 2022 | 33rd Flying Apsaras Awards | Outstanding Actor | Minning Town | Nominated | |
| 2022 | 31st China TV Golden Eagle Awards | Best Actor | Minning Town | Nominated | |

=== Forbes China Celebrity 100 ===
| Year | Rank | Ref. |
|---|---|---|
| 2017 | 78th | |
| 2019 | 74th | |
| 2020 | 48th | |
