= Double Trouble (2012 film) =

2012 Taiwanese action comedy film directed by David Chang

- Directed by: David Chang
- Written by: Sho-heng Yeh; Hongyi Zhang
- Produced by: Michelle Yeh
- Starring: Jaycee Chan; Xia Yu
- Cinematography: Wing-Hang Wong
- Edited by: Ian Lin
- Distributed by: China Lion
- Release date: June 8, 2012
- Running time: 92 minutes
- Country: Taiwan
- Language: Mandarin

Double Trouble (寶島雙雄) is a 2012 Taiwanese action comedy film directed by David Chang and starring Jaycee Chan and Xia Yu.

== Plot summary ==
Chan plays Jay, a Taiwanese museum security guard who springs into action when a priceless, 400-year-old scroll is stolen and he is mistakenly accused. Through circumstances, he winds up partnered with Ocean (Xia Yu), a vacationing security guard from Beijing. They are forced to work together to track down a legendary Chinese painting that has been stolen by international art thieves. Since neither man exactly represents the pinnacle of their profession, hijinks, if not hilarity, ensues.

== Cast ==
- Jaycee Chan
- Xia Yu
- Chang Fei
- Jessica Cambensy
- Amber Ann
- Vivian Dawson
- Chen Han-dian
