= Bataclan (theatre) =

Theatre in Paris, France

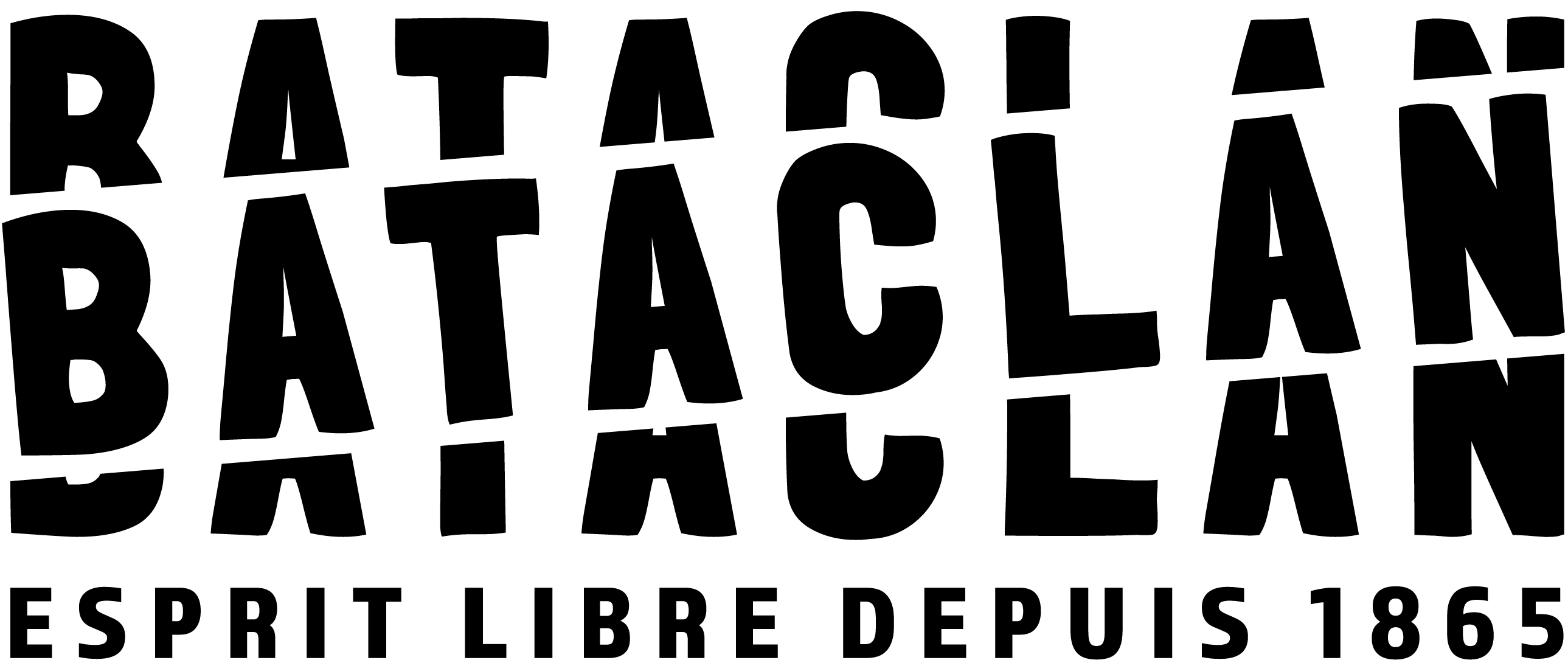

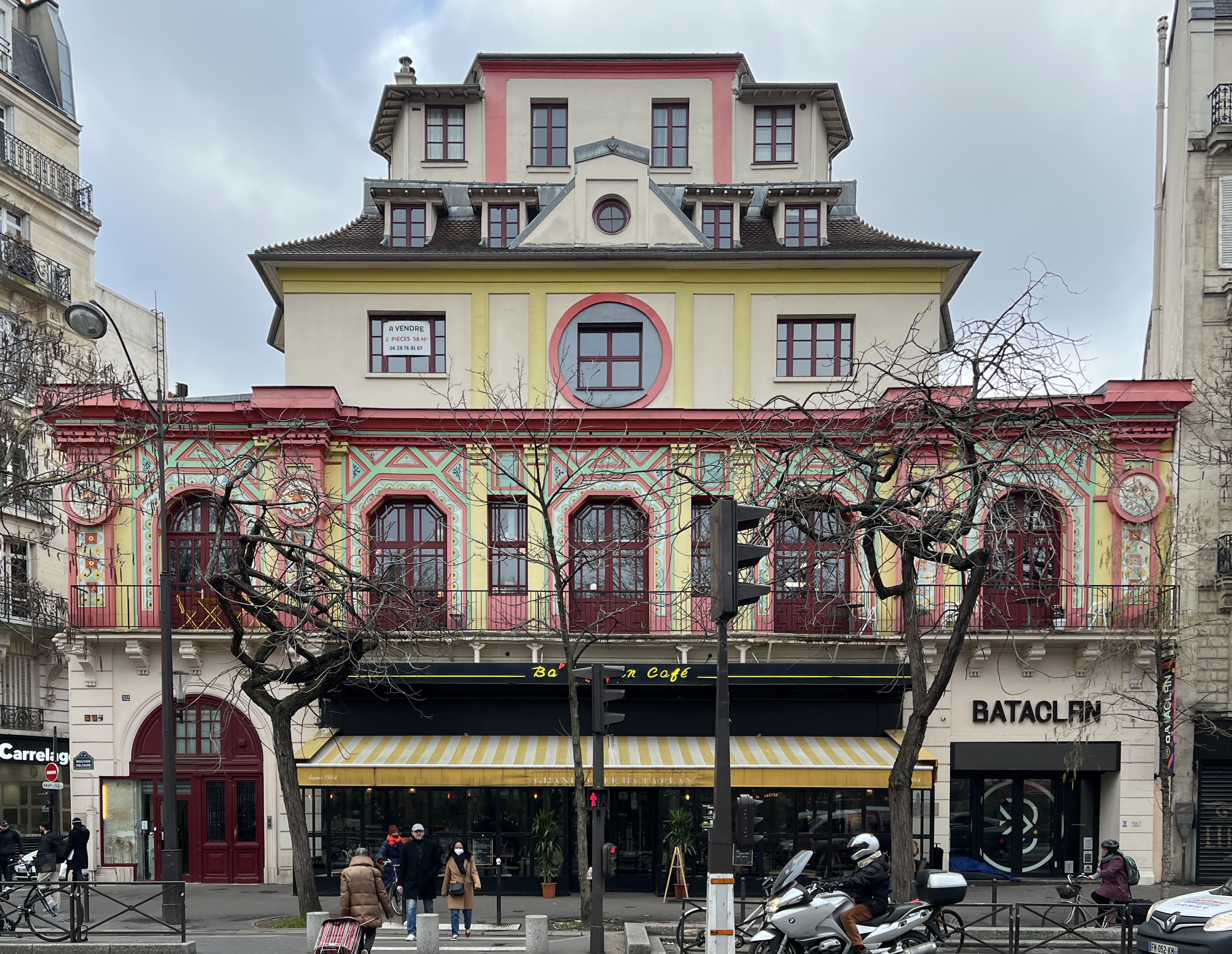
- The Bataclan theatre in 2022

- Location of the venue in central Paris Bataclan (France)
- Address: 50 Boulevard Voltaire
- Location: Paris, France
- Coordinates: 48°51′47″N 2°22′15″E
- Capacity: 1,694
- Public transit: Oberkampf

Construction
- Built: 1864; 162 years ago
- Opened: 3 February 1865
- Renovated: 2006, 2016
- Architect: Charles Duval
- Type: Theatre

History
- Built: 1864

Site notes
- Architect: Charles Duval
- Architectural style: Chinoiserie
- Governing body: Private

Monument historique
- Official name: Bataclan
- Designated: 3 November 1991
- Reference no.: PA00086554

The Bataclan (French pronunciation: [bataklɑ̃]) is a theatre located at 50 Boulevard Voltaire in the 11th arrondissement of Paris, France. Designed in 1864 by the architect Charles Duval, its name refers to Ba-ta-clan, an operetta by Jacques Offenbach. Since the early 1970s, it has been a venue for rock music. On 13 November 2015, 90 people were killed in a coordinated terrorist attack in the theatre.

== History ==
=== Origin and use ===
The Bataclan originated as a large café-concert in the Chinoiserie style, with the café and theatre on the ground floor and a large dance hall at first-floor level. Its original name was Grand Café Chinois.

The French name "Bataclan" refers to the Offenbach operetta, but it is also a pun on the expression tout le bataclan (the "kit and caboodle", or "all that jazz", or "the whole nine yards"), the oldest written use of which predates Offenbach by almost a century, in a journal entry of 11 November 1761 by Charles Simon Favart.

Concerts were held there but it was best known for putting on the vaudevilles of Eugène Scribe, Jean-François Bayard, Mélesville, and Théophile Marion Dumersan.

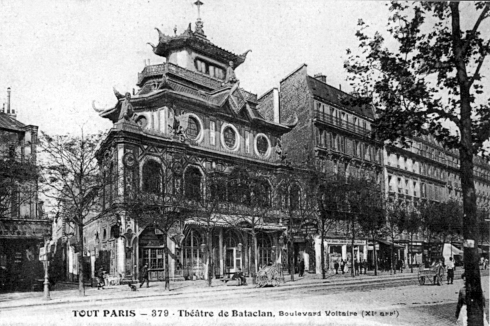
Postcard of the Bataclan with its original pagoda roof, c. 1900

The establishment, designed in 1864 by the architect Charles Duval, opened under the management of André Martin Paris on 3 February 1865 and was later bought by the singer Paulus in 1892. Also in 1892, Buffalo Bill Cody performed there. Over the next several years the building experienced both good and bad luck, and many changes in ownership. New fashions after 1910 led to a restoration of the auditorium and a programme dedicated solely to revues, especially those put on by José de Bérys. Maurice Chevalier had his first theatrical success there, and Édith Piaf also performed there. Inspired by their new successes, the Bataclan troupe took big shows on a South American tour that proved financially disastrous.

In 1926 the auditorium was sold and transformed into a cinema. A fire broke out in the building in 1933. The original building was partially demolished in 1950 to bring it into compliance with new safety measures then in force. In 1969, the cinema closed and the auditorium again became a salle de spectacle (usually translated as theatre, occasionally as exhibition hall).

The venue started booking rock acts in the 1970s, and many famous performers have played there since. Among them are Genesis, Soft Machine, Dream Theater, Phish, and Kraftwerk. Following the terror attacks on 13 November 2015, during the concert by Eagles of Death Metal, the theatre was closed for repairs. The venue reopened one year after the attack with a Sting concert.

The Bataclan is known today for a very eclectic programme of events, including rock and pop concerts, spectacles, comedy, discos and café-théâtre. Its façade was repainted in its original colours in 2006, but its pagoda roof has been removed. In May 2015, the theatre hosted a "Who Is Malcolm X" event, featuring Muslim rappers Médine, Kery James, Disiz and Faada Freddy.

Jeff Buckley recorded his EP Live from the Bataclan there in 1995. Progressive metal band Dream Theater recorded their 1998 live album Once in a LIVEtime at the Bataclan. The 1972 performance by Lou Reed, John Cale and Nico of the Velvet Underground, long circulated as a bootleg, was officially released in 2004 as Le Bataclan '72. Camel's 2001 live album The Paris Collection was recorded there. MGMT recorded a live EP, Qu'est-ce que c'est la vie, chaton?, at the venue in 2010. The EP would also be included as bonus tracks on certain versions of MGMT's second studio album, Congratulations.

=== Threats for pro-Israel activities ===
For 40 years, the Bataclan had Jewish owners, Pascal and Joel Laloux, who sold the theatre to new owners on 11 September 2015. The theatre was a target for anti-Zionist activists, since the venue often held pro-Israel events. One extremist group called "Army of Islam" threatened the Bataclan in 2011 because its owners were Jews.

Pro-Palestinian activists have protested against the Bataclan's association with pro-Israel activities. A video posted on YouTube shows masked pro-Palestinian militant protesters at the Bataclan in 2008 stating: "We came here to pass along a small message. Be warned. Next time we won’t be coming here to talk."

=== 2015 terrorist attacks ===
On 13 November 2015, as part of a series of Islamic State of Iraq and the Levant (ISIL) terrorist attacks across Paris, three gunmen who were French nationals of Algerian descent conducted a mass shooting at the Bataclan. An Austrian duo, the White Miles, had completed their performance, and the American rock band Eagles of Death Metal were in the middle of their performance when three gunmen wearing suicide belts entered the theatre, firing at people at random and taking hostages. The police later stormed the theatre and two gunmen killed themselves during the police raid by detonating suicide vests they were wearing. A third was killed by police gunfire before he could detonate his vest. Two of the attackers, Samy Amimour and Omar Ismaïl Mostefaï, were French citizens. The third attacker, Foued Mohamed-Aggad, was carrying what was thought to be a stolen Syrian passport. As a result of the attacks, 91 people were killed and over 200 were wounded. The band members of Eagles of Death Metal and most of the road crew escaped unharmed, although their merchandise manager Nick Alexander was among the fatalities.

==== Aftermath of attack ====
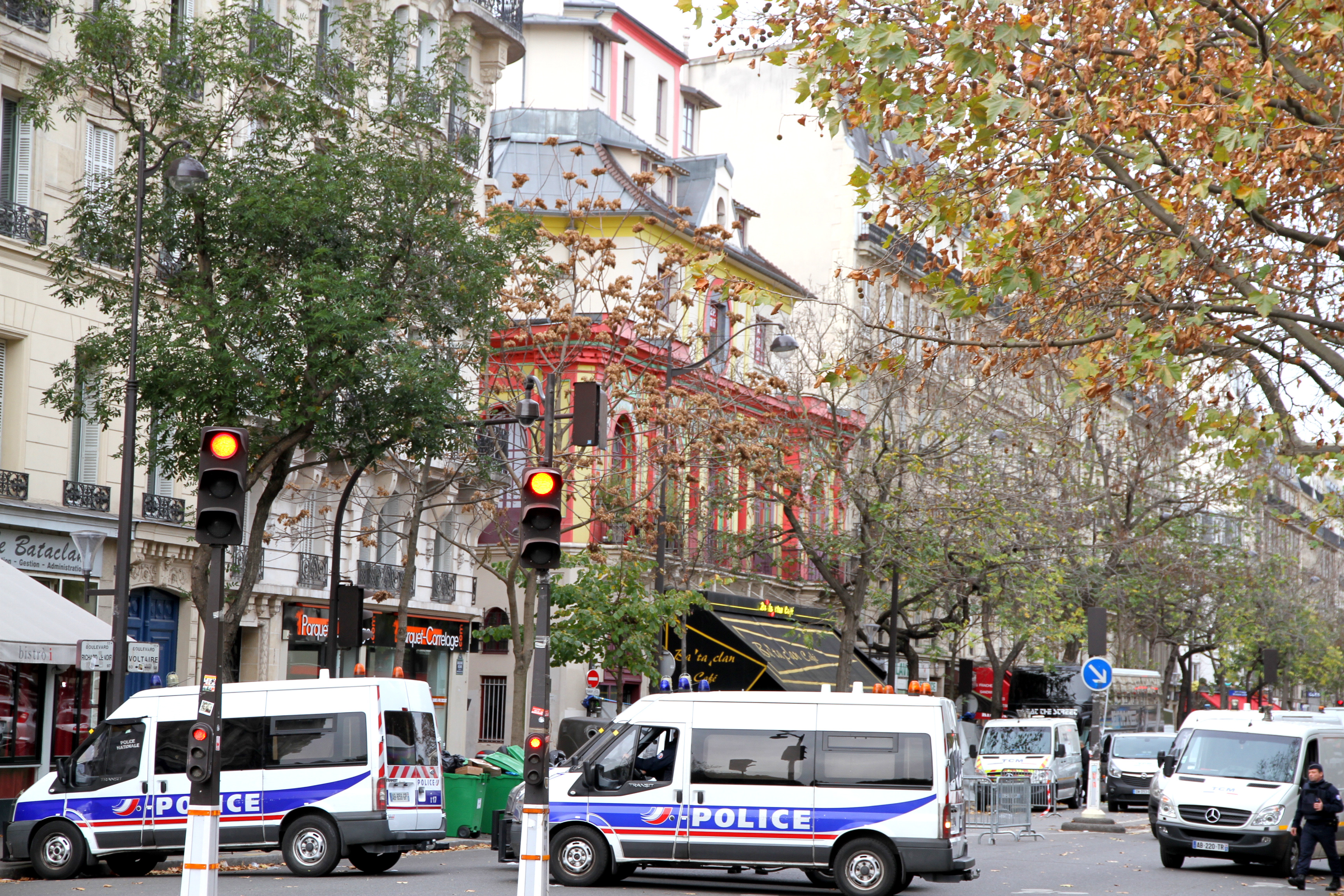
The Bataclan the day after the mass shooting and explosive detonation

It was discovered shortly after the news broke of the attacks that the American rock band Deftones had members in attendance at the Eagles of Death Metal Show. The lead singer of Deftones, Chino Moreno, was eating dinner nearby with his family. Deftones had been scheduled to perform at the Bataclan on the following nights.

Irish rock band U2 had been scheduled to perform two Paris concerts in the days following the attack, including one to be broadcast live on HBO. The French government cancelled the concert and the members of the band went to the Bataclan the day after the attack, leaving bouquets of flowers in memory of the victims. Lead singer Bono offered condolences and the band pledged to reschedule their Paris shows.

On 16 November, the Bataclan management issued a statement that stated that the theatre was closed indefinitely. It read, "No words suffice to express the magnitude of our grief. Our thoughts go to the victims, to the wounded and to their loved ones. Many of you have wanted to gather in remembrance at the Bataclan. Unfortunately, the authorities still need to work at the site. We will keep you informed about when it will be possible to assemble in front of the hall. We thank you for your support, which touches us profoundly."

Eagles of Death Metal issued a statement about the attacks on 18 November, expressing their horror about the attacks and their sympathy with friends and family of the victims, and thanking survivors, authorities, and French and American police. White Miles offered their condolences on that day as well, saying: "We are happy, but miserable at the same time. Happy, because we are back with our families, who help immensely to make us feel safe again; miserable, because we know that many families have to mourn following the weekend." On 8 December, nearly a month after the attacks, Eagles of Death Metal revisited the Bataclan to pay their respects to the victims.

On 11 February 2016, the Bataclan management announced that the theatre would reopen later in 2016 following a renovation. The first artist scheduled to perform at the reopened club was Pete Doherty on 16 November 2016, three days after the first anniversary of the attacks; however, on 4 November 2016, the Bataclan management announced that Sting would perform an exclusive concert in Paris on 12 November 2016 for the re-opening of the Bataclan (before a maximum capacity of 1497 people including inviting a thousand members of the victims' families).

== See also ==
- Istanbul nightclub shooting
- Terrorism in France
