= Pan Anzi =

Chinese film director (born 1977)

- 潘安子
- Born: 1977 (age 48–49); Nanjing, Jiangsu
- Occupation: Film director

Pan Anzi (born 1977 in Nanjing, Jiangsu) is a Chinese film director.

== Bibilogy ==
In 1996, Pan Anzi was admitted to the Directing Department of the Central Academy of Drama and graduated in 2000.

In 2003, he directed the musical short film Goodbye Carmen; in the same year, he won the Outstanding Director Award at the 10-year Celebration of Chinese Music and Television. In 2008, he directed his first film Volunteer, for which he won the Best Potential Director Award at the Shanghai International Film Festival Media Awards. On June 28, 2009, he directed the play Causeway in the Desk.

In 2011, he directed the comedy film Scheme With Me, co-starring Ren Xianqi, Tengger, and Xiong Naijin. On August 13, 2013, he directed the romance costume film The Palace. In 2016, he wrote and directed the action-comedy film For a Few Bullets. On July 15, 2020, he directed the adventure-themed web series Reunion: The Sound of the Providence, which was broadcast on Youku and iQIYI. On February 9, 2023, directed the TV series Under the Microscope.

== Filmography ==
- Scheme with Me (2012)
- The Palace (2013)
- Crazy New Year's Eve (2015)
- For a Few Bullets (2016)
