= Ariel Wizman =

French musician (born 1962)

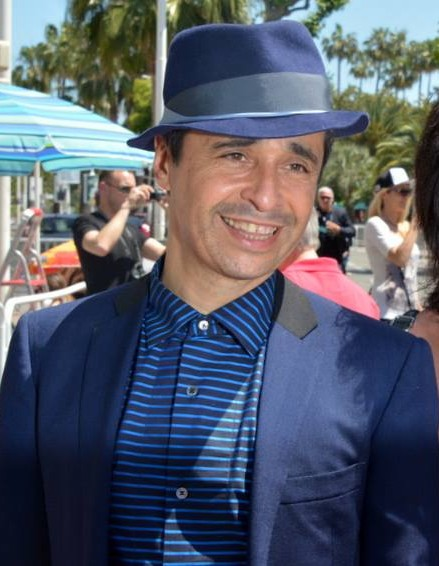
- Wizman at the 2015 Cannes Film Festival
- Born: 19 May 1962 (age 64); Casablanca, Morocco
- Occupations: Musician; DJ; journalist; actor

Ariel Wizman (born 19 May 1962) is a French musician, DJ, journalist and actor born in Casablanca, Morocco.

== Life and career ==
His family, as many Moroccan Jewish families, left Morocco after the Six-Day War and settled in France. In Paris, Wizman met the philosopher Emmanuel Lévinas and thanks to him, he attended the École Normale Israélite Orientale. At a gypsy party, he met Édouard Baer and they co-presented a radio show on Radio Nova.

Wizman has worked for Actuel, Vogue Homme and 20 Ans, and produced several programs for France Culture. In 1995, he was chief director of >Interactif and is currently a DJ.

Wizman has also appeared as a writer in Nulle part ailleurs. From September 2003 to June 2005, with Stéphane Bern, he presented Tentations.06 on Canal+.

He is half of the electronic music duo Grand Popo Football Club along with Nicolas Errèra, with an album, Shampoo Victims, released in 2000, and a second, Venom in the grass, released in February 2010.

Wizman controversially became the voice of a French Ministry of Industry campaign against internet music piracy in 2004, although he later claimed that he was misled into taking part.

In 2009, special editions of Nickel "Morning After Rescue-Gel" were produced, featuring designs showing Wizman or his initials.

== Filmography ==
- Iznogoud (2005)
- La face noire des relations publiques - documentary by Ariel Wizman broadcast on Canal+
- Les Yeux jaunes des crocodiles (2014)
