= The Butterfly (2002 film) =

- Directed by: Philippe Muyl
- Written by: Philippe Muyl
- Produced by: Patrick Godeau
- Starring: Michel Serrault; Claire Bouanich; Jacques Bouanich; Nade Dieu; Jacky Nercessian
- Cinematography: Nicolas Herdt
- Edited by: Mireille Leroy
- Music by: Nicolas Errèra
- Distributed by: Alicéléo
- Release date: 18 December 2002 (France)
- Running time: 85 minutes
- Country: France
- Language: French
- Budget: €5.2 million
- Box office: 9,680,040 €

The Butterfly (French: Le Papillon) in original French, is a French film by Philippe Muyl starring Michel Serrault and Claire Bouanich.

== Plot ==
Julien, an aging widower, is a passionate butterfly collector. Elsa, an eight-year-old girl, and her mother, a young woman named Isabelle, have just moved into his apartment building. The mother works late and varied nursing shifts, leaving her daughter alone after school. Julien gives her shelter one afternoon and explains butterflies to her but he bars her after she goes into a room he has told her is out of bounds and lets some escape.

Julien decides to go to the Vercors plateau for a week in search of a rare butterfly, Isabelle, which lives for only three days. Elsa goes along without telling him by hiding in the back of his car. He tries calling the mother and concierge but they are out. Elsa begs him not to leave her with the police, afraid that she will be returned to care. She also sabotages his cell phone. During their search, Julien reveals that his terminally ill son had asked him to find the Isabelle butterfly which is why it was so important to him.

When Isabelle cannot find Elsa, she reports her as missing and possibly kidnapped. Elsa ends up falling into a deep hole one night and Julien asks the authorities for help. The police send a rescue party but also arrest Julien as he is suspected of kidnapping Elsa.

A young boy named Sebastian helps get Elsa out of the hole and she goes home. Julien is released when the police realize that he had not kidnapped Elsa. Isabelle allows her to continue seeing Julien and studying butterflies with him. Julien, Elsa and Isabelle benefit greatly from each other's presence. When Julien and Elsa watch an unlabelled chrysalis that Julien had received hatch, they find that it contained the Isabelle butterfly all along. Julien sends the butterfly on its way to visit his deceased son.

== Cast ==
- Michel Serrault as Julien
- Claire Bouanich as Elsa
- Nade Dieu as Isabelle
- Jacques Bouanich as Sébastien's Father
- Jerry Lucas as Sébastien
- Aurélie Meriel as Amie d'Isabelle
- Gérald Maillet as SDF
- Françoise Dubois as Femme de la cabine téléphonique
- Françoise Michaud as Cafe Waitress
- Hélène Hily as Marguerite, the Concierge
- Idwig Stéphane as Entomologist (as Idwig Stephane)
- Fabien Béhar as Le gérant d'hôtel
