= The Lookout (2012 film) =

- Film poster
- French: Le Guetteur
- Italian: Il cecchino
- Directed by: Michele Placido
- Written by: Cédric Melon; Denis Brusseaux
- Produced by: Fabio Conversi
- Starring: Daniel Auteuil; Mathieu Kassovitz
- Cinematography: Arnaldo Catinari
- Music by: Nicolas Errèra
- Production company: Babe Film
- Distributed by: Studio Canal
- Release dates: 5 September 2012 (France & Belgium)
- Running time: 89 min
- Countries: France; Belgium; Italy
- Language: French
- Budget: $12.2 million
- Box office: $2 million

The Lookout (French: Le Guetteur; Italian: Il cecchino, lit. 'The Sniper') is a French-Belgian-Italian crime film from 2012, directed by Michele Placido and starring Daniel Auteuil and Mathieu Kassovitz. It marked Placido's directorial debut outside Italy, as a result of the French box office success of his 2010 film Angel of Evil.

== Synopsis ==
A Parisian police squad, laying in wait for a group of bank robbers after a tip-off, is attacked by a sniper on a rooftop when the robbers come out from the bank. Several policemen are killed and the robbers manage to escape. Chief Inspector Mattei, who led the police squad, tries to identify the sniper and interrogates a possible suspect, while the wounded robbers are treated in the countryside by a corrupt doctor who turns out to be a serial killer.

== Main cast ==
- Daniel Auteuil as Mattei
- Mathieu Kassovitz as Vincent Kaminski
- Olivier Gourmet as Franck
- Francis Renaud as Eric
- Nicolas Briançon as Meyer
- Luca Argentero as Nico
- Violante Placido as Anna
- Arly Jover as Kathy
- Christian Hecq as Gerfaut
- Sébastien Lagniez as Ryan
- Michele Placido as Giovanni
- Fanny Ardant as Giovanni's wife
- Géraldine Martineau as Sonia
