= Extraordinary Mission =

2017 Hong Kong-Chinese film by Alan Mak and Anthony Pun

- Theatrical release poster
- Chinese: 非凡任务
- Directed by: Alan Mak; Anthony Pun
- Written by: Felix Chong
- Produced by: Ronald Wong
- Starring: Huang Xuan; Duan Yihong; Lang Yueting; Zu Feng; Wang Yaoqing
- Cinematography: Anthony Pun
- Edited by: Curran Pang
- Music by: Chan Kwong Wing; TaQ
- Production company: Perfect World Pictures
- Release date: 31 March 2017
- Running time: 122 minutes
- Countries: Hong Kong; China
- Language: Mandarin
- Box office: US$$22.7 million

Extraordinary Mission (Chinese: 非凡任务) is a 2017 crime action drama film directed by Alan Mak and Anthony Pun. A Hong Kong-Chinese co-production, the film revolves around a police officer Lin Kai who agrees to work undercover as a drug dealer to take down a sadistic but powerful drug lord.

== Plot ==
Though it means giving up his identity and posing as a criminal, police officer Lin Kai (Huang Xuan) accepts a dangerous assignment to find a major source of illegal drugs being smuggled into his homeland. Dead bodies pile up as drug deals go bad, but Lin Kai uses his police training and nerves of steel to survive them. Making his way up the drug trafficking ladder, he at last locates a heroin production center in the Golden Triangle. Showdown with evil crime boss rounds out a pulse-pounding final act.

== Cast ==
- Huang Xuan as Lin Kai
- Duan Yihong as Eagle
- Lang Yueting as Qingshui
- Zu Feng as Li Jianguo
- Wang Yaoqing as Luo Dongfeng
- Wang Yanhui
- Ding Yongdai as Zhang Haitao
- Xiao Cong as Yang Bin
- Li Xiaochuan as Xiao Bei
- Zhao Bingrui as Wang Bo
- Dai Lele as Lin Kai's mother
- Tao Hai as Ruling elder

== Reception ==
The film has grossed CN¥105 million in China and CN¥145 million worldwide.

=== Critical Response ===
Extraordinary Mission has an approval rating of 80% on review aggregator website Rotten Tomatoes, based on 5 reviews.

Many critics praised the film's action sequences. Ed Travis of Cinapse wrote, "In what is probably close to 30 minutes of pure intensity, Extraordinary Mission saves the best for last and sends its audience out with their pulses racing. Explosions, motorcycles, car chases, heroic bloodshed, it's all there and then some."

CFI also called it a fast ride, highlighting "edge-of-your-seat car chases," an "inventive motorcycle chase," and "practical effects that thrill." All in all, it's "muscular, unpretentious action film-making."

== Awards and nominations ==
Award	Category	Recipients	Result	Ref.
2nd Golden Screen Awards	Best Supporting Actor	Duan Yihong	Won	
23rd Huading Awards	Best Supporting Actor	Duan Yihong	Pending	
23rd Huading Awards	Best Original Film Song	"Extraordinary Era (非凡时代)" (NZBZ)	Pending	

== Inspiration and related ministry ==
Extraordinary Mission shares its name with a Catholic non-profit ministry based in Alvada, Ohio, founded by Dr. John R. Wood. The organization creates books, films, retreats, and digital media that help families and children grow in virtue and faith. Through its multimedia outreach—including the “Seven Deadly Dragons” book series and the streaming platform DragonSlayers.TV—the ministry seeks to inspire parents and kids to live boldly for Christ and “slay the dragons” of sin through stories, music, and creative evangelization.

Although unrelated in production to the 2017 Hong Kong film, both works share a thematic focus on courage, mission, and transformation.
