= Adoring =

2019 film directed by Larry Yang

- Film poster
- Traditional Chinese: 寵愛
- Simplified Chinese: 宠爱
- Literal meaning: Adoring
- Hanyu Pinyin: Chǒng'ài
- Directed by: Larry Yang
- Written by: Larry Yang; Ran Jianan
- Produced by: Xu Zheng
- Starring: Yu Hewei; Li Landi; Leo Wu; Zhang Zifeng; Wallace Chung; Yang Zishan; William Chan; Zhong Chuxi; Tan Jianci; Kan Qingzi
- Cinematography: Ma Man-Nang
- Edited by: Super Zhang
- Music by: Nicolas Errèra
- Production companies: Beijing Hairun Pictures Company; Beijing Joy Leader Culture Commmunication
- Distributed by: China Media Capital
- Release date: 31 December 2019
- Running time: 108 minutes
- Country: China
- Language: Mandarin
- Box office: US$99.6 million

Adoring (Chinese: 宠爱) is a 2019 Chinese ensemble romantic comedy-drama film directed by Larry Yang and produced by Xu Zheng. It tells 6 heartwarming stories of how people interact with their pets to discover love in their lives. Principal photography began in April 2019 in China and it was released in China on 31 December 2019. It was subsequently released internationally in North America, Australia, New Zealand, the United Kingdom, Singapore and Japan from January 2020.

== Synopsis ==
Gao Ming is a single father who lives alone with a cat after being estranged from his wife and daughter, he tries to connect with the latter when she returns for a vacation. Chen Leyun is a student who becomes blind after an illness and his classmate Jiang Nan tries to help him by training her pet to be his guide-dog. Li Xiang tries to hide his pet pig from his girlfriend Qu Feifei, but to no avail when she moves into his apartment. Zhao Le and Fang Xin is a newly married couple who finds their attempts at consummating their marriage being hilariously thwarted repeatedly by her pet dog. Luo Hua gets his neighbour An Ying's help to get care of a stray cat, not knowing her obsession with cleanliness. Ah De has the help of a stray dog when he loses his way delivering food to the apartment, and ends up helping it to find a new home eventually.

== Cast ==
=== Main cast ===
- Yu Hewei as Gao Ming, a single father
- Li Landi as Gao Mengmeng, Gao Ming's daughter
- Leo Wu as Chen Leyun, a blind student
- Zhang Zifeng as Jiang Nan, Leyun's classmate
- Wallace Chung as Li Xiang, a stock broker
- Yang Zishan as Qu Feifei, Li Xiang's girlfriend
- William Chan as Zhao Le, a graphic designer
- Zhong Chuxi as Fang Xin, an air stewardess, Zhao Le's wife
- Tan Jianci as Luo Hua, an animal lover
- Kan Qingzi as An Ying, Luo Hua's neighbour
- Guo Qilin as Ah De, a food-delivery worker

=== Supporting cast ===
- Gong Beibi as Gao's Ex-wife
- Zhao Yunzhuo as young Fang Xin
- Li Qian
- Lang Yueting
- Yu Ailei
- Wang Ziyi
- ONER

== Soundtrack ==
No.	Title	Performer	Length
1.	"Adoring 宠爱"	Leo Wu, Zhang Zifeng, Wallace Chung, Yang Zishan, William Chan, Zhong Chuxi, Tan Jianci, Kan Qingzi, Guo Qilin, Li Landi	3:13
2.	"Happy New Year 新年快乐"	William Chan	3:40
3.	"Because of Adoring 因为宠爱"	Jin Wenqi	3:50

== Awards and nominations ==
Award	Category	Recipients	Result
8th Vancouver Chinese Film Festival	Best New Director	Larry Yang	Won
8th Vancouver Chinese Film Festival	Popularity Award	Leo Wu, Guo Qilin	Won
8th Vancouver Chinese Film Festival	Most Popular Actor	Wallace Chung, William Chan	Won
8th Vancouver Chinese Film Festival	Most Popular Actress	Zhong Chuxi	Won
