= Sorry, I Love You =

- Film poster
- Directed by: Larry Yang
- Written by: Larry Yang
- Based on: I'm Sorry, I Love You by Lee Kyung-hee
- Produced by: Cao Zhongmin; Victoria Hon; Lu Hongshi; Wang Huifang; Wei Jian; Wu Yakang; Yang Yue; Zhao Zhijiang; Liu Zhenfei
- Cinematography: Cliff Hokanson
- Edited by: Super Zhang
- Production companies: Beijing Hairun Pictures Co., Ltd; Huaxia Film Distribution Co., Ltd; China Movie Channel SARFT; Beijing Jiuzhou Shengshi Media Co., Ltd; Beijing Tianrun Hengchuang Co., Ltd; Beijing Dazhong Mingtian Media Co., Ltd; Beijing Hairun Huaxia Film Production Co., Ltd; Tianjin Xinyue Film Media Co., Ltd
- Release date: 3 January 2014 (China)
- Running time: 105 minutes
- Country: China
- Languages: Mandarin; English
- Box office: ¥2.79 million (China)

Sorry, I Love You (Chinese: 对不起，我爱你) is a 2014 Chinese romantic drama film directed by Larry Yang. It was released in China on January 3, 2014.

== Plot ==
With a bullet lodged in his head that no doctor could remove, Walker's only got 6 months to live. So he packs up and leaves Canada to venture back to China and find his biological family.

== Cast ==
- Vivian Dawson
- Swan Wen
- Wang Ji
- Wu Yujuan
- Wesley Wong
- Jade Lin

== Reception ==
The film earned ¥2.79 million at the Chinese box office.
