= For a Few Bullets =

- Poster
- Chinese: 快手枪手快枪手
- Directed by: Pan Anzi
- Written by: Pan Anzi; Zhou Zhiyong
- Produced by: Cao Tony; Cao Wenhua; Lu Hongshi
- Starring: Lin Gengxin; Zhang Jingchu; Liu Xiaoqing
- Production companies: Wanda Media; Huace Pictures (Tianjing); Beijing Heaven Culture Development; China Vision Yiyang (Beijing) Culture; Beijing Lehua Yuanyu Media; Zhejiang HG Entertainment; Beijing Gaodeng World Entertainment
- Distributed by: Wanda Shengshi Film Distribution
- Release date: July 15, 2016 (China)
- Running time: 90 minutes
- Country: China
- Language: Mandarin
- Budget: US$14 million
- Box office: CN¥53 million

For a Few Bullets is a 2016 Chinese comedy western film directed by Peter Pan Anzi and starring Lin Gengxin, Zhang Jingchu and Liu Xiaoqing. It was released in China by Wanda Shengshi Film Distribution in IMAX on July 15, 2016.

== Plot ==
When a professional thief sees his lifetime goal of being the best potentially realized in stealing a rare artifact, he finds himself entangled in a worldwide plot involving the Soviets, the Japanese, and a band of outsiders. Him and his agents now have to save the world.

== Cast ==
- Lin Gengxin
- Zhang Jingchu
- Tengger
- Liu Xiaoqing
- Vivian Dawson
- Kenneth Tsang
- Vicky Chen
- Shi Yufei

== Production ==
The film has a budget of US$14 million.

== Reception ==
The film has grossed CN¥53 million at the Chinese box office.
