= Abraham Danon =

Turkish rabbi and writer

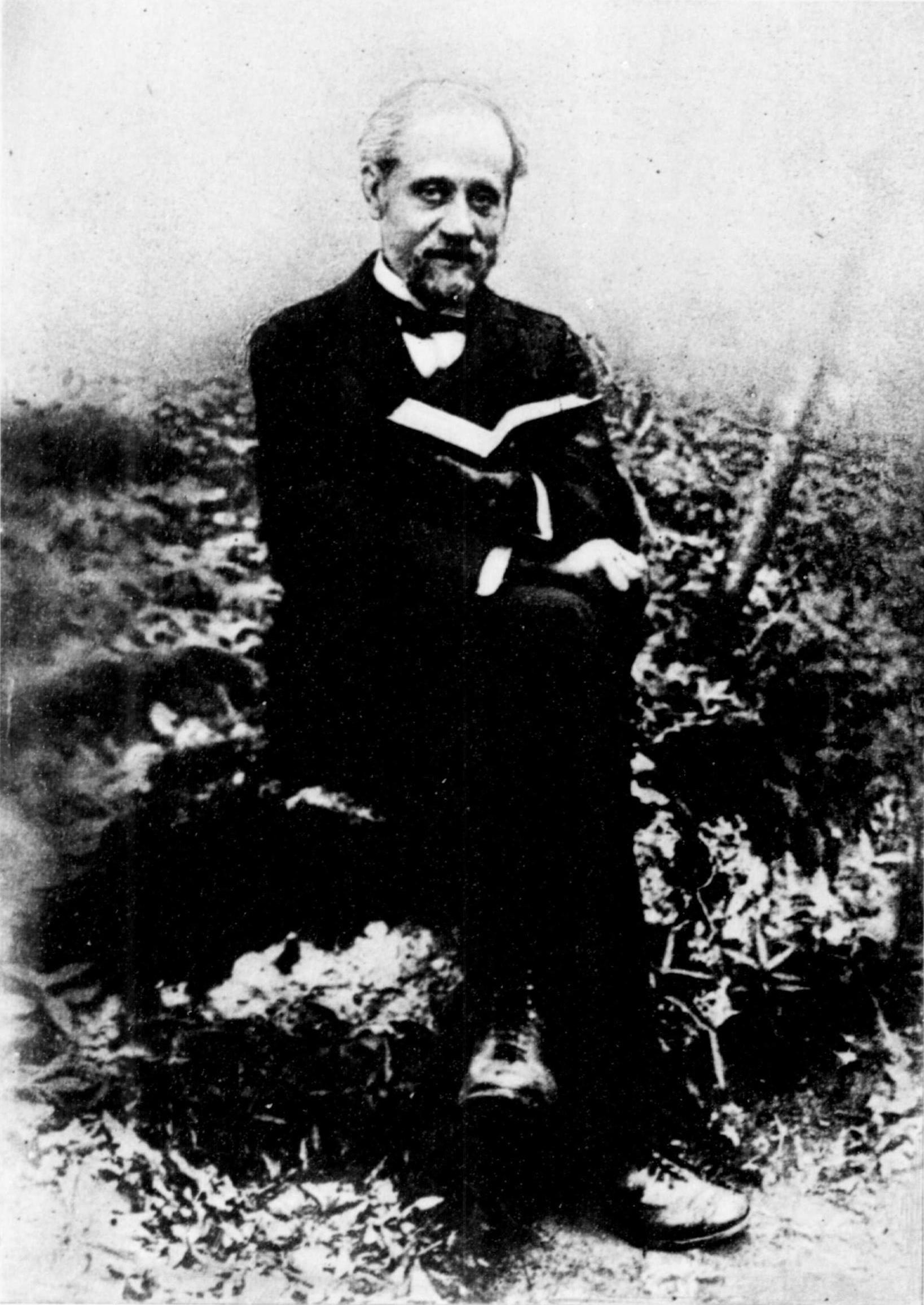
- Born: 15 August 1857; Adrianople, Ottoman Empire
- Died: 22 April 1925 (aged 67); Paris, France
- Writing career
- Movement: Haskalah

Abraham Danon (Hebrew: אברהם בן יוסף שמואל דאנון; 15 August 1857 – 22 April 1925) was a Turkish rabbi, Hebraist, writer, and poet.

== Biography ==
Abraham Danon was born into a rabbinical family in Adrianople, Turkey, in 1857. He attended the Talmud Torah in that city, pursuing his Talmudic studies at a yeshiva. In 1879 he founded the Maskilic society Ḥevrat Shoḥare Tushiyya ('Society of the Proponents of Wisdom'), also known as Dorshe ha-Haskala ('Seekers of Enlightenment'), which promoted the study of Jewish literature and history. After having presided over a small seminary at Adrianople, in 1897 he was appointed director of the rabbinical seminary founded by the Alliance Israélite Universelle in Constantinople. That same year, he went to Paris to represent Oriental Jewry at the Congress of Orientalists.

Danon moved to Paris, France, in August 1917, and began teaching at that city's École normale israélite orientale. He died there in 1925.

== Work ==
Under the title Toledot bene Abraham, Danon published a Hebrew translation of Théodore Reinach's Histoire des juifs (Presburg, 1888), completing the story, as he says in the preface, by extracts from Graetz, Geiger, Kalman Schulman, and others. Under the title Maskil le-Edan ('Edan's Poem', abbreviation of 'Abraham Josef Danon'), he published a series of Hebrew translations of the poems of Virgil, Victor Hugo, and Saadi, together with some original contributions (Adrianople, 1888).

Danon's main achievement was his initiative in founding at Adrianople in 1888 the historical review Yosef da'at, or El Progresso, which was published in Hebrew characters in Judæo-Spanish, Hebrew, and Turkish. The aim of the review was to collect all the documents relating to the history of the Oriental Jews. But the Ottoman government censorship suppressed this review, together with all others published in Turkey.

Danon published a collection of fifty-five Judæo-Spanish ballads which are sung in Turkey, each ballad being accompanied by its French translation. They first appeared in the Revue des études juives, and were published separately by Durlacher in Paris in 1896. Danon also published some studies on the Jews of Adrianople and of Salonica, which appeared in the same review.

== Partial bibliography ==
- Toledot bene Avraham; o, Korot ha-Yehudim mi-yom ḥurban Bayit Sheni ʻad ha-yom ha-zeh. Romanized title on cover:Toldoth b'ne Abram (in Hebrew). Pressburg: Defus shel David Levi ve-shuttaso Avraham Alkalai. 1887.
- "Ma naʻaseh le-aḥotenu". Ha-tzefira (poem) (in Hebrew). 16 (207). September 25, 1889.
- "Étude historique sur les impôts directs et indirects des communautés israélites en Turquie". Revue des études juives (in French). 31 (61): 52–61. 1895.
- "Recueil de romances judéo-espagnoles chantées en Turquie". Revue des études juives (in French). 32 (63–66). 1896.
- Maskil le-Edan (in Hebrew). Adrianople: Hotsaʼat Ḥevrat shoḥare tushiyah. 1888.
- "Une secte judéo-musulmane en Turquie". Revue des études juives (in French). 35 (70): 264–281. 1897.
- "Documents et traditions sur Sabbataï Cevi et sa secte". Revue des études juives (in French). 37 (73): 103–110. 1898.
- Les superstitions des Juifs ottomans (in French). Paris: Imprimerie nationale. 1899.
- "La Communauté juive de Salonique au XVIe siècle". Revue des études juives (in French). 40 (80–82). 1900.
- "Essai sur les vocables turcs dans le judéo-espagnol". A Magyar Neprajzi Tarsasag Keleti Szakosztalyanak Kiadvanyai (in French). 3. Budapest. 1904.
- "Quelques Pourim locaux". Revue des études juives (in French). 54 (107): 113–137. 1907.
- "Études sabbatiennes, nouveaux documents sur Sabbataï Cevi et son entourage". Revue des études juives (in French). 58 (116): 270–291. 1909.
- "Kinor Tziyyon". Ha-ḥerut (poem) (in Hebrew). 1: 3–5. July 2, 1909.
- "Amulettes sabbatiennes". Journal Asiatique (in French). XV (2). Paris: Imprimerie nationale: 331–341. March–April 1910.
- "Notice sur la littérature gréco-caraïte". Revue des études juives (in French). 64 (127): 147–151. 1912.
- Contributions à l'histoire des sultans Osman II et Mouctafa (in French). Paris: Imprimerie nationale. 1919.
- "Un hymne hébréo-grec". Revue des études juives (in French). 75 (149): 89–92. 1922.
- "Les éléments grecs dans le judéo-espagnol". Revue des études juives (in French). 75 (150): 211–216. 1922.
- Danon, Abraham (January 1925). "The Karaites in European Turkey. Contributions to Their History Based Chiefly on Unpublished Documents". The Jewish Quarterly Review. 15 (3): 285–360. doi:10.2307/1451584. JSTOR 1451584.
