= Grand Popo Football Club =

- Origin: France
- Genres: French house; electro house; pop
- Occupation: DJ
- Years active: 1996–2010
- Labels: Pschent Music
- Past members: Ariel Wizman; Nicolas Errèra
- Website: Official MySpace

Grand Popo Football Club was a French electronic music group of DJ Ariel Wizman and classically trained musician Nicolas Errèra.

The duo adopted their moniker after Ariel Wizman visited Grand-Popo in Benin to film a television programme and decided that the community was missing a football club. After studying piano, composition, and electronic music, Nicolas Errèra became involved in theatre and successfully directed short films (winning the Clermont-Ferrand prize in 1991, for his Going to Dieppe Without Seeing the Sea) as well as becoming half of pop duo 2 Source. Wizman, meanwhile, DJed at Colombian parties in Paris. He became renowned for his show on Radio Nova that mixed easy listening, soundtracks, and electronic music. When the show transferred to television, Wizman brought in guests as disparate as Johnny Rotten and German philosophers: fortuitously, his guests also included 2 Source, an invite that rekindled Wizman and Errera's previous friendship.

GPFC's first recording appeared on the Source Lab 3 compilation in 1996, but they did not release their debut, Shampoo Victims, until 2000 (the album was re-released two years later). The duo's biggest hit was "Men Are Not Nice Guys", the English version of their 2001 song "Les hommes c'est pas des mecs bien", which charted in Australia and the UK.

Together the duo creates Gallic pop that seems to revere and revile the music of peers such as Daft Punk, Air, and Cassius in equal measure. They dubbed a song that sounded curiously like the former "One More Song on the Market", while "Nothing to Say in a House Song" railed against the duo's perceived vacuousness in house music by (vacuously) repeating the title with no other lyrics. Shampoo Victims also included a duo of collaborations with friends/heroes Sparks. Russell and Ron Mael provide both lyrics and vocals on the album's tracks "La nuit est là" (The Night Is Here) and "Yo quiero mas dinero" (I Want More Money). As if to accentuate this fondness for '70s/'80s pop, the duo also sampled Giorgio Moroder's "Love Fever" on "Each Finger Has an Attitude". The group has not been active since 2010.

== Discography ==
=== Albums ===
- Shampoo Victims (2000)
- Venom in the Grass (2010)

=== Singles ===
List of singles, with selected chart positions
Title	Year	Peak chart positions		
Title	Year	FRA	AUS	UK
"Each Finger Has an Attitude"	1999	—	—	—
"Les hommes c'est pas des mecs bien"	2001	77	—	—
"Arab Skank"	2001	—	—	—
"Men Are Not Nice Guys"	2002	—	32	111
"My Territory"	2008	—	—	—
"Les Filles"	2009	—	—	—
