= Eugène Manuel =

French poet and man of letters

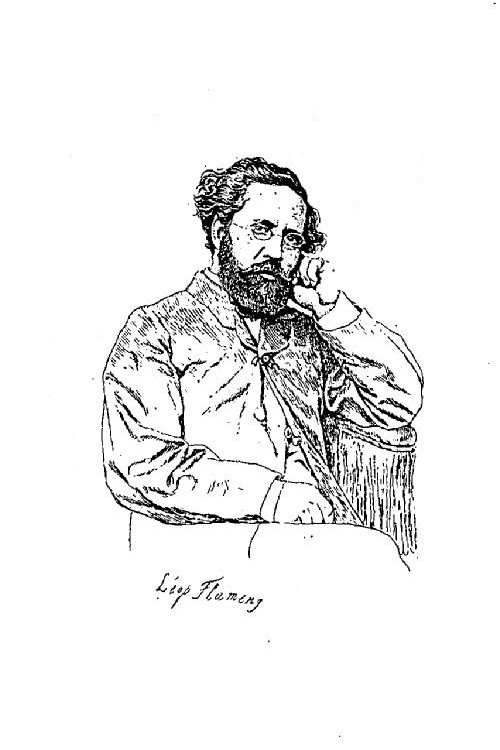
Portrait of Eugene Manuel

Eugène Manuel (13 July 1823 – 1901), French poet and man of letters.

== Life ==
He was born in Paris, the son of a Jewish doctor.

He was educated at the Ecole Normale, and taught rhetoric for some years in provincial schools and then in Paris. In 1870 he entered the department of public instruction, and in 1878 became inspector-general. His works include:

- Pages intimés (1866), which received a prize from the Academy
- Poèmes populaires (1874)
- Pendant la guerre (1871)
- Patriotic poems, which were forbidden in Alsace-Lorraine by the German authorities
- En voyage (1881), poems
- La France (4 vols, 1854-1858)
- A schoolbook written in collaboration with his brother-in-law, Abraham Ernest Lévi Alvarès
- Les Ouvriers (1870), a drama dealing with social questions, which was crowned by the Academy
- L'Absent (1873), a comedy
- Poésies dufoyer et de l'école (1889), and editions of the works of JB Rousseau (1852) and André Chénier (1884).

He died in Paris in 1901.

His Poésies completes (2 vols, 1899) contained some fresh poems; to his Mélanges en prose (Paris, 1905) is prefixed an introductory note by A Cahen.
