= Ride On (film) =

2023 Chinese action drama film by Larry Yang

- Theatrical release poster
- Traditional Chinese: 龍馬精神
- Simplified Chinese: 龙马精神
- Hanyu Pinyin: Lóng mǎ jīng shén
- Directed by: Larry Yang
- Written by: Larry Yang
- Produced by: Fu Ruoqing; Victoria Hon; Jerry Li; Belle Lau; Nong Yuan; Xu Tianfu; Zhang Huixia
- Starring: Jackie Chan; Liu Haocun; Guo Qilin
- Cinematography: Sun Ming
- Edited by: Super Zhang
- Music by: Lao Zai
- Production companies: Alibaba Pictures; Beijing HaiRun Pictures; Hengdian Group; China Film
- Distributed by: Shanghai Pictures
- Release dates: April 7, 2023 (China); April 13, 2023 (Malaysia)
- Running time: 126 minutes
- Country: China
- Language: Mandarin
- Box office: $36.3 million

Ride On (Chinese: 龙马精神) is a 2023 Chinese action comedy film written and directed by Larry Yang. The film stars Jackie Chan, Liu Haocun, Guo Qilin, and Wu Jing. The film tells a story of an old-school stunt performer and his stunt horse. The film was released in China on April 7, 2023.

== Plot ==
Lao Luo is a prolific stuntman who works with his Red Hare, his deformed-at-birth stunt horse who he saved from euthanasia. His life is falling apart - he had suffered a serious injury that sent him bankrupt 8 years ago and lost the custody of his daughter, Xiao Bao, after divorcing his late wife while she was still young. One night, Lao and Red Hare get into a fight with debt collectors and they soon learn Red Hare is at risk of being auctioned after their original company went bankrupt. Lao seeks legal help from Bao, now a university student studying law, and despite being reluctant at first, she offers him the services of her boyfriend, Naihua.

Meanwhile, after Lao's fight with the debt collectors goes viral, he and Red Hare are hired for several films, with Bao becoming his agent ad litem. Although they are able to help each other during tough situations, Bao soon expresses discomfort at Lao's stunt work, fearing that he and Red Hare might suffer dangerous injuries. After Lao embarrasses Bao in front of Naihua's parents, she leaves him in disgust. Afterwards, Lao and Red Hare get seriously injured during a stunt and as a result, Lao is sent to the hospital. While searching Lao's home for an ID card, Bao learns that he has saved CCTV footage of a failed meeting he had with her when she was younger. A touched Bao reconciles with Lao at the hospital, and Lao promises to stop doing stunt work.

On one night, Lao wakes up to witness the debt collectors trying to steal Red Hare; after a brief confrontation, he pays his debt and invites Dami Ge, the leading debt-collecting thug, to become one of his disciples. The next day, Yuanjie, Lao's apprentice, invites him for a role in his film which pays homage to stunt work - Lao accepts as a final job, to Bao's dismay. Whilst filming, Lao insists on performing a dangerous stunt himself, but is unable to finish it after remembering Bao's words and quits the job. Despite being able to reconcile with Bao once again, Lao loses Red Hare's case, and is forced to sell him to a company. Refusing to leave them torn apart, Bao and Naihua convince the company's CEO, He Xin, to return Red Hare and show him footage of Lao's previous stunt work to display his dedication to his work. He Xin returns Red Hare to Lao, explaining that he intended to return the horse already - Red Hare had attempted to starve himself while being owned by the company. He Xin leaves as Lao, Bao, and Naihua reunite with Red Hare.

== Cast ==
- Jackie Chan as Lao Luo, an old-school stunt performer who has a stunt horse named Red Hare (赤兔)
- Liu Haocun as Xiao Bao, the daughter of Lao Luo
- Guo Qilin as Naihua, the boyfriend of Xiao Bao
- Wu Jing as Yuanjie, the apprentice of Lao Luo
- Joey Yung as Yingzi, a female stunt performer and the apprentice of Lao Luo
- Yu Ailei as Xiamao, the husband of Yingzi
- Yu Rongguang as He Xin, a company CEO who covets Lao Luo's horse
- Andy On as Dami Ge, a thug working for debt collectors
- Xiaoshenyang as Li Yan, a lawyer working for He Xin
- Shi Yanneng as Dawei, a stunt performer and a friend of Lao Luo

== Production ==
=== Development ===
Director Larry Yang is a fan of Jackie Chan and wrote the screenplay after watching a documentary about Kung Fu Stuntmen (龙虎武师). Firstly, Larry looked for Chan to check his screenplay but got declined and was asked to revise it in months. Yang took five days to have the revision completed and sent it to Chan once again where he accepted the filming invitation.

=== Filming ===
Principal photography began on September 27, 2021, and concluded on November 10, 2022. Filming took place in Hengdian World Studios, Dongyang and the Pegasus Watertown, Jiangyin.

== Release ==
The film was released in the United Kingdom, United States and China on April 7, 2023, and released in Malaysia on April 13, 2023.

== See also ==
- Jackie Chan filmography
