= Nicolas Errèra =

French composer (born 1967)

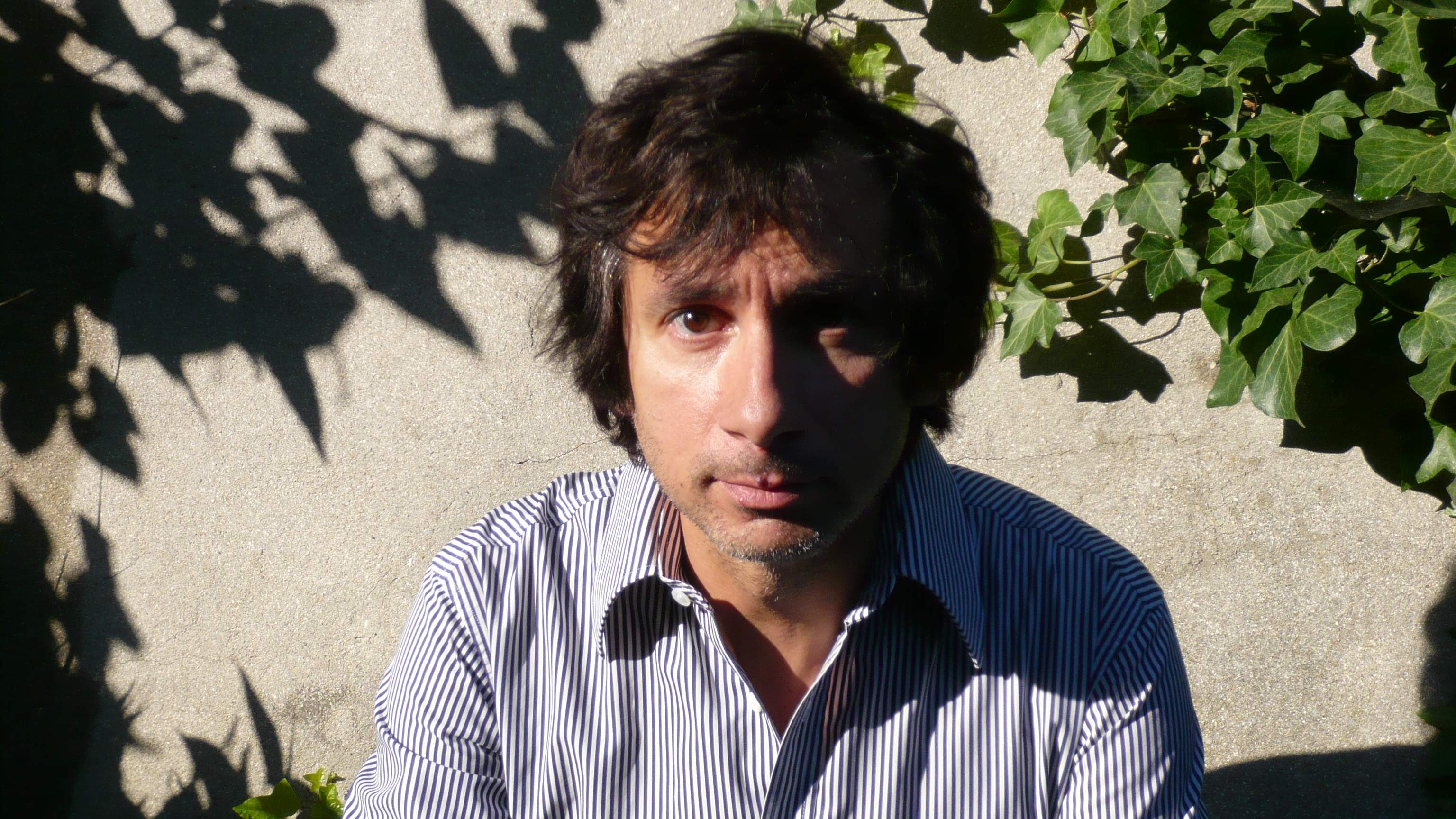

Background information
- Born: May 21, 1967 (age 59); Paris, France
- Genres: Film score, electronic music
- Occupations: Composer, pianist, producer
- Instruments: Piano, percussion, keyboard
- Years active: 1998–present
- Formerly of: Grand Popo Football Club
- Website: www.nicolaserrera.com

Nicolas Errèra (born 21 May 1967) is a French composer and musician working all over the world. Co-founder of innovative electronics groups Grand Popo Football Club and Rouge Rouge, he also composes soundtracks for films and television.

== Early life ==
Nicolas Errèra comes from a family of artists. An only child, his father is a playwright and his mother a set designer. He was born in Paris.

He majored in science to attain his baccalaureate and also studied philosophy. When he was a teenager he joined the group of the English theatre director Peter Brook, under whom he featured in 3 plays. Alongside his studies he took lessons in piano and composing at the École normale de musique de Paris, studying under Serge Petigirard (piano) and Max Deutsch (composing). Here he was awarded his first prize for composing. He also studied Harmony and Counterpoint with the composer Jeannine Richer.

In 1998 he set up the electro pop group Grand Popo Football Club and in 2002 he created the group Rouge Rouge. Both groups went on to be associated with the French touch.

== Career ==
=== Cinema ===
He has written music for more than 60 French and international films, including Au nom de ma fille, Sleepless Night by Frédéric Jardin, The Extraordinary Journey of the Fakir, Sticky Fingers by the Canadian filmmaker Ken Scott, The Lookout by the Italian director Michele Placido. Nocturna by Spain's Victor Maldonado and Adrian Garcia, and The Butterfly with Michel Serrault. In 2008 the success in China of the film The Butterfly (which was watched by more than 10 million people) led to a meeting with the Hong Kong director Benny Chan. This paved the way for him to work in Asian movies, as he composed the soundtracks for three of Chan's films – The White Storm, Shaolin and Connected. In 2015, he composed the music for Mountain Cry directed by Larry Yang (closing film at Busan International Film Festival). In 2018, he composed the music for the movie Hidden Man directed by Jiang Wen. Hidden Man has been chosen by China as its nominee for Best Foreign Language Film at the 91st Academy Awards. In 2024, he composed the music for the movie Serpent's Path directed by Kiyoshi Kurosawa.

In 2022 he received a Canadian Screen Award nomination for Best Original Song at the 10th Canadian Screen Awards for "Drop the Rock", a song he cowrote with Craig Walker for the 2021 film Goodbye Happiness (Au revoir le bonheur).

=== Television ===
As with his work for the cinema, Errèra wrote the music for fictional TV series such as XIII: The Conspiracy, XIII: The Series the French-Canadian series adapted from the graphic novels by William Vance and Jean Van Hamme. He also wrote music for television movies for Alain Tasma, and many more. In 2017 Ne m'abandonne pas won an International Emmy Awards Best TV Movie/Mini-Series. In 2006 Errèra met the photographer and director Jean-Baptiste Mondino, with whom he regularly collaborates on music for promotional films for prestigious brands (including Yves Saint Laruent, Chanel, Christian Dior SE, Givenchy and many more).

=== Theatre ===
In 2008 Errèra met John Malkovich. He composed the music for two productions directed by the American, namely: Good Canary by Zach Helm, directed by John Malkovich in the Théâtre Comedia (awarded the 2008 Molière prize for best director), and, in 2012, Les Liaisons Dangereuses, directed by John Malkovich in the Théâtre de l'Atelier in Paris. The production has also a limited engagement in July 2013 at the Lincoln Center for the Performing Arts in New York City.

=== Radio ===
In 1999 he met Jean-François Bizot, the founder of Actuel magazine and Radio Nova. Since 2004 he has been producing and hosting a programme on Radio Nova entitled Le Pudding (every Sunday from 8pm).

== Selected filmography ==
- The Butterfly - 2002
- Die Straße - 2004 (composition of an original music for the silent movie directed by Karl Grune in 1923)
- Nocturna - 2007
- Connected - 2008
- XIII: The Conspiracy - 2008
- Sticky Fingers - 2009
- Sleepless Night - 2011
- XIII: The Series - 2011-2012
- Shaolin - 2012
- Le Guetteur - 2013
- The White Storm - 2013
- Mountain Cry - 2016
- Au nom de ma fille - 2016
- Ne m'abandonne pas - 2016
- La Confession - 2017
- My Other Home - 2017
- The Extraordinary Journey of the Fakir - 2018
- Hidden Man - 2018
- Raging Fire - 2021
- Goodbye Happiness (Au revoir le bonheur) - 2021
- Ma Nuit - 2021
- Serpent's Path - 2024
- Once Upon My Mother (Ma mère, Dieu et Sylvie Vartan) - 2025
- The Shadow's Edge - 2025

== Awards and nominations ==
=== Awards ===
- 2017 Jerry Goldsmith Awards 2017 - Best Music Award for the movie "Mountain Cry"
- 2016 Award Ucmf 2016 - Best Music Award for the movie "Ne m'abandonne pas"
- 2014 Best Music Award (Golden Deer) - Changchun China Film Festival for the movie The White Storm

=== Nominations ===
- 2021 Les Lauriers de l'Audiovisuel. Best Original Music for the tv serie "Le Mensonge"
- 2022 Best Original Song at the 10th Canadian Screen Awards for "Drop the Rock".

== Selected discography ==
Grand Popo Football Club

- Venom in the grass (Pschent) (2010)
- My Territory featuring Tania Bruna-Rosso (Pschent) (2008)
- Men Are Not Nice Guys (Atmosphériques) (2002)
- Shampoo Victims (Atmosphériques) (2000)
- Each Finger Has An Attitude (Atmosphériques) (1999)

RougeRouge

- Ce soir, après diner (Wagram) (2003)
- Hôtel Costes, Vol. 5 (Wagram) (2002)
- L'amour (Wagram) (2002)

Soundtrack

- The Serpent's Path (Enka) (2024)
- Ma Nuit (Enka) (2022)
- Hidden Man (Soundtrack Magazine) (2022)
- Mountain Cry (Music-Box / ENKA) (2021)
- The Extraordinary Journey of the Fakir (Enka) (2018)
- La Confession (Enka) (2017)
- Mountain Cry (Enka) (2016)
- Au nom de ma fille (LGM/Noodles) (2016)
- The White Storm (Enka) (2014)
- Sleepless Night (Moviescoremedia) (2011)
- Shaolin, (Moviescoremedia MMS-11018) (2011)
- Nocturna (Milan/Universal)
- L'Outremangeur, (Milan/Universal) (2002)
- Cravate Club (East-West/Warner) (2002)
- The Butterfly (Universal) (2002)
- Les Frères Sœur (APC) (2000)

Remix

- Remix of the soundtrack Le Samouraï (Universal)

Theatre

- Les Liaisons dangereuses (Enka -12001]) (2011)
