= Tiny Times (disambiguation) =

Tiny Times may refer to:

- Tiny Times (franchise)
  - Tiny Times, 2013 Chinese film
  - Tiny Times 2, 2013 Chinese film
  - Tiny Times 3, 2014 Chinese film
  - Tiny Times 4, 2015 Chinese film
  - Tiny Times (TV series), 2014 Chinese TV series

== See also ==
- Guo Jingming, Chinese writer who created the franchise (including novels and manga)
