= Adam Tsuei =

- 崔震東
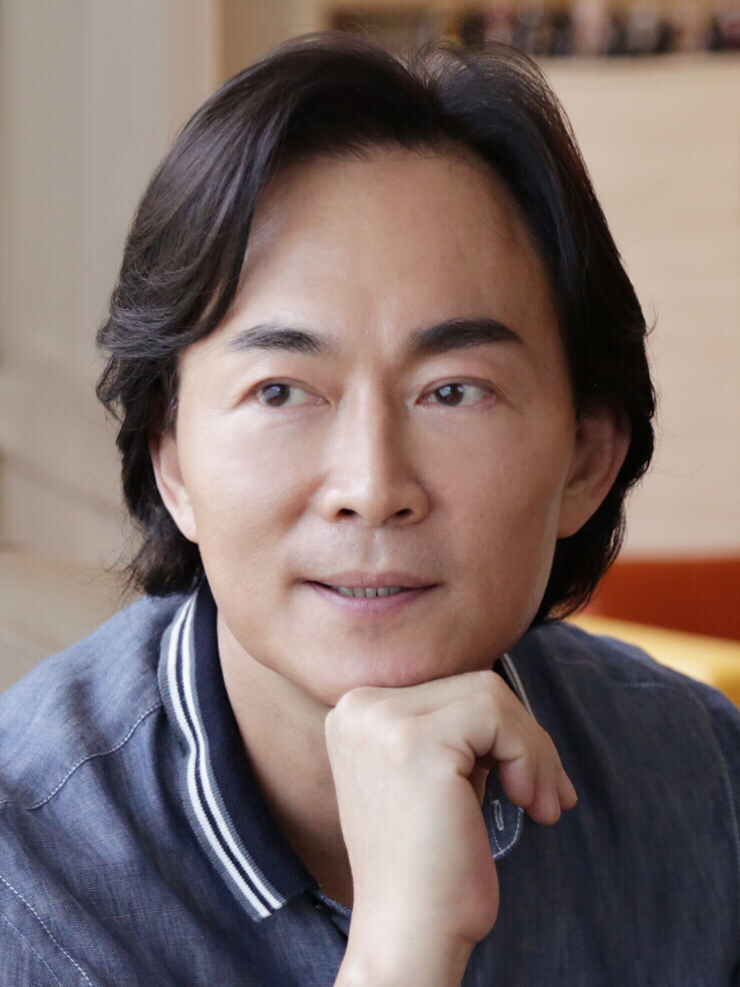
- Born: 26 October 1959
- Education: Tunghai University (LLB); University of California, Riverside (MBA); National Taiwan University of Arts (MFA)
- Occupations: Entrepreneur, film producer, film director
- Known for: BMG Music Entertainment; Sony Music Entertainment; You Are the Apple of My Eye; Tiny Times; Tiny Times 2 Café. Waiting. Love; The Tenants Downstairs

Adam Tsuei (Chinese: 崔震東; pinyin: Cuī Zhèndōng; Wade–Giles: Jehn Dung Tsuei; born 26 October 1959) is a Taiwanese entrepreneur, film producer, and director. He was the former president of Sony Music Entertainment in the Greater China Region and Group Managing Director of BMG Music Entertainment Pan China. He introduced and popularized super idols as Jay Chou, Leehom Wang, F4 and Jolin Tsai.

Between 2011 and 2021, Tsuei served as founding chairman of the Taiwan Association For Virtual and Augmented Reality (TAVAR) and also led Amazing Film Studio as founder and CEO. In 2011, with the legendary combination of Angie Chai and Giddens Ko, he successfully brought to market You Are the Apple of My Eye, a romantic comedy that became an overwhelming success in Chinese-speaking countries and communities across the world. In 2013, he released the films Tiny Times and Tiny Times 2 and led producing, marketing, and distributing efforts; both editions quickly rose to prominence across mainland China, Taiwan, and Hong Kong. In 2014, he introduced Café. Waiting. Love, another widely acclaimed romantic comedy. In 2016, as a director and producer, Tsuei released “The Tenants Downstairs,” adapted from Giddens Ko’s original novel and featuring a thriller with elements of black humor, fantasy, and mystery.

In 2024, Tsuei cofounded Wavv, a generative AI music company in San Francisco, CA.

== Career ==
January 2012–Present Amazing Film Studio, Founder & CEO

July 2001 - October 2011 Sony Music Entertainment, President, Greater China

July 1997 - June 2001 BMG Music Entertainment, Managing Director, Pan China Region

December 1994 - June 1997 CTN, Chinese Television Network, Marketing Director

== Filmography ==
- You Are the Apple of My Eye, Executive Producer

You Are the Apple of My Eye is a 2011 Taiwanese Romance film. It is based on the semi-autobiographical novel The Girl We Chased Together in Those Years by Taiwanese author Giddens Ko, who also made his directorial debut with the film. The film stars Ko Chen-tung as Ko Ching-teng, a prankster and a mischievous student who eventually becomes a writer. Michelle Chen stars as Shen Chia-yi, an honor student who is very popular amongst the boys in her class. The film's world premiere was at the 13th Taipei Film Festival on 25 June 2011, and it was subsequently released in Taiwanese cinemas on 19 August. Well received by film critics, the movie set box-office records in Taiwan, Hong Kong, and Singapore. Ko Chen-tung won the Best Newcomer award at the Golden Horse Awards for his role in the film.

- Tiny Times, Film Producer

Tiny Times is a 2013 Chinese romance drama film written and directed by Guo Jingming and based on the best-selling novel of the same name also by Guo. The story follows the film's narrator and protagonist Lin Xiao, played by Yang Mi, along with her best friends Gu Li, Nan Xiang, Tang Wanru, as they navigate between relationships, work and friendship in Shanghai. The film received mostly negative reviews from Chinese film critics, although it was a commercial success. A sequel titled Tiny Times 2, which was filmed together with the first film and based on the second half of the novel, was released on August 8, 2013. Tiny Times 3, the third installment of the Tiny Times series was released on July 17, 2014.

- Café. Waiting. Love, Film Producer

Café. Waiting. Love is a 2014 Taiwanese romantic comedy film directed by Chiang Chin-lin. It was based on Gidden Ko's original novel. By reaching the box office to NTD 440 million dollars, this film is the second place in box office in 2014 for domestically-made movies.Café. Waiting. Love was nominated for Best Film From Mainland and Taiwan of 33rd Hong Kong Film Awards. The original songs sung by Harlem Yu and Shennio Lin have been viewed over 25 million times.

- The Tenants Downstairs, Director

The Tenants Downstairs is a Taiwanese black humor, fantasy, mystery and thriller film, directed by Adam Tsuei, planned to come out in 2016. The story is about a man inherited an old apartment and decided to land it to tenants who have different kind of strange additions. By setting the pinhole cameras in the apartment, he enjoys the pleasure of peeping people and discovering their secrets. However, the story within those tenants and the landlord are becoming more and more crazy and complicating..This film has got the Audience Award from Taipei Film Festival as the opening film for Taipei Film Festival, the closing film for New York Asian Film Festival, the audience award for Razor Reel Flanders Film Festival, and been nominated in L'Étrange Film Festival and Bucheon International Fantastic Film Festival The film's box office is $4.3 Million, which is ranking No.2 Taiwanese film in Taiwan's market.

== Concerts ==
- 2010 Joanna Wang “The Adult’s Book” concert
- 2010 Rainie Yang “Whimsical World” concert
- 2008 Sony Multi-Artists “Dare to Be Different” concert
- 2006 Leehom Wang “The Hero” concert
- 2006 F4 “Forever 4” concert in Hong Kong
- 2004 Jolin Tsai "J1 World Tour"
- 2001 F4 Music Party
- 1997 BMG 10th Anniversary concert

== Artists ==
- Leehom Wang
- Jay Chou
- F4
- Harlem Yu
- Jolin Tsai
- Rainie Yang
- Joanna Wang
- Faye Wong
- Karen Mok
- Desert Xuan
- Andy Lau
- Leon Lai
- Jordan Chan
- Jacky Wu
- Julia Peng
- Vivian Hsu
- Lin Yu Chung
