= Kaleidoscope (Jolin Tsai song) =

Single by Jolin Tsai
- Language: Mandarin
- Released: June 13, 2014
- Genre: Pop
- Length: 4:00
- Label: Warner; Eternal
- Composer: Real Huang
- Lyricist: Matthew Yen
- Producer: Tiger Chung

Jolin Tsai singles chronology
"Journey" (2012)	"Kaleidoscope" (2014)	"Phony Queen" (2014)

Music video
- "Kaleidoscope" on YouTube

"Kaleidoscope" (Chinese: 萬花瞳; pinyin: Wàn huā tóng) is a song by Taiwanese singer Jolin Tsai. Written by Real Huang and Matthew Yen, and produced by Tiger Chung, the track was released as a single on June 13, 2014, by Warner. It serves as the theme song for the 2014 Chinese film Tiny Times 3.

== Background ==
On December 10, 2013, film director Guo Jingming announced the commencement of filming for Tiny Times 3 in Rome. On June 9, 2014, Guo revealed that Tsai had been invited to perform the film's theme song. Guo envisioned a track that would blend fashion, trendiness, avant-garde energy, and optimism, aligning with the film's atmosphere. After understanding the creative direction, Tsai paused work on her upcoming album to engage personally in the song's selection, lyrics, and production process. Both Tsai and the production team were keen on the collaboration, and the project quickly gained momentum.

== Composition and recording ==
"Kaleidoscope" explores themes of youth as a period of transformation, likening it to a butterfly emerging from its cocoon. The song encourages embracing the future with passion and determination, promising vibrant experiences, akin to the dynamic patterns of a kaleidoscope. Tsai's vocals express these themes through a combination of low and expansive high notes, delivering an emotionally resonant performance.

Notably, the song marked Tsai's first collaboration with producer Tiger Chung. The recording process was completed in a single afternoon. Unlike her typical dance-pop style, "Kaleidoscope" features a prominent emphasis on live instrumentation and a broader vocal range. The track's arrangement highlights Tsai's vocal dynamics, underlining the song's message of resilience and youthful energy.

Film director Guo Jingming, known for his meticulous approach to lyrics, praised the song's lyrics, commenting that "Not a single word needs to be changed, because it is simply too beautiful."

== Release ==
"Kaleidoscope" was released as a single on June 13, 2014, and its accompanying music video premiered on June 16, 2014, at a press conference for Tiny Times 3 during the Shanghai International Film Festival. In a recorded message, Tsai expressed her excitement about the synergy between the song and the film. Film director Guo Jingming highlighted that while the previous Tiny Times installments had featured somber and weighty theme songs, "Kaleidoscope" represented the forward-looking, colorful facets of youth.

== Release history ==
Release dates and formats for "Kaleidoscope"
Region	Date	Format(s)	Distributor
Various	June 13, 2014	Digital download; streaming; radio airplay	Eternal
