= Ren Yankai =

Chinese actor

- Born: February 27, 1984 (age 42); Taiwan
- Education: Chinese Culture University
- Occupation: Actor
- Years active: 2013–present
- Agent: Mega Star Entertainment

Chinese name
- Simplified Chinese: 任言恺
Transcriptions

Ren Yankai (Chinese: 任言恺; born February 27, 1984) is a Chinese actor. He is best known for his role as Gu Zhun in the film series Tiny Times .

== Filmography ==
=== Film ===
Year	English title	Chinese title	Role	Notes/Ref.
2014	Tiny Times 3	小时代3	Gu Zhun	
2015	Tiny Times 4	小时代4	Gu Zhun	
2015	The Old Cinderella 2	男神时代	Lin Zisong	
2016	Master of Pretending	假装看不见	Li Muran	

=== Television series ===
Year	English title	Chinese title	Role	Network	Notes/Ref.
2015	Midnight Taxi 2	午夜计程车	Zhou Dayu	Youku	
2016	Let's Fashion Together	极品模王	Gao Weiwen	LeTV	
2016	Yes! Mr. Fashion	是！尚先生	Gao Ming	Hunan TV	
2017	The Legendary School: Three Lives Three Worlds Tao Hua Yuan	学院传说之三生三世桃花缘	Miao Li	LeTV	
2017	April Star	繁星四月	Hu Xia	Jiangsu TV, Anhui TV	
2017	My Ruby My Blood	一粒红尘	Jian Chenye	Dragon TV	
2018	The Lost Swordship	飘香剑雨	Yi Feng	iQiyi	
2019	Destiny's Love	爱上北斗星男友	Tang Mao	iQiyi	
2019	The Prince of Tennis	奋斗吧少年	Ji Jingwu	Hunan TV	
2019	My Mowgli Boy	我的莫格利男孩	Zheng Li	iQiyi	
2020	Falling in Love With You in the Contract Period	约定期间爱上你	Lu Boyan	Youku	
2021	Please! 8 Hours	拜托了！8小时	Lin Feng	iQiyi	
