= Tiny Times 2 =

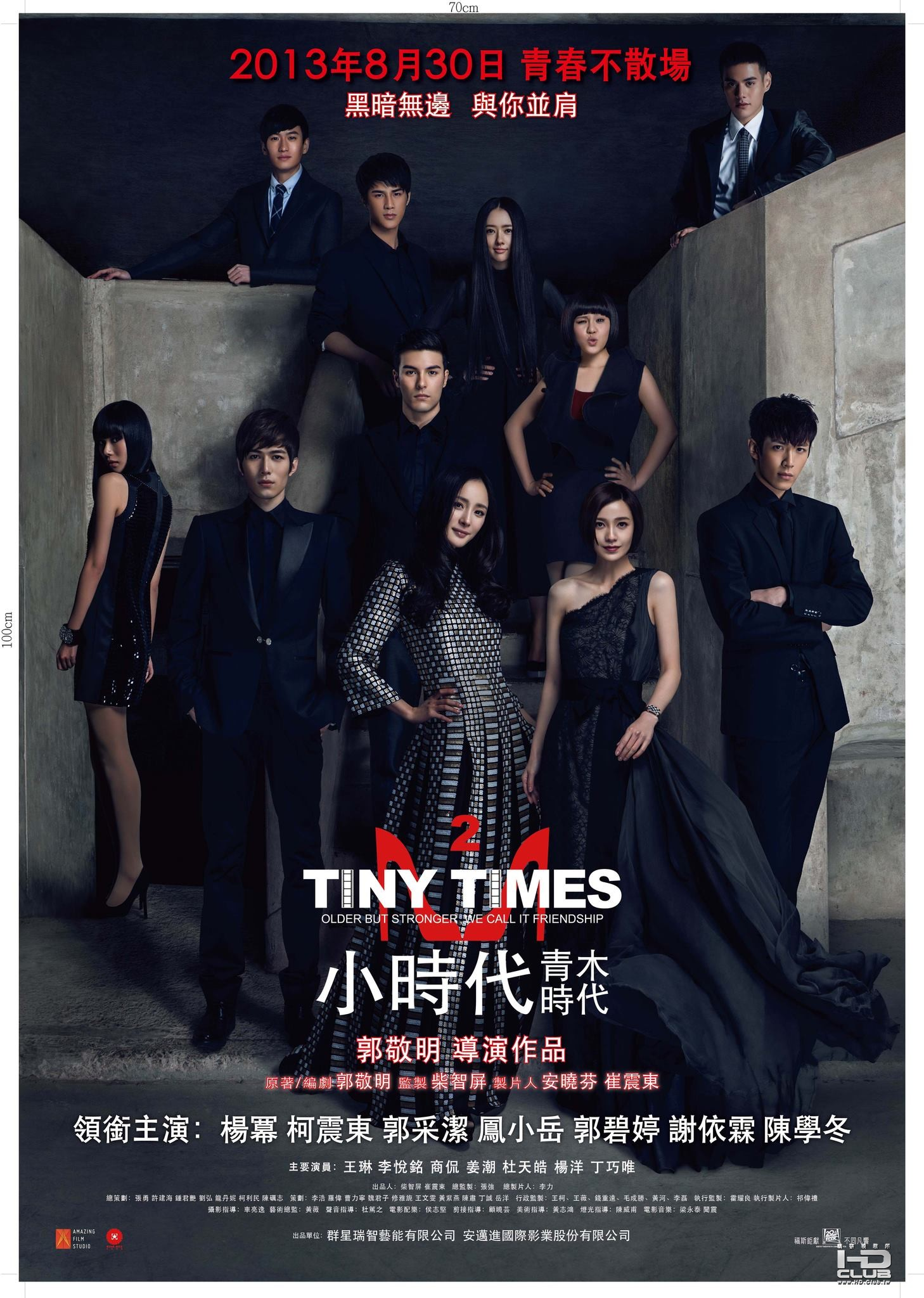
- Film poster
- Directed by: Guo Jingming
- Written by: Guo Jingming
- Based on: Tiny Times 2.0 by Guo Jingming
- Produced by: Qi Weili; Guo Jingming; Adam Tsuei
- Starring: Yang Mi; Kai Ko; Amber Kuo; Rhydian Vaughan; Cheney Chen; Bea Hayden; Evonne Hsieh; Li Yueming; Jiang Chao
- Cinematography: Randy Che
- Edited by: Ku Hsiao-Yun
- Music by: Chris Hou
- Production companies: EE-Media; Beijing Forbidden City Film; He Li Chen Guang International Culture Media Co.; Star Ritz Productions; Desen International Media; Le Vision Pictures (Tianjin) Co.; Amazing Film Studio
- Release date: August 8, 2013
- Running time: 116 minutes
- Country: China
- Language: Mandarin
- Box office: US$47.22 million

Tiny Times 2 (Chinese: 小时代：青木时代) is a 2013 Chinese romantic drama film and the second installment of the Tiny Times franchise directed and written by Guo Jingming. The film was filmed together with the first film, and is based on the second half of Guo's own novel. Tiny Times 3, the third installment of the Tiny Times series was released on July 17, 2014.

== Plot ==
After graduation, the girls gathered together at Gu Li's mansion to celebrate her birthday. However, nobody expected that this would be a hidden veiled event filled with foreboding and betrayal.

A dirty secret was revealed between Gu Li and Nan Xiang's ex-boyfriend, Cheng Xi; causing the sisters to fall out and brothers to turn against each other. Shortly after, Gu Li's father died and she was forced to inherit the company, but is faced with the risk of having her company taken away by business competitors.

Lin Xiao finds out that her boyfriend is cheating on her, but yet could not bear to give up on their relationship. At the same time, she and colleague Zhou Chong Guang starts to get closer.

== Cast ==
- Yang Mi as Lin Xiao
- Kai Ko as Gu Yuan
- Amber Kuo as Gu Li
- Rhydian Vaughan as Gong Ming
- Cheney Chen as Zhou Chong Guang
- Bea Hayden as Nan Xiang
- Evonne Hsieh as Tang Wanru
- Li Yueming as Jian Xi
- Jiang Chao as Xi Cheng
- Calvin Tu as Wei Hai
- Kiwi Shang as Kitty
- Wang Lin as Ye Chuanping
- Ding Qiaowei as Yuan Yi
- Yolanda Yang as Lin Quan

== Original soundtrack ==
Song Category	Song Name	Singer	Notes
Theme song	我好想你	Sodagreen	
Soundtrack	小小姑娘	Peng Jiayu	
Soundtrack	把你推开像太极拳	Ray Ray	
Soundtrack	万物无邪	Cheney Chen	
Soundtrack	面面心跳	Cheney Chen	
Soundtrack	時間煮雨	Yisa Yu	
Soundtrack	殘忍的纏綿	Liu Xin	
Soundtrack	雨	Fu Mengni	
Soundtrack	小小时代	Various	
Soundtrack	你讓星星發亮	Gao Kaiwei	
Soundtrack	停停停	Gao Kaiwei	
Soundtrack	不管發生什麼別放開我的手	Gao Kaiwei, Ray Ray	
Soundtrack	Go	Julia Wu	
Soundtrack	Love Come Undone	Julia Wu	
Soundtrack	Whatever	Julia Wu	
Soundtrack	Everything	Terence	
