= All's Well, Ends Well 2012 =

2012 Hong Kong film by Chan Hing-ka and Janet Chun

- Film poster
- Traditional Chinese: 八星抱喜
- Simplified Chinese: 八星抱喜
- Hanyu Pinyin: Bā Xīng Bào Xǐ
- Jyutping: Baat3 Sing1 Pou3 Hei2
- Directed by: Chan Hing-kai; Janet Chun
- Written by: Chan Hing-kai; Ho Miu-kei
- Produced by: Raymond Wong; Zhang Zhao
- Starring: Donnie Yen; Louis Koo; Sandra Ng; Kelly Chen; Raymond Wong; Yang Mi; Chapman To; Wenwen Han
- Cinematography: Cheung Man-po
- Edited by: Cheung Ka-fai
- Music by: Chiu Tsang-hei; Andy Cheung
- Production companies: Mandarin Films Ltd. Pegasus Motion Pictures
- Distributed by: Pegasus Motion Pictures Distribution
- Release date: 19 January 2012
- Running time: 117 minutes
- Country: Hong Kong
- Language: Cantonese
- Box office: HK$12,105,232

All's Well, Ends Well 2012 (Chinese: 八星抱喜) is a 2012 Hong Kong romantic comedy film directed by Chan Hing-ka and Janet Chun. It is the seventh instalment in the All's Well, Ends Well film series.

== Plot ==
Four men go on a heroic mission to help four women and wind up experiencing a series of mishaps.

== Cast ==
- Donnie Yen as Carl Tam
- Louis Koo as Holland Pang
- Sandra Ng as Chelsia Sung
- Kelly Chen as Julie Sun
- Raymond Wong as Richard Chu
- Yang Mi as Cecilia Chan
- Chapman To as Hugo Wah
- Lynn Hung as Charmaine Tam
- Ronald Cheng as Shalala
- Karena Ng as Carmen Chu
- Kristal Tin as Daphne Wong
- Lam Suet as Bing-kun
- C-Kwan as Jim
- Vincent Kok as Fattie
- Gong Linna as Xia Fan
- Cherrie Ying as Carl's girlfriend
- Lee Heung-kam as Orphanage head
- Yu Mo-lin as Ho Pik-wan
- Matt Chow as Lawyer Yi
- Manor Chan as Sofia
- Hiro Hayama as Spungehuff Mok
- Singh Hartihan Bitto as Curry
- Michelle Lo as Ms. Lo
- Mak Ling-ling as Mak Ling-ling
- Kelena Poon as Schoolgirl
- Zeny Kwok as Schoolgirl
- Maria Cordero as Chelsia and Daphne's mentor
- Jiro Lee as Billy
- Ciwi Lam as New music star
- James Ho as New music star
- Jeremy Liu as Justin Nam
- 6-Wing as Rich Junior
- Wan Chiu as Dubya Dung
- Chui Tien-you as Eye doctor
- Ha Chun-chau as Wedding registrar
- Teresa Carpio as herself
- Peter Lai as himself
- Louis Cheung as himself
- Wilfred Lau as himself
- Patrick Dunn as Tall Guy
- Steven Fung as Snake
- Danny Chan as Helmet
- Alex Cheng as Clayhead
- Tony Hung as Sing
- Wong Yuk-long as Boss Wong
- Helen Ma
- Tyson Chak
- Cheuk Wan-chi
- May Chan
- Andrew Fung as Fung Fung
- Scarlett Wong as Ms. Blanche
- Six Luk as Unlucky driver
- Lam Chak-kwan as Doctor
- Cham Kei-ching as Boss's daughter
- Chan Chi-yan as Mentor's assistant
