= Hiro Hayama =

Japanese actor and model

- Born: Hiroyoshi Komuro; April 10, 1975 (age 50); Kyoto, Japan
- Occupation: Actor
- Years active: 2001–present

Chinese name
- Traditional Chinese: 葉山豪
- Simplified Chinese: 叶山豪
Transcriptions
Yue: Cantonese
- Jyutping: Hip6 Saan1 Hou4

Hiro Hayama (葉山 豪, Hayama Hiro), born Hiroyoshi Komuro (小室 博義, Komuro Hiroyoshi), is a Japanese actor and former model based in Hong Kong.

== Filmography ==
- Enter the Fat Dragon (2020)
- Tail Card Q1 (2018)
- Chou Fu Zhe Union (2016)
- Girls (2014)
- Firestorm (2013)
- Lucky Dog (2012)
- The First Love (2012)
- Vulgaria (2012)
- All's Well, Ends Well 2012 (2012)
- Mysterious Island (2011)
- 3D Sex and Zen: Extreme Ecstasy (2011)
- The Jade and the Pearl (2010)
- Break Up Club (2010)
- Rob-B-Hood (2006)
- New Police Story (2004)
