= Kuo Bea-ting =

Taiwanese actress and model

- 郭碧婷
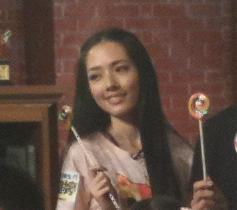
- Kuo in 2010
- Born: Kuo Hsin-yen; January 16, 1984 (age 42); Taipei, Taiwan
- Other name: Bea Hayden
- Education: Private Taipei Senior High School
- Occupations: Actress; Model
- Years active: 2002–present
- Agent: Qiyi Entertainment
- Height: 1.69 m (5 ft 7 in)
- Spouse: Jacky Heung (m. 2019)
- Children: 2

Real name: Kuo Hsin-yen
- Chinese: 郭芯妍
Transcriptions
Standard Mandarin
- Hanyu Pinyin: Guō Xīnyán
- Wade–Giles: Kuo Hsin-yen

Stage name: Kuo Bea-ting
- Chinese: 郭碧婷
Transcriptions
Standard Mandarin
- Hanyu Pinyin: Guō Bìtíng
- Wade–Giles: Kuo Pi-ting

Kuo Hsin-yen (Chinese: 郭碧婷; born 16 January 1984), better known by her stage name Kuo Bea-ting or English name Bea Hayden, is a Taiwanese actress and model. She is best known for her work in the Tiny Times film series.

== Biography ==
Kuo Hsin-yen was born on January 16, 1984, in Taipei, Taiwan. She is of Eurasian descent, mostly Taiwanese with a quarter White American ancestry.

She emerged as a model in 2002, appearing in numerous Taiwanese fashion magazines.

== Filmography ==
=== Films ===
Year	EnglishTitle	Original title	Role	Director	Notes
2007	Keeping Watch	沉睡的青春	Xu Qingqing	Zheng Fenfen	
2008	Hundred Days of Solitude				
2010	In Case of Love	街角的小王子	Ye Xiaojing	Lin Xiaoqian	
2011	If Without You	假如沒有你	An Chu'er	Yang Kunrong	
2013	Tiny Times	小時代	Nan Xiang	Guo Jingming	
2013	Tiny Times 2	小時代：青木時代	Nan Xiang	Guo Jingming	
2014	Tiny Times 3	小時代：刺金時代	Nan Xiang	Guo Jingming	
2014	Love Evolutionism	愛情進化論	An An	Liu Rongyan	
2015	Let's Get Married	咱們結婚吧	Wen Yi	Liu Jiang	
2015	Where the Wind Settles	風中家族	Qiu Xiang	Toon Wang	
2015	Tiny Times 4	小時代：靈魂盡頭	Nan Xiang	Guo Jingming	
2018	Bonjour Les Couleurs De L'amour	宇宙有愛浪漫同遊	Tina	Andrea Klarin	
2018	Kung Fu Monster	武林怪兽	Frigid	Andrew Lau	
2019	Goodbye First Love				
2020	Almost Human	機械畫皮	Suxin		
2023	100 Yards	門前寶地			

=== Television series ===
Year	Title	Role	Director	Notes
2006	Golden Age	Xu Manli	Li Dawei	
2013	Treasure Safeguarding	Cheng Caiyu	Fan Xiuming	
2014	Line Romance	Ling Ling	Choi Jong-soo; Jang Soo-bong	Web series
2015	Hero Dog	Ding Han	Wang Xiaolie	
2016	Let's Fashion Together	Xian'er	Li Boen	
2017	The Starry Night, The Starry Sea	Shen Luo	Wei Hantao	
2017	The Starry Night, The Starry Sea 2	Lu Li	Wei Hantao	
2017	Huang Fei Hong	Mo Guilan	Jiang Jiajun	Web series
2019	Green Door	Hung Yu-mei	Lingo Hsieh	
