= Yang Mi =

Chinese actress and singer (born 1986)

- 杨幂
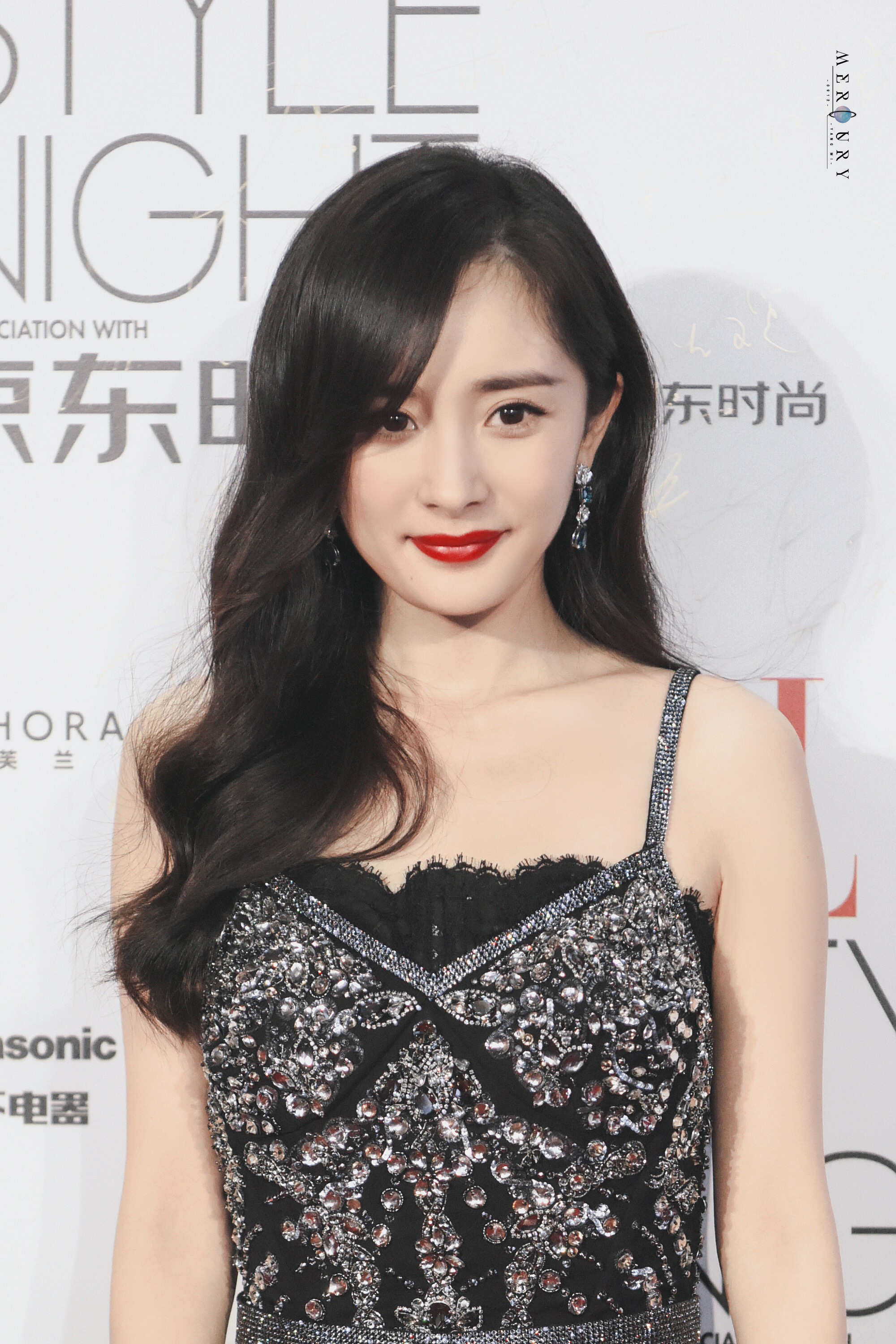
- Yang in September 2018
- Born: 12 September 1986 (age 40); Beijing, China
- Other name: Mini Yang
- Education: Beijing Film Academy
- Occupations: Actress; singer; television producer
- Years active: 1991–present
- Agent: Yang Mi Studio
- Spouse: Hawick Lau (m. 2014; div. 2018)
- Children: 1

Chinese name
- Traditional Chinese: 楊冪
- Simplified Chinese: 杨幂
Transcriptions
Standard Mandarin
- Hanyu Pinyin: Yáng Mì

Yang Mi (Chinese: 杨幂, born 12 September 1986), also known as Mini Yang, is a Chinese actress and singer. She began her career as a child actress in Tang Ming Huang (1990) and transitioned to adult roles in the 2000s, gaining recognition with Wang Zhaojun (2007), which earned her a Best Actress nomination at the 24th China TV Golden Eagle Awards. She further rose to prominence with supporting roles in The Return of the Condor Heroes (2006) and Chinese Paladin 3 (2009).

Yang's breakthrough came with the time-travel drama Palace (2011), which brought her widespread popularity and several awards and nominations, including a Best Actress nomination and a win for Most Popular Actress at the 17th Shanghai Television Festival. Her roles in Ru Yi (2011) and Beauty World (2012) brought her additional Huading Awards nominations for Best Actress. She won the Best Actress award at the 26th China TV Golden Eagle Awards for her performance in Beijing Love Story (2012). She went on to star in hit series such as Swords of Legends (2014), The Interpreter (2016), Eternal Love (2017), and Legend of Fuyao (2018). More recently, she headlined Novoland: Pearl Eclipse (2021) and In the Name of the Brother (2024), the latter of which was nominated for Best Series Drama at the Seoul International Drama Awards.

In film, Yang gained popularity with Mysterious Island (2011) and starred in the commercially successful Tiny Times film series (2013–2015). She won Best Actress at the 50th WorldFest-Houston International Film Festival for Reset (2017), and received critical acclaim for Baby (2018), which was screened at the Toronto International Film Festival and 66th San Sebastián International Film Festival, receiving a nomination for the Silver Shell for Best Actress in the latter.

Recognized as one of China's New Four Dan Actresses by Tencent in 2009 and by Southern Metropolis Entertainment Weekly in 2013 respectively, Yang ranked as China's top celebrity for advertising and commercial value as of June 2024, according to Statista.

== Early life ==
Yang Mi was born in Xuanwu District, Beijing to a police officer and a housewife. She was given the name "幂" (exponentiation) because her parents both have the same surname Yang. She attended the now-defunct Beijing Xuanwu Experimental Primary School. Yang is a graduate of Beijing Film Academy's Performance Department.

== Career ==
=== Beginnings ===
In 1990, at the age of four, Yang made her acting debut in the historical television series Tang Ming Huang directed by Chen Jialin, playing the role of young Princess Xianning. She also had a minor role as Beggar So's daughter in King of Beggars (1992), which starred Stephen Chow as the titular character. Two years later, she starred in the television series Hou Wa, where her acting left a deep impression on the producer.

In 2001, Yang resumed her career in entertainment business by working as an advertisement model. In 2002, Yang signed a contract with Li Shaohong's agency, Rosat Entertainment. In 2003, Yang received her first script and made her official acting debut in The Story of a Noble Family.

=== 2006–2010: Rising popularity ===
In the late 2000s, Yang started to gain increased attention and popularity with her roles as Nie Xiaoqian in legendary drama Strange Tales of Liaozhai (2005), and Guo Xiang in wuxia drama The Return of the Condor Heroes (2006), In 2007, Yang played the titular role of Wang Zhaojun in the eypnomous television series, which was broadcast on CCTV. She received positive reviews for her performance, and was nominated for the Best Actress award at the China TV Golden Eagle Award.

In 2009, Yang starred in the fantasy action drama Chinese Paladin 3, playing two different characters; Tang Xuejian and Xiyao. The series was a major hit in China and Yang experienced a rise in popularity.

In 2010, Yang starred in Li Shaohong's adaptation of the classic novel The Dream of Red Mansions, and received positive reviews for her portrayal of Qingwen. The same year, she starred in big-budget historical series Beauty's Rival in Palace, winning acclaim for her role as a cold assassin.

=== 2011–present: Breakthrough and Mainstream success ===
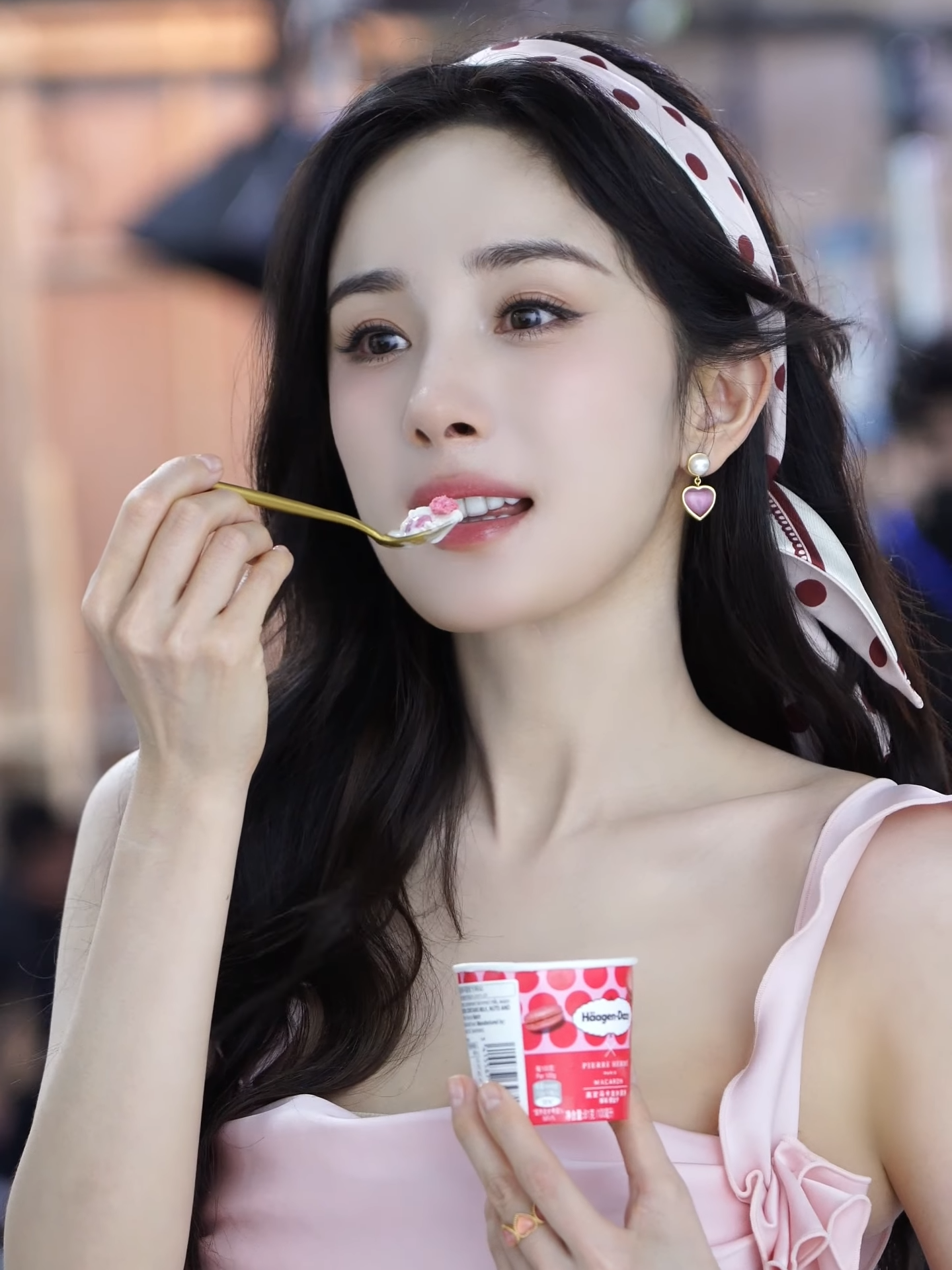
Yang Mi in an advertisement for Häagen-Dazs, June 7, 2024

In 2011, Yang achieved widespread fame with her role as the time-traveling protagonist in the hit historical romance drama, Palace (2011). She was voted the Most Popular Actress at the 17th Shanghai Television Festival. The theme song of the drama sung by Yang, titled "In Support of the Love", was also a hit and won Best Theme Song (OST) at the 6th Huading Awards. The same year, she starred in horror film Mysterious Island, for which she was credited with ushering China's entertainment industry into the "fan economy." It raked in more than 70 million yuan at the box office and became the most successful horror film in China.

Mei Ah Entertainment announced that it will be producing four tailored-made films (Wu Dang, Chinese Princess Turandot, Windseeker, and Butterfly Cemetery) for Yang with a total investment of 300 million yuan for the four films due to the box office success of Mysterious Island. However, the films failed to live up to the success of Mysterious Island, and Yang was named Most Disappointing Actress at the Golden Broom Awards for her performance in Wu Dang.

In 2012, Yang starred in Beijing Love Story, a modern romance drama directed by Chen Sicheng; where she played a prideful gold digger. The series was a hit, and Yang won the Best Actress award at the 26th China TV Golden Eagle Awards. The same year she co-starred in Painted Skin: The Resurrection, a sequel to Gordon Chan's 2008 hit fantasy film Painted Skin.

Yang was then announced to play the leading protagonist Lin Xiao in the Tiny Times film series, based on Guo Jingming's best-selling novel of the same name. The first two installments of the film were released in 2013, with the subsequent installments released in 2014 and 2015. Despite receiving negative reviews, Tiny Times was an overwhelming success at the box office. Also in 2013, Yang took on the role of a television producer for the first time with web series V Love.

In 2014, Yang starred in the comedy film The Breakup Guru directed by Deng Chao. The film grossed 180 million yuan in its opening week and ended up as one of the highest-grossing films in China that year. She then starred in fantasy action drama Swords of Legends as the female lead Feng Qingxue. The drama was a commercial success, topping television ratings and becoming the most watched Chinese drama online at that time. In the same year Yang co-founded her own agency Jiaxing Media.

In 2015, Yang starred in romance films You Are My Sunshine with Huang Xiaoming and Fall in Love Like a Star with Li Yifeng. She also challenged the role of a blind girl in The Witness, adapted from the South Korean thriller Blind.

In 2016, Yang starred in the modern drama The Interpreter, which premiered on Hunan TV. The series was a huge success, and became the highest-rated drama of 2016. She also featured in fantasy animated film L.O.R.D: Legend of Ravaging Dynasties, directed by Tiny Times director Guo Jingming.

In 2017, Yang starred in Eternal Love, adapted from the xianxia novel Three Lives Three Worlds, Ten Miles of Peach Blossoms by TangQi GongZi. The fantasy-romance drama was a massive hit both locally and internationally and Yang received acclaim for her acting performance in the drama. She then starred in science fiction thriller Reset produced by Jackie Chan, which led to her win for Best Actress at the 50th WorldFest-Houston International Film Festival. Yang next starred in wuxia film Brotherhood of Blades II: The Infernal Battlefield alongside Chang Chen as a painter. She ranked third on Forbes China Celebrity 100 list for the year, her highest ranking yet.

In 2018, Yang starred in Negotiator, a modern workplace drama which deals with the profession of negotiators. Yang then headlined the fantasy adventure drama Legend of Fuyao. Yang returned to the big screen with Baby directed by Liu Jie, a film which tells the story of a woman who was abandoned by her parents due to severe birth defects, and her battle as an adult to try and save a baby in the same situation. She received positive reviews for her portrayal of a brittle, harried working-class woman prematurely aged by ill health and poverty. Her film Baby (Bao bai er) was selected for the "Special Presentations" section of the 43rd Toronto International Film Festival and competed in the main competition of the San Sebastián International Film Festival, where she received a nomination for the Silver Shell for Best Actress in the latter. The same year, she was cast in the fantasy suspense film Assassin in Red directed by Lu Yang; where she would play the role of an antagonist.

In 2019, Yang starred in the period drama The Great Craftsman. Yang was cast in the cyber-security drama Storm Eye as a police officer; and medical drama Thank You Doctor as a surgeon.

In 2020, Yang was cast in the historical fantasy drama Novoland: Pearl Eclipse.

On 10 May 2023, Yang officially announced she had left Jiaxing Media.

In 2024, Yang's TV series In the Name of the Brother was nominated Best Series Drama at the Seoul International Drama Awards.

In 2026, Yang won the Actress of the Year award at the 4th CMG Annual Chinese TV Drama Ceremony for her role as Ning Xiu Xiu in This Thriving Land. This marked her first "Best Actress" title in nearly 14 years, since winning the Golden Eagle Award for Best Actress in 2012.

== Personal life ==
=== Relationship ===
In early 2012, Yang revealed her relationship with Hong Kong actor-singer Hawick Lau through her Weibo. In November 2013, she announced their engagement. Yang and Lau were married in Bali, Indonesia on 8 January 2014. On 1 June 2014, she gave birth to their daughter at the Hong Kong Adventist Hospital, Hong Kong. On 22 December 2018, Yang and Lau announced their divorce.

=== Politics ===
In August of 2019, Yang cut ties with Versace after they released tops with designs from different countries and cities. The subject of conflict was after Versace had suggested that Hong Kong and Macau were separate counties form China, sparking controversy.

On 25 March 2021, Yang cut ties with Adidas, after several companies including the brand announced its decision to not use cotton sourced from the Xinjiang region due to concerns of Uyghur forced labour. This action was echoed by most Chinese celebrities.

== Filmography ==
=== Film ===
Year	Title	Role	Notes	Ref.
1992	King of Beggars	Beggar So's daughter	Cameo	
1993	Heroes' Calamities	Mr Su's daughter		
1997	Singer	Xiaoxia's cousin		
2007	The Door	Wenxin		
2011	Mysterious Island	Shen Yilin		
2011	East Meets West 2011	Yang Mi	Cameo	
2012	All's Well, Ends Well 2012	Chen Sisi		
2012	Perfect Two	Fang Jiawei		
2012	Love in the Buff	Shang Youyou		
2012	On My Way	Xie Zi	Cameo	
2012	Painted Skin: The Resurrection	Que'er		
2012	Wu Dang	Tianxin		
2012	The Bullet Vanishes	Xiao Yunque		
2012	Holding Love	Zhou Jing		
2012	All for Love	Xiao Ma	Cameo	
2013	Tiny Times	Lin Xiao		
2013	Tiny Times 2	Lin Xiao		
2013	Saving Mother Robot	Primary School Teacher	Cameo	
2014	Snow Blossom	Taohua Kai	Digital film	
2014	The Breakup Guru	Ye Xiaochun		
2014	Tiny Times 3	Lin Xiao		
2015	You Are My Sunshine	Zhao Mosheng		
2015	Tiny Times 4	Lin Xiao		
2015	Cities in Love	Zi Tong		
2015	The Witness	Lu Xiaoxing		
2015	Fall in Love Like a Star	Tian Xin		
2016	Kung Fu Panda 3	Mei Mei (voice)	Chinese dub	
2016	L.O.R.D: Legend of Ravaging Dynasties	Shen Yin		
2017	Reset	Xia Tian		
2017	Brotherhood of Blades II: The Infernal Battlefield	Bei Zhai		
2018	Baby	Jiang Meng		
2019	Liberation	He Xiuping	Cameo	
2021	A Writer's Odyssey	Tu Ling		
2023	Nothing Can't Be Undone by a HotPot	Yao Ji		
2024	She's Got No Name	Wang Xumei		
2025	The Lychee Road	Zheng Yuting		
2026	Scare Out	Bai Fan		

Short film

Year	Title	Role	Notes	Ref.
2011	Mojo			
2011	Lux	Lisa	Lux short film	
2012	Create For Hope			
2012	Exchange Journey		Also director	
2013	Take The Happy Home 2013			
2014	Take The Happy Home 2014			
2015	The Most Beautiful Performance 2015			
2016	I Am Your Xiaomi Phone	Xiao Mi	Oppo short film	
2018	Two Little Planets			
2018	Becoming		Elle short film	

=== Television series ===
Year	Title	Role	Notes	Ref.
1990	Tang Ming Huang	young Princess Xianyi		
1993	Monkey Doll	Nannan		
2004	The Story of a Noble Family	Li Xiaotao		
2004	Shuang Xiang Pao	daughter in-law		
2005	Days and a Bureau	Zhu Yuqiu		
2005	Beijing Fairytale	Zhu Zhu		
2005	Strange Tales of Liaozhai	Nie Xiaoqian		
2006	The Return of the Condor Heroes	Guo Xiang		
2007	Wang Zhaojun	Wang Zhaojun		
2007	Beautiful Life	Cheng Xiaonuo		
2008	The Prince's Education	Dun'er		
2009	Dark Fragrance	Miss Xiaojin		
2009	Chinese Paladin 3	Tang Xuejian / Xiyao		
2010	Detective Di Renjie – Prequel	Ling Long		
2010	Beauty's Rival in Palace	Mo Xueyan		
2010	The Dream of Red Mansions	Qing Wen		
2010	My Bratty Bride	Yan Xiaoman		
2011	Jump With Joy	Zha Ning		
2011	The Legend of the Twelve Chinese Zodiacs	Qing Li		
2011	We Are a Family	Xia Jiajia		
2011	Palace	Luo Qingchuan / Hua Ying		
2011	Painted Skin	Xiao Hong		
2011	Judgement of Hong Wu	Cai Jue		
2011	The Four Brothers of Peking	Yin Baixue		
2011	Met As Strangers, Once Acquainted	He Meiji		
2011	Expressway of First Empire	Princess Ling		
2011	Symphony of Fate	Hao Anqi		
2011	Beauty World	Qingluan		
2012	Beijing Love Story	Yang Zixi		
2012	Palace II	Luo Qingchuan / Hua Ying	Cameo	
2012	Ru Yi	Ru Yi		
2012	Legend of the Military Seal	Concubine Ru		
2013	Diors Man 2	Producer	Cameo	
2013	A Clear Midsummer Night	Xia Wanqing		
2014	The Four Scholars in Jianghan	Madame Tang	Cameo	
2014	Swords of Legends	Feng Qingxue		
2014	V Love	Luo Yi	Also producer	
2016	The Interpreter	Qiao Fei		
2017	Eternal Love	Bai Qian / Su Su / Si Yin		
2018	Negotiator	Tong Wei		
2018	Legend of Fuyao	Fuyao		
2019	The Great Craftsman	Fu Hanjun		
2020	Eternal Love of Dream	Bai Qian	Cameo (ep. 22, 24)	
2021	Storm Eye	An Jing		
2021	Novoland: Pearl Eclipse	Ye Haishi / Fang Haishi		
2022	Thank You, Doctor	Xiao Yan		
2022	She and Her Perfect Husband	Qin Shi		
2024	In the Name of the Brother	Guan Xue		
2024	Fox Spirit Matchmaker: Red-Moon Pact	Tushan Honghong		
2025	This Thriving Land	Ning Xiuxiu		

=== Variety shows ===
Year	Title	Role	Ref.
2016	Takes a Real Man 2	Cast member	
2017	The Coming One	Celebrity commentator	
2018	The Coming One 2	Celebrity commentator	
2019	Great Escape	Cast member	
2019	China's Got Talent	Judge	
2020	Great Escape 2	Cast member	
2021	Great Escape 3	Cast member	
2022	We are the champions	Cast member	
2022	Great Escape 4	Cast member	

== Discography ==
=== Album ===
Year	English title	Chinese title	Ref.
2012	Close to Me	亲幂关系	

=== Soundtrack appearances ===
Year	English title	Chinese title	Album	Ref.
2009	"Shu Li Moon"	琉璃月	Tian Xia Ni OST	
2011	"In Support of the Love"	爱的供养	Palace OST	
2011	"Bright Moon"	明月	Palace OST	
2012	"Love Love"	爱情爱情	Beijing Love Story OST	
2012	"Don't Bear To"	有点舍不得	Ru Yi OST	
2012	"On My Way"	跑出一片天	On My Way OST	
2012	"Love Map"	爱情地图	Wu Dang OST	
2013	"What If Love Grows Old"	如果爱老了	A Clear Midsummer Night OST	
2013	"Must Be Happy"	一定要幸福	A Clear Midsummer Night OST	
2014	"Her and Him"	她他	V Love OST	

=== Music video appearances ===
Year	English title	Chinese title	Singer	Ref.
1993	"Chuan Jun Zhuang De Chuan Mei Zi"	穿军装的川妹子	Li Danyang	

== Accolades ==
=== Awards and nominations ===
Year	Award	Category	Nominated work	Result	Ref.
Major awards
2008	24th China TV Golden Eagle Award	Best Actress	Wang Zhaojun	Nominated	
2011	6th Huading Awards	Best Actress (Fantasy Drama)	Palace	Nominated	
2011	6th Huading Awards	Best Original Soundtrack	In Support of the Love	Won	
2011	17th Shanghai Television Festival	Best Actress	Palace	Nominated	
2011	17th Shanghai Television Festival	Most Popular Actress	Palace	Won	
2011	15th China Music Awards	Best Television Actress (Mainland China)	—N/a	Won	
2012	Beijing Pop Music Awards	Most Popular Female New Singer	—N/a	Won	
2012	16th China Music Awards	Best Crossover Singer (Mainland China)	—N/a	Won	
2012	11th CCTV-MTV Music Awards	Most Popular Female Singer (Mainland China)	—N/a	Won	
2012	6th Migu Music Awards	Best-selling Original Soundtrack	In Support of the Love	Won	
2012	12th Chinese Film Media Awards	Most Anticipated Actress	Mysterious Island	Nominated	
2012	26th China TV Golden Eagle Award	Best Actress	Beijing Love Story	Won	
2012	8th Huading Awards	Best Actress	Ru Yi	Nominated	
2012	8th Huading Awards	Best Actress (Fantasy Drama)	Beauty World	Nominated	
2013	13th Chinese Film Media Awards	Most Anticipated Actress	Love in the Buff	Nominated	
2014	3rd China International Film Festival London	Overseas Influential Awards	—N/a	Won	
2015	5th Beijing International Film Festival	Goddess Award	—N/a	Won	
2015	17th Huading Awards	Best Actress	Swords of Legends	Nominated	
2015	15th Chinese Film Media Awards	Most Anticipated Actress	Tiny Times 3	Nominated	
2017	50th World-Fest Houston International Film Festival	Best Actress	Reset	Won	
2017	3rd Jackie Chan Action Movie Awards	Best Action Movie Actress	Reset	Won	
2017	14th China Movie Channel Media Awards	Best Actress	Reset	Nominated	
2017	8th Macau International Television Festival	Best Actress	Eternal Love	Nominated	
2017	1st Marianas International Film Festival	Best Actress	Brotherhood of Blades II: The Infernal Battlefield	Nominated	
2018	25th Beijing College Student Film Festival	Favorite Actress	Brotherhood of Blades II: The Infernal Battlefield	Won	
2018	24th Huading Awards	Best Actress (Ancient Drama)	Legend of Fuyao	Nominated	
2018	5th The Actors of China Award Ceremony	Best Actress (Emerald Category)	—N/a	Won	
2018	66th San Sebastián International Film Festival	Silver Shell for Best Actress	Baby	Nominated	
2019	16th Guangzhou Student Film Festival	Most Popular Actress	Baby	Won	
2020	30th China TV Golden Eagle Award	Audience's Choice for Actress	Legend of Fuyao	Nominated	
2026	4th CMG Annual Chinese TV Drama Ceremony	Actress of the Year	This Thriving Land	Won	
2026	31st Shanghai Television Festival	Best Actress	This Thriving Land	Nominated	
2026	38th Hundred Flowers Awards	Best Supporting Actress	The Lychee Road	Nominated	
2026	38th Hundred Flowers Awards	Best Supporting Actress	Scare Out	Nominated	
Other awards
2007	3rd Actors of China Ranking		Strange Tales of Liaozhai, The Return of the Condor Heroes	1st	
2011	Elle Style Awards	Newcomer of the Year	—N/a	Won	
2011	1st LeTV Entertainment Awards	Most Popular TV Actress (Asia Pacific)	—N/a	Won	
2011	Youku Index Awards	Popular Actress Award	Palace	Won	
2011	Enlight Media CETV Entertainment Awards	Leaping Figure (Television category)	Palace	Won	
2011	Dongfang Television Awards	Most Commercially Valuable Actress	—N/a	Won	
2011	MSN Fashion Party Award	Popular Celebrity Award	—N/a	Won	
2011	Fashion Power Awards	Most Popular Actress	—N/a	Won	
2011	Grand Ceremony of New Forces	Most Popular Film Actress	Mysterious Island	Won	
2011	Beijing Television Entertainment Ten Year Influential Award Ceremony	Popular New Star Award	—N/a	Won	
2011	3rd China TV Drama Awards	Popular Actress Award	—N/a	Won	
2012	Weibo Awards Ceremony	Most Influential TV Actress	—N/a	Won	
2012	Weibo Awards Ceremony	Weibo Queen	—N/a	Won	
2012	China Power Trust Fashion Award Ceremony	TV Actress of the Year	—N/a	Won	
2012	China Power Trust Fashion Award Ceremony	Influential Figure of the Year	—N/a	Won	
2012	Sohu Television Drama Awards	Most Popular Actress	—N/a	Won	
2012	2nd LeTV Entertainment Awards	Most Commercially Valuable Film Actress	—N/a	Won	
2012	Grazia Award Ceremony	Trendy Charisma Award	—N/a	Won	
2012	3rd China TV Drama Awards	Most Popular All-Rounded Artist	—N/a	Won	
2013	3rd Citizens Award	Citizen of the Year	—N/a	Won	
2013	Asian Influence Awards	Best Producer	V Love	Won	
2014	Fashion Power Awards	Most Popular Mainland Actress	—N/a	Won	
2015	Weibo Awards Ceremony	Breakthrough Award	—N/a	Won	
2015	The Women's Media Award	Influential Woman Award	—N/a	Won	
2015	Asian Influence Awards Oriental Ceremony	Influence Film Force Award	—N/a	Won	
2015	8th The Mango TV Awards	Most Popular Actress	—N/a	Won	
2015	4th iQiyi All-Star Carnival	Most Influential Film Actor	—N/a	Won	
2016	L'Officiel Fashion Night Influence Award	Most Popular Actress	—N/a	Won	
2016	23rd Cosmo Beauty Ceremony	Most Influential Idol	—N/a	Won	
2016	5th iQiyi All-Star Carnival	Most Influential Film Actor	—N/a	Won	
2017	iFensi Award Ceremony	Most Capable Female Artiste	—N/a	Won	
2017	2nd Weibo Movie Night	Most Anticipated Actress	—N/a	Won	
2017	6th iQiyi All-Star Carnival	Actress of the Year	—N/a	Won	
2017	11th Tencent Video Star Awards	VIP Star of the Year	—N/a	Won	
2017	11th Tencent Video Star Awards	Most Popular Female Celebrity	—N/a	Won	
2017	24th Cosmo Beauty Ceremony	Beautiful Figure of the Year	—N/a	Won	
2017	Sohu Fashion Awards	Television Actress of the Year	—N/a	Won	
2017	Sohu Fashion Awards	Most Popular Female Celebrity	—N/a	Won	
2017	Tencent Entertainment White Paper	Star of the Year	—N/a	Won	
2018	Weibo Awards Ceremony	Weibo Queen	—N/a	Won	
2018	China Screen Ranking	Trend of the Year	—N/a	Won	
2018	3rd China Television Drama Quality Ceremony	Audience's Favorite Quality Star	—N/a	Won	
2018	3rd China Television Drama Quality Ceremony	Most Anticipated Actress	—N/a	Won	
2018	25th Cosmo Beauty Ceremony	Shining Beautiful Idol	—N/a	Won	
2018	15th Esquire Man at His Best Awards	Most Popular Female Artiste	—N/a	Won	
2018	Youku Choice Awards	Most Valuable Star	—N/a	Won	
2018	12th Tencent Video Star Awards	TV Actress of the Year	—N/a	Won	
2019	China Literature Award Ceremony	Super IP Actress	Legend of Fuyao	Won	
2019	Weibo Awards Ceremony	Philanthropy Influential Figure	—N/a	Won	
2019	China Entertainment Industry Summit (Golden Pufferfish Awards)	Most Commercially Valuable Artist	—N/a	Won	
2019	StarHub Night of Stars 2019	Best Actress (China)	The Great Craftsman	Won	
2019	Golden Bud – The Fourth Network Film And Television Festival	Best Actress	The Great Craftsman	Nominated	
2019	Tencent Video All Star Awards	VIP Star	—N/a	Won	
2020	Weibo Awards Ceremony	Weibo Goddess	—N/a	Won	
2020	Weibo Awards Ceremony	Charity Influential Figure	—N/a	Won	
2020	Best Choice of Multi-Screen Communication	Influential Actress	The Great Craftsman	Won	

=== Forbes China Celebrity 100 ===
Year	Rank	Ref.
2011	92nd	
2012	13th	
2013	7th	
2014	6th	
2015	31st	
2017	3rd	
2019	9th	
2020	6th	
2021	4th	
