= Tiny Times (film series) =

Chinese film series

Tiny Times is a Chinese film series directed and written by Guo Jingming, all adapted from his novels.

The first installment of the series based on the first novel was released on June 27, 2013. A sequel titled Tiny Times 2, which was filmed together with the first film and based on the second half of the novel, was released on August 8, 2013. Tiny Times 3, the third installment of the franchise was released on July 17, 2014. Tiny Times 4, the fourth and last film of the series, was released on July 9, 2015. Though the series has received negative reviews from Chinese film critics, Tiny Times has become one of the most successful movie franchises, and has garnered many fans among young Chinese cinema-going audience.

== Characters ==
=== Central cast ===
Character	Actor	Introduction
Lin Xiao	Yang Mi (film); Ivy Chen (TV)	The protagonist and narrator of the story. After graduating as a Chinese literary major, she becomes an editorial assistant at ME magazine. Described as a girl-next-door, Lin Xiao is meek and lacks confidence but displays loyalty to her friends. She becomes involved with three men; high school sweetheart Li Yueming, colleague Zhou Chong Guang, and her workplace superior Gong Ming.
Gu Li (Lily)	Amber Kuo (film); Jiang Kaitong (TV)	A rich heiress who is also a capable business executive, holding double degrees in finance and accounting. Often referred to as "Queen" by her friends due to her cold exterior and commanding presence, Gu Li is strong-willed, level-headed and composed. She was dating high school sweetheart Gu Yuan, until they are mercilessly separated by Gu Yuan's mother.
Nan Xiang	Bea Hayden (film); Andrea Chen (TV)	A talented and beautiful artist who comes from a modest background. She struggles with making ends meet to finance her graduate studies in fashion design, while at the same time dealing with her abusive ex-boyfriend, Xi Cheng.
Tang Wan Ru (Ruby)	Evonne Hsieh (film); Xu Dongmei (TV)	A national level badminton star who has a silly personality and is hopelessly romantic. She falls in love with fellow athlete Wei Hai and tries to capture his attention.

=== Main cast ===
Character	Actor	Introduction
Gu Yuan	Kai Ko (film); Xu Yue (TV)	A rich and handsome heir of a business conglomerate. Although he is capable like his girlfriend Gu Li, he isn't as cold as her, and is more adept at handling people and relationships.
Zhou Chong Guang	Cheney Chen (film); Qiao Renliang (TV)	A talented but childish writer who writes articles for M.E. magazine. Though he has been neglected by his family since young, he is doted by his older brother, Gong Ming. He gradually falls in love with Lin Xiao as they work together, but a fatal illness prevents them from achieving their happy ending.
Lu Shao / Shaun	Cheney Chen	Zhou Chong Guang's new identity after he underwent extensive plastic surgery, as he faked death to avoid a financial crisis for his family. (**This character does not appear in the TV version)
Gong Ming	Rhydian Vaughan (film); Vivian Dawson (film); Peter Ho (TV)	Chief editor of M.E. Magazine and Lin Xiao's boss. A cold man and sharp man with weird quirks. He has great affection toward his younger brother, Zhou Chong Guang.
Xi Cheng	Jiang Chao (film); Wu Diwen (TV)	Nan Xiang's abusive ex-boyfriend. He becomes depressed after his mother's suicide, causing him to walk on the wrong path.
Wei Hai	Calvin Tu (film); Jin Shijia (TV)	A fellow badminton player who has a bright and sunny disposition. He is Wan Ru's crush, but later gets together with Nan Xiang.

=== Supporting cast ===
Character	Actor	Introduction
Neil	Lee Hyun-jae (film); Yang Yang (TV)	Gu Li's flamboyant half-Chinese, half-white younger cousin. He often gets on Gu Li's nerves. He falls for Gu Li's younger brother, Gu Zhun.
Jian Xi	Li Yueming (film); Li Yifeng (TV)	Lin Xiao's high school sweetheart. In the process of helping repay Lin Xiao's debt, he gets closer to Lin Quan, and cheats on her. He tries to earn Lin Xiao's forgiveness but backs off after noticing the relationship between Lin Xiao and Chong Guang.
Gu Zhun	Ming Ren	The illegitimate younger brother of Gu Li, who later finds himself as Neil's object of affection. (**This character does not appear in the TV version)
Kitty	Kiwi Shang (film); Zhang Yujie (TV)	Gong Ming's capable and snarky assistant.
Ye Chuanping	Wang Lin (film); Ma Rui (TV)	Gu Yuan's domineering and bossy mother, who attempted to foil Gu Li and Gu Yuan's relationship multiple times.
Lin Quan	Yolanda Yang (film); Li Chun (TV)	The sister of a deceased victim, who has been forced into desperation by Gu Li and Lin Xiao and committed suicide. She comes to seek revenge against Gu Li and Lin Xiao, and steals Lin Xiao's boyfriend, Jian Xi away from her.
Yuan Yi	Ding Qiaowei (film); Zhang Teng (TV)	Gu Yuan's matchmaking partner.

== Critical reviews ==
=== Materialism ===
The series has been slammed for its overt celebration of materialism.; as well as the product placement of luxury brands in the films. Film critic Raymond Chou said the film's message is "hinting to the young generation that you can do anything to win material goods because that’s how your value is determined."

=== Depiction of women ===
The series has sparked controversy and debate over its depiction of women in the film. Though often compared with Sex and the City, critics argue the women in Tiny Times does not exhibit the same kind of fierceness and independence as their Western counterparts. Critics have expressed their concerns that Shanghainese women in the film are portrayed as "vapid and shallow", setting backwards gender equality in China.

At the same time, the series has been condemned for its portrayal of male narcissism. The Atlantic said that the films speak to "the male fantasy of a world of female yearnings, which revolve around men and the goods men are best equipped to deliver, whether materially or bodily. It betrays a twisted male narcissism and a male desire for patriarchal power and control over female bodies and emotions misconstrued as female longing; which is symptomatic of a society where the choices for women are severely limited."

=== Content ===
In spite of negative reviews, the series has garnered praises for its glossy cinematography and production value.

=== Performance ===
The film has been criticized for the acting ability of the cast. Lead actress Yang Mi has been nominated thrice (and won for all three times) at the Golden Broom Awards as the "Most Disappointing Actress" for her performance in Tiny Times franchise.

== Reflection on China's societal trends ==
Demographic changes in China has led to the production of similar teen films. Stephen Cremin of Film Business Asia said it is “the first high-profile film to appeal primarily to the generation born in the 1990s who’ve become the main moviegoing audience in China”. Cremin compares the controversy to the first opening of McDonald's in China, which faced opposition from the older generation but was soon assimilated into China's ever-changing film landscape.

== Commercial success ==
Despite its negative reviews and criticism, the film has enjoyed commercial success. The first installment of the film breaks the opening-day box office record for a Chinese-language 2D release.

This is credited to its strong teenage and young adult fanbase, who are lured by the film's attractive stars and glamorous Shanghai setting. The People's Daily was critical of the film and said Guo had "cleverly gotten hold of his own target audience -- the vast teenage demographic." Research conducted by the producers enables Guo to make commercial films that successfully cater to the new generation of young Chinese, who have Western-style values.
