= Line Romance =

- Also known as: Love Line
- Genre: Miniseries
- Written by: Kim Mi-sook; Jang Seon-ah
- Directed by: Choi Jong-soo; Jang Soo-bong
- Starring: Lee Min-ho; Kuo Bea-ting
- Country of origin: China
- Original language: Korean
- No. of episodes: 3

Production
- Production location: China
- Production company: HB Entertainment

Original release
- Network: iQiyi
- Release: 9 May – 16 May 2014

Line Romance (Korean: 라인 로맨스) also known as Love Line, is a 2014 Korean television mini-drama starring Lee Min-ho and Kuo Bea-ting. It is a story of a female Chinese tourist named Ling Ling, who goes to Korea and falls in love with Min-ho, a music producer with both talent and good looks. Due to their language barrier, the two people use the mobile messenger app LINE to communicate with one another.

== Synopsis ==
Min-ho (Lee Min-ho) is a musician who met Ling Ling (Bea Hayden) on his walk and got inspired to write a new song. He then made a silly mistake by sending her a text message saying he loved her.

== Cast ==
- Lee Min-ho as Min-ho
- Kuo Bea-ting as Ling Ling
- Kim Bo-mi as Min-ho's stylist
- Kim Kang-hyun as Min-ho's manager

== International broadcast ==
- The show aired four days, CTR collected was US$20 million. Producers official said, "just an ad miniseries will be able to hit such a high CTR, has once again proven the popularity of Lee Min-ho".
- In Thailand, it aired on Workpoint TV.
