= Mysterious Island (2011 film) =

- Directed by: Rico Chung
- Written by: Lan Yang
- Produced by: Chris Liu
- Starring: Jordan Chan; Yang Mi; Hayama Go; Janel Tsai
- Cinematography: Parkie Chan
- Edited by: Chan Ki-hop
- Music by: An Wei
- Release date: July 8, 2011 (China)
- Running time: 97 minutes
- Country: China
- Language: Mandarin
- Budget: $2 million

Mysterious Island (孤島驚魂) is a 2011 Chinese horror film directed by Rico Chung. The film is about a group of people invited to a Survivor styled television program on the Binlusai islands. On arriving there they lose their luggage and come across a message stating that they will all be killed.

The film was a commercial success in China where it grossed over $10 million in comparison to its $2 million budget.

== Plot ==
In the 1970s on the Binlusai islands, a young mother is killed when she was running with her son from an evil presence in an abandoned Roman Catholic leper colony. In the present day, a group of four young men and women are travelling to the island to take part in a survival game run by TV channel Search Planet headed by Chen Jiadong (Philip Keung). Also on the boat is the television presenter Stanley (Jessica Xu) and cameraman Ken (Shaun Tam). The eight people have been split into four pairs where they are given a map which leads to a flag; their aim is to survive without any supplies, and the winning duo gets a grand prize of one-million dollars. As they approach the island, their ship is attacked by something unknown under the water and most of their luggage is lost. Shen Yilin (Yang Mi) has preserved her map which she gives to her partner Peng Fei (Jordan Chan). The group is immediately attacked by wild boars. One of the boars is killed by Japanese competitor Ono Hiroshi (Hayama Hiro) with his hunting knife. That night they stumble across the remains of the leper colony, where a message written in Chinese on a stained-glass window in the chapel states that they will be killed. Funeral urns appear with each of their names written on them.

Later that night, Guan Zhichun (Janel Tsai) and Tina (Maggie Lee) try to get Peng Fei to hand over the map while Yilin tries to persuade him to return it to her. Peng Fei is then attacked by an unknown force and disappears. Meanwhile, Chen Liangliang (Anya Wu) has found a notebook hidden in the building. Zhang Xiaolong (Wong You-nam) has an idea to figure out what is happening but everyone suddenly passes out. The next morning, Shi Nan (Tsui Yin-yau) is found to have blood on his shoes but denies that he is the killer. After Liangliang goes missing with the notebook, chaos breaks out among the group.

== Release ==
Mysterious Island was originally slated for a release in May 2011 in both Hong Kong and China. The film's original title translates into Scary Spirit on a Desert Island which is the Chinese title for the popular 2004 first-person shooter video game Far Cry.

Mysterious Island was released in China on July 8, 2011. The film grossed a RMB24.3 million ($3.8 million) in China on its opening weekend attracting teenage and student audiences predominantly. In its second week, the film grossed RMB41.3 million ($6.4 million) in China. The film has grossed $5,254 in Hong Kong and $31,159 in Malaysia The film was the highest grossing Chinese horror film on its theatrical release.

In 2013, the film Mysterious Island 2 was released which does not follow the plot or have the same cast as Mysterious Island.

== Reception ==
Film Business Asia gave the film a five out of ten rating, referring to the film as "poorly written but okay on a throwaway thrills level".
