= Legend of Fuyao =

2018 Chinese TV series

- Drama poster
- Genre: Fantasy; Adventure; Romance
- Based on: Empress Fuyao by Tianxia Guiyuan
- Written by: Jie Yanyan
- Directed by: Yang Wenjun; Xie Ze; Li Cai
- Starring: Yang Mi; Ethan Juan
- Country of origin: China
- Original language: Mandarin
- No. of seasons: 1
- No. of episodes: 66

Production
- Producer: Yang Xiaopei
- Production locations: Hengdian World Studios; Yinchuan
- Running time: 45 mins
- Production companies: Linmon Pictures; Tencent Penguin Pictures

Original release
- Network: Zhejiang TV
- Release: June 18 – August 13, 2018

Legend of Fuyao (Chinese: 扶摇) is a 2018 Chinese television series based on the novel Empress Fuyao (Chinese: 扶摇皇后) by Tianxia Guiyuan. It stars Yang Mi and Ethan Juan. The series aired on Zhejiang TV from June 18 to August 13, 2018.

== Synopsis ==
The story takes place in the universe of Five Kingdoms that is led by the Imperial City of Tianquan. Fuyao was formed from a lotus borne by the Ancient firmament. Adopted as an orphan, she served as a slave for the Xuanyuan sect from the Taiyuan Kingdom. A series of tragedies resulted in a journey across the land to gather the magical artifacts that could lift the curse that blighted her life. Along the way, she met the Crown Prince of Tianquan who was masquerading as the heir of Taiyuan while conducting secret missions to quell unrest in the Five Kingdoms. The pair fell in love as they battled the complicated politics and power plays between the different forces. With the help of her loyal companions, Fuyao set out to unravel the heinous plot of the ancient firmament. She discovered her real identity as the "Lotus Princess" and succeeded in destroying the evil forces, bringing peace to the land of Five Kingdoms.

== Cast ==
=== Main ===
Actor	Character	Introduction
Yang Mi	Fuyao (扶摇); Feng Wuming (凤无名)	A woman born from a divine lotus petal and owner of the five-colored stone. She was a lowly servant at Xuanyuan Sect, until she learned an invincible fighting technique named "Po Jiu Xiao" and began her journey to gather the five magical artifacts to break the five seals that were put on her. She was revealed to be the true Lotus princess and ascends the throne to become the Queen of Xuanji. Fuyao also simultaneously holds the title of Tiansha's King of Han as well as Magistrate of Yao City.
Ethan Juan	Zhangsun Wuji (长孙无极); Yuan Zhaoxu (元昭诩)	Crown Prince of Tianquan kingdom. He is the descendant of Chang Qingzi, Grand Mentor of the Ancient Firmament; and is the owner of the Xuanling True Leaf. Wuji also owns a magical pet hamster named Yuan Bao. Yuan Zhaoxu is Wuji's alias as the Crown Prince's assistant.

=== Supporting ===
==== Taiyuan kingdom ====
Actor	Character	Introduction
Taiyuan Royal Family
Zhang Dongshen	Xuanyuan Ren (轩辕韧)	King of Taiyuan.
Hu Ke	Xuanyuan Xiao (轩辕晓)	Elder princess of Taiyuan. Zhangsun Jia's wife.
Lai Yi	Zong Yue (宗越)	A well-known medicine practitioner. His identity is actually the elder son of Prince Wenyi, the previous heir apparent of Taiyuan; and was saved by Fei Yan, who imparted divine medical skills to him in exchange for forty years of his lifespan.
Liang Yimu	Yun Hen (云痕)	Qi Zhen's god-son later revealed to be the younger son of Prince Wenyi and Zong Yue's younger brother. He became the King of Taiyuan following Qi Zhen's failed coup attempt. He has a one-sided love for Qi Yun, whom he grew up with.
Ethan Juan (fake); Quan Peilun (real)	Xuanyuan Min (轩辕旻)	Heir apparent of Taiyuan, later King. Wuji disguises himself as Xuanyuan Min in order to expose Qi Zhen's real intentions and foil his plans to usurp the throne.
Yang Mi (fake); Chen Xinwen (real)	Yuwen Zi (宇文紫)	Xuanyuan Min's concubine (Pure Consort). Daughter of Yuwen Jian, a distant relative of Qi Zhen; and later Qi Zhen's god-daughter. Fuyao disguised herself as Yuwen Zi in order to sneak into Qi Zhen's manor and look for Xiao Qi.
Aliya	Tang Zhirong (唐芷蓉)	Xuanyuan Min's concubine (Noble Consort). Daughter of Tang Bonian. She's a cold and cunning woman who will do anything to become Queen.
Wei Huini	Jian Xue (简雪)	Xuanyuan Min's concubine (Virtuous Consort). Daughter of Jian Shen, Imperial Secretary of Han Lin Court. She is secretly Zhangsun Wuji's aide.
Liu Zhiwei	Gao Purou (高普若)	Xuanyuan Min's concubine (Able Consort). Daughter of Gao Hao, Prince Xiping. She later becomes the Queen following Yun Hen's ascension to the throne due to a deal between her father and Zhang Henian.
Liu Yinglun	Xuanyuan Hui (轩辕晖)	A prince disguised by Tai Yan as part of Wuji's plan to trick Qi Zhen.
Liu Dashen	Xuanyuan Zhai (轩辕斋)	Prince of Taiyuan.
Kunjing City
Liu Yijun	Qi Zhen (齐震)	State preceptor of Taiyuan. He is manipulative and calculating. He would do anything to become the ruler of Taiyuan.
Yuan Yuxuan	Qi Yun (齐韵)	Qi Zhen's daughter. She is in love with Zong Yue, her childhood friend.
Sun Qiang	Zhang Henian (章鹤年)	Imperial Censor. A patriotic and loyal man.
Liu Guanlin	Gao Hao (高蒿)	Prince Xiping. He is in cahoots with Qi Zhen, but both are distrustful of one another.
Liu Hanzhong	Tang Bonian (唐伯年)	Dingyuan General.
Zhong Weihua	Cao Cheng (曹成)	Head eunuch. A secret messenger of Qi Zhen.
Liu Fenglan	Wei Chuan (魏川)	Housekeeper of Qi manor.
Zhou Liwei	Shi Lan (时岚)	Yuwen Zi (Fuyao)'s maid. She was sent by Zhangsun Wuji to protect Fuyao, knowing that Yuwen Zi is actually Fuyao in disguise.
Wuyu Chenning	Ah Lie (阿烈)	Pei Yuan's maid. She secretly hates Pei Yuan due to the former's mistreatment of her. She is responsible for ruining Pei Yuan's face and eventually killing her.
Zhang Zhizhong	Mr. Qiu (邱先生)	Prince Wenyi's former subordinate. He saved Zong Yue and Yun Hen's lives by sneaking them away during the massacre. He later revealed the truth behind their identities.
Lu Xianjun	Huan'er (欢儿)	Tang Zhirong's maid.
Xuanyuan sect
Li Hongtao	Yan Lie (燕烈)	Leader of Xuanyuan Sect and Yan Jingchen's father.
Huang Youming	Yan Jingchen (燕惊尘)	Senior disciple of Xuanyuan Sect. He is Fuyao's first love. Despite his feelings for her, he was forced to leave her to marry Pei Yuan due to his father's wishes.
Li Yixiao	Pei Yuan (裴媛)	Qi Zhen's niece. Yan Jingchen's disciple junior and wife. She has a one-sided and obsessive love for Yan Jingchen. When she realizes that Yan Jingchen is deeply in love with Fuyao, she is bent on destroying the latter.
Qin Yan	Uncle Zhou (周叔); Sheng Ling (圣灵)	Head of Xuanyou faction. A fatherlike figure to Fuyao. His identity was revealed to be Sheng Ling, who ranks 2nd out of the 10 saints. He saved Fuyao and helped her unlock the "Po Jiu Xiao" fighting technique.
Jiang Long	Xiao Qi (小七)	A servant of Xuanyou faction. Fuyao's best friend and companion. He has a crush on Yalan Zhu.
Guo Jun	Teacher Pei Yan (佩彦师叔)	Yan Lie's subordinate. An elder at Xuanyuan Sect.
He Yutong	Second disciple sister (二师姐)	
Wang Zhipeng	Li Yunxiao (李云霄)	Fourth disciple brother.
Zhao Zuoshan	Elder (制赛长老)	

==== Tianquan kingdom ====
Actor	Character	Introduction
Tianquan Royal City
Wang Jinsong	Zhangsun Jiong (长孙迥)	Emperor of Tianquan and Ruler of the Five Continents. A well-respected man who groomed Zhangsun Wuji for the role of Crown Prince since a young age, but actually hides a dark secret.
Juan Zi	Yuan Qingyi (元清漪)	Empress Ci'en. Zhangsun Wuji's mother. She and Zhangsun Jia are secretly in love with each other, but she was forced to marry Zhangsun Jiong.
Song Jialun	Zhangsun Jia (长孙迦)	Prince Virtue. Younger brother of Zhangsun Jiong. Zhangsun Wuji's biological father.
Zhao Chulun	Zhangsun Pingrong (长孙平戎)	Prince Yi. Zhangsun Wuji's half brother. An ambitious man who would resort to any means to usurp the throne.
Sun Wei	Duan Tong (段潼)	Prime Minister. He is aligned with Zhangsun Pingrong.
Gao Haipeng	Lei Yuanshan (雷元山)	Junwei General. He is loyal to Zhangsun Wuji.
Zhang Honggang	Han Lin (韩林)	Zhangsun Jiong's personal attendant.
Gao Hanyu	Jiang Feng (江枫)	Zhangsun Wuji's loyal subordinate. A "shadow" guard.
Yu Yonghai	Xu Lai (涂来)	Zhangsun Pingrong's subordinate.
Liu Yuqi	Hong Ying (红灜)	A courtesan who is secretly a spy for Zhangsun Jiong, but is in love with Zhangsun Jia.
Yao City
Jia Benchu	Tie Cheng (铁成)	A warrior of Yao City who becomes Fuyao's subordinate and later Magistrate of Yao City.
Yan Luhan	Hu Sang (胡桑)	A woman who fell in love at first sight with Zhangsun Wuji and harbors hatred for Fuyao due to this.
Tang Guozhong	Chi Gui (赤鬼)	Leader of Hei Rong tribe. He conspires with Zhangsun Pingrong to usurp Yao City and stage a rebellion.
Xu Fei	Hei Feng (黑风)	Chi Gui's subordinate.
Luo Ting	Magistrate Su (苏县丞)	Previous Magistrate of Yao City.

==== Tiansha kingdom ====
Actor	Character	Introduction
Gao Weiguang	Zhan Beiye (战北野)	Prince Lie, leader of the Black Wind troops. Later the King of Tiansha. He admires Fuyao due to her courage and loyalty, but falls for Yalan Zhu's sincerity.
Zhang Yaqin	Yalan Zhu (雅兰珠)	Princess of Qiongye, later the Queen of Tiansha. She liked Zhan Beiye since they were young and follows him wherever he goes. She also befriends Fuyao and becomes close to her.
Zhang Yicong	Zhan Nancheng (战南成)	King of Tiansha. A man who is thirsty for power and uses underhanded means to achieve his goals.
Gu Youming	Zhan Beiheng (战北恒)	Prince Heng. He is loyal to his elder brother, Zhan Nancheng.
Chen Ying	Consort Jing (静妃)	Zhan Beiye's birth mother.
Liu Deliang	Lei Dong (雷动)	Zhan Beiye's teacher. Ranks 3rd out of the 10 saints.
Liu Qiushi	Ji Yu (纪羽)	Zhan Beiye's second-in-command, whom he is loyal to.
Tan Xizhi	Eunuch Hua (花公公)	Zhan Beiye's aide who was placed in the palace by his maternal grandfather..
Liu Yang	Attendant Li (李总管)	Head eunuch.
Yang Zhenyu	Gu Lingfeng (古凌风)	Commander of "Gold of Tiansha" army.
Mao Fan	Commander of Ming Troops (冥军首领)	Commander of the "Black Wind Hidden Troops".
Sheng Wu	Lin Yi (林易)	Zhan Beiye's subordinate who later betrays him.

==== Xuanji kingdom ====
Actor	Character	Introduction
Lin Jing	Feng Xuan (凤璇)	Queen of Xuanji.
Lin Jing	Feng Qi (凤琦)	Feng Xuan's twin sister. The true heir of the Xuanji throne and Fuyao's birth mother.
Cao Weiyu	Yu Heng (玉衡); Meng Shuo (孟朔)	One of the 10 saints. Feng Qi's husband and Fuyao's birth father. He stays by Feng Xuan's side as her shadow guard in order to find out the truth of Feng Qi and Feng Wuming (Fuyao)'s whereabouts.
Li Duo	Feng Wu (凤五)	Fifth elder prince. Son of the previous King.
Gao Liwen	Feng Jingzhi (凤净执)	First princess.
Wang Herun	Feng Jingfan (凤净梵); Fo Lian (佛莲)	Second princess. Known as the Saintess of the five continents. Fei Yan's disciple. A cunning and evil woman who stole Fuyao's identity as the "Lotus Princess" and puts up a kind and benevolent pretense. She has a one-sided love for Zhangsun Wuji.
Xue Yuru	Yu Meisheng (玉梅笙)	First female general of Xuanji. Feng Jingzhi's most trusted follower.
Chen Junyu	Tang Yizhong (唐易中)	Guard of Feng Yin Pavilion. A descendant of the Feng family.
Zhao Xin	Qiao Ling (巧灵)	Fo Lian's maid.
Zhang Huanhuan	Xu Wan (许婉)	Feng Qi's maid who secretly saved Feng Wuming (Fuyao) and hid her in the palace closet.

==== Ancient Firmament ====
Actor	Character	Introduction
Liu Sha	Tian Ji (天机)	High immortal of Ancient Firmament, Lord of Changqing Immortal Shrine. Leader of the 10 strongest saints. Zhangsun Wuji's teacher.
Liu Xuan	Fei Yan (非烟)	High immortal of Ancient Firmament, Lord of Huansheng Shrine. Granddaughter of Di Feitian. Her main goal is to revive Di Feitian, by using Fuyao and her five-colored stone to bring upon chaos to the Five Continents.
Liu Yinglun	Tai Yan (太妍)	Fei Yan's disciple. She has an unrequited love for Wuji.

== Production ==
=== Casting and filming ===
During Linmon Picture's annual television production showcase in February 2017, Yang Mi was announced to be the female lead for upcoming project Legend of Fuyao. Fuyao was said to contain eastern elements of fantasy, with its plot containing exciting political maneuvers and modern values of relationship.

In June 2017, Ethan Juan was announced to play the male lead. Both Juan and Yang announced their roles through their respective Weibo account. Major supporting cast members were unveiled through picture stills in July 2017.

The series began filming on 27 June 2017 in Hengdian World Studios, and wrapped up on November 24, 2017.

=== Crew ===
The series is produced by Linmon Pictures and directed by Magnolia Award-winner Yang Wenjun (Divorce Lawyers). Other notable cast members include martial arts choreographer Li Cai (Hero, House of Flying Daggers), art director Shao Changyong (Nirvana in Fire, The Disguiser) and two-time Golden Horse Award winner Stanley Cheung as its costume designer.

=== Location ===
The series is primarily filmed in Hengdian World Studios as well as Yinchuan. Numerous sets were built in a piece of barren land of up to 60,000 square meters.

== Soundtrack ==
No.	Title	Lyrics	Music	Singers	Length
1.	"Fuyao (扶摇)" (Opening theme song)	Chen Xi	Dongdong Dong	Karen Mok
2.	"Flourishing Dream (繁华梦)"	Lin Hai	Song Yang	Isabelle Huang
3.	"Blood like Ink (血如墨)"	Chen Xi	Dongdong Dong	Zhang Bichen
4.	"Proud Humans of Society (傲红尘)"	Chen Xi	Dongdong Dong	You Zhangjing (Nine Percent)
5.	"Window (窗)" (Ending theme song 2)	Greeny Wu	Greeny Wu	Greeny Wu
6.	"Youth (少年)"	Chen Xi	Dongdong Dong	Sun Jun
7.	"A Love is Hard to Wish for (一爱难求)" (Ending theme song 1)	Chen Xi	Dongdong Dong	Lala Hsu

== Reception ==
Fuyao was praised by CCTV media for transmitting positive values and messages such as persistence, independence and magnanimity; as well as encouraging people to chase after their dreams.

Despite divided reviews, the series' popularity remains high domestically with high online views; as well as acclaim from overseas fans. In particular, the series was highly praised in the Daily Pakistan newspaper, with the media outlet calling the show "a wonderful presentation of Chinese characteristics" and praising its cinematography. It gained 14 billion views in 50 days, becoming the most viewed online drama of the summer season.

=== Ratings ===
Episode #	Original broadcast date	Average audience share (CSM52)		Ranking	Average audience share (National Average)		Ranking
Episode #	Original broadcast date	Ratings	Audience share	Ranking	Ratings	Audience share	Ranking
1-2	June 18, 2018	0.655	3.727	1	0.35	2.57	1
3-4	June 19, 2018	0.611	3.742	2	0.23	1.85	2
5-6	June 20, 2018	0.655	4.174	2	0.32	2.63	2
7-8	June 21, 2018	0.691	4.194	1	0.392	3.047	1
9-10	June 25, 2018	0.755	4.563	1	0.38	2.97	1
11-12	June 26, 2018	0.664	3.997	1	0.33	2.55	2
13-14	June 27, 2018	0.673	3.327	1	0.44	2.64	1
15-16	June 28, 2018	0.753	4.346	1	0.34	2.42	1
17-18	July 2, 2018	0.648	3.53	1	0.37	2.68	2
19-20	July 3, 2018	0.689	3.984	1	0.49	3.6	1
21-22	July 4, 2018	0.941	6.029	1	0.57	4.4	1
23-24	July 5, 2018	0.927	5.964	1	0.7	5.23	1
25-26	July 9, 2018	0.789	5.108	2	0.441	3.478	2
27-28	July 10, 2018	0.795	4.8	2	0.525	3.703	2
29-30	July 11, 2018	1.088	6.553	1	0.71	4.93	2
31-32	July 12, 2018	0.951	5.832	1	0.65	4.77	1
33-34	July 16, 2018	0.951	6.089	1	0.523	3.876	2
35-36	July 17, 2018	0.972	6.123	1	0.61	4.328	2
37-38	July 18, 2018	1.017	6.243	1	0.6	4.35	2
39-40	July 19, 2019	1.073	6.77	1	0.68	5.03	2
41-42	July 23, 2018	0.795	5.106	2	0.58	4.29	2
43-44	July 24, 2018	0.844	5.33	2	0.52	3.91	2
45-46	July 25, 2018	0.923	5.777	2	0.61	4.48	2
47-48	July 26, 2018	0.879	5.588	1	0.64	4.85	1
49-50	July 30, 2018	0.87	5.796	2	0.49	3.78	2
51-52	July 31, 2018	0.842	5.448	2	0.6	4.39	2
53-54	August 1, 2018	0.799	5.137	2	0.5	3.73	2
55-56	August 2, 2018	0.91	5.752	1	0.6	4.46	1
57-58	August 6, 2018	0.908	6.135	1	0.61	4.76	2
59-60	August 7, 2018	0.782	5.292	1	0.55	4.09	2
61-62	August 8, 2018	0.847	5.46	1	0.66	4.81	2
63-64	August 9, 2018	0.868	5.632	1	0.56	4.19	1
65-66	August 13, 2018	0.786	4.91	1	0.6	4.31	2
Average	—N/a	0.84	5.2	—N/a	0.6	4.31	—N/a

Note: Part of the series is broadcast online on Tencent Video before airing on Zhejiang TV. VIP members of Tencent are four episodes ahead of non-VIP members and regular television broadcast.

== Awards and nominations ==
Award	Category	Nominated work	Result	Ref.
24th Huading Awards	Best Actor (Ancient Drama)	Ethan Juan	Nominated	
24th Huading Awards	Best Actress (Ancient Drama)	Yang Mi	Nominated	
12th Tencent Video Star Awards	Best Television Series	Legend of Fuyao	Won	
