= Kim Bo-mi =

South Korean actress (born 1987)

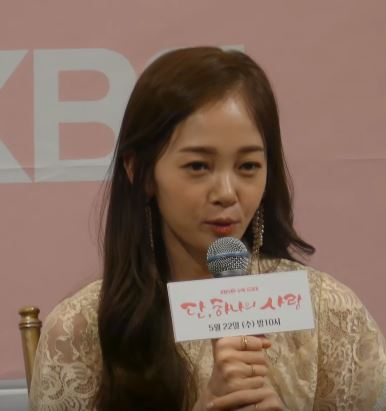
- Kim in 2019
- Born: May 15, 1987 (age 39); Suwon, South Korea
- Education: Sejong University - Ballet
- Occupation: Actress
- Years active: 2008–present
- Agent(s): Sol & People
- Spouse: Yoon Jeon-il (m. 2020)
- Children: 2

Korean name
- Hangul: 김보미
- Hanja: 金甫美
- RR: Gim Bomi
- MR: Kim Pomi

Kim Bo-mi (Korean: 김보미; born May 15, 1987) is a South Korean actress. Kim began studying ballet when she was 11 years old, and she later enrolled in Dance at Sejong University, with Ballet as her major subject. Then in 2008, she appeared in the cable show Star Replication Project 2%, which led to an exclusive contract with an entertainment agency. Kim made her acting debut that same year in Painter of the Wind, as the maid of a gisaeng. She has since appeared in supporting roles in films and television dramas, notably the blockbuster film Sunny (2011) and the popular drama My Love from the Star (2013).

== Filmography ==
=== Film ===
Year	Title	Role	Notes
2010	Death Bell 2: Bloody Camp	Kyung-hee	
2011	Sunny	teenage Ryu Bok-hee	
2012	Whatcha Wearin'?	Yoon-mi	
2014	Mr. Perfect	Yi-hwa	
2014	Brownie	Na Bing-bing	
2017	The Merciless		Cameo

=== Television series ===
Year	Title	Role	Notes	Ref.
2008	Painter of the Wind	Mak-nyeon		
2011	My Daughter the Flower	Joo Hong-dan		
2013	Gu Family Book	Dam	Cameo (episode 1)	
2013	Basketball	Mi-sook		
2013	Master's Sun	Sun-young	Cameo (episode 5)	
2013	My Love from the Star	Min-ah		
2014	Doctor Stranger	Kim Ah-young		
2014	Line Romance	Min-ho's stylist		
2014	My Secret Hotel	Heo Young-mi		
2015	A Girl Who Sees Smells	Convenience store clerk	Cameo (episode 1)	
2015	Assembly	Song So-min		
2016	Local Hero	So-mi		
2017	Man to Man	Park Song-i		
2018	My Contracted Husband, Mr. Oh	Bang Jung-mi		
2019	Angel's Last Mission: Love	Geum Ni-na		

=== Web series ===
Year	Title	Role	Ref.
2019	I Hate You, Juliet	Lee Young-joo	

=== Television show ===
Year	Title	Notes
2008	Star Replication Project 2%	Contestant
2013	Star Recipe	Host

=== Music video appearance ===
Year	Song title	Artist
2011	"O.K."	B1A4
