= Sie Yi-lin =

Taiwanese actress

- 謝依霖
- Born: 19 March 1990 (age 36); Yuli, Hualien, Taiwan
- Other names: Evonne Sie, Hold住姐
- Education: Chinese Culture University
- Occupation: Actress
- Years active: 2011–present

Sie Yi-lin (Chinese: 謝依霖; pinyin: Xiè Yīlín; born 19 March 1990), also known as Evonne Sie, is a Taiwanese actress. Sie made her acting debut in Chinese film series Tiny Times (2013-2015), which helped her achieve popularity in the Greater China region.

== Filmography ==
=== Films ===
- Tiny Times (2013)
- Tiny Times 2 (2013)
- Dating Fever (2013)
- My Boy 4 Friends (2013)
- Tiny Times 3 (2014)
- Women Who Flirt (2014)
- Love Evolutionism (2014)
- Running Man (2015)
- You Are My Sunshine (2015)
- Tiny Times 4 (2015)
- Love Godfathers —Three naughty boys (2016)
- Mission Milano (2016)
- A Nail Clipper Romance (2017)
- Didi's Dream (2017)
- The Faces of My Gene (2018)
- Lost in Love (2019)
- Always Miss You (2019)

=== Television ===
- Nice to Meet You (2012)
- PMAM (2013)
- Never Give Up Dodo (2013)
- Love Weaves Through a Millennium (2015)
- Win the World (2017)
