= Unforgettable Blast =

- 迷与狂
- Directed by: Yan Tinglu
- Release date: May 22, 2015
- Running time: 100 minutes
- Country: China
- Language: Mandarin
- Box office: CN¥0.71 million (China)

Unforgettable Blast (Chinese: 迷与狂) is a 2015 Chinese comedy film directed by Yan Tinglu. It was released in China on May 22, 2015.

== Cast ==
- Jiang Chao
- Jiang Xueming
- Wang Xia
- Yang Qing
- Luo Jia
- Jiang Yihong
- Lei Di

== Reception ==
By May 23, 2015, the film had earned CN¥0.71 million at the Chinese box office.
