= Reset (2017 film) =

- Theatrical release poster
- Simplified Chinese: 逆时营救
- Literal meaning: Reverse time rescue
- Hanyu Pinyin: Nì shí yíngjiù
- Directed by: Chang
- Screenplay by: Zha Muchun
- Produced by: Jackie Chan
- Starring: Yang Mi; Wallace Huo
- Cinematography: Choi Chan-min
- Edited by: Kim Sang-bum; Kim Jae-beom
- Music by: Bang Jun-seok
- Production companies: New Clues Film; Jay Walk Studios; Beijing Sparkle Roll Media Corporation
- Distributed by: Star Cinema (Philippines)
- Release date: 29 June 2017
- Running time: 106 minutes
- Country: China
- Language: Mandarin
- Box office: $29.8 million

Reset (Chinese: 逆时营救) is a 2017 Chinese science fiction thriller film produced by Jackie Chan and directed by Korean director Chang; starring Yang Mi and Wallace Huo. The story follows a scientist who uses an experimental universe-hopping/time-travel technology to save her son from being killed. It was released in China on 29 June 2017.

== Plot ==
Xia Tian (Yang Mi) is a research scientist with Nexus Corporation. Her team, under the leadership of the Director (King Shih-Chieh), are working on wormhole technology to allow people to travel to parallel universes. However, the technology in its current state causes test animals to become aggressive and their cells to break down. IPT Lab, a competing agency that was working on the same technology, hires Tsui Hu (Wallace Huo) to steal Nexus's research.

Tsui Hu kidnaps Xia Tian's son, Dou Dou (Hummer Zhang) and gives Xia Tian one hour to bring him all the research. Xia Tian gets the research but is late reaching Tsui Hu, so he kills Dou Dou. Unable to live without her son, Xia Tian returns to the Nexus building, where she uses the particle accelerator to travel to a parallel universe, but back in time by one hour and fifty minutes.

In the second universe, Xia Tian takes her doppelgänger's place and, knowing how events play out, is quicker about getting the research to Tsui Hu. She recovers Dou Dou, but tricks Tsui Hu by giving him fake data. Tsui Hu chases the pair down and kills Dou Dou.

Xia Tian travels to a third universe, which now has three versions of her. The original Xia Tian (#1), who has become highly aggressive, arrives just as her second doppelgänger (#2) has cheated Tsui Hu and recovered Dou Dou. The two Xia Tians work together to avoid Tsui Hu and his goons, and Dou Dou is safely sent away to a hospital.

The three Xia Tians then learn that the Director is working with Tsui Hu, out of anger from being fired and the project handed over to Xia Tian. The Director suggested kidnapping Dou Dou to punish Xia Tian and force her to prove that the technology worked. Tsui Hu is also revealed to have been one of the test subjects at IPT Lab, and hopes to travel to a universe where he can save his wife and child. In a confrontation over the research data, Tsui Hu kills the Director, and is shot himself by Xia Tian #1. As he dies, Tsui Hu warns the women that the test subjects at IPT Lab turned on each other, and the women will do the same.

The three women have a standoff in the Nexus lab, with Xia Tian #1 determined to be the only one left to be with Dou Dou. She is killed by Xia Tian #2, who has accepted that she will die from cell deterioration. Xia Tian #3, who has not traveled across universes and is unchanged, is allowed to leave for the hospital, where she is reunited with Dou Dou. Left alone in the Nexus Lab which is about to explode, Xia Tian #2 turns on the particle accelerator, but it is unclear if she traveled to another universe, or if she died in the explosion.

A year later, the surviving Xia Tian is unemployed but living a happy, simple life with Dou Dou.

== Cast ==
- Yang Mi as Xia Tian
- Wallace Huo as Tsui Hu
- Chin Shih-chieh as Research Director
- Liu Chang as Da Xiong
- Hummer Zhang as Dou Dou

== Reception ==
=== Critical reception ===
On review aggregator website Rotten Tomatoes, the film holds an approval rating of 50% based on 8 reviews, and an average rating of 5.9/10.

=== Box office ===
The film has grossed more than CN¥200 million in China.

=== Awards and nominations ===
| Year | Award | Category | Nominee | Result | Ref. |
|---|---|---|---|---|---|
| 2017 | 50th World-Fest Houston International Film Festival | Best Film | | Won | |
| 2017 | 50th World-Fest Houston International Film Festival | Best Actress | Yang Mi | Won | |
| 2017 | Jackie Chan Action Movie Awards | Best Action Movie Actress | Yang Mi | Won | |

== See also ==
- List of films featuring time loops
