= The Starry Night, The Starry Sea =

- 那片星空那片海
- Genre: Fantasy; Romance
- Based on: The Starry Night, The Starry Sea by Tong Hua
- Written by: Qian Jingjing; Xu Ziyuan
- Directed by: Wei Hantao
- Starring: Feng Shaofeng; Bea Hayden
- Country of origin: China
- Original language: Mandarin
- No. of seasons: 2
- No. of episodes: 32 (Season 1); 34 (Season 2)

Production
- Executive producer: Yu Yi
- Producers: Tang Panjing; Feng Shaofeng
- Production locations: Taiwan, Shanghai, New York City (Season 1); Hengdian, Taiwan, Fujian (Season 2)
- Running time: 45 minutes
- Production companies: Dream Stardom Film and TV Culture Co., Ltd

Original release
- Network: Hunan TV
- Release: 6 February – 31 October 2017

The Starry Night, The Starry Sea (Chinese: 那片星空那片海; pinyin: Nà piàn xīngkōng nà piàn Hǎi) is a 2017 Chinese television series starring Feng Shaofeng and Bea Hayden. It is adapted from the novel of the same name by Tong Hua. The series aired on Hunan TV from 6 February to 8 March 2017.

A second season set in the Tang dynasty, titled The Starry Night, The Starry Sea 2 (Chinese: 那片星空那片海2), aired on Hunan TV from 2 October to 31 October 2017.

== Synopsis ==
=== Season one ===
Shen Luo is an ordinary girl who moves from the busy city life to a small cottage in the island. She meets Wu Julan, a man with a mysterious background. Julan is actually a merman, a mystical creature only spoke of in legends. Using his special powers and astute intelligence, he helps Shen Luo overcome many obstacles and they eventually fall in love; however, trouble arises when the spiritual pearl which Wu Julan had lost a hundred over years ago is found to be inside Shen Luo's body, and removing it would cause her death.

=== Season two ===
Set in the Tang dynasty, the story follows a human girl, Lu Li, who disguises herself as a male to work in a shipyard and realize her dreams. There, she meets merman Wu Julan, who has arrived with a hidden motive. The two grow to know and love each other, but conspiracies surface and Lu Li is torn between kinship and love.

== Cast ==
=== Season one ===
- Feng Shaofeng as Wu Julan (Prince of the Merman tribe)
- Bea Hayden as Shen Luo (Descendant of Du Xiaolin, the person who stole Wu Julan's spiritual pearl)
- Huang Ming as Jiang Yisheng (Shen Luo's best friend. He has hereditary mental illness. He falls in love with Wu LiangLiang)
- Sunny Wang as An Zuo (A black wizard who tries to manipulate Zhou Buwen due to his greed for money. He also tries to make use of Wu Julan to revive his father)
- Wang Mengli as Wu LiangLiang (Guardian of the Merman tribe. She is extremely loyal toward Wu Julan)
- Wang Yanlin as Zhu Yiyang (A cowardly gangster who silently protects his crush, Zhou Buyan)
- Sui Yongliang as Zhou Buwen (Childhood friend of Shen Luo and Jiang Yisheng; has a one-sided crush for Shen Luo)
- Guo Xiaoting as Zhou Buyan (A rich heiress who falls in love with her older cousin, Zhou Buwen)
- Wang Xinwei as Mi Xue'er (A rebellious and forward-thinking city girl who falls in love with Wu Julan)
- Yang Mingna as Su Jiafang (Shen Luo's step mother)

=== Season two ===
- Feng Shaofeng as Wu Julan (Prince of the Merman tribe)
- Bea Hayden as Lu Li (Ancestor of Shen Luo, Love interest of Wu Julan during the Tang dynasty)
- Bosco Wong as Mo Hen (Past incarnation of Jiang Yisheng. He is also a merman and the cousin of Wu Julan who has turned to the dark side due to wanting the throne of the merman kingdom that was taken by his uncle, Wu Julan's father)
- Sunny Wang as Lu Xiao (Past incarnation of An Zuo. Lu Li's brother, Governor in charge of the seaport and shipyard business, secretly plotting against the merman clan with Mo Hen due to his family tragedy at sea during his childhood)
- Liu Mengmeng as Yin Hu ( Past incarnation of Wu LiangLiang. A mermaid who has a touching Loveline with Ma Dachun, the apprentice of the merman priestess)
- Liu Enyou as Qin Hao (Past incarnation of Zhu Yiyang) (Childhood friend of Lu Li and Lu Xiao, and son of Lu Xiao's supervisor. He has a one-sided love for Lu Li)
- Li Chuan as Ma Dachun (Past incarnation of Zhou Buwen, A poor scholar in charge of tutoring Lu Li)
- Sun Jiaqi as Zi Xuan (Past incarnation of Zhou Buyan)
- Ye Qing as Ming Zhu (Past incarnation of Mi Xue'er. She is a gentle blind lady who works at the teahouse, and becomes romantically entangled with Mo Hen)
- Yang Mingna as Madame Qin (Past incarnation of Su Jiafang, Qin Hao's mother)

== Soundtrack ==
=== Season one ===
Soundtrack album
No.	Title	Lyrics	Singer	Length
1.	"The Starry Night, The Starry Sea (那片星空那片海)" (Opening theme song)	Yi Yue	Jin Zhiwen
2.	"Echo (回声)" (Ending theme song)		Zhou Shen
3.	"Starry Sea in the Summer Sky (夏夜星空海)"		Jeff Chang
4.	"When Love Comes (当爱降临)"		Wang Yaoguang
5.	"Don't Say (别说)"		Zhong Chunguang

=== Season two ===
Soundtrack album
No.	Title	Writer(s)	Singer	Length
1.	"The Starry Night and Sea is You (星辰大海是你)" (Opening theme song)		Vision Wei
2.	"The Wide Blue Sea of the Past (曾经沧海)" (Ending theme song)	Tian Jinghua, Yin Zhenxiao	Zhou Shen
3.	"If the Sea Does Not Exist in the World (如果世界没有海)"	Tian Jinghua, Yin Zhenxiao	Jin Wenqi

== Ratings ==
=== Season one ===
Episode #	Original broadcast date	Average audience share (CSM52)			Average audience share (National Average)		
Episode #	Original broadcast date	Ratings	Audience share	Ranking	Ratings	Audience share	Ranking
1-2	February 6, 2017	1.013	5.436	3	1.27	7.96	3
3-4	February 7, 2017	0.936	5.045	5	1.15	7.31	3
5-6	February 8, 2017	0.936	5.045	5	1.26	7.88	8
7-8	February 13, 2017	0.484	2.853	19	0.73	5.26	7
9-10	February 14, 2017	0.661	4.152	8	0.66	5.05	7
11-12	February 15, 2017	0.826	3.05	6	0.73	5.47	7
13-14	February 20, 2017	0.723	4.537	9	0.68	5.36	6
15-16	February 21, 2017	0.702	4.301	8	0.51	3.97	8
17-18	February 22, 2017	0.725	4.594	6	0.63	4.82	7
19-20	February 27, 2017	0.527	3.75	11	0.54	4.43	8
21-22	February 28, 2017	0.591	3.826	12	0.45	3.8	9
23-24	March 1, 2017	0.758	4.969	8	0.51	4.33	10
25-26	March 6, 2017	0.735	4.998	6	0.57	4.99	5
27-28	March 7, 2017	0.882	5.733	3	0.79	6.73	3
29-32	March 8, 2017	0.735	5.145	7	0.74	6.71	3
Average		0.756	4.65	–	0.748	5.60	–

- Highest ratings are marked in red, lowest ratings are marked in blue
