= Jiang Chao =

Chinese actor and singer

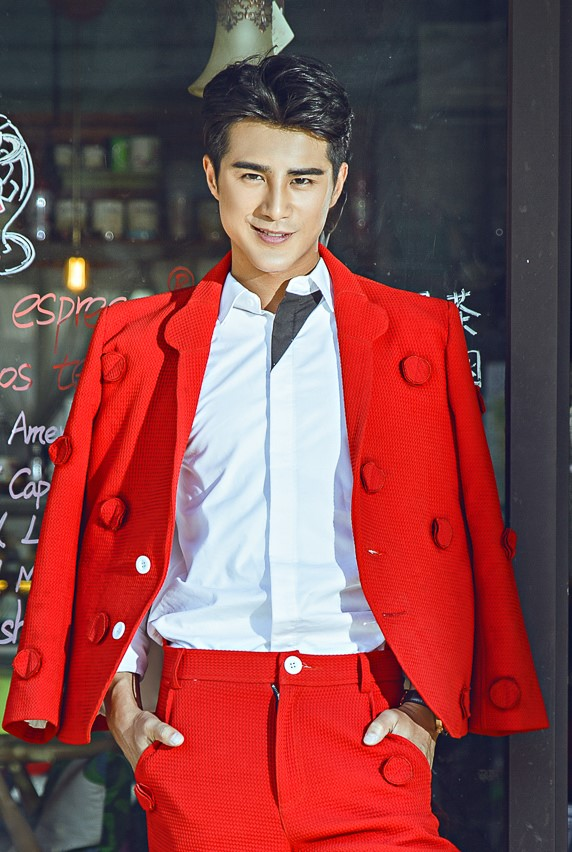
- Jiang in 2015
- Born: 12 August 1991 (age 35); Liuan, Anhui, China
- Other name: Jo Jiang
- Education: Beijing Contemporary Music Academy
- Occupations: Actor; singer
- Years active: 2011–present
- Agent: EE-Media
- Spouse: Madina Memet
- Children: 2

Chinese name
- Chinese: 姜潮
Transcriptions
Standard Mandarin
- Hanyu Pinyin: Jiāng Cháo

Jiang Chao (Chinese: 姜潮, born 12 August 1991), also known as Jo Jiang, is a Chinese actor and singer. He graduated in Beijing Contemporary Music Academy, and was the Jinan region's champion in the singing contest Super Boy (2010). He is noted for his role as Xi Cheng in the Tiny Times film series and as Gu Cheng Ze in the romantic comedy series The Fox's Summer.

== Filmography ==
=== Film ===
Year	English title	Chinese title	Role	Notes/Ref.
2011		安全感	Liu Chen	Short film
2012	Youth Hormones	青春荷尔蒙	Jiang Chao	
2013	Forever Love	201314	Zhou Mo	
2013	One Night in Chengdu	成都一夜	Jiang Chao	
2013	Tiny Times	小时代	Xi Cheng	
2013	Tiny Times 2	小时代2：青木时代	Xi Cheng	
2014	Forever Love	201413	Luo Ke	
2014	Tiny Times 3	小时代3：刺金时代	Xi Cheng	
2014	The Girl	校花驾到	Yu Haoran	Web film
2014	Haunted Road	怨灵	Hua Zi	
2015	Unforgettable Blast	迷与狂	Ye Xiao	
2015	Tiny Times 4	小时代4：灵魂尽头	Xi Cheng	
2015	Only You	非你勿扰	Gu Ming	
2015	Close Ladies	闺蜜心窍	Li Tianlin	
2016	Money and Love	恭喜發財之談錢說愛	Luo Ben Shao Ye	Cameo
2016		暴走兄弟VS殭屍古惑仔	Xiao Jun	Web film
2016	Love Studio	同城邂逅	Yun Fan	
2016	So I Married an Anti-fan	所以......和黑粉结婚了	Gao Xiang	
2016	For Love to Let Go	为爱放手	Tan Yao	
2016	Cupid Arrow	爱神箭	Fang Qihua	Cameo
2016	Blood Paint	杀人魔画	Zhou Haipeng	Web film
2017	Young Pea	青春逗	Lin Hanjie	
2017	Love Forever	我們遇見松花湖	Chen Jinlin	
2018	Surrender to Innocent Girls	向天真的女生投降	Po Tou	
2019	Desire Game	欲念游戏	Fei Fan	
2021	Passage of My Youth	岁月忽已暮	Gu Xinlie	
2021	Fairy Dance			
TBA	Wonderful Friends		Ken / Jiang Chao	

=== Television series ===
Year	English title	Chinese title	Role	Notes/Ref.
2011	Hello Summer	夏日甜心	Jiang Chao	
2012		冲吧宅男	Jiang Chao	
2013	Runaway Sweetheart	落跑甜心	Na Te	
2013	Wonder Lady 2	極品女士第二季	Cameo	
2014	The Legend of Bubai Monk	布袋和尚新傳	Da Peng	
2014	The Legend of Bubai Monk	四大萌捕	Fortune Teller	
2015	Seven Friends	七个朋友	Ah Hu	
2015		九星天辰诀	Ye Chen	
2016	Ice Fantasy	幻城	Xin Jue	
2016	Suddenly Seventeen	28岁未成年	Mao Liang	
2017	The Fox's Summer	狐狸的夏天	Gu Chengze	
2017	Legend of Kaifeng	开封府传奇	Song Renzong	
2018	To Love To Heal	我站在桥上看风景	Zhang Zhenglan	
2019	Hero Dog 3	神犬小七第三季	Bian Mu	
2019	My Robot Boyfriend	我的机器人男友	Mo Bai	
2020	The Heiress	女世子	Chen Yanyi	
TBA	Young Shield	少年盾	Lu Hao	
TBA	Once Loved You, Distressed Forever		Kuang Ming	

== Discography ==
Year	English title	Chinese title	Album
2010	"Let Us Love"	讓我們相愛	My Stage
2012	"Happiness in a Hundred Miles"	幸福百米	Runaway Sweetheart OST
2012	"Youth Rain Clears Up"	青春雨放晴	Youth Hormones OST
2013	"Get Lost"	迷路	—N/a
2020	"Don't Wait"	别等	The Heiress OST

== Awards and nominations ==
Year	Award	Category	Nominated work	Result	Ref.
2017	2nd Asia New Media Film Festival	Most Popular Actor (Web series)	The Fox's Summer	Won	
