= This Thriving Land =

2025 Chinese television series

- Promotional poster
- Also known as: All Things Born
- Chinese: 生万物
- Genre: Historical
- Based on: Qian Quan Yu Jue Jue by Zhao Defa
- Written by: Wang He
- Directed by: Liu Jiacheng
- Starring: Yang Mi, Ou Hao
- Country of origin: China
- Original language: Mandarin
- No. of episodes: 36

Production
- Producer: Xu Mi
- Running time: 45 minutes
- Production companies: China Central Television and iQIYI

Original release
- Network: CCTV-8 & iQIYI
- Release: 13 August – 24 August 2025

This Thriving Land (Chinese: 生万物; pinyin: shēng wàn wù) is a 2025 Chinese television series written by Wang He, directed by Liu Jiacheng and starring Yang Mi and Ou Hao. It is adapted from the novel Qian Quan Yu Jue Jue by Zhao Defa. Produced by China Central Television and iQiyi, the series premiered on 13 August 2025 in the prime time slot on CCTV-8 and was simultaneously streamed exclusively online on iQiyi.

This Thriving Land reversed the declining viewership trend for long-form Chinese television drama, with a single-day effective playback of over 100 million and a market share exceeding 46.1%. It revived public interest in the Chinese medicinal herb danshen, Qi-Lu culture and the Shandong dialect, while also driving a surge in iQIYI's stock price and a tourism boom for its filming locations in Shandong.

== Synopsis ==
Ning Xiuxiu (Yang Mi), the daughter of the wealthiest man in Tianniu Temple Village, was abducted by bandits on her wedding day. Her father Ning Xuexiang (Ni Dahong), unwilling to part with his farmland to pay the ransom, instead arranged for her younger sister Ning Susu (Xing Fei) to take her place and marry Xiuxiu's childhood sweetheart, Fei Wendian (Zhang Tianyang). After escaping and returning home, Xiuxiu was enraged by her father's decision and cut ties with him. She then married Feng Dajiao (Ou Hao), the farmer who had rescued her from the bandits' lair. Learning to work the land, she gradually came to understand the profound significance of the soil to peasants. Later, inspired by the revolutionary ideas of Du Chunlin and others, she actively guided the village women to break free from feudal constraints and organized fellow villagers to combat bandits, resist Japanese invaders, and support the military. Through countless trials, Xiuxiu ultimately reconciled with her father and discovered her own purpose in life.

== Cast ==
- Yang Mi as Ning Xiuxiu
- Ou Hao as Feng Dajiao
- Ni Dahong as Ning Xuexiang
- Qin Hailu as Madam Fei Zuo
- Xing Fei as Ning Susu
- Zhang Tianyang as Fei Wendian
- Zhang Haiyu as Guo Guiyao
- Chi Peng as Mrs. Feng
- Lin Yongjian as Feng Er
- Sun Shaolong as Tie Tou
- Lan Yingying as Yin Zi

== Production ==
=== Development ===
The series is adapted from the novel Qian Quan Yu Jue Jue by Zhao Defa, an author from Rizhao, China. The original work won the 3rd People's Literature Award, the 4th Shandong Provincial Excellence Project Award, was shortlisted for the 5th Mao Dun Literature Prize, and was selected as a key project in the National Radio and Television Administration's Outstanding Literary Works Adaptation Initiative. The series depicts the evolving fortunes and intertwined destinies of three families—the Nings, the Fengs, and the Feis, represented by Ning Xiuxiu, Feng Dajiao, and Fei Zuoshi—across two generations on the land of southern Shandong from 1926 to 1986. The villagers of Tianniu Temple have a long history of sustained agricultural cultivation.

It was selected as a key project of the "Qilu Literary and Artistic Peak Plan" and included in the 2025 "Great Dramas on CCTV" television series lineup by China Media Group.

=== Filming ===
Filming locations for the series included Yinan County in Linyi, Donggang District and Renjiatai Village in Rizhao, as well as Feijiazhuang Village. The series released its concept poster and announced the cast on 23 April 2024, and wrapped filming on 5 August of the same year.

== Reception ==
On Yang Mi's portrayal of the character Ning Xiuxiu, Zhao Defa, the author of the novel that the series is based on, wrote: "She brought Xiuxiu to life. Her nuanced depiction of Xiuxiu's shock and loneliness after misfortune, her bewilderment and hatred toward her father, lingering feelings for Fei Wendian, gradual acceptance and growing affection for Dajiao, as well as her learning and integration into farm life—all were portrayed with meticulous detail."

=== Critical response ===
Critic Di Hanwei from People's Daily noted that This Thriving Land strictly adheres to "the narrative center of land ethics, from which all major conflicts and plotlines unfold, depicting a temporal landscape where agrarian civilization and modernity clash and intertwine." He described the series as a passionate call for a return to the spiritual homeland of modern people: "The characters' profound connection to the land, their life and death, love and pain on it, evoke a primal memory deep in the genes of contemporary people—a longing for 'roots'." Regarding the characters, he views Ning Xiuxiu as "both inheriting the resilience and maternal nature of Chinese rural women and radiating the light of spiritual awakening that transcends the limitations of her time—an individual who actively fights against the storms of fate and seeks self-realization within the framework of land ethics." Meanwhile, Feng Dajiao embodies "responsibility, duty, and optimism." Their relationship is described as "a quiet yet deeply powerful, warm current in the midst of impoverished lives and turbulent times, one that can still melt viewers' hearts today."

CCTV commentator Lu Jianing described This Thriving Land as an 'epic of ordinary people, brimming with earthy charm,' praising its non-stereotypical characterizations: "The series features various round characters—moral standing isn't determined by class, and diverse personalities are restored from class representations to vivid individuals, with personal dispositions shaping their destinies. The creators portray these characters with empathy, acknowledging historical limitations rather than easily judging their choices from a contemporary perspective." Critic Dai Qing from Wenyi Bao described This Thriving Land as "an epic of the people, ceaseless and enduring," one that profoundly portrays farmers' "deep-seated connection to the land—a bond etched into their very bones." Regarding its adaptation, she believes the series "toned down the original work's depictions of class struggle and violence," thereby transforming the novel's "raw and gritty style into something warm and bright." About the characters, she finds Ning Xiuxiu "particularly outstanding for her credible and relatable spiritual growth," and she identifies the love-after-marriage story between Ning Xiuxiu and Feng Dajiao as "the most important plotline and emotional thread of the entire series." On a cultural level, Dai Qing notes that the series "retains a wealth of folk elements from the original novel, such as the Xuegucang (踅谷仓) (Note: a traditional farming ritual where villagers draw concentric circles with grass ash on Longtaitou Festival, chanting "the large granary full, the small granary overflowing" to pray for abundant harvest and overflowing grain storage.) folk songs, the legend of the iron ox, and farmers' agricultural economics, which further highlights the rustic charm and Qi–Lu culture, making the era and regional qualities of the work more distinct and vivid."

=== Viewership ===
Following its premiere on CCTV-8 on 13 August 2025, the series achieved both high broadcast ratings and online streaming numbers, reversing the declining viewership trend for long-form dramas. According to the CVB 2025 domestic TV drama viewership report released by the National Radio and Television Administration, its premiere on CCTV-8 earned a rating of 2.388%, reaching 880 million viewers, and its subsequent re-airing on Dragon Television attracted 130 million viewers, ranking as the third most-watched re-aired drama on China's provincial satellite channels in 2025. On Weibo, related topics garnered 2.07 billion reads. The series ranked first on iQiyi's 2025 TV drama popularity chart. This Thriving Land also topped the charts on multiple data platforms, with its viewership market share exceeded 46.1%, setting a new industry record for 2025. Its single-day effective playback exceeded 100 million, topping the daily playback chart of any series in the recent three years. On iQiyi, the series' popularity index broke 10,000 on 16 August 2025, within 65 hours of release, and reached 10,761 on 19 August 2025, becoming the second-highest in the platform's history.

=== Impact ===
Due to the popularity of This Thriving Land, iQiyi's stock price rose. As of the closing bell on 20 August 2025, it had increased by 17.09%. The series has also fueled a surge in tourism to its filming locations in Shandong, with Ning Manor—the home of the character Ning Xiuxiu—now experiencing a visitor boom, as crowds swarm to take photographs at the site. According to Jingshi Live, the number of visitors has doubled compared to the same period in 2024. Key filming sites, such as Ning Manor, Fei Manor, Feng Manor, the "One-horned Bull", and the rolled Jianbing—central to both the scenes and the cuisine in the series—have been restored. Additionally, multiple plot-themed photo spots and professional guided tours have been added to provide visitors with an immersive experience.

The series has also popularized the Shandong dialect beyond its regional boundaries. Expressions from the drama such as "俺知不道" (Ǎn zhī bù dào, 'I Know Not)' and "俺也是" (Ǎn yěshì, 'me too') sparked a wave of online imitation, giving rise to several internet memes. Audience engagement included learning phrases such as "扎觅食汉" (Zhā mì shí hàn, a hired farmhand or labourer), "拉呱" (Lā guǎ, chat), and "夜来" (Yèlái, yesterday), and blending the first-person pronoun of the dialect, 俺, with the MBTI concepts of "i人" (introvert person) and "e-人" (extrovert person) to form the new term "俺人" (I-person, used as I in pronoun). This has exposed the Qi–Lu culture to a broader audience.

The series also revived the public interest in danshen, a Chinese medicinal herb long praised with the saying "a single herb has effects equivalent to Siwu Tang Wan". The drama's plot, in which the protagonist Ning Xiuxiu grows this herb and leads her fellow villagers to increase their income and combat disasters, brought it back into the public spotlight, generating widespread attention.

== Original soundtrack ==
No.	Title	Lyrics	Music	Singer	Length
1.	"One Grain, One Year (一穗沉土，一歲沉浮)" (Theme song)	Hua Xiyue	Yuan Wenrui	Lei Jia	4:18
2.	"To My Beloved (給愛人)"	Li Xuqing	Yuan Wenrui	Huang Xiaoyun	3:57
3.	"A Lifetime (一生)"	Wang Yiqing	Sun Aili	Hong Yinuo	4:26
