= Tiny Times =

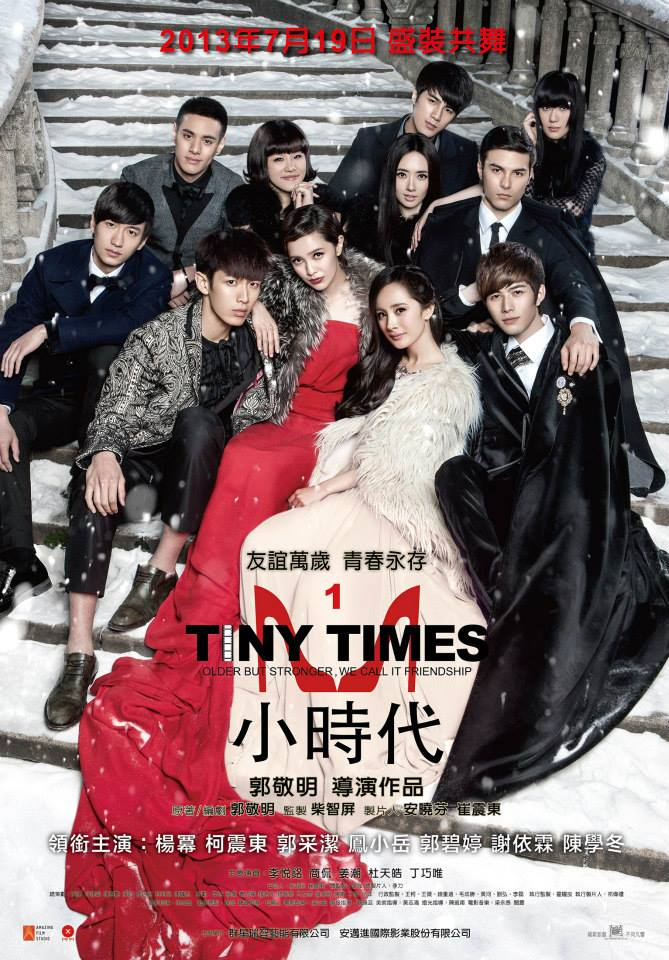
- Film poster
- Directed by: Guo Jingming
- Written by: Guo Jingming
- Screenplay by: Guo Jingming
- Based on: Tiny Times 1.0 by Guo Jingming
- Produced by: Li Li; An Xiaofen; Adam Tsuei; Zhou Qiang; Angie Chai
- Starring: Yang Mi; Kai Ko; Amber Kuo; Rhydian Vaughan; Bea Hayden; Evonne Hsieh; Cheney Chen; Li Yueming; Jiang Chao
- Cinematography: Randy Che
- Edited by: Gu Xiaoyun
- Music by: Hou Zhijian
- Production companies: He Li Chen Guang Media; EE-Media; Star Ritz Prods. H&R Century Pictures; Beijing Forbidden City Film; Le Vision Pictures (Tianjin); Le Vision Pictures; Shenzhen Desen Intl. Media; Amazing Film Studio; Comic Ritz Film & TV Culture; Mission Media Investment
- Distributed by: China Film Group Cooperation (China); Dasheng International Media (China); Le Vision Pictures Co. (China)
- Release date: June 27, 2013
- Running time: 115 minutes
- Country: China
- Language: Mandarin
- Budget: ¥45 million (estimated)
- Box office: ¥484 million (US$79.7 million)

Tiny Times (Chinese: 小时代), also known as Tiny Times 1.0 is a 2013 film and the first installment of the film series written and directed by Guo Jingming. The movie is based on Guo's best-selling novel of the same name.

== Plot ==
The story follows four young women who are high school classmates and later become college roommates. On campus, they start their internships and experience a series of romantic affairs. After graduation, they continue their correspondence, suffused with misunderstanding and jealousy. However, they have all changed significantly.

After graduation, Lin Xiao settles into her job as an editorial assistant at a fashion magazine and acclimating herself to the glamorous, high-octane world of haute couture. She meets her demanding and cold boss, Gong Ming, whose melancholic persona is described by Lin Xiao as "a distant, lonely planet in the universe". Her work puts her relationship with her high school sweet heart, Jian Xi in peril.

Meanwhile, Gu Li faces struggle in her relationship with Gu Yuan at the intervention of his mother, who seeks to marry him off to an even wealthier family. Nan Xiang paints to support her fashion design studies, while at the same time struggle with her on-and-off relationship with abusive boyfriend Xi Cheng. Wan Ru worries that her aspirations in life are never really made certain, and the fact that she might not get a boyfriend.

== Cast ==
- Yang Mi as Lin Xiao
- Kai Ko as Gu Yuan
- Amber Kuo as Gu Li
- Rhydian Vaughan as Gong Ming
- Bea Hayden as Nan Xiang
- Evonne Hsieh as Tang Wanru
- Cheney Chen as Zhou Chongguang
- Li Yueming as Jian Xi
- Jiang Chao as Xi Cheng
- Kitty Shang as Kitty
- Calvin Tu as Wei Hai
- Wang Lin as Ye Chuanping
- Ding Qiaowei as Yuan Yi

== Release and reception ==
=== Box office ===
The film grossed US$79.7 million at the Chinese box office.

=== Accolades ===
List of awards and nominations
Award	Category	Nominee	Result
China Movie Channel Media Awards	Best Feature		Won (tied)
China Movie Channel Media Awards	Best New Director	Guo Jingming	Won
9th Chinese American Film Festival	Golden Angel Award: Best Feature		Won

== Original soundtrack ==
Song Category	Song Name	Singer	Notes
Theme song	我好想你	Sodagreen	
Ending theme song	回聲樂團	Echo	
Soundtrack	時間煮雨	Yisa Yu	
Soundtrack	殘忍的纏綿	Liu Xin	
Soundtrack	萬物無邪	Cheney Chen	
Soundtrack	不再見	Cheney Chen	
Soundtrack	歲月縫花	Cheney Chen	
Soundtrack	雨	Fu Mengni	
Soundtrack	熱雪	Vision Wei	
Soundtrack	Are you with me	Gao Kaiwei	
Soundtrack	你讓星星發亮	Gao Kaiwei	
Soundtrack	不管發生什麼別放開我的手	Gao Kaiwei	
Soundtrack	停停停	Gao Kaiwei	
Soundtrack	Go	Julia Wu	
Soundtrack	Love Come Undone	Julia Wu	
Soundtrack	Auld Lang Syne	Julia Wu	
Soundtrack	Whatever	Julia Wu	
Soundtrack	Roller Coaster	Terence	
Soundtrack	Everything	Terence	
Soundtrack	Everybody Feel Like Dancing	Terence	
Soundtrack	微光	Sodagreen	
