= Tiny Times 4 =

- Chinese film poster
- Directed by: Guo Jingming
- Written by: Guo Jingming
- Produced by: Qi Weili; Guo Jingming
- Starring: Yang Mi; Amber Kuo; Cheney Chen; Bea Hayden; Evonne Hsieh
- Cinematography: Randy Che
- Edited by: Qiao Aiyu
- Music by: Nathan Wang
- Production companies: Helichenguang International Culture Media (Beijing); Le Vision Pictures; Shanghai Maisong Film Investment
- Release date: July 9, 2015
- Running time: 116 minutes
- Country: China
- Language: Mandarin
- Box office: US$77.8 million

Tiny Times 4 (Chinese: 小时代4：灵魂尽头) is a 2015 Chinese romantic drama film and the fourth installment of the Tiny Times franchise directed and written by Guo Jingming. Originally scheduled for release in February 2015; it was delayed to July 2015.

Kai Ko's scenes were edited out from the film due to his drug use in September 2014.

== Plot ==
Gu Li finds herself at a loss due to the heavy amount of debts let behind by her father. At the same time, she finds herself struck with cancer. Too proud to admit her struggle to anyone, Gu Li sets off a chain of self-destructive events, leading her to become estranged from her best friends and ultimately her boyfriend, Gu Yuan.

Meanwhile, Lin Xiao becomes engaged with the mysterious Lu Shao. Unhappy with this, Gong Xun orders her to be sacked, which in turn causes a scuffle between him and a protesting Lu Shao. Gong Xun falls into a coma, and the traumatized Lu Shao dumps Lin Xiao.

Nan Xiang, who gets a job at M.E Magazine thanks to Lin Xiao's connections, quickly reveal her true colors as she climbs the corporate ladder thanks to her new-found relationship with Lin Xiao's boss, Gong Ming.

Wan Ru, who has been disfigured due to a fight between her friends, distanced herself from the group as she struggles to heal from both the physical and emotional scar.

== Cast ==
- Yang Mi
- Amber Kuo
- Cheney Chen
- Bea Hayden
- Evonne Hsieh
- Lee Hyun-jae
- Vivian Dawson
- Ming Ren
- Jiang Chao
- Wang Lin
- Kiwi Shang
- Anatoly Shanin
- Kai Ko (scenes edited)

== Reception ==
=== Box office ===
The film made an estimated US$36 million in its opening weekend in China, coming in second place at the Chinese box office behind Forever Young and fourth internationally behind Minions, Terminator Genisys and Forever Young.

=== Critical reception ===
Derek Elley of Film Business Asia gave the film a 7 out of 10, calling it "a satisfying conclusion to the BFF/fashionista saga that's even, surprisingly, touching."

== Box office ==
The film grossed RMB111 million (US$17.8 million) on the opening day including midnight release of RMB6.85 million (US$1.10 million) with total gross US$77.8 million.

== Original soundtrack ==
Song Category	Song Name	Singer	Notes
Theme song	灵魂尽头	A-mei	
Ending theme song	岁月缝花	Cheney Chen	
Soundtrack	时间煮雨	Kris Wu, Yisa Yu	Two versions.
Soundtrack	不再见	Cheney Chen	
Soundtrack	友谊地久天长	TINGTING, Li Ruoxi	
Soundtrack	Where Did Our Love Go	Huang Jin	
Soundtrack	Heartache	Huang Jin	
Soundtrack	TT4	Huang Jin	
Soundtrack	For You I Stay	Christina O'connor	
Soundtrack	Baby Girl	Justine Haxley	
Soundtrack	Find My Way Back Home	Justine Haxley	
Soundtrack	As I Dream Alone in Twilight	Zhang Jueping	
Soundtrack	爱不离	Li Ruoxi	
Soundtrack	I'll Carry On	Li Ruoxi	
Soundtrack	有你会天晴	Li Ruoxi	
