= Julia Wu (singer) =

Taiwanese R&B singer

Julia Wu 吳卓源
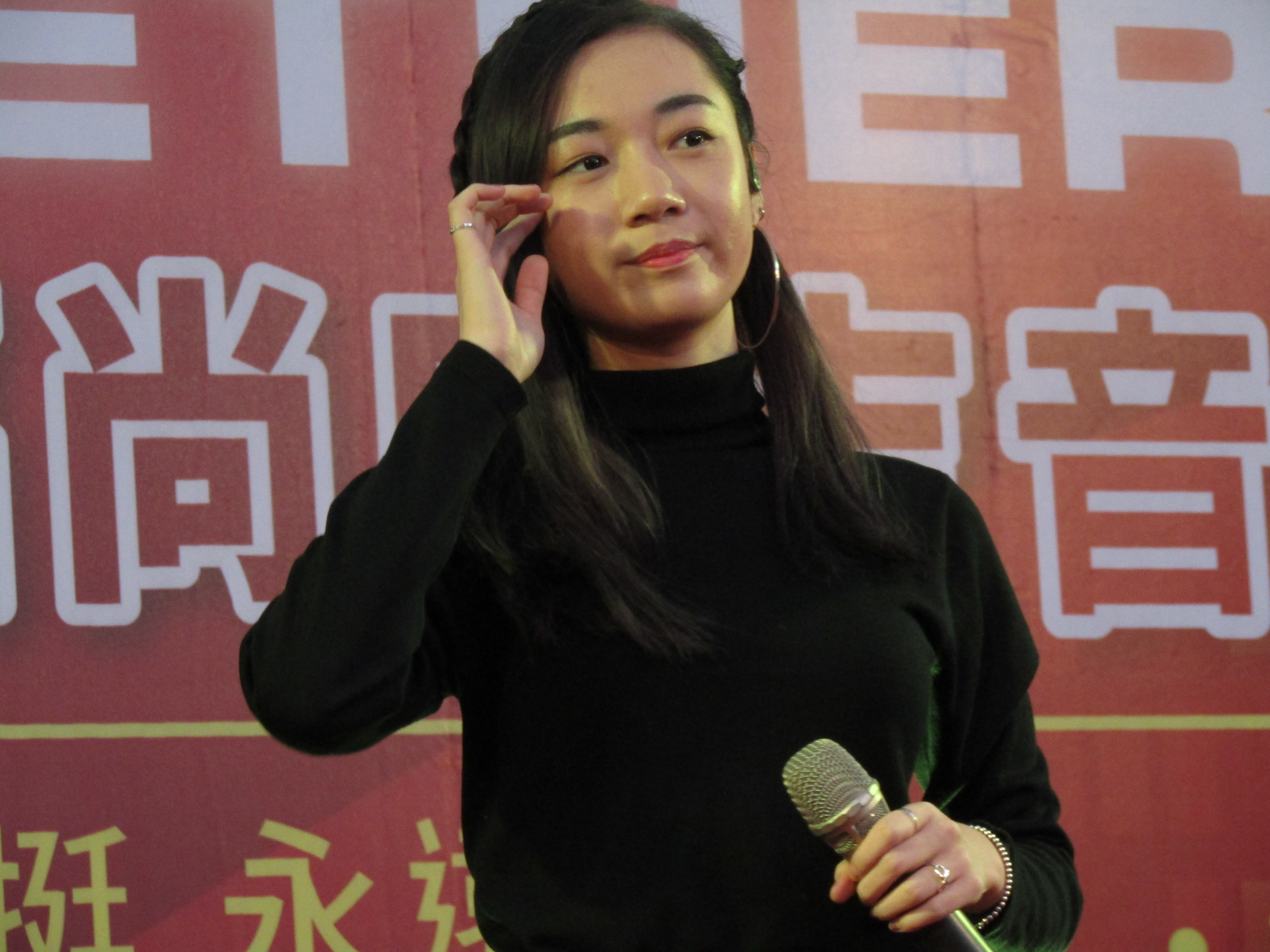
- Wu in 2017

Background information
- Born: 6 October 1994 (age 32); Hainan, China
- Origin: Brisbane, Australia
- Genre: R&B
- Occupation: Singer
- Instrument: Voice
- Years active: 2017–present
- Label: Chynahouse

Chinese name
- Traditional Chinese: 吳卓源
Transcriptions
Standard Mandarin
- Hanyu Pinyin: Wú Zhuōyuán
Southern Min
- Hokkien POJ: Ngô̍ Toh-goân

Julia Wu (born 6 October 1994) is a Chinese Australian R&B singer based in Taiwan.

== Early life and education ==
Wu grew up in Brisbane, Australia. She graduated from the Berklee College of Music in 2015, majoring in piano.

== Musical career ==
Wu began classical piano training at an early age. In 2014, she garnered recognition for her performance in the sixth season of The X Factor. She starred in the CJ E&M variety show "Miss Korea: Julia & Jojo" alongside Jojo Hung in 2015. In 2017, Wu debuted with the English language EP @henry, and released her debut Mandarin single "Under the Stars."

== Discography ==
- @henry (2017)
- 1:28 (2017)
- 1994 依舊舊事 (2018)
- 5 am (2019)
- 5 pm (2020)
- 5:30 (2020)
- 5:30 Rehearsals (2020)
- 2622 (2021)
- IDFK (2022)
