= Tiny Times 3 =

- Theatrical poster
- Directed by: Guo Jingming
- Written by: Guo Jingming
- Based on: Tiny Times 3.0 by Guo Jingming
- Produced by: Qi Weili; Guo Jingming
- Starring: Yang Mi; Kai Ko; Amber Kuo; Cheney Chen; Bea Hayden; Evonne Hsieh
- Cinematography: Randy Che
- Edited by: Qiao Aiyu
- Music by: Alan Wong; Janet Yung
- Production companies: EE-Media; Beijing Forbidden City Film; Shanghai Maisong Film Investment; Le Vision Pictures (Tianjin) Co.; Helichenguang International Culture Media (Beijing)
- Release date: July 17, 2014
- Running time: 126 minutes
- Country: China
- Language: Mandarin
- Box office: US$86,900,000

Tiny Times 3 (Chinese: 小时代：刺金时代) is a 2014 Chinese romantic drama film and the third installment of the Tiny Times franchise directed and written by Guo Jingming. Filming started in Rome on December 10, 2013. The film released on July 17, 2014.

== Plot ==
Gu Li heads to Rome to attend a fashion show. At the insistence of Gong Ming, Lin Xiao follows suit, along with Nan Xiang and Tang Wan Ru. A mad chase thus follows, with the girls touring Rome and meeting all sorts of adventures along the way.

When in Rome, Gu Li runs into her cousin Neil, an Ivy League law student. Suddenly, Lin Xiao receives a call from China, informing her that her cancer-stricken boyfriend, Zhou Chong Guang has died. She flies home for the funeral of her lover, where she sees a Chong Guang lookalike named Lu Shao appearing on the cover of M.E. magazine. This puzzles Lin Xiao who ponders about his true identity.

At the same time, Gu Li's half-brother Gu Zhun appears, claiming to own 20% of the shares of their father's company. As the company has been forcefully acquired by Gu Yuan's mother and Gong Ming, the siblings work together to take back their inheritance.

== Cast ==
- Yang Mi as Lin Xiao
- Kai Ko as Gu Yuan
- Amber Kuo as Gu Li
- Cheney Chen as Zhou Chongguang / Lu Shao (Shaun)
- Bea Hayden Kuo as Nan Xiang
- Evonne Hsieh as Tang Wanru
- Vivian Dawson as Gong Ming
- Lee Hyun-jae as Neil
- Ming Ren as Gu Zhun
- Jiang Chao as Xi Cheng
- Calvin Tu as Wei Hai
- Wang Lin as Ye Chuanping
- Shang Kan as Kitty

== Box office ==
The film grossed RMB111 million (US$17.8 million) on the opening day including midnight release of RMB6.85 million (US$1.10 million). In its third week, it was ranked 6th in the box office, having accumulated a total $82 million after its first 18 days. It earned a total of US$86.9 million.

== Original soundtrack ==
Category	Title	Performing artist
Theme song	"Kaleidoscope" (万花瞳)	Jolin Tsai
Ending theme song	"Time Boils the Rain" (时间煮雨)	Kris Wu
Soundtrack	"Gimmer of Light" (微光)	Sodagreen
Soundtrack	"No Goodbye" (不再见)	Chen Xuedong
Soundtrack	"Don't Forget" (别忘了)	Bibi Zhou
Soundtrack	"Hot Snow" (热雪)	Vision Wei
