= Guo Jingming =

Chinese young adult writer (born 1983)

- 郭敬明
- Born: June 6, 1983 (age 43); Zigong, Sichuan, China
- Education: Shanghai University (dropped out)
- Occupations: Writer, director
- Writing career
- Period: 1997-present
- Genre: Fantastic
- Notable work: Ice Fantasy

Guo Jingming (Chinese: 郭敬明; pinyin: Guō Jìngmíng; born June 6, 1983), also known as Edward Guo, is a Chinese young adult writer, director, and businessman.

While in high school, Guo began publishing articles online under the pen name Disiwei ("Fourth Dimension"), which earned him the nickname Xiao Si ("Little Four"). He rose to fame by winning first prize consecutively in the 2001 and 2002 New Concept Writing Competition. With the breakout success of Ice Fantasy (2003), he established himself as a commercially successful yet critically polarizing YA writer in China, followed by bestsellers such as Rush to the Dead Summer (2006), Cry Me a Sad River (2007), and the Tiny Times trilogy (2008–2012).

As a businessman, Guo founded Island Studio in 2004, publishing Island magazine until 2006. He founded CASTOR in 2006 and Zui Co., Ltd. in 2010. The two companies played a major role in China's young adult literature market until they merged in 2019. In 2008, Guo joined EE-Media as its Literary Director. Since the 2010s, he has shifted his career focus to being a filmmaker and showrunner, with works such as Tiny Times (2013–2015), L.O.R.D (2016–2020), The Yin-Yang Master (2020-2021), My Journey to You (2023) and Veil of Shadows (2026).

== Early life ==
Guo was born in Zigong, Sichuan province, located in the southwest of China. Guo's father, Cheng Jianwei, is an engineer who works in a state-owned enterprise; his mother, named Zou Huilan, works in a local bank as a clerk. Guo showed strong interest in reading during his early years. His mother bought many books to inspire him in reading, explaining everything until Guo was able to understand. Guo was able to memorize what he read or heard, such as stories that people read to him. Guo was able to recite them after listening to it only once. Guo's mother strongly supported his interest in reading, and let him pick any books he liked in the store.

Guo's writing talent emerged during his middle school years, as he avidly read Chinese literature and Wuxia fiction, particularly works by Jin Yong and Gu Long. This extensive reading taught and inspired him in his own writing, leading Guo to begin submitting to magazines. In 1997, he published his first poem, "Loneliness," in the national magazine Rensheng Shiliuqi. The contemporary poem expresses Guo's personal feelings of melancholy during his school years, for which he received 10 RMB (approximately 1.5 US dollars) as payment from the magazine.

== Career ==
Encouraged by his mother and motivated by the promise of guaranteed university admission for winners, Guo participated in the third and fourth New Concept Writing Competitions, a national writing contest sponsored by Mengya magazine. To win first place, he studied nearly all the winning entries from the previous two New Concept competitions, analyzing the judges' preferred style. He filled out seven application forms and submitted seven 5,000-word essays. He works, "Script" and "Our Last Song on Campus," eventually won the first prize for both of the contests in 2001 and 2002 respectively. However, by the time Guo participated in the competition, guaranteed university admission was no longer offered to winners. With his less-than-stellar gaokao scores, he missed his dream school Xiamen University, instead going to Shanghai University, where he majored in TV and film production until he dropped out. After publishing his first novel, On the Edge of Love and Pain (2002), Guo found great commercial success in his fantasy novel Ice Fantasy (2003), which he finished during the college summer break. Since then, he established himself as one of the best-selling writers in China.

Transporting from the small town of Zigong to Shanghai, Guo realized that "he was caught up by the abundance of the city". He decided to stay in Shanghai "with nothing and no one to help me except for the limited fame I gained through the writing contest". On Christmas Day in 2003, Guo gathered five of his close friends in the newest McDonald's in Shanghai, decided to establish a writing studio called "Island." Since then, Guo has launched his writing and business career, becoming one of China's most successful publishers and managers in the young adult literature market. In 2006, at 23, Guo became the youngest member of China Writers Association.

== Controversy ==
=== Plagiarism ===
In 2004, Guo published a novel Never Flowers in Never Dream while he studied at Shanghai University. The book portrayed a triangle love "featuring harmless forays into the Beijing underworld". Never Flowers in Never Dream has sold 600,000 copies in the first month after releasing. However, soon after, a court found that the book has "shared 12 major plot elements and 57 similarities with another author". The novel that Guo was accused to plagiarize is named "In and Out of the Circle" written by Zhuang Yu. In 2006, the court made the final judgment, which announced that Guo has violated Zhuang Yu's copyright, and ordered him to pay Zhuang Yu 200,000 RMB (approximate $25,000) as compensation and apologize to Zhuang. Guo has paid the damage fee; however, he refused to apologize or admit the plagiarism, or talk about this case.

Guo's success was shadowed by the controversy of plagiarism. After the affair of plagiarism, Guo has been called "Super Plagiarism Boy", "out-and-out thief", and "no sense of decency" by outraged people; however, it did not affect the support of his fans. Guo's next musical album and novel still sold very well, so that Guo responded that "I felt upset but soon realized that selling well was where strength lay". In 2007, he was voted on Tianya.com, one of the country's biggest online forums, as China's "most hated male celebrity" for the third year in a row. Guo, nevertheless, said people criticized him because they had never read his book, so he would not pay attention to their false judgments, though he hated to be misunderstood. Guo also announced that he would prove to people they were wrong even if it would take ten years to clarify.

On December 21, 2020, Guo and Yu Zheng were named in a joint letter signed by 111 Chinese film and television industry professionals. The letter called for an immediate end to the publicity and promotion of the two, citing their history of plagiarism and misconduct, and urged adjustments to the related variety shows they were currently participating in. On December 31, 2020, after more individuals joined signing the letter, Guo and Yu Zheng each issued apologies through their respective Weibo accounts. Guo also offered Zhuang Yu all the revenue he had received from Never Flowers in Never Dreams as a form of compensation.

=== Extravagance ===
Guo has courted controversy for his perceived extravagance and materialism, particularly through his publicly expressed taste for luxury goods and lavish properties, sensibilities that also inform his Tiny Times novel series, set against the cosmopolitan glamour of Shanghai. A widely circulated but inaccurate claim holds that Guo purchased a costly, historic Shanghai mansion that once belonged to Wang Jingwei's fourth concubine; while Guo does own a house in Jing'an District, Wang had only one wife. In a 2015 interview with China Newsweek, Guo characterized the criticism of his spending of lawfully earned income as "moral coercion," describing himself as a "catalyst" and "symbol" of the social tensions produced by the widening wealth gap.

=== Sexual harassment ===
In August 2017, Li Feng, a former signed writer under Guo's company, posted on Weibo accusing Guo of sexually harassing him in 2010. He further revealed that "Guo frequently sexually harasses and assaults male authors signed to his company, as well as male employees. To my knowledge, there are at least five cases, and there may be more that I'm unaware of." Guo denied the allegations.

== Notable works ==
=== Ice Fantasy ===
Guo's The Ice Fantasy (幻城) was initially serialized in the magazine Mengya and published as a book in 2003. It is a fantasy novel revolving around two princely brothers.

=== Tiny Times ===
A series of books containing 3 books entitled 1.0, 2.0, 3.0, following a group of young girls on their journey as they navigate between relationships, work and friendship in Shanghai.

=== Legend of Ravaging Dynasties ===
A series of books in memory of Guo's 10-year writing career.

=== Rush to the Dead Summer ===
A romance novel about several young people.

== Filmography ==
- Tiny Times (2013)
- Tiny Times 2 (2013)
- Tiny Times 3 (2014)
- Tiny Times 4 (2015)
- Ice Fantasy (2016)
- YES! MR FASHION (2016)
- L.O.R.D: Legend of Ravaging Dynasties (2016)
- Rush to the Dead Summer (2017)
- Cry Me a Sad River (2018)
- L.O.R.D: Legend of Ravaging Dynasties 2 (2020)
- The Yin-Yang Master: Dream of Eternity (2020)
