= Jiemi =

Jiemi may refer to:

- Decoded (novel) (解密; Jiěmì), 2002 Chinese novel by Mai Jia
  - Decoded (Chinese TV series), 2016 TV series based on the novel
  - Decoded (film), 2024 film based on the novel
- Disclosed (揭秘; Jiēmì), 2013 Singaporean TV series
