= List of Hong Kong films of 2003 =

This article lists feature-length Hong Kong films released in 2003.

== Box office ==
The highest-grossing Hong Kong films released in 2003 by domestic box office gross revenue, are as follows:

Highest-grossing films released in 2003
Rank	Title	Domestic gross
1	Infernal Affairs III	HK$30,225,661
2	The Twins Effect	HK$28,423,960
3	Running on Karma	HK$26,339,848
4	My Lucky Star	HK$24,961,198
5	Infernal Affairs II	HK$24,919,376
6	Love For All Seasons	HK$24,726,283
7	Love Undercover 2: Love Mission	HK$21,665,466
8	Good Times, Bed Times	HK$19,952,814
9	Dragon Loaded 2003	HK$16,322,916
10	Lost in Time	HK$15,494,587

== Releases ==
Title	Director	Cast	Genre	Notes
20:30:40	Sylvia Chang			
36th Chamber Of Southern Shaolin	Yuen Cheung			
Anna In Kung Fu-Land	Raymond Yip			
Aqua Heroes	Armed Reaction IV			
Be Out Control				
The Beast Of Tutor	Ma Sau Hing			
Belly of the Beast	Tony Ching	Steven Seagal		
Better Halves				
Black Cat Agent Files	Tin Jun			
Black Mask Vs Gambling Mastermind	Lee Bing Kwong			
Black Sash				
Colour of Sound	Joe Ma	Tony Leung, Miriam Yeung, Chen Chang	Romance	
Colours of the Truth	Wong Jing, Marco Mak	Anthony Wong, Lau Ching Wan, Jordan Chan, Francis Ng, Raymond Wong Ho-yin, Gillian Chung, Patrick Tse, Chapman To, Terence Yin	Action / Crime / Drama	
Dragon Loaded 2003	Vincent Kok	Eric Tsang, Ronald Cheng	Comedy	
Happy Go Lucky	Heaven Yiu	Kent Cheng, Gillian Chung, Wayne Lai	Comedy drama	Cinematographer: Herman Yau
Heroic Duo	Benny Chan	Leon Lai, Ekin Cheng, Francis Ng, Karena Lam, Xu Jinglei	Action / Crime / Thriller	
Infernal Affairs II	Andrew Lau, Alan Mak	Anthony Wong, Eric Tsang, Edison Chen, Shawn Yue, Carina Lau, Francis Ng, Hu Jun, Chapman To, Liu Kai Chi, Roy Cheung	Crime	
Infernal Affairs III	Andrew Lau, Alan Mak	Andy Lau, Tony Leung Chiu-Wai, Leon Lai, Chen Daoming, Kelly Chen, Anthony Wong, Eric Tsang, Chapman To, Ng Ting Yip	Crime	
Kidnap the Wrong Person	Aman Chang	Michael Tse, Michael Tao, Mark Cheng		
Laughter of "Water Margin" - Stolen Golden Ball		Angie Cheung, Loletta Lee, Wayne Lai, Wang Xi		
The Legend of Ghost Festival	Kenneth Lau	Wayne Lai		
Man in Blues	Yip Wai Ying	Wayne Lai, Nadia Chan		
The Medallion	Gordon Chan	Jackie Chan, Lee Evans, Claire Forlani, Anthony Wong, Nicholas Tse, Edison Chen	Action / Adventure / Fantasy	
The Park	Andrew Lau	Bobo Chan, Kara Hui, Tiffany Lee	Horror	
The Princess of Temple Street	Ching Fung	Michael Tse, Tiffany Lee, Belinda Hamnett, Law Kar-ying, Kingdom Yuen		
PTU	Johnnie To	Simon Yam, Maggie Siu, Lam Suet, Ruby Wong		
Running on Karma	Johnnie To, Wai Ka-Fai	Andy Lau, Cecilia Cheung, Cheung Siu-Fai		
Killer 2	Steve Cheng	Ronnie Cheung, Sam Chan, Lo Hoi Ying, Oscar Leung Lit Wai, Zoie Tam	Crime	
The Secret Society - Boss	Lam Wai Yin	Michael Tse, Jason Chu, Frankie Ng, Kara Hui, Raymond Cho		
Sexual Vengeance	Hong Lung	Joe Ma, Wayne Lai		
Shiver	Billy Chung	Francis Ng, Nick Cheung	Thriller	
Traces of a Dragon	Mabel Cheung	Jackie Chan, Charles and Lee-Lee Chan, Ti Lung	Documentary	
Troublesome Night 18	Jameson Lam	Law Lan, Simon Lui, Michael Tong, Yum Kong-Sau, Frankie Ng, Anita Chan, Tong Ka-Fai, Ronnie Cheung	Horror, comedy, romance	
Troublesome Night 19	Yip Wai-Ying	Law Lan, Simon Lui, Anita Chan, Ronnie Cheung, Tong Ka-Fai, Ken Wong	Horror, comedy, romance	
Truth or Dare: 6th Floor Rear Flat	Barbara Wong Chun-Chun	Karena Lam, Candy Lo, Lawrence Chou, Roy Chow, Patrick Tang	Comedy, Young Adult	
Turn Left, Turn Right	Johnnie To	Takeshi Kaneshiro, Gigi Leung	Romance	
The Twins Effect	Dante Lam	Ekin Cheng, Charlene Choi, Gillian Chung, Edison Chen, Jackie Chan	Action / Adventure / Suspense	
