= Grade 1 (disambiguation) =

Grade 1 may refer to:

- First grade, the first school year of primary education.
- A Grade 1 Graded stakes race horse race
- Grade One (TV series), a 2014 Chinese TV variety show
- Grade I listed building, UK heritage designation
