= Chen Xuedong =

Chinese actor

- Born: 28 June 1990 (age 36); Wenzhou, Zhejiang, China
- Other name: Cheney Chen
- Education: Shanghai Conservatory of Music
- Occupations: Actor; Singer
- Years active: 2013–present
- Agent: Hesong Media

Chinese name
- Traditional Chinese: 陳學冬
- Simplified Chinese: 陈学冬
Transcriptions
Standard Mandarin
- Hanyu Pinyin: Chén Xuédōng
- Musical career
- Genre: Mandopop
- Instrument: Vocals

Chen Xuedong (simplified Chinese: 陈学冬; traditional Chinese: 陳學冬; pinyin: Chén Xuédōng, born 28 June 1990), also known as Cheney Chen, is a Chinese actor and singer. He is best known for his role as Zhou Chongguang in the film series Tiny Times (2013–2015).

== Career ==
=== Predebut ===
Chen was born in Wenzhou, Zhejiang. He worked as a part-time model at the age of 17. He later graduated from the Shanghai Conservatory of Music with a degree in musical drama. Prior to his debut as an actor, Chen trained to be a singer at Cube Entertainment in Korea and was selected to be in the lineup for BTOB. In 2012, he began filming his first acting role in Tiny Times.

=== 2013–2015: Tiny Times and Rising popularity ===
Chen made his big screen debut in the first installment of Tiny Times, directed by Guo Jingming. The film was a huge commercial success and broke various film records in China. Thereafter, he starred in the subsequent installments of the film series from 2013 to 2015. Tiny Times became a hugely successful movie franchise in China, and propelled Chen into fame.

In 2014, Chen also joined Hunan TV's variety show Grade One where he assumed the role of a temporary homeroom teacher. The same year, Chen starred in his first comedy film, Bad Sister where he acted as a barista.

In 2015, Chen was announced to be the Chinese dub for Paddington Bear in the comedy film, Paddington. The same year, he starred in the comedy film Oh My God, produced by Zhang Ziyi.

=== 2016–present: Mainstream success ===
In 2016, Chen starred in the youth fashion drama Yes! Mr. Fashion. This marks his first small-screen leading role. The same year, he starred in spy drama, Decoded where he played the role of an autistic mathematical genius. Decoded was a commercial success, and Chen won the Best On-screen Performance award with Ying Er at the China TV Drama Awards.

Chen reunited with Tiny Times director Guo in the fantasy blockbuster L.O.R.D: Legend of Ravaging Dynasties. The same year, he starred in Zhang Yimou's historical film The Great Wall.

In 2017, he made his walkway debut at the Dolce & Gabbana Fall runway for the Milan Fashion Week in January. In June, he starred in the youth melodrama Rush to the Dead Summer. The same year he starred in the caper film The Big Call, the first Chinese movie to focus on telecommunications fraud. Chen ranked 40th on Forbes China Celebrity 100 list in 2017.

In 2018, Chen starred in the wuxia film Kung Fu Monster. The same year, he was cast in the youth musical drama So Young.

== Philanthropy ==
On 29 August 2013, Chen participated a welfare community programme named "Transparent Love". On 27 May 2017, he became a goodwill ambassador for a foundation which helps autistic children in China. On 9 September 2017, Chen attended the 2017 Harpers Bazaar Star Charity Night and donated 10 ambulances, which were worth 700 thousand yuan (RMB).

== Filmography ==
=== Film ===
Year	English title	Chinese title	Role	Notes
2013	Tiny Times	小时代	Zhou Chongguang	
2013	Tiny Times 2	小时代2：青木时代	Zhou Chongguang	
2014	Tiny Times 3	小时代3：刺金时代	Zhou Chongguang	
2014	Bad Sister	坏姐姐之拆婚联盟	Huang Yifeng	
2015	Tiny Times 4	小时代4：灵魂尽头	Zhou Chongguang	
2015	Oh My God	从天儿降	Chen Mo	
2015	Paddington	—N/a	Paddington	Voice-dubbed
2016	Mr. High Heels	高跟鞋先生	Lin Sensen	
2016	L.O.R.D: Legend of Ravaging Dynasties	爵迹	Qi Ling	
2016	The Great Wall	长城	Imperial Commander	
2017	The Big Call	巨额来电	Ding Xiaotian	
2018	Kung Fu Monster	武林怪兽	Zhen Jian	
TBA	L.O.R.D: Legend of Ravaging Dynasties 2	爵迹2：冷血狂宴	Qi Ling	

=== Television series ===
Year	English title	Chinese title	Role	Notes
2014	Tiny Times	小时代之折纸时代	Lu Zhiwen	
2016	Yes! Mr. Fashion	是！尚先生	Shang Boran	
2016	Decoded	解密	Rong Jinzhen	
2017	Rush to the Dead Summer	夏至未至	Fu Xiaosi	
TBA	So Young	小夜曲	Feng Anning	
TBA	You Can't Catch Me	南十字星浪漫笔记	Hao Weilai	
TBA	Greenwich Mean Time	格林威治时间	Han Chi	

=== Variety show ===
Year	English title	Chinese title	Role	Notes
2014	Grade One	一年级	Cast member	
2016	Challenger Alliance	挑战者联盟	Cast member	Season 2
2017	Challenger Alliance	挑战者联盟	Cast member	Season 3
2018	Crossover Singer	跨界歌王	Contestant	Season 3
2018	Baby Let Me Go	放开我北鼻 第三季	Cast member	
2019	My Little One	我家那小子	Cast member	
2020	The Irresistible	元气满满的哥哥	Cast member	

== Discography ==
Year	English title	Chinese title	Album	Notes
2013	"Heart Beating"	面面心跳	Tiny Times OST	
2013	"Innocent Matters"	萬物無邪	Tiny Times OST	
2014	"Don't Say Goodbye"	不再见	Tiny Times 3 OST	
2014	"First Grade"	一年級	Grade One OST	
2015	"Stitching Together our Youth"	岁月缝花	Tiny Times 4 OST	
2015	"We Are All The Same"	我们都一样		
2016	"I Mean"	碎碎戀	Yes! Mr. Fashion OST	
2016	"Sand in the Mortal Realm"	人间沙	L.O.R.D: Legend of Ravaging Dynasties OST	
2019	"My Motherland and I"	我和我的祖国	Qing Chun Wei Zu Guo Er Chang	
2019	"Starry Sea"	星辰大海		For China Movie Channel Young Actors Project with 31 other actors

== Awards and nominations ==
Major awards
Year	Award	Category	Nominated work	Result	Ref.
2013	16th Shanghai International Film Festival	Best New Actor	Tiny Times	Nominated	
2015	19th China Music Awards	Best Breakthrough Singer	"Don't Say Goodbye"	Won	
Others
2008	New Silk Road Model Competition	Best Model (Zhejiang Region)	—N/a	Won	
2008	Fashion Power Awards	Breakthrough New Artist of the Year	—N/a	Won	
2008	Sina Celebrity Rank Ceremony	Best Popularity Award	—N/a	Won	
2013	BQ Celebrity Award	New Actor of the Year (Film)	—N/a	Won	
2013	4th LeTV Awards	Rising Actor (Film)	—N/a	Won	
2013	Young Choice Awards	Most Popular New Actor	—N/a	Won	
2014	BAZAAR Men's Style	Most Attractive Celebrity of the Year	—N/a	Won	
2014	2014 Youku Night	Most Attractive Figure	—N/a	Won	
2015	12th Weibo Awards	Weibo God	—N/a	Won	
2015	BAZAAR Men's Style	Most Attractive Celebrity of the Year	—N/a	Won	
2016	13th Esquire Man at His Best Awards	Most Popular Male Artiste	—N/a	Won	
2016	Baidu Fans Appreciation Season	Figure of the Year	—N/a	Won	
2016	8th China TV Drama Awards	Best On-screen Performance	Decoded	Won	
2017	14th Esquire Man at His Best Awards	Breakthrough Actor	—N/a	Won	
2017	BAZAAR Men of the Year	Most Attractive Celebrity of the Year	—N/a	Won	
2019	Cosmo Glam Night	Person of The Year (Love)	—N/a	Won	
2019	Sina Fashion Awards	Quality Artist of the Year	—N/a	Won	
