= Yuan Yuan =

Yuan Yuan may refer to:

- Yuan Yuan (actor) (born 1953), Chinese actor
- Yuan Yuan (swimmer) (born 1976), Chinese swimmer
- Yuan Yuan (wrestler) (born 1993), Chinese wrestler
- Yuan Yuan (giant panda) (born 2004), a giant panda at the Taipei Zoo in Taiwan

== See also ==
- Yuanyuan (disambiguation), for people with the given name "Yuanyuan" or "Yuan Yuan"
