= L.O.R.D: Legend of Ravaging Dynasties 2 =

L.O.R.D.: Legend of Ravaging Dynasties 2
- Film poster
- Traditional Chinese: 冷血狂宴
- Simplified Chinese: 冷血狂宴
- Hanyu Pinyin: Leng Xue Kuang Yan
- Directed by: Gu Rong (Note: Executive Director); Guo Jingming
- Written by: Guo Jingming; Li Qian (Note: Associate Screenwriter); Morain
- Produced by: Liu Jun; Zhou Qin
- Starring: Kris Wu; Cheney Chen; William Chan; Amber Kuo; Lin Yun; Roy Wang; Karry Wang; Jackson Yi; Wang Duo
- Cinematography: Randy Che
- Edited by: Yu Baiyang
- Music by: Taku Iwasaki
- Production companies: Le Vision (Beijing); Original Force
- Release date: 4 December 2020
- Running time: 129 minutes
- Country: China
- Language: Mandarin

L.O.R.D.: Legend of Ravaging Dynasties 2 is a 2020 Chinese animated motion capture action fantasy adventure film written and directed by Guo Jingming, the sequel to the first L.O.R.D: Legend of Ravaging Dynasties film. Originally slated to be released in China on 6 July 2018, it was later announced on 27 June that the release would be postponed to a later date due to political reasons. Eventually Fan Bingbing's character was replaced in the movie, and it was released via online streaming on Tencent Video on 4 December 2020. This was Kris Wu's final film.

== Plot ==
In order to complete the last wish of Duke VI, Yin Chen (Kris Wu), Qi Ling (Cheney Chen), Tianshu You Hua (Lin Yun) and the others decide to embark on a journey together to save Gilgamesh, the former Duke I who has been sealed by the Silver Priest. Upon their arrival, they encounter the strongest set of Corroders in You Ming (William Chan), Thalia (Amber Kuo) and Qi La (Wang Duo). A confrontation is inevitable as the darkest secret of the Aslan Empire gradually rises to the surface.

== Cast ==
=== The Righteous ===
- Kris Wu as Yin Chen (Chinese: 银尘), Lord to the 7th degree and former disciple to the 1st degree, Gilgamesh
- Cheney Chen as Qi Ling (Chinese: 麒零), Disciple to the 7th degree Yin Chen.
- Lin Yun as Tianshu You Hua (Chinese: 天束幽花), Disciple to the 6th degree and daughter of the 6th lord; likes Qi Ling
- Wang Duo as Qi La (Chinese: 漆拉), Lord to the 3rd degree
- Roy Wang as one of the Silver Priests (Chinese: 白銀祭司)
- Karry Wang as Frost (Han Shuang Si), the new Duke VI (Chinese: 寒霜似)

=== The Corroders ===
- William Chan as You Ming (Chinese: 幽冥), Lord to the 2nd degree; Thalia's lover
- Amber Kuo as Thalia (Chinese: 特蕾婭), Lord to the 4th degree; You Ming's lover
- Jackson Yi as Prince Yuan Yi (Chinese: 源一度王爵), friend to Qi Ling and son of Zujin, former King of Quancang

== Original soundtrack ==
Song category	Song name	Singer	Lyricists	Composer
Theme song	就算	Jane Zhang	Guo Jingming, Luo Luo	Taku Iwasaki
