= Troublesome Night 6 =

1999 Hong Kong film by Herman Yau

- Film poster

Chinese name
- Traditional Chinese: 陰陽路之兇周刊
- Simplified Chinese: 阴阳路之凶周刊
Transcriptions
Standard Mandarin
- Hanyu Pinyin: Yīn Yáng Lù Zhī Xīong Zhōu Kān
Yue: Cantonese
- Jyutping: Jam1 Joeng4 Lou6 Zi1 Hung1 Zau1 Hon1
- Directed by: Herman Yau
- Written by: Nam Yin; Chang Kwok-tse
- Produced by: Nam Yin
- Cinematography: Joe Chan
- Edited by: Chan Kei-hop
- Music by: Mak Chun Hung
- Production companies: Sheen Melody Ltd. Nam Yin Production Co., Ltd.
- Release date: 9 February 1999
- Running time: 110 minutes
- Country: Hong Kong
- Language: Cantonese

Troublesome Night 6 (Chinese: 陰陽路之兇周刊; lit. 'Yin Yang Road: Murder Weekly') is a 1999 Hong Kong horror film produced by Nam Yin and directed by Herman Yau. It is the sixth of the 20 films in the Troublesome Night film series.

== Plot ==
Four years ago, four paparazzi were stalking Kwok Siu-Heung, a model who was dating a rich tycoon. After Kwok fell to her death from a rooftop and landed right in front of them, they meddled with her dead body and snapped photos from various angles before fleeing the scene. The photos made it to the cover story of the magazine.

In the present day, Chak, a police inspector, and his colleagues are investigating the death of one of the paparazzi who was found dead inside a lift. Chak also experiences visions of Kwok's ghost in a red dress and holding a red umbrella; he thinks that she is trying to communicate with him. As Chak and his team uncover more clues pointing to Kwok's suicide, the other three paparazzi die in similar ways as the first.

While drunk, Chak enters a dreamy state and suddenly recalls that he met Kwok on the night she died. They were making out on the rooftop when she dared him to follow suit if she jumped off. Thinking it was a joke, Chak agreed and told her that he would be next if she died. To his horror, she plunged to her death in front of him. He immediately rushed down and tried to call for help but was knocked down by a car. After recovering from a coma, he could not remember what happened that night – until now. Kwok's ghost appears to Chak and reminds him of what he promised her.

== Cast ==
- Louis Koo as Chak
- Gigi Lai as Kwok Siu-Heung
- Simon Lui as Chung
- Amanda Lee as Long Hair
- Wayne Lai as Mr. Lai
- Frankie Ng as Bob
- Peter Ngor as Alan
- Law Lan as Kwok's mother
- Nnadia Chan as Kwok Siu-Lin
- Lam Yi-tung as Fan
- Man Sai as Vore
- Belinda Hamnett as Mrs. Lin
- Fung Hong-ling as Lin Tianzheng
- Raymond Leung as Officer Lau
- Ronald Wong as bar waiter
