= My Family (Hong Kong TV series) =

- Promo poster
- 甜孫爺爺
- Genre: Modern Comedy
- Starring: Chung King Fai; Ha Yu; Hawick Lau; Alex Fong; Shirley Yeung; Sam Chan; Rebecca Chan
- Narrated by: Hawick Lau
- Opening theme: "幸福家庭" by Alex Fong
- Ending theme: "頭等" by Hawick Lau
- Country of origin: Hong Kong
- Original language: Cantonese
- No. of episodes: 20

Production
- Producer: Amy Wong
- Running time: 45 minutes (approx.)

Original release
- Network: TVB
- Release: January 31 – February 25, 2005

My Family (Chinese: 甜孫爺爺) is a TVB modern drama series broadcast in January 2005.

== Synopsis ==
Experience grows with age,
When wise old grand pa is in charge,
The family is in good shape.

Man Tai-Lor (Chung King Fai) controls the Man family with an iron fist, much to the displeasure of his son Man Chiu-Kit (Ha Yu), who is constantly trying to assert his authority within the family. When Tai-Lor developed Parkinson's disease, he hides his anxieties by retiring from his job as a school principal and concealing his ailment from his family. When the truth is revealed, he decides to step down as the patriarch of his family and lets Chiu-Kit run the family.

Relationships in the family worsen when eldest son Freeman Man Yat-Long (Hawick Lau) moves out. He and second son Ray Man Yat-Hei (Alex Fong) end up competing for the same girl, an aspiring cake maker named Miki Mo See-Ting (Shirley Yeung). The third son, Kevin Man Yat-Ching (Sam Chan) becomes especially rebellious as his father tries to assert himself as the family patriarch by implementing stricter and less reasonable rules for his sons to follow. When the Man family starts teetering off the track, the old and retired Tai-Lor has to step in to clear the mess and gently guide everyone back...

== Cast ==
Cast	Role	Description
Chung King Fai	Man Tai-Lor 文泰來	Retired Principal; Man Chiu-Kit's father. Man Yat-Long, Man Yat-Hei, and Man Yat-Ching's grandfather.
Ha Yu	Man Chiu-Kit 文超傑	Health Inspector; Man Wong Mei-Sin's husband. Man Tai-Lor's son. Man Yat-Long, Man Yat-Hei, and Man Yat-Ching's father.
Rebecca Chan	Man Wong Mei-Sin 文王美仙	Housewife, high school teacher Ning Mao-Chun's wife. Man Yat-Long, Man Yat-Hei, and Man Yat-Ching's mother.
Hawick Lau	Man Yat-Long (Freeman) 文逸朗	Singer; Mo Si-Ting's ex-boyfriend. Man Yat-Hei and Man Yat-Ching's older brother.
Alex Fong	Man Yat-Hei (Ray) 文逸晞	Pastry Chef; Mo Si-Ting's boyfriend. Man Yat-Long and Man Yat-Ching's brother.
Sam Chan	Man Yat-Ching (Kevin) 文逸清	Student; Man Yat-Long and Man Yat-Hei's younger brother.
Shirley Yeung	Mo See-Ting (Miki) 毛思婷	Pastry Chef; Man Yat-Long's ex-girlfriend. Man Yat-Hei's girlfriend. Akubi's assistant.
Belinda Hamnett	Akubi	Singer/Actress

== Awards ==
- Ha Yu won the "Best Actor in a Supporting Role" Award for his role Man Chiu-Kit, at the 38th TVB Anniversary Awards in 2005.
