= L.O.R.D: Legend of Ravaging Dynasties =

L.O.R.D.: Legend of Ravaging Dynasties
- Theatrical release poster
- Traditional Chinese: 爵跡
- Simplified Chinese: 爵迹
- Hanyu Pinyin: Jue ji
- Directed by: Gu Rong (Note: Executive Director); Huang Changzuo; Guo Jingming
- Written by: Guo Jingming; Li Qian (Note: Associate Screenwriter)
- Produced by: Liu Jun; Zhou Qin
- Starring: Fan Bingbing; Kris Wu; Cheney Chen; Lin Yun; William Chan; Amber Kuo; Yang Mi; Aarif Rahman; Yan Yikuan; Roy Wang; Wang Duo
- Cinematography: Randy Che
- Edited by: Qiao Aiyu
- Music by: Yuki Kajiura
- Production companies: Heli Chen'guang International Media; Shanghai Zestful Unique Ideal Media; Le Vision Pictures (Beijing); Original Force
- Distributed by: Le Vision Pictures (Beijing)
- Release date: 30 September 2016
- Running time: 117 minutes
- Country: China
- Language: Mandarin
- Box office: $58 million

L.O.R.D.: Legend of Ravaging Dynasties is a 2016 Chinese animated motion capture action fantasy adventure film written and directed by Guo Jingming. It was released in China by Le Vision Pictures on 30 September 2016 in 3D and IMAX 3D. A sequel was released via online streaming on Tencent Video on 4 December 2020. The first sequel was also released on Netflix in December 2022.

== Plot ==
The Odin Mainland is separated into four countries, in each lives a group of soul masters protecting their county with their soul powers. The most powerful seven of them are known as Noble Lords. The story begins in the water origin, the Aslan Empire.

Qi Ling (Cheney Chen), who has been a busboy in an inn since his youth, tames a legendary soul beast, Ice Fang, in a battle between soul masters. Yin Chen (Kris Wu), Lord to the 7th degree, arrives on orders of the Silver Priest (Roy Wang) to take him in as his disciple. With his help, Qi Ling heads to the Grave of the Souls to seek his soul weapon. Overtaken by his restlessness, he disobeys his lord's instructions, and enters the Grave of the Souls with Tianshu You Hua (Lin Yun) and Guishan Lian Quan (Fan Bingbing). Qi Ling thus becomes embroiled in the Upcoming Storm; a battle of soul powers between the lords.

Simultaneously, another conspiracy that has long been in the works within the Aslan Empire is gradually revealing itself. While searching for Qi Ling, Yin Chen discovers that his master, the former 1st lord Gilgamesh may still be alive, and thus risks everything to begin the search for his previous master. At the same time, the Corroders You Ming (William Chan) and Thalia (Amber Kuo) received the Silver Priest's orders to kill Guishan Lian Quan and her brother, Guishen Feng Hun (Yan Yikuan). A battle between the lords and disciples, in a fight for truth and honor, thus ensues.

== Cast ==
=== The Righteous ===
- Fan Bingbing as Guishan Lian Quan (Lotus) (Chinese: 鬼山莲泉), sister and disciple to the 5th degree. Like her brother she possesses the power to control soul beasts. She then inherits the titles of Lord to the 5th and 6th degrees from the respective Lords after their deaths.
- Kris Wu as Yin Chen (Silver) (Chinese: 银尘), Lord to the 7th degree and former disciple to the 1st degree, Gilgamesh. Possesses the unique power to own an infinite number of Horcruxes, spiritual equipment that wields extreme power.
- Cheney Chen as Qi Ling (Asval) (Chinese: 麒零), Disciple to the 7th degree Yin Chen.
- Lin Yun as Tianshu You Hua (Princess Kira) (Chinese: 天束幽花), Disciple to the 6th degree and daughter of the 6th lord; likes Qi Ling. Possesses the power of hyper-regeneration. She has an incomplete soul cycle inherited from her mother, who was the disciple to the 6th degree. Wields a bow as her Horcrux.
- Yan Yikuan as Guishan Feng Hun (Wind Walker) (Chinese: 鬼山縫魂), Lord to the 5th degree; Guishan Lian Quan's elder brother. Possesses the power to control soul beasts. Passes on his title as the Lord to the 5th degree to his sister and disciple after his death by the Lord to the 2nd degree.
- Roy Wang as one of the Silver Priests (Chinese: 白銀祭司)

=== The Corroders ===
- William Chan as You Ming (Dark) (Chinese: 幽冥), Lord to the 2nd degree; Thalia's lover. Makes use of the Wraith Mirror, which reflects everyone except for those have more spiritual power than the user and those who have no spiritual power.
- Amber Kuo as Thalia (Lady Nox) (Chinese: 特蕾婭), Lord to the 4th degree; You Ming's lover with the power to see spiritual lines and power in all creatures. Uses the Hem of the Goddess, a piece of divine cloth.
- Yang Mi as Shen Yin (Eron) (Chinese: 神音), Disciple to the 2nd degree; has an ambiguous relationship with Ni Hong. An individual with the power of reactive evolution.
- Aarif Rahman as Ni Hong (Neon) (Chinese: 霓虹), Disciple to the 4th degree; has an ambiguous relationship with Shen Yin. He is a mute that is loyal to his lord.
- Wang Duo as Qi La (Zila) (Chinese: 漆拉), Lord to the 3rd degree, has power over time and space.

=== Soul Beasts ===
- Guo Jingming as Scorpion (Chinese: 雪刺), Yin Chen's soul beast
- Hu Hanchi as Ice Fang (Chinese: 苍雪之牙), Qi Ling's soul beast. It has the appearance of a white, winged, male lion. He is currently missing after saving Qi Ling from a monster at the Grave of Souls.

== Theme music ==
Song Category	Song Name	Singer	Lyricists	Composer	Notes
Theme song	灵犀一动	Han Hong	Guo Jingming, Luo Luo	Yuki Kajiura	
Ending theme song	人间沙	Cheney Chen	Guo Jingming, Luo Luo	Yuki Kajiura	

== Release ==
The film was released in China on September 30, 2016 and on the same day in international markets like the United Kingdom and Ireland, Australia and New Zealand, and the United States and Canada by Lionsgate. Regarding the film's global release, a representative from Le Vision Pictures, the movie's producer, which is handling distribution in Greater China said, "Lionsgate appreciated the film's potential for YA audiences around the world. They felt it fit in well with their track record of success with films in this genre, such as The Hunger Games and Twilight franchises."

== Reception ==
L.O.R.D.: Legend of Ravaging Dynasties opened in four markets – China, UK, Australia and New Zealand – in its opening weekend and grossed a total of $29.2 million, debuting in second place at the Chinese box office chart, behind I Belonged to You and Miss Peregrine's Home for Peculiar Children on the international box office chart. In China alone, the film made $1.28 million in previews and booked 35% of all available screens and grossed $29 million (of the $29.2 million weekend total). In 325 IMAX theaters, it earned $2.3 million. The film benefitted hugely from the National Day holiday. The film's earnings fell significantly after its opening day due to poor word of mouth and competition from Operation Mekong. It has grossed $53.8 million in four markets of which China's contribution is $53.6 million. It next opened in Singapore.
