= Oh My God (2015 film) =

- Official poster
- 从天儿降
- Directed by: Wei Nan; Wei Min
- Written by: Xi Li; Pan Jingdu; Wei Min; Jun Yang; You Sihan
- Produced by: Zhang Ziyi; Wei Nan
- Starring: Lay Zhang; Li Xiaolu; Cheney Chen; Coco Jiang Wen
- Production companies: Beijing Starlit Entertainment Co., Ltd; China Film Co., LTD; Le Vision Pictures; Youth Film Studio of Beijing Film Academy; Beijing MaxTimes Culture Development Co., Ltd.
- Distributed by: China Film Co., Ltd. Beijing Film Distribution Branch; Wuzhou Film Distribution; Beijing Starlit Entertainment Co., Ltd
- Release date: December 4, 2015 (China)
- Running time: 99 minutes
- Country: China
- Language: Mandarin
- Box office: CN¥56 million

Oh My God (Chinese: 从天儿降) (also known as The Baby from the Universe and Children Fallen from the Skies) is a 2015 Chinese romantic comedy science fiction film directed by Wei Nan and Wei Min and produced by Zhang Ziyi. The film stars Lay Zhang, Li Xiaolu, Cheney Chen and Coco Jiang Wen.

== Plot ==
The movie tells the story of a couple who fervently prayed for a blessing. In answer to their earnest request, they were gifted with a child. From then on, the new family of two couples traverses life.

Chen Mo and Mo Han, Le Yi and Mega are close friends of which live together. While living together a meteor crashed through their roof which morphed into a baby. The four soon became baby sitters. Gradually they found this baby possesses magical powers. Followed by a string of events, they were matured by the responsibilities and fostering of the baby.

== Cast ==
- Zhang Yixing as Le Yi
- Li Xiaolu as Lu Miga
- Cheney Chen as Chen Mo
- Coco Jiang Wen as Mohan
- Zhang Ziyi as herself

== Soundtrack ==
All tracks are written by Oh My God Soundtrack.

No.	Title	Writer(s)	Length
1.	"Happy Youth"	Lay	03:37

The song was sung by Lay, Li Xiaolu and Coco Jiang Wen.

== Release and reception ==
=== Box office ===
The film grossed CN¥56 million at the Chinese box office.

=== Accolades ===
List of awards and nominations
Award	Category	Nominee	Results	Ref.
The 7th Golden Broom Awards for Chinese Films	Most Disappointing Film		Won	
The 7th Golden Broom Awards for Chinese Films	Most Disappointing Director	Wei Nan and Wei Min		
The 6th Douban Film Awards	Lousiest Movie		Won	
The 6th Douban Film Awards	Lousiest Director	Wei Nan and Wei Min		
The 6th Douban Film Awards	Lousiest Actor	Chen Xuedong	Won	
The 2nd Douban Film Annual	Lowest Rating Chinese Movie		Won	

=== Critical response ===
There were mixed opinions about the film. The film garnered substantial reviews that questioned the overall logicality and the abrupt ending. However, actor Chen Xuedong was still praised by netizens for their improved acting skills and the plot of man baby-sitting infants with highlights on responsibility and family life.

=== Ratings ===
The movie garnered a 7.6/10 rating and 31,877,503 viewers on Youku. Mtime rated the movie at 5.0/10.

== Promotion ==
=== Premiere ===
On August 4, a pre-release premiere was held to introduce the cast and announce the prospects of the film. Two subsequent premieres were held at Beijing on November 3 and December 1.

=== Music video ===
A music video featuring the singers of the theme song, Zhang Yixing (Lay), Li Xiaolu and Coco Jiang Wen was dropped one day before the release of the film. The song was composed by Zhang Yixing himself.
