= Invisible Superman =

Invisible Superman 隱形超人

Studio album by Amber Kuo
- Released: 12-25-2007
- Genre: Pop
- Label: Warner Music

Amber Kuo chronology
| Invisible Superman 隱形超人 (2007) | i amber 愛異想 (2009) |

Invisible Superman (Chinese: 隱形超人, Hanyu Pinyin: Yǐnxíng Chāorén) is Amber Kuo's first Chinese language album.

== Track listing ==
1. I Remember
2. I Need You
3. Shopping Tomorrow / Shopping 明天
4. Quickly ( Kuai Yi Dian ) / 快一點
5. Invisible Superman / 隱形超人
6. Honestly Thinking About You / 誠實地想你
7. Qian Chuai De Bei Ying / 欠踹的背影
8. Wo De Wei Lai Shi / 我的未來式
9. Zou Lu Fei Xing / 走路飛行
10. Ai Qing Ding Ge / 愛情定格

== MV ==
1. I Remember
2. I Need You
3. Quickly / 快一點
4. Invisible Superman / 隱形超人
5. Thinking About You in the Truth / 誠實地想你
6. Love's Freeze-Frame / 愛情定格
