= Bad Sister (2014 film) =

- Theatrical poster
- Directed by: Kim Tae-kyun
- Written by: Bang Ni Bo
- Produced by: Fan Xiaoqing; Ji Erwei; Liu Kailuo; Mao Chao; Song Wei; You Ya; Allen Zhu
- Starring: Ivy Chen; Ji Jin-hee; Cheney Chen; Christy Chung; Qi Xi; Li Xinyun; Hyelim
- Cinematography: Zheng Hanche
- Edited by: Choi Jae-geun
- Music by: Kim Tae-seong; Jin Taixing
- Production companies: Heyi Film; Youku Tudou Co.
- Release date: November 28, 2014
- Running time: 108 minutes
- Country: China
- Language: Mandarin
- Box office: ¥8.79 million

Bad Sister (Chinese: 坏姐姐之拆婚联盟) is a 2014 Chinese romantic comedy film directed by Kim Tae-kyun and starring Ivy Chen, Ji Jin-hee and Cheney Chen. The film was released on November 28, 2014.

== Plot ==
The story of a father who wants to stop his daughter's wedding and ended up teaming with the groom's equally disapproving older sister.

== Cast ==
- Ivy Chen
- Ji Jin-hee
- Cheney Chen
- Christy Chung
- Qi Xi
- Li Xinyun
- Woo Hye-lim
- Liu Yiwei
- Xie Dongshen
- Liu Xunzimo

== Box office ==
By December 5, 2014, the film had earned ¥8.79 million at the Chinese box office.
