= Summer Time (album) =

Studio album by Roy Wang
- Released: June 16, 2021 (digital album)
- Genre: Mandopop; Hip pop; Trap
- Length: 29:02
- Language: Chinese, English
- Producer: Roy Wang; Henry Lau; Bernard Zheng; Lingtao Cheng; Boming Lei; Tao Yang

Roy Wang chronology
The 400 Blows (2020)	Summer Time (2021)

Summer Time (Chinese: 夏野了) is the third studio album by Chinese singer-songwriter Roy Wang. It was released digitally on June 16, 2021, through KuGou Music, and was among the most popular Chinese pop albums of 2021.

The album contains eight songs in four chapters. The chapters "Whisper", "Whim", and "Serendipity" are solo, and the last chapter "Ignition" has two songs where Wang collaborated with Henry Lau and Jello Rio.

In this album, Wang appeared as a lyricist, composer, arranger, and producer. His style spanned several genres such as downtempo pop, urban pop, hip hop, and trap music.

== Background ==
On December 15, 2021, a first limited edition of the physical album was pre-sold, and 20,000 copies of the album were sold out. Rumors were that scalpers were reselling the album. Roy Wang Studio immediately decided to relaease a second edition, which was released on December 18, 2021. The pre-order was unlimited, but offered for sale in a limited time. The difference from the first-run limited edition is that the album number is not displayed.

== Accolades ==
Summer Time was included in the "100 must-listen albums of the Year" at the 2021 QQ Music Awards, First place for the most popular Top 10 Album of the year at Tencent Music. It also earned first place as 2021 album of the year at the Douban Awards, and second place among the Most Popular Album of the Year at the Douban Awards.

== Track listing ==
No.	Title	Writer(s)	Length
1.	"Fall for You"	Lingtao Chen, Roy Wang, Bouer Deng	2:59
2.	"Sorrow but Beautiful"	Wang	2:54
3.	"Fabulous Nuts"	Sisi Duan, Wang, Sihan	2:33
4.	"Gone with the Wind"	BowAswell, Leo1Bee, Wang	3:42
5.	"My Miss Stranger"	Wang, Chen, Tianfang Wang	4:21
6.	"Less is More"	Wang	3:31
7.	"HOME"	Wang, Henry Lau, Gen Neo, Amos Ang	3:53
8.	"By Now"	Wang, JelloRio, Chen	3:27
Total length:			29:02
