= A Chilling Cosplay =

2013 Chinese-Hong Kong film by Wang Guangli

- Film poster
- Traditional Chinese: 制服
- Simplified Chinese: 制服
- Hanyu Pinyin: Zhì Fú
- Jyutping: Zai3 Feok6
- Directed by: Wang Guangli
- Written by: Wang Juan; Deng Xiaoxia; Qin Wei
- Produced by: Han Xiaozhi; Wong Jing; Lan Lixin; Shang Xuemei
- Starring: Simon Yam; Vivian Hsu; Ying Er; Yuan Hong
- Production companies: Henan Film Group; Beijing Ifilmfilm Art and Culture Company; China Film Company; Orange Sky Golden Harvest; Zhejiang Hengdian Film Distribution; Mega-Vision Pictures; Henan Film Studio; Shanghai Youchuang Film and TV Culture; Wanda Film and Television Media; Dadi Century Films
- Distributed by: China Film Company; Orange Sky Golden Harvest; Zhejiang Hengdian Film Distribution; Wanda Film and Television Media; Dadi Century Films; Shanghai Film Company Film and TV Distribution Subsidiary Company; Mega-Vision Pictures; Gala Film Distribution
- Release dates: 29 October 2013 (China); 7 November 2013 (Hong Kong)
- Running time: 95 minutes
- Countries: China; Hong Kong
- Language: Mandarin

A Chilling Cosplay is a 2013 crime thriller film directed by Wang Guangli and starring Simon Yam, Vivian Hsu, Ying Er and Yuan Hong. A Chinese-Hong Kong co-production, the film was released on 29 October and 7 November 2013 in mainland China and Hong Kong respectively.

== Plot ==
During a period of time, two cases of murder occurred in the community. The victims include a young woman, whose corpse is said to have been frozen by the murderer using a special technique and being dressed up in a costume afterwards before being discarded like a mere doll. Police Captain Fang Youwei (Simon Yam) and his partner Yan Xiaotong (Ying Er), alongside newly recruited officer Xiao Kai (Yuan Hong) investigate this case. They find out that the two victims were college classmates ten years ago, and also stayed in the same cosplay club. Fang approaches Zhou Jin (Vivian Hsu), who was classmates with the two victims. The appearance of Zhou lends the case a new direction and she seems to be the next target of the murderer.

The murderer hides in the shadow sharpening his blade, grinning in his hatred towards the 3 women. He has waited years to seek merciless revenge. In the era of moral turpitude, everything is fearless, life is worthless.

== Cast ==
- Simon Yam as Fang Youwei (方友為)
- Vivian Hsu as Zhou Jin (周瑾)
- Ying Er as Yan Xiaotong (嚴曉童)
- Yuan Hong as Xiao Kai (肖凯)
- Chen Sicheng as Chen Ansheng (陳岸生)
- Gao Qunshu
- Liu Yiwei
- Wu Yue
- Li Ai
- Ou Di
- Winnie Leung
- Wu Qingqing
- Zhao Xioasu
- Huang Biru
- Yan Jingyao

== See also ==
- Wong Jing filmography
