= Kung Fu Monster =

2018 Chinese-Hong Kong film by Andrew Lau

- Theatrical release poster
- Traditional Chinese: 武林怪獸
- Simplified Chinese: 武林怪兽
- Hanyu Pinyin: Wǔ Lín Guài Shòu
- Jyutping: Mou2 Lam4 Gwaai3 Sau3
- Directed by: Andrew Lau
- Screenplay by: Rong Chao; Lin Ting; Philip Lui; Ronald Chan
- Produced by: Derek Yee; Mandy Law; Peggy Lee; Rong Chao; Andrew Lau
- Starring: Louis Koo; Cheney Chen; Bao Bei'er; Bea Hayden; Wang Taili; Alex Fong; Zhou Dongyu
- Cinematography: Andrew Lau; Cho Man-keung
- Edited by: Sun Chi-man; Azrael Chung
- Music by: Chan Kwong-wing; Wan Pin Chu
- Production companies: Media Asia Films; Bona Film Group; Film Unlimited
- Distributed by: Media Asia Entertainment Group
- Release date: 21 December 2018
- Running time: 100 minutes
- Countries: Hong Kong; China
- Languages: Cantonese; Mandarin
- Box office: $11.5 million

Kung Fu Monster (Chinese: 武林怪兽), previously translated as When Robbers Meet the Chessboards, is a 2018 wuxia fantasy film co-produced and directed by Andrew Lau and starring Louis Koo, Cheney Chen, Bao Bei'er, Wang Taili, Bea Hayden, with Alex Fong and Zhou Dongyu. A Hong Kong-Chinese co-production, the film began production on 13 April 2017 and wrapped up on 8 June of the same year in Beijing, and was released in December 2018.

== Plot ==
During the Wanli Emperor's reign (reigned 1572 to 1620) in the Ming dynasty, Crane Sun, a cruel supervisor of the Eastern Depot, was ordered to capture monsters that have escaped from the royal palace. At the same time, militia warrior Blade colludes with his martial arts junior Bella and female warrior Frigid to gather a group of forest fighters to rob the silver from corrupt officials. However, the silver was missing, while wanted criminal Ocean Feng appears along with Jianghu wanderer Cypress. As a bigger crisis comes, monsters are lurking nearby.

== Cast ==
Main starring

- Louis Koo as Ocean Feng
- Cheney Chen as Blade
- Bao Bei'er as Cypress
- Wang Taili as Mount
- Bea Hayden as Frigid
- Alex Fong as Crane Sun
- Zhou Dongyu as Bella

Also starring

- Wu Yue as Constable Wang
- Pan Binlong as Saucy
- Kong Lianshun as Dash
- Liang Dawei as Crane's underling #1
- Liu Hao as Crane's underling #2

Guest appearances

- Ying Er
- Ken Lo
- Fiona Sit
- Peter Ho
- Sam Lee

== Soundtracks ==
Name	Artist	Type
凡人英雄歌	Tengger	Theme song
招财进宝 (Lucky Fortune)	Yang Chaoyue	Holiday Theme song
