= Women on the Run (TV series) =

- Poster
- 窈窕熟女
- Genre: Modern Drama
- Starring: Natalis Chan; Christine Ng; Joyce Tang; Kingdom Yuen; Belinda Hamnett; Louis Yuen; Joyce Chen
- Opening theme: "她的主義" by Natalis Chan
- Country of origin: Hong Kong
- Original language: Cantonese
- No. of episodes: 26

Production
- Running time: 45 minutes (approx.)

Original release
- Network: TVB
- Release: July 17, 2005 – February 5, 2006

Women on the Run (Traditional Chinese: 窈窕熟女) is a TVB modern drama series broadcast in July 2005 to February 2006 on Sundays.

== Synopsis ==
Four beautiful and successful ladies, and a mean, but brilliant detective,
Explore the mysterious world of modern women.

== Cast ==
Cast	Role	Description
Natalis Chan	Pat Kei-Lei/Gam Gwai-Cheung 畢奇理/金貴祥	Detective
Christine Ng	Chan Bong-Nei (Bonnie) 陳邦妮	35 years old PR Company Owner
Joyce Tang	Ma Siu-Bo 馬小寶	33 years old Police Officer
Kingdom Yuen (苑瓊丹)	Li Tsang-Tsang 李真真	36 years old Feng Shui Reader
Belinda Hamnett	Chu Chu (Yvonne) 朱珠	34 years old One Some Cafe Owner
Louis Yuen (阮兆祥)	Tung Fai 董輝	Pat Kei-Lei's assistant. Ho Kei-Mei's boyfriend.
Joyce Chen (陳彥行)	Ho Kei-Mei 何其美	Ho Moon Chuk (好滿足) Feet Massage Clerk; Tung Fai's girlfriend.
Li Kwok Lun (李國麟)	Chai Kwok-Yung 柴國勇	Police Officer
Lo Hoi Pang (盧海鵬)	Wu Moon 胡滿	Ho Moon Chuk (好滿足) Feet Massage Owner
Suet Nei (雪妮)	Gam Lo-Tai 金老太	Gam Gwai-Cheung's mother.
Mandy Cho	Tong Man-Tsi 湯敏芝	Lawyer/Accountant/Actuary

Episode 1

Cast	Role	Description
Tsui Wing		
Kenny Wong		
Jason Lam		
Joel Chan		
Chacha Chan		

Episode 2

Cast	Role	Description
Ellesmere Choi		
Eileen Yeow		

Episode 3

Cast	Role	Description
Yoyo Chen		
Ram Chiang		

Episode 4

Cast	Role	Description
Matt Yeung		
Gordon Lau		

Episode 5

Cast	Role	Description
Carlo Ng		

Episode 6

Cast	Role	Description
Angela Tong
Deno Cheung

Episode 7

Cast	Role	Description
Mark Kwok		
Mannor Chan		

Episode 8

Cast	Role	Description
Lam King Kong		
Halina Tam		

Episode 9

Cast	Role	Description
Savio Tsang		
Rabee'a Yeung		

Episode 10

Cast	Role	Description
Tiffany Lee (李蘢怡)	Yuki	
Chang Tse-sheng		
Gregory Lee		
Florence Kwok		
Wah Chong Lam		

Episode 11-

Cast	Role	Description
Kong Hon		Episode 11–14
Ken Wong Hap-hei		Episode 11–15

== Viewership ratings ==
	Week	Episode	Average Points	Peaking Points	References
1	July 17, 2005	1	29	—	
2	July 24, 2005	2	24	—	
3	July 31, 2005	3	26	—	
4	August 7, 2005	4	25	—	
5	August 14, 2005	5	21	—	
6	August 21, 2005	6	26	—	
7	August 28, 2005	7	20	—	
8	September 4, 2005	8	23	—	
9	September 11, 2005	9	22	—	
10	September 18, 2005	10	20	—	
11	September 25, 2005	11	24	—	
12	October 2, 2005	12	21	—	
13	October 9, 2005	13	22	—	
14	October 23, 2005	14	21	—	
15	October 30, 2005	15	21	—	
16	November 6, 2005	16	17	—	
17	November 13, 2005	17	18	—	
18	November 20, 2005	18	19	—	
19	November 27, 2005	19	18	—	
20	December 4, 2005	20	20	—	
21	January 1, 2006	21	21	—	
22	January 8, 2006	22	19	—	
23	January 15, 2006	23	—	—	
24	January 22, 2006	24	21	—	
25	January 29, 2006	25	—	—	
26	February 5, 2006	26	27	30	
