= I Amber =

i amber 愛異想

Studio album by Amber Kuo
- Released: 5 January 2009
- Genre: Pop
- Label: Warner Music

Amber Kuo chronology
Invisible Superman 隱形超人 (2007)	i amber 愛異想 (2009)	Sparklers 煙火 (2010)

i amber (Chinese: 愛異想; pinyin: Ài Yìxiǎng) is Amber Kuo's second Chinese language album. On 3 July 2009, the celebration edition was released with a DVD.

== Track listing ==
1. 又圓了的月亮 You Yuan Le De Yue Liang (Another Full Moon) (04:52)
2. Love & Love (03:03)
3. 天生一對 Tian Sheng Yi Dui (Ft. Nicholas Teo) (Perfect Match) (03:32)
4. 你在，不在 Ni Zai, Bu Zai (You Are Here, Not Here) (04:23)
5. 愛異想 Ai Yi Xiang (03:17)
6. Sorry對不起 Dui Bu Qi (03:36)
7. 愛計較 Ai Ji Jiao (like To Haggle) (02:40)
8. Didadi的美 Didadi De Mei (Didadi Love) (03:42)
9. 狠狠哭 Hen Hen Ku (Cry) (04:34)
10. Rain Won't Stay (03:49)

== DVD ==
1. 又圓了的月亮
2. 你在，不在
3. 愛異想
4. Rain Won't Stay
5. 狠狠哭
6. Behind the Scenes of music video
