= Hawick Lau =

Hong Kong actor and singer (born 1974)

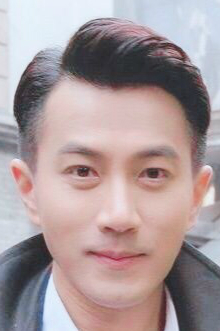
- Lau in 2017
- Born: 13 October 1974 (age 52); British Hong Kong
- Education: Ryerson University (now Toronto Metropolitan University)
- Occupations: Actor; singer; producer
- Years active: 1993–present
- Agent(s): Hawick Lau Studio (2019−present); Jay Walk Studio (2015 - 2019)
- Spouse: Yang Mi (m. 2014; div. 2018)
- Children: 1
- Parents: Lau Dan (father); Lee Fuk-ying (mother)

Chinese name
- Traditional Chinese: 劉愷威
- Simplified Chinese: 刘恺威
- Hanyu Pinyin: Liú Kǎiwēi
- Jyutping: Lau^{4} Hoi^{2} Wai^{1}

Hawick Lau Hoi-wai (Chinese: 劉愷威; born 13 October 1974) is a Hong Kong actor and singer. He was named as one of the "Five Fresh Tigers of TVB" and is best known for his performances in the series A Kindred Spirit (1995), Virtues of Harmony (2001) and My Family (2005).

He then expanded his career into mainland China, acting in several notable series. His notable appearances include Sealed with a Kiss (2011), A Clear Midsummer Night (2013), The Wife's Secret (2014), Lady & Liar (2015) and Chronicle of Life (2016).

== Early life ==
Lau grew up in Hong Kong. He is the son of the Hong Kong actor Lau Dan and his wife Lee Fuk-ying (李馥瑩). Lau studied architecture at Ryerson University in Toronto, Ontario, Canada.

== Career ==
Lau debuted in the 1995 drama A Kindred Spirit. He starred alongside his father Lau Dan, coincidentally portraying father and son. The same year, he signed on with Hong Kong's Sony Music as a singer.

In 1997, he released his first Chinese album LALA I Love You. In 1998, he released his first Cantonese album A Boy's Story.

Lau continued acting in Hong Kong dramas and started to gain fame locally. In 2000, he starred in the youth romance drama Aiming High with Nicholas Tse. He also had a supporting role in the financial thriller At the Threshold of an Era. From 2001 to 2002, he starred in the historical sitcom Virtues of Harmony with his father and later its sequel Virtues of Harmony II in 2003. In January 2005, he starred in modern comedy drama My Family, in his first leading role.

TVB named him as one of the 5 Fresh Tigers – a group of promising young actors that the network pushed to become stars.

In 2005, after having a significant amount of success at TVB, he left the company and traveled to mainland China, Taiwan and Singapore, where he participated in some productions. He filmed his first Mainland production The Hui Merchants of Qing (which aired in 2007). He also starred in the Mediacorp production Destiny; following which he participated in the Taiwanese drama Letter 1949.

In April 2006, Lau signed with ATV, the other main television station and production studio in Hong Kong for one year. In November 2006, Lau's first series with ATV, No Turning Back began airing.

In order to fully immerse himself into the Chinese market, Lau insisted on speaking Mandarin Chinese instead of Cantonese for his media appearances. He started to gain attention from the Chinese audiences for his appearance in the 2008 drama Royal Embroidery Workshop, which also starred Li Xiaoran.

In 2009, he starred in the republican drama Niang Qi, which won him the Best Actor Award at the Jiangsu TV Drama Awards.

In 2011, Lau gained mainstream popularity after starring in the romance melodrama Sealed With a Kiss, gaining recognition from his portrayal of Mo Shaoqian, who was likened to the Asian version of Christian Grey. Lau also starred alongside Wallace Chung in drama Under The Bodhi Tree.

In 2012, Lau starred in the romantic comedy film Holding Love alongside Yang Mi. The movie was released on the day of Qixi Festival, also known as Chinese Valentine’s Day, and topped the box office charts. He again worked with Yang in the period epic drama Ru Yi, which gained attention prior to its premiere due to his and Yang's public relationship at that time.

Lau then established his personal studio, and took on the role of a producer for the first time in the contemporary romance drama A Clear Midsummer Night. The drama aired in 2013 and quickly became popular with the audience, becoming the first drama in 2013 to surpass 100 million views. In April, he starred in the television adaptation of the 2012 hit movie Painted Skin: The Resurrection. His performance in the series won him the Best Actor in the Ancient Drama genre at the 13th Huading Awards. He then returned to TVB, filming the Hong Kong-China joint production Master of Destiny, which aired in 2015.

In 2014, he starred opposite Zhao Liying in the romance drama The Wife's Secret.

In 2015, Lau paired up with Tiffany Tang in the period romance drama Lady & Liar, which broke records to become the most viewed republic era period drama online. His character Bai Zhengqing was popular with the audience, and gained him a large number of fans. Following Lady & Liar, Lau then starred in another period drama The Cage of Love, written by famed writer Tong Hua. Lau also Co-starred with Wang Likun in Twice Bloom the Flower that year.

In 2016, Lau starred in period romance drama Chronicle of Life, portraying Kangxi Emperor. The series gained popularity upon its premiere, placing #1 in ratings nationally and topping online views. In April, the second production by Lau's studio, entitled Road to the North premiered on CNTV. He then starred in the television adaptation of Gu Long's novel The Legend of Flying Daggers.

In 2017, Lau starred in the family drama, Full Love and the legal drama Heirs.

In 2018, Lau took the lead role in the fantasy wuxia drama The Legend of Jade Sword.

In October 2019, it was confirmed that Lau's contract with Jaywalk Studio had expired and he did not renew.

In 2020, Lau starred with Chen Duling in The Invisible Life a modern drama about women struggle in work place.

== Personal life ==
Lau announced his relationship with Chinese actress Yang Mi on 8 January 2012 through Weibo. The two had previously co-starred in Ru Yi, Holding Love and A Clear Midsummer Night.

On 8 January 2014, Lau and Yang got married in Bali, Indonesia. On 1 June 2014, Yang gave birth to their daughter nicknamed Little Sticky Rice (小糯米) in Hong Kong.

On 22 December 2018, Lau and Yang issued a joint-statement announcing their divorce through their agency.

== Filmography ==
=== Film ===
Year	English title	Chinese title	Role	Notes/Ref.
2000		龙凤斗智蟠龙坊	Jin Kezhong	
2003	Bless the Child	某年某月某日	Wong Yong	
2003	The Spy Dad	神勇铁金刚	Hotel employee	
2003	Honesty	绝种好男人	Ah Chong	
2009	Irreversi	回路	Liu Zhiming	
2012	Holding Love	Hold住爱	Tao Xiaolei	
2013	Love in Summer			
TBA		梦瑜伽		Special appearance

=== Television series ===
Year	English title	Chinese title	Role	Notes/Ref.
1995–1999	A Kindred Spirit	真情	Lee Tian An	
1997	Mystery Files	迷離檔案	Cheung Wai	Episodes 7–9
1999	Untraceable Evidence II	鑑證實錄II	Yeung Chi-lun	
1999–2000	At the Threshold of an Era	創世紀	Yip Wing-chak	
2000	Aiming High	撻出愛火花	Cheung Wing-leung	
2001	Law Enforcers	勇探實錄	Lee Lap-ming	
2001–2002	Virtues of Harmony	皆大歡喜	Yuen Sau	
2004-2005	Virtues of Harmony II	皆大歡喜	Lau Ka-sing	
2004	Hard Fate	翡翠戀曲	Mok Hei-man	
2004	Shades of Truth	水滸無間道	Ben Fai	
2004	ICAC Investigators 2004	廉政行動2004	Cheung Lap-san	
2005	My Family	甜孫爺爺	Freeman Man	
2005	Destiny	梦在手里	Fan Yijie	
2006		灯火阑珊	Luo Jiahui	
2006–2007	Relentless Justice	义无反顾	Aaron Yip	
2007		换子成龙	Chen Tianhong	
2007	The Hui Merchants of Qing	大清徽商	Chen Yuanliang	
2007	Shun Niang	顺娘	Chen Wuqiu	
2008	East Hegemon	江湖往事	Xiao Tang	
2008	Royal Embroidery Workshop	凤穿牡丹	Huo Dongqing	
2008	One Thousand Teardrops	一千滴眼泪	Jiang Haotian	
2009	The Single Mother	单亲妈妈	Tai Songping	
2009	Letter 1949	我在1949，等你	Lin Xiang	
2009	Niang Qi	娘妻	Gao Yaozhong	
2010	Happy Mother-in-Law, Pretty Daughter-in-Law	欢喜婆婆俏媳妇	Tie Changsheng	
2010	Who Knows the Female of the Women	谁知女人心	Zhao Anhua	
2010		重生门	Lian Chengwen	
2010	Spell of the Fragrance	国色天香	Xiang Haoyu	
2011	Under the Bodhi Tree (Linden)	菩提树下	Long Wusheng	
2011		大唐女将樊梨花	Xue Dingshan	
2011	Sealed With a Kiss	千山暮雪	Mo Shaoqian	
2011	Love in the War Time	烽火儿女情	Fang Junjie	
2012	Ru Yi	如意	Tan Mingkai	
2012	Sealed With a Kiss Sequel	千山暮雪续集	Mo Shaoqian	Mini series
2012		战火西北狼	Lieutenant Long Douyun	
2012	In Love with Power	山河恋·美人无泪	Hong Taiji	
2013	A Clear Midsummer Night	盛夏晚晴天	Qiao Jinfan	also producer
2013	Painted Skin 2	画皮之真爱无悔	General Wang Ying	
2013	Bloodbath Island	喋血孤岛	Agent Mike	
2014	The Four Scholars of Jiangnan	江南四大才子	Tang Bohu	
2014	The Wife’s Secret	妻子的秘密	Li Minglang	
2015	Lady & Liar	千金女賊	Bai Zhengqing	
2015	The Cage of Love	抓住彩虹的男人	Jiang Yu	
2015	Master of Destiny	縱橫天地	Cho Chi-yuen	
2015	The Double Life of Veronique	两生花	Qin Mo (Chen Bin)	
2015		你的传奇之危机四伏	Mr Mo	Guest appearance
2015	You Are My Sisters	你是我的姐妹	Shi Tianming	
2015	Hummingbird Attack	蜂鸟	Luo Shaoqing	
2016	Chronicle of Life	寂寞空庭春欲晚	Kangxi	
2016	Road to the North	一念向北	Lu Xiangbei	also producer
2016	First Love	柠檬初上	Zuo Zaijun	
2016	The Legend of Flying Daggers	飞刀又见飞刀	Li Huai	
2017	Full Love	周末父母	Yu Zhiyuan	
2017	Heirs	继承人	Zheng Hao	
2018	The Legend of Jade Sword	莽荒紀	Ji Ning	
2018	Our Glamorous Time	你和我的倾城时光	Li Zhiqian	Special appearance
2019	Diplomatic Situation	外交风云	Qian Xuesen	Special appearance
2020	That's life/Invisible life	這就是生活	Guan Yihe	
TBA	Deep Sea	深海	Tang Baihao	

=== Variety and reality show ===
Year	English title	Chinese title	Notes
2022	Call Me by Fire	披荊斬棘	Season 2

== Awards and nominations ==
Year	Award	Category	Nominated work	Result	Ref.
2014	3rd Asia Rainbow TV Awards	Outstanding Leading Actor	A Clear Midsummer Night	Won	
2014	13th Huading Awards	Best Actor (Ancient Drama)	Painted Skin 2	Won	
2017	AATFF Festival Golden Oak Award	Best Actor	Heirs	Won	
