= Sealed with a Kiss (2011 TV series) =

2011 Chinese television series

- DVD cover
- Genre: Romance; Melodrama
- Based on: Qian Shan Mu Xue by Fei Wo Si Cun
- Screenplay by: Guo Baoxian; Jin Yuanyuan
- Directed by: Yang Xuan
- Starring: Hawick Lau; Ying Er
- Country of origin: China
- Original language: Mandarin
- No. of episodes: 30

Production
- Producer: Zhang Shenyan
- Running time: 45 minutes
- Production companies: Xing Sheng Di Movie & Television Culture Co., Ltd.

Original release
- Network: Hunan TV
- Release: 20 November 2011 – 2012

Sealed with a Kiss (Chinese: 千山暮雪) is a 2011 Chinese television series based on the novel Qian Shan Mu Xue by Fei Wo Si Cun. It stars Hawick Lau and Ying Er.

The series was popular and developed a cult following online. Hawick Lau, who portrayed the male lead, was likened to the Asian version of Christian Grey.

== Synopsis ==
Orphaned as a child, Tong Xue lives under the care of her maternal uncle. While she is working at a cafe, she catches the attention of Mo Shaoqian, chairman of Yunzhong Corporation. Little does she know that her father once betrayed Yunzhong Corporation and indirectly caused the death of Mo Shaoqian's father. The company was plunged into a serious crisis and Shaoqian was forced to enter into a political marriage with Mu Yongfei, heiress to Mu Corporation in order to save his company. On their wedding night, Shaoqian was repulsed by Yongfei's possessive and condescending behaviour and refused to live with her. He continuously seeks to divorce Yongfei for the next ten years, but she resolutely refuses despite both living separately and in a loveless marriage. As Shaoqian discovers Tong Xue's identity, he uses criminal evidence against Tong Xue's uncle to blackmail her into living with him as his mistress. As Shaoqian gets to know Tong Xue, he begins to harbor conflicted feelings for her. On the surface, he treats Tong Xue coldly and toys with her emotions. Secretly, Shaoqian cannot help himself falling for Tong Xue and wanting to protect her. However, Tong Xue is not able to let go of her childhood sweetheart. She also fears Shaoqian, wishing and planning for the day when she escapes from his claws. However the moment he finally releases her, it is too late for her to run.

== Cast ==
- Hawick Lau as Mo Shaoqian
- Ying Er as Tong Xue
- Wen Zhenrong as Mu Yongfei (Shaoqian's wife)
- Li Zhinan as Xiao Shan (Tong Xue's first love)
- Leanne Liu as Jiang Yun (Shao Qian's mother)
- Chang Chen-kuang as Mu Changhe (Yongfei's father)
- Zhao Chulun as Mu Zhenfei (Yongfei's younger brother)
- Zhang Ran as Liu Yueying (Tong Xue's best friend)
- Wang Jingluan as Lin Zixian (Xiao Shan's admirer)
- Liu Kenan as Zhao Gaoxing (Yueying's boyfriend)
- Zheng Long as Wen Hao (Shaoqian's assistant)
- Yang Zitong as Su Shanshan / Liu Mengying (Zhenfei's girlfriend)
- Fang Haolun as Zhang Zhiyuan
- Xu Xing as He Jie
- Cheng Yong as Liu Liangchun
- Zhang Jianhong as Housekeeper Ding
- Zhang Gong as Mr. Ma
- Chen Liangping as Jiang Wei (Tong Xue's uncle)
- Fu Chuanjie as Mo Yaohua (Shaoqian's father)
- Hua Mingwei as Tong Wenbin (Tong Xue's father)
- Jiang Kaili as Jiang Wei (Shaoqian's mother)

== Soundtrack ==
Sealed with a Kiss - Original Television Soundtrack (千山暮雪电视剧原声音乐大碟)
No.	Title	Music	Length
1.	"A Thousand Mountains (千山)" (Opening theme song)	Hawick Lau
2.	"Snow Tomb (暮雪)" (Ending theme song)	Ying Er
3.	"Only You Will Understand (非你不懂)"	Ying Er & Li Zhinan

== Ratings ==
Hunan Satellite TV Golden Eagle solo theater
Episode numbers	Ratings(%)	Audience share (%)
1-2	1.05	3.33
3-4	1.36	4.02
5-6	1.32	4.55
7-8	1.65	3.56
9-10	1.56	5.26
11-12	1.78	6.22
13-14	2.03	6.42
15-16	2.15	7.02
17-18	2.45	7.21
19-20	2.36	7.11
21-22	2.68	7.23
23-24	2.89	8.23
25-26	3.14	8.42
27-28	3.20	8.23
29-30	3.25	9.26

== Sequel ==
A 7-episode mini series was subsequently aired via Sohu on 14 January 2012.
