= Unexpected Love =

- Directed by: Bowie Lau
- Starring: Du Chun; Ying Er; Tingjia Chen
- Release date: 14 February 2014 (China)
- Running time: 96 mins
- Country: China
- Language: Mandarin
- Box office: CN¥10.5 million

Unexpected Love (Chinese: 誰說我們不會愛) is a 2014 Chinese romance film directed by Bowie Lau and starring Du Chun and Ying Er. It was released on 14 February 2014.

== Cast ==
- Du Chun
- Ying Er
- Tingjia Chen

== Reception ==
As of 15 February, it has grossed CN¥10.5 million.
