= Bless the Child (2003 film) =

2003 Hong Kong film by Jones Ma

Bless The Child
- Directed by: Jones Ma Wah-Kon
- Written by: Shum Lap-Keung
- Produced by: Ng Kin-Hung
- Starring: Pauline Suen; Belinda Hamnett; Hawick Lau
- Cinematography: Mak Hoi-Man
- Distributed by: B&S Film Distribution Company, LTD
- Release date: 24 July 2003
- Country: Hong Kong
- Language: Cantonese

Bless the Child is a 2003 Hong Kong film directed by Jones Ma Wah-Kon. It was released on 6 October 2003.

== Plot ==
Boni (Pauline Suen) is a frustrated advertising executive that becomes caught in a time loop (19 March).

== Cast ==
- Belinda Hamnett
- Hawick Lau
- Alien Sun as Boni Mok
- Tse Kwan Ho as Sean
- Wong Sum Yue
- Claire Yiu Ka Lai
- Fan Yik-Man
