= Lady & Liar =

- Promotional poster
- Genre: Romance; Period
- Written by: Wu Dawei; Huang Rourou; Chen Xiaohao; Meng Zhi
- Directed by: Chen Yushan
- Starring: Tiffany Tang; Hawick Lau; Yang Rong; Tony Yang
- Country of origin: China
- Original language: Mandarin
- No. of episodes: 46

Production
- Production companies: Shanghai Youhug Media Co., Ltd. East King Culture; Spring Thunder Entertainment

Original release
- Network: Jiangsu TV
- Release: 28 January – 21 February 2015

Lady & Liar (Chinese: 千金女贼) is a 2015 Chinese television series starring Tiffany Tang, Hawick Lau, Yang Rong and Tony Yang. It aired on Jiangsu TV from 28 January to 21 February 2015.

The series surpassed 4 billion views, breaking the record for period dramas in China. It won the "Audience's Favorite TV Drama" award at the 1st China Quality Television Drama Ceremony.

== Synopsis ==
During the chaotic times in the 1930s, lives two girls with two different identities. Jiang Xin is the daughter of the richest household in Tianjin, while Du Xiaohan is a female thief who escaped from prison. On the way to Tianjin, an accident occurs, and Jiang Xin loses her memory. Seeing this as an opportunity, Du Xiaohan falsely assumes Jiang Xin's identity. On the other hand, Jiang Xin wakes up to find herself in the Bai household, where she is now the fiance of Bai Zhengqing, the most powerful businessman in Shanghai. Meanwhile, the man whom Jiang Xin loves deeply is also searching frantically for her. In the midst of evil and kindness, lies and false love, will Jiang Xin be able to recover her identity, and discover where her heart really lies?

== Cast ==
=== Main ===
- Tiffany Tang as Jiang Xin

Also known as the Lady. Having lived in poverty for many years, she discovers that she is the daughter of a rich businessman when she sold her necklace to redeem money for her adoptive father's medicine. She is kind-hearted and pure.

- Hawick Lau as Bai Zhengqing

Also known as White Wolf, a rich and cunning businessman. He falls in love with Jiang Xin after she saved his life; and when he discovered that she lost her memory, decided to lie to her in order to have her stay by his side.

- Yang Rong as Du Xiaohan

Also known as the Liar. A female thief who escaped from the prison after she attacked the policeman who raped her. She falsely assumes Jiang Xin's identity and becomes a rich lady.

- Tony Yang as Sheng Jiewen

Jiang Xin's lover, and Zhengqing's half-brother. He is a talented doctor but after encountering an incident where he was kidnapped by rival businessmen, he lost his eyesight and became depressed. The appearance of Jiang Xin brightens up his life, and they fall in love. When she is missing, he vows to find her no matter what.

=== Supporting ===
- Tai Chih-yuan as Lei Batian
- Zhang Meng as Yao Mi'er
- Zang Hong Na as Chun Hua
- Wang Yanlin as Shi Tou
- Zhang Xin as Xu Guan
- Zhang Ruijia as Qin Lan
- Liang Hsiu-shen as Ye Gongsheng
- Lu Senbao as Tang Hu
- Guo Ziyu as Lei Ziqian
- Wang Yongqiang as Bai Zhengyuan
- Chen Youwang as Jiang Shu
- Cai Zilun as Song Ben
- Li Guohong as Secretary Wang
- Wang Deshun as Uncle Can

== Soundtrack ==
Lady & Liar - Original Television Soundtrack ( 千金女贼电视剧原声音乐大碟)
No.	Title	Music	Length
1.	"Love without Turning Back (愛無反顧)"	Jam Hsiao
2.	"Blossom Knot (桃花結)"	Diana Wang
3.	"How Have You Been (別來無恙)"	Jess Lee
4.	"Love like a Fool (像傻子般愛著)"	Kenji Wu

== Ratings ==
Jiangsu Satellite TV CSM50 City ratings
Original air date	Ratings	Rank
January 28	0.905	4
January 29	0.957	4
January 30	0.974	4
January 31	1.025	3
February 1	1.168	3
February 2	1.222	3
February 3	1.217	3
February 4	1.164	3
February 5	1.223	3
February 6	1.276	2
February 7	1.167	3
February 8	1.166	3
February 9	1.284	3
February 10	1.239	3
February 11	1.329	3
February 12	1.501	2
February 13	1.354	2
February 14	1.363	2
February 15	1.312	3
February 16	1.517	3
February 17	1.438	3
February 20	1.2	2
February 21	1.315	2
Average:	1.231	2015: Rank 2

- Highest ratings are marked in red, lowest ratings are marked in blue
