= Master of Destiny =

2015 Hong Kong-Chinese joint epic television drama

- Official TVB poster
- Also known as: '縱橫天地'
- Traditional Chinese: 風雲天地
- Simplified Chinese: 风云天地
- Hanyu Pinyin: Fēngyún Tiāndì
- Genre: Drama
- Created by: Wong Jing
- Written by: Wong Jing
- Directed by: Wong Jing; David Lau; Steve Cheng
- Starring: Liza Wang; Angie Chiu; Hawick Lau; Tiffany Tang; Monica Mok; Wayne Lai; Selena Li; Kenny Wong; Edwin Siu; Kimmy Tong
- Opening theme: Mainland China: There Is No Such Thing As Perfect Love (原來愛情没有剛剛好) by Li Daimo; Hong Kong: Unbeatable (轟天動地) by Edwin Siu
- Countries of origin: Hong Kong; China
- Original languages: Cantonese; Mandarin (dubbed)
- No. of episodes: China: 40; Hong Kong: 32 (Final)

Production
- Producer: Wong Jing
- Production locations: Tianjin, China; Beijing, China; Hong Kong; France
- Editor: Tie Fo
- Camera setup: Multi camera
- Running time: 45 minutes
- Production companies: Jing's Entertainment Limited; Beijing Energy TV Communication Co., Ltd. Television Broadcasts China Limited; Hong Kong Television Broadcasts Limited

Original release
- Network: Anhui Television
- Release: 28 May 2015
- Network: TVB Jade, HD Jade
- Release: 22 June 2015

Master of Destiny
- Traditional Chinese: 風雲天地
- Simplified Chinese: 风云天地
- Literal meaning: "Across Heaven and Earth"
Transcriptions
Standard Mandarin
- Hanyu Pinyin: Fēngyún Tiāndì
Yue: Cantonese
- Yale Romanization: Fung Wàn Tīn Deih
- Jyutping: Fung1 Wan4 Tin1 Dei6

Master of Destiny (Chinese: 風雲天地; Jyutping: Fung1 Wan4 Tin1 Dei6; literally "Across Heaven and Earth") is a 2015 Hong Kong-Chinese joint epic television drama created by Hong Kong director Wong Jing and produced by his production company Jing's Entertainment Limited. Master of Destiny chronicles the rise and the eventual hardships of the affluent Cho family from Hong Kong, which eventually, they fight the corruption that reeks inside their family, and stars Liza Wang, Angie Chiu, Hawick Lau, Kenny Wong, Edwin Siu, Kimmy Tong, and Monica Mok as the main cast. Filming commenced on 1 August 2013 in Tianjin, China. The mainland China version has 40 episodes and began airing on Anhui Television on 28 May 2015 with Mandarin voice dubbing. Hong Kong broadcast began airing on Jade and HD Jade channels 22 June 2015 every Monday through Friday during its 8:30–9:30 pm timeslot with 32 episodes total. It was distributed by TVBC and TVB International.

The serial is produced under several titles. In Hong Kong, it is known by the title "Chung Wang Tin Dei" (Chinese: 縱橫天地; literally "across the world unhindered"). In mainland China, it is known as "Fengyun Tiandi" (Chinese: 風雲天地; literally "Across Heaven and Earth"). Release of TVB's promotional poster for the drama confirmed that the Chinese title was used in the mainland version, 風雲天地.

== Synopsis ==
Kwan Yeuk-nam (Liza Wang) is a legendary woman. After her husband committed suicide due to a business failure, she single-handedly raised her three sons to adulthood, also establishing her own business empire, Sun Hon Lik, in the process. Now ready to retire, she is prepared to pass down her empire to her three sons.

Eldest son Cho Chi-wang (Kenny Wong) is quietly pursuing Nam's adoptive daughter, Hau Yee (Tong Fei), but Yee is truly in love with Wang's younger brother, Cho Chi-yuen (Hawick Lau). When Yuen's girlfriend passes away, Yuen devotes his life and energy to his career, and Wang's position as heir to the empire is threatened. Song Chi-wah (Monica Mok), a new employee at Sun Hon Lik, seduces Wang and nearly tears his family apart. With her family and business at the brink of breaking down, Nam has no choice but to step up and formally pass down the business to Yuen.

Wah tells Wang that he is not the birth son of Nam. Disheartened at his family, the two team up to incarcerate Yuen. Just when Wang and Wah are about to overthrow Nam's reign, Yee returns just in time to save Yuen.

== Cast ==
=== Cho family ===
- Wayne Lai as Cho Wan-hon (曹雲漢)

The deceased husband of Nam, Cho Chi-wan's adopted father, Cho Chi-yuen and Cho-Chi-ko's father. In 1987 Yiu Dai-ming bankruptcy, jumped to his death.

- Liza Wang as Kwan Yeuk-nam (關若男)
  - Selena Li as young Kwan Yeuk-nam (年輕關若男)

Headstrong middle-aged business woman Kwan Yeuk-nam, the CEO of Hong Kong conglomerate, Sun Hon-lik，Cho Wan-hon's wife, Cho-Chi-wan and Cho-Hau-yee's adopted mother, Cho Chi-yuen and Cho Chi-ko's mother.

- Hawick Lau as Cho Chi-yuen (曹志遠)

Second and middle son of Cho Wan-hon and Kwan Yeuk-nam. Became mentally ill at episode 24. Marries Cho Hau-yee in episode 32.

- Edwin Siu as Cho Chi-ko (曹志高)

Third and youngest son of Cho Wan-hon and Kwan Yeuk-nam. Indirectly killed Tang Yiyi.

- Kenny Wong as Cho Chi-wan (曹志宏)

Eldest son of Cho Wan-hon and Kwan Yeuk-nam.

- Kimmy Tong as Audrey Cho Hau-yee (曹巧兒)

Kwan Yeuk-nam's adopted daughter. In love with her second adopted brother Cho Chi-yuen and finally in episode 32 marries Cho Chi-yuen.

- Zhao Xiaolu as Linda Kwong Shuk-han (鄺淑嫻)

Kwong Kwan-ho's daughter, Cho Chi-wan's first wife. Divorced.

- Natalie Meng as Yiu Lei-fa (姚麗花)

Yiu Dai-ming's daughter, Cho Chi-ko's wife, Cho Wan-hon and Kwan Yeuk-nam's third daughter-in-law.

=== Extended cast ===
- Angie Chiu as Mok Nga-man (莫雅文)

The British Queen's Counsel, Cho Hau-yee's master, Cho Chi-wan's mother.

- Monica Mok as Kimberly Song Chi-wah (宋子樺)

Cho Chi-wan's second wife. Caused the death of Yiu Dai-ming and Poong Siu-kei's father. Villain.

- Tiffany Tang as Tang Yiyi (唐一一)

Cho Chi-yuen's girlfriend, Tang Qiqi's sister, Poon Siu-kei's halfblooded older sister, died of the car accident in episode 7.

- Sun Xing and *Li Ang as Yiu Dai-ming (姚大明)

Yiu Li-fa's father, Cho Chi-ko's father in-law, Cho Wan-hon and Kwan Yuek-nam's natural enemy，after a good and parents of daughter in-law, the Cho family's enemy，after a good，and Song Chi-wah collusion, after the quarrel，indirectly killed Cho Wan-hon in 1987, died of the heart attack（be indirectly killed by Song Chi-wah）in episode 19.

- Sze Yu as Kwong Kwan-ho (鄺君豪)

Kwong Shuk-han's father, Cho Chi-wan's former father in-law.

- Michelle Hu as Suki Poon Siu-kei (潘笑琪)

poon yau's daughter, Tang Yiyi's halfblooded younger sister.

- Mou Fengbin as Hon Tung (韓東)

Song Chi-wah's ex-boyfriend. Main villain of the series.

- Ben Cheung as Ben Chow (小周)

Cho Chi-yuen's friend

- Tony Ho as To Kit (屠傑)

Cho Chi-yuen's friend

== Production ==
.Master of Destiny mainland China promotional poster

Principal photography began on 1 August 2013 in Tianjin, China and secondary filming started in Hong Kong. Principal production relocated to Beijing, China in early September, and finally to Hong Kong in mid-September. A press conference was held in Tianjin on 20 August.

== Casting ==
In August 2012, Wong announced that he was writing a 40-episode drama serial for TVB, and expressed his interest in casting Deanie Ip, Kenneth Ma, Hawick Lau, and his own managed artist, Kimmy Tong, in the lead roles. In March 2013, reports confirmed that Ma was cast, replacing a role that was originally intended for Bosco Wong.

In July 2013, it was reported that Liza Wang was cast as 'Kwan Yeuk-nam', the leading role in this TV drama. Edwin Siu was then cast to replace Ma, who left the cast due to scheduling conflicts. Natalie Meng was also cast. Wayne Lai, Selena Li, and Kate Tsui were confirmed to guest star in a few episodes.

In August 2013, it was announced that Angie Chiu had quietly joined the cast. Chiu and Wang's last major television drama together where both actors were cast in sizeable starring roles was 1978's The Heaven Sword and Dragon Sabre. They were both subsequently part of 1985's very concise 6-episode but celebrity-overflowed The Yang's Saga, where both were already very prominent at the time as they assumed more of a guest-starring role in the series. The pair had played goddesses instead of humans with only one scene each and no screen time together the entire time.

== Broadcast ==
| Network | Country | Airing Date | Timeslot |
|---|---|---|---|
| AHTV | China | 28 May 2015 | Sunday – Saturday 7:30 pm (2 episodes) |
| TVB Jade/Jade HD | Hong Kong | 22 June 2015 | Monday – Friday 8:30–9:30 pm |
| Astro on Demand | Malaysia | 22 June 2015 | Monday – Friday 8:30–9:15 pm |
| TVBJ | Australia | 25 June 2015 | Monday – Friday 7:15–8:15 pm |

== Viewership Ratings ==
Hong Kong TVB Jade ratings
| # | Timeslot (HKT) | Week | Episode(s) | Average points | Peaking points |
|---|---|---|---|---|---|
| 1 | Mon – Fri 20:30 | 22–26 June 2015 | 1–5 | 24 | 29 |
| 2 | Mon – Fri 20:30 | 29 June-3 July 2015 | 6–10 | 22 | 26 |
| 3 | Mon – Fri 20:30 | 6–10 July 2015 | 11–15 | 23 | – |
| 4 | Mon – Fri 20:30 | 13–17 July 2015 | 16–20 | 21 | – |
| 5 | Mon – Fri 20:30 | 20–24 July 2015 | 21–25 | 23 | – |
| 6 | Mon – Fri 20:30 | 27–31 July 2015 | 26–30 | 25 | – |
| 7 | Mon – Fri 20:30 | 2 Aug 2015 | 31–32 | 27 | 29 |
| Total average | | | | 23 | 29 |
