= Decoded (film) =

- Theatrical release poster
- Directed by: Chen Sicheng
- Screenplay by: Chen Sicheng; Christopher MacBride
- Based on: Decoded by Mai Jia
- Produced by: Chen Sicheng
- Starring: Liu Haoran; John Cusack; Chen Daoming; Daniel Wu
- Cinematography: Cao Yu
- Edited by: Tang Hongjia
- Music by: Lorne Balfe; Kevin Riepl
- Production companies: As One Productions; Beijing Happy Pictures
- Distributed by: China Media Capital
- Release date: August 3, 2024 (China)
- Running time: 156 minutes
- Country: China
- Languages: Mandarin; English
- Box office: US$47.2 million

Decoded (Chinese: 解密) is a 2024 Chinese period drama film directed, produced and co-written by Chen Sicheng, and starring Liu Haoran, John Cusack, Chen Daoming and Daniel Wu. The film is based on the novel of the same name by Mai Jia.

== Plot ==
Rong Jinzhen is discovered as a child by his distant relative, university professor Xiaolili (Daniel Wu), who adopts and nurtures him. After completing his academic studies, Jinzhen is recruited into the top-secret Unit 701, a government spy agency tasked with breaking enemy codes. He is first assigned to crack the "Purple Cipher", used by America to assist Taiwan, before being tasked with the even more complex "Black Cipher." Jinzhen keeps a dream journal to help him break complex ciphers, as symbols from his dreams help him think beyond conventional methods. His dreams increasingly overtake his waking life as he obsessively pursues the solution. The story follows his journey from a reclusive mathematical genius to a crucial government asset whose work helps shape China's Cold War intelligence capabilities.

The film is set in the war-torn 1940s and follows autistic math genius Rong Jinzhen with a past shrouded in myth who is forced to abandon his academic pursuits to become a code-breaker for a secret spy agency.

== Cast ==
- Liu Haoran as Rong Jinzhen
- John Cusack as Liseiwicz, a mathematician and Rong's university tutor
- Chen Daoming as Director Cheng, the chief of Bureau 701
- Daniel Wu as Xiaolili, the chancellor of Rong's university
- Faye Yu as Ye Xiaoning, Rong's mother
- Martin Wang as Vasily, an enforcer of Bureau 701
- Krystal Ren as Xiaomei, another member of Bureau 701
- Zhu Zhu as Mrs. Liseiwicz
- Yusi Chen as the daughter of Xiaolili
- Pan Yueming

== Production ==
Pre-production of Decoded began in 2018, with Chen Sicheng helming the project. The film is based on Mai Jia's novel of the same name, and is Chen's first project to be adapted from a literary work. Chen noted that he had wanted to produce a film about mathematics and cryptography for a long time, and planned to set Decoded up as a film series. The project was greenlit in July 2023, with Christopher MacBride announced as the screenwriter. Liu Haoran joined the cast in September 2023, followed by rumors of Tony Leung Chiu-wai and Tang Wei starring in October, though both of them denied those reports. Principal photography spanned 98 days and wrapped on 25 January 2024. The film was presented on the Hong Kong International Film and TV Market in March.

== Release ==
Decoded had its premiere on 16 June 2024 on Weibo Movie Night, and was theatrically released in China on 3 August.

== Reception ==
Carlos Aguilar of Variety considered Decoded as "China's answer" to Christopher Nolan's Oppenheimer (2023), but criticized it for offering a sanitized and overly patriotic narrative, featuring an "uncritical depiction of China's policies and war tactics", while simultaneously demonstrating an "explicit desire to entice American sensibilities" to appease an international audience. Tay Yek Keak of 8days also compared the film to Oppenheimer in his 3/5 stars review, describing it as a blend of A Beautiful Mind (2001) and The Imitation Game (2014), but criticized it for being "too ambitious, over-plotted, and overlong" with convoluted plotlines that attempt to merge nationalistic themes with Western cultural references, while still appreciating the film's human moments and Liu Haoran's performance.

Simon Abrams of RogerEbert.com gave the film 2/4 stars, describing it as a "conventional and hackneyed" spy thriller that suffers from a clichéd portrayal of a troubled mathematician and a "prevailing lack of charm and agency", rendering it "prodding" and failing to engage despite its ambitious premise. Ho Siu-bun of am730 emphasized the film's failure at the box office despite high expectations, calling it "underwhelming", and critiqued its ambitious yet convoluted storytelling that attempts to emulate Christopher Nolan's style, while also highlighting the implausibility of the film's political themes.

== Accolades ==
Year	Award	Category	Recipient(s)	Result	Ref.
2024	Weibo Awards	Anticipated Movie of the Year	—N/a	Won	
2024	Weibo Awards	Popular Filmmaker of the Year	Chen Sicheng	Won	
2024	Weibo Awards	Popular Filmmaker of the Year	Liu Haoran	Won	
2024	Weibo Awards	Technician of the Year	Ma Xiaoai	Won	
2024	2024 Tokyo International Film Festival - Golden Crane Awards	Best Actor	Liu Haoran	Won	
2025	20th Changchun Film Festival - Golden Deer Awards	Best Actor	Liu Haoran	Won	
2025	38th Golden Rooster Awards	Best Actor	Liu Haoran	Nominated	
2025	38th Golden Rooster Awards	Best Cinematography	Cao Yu	Nominated	
2025	38th Golden Rooster Awards	Best Art Direction	Han Zhong and Ma Xiaofei	Won	
