= Yuanyuan =

Yuanyuan (Chinese: 圓圓/圆圆/媛媛/元元/园元) is a Chinese given name. Notable people with the given name include:

- Gao Yuanyuan (born 1979), Chinese actress
- Chen Yuanyuan (1624–1681), Chinese historical figure
- Kui Yuanyuan (born 1981), Chinese gymnast
- Yuanyuan Tan (born 1976), Chinese ballet dancer
- Xu Yuanyuan (born 1981), Chinese chess player
- Wang Yuanyuan (wrestler) (born 1977), male wrestler from China
- Wang Yuanyuan (volleyball) (born 1997), female volleyball player from China
- Zhang Yuanyuan (ambassador), Chinese ambassador to New Zealand
- The Chinese given name of figure skater Caroline Zhang (born 1993)

== See also ==
- Yuan Yuan (disambiguation)
