= Decoded (Chinese TV series) =

Chinese television series

- Drama poster
- Genre: Spy; Thriller
- Based on: Decoded by Mai Jia
- Written by: Feng Ji
- Directed by: An Jian
- Starring: Cheney Chen; Ying Er; Jing Chao; Zhang Zhehan; Ady An
- Opening theme: A Ray of Hope (微芒) by Cao Yang
- Country of origin: China
- Original language: Mandarin
- No. of episodes: 41

Production
- Executive producers: Luo Junhui; Xie Qi
- Production location: China
- Running time: 45 minutes
- Production companies: Zhejiang Huace Film & TV; Ningbo Radio & Television Group

Original release
- Network: Hunan TV
- Release: June 20 – July 16, 2016

Decoded (Chinese: 解密; pinyin: Jiěmì) is a 2016 Chinese television series based on the novel of the same name by Mai Jia. Directed by An Jian, it stars Cheney Chen, Ying Er, Jing Chao, Zhang Zhehan and Ady An. It was aired on Hunan TV from 20 June to 16 July 2016.

The series topped ratings chart and had over 6 billion views online during its domestic broadcast, but received mixed critical reviews. It was later aired via GetTV in the United States.

== Synopsis ==
During the early days of New China, Country X (a euphemism for the United States) sends out a special operations team to infiltrate China; using the "code purple" to communicate with each other. A top-secret Chinese intelligence agency named Unit 701 was formed, whose sole purpose is devoted to cryptography. Rong Jinzhen, an autistic math genius was recruited into Unit 701. There, he cracks the code purple, without knowing it was invented by his former teacher and best friend, who is actually a military intelligence analyst for Country X. However, this is only the first of many betrayals that follow, and slowly Jinzhen unravels the secrets behind his mysterious past.

== Cast ==
=== Unit 701 ===
- Cheney Chen as Rong Jinzhen

An autistic genius who is timid and lacks confidence, but later grows to become a capable agent. He is good friends with Zhao Qirong.

- Ying Er as Zhai Li

A girl with photographic memory, who is a revolutionary activist since young. She joined 701 for the sake of her long-time crush An Neng. She was initially jealous of An Neng's care toward Rong Jinzhen, but later falls in love with him.

- Zhang Zhehan as Han Bing

A skilled sharpshooter. He joined 701 to avenge his father, who died during a mission. He appears cold but is warm-hearted and loyal to his friends.

- Jing Chao as Zhao Qirong

Having been born and raised in difficult circumstances, Qirong is resilient. Because of his outstanding performance in fitness, he was recruited into 701. He is good friends with Rong Jinzhen.

- Guo Jingfei as Zheng Dang

Chief of the Encryption Team. He becomes crippled after getting injured during a war. A wise man who leads his juniors in completing their tasks.

- Yin Xiaotian as An Neng

Vice-Chief of the Operations Team who helps train new recruits. He sees Rong Jinzhen's strengths and goes the extra mile to take care of him.

- Bai Qinglin as Lei Ting

Leader of the Operations Team and the Head Instructor of the Training Camp. A highly capable and skilled agent. She initially looks down on Rong Jinzhen but grew to admire him. She has a crush on Zheng Dang.

- Yu Heng as Meng Xiaoyun

Possessing extraordinary hearing abilities, he was brought into 701 by Lei Ting. He hides his low self esteem behind a glib tongue. He is suspected of being a traitor/spy due to his father's job as a foreign investor.

- Yang Yi as Yan Shi

Daughter of a famous opera singer. Like Rong Jinzhen, she is a mathematical genius and works alongside him to break the code. She likes Pan Shen.

- Wang Yanyang as Pan Shen

A guy who possesses extraordinary investigative abilities. Pan Shen later comes under the control of the enemies, and develops schizophrenia. He likes Yan Shi.

- Wang Tonghui as Liu Yiping

A hero who broke WWII Japanese ciphers, but now turned into a helpless, chess-playing lunatic.

- Yu Bo as Lu Run

Chief of the Intelligence Office. He loves Lei Ting.

- Liu Tao as Gao Tie

Chief of the Research Team.

- Yuan Yuan as Wang Dazao

=== The Awakened ===
- He Qiang as Liseiwicz

A genius encrypter who turned to the enemies' side due to his desire for power. As he used to be Rong Jinzhen's teacher, he understands him well and tries to prevent him from breaking the code.

- Li Nan as Chen Jiangnian

Boss of Rui Xiang Hostel. He was the murderer who killed Han Bing's mother.

- Sun Xiaoxiao as Ying Yan
- Zhang Lingfeng as Qian Peng
- Zhang Yongqiang as Liang Hong

=== Others ===
- Ady An as Chen Yu

The lady boss of a fishing shop. She has a deep and memorable love with Rong Jinzhen, and often helps him get out of prickly situations.

- Gao Ming as Principle / Rong Jinzhen's adoptive grand uncle
- Liu Jie as Principle's wife
- Xu Xiaosa as Rong Yinyi

== Ratings ==
- Highest ratings are marked in red, lowest ratings are marked in blue

Air date	Episode	CSM52 City Network			CSM National Network		
Air date	Episode	Ratings (%)	Audience share (%)	Rank	Ratings(%)	Audience share (%)	Rank
2016.6.20	1-2	0.953	2.948	3	1.2	4.16	1
2016.6.21	3-4	0.9	2.799	3	1.21	4.24	1
2016.6.22	5-6	1.055	3.258	3	1.42	5.06	1
2016.6.23	7-8	1.254	3.871	1	1.57	5.41	1
2016.6.24	9	1.009	3.294	1	1.2	4.63	1
2016.6.25	10	1.192	4.007	1	1.3	5.17	1
2016.6.26	11-12	1.474	4.412	1	1.91	6.44	1
2016.6.27	13-14	1.52	4.556	1	1.8	6.17	1
2016.6.28	15-16	1.65	4.984	1	2.04	6.92	1
2016.6.29	17-18	1.949	6.059	1	2.31	7.97	1
2016.6.30	19	1.232	4.011	1	1.53	5.54	1
2016.7.01	20	1.399	4.671	1	1.67	6.52	1
2016.7.02	21	1.458	4.705	1	1.59	6.41	1
2016.7.03	22-23	1.347	4.392	1	1.57	6	1
2016.7.04	23-24	2.122	6.52	1	2.49	8.4	1
2016.7.05	25-26	2.179	6.649	1	2.38	7.98	1
2016.7.06	27-28	2.061	6.397	1	2.69	9.01	1
2016.7.07	29-30	2.094	6.44	1	2.51	8.6	1
2016.7.08	31	1.266	4.461	1	1.56	6.62	1
2016.7.09	32	1.406	4.774	1	1.73	7.35	1
2016.7.10	33-34	1.885	5.71	1	2.22	7.65	1
2016.7.11	35-36	2.099	6.365	1	2.34	7.71	1
2016.7.12	37-38	2.065	6.181	1	2.15	7.13	1
2016.7.13	39-40	2.302	6.966	1	2.43	7.9	1
2016.7.14	41-42	2.237	6.729	1	2.61	8.16	1
2016.7.15	43	1.282	4.174	1	1.49	5.75	1
2016.7.16	44	1.411	4.82	1	1.51	6.62	1

== Awards ==
Year	Award	Category	Winner	Ref.
2016	12th Chinese American Film Festival	Golden Angel Award for Outstanding Television Series	Decoded	
2016	12th Chinese American Film Festival	Golden Angel Award for Best Chinese Director	An Jian	
2016	8th China TV Drama Awards	Top Ten Television Series	Decoded	
2016	8th China TV Drama Awards	Best Acting Performance Award	Cheney Chen, Ying Er	
2017	11th National Top-Notch Television Production Award Ceremony	Outstanding Television Series	Decoded	
