= The Secret Society – Boss =

2003 Hong Kong film by Lam Wai Yin

The Secret Society - Boss
- Traditional Chinese: 江湖篇之大佬
- Simplified Chinese: 江湖篇之大佬
- Hanyu Pinyin: Jiāng Hú Piān zhī Dà Lǎo
- Jyutping: Gong1 Wu4 Pin1 Zi1 Daai6 Lou2
- Directed by: Lam Wai Yin
- Written by: Jameson Lam
- Produced by: Shing Chiu Kei
- Starring: Michael Tse; Jason Chu; Frankie Ng; Kara Hui; Raymond Cho; Lee Siu-kei
- Cinematography: Suen Siu Tung
- Edited by: Jacky Leung
- Music by: Mak Chun Hung
- Production company: B&S Limited
- Distributed by: B&S Films Distribution Company Limited
- Release date: 27 March 2003
- Country: Hong Kong
- Language: Cantonese

The Secret Society – Boss is a 2003 Hong Kong crime drama film starring Michael Tse. It was a low-budget film shot on digital video. It was followed by a sequel, The Secret Society: The Best Hack, which was released on 10 April 2003, 14 days after this film's release.

== Plot ==
Fai is the leader of the Hung Hing gang. He is a furious, violent, and prurient man, and his wife can't stand him, so she left him. Fai lives with his only daughter, Wing Kei, whom he cherishes and loves very much. One time Fai lewds a drugged girl in the disco. Later, he finds out she is the daughter of Lam Hiu Tung, the leader of the Yee Hing Gang. Tung requests Fai's compensation, but Fai denies it. When the two gangs prepare for a war, anti-triad division officer Lee comes in their way, and Tung leaves with anger. Tung's man, Chiu Chi Lung, gives him a plan to use Chi Wah, a famous gigolo, to chase and seduce Fai's daughter as revenge on Fai. Wing Kei and Chi Wah start to fall in love quickly, but Fai opposes their love, so Kei goes to her mom for help. Fai's man threatens Chi Wah to leave Wing Kei. Kei hates her father after she knows it and decides to leave home and marry Chi Wah. Kei goes to the usurer as a guarantor for Wah. She gives her virginity to him too. After that, Chi Wah exposes his actual face as a gigolo, and Kei is hurt badly. Fai is very angry and finds out Wah is the man of Yee Hing Gang Lam Hiu Tung. So, Fai starts a night attack on Tung, swearing to kill all his gang.

== Cast ==
Cast	Role
Michael Tse	Officer Lee
Frankie Ng	Ho Yiu Fai (Tricky Fai)
Jenny Yam	Ho Wing Kei
Jason Chu	Chiu Chi Lung
Lee Siu-kei	Lam Hiu Tung (Chubby Tung)
Raymond Cho	Hui Chi Wah
Kara Hui	Fai's ex-wife
Chan Chi Fai	Brother Nine
Anna Ng	Hung's mom
Bobby Yip	Drunkard at Fai's disco
Anita Chan	Mabel
Ann Ho	Lam Yan Yan
Jameson Lam	James
Chow Mei Shing	Keung
To Tai Wai	So Wai Hung
Benny Law	

== See also ==
- Hong Kong films of 2003
