= 衝上雲霄 =

衝上雲霄 or 冲上云霄 may refer to:

- Triumph in the Skies, Hong Kong drama television series that premiered on TVB
- Triumph in the Skies (film), Chinese romantic drama film
- Flying Man (2015 Chinese television show) (冲上云霄) : Chinese Liaoning Television show that premiered July 2015

== See also ==
- The dictionary definition of 衝 at Wiktionary
- The dictionary definition of 上 at Wiktionary
- The dictionary definition of 雲霄 at Wiktionary
