= Amber Kuo =

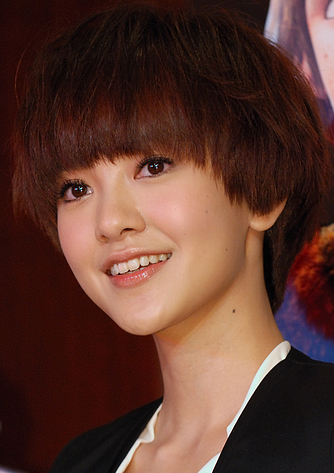
- Kuo in 2010
- Born: Kuo Tsai-chieh (郭采潔); 19 February 1986 (age 40); Taipei, Taiwan
- Other name: Amber Kuo
- Education: National Taipei University
- Occupations: Actress; singer
- Years active: 2007–present
- Awards: 12th Taipei Film Festival 2010; Best New Talent for Au Revoir Taipei

Chinese name
- Traditional Chinese: 郭采潔
- Simplified Chinese: 郭采洁
Transcriptions
Standard Mandarin
- Hanyu Pinyin: Guō Cǎijié
- Musical career
- Also known as: Guo Cai-jie
- Genres: Mandopop
- Instruments: Piano; Guitar
- Label: Warner Music Taiwan (2007–present)
- Member of: Mola Oddity

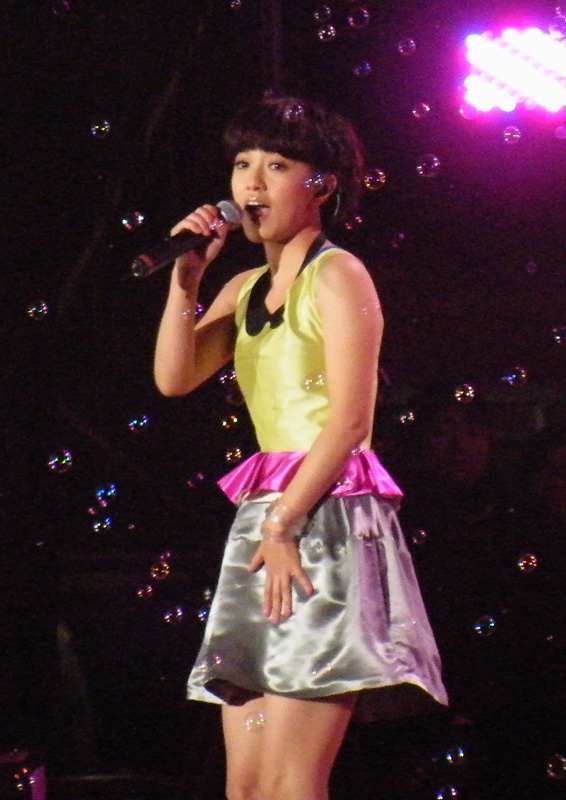
Kuo in 2011

Kuo Tsai-chieh (Chinese: 郭采潔; pinyin: Guō Cǎijié; Pe̍h-ōe-jī: Koeh Chhái-kiat, born 19 February 1986), also known as Amber Kuo, is a Taiwanese singer and actress.

== Career ==
Kuo made her debut in the music video of "我們小時候" (When We Were Young) by Taiwanese singer Tank. She was also featured in Stefanie Sun's music video of "雨天" (Rainy day) and F.I.R's music video "其實還愛你". She was featured in the song "This Is Love (就是愛)" on Nicholas Teo's album The Moment Of Silence (沉默的瞬間).

Kuo has also released five solo Mandarin solo albums.

She was nominated in 2010 for Best Actress at the 45th Golden Bell Awards for her role in The Happy Times of That Year. She was awarded Best New Talent at the 12th Taipei Film Festival in 2010 for her role in Au Revoir Taipei.

Kuo is also known for her role in the Tiny Times film series.

== Personal life ==
Kuo graduated from National Taipei University with a bachelor's degree in social work in 2008.

Kuo is a self-professed Christian and was baptised at Taipei Truth Lutheran Church on 31 May 2013.

== Filmography ==
=== Film ===
Year	English title	Original title	Role	Notes
2010	Au Revoir Taipei	一頁台北	Susie	
2010	Close to You	近在咫尺	Ting Hsiao-kuei	
2010	How to Train Your Dragon	—N/a	Astrid Hofferson	Taiwanese version, voice
2012	Love	愛	Lu Hsiao-ni	
2012	When Yesterday Comes	昨日的記憶	Xiaojie	segment "Power On"
2013	David Loman	大尾鱸鰻	Hsiao Chin	
2013	Tiny Times	小時代	Gu Li	
2013	Tiny Times 2	小時代：青木時代	Gu Li	
2013	Amazing	神奇	Venus	
2013	Love Speaks	意外的戀愛時光	Wang Leqing	
2014	Tiny Times 3	小時代：刺金時代	Gu Li	
2014	(Sex) Appeal	寒蟬效應	Pai Hui-hua	
2015	Crazy New Year's Eve	一路驚喜	Jia Yi	
2015	Triumph in the Skies	衝上雲霄	Kika Sit	
2015	Where the Wind Settles	風中家族	Qiu Mei	
2015	Tiny Times 4	小時代：靈魂盡頭	Gu Li	
2015	Jian Bing Man	煎餅俠	Da Peng's wife	
2015	Paris Holiday	巴黎假期	Ding Xiaomin	
2015	Ex-Files 2	前任2：備胎反擊戰	Yi Ze	
2015	Keeper of Darkness	陀地驅魔人	Jiang Xue	
2016	David Loman 2	大尾鱸鰻2	Hsiao Chin	
2016	L.O.R.D: Legend of Ravaging Dynasties	爵跡	Thalia	
2016	Sky On Fire	沖天火	Xiaozhen	
2017	The One	絕世高手	Xiao Man	
2017	Lord of Shanghai	上海王	Lily	
2019	Always Miss You	時間差		
2019	L.O.R.D: Legend of Ravaging Dynasties 2	爵跡2：冷血狂宴	Thalia	
2019	Xibao	喜寶	Jiang Xibao	
2021	Good Night Beijing	曾经相爱的我们	Meng Jie	
2021	Memory Dissection	记忆切割	Zhang Xiner	

=== Television series ===
Year	English title	Original title	Role
2007	Real's Music & Love Story	阿沁音樂愛情故事	Herself
2008	Invincible Shan Bao Mei	無敵珊寶妹	Hu Shanbao
2009	The Happy Times of That Year	那一年的幸福時光	Chen Suxin
2010	Channel X	國民英雄	Hong Xiaolu / Hong Meiling
2012	Love Forward	向前走向愛走	Meng Jingjing
2018	Great Expectations	遠大前程	Yu Mengzhu
2018	Kiss Love and Taste	親愛的味道	Jin Jinjin
2018	Meteor Garden	流星花园	Herself

=== Music video appearances ===
Year	Artist	Song title
2006	Stefanie Sun	"Rainy Day"
2006	Stefanie Sun	"Dream of the Sky"
2006	Tank	"When We Were Young"
2006	Real	"Deep Down Still in Love With You"
2006	Ho Yeow Sun	"Still Thinking About Him"
2008	Yeh Nai-wen	"Hot Milk"
2009	Nicholas Teo	"This Is Love"
2010	Magic Power	"Exclusive Magic"
2012	Lala Hsu	"Not That Hard"
2015	Kenji Wu	"No Pain No Love"

== Discography ==
=== Studio albums ===
Title	Album details	Track listing
Invisible Superman 隱形超人	Released: 25 December 2007; Label: Warner Music Taiwan; Formats: CD, digital download	Track listing: 1. I Remember; 2. I Need You; 3. Shopping 明天; 4. 快一點; 5. 隱形超人; 6. 誠實地想你; 7. 欠踹的背影; 8. 我的未來式; 9. 走路飛行; 10. 愛情定格
I Amber 愛異想	Released: 1 May 2009; Label: Warner Music Taiwan; Formats: CD, digital download	Track listing: 1. 又圓了的月亮; 2. Love & Love; 3. 天生一對; 4. 你在，不在; 5. 愛異想; 6. Sorry對不起; 7. 愛計較; 8. Didadi的愛; 9. 狠狠哭; 10. Rain Won't Stay
Sparklers 煙火	Released: 9 June 2010; Label: Warner Music Taiwan; Formats: CD, digital download	Track listing: 1. 煙火; 2. 不過問; 3. 怪怪牌; 4. 愛不愛; 5. 原諒; 6. 派樂地; 7. 卡通人生; 8. Little Sunshine; 9. 用微笑帶過; 10. 不說再見; 11. 我如果遇見我
Hear, There and Everywhere 給他	Released: 10 August 2012; Label: Warner Music Taiwan; Formats: CD, digital download	Track listing: 1. 給他; 2. 灌溉愛; 3. 最好的天氣; 4. 該忘了; 5. 爆炸的沉默; 6. 小狐狸; 7. 超完美的地獄; 8. 單曲循環; 9. 還愛著你; 10. 都是你
Begin Again 愛造飛雞	Released: 25 December 2015; Label: Warner Music Taiwan; Formats: CD, digital download	Track listing: 1. 單飛; 2. How Can I Tell You; 3. 分分鐘需要你; 4. 外面; 5. 船碇; 6. 愛人呢; 7. Wish You Were Here; 8. 沒有以後; 9. Last Smile; 10. Letter Read; 11. Always in Love feat. 阿拉鳥 （Lala Hsu、季欣霈）; 12. Bird n'Tree
Vol.13-1986 Vol.13-1986數羊	Released: 09 July 2021; Label: Nomad City Records; Formats: digital download	Track listing: 1. 我有一颗苹果Hide-and-Go-Seek; 2. If You Love My Soul; 3. Never Let Me Go; 4. 数羊 Counting Sheep; 5. 丢丢铜仔 DiuDiu Tong Zi; 6. 别派一群兔子猎杀一只狐狸 A Scarlet Riding Hood; 7. NaKuNa; 8. 昨天的月亮是圆的 Full Moon; 9. Buuve; 10. Etude练习曲

=== Soundtrack albums ===
Title	Album details	Track listing
Woody Sambo OST 無敵珊寶妹電視原聲帶	Released: 5 September 2008; Label: Warner Music Taiwan; Formats: CD, digital download	Track listing: 1. L.O.V.E; 2. 笨的可以; 3. 誠實地想你; 4. L.O.V.E （全民happy對唱版）
Taipei Swings! 一頁台北電影原聲大碟	Released: 26 March 2010; Label: Warner Music Taiwan; Formats: CD, digital download	Track listing: 1. Au Revoir Taipei (vocal version)

== Awards and nominations ==
Year	Award	Category	Nominated work	Result
2010	12th Taipei Film Festival	Best New Talent	Au Revoir Taipei	Won
2010	45th Golden Bell Awards	Best Actress	The Year of Happiness and Love	Nominated
2012	14th Taipei Film Festival	Best Supporting Actress	Love	Won
2012	49th Golden Horse Awards	Best Supporting Actress	Love	Nominated
2013	13th Chinese Film Media Awards	Best Supporting Actress	Love	Nominated
