= Sleek Rat, the Challenger =

2013 Chinese TV series

- poster
- Also known as: Bai Yutang
- 白玉堂之局外局
- Genre: Wuxia; Mystery
- Based on: The New Legend of Bai Yutang by Tan Ge
- Written by: Zhu Shaobin; Li Luke
- Directed by: Niu Niu
- Presented by: Li Chaoyang; Chen Jing; Chen Fei
- Starring: Xu Honghao
- Ending theme: "Song of the Knight-Errant" (侠客吟) by Huang Qiwen
- Composer: Yang He
- Country of origin: China
- Original language: Mandarin
- No. of episodes: 26

Production
- Executive producers: Cai Chuandao; Wang Xiaohu; Zhu Hao
- Producer: Ji Daoqing
- Cinematography: Sun Junchao
- Running time: ≈45 minutes per episode

Sleek Rat, the Challenger (白玉堂之局外局) is a 2013 Chinese wuxia-mystery television series based on the 2006 novel The New Legend of Bai Yutang (新白玉堂传奇) by Tan Ge (谈歌), starring Xu Honghao as "Sleek Rat" Bai Yutang, a knight-errant in 11th-century China. Many characters come from either the 19th-century novel The Seven Heroes and Five Gallants or the Generals of the Yang Family legends, but the story is completely new.

The series was first broadcast in Malaysia on TVBS-Asia on January 30, 2013, and in Taiwan on March 3, 2013.

== Cast ==
- Xu Honghao as Bai Yutang
- Zhang Xuan as He Ting
- Zhang Pengpeng as Cao Sunü
- Liu Xiaojie as Xiaohong
- Jordan Chan as Wei Shuaixian
- Siqin Gaowa as Mu Guiying
- Bao Guo'an as Bao Zheng
- Ni Dahong as Chen Zhen
- Hou Yong as Song Quan
- Yuan Yuan as Sima Ying
- Wang Jingsong as Gongsun Ce
- Fu Chengpeng as Zhan Zhao
- Shang Daqing as Lu Fang
- Zhang Shuping as Han Zhang
- Yang Dapeng as Xu Qing
- Jin Yang as Jiang Ping
- He Qiang as Yang Zongbao
- Luo Guangxing as Meng Liang
- Xiao Guoguang as Jiao Zan
