= Yuan Yuan (actor) =

Chinese actor, director and producer (born 1953)

- Born: Yuan Chengyi (袁承义); December 1953 (age 71); Beijing, China
- Occupation(s): Actor, director, producer
- Years active: 1978–present
- Spouse: Wu Jiahong (吴佳鸿) (m. 1985)

Yuan Yuan (Chinese: 袁苑; born Yuan Chengyi in December 1953) is a Chinese actor, director and producer.

== Early life ==
Yuan Yuan was born in Beijing in December 1953. When he was 16 years old, he joined the military. After serving for three years, he underwent demobilization and returned to Beijing, where he became an employee at car repair firm.

== Acting career ==
Yuan Yuan was a television and film star in the 1980s. He performed in over 100 roles. Sina Corporation said in 2000 that Yuan Yuan "has always played villains because of his unflattering appearance". He played Wang Dazao in the 2016 television series Decoded.

== Filmography ==
=== Film ===
Year	English title	Chinese title	Role	Notes
1978	Traveling Through the Storm	风雨里程	Gou Nao	
1979	Little Flower	小花	Zhang Chuan	
1979	Wedding	婚礼		
1980	Mystery of Goddess Peak	神女峰的迷雾	Tao Rongrong	
1981	Hidden Shadows	潜影	Xiao Ling	
1981	Huanhuan, Xiaoxiao	欢欢笑笑		
1982	Lawyer on Probation	见习律师	Zhao Dawei	
1982	Rickshaw Boy	駱駝祥子		
1983	Sunset Street	夕照街		
1983	Pigeon Guard in the Blue Sky	蓝天鸽哨		
1984	Two Girls	两个少女		
1985	The Young Woman and the Thief	少女与小偷		
1985	Desert Storm	瀚海潮	Han Xiaolong	
1985	Come On, Team China!	加油，中国队！		
1985	Toast, Women Soldiers	干杯，女兵们		
1986	Gun Shots from the Wasteland	荒岛枪声	Jiang Jieming	
1986	Last Sunshine	最后的太阳		
1986	Your Smile	你的微笑	Mai Ada	
1987	The Mahjong Set	翡翠麻将	Tang Xiaoliang	
1987	Fill the World with Love	让世界充满爱		
1987	Purple Red Crown	紫红色的皇冠	Zhan Liangliang	
1989	Having Nothing	一無所有		
1989	Yoshiko Kawashima	川島芳子	Ryūkichi Tanaka	
1989	Romance in a Metropolitan	都市情缘	Sha Lin	
1990	Unexpected Passion	遭遇激情	Liu He	
1991	Woman, Taxi, Woman	女人·TAXI·女人		
1992	The Prostitute and the Raftsman	悲烈排幫		
1992	The Impulse of Youth	青春冲动	Liu Peng	
1993	Intruders	闯入者	Zhao Chuan	
1993	Encounter in Shanghai	奪命驚魂上海灘	Yuan Afa	also producer
1993	Pursuers of Death	追逐死亡的人		
1994	A Time of Terror	惊恐时分		
1995	Big Victory	大捷	Fang Xianggong	
1996	The Emperor's Shadow	秦頌	Fan Wuji	
2000	Father	我是你爸爸		
2001	Dangerous Games	危险的游戏		
2002	Actually I'm not Stupid	其实俺不傻		
2003	The Law of Romance	警察有约		
2003	Be Blessed with Double Happiness	同喜同喜		
2004	Soliloquy of a Public Security Director	公安局长的独白		TV film
2004	Three of a Kind	煎釀三寶		
2005	The Lost Red Skirt	飘逝的红裙子		TV film
2006	Lethal Angels	魔鬼天使	Bowen	
2007	Shocking Thunder	震天鼓		
2007	The Elementary School that Disappeared	消失的小学		
2007	Legend of Twins Dragon	雙龍記		
2009	The Mates of Exorcising Dance	桔乡傩缘	Shi Shuiqing	TV film
2009	Meng Erdong	孟二冬	Fang Chao	
2009	Debt Love	欠债还情		
2010	A Love Story of Wugongshan	武功山别恋		
2010	A Risky Move	兵行险着		
2011	Beautiful Acne	美丽的青春痘		
2011	The Story of David	蛋炒饭		

=== TV dramas ===
Year	English title	Chinese title	Role	Notes
2003	The Heaven Sword and Dragon Saber	倚天屠龍記	Fan Yao	
2006	Royal Tramp	鹿鼎記	Hong Antong	
2010	Sleek Rat, the Challenger	白玉堂之局外局	Sima Ying	
2016	Decoded	解密	Wang Dazao	
