= Belinda Hamnett =

Hong Kong actor and model

- Born: 28 September 1975 (age 51); British Hong Kong
- Occupations: Actress; model
- Years active: 1997–2011

Chinese name
- Traditional Chinese: 韓君婷
- Simplified Chinese: 韩君婷
Transcriptions
Standard Mandarin
- Hanyu Pinyin: Hán Jūntíng

Belinda Hamnett (Chinese: 韓君婷; Cantonese: Hon Kwun-Ting) is a retired actress, model, and ex-beauty queen. Being crowned Miss Asia Pageant 1997 effectively launched her career in the fashion and entertainment industry. The model turned Hong Kong film actress lives in Singapore.

== Life and career ==
=== 1975–1996: Early days ===
Belinda Hamnett was born 28 September 1975 in Hong Kong but spent her childhood and teenage years in Singapore where her father was stationed. Hamnett resided in Changi, eastern Singapore, where she was a student at Changkat Changi Secondary School. Hamnett attended Sunday school at St Hilda's Church in Ceylon Road.

=== 1997–1998: Beauty & modeling career ===
In 1997, Hamnett attended ATV's Miss Asia Pageant and won the title of Miss Asia. Originally, Belinda was the first runner-up and the crowned beauty queen was Janice Chu Yin-chun. However, after it was discovered that Chu hidden her marriage during the contest, the heads of ATV decided to pass the title to Hamnett. After winning, Belinda would begin her fashion and modeling career before becoming an actress.

=== 1999–2001: Entering film & ATV ===
In between modeling, Belinda made her film debut in Troublesome Night 6, a HK horror film in 1999. She would begin her television acting career with ATV in 2000, making her debut in My Date with a Vampire II. Her second and final role was Divine Retribution before moving over to ATV’s competitor, TVB.

=== 2002–2005:Joining & leaving TVB ===
Hamnett would join TVB in 2002 and act with the company for the next three years. During that time, she worked primarily in support roles, co-hosted in HK tourism videos, appearances in variety shows, and continued her limited film career. By 2005, Hamnett parted ways with TVB but continued work in filming. Her reasons for leaving TVB were never clarified. Certain sources say she officially left TVB in 2010, but her last known acting credit was 2005's My Family.

=== 2006–2010: Leaving the industry & retirement ===
After leaving TVB, Hamnett left the industry in 2006 but made a brief return in 2009. She retired again in a year to help her brother out with his electronic business. However, another source suggested she went to advance her career in medical cosmetology.

In 2006, Hamnett revealed that she has overcome anorexia with the help of medical practitioners. Hamnett commented, “Although my body has not reached the stage the doctors approve of, but I am already very pleased. I am very happy at the moment.”

By 2010, Hamnett's last film project was Hi, Fidelity and she left the entertainment industry. She returned to Singapore and resumed civilian life. She would work for a German pharmaceutical firm as a practice development executive after her second departure. Overall, Hamnett had a showbiz career that spanned for twelve years.

=== 2011–present: Work in the beauty industry & bankruptcy ===
In 2014, Hamnett slipped into the bathroom and damaged her nose. While she attempted to repair the injury through multiple surgeries, it didn't correct the damage. Wary of further procedures and the costly nature of facial reconstruction, she ceased treatment and left her nose permanently crooked. She made a brief return in 2015, with many netizens commenting about her crooked nose, many believing it was botched plastic surgery but she clarified it was due to an injury.

Between 2019–2021, Hamnett lived with TVB artist Frankie Choi. After Hamnett's mom died of cancer, she amassed a large amount of debt (S$34.5K) for covering her ailing mother's medical fees. Choi offered her a place to stay while she tries to relieve her debts. Her career in the beauty industry helped her make ends meet, but the pandemic put an end to it. Unable to get government aid, she decided to file for bankruptcy. Her filing played a role in ending her friendship with Choi and she moved out. Hamnett claimed the bankruptcy filing changed Frankie’s attitude and he pressured her to leave while Choi claimed she merely declared she's leaving due to financial instability.

Throughout this time, Hamnett maintained an active social media presence on Facebook. She created her personal vlog channel and frequently does cooking demos and commentaries on the Everyone is Crazy Show (大家真瘋Show).

== Filmography ==
Television

- Women on the Run (2005) (TVB Series) Chu Chu
- Healing Hands III (2005) (TVB Series) Martha
- My Family (2005) (TVB Series) Akubi
- To Catch the Uncatchable (2004) (TVB Series) Mary Sok
- Point of No Return (2003) (TVB Series) as Law Bik-kei
- Divine Retribution (2000) (ATV Series) ... Cheng Miu-miu
- My Date with a Vampire II (2000) (ATV Series) Si-nga

Film

- Troublesome Night 6 (2000)
- Dance of a Dream (2001)
- Women from Mars (2002) - Kwun-Ting Hon
- Love for All Seasons (2003) - Cat
- Diva - Ah Hey (2003)
- Bless the Child (2003)
- Men Suddenly in Black (2003) [cameo]
- The Princess of Temple Street (2003)
- Herbal Tea (2004) - Erotic Film Director
- Love Is a Many Stupid Thing (2004)
- Where Is Mama's Boy? (2005) - The big sister
