= The Princess of Temple Street =

2003 Hong Kong film by Ching Fung

- Traditional Chinese: 廟街公主
- Simplified Chinese: 庙街公主
- Hanyu Pinyin: Miào Jiē Gōng Zhǔ
- Jyutping: Miu6 Gaai1 Gung1 Zyu2
- Directed by: Ching Fung
- Written by: Herman Ng
- Produced by: Rocco Leung
- Starring: Michael Tse; Tiffany Lee; Belinda Hamnett; Law Kar-ying; Kingdom Yuen; Lee Fung
- Cinematography: Patrick Chim
- Edited by: Chow Wai Keung
- Music by: Carlton Chu
- Production company: Punch Pictures
- Release date: 15 December 2003
- Running time: 89 minutes
- Country: Hong Kong
- Language: Cantonese

The Princess of Temple Street is a 2003 Hong Kong romantic comedy film directed by Ching Fung and starring Michael Tse and Tiffany Lee. The film was later re-issued as Laughing Lovers (Chinese: 我愛 Laughing) after Tse's successful portrayal of "Laughing Gor" in the 2009 TVB series E.U..

== Plot ==
Ever since little, Wilford has been suffering from mysophobia. Even his longtime girlfriend Flan cannot stand him and dumped him. While he is feeling all sad, his friends bring him to Temple Street where steps in for the first time ever. There, he bumps into "The Princess of Temple Street" Sue. As Wilford spends time with Sue, his mysophobia goes away and also develops a relationship with her. Things were going on pretty well until Flan returns.

== Cast ==
- Michael Tse as Wilford
- Tiffany Lee as Sue
- Belinda Hamnett as Flan
- Law Kar-ying
- Kingdom Yuen as Kiu
- Lee Fung
