= Roy Wang =

Chinese musician (born 2000)

- 王源
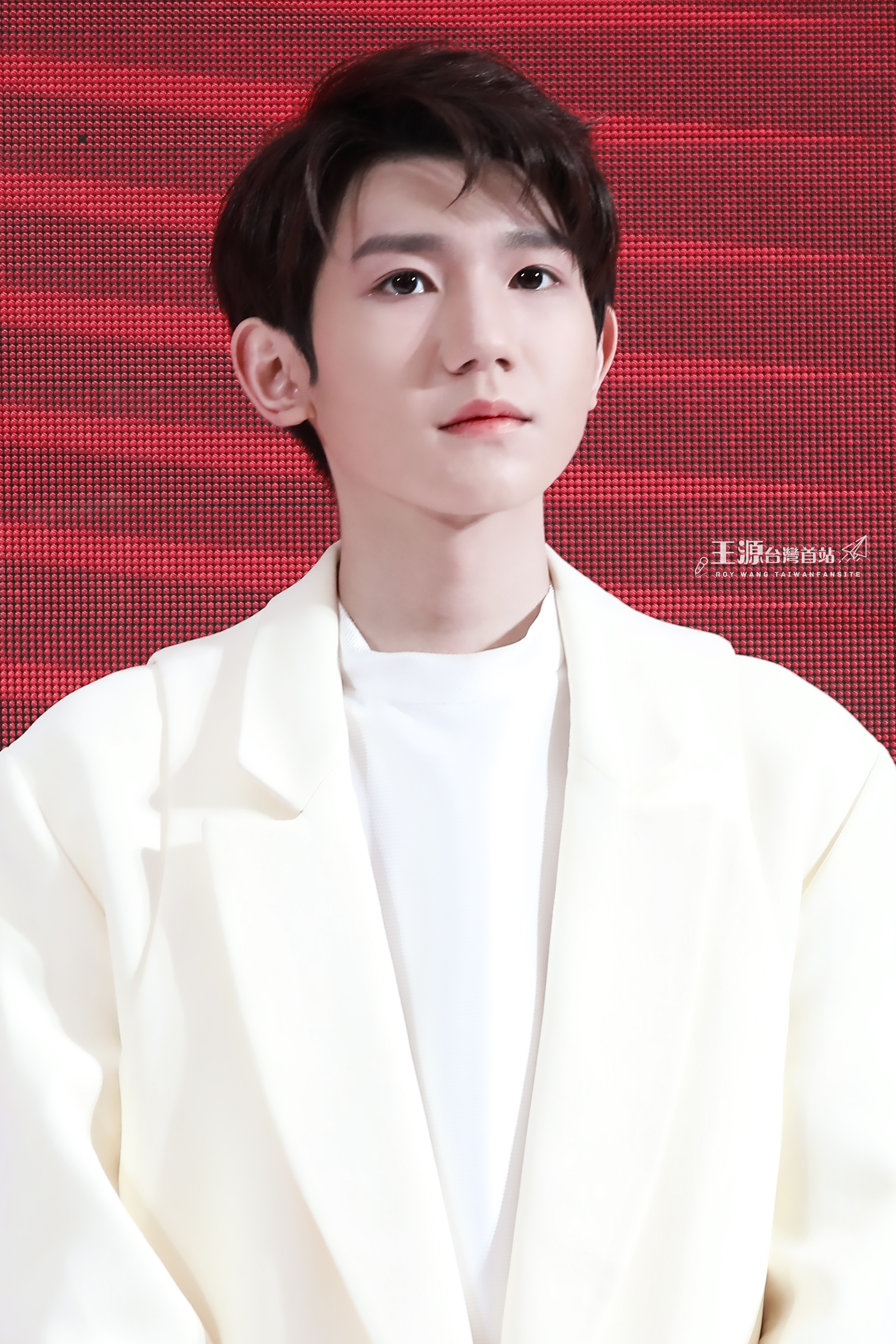
- Wang in December 2020
- Born: 8 November 2000 (age 25); Chongqing, China
- Education: Chongqing Nankai Secondary School
- Alma mater: Berklee College of Music
- Occupations: Singer-songwriter; actor; columnist
- Years active: 2013–present

Roy Wang, also known as Wang Yuan (Chinese: 王源; pinyin: Wáng Yuán) is a Chinese singer-songwriter, television host, actor, and member of boy band TFBoys. He was named by Time as one of the 30 Most Influential Teens of 2017. Wang has been a UNICEF ambassador since 2018.

== Career ==
At Wang's 15th birthday concert, he performed his first solo single "Cause of You", which was both written and composed by himself for his fans. The song was released in January 2016. Wang's post of this song on Sina Weibo has been re-posted for more than 471 million times. This song was also awarded Top 10 golden songs of Fresh Asia Charts, and Wang won the "Most Popular New Talent" award at the 9th CSC Music Awards for the song.

He released his second single which is written and composed by himself in October 2016, titled "The Best Time", as a gift to his alma mater for Chongqing Nankai Middle School 's 80th Anniversary.

In January 2017, Wang became an emcee for the second season of Zhejiang TV's prime time variety show, Ace vs Ace season 2. The show topped the TV ratings in China for the first quarter of the year and was viewed more than 5 billion times online.

In September 2017, Wang joined the cast of Dragon TV's variety show, Youth Inn.

In October 2017, Wang joined the indie film, So Long, My Son, directed by the leading Chinese auteur Wang Xiaoshuai.

On 24 October, Wang's self-written and composed single "Seventeen" was released for his 17th birthday. He released his first English single, titled "Sleep" on 6 November. On 20 November, Wang released another single titled "Pride", which is dedicated to his mother. In 2018, Wang was cast as the male lead in the xianxia drama The Great Ruler. The drama was on air in 2020.

Wang's first digital album titled "Song For You" was released on 22 January. The proceeds from the sale of the album go to Wang's charity foundation, Yuan Foundation. In February 2018, Wang returned to host Ace vs Ace season 3.

In May, Wang was invited to attend Cannes Film Festival as the ambassador of two famous brand L'Oréal and Chopard. He was the youngest Chinese artist to make an appearance at the Cannes. Wang partnered with Line Friends to create his own line of characters "ROY6". Merchandise based on the characters included apparel, toys, stationery and household items. In January 2019, Wang was accepted into the Berklee College of Music. In May 2021, Rolling Stone China launches with Zhang Chu and Wang on the cover. Wang's second album titled Summer Time was released on 15 December. It ranked first on TME Physical Album Sales Chart's December 2021 chart. On 24 December 2022, Wang's 3rd album titled Bedazzling was released. It ranked first on TME Physical Album Sales Chart's December 2022 chart. Wang's first concert, The Bedazzling Tour, began on 29 April 2023, in Shanghai, China.

== Social activities ==
On 18 May 2016, Wang was appointed as Chongqing Civilized Tourism's public welfare ambassador.

In December 2016, Wang worked with the UN China Youth group to promote the "Imagine 2030" campaign, which aims at encouraging the young generation in China. He was recognized for his contributions at the closing ceremony by receiving a special award.

Wang was one of the delegates representing China at the 6th United Nations Economic and Social Council (ECOSOC) youth forum, held in January 2017. He spoke at the event as the representative of the United Nations Imagine 2030 Campaign, calling for equal access to quality education worldwide.

For a consecutive second year, Wang represented China at the United Nations ECOSOC youth forum held in New York UN headquarters, in his role as UNICEF Special Advocate for Education.

=== Charity foundation ===
On 27 October 2017, Wang announced that he has set up his own charity foundation called Yuan Foundation and that the first initiative has been carried out to help elderly with cataract regain their sight. The second initiative was to raise funds for children with Neuroblastoma.

On 5 February 2018, he became a columnist for Global People, a comprehensive current affairs magazine sponsored by People's Daily. In addition, Wang opened an exclusive column each month known as "Wang Yuan Says". During the anniversary of the Yuan Foundation on 27 October, a breakdown of income and expenditure was released, including the income from Wang Yuan's album Song for You, the income from the Global People column, and the income from the live broadcast.

=== Yuan Foundation events ===
Year	Title	Results
2017	Performing surgery for cataract patients in high-altitude areas of Tibet	200 seniors get their sight back
2017	Dedicated funding for children with pediatric neuroblastoma	For the triplet children in Xinxiang, Henan Province, to bear the shortfall of 100,000 yuan in treatment costs, and even spend 40,000 yuan to rent a two-bedroom apartment for the family until the beginning of spring. Five cases have been completed
2018	Second trip to Tibet to help cataract patients	1,444 people were screened, 373 were diagnosed, 21 of whom were unable to undergo surgery for medical reasons, and 352 were finally operated on successfully
2020	Yuan Foundation Tibet Light Walk	A total of 900 sets of crystal consumables for subsequent cataract surgery were distributed. A total of 900 patients will be able to see again.
2021	Yuan Foundation Qinghai Light Walk	Fund 1 million per year for 3 years on a trial basis to supplement the cost of surgical treatment. To enable cataract patients to achieve a 100% reimbursement ratio of total inpatient treatment costs and zero out-of-pocket costs.

=== Ambassadorship ===
- In 2014, Wang and his teammates were hired by the China Population Welfare Foundation as ambassadors for the Happy Smile - Helping Children with Cleft Lips and Palates charity project. He is the Dream Ambassador of the Dream Project, a charity event organized by Mango V Foundation, together with members of the group.
- In 2016, Wang became the Chongqing Civilized Tourism Public Welfare Ambassador. On 10 October, he became the Mars Ambassador.
- In 2017, Wang served as Chongqing Civilized Tourism Public Welfare Ambassador, Campus Love Ambassador, and Campus Public Welfare Ambassador, as well as UNICEF Youth Education Ambassador.
- In 2018, Wang served as the Ice and Snow Sports Promotion Ambassador and Winter Olympics Ambassador of the 23rd Winter Olympics. He was named China Blue - Ace Public Welfare Ambassador. In November, he was appointed as UNICEF Ambassador and served as Wild Rescue GO blue to Blue Public Welfare Ambassador.
- On 20 November 2019, World Children's Day, a high-level meeting of the United Nations General Assembly was held at the UN headquarters in New York to celebrate World Children's Day and the 30th anniversary of the adoption of the Convention on the Rights of the Child, where UNICEF Ambassador Wang spoke to call attention to the fact that every child should have the right to education.

== Discography ==
=== Studio albums ===
- Summer Time (2021)
- Bedazzling (2022)

=== Extended plays ===
- Yuan (2019)
- The 400 Blows (2020)
- Dragonfly (2023)

=== Singles ===
- "Song for You" (2018)

== Filmography ==
=== Film ===
Year	Title	Role
2016	L.O.R.D: Legend of Ravaging Dynasties	Dusk
2019	So Long, My Son	Liu Xing
2020	My People, My Homeland	Professor Han
2021	1921	Deng Xiaoping
TBA	Burning Star	Li Yimin
TBA	The Boy Who Counted Cars	A Zhi
TBA	XXX4	

=== Television series ===
Year	Title	Role
2020	The Great Ruler	Mu Chen
2023	Ray of Light	Yuan Gao

=== Variety shows ===
Year	Title
2017	Ace vs Ace Season 2
2017	Youth Inn
2018	Ace vs Ace Season 3
2019	Haha Farmer
2019	I am a Singer-Songwriter 1
2020	Our Songs 2
2021	The Treasure
2021	Game Of Shark
2021	The Coming One 5
2023	Baichuan Variety shows

== Accolades ==
Year	Award	Category	Nominated work	Result	Ref.
2016	9th CSC Music Awards	Most Popular New Talent	"Cause of You"	Won	
2017	CCTV Global Chinese Music Awards	Best Singer-Songwriter of the Year	—N/a	Won	
2017	CCTV Global Chinese Music Awards	Song of the Year	"Seventeen"	Won	
2020	ERC Chinese Top Ten	Most Popular Male Singer	—N/a	Won	
2020	ERC Chinese Top Ten	Most Popular Concert	"2019 Roy Wang's YUAN Concert"	Won	
2020	ERC Chinese Top Ten	Top 10 Songs	"Blazing"	Won	
2021	China Music Billboard	Best New Artis	—N/a	Won	
2021	Douyin Star Motion Night	Most Popular Singer-Songwriter of the Year	—N/a	Won	
2022	ERC Chinese Top Ten	Most Popular Asian Pop Singer	—N/a	Won	
2022	ERC Chinese Top Ten	Best Album	"Summer time"	Won	
2022	ERC Chinese Top Ten	Top 10 Songs	"Fall for you"	Won	
2023	Tencent Music Entertainment Awards	Most Popular Album	Bedazzling	Won	
