= Decoded (novel) =

Novel by Mai Jia

- Author: Mai Jia
- Translator: Olivia Milburn, Christopher Payne (2014)
- Language: Chinese
- Publication place: China
- Media type: Print (Hardcover)

Decoded (解密) is a 2002 novel by Mai Jia. It tells the story of a brilliant Chinese mathematician recruited to work as a cryptographer for his country. It is set primarily in the period surrounding World War II and the continuing turmoil in China following the war. It is Mai Jia's first novel, as well as his first book to be translated into English.

The book was adapted into a 2016 TV series of the same name and into a 2024 film of the same name. In 2017, Jake Kerridge, writing in The Daily Telegraph, declared it to be one of "the 20 best spy novels of all time."

== Plot summary ==
Decoded tells the story of Rong Jinzhen, an orphaned genius. Rong is adopted by distant relatives who study mathematics at an unnamed Chinese university, and is soon recognized for his mathematical prowess. Rong comes under the wing of a visiting Polish professor named Liseiwicz, who recognizes Rong's brilliance and urges him to study artificial intelligence.

After Liseiwicz leaves China, Rong is approached by a government agent looking for the brightest students to bring into Unit 701, a government agency devoted to cryptography. At Unit 701, Rong cracks the nefarious Purple cipher, and soon becomes obsessed with cracking the Black cipher. After his notebook is stolen, however, Rong suffers a nervous breakdown from which he never recovers.

== Reception ==
The New York Times described Decoded as "a page turner" with "a gripping plot, otherworldly aura, and flamboyant detail." The Guardian wrote that Decoded is "deft in its exploration of the world of mathematics and of cryptography." It was also declared to be "a great Chinese novel" by The Economist. It was also positively received overall by the Financial Times and the South China Morning Post.

A more mixed review appeared in the London Review of Books, and The Telegraph gave it a relatively neutral review.

== See also ==
- Encryption
- Spy fiction
- Chinese literature
