= Grade One (TV series) =

Chinese television series

- Also known as: Yi Nian Ji
- Traditional Chinese: 一年級
- Simplified Chinese: 一年级
- Hanyu Pinyin: yī nián jí
- Genre: Variety show
- Starring: Chen Xuedong, Song Jia
- Country of origin: China
- Original language: Mandarin
- No. of seasons: 1
- No. of episodes: 11

Production
- Production location: China
- Running time: 90 minutes
- Production company: Hunan Broadcasting System

Original release
- Network: Hunan Broadcasting System (HBS)
- Release: 17 October – 26 December 2014

Related
- Grand One: Freshman (2015)

Grade One is a Chinese variety show produced by Hunan Broadcasting System. The reality show adopts a parent-child style of interaction was shot at "Xiangjun Future Experimental School". In the show, Chen Xuedong served as homeroom teacher while Xiao Song Jia served as a teacher. It was first aired on October 17, 2014, and was broadcast on every Friday.

== Summary ==
The theme decided by the production team was the "growth diary of a fresh newbie teacher". There were 7 elementary school students who participated the show, each from different family background. These seven students were on their day of elementary school, with previously transited from their respective pre-schools. Without their friends and parents, these students with only the two newbie teachers will have to independently spend the rest of the semester in the dormitory.

== Production ==
According to media reports, Hunan TV invested more than 100 million yuan of funds, but 80% of the funds are used in the equipment and post-editing. Cost for the cast were less than what netizens and the outside world expected.

Shooting of the program was conducted in a fully enclosed campus, and the producers installed 120 cameras in the filming area and 15 movie cameras. The scale of filming was far greater than that of "I Am a Singer" and "Where Are We Going? Dad" and other reality shows.

The reality show shared the same director and creator with "Super Girl" and "Super Boys", Xia Qing, the same producer with "X-Change", Xu Qing, and the same production team with "Divas Hit the Road".

== List of episodes ==
| Ep. | Date | Title | Guest |
|---|---|---|---|
| 1 | 2014-10-17 | Teachers enter the campus, Ma Haoxuan begins to be wanton | |
| 2 | 2014-10-24 | Li Hao Yu proposes to Bai Anqi | |
| 3 | 2014-10-31 | Quirky ways of confessing love to Apple from Simon & Li Haoyu | |
| 4 | 2014-11-07 | Class monitor chooses Hai Tao to cheer Wang Zixuan | |
| 5 | 2014-11-14 | Simon's clash between Eastern and Western values | |
| 6 | 2014-11-21 | Zhou Bichang's tantrums and eccentric outbursts | Bibi Zhou |
| 7 | 2014-11-28 | Meng Wa meets the strictest teacher in the universe | Wang Ruihua, Huang Lei |
| 8 | 2014-12-05 | Wang Han teaches fire prevention techniques | Wang Han, Ming Dao |
| 9 | 2014-12-12 | Guo Jingming's assistance, Chen Xuedong & Song Jia's sweet confession | Guo Jingming |
| 10 | 2014-1219 | Jiro Wang's torturous trip to the zoo, Dong Hua's opinion of Grade One | Jiro Wang |
| 11 | 2014-12-26 | Winter flower returns while Huajingyu & Guo Jingming repeats first grade | Guo Jingming, Ming Dao, Hua Chenyu, Du Haitao |
