= Ying Er =

Chinese actress (born 1988)

- Born: Liu Ying (刘颖); 12 December 1988 (age 37); Changde, Hunan, China
- Education: Central Academy of Drama
- Occupation: Actress
- Years active: 2007–present
- Agent(s): H&R Century Pictures
- Spouse: Fu Xinbo (m. 2017)
- Children: 1

Chinese name
- Traditional Chinese: 穎兒
- Simplified Chinese: 颖儿
Transcriptions
Standard Mandarin
- Hanyu Pinyin: Yǐng'ér

Real name
- Traditional Chinese: 劉穎
- Simplified Chinese: 刘颖
Transcriptions
Standard Mandarin
- Hanyu Pinyin: Liú Yǐng

Ying Er (Chinese: 颖儿, born 12 December 1988) is a Chinese actress. Her real name is Liu Ying (刘颖). She is best known for her roles in the television series Sealed with a Kiss, Xiao Ju's Spring Day, and Decoded.

== Filmography ==
=== Film ===
Year	English title	Chinese title	Role	Notes	Ref.
2007		牛筋儿	Xiao Baicai	Television film	
2008	A Love Story in Gannan	橙乡天使	Zhong Xiaomeng		
2008	KungFu Hip-Pop	精舞门	Ice cream girl	Cameo	
2009		盗版爱情	Wang Xiaoli		
2012	Crazy Stupid Thief	疯狂的蠢贼	Wang Shiyi		
2012	Love Transplantation	勇敢爱之爱情规划局	Wang Xingyu	Short film	
2013	Love Is Beautiful	爱，很美	Qian Xiaofei		
2013	A Chilling Cosplay	制服	Yan Xiaotong		
2014	Unexpected Love	谁说我们不会爱	Su Xiaoyuan		
2018	Kung Fu Monster	武林怪兽	Seductive swords woman	Cameo	

=== Television series ===
Year	English title	Chinese title	Role	Notes	Ref.
2009	Jade Phoenix	翡翠凤凰	Qin Xiaoyu		
2009	The Book and the Sword	书剑恩仇录	Princess Fragrance		
2010	Doomed Love	孽缘	Zhang Xiaodi		
2010	Strands of Love	丝丝心动	Lu Tian'er		
2011	Empresses in the Palace	后宫甄嬛传	Xia Dongchun		
2011	Sealed with a Kiss	千山暮雪	Tong Xue		
2012	Happy Michelin Kitchen	幸福三顆星	Zhou Jiaqi		
2012	Bounty Hunter	赏金猎人	Du Yuhan		
2012	Xiao Ju's Spring Day	小菊的春天	Liang Xiaoju		
2013	The Exquisite Trap	玲珑局	Lin Xiaoying		
2013	Painted Skin 2	画皮之真爱无悔	Princess Jing		
2013	Hero	英雄	Xi Shi		
2013	Marriage Itch	婚姻之痒	Zhuang Li		
2013	The Patriot Yue Fei	精忠岳飞	Jiangnan's beauty	Cameo	
2013	Best Time	最美的时光	Xu Qiu		
2014	The Joyfully Pretty Enemy	欢天喜地俏冤家	Lei Jidi		
2014	Wonderful Spring	美妙的奇遇情缘	Tan Miaomiao		
2015	Red Hunt 1949	红色追剿1949	Xu Lamei		
2015	The Lost Tomb	盗墓笔记	Huo Xiuxiu		
2015	Ice and Fire of Youth	冰与火的青春	Xia Bing		
2015	The Direction of Happiness	幸福的方向	Su Zitong		
2016	Decoded	解密	Cui Li		
2016	Hope Husband Success	望夫成龙	Qian Shunshun		
2016	True Color of Beauty	战火红颜	Fang Ziwei		
2017	My Ruby My Blood	一粒红尘	Ye Zhaojue		
2018	Swords of Legends 2	古剑奇谭2	Wen Renyu		
2018	Best Arrangement	最好的安排	Zhao Zihui		
2018	The Best Meeting	最好的遇見	Mao Yaya		
2019	Hello Joann 2	乔安你好	Joann Foray / Qiao An		
2021	Shuke and Peach Blossom	舒克与桃花	Tao Hua		
2021	The Sword and the Brocade	锦心似玉	Luo Yuanniang		
2021	Hand in Hand	陪你一起长大	Lin Yunyun		
2022	The Imperial Age	山河月明	Xu Miaoyun		
2022	The Power Source	麓山之歌	Fang Fei		
2022	Liberation of Shanghai	破晓东方	Yang Jianqing		
2023	Imperial Victim	不完美受害人	Mi Mang		
2023	Winter and Lion	冰雪尖刀连	Jing Qiu		
2023	The Last Immortal	神隐	Hong Ruo		
2024	Simple Days	小日子	Shen Liuliu		
2024	Deep Lurk	深潜	Wen Yeming		
2025	Six Sisters	六姊妹	He Jiayi		
2025	The Immortal Ascension	凡人修仙传	Ni Chang		
2025	Yin Feng	隐锋	Jia Yunying		
2025	The Miracles	奇迹	Wang Jiawen		
2026	Xiao Fang	小芳	Yang Fanmei		
TBA	Dream	醉梦	Zheng Xiaoqin		
TBA	5 Missing Teenagers	五个失踪的少年	Yan Chunyu		
TBA	Evidence	铁证	He Hongxia		

== Discography ==
Year	English title	Chinese title	Album	Notes
2008	"Pretty Boy"	漂亮男孩	Pretty Baobei OST	
2011	"Happiness to the End"	欢乐到底	—N/a	
2011	"Only You Will Understand"	非你不懂	Sealed with a Kiss OST	with Li Zhinan
2011	"Twilight Snowfall"	暮雪	Sealed with a Kiss OST	
2012	"Language of Flower"	花语	Xiao Ju's Spring Day OST	
2015	"Hello Spring"	青春你好	Ice and Fire of Youth OST	
2015	"Them"	他们	Ice and Fire of Youth OST	

== Awards and nominations ==
Year	Award	Category	Nominated work	Result	Ref.
2012	8th Huading Awards	Best New Actress	Xiao Ju's Spring Day	Won	
2019	Sina Fashion Awards	Quality Artist of the Year	—N/a	Won	
