= Mai Jia =

Chinese novelist

- 麦家
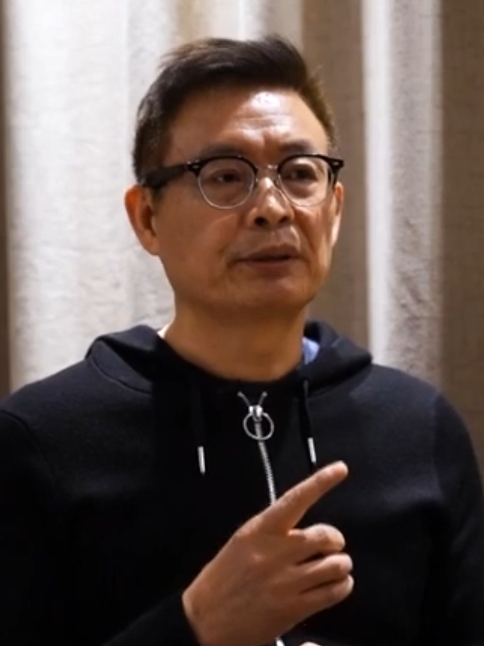
- Born: 1964 (age 61–62); Fuyang District, Hangzhou, Zhejiang, China
- Education: People's Liberation Army Foreign Language College; People's Liberation Army Arts College
- Occupation: Novelist
- Writing career
- Language: Chinese
- Period: 1986–present
- Genre: Novel
- Notable work: In the Dark
- Notable awards: 6th National Book Award; 2002 Decoded; 7th Mao Dun Literature Prize; 2008 In the Dark

Jiang Benhu (simplified Chinese: 蒋本浒; traditional Chinese: 蔣本滸; pinyin: Jiǎng Běnhǔ; born 1964), better known by his pen name Mai Jia (麦家), is a Chinese novelist. He also served as the president of Zhejiang Writers Association and vice president of the Zhejiang Literature and Art Association.

== Biography ==
Jiang was born in Fuyang District, Hangzhou, Zhejiang Province in 1964. He joined the People's Liberation Army and served for 17 years.

Jiang graduated from People's Liberation Army Foreign Language College in 1983, where he majored in wireless radio. He started to publish works in 1986. Jiang was accepted to People's Liberation Army Arts College in 1987 and graduated in 1991, majoring in literature.

In 1997, Jiang worked in Chengdu Satellite TV as an editor. In 2008, Jiang was transferred from Chengdu to Hangzhou.

In December 2010, Jiang was elected the vice president of the Zhejiang Literature and Art Association. On July 1, 2013, Jiang was elected the president of Zhejiang Writers Association.

== Works ==
=== Novellas ===
- Letting the Masked Man Speak (让蒙面人说话)

=== Novels ===
- Decoded (解密) (2002)
- In the Dark (暗算) (2003)
- The Message (风声) (2007)
- The Colonel and the Eunuch (人生海海) (2019)

=== Translated works ===
- Decoded, trans. Olivia Milburn and Christopher Payne (London: Allen Lane, 2014)
- In the Dark, trans. Olivia Milburn and Christopher Payne (London: Penguin, 2015)
- The Message, trans. Olivia Milburn (London: Head of Zeus, 2020)
- The Colonel and the Eunuch, trans. Dylan Levi King (London: Apollo, 2023)

== Awards ==
- Decoded - 6th National Book Award
- In the Dark - 7th Mao Dun Literature Prize

Cultural offices
Preceded by Cheng Weidong	President of Zhejiang Writers Association; 2013–2018	Succeeded by Zhu Xiongwei
