= Youth Film Handbook =

Chinese film magazine

Youth Film Handbook (青年电影手册) is a Chinese magazine established by film critic/screenwriter/director Cheng Qingsong (程青松) in 2007, featuring independent film reviews and interviews. It is best known for handing out its annual "Golden Broom Awards" (金扫帚奖), highlighting the most disappointing films of the year.

== Awards for Excellence in Chinese-language films ==
=== Top-10 Films ===
2009

- Cannot Live Without You
- Spring Fever
- 24 City
- The Clear Water
- Yang Yang
- Hear Me
- Vengeance
- Night and Fog
- Cow
- Crazy Racer

2010

- Let the Bullets Fly
- Buddha Mountain
- Monga
- Echoes of the Rainbow
- Chongqing Blues
- When Love Comes
- The Fourth Portrait
- Taipei Exchanges
- Love in a Puff
- Lost on Journey

2011

- A Simple Life
- Seediq Bale
- The Piano in a Factory
- Love for Life
- Folk Song Singing
- Mr. Tree
- Life Without Principle
- You Are the Apple of My Eye
- Eternal Watch
- Starry Starry Night

2012

- Mystery
- 11 Flowers
- People Mountain People Sea
- Feng Shui
- Lost in Thailand
- The Grandmaster
- Cold War
- Girlfriend, Boyfriend
- Touch of the Light
- Together

2013

- Stray Dogs
- A Touch of Sin
- Ilo Ilo
- China Affair
- All Apologies
- The Love Songs of Tiedan
- Don't Expect Praises
- Fly with the Crane
- Soul
- Rigor Mortis

2014

- Blind Massage
- Ice Poison
- Brotherhood of Blades
- Black Coal, Thin Ice
- Gone with the Bullets
- Paradise in Service
- Forgetting to Know You
- Exit
- Aberdeen
- The Midnight After

2015

- Red Amnesia
- Port of Call
- Mountains May Depart
- Thanatos, Drunk
- A Fool
- The Master
- I Am Somebody
- The Assassin
- River Road
- Zinnia Flower

2016

- Tharlo
- The Road to Mandalay
- Kaili Blues
- Mad World
- Mr. Donkey
- Crosscurrent
- Trivisa
- Godspeed

=== Individual awards ===
Year	Director of the Year	Male Actor of the Year	Actress of the Year	Best supporting actor	Best supporting actress
2011 (awarded in 2012)	Zhang Ming for Folk Songs Singing	Wang Baoqiang for Mr. Tree	Qin Hailu for The Piano in a Factory		
2012 (awarded in 2013)	Lou Ye for Mystery	Wang Baoqiang for Lost in Thailand	Yan Bingyan for Feng Shui; Hao Lei for Mystery		
2013 (awarded in 2014)	Jia Zhangke for A Touch of Sin; Tsai Ming-liang for Stray Dogs	Jiang Wu for A Touch of Sin	Zhao Tao for A Touch of Sin		
2014 (awarded in 2015)	Lou Ye for Blind Massage	Guo Xiaodong for Blind Massage	Tao Hong for Forgetting to Know You		
2015 (awarded in 2016)	Wang Xiaoshuai for Red Amnesia	Aaron Kwok for Port of Call	Zhao Tao for Mountains May Depart; Lü Zhong for Red Amnesia	Wang Qianyuan for Saving Mr. Wu	Jiang Wenli for The Master
2016 (awarded in 2017)	Pema Tseden for Tharlo	Kai Ko for The Road to Mandalay	Yang Shik Tso for Tharlo	Zhang Yi for Cock and Bull	Elaine Jin for Mad World

== Golden Broom Awards ==
=== Most Disappointing Films ===
2009

- A Simple Noodle Story
- City of Life and Death
- The Treasure Hunter

2010

- Confucius
- Just Call Me Nobody
- If You Are the One 2

2011

- The Warring States
- Legendary Amazons
- The Lost Bladesman

2012

- The Guillotines
- The Last Supper

2013

- Tiny Times & Tiny Times 2
- Switch
- Personal Tailor

2014

- The White Haired Witch of Lunar Kingdom
- Tiny Times 3
- The Breakup Guru

2015

- Oh My God
- Devil and Angel
- Forever Young

2016

- League of Gods
- From Vegas to Macau III
- See You Tomorrow

2017

- Buddies in India
- Once Upon a Time
- Pure Hearts: Into Chinese Showbiz

2018

- Love Apartment
- The Faces of My Gene
- Hello, Mrs. Money

2019

- Shanghai Fortress
- Jade Dynasty
- Always Miss You

2020

- The Story of Hay Bo (2020)
- Wild Grass
- Oversize Love

=== Individual awards ===
Year	Most Disappointing Directors	Most Disappointing Actors
2009; 1st (awarded in 2010)	Zhang Yimou for A Simple Noodle Story; Lu Chuan for City of Life and Death	Male actor: Xiaoshenyang for A Simple Noodle Story; Actress: Lin Chi-ling for The Treasure Hunter
2010; 2nd (awarded in 2011)	Feng Xiaogang for If You Are the One 2 Hu Mei for Confucius	Male actor: Zhou Libo for Flirting Scholar 2 & Adventure of the King; Actress: Barbie Shu for Future X-Cops, Reign of Assassins, Adventure of the King
2011; 3rd (awarded in 2012)	Gao Xiaosong for My Kingdom; Frankie Chan for Legendary Amazons	Male actor: Sun Honglei for The Warring States; Actress: Cecilia Cheung for Legendary Amazons & Treasure Hunt
2012; 4th (awarded in 2013)	Joe Ma for The Lion Roars 2 Lu Chuan for The Last Supper	Male actor: Xiaoshenyang (2nd win) for The Lion Roars 2 Actress: Yang Mi for Holding Love & Wu Dang
2013; 5th (awarded in 2014)	Guo Jingming for Tiny Times & Tiny Times 2 Jay Sun for Switch	Male actor: Du Haitao for Bring Happiness Home & Dating Fever; Actress: Jing Tian for Special ID & Police Story 2013
2014; 6th (awarded in 2015)	Jacob Cheung for The White Haired Witch of Lunar Kingdom; Guo Jingming (2nd win) for Tiny Times 3	Male actor: Donnie Yen for Iceman & The Monkey King; Actress: Yang Mi (2nd win) for Tiny Times 3 & The Breakup Guru
2015; 7th (awarded in 2016)	He Jiong for Forever Young; Wei Nan & Wei Min for Oh My God	Male actor: Deng Chao for Devil and Angel; Actress: Yang Mi (3rd win) for Tiny Times 4 & You Are My Sunshine
2016; 8th (awarded in 2017)	Wong Jing for From Vegas to Macau III & Mission Milano; Jeffrey Lau for A Chinese Odyssey Part Three	Male actor: Kris Wu for L.O.R.D: Legend of Ravaging Dynasties, Never Gone, Sweet Sixteen; Actress: Jing Tian (2nd win) for The Great Wall
2017; 9th (awarded in 2018)	Wang Baoqiang for Buddies in India; Bi Zhifei for Pure Hearts: Into Chinese Showbiz	Male actor: Zheng Kai for The Golden Monk; Actress: Liu Yifei for Once Upon a Time & The Chinese Widow
2018; 10th (awarded in 2019)	Guo Degang for The Faces of My Gene; Wong Chun-chun for Girls 2	Male actor: Yue Yunpeng for The Faces of My Gene; Actress: Lou Yixiao for Love Apartment
2019; 11th (awarded in 2020)	Teng Huatao for Shanghai Fortress; Ching Siu-tung for Jade Dynasty	Male actor: Xiao Zhan for Jade Dynasty; Actress: Meng Meiqi for Jade Dynasty
2020; 12th (awarded in 2021)	Xu Zhanxiong for Wild Grass; Guo Jingming (3rd win) for The Yin-Yang Master: Dream of Eternity and L.O.R.D: Legend of Ravaging Dynasties 2	Male actor: Huang Jingyu for Wild Grass and Oversize Love; Li Xian for The Enigma of Arrival and Soul Snatcher; Actress: Amber Kuo for The Story of Hay Bo (2020) and L.O.R.D: Legend of Ravaging Dynasties 2
