= Liu Yuning discography =

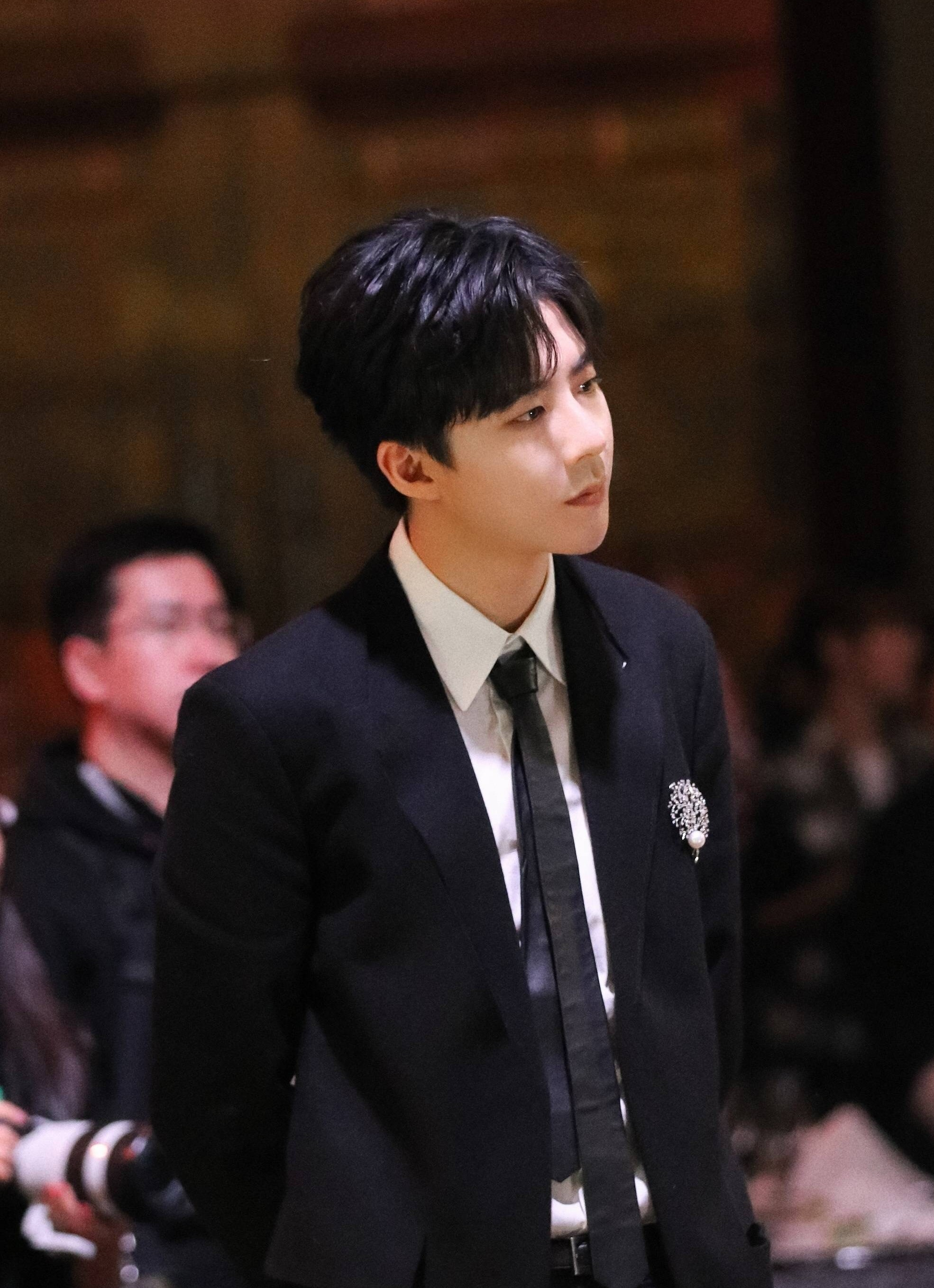
- Studio albums: 2
- EPs: 2
- Singles: 34
- Music videos: 12

This is the discography for Chinese singer Liu Yuning.

== Studio albums ==
Title	Album details	Track list
Ten (十)	Release date: December 15, 2019; Label: Golden Dog, Universal Music; Format: Digital download, streaming, vinyl	Track listing: 1. Obviously (明明) Written by Zhong Wanyun.; 2. Adore (十分喜欢) Lyrics by Lan Xiaoxie, composed by Penny Tai.; 3. Praying (黑夜一束光) Lyrics by Yitong & Yutian, composed by Yutian.; 4. Till the end (啊默契) Lyrics by Katie Lee, composed by Wu Qing-feng.; 5. Empathy (同温层) Written by Lala Hsu.; 6. Mirage (盗梦) Written by Tang Hanxiao.; 7. My O My Written by Yutian.; 8. You Know Nothing (你怎么又懂了) Lyrics by Wang Tianfang (FrankiD), composed by Kim Dong-yeol.; 9. The Opposite (往世界反方向走) Lyrics by David Ke & Dru Chen, composed by Tanya Chua.; 10. Missing (不需要想念) Written by Yutian.
Liu Yuning's (刘宇宁的)	Debut date: July 19, 2025; Label: Tencent Music; Format: Digital download, streaming	Track listing|: 1. Con las Estrellas (星辰与共) Written by Finn Liu.; 2. Your Gaze (你的眼神) Written by Young Captain.; 3. Missing You (想你了) Lyrics by Laird & Hsieh Chin Lin, composed by Laird.; 4. Heartbroken People Are Dancing (伤心的人在跳舞) Written by Sean Tang.; 5. If Without You (若沒有你) written by Laird; 6. For Tomorrow (给明天的) written by Laird; 7. Fire Again (不会太晚) written by Penny Tai

== Extended plays ==
Title	Album details	Track list
Promise (如约)	Released: 2020; Format: Digital download, streaming; Label: ZZ Music (星影乐), Modern Brothers	Track listing: 1. Promise (如约); 2. Satellite Lover (人造卫星情人); 3. One side (一边); 4. An Island (一座岛)
Listen∙Ning	Released: December 8, 2020; Label: Tencent Music; Format: Digital download, streaming	Track listing: 1. Loyal Audience (忠实观众); 2. Hope You Are Well (别来无恙); 3. Handwritten Fairy Tale (手写童话)

== Singles ==
Title	Year
"Imagination" (想象)	2018
"Not Asking" (不求)	2019
"Beggar" (乞丐)	2019
"Where is the Lonely Man" (孤独的人在哪里)	2019
"New Year's Song" (过年的歌)	2020
"Stay up Late" (熬夜)	2020
"Fall in Love"	2022
"A Good Year" (一個好年)	2023

=== Collaboration singles ===
Title	Year	Note
"That Girl"	2019	with Olly Murs & Corsak (Corsak remix)
"Howlin" (颠倒的梦)	2020	with hip-hop group Far East Movement. Liu co-wrote lyrics with Kevin Nishimura/ James Roh/ Virman Coquia/ Sactica Nhem/ Huang ShaoFeng
"Flying on Paper" (纸上飞行)	2020	with Corsak
"What a World" (世界超有趣)	2025	with Honglie Sun, Naiwen Li, Chen He, Gong Jun, Chen Xingxu, Wang Yuwen and Ouyang Di Di
"Mentioned You" (提到了你)	2025	with Lay Zhang
"Beloved" (念旧的人都困在回忆里)	2025	with Chinese band Galaxy Express

=== Promotional singles ===
Title	Year	Note
My Way is My Path (我行即我道)	2018	Theme song for video game Demi-Gods and Semi-Devils (新天龙八部)
Deep Friendship (情深誼長)	2019	For the 70th Anniversary of the People's Republic of China, originally by Deng Yuhua (邓玉华)
Happy New Year Do Re Mi (新年抖來咪)	2019	with Jolin Tsai and other TikTok influencers for Chinese New Year
Wind is Blowing (风在吹)	2020	Theme song for Lay's Chinese New Year promo film
A Song of Liangzhou (凉州词)	2020	Live version for TV show Classics Passed On Season 3, episode 4. Based on the Tang dynasty poem of the same name by poet Wang Han
Magical Surprise (奇妙的惊喜)	2021	5th Anniversary theme song for Shanghai Disneyland
Judgement of the Underworld (天判)	2021	10th Anniversary theme song for video game A Chinese Ghost Story (倩女幽魂)
Defeat (擊潰)	2021	Character theme song of Tang San (唐三) for video game Soul Land (新斗罗大陆)
Heritage (传承)	2021	Promotional song for the Palace Museum, inspired by the collection of calligraphy Pingfu Tie (平復帖) by Lu Ji
The Cloud of Hometown (故乡的云)	2021	For the 100th Anniversary of the Chinese Communist Party, originally by Wen Zhang (文章)
No Fear of Heat (肆无惧燥)	2022	Promotional Song for Sprite Limelight
Ocean (海)	2023	For the Tencent Music-led charity music program One Earth, One Love, supporting the United Nations' initiative for ocean protection
Dragon's Roar (龙吟)	2023	Promotional song for the new map of mobile game Justice Online (逆水寒)
To Be Continued (未完待续)	2024	Character promotional song of Doria & Heino for video game Honor of Kings, with Shan Yichun
People Who Strive (努力的人)	2025	For CCTV News, honoring and encouraging those who persist in chasing a dream
A Never-ending Confession (永不散场的告白)	2025	Tribute song for the Closing Ceremony of the 15th Beijing International Film Festival
What a World (世界超有趣)	2025	Theme song for TV variety show Wow the World (地球超新鲜)
All Roads Lead (同归同往)	2025	Promotional song for the 100th Anniversary of the Palace Museum
As if No Return (有去无回)	2025	Theme song for the second chapter If It Returned, It's Not Love(不是有去无回的 不是爱情) of the EP As a Flower, I Never Fail (作为花我从来没败过)

== Soundtrack appearances ==
2018
Release date	Title	Note
Jun 2	Brotherhood (兄弟情)	Ending theme for film Demon Department: The Four Elephants (鎮魔司：四象伏魔)
Jul 16	Most Worthwhile Adventure (最值得的冒險)	Chinese promo track for film Sherlock Gnomes (淘氣大偵探). Chinese cover of Elton John's "Don't Go Breaking My Heart".
Jul 27	Finally Gone (終於走散了)	Main theme for web film Romantic Zhen Xing Shi (羅曼蒂克振興史)
Jul 30	Toast the Wine (让酒)	Interlude for web series Tomb of the Sea (沙海)
Aug 6	Hero's Tear (英雄的泪)	Interlude for web film Romantic Zhen Xing Shi (羅曼蒂克振興史)
Aug 10	Love Song 1910 (恋语1910)	Promo track for web series Shanghai Picked Flowers (十年阳光十年华)
Sep 6	Willing to go on adventures for you (愿意为你去冒险)	Promo track for TV series Eagles and Youngster (天坑鹰猎)
Sep 8	Adventurer (探险家)	Chinese promo track for film Alpha (阿尔法: 狼伴归途)
Sep 12	How Much Love Can Be Repeated (有多少爱可以重来)	Promo track for film Ash Is Purest White (江湖儿女), originally by Michael Huang.
Nov 16	Flames of Fury (怒火)	Main theme for web film Fierce Notebook (刑兇手扎)

2019
Release date	Title	Note
Feb 5	Would Rather (宁愿)	Promo track for TV series Detective Pu Songling (神探蒲松龄)
Mar 25	Our Master (我們的師父)	Theme song for variety show Our Master (我們的師父), with Yu Xiaoguang, Da Zhangwei, Dong Sicheng.
Apr 19	Friendship Days (友情岁月)	Promo track for film Change of Gangster (转型团伙), with Francis Ng (in Cantonese). Originally by Ekin Cheng.
Apr 20	Pretend (装模做样)	Main theme for TV series A Trip to Encounter Love (一场遇见爱情的旅行)
Apr 29	Youth of Yesterday (昨日少年)	Chinese promo track for animation movie Penguin Highway
Jul 15	Promise (如约)	Main theme for film Line Walker 2: Invisible Spy, single for EP Promise (如约).
Aug 4	Contrary (明明)	Promo track for TV series Mr.Fighting (加油，你是最棒的), single for album Ten (十).
Oct 21	The Legendary Man (带风的少年)	Main theme for web series Hot-blooded Youth (热血少年), with Huang Zitao
Oct 25	Precept (戒)	Ending theme for web series Hot-blooded Youth (热血少年)

2020
Release Date	Title	Note
February 27	When I Met You (当遇见你)	Ending theme song for TV series Skate Into Love (冰糖燉雪梨)
March 27	It's Not That Difficult (没那么难)	Ending theme song for web series The Best of You in My Mind (全世界最好的你)
March 30	Bid Farewell (断缘诀)	Main theme song for web series God of Lost Fantasy (太古神王)
May 15	Please Be Happy For Me (要替我幸福)	Ending theme song for web series My Love Enlightens Me (暖暖, 請多指教)
July 6	Tide (浪)	Main theme song for TV series River God 2 (河神2)
July 20	Talking About Love (你说爱情啊)	Main theme song for TV series Young and Beautiful (我的漂亮朋友)
August 24	Colored Glass (琉璃)	Opening theme song for TV series Love and Redemption (琉璃)
August 28	Chinese Taste (中國味)	Theme song for variety show Chinese Restaurant 4 (中餐厅4) with Huang Xiaoming, Lin Shuwei, Zhang Liang, Zhao Liying, Li Haofei.
September 6	Just Want to Hold Your Hand for the Rest of Life (余生只想握紧你的手)	Interlude for TV series To Dear Myself (亲爱的自己)
17 September	Heroes in Harm's Way (逆行者)	Chapter theme song for TV series Heroes in Harm's Way (最美逆行者)
29 September	A Good Guy (挺好个人呐)	Promotional song for film My People, My Homeland (我和我的家乡)
November 19	I Do (我愿意)	Main theme song for web series Love and Lost, original by Faye Wong
December 10	Unseen Sound (冥冥有声)	Main theme song for web series Ultimate Note (终极笔记)
December 11	See You When the Wind Blows (风起时再见)	Main theme song for web series The Burning River (迷霧追蹤)
December 16	Unadorned (无华)	Ending theme song for web series Legend of Fei (有翡), with Jane Zhang

2021
Release date	Title	Note
Jan 21	What If (果如)	Ending theme for TV series Vocation of Love (假日暖洋洋)
Jan 27	The Reason Why Love (爱情之所以)	Interlude for TV series Fighting Youth (正青春)
Feb 4	Palpitation (心动)	Ending theme for web series Dt. Appledog's Time (我的时代, 你的时代)
Feb 8	Young and Promising (青年有为)	Chapter theme for TV series Commitment (约定)
Feb 9	Symphony of Waves (巨浪的交响)	Ending theme for TV series Commitment (约定), with Chen Lingtao, Liu Wei, Elvis Wang, Ding Shung, Duan Aojuan.
Feb 15	Under the Dome (苍穹之下)	Character theme of Dai Mubai (戴沐白) for TV series Douluo Continent (斗罗大陆)
Feb 23	Heavenly Questions (天问)	Opening theme for web series Word of Honor (山河令)
Mar 9	Originally Able To (本可以)	Main theme for web series Rattan (司藤)
Mar 18	Nostalgia (眷恋)	Interlude for TV series You Are My Hero (我是你的城池壁垒)
Apr 7	You Have Me (你是我所有)	Ending theme for web series Love Scenery (良辰美景好时光)
Apr 15	Love at First Sight (一爱如故)	Interlude for TV series The Long Ballad (长歌行)
Apr 21	Life (人生啊)	Theme song for TV series Octogenarian and the 90s (八零九零)
Apr 26	Always Be with You (专属蓝天)	Ending song for web series The Dance of the Storm (风暴舞)
Apr 27	Co-existence (同生)	Interlude for TV series The Love of Hypnosis (南烟斋笔录)
Apr 28	Whisper (呢喃)	Interlude for web series The Dance of the Storm (风暴舞)
Jun 18	Sense (感应)	Emotional theme for web series Ancient Love Poetry (千古玦尘)
Jun 27	The Most Romantic Forgetting (最浪漫的忘记)	Ending theme for web series Never Say Goodbye (不说再见)
Jul 9	Choose to Love You (选择去爱你)	Main theme for web series Lover or Stranger (陌生的恋人)
Jul 25	Fireworks and Stars (烟火星辰)	Opening theme for web series You Are My Glory (你是我的荣耀)
Aug 8	Chang'an (长安)	Opening theme for TV series Stand by Me (与君歌)
Aug 9	Daybreak (破晓)	Main theme for animation series Zi Chuan (紫川)
Sep 17	Be Earnest While You're Young (意气趁年少)	Main theme for web series A Female Student Arrives at the Imperial College (国子监来了个女弟子)
Oct 28	How Long is Lifetime (一生有多远)	Main theme for film Forever Young (不老奇事)
Oct 30	A Thousand Li of Rivers and Mountains (千里江山)	Theme song for the 4th episode of the CCTV documentary The Forbidden City (紫禁城), inspired by the painting of the same name (千里江山图, c.1113) by Wang Ximeng.
Oct 31	Destiny (造化)	Character theme of Wei Wuxian (魏无羡) for animation series Mo Dao Zu Shi (魔道祖师)
Dec 9	Remembrance (念)	Main theme for film Schemes in Antiques (古董局中局)
Dec 14	Spend My Life with You (共度)	Opening theme for web series My Sassy Princess (祝卿好)

2022
Release date	Title	Note
Jan 21	Tiger Roar Spring (虎啸春来)	Main theme for animated film Run, Tiger, Run (小虎墩大英雄)
Jan 25	You are My Starry Sky (你是我的星空)	Interlude for web series Memory of Encaustic Tile (昔有琉璃瓦)
Feb 1	Song of Good Luck (好运歌)	Celebration theme for film Nice View (奇迹 笨小孩), with Zhang Bichen
Feb 2	Only Light (唯一的光)	Opening theme for web series Hello the Sharpshooter (你好, 神枪手)
Feb 10	The Road Less Travelled (少有人走的路)	Ending theme for TV series Pride and Price (盛装)
Apr 6	The Book of Life (生命之书)	Opening theme for TV series Glory of the Special Forces (特战荣耀)
Apr 11	Looking up the Clear Sky (仰望晴空)	Ending theme for TV series Glory of the Special Forces (特战荣耀)
Apr 17	Unparalleled (无双)	Main theme for TV series Who Rules The World (且试天下)
May 9	Gentle Encounter (幸会的温柔)	Emotional theme for TV series Lady of Law (女士的法则)
May 21	Chasable (可追)	Ending theme for web drama Heroes (说英雄谁是英雄), with Zeng Shunxi.
May 27	Flying Through The Clouds(凌云寂)	Character theme of Bai Choufei (白愁飞) for web drama Heroes (说英雄谁是英雄)
Jun 2	A Dream of Splendor (梦华)	Opening theme for TV series A Dream of Splendor (梦华录)
Aug 9	Looking for You (寻一个你)	Romantic theme for web drama Love between Fairy and Devil (苍兰诀)
Sep 19	Go to a Warm Place (去温暖的地方)	Opening theme for web drama Discovery of Romance (恋爱的夏天)
Sep 27	Floating Life (浮生)	Main theme for short drama Imaginative World of Floating Life (浮生之异想世界)
Sep 30	Sunshine, wave, me and you (阳光海浪我和你)	Main theme for web drama Falling into You (炽道)
Oct 14	Light Chaser(追光)	Ending theme for TV series Light Chaser Rescue (追光者)
Oct 26	Love is not to leg go (爱是不放手)	Ending theme for TV series Almost Lover (谁都知道我爱你)
Nov 11	Light (清晖)	Main theme for TV series New Life Begins (卿卿日常)
Dec 22	Gravity (引力)	Ending theme for TV series Flight To You (向风而行)

2023
Release date	Title	Note
Jan 13	Wish to Reunite (愿重逢)	Ending theme for web drama Choice Husband (择君记)
Jan 31	Liu Yao (六爻)	Theme for animation Liu Yao (六爻)
Feb 8	Speak With You (与子成说)	Opening theme for TV series The Starry Love (星落凝成糖)
Feb 10	Microscopical World (微世界)	Ending theme for web drama Under the Microscope (显微镜下的大明)
Feb 14	Sky Light (天光)	Opening theme for TV series The Journey of Chongzi (重紫)
Feb 23	Dawn and Dusk (朝暮)	Opening theme for TV series Warm on a Cold Night (九尧寒夜暖)
Mar 17	Manifesto (望道)	Main theme for film Manifesto (望道), with 8點組樂團
Mar 20	Long Promise (長相諾)	Character theme of Ning Yuxuan (宁钰轩) for TV series Romance of a Twin Flower (春闺梦里人)
Mar 29	Home Ground (反客为主)	Character theme for TV series Nothing But You (爱情而已)
Apr 6	My World (我愛的這個世界)	Opening theme for web drama Till The End of the Moon (长月烬明)
Apr 21	Hidden Hero (隐侠)	Opening theme for animation My Heroic Husband (赘婿)
Apr 28	The Cloud Trick (云字诀)	Main theme for TV series The Ingenious One (云襄传)
May 4	Rising (初升)	Character theme for TV series Gen Z (后浪)
May 9	The Wind Blows (风吹过)	Ending theme for TV series Back From The Brink (护心)
Jun 7	The Remaining Life (余生)	Ending theme for web drama Gone With The Rain (微雨燕双飞)
Jun 23	Hastily (匆匆)	Interlude for TV series Destined (長風渡)
Jun 30	Master (主宰)	Main theme for animation The Great Ruler (大主宰)
Jul 4	I've Been in Love for a Long Time (愛了很久)	Ending theme for TV series Twilight (暮色心約)
Jul 10	Second Middle School Second Diary (中中二日記)	Merry theme for animated film Tea No. 2 Middle School (茶啊二中) (in Northeast dialect)
Jul 12	Windbreaker (風衣)	Interlude for TV series Fireworks of My Heart (我的人間煙火)
Jul 16	May the Light (願光)	Ending theme for web drama Legend of Anle (安乐传)
Jul 19	I Only Wish to Face the Light (我只願朝著光)	Opening theme for TV series Be Your Own Light (做自己的光)
Jul 20	If Love Responds (如果愛回應)	Ending theme for TV series Be Your Own Light (做自己的光), with Liu Tao.
Jul 23	Just Above the Rivers and Lakes (就在江湖之上)	Opening theme for TV series Mysterious Lotus Casebook (蓮花樓)
Aug 10	Until The End of Time (直到時間盡頭)	Theme for web drama Love You Seven Times (七時吉祥)
Aug 18	Scorching Heart (灼心)	Emotional theme for web drama The Legend of Zhuohua (灼灼風流)
Sep 9	Fierce Wind is Raging (狂風襲來)	Interlude for web drama Parallel World (西出玉門), rap by Kun (琨)
Sep 15	Distant Resemblance (遙遠的相似)	Opening theme for TV series South Wind Knows (南風知我意)
Sep 25	Fated (命中注定)	Interlude for TV series Bright Eyes in the Dark (他從火光中走來)
Oct 8	'Don't be Sad' Song (莫悲歌)	Ending theme for web drama Tiger and Crane (虎鶴妖師錄)
Nov 5	If Love Remembers (如果愛記得)	Ending theme for web drama Wonderland of Love (樂遊原)
Nov 28	Offer (奉上)	Opening theme for TV series A Journey To Love (一念關山)
Nov 28	Don't Dream of Cold (別夢寒)	Interlude for TV series A Journey To Love (一念關山)
Dec 2	Endless Sea (無盡海)	Ending theme for web drama South Sea Tomb (南海歸墟), with Pan Yueming.

2024
Release date	Title	Note
Jan 24	Tianhe's Dream (天河梦)	Character theme song for web drama Chinese Paladin 4 (仙剑四)
Feb 10	You Only Live Once (热辣滚烫)	Ending theme song for feature film YOLO (热辣滚烫)
Feb 21	Don't Ask About the Future (莫问前程)	Opening theme song for web drama White Cat Legend (大理寺少卿游)
Feb 28	Old Friend (老朋友)	Ending theme song for web drama Eternal Brotherhood (紫川·光明三杰)
Mar 15	Born to Die (向死而生)	Interlude for web drama Burning Flames (武庚紀)
Mar 18	Ages (世世)	Interlude for TV series The Legend of Shen Li (与凤行)
Apr 2	Run Through Memories Towards You (穿越回忆奔向你)	Main theme song for web drama Sword and Fairy (又见逍遥)
Apr 24	Daybreak (拂曉)	Ending theme song for TV series In the Name of the Brother (哈尔滨一九四四)
Apr 30	The Truth (開始推理吧)	Theme song for variety show The Truth 2 (开始推理吧2), with Bai Yu, Dilraba, Zhang Linghe, Zhou Keyu.
May 4	No Matter (唯一的回答)	Ending theme song for web drama Men in Love (请和这样的我恋爱吧)
May 21	Heroes (天行健)	Main theme song for web drama Heroes (天行健), with Fu Jing.
June 24	My Heart (心悠悠)	Interlude for web drama Follow Your Heart (颜心记)
July 10	Author (作者)	Main theme song for web drama Interlaced Scenes (錯位)
July 12	You Are The One	Main theme song for web drama A Beautiful Lie (你的谎言也动听)
August 2	Lone Journey (孤舟)	Main theme song for TV series A Lonely Hero’s Journey (孤舟)
August 25	Fearless (一往无畏)	Main theme song for TV series Melody of Golden Age (长乐曲)
September 14	Let Bygones be Bygones (就让过去都过去)	Ending theme song for feature film A Frozen Rage (一雪前耻)
September 17	Search for Shore (寻岸)	Main theme song for TV series Dark Night and Down (暗夜与黎明)
September 21	Ordinary (寻常)	Ending theme song for web drama Love of Nirvana (流水迢迢)
October 7	Splashing Ink (泼墨)	Emotional theme for TV series The Rise of Ning (锦绣安宁)
October 16	Do Not Dare to Welcome Spring (不敢逢春)	Song for TV series Kill Me Love Me (春花焰 )
October 28	Return After A Long Dream (大梦归离)	Opening theme song for web drama Fangs of Fortune (大梦归离)
October 29	This Journey (这一路)	Opening theme song for web drama Our Days (好团圆)
November 1	Only Wish (惟愿)	Ending theme song for web drama The Story of Pearl Girl (珠帘玉幕)
December 3	Year Long (年长)	Song for web drama Brocade Odyssey (蜀锦人家)

2025
Release date	Title	Note
February 14	Circle of Fate (缘圈)	Interlude for TV series "Love of the Divine Tree, also known as Xian Tai You Shu" (仙台有树)
April 8	Like a Dream, Like You (如梦亦如你)	Opening theme song for TV series Clash of the Titans, also known as Qian Qiu Ling (千秋令)
April 17	The World Is Only Us (世界只有我们)	Main theme song for TV series Eat Run Love, also known as Chi Fan Pao Bu He Lian Ai (吃饭跑步和恋爱)
May 14	Blazing Moon (烽月)	Emotional / Ending theme song for TV series The Prisoner of Beauty, also known as Zhe Yao (折腰)
May 21	An Unanswered Question for a Thousand Years (问千年)	Main theme song for TV series The Lost National Treasure, also known as Hu Bao Xun Zong (护宝寻踪)
May 30	I Only Wish (我只愿)	Emotional theme for film Endless Journey of Love, also known as Shi Jian Zhi Zi (时间之子)
June 9	After the Nightmare (梦魇之后)	Main theme song for web drama The Seven Relics of Ill Omen, also known as Qi Gen Xin Jian (七根心简)
June 24	Carefree Immortal (逍遥仙)	Interlude for TV series The Lychee Road, also known as Chang'an De Li Zhi (长安的荔枝)
June 30	In the Name of You (以你之名)	Ending theme song for TV series In The Name Of Justice, also known as Yi Fa Zhi Ming (以法之名)
July 2	Balled of the Long Wind (长风谣)	Opening theme song for TV series A Dream within a Dream, also known as Shu Juan Yi Meng (书卷一梦)
July 2	Paper Person (纸片人)	Sad song for TV series A Dream within a Dream, also known as Shu Juan Yi Meng (书卷一梦)
July 4	Comrades (同袍)	Main theme song for TV series Homeland Guardian, also known as Shou Cheng Zhe (守诚者)
July 15	Vast (浩渺)	Opening theme song for TV series Rose and Gun, also known as Ai Shang Hai Jun Lan (爱上海军蓝)
August 5	Rising through the Night (踏夜升明)	Ending theme song for TV series The Wanted Detective, also known as Ding Feng Bo (定风波)
August 15	Rising to the Sky (踏苍穹)	Interlude for TV series When Destiny Brings the Demon, also known as Xian Yu (献鱼)
August 23	My Eyes Are Only on You (独爱)	Interlude for TV series Shadow Love, also known as Yu Jin Chang'an (与晋长安)
October 1	I Love You, China (我爱你中国)	Ending theme song for film The Volunteers: Peace at Last (志愿军：浴血和平)
October 8	Poisonous Wine (毒酒)	Interlude for web drama Love in the Clouds, also known as Ru Qing Yun (入青云)
October 22	Meeting You with the Caress of the Spring Wind (不沐春风不遇你)	Main and ending theme song for TV series Whispers of Fate, also known as Shui Long Yin (水龙吟), with Jane Zhang
October 23	Never Forget (不忘)	Interlude for TV series Blood River, also known as An He Zhuan (暗河传)
October 28	A Thousand Swords Cannot Change (万剑不改)	Main and ending theme song for TV series Sword of Beloved, also known as Tian Di Jian Xin (天地剑心)
November 8	That Flower (那朵花)	Main theme song for TV series Those Days, also known as Si Xi (四喜)
November 24	Ten Thousand Taels (万两)	Main theme song for TV series Legend of the Magnate, also known as Da Sheng Yi Ren (大生意人)
December 12	Lone Game in Chang'an (孤奕长安)	Main theme song for TV series The Vendetta of An, also known as Chang'an Er Shi Si Ji (长安二十四计)
December 19	After the loss, Things Remain the Same (失去后一切如常)	Growth song for web drama Shine on Me, also known as Jiao Yang Si Wo (骄阳似我)
December 30	Lost Memories (消失的记忆)	Ending theme song for TV series Forever Young (轻年)

2026
Release date	Title	Note
January 14	Galloping with Songs (纵马踏歌行)	Interlude for web animation "Sword of Coming, also known as Jian Lai" (剑来) season 2
February 3	The Honor (荣光)	Ending theme song for TV series "The Truth, also known as Feng Guo Liu Hen" (风过留痕)
February 4	The Loyalty (忠诚)	Ending theme song for film "Scare Out, also known as Jing Zhe Wu Sheng" (惊蛰无声)
February 22	Guo Qiao Ren (过桥人)	Main theme song for TV series "Our Dazzling Days, also known as Yan Hua Shao Nian / Sui Yue You Qing Shi" (岁月有情时)

== Music videos ==
Title	Year	Notes
Youth of Yesterday (昨日少年)	2019	Chinese promotional song for Japanese animation film "Penguin Highway"
Till the End (啊默契)	2019	4th track of album "Ten (十)"
New Year's Song (过年的歌)	2020	5th solo single
Wind is Blowing (風在吹)	2020	Theme song for Lay's Chinese New Year promo film
Praying (黑夜一束光)	2020	3rd track of album "Ten (十)"
Judgement of the Underworld (天判)	2021	10th Anniversary theme song for online game "A Chinese Ghost Story"
A Thousand Miles of Rivers and Mountains (千里江山)	2021	Theme song for the 4th episode of the large-scale documentary "The Forbidden City"
No Fear of Heat (肆無懼燥)	2022	Promotional song for "Sprite"
Dragon's Roar (龙吟)	2023	Promotional song for the new map of mobile game "Justice Online"
To Be Continued (未完待续)	2024	Character promotional song of Doria & Heino for video game Honor of Kings, with Shan Yichun
"What a World" (世界超有趣)	2025	with Honglie Sun, Naiwen Lee, Michael Chen, Simon Gong, Michael Chen, Xingxu Chen, Uvin Wang & Di-Di OuYang
The Loyalty (忠诚)	2026	Promotional song for film "Scare Out, also known as Jing Zhe Wu Sheng" (惊蛰无声)
XingGe (行歌)	2026	Promotional song of Year of the Horse - Skin Cinematic for video game "Honor of Kings" (王者荣耀)
