= Consort Shen =

Tang Dynasty imperial consort

Empress Ruizhen (睿真皇后)
- Born: Unknown
- Died: Disappeared 759, Declared officially dead c.October 805
- Spouse: Emperor Daizong of Tang (Li Chu)
- Issue: Emperor Dezong (Li Kuo)
- Father: Shen Yizhi

Consort Shen (personal name unknown) (disappeared 759), formally Empress Ruizhen (睿真皇后, literary meaning "the wise and true empress"), was a Tang dynasty woman who served as a consort of Emperor Daizong of Tang (Li Chu) while he was the Prince of Guangping under his grandfather Emperor Xuanzong and father Emperor Suzong and the mother of the future Emperor Dezong (Li Kuo). She was captured by the rebel Yan forces during Anshi Rebellion, and although Li Chu regained her at one point during the war, was lost again later during the war. Despite efforts by Emperors Daizong and Dezong to locate her after the war, they were never able to find her. She was finally declared deceased by her great-grandson Emperor Xianzong in 805.

== Before the Anshi Rebellion ==
It is not known when the future Consort Shen was born, but it is known that her family was from Wuxing (吳興, in modern Huzhou, Zhejiang) and that her clan was a prominent clan in the area. Her father Shen Yizhi (沈易直) had, at one point, served in the imperial government as Dali Zheng(大理正), second-in-command of the Imperial Court, and later was honored by Emperor Daizong as Mishu Jian (秘書監), the director of the Palace Library. Towards the end of Emperor Xuanzong's Kaiyuan era (713–741), she, as the daughter of a reputable household, was selected for the palace of Emperor Xuanzong's son and crown prince Li Heng, but was from there further given to Li Heng's oldest son, Li Chu the Prince of Guangping. She was not designated Li Chu's wife—and neither was any other consort of his, including the most prominent one, a Consort Cui whose mother was the Lady of Han, a highly honored woman at court due to her status as the sister of Emperor Xuanzong's favorite concubine Yang Guifei. She gave birth to Li Chu's oldest son, Li Kuo, in May 742.

== During the Anshi Rebellion and disappearance ==
In 755, the general An Lushan rebelled at Fanyang and soon attacked south and established a new state of Yan, with him as emperor and its capital at Luoyang (Tang's eastern capital). By summer 756, Yan forces were approaching the Tang capital Chang'an, forcing Emperor Xuanzong to flee to Chengdu. Li Heng did not follow Emperor Xuanzong to Chengdu; rather, he fled to Lingwu, where he was declared emperor (as Emperor Suzong). Li Chu followed his father to Lingwu as well. Consort Shen was left at Chang'an, and she was captured and taken by Yan forces to Luoyang and detained in the palace jail. In 757, after An Lushan's son An Qingxu had assassinated An Lushan and succeeded him as emperor, a joint Tang and Huige force, commanded by Li Chu, recaptured Chang'an and then Luoyang. Li Chu reunited with Consort Shen in Luoyang, but as at that time he was busy with planning a campaign against An Qingxu's remaining forces, he did not get the chance to have Consort Shen escorted back to Chang'an. In 758, Shi Siming, a former major general under An Lushan and An Qingxu who had briefly submitted to Tang, rebelled against Tang authority and advanced south. By 759, he had claimed the imperial title (by establishing the state of Yan) and recaptured Luoyang. That was the last that Li Chu saw Consort Shen, as she was nowhere to be found when Tang and Huige forces again recaptured Luoyang in 762 against Shi Siming's son and successor Shi Chaoyi (by which point Li Chu, whose name had been changed to Li Yu, was emperor (as Emperor Daizong)).

== Post-Anshi Rebellion efforts to locate her ==
Emperor Daizong designated Li Kuo as crown prince, and he repeatedly sent imperial messengers throughout the realm to try to locate Consort Shen, but was unable to do so. In 765, a Buddhist nun named Guangcheng (廣澄) claimed that she was Consort Shen—but after interrogation, it was shown that she merely served as Li Kuo's wet nurse. Emperor Daizong had her whipped to death.

Emperor Daizong died in 779, and Li Kuo became emperor (as Emperor Dezong). In 780, although Consort Shen had not been located, he honored her in absentia as empress dowager. His official Gao Can (高參) suggested sending out officials to look for her again. Emperor Dezong put his younger brother Li Shu (李述) the Prince of Mu in nominal charge of the project, with the minister Qiao Lin as Li Shu's deputy. He also commissioned four members of the Shen family to assist the eunuchs sent out to find her.

In 781, there was an incident where it was thought that Empress Dowager Shen was in fact located. The lady in waiting Li Zhenyi (李真一) had interviewed an adoptive daughter of the once-powerful eunuch Gao Lishi, who had previously served inside the palace and was familiar with the events inside the palace. Li Zhenyi thought she might have been Empress Dowager Shen, and reported this to Emperor Dezong. At that time, no elders of the Shen family remained to tell whether Lady Gao was in fact Empress Dowager Shen, and the eunuchs and ladies in waiting who met her all thought she was Empress Dowager Shen. She initially denied that she was Empress Dowager Shen, but the eunuchs forcibly escorted her to Shangyang Palace (上陽宮), a palace that Emperor Dezong had set aside for Empress Dowager Shen, and supplied her with goods intended for the empress dowager. Lady Gao was enticed and induced into claiming that she was in fact Empress Dowager Shen. Emperor Dezong was very pleased and prepared for a ceremony to formally welcome her. Lady Gao's adoptive brother Gao Chengyue (高承悅) found out and feared that, if she were discovered, disaster would descend on the Gao household, and therefore submitted a letter to Emperor Dezong detailing her history. Emperor Dezong thus sent an adoptive grandson of Gao Lishi's, Fan Jingchao (樊景超), to meet her. When Fan saw her, he cried out, "Aunt, why are you putting yourself on the cutting board?" Her attendants, surprised at this disrespect for the "empress dowager", ordered him to leave. Instead, Fan yelled, "The Emperor has issued an edict: the Empress Dowager is not real. Leave now!" After the attendants left, Lady Gao protested to Fan that she was forced to claim herself to be Empress Dowager Shen. However, Emperor Dezong, fearing that punishing her would cause others to be unwilling to continue searching for Empress Dowager Shen, did not punish her and escorted her back to her home in a wagon. He stated, "I would rather be defrauded 100 times, as long as I can find my mother." It was said that after the Lady Gao incident, there were four other incidents in which women pretended to be Empress Dowager Shen but were proven to be not real. The real Empress Dowager Shen was never found.

In his mother's absence, Emperor Dezong honored her household greatly, including bestowing great honors posthumously on her father Shen Yizhi, grandfather Shen Jiefu (沈介福), uncle Shen Yiliang (沈易良), and brother Shen Zhen (沈震). It was said that more than 100 members of the Shen household were given titles. In 805, Emperor Dezong died and was succeeded by his severely ill son Emperor Shunzong, who in turn yielded the throne to his son Emperor Xianzong later in the year. At the suggestion of officials who pointed out that there was no further hope at that point of locating Empress Dowager Shen, Emperor Xianzong declared her deceased in c.October and had her formally enshrined in the temple of Emperor Dezong two months later.

== Modern representations ==
Starting in January 2017, The Glory of Tang Dynasty (大唐荣耀) aired on Beijing Satellite TV. Jing Tian (The Great Wall (film)) starred as Shen Zhenzhu with Ren Jialun playing her husband.

== Notes and references ==
- Old Book of Tang, vol. 52.
- New Book of Tang, vol. 77.
- Zizhi Tongjian, vols. 223, 226, 236.
