= The Epic of a Woman =

- 一个女人的史诗
- Created by: Yan Geling
- Starring: Zhao Wei; Liu Ye; Wu Mian; Jing Tian
- Country of origin: China
- No. of episodes: 44

Original release
- Network: Jiangsu Television
- Release: January 2009

The Epic of a Woman is a 2009 Chinese television series produced by Jiangsu Television. It is adapted from the same title novel by Yan Geling.

== Cast ==
- Tian Sufei played by Zhao Wei
- Ouyang Yu, played by Liu Ye
- Ouyang Xue, played by Jing Tian
- Tian's mom, played by Fang Zichun
- Wu's mom, played by Wu Mian

== Casting ==
Zhao was picked by original writer Yan Geling to play "Tian Sufei".

== Reception ==
After airing, the series received favorable reviews. Contemporary TV commented "The drama series and Tian Sufei explores times aesthetics." Young Writer wrote "Though Tian Sufei's life, the show is a refraction of history" and "differ from the other female character in mainland shows, she chose the man she love, obey the leader's order". Movie Review described the series "From 1940s-1980s, Tian Sufei's fate grabs audience's heart." Popular Art praised Zhao, "For her remarkable performance, Zhao Wei portrays Tian Sufei, the most impressive character since the Little Swallow ."

Yan Geling said "Zhao did a terrific job. I was moved to tears watching the episode in which Sufei was divorcing her husband, she acted really marvelous and beautiful. The role was very challenging as Sufei was a lot more mature than Zhao's real age, yet her performance is so accurate which is quite extraordinary.
