= The Glory of Tang Dynasty =

Chinese television series

- Promotional poster
- Genre: Historical fiction Political; Romance
- Based on: The Concubine of Tang: Legend of Pearl by Cang Mingshui
- Written by: Liu Fang; Li Huimin
- Directed by: Liu Guonan; Yin Tao
- Starring: Jing Tian; Ren Jialun; Wan Qian; Shu Chang; Yu Xiaowei; Qin Junjie; Mao Zijun
- Composer: S.E.N.S.
- Country of origin: China
- Original language: Mandarin
- No. of episodes: 60 (1st season); 32 (2nd season)

Production
- Producer: Wang Ying
- Running time: 45 mins
- Production companies: H&R Century Pictures
- Budget: ¥2.6 billion

Original release
- Network: Anhui TV; Beijing TV
- Release: 29 January – 3 May 2017

The Glory of Tang Dynasty (Chinese: 大唐荣耀) is a 2017 Chinese television series starring Jing Tian and Ren Jialun. It is based on the novel The Concubine of Tang: Legend of Pearl (大唐后妃传之珍珠传奇) by Cang Mingshui; and tells the fictional love story of Emperor Daizong and Consort Shen, aided by the grandiose historical background of the An Shi Rebellion (755-763). The series was aired for 92 episodes, split into two seasons, from 29 January to 3 May 2017 on Anhui TV and Beijing TV.

The series has been made with a budget of around 260 million yuan ($38.68 million), and shot in 70 sets, with massive digital backup. It received a positive response from the audience for its historical accuracy and storyline. It has a score of 8.3 out of 10 on Tencent and 6.7 on Douban.

== Synopsis ==
The story is about Shen Zhenzhu, the concubine of Emperor Daizong while he was the Prince Li Chu of Guangping. Zhenzhu was an ordinary girl from Jiangnan. Kind-hearted and noble, she stayed behind during the An Lushan Rebellion in order to show solidarity with the Tang citizens. Although she was captured by the opposing forces, she never gave up protecting her people, and remained loyal to her husband despite the pursuit of Moyan Chou, a Uyghur general, and An Qingxu, the son of An Lushan.

After peace was restored, Li Chu was determined to relocate her and bring her back to the palace, ignoring the advice of his fellow officials. However, Zhenzhu refused to return to the palace with him, as she knew her time as a hostage would jeopardize his chances of succeeding the throne. She chose to disappear from the royal court and live among the people she spent her whole life protecting.

== Cast ==
=== Main ===
Actor	Character	Introduction
Jing Tian	Shen Zhenzhu	A proper lady from a noble family selected to become the concubine of Li Chu. She uses her intelligence and strength to assist her husband in rising up to a position of power.
Ren Jialun	Li Chu	Prince of Guangping. A prideful yet passionate man who bravely and resolutely took down his enemies to ascend the throne.
Wan Qian	Dugu Jingyao	Daughter of the Prince of Yunnan. A female general who fought alongside Li Chu. Though she knows that Li Chu does not love her, she still marries him to fulfil his political ambitions. She constantly threatens Shen Zhenzhu and intrudes into her relationship with Li Chu.
Shu Chang	Murong Lingzhi	Daughter of a general, and highly skilled healer. She is also Shen Zhenzhu's good friend. Li Tan fell in love with her at first sight and chose her as his concubine. Despite her kind-hearted nature, she was forced to endure endless pain and humiliation.
Yu Xiaowei	Moyan Chou	The khan of the Uyghur tribe. He and Li Chu are good friends. After saving Shen Zhenzhu multiple times, he fell in love with her. However, later, he marries Li Ruo.
Qin Junjie	Li Tan	Prince of Jianning, a talented hero skilled in horseback riding and archery. He fell in love with Murong Lingzhi at first sight and marries her, but due to his immaturity, accidentally hurts her feelings. Though he possess courage and strength, he is ultimately bound by his fate as a member of the royal family.
Mao Zijun	An Qingxu	Son of An Lushan. He is calculating and paranoid in nature due to his lack of familial love since young. His greatest purpose in life is dedicated to loving Shen Zhenzhu; and when he doesn't get what he wants, decides to kill his father and take over the throne.

=== Supporting ===
==== Royal Family ====
Actor	Character	Introduction
Chin Han	Emperor Xuanzong	Li Chu's grandfather.
Zeng Li	Noble Consort Yang	
Yang Mingna	Lady of Han	Consort Yang's older sister, Cui Caiping's mother
Wang Jinsong	Emperor Suzong	Li Chu, Li Tan and Li Ruo's father.
Fang Xiaoli	Crown Princess Wei	Li Chu, Li Tan and Li Ruo's mother. Her brother was framed by Yang Guozong, and as a result she was deposed and sent to a nunnery.
Liu Liwei	Empress Zhang	Evil empress who tries everything to get her secretly illegitimate son Li Shao onto the throne. However, later she strangles her son in order to prevent Emperor Suzong from finding out Li Shao is not his actual son.
Geng Liming	Royal Consort Pei	
Pu Shuo	Li Xi	Prince of Yue. Li Chu, Li Tan and Li Ruo's step-brother.
Zhang Weina	Li Ruo	Li Chu and Li Tan's biological sister. She is innocent and spirited. Though she has a crush on An Qingxu, she later marries Moyan Chou to assist the Royal Family's political ambitions.
Xu Weiluo	Li Zhao	Li Chu, Li Tan and Li Ruo's step-brother. His actual identity is the son of Shi Siming and Empress Zhang.
Tang Jingmei	Cui Caiping	Niece of Consort Yang. She likes Li Chu and uses her family connections to marry him. Though she's from a wealthy family, she lacks the noble dignity that Shen Zhenzhu has.
Ma Wenyue	Li Chengcai	Prince of Dunhuang.
Zhang Zheyu	Li Shi	Li Chu and Shen Zhenzhu's son.

==== Officials ====
Actor	Character	Introduction
Du Yuan	Yang Guozhong	
Lam Suet	An Lushan	
Lu Xingyu	Shi Siming	
Ma Xiaofeng	Gao Lishi	
Lee Tien-chu	Li Fuguo	
Chang Cheng	Li Mi	
Wang Boqing	Chen Xuanli	
Chen Zhihui	Guo Ziyi	
Zhang Haifeng	Cheng Yuanzhen	

==== Uyghurs ====
Actor	Character	Introduction
Ma Chengcheng	Hasili	Moyan Chou's wife.
Chen Zhelun	Yidijian	Moyan Chou's son.
Wang Xiaowei	Nibifei	Moyan Chou's brother.
Zhao Dongze	Yehu	Moyan Chou's god-brother.
Luo Mi	Zhemiyi	Moyan Chou's god-sister. Li Chengcai's wife.
Chen Guan'ning	Dongzebu	A rebel who wants to kill Moyan Chou.
Guo Ruixi	Aqina	Dongze Bu's lover.

==== Shen Family ====
Actor	Character	Introduction
Shen Baoping	Shen Yizhi	Director of the Palace Library. Shen Zhenzhu's father.
Liu Fang	Lady Jiang	Shen Zhenzhu's mother.
Huang Tianqi	Shen An	Shen Zhenzhu's brother.
Mi Mi	Suci	Shen Zhenzhu's personal attendant. To save her son, she was manipulated by He Lingyi and betrayed Shen Zhenzhu.
Xu Siyu	Hongrui	Shen Zhenzhu's personal attendant, who died saving her.

==== Others ====
Actor	Character	Introduction
Feng Li	Zhang Deyu	Guangping Mansion's head attendant.
Liang Jingxian	He Lingyi	Li Chu's underling. She is actually a spy sent by Empress Zhang.
Cao Yuchen	Feng Shengyi	Li Chu's underling.
Lu Peng	Yan Ming	Li Chu's underling.
Wang Jiusheng	Li Bai	Shen Zhenzhu's teacher.
Zhang Chunzhong	Wan Shitong	
Qu Gang	Zhangsun E	Murong Lingzhi and An Qingxu's teacher.

== Soundtrack ==
The Glory of Tang Dynasty - Original Television Soundtrack (大唐荣耀电视剧原声音乐大碟)
No.	Title	Music	Length
1.	"For the Empire (为江山)" (Opening theme song for Season 1)	Sun Nan
2.	"Tang Yun (唐韵)" (Ending theme song for Season 1)	Tan Jing
3.	"Former Thoughts (夙念)"	Yisa Yu
4.	"Bare Face (素颜)"	Henry Huo
5.	"Step Aside for You (为你成全)"	Wan Qian & Li Nan
6.	"Glory (荣耀)" (Opening theme song for Season 2)	Allen Ren
7.	"Pearl (珍珠)" (Ending theme song for Season 2)	Jike Junyi

== Ratings ==
- Highest ratings are marked in red, lowest ratings are marked in blue

=== Season 1 ===
Broadcast date	Episode	Beijing TV CSM52			Anhui TV CSM52		
Broadcast date	Episode	Ratings (%)	Audience share (%)	Rank	Ratings (%)	Audience share (%)	Rank
2017.1.29	1-2	0.362	1.19	5	0.369	1.21	4
2017.1.30	3-4	0.442	1.41	6	0.304	0.97	14
2017.1.31	5-6	0.469	1.50	7	0.395	1.26	10
2017.2.1	7-8	0.485	1.49	6	0.410	1.14	11
2017.2.2	9-10	0.460	1.37	8	0.376	1.12	14
2017.2.3	11-12	0.553	1.57	7	0.356	1.02	14
2017.2.4	13	0.458	1.36	8	0.408	1.21	11
2017.2.5	14-15	0.602	1.7	6	0.373	1.05	13
2017.2.6	16-17	0.562	1.58	7	0.403	1.14	14
2017.2.7	18-19	0.565	1.53	7	0.404	1.1	14
2017.2.8	20-21	0.538	1.47	8	0.459	1.25	9
2017.2.9	22-23	0.556	1.53	8	0.469	1.29	10
2017.2.10	24-25	0.649	1.81	5	0.55	1.53	8
2017.2.11	26	0.479	1.41	7	0.451	1.34	9
2017.2.12	27-28	0.612	1.73	6	0.451	1.28	12
2017.2.13	29-30	0.531	1.50	9	0.514	1.45	11
2017.2.14	31-32	0.569	1.68	9	0.573	1.67	8
2017.2.15	33-34	0.607	1.72	7	0.493	1.4	11
2017.2.16	35-36	0.604	1.73	7	0.462	1.33	14
2017.2.17	37-38	0.635	1.76	5	0.446	1.24	14
2017.2.18	39	0.615	1.83	6	0.404	1.21	15
2017.2.19	40-41	0.79	2.19	6	0.443	1.23	13
2017.2.20	42-43	0.731	2.02	6	0.556	1.54	9
2017.2.21	44-45	0.607	1.67	9	0.688	1.9	6
2017.2.22	46-47	0.306	0.85	17	0.638	1.79	8
2017.2.23	48-49	0.651	1.82	7	0.582	1.64	9
2017.2.24	50-51	0.692	1.91	7	0.575	1.6	8
2017.2.25	52	0.762	2.13	6	0.67	1.94	8
2017.2.26	53-54	0.598	1.67	9	0.629	1.77	8
2017.2.27	55-56	0.647	1.92	7	0.551	1.64	9
2017.2.28	57-58	0.605	1.8	8	0.565	1.68	9
2017.3.1	59-60	0.75	2.17	6	0.582	1.69	9
Average ratings		0.586	1.68		0.486	1.40	

=== Season 2 ===
Beijing TV CSM52 City ratings					Anhui TV CSM52 City ratings		
Air date	Episode	Ratings (%)	Audience share (%)	Rank	Ratings (%)	Audience share (%)	Rank
2017.4.3	1-2	0.293	1.698	16	0.282	1.441	17
2017.4.4	3-4	0.266	1.54	17	0.219	1.2	18
2017.4.5	5-6	0.312	1.771	15	0.274	1.492	17
2017.4.10	7-8	-	-	-	0.258	1.496	17
2017.4.11	9-10	0.337	2.16	14	0.218	1.231	21
2017.4.12	11-12	0.341	2.033	12	0.245	1.39	18
2017.4.17	13-14	0.259	1.639	17	0.242	1.321	20
2017.4.18	15-16	0.285	1.784	16	0.229	1.271	18
2017.4.19	17-18	0.294	1.979	13	0.237	1.313	19
2017.4.24	19-20	0.286	1.946	16	0.329	1.842	13
2017.4.25	21-22	0.282	1.79	15	0.307	1.689	14
2017.4.26	23-24	0.269	1.719	17	0.312	1.777	15
2017.5.1	25-26	0.261	2.051	19	0.429	2.481	8
2017.5.2	27-28	0.318	1.947	16	0.324	1.882	15
2017.5.3	29-30	0.356	2.259	14	0.345	2.071	15

== Awards and nominations ==
Year	Award	Category	Nominee	Result
2017	4th Hengdian Film and TV Festival of China	Best Actor	Ren Jialun	Won
