= Jing Tian =

Chinese actress

- 景甜
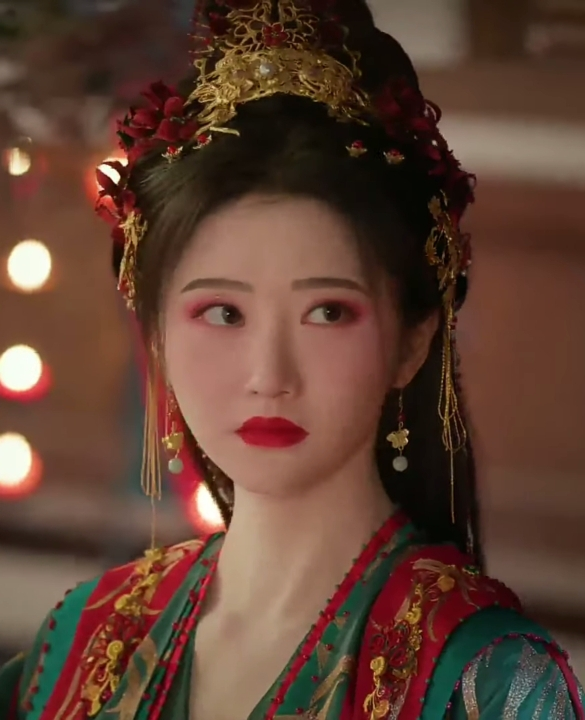
- Jing for the drama Reborn for Love
- Born: Xi'an, Shaanxi, China
- Other name: Sally Jing
- Education: Beijing Film Academy
- Occupation: Actress
- Years active: 2008–present
- Agent(s): Beijing Starlit Movie & TV Culture

Jing Tian (Chinese: 景甜) is a Chinese actress and singer. She is known for the films The Warring States (2011), Special ID (2013), Police Story 2013 (2013), The Great Wall (2016), Kong: Skull Island (2017), Pacific Rim Uprising (2018), as well as TV dramas Legend of Ban Shu (2015), The Glory of Tang Dynasty (2017), and Rattan (2021).

== Career ==
While studying acting at the Beijing Film Academy, Jing made her debut as a singer by releasing an album, Who Are You, produced by Zhang Yadong. Her first acting role was in the 2008 film Anaconda Frightened, followed by period drama The Epic of a Woman. In 2009, she was cast as the lead role in the historical drama Biography of Sun Tsu, which aired in 2013.

In 2011, she gained wide attention for her role in the historical film The Warring States. A few leading roles in high-profile films followed, such as action films Special ID and Police Story 2013 (both in 2013), and the From Vegas to Macau series.

In 2015, Jing starred in the historical romance drama Legend of Ban Shu, playing the title role alongside Zhang Zhehan. The same year, she played the eponymous role in the historical drama The Legend of Xiao Zhuang. Jing starred in three Wanda-backed films, including the Zhang Yimou-directed The Great Wall and two Hollywood films Kong: Skull Island (2017) and Pacific Rim Uprising (2018).

In 2017, Jing starred in the historical fiction drama The Glory of Tang Dynasty alongside Ren Jialun, playing the role of Shen Zhenzhu. Jing starred alongside Chen Bolin in the 2018 fantasy drama The King of Blaze, based on the manga series of the same name. In 2019, Jing starred in the road-trip romance drama Love Journey alongside Chen Xiao. In 2021, she starred in the fantasy drama Rattan.

In 2022, Jing was fined the equivalent of US$1.1 million for promoting Infinite Free candy as a weight loss product.

== Filmography ==
=== Film ===
Year	English title	Chinese title	Role	Notes/Ref.
2008	Anaconda Frightened	狂蟒惊魂	Tian Juan	
2010	My Belle Boss	我的美女老板	Emma	
2011	The Warring States	战国	Tian Xi	
2012	Ultra Reinforcement	超时空救兵	Princess Ling Zhi	
2012	Shadows of Love	影子爱人	Xu Yuan	
2012	Tears in Heaven	新妈妈再爱我一次	Dong Xiaolin	
2013	Better and Better	越来越好之村晚	Lian Sheng	
2013	Special ID	特殊身份	Wan Jing	
2013	Police Story 2013	警察故事2013	Miaomiao	
2014	From Vegas to Macau	澳门风云	Luo Xin	
2014	Dragon Nest: Warriors' Dawn	龙之谷：破晓奇兵	Argenta	Voice-dubbed
2016	The Great Wall	长城	Lin Mae	
2017	Kong: Skull Island	金刚：骷髅岛	San Lin	
2017	Fist & Faith	青禾男高	Liu Mu	
2018	Pacific Rim Uprising	环太平洋：雷霆再起	Liwen Shao	

=== Television series ===
Year	English title	Chinese title	Role	Network	Notes/Ref.
2009	The Epic of a Woman	一个女人的史诗	Ouyang Xue	Jiangsu TV	
2013	Biography of Sun Tsu	孙子大传	Yi Luo	Jiangsu Channel	
2015	Legend of Ban Shu	班淑传奇	Ban Shu	Tencent Video	
2015	The Legend of Xiao Zhuang	大玉儿传奇	Da Yu'er	Sichuan Channel	
2017	The Glory of Tang Dynasty	大唐荣耀	Shen Zhenzhu	Anhui TV, Beijing TV	
2018	The King of Blaze	火王	Qian Mei / Situ Fengjian	Hunan TV	
2019	Love Journey	一场遇见爱情的旅行	Li Xinyue	Jiangsu TV, Zhejiang TV	
2021	Rattan	司藤	Si Teng	Youku	
2022	City of Streamer	流光之城	Feng Shizhen	Tencent Video	
2023	Hi Producer	正好遇见你	Du Qiong	iQIYI, Tencent Video	
2023	The Legend of Zhuohua	灼灼风流	Mu Zhuohua	Tencent Video	
2023	Wonderland of Love	乐游原	Cui Lin / A Ying	Tencent Video	
2024	Love's Rebellion	四海重明	Nan Yan	iQIYI, Mango TV	
2025	Si Jin	似锦	Jiang Si	Tencent Video	
TBA	Coming to Myself	待我醒来时	You Mingxu	CCTV, Tencent Video	
TBA	Long Gu Fen Xiang	龙骨焚箱	Meng Qianzi	Tencent Video	
TBA	Yesterday Once More	同心结	Liu Yang	iQIYI	

=== Television show ===
Year	English title	Chinese title	Role	Notes/Ref.
2017	I Want to Meet You	我想见到你	Cast member	

=== Music video appearances ===
Year	Song title		Singer	Notes/Ref.
2011	"Believe in Yourself"	相信自己	Jackie Chan	

== Discography ==
=== Albums ===
Year	English title	Chinese title	Notes/Ref.
2007	Who Are You	你是谁	

=== Singles ===
Year	English title	Chinese title	Album	Notes/Ref.
2007	"Still Love You	还爱你		Theme song of QQ飞车
2009	"Women like a Poem"	女人如诗	The Epic of a Woman OST	
2010	"Just Be Fine"	好好就好	My Belle Boss OST	with Jiro Wang
2011	"Wind"	风	The Warring States OST	
2012	"Believe in Love"	因为爱 相信爱		Theme song for Believe in Love Charity Concert
2014	"Beloved"	心上人	Legend of Ban Shu OST	
2018	"The New Era of Zanzan"	赞赞新时代		Performance for CCTV New Year's Gala
2019	"We Are All Dream Chasers"	我们都是追梦人		Performance for CCTV New Year's Gala
2020	"A Thousand Bravery"	千万勇敢	Rattan OST	

== Accolades ==
=== Awards and nominations ===
In 2014, Jing won the International Award at the Hollywood Film Awards. The International Award was intended to be given annually, but was discontinued and only awarded once.

Jing has also been nominated for "Most Disappointing Actress" at the Golden Broom Awards (China's equivalent of Golden Raspberry Awards) three times, winning twice.

Year	Award	Category	Nominated work	Result	Ref.
2007	CCTV Mainland Music Top Ten Newcomers Selection		Qiaoyu Antusheng	Top 30	
2007	1st CCTV Arts Ranking	Female Singer Award (Bronze)	—N/a	Won	
2007	1st CCTV Arts Ranking	Music Video Award (Gold)	"Who Are You"	Won	
2007	1st CCTV Arts Ranking	Music Popularity Award (Silver)	"Who Are You"	Won	
2007	3rd Sanya Television Advertisement Arts Festival	Best Spokesperson	—N/a	Won	
2011	中国新世纪10年阳光奖	Most Anticipated Award	—N/a	Won	
2011	China Charities Aid Foundation for Children	Influencer Award	—N/a	Won	
2012	9th Esquire Man At His Best Awards	Most Promising Actress	—N/a	Won	
2013	Chinese Campus Art Glory Festival	Most Popular Actress	—N/a	Won	
2013	4th Golden Broom Awards	Most Disappointing Actress	Shadow of Love, Tears in Heaven	Nominated	
2014	5th Golden Broom Awards	Most Disappointing Actress	Special ID, Police Story 2013	Won	
2014	18th Hollywood Film Awards	Hollywood International Award	—N/a	Won	
2015	Weibo Charity Third Anniversary	Outstanding Contribution Award	—N/a	Won	
2017	8th Golden Broom Awards	Most Disappointing Actress	The Great Wall	Won	
2017	China Screen Ranking	Trend of the Year	—N/a	Won	
2017	L'Officiel Fashion Night Influence Award	Hot Era Reader	—N/a	Won	
2017	24th Cosmo Beauty Ceremony	Beautiful Idol of the Year	—N/a	Won	
2017	9th China TV Drama Awards	Popular Young Actress	—N/a	Won	
2018	Weibo Award Ceremony	Popular Artist	—N/a	Won	
2018	25th Cosmo Beauty Ceremony	Shining Beautiful Idol	—N/a	Won	
2019	Cosmo Glam Night	Person of The Year (Dream)	—N/a	Won	

=== Forbes China Celebrity 100 ===
Year	Rank	Ref.
2017	35th	
2019	70th	
2020	92nd	

== Personal life ==
=== Zhang Jike ===
In March 2018, Jing went public with her relationship with Chinese table tennis player Zhang Jike. They announced their separation in June 2019. In 2023, paparazzo Zhuo Wei claimed that Zhang had provided a casino in Myanmar with intimate videos of Jing to cover a ¥17 million gambling debt. Zhuo, who said he had been contacted by an intermediary for the casino, warned Jing so that she could gather evidence when she was allegedly blackmailed using the videos.

=== Justin Sun ===
In 2026, cryptocurrency businessman Justin Sun sued Jing and her parents in China for ¥30 million that he described as a betrothal gift. Sun claimed that Jing had proposed to have a child through surrogacy but reneged on the egg-retrieval procedure when he refused to provide an additional US$50 million after having consulted an AI chatbot for advice. Jing responded that she would not "ever sell [her] love for money, let alone [her] soul". She went on to comment that her "judgment in men is still poor", and "still lacking in wisdom". Both parties appear to have been subject to online censorship following the breakup and subsequent debate.
