= Jon Jashni =

American media executive

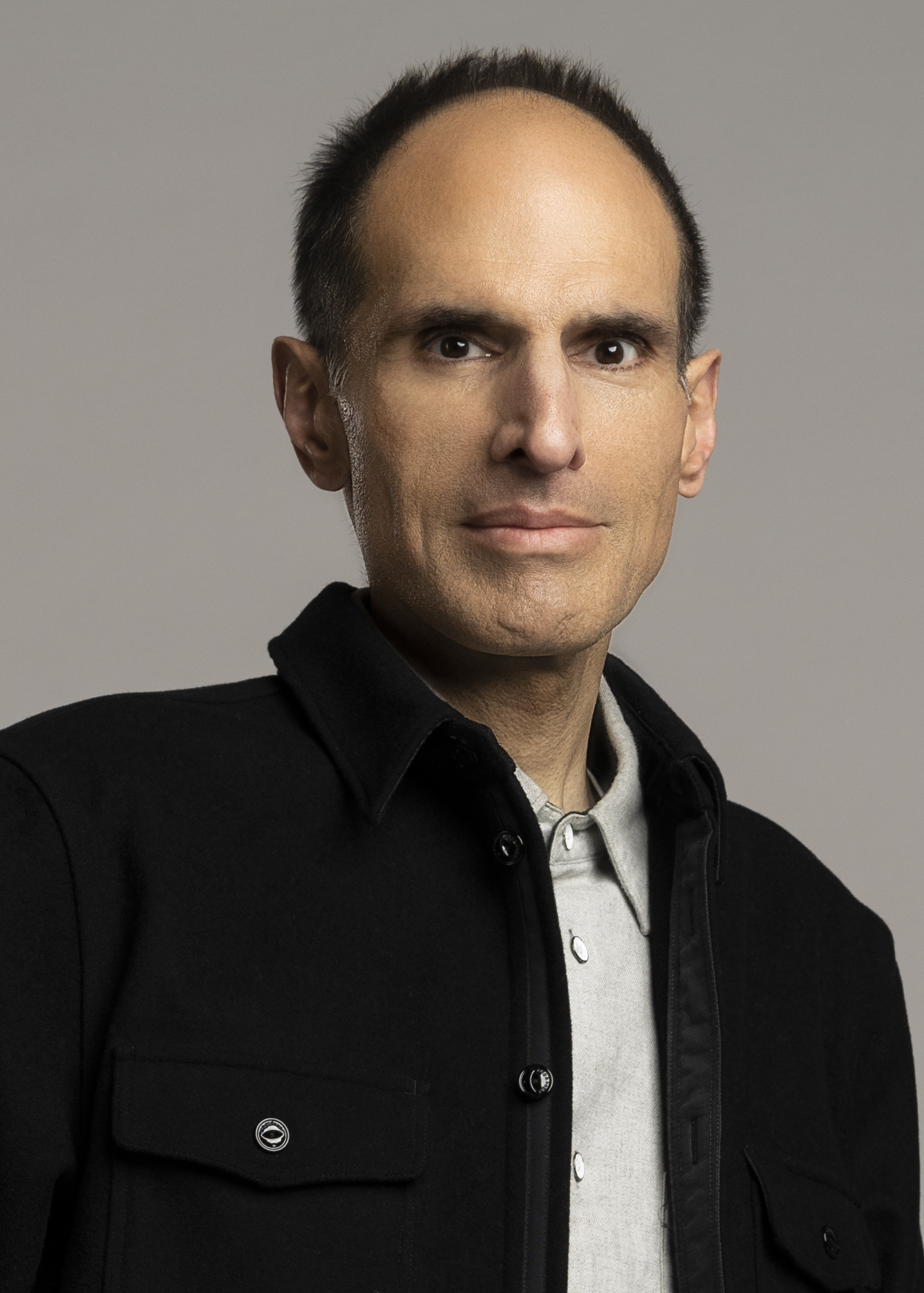
Jon Jashni

Jon Jashni is an American media investor and advisor.

== Work ==
In 1999, Jashni and Kevin Burns formed Synthesis Entertainment, which develops and produces content based on properties of the Irwin Allen estate such as Poseidon, Voyage to the Bottom of the Sea, The Time Tunnel and Lost in Space.

From 2006 to 2016 Jashni was president and chief creative officer of Legendary Entertainment, working as a producer and developing film projects including Kong: Skull Island, The Great Wall, Warcraft, Crimson Peak, Godzilla (2014), 42, and Pacific Rim. He also played a key role in corporate dealings including the sale of Legendary to the Dalian Wanda Group Co for $3.5 billion. In 2016 he started Raintree Ventures, an entertainment-related investment fund.

He is an executive producer of a Netflix Lost in Space series released in 2018.

He is a member of the Academy of Motion Picture Arts and Sciences and the Producers Guild of America, and a trustee emeritus of the American Film Institute.

== Filmography ==
=== Film ===
Executive producer

- The Inkwell (1994)
- Sweet Home Alabama (2002)
- Dreamer (2005)
- Poseidon (2006)
- Trick 'r Treat (2007)
- Observe and Report (2009)
- The Hangover (2009)
- Where the Wild Things Are (2009)
- Ninja Assassin (2009)
- Clash of the Titans (2010)
- Jonah Hex (2010)
- The Town (2010)
- Sucker Punch (2011)
- Wrath of the Titans (2012)
- Jack the Giant Slayer (2013)
- 42 (2013)
- 300: Rise of an Empire (2014)
- Dracula Untold (2014)
- Unbroken (2014)
- Seventh Son (2015)
- Straight Outta Compton (2015)

Producer

- Anna and the King (1999) (co-producer)
- The Hurricane (co-producer)
- Shopgirl (2005)
- Premonition (2007)
- Pacific Rim (2013)
- Godzilla (2014)
- As Above, So Below (2014)
- Blackhat (2015)
- Crimson Peak (2015)
- Krampus (2015)
- Warcraft (2016)
- The Great Wall (2017); co-produced with Thomas Tull, Charles Roven and Peter Loehr
- Kong: Skull Island (2017)
- Pacific Rim Uprising (2018)
- Godzilla: King of the Monsters (2019)
- Godzilla vs. Kong (2021)
- Godzilla x Kong: The New Empire (2024)

=== Television ===
Associate Producer

- Get Smart, Again! (1989)

Executive producer

- The Time Tunnel (2002)
- The Robinsons: Lost in Space (2004)
- Lost in Space (2018)
- Make It Work (2019)
- Equal (2020)
