= Better and Better (film) =

- Traditional Chinese: 越來越好之村晚
- Simplified Chinese: 越来越好之村晚
- Hanyu Pinyin: Yuèlaíyuèhǎo zhī Cūnwǎn
- Directed by: Zhang Yibai; Xie Dongshen
- Written by: Xu Zhengchao
- Produced by: Zhao Haicheng; Yan Pin; Guo Yan
- Starring: Aaron Kwok; Wang Baoqiang; Tong Dawei; Xu Jinglei; Jing Tian; Sandra Ng
- Cinematography: Chen Chuqiang
- Edited by: Lin An'er
- Music by: Huang Ailun
- Production companies: China Film Co., Ltd. August First Studio; Beijing Galloping Horse Media Co., Ltd; CCTV-6
- Distributed by: China Film Co., Ltd. Beijing Galloping Horse Media Co., Ltd
- Release date: February 10, 2013
- Running time: 105 minutes
- Country: China
- Language: Mandarin

Better and Better is a 2013 Chinese romantic comedy film directed by Zhang Yibai and Xie Dongshen and written by Xu Zhengchao, starring Aaron Kwok, Wang Baoqiang, Tong Dawei, Xu Jinglei, Jing Tian, and Sandra Ng. The film premiered in China on 10 February 2013.

== Cast ==
=== Main cast ===
- Aaron Kwok as Xie Defa
- Wang Baoqiang as Sun Guoshu
- Tong Dawei as Geng Zhi
- Xu Jinglei as Liu Shufen
- Jing Tian as Lian Sheng
- Sandra Ng as Yuan Fang

=== Guest appearances ===
- Tony Leung Ka-fai as Chef Zhou
- Zhang Yi as Geng Shanxi
- Wang Luodan as Zhou Yi'nan
- Ni Dahong as Grandpa Geng
- Kong Ng as Lao Gengtou
- Huang Jue as Xiang Cheng
- Zhang Ziyi as herself
- Karen Mok
- Annie Yi
- Christy Chung
- Hu Qiaohua
- Gao Qunshu
- Liu Yiwei
- Lam Suet
- Wu Mochou
- Liu Hua
- Max Mok
- Liu Zhibing
- Wang Zhifei
- Zhu Jun
- Zhou Tao
- Na Wei
- Pan Binlong
- Zhou Hong
- Bowie Lam
- Wang Peng
- Yue Hong
- Zhang Yishan

== Music ==
- Eason Chan - Happiness (《稳稳的幸福》)

== Critical response ==
The film received mixed reviews.
