= Li Muchen =

Chinese actress

- Simplified Chinese: 李沐宸
- Born: 17 August 1993 (age 32); Shanghai, China
- Occupation: Actress
- Years active: 2016–present

Li Muchen (Chinese: 李沐宸; born 17 August 1993) is a Chinese actress.

== Filmography ==
=== Television series ===
Year	English title	Chinese title	Role	Notes
2016		电竞纪元	Zhou Yiyang	
2017		我的仙界学院	Mo Xian	
2017	The Weasel Grave	鬼吹灯之黄皮子坟	Yanzi	
2018	Shall We Fall in Love	勇往直前恋上你	Chen Xinyue	
2019	Ashes Falling	何人生还	Na Lan	
2019	The King's Avatar	全职高手	Tang Rou	
2020	Novoland The Castle In the SkyII	九州·天空城II	Lian Yi	
2021	Rattan	司藤	Shen Yindeng	
2021	Young and Beautiful	我的漂亮朋友	Huahua	
2021	Please Feel At Ease Mr. Ling	一不小心捡到爱	Gu Xiner	
2022	The Oath of Love	余生，请多指教	Xiao Shan / San San	
2022	A Dream of Splendor	梦华录	Ge Zhaodi	
