= Ultra Reinforcement =

- Traditional Chinese: 超時空救兵
- Simplified Chinese: 超时空救兵
- Hanyu Pinyin: Chāo Shíkōng Jiùbīng
- Directed by: Lam Chi-chung
- Written by: Lam Chi-chung
- Produced by: Lu Zheng
- Starring: Wallace Huo; Jing Tian; Dylan Kuo; Cheung Tat-ming
- Edited by: Marco Mak
- Music by: Chen Zhe; Chen Ruoming
- Production companies: Beijing Starry Night Film and Television Culture Co., LTD
- Release date: January 24, 2012
- Running time: 90 minutes
- Country: China
- Language: Mandarin

Ultra Reinforcement is a 2012 Chinese historical romantic comedy film directed and written by Lam Chi-chung, starring Wallace Huo, Jing Tian, Dylan Kuo, and Cheung Tat-ming. The film was released in China on 24 January 2012.

== Cast ==
- Wallace Huo as Yang Zhi'ang, known by his nickname "Er Dan", a Chinese writer.
- Jing Tian as Princess Lingzhi, in the Tang dynasty.
- Dylan Kuo as Shi Kejin.
- Cheung Tat-ming as Shi Keyan.

=== Other ===
- Hao Hao as An Qi.
- Sun Hao as Yang Ao, a slayer.
- Lam Chi-chung as Li Bai/ Li Yifei.
- Lam Suet as the boss of a Publishing house.
- Tin Kai-Man as a mental patient.

== Release ==
The film had its premiere in Tianjin on 24 January 2012, during the Chinese New Year.
