= Special ID =

2013 film by Clarence Fok

- China poster
- Traditional Chinese: 特殊身份
- Simplified Chinese: 特殊身份
- Hanyu Pinyin: Tè Shū Shēn Fèn
- Jyutping: Dak6 Syu4 San1 Fan2
- Directed by: Clarence Fok
- Written by: Chan Tai-lee; Szeto Kam-Yuen
- Produced by: Donnie Yen; Peter Pau; Zhang Wang; Han Xiaoli
- Starring: Donnie Yen; Jing Tian; Andy On; Zhang Hanyu; Ronald Cheng; Collin Chou
- Cinematography: Peter Pau
- Edited by: Cheung Ka-fai
- Music by: Dou Peng
- Production companies: Starlit Film; China Film; China Movie Channel; Xi'an Suobao Film & TV Culture Communication; Xi'an Longnian Film & TV Culture Communication; Beijing Yuji Xinghai Advertising; Beijing Tianhuan International Culture Communication; Eastern New Vision Film & TV Culture
- Release date: October 18, 2013
- Running time: 99 minutes
- Countries: China; Hong Kong
- Languages: Cantonese; Mandarin; English
- Box office: US$29.1 million

Special ID is a 2013 crime action film directed by Clarence Fok, from a screenplay by Chan Tai-lee and Szeto Kam-Yuen. It stars Donnie Yen alongside Jing Tian, Andy On, Zhang Hanyu, Ronald Cheng, and Collin Chou. A Chinese-Hong Kong co-production, the film was released in both mainland China and Hong Kong on October 18, 2013.

== Plot ==
Yen takes on the role of Dragon Chan, a Hong Kong undercover police officer deep within the ranks of one of China's most ruthless underworld gangs. The leader of the gang, Hung (Collin Chou), has made it his priority to weed out the government infiltrators in his midst. Struggling to keep his family together and his identity concealed, Chan is torn between two worlds.

As Chan's undercover comrades are being dealt with one by one, Chan fears that his days are becoming numbered. Now, he must risk everything to take down the organization and reclaim the life he lost when he took on this perilous assignment. As the action mounts, Chan must do everything he can to protect the special identity he wishes he never had before it's too late.

== Cast ==
- Donnie Yen as Dragon Chan
- Jing Tian as Fang Jing
- Zhang Hanyu as Blade
- Ronald Cheng as Captain Cheung
- Collin Chou as Hung
- Paw Hee-ching as Sister Amy, Chan's mother
- Yang Zhigang as Captain Lei Peng
- Rain Lau as Mary
- Ken Lo as Brother Bao
- Frankie Ng as Mahjong player
- Qi Daji
- Terence Yin as Sunny's assistant
- Evergreen Mak Cheung-ching as Brother Kun
- Andy On as Sunny

== Critical response ==
At Metacritic, which assigns a rating out of 100 to reviews from mainstream critics, the film has received an average score of 46, based on 6 reviews indicating "mixed or average reviews".

Andrew Chan of the Film Critics Circle of Australia writes, "The good news is that 'Special ID' remains largely entertaining for most of the duration, but in many ways it remains a huge pile of mess."

== Accolades ==
Accolades
Ceremony	Category	Recipient	Outcome
33rd Hong Kong Film Awards	Best Action Choreography	Donnie Yen	Nominated
