= Pure Hearts: Into Chinese Showbiz =

- Poster for the film
- Traditional Chinese: 純潔心靈·逐夢演藝圈
- Simplified Chinese: 纯洁心灵·逐梦演艺圈
- Literal meaning: Pure Hearts: Chasing Showbiz Dreams
- Hanyu Pinyin: Chúnjié xīnlíng: zhú mèng yǎnyì quān
- Directed by: Bi Zhifei
- Written by: Bi Zhifei
- Produced by: Bi Zhifei; Ivy Yang
- Starring: Bi Zhifei; Li Yanman; Xin Zuoyu; Zhu Yiwen
- Cinematography: Sun Ligang
- Edited by: Bi Zhifei
- Music by: Bi Zhifei (theme)
- Release date: July 22, 2017
- Running time: 98 minutes
- Country: China
- Language: Mandarin
- Budget: CN¥25 million
- Box office: CN¥2,321,000

Pure Hearts: Into Chinese Showbiz (Chinese: 纯洁心灵·逐梦演艺圈), often shortened to Pure Hearts (纯洁心灵), is a 2017 Chinese film directed and produced by Bi Zhifei. The plot focuses on a teacher at an acting school trying to make a movie with his students and the difficulties that result from the dark side of the film industry and their personal struggles during production. Due to its troubled production, which involved accusations of overworking and mistreatment by Bi and claims that it took 12 years to make, and low ratings of the film itself after release despite praise by industry and government figures beforehand, it has been considered one of the worst Chinese films ever made, being panned by both critics and mainstream audiences for its acting, screenplay, direction, narrative structure, characters, themes, editing, and its theme song. In response, Bi sued Douban of discrimination against domestic films and even submitted the film to the Cannes Film Festival.

== Plot ==
The film is a conglomeration of stories of students at an acting school taught by Tianyang Wen. It opens on a beach where all of them introduce themselves to the camera. They are invited to each other's birthday parties.

Aiyi Feng is a traditional performer from the Li ethnic group. She feels romantically attracted to Tianyang despite the age difference.

Jiayue Wang and Chengfeng Leng hang out with rich older men in order to make money.

Huhu Zhao invites his classmate Li Ya on a date to the beach. Tianyang's girlfriend Ru Huang grows distant and breaks up with him. After Aiyi tries to approach him professionally, a much older director attempts to seduce Aiyi, leading her to give up her chance at acting. Jiayue and Chengfeng mock her for this. Chengfeng was adopted by a British man who didn't want her to get into acting.

Ye Cheng is a Singer at a nightclub. He finds an older woman with an estranged husband and begins a sexual relationship with her in exchange for money. With her connections he starts appearing in more commercials and shows. He also buys a car which allows him to get closer to his classmate, Jiayi Yang, who he actually likes. He dates Jiayi during the day while sleeping with the older woman at night, causing a moral dilemma.

The old director who Aiyi rejected is approached by Huhu and Li, only for him to tell them he doesn't need any male actors. Huhu gets his friends to prank him by dressing up as women and seducing him.

Xinning Tie and Xiaoyu He are roommates. Xiaoyu is helping an old lady evade a drunk bus driver and in the process is hit by a bus. His leg is amputated, ending his career as an actor. His mom and Tianyang advise him he can still write movie scripts and reviews.

Tianyang brings some of his girls to a script meeting but it ends poorly with them getting into an argument which escalates into a car chase which Tianyang has to save Aiyi from. Chengfeng tries to seduce a director into giving her a part in his movie but he refuses.

Li is told she is getting a part in a movie and is invited to a hotel room with the director to discuss logistics. Alone in the room, the director tries to rape her but Huhu runs in at the last minute and saves her. Both the director and Huhu are imprisoned because Huhu injured him as he was fighting back. Tianyang resigns from his position.

In a flashback scene, Xiaoyu begs for an acting job, and is put as a set worker. The person in charge lets him have a cameo, but then he is beat up by a gang. Tianyang goes to help him and is hospitalized himself. Ye gets back with Jiayi. Tianyang remarries and all his students attend the wedding. Xinning forms a long distance relationship with a woman in Beijing and travels every week to see her.

As graduation nears, the president of the Senior Artists Association (along with Chengfeng's adoptive father) pull together a meeting where they agree to finance and produce a film with all of Tianyang's students who they have heard good things about.

The group hosts another beach party to celebrate.

== Production ==
Bi Zhifei rose money for the film through crowdfunding as well as funding from his father-in-law and friends. During filming, he exercised complete creative control and took on many roles, leading to conflicts with crew members over working conditions and the film's direction. SNH48 was signed on to produce a song and music video for the film at a cost of CN¥2.8 million; however, he wanted the group Sunshine to record another version after noticing their internet fame, causing SNH48's agency to protest.
