= A Dream of Splendor =

2022 Chinese web series

- Promotional poster

Chinese name
- Traditional Chinese: 夢華錄
- Simplified Chinese: 梦华录
Transcriptions
Standard Mandarin
- Hanyu Pinyin: Mèng huá lù
- Genre: Historical fiction; Romance
- Based on: Zhao Pan'er Fengyue Jiu Feng Chen《赵盼儿风月救风尘 by Guan Hanqing
- Written by: Zhang Wei
- Directed by: Yang Yang
- Presented by: Sun Zhonghuai; Wang Yuren
- Starring: Liu Yifei; Chen Xiao; Liu Yan; Lin Yun; Xu Haiqiao; Dai Xu; Zhang Xiaoqian
- Country of origin: China
- Original language: Mandarin
- No. of episodes: 40 (30 in TVB version)

Production
- Executive producer: Zheng Wei
- Producer: Wu Zhuoqian
- Production locations: Hengdian; Xiangshan; Xiangyang; Wuxi
- Running time: 45 minutes (60 minutes in TVB version)
- Production company: Golden Pond Media

Original release
- Network: Tencent Video (China); WeTV (others); TVB (Hong Kong); Beijing Satellite Television
- Release: June 2 – July 24, 2022

A Dream of Splendor (simplified Chinese: 梦华录; traditional Chinese: 夢華錄; pinyin: Mèng huá lù) is a 2022 Chinese historical drama television series directed by Yang Yang and starring Liu Yifei, Chen Xiao, Liu Yan and Lin Yun. Set in the Northern Song dynasty, the series is based on the (Yuan Opera-style) drama Zhao Pan'er Fengyue Jiu Feng Chen《赵盼儿风月救风尘》 by the Yuan dynasty playwright Guan Hanqing. It is airing on Tencent Video and WeTV from June 2, 2022, to July 24, 2022. Hong Kong's TVB was the first television station to broadcast this drama on TVB Jade from September 5, 2022, to October 14, 2022, previously on its streaming service MyTV SUPER from June 9 to July 2, 2022. It later went on national broadcast and aired simultaneously on Beijing Satellite Television from 22 November 2022.

== Synopsis ==
Zhao Pan-Er is the owner of a famous tea shop in Qian-Tang. She supported her fiancé, Ou-Yang Xu, for three years before he went to Eastern Capital to take the imperial exam, promising to marry her once he passed.

She meets Gu Qian-Fan, an upright commander from the Imperial City, and they become entangled in a big case in Jiang-Nan where he is framed and becomes a wanted man. During that time, she finds out from Ou-Yang Xu's servant, Uncle De, that though her fiancé won third place in the imperial examination, he agreed to marry the daughter of an official, and can only take Zhao Pan-Er as a concubine instead of as his legal wife.

Unwilling to accept her fate, she decides to go to the Eastern Capital and find out the truth, and seek justice. Before going, Zhao Pan-Er, helps an injured Gu Qian-Fan escape the authorities by getting him onto a ship. She also finds out that her friend, Song Yin-Zhang, was tricked into marriage by a gambler who only wanted her money, and is being abused by him. Along the way, she finds Sun San-Niang, a chef who was driven to suicide by her callous, cheating husband and ungrateful son, clinging to a large piece of driftwood. Sun San-Niang is rescued by Gu Qian-Fan. Sun San-Niang becomes ill from overwhelming grief and is nursed back to health by Zhao Pan-Er and Gu Qian-Fan. Zhao Pan-Er comes up with a plan to rescue Song Yin-Zhang and get justice for her. After successfully saving Song Yin-Zhang, the three sworn sisters decide to go to the Eastern Capital together to find the truth about Ou-Yang Xu.

When Zhao Pan-Er arrives in the Eastern Capital, she finds out what Uncle De said is true. She confronts Ou-Yang Xu, and he confirms his plans to marry Gao Hui. He again asks her to be his concubine, but she refuses and asks him to return the things she gave him, including a damning painting sought after by several court officials. He is unable to comply, and, convinced by Uncle De that she would be detrimental to his career, frames her for a violation, and has her driven out of the Capital in shame with her friends.

When Zhao Pan-Er encounters Gu Qian-Fan at the capital gates, he convinces her to stay in the Eastern Capital after he hears what Ou-Yang Xu did, and has the trumped-up violation revoked. In order to remain in the Eastern Capital, Zhao Pan-Er, Song Yin-Zhang and Sun San-Niang pool their funds and start a small teahouse in an undesirable area. But after several of Pan-Er's innovative ideas challenge the status quo, the teahouse becomes a success. They then decide to start up a restaurant in the Eastern Capital. In the beginning, they encounter issues with the restaurant guild, but are eventually able to create a successful restaurant catering to all kinds of customers. The three sworn sisters experience a lot of hardship and obstacles, but are finally able to find success and happiness. Their restaurant becomes a place where entertainers can work and make a decent living. With the help of the emperor, Zhao Pan-Er is able to have the pariah status and restrictions removed. 9

== Broadcast time ==
Channel	Location	Broadcast Date	Broadcast Time	Remarks
Tencent Video	Mainland China	June 2, 2022 – June 26, 2022	20:00	VIP members will update 8 episodes for the first time Update 4 consecutively in the first week Daily; Update 2 episodes every Thursday to Saturday; Update 2 episodes for the first time for non-VIP members Update 1 episode every Thursday to Monday
WeTV	Overseas	June 2, 2022 – July 3, 2022	20:00	
myTV SUPER	Hong Kong	June 9, 2022 – July 2, 2022	20:00	
Netflix	Overseas	July 1, 2022 – July 24, 2022		
Astro GO	Malaysia	June 8, 2022 – July 22, 2022	20:00	Update 1 episode every Monday to Friday
Jade	Hong Kong	September 5, 2022 – October 14, 2022	20:30	Dubbed in Cantonese; Reduced to 30 episodes.
Jade	TVB Anywhere service area (only in Singapore)	September 5, 2022 – October 14, 2022	20:30	Dubbed in Cantonese; Reduced to 30 episodes.
Beijing Satellite TV	Mainland China	November 22, 2022-	19:30	Quality Theater

== Caste System ==
An unusual aspect of this series is that it explicitly addresses and explores the caste system of the Northern Song dynasty. Caste systems existed in China, though they are not as famous or rigid as the ones in India and Edo period Japan. Broadly speaking, the general citizenry were classed as either "Dastardly" or "Virtuous" based on their profession and ancestry, with a complex system of sub-castes within these two broad classifications. "Dastardly" citizens were restricted in various ways, had fewer civil rights, and were ineligible for imperial examinations and public office. It was not explicitly illegal for women from a "dastardly" background to become the main wife of an official, but it was severely frowned upon and considered to be a mark of poor character.

"Dastardly" professions in this series include merchants, businessmen, and "entertainers", a category which includes the sub-castes of instrument players, singers, dancers, and prostitutes. Scholars have always been highly regarded throughout Chinese history, so of course, they are considered "Virtuous".

Zhao Pan'er's father was a general who violated military orders in order to save citizens from slaughter. As part of his punishment, his family were demoted to "sinners" and Zhao Pan'er was trained as a government-regulated "entertainer". She was later "ransomed/redeemed" by her father's comrades and regained her freedom, but her time as a "sinner" would forever be regarded as a blemish to her reputation if it was ever found out. After being "ransomed/redeemed", Zhao Pan'er opened a tea shop and became a business owner.

Zhao Pan'er's background as a business owner and former sinner was the primary motivation behind Ouyang Xu concealing his relationship with her and later on, reneging on marrying her as his main wife, the inciting incident which sets the story in motion. The Empress was also a former entertainer, and her attempts to protect her identity, and her schemes against those who criticize her for being unworthy of her position, all play key roles in the story.

Song Yinzhang, a talented Pipa player, also struggles with her identity as an "entertainer" of the "dastardly" caste.

== Cast ==
=== Main cast ===
Actor	Role	Introduction	Cantonese Dubbing (TVB)
Liu Yifei	Zhao Pan'Er	Astute, sharp & independent businesswoman. She is introduced, in the beginning, as the proprietress of a tea shop by the Qiantang River. Both beautiful and brilliant, anyone who sees her can't help but call her stunning. Born as the daughter of an official, because of her father's unfortunate crimes, her family was forced to relinquish their status as an official, and she was sold off to a brothel to be a lowly entertainer/performer at a very young age. Throughout her time as a performer, she only displayed her talent, but did not sell herself. Afterwards, her father's former ministry subordinates begged, on her behalf, for forgiveness, they managed to change her status to a commoner, but she felt her time as a performer would always her greatest shame and embarrassment. After Cong-Liang, she made a living running a tea shop by the Qian-Tang River and, in the Eastern Capital, she met up with her fiancé Ou-Yang Xu, but Ou-Yang Xu was favored by the Gao family and engaged to Gao Hui after Ji-Ji. He regretted breaking his marriage contract to Zhao Pan'Er, but explained, because of her status, his career would suffer. He needed to marry a noble lady to advance his career. Even though, he loved her, he couldn't marry her as promised, so he proposed to accept her as a concubine instead, which was rejected by her. When she first met Gu Qian-Fan, they had some misunderstandings due to unfortunate circumstances. Later on, when Gu Qian-Fan was framed for a crime he didn't commit & had to escape Qian-Tang, Pan-Er helped the injured Qian-Fan escape. Qian-Fan, in turn, helped her out of difficult situations many times. Eventually, she and Gu Qian-Fan, fell in love and he proposed to her. Unfortunately, there were still a lot of misunderstandings in their relationship & Pan-Er thought, at one time, Qian-Fan abandoned her like Ou-Yang Xu after getting a promotion to Commissioner of Capital Security Office. Not realizing, Gu Qian-Fan really didn't know how to face her after he discovered what had happened to her father.	Zhang Songxin
Chen Xiao (Childhood: Ziyi)	Gu Qian-Fan (Childhood: Wei Hui'e)	Commander of the Intelligence Office Agency of the Capital Security Office, also known as the "Living King of Hell (Yama)". He was born as a noble son of Prime Minister Xiao Qin-Yan, who later abandoned Qian-Fan's mother and him for an official career, so he changed his surname to his mother's surname, Gu. He is both civil and military official, upright and righteous, and takes upholding justice as his sworn duty. He shows no mercy to the prisoners sent to the Imperial City Division. He is cold-blooded and ruthless during interrogations, and because he has no mercy when seeking the truth, he is called, the "Living Yama". He met Zhao Pan'Er while on his way to his assigned mission. Even though she was a woman, he would show no sympathy for, but the two got to know each other better in crisis after crisis. He, reluctantly, let go of his perseverance and strength because of Zhao Pan'Er's beautiful face, independence, intelligence, strength, and character. He gradually, developed deep roots of love for her. He was promoted to the post of deputy commissioner of the Capital Security Office after solving the case in Qian-Tang. He was, later, promoted to be a 5th ranked official title of Commissioner of Capital Security Office of the imperial city after the hat demon case. He hoped with this promotion, he could give his mother a posthumous title & be buried with honors.	
Liu Yan	Sun San-Niang	Zhao Pan-Er's neighbor in Qian-Tang. Born as a butcher, she has great strength, excellent cooking skills, especially good with Jiang-Nan dishes and desserts. She has known Zhao Pan'Er for a long time and talks about everything. She is a virtuous woman and worked hard to give her husband and son everything. She discovers her husband is having an affair with a widow, her cousin, and her only son did not even recognize her as his mother. In despair, she jumps into the river and tries to commit suicide. She is saved by Gu Qian-Fan and Zhao Pan-Er. She opens a tea shop in the Eastern Capital with Zhao Pan-Er and Song Yin-Zhang. At first, Du Chang-Feng, a good friend of Ou-Yang Xu & a presented scholar, could not understand why Zhao Pan-Er didn't accept Ou-Yang Xu's proposal and tried to persuade her to be Ou-Yang Xu's concubine. Later, when Du Chang-Feng was bullied by his students as usual, because of his poor eyesight, Sun San-Niang stood up for him. Du Chang-Feng and Sun San-Niang soon became friends. San-Niang helped cure Chang-Feng poor eyesight with pig liver. To repay San-Niang for her kindness, he went out of his way to help her and her friends. They gradually got together and fell in love. Finally, he asked the emperor to allow them to be married which was granted.	Liu Huiyun
Lin Yun	Song Yin-Zhang	Highly accomplished pipa musician. Her pipa skill is considered the best in the Jiang-Nan region. The pipa she plays is called Gu-Yue. Although she is an official Jiao-Fang music performer, she does not sell herself as a performer. She, together with Zhao Pan'er and Sun San-Niang, swore themselves as sisters. In the early years, she is shown to be naive and confident personality, which always makes Zhao Pan-Er and Sun San-Niang worry. Sparing no effort to get out of 贱书, she doesn't use good judgment to get out of the county. Regardless of Zhao Pan-Er's advice, she elopes with Zhou She, who is a gambler and indecent man with cruel intentions. She is imprisoned and beaten by Zhou She, and her savings are all stolen. Later, she had a crush on Gu Qian-Fan, but after learning Gu Qian-Fan's sweetheart is Zhao Pan-Er, she becomes buried in the darkness, heartbroken and angry. She agrees to let Shen Ru-Zhuo's pursue her, but once again entrusts herself to someone immoral. After exposing Shen Ru-Zhuo's true face of charming beautiful young ladies for his boss, Minister Lin, to have an affair with, she completely sees through the false love between them. She realizes, overnight, she needs to grows up, not be impetuous & take charge of her life & the responsibilities that come with it.	Ling Xi

=== Other cast ===
Actor	Role	Introduction	Cantonese Dubbing (TVB)
Xu Haiqiao	Ou-Yang Xu	Zhao Pan-Er's former betrothed. In the past, he failed the imperial exam repeatedly. He met and received the kindness of Zhao Pan-Er who paid for his education and provided room and board. They fell in love and made a marriage contract. Finally, he passed the imperial examination, three years later, and was awarded third place Presented scholar. Later, for the sake of his official career, he accepted the love of Gao Hui, the daughter of the powerful minister Gao Hu, and broke the marriage contract with Zhao Pan-Er, instead offering her to be his concubine. He also thought he was keeping her safe from Gao Hui jealousy because women who showed interest in him were having unfortunate accidents, not realizing it was her nanny causing them. After that, when Zhao Pan-Er wanted compensation for him breaking the marriage contract, he and his housekeeper connived with the local officer to slander Zhao Pan-Er and her friends and had expelled them from the Eastern Capital. Later, he found out Zhao Pan-Er came back into the Eastern Capital with the help of Gu Qian-Fan. In order to avoid being retaliated against by Zhao Pan-Er in the Eastern Capital, he flattered the emperor with his knowledge of Taoism when he was presented at the palace and was awarded the post of Deputy Envoy of Zuo Lang Zi-Ji Palace, with the mission to find the famous Taoist priest, Bao-Yi, and escaped to Xi-Jing. However, he was despised by Minister Gao Hu because of this, so the marriage contract with Gao Hui was broken. He went to Xi-Jing to take office, suffering hardships getting there, and having difficulty finding Bao-Yi. When he arrived in Xi-Jing, he was despised by the people there, thinking he was being punished due to the post he was assigned. Minister Gao sent his men to Xi-Jing to have him sign a document to officially break the marriage contract with his daughter. He secretly vowing to return triumphantly in the near future and take revenge against Zhao Pan-Er and Gao Hui. He, finally, returned to the Eastern Capital with revenge in his heart and colluded with Qi Mu to bring down the Empress which failed. He killed Uncle De for disobeying him and tried to kill Zhao Pan-Er, but failed. He, then, colluded with the Empress which also failed, due to the Empress' change of heart. He was finally captured by the emperor and handed over to the Capital Security Office with full authority to prosecute & punish him.	
Dai Xu	Chi Pan	Head of 12 merchant guilds. A well-known playboy in the Eastern Capital, born into a family of merchants, known as Chi Ya Nei. He is rich & gullible and, at times, was cheated on by merchants, when he thought he bought things of value. He and Zhang Hao-Hao were a good friend and he supported her. He was, often, at odds with Zhao Pan-Er and had a long-standing quarrel with Gu Qian-Fan. He breaks up with Zhang Hao-Hao, because she tells him off about the gift of a bird he was trying to give her. Later, he was helped by Zhao Pan-Er, by chance, when a local officer was bullying him about the bad condition of the wharf following a terrible storm, and because of his status. A different kind of relationship between them arose, but because Zhao Pan-Er had already given her own heart to Gu Qian-Fan. He later turns his attentions to Song Yin-Zhang.	Zhong Jianlin
Zhang Xiaoqian	Du Chang-Feng	Close friend of Ou-Yang Xu & academy scholar/teacher. He was born into a wealthy family in the capital, with outdated and pedantic thinking. Both of his parents died when he was young. Suffering from night blindness and severe myopia, resulting in blurred vision. To see close objects, he needs to relied on 叆叇 (similar to today's myopia glasses). In the beginning, he tried to persuade Zhao Pan-Er to commit herself, because of her status, to Ou-Yang Xu as a concubine, but Sun San-Niang threw him into the river water in public in a rage. Without knowing, the tea house, he was enjoying because of the unique tea and Song Yin-Zhang's pipa playing, was opened by Zhao Pan-Er and Sun San-Niang, he was thrown out by San-Niang, but, later, he became a regular customer. He and Sun San-Niang were enemies, in the beginning. One day, when San-Niang was hit by a pebble meant for him by his students, she defended him and scolded the students for being disrespectful to their teacher who is a Presented scholar and the students should be grateful they could study with him and not to make fun of him because he's blind. She also made sure the academy administration acknowledged him as well. Chang-Feng was so touched when San-Niang defended him, because no one ever did, he instantly wanted to be friends with her. He helped her and her friends as best he could. Even offering his family heirlooms to help them when they were in need of money. Eventually, he fell in love with her and wanted to marry her even though she was divorced and had a son. After Ou-Yang Xu made a big mistake, he tried to persuade him to surrender, but to no avail. Finally, he was rewarded by the emperor to be able to marry Sun San-Niang.	Huang Qichang
Guan Yunpeng	Chen Lian	Gu Qian-Fan's right-hand man. At first he worked in Ship Department, and later transferred to the Capital Security Office. He is shrewd and observant, and he is sophisticated in dealing with things. When Gu Qian-Fan was in distress at the beginning, he was threatened and had no choice but to compromise. Later, he learned that Gu Qian-Fan was working in the Imperial City Division and decided to follow him. Under the guidance of Gu Qian-Fan, he took care of Zhao Pan-Er, Sun San-Niang, and Song Yin-Zhang. He became their friends and defender. The three of them also treated Chen Lian as a younger brother. In the beginning, he and Ge Zhao-Di were enemies, but became friends after she was taken in by Zhao Pan-Er, gradually, he fell in love with her.	Hu Jiahao
Li Muchen	Ge Zhao-Di	Head waitress of Zhao Pan-Er's teahouse, and later restaurant. Instigated by Gao Hui's Nanny, she went to the teahouse with her accomplice to frame Zhao Pan-Er and her friends for food poisoning but their ploys and actions ended up being exposed. Afterward, she changed her ways, turned enemies into friends with Zhao Pan-Er and her friends, and waited in the teahouse & later, part owner of their restaurant. She and Chen Lian were enemies at the beginning but, later, she fell in love with him.	Ye Xiaoxin
Kana	Zhang Hao-Hao	Eastern Capital's No. 1 Entertainer and best singer. Her eyebrows are picturesque, and she smiles sweetly. Performing, but not selling herself. She is conceited of her talent and beauty, unwilling to be inferior to others, thinking even if one is a lowly citizen, one should live in one's own world. In the beginning, he made good friends with Zhao Pan-Er, Song Yin-Zhang, and others. Later, Yin-Zhang unwillingly became famous for her pipa playing, and she was secretly jealous of her, but later reconciled, and warned Yin-Zhang of Shen Ru-Zhuo's true colors. Chi Pan was originally a good friend who lived and supported her, but later the two broke up.	Zhan Jianer
Sun Zujun	Shen Ru-Zhuo	Born in a famous family in the capital, the son of Shen Ming, who was reviewed by the Yi-Li Bureau, on the surface is an official son who is obsessed with music, singing, dancing, romantic, and playing with the world. He seemed to love Song Yin-Zhang very much, but in fact, he wants to use her beauty to win the support of officials for himself, so as to maintain the dignity of the Shen family in the Eastern Capital. He attempted to pawn Song Yin-Zhang off to a court official, but Song Yin-Zhang saw through it and retaliated against him.	Huang Jiquan
Wang Luoyong	Xiao Qin-Yan	Gu Qian-Fan's biological father, Suzhou's Zhizhou, Pingjiang Army military governor, post-official prime minister. Has the most prominent and powerful position of his life, he used deep scheming and unscrupulous means to achieve his goals, is the head of the famous treacherous ministers in the court. When he was from a poor family, he was in love with Gu Shu-Niang, Qian-Fan's mother, they married and she gave birth to Gu Qian-Fan. He grew up with both civil and military skills. Later, in pursuit of a career in the government, he abandoned his wife and son, which he, eventually, regretted. In contrast to his other 3 sons who are far behind him in achievements, he greatly admired Gu Qian-Fan's successes. He intends to have Gu Qian-Fan take charge of the Xiao family and inherit the mantle.	Zhao Shiliang
Baojianfeng	Emperor	Believes in Taoism and Taoist magic. He meets with Ou-Yang Xu and the other Jin-Shi's and asks them about their daily hobby time. Ou-Yang Xu loved to study Huang Lao's art. He awards him the post of Deputy Envoy of Zuo Lang Zi-Ji Palace and was ordered to go to Xi-Jing to ask a fairy master, Bao-Yi, to come out of the mountain. He has a strong relationship with his queen. He is aware of her past, loves her and will do anything to protect her.	Zhai Yaohui
Liu Kejun	Liu Wan	Empress, from humble beginnings. Is devoted and loves the emperor, but is aware she needs to set up connections to keep herself safe, because the emperor will not always be around to protect her.	Zeng Xiuqing
Jia Ze	Gao Hui	Gao Hu's only daughter. A pure and kind-hearted lady who is loved by thousands of people, she fell in love with Ou-Yang Xu and firmly refused her father's request to break up her marriage after he was appointed to Xi-Jing. Zhao Pan-Er told her, she had a marriage contract with Ou-Yang Xu which he broke and two people sent by her family, came to her teahouse to frame her for a murder, so she would be thrown in prison, then executed. Pan-Er advised her to send someone to investigate Ou-Yang Xu's past and the incident at the teahouse before accepting the truth. She found out her nanny had been sending people to harm anyone who showed any interest in Ou-Yang Xu, she relented and became friends with Zhao Pan-Er.	Huang Xinyu
Li Shengjia	Xiao Wei	Gu Qian-Fan's half-brother.	Zhang Fangzheng
Lu Yong	Ke Zheng	Former prime minister. Was demoted and posted to another province. During Xiao Jin-Yan's birthday banquet, he bestowed the inscription on the pipa played by Song Yin-Zhang with the word "strength of character" after admiring Song Yin-Zhang's superb performance during the banquet.	
Yao Anlian	Qi Mu	The official worships Yu-Shi Zhong-Cheng. Because of his rivalry with Xiao Qin-Yan and jealousy of his trust by the court officials, he deliberately tried to frame and assassinate him. He even used Gu Qian-Fan as his own pawn, into instigating him against Xiao Qin-Yan, so they will turn against each other. He regarded himself as Qing-Liu. After Gu Qian-Fan formally drew a line with him, he gradually revealed his true colors. After the final defeat, he was sentenced to exile.	Li Jinlun
Du Yuming	Lei Jing	Imperial City Envoy. Afraid Gu Qian-Fan's abilities would threaten his status, he often tried to have killed Gu Qian-Fan. Xiao Qin-Yan came forward to mediate and because of his power, he had no choice but to give in.	Lin Guoxiong
Gao Changyuan	Yu Zhong-Quan	Lei Jing's confidant. Jealous of Gu Qian-Fan's abilities and at odds with him. He tries to restrain Gu Qian-Fan and frame Zhao Pan-Er but failed. He was, later, found to be in collusion with foreigners in Xi-Xia, and had embezzled Lei Jing's family property.	Chen Yaonan
Chen Zhen	Zheng Qian-Tang	Magistrate of Qian-Tang County. He secretly defied the sea ban for private gains, colluded with Lei Jing to discredit and kill Gu Qian-Fan. He was later given the choice of death or a family member would die for each hour he takes after the deadline passes by Xiao Qin-Yan.	Thunder
Yin Zhusheng	Gao Hu	Imperial Inspector, Gao Hui's father, originally Ou-Yang Xu's future father-in-law. A proud official, good at judging the current situation. He likes to collect famous paintings. After Ou-Yang Xu's Imperial exam results are published, he caught his prospective son-in-law at the top of the list, thinking since he came from a poor family, he could be easily controlled. Later, when he learned that Ou-Yang Xu was appointed as a palace official to Xi-Jing, he angrily tore up the marriage contract. She once coveted Zhao Pan-Er's beauty and intelligence, and wanted to take her as a concubine and tried to molest her.	Pan Wenbo
Zhu Hui	Uncle De	Ou-Yang Xu's housekeeper. He likes to worship high and step down, often violating Ou-Yang Xu's requests and making his own decisions. He hates Zhao Pan-Er, because of her status, thinks she is a gold digger and not good enough for his young master . In the end, he was killed by Ou-Yang Xu, because he didn't want his young master to sell the family's asset.	Ye Zhensheng
Hu Yuxuan	He Si	The follower of Chi Ya Nei, he is good friends with Zhao Pan-Er and Sun San-Niang.	Liu Yixi
Zhang Xiang	Zhou She	Qian-Tang businessman. See profits and forgets righteousness, good at flattery and loves to gambling. At first, he tricked Song Yin-Zhang into marrying him. After getting married, he showed his true face and gambling nature. In order to force Song Yin-Zhang to give him her savings, he was imprisoned her in his house. He chained her to a tree like a dog, beat and kicked her, until she gave him all her money. Zhao Pan-Er found out about what happened to Song Yin-Zhang and devised a plan to get back at Zhou She. On discovering he was tricked, he tried to have Song Yin-Zhang and Zhao Pan-Er arrested, instead with the help of Gu Qian-Fan, he was flogged, detained in a prison and later sentenced to exile.	Deng Zhijian
Liu Yajin	Yuan Tun-Tian	A frequent visitor with a half-hidden face.	Li Jinlun
Guo Jinjie	Fu Xin-Gui	Sun San-Niang's husband. He divorced his wife and married her cousin-in-law.	No dialogue
Han Yuanqi	Fu Zi-Fang	Son of Sun San-Niang, is ignorant. In the beginning, because he was dissatisfied with Sun San-Niang's teaching, he followed Fu Xin-Gui and his step-mother. Later, because he was dissatisfied with Fu Xin-Gui and his step-mother, he traveled thousands of miles to Beijing to follow Sun San-Niang and Du Chang-Feng.	Luo Kongrou
Yu Menghan	Silver Vase	Song Yin-Zhang's personal maid.	Cheng Yaoyu
Liu Wei	Mr. Zhuo-Shi	A frequent visitor with half-hidden face.	Ye Zhensheng
Chen Xuming	Xu Zhizhou	Xiuzhou Zhizhou.	Lu Guoquan
Zhang Liqiu	Jiang family	Gao Hui's nanny.	Rebina
Li Xingmei	Su Niang	Pipa musician. She was hired to play the pipa at a teahouse in Cha-Tang Lane in competition with Song Yin-Zhang. She was called by Zhao Pan-Er to listen to Song Yin-Zhang playing the pipa. She was very impressed by Yin-Zhang's skills and wanted to became an apprentice to Song Yin-Zhang.	He Luyi

== Song ==
=== Original soundtrack ===
No.	Title	Lyrics	Music	Lead singer	Length
1.	"Don't Regret the Time" (不惜时光)	Jiang Ke, Dai Yuedong, Yan Liyan	Feng Bo	Jane Zhang	4:24
2.	"A Dream of Splendor" (梦华)	Dai Yuedong, Yan Liyan	Dai Yuedong	Liu Yuning	3:37
3.	"What Year is This Eve" (今夕是何年)	Dai Yuedong, Cen Siyuan	Dai Yuedong	Sunnee	3:22
4.	"The Red Apricot Branches in the Spring" (红杏枝头春意闹)	Zhang Wei	Lu Liang, Dai Yuedong	Yin Lin	3:43
5.	"Read" (念念)	Dai Yuedong, Yan Liyan	Dai Yuedong	Kiki Wei	3:35

=== Hong Kong TVB version's Soundtrack ===
Lead singer	Song	Composer	Written lyrics	Arrangement	Supervisor
Hana Kuk	I am like before (theme song)	Lau Yi-shing	Hayes Yeung	Lau Yi-shing	Lau Yi-shing
Sherman Poon	When the Tomorrow Starts (end song)	Tam Yu-sun	Hayes Yeung	Freddie Lo	Lau Yi-shing

== Awards ==
- 2022 The 13th Macao International Television Festival|The 13th Macao International Television Festival Best Actress in "Golden Lotus": Liu Yifei.

== International broadcast ==
Country	Channel	Date	Time slot	Notes
Hong Kong	Jade	September 5, 2022 - October 14, 2022	Monday to Friday 20:30-21:30	Dubbed in Cantonese. Reduced to 30 episodes with 60 minutes per episode.
