= Rattan (Chinese TV series) =

- Also known as: Si Teng
- Genre: Fantasy; Romance; Suspence; Mystery
- Based on: "Half-Demon Rattan" (半妖司藤) by Wei Yu
- Screenplay by: Li Min; Wang Hong
- Directed by: Li Muge
- Starring: Jing Tian; Zhang Binbin; Li Muchen; Zhang Yichi
- Opening theme: "A Thousand Bravery" by Jing Tian
- Ending theme: "Meteorite" by Mian Zi (eps. 1–15) "Originally Able To" by Liu Yuning (eps. 16–30)
- Country of origin: China
- Original language: Mandarin
- No. of seasons: 1
- No. of episodes: 30+1 special

Production
- Executive producer: Xie Ying
- Producers: Jia Shikai; Wu Xingyan
- Production locations: Fengxian District; Shangri-La City; Wuxi; Hengdian World Studios
- Editor: Feng Chen
- Running time: 45 minutes
- Production companies: Shanghai Yuanji Painting Culture Co., Ltd. Shanghai Chaitou Phoenix Film Co., Ltd. Yuekai Film & Television, JoyTime

Original release
- Network: Youku; WeTV iQIYI
- Release: March 8 – April 4, 2021

Rattan (Chinese: 司藤; pinyin: Sī téng) is a 2021 Chinese television series based on the web novel with the same title by Wei Yu. Directed by Li Muge, it stars Jing Tian and Zhang Binbin. It aired in Youku, WeTV, and iQIYI from 8 March 2021 until 4 April 2021 every Sundays, Mondays, Tuesdays, and Wednesdays at 20:00 for 30 episodes. It started production since 2020. |- |}

== Plot ==
This is the series about a Designer named Qin Fang who accidentally fell into a cliff during his journey to find roots and wake up the plant-alien descendant Si Teng who has been sleeping for decades.

Many years ago, the plant-alien hybrid Si Teng (played by Jing Tian) was hunted down by a Xuanmen hunter. Chased across Shanghai, Si Teng fled for her life but escaping the relentless hunter proved impossible. In an act of cruel piety, the hunter killed Si Teng and buried her remains at the base of a great cliff. There she would have remained for all eternity, had fate not chosen to intervene. Resurrected by the unwitting actions of a young architect named Qin Fang (played by Zhang Binbin), Si Teng finds herself in a strange new world.

Confused by the fragmented memories in her head, Si Teng insists Qin Fang help her regain her memories, while at the same time helping her understand life in this modern age. Despite their rocky start, Qin Fang eventually agrees to Si Teng's demands. With Qin Fang by her side, Si Teng learns what it means to live and love but the fragmented memories of her past continue to torment her. Determined to understand the mysteries of her past, they continue to search for answers, their quest drawing them ever closer. How long will their happiness last when the demon of the past refuses to die?

== Cast ==
=== Main ===
- Jing Tian as Si Teng
  - Chen Zhiyan as Xi Zhu / young Si Teng
  - A plant-alien who came from the Tribe of Yi and has been sleeping since a long time ago, but later resurrected by Qin Fang's blood. She is Qiu Shan's disciple and forcibly changed by him with a meteorite.
  - Xi Zhu: a person who change her life at the expense of her life by Si Teng's forced in order to see Qin Fang again after death. This is a thought left by Si Teng to Qin Fang.
- Zhang Binbin as Qin Fang
  - A nowadays Designer who resurrects Si Teng by accidentally falling into a cliff and bleeding. He then becomes her servant and later find Bai Ying with her while knowing that she was originally a descendant of the Sky Tree. By the time goes, he gradually fell in love with her.
- Li Muchen as Shen Yindeng / Chisan / Yin
  - A member of Tribe of Yi who hides her real identity to join the Xuan Sect and took revenge to Si Teng.
- Zhang Yichi as Yan Furui
  - Xuan Sect descendant of the Xingyun Pavilion and a master to Yan Wafang who has been raised him from child.

=== Supporting ===
- Jin Zehao as Shan Zhigang / young Qiu Shan
  - Best friend and confidant of Qin Fang whom his real identity is that Qiu Shan.
- Pan Yiyi as An Man / An Xiaoting
  - Qin Fang's ex-girlfriend whom her real name is An Xiaoting.
- Zhang Dinghan as Jia Guizhi
  - Descendant of Jia San who lived in Dana.
- Lü Xing as Zhao Jianglong / Boss Ma
  - A man who met An Man and Qin Fang in Dana.
- Wang Guan as Zhou Wandong
  - A person who is looking for the "Nine-Eyed Dzi Bead" on Zhao Jianglong with meet An Man, but then abducts and abandon her.
- Shi Yueling as Kong Jinghua
  - A member of the Tribe of Yi who adopted Xi Zhu.
- Shao Feng as old Qiu Shan
  - Because since young was betrayed by the Xuan Sect, he then regards all of them as enemies while used meteorites to forcibly transform and grow Si Teng and was prevented from entering the Xuan sect. In order to kill Si Teng, he used the meteorite ability to live more than 80 years.

=== Others ===
- Fan Shide as Cang Hong, master of Wang Qiankun
- Guo Hexuan as Yan Wafang
  - Apprentice of Yan Furui who was once captured by Chisan to replenish his strength, bu then rescued by Si Teng.
- Li Muge as Bai Jin
  - A member of the Xuan Sect which often called as "Bai, the Great Careless" (白大忽悠).
- Jiang Ke as Ding Dacheng, member of the Xuan Sect.
- Liu Zhen as Ma Qiuyang, member of the Xuan Sect.
- Yang Chouchan as Pan Qinian, member of the Xuan Sect.
- Yu Yuan as Qi Ge (Brother Qi)
  - One of some men which An Man met in Dana who is looking for the "Nine-Eyed Dzi Bead" on Zhao Jianglong.
- Chang Rui as Secretary Bai
  - A secretary at Qin Fang's company who saved Qiu Shan's life.
- Na Jima as Chen Wan
  - Qin Fang's first love who died by the young Qiu Shan (Shan Zhigang) seven years ago in the series. Shen Yindeng used her to deceived Qin Fang by turning into Chen Wan's appearance with using illusions.
- Shen Shenglong as Yang Bo
  - Yin's husband thought he could help Chisan to resurrect, then died with Shen Yindeng.
- Wang Han as Shao Qing, Shao Yankuan's descendant.
- Fan Jinlun as Qin Laifu, Qin Fang's great-grandfather.
- Wang Xinfeng as Jia San
  - A rickshaw driver witnessed Si Teng being killed by Bai Ying who was then ordered by Bai Ying to guard Si Teng's body for generations.
- Shi Rui as Jia Lingling, Yan Furui's wife.
- Wang Tongyu as Chang Sheng, member of the Tribe of Yi who deceived Qiu Shan, causing Qiu Shan hates the Tribe of Yi.
- Ma Li as Lin Juan, Xi Zhu's kindergarten teacher.
- Gong Fan as Yi Ru, One of Kong Jinghua's adopted daughter and a friend of Qin Fang.
- Tian Genzheng as Mr. Xing, a family who adopted Xi Zhu in the special episode (31).
- Zhang Hui as Mrs. Xing, a family who adopted Xi Zhu in the special episode (31).
- Yu Chun as Mr. Wan
- Liu Jia as Mrs. Wan, a person whom Si Teng mistakenly thought that Bai Ying was possessed by her.
- Jiang Jinxu as Wan Jia's little daughter
  - Bai Ying was attached to her after being resurrected.
- Cheng Jiaguang as Huang Cuilan

=== Special appearance ===
- Wu Junyu as Wang Qiankun
  - Disciple of Cang Hong and a member of the Xuan Sect. He is also a friend to Yan Furui.
- Li Yixiao as Bai Ying
  - Another personality of Si Teng who killed her after splitting up her body. Knowing that she will be killed by the Xuan Sect, she then destroyed Qiu Shan with Si Teng and alongside Qiu Shan, they were wiped out in ashes.
- Yuan Chengjie as Shao Yankuan
  - A man who pursued Si Teng in the past, but was found to be unscrupulous and rejected by her. He then married Bai Ying with Qiu Shan's help and killed her when she was very weakest during the childbirth.

== Original soundtrack ==
Rattan OST (司藤 电视原声大碟)
| No. | Title | Lyrics | Music | Singer | Length |
|---|---|---|---|---|---|
| 1. | "A Thousand Bravery (千萬勇敢)" (Theme song) | Zhao Dengkai | Zhao Dengkai | Jing Tian |
| 2. | "Meteorite (星隕)" (Ending theme eps. 1–15) | Jiao Dong | Du Xingying | Jin Zi |
| 3. | "Originally Able To (本可以)" (Ending theme eps. 16–30) | Li Yang | Chen Yongtao | Liu Yuning |
| 4. | "Promise Me (答應我)" (Man Ver.) | Zhou Pin | Feng Da | Zhou Pin |
| 5. | "Promise Me (答應我)" (Woman Ver.) | Zhou Pin | Feng Da | Xie Danni |
| 6. | "Wonderful Surprise" (Male single) | Xu Mengya | Feng Da | Zhang Binbin |
| 7. | "Wonderful Surprise" (Male&Female duet) | Xu Mengya, Ri An | Feng Da | Yu Jiaoyan and Xie Danni |
| 8. | "Shimmering and Slightly Cool (微光微涼)" | Li Yufei | Feng Da | Ye Li |
| 9. | "A Thousand Bravery (千萬勇敢)" | Zhao Dengkai | Zhao Dengkai | Jeffrey Tung |
| 10. | "A Thousand Bravery (千萬勇敢)" (Singer-songwriter) | Zhao Dengkai | Zhao Dengkai | Zhao Dengkai |
| 11. | "Never Fall Never Clear (下落不明)" | Li Yang | Chen Yongtao | Zhang Binbin |
| 12. | "Fallen Stars (坠落星空)" | Xiao Xingxing Aurora | Xiao Xingxing Aurora | Xiao Xingxing Aurora |
| 13. | "Between Us, Outside of Us (我們之間，我們之外)" | Zhao Dengkai | Zhao Dengkai | Wang Liren |

== International Broadcast ==
| Channel | Area | Airing date | Note |
|---|---|---|---|
| Youku | China | March 8, 2021 – April 26, 2021 | If Non-member, it was updated 1 episode every Sunday, Monday and Tuesday. If Member, it was updated 2 episodes every Sunday, Monday and Tuesday. |
| WeTV | China | March 8, 2021 – April 26, 2021 | If Non-member, it was updated 1 episode every Sunday, Monday and Tuesday. If Member, it was updated 2 episodes every Sunday, Monday and Tuesday. |
| iQIYI | China | March 8, 2021 – April 26, 2021 | If Non-member, it was updated 1 episode every Sunday, Monday and Tuesday. If Member, it was updated 2 episodes every Sunday, Monday and Tuesday. |
| Idragon | India | 27 September 2021 - 17 May 2022 | It's all episodes aired on his YouTube Channel In Hindi dubbed language and all languages aired on his Application in India. |
| VTV Cần Thơ | Vietnam | 2025 - 2026 | 7.45pm from Monday to Saturday under the name "Tư Đằng" |

== Awards ==
- 2021: Best Works of the Year (年度平台最佳作品) – 8th Wenrong Award Presentation Ceremony (第八屆文榮獎頒獎典禮).
