= The Great Wall (2016 film) =

2016 film by Zhang Yimou

- United States theatrical release poster
- Simplified Chinese: 长城
- Traditional Chinese: 長城
- Hanyu Pinyin: Cháng Chéng
- Directed by: Zhang Yimou
- Screenplay by: Carlo Bernard; Doug Miro; Tony Gilroy
- Story by: Max Brooks; Edward Zwick; Marshall Herskovitz
- Produced by: Thomas Tull; Charles Roven; Jon Jashni; Peter Loehr
- Starring: Matt Damon; Jing Tian; Pedro Pascal; Willem Dafoe; Andy Lau
- Cinematography: Stuart Dryburgh; Zhao Xiaoding
- Edited by: Mary Jo Markey; Craig Wood
- Music by: Ramin Djawadi
- Production companies: Legendary Pictures; Atlas Entertainment; China Film Co., Ltd.; Le Vision Pictures
- Distributed by: China Film Group (China); Universal Pictures (Worldwide)
- Release dates: December 6, 2016 (Beijing); December 16, 2016 (China); February 17, 2017 (United States)
- Running time: 103 minutes
- Countries: China; United States
- Languages: English; Mandarin
- Budget: $150 million
- Box office: $334.9 million

The Great Wall (simplified Chinese: 长城; traditional Chinese: 長城) is a 2016 monster film directed by Zhang Yimou, with a screenplay by Carlo Bernard, Doug Miro and Tony Gilroy, from a story by Max Brooks, Edward Zwick and Marshall Herskovitz. An American and Chinese co-production starring Matt Damon, Jing Tian, Pedro Pascal, Willem Dafoe, and Andy Lau, the plot centers on two European mercenary warriors (Damon and Pascal) imprisoned by imperial Chinese forces within the Great Wall of China after arriving in search of gunpowder, eventually joining forces with the Chinese to help combat an alien threat. The Great Wall is Zhang's first English-language film.

Principal photography for the film began on March 30, 2015, in Qingdao, China, and it premiered in Beijing on December 6, 2016. It was released by China Film Group in China on December 16, 2016, the United States on February 17, 2017, by Universal Pictures, and in Japan on April 14, 2017, by Toho-Towa. The film, which received mixed reviews from critics, grossed $334.9 million worldwide and was considered a box-office bomb for losing up to $75 million.

== Plot ==
During the reign of Emperor Renzong, a group of European mercenaries travels to China, searching for gunpowder. A few miles north of the Great Wall, they are attacked by a monster. Only Irishman William Garin and Spaniard Pero Tovar survive. They sever its arm and bring it with them.

Upon reaching the Wall, they are taken prisoner by the Nameless Order, led by General Shao and Strategist Wang. The Nameless Order exists to combat Tao Tei, alien monsters that arrived from a meteorite and attack once every sixty years. The Order's commanders are surprised by the monsters' first assault, which has come one week early.

Shortly after, a horde of Tao Tei assail the Wall. During the battle, Garin and Tovar are freed by Ballard, an Englishman who came east twenty-five years earlier and has stayed ever since. Garin and Tovar display amazing battle skills, saving the life of young warrior Peng Yong and slaying two monsters, which earns them the Order's respect. Both sides sustain heavy losses before the monsters' queen aborts the attack. The three Europeans secretly plan to steal gunpowder and flee during the next monster attack.

That night, two Tao Tei reach the top of the Wall. General Shao is killed so he places Commander Lin in charge of the Nameless Order. An envoy from the capital arrives with an ancient scroll that suggests that the monsters are pacified by magnets. Wang believes the magnetic stone Garin carries enabled him to slay the Tao Tei he encountered. To test the hypothesis, he suggests they capture a Tao Tei alive and agrees to help. This delays the escape plans, angering Tovar, who nevertheless agrees to assist Garin.

In a new fight with the Tao Tei, the Westerners capture a monster and prove the theory. However, the Imperial envoy claims the creature and takes it to the capital to present to the Emperor.

It is revealed that the previous attacks had been a distraction so that the Tao Tei could dig a tunnel at the base of the Wall. While Lin investigates, Tovar and Ballard steal black powder and escape, knocking Garin unconscious for trying to stop them. Garin is arrested and jailed for his apparent betrayal.

Some distance away, Tovar is abandoned by Ballard who is captured by bandits who later accidentally ignite the powder causing an explosion. At the capital, the envoy presents the captive Tao Tei to the Emperor. The creature awakens and reveals its position to its queen, who signals the Tao Tei to attack.

Lin orders the use of hot-air balloons to rush to warn the capital and sets Garin free before embarking. Wang tells him to warn the outside world, but he boards the last balloon with Peng and Wang. They arrive just in time to save Lin from being devoured. Wang proposes a plan to kill the queen by tying explosives to the captured Tao Tei and giving it meat to be delivered to the queen. En route, a horde of Tao Tei attack the band, and Peng sacrifices himself to save the others.

After releasing the captive Tao Tei, Lin and Garin climb a tower so that he can detonate the explosives with an explosive arrow. Two of Garin's arrows are deflected by the Tao Tei queen's bodyguards, and Wang sacrifices himself to buy time for Lin and Garin to reach the upper floors. In a last gasp, Garin throws the magnet into the horde, creating a gap in the shields for Lin's spear carrying their last explosive to get through. The queen is killed, and the rest of the horde dies.

Garin is allowed to return home and elects to take the apprehended Tovar with him instead of a reward of black powder, much to Tovar's annoyance.

== Cast ==
- Matt Damon as William Garin (威廉·加林; Wēilián Jiālín), an Irish mercenary and expert archer.
- Pedro Pascal as Pero Tovar (佩罗· 托瓦尔; Pèiluó Tuōwǎěr), a Spanish mercenary.
- Jing Tian as Commander Lin Mae (林梅; Lín Méi), the leader of the Crane Troop
- Willem Dafoe as Sir Ballard (巴拉德; Bālādé), an English adventurer-turned-teacher in China.
- Zhang Hanyu as General Shao (邵殿帅; Shào Diànshuài), the leader of the Bear Troop and General of the Nameless Order.
- Lu Han as Peng Yong (彭勇; Péng Yǒng), a soldier in the Bear Troop.
- Eddie Peng as Commander Wu (吴将军; Wú Jiāngjūn), the head of the Tiger Troop.
- Kenny Lin as Commander Chen (陈将军; Chén Jiāngjūn), the head of the Eagle Troop.
- Junkai Wang as The Emperor of China
- Zheng Kai as Shen (沈; Shěn), an envoy from the capital
- Huang Xuan as Commander Deng (邓将军; Dèng Jiāngjūn), the head of the Deer Troop.
- Cheney Chen as Commander of the Imperial Guard
- Andy Lau as Strategist Wang (王军师; Wáng Jūnshī), the Strategist and War Counselor for the Nameless Order.
- Numan Acar as Najid

== Production ==
=== Filming ===
The company and I have been preparing for Great Wall for a long time. It is an action blockbuster. The reason I took the Great Wall project is that there have been requests in the last 10 or 20 years. Now the production is big enough and really appealing. And, very importantly, it has Chinese elements in it.

— Zhang Yimou, director

Principal photography began on March 30, 2015, on location in Qingdao. The filming wrapped on July 23, 2015. As of 2015 it was the most expensive film ever shot entirely in China.

Three walls were built during production as they could not shoot on the actual Great Wall. During the filmmaking, the director said the most impressive part for him was the presence of so many translators to handle communication, as he assembled an international crew for the filming. More than 100 on-set translators worked with the various cast and crew members.

=== Music ===
The film's score is composed by Ramin Djawadi. The first track called "Nameless Order" was released on December 14, 2016.

== Release ==
The Great Wall was released in China on December 16, 2016. It was released on February 17, 2017, in the United States by Universal Pictures. In the Philippines, the film was released by United International Pictures through Columbia Pictures Philippines on January 25, 2017.

=== Marketing ===
The Great Wall released its first trailer in July 2016. The trailer shows views of the Great Wall in fog, thousands of soldiers on a battlefield ready for war, and a mysterious monster, as well as the roster views of the cast, including Matt Damon and Andy Lau.

A song from Wang Leehom and Tan Weiwei was released on November 15, 2016, to promote The Great Wall. "Bridge of Fate" was composed and produced by Wang Leehom, with lyrics written by Vincent Fang, a longtime collaborator of singer-songwriter Jay Chou. Female rocker Tan Weiwei joined Wang for a duet, but with two different vocal styles. Wang sang pop, while Tan performed a traditional Qinqiang – a folk Chinese opera style from Shaanxi Province.

Chinese pop diva Jane Zhang released another new English song, Battle Field, and its promotional music video, for The Great Wall on November 22, 2016. The song was composed by King Logan and Maroon 5's keyboardist PJ Morton and written by Josiah "JoJo" Martin and Jane Zhang. It was produced by Timbaland.

Universal Pictures and Legendary Entertainment debuted eight character posters of the film on November 17, 2016. All in all, Legendary spent $110–120 million on promotion and advertising worldwide.

Legendary Pictures made a strategic decision to work with Chinese talent and investors and altered their production plan to better cater to Chinese audiences. The Great Wall, funded by Legendary, China Film Group, and Universal Pictures was an attempt at a joint production between Chinese and American talent. The film was directed by a big-time Chinese director, Zhang Yimou, and starred Hollywood stars Matt Damon and Willem Dafoe alongside Chinese film stars in an attempt to capture Chinese audiences. Although the film was considered to be a box office failure in China, the intent was clear and compelling. Other film studios such as Pixar have been making these minor adjustments to appeal to international audiences for years.

The film was released for digital download on May 9, 2017, and on DVD, Blu-ray on May 23, 2017.

== Reception ==
=== Box office ===
The Great Wall grossed $45.5 million in the United States and Canada, and $289.4 million in other territories, for a worldwide total of $334.9 million, against a production budget of $150 million.

In China, The Great Wall opened on December 16, 2016, and made $24.3 million on its first day and $67.4 million in its opening weekend. In the second weekend, it grossed $26.1 million. The film went on to gross $170.9 million at the Chinese box office, which is considered a disappointment.

In the United States and Canada, the film opened alongside A Cure for Wellness and Fist Fight, and was projected to gross $17–19 million from about 3,200 theaters in its opening weekend. The film made $970,000 at 2,470 theaters from Thursday night previews, and $5.9 million on its first day. It went on to open to $18.1 million, finishing third at the box office, behind holdovers The Lego Batman Movie and Fifty Shades Darker, and eventually grossing $45.2 million. The film joined Terminator Genisys, Warcraft and fellow 2017 release xXx: Return of Xander Cage as the only Hollywood films to earn $100 million in China without making $100 million in the United States.

In March 2017, The Hollywood Reporter wrote that the film was likely to lose about $75 million due to its underwhelming performance theatrically, as its performance in most major markets, including the United States and Canada, was disappointing. The loss incurred by all four studios varied, with Universal Pictures, which funded about 25% of the film's $150 million production budget, losing around $10 million. The rest of the investors, Legendary Entertainment, China Film Group and Le Vision Pictures, had an equal loss. Universal also covered almost all of the film's global marketing expenses of more than $80 million, so the studio incurred an even heavier loss. Ancillary revenues from home entertainment sales and TV rights, may offset some of the losses. In March 2018, Deadline Hollywood calculated the film lost the studio $74.5 million, when factoring together all expenses and revenues.

=== Critical response ===
Deadline reported that The Great Wall received "poor reviews" from critics. On Rotten Tomatoes, a review aggregator, the film has an approval rating of 35% based on 238 reviews, and an average rating of 4.90/10. The website's critical consensus reads, "For a Yimou Zhang film featuring Matt Damon and Willem Dafoe battling ancient monsters, The Great Wall is neither as exciting nor as entertainingly bonkers as one might hope." On Metacritic, the film has a score of 42 out of 100, based on 40 critics, indicating "mixed or average reviews". Audiences polled by CinemaScore gave the film an average grade of "B" on an A+ to F scale.

Ignatiy Vishnevetsky, writing for The A.V. Club, gave the film a B− on an A to F scale, saying: "There is no logical reason for the film to climax in a tower of stained glass that paints Lin Mae and William in psychedelic Suspiria lighting, but boy does it look gorgeous in 3-D." Simon Abrams, a contributor for RogerEbert.com, gave the film 3 out of 4 stars, summarizing: "The Great Wall is unlike any American blockbuster you've seen, a conservative movie with action set pieces that are actually inventive and thrilling enough to be worthwhile. See it on as big a screen as you can."

Clarence Tsui, writing for The Hollywood Reporter, gave the film a negative review, saying: "The Great Wall is easily the least interesting and involving blockbuster of the respective careers of both its director and star."

In 2021 Matt Damon said his daughter had mocked him for the movie. She made a point of calling it "The Wall", and when Damon corrected her with "The Great Wall", she remarked that there was nothing great about it.

== Criticisms ==
=== Comments on white protagonist in an East Asian setting ===
Because some of the characters, including a main character played by Matt Damon, are white in a film set in medieval China, the film was accused of whitewashing and using the white savior narrative prior to its release. Ann Hornaday, chief film critic for The Washington Post, wrote that "early concerns about Damon playing a 'white savior' in the film turn out to be unfounded: his character, a mercenary soldier, is heroic, but also clearly a foil for the superior principles and courage of his Chinese allies." Jonathan Kim, in a review for the Huffington Post, writes that "having seen The Great Wall, I can say that ... on the charge of The Great Wall insulting the Chinese and promoting white superiority, I say: Not Guilty. The question of whether The Great Wall is a white savior movie is a bit trickier, but I'm still going to say Not Guilty. ... On the charge of whitewashing, I say: Not Guilty." Deadline Hollywood noted that audience surveys by PostTrak indicated that Asians were turning out to see the film and constituted its second largest demographic group at 26% (behind Caucasians at 43%).

Director Zhang said that Damon was not playing a role that was intended for a Chinese actor. He criticized detractors for not being "armed with the facts" and stated that "In many ways The Great Wall is the opposite of what is being suggested. For the first time, a film deeply rooted in Chinese culture, with one of the largest Chinese casts ever assembled, is being made at tentpole scale for a world audience. I believe that is a trend that should be embraced by our industry."

=== Chinese critical response ===
The film's largest investor, the Wanda Group (co-owner of Legendary Pictures) has a good relationship with the Chinese Communist Party. As of July 2017, users of film review website Douban rated The Great Wall 4.9 out of 10. On Maoyan, another film review aggregator, the "professional score" is 4.9 out of 10. On December 28, 2016, the Communist Party's official media outlet, People's Daily, published an article on its website severely criticizing Douban and Maoyan for doing harm to the Chinese movie industry with their bad reviews. On the same day, Maoyan took down its "professional score" of 4.9 for The Great Wall but kept the high "audience score" of 8.4 out of 10. However, another article was published later in the evening from the same People's Daily and it commented the Chinese movie industry should accept people have the right to leave even one-star reviews. After the second article was published, many questioned People's Daily, as it had published two commentaries on the same day that were in stark contrast. The editorial board responded that the second article published later was the newspaper's opinion on the matter; the People's Daily overseas edition restated this the next day.

== See also ==
- Dragon Blade
- Europeans in Medieval China
