= Pacific Rim (disambiguation) =

The Pacific Rim is the land around the edge of the Pacific Ocean.

Pacific Rim may also refer to:

== Arts and entertainment ==
- Pacific Rim (film), a 2013 mecha monster film
  - Pacific Rim (franchise), a Sci-Fi franchise spawned from the 2013 film
  - Pacific Rim (soundtrack), soundtrack to the 2013 film
  - Pacific Rim (video game), video game based on the 2013 film
  - Pacific Rim: Uprising, the sequel to Pacific Rim
  - Pacific Rim: The Black, an anime series based on the films
- Pacific Rim Tour, Whitney Houston's concert tour

== Other uses ==
- Pacific Rim Championship, 2004 rugby competition
- Pacific Rim National Park, Canada
- Pacific Rim Mining Corporation, Canadian company
- Exercise RIMPAC, international naval combat activity

== See also ==
- Pacific (disambiguation)
- Pacific Ring of Fire
- Ring of Fire (disambiguation)
