= Pacific Rim (franchise) =

Science fiction media franchise

- Official franchise logo
- Created by: Travis Beacham; Guillermo del Toro
- Original work: Pacific Rim (2013)
- Owners: Legendary Pictures (1-3); Warner Bros. Pictures (1); Universal Pictures (2-3)
- Years: 2013–present

Films and television
- Film(s): Pacific Rim (2013); Pacific Rim Uprising (2018)
- Animated series: Pacific Rim: The Black (2021–2022)

Games
- Video game(s): Pacific Rim (2013)

Audio
- Soundtrack(s): Pacific Rim (2013); Pacific Rim Uprising (2022); Pacific Rim: The Black (2021); Pacific Rim: The Black Season 2 (2022)

Pacific Rim is a science fiction media franchise that consists of Kaiju-monster/Mecha installments. It includes two theatrical films, Pacific Rim (2013) and Pacific Rim Uprising (2018), and an animated television series, Pacific Rim: The Black (2021–2022). The overall plot centers around a future where giant Kaiju monsters arise from an interdimensional portal at the bottom of the Pacific Ocean, and the military response to their attacks. Based on an original story written by Travis Beacham, the franchise expands on his original fictional future by exploring humanity's actions for survival.

The original film was met with positive critical and financial reception. The second film was met with mixed critical reception, though it still made a profit at the box office. The franchise expanded with the release of an animated television series which lasted for two seasons, and released exclusively on Netflix. The show was well received by critics and its viewers.

The franchise will continue with a prequel television series in development.

== Films ==
Film	U.S. release date	Director	Screenwriters	Story by	Producers
Pacific Rim	July 12, 2013	Guillermo del Toro	Travis Beacham & Guillermo del Toro	Travis Beacham	Guillermo del Toro, Thomas Tull, Jon Jashni and Mary Parent
Pacific Rim Uprising	March 23, 2018	Steven S. DeKnight	Steven S. DeKnight, Emily Carmichael & Kira Snyder and T. S. Nowlin		Mary Parent, Cale Boyter, Guillermo del Toro, John Boyega, Femi Oguns, Thomas Tull and Jon Jashni

=== Pacific Rim (2013) ===
In 2013, legions of monstrous creatures from another universe known as Kaiju rise from the seas, when a wormhole to another dimension labelled as "The Breach" opened at the bottom of the Pacific Ocean. As the human race fought their advances, the races of the planet form a resistance and become involved in an all-out war. To thwart the monsters' advances, mankind built giant robots named Jaegers, equipped with the technology and weaponry to fight back. Controlled by two pilots linked together via a neural connection to the machines, the human forces have attempted to regain control of the planet called the Pan Pacific Defense Corps. Under the direction of a Jaeger pilot-turned Lead of the combined military named Marshal Stacker Pentecost, the Earth's civilizations withhold complete extinction.

In 2020, years after their initial attack, brothers Yancy and Raleigh Beckett co-pilot a Jaeger to defend Anchorage, Alaska from the attack of a powerful Kaiju codenamed "Knifehead". During the battle the creature kills Yancy, while Raleigh takes sole control of the machine and ultimately defeats the monster. Traumatized from the experience and saddened at the passing of his older brother, Raleigh quits the Jaeger program. Now in 2025, humanity is on the verge of defeat. In one last stand against the Kaiju, the future of the human race rests in the hands of Raleigh, and an untested trainee named Mako Mori, who must work together after being recruited by Pentecost to pilot an older model Jaeger of a bygone era. Together, the pair must overcome their differences, in a combined effort to close "The Breach" and stop the advances to save the planet.

=== Pacific Rim Uprising (2018) ===
In 2035, ten years after the Battle of the Breach successfully closed the portal at the bottom of the Pacific Ocean through which an alien race called the Precursors sent beasts from another dimension to conquer the planet, Jake Pentecost makes a career out of stealing and selling parts of the old Jaeger machines on the Black Market. The once-promising pilot, whose heroic father gave his life to secure the victory against the gigantic Kaiju, abandoned his training only to become involved in the criminal underworld. Despite his efforts to turn away from his upbringing, Pentecost soon finds that he is pulled back into his military position when a new and unstoppable threat begins to rip through cities. With civilization again threatened on the brink of complete obliteration, he seeks to mend broken relationships and reunites with his adoptive sister Mako Mori. Together with the combined forces of the human race, Jake must rise to the occasion and live up to his legendary father's legacy.

=== Future ===
In October 2017, DeKnight stated that the plot to a third movie had been written, though its development is dependent on the critical and financial success of Pacific Rim Uprising. The filmmaker stated that plans include expanding the fictional universe into sequels and spin-offs directly tied to previous installments, as well as standalone releases as well; comparing plans to those made in the Star Wars and Star Trek franchises. DeKnight later talked about studio interest in having the franchise crossover with the MonsterVerse.

In August 2024, DeKnight revealed that the story he had written for a third movie included further exploration of the various dimensions through which the kaiju originate, which would have been explored through a plot involving a multiverse. The filmmaker explained that humans would have discovered that the intergalactic monsters were manipulated by the alien Precursor race; while the humans would have joined forces to help free the creatures. Though the script was not moving forward at the studio, it had been written to include the main characters crossing over into the Monsterverse by the end of the movie. DeKnight acknowledged that aspects of the story may be repurposed in a potential future installment, while he expressed interest in seeing Guillermo del Toro return to the franchise as director of the third film.

== Television ==
Series overview
Series	Season	Episodes	Originally released	Network	Showrunners	Writers	Executive producers
Pacific Rim: The Black	1	7	March 4, 2021	Netflix	Greg Johnson & Craig Kyle	Greg Johnson, Craig Kyle, Paul Giacoppo, Nicole Dubuc	Shuzo John Shiota, Greg Johnson, Craig Kyle
Pacific Rim: The Black	2	7	April 19, 2022	Netflix	Greg Johnson & Craig Kyle	Greg Johnson, Craig Kyle, Paul Giacoppo, Nicole Dubuc	Shuzo John Shiota, Greg Johnson, Craig Kyle

=== Pacific Rim: The Black (2021-2022) ===
In November 2018, an anime-styled animated sequel series was announced to be in development. Craig Kyle and Greg Johnson serve as co-creators and co-showrunners. The plot follows the events of Uprising, and centers around a perfectionist teenage boy and his naïve younger sister, who together pilot an abandoned Jaeger to desperately cross the dangerous landscape inhabited by Kaiju monsters, in an attempt to find their missing parents. The project is a joint-venture production between Legendary Entertainment, Legendary Television, and Polygon Pictures, and released as a Netflix Original Series. The series is distributed via streaming exclusively on Netflix. The series was ordered for two seasons.

The Black culminated with a second and final season, released in April 2022.

=== Untitled prequel series ===
In August 2024, Legendary announced that a live-action prequel television series is in development. The plot will explore the origins of the events which launched the franchise in the 2013 original movie. Eric Heisserer will serve as creator, showrunner, writer and executive producer for the series, which will be a joint-venture production between Legendary Television, and Chronology Entertainment. In April 2025, it was announced that the series had found distribution through Amazon Prime Video, with Amazon MGM Studios joining as a production company.

== Main cast and characters ==
List indicators

This section includes characters who will appear or have appeared in the franchise in main roles.

- An empty grey cell indicates the character was not in the film, or that the character's official presence has not yet been confirmed.
- ^{A} indicates an appearance through archival footage or audio.
- ^{P} indicates an appearance in onscreen photographs.
- ^{V} indicates a voice-only role.
- ^{Y} indicates a younger version of the character.

Character	Films		Television series	
Character	Pacific Rim	Pacific Rim Uprising	Pacific Rim: The Black	
Character	Pacific Rim	Pacific Rim Uprising	Season 1	Season 2
Character	2013	2018	2021	2022
Raleigh Becket	Charlie Hunnam Paul Michael Wyers^{Y}		CGI	
Mar. Stacker Pentecost	Idris Elba	Idris Elba^{A}^{P}		
Mako Mori	Rinko Kikuchi Mana Ashida^{Y}	Rinko Kikuchi		
Dr. Newton "Newt" Geiszler	Charlie Day Trek Buccino^{Y}	Charlie Day		
Dr. Hermann Gottlieb	Burn Gorman Drew Adkins^{Y}	Burn Gorman		
Hercules "Herc" Hansen	Max Martini		Max Martini^{V}^{A}	
Hannibal Chau	Ron Perlman			
Chuck Hansen	Robert Kazinsky			
Tendo Choi	Clifton Collins Jr.			
Yancy Becket	Diego Klattenhoff Tyler Stevenson^{Y}			
The Precursors	CGI	Charlie Day		
Jake Pentecost		John Boyega		
Nathan "Nate" Lambert		Scott Eastwood		
Liwen Shao		Jing Tian		
Amara Namani		Cailee Spaeny Madeleine McGraw^{Y}		
Jules Reyes		Adria Arjona		
Marshal Quan Chenglei		Max Zhang		
Ou-Yang Jinhai		Wesley Wong		
Viktoriya Malikova		Ivanna Sakhno		
Ryoichi Hatayama		Mackenyu		
Taylor Travis			Calum Worthy^{V} Yusuke Kobayashi^{V} Cole Keriazakos^{Y}^{V}	Calum Worthy^{V} Yusuke Kobayashi^{V}
Hayley Travis			Gideon Adlon^{V} Yui Shimodaya^{V} Camryn Jones^{Y}^{V}	Gideon Adlon^{V} Yui Shimodaya^{V}
Loa			Erica Lindbeck^{V}	Erica Lindbeck^{V}
The Kaiju Boy			Ben Diskin^{V}	Ben Diskin^{V}
Mei			Victoria Grace^{V}	Victoria Grace^{V}
Shane			Andy McPhee^{V}	Andy McPhee^{V}
The Bunyip Man				Rhys Darby^{V}

== Additional crew and production details ==
Title	Crew/Detail					
Title	Composer	Cinematographer	Editors	Production companies	Distributing company	Running time
Pacific Rim	Ramin Djawadi	Guillermo Navarro	John Gilroy & Peter Amundson	Legendary Pictures, Double Dare You Productions	Warner Bros. Pictures	2 hrs 12 mins
Pacific Rim Uprising	Lorne Balfe	Dan Mindel	Zach Staenberg, Dylan Highsmith & Josh Schaeffer	Legendary Pictures, Double Dare You Productions, UpperRoom Productions	Universal Pictures	1 hr 51 mins
Pacific Rim: The Black	Brandon Campbell	—N/a	Kazunari Hoshino, Hideaki Kashima, Lindsey Myers, Daisuke Tsukioka, Adam Redding, Hiroaki Sasa, and Yukari Toneya	Legendary Television Studios, Polygon Pictures, Netflix Original Series	Netflix	7 hrs (30 minute episodes)

== Reception ==
=== Box office and financial performance ===
Film	Box office gross			Box office ranking		Home video sales gross	Worldwide total gross income	Budget	Worldwide total net income	Ref.
Film	North America	Other territories	Worldwide	All-time North America	All-time worldwide	North America	Worldwide total gross income	Budget	Worldwide total net income	Ref.
Pacific Rim	$101,802,906	$309,200,000	$411,002,906	#735	#240	$59,184,081	$470,186,987	$190,000,000	$280,186,987	
Pacific Rim Uprising	$59,874,525	$231,055,623	$290,930,148	#1,445	#372	$16,549,413	$307,479,561	$155,000,000	$152,479,561	
Totals	$161,677,431	$540,255,623	$701,933,054	x̄ #1,090	x̄ #306	$75,733,494	$777,666,548	$345,000,000	$432,666,548	

=== Critical and public response ===
Critical and public response to Pacific Rim
Title	Critical		Public
Title	Rotten Tomatoes	Metacritic	CinemaScore
Pacific Rim	72% (295 reviews)	65 (48 reviews)	A−
Pacific Rim Uprising	42% (264 reviews)	44 (45 reviews)	B
Pacific Rim: The Black	71% (14 reviews)	—N/a	—N/a
