= Pacific Rim Uprising (soundtrack) =

Pacific Rim: Uprising – Original Motion Picture Soundtrack

Film score by Lorne Balfe
- Released: March 23, 2018 (Digital); April 6, 2018 (Physical)
- Recorded: February–March 2018
- Studio: Synchron Scoring Stage, Vienna
- Genre: Film Score
- Length: 75:00
- Label: Milan Records
- Producers: Lorne Balfe; Max Aruj

Lorne Balfe chronology
| The Hurricane Heist (2018) | Pacific Rim: Uprising – Original Motion Picture Soundtrack (2018) | Mission: Impossible – Fallout (2018) |

Pacific Rim chronology
| Pacific Rim (2013) | Pacific Rim: Uprising (2018) |

Professional ratings
Review scores
| Source | Rating |
|---|---|
| Metro UK | 4/5 stars |
| TribLive | 2/5 stars |
| Movie Wave | 1/5 stars |

Pacific Rim: Uprising – Original Motion Picture Soundtrack is the film score to the 2018 film of the same name, composed by Lorne Balfe. The score was recorded at the Synchron Scoring Stage in Vienna with the Synchron Stage Orchestra conducted by Johannes Vogel. The soundtrack was released by Milan Records digitally on iTunes on March 23, 2018, while the physical soundtrack was released on April 6, 2018.

== Background ==
John Paesano had originally been attached as composer for the film, based on past collaborations with director Steven S. DeKnight on the Marvel television series Daredevil. Paesano had been recording his score at the Synchron Scoring Stage, but was replaced by Lorne Balfe on January 24, 2018. No official reason was given about Paesano's removal.

== Track listing ==
All music is composed by Lorne Balfe, except where noted.

| No. | Title | Writer(s) | Artist | Length |
|---|---|---|---|---|
| 1. | "Pacific Rim Uprising" | | | 4:47 |
| 2. | "Born Into War" | | | 4:12 |
| 3. | "Rise of the Jaegers" | | | 1:38 |
| 4. | "Go Big or Go Extinct" (Patrick Stump Remix) | Ramin Djawadi | | 2:10 |
| 5. | "Daddy Yo" | Andrew Hershey; Wizkid | Wizkid featuring Efya | 2:39 |
| 6. | "Shatterdome Arrival" | | | 2:03 |
| 7. | "Sneaking In" | | | 3:07 |
| 8. | "Shao Industries" | | | 4:35 |
| 9. | "Scrapper Chase" | | | 3:56 |
| 10. | "Flashback" | | | 2:17 |
| 11. | "Nobody Speak" | Joshua Davis; Jaime Meline; Michael Render | DJ Shadow featuring Run the Jewels | 3:15 |
| 12. | "Kaiju Brain" | | | 2:11 |
| 13. | "Combat" | | | 2:19 |
| 14. | "Obsidian Fury" | | | 3:31 |
| 15. | "Get It Done" | | | 3:24 |
| 16. | "Come Down" | Brandon Paak Anderson; Tony Cottrell | Anderson .Paak | 2:59 |
| 17. | "Shatterdome Attacked" | | | 7:18 |
| 18. | "Amara" | | | 2:36 |
| 19. | "Coming Together" | | | 3:14 |
| 20. | "On the Move" | | | 2:21 |
| 21. | "Mega Kaiju" | | | 2:29 |
| 22. | "Battle Speech" | | | 2:39 |
| 23. | "End Game" | | | 2:00 |
| 24. | "Victory" | | | 2:18 |
| 25. | "The Revenge" | | | 1:52 |
| Total length: | | | | 75:00 |

The following tracks appear in the film, but are not credited on the film's soundtrack with the exception of "Come Down".

- "Come Down" by Anderson .Paak - Plays in the cadet's room when Amara shows up.
- "I Am Very Glad, As I Am Finally Returning Back Home" by Eduard Khil - Plays when Cadet Llya and Cadet Suresh are deployed in the Jaeager.
- "I Want to Know What Love Is" by Foreigner - Plays in the background during Newt's evening with Alice.

== Personnel ==
- Music Supervisors — Peter Afterman & Margaret Yen
- Associate Music Supervisor — Alison Litton
- Music Coordinator — Oriana Pedone
- Music Production Coordinator — Queenie Li
- Score Technical Assistants — Max Aruj
- Score Programmers — Clay Duncan, Jon Aschalew & Ed Buller
- Solo Cello — Peter Gregson
- Music Editor — Richard Ziegler
- Orchestrator — Shane Rutherfoord-Jones
- Score Mixer — John Chapman
- Score Mix Assistant — Alfredo Pasquel
- Recording Engineer — Bernd Mazagg
- Pro Tools Operator — Martin Weismayr
