= Gemini Man (soundtrack) =

Gemini Man (Music from the Motion Picture)

Film score by Lorne Balfe
- Released: October 11, 2019
- Recorded: July–September 2019
- Studio: Remote Control Productions
- Genre: Film score
- Length: 61:42
- Label: Paramount Music

Lorne Balfe chronology
Mission: Impossible – Fallout (2018)	Gemini Man (2019)	6 Underground (2019)

Gemini Man (Music from the Motion Picture) is the soundtrack to the 2019 film Gemini Man, directed by Ang Lee and starred Will Smith in dual roles: as Henry Brogan, and Jackson Brogan a.k.a. "Junior". Featuring the original score composed by Lorne Balfe, the album consisted of 17 tracks released by Paramount Music on the same date as the film, October 11, 2019. A limited edition CD of 3,000 copies by La-La Land Records also accompanied the score. The score received mixed critical response.

== Development ==
"The first time watching the film, I had to help the story musically in that each of Will's characters had their own theme but both were of the same DNA. So I wrote melodies for them both but they'd play on top of each other so that, no matter what, they were connected."

— Lorne Balfe, on the music of Gemini Man

In February 2019, Marco Beltrami was recruited to score music for the film. However, he was replaced by Lorne Balfe in June 2019. Balfe was hired as he previously worked with the film's producer Jerry Bruckheimer on Geostorm (2017) and 12 Strong (2018), and through his contact, he met Ang Lee during the Christmas of 2018 and introduced him to the team. During the musical discussions, Lee wanted to focus the emotion between Henry and Jackson ("Junior") which was the hardest one as he spent longer on thinking the themes and writing. He then wrote two different pieces of music that work on top of each other, which became the separate themes for the characters. He collaborated with cellist Tina Guo who played music for Gladiator (2000) and Wonder Woman (2017) and had two different cellos: the electric cello for Henry and acoustic for Junior, as "because in one respect, even though Junior is a clone, the point I wanted to make is that he is more real than Henry". He also had to rewrite the music so as to match with the visuals and performances which was more real.

== Track listing ==
No.	Title	Length
1.	"Last Shot"	3:56
2.	"Burning the Past"	3:45
3.	"Are You Dia?"	2:57
4.	"First Confrontation"	3:38
5.	"Cartagena"	2:33
6.	"Bike Fu"	3:10
7.	"Catacombs"	4:27
8.	"I Know You Inside and Out"	5:02
9.	"Henry and Junior"	2:32
10.	"Fighting Gemini"	4:00
11.	"Teaming Up"	2:27
12.	"Don't You Feel Pain?"	3:17
13.	"Verris"	3:38
14.	"A Perfect Version of You"	3:52
15.	"Those Ghosts"	2:26
16.	"Thanks, Brother"	2:00
17.	"Gemini Man"	8:02
Total length:		61:42

== Reception ==
Calling it a "pretty solid score", Zanobard Reviews gave 6/10 to the music and called the main theme as "the star of the show, being quite memorable and very enjoyable to listen to". Rob Hunter of Film School Rejects called it as a "rousing, propulsive score". A review from Film Music Central commented "The soundtrack for Gemini Man is adequate and gets the job done, but it's nothing that will blow you away." In contrast, James Southall of Movie Wave called it as an "extremely dull and as far away as you could get from the sort of thoughtful, multi-layered music you usually hear in Ang Lee movies (which is perfectly understandable given the film itself is also a long way from his usual)".
