= Reliance Games =

Indian video game developer

- Company type: Subsidiary
- Industry: Video games
- Founded: 2006; 19 years ago
- Key people: Amit Khanduja (CEO)
- Parent: Reliance Anil Dhirubhai Ambani Group

Reliance Games is an international developer and publisher of mobile games known for several video games like Pacific Rim, Real Steel, Real Steel WRB, Total Recall, and Drone Shadow Strike with about 200 million overall downloads through games launched across 40 countries on iTunes Store, Google Play Store, Amazon Store and Windows Store. Headquartered in Mumbai, It's a part of Reliance Entertainment a wholly owned subsidiary of the Reliance Anil Dhirubhai Ambani Group in the media and entertainment business. Reliance Games has developed many mobile games in association with Hollywood studios such as DreamWorks, Sony Pictures Animation, Paramount Pictures, Columbia Pictures and Warner Bros.

Currently, Reliance Games has a global presence with game creating studios across the United States, United Kingdom, Japan, Korea and India with a focus on boxing, runner and racing genres for Android, iOS, Amazon and Windows platforms. Around 70 game titles have been created for Android and roughly 200 java-supported games. Headed by CEO Amit Khanduja, Reliance Games has announced plans to incubate and invest in gaming sector start-ups which involves sharing intellectual property with mentoring on engineering, product management and designing, and character illustration. As a part of its third-party publishing activity, the company helps game developers worldwide in publishing games on various platforms under a revenue-sharing model. North America, UK, Russia and Korea cater to 70% of the Revenue with 20% coming from India.

As of September 2015, Reliance Games has over 200 million downloads on mobile games launched globally.

== History ==
Reliance Games was founded in 2006.

The first game in the series, Real Steel was launched as an extension of the DreamWorks 2011 action movie Real Steel. The Game received a ranking of No. 1 on iPad in five countries, top 5 among iPhone games in 27 countries and was in the top 10 games on Apple App Store in over 100 countries.

In March 2013, Reliance Games acquired 100% stake in Funel, a Japanese mobile games development and publishing firm and a 51% in Bhusan-based Bluesom Inc.

On 17 October 2013, Real Steel World Robot Boxing (a.k.a. Real Steel WRB) the sequel of Real Steel was launched and within a few days the game had five million downloads and has been its most successful game title.

In July 2013, Pacific Rim was introduced which tasked players to protect the world's cities from aliens which have risen from the seas to destroy humanity. The game is an extension of the film Pacific Rim by Guillermo del Toro and was created in association with Warner Bros. Pictures and Legendary Pictures.

On 5 March 2015, Reliance Games in association with DreamWorks Studios announced the launch of Real Steel Champions which lets players build their own robots and fight with them to win the Championship.

In September 2015, before the launch of the movie Hotel Transylvania 2 produced by Sony Pictures Animation, Reliance Games introduced Hotel Transylvania 2 The Game. This builder genre game includes all the characters and locations from the movie. Any player can customize their monster-land, participate in quests and play mini games.

On 30 June 2016, The BFG Game based on the movie The BFG directed by Steven Spielberg and the book 'The BFG' written by Roald Dahl made its debut for mobile devices, introduced by Reliance Games.

In November 2022, Reliance Games and Atari partnered with each other to publish Citytopia.
