= Pacific Rim: The Black =

Japanese-American animated television series

- Promotional poster
- パシフィック・リム: 暗黒の大陸
- Genre: Mecha
- Written by: Greg Johnson; Craig Kyle; Paul Giacoppo; Nicole Dubuc
- Directed by: Hiroyuki Hayashi (Note: Credited as Supervising Director); Kim Jae-hong
- Music by: Brandon Campbell
- Countries of origin: United States; Japan
- Original language: English
- No. of episodes: 14

Production
- Producers: Jack Liang; Bill E. Miller; Ken Duer
- Running time: 21–29 minutes
- Production companies: Legendary Television; Polygon Pictures

Original release
- Network: Netflix
- Release: March 4, 2021 – April 19, 2022

Pacific Rim: The Black (Note: Known in Japan as Pacific Rim: The Dark Continent (パシフィック・リム: 暗黒の大陸, Pashifikku Rimu: Ankoku no Tairiku.)) is a Japanese-American adult animated original net animation (ONA) series based on and a continuation of the Pacific Rim films. The third installment overall of the titular franchise, the series was developed and co-written by Greg Johnson and Craig Kyle for Netflix. Season 1 debuted on March 4, 2021, while the second and final season was released on April 19, 2022.

== Plot ==
Set in the same universe as the original film, a race of monsters called Kaiju arise from the Pacific Rim and overrun the continent of Australia. Humans build gigantic armed mecha, Jaegers, to fight back, but fail and the continent is abandoned, leaving only isolated pockets of survivors. Teenage siblings Taylor and Hayley Travis are left behind by their parents, who leave to combat the Kaiju but never return. Five years later, Hayley stumbles across a long-abandoned training Jaeger called Atlas Destroyer which she and Taylor activate, and they set out on a quest to find their parents. They not only have to deal with marauding Kaiju, but other survivors who are also fighting for survival and attempt to seize Atlas Destroyer for themselves.

== Voice cast ==
=== Main ===
- Gideon Adlon (English) and Yui Shimodaya (Japanese) as Hayley Travis
  - Camryn Jones as young Hayley Travis
- Calum Worthy (English) and Yusuke Kobayashi (Japanese) as Taylor Travis
  - Cole Keriazakos (English) and Yuki Urushiyama (Japanese) as young Taylor Travis
- Ben Diskin as Kaiju Boy
- Victoria Grace (English) and Ayaka Shimoyamada (Japanese) as Mei
- Erica Lindbeck (English) and Iku Minase (Japanese) as Loa
- Andy McPhee (English) and Jin Yamanoi (Japanese) as Shane

=== Recurring ===
- Jason Spisak (English) and Yuya Uchida (Japanese) as Ford Travis
- Allie MacDonald (English) and Yuko Kaida (Japanese) as Brina Travis
- David Errigo Jr. as Root
- Bryton James as Corey
- Martin Klebba (English) and Rui Kato (Japanese) as Spyder
- Leonardo Nam (English) and Daisuke Hirakawa (Japanese) as Rickter
- Nolan North as Marshall Rask
- Vincent Piazza (English) and Tomoya Yano (Japanese) as Joel Wyrick
- Ryan Robinson as Demarcus
- Ron Yuan as Shiro Ito

=== Guest ===
- Max Martini as Hercules "Herc" Hansen (archive audio)
- Rhys Darby as Bunyip Man

== Production ==
In November 2018, Netflix announced that an anime series adaptation based on the films was in the works. It was originally set for a 2020 release. During their virtual "Anime Festival" livestream event in October 2020, its title Pacific Rim: The Black and a 2021 release window was revealed. A second season was also greenlit.

The series is produced by American company Legendary Television, and animated by Japanese studio Polygon Pictures. Greg Johnson and Marvel Comics writer Craig Kyle serve as showrunners, and Brandon Campbell is composing the series' music. The series is directed by Jae-hong Kim and Hiroyuki Hayashi, with episodic direction by Takeshi Iwata, Susumu Sugai, and Masayuki Uemoto, and art direction by Yūki Moriyama.

Several creators pitched ideas to Legendary, and it was ultimately the concept by showrunners Greg Johnson and Craig Kyle that ended up moving forward to be pitched to Netflix. Before production on the series itself began, Johnson and Kyle had thought about making the series in either 2D or 3D animation, but hadn't decided which to go with. The more they thought about the cost of the 2D animation, and the limits 2D animation would have on certain aspects of the series, such as how the camera would move in a highly detailed 2D environment, the more they leaned towards using 3D animation. Ultimately, it was decided that they would produce the series in 3D animation, but they wanted to keep the 2D aesthetics, which led them to Polygon Pictures, because they were the "masters at this approach." Polygon Pictures representative director Shūzō John Shiota (who served as an executive producer on the series) and producer Jack Liang expressed excitement over the idea of producing a work within the Pacific Rim universe, and decided to take on the job. Polygon Pictures staff handled a majority of the series' design work, with some assistance by the western team's supervising director Jae-hong Kim, and both teams convened in Tokyo to discuss these designs.

== Episodes ==
=== Series overview ===
Season	Episodes	Originally released
1	7	March 4, 2021
2	7	April 19, 2022

=== Season 1 (2021) ===
No. overall	No. in season	Title	Directed by	Written by	Original release date
1	1	"From the Shadows"	Takeshi Iwata; Susumu Sugai; Masayuki Uemoto	Greg Johnson; Craig Kyle	March 4, 2021
The Australian continent is overrun by powerful monsters called Kaiju and siblings Hayley and Taylor Travis are left behind while their parents, two Jaeger pilots, leave to find help in Sydney with their Jaeger. Five years later, the survivors have built a self-sustaining community in the desert. One day, Hayley accidentally finds an old Mark III training Jaeger named Atlas Destroyer, but when she powers it up, it attracts a huge red-veined Kaiju, a Category IV codenamed Copperhead, which destroys the settlement, killing all of its occupants. Barely managing to escape, Taylor and Hayley decide to take the Jaeger and try to reach Sydney.
2	2	"Into the Black"	Takeshi Iwata; Susumu Sugai	Greg Johnson; Craig Kyle	March 4, 2021
Hayley and Taylor gradually learn how to pilot Atlas Destroyer with the aid of its onboard AI Loa, and leave the settlement. They reach Meridian city, but the Jaeger's power cells are depleted. While searching on foot for new power cells, they are attacked by small dog-like Kaiju, some of which are caught and eaten by a towering monster that resembles a cross between a Kaiju and a Jaeger. While there, they encounter a young silver-haired boy encased in a chamber of fluid, and they decide to take him with them. While they do find a power cell, it is damaged in the escape from the city, forcing the two to try and find another.
3	3	"Bogan"	Masayuki Uemoto	Greg Johnson; Craig Kyle	March 4, 2021
Hayley, Taylor, and the mute child Boy see four other humans in the distance near a river who appear to be gathering Kaiju eggs. Boy runs towards them but he is detected by an amphibious Kaiju, the mother of the eggs, which leaves the water. It attacks and eats two of the egg snatchers before the others destroy it with a rocket-propelled grenade. The survivors, Mei and Rickter, take Hayley, Taylor and Boy to their mobile camp, called Bogan. The leader, Shane, trades Kaiju eggs with a man named Ferno for Jaeger parts, including power cells, while also being suspicious of Taylor, Hayley and Boy. Ferno's team then trade the eggs to a mysterious group called the "Sisters" who live in the hills. The trade is interrupted by a scuffle between Rickter and the Travis siblings, resulting in a gunfight. In the end, Shane destroys the eggs but keeps the parts, forcing Ferno to leave. Shane interrogates Taylor using a modified neural bridge to extract his memories, which includes the existence and location of their Jaeger.
4	4	"Up and Running"	Susumu Sugai	Paul Giacoppo	March 4, 2021
Taylor awakens to find the Bogan camp on its way to Meridian to retrieve Atlas Destroyer. They use a power cell to restart Atlas and their technician, Joel Wyrick, tries to partner with other members of Bogan who do not have Drift training, but they all fail, resulting in Joel receiving neural damage. Meanwhile, the Jaeger's energy pattern alerts Copperhead, which heads in their direction. Shane orders Taylor to copilot Atlas with Mei. Their synchronization is incomplete, and when Taylor tries to fight the Kaiju, it removes and eats the right arm of the Jaeger. Taylor and Mei run Atlas into a minefield where Spyder manages to detonate mines which render the Kaiju unconscious. Shane is angry at the damage caused to Atlas, and orders Hayley, Taylor and Boy to leave without their Jaeger.
5	5	"Escaping Bogan"	Masayuki Uemoto	Nicole Dubuc	March 4, 2021
Mei suspects that Shane plans to kill the Travis group, Hayley, Taylor and Boy, and warns them to leave before sunrise. Shane orders Joel to get the Jaeger operational, but his brain damage from the failed attempt to drift with other potential Bogan co-pilots hampers him. Shane sends Rickter to kill the Travis group, and during a struggle, he shoots Boy with no apparent effect. Mei arrives and kills Rickter, then smuggles Taylor back into Atlas so that he can pilot it out, however Hayley and Boy are recaptured. Joel suggests that Taylor pilot the Jaegar himself using the risky maneuver of "ghost piloting" with a former pilot's memories. Taylor succeeds by using the memories of Ranger Hercules "Herc" Hansen and uses Atlas to rescue Hayley and Boy. He then collects Mei, but collapses from exhaustion so Hayley and Mei pilot Atlas away together. Shane calls Mei on her walkie-talkie, but Joel answers and Shane detonates the device, killing him.
6	6	"Boneyard"	Susumu Sugai	Paul Giacoppo	March 4, 2021
After Mei leaves the group once she's buried Joel, electrified chasms called "Breaches" start occurring, and Atlas begins falling into one. Hayley and Taylor jump on board and manage to extract Atlas. Boy becomes separated, but they find him in a graveyard with skeletal remains of different Kaiju: Leatherbacks, Slatterns and Mutavores. There are also destroyed Jaegers: November Ajax, Valor Omega, Titan Redeemer, and 23 drones from the Uprising War. Upon seeing a downed Jaeger named Horizon Bravo, Loa suffers a glitch and temporarily shuts down while Taylor is revealed to have absorbed some of Herc Hansen's memories from their ghost drift. The Travises find Boy near another breach, but a Category III Acidquill type Kaiju emerges from a chasm. It attacks Atlas but the Kaiju-mech from Meridian appears and kills it. Boy seems to be able to communicate with the Kaiju-mech and it creates a neural bridge through which the Travises see elements from the Uprising War; a time when Kaiju brain cells infected drone Jaegers. The creature, named Apex, is apparently the only drone that survived; it has evolved into a single bio-mech unit that has no allegiances. It established a mental connection with Boy in Meridian and establishes the Travises are friends of Boy. Apex retrieves a Jaeger arm from the scrap and hands it to Atlas. After Hayley and Taylor install the arm, which is from a Mk. IV Jaeger named Chaos Nemesis, they discover that it contains a vanadium steel saber chain weapon. Apex begins feeding on the dead Kaiju while Boy rejoins Hayley and Taylor in Atlas.
7	7	"Showdown"	Masayuki Uemoto	Greg Johnson; Craig Kyle	March 4, 2021
Taylor presses Loa for more information about the Uprising War and why she glitched at the sight of Horizon Bravo, but she refuses to elaborate. Loa detects signals from an unknown Jaeger from Clayton city so they take Atlas there. When they arrive, they find Mei and they all take some time out to relax together in a café, however Mei recalls unhappy events there when she first met Shane and her mood changes. While exploring, the Travises find the wreck of Hunter Vertigo, their parents' Jaeger. They enter the hatch and access the last messages left by their parents, Rangers Ford and Brina Travis, as they were being attacked by Kaiju. The youngsters leave, but find that Copperhead has tracked, attacked, and toppled Atlas then it attacks them, injuring Hayley. Taylor and Mei enter Atlas, while Boy stays to protect Hayley. As the Kaiju charges, Boy transforms into a huge blue-veined humanoid Kaiju and attacks Copperhead, but gets buried under tons of rubble. Atlas arrives and uses its saber chain to attack and injure Copperhead. Meanwhile, Hayley has unjammed a nuclear missile in Hunter, and fires it at Copperhead, destroying it completely. She returns to the Kaiju Boy who is still trapped but alive. Taylor realizes that the Precursors, the creators of the Kaiju, can make Kaiju that look like humans. On the rooftops above, a group of Sisters appear and declare that the Kaiju Messiah has come.

=== Season 2 (2022) ===
No. overall	No. in season	Title	Directed by	Written by	Original release date
8	1	"Boy"	Susumu Sugai	Greg Johnson; Craig Kyle	April 19, 2022
Hayley, Taylor and Mei reel from the fact that Boy is a Kaiju. Though he returns to human form, Mei departs while the siblings argue about keeping Boy around, only to chase after him when he runs off. Boy is lured into a trap by the Sisters of the Kaiju, who attach a Kaiju tick to him. Hayley and Taylor take Boy back to Mei hoping for a solution. She kills the tick but cannot help with its poison, though she points them to a Kaiju fanatic who may know how to treat him. Taylor convinces Mei to replace a frantic Hayley as his co-pilot, and the group travels to the fanatic's home only to find it is a valley overrun with Kaiju. At the same time, Shane chases after Atlas Destroyer, determined to recover Mei with Spyder's help.
9	2	"The Never Never"	Masayuki Uemoto	Paul Giacoppo	April 19, 2022
Atlas Destroyer reaches Never-Never Valley, which is filled with too many Kaiju to sneak past or fight. Taylor and Mei refuse to enter, but Hayley insists on pressing forward. The argument is cut short when an Acidquill knocks them into the Valley. They kill it and are saved from the other Kaiju by the fanatic, who buys time for Atlas to hide. The one-armed Kaiju whisperer, who calls himself Bunyip-man, studies Boy and offers to try an antivenom he designed to counter the tick's poison. The Sisters of the Kaiju enter the valley and kill the Rippers Bunyip-man captured as food for the Valley's denizens, agitating them. He is eaten by a Category I Trespasser along with the antivenom dose. With nothing holding the Kaiju back, the group boards Atlas and narrowly escapes the Valley, only to find that their exit was also the entrance to the evil Sisters' domain.
10	3	"Divide"	Susumu Sugai	Nicole Dubuc	April 19, 2022
The Sisters of the Kaiju corner Atlas Destroyer and demand that the Kaiju Boy be turned over to them, leading to an argument between the Travis siblings and Mei. Mei wants to keep Boy as leverage over the Sisters, Hayley wants to fight to protect him, and Taylor wants to turn him over without fighting. While working on Atlas Destroyer alone, Taylor secretly turns over Boy in order to protect his sister, although he shows remorse for his actions. The next morning, the Sisters send five Kaiju hybrids to destroy the Jaeger. Taylor and Mei manage to take out two while Shane and Spyder unexpectedly come to their rescue, knocking out the Sisters controlling the hybrids, causing the remaining three hybrids to back off. Shane and Spyder then approach the group with a Sister that they've captured who is revealed to be Brina Travis, Hayley and Taylor's mother.
11	4	"Sisters of the Kaiju"	Masayuki Uemoto	Nicole Dubuc	April 19, 2022
In exchange for being given Atlas Destroyer, Shane offers to Drift with Brina in an effort to free her mind; the siblings reluctantly agree, but argue over what to do about Boy and Taylor's unilateral decision to trade Boy for their safety. Shane is chased through Brina's mind by the Sisters who delete everything around him, threatening both Shane and Brina's lives. Using personal information that he'd learned from Drifting with Taylor, Shane manages to gain Brina's trust and ultimately sacrifices himself to get her out. Mei is devastated by Shane's death while Spyder realizes that Shane knew that he wouldn't be coming back and did it to redeem himself to Mei. Spyder provides Mei with a data key Shane had given to him. The data key contains Mei's true memories which Shane preserved after removing them, thus restoring to Mei what he had stolen from her. Hayley and Taylor are finally reunited with their mother, but she doesn't know what had happened to their father after she sacrificed herself to keep Ford from being killed by the Sisters.
12	5	"Mind, Body, Soul"	Susumu Sugai	Greg Johnson	April 19, 2022
Brina struggles against the control of the Sisters' High Priestess while her children argue about rescuing Boy. Brina reveals the Sisters plan to use a transfusion of Kaiju blood to erase Boy's memories and turn him into their messiah. Mei and Spyder bury Shane: the latter offers to take the former with him, but she chooses to stay with the Travises. Hayley is still determined to rescue Boy, so she convinces her mother to help them infiltrate the Sisters' base. Brina gets inside, but is taken over by the High Priestess, who sends her after the others. While Mei grabs Boy, Hayley gets through to her mother, but not before she stabs Taylor, lightly wounding him. The group escapes, but Brina is badly wounded by a Ripper while slowing the Sisters down. They return to Atlas, but are unsure if Boy is still on their side.
13	6	"The Twilight Run"	Masayuki Uemoto	Greg Johnson	April 19, 2022
The group makes it to Sydney Base and the Travis family is reunited again, but this turns out to be an illusion created by Hayley and Loa to help a mortally wounded Brina die peacefully. To help a grieving Taylor, Loa reveals the fate of her old crew and her guilt for not being able to save them. After burying Brina, the group resumes the trek to Sydney, but the Sisters catch up and bewitch Boy, forcing him to attack Atlas. Taylor and Mei try to defend themselves, but Hayley interferes, leaving them vulnerable. Apex, who had sensed Boy's distress, arrives and attempts to restore his memories; but the Sisters push back and turn Boy on the mech. Apex is heavily damaged and cannot fight back, but Atlas recovers and buys the crippled hybrid enough time to finish restoring his friend's memories for them to escape. Boy is upset over the harm he caused Apex before leaving with Atlas for Sydney, which they hope to reach before the pursuing Sisters catch up.
14	7	"Final Approach"	Susumu Sugai	Greg Johnson	April 19, 2022
Chased by the Sisters and the Breacher, a Category VI Kaiju, Hayley, Taylor, Mei, Boy and Atlas Destroyer make a final run for Sydney Base. Detecting their approach, the PPDC's sentries destroy the evil Sisters and most of their forces with a missile barrage while Boy shields the Jaeger from a missile; after Taylor identifies the siblings as the children of Rangers, Marshall Rask calls off the barrage. The High Priestess abducts Boy, but he brutally kills her when she continues to send the Breacher after his friends. Outmatched, Loa ejects Taylor and Hayley and sacrifices herself to use Atlas Destroyer's self-destruct to obliterate the Breacher. The PPDC rescues the group and Hayley and Taylor are finally reunited with their father who welcomes Mei and Boy into the family. As they mourn Brina, Rask explains that the PPDC had found Boy wandering the desert alone and they had learned what he really was shortly before Meridian fell. Hayley reassures Rask that Boy is no longer a Kaiju weapon and the family commemorates the sacrifices of those who got them home.

== Release ==
Pacific Rim: The Black was released on Netflix on March 4, 2021. A teaser trailer was released on February 1, followed by a full trailer on February 5. A final trailer was released on February 26.

== Reception ==
The review aggregator website Rotten Tomatoes reported an 71% approval rating, based on 14 reviews, with an average rating of 7.1/10. The site's critical consensus reads, "While The Black carries over all the grit but little of the humor that distinguishes the Pacific Rim film franchise, its striking visuals and expansion of series lore will likely please Kaiju fans."

== Prequel graphic novel ==
On February 22, 2022, a prequel graphic novel was released for the show. Entitled Pacific Rim: Blackout, it was written by Cavan Scott and illustrated by Nelson Daniel.
