= Mission: Impossible – Fallout (soundtrack) =

Mission: Impossible – Fallout (Music from the Motion Picture)

Film score by Lorne Balfe
- Released: July 13, 2018
- Recorded: 2018
- Genre: Film score
- Length: 1:35:45
- Labels: Paramount Music; La-La Land Records
- Producers: Lorne Balfe; Steffen Thum; Queenie Li

Lorne Balfe chronology
Pacific Rim Uprising (2018)	Mission: Impossible – Fallout (Music from the Motion Picture) (2018)	Georgetown (2019)

Mission: Impossible – Fallout (Music from the Motion Picture) is the score album to the 2018 film Mission: Impossible – Fallout. The sixth installment in the Mission: Impossible film series, starring Tom Cruise, and the sequel to Mission: Impossible – Rogue Nation (2015), the film is directed by Christopher McQuarrie and featured original score composed by Lorne Balfe, in McQuarrie's maiden collaboration and also replacing Joe Kraemer who composed for McQuarrie's previous films, including Rogue Nation. The album was released digitally on July 13, 2018, by Paramount Music, and the physical version of the soundtrack was released by La-La Land Records on September 19.

== Development ==
Lorne Balfe watched all the films of the series to inspire writing the film's music. While he assisted Hans Zimmer, as well as co-producing the score of Dunkirk (2017), that film's producer, Jake Myers, who was also producing Fallout, contacted Balfe to score for the film while Randy Spendlove, CEO of Paramount Music had arranged a meeting with Balfe, McQuarrie and Myers discussing about the music of the film. While McQuarrie discussed about the tone and film's storyline, Balfe had written the music syncing with the narration, and gave a musical ledger describing Ethan's journey, leading him to be on board for the film.

As with all the films from the previous instalments, Lalo Schifrin's themes from the original television series were incorporated into the score. Balfe interpreted himself as a failed percussionist, he always being aware of the musical rhythm produced in the series, saying "Of course you've got that very famous melody, but it's very percussive and it's very rhythmical. And it's the same as when you go back and watch the TV shows, it was very percussive. So I knew that pulse and pace were something that I wanted to delve into more, but also I just wanted to experiment with some of the instrumentation. Like bongos were always in the TV show, and I thought, "Why have one when we can have twelve?" [...] I was just trying to push them to a larger form. So with the bongos, it's hard enough for one bongo player to get a gig these days. For twelve, it's a miracle. It was really being loyal to the past, but bringing it into the future. I think that that's what the movie does."

While scoring for the film, McQuarrie did not use temp music for the film, but instead used Balfe's samples as the temp music. Balfe added that the recording room was next to the editing room, so he could be in contact with editor Eddie Hamilton, who helps him choosing the experimentation constantly while working on the score. In the end credits, the Mission Impossible theme song were recorded by a latin choir, to have the version more loyal to the theme.

== Release history ==
The score was digitally released by Paramount Music on July 13, 2018. La-La Land Records marketed the film's soundtrack in a 2-CD set on September 19, 2018. On June 24, 2019, Mondo announced the vinyl edition of the soundtrack, released in 2-CD set pressed into 180 gram plutonium core colored and black vinyl. It also features a limited flexi-disc, featuring an unreleased track titled "It's Possible". The pre-orders for the soundtrack began on June 26, and eventually released on July 19.

== Reception ==
Lorne Balfe's musical score received mixed response, though some critics praised it as an "epic and inspiring score". Vanity Fair's Richard Lawson and Polygon's Matt Patches compared the score to that of Christopher Nolan's films; the latter drew comparison to Hans Zimmer's score for The Dark Knight trilogy. Peter Debruge of Variety opined that the "signature, pulse-quickening score is reinvented here in brilliant ways, with completely surprising instruments and orchestrations that barely allow a moment's calm". CinemaBlend's Conner Schwerdtfeger wrote "a booming score by Lorne Balfe that evolves the legendary Mission: Impossible theme in almost every way".

However, Zanobard Reviews gave 4/10 to the album, calling it as "bland"; whereas James Southall of Movie Wave was also critical of the score, calling it as "fiercely, oppressively boring", although he later backtracked on this opinion, considering it "riveting" and writing that he "had madly written it off at the time". Jonathan Broxton wrote "it's not the fact that Balfe uses rhythms rather than melodies, or the fact that there is just as much synth as there is orchestra, that is the problem. It's the fact that, too often, the music feels lifeless. There's so much scope for there to be wonderfully complicated and invigorating percussion patterns driving the action along, for there to be cool and ballsy brass combinations, and for the strings to do more than simply chug along in basic repetitive ostinatos, but Balfe almost never seizes the opportunity. Ever since it first debuted in the 1960s Mission: Impossible has been about swaggering cool, and the almost complete lack of that in this score is what ultimately makes it so disappointing." Filmtracks.com wrote "Balfe's approach to Mission: Impossible - Fallout provided the director with the dumbed-down attitude he desired, and some listeners will find the score to be a satisfying RC-inspired romp".

Soundtrack World wrote "the music has gone into a direction where it does not fit with the iconic theme by Schifrin". In a positive note, Caleb Burnett of Set the Tape wrote "Lorne Balfe does a fine job with his score for the latest entry in the Mission: Impossible series. It would be difficult to argue that he did not make it his own and compose something fresh and new for the franchise, whilst concurrently utilising the iconic music that has made this franchise famous to thrill audiences like any Mission story should. The score is certainly a different, yet ultimately worthy addition to the scores of the Mission: Impossible series."

== Track listing ==
All music is composed by Lorne Balfe.

No.	Title	Length
1.	"A Storm is Coming"	1:12
2.	"Your Mission^{[a]}"	2:14
3.	"Should You Choose to Accept..."	2:34
4.	"The Manifesto"	1:44
5.	"Good Evening, Mr. Hunt^{[a]}"	4:19
6.	"Change of Plan"	5:47
7.	"A Terrible Choice"	2:54
8.	"Fallout^{[a]}"	1:30
9.	"Stairs and Rooftops^{[a]}"	6:00
10.	"No Hard Feelings"	4:20
11.	"Free Fall^{[a]}"	4:14
12.	"The White Widow^{[a]}"	4:42
13.	"I Am the Storm"	2:07
14.	"The Exchange^{[a]}"	5:54
15.	"Steps Ahead^{[b]}"	1:02
16.	"Escape Through Paris^{[b]}"	5:05
17.	"We Are Never Free"	6:57
18.	"Kashmir^{[b]}"	4:29
19.	"Fate Whispers to the Warrior^{[c]}"	3:54
20.	"And the Warrior Whispers Back^{[c]}"	3:56
21.	"Unfinished Business^{[a]}"	1:49
22.	"Scalpel and Hammer"	5:10
23.	"The Syndicate"	6:00
24.	"Cutting on One"	3:42
25.	"The Last Resort^{[a]}"	2:55
26.	"Mission: Accomplished^{[a]}"	1:15
Total length:		1:35:45

== Chart performance ==
Chart (2018)	Peak position
UK Soundtrack Albums (OCC)	29

== Notes ==
- ^{^a} Contains an interpolation of "The Mission: Impossible Theme" composed by Lalo Schifrin
- ^{^b} Contains an interpolation of "The Plot" composed by Lalo Schifrin
- ^{^c} Contains an interpolation of The Mission: Impossible Theme and "The Plot"
