= Pacific Rim (soundtrack) =

Pacific Rim: Original Motion Picture Soundtrack

Soundtrack album / Film score by Ramin Djawadi
- Released: June 18, 2013 (digital download from Amazon.com); June 25, 2013 (CD release); July 9, 2013 (physical version)
- Genre: Film score
- Length: 57:41
- Labels: WaterTower; Sony Classical
- Producer: Ramin Djawadi

Ramin Djawadi chronology
Game of Thrones: Season 3 (2013)	Pacific Rim: Original Motion Picture Soundtrack (2013)	Person of Interest: Season 2 (2014)

Pacific Rim chronology
Pacific Rim (2013)	Pacific Rim: Uprising (2018)

Singles from Pacific Rim
- 1. "Drift" Released: July 22, 2013 (digital download from iTunes.com); 2. "Just Like Your Tenderness" Released: 2013

Professional ratings
Review scores
Source	Rating
The Action Elite	5/5 stars
Empire	4/5 stars
Filmtracks	4/5 stars
Mania.com	A
Movie Wave	3.5/5 stars
MSN Entertainment	4/5 stars

Pacific Rim: Original Motion Picture Soundtrack is the soundtrack to the film of the same name. It was released on digital download from Amazon.com on June 18, 2013, and CD June 25, 2013. The physical version of the soundtrack was released on July 9, 2013, three days before the theatrical release of the film itself.

The film's score was composed by Ramin Djawadi, with guest musicians Tom Morello and Priscilla Ahn. In addition, the orchestra for the soundtrack consisted of over 100 musicians, including a Russian choir.

Director Guillermo del Toro selected Djawadi based on his work on Prison Break, Iron Man, and Game of Thrones, stating: "His scores have a grandeur, but they have also an incredible sort of human soul." The director also stated that some Russian rap would be featured in the film.

== Track listing ==
All music is composed by Ramin Djawadi

No.	Title	Length
1.	"Pacific Rim"	4:53
2.	"Gipsy Danger"	3:18
3.	"Canceling the Apocalypse"	3:37
4.	"Just a Memory"	2:07
5.	"2500 Tons of Awesome"	1:05
6.	"The Shatterdome"	2:30
7.	"Mako"	4:23
8.	"Call Me Newt"	1:42
9.	"Jaeger Tech"	1:58
10.	"To Fight Monsters, We Created Monsters"	2:03
11.	"Better Than New"	1:42
12.	"We Are the Resistance"	1:49
13.	"Double Event"	2:27
14.	"Striker Eureka"	1:55
15.	"Physical Compatibility"	2:31
16.	"Category 5"	2:15
17.	"Pentecost"	2:11
18.	"Go Big or Go Extinct"	2:24
19.	"Hannibal Chau"	1:33
20.	"For My Family"	1:57
21.	"No Pulse"	0:58
22.	"Kaiju Groupie"	1:15
23.	"Deep Beneath the Pacific"	1:56
24.	"The Breach"	3:14
25.	"We Need a New Weapon"	1:40
Total length:		57:41

Music appearing in the film and not included on the soundtrack

#	Title	Performer(s)
1	"Just Like Your Tenderness"	Luo Xiaoxuan
2	"Drift"	Blake Perlman feat. Rza

== Personnel ==
Primary artist

- Ramin Djawadi – composer, producer

Conductors

- Nick Glennie-Smith
- Jasper Randall

Orchestrators

- Stephen Coleman
- Tony Blondal
- Andrew Kinney

Additional personnel and recording

- Tom Morello – guitar (tracks 1, 9, 18, 21)
- Priscilla Ahn – vocals (track 7)

== Instrumentation ==
- Strings: 38 violins, 13 violas, 16 cellos, 10 double basses, 1 harp
- Woodwind: 1 flute
- Brass: 17 French Horns, 5 trumpets, 10 trombones, 4 tubas
- 4 players on Percussion and 22 members on Male Choir

== Critical response ==
The soundtrack was met with mostly positive reviews. Danny Graydon of Empire rated it four out of five stars, saying, "Ramin Djawadi employs the same muscular stylings that made his Iron Man score so enjoyable." Sherman Yang of MSN Entertainment gave it a score of four out of five, commenting that "The excellent mix of orchestral and electronic elements makes the title track a perfect start to what one hopes would be a jaw-dropping movie." Filmtracks also gave the soundtrack four out of five stars, commenting that "Pacific Rim is for Djawadi what 2004's Catwoman was for Klaus Badelt, a score maligned because of its ingredients and Media Ventures/Remote Control origins despite containing a remarkable amount of thematic development and appropriate style for the subject matter." James Southall of Movie Wave gave it three-and-a-half out of five stars, commenting that "The guitars, ostinato-based action and even the HORN OF DOOM which make up the opening track may be nothing fresh, but the composer pulls the familiar elements together better than any of his Remote Control peers (including the big boss) have done in a few years." Robert T. Trate of Mania.com gave the soundtrack a grade of A, calling it "a complete kick-ass thrill ride that has the muscle to back it up. Yet, with all the giant monsters and robots, it never loses sight of the heart behind its characters." The Action Elite gave the album a perfect five stars, calling it "A pulse pounding adrenaline rush of music which maintains a theme tune and heart all the way through it."

== Chart positions ==
Chart (2013)	Peak position
US Billboard Top Soundtracks	7
