= Pacific Rim Uprising =

2018 film by Steven S. DeKnight

- Theatrical release poster
- Directed by: Steven S. DeKnight
- Written by: Steven S. DeKnight; Emily Carmichael; Kira Snyder; T. S. Nowlin
- Based on: Characters by Travis Beacham
- Produced by: Mary Parent; Cale Boyter; Guillermo del Toro; John Boyega; Femi Oguns; Thomas Tull; Jon Jashni
- Starring: John Boyega; Scott Eastwood; Jing Tian; Cailee Spaeny; Rinko Kikuchi; Burn Gorman; Adria Arjona; Max Zhang; Charlie Day
- Cinematography: Dan Mindel
- Edited by: Zach Staenberg; Dylan Highsmith; Josh Schaeffer
- Music by: Lorne Balfe
- Production companies: Legendary Pictures; Double Dare You; UpperRoom Productions
- Distributed by: Universal Pictures
- Release dates: March 21, 2018 (TCL Chinese Theatre); March 23, 2018 (United States)
- Running time: 111 minutes
- Country: United States
- Language: English
- Budget: $150–176 million (Note: Box Office Mojo reported the film's budget to be $150 million. Deadline Hollywood reported the budget to be $155 million but also noted that other analysts marked the budget at $176 million.)
- Box office: $291 million

Pacific Rim Uprising is a 2018 American mecha monster action film, the sequel to Pacific Rim (2013). The film was directed by Steven S. DeKnight, and written by DeKnight, Emily Carmichael, Kira Snyder, and T. S. Nowlin. The ensemble cast includes John Boyega, Scott Eastwood, Cailee Spaeny, Jing Tian, Adria Arjona and Zhang Jin, with Rinko Kikuchi, Charlie Day, and Burn Gorman returning from the original film. Set ten years after the events of the first film, Pacific Rim Uprising sees former pilot and Marshal Stacker Pentecost's son, Jake, returning to the Pan Pacific Defense Corps to stop a renewed Kaiju threat. Principal photography began in November 2016 in Queensland, Australia.

Pacific Rim Uprising premiered in Hollywood, on March 15, 2018, and was released in the United States on March 23, by Universal Pictures. It received mixed reviews from critics and was largely deemed inferior to the original film. With a gross of only $291 million against a $150–176 million budget, it was considered a box-office disappointment. It was followed by an animated television series in 2021.

== Plot ==
In 2035, ten years after the events of the previous film, the Jaeger Program has been reinstated under the leadership of Senator Mako Mori, who runs the Pan Pacific Defense Corps (PPDC). Former Jaeger pilot Jake Pentecost, son of Stacker Pentecost, survives by stealing and selling Jaeger parts on the black market in Santa Monica, California. After tracking a disabled Jaeger's power core to the workshop of fifteen-year-old Jaeger enthusiast Amara Namani, Jake is arrested alongside her following a confrontation between Amara's single-pilot Jaeger Scrapper and the law-enforcement Jaeger November Ajax. Mako persuades Jake to return to the PPDC as an instructor instead of facing prison, with Amara joining his recruits.

At the China Shatterdome, Jake trains Jaeger cadets alongside his estranged former co-pilot, Nathan "Nate" Lambert. Mako and Nate explain that the Jaeger programme faces competition from Shao Industries' drone programme, which aims to mass-produce remotely operated Jaegers developed by CEO Liwen Shao and Dr Newton "Newt" Geiszler. Mako is scheduled to give a final assessment of the drones at a PPDC council meeting in Sydney. Before she can do so, the rogue Jaeger Obsidian Fury attacks the city. During the ensuing battle with Jake and Nate's Gipsy Avenger, Mako is killed, while Obsidian Fury escapes into the ocean. The PPDC council subsequently authorises immediate deployment of the drones.

Just before her death, Mako transmits the location of a defunct Jaeger production facility in Severnaya Zemlya. Jake and Nate investigate in Gipsy Avenger, but Obsidian Fury destroys the facility and attacks them. Although initially outmatched, Gipsy Avenger destroys the rogue Jaeger. Examination of its control module reveals that it was operated not by a human, but by a Kaiju secondary brain that had been grown on Earth.

When the drones are deployed, cloned Kaiju brains secretly installed aboard them take control. The resulting Kaiju-Jaeger hybrids attack the Shatterdomes, destroying or disabling most of the Jaegers and causing heavy casualties. While trying to sabotage the drones, Dr Hermann Gottlieb discovers that Newt is responsible. His mind has been influenced by the Precursors, the creators of the Kaiju, after he previously drifted with Kaiju brains. Under their control, Newt commands the hybrids to open multiple breaches across the Pacific Rim and reveals that he implanted the brains in both the drones and Obsidian Fury.

Liwen activates a failsafe that destroys the drones and closes the breaches, but three Kaiju—Hakuja, Shrikethorn and Raijin—have already emerged and reached Tokyo. Hermann and the others realise that the Precursors intend to use the Kaiju's reactive blood to detonate Mount Fuji. This would trigger eruptions along the Ring of Fire, releasing volcanic matter into the atmosphere, causing an extinction event and simultaneously terraforming Earth for Precursor colonization.

The cadets are mobilised while Hermann and Liwen repair Gipsy Avenger and three salvageable Jaegers: Bracer Phoenix, Saber Athena and Guardian Bravo. Hermann develops rockets powered by Kaiju blood, enabling the team to reach Tokyo. The Jaegers initially repel the Kaiju, but Newt combines them into a "Mega-Kaiju" using robotic parasites from one of Liwen's factories. The Mega-Kaiju destroys or severely damages the three other Jaegers and injures Nate. Jake and Amara take over the pursuit, while Liwen remotely pilots Scrapper and attaches a rocket to Gipsy Avenger, sending both Jaegers into the atmosphere before they free-fall towards Earth. Jake and Amara transfer to Scrapper as Gipsy Avenger collides with and kills the Mega-Kaiju.

Newt attempts to activate a backup plan but is knocked unconscious and captured by Nate. When Jake confronts the imprisoned Newt, Newt warns that the Precursors will return. Jake responds that humanity is preparing to take the fight to them.

== Cast ==
- John Boyega as Jake Pentecost, the son of Stacker Pentecost, the adoptive younger brother of Mako, and Nate and Amara's partner.
- Scott Eastwood as Nathan "Nate" Lambert, Jake's estranged co-pilot and partner who piloted the Gipsy Avenger.
- Jing Tian as Liwen Shao, a businesswoman and technologist who joins the PPDC against the Precursor Emissary.
- Cailee Spaeny as Amara Namani, a street orphan who created a civilian Jaeger, Scrapper, and piloted the Jaeger Bracer Phoenix. She later becomes Jake's partner after Nate is injured by the Mega-Kaiju.
  - Madeleine McGraw as Young Amara
- Rinko Kikuchi as Mako Mori, the adoptive older sister of Jake and the former pilot of Gipsy Danger who is now the secretary general of the reorganized PPDC and the senator of Japan working with Hermann.
- Burn Gorman as Hermann Gottlieb, a scientist and officer who stayed and continued to work in PPDC with Mako.
- Adria Arjona as Jules Reyes, an officer of the PPDC.
- Max Zhang as Marshal Quan Chenglei, a commanding officer in the PPDC.
- Charlie Day as Dr. Newton "Newt" Geiszler, the true main antagonist and a former scientist and officer in the PPDC who becomes the emissary of the Precursors after his mind is possessed by them.
- Wesley Wong as Ou-Yang Jinhai, Viktoriya and Amara's partner and cadet who piloted the Jaeger Bracer Phoenix.
- Karan Brar as Suresh Khuran, Ilya's partner and cadet who piloted the Jaeger Guardian Bravo.
- Ivanna Sakhno as Viktoriya Malikova, Ou-Yang's partner, a cadet who piloted the Jaeger Bracer Phoenix and starts out as Amara's rival.
- Mackenyu as Ryoichi Hatayama, Renata's partner and cadet who piloted the Jaeger Saber Athena.
- Lily Ji as Meilin Gao, a cadet in the PPDC.
- Shyrley Rodriguez as Renata Gutierrez, Ryoichi's partner who piloted the Jaeger Saber Athena.
- Rahart Adams as Tahima Shaheen, a cadet in the PPDC.
- Levi Meaden as Ilya Zaslavsky, Suresh's partner and cadet who piloted the Jaeger Guardian Bravo.
- Director Steven S. DeKnight cameos as a PPDC general on a recruitment banner.

== Production ==
=== Development ===
In 2012, prior to the first film's release, del Toro noted that he had ideas for a sequel, adding in 2014 that he had been working on a script with Zak Penn for several months. In June 2014, del Toro stated that he would direct the sequel, and the film's distribution was taken over by Universal Pictures. In July 2015, it was reported that filming was expected to begin in November, though production was halted following conflicts between Universal and Legendary. As the sequel's future became unclear, Universal indefinitely delayed the film. Still determined to have the film made, del Toro kept working and by that October announced that he had presented the studio with a script and a budget.

After the sale of Legendary to Chinese Wanda Group for $3.5 billion, observers noted an increased likelihood of Pacific Rim 2's production being revitalized because the first film was so successful in China.

In February 2016, the studio, and del Toro himself via Twitter, announced that Steven S. DeKnight would take over directing duties, with a new script written by Jon Spaihts, marking DeKnight's feature directorial debut. Del Toro remained on the project as a producer. Del Toro revealed he left the film once the studio lost their reservations to the Toronto sound stages where the first film had been shot, as he was not willing to move to China to film the sequel given he would remain in the city to work in The Shape of Water. Derek Connolly was brought in on May 12, 2016, to rewrite the script again.

=== Casting ===
Cast announcements began in June 2016, with John Boyega accepting a role, and news that Scott Eastwood was in talks appearing later that month. Further announcements took place in September and November. A notable absence from the cast was Charlie Hunnam, who could not join the project because of his scheduling conflicts with King Arthur: Legend of the Sword.

=== Filming ===
Principal photography on the film began on November 9, 2016, in Australia. On December 14, 2016, the official title was revealed to be Pacific Rim Uprising. In January 2017, John Boyega was photographed in his costume in Sydney. In February 2017, three new Jaegers for the film were revealed. On March 8, 2017, filming started in China. The Battle of Tokyo sequence was filmed in Seoul and Busan in South Korea using drones. Filming was completed on March 30, 2017.

=== Visual effects ===
The visual effects were done by DNEG (Double Negative), Atomic Fiction, Blind LTD and Territory Studio, with Peter Chiang and Jim Berney serving as visual effects supervisors. Production designer Stefan Dechant tried to push "the look and the feel" of the Jaegers, stating that while in the original film they resembled tanks, the new generation of robots tried to be more like a fighter jet, adding more speed and strength and combining them into one. The robots became more acrobatic and had silhouettes and color schemes that allowed them to become distinct and recognizable. Artists from Industrial Light & Magic, who made the effects in the first film, helped develop Gipsy Avenger, a "sleek and advanced" upgraded version of Gipsy Danger which DeKnight often compared to the USS Enterprise in being "awe-inspiring" given its status as the Jaeger flagship.

== Music ==
Composer John Paesano was originally slated to be writing the score for the film, replacing the first film's composer Ramin Djawadi. However, in January 2018, it was announced that Paesano had been replaced by Lorne Balfe, who recorded his score at Synchron Stage in Vienna. The soundtrack was digitally released on March 23, 2018, by Milan Records with the physical format being released later on April 6, 2018.

== Release ==
=== Theatrical ===
Pacific Rim Uprising premiered on March 21, 2018, at the TCL Chinese Theatre in Hollywood, Los Angeles. It was initially scheduled for released on April 7, 2017, but was later pushed back to August 4, 2017, then February 23, 2018, and finally March 23, 2018.

=== Home media ===
Pacific Rim Uprising was released on Digital on June 5, 2018. A 4K Blu-ray, a Blu-ray 3D, a Blu-ray and a DVD was released on June 19, 2018.

== Reception ==
=== Box office ===
Pacific Rim Uprising grossed $59.9 million in the United States and Canada, and $231.1 million in other territories, for a worldwide total of $291 million, against a production budget of about $150 million. Deadline Hollywood estimated that the film would have needed to gross $350 to $450 million to break even.

In the United States and Canada, the film was released alongside Midnight Sun, Sherlock Gnomes, Unsane, and Paul, Apostle of Christ, and was projected to gross $22–29 million from 3,703 theaters in its opening weekend. The film made $2.35 million from Thursday night previews, down from the original's $3.5 million, and $10.4 million on its first day (including previews). It went on to debut to $28 million, becoming the first film to dethrone Black Panther (which made $16.7 million in its sixth week) for the top spot. It fell 67% to $9.2 million in its second weekend, finishing 5th.

In Korea, the film ranked first on March 22, with 82,486 admissions. In China, the film opened at number one, grossing $21.36 million on its first day and $25.84 million on its second, for a two-day gross of $48.59 million. It went on to have a debut of $65 million in the country, as well as $6.9 million in Korea, $6.8 million in Russia and $4.9 million in Mexico, for an international opening weekend of $122.5 million.

=== Critical response ===
On the review aggregator website Rotten Tomatoes, 42% of 262 critics' reviews are positive, with an average rating of 5.0/10. The website's consensus reads: "Pacific Rim Uprising won't win any points for subtlety or originality, but it delivers enough of the rock 'em-sock 'em robots-vs.-kaiju thrills that fans of the original will be looking for." Metacritic, which uses a weighted average, assigned the film a score of 45 out of 100, based on 44 critics, indicating "mixed or average" reviews. Audiences polled by CinemaScore gave the film an average grade of "B" on an A+ to F scale, with PostTrak reporting filmgoers gave it an overall positive score of 76%.

Mark Kennedy of the Associated Press called the film "cheer-at-the-screen fun" and awarded it 3.5 out of 4 stars, lauding Boyega's performance and his chemistry with Spaeny, while also commending DeKnight for using daylight instead of the rainy night settings of del Toro. Ethan Sacks of New York Daily News gave the film 3 out of 5 stars, and was also positive of Boyega's and Spaeny's performances, comparing Boyega's character to Han Solo. However, he criticized the dense backstories of the characters, noting that, "a movie about massive monster-fighting robots doesn't need so much engineering".

Richard Roeper of the Chicago Sun-Times gave the film 2 out of 4 stars, saying: "The climactic battle drags on forever and looks like a high-tech update of a monster movie clash of the titans from a half-century ago. Even the sight of the residents of Tokyo scrambling for their lives as a giant lizard monster stomps through the city serves only as a reminder we're sitting through a glorified B-movie with nothing new to say." David Ehrlich of IndieWire gave the film a "C−", calling it a "generic and diverting sequel that corrects some of the original's biggest mistakes while also highlighting some of its more eccentric charms".

Cary Darling of the Houston Chronicle gave it 1.5 out of 5 stars and called it the worst film of 2018 so far, being especially critical of its bland premise and pandering attempt at international marketability. Darling concluded, "Pacific Rim Uprising is a lot like the city-crunching monsters it stars: big, loud and as dull-witted as Homer Simpson roused from a medically induced coma. It's a rote, paint-by-numbers blockbuster that would be offensive in its mediocrity if it also weren't so relentlessly uninspired," and "all that's left is the robot brawling and the marketing." Ignatiy Vishnevetsky of The A.V. Club called the film an "impersonal sequel", stating, "simply put, it lacks its predecessor's curiosity about its world—its fascination with colorful backdrops and machines. Del Toro's movie [...] had an idealistic vision for its anime-influenced hobby-store pursuits [...] Pacific Rim Uprising offers only its spare parts." Similarly, Mick LaSalle of the San Francisco Chronicle noted that "DeKnight doesn't attempt to invest his monsters with majesty, the way Guillermo del Toro did in the previous film. With DeKnight it's just a lot of pounding, smashing and driving, purely functional".

=== Accolades ===
Pacific Rim Uprising was nominated in two categories at the 2018 Golden Trailer Awards: "Untouchable" (Inside Job) for Best Music and "Pacific Rim Uprising" (AV Squad) for Best Sound Editing. At the 2018 Teen Choice Awards, it received nominations for Choice Action Movie and Choice Action Movie Actor (Boyega).

== Franchise ==
=== Possible sequel ===
In October 2017, five months before the film's release, DeKnight stated "If enough people show up to this, we've already talked about the plot of the third movie, and how the end of the third movie would expand the universe to a Star Wars/Star Trek-style [franchise or series] where you can go in many, many different directions... You can go main canon, you can go spin-offs, you can go one-offs. Yeah, that's the plan." DeKnight also talked about the possibility of a crossover with the MonsterVerse; co-writer T.S. Nowlin was a member of the writers' room for Godzilla vs. Kong. In January 2021, del Toro stated he had "no plans to return" for a third film. In December 2024, Steven S. DeKnight revealed details of a scrapped multiverse-based concept for an unmade sequel and said that he would like to see del Toro return to direct a future installment.

=== Animated series ===
On November 8, 2018, Netflix announced Pacific Rim: The Black, an original anime series that expands upon the story and universe of the two live-action films. The first seven-episode season was released on March 4, 2021, the second and final season was released on April 19, 2022.

== Other media ==
=== Comic book ===
Legendary Comics released Pacific Rim: Aftermath on January 17, 2018. The six-issue comic book series serves as a bridge between the two films.

=== Novelization ===
On March 13, Titan Books released Pacific Rim Uprising: Ascension, a prequel novel written by Greg Keyes.
