= Pacific Rim (video game) =

2013 video game

- Xbox Live Arcade cover art
- Developer: Yuke's
- Publisher: Yuke's
- Platforms: Xbox 360 (Xbox Live Arcade), PlayStation 3 (PlayStation Network)
- Release: Xbox 360: WW: 12 July 2013; PlayStation 3: NA: 15 October 2013; EU: 6 November 2013
- Genre: Fighting
- Modes: Single-player, multiplayer

Pacific Rim was a 2013 fighting game developed and published by Yuke's for Xbox 360 via Xbox Live Arcade and PlayStation 3 via PlayStation Network based on the 2013 film of the same name. The game was delisted from both digital stores and platforms in 2016.

The game was first announced by the Australian Classification Board. A NeoGAF user posted several screenshots from the game, showing the monsters and robots of the movie battling in a number of environments.

== Gameplay ==
In single-player mode, the player engages in several one-on-one melee battles to earn achievement points and upgrades for their characters. Jaegers have two health bars (as they require two pilots) while Kaijus have one.

== Reception ==
The game was met with mixed to negative reviews. It has a Metacritic score of 39 out of 100, based on 14 reviews. Jake Magee of IGN gave it a mediocre rating of 5.3, calling it "a flimsy movie tie-in that chooses to concentrate on repetitive and nonsensical story missions." Ben Rayner of Xboxer360 gave it a score of 60 out of 100, calling it "a 'freemium' game disguised as an XBLA game."

== Pacific Rim: The Mobile Game ==
Pacific Rim: The Mobile Game
- Developers: Reliance Games; Behaviour Interactive
- Publisher: Reliance Games
- Platforms: iOS; Android
- Release: July 12, 2013
- Genre: Action role-playing
- Mode: Single-player

Pacific Rim: The Mobile Game was a 2013 video game developed by Reliance Games and Behaviour Interactive for iOS and Android smartphone platforms. According to Reliance Games' chief executive Manish Agarwal, the game is set before the events of the film, and the company worked extensively with director Guillermo del Toro in the game's design and testing. It was delisted from the App Store in 2016.

=== Gameplay ===
During battle, the player uses the on-screen buttons to block or dodge a Kaiju attack. Once the Kaiju gives an opening, the player swipes the screen to execute an attack. The campaign spans 30 missions, with the player earning cash to upgrade their Jaeger by changing parts or buying single-use power-ups. Cash can also be collected to buy more powerful Jaegers.

=== Reception ===
Much like its console counterpart, Pacific Rim: The Mobile Game did not fare well with critics. The iOS version has a Metacritic score of 48 out of 100, based on 12 reviews. Mike Fahey of Kotaku criticized the game for its lack of innovation, saying it "isn't a bad Infinity Blade-style mobile game. It's just another one." Scott Nichols of Digital Spy gave the game two out of five stars, commenting that it is "priced at a premium, making the free-to-play structure rather insulting to fans."

== See also ==
- List of Kaiju related games
