= Pacific Rim (film) =

2013 film by Guillermo del Toro

- Theatrical release poster
- Directed by: Guillermo del Toro
- Screenplay by: Travis Beacham; Guillermo del Toro
- Story by: Travis Beacham
- Produced by: Guillermo del Toro; Thomas Tull; Jon Jashni; Mary Parent
- Starring: Charlie Hunnam; Idris Elba; Rinko Kikuchi; Charlie Day; Rob Kazinsky; Max Martini; Ron Perlman
- Cinematography: Guillermo Navarro
- Edited by: John Gilroy; Peter Amundson
- Music by: Ramin Djawadi
- Production companies: Legendary Pictures; Double Dare You
- Distributed by: Warner Bros. Pictures
- Release dates: July 1, 2013 (Mexico City); July 12, 2013 (United States)
- Running time: 132 minutes
- Country: United States
- Language: English
- Budget: $190 million
- Box office: $411 million

Pacific Rim (Note: Officially billed as Warner Bros. Pictures and Legendary Pictures Pacific Rim) is a 2013 American military science fiction and monster film directed by Guillermo del Toro, with a screenplay written by Travis Beacham with del Toro and story written by Beacham. It is the first film in the Pacific Rim franchise. The film stars Charlie Hunnam, Idris Elba, Rinko Kikuchi, Charlie Day, Robert Kazinsky, Max Martini, and Ron Perlman. The film is set in the future, when Earth is at war with the Kaiju, (Note: The name of the monsters comes from the Japanese word kaijū (怪獣, 'strange creature, monster'). Japanese lacks a plural form for its words, but it is often common for Japanese loanwords into English to receive English-style pluralization. Travis Beacham has said that he believes both kaiju and kaijus to be correct within the film's universe, although he prefers the former.) colossal sea monsters which have emerged from an interdimensional portal on the bottom of the Pacific Ocean. To combat the monsters, humanity unites to create the Jaegers, (Note: The name of the mechas comes from the German word Jäger ('hunter'). In German, the plural form for this word occurs in the definite article rather than as a suffix to the word itself (der Jäger is 'the hunter'; die Jäger is 'the hunters'). As this is an English-language film, it specifically uses the plural jaegers.) gigantic humanoid mechas, each controlled by two co-pilots whose minds are joined by a mental link called the Drift.

Principal photography began on November 14, 2011, in Toronto and lasted through to April 2012. The film was produced by Legendary Pictures and distributed by Warner Bros. Pictures. It was released on July 12, 2013, in 3D, RealD 3D, IMAX 3D and 4DX, receiving generally positive reviews from critics, who praised its performances, direction, storyline, action sequences, visual effects, musical score, and nostalgic style. While it underperformed at the box office in the United States, it was highly successful in other markets, thus becoming a box office success. It earned a worldwide total of $411 million—earning $136 million in China alone, its largest market—becoming Del Toro's most commercially successful film. The film is regarded as an homage to kaiju, mecha, and anime media.

A sequel titled Pacific Rim Uprising was released on March 23, 2018, with Universal Pictures as the film's distributor.

== Plot ==
In 2013, colossal extraterrestrials called Kaiju emerge from an interdimensional portal called the Breach at the bottom of the Pacific Ocean and begin to attack coastal cities along the Pacific Rim. In response, humanity constructs massive mecha called Jaegers; each is co-piloted by two or more people who share the mental stress of piloting the machine through a mental link called the Drift.

In 2020, brothers Yancy and Raleigh Becket pilot the Jaeger Gipsy Danger to defend Anchorage. A Kaiju named Knifehead severely damages Gipsy and kills Yancy. Raleigh manages to kill Knifehead by blasting her with Gipsy's plasma cannon, but is traumatized by his brother's death and the stress of solo-piloting the Jaeger, causing him to quit the program.

Five years later, world leaders divert funding from the Jaeger program in favor of coastal defense walls due to resurgent Kaiju attacks and the rapid attrition of Jaegers. However, the walls are soon proven ineffective when a Kaiju named Mutavore breaks through the wall in Sydney before he is brought down by Jaeger Striker Eureka, piloted by father-son duo Herc and Chuck Hansen. The remaining Jaegers are relocated to the Shatterdome in Hong Kong under Marshal Stacker Pentecost.

Raleigh, now working on constructing the wall, is convinced by Pentecost to rejoin the Jaeger program and is brought to Hong Kong, where he meets Mako Mori, director of the Jaeger restoration program. Only four Jaegers, including Gipsy Danger and Striker Eureka, remain. Pentecost informs Raleigh of his plan to destroy the Breach by detonating a tactical nuclear weapon inside it.

Raleigh searches for a new co-pilot and finds Mako is compatible. During their first test in Gipsy Danger, Mako loses alignment while recalling a Kaiju attack by a crab-like kajiu named Onibaba during her childhood, nearly discharging Gipsy's plasma cannon inside the Shatterdome. Consequently, Pentecost suspends Mako. Raleigh protests, having seen through Mako's memories that Pentecost had adopted and raised Mako after her parents died, and suggests that the real reason for Pentecost suspending Mako was to protect her, but Pentecost remains unswayed.

Pentecost consults Kaiju experts Newton Geiszler and Hermann Gottlieb. Hermann predicts that while Kaiju attacks will increase in size and frequency, the Breach will soon be stable enough to permit passage of the bomb. Disregarding Pentecost's orders, Newton drifts with a Kaiju's brain, learning that they are bioweapons created by an alien race to help colonize Earth. At Pentecost's instruction, Newton meets with Hannibal Chau, the leader of a black market organization selling Kaiju body parts. During the meeting, two Kaiju named Leatherback and Otachi are sent through the Breach; Hannibal deduces that the aliens accessed Newton's memories during the drift, which prompted the two Kaiju to attack Hong Kong in search of him.

All remaining Jaegers aside from Gipsy Danger intervene, but two are destroyed, Striker Eureka is disabled with an EMP blast, and Herc is injured. Mako is reinstated and the nuclear-powered Gipsy, immune to EMPs, manages to eliminate both Kaiju (leatherback by being shot by the plasmacaster and Otachi by being Sliced in half with Gipsy's sword). Newton and Hannibal attempt to harvest Otachi's brain but discover that she was pregnant; the infant Kaiju bursts out, devouring Hannibal before strangling himself with his umbilical cord. Newton and Hermann drift with the infant's brain, discovering that the Breach only opens if it detects Kaiju DNA.

Pentecost reveals to Raleigh that he has radiation poisoning from excessive Jaeger piloting. Although doing so again would prove fatal to him, Pentecost resolves to co-pilot Striker in the injured Herc's stead. As Gipsy and Striker approach the Breach, three new Kaiju named Rajiu, Scunner and Slattern appear to stop them, the latter being the largest and most powerful Kaiju encountered yet. Gipsy kills Rajiu, but is severely damaged. Pentecost and Chuck sacrifice themselves by detonating their nuclear warhead, killing Scunner. Gipsy manages to kill the wounded Slattern and rides the Kaiju's corpse into the Breach. Raleigh ejects Mako from Gipsy, triggers a meltdown in the Jaeger's nuclear reactor, and ejects before its detonation seals the Breach. Their escape pods surface as rescue helicopters arrive, and humanity celebrates the defeat of the Kaiju.

== Cast ==
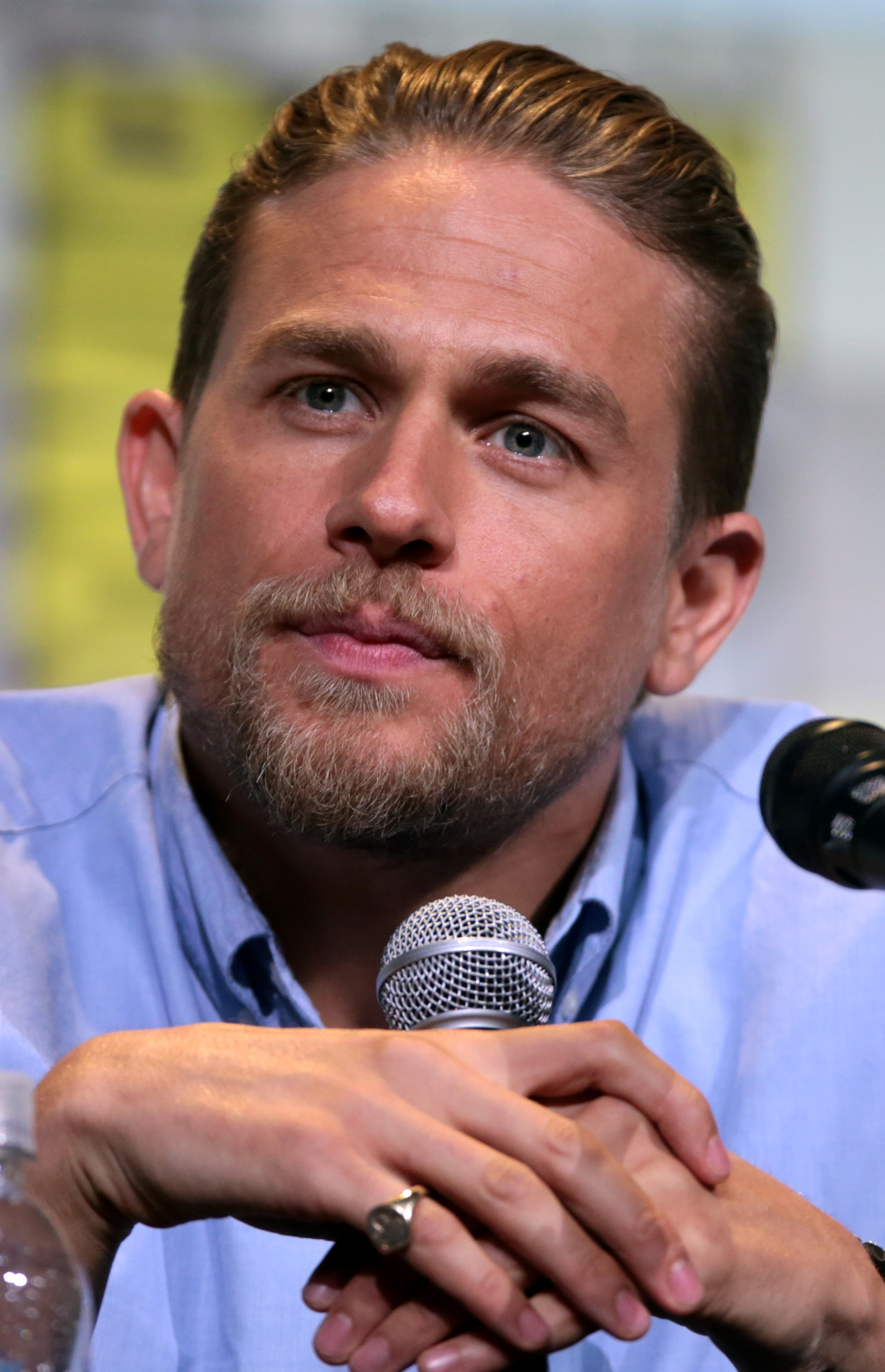
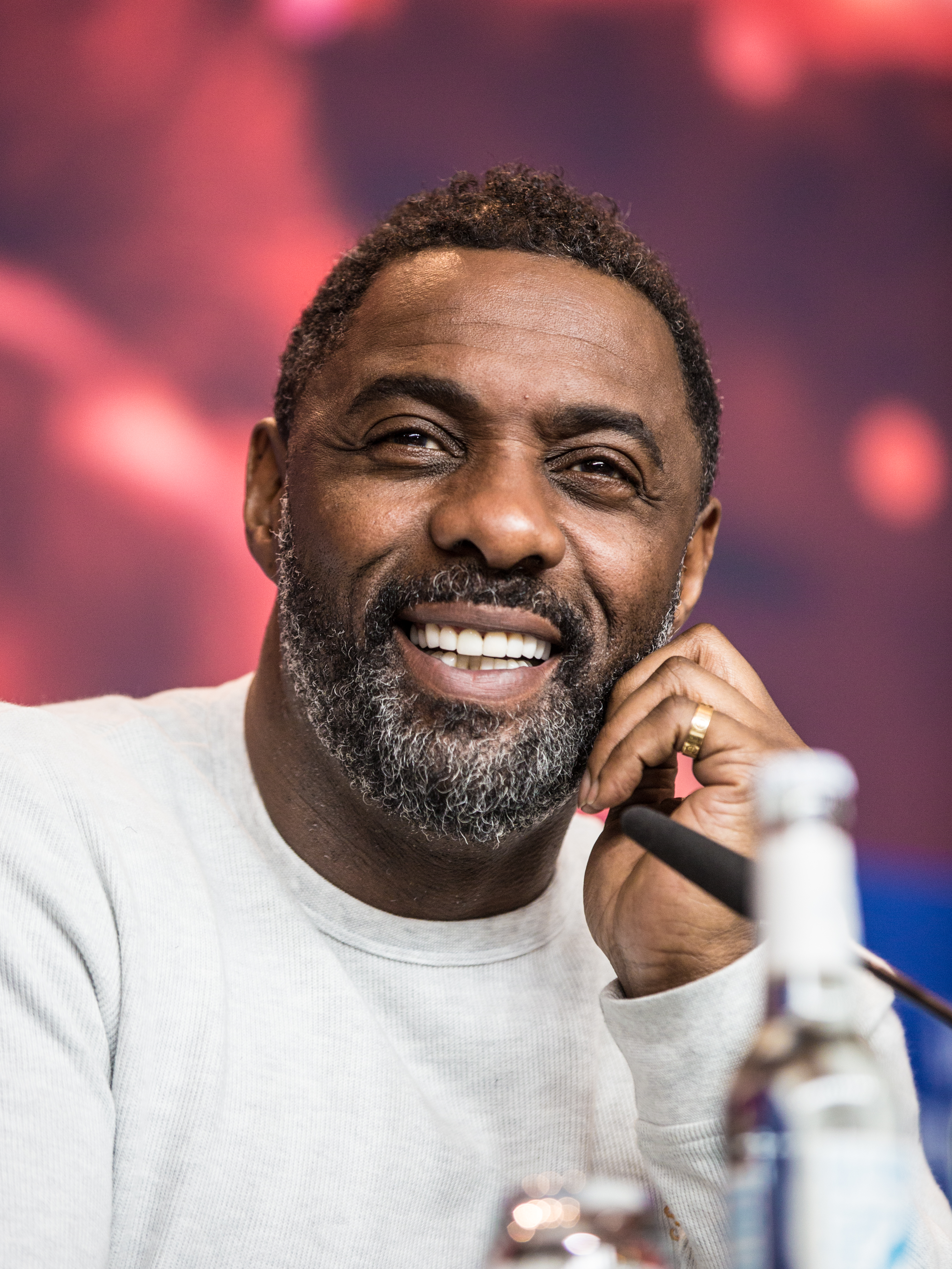
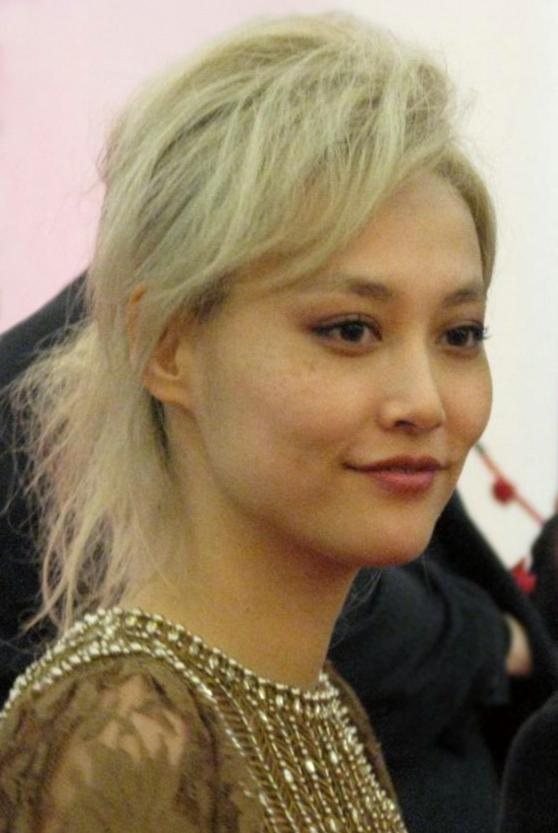
Top to bottom: Charlie Hunnam, Idris Elba, and Rinko Kikuchi star in the film as Raleigh Becket, Stacker Pentecost and Mako Mori respectively.
- Charlie Hunnam as Raleigh Becket:
  A former Jaeger pilot who is called back into action after his brother is killed in battle. Becket is haunted by his past experiences fighting the Kaiju, but he ultimately decides to join forces with Marshall Stacker Pentecost, to pilot a new Jaeger and take down the monstrous creatures once and for all. On casting Hunnam, del Toro stated, "I saw him and I thought he had an earnest, really honest nature. And he was the kind of guy that I can relate to, as a male audience member I go, 'I like that guy. I would like to have a few beers with that guy' ... he has an earthy quality." Describing the character, Hunnam stated, "When you meet me, in the beginning of the story, I've suffered a giant loss. Not only has it killed my sense of self-worth, but also my will to fight and keep on going. And then, Rinko and Idris, and a couple other people, bring me out of retirement to try to help with this grand push. I think that journey is a very relatable one. Everybody, at some point in their life, has fallen down and not felt like getting back up, but you have to, no matter how difficult it is." Hunnam was also considered for the role of Prince Nuada in del Toro's previous film, Hellboy II: The Golden Army. Paul Michael Wyers plays Raleigh as a child.
- Idris Elba as Marshal Stacker Pentecost:
  A highly respected military leader who has dedicated his life to defending humanity from the Kaiju. He is a firm believer in the power of the Jaeger program and will stop at nothing to see it succeed. Despite his tough exterior, Pentecost is deeply compassionate and fiercely loyal to his team. On selecting Elba, del Toro stated, "This is a movie where I have had to deal with more dialogue than ever, and the way I cast the movie was—who do I want to hear say these things? Who do I want Charlie Hunnam to go against? Who can really tell Charlie Hunnam 'sit down and listen'?" In another interview, the director said: "I wanted to have Idris not be the blonde, square-jawed, Anglo, super hip marine that knows [everything]. I wanted somebody that could bring a lot of authority, but that you could feel the weight of the world on his shoulders. When I watched Luther, that's the essence of the character ... Luther is carrying literally the evils of the world on his shoulders. He's doing penance for all humanity ... Idris is one of those actors that is capable of embodying humanity, in almost like a Rodin sculpture-type, larger than life, almost like a Russian realism statue, you know, big hands, all the turmoil of humanity in his eyes. I wanted somebody that you could have doubts internally, and very few guys can do that." To prepare for the role, Elba watched footage of politicians David Cameron and Barack Obama, as well as Russell Crowe in Gladiator and Mel Gibson in Braveheart. Del Toro initially envisioned the character as a Pete "Maverick" Mitchell-type character and offered the role to Tom Cruise, who briefly accepted the part and engaged in negotiations but ultimately backed out during the process over pay and scheduling.
- Rinko Kikuchi as Mako Mori:
  A young woman who has dreamed of piloting a Jaeger her entire life. She is initially rejected from the program due to her lack of experience, but she ultimately proves herself to be a skilled and capable pilot. Mori has a deep personal connection to the Kaiju, and her motivation for joining the fight is deeply personal. Del Toro explained, "I was very careful how I built the movie. One of the other things I decided was that I wanted a female lead who has the equal force as the male leads. She's not going to be a sex kitten, she's not going to come out in cutoff shorts and a tank top, and it's going to be a real earnestly drawn character." Noting that the other actors were exhausted and "destroyed physically" by filming in the intensive Jaeger cockpit harnesses, del Toro said: "The only one that didn't break was Rinko Kikuchi, the girl. She never complained ... I asked Rinko her secret and she said 'I think of gummi bears and flowers.' I try to do that in my life now." Mana Ashida plays Mako as a child.
- Charlie Day as Dr. Newton "Newt" Geiszler:
  An eccentric and brilliant scientist who is obsessed with studying the Kaiju. He is initially brought on to the team to help understand the creatures and find a way to defeat them, but he quickly becomes embroiled in the larger conflict. Despite his quirks, Geiszler is a valuable member of the team and plays a crucial role in the final battle against the Kaiju. Day stated, "Certainly myself and Burn Gorman provide a little bit of much needed levity, it's a break from the monsters and the guys fighting. But then the character gets thrust into the story in a way that his life is seriously at risk and it becomes a little more action oriented and a little more horror movie-esque. So, he kinda bounces back between being humorous and also being real ... the rest of these guys, they look really good in their suits and they've got abs, they can kick and fight and punch. Newt is sort of the 'everyman' and he's flawed and he's arrogant." Del Toro gave Geiszler the mentality of a celebrity chef, with tattoos and a "big personality". According to the director, Day was cast based on his performance in an episode of It's Always Sunny in Philadelphia: "He comes out with a stick, and he has a monologue about what it is to hunt the rats in the basement. It was very funny, but he was coming from character. He was not doing big stuff, he was, like, really mourning and lamenting his job, you know, how inhuman it is. And I thought, 'This guy is great at shading and comedy.' There are moments in the movie where he delivers them both." Trek Buccino portrays Newt as a child.
- Ron Perlman as Hannibal Chau:
  A black marketeer who makes a living dealing Kaiju organs. Perlman stated, "I actually think this character was designed to be played by another ethnicity other than myself. And somewhere along the way, del Toro had the notion, 'Wouldn't it be interesting to turn this guy into more of an invention.' So, in other words, somebody takes on a persona that completely sounds like he's someone else and acts like he's someone else but he's really, you know, as you see me. That added a dimension to the larger-than-life aspect of the character ... I'm playing somebody very close to my own origins. But a completely made-up persona ... which makes him even more full of shit. And I think that's the charm of the guy—that he's kind of elusive, hard to pin down." Pacific Rim marks Perlman's fifth appearance in a del Toro film. The director stated, "I think the moment you have a guy that is called Hannibal Chau and Ron shows up, and he's from Brooklyn and he's been selling black market organs, you know the whole story ... That's all I need to know. If it's any other actor, there's a lot more explaining to do. But when Ron comes in with that look, you can make your own story and it'll be as compelling as anything I can invent. You do a little weightlifting with the audience." The bird tattoos on Chau's fingers indicate his past as a gangster. In the film, Chau states he took the name from his favorite historical figure and his second-favorite Sichuan restaurant in Brooklyn. Del Toro drew inspiration from Burt Lancaster's performance in Elmer Gantry when writing the character.
- Robert Kazinsky as Chuck Hansen:
  An Australian Jaeger pilot considered the finest soldier left in the Resistance. He and his father Herc pilot Striker Eureka, "the strongest and the fastest" Jaeger with eleven Kaiju kills, and make up the Resistance's "go-to team". Kazinsky, a fan of science-fiction, was initially drawn by the film's concept, "My immediate reaction was 'Holy crap, that's cool.' In the hands of somebody else, you might sit there and go, 'Well, this might be terrible,' but with del Toro doing it, you kind of go, 'This is going to be amazing.'". Reflecting on his experience in the film, Kazinsky said in an interview, "The most fun I have ever had in my entire life was Pacific Rim, playing Chuck was incredibly fun."
- Max Martini as Hercules "Herc" Hansen:
  Chuck's father and co-pilot. Kazinsky stated Martini hated the fact that he was cast as Chuck's father, being only 13 years Kazinsky's senior. However, Kazinsky said they developed a bond while filming, "Because we were working so tight together, we would finish and then we would go out for dinner every night and we would go to the gym together on days off we had ... The emotional scene toward the end with the father-son parting, it was very easy for me to play because I had grown to actually genuinely love Max as a man and as a friend." Kazinsky revealed that Herc and Chuck's pet bulldog was del Toro's idea and said, "The dog's name was Max, ironically, and we ended up using Max for so many things. The story was that Herc and Chuck have difficulty communicating, that they communicated via the dog, and all the love that they couldn't show each other they would show the dog." The role was originally written for Ron Perlman, but del Toro decided the scenes between Perlman's Herc and Hunnam's Raleigh "might start to feel like Sons of Anarchy 2.0".
- Clifton Collins Jr. as Tendo Choi:
  A Jaeger technician of Chinese and South American descent. Collins described his character as the "brains" behind the Jaegers.
- Burn Gorman as Dr. Hermann Gottlieb:
  A scientist studying the Kaiju alongside Geiszler. According to del Toro, Gottlieb is a "tweed-wearing, English, phlegmatic introvert that never leaves the lab". The modest Gottlieb resents Geiszler's arrogance and radical behavior; the duo echo the film's theme of incompatible people functioning together when the time comes. Drew Adkins portrays Gottlieb as a child.
- Diego Klattenhoff as Yancy Becket:
  Raleigh's older brother and co-pilot. Klattenhoff joined the project to work with del Toro. Describing his character, Klattenhoff said, "This is a guy who is looking out for his very eager, younger brother and they were enabled with this gift that gave them the opportunity to kind of save the world. Or help, at least." Tyler Stevenson plays Yancy as a child.

Additional Jaeger pilots include Charles Luu, Lance Luu and Mark Luu as the Wei Tang triplets (China), and Robert Maillet and Heather Doerksen as Sasha and Alexis Kaidanovsky (Russia). Joe Pingue portrays Captain Merrit, the captain of a fishing boat caught in a battle between Jaeger and Kaiju. Santiago Segura plays an aide to Hannibal Chau. Brad William Henke and Larry Joe Campbell portray members of an Alaskan construction team that Raleigh joins after retiring from the Pan Pacific Defense Corps. Robin Thomas, Julian Barnes, and David Richmond-Peck portray U.N. representatives from the United States, Great Britain, and Canada, respectively. Sebastian Pigott appears as a Jaeger engineer and Joshua Peace appears as an officer, Jonathan Foxon appears as a frantic civilian. David Fox plays an old man on a beach, while Jane Watson portrays Raleigh and Yancy's mother in a flashback sequence. Producer Thomas Tull makes a cameo appearance. Ellen McLain makes a vocal appearance as the A.I of the Gipsy Danger, a nod to her role as GLaDOS in the Portal game series.

== Themes ==
In the film, a Jaeger's neural load is too much for a single pilot to handle alone, meaning they must first be psychically linked to another pilot—a concept called "drifting". When pilots drift, they quickly gain intimate knowledge of each other's memories and feelings, and have no choice but to accept them; del Toro found this concept's dramatic potential compelling. The director expressed his intention that the empathy metaphors extend to real life:

The pilots' smaller stories actually make a bigger point, which is that we're all together in the same robot [in life] ... Either we get along or we die. I didn't want this to be a recruitment ad or anything jingoistic. The idea of the movie is just for us to trust each other, to cross over barriers of color, sex, beliefs, whatever, and just stick together.

Del Toro acknowledged this message's simplicity, but said he would have liked to have seen adventure films with similar morals when he was a child. The film's ten primary characters all have "little arcs" conducive to this idea. Del Toro stated, "I think that's a great message to give kids ... 'That guy you were beating the shit out of ten minutes ago? That's the guy you have to work with five minutes later.' That's life ... We can only be complete when we work together." The director noted that Hellboy and The Devil's Backbone told the same message, though the latter conveyed it in a very different way.

The film centers on the relationship between Becket and Mori, but is not a love story in a conventional sense. Both are deeply damaged human beings who have decided to suppress their respective traumas. While learning to pilot their Jaeger, they undergo a process of "opening up", gaining access to each other's thoughts, memories and secrets. Their relationship is necessarily one of respect and "perfect trust". Hunnam commented that the film is "a love story without a love story. It's about all of the necessary elements of love without arriving at love itself". Both Becket and Mori have suffered profound personal tragedies; one of the script's central ideas is that two damaged people can metaphorically "become one", with their figurative missing pieces connecting almost like a puzzle. Del Toro emphasized the characters' transition from mutual indifference to emotional intimacy by filming their training fight scene the way he would a courtship scene at a dance.

Del Toro, a self-described pacifist, avoided what he termed "car commercial aesthetics" or "army recruitment video aesthetics", and gave the characters Western ranks including "marshal" and "ranger" rather than military ranks such as "captain", "major" or "general". The director stated that he "avoided making any kind of message that says war is good. We have enough firepower in the world." Del Toro wanted to break from the mass death and destruction featured in contemporary blockbuster films, and made a point of showing the streets and buildings being evacuated before Kaiju attacks, ensuring that the destruction depicted is "completely remorseless". The director stated:

I don't want people being crushed. I want the joy that I used to get seeing Godzilla toss a tank without having to think there are guys in the tank ... What I think is you could do nothing but echo the moment you're in. There is a global anxiety about how fragile the status quo is and the safety of citizens, but in my mind—honestly—this film is in another realm. There is no correlation to the real world. There is no fear of a copycat Kaiju attack because a Kaiju saw it on the news and said, "I'm going to destroy Seattle." In my case, I'm picking up a tradition. One that started right after World War II and was a coping mechanism, in a way, for Japan to heal the wounds of that war. And it's integral for a Kaiju to rampage in the city.

Writing for the Los Angeles Review of Books, Wai Chee Dimock connected the film's central theme of togetherness to its recurring image of missing shoes, stating the "utopian dream" driving the characters is

that puny humans like us could be "together"—not only in the specific neural melding that must take place between the two Jaeger co-pilots but also, more generally speaking, in a fractal web of resemblance, filling the world with copies of ourselves at varying orders of magnitude and with varying degrees of re-expression, beginning with the shoes on our feet.

== Production ==
=== Development ===
In February 2006, it was reported that Travis Beacham would direct Guillermo del Toro's fantasy screenplay Killing on Carnival Row, but the project never materialized. Beacham conceived Pacific Rim the following year. While walking on the beach near Santa Monica Pier, the screenwriter imagined a giant robot and a giant monster fighting to the death. "They just sort of materialized out of the fog, these vast, godlike things." He later conceived the idea that each robot had two pilots, asking "what happens when one of those people dies?" Deciding this would be "a story about loss, moving on after loss, and dealing with survivor's guilt", Beacham commenced writing the film. On May 28, 2010, it was reported that Legendary Pictures had purchased Beacham's detailed 25-page film treatment, now titled Pacific Rim.

On July 28, 2010, it was reported that del Toro would next direct an adaptation of H. P. Lovecraft's At the Mountains of Madness for Universal Studios, with James Cameron producing. When del Toro met with Legendary Pictures to discuss the possibility of collaborating with them on a film, he was intrigued by Beacham's treatment—still a "very small pitch" at this point. Del Toro struck a deal with Legendary: while directing At the Mountains of Madness, he would produce and co-write Pacific Rim; because of the films' conflicting production schedules, he would direct Pacific Rim only if At the Mountains of Madness were cancelled. Tom Cruise was attached to star in the Lovecraft adaptation.

On March 7, 2011, it was reported that Universal would not proceed with At the Mountains of Madness because del Toro was unwilling to compromise on the $150 million budget and R rating. The director later reflected, "When it happened, this has never happened to me, but I actually cried that weekend a lot. I don't want to sound like a puny soul, but I really was devastated. I was weeping for the movie." The project collapsed on a Friday, and del Toro signed to direct Pacific Rim the following Monday.

Del Toro spent a year working with Beacham on the screenplay, and is credited as co-writer. He introduced ideas he had always wished to see in the genre, such as a Kaiju birth and a Kaiju attack seen from a child's perspective. The script also received an uncredited rewrite from Neil Cross, who previously created the Idris Elba-starring drama series Luther and wrote the del Toro-produced horror film Mama. Patrick Melton and Marcus Dunstan were enlisted to perform uncredited rewrites when their spec script Monstropolis caught the filmmaker's attention. Drew Pearce also carried out uncredited work on the script.

=== Filming ===
Filming began on November 14, 2011, and continued in Toronto into April 2012. Del Toro gave an update after the second week on filming finished. The film was referred to as Silent Seas and Still Seas during production.

Del Toro had never shot a film in fewer than 115 days, but had only 103 to shoot Pacific Rim. In order to achieve this, del Toro scheduled a splinter unit that he could direct early in the day, before main unit, and on his off-days. The director worked 17 to 18 hours a day, seven days a week, for much of the schedule. Del Toro took a new approach to directing actors, allowing "looser" movements and improvisation; the director maintained tight control over the production: "Everything, 100% goes through me sooner or later. I do not delegate anything. Some people like it, some people don't, but it has to be done that way."

The film was shot using Red Epic cameras. At first Guillermo del Toro decided not to shoot or convert the film to 3D, as the effect would not work due to the sheer size of the film's robots and monsters, explaining

I didn't want to make the movie 3D because when you have things that big ... the thing that happens naturally, you're looking at two buildings lets say at 300 feet [away], if you move there is no parallax. They're so big that, in 3D, you barely notice anything no matter how fast you move ... To force the 3D effects for robots and monsters that are supposed to be big you are making their [perspective] miniaturized, making them human scale.

It was later announced that the film would be converted to 3D, with the conversion taking 40 weeks longer than most. Del Toro said: "What can I tell you? I changed my mind. I'm not running for office. I can do a Romney."

Del Toro cut approximately an hour of material from the film. The unused footage explored the characters and their arcs in greater detail, but the director felt it was necessary to strike a balance, stating: "We cannot pretend this is Ibsen with monsters and giant robots. I cannot pretend I'm doing a profound reflection on mankind." Each character's arc was edited down to its minimal requirements. The director wanted to keep the film around two hours, particularly for younger viewers. Alejandro González Iñárritu and Alfonso Cuarón helped with the editing; Iñárritu removed ten minutes of footage, while Cuarón removed "a few minutes" and rearranged several scenes. Iñárritu and Cuarón receive a "special thanks" in the film's end credits, as do James Cameron and David Cronenberg. Cameron's role is unknown, but del Toro has explained that Cronenberg extensively helped with crewing the film in Toronto.

=== Design ===
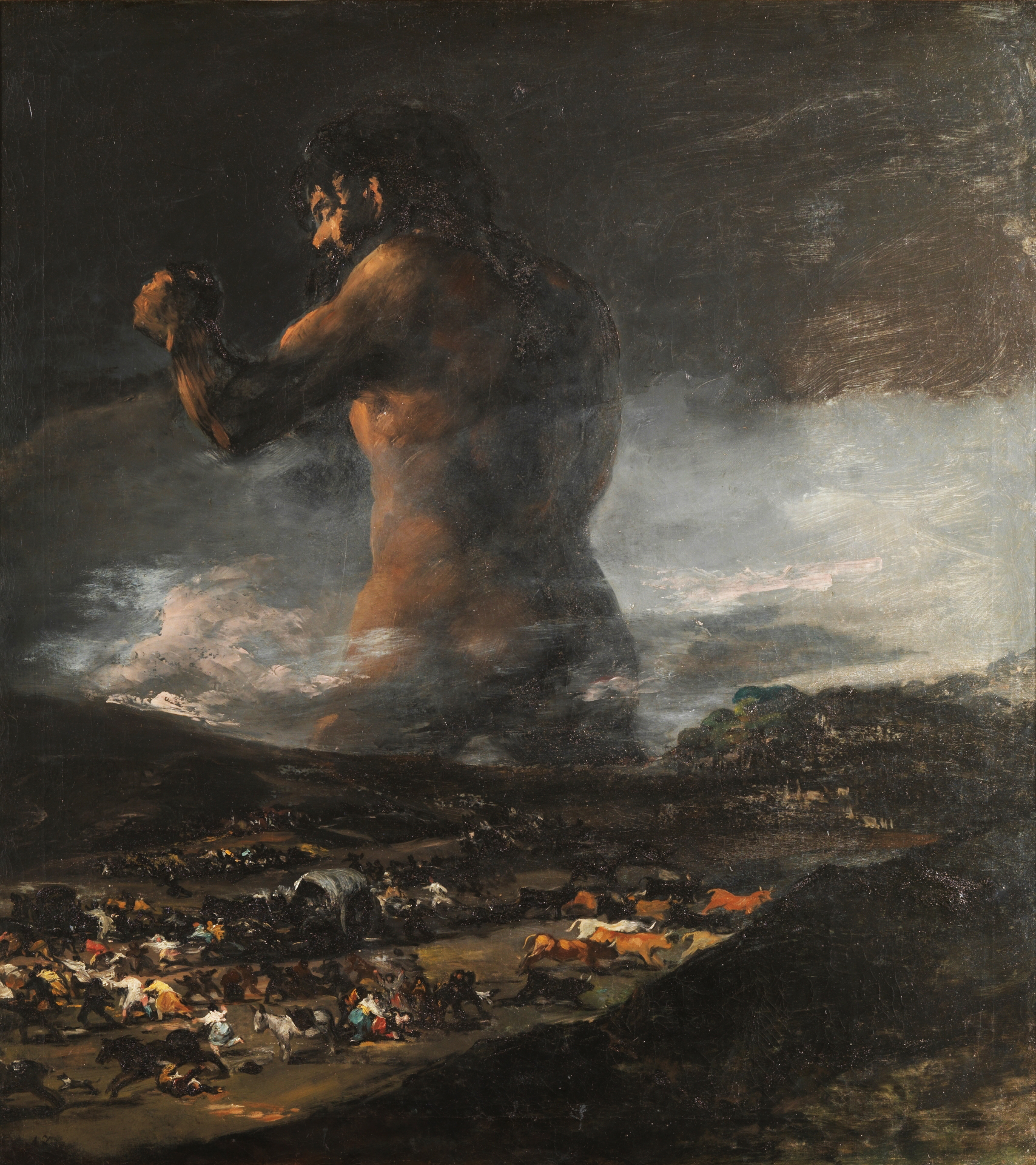
Del Toro drew inspiration from Francisco Goya's The Colossus, and hoped to evoke the same "sense of awe" with the film's battles.

Del Toro envisioned Pacific Rim as an earnest, colorful adventure story, with an "incredibly airy and light feel", in contrast to the "super-brooding, super-dark, cynical summer movie". The director focused on "big, beautiful, sophisticated visuals" and action that would satisfy an adult audience, but has stated his "real hope" is to introduce the Kaiju and mecha genres to a generation of children. While the film draws heavily on these genres, it avoids direct references to previous works. Del Toro intended to create something original but "madly in love" with its influences, instilled with "epic beauty" and "operatic grandeur". The ending credits dedicate the film to Ray Harryhausen and Ishirō Honda, who helped to establish the giant monster genre with films such as The Beast from 20,000 Fathoms and Godzilla, respectively.

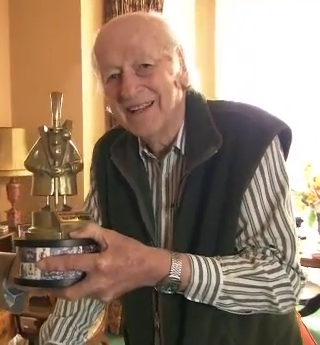
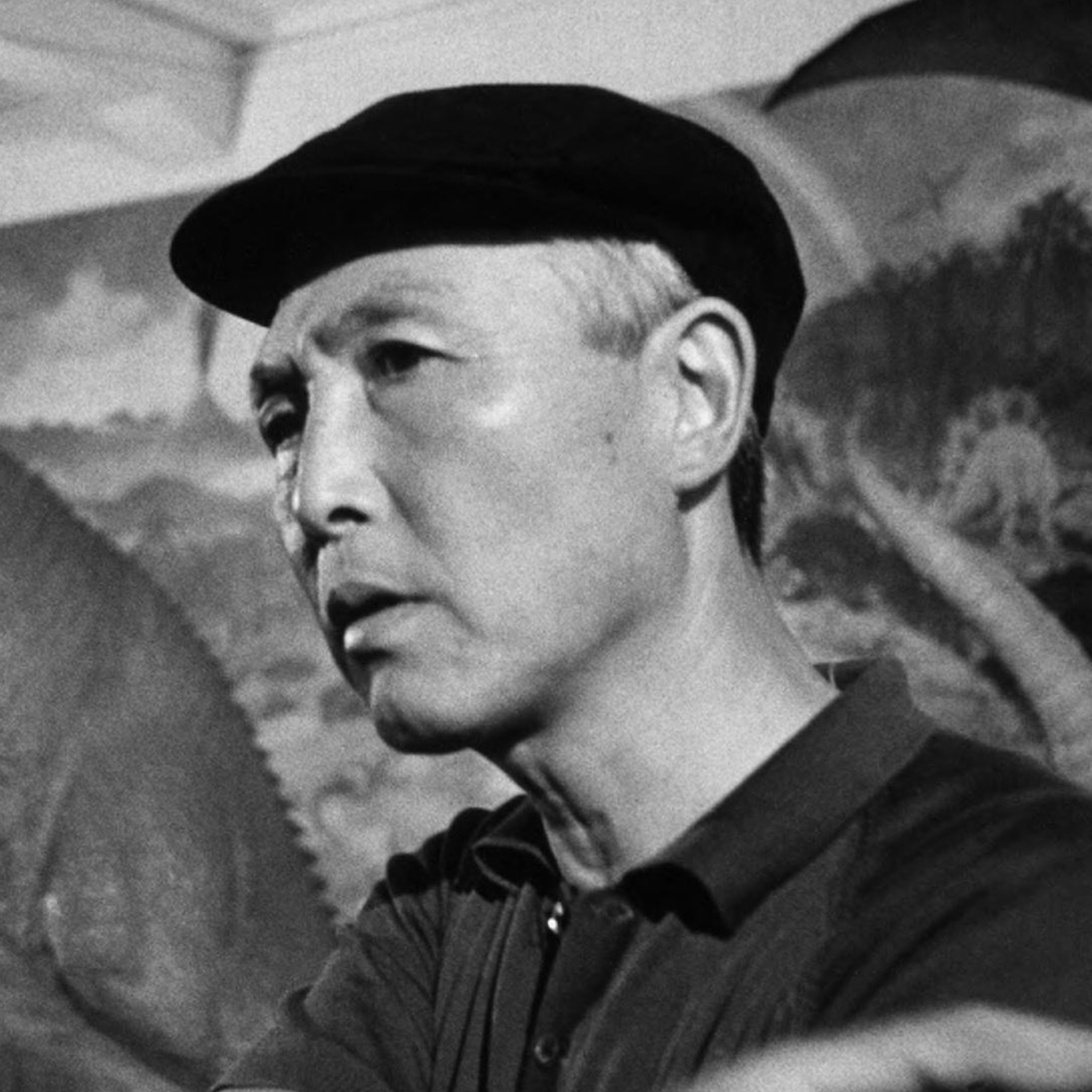
The film was dedicated to Ray Harryhausen and Ishirō Honda, influential artists of giant monster films.

The film was to honor the Kaiju and mecha genres while creating an original stand-alone film, something "conscious of the heritage, but not a pastiche or an homage or a greatest hits of everything". The director made a point of starting from scratch, without emulating or referencing any previous examples of those genres. He cautioned his designers not to turn to films like Godzilla, Gamera, or The War of the Gargantuas for inspiration, stating: "I didn't want to be postmodern, or referential, or just belong to a genre. I really wanted to create something new, something madly in love with those things. I tried to bring epic beauty to it, and drama and operatic grandeur." Rather than popular culture, he drew inspiration from works of art such as The Colossus and George Bellows's boxing paintings. The film's designers include Wayne Barlowe (who is the primary designer of the Kaiju), Oscar Chichoni, monster sculptors David Meng and Simon Lee, and Hellboy II and The Hobbit designer Francisco Ruiz Velasco. Del Toro has acknowledged that some designs created for his cancelled At the Mountains of Madness adaptation may have been used in Pacific Rim.

Approximately one hundred Kaiju and one hundred Jaegers were designed, but only a fraction of these appear in the film; every week the filmmakers would "do an American Idol" and vote for the best. In designing Kaiju, the film's artists frequently drew inspiration from nature rather than other works. The director commented: "Kaijus are essentially outlandish in a way, but on the other hand they come sort of in families: you've got the reptilian Kaiju, the insect Kaiju, the sort of crustacean Kaiju ... So to take an outlandish design and then render it with an attention to real animal anatomy and detail is interesting." Del Toro avoided making the Kaiju too similar to any Earth creatures, instead opting to make them otherworldly and alien. Del Toro called the film's Kaiju "weapons", stating that they are "the cleaning crew, the cats sent into the warehouse to clean out the mice." Certain design elements are shared by all the Kaiju; this is intended to suggest that they are connected and were designed for a similar purpose. Each Kaiju was given a vaguely humanoid silhouette to echo the man-in-suit aesthetic of early Japanese Kaiju films. While del Toro's other films feature ancient or damaged monsters, the Kaiju lack scars or any evidence of prior culture, indicating that they are engineered creations rather than the result of an evolutionary system.

Knifehead, the first Kaiju to appear in the film, is a tribute to the plodding kaiju of 1960s Japanese films, and is intended to look almost like a man in a rubber suit; its head was inspired by that of a goblin shark. Leatherback, the bouncer-like Kaiju which spews electro-magnetic charges, is a favorite of del Toro, who conceived it as a "brawler with this sort of beer belly"; the lumbering movements of gorillas were used as a reference. The Kaiju Otachi homages the dragons of Chinese mythology. The director called it a "Swiss army knife of a Kaiju"; with almost 20 minutes of screen time, it was given numerous features so the audience would not tire of it. The creature moves like a Komodo dragon in water, sports multiple jaws and an acid-filled neck sack, and unfurls wings when necessary. It is also more intelligent than the other Kaiju, employing eagle-inspired strategies against the Jaegers. Onibaba, the Kaiju that orphans Mako Mori, resembles a fusion of a Japanese temple and a crustacean. Slattern, the largest Kaiju, is distinguished by its extremely long neck and "half-horn, half-crown" head, which del Toro considered both demonic and majestic.

Gipsy Danger, the American Jaeger, was based on the shape of New York City's Art Deco buildings, such as the Chrysler Building and the Empire State Building, but infused with John Wayne's gunslinger gait and hip movements. Cherno Alpha, the Russian Jaeger, was based on the shape and paint patterns of a T-series Russian tank, combined with a giant containment silo to give the appearance of a walking nuclear power plant with a cooling tower on its head. Crimson Typhoon, the three-armed Chinese Jaeger, is piloted by triplets and resembles a "medieval little warrior"; its texture evokes Chinese lacquered wood with golden edges. Striker Eureka, the Australian Jaeger, is likened by del Toro to a Land Rover; the most elegant and masculine Jaeger, it has a jutting chest, a camouflage paint scheme recalling the Australian outback, and the bravado of its pilots.

The elaborate launch sequences for the Jaeger were inspired by the complexity of the launch sequences in the British TV series Thunderbirds.

The film's costumes were designed by Shane Mahan and Kate Hawley, who spent several months on the costumes of the Jaeger pilots. The Russian pilot suits are old-fashioned and echo cosmonaut space suits.

=== Visual effects ===
Industrial Light & Magic (ILM) was chosen to create the visual effects for Pacific Rim. Del Toro hired Academy Award winners John Knoll and Hal T. Hickel, both known for their work on the Star Wars prequel trilogy and the Pirates of the Caribbean films. Legacy Effects co-owner Shane Mahan, known for creating the armored suits for Iron Man, was tasked with building the suits, helmets and conn-pods. Academy Award winner Clay Pinney, known for his work on Independence Day and Star Trek, was also brought on board. Hybride Technologies, a division of Ubisoft, and Rodeo FX also contributed to the visual effects.

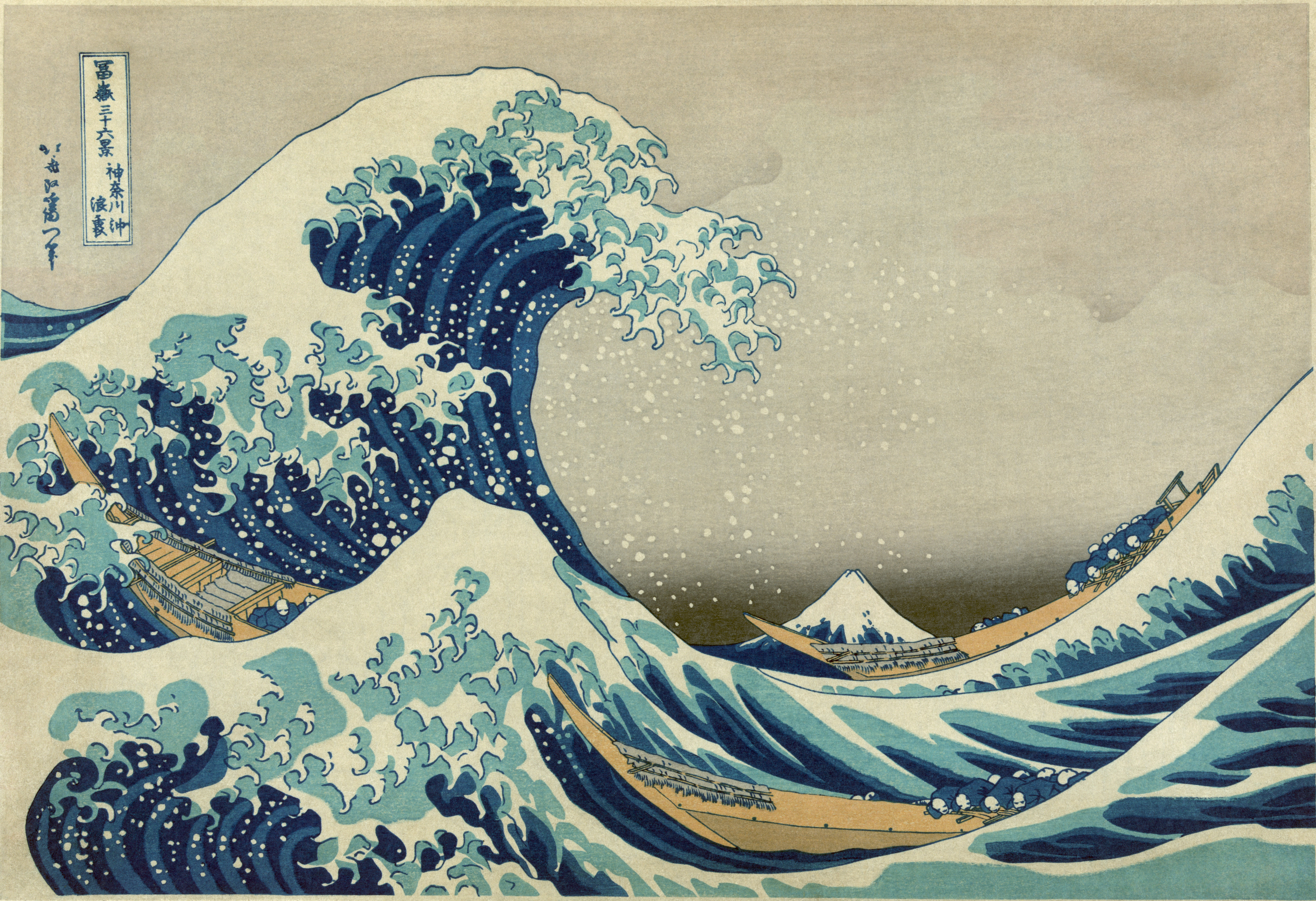
Del Toro used classic art such as Hokusai's The Great Wave off Kanagawa as a reference for the film's ocean battles.

Del Toro conceived the film as an operatic work:

That was one of the first words I said to the entire team at ILM. I said, "This movie needs to be theatrical, operatic, romantic." We used a lot of words not usually associated with high-tech blockbusters ... We went for a very, very, very, very saturated color palette for the battle for Hong Kong. I kept asking John to tap into his inner Mexican and be able to saturate the greens and the purples and the pinks and the oranges.

The classic Japanese woodblock print The Great Wave off Kanagawa by Hokusai was a common motif in the ocean battles; Del Toro recalled, "I would say 'Give me a Hokusai wave' ... we use the waves and weather in the movie very operatically." The director asked that Knoll not necessarily match the lighting from shot to shot: "It's pretty unorthodox to do that, but I think the results are really beautiful and very artistically free and powerful, not something you would associate with a big sci-fi action movie." Del Toro considers the film's digital water its most exciting visual effect: "The water dynamics in this movie are technically beautiful, but also artistically incredibly expressive. We agreed on making the water become almost another character. We would time the water very precisely. I'd say 'Get out of the wave [on this frame].'"

The film also features extensive miniature effect shots provided by 32TEN Studios, under the supervision of ILM VFX Producer Susan Greenhow and ILM VFX Supervisors John Knoll and Lindy DeQuattro. Shot using RED Epic cameras on 3D rigs, the scenes produced by 32TEN involved the creation of a quarter-scale office building interior which was destroyed by the fist of a Jaeger robot which was on a separate pneumatically controlled rig, as well as a sequence which depicted several rows of seats in a soccer stadium being blown apart as a Jaeger lands in the stadium, which was created by using quarter-scale seats blown apart by air cannons. Additionally 32TEN provided several practical elements for ILM's compositing team including dust clouds, breaking glass and water effects.

== Music ==
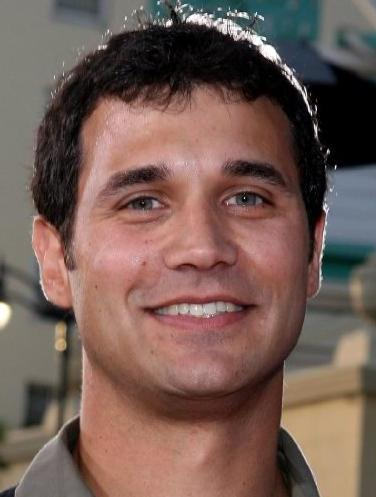
Ramin Djawadi is the composer of the Pacific Rim score.

The film's score was composed by Ramin Djawadi. Del Toro selected Djawadi based on his works on Prison Break, Iron Man and Game of Thrones, stating: "His scores have a grandeur, but they have also an incredible sort of human soul." The director also stated that some Russian rap would be featured in the film. The soundtrack was released on digital download from Amazon on June 18, 2013, and CD on June 25, 2013. The physical version of the soundtrack was released on July 9, 2013, by WaterTower Music, three days before the theatrical release of the film itself. Guest musicians Tom Morello and Priscilla Ahn also feature as soloists on the score. Two songs appear in the film which are not included on the soundtrack are "Just Like Your Tenderness" by Luo Xiaoxuan, and the ending theme "Drift", performed by Blake Perlman featuring Rza. The OST received mostly positive reviews. The Action Elite rated the album with a perfect five stars, the Empire gave four, while MSN and Filmtracks also gave the soundtrack four out of five stars. On July 27, 2013, the soundtrack appeared at peak position number 7 on "US Billboard Top Soundtracks."

== Marketing ==
On November 28, 2012, the official film website premiered alongside two viral videos—one depicting the initial Kaiju attack as captured by a handheld camera. Blueprints depicting the designs for the Jaeger machines were also released online. On June 5, 2013, the graphic novel Pacific Rim: Tales from Year Zero was released. Written by Travis Beacham and featuring cover art by Alex Ross, Tales from Year Zero serves as an introductory prologue to the film, and is set twelve years before its events. On June 18, Insight Editions published Pacific Rim: Man, Machines, and Monsters, an art book written by David S. Cohen. The book chronicles the film's production with concept art, photography, the cast and crew's accounts of the shoot, and a foreword by del Toro. On July 2, a viral video was released in which Ron Perlman's character, Hannibal Chau, advertises his fictional Kaiju organ dealership, Kaiju Remedies.

On the day of the film's release, July 12, 2013, another viral video was released to promote the film. It involved the collaboration of the film studio (including del Toro himself) and the YouTube network Polaris (also known as The Game Station). It featured members of the YouTube network (such as the Game Grumps) as Jaeger pilots fighting Kaiju. On July 16, a novelization by Alex Irvine was released. NECA began selling action figures of the film's Kaiju and Jaegers.

== Release ==
Pacific Rim was initially expected to reach theaters on July 12, 2013. However, Warner Bros. decided to move up the film's release date to May 10, 2013. In March 2012, it was announced that the film would be released on the original release date of July 12, 2013. The film premiered in Mexico City on July 1, 2013.

=== Home media ===
Pacific Rim became available for download on the iTunes Store and Vudu on October 1, 2013. The film was released on DVD, Blu-ray and Blu-ray 3D in the United States on October 15, 2013, and in the United Kingdom and other countries on November 25, 2013. A collector's edition was also available on the same date. To help promote the home media release, Bryan Harley and Roque Rodriguez of Fresno, California, produced a "sweded" version of the film's Gipsy Danger vs. Otachi battle scene, after del Toro was impressed by the duo's "sweded" trailer released on YouTube in March 2013. As of March 2014, Pacific Rim has sold 961,845 DVDs along with 1,427,692 Blu-ray Discs in the United States for $10,045,530 and $24,634,992 in revenue, respectively, for a total of $37,079,122. Pacific Rim was released on Ultra HD Blu-ray on October 4, 2016.

== Reception ==
=== Box office ===
Pacific Rim grossed $101 million in North America, and has had a favorable international release, grossing $310 million in other countries, for a worldwide total of $411 million.

The film grossed $3.6 million from Thursday night showings, 23 percent of which came from IMAX showings. It then faced competition from Grown Ups 2 and ultimately fell behind it on opening day, earning $18.6 million. The film reached the #3 spot during the opening weekend with $37.2 million, behind Despicable Me 2 and Grown Ups 2. This is the highest-ever opening for a film by del Toro, surpassing Hellboy II: The Golden Army. Around 50 percent of tickets were in 3D, which makes it the second-highest 3D share of 2013, behind Gravity. During its second weekend, the film dropped a steep 57% with a gross of $16 million, and during its third weekend, had dropped a further 52% with a gross of $7.7 million. On July 22, 2013, it was reported that the film had reached #1 at the international box office over the weekend. The film had a successful opening in China, grossing $45.2 million, until it was overtaken by The Hobbit: The Battle of the Five Armies. It was the largest opening in China for a Warner Bros. title, and the sixth-largest Chinese debut of all time for any Hollywood film. On August 19, 2013, its gross crossed $100 million in China alone, becoming the sixth-highest-grossing American film ever in China. It grossed a total of $136.4 million in the country, making China the largest market for the film. In Japan, the film landed in the fifth position on opening weekend, with an initial earning of $3 million (behind World War Z's gross of $3.4 million).

In September 2013, Forbes highlighted Pacific Rim as "the rare English-language film in history to cross $400 million while barely crossing $100 million domestic".

=== Critical response ===
Pacific Rim received generally positive reviews from critics. The review aggregator website Rotten Tomatoes gives the film a 72% approval rating based on 294 reviews, with an average rating of 6.60/10. The website's critical consensus reads, "It may sport more style than substance, but Pacific Rim is a solid modern creature feature bolstered by fantastical imagery and an irresistible sense of fun." Review aggregation website Metacritic gives the film a rating of 65 out of 100 based on reviews from 48 critics, which indicates "generally favorable reviews". Audiences polled by CinemaScore gave the film an average grade of "A−" on an A+ to F scale.

The Daily Telegraph's Robbie Collin awarded the film five stars out of five, likening the experience of watching it to rediscovering a favorite childhood cartoon. He praised del Toro for investing his own affection for the genre and sense of artistry into the project in such a way that the viewer found themselves immersed in the film rather than watching from afar, noting the director had catered to younger and older audiences alike and expressed surprise that the film could rise above the sum of its parts. Todd McCarthy of The Hollywood Reporter gave a positive review, describing the film as the sum of the potential every monster film had ever tried to fulfill. Drew McWeeny of HitFix highlighted other aspects of the film, paying particular attention to the production and art design. He also praised the cinematography for "perfectly capturing" the film, and described the score as "ridiculously cool". Rolling Stone's Peter Travers called the film "the work of a humanist ready to banish cynicism for compassion", saying that del Toro "drives the action with a heartbeat". Keith Uhlich of Time Out called the film "pure, pleasurable comic-book absurdity", and noted that del Toro had lent the proceedings a "plausible humanity" lacking in most of summer 2013's destruction-heavy blockbusters. He said the Kaijus' civilian victims make a "palpably personal impression", deeming one scene with Mako Mori "as mythically moving as anything in the mecha anime, like Neon Genesis Evangelion, that the director emulates with expert aplomb." The Village Voice's Stephanie Zacharek called it "summer entertainment with a pulse", praising its "dumbly brilliant" action and freedom from elitism, but noted the story is predictable and suggested del Toro's time would be better spent on more visionary films. Angela Watercutter of Wired called it the "most awesome movie of the summer", a "fist-pumping, awe-inspiring ride", and opined that its focus on spectacle rather than characterization "simply does not matter" in the summer blockbuster context. Richard Roeper gave the film a B, commenting that either the Jaegers or Kaiju "can take down any of the Transformers." Leonard Maltin gave the film two-and-a-half out of four stars, calling it "three-quarters of a really good movie that doesn't know when to quit."

The Guardian's Andrew Pulver was less enthusiastic, calling the film a mix of "wafer-thin psychodrama" and "plot-generator dialogue". Time's Richard Corliss said the action was let down by "inert" drama, describing the film as "45 minutes of awesome encased in 90 minutes of yawnsome." Justin Chang of Variety criticized it as loud and lacking the nuance and subtlety of del Toro's previous films. The New Yorker's Anthony Lane's verdict read as "It is possible to applaud Pacific Rim for the efficacy of its business model while deploring the tale that has been engendered—long, loud, dark, and very wet. You might as well watch the birth of an elephant." The San Francisco Chronicle's Mick LaSalle reacted extremely negatively by stating "If this is the best we can do in terms of movies—if something like this can speak to the soul of audiences—maybe we should just turn over the cameras and the equipment to the alien dinosaurs and see what they come up with ... Director Guillermo del Toro, who gave us Pan's Labyrinth not too many years ago, used to be known as an artistic and discerning filmmaker, despite his affection for blockbuster action and grotesqueness. But too often he gets lost in his computer ... Why go to the movies to look at somebody else's computer after looking at your own all week? ... The actors can't make Pacific Rim any better. They can only relieve some of the pain." Slant Magazine's Ed Gonzalez, who said the film lacked poignancy, compared it to a video game: "a stylish but programmatic ride toward an inevitable final boss battle". TheWrap's Alonso Duralde criticized the choice to set most battles at night or during the rain, feeling it detracted from the action, and said the comic relief actors—Day, Gorman, and Perlman—stole the film from the less interesting leads. Jordan Hoffman of Film.com identified Hunnam as the weak link in the cast, calling him a "charisma black hole". Giles Hardie of The Sydney Morning Herald was particularly critical of the film, awarding the action sequences "five IQ points out of five" as he described the film as an hour and twenty minutes of fight sequences vaguely connected by ten minutes of story.

=== Other response ===
Director Rian Johnson praised the film, as did Japanese game director Hideo Kojima, who called it the "ultimate otaku film" and stated he "never imagined [he] would be fortunate enough to see a film like this in [his] life". Go Nagai, who pioneered the idea of mecha piloted from an interior cockpit, praised the film's fun and intense action, while game developer Fumito Ueda said its battle scenes surpassed memories of the tokusatsu films he saw as an impressionable child. Science fiction author William Gibson called the film "A ravishing display of intelligent, often wonderfully witty visual design, every frame alive with coherent language, in the service of what is at heart a children's story ... A baroque that doesn't curdle, that never fetishizes itself."

=== Accolades ===
Award	Category	Recipients	Result
ABFF Hollywood Awards	Artist of the Year	Idris Elba (also for Mandela: Long Walk to Freedom and Thor: The Dark World)	Nominated
Annie Award	Outstanding Achievement, Animated Effects in a Live Action Production		Won
Annie Award	Outstanding Achievement, Character Animation in a Live Action Production		Nominated
British Academy Film Awards	Best Special Visual Effects		Nominated
Critics' Choice Movie Award	Best Visual Effects		Nominated
Denver Film Critics Society	Best Science Fiction/Horror Film		Nominated
Empire Awards	Best Sci-Fi/Fantasy		Nominated
Hollywood Film Awards	Best Visual Effects	John Knoll	Won
Las Vegas Film Critics Society	Best Horror/Sci-Fi Film		Won
Saturn Award	Best Science Fiction Film		Nominated
Saturn Award	Best Director	Guillermo del Toro	Nominated
Saturn Award	Best Production Design	Andrew Neskoromny and Carol Spier	Nominated
Saturn Award	Best Editing	Peter Amundson and John Gilroy	Nominated
Saturn Award	Best Special Effects	John Knoll, James E. Price, Clay Pinney and Rocco Larizza	Nominated
St. Louis Gateway Film Critics Association	Best Visual Special Effects	John Knoll	Nominated
Teen Choice Awards	Summer Movie Action		Nominated
Visual Effects Society	Outstanding Visual Effects in a Visual Effects-Driven Feature Motion Picture	John Knoll, Susan Greenhow, Chris Raimo, Hal Hickel	Nominated
Visual Effects Society	Outstanding Animated Character in a Live Action Feature Motion Picture	Jakub Pistecky, Frank Gravatt, Cyrus Jam, Chris Havreberg for Kaiju - Leatherback	Nominated
Visual Effects Society	Outstanding Created Environment in a Live Action Feature Motion Picture	Johan Thorngren, Jeremy Bloch, David Meny, Polly Ing for "Virtual Hong Kong"	Nominated
Visual Effects Society	Outstanding Virtual Cinematography in a Live Action Feature Motion Picture	Colin Benoit, Nick Walker, Adam Schnitzer, Victor Schutz for "Hong Kong Ocean Brawl"	Nominated
Visual Effects Society	Outstanding Models in a Feature Motion Picture	David Fogler, Alex Jaeger, Aaron Wilson, David Behrens	Nominated

=== Legacy ===
Named after the female character from the film, Mako Mori (played by Rinko Kikuchi), the Mako Mori test is a set of requirements designed to measure the level of gender equality in a film or TV show. Derived from the Bechdel test, it was born from the following observation: even though the film Pacific Rim gives a rather good representation of women, it fails the Bechdel test. The criterion of the Mako Mori test is as follows: there is at least one female character; with her own narrative arc; independent to that of a male character.

== Sequel ==
A sequel titled Pacific Rim Uprising, directed by Steven S. DeKnight and produced by Del Toro, with Kikuchi, Day, and Gorman reprising their roles, and Universal Pictures taking over the film distribution, was released on March 23, 2018.

== Other media ==
=== Video game ===
A single-player fighting video game based on the film was announced by the Australian Classification Board for Xbox Live Arcade and PlayStation Network. Published and developed by Yuke's, Pacific Rim: The Video Game was released along with the film on July 12, 2013. The game received generally negative reviews. Reliance Games developed a Pacific Rim tie-in game for smartphone platforms, such as iOS and Android devices; this version also received negative reviews.

=== Anime series ===
On November 8, 2018, Netflix announced an original anime series that expands upon the story and universe of the two live-action movies. On October 27, 2020, the anime was officially titled Pacific Rim: The Black, and would follow two siblings that are forced to pilot an abandoned Jaeger "across a hostile landscape in a desperate attempt to find their missing parents". The anime would be animated by Polygon Pictures, with Marvel Comics writer Craig Kyle and Greg Johnson serving as the showrunners. The first season released on March 4, 2021 and the second and final season was released on April 19, 2022.

=== Amusement park ride ===
A 3D amusement park ride, titled Pacific Rim: Shatterdome Strike, opened in 2019 at Trans Studio Cibubur in collaboration with Legendary Entertainment. The ride guides audiences through a battle between the Jaegers and the Kaiju. The ride features walkthrough sections with actors in the middle of the ride. Over the course of its 20-minute run time, audiences are introduced to 3 new Kaiju's and Indonesia's own Jaeger: Storm Garuda.

=== Prequel series ===
On August 19, 2024, it was announced that Legendary is developing a prequel TV series with screenwriter Eric Heisserer.

== See also ==
- List of underwater science fiction works
