= Yu Haoming =

- 俞灏明
- Born: 14 November 1987 (age 38); Guangzhou, Guangdong, China
- Other names: Ham Yu; Prince Ming; DD; Nation's Little Brother; Dancing King
- Occupations: Singer; actor; dancer; host
- Years active: 2007–present
- Organization(s): H4; Other Members: Hans Zhang; Vision Wei; Peer Zhu; Ming Xing Brothers; Other Members: Wang Yuexin; Day Day Brothers; Other Members: Wang Han; Ou Han-sheng; Oscar Qian; Tian Yuan; Kim Eun-sung; Koji Yano
- Agent(s): • EE-Media (2007–2015) • Ham Yu Hao Ming Studio (2016–present)
- Notable work: • Meteor Shower • Love in Spring • Nothing Gold Can Stay
- Musical career
- Genres: Mandopop; Cantopop; Dancepop
- Instruments: Vocals; piano; guitar; saxophone; violin; harmonica
- Labels: DoReMi Media; Super Jet Entertainment

Chinese name
- Chinese: 俞灝明
Transcriptions
Standard Mandarin
- Hanyu Pinyin: Yú Hào Míng
Yue: Cantonese
- Jyutping: jyu4 hou6 ming4
- Website: Yu Haoming on Weibo (in Chinese)

Ham Yu Haoming (born 14 November 1987) is a Chinese singer, actor, dancer, and host. He gained popularity in 2007 through Hunan TV's talent show Super Boy, winning 6th place nationwide. His career was derailed when he was seriously burned in an on-set explosion in 2010 while filming the television series Love in Spring (formerly known as I Have a Date with Spring).

== Career ==
In April 2007, Yu participated in Hunan TV's organized "Super Boy". He won as Guangzhou's Champion and 6th place nationwide. In the same year, he signed the Doremi Media Record and released his first EP "If I Could Love You".

In March 2008, his album "If I Could Love You" was awarded China's Top 10 Golden Melody "Most Popular Online Songs" and Newcomer Awards. Later, he travelled to Seoul, South Korea for professional training. In September 2008, he participated in Hunan TV and Hong Kong TVB's co-organized "Strictly Come Dancing Season 2" and won Champion.

In October 2010, while shooting for Hunan TV's TV Series "Love In Spring" (formerly known as: I Have A Date With Spring) in Shanghai, he got accidentally burnt during a blast scene and was recuperated for a long time.

On the night of 25 October 2019, the first China Online Movie Week ended. Famous film and television performance artists Yue Hong, Zhang Kaili, Yan Danchen, Hu Xianxu and Huang Mengying appeared on the red carpet, bringing the scene to recite "Light and Shadow Memory". On 17 December 2019, "Empress of the Ming" was broadcast on Hunan TV and he played as Zhu Gaoxu in the series.

== Discography ==
=== Studio albums ===
Year	Title
2009	Hug 拥抱

=== EP ===
Year	Title
2007	If I Could Love You 如果，可以爱你

=== Singles ===
Year	Title	Album
2007	I'm Most Shining 我最闪亮	"13" Super Boy 07 Top 13 Compilation Album
2007	Love Is One Person Matter 爱是一个人的事	"13" Super Boy 07 Top 13 Compilation Album
2007	Blue Lover (Duet: Ye Yi Qian) 蓝色爱人	–

Number	Release date	English title	Chinese title	Album	Notes
4	January 2008	Big Star (Duet: Wang Yue Xin)	大明星	Perfect Match	Include in Wang Yue Xin Album
5	October 2008	Love Catcher (Duet: Ren Xi)	幸福捕手	Taiwan Idol Series "Love Catcher" OST	Taiwan Idol Series "Love Catcher" Ending Theme Song
6	June 2009	Touch My Heart	–	–	Samsung Ringtone
7	June 2009	Playing Hand Drum And Sing A Song	打起手鼓唱起歌	Shining of Red Star	Pop Song Cover Compilation
8	July 2009	Waltz of Love (Duet: Zheng Shuang)	爱的华尔兹	TV series "Meteor Shower" OST	TV series "Meteor Shower" Sub Theme Song, Qing Hua Computer Ad Song
9	August 2009	Let Me Sing A Song For You (Quartet: Hans Zhang, Vision Wei, Peer Zhu)	让我为你唱首歌	TV series "Meteor Shower" OST	TV series "Meteor Shower" Theme Song
10	August 2009	Starlit Fairytale (Quartet: Hans Zhang, Vision Wei, Peer Zhu)	星空物语	TV series "Meteor Shower" OST	TV series "Meteor Shower" Opening Theme Song
11	August 2009	One's Romance	一个人的浪漫	TV series "Meteor Shower" OST	TV series "Meteor Shower" Sub Theme Song
12	January 2013	Actually I'm OK	其实我还好	–	Works of Comeback
13	May 2013	I Have A Date With Spring	我和春天有个约会	Love in Spring OST	TV series "Love In Spring" Ending Theme Song
14	October 2014	Loving You Make Me Like A Child	爱你让我像孩子一样	TV series "Because Love Is A Miracle" OST	TV series "Because Love Is A Miracle" Ending Theme Song
15	10 August 2015	Flaming Love	炙爱	Film "Ulterior Motive" OST	Film "Ulterior Motive" Theme Song
16	January 2016	Very Very Good (Ensemble: Celebrities)	棒棒哒	Movie "The New Year's Eve of Old Lee" OST	Movie "The New Year's Eve of Old Lee" Theme Song
17	January 2016	Mr Foolish	愚先生	Mr Foolish	Join Super Jet Entertainment First Single
18	October 2017	Sing for 2030 (Ensemble: Celebrities)	唱响2030	–	United Nations Development Programme (UNDP) China 2030 Global Goals Original Song
19	October 2018	Song Ode	歌颂	–	iQIYI Animation "The Sound of Fox" Theme Song
20	November 2018	Love Confession Time	告白時間	TV series "Our Glamorous Time" OST	TV series "Our Glamorous Time" Sub Theme Song
21	May 2020	Hand in Hand (Ensemble: Celebrities)	手足	–	Musician "Sun Yongzhi" songwriting, pays tribute to heroes fighting pandemic

=== Music videos ===
Year	English Title	Chinese Title	Director	Notes
2007	I'm Most Resounding	我最响亮	Lu Chuan	Included in Super Boy 07 Top 13 Compilation Album, Super Boy 07 Theme Song
2007	Love Is One Person Matter	爱是一个人的事	Wang Lian	Included in Super Boy 07 Top 13 Compilation Album
2007	If I Could Love You	如果，可以爱你	–	If I Could Love You, Single EP
2009	Waltz of Love	爱的华尔兹	Wang Yang	TV series "Meteor Shower" Sub Theme, Qing Hua Computer Ad Song
2009	Let Me Sing A Song For You	让我为你唱首歌	-	TV series "Meteor Shower" Theme Song
2009	Fall in Love	陷入爱里面	CHANG	Included in "Hug" Album
2009	I'm Not That Handsome	我没那么帅	–	Included in "Hug" Album
2009	Hug	拥抱	Oh Joon Sung	Included in "Hug" Album
2009	Playing Hand Drum And Sing A Song	打起手鼓唱起歌	Peng Yuan	Include in Shining of Red Star Album
2015	Flaming Love	炙爱	–	Film "Ulterior Motive" Theme Song
January 2016	Very Very Good (Ensemble: Celebrities)	棒棒哒	Movie "The New Year's Eve of Old Lee" OST	Movie "The New Year's Eve of Old Lee" Theme Song
January 2016	Mr Foolish	愚先生	Zheng Fan	Join Super Jet Entertainment First Single
2018	Song Ode	歌颂	–	iQIYI Animation "The Sound of Fox" Theme Song
2018	Love Confession Time	告白時間	–	TV series "Our Glamorous Time" Sub Theme Song
2020	Hand in Hand (Ensemble: Celebrities)	手足	–	Musician "Sun Yongzhi" songwriting, pays tribute to heroes fighting pandemic

== Filmography ==
=== Television series ===
Year	Title	Chinese title	Role	Network	Ref
2008	Ugly Wudi	丑女无敌	Yu Haoming	Hunan TV	
2009	Meteor Shower	一起来看流星雨	Duanmu Lei	Hunan TV	
2010	Meteor Shower II	一起又看流星雨	Duanmu Lei	Hunan TV	
2013	Love in Spring	爱在春天	Shen Jiahao	Hunan TV	
2013	8090 Dash Forward	8090向前冲	Jiang Tianya	Hunan TV	
2014	The Loving Home	把爱带回家	He An	Hunan TV	
2015	Shanghai Dawn	破晓	Xu Jingqi	Jiang Yin Channel, CCTV8, Dragon TV	
2016	Father's Identity	父亲的身份	Du Mingda	CCTV1	
2016	How Much Love Can Be Repeated	多少爱，可以重来	Xu Ran	CCTV8	
2016	Happy Mitan	欢喜密探	Teacher Hong	Youku	
2017	Nothing Gold Can Stay	那年花开月正圆	Du Mingli	Dragon TV, Jiangsu TV	
2017	Tribes and Empires: Storm of Prophecy	九州·海上牧云记	Gusong Tuo	Hunan TV	
2018	Our Glamorous Time	你和我的倾城时光	Gu Mingzhi	Dragon TV, Zhejiang TV	
2018	The Sound of Bell on the Bund	外滩钟声	Du Xinsheng	Zhejiang TV, Anhui TV	
2019	Empress of the Ming	大明风华	Zhu Gaoxu	Hunan TV	
2020	Mystery of Antiques	古董局中局之鉴墨寻瓷	Xu Yicheng	Tencent, iQIYI	
2021	New Generation: Emergency Rescue	我们的新时代	Zhao Xiaofei	Tencent, iQIYI	
2022	The Wind Blows From Longxi	风起陇西	Yang Yi (Shu Han)	CCTV8, iQIYI	
2024	Detective Chinatown	林森	Lin Sen	iQIYI	
2026	Swords Into Plowshares	太平年	Guo Rong	CCTV-1,iQIYI, MGTV, Tencent	
TBA	Palmistry	翻手为云覆手雨	Shen Liang		
TBA	Hunter James	神探亨特詹	Zan Tianyuan		
TBA	The Best of Times	最好的时代	Tan Jingchuan		
TBA	Our National Southwest Associated University	我们的西南联大	Cheng Jiawen		
TBA	Green Hills Can't Hide	青山遮不住	Hong Yuanshan		

=== Film ===
Year	Title	Chinese title	Role	Ref
2009	China Idol Boys	乐火男孩	Zhong Zijie	
2010	Fireworks	烟花	Terminal illness Patient	
2010	Say Love After Graduate	毕业才说爱	Qu Jiang Ming	
2013	Actually I'm OK	其实我还好	Yu Haoming	
2014	Once Upon A Time in the Old Bridge	大峰祖师	Xiao Li	
2014	Love in Your Dimension			
2017	Almost Perfect Love Actually	十全九美之真爱无双	Ning Caichen	
2017	Youth Dinner	六人晚餐	Xiao Bai	
2020	The Eight Hundred	八佰	Shangguan Zhibiao	
2023	Ping Pong: The Triumph	中国乒乓之绝地反击	Wang Yao	

=== Musical ===
Year	Title	Roles	Ref
2007	Azure Ship 蔚蓝船说	Baiyue Hero	

=== TV column plays ===
Year	Channel	Title	Role	Type	Genre	Perform of Song	Notes	Ref
2019	Hunan TV	Love Confession of Spacetime 时空的告白	Haoming	Special appearance	Situational	Let Me Sing A Song For You	Blue Moon Mid-Autumn Night <Make A Wish to the Moon>	

=== Hosting ===
Year	Title	Notes	Ref
2008–2010	Day Day Up 天天向上	Also briefly hosted the show in 2015	
2015	Day Day Up 天天向上	Also briefly hosted the show in 2015	

== Awards ==
Year	English title	Award	Role	Notes
2008	9+2 Music Pioneer Awards	Most Popular Online Song	"If Its Possible I Can Love You"	
2008	Top Ten Songs		"If Its Possible I Can Love You"	
2008	Newcomer Award	—N/a		
2008	Music Radio China Top Chart Awards	Most Promising Newcomer	—N/a	
2008	Music Radio China Top Chart Awards	Song of the Year	"If Its Possible I Can Love You"	
2008	5th CNTV's Music King Hit Global Chinese Music Award	Most Promising Male Newcomer	—N/a	
2008	Metro Radio Mandarin Hits Music Awards Presentation	New Singer Award	—N/a	
2008	8th Global Chinese Golden Chart Awards	Outstanding Singer (Guangzhou)	—N/a	
2009	9+2 Music Pioneer Awards	Top Ten Songs	"Falling in Love Inside"	
2009	Most Popular Online Song		"Falling in Love Inside"	
2009	Best Original Composed Song		"Falling in Love Inside"	
2009	Most Popular Male Singer (Top Five)	—N/a		
2009	Most Popular Online Singer	—N/a		
2009	China Gold Record Award	Best Newcomer (Mainland)	—N/a	
2010	Top Chinese Music Awards	Best Crossover Newcomer	—N/a	
2010	9+2 Music Pioneer Awards	Most Popular Online Song	"Hug"	
2010	10th Global Chinese Golden Chart Awards	Top 20 Songs	"Hug"	
2015	The 2015 Mobile Video Festival	Best Singer of the Year	—N/a	
2018	24th Huading Awards	Audience's Favorite TV Star	—N/a	
2019	4th China Quality Television Drama Ceremony	Performance Quality Star	—N/a	

== Explosive accident ==
On 22 October 2010, while filming the TV Series I Have a Date with Spring (我和春天有个约会) in Shanghai, Yu was injured in an explosive accident with co-star Selina, suffering third-degree burns over 39% of his body.
