= Here to Heart =

- Also known as: The Warm Chord
- Traditional Chinese: 溫暖的弦
- Simplified Chinese: 温暖的弦
- Hanyu Pinyin: Wēnnuǎn dě xián
- Genre: Romance; Melodrama
- Based on: The Warm Chord by An Ning
- Written by: Zhao Weina; Xie Xiaomi
- Directed by: Huang Tianren
- Starring: Hans Zhang; Janine Chang; Jing Chao; Jenny Zhang
- Country of origin: China
- Original language: Mandarin
- No. of seasons: 1
- No. of episodes: 48

Production
- Executive producer: Zhou Dan
- Production locations: Shanghai; London
- Production companies: Jumei Film and TV Media Co., Ltd; Shanghai Guanda Film and Television Culture Co., Ltd.

Original release
- Network: Hunan Television
- Release: April 30 – May 26, 2018

Here to Heart (Chinese: 温暖的弦) is a 2018 Chinese television series starring Hans Zhang, Janine Chang, Jing Chao and Jenny Zhang. It is based on the novel The Warm Chord by An Ning. It airs on Hunan TV from April 30 to May 26, 2018.

== Synopsis ==
Zhan Nanxian is a sharp young man who was able to foresee the technological boom. He collaborated with his classmates to create a company and was able to weather the storm despite only 10% chance of success. Wen Nuan is an accomplished career woman who quits her high-paying job in England to work with Nanxian as his executive assistant. They were a couple previously and Wen Nuan is determined not only to help Nanxian at work, but also to rekindle the love that they have lost. This story is about the endless journey of love, and the two hearts lost and rekindled after 7 years of separation.

== Cast ==
=== Main ===
- Hans Zhang plays Zhan Nanxian, CEO of Qianyu Company, a nominal boyfriend of Bo Yixin, he ended up living with Wen Nuan.
  - Yao Junzhe as young Zhan.
- Janine Chang as Wen Nuan, a staff member in Qianyu Company, a nominal girlfriend of Zhu Linlu, she ends up living with Zhan Nanxian.
  - Wang Zixuan as young Wen.
- Jing Chao as Zhu Linlu, a nominal boyfriend of Wen Nuan.
  - Lin Yongju as young Zhu.
- Jenny Zhang as Bo Yixin, an actress, a nominal girlfriend of Zhan Nanxian, finally living with Pan Wei Ning.
  - Shang Siqi as young Bo.

=== Supporting ===
- Jie Bing as Zhu Yi
- Zheng Xiaozhong as Zhu Ze
- Qiang Yu as Zhu Linghong.
- Zhou Qiqi as Wen Rou, elder sister of Wen Nuan.
- Jin Zehao as Guan Ti, founder of Qianyu Company, Zhan Nanxian's close friend, he loves Ding Xiaodai.
- Ji Xiaobing as Gao Fang, founder of Qianyu Company, Zhan Nanxian's close friend.
- Guo Zi Qian as Ding Xiaodai, a staff member in Qianyu Company, secretary of Zhan Nanxian.
- Pan Hong as Zhan Nanxian's mother.
- Ma Qiuzi as Du Xintong, a staff member in Qianyu Company.
- Chen Weidong as Guo Ruqian, Du Xintong's husband.
- Liang Dawei as Pan Wei'an
- Li Xinzhe as Liu Rui, assistant of Wen Rou.
- Cai Gang as Leng Rufeng

== Music ==
No.	Title	Lyrics	Music	Singers	Length
1.	"Miserable Warmth (最暖的忧伤)" (Opening theme)	Yao Ruolong	Chen Xiaoxia	Hebe Tien	04:28
2.	"Jue (倔)" (Ending theme)	Qiao Chen	He Shan	Yan Zhilin	04:02
3.	"The Positive and Negative of Love (爱的正负极)" (Interlude)	Xu Qi	He Shan	Tank / Boon Hui Lu	03:48
4.	"Not Dare (不敢)" (Interlude)	Lan Xiaoxie	Zhao Bei'er	Janice Yan	04:49
5.	"Looking at the Rainbow after the Rain (雨后一起看彩虹)" (Interlude)	Alex Chiang Jien (Zhangjian Junwei)	Alex Chiang Jien (Zhangjian Junwei) / Oliver	Alex Chiang Jien (Zhangjian Junwei)	04:11
6.	"If Without You (如果没有你)" (Interlude)	Francis Lee	Zuo Anan	Hans Zhang

== Production ==
Jumei Film and TV Media Co., Ltd and Shanghai Guanda Film and Television Culture Co., Ltd. bought the television series rights to the 2008 novel Here to Heart written by An Ning.

On June 13, 2017, Huang Xiaoming announced that he was cast in the series on his Sina Weibo, but was later replaced by Hans Zhang.

Production started in June 2017 and ended on November 22, 2017. Most of the series was shot on location in Shanghai and London.

The series marked the third collaboration between Hans Zhang and Janine Chang. They had worked previously on Fairytale (2012) and The Four (2015).

== Ratings ==
Hunan TV CSM52 ratings
Original air date	Ratings (%)	Audience share (%)	Rank
2018.4.30	0.526	2.04	5
2018.5.1	0.676	2.48	6
2018.5.2	0.792	3.03	5
2018.5.3	0.835	3.20	4
2018.5.4	0.565	2.17	6
2018.5.5	0.562	2.04	5
2018.5.6	0.782	2.79	4
2018.5.7	0.921	3.50	3
2018.5.8	0.945	3.67	3
2018.5.9	0.979	3.85	3
2018.5.10	1.051	3.98	3
2018.5.11	0.614	2.33	4
2018.5.12	0.715	2.76	3
2018.5.13	0.921	3.63	3
2018.5.14	1.023	4.05	1
2018.5.15	0.955	3.77	1
2018.5.16	0.995	3.95	1
2018.5.17	0.928	3.64	1
2018.5.18	0.588	2.41	4
2018.5.19	0.596	2.36	5
2018.5.20	0.844	3.20	2
2018.5.21	0.875	3.39	1
2018.5.22	0.928	3.60	1
2018.5.23	1.035	4.08	1
2018.5.24	0.981	3.88	2
2018.5.25	0.539	2.24	4
2018.5.26	0.637	2.54	3
2018.5.27	0.694	2.71	4

== Reception ==
Here to Heart was well received when it premiered in Hunan Television. The series was ranked first in the ratings on May 8, 2018. As of May 9, 2018, Here to Heart has 1.5 billion viewers. On May 11, the series has been watched 2 billion times.
