= Zheng Shuang (actress, born 1991) =

Chinese actress (born 1991)

- 郑爽
- Born: Zheng Yihan; 22 August 1991 (age 35); Shenyang, Liaoning, China
- Education: Beijing Film Academy (BA)
- Occupations: Actress; singer
- Years active: 2009–2021
- Agents: EE-Media (2009–2015); Zheng Shuang Studio (2016–2021)
- Spouse: Zhang Heng (m. 2019; div. 2020)
- Children: 2

Zheng Shuang
- Simplified Chinese: 郑爽
- Traditional Chinese: 鄭爽
Transcriptions
Standard Mandarin
- Hanyu Pinyin: Zhèng Shuǎng

Zheng Yihan
- Simplified Chinese: 郑意涵
- Traditional Chinese: 鄭意涵
Transcriptions
Standard Mandarin
- Hanyu Pinyin: Zhèng Yìhán

Zheng Shuang (born Zheng Yihan; 22 August 1991) is a Chinese actress. She rose to fame with her role as Chu Yuxun in Meteor Shower (2009–2010), becoming the youngest actress to be nominated for Best Actress at the China TV Golden Eagle Award. She is also known for her roles in TV series Swords of Legends (2015) and Love O2O (2016). She was chosen by Southern Metropolis Daily as one of the "Four Dan Actresses of the post-90s Generation".

In 2021, Zheng's career was suspended after being involved in a series of scandals about tax evasion and surrogacy.

== Education ==
Zheng Shuang received a Bachelor of Arts with a major in performing arts from Beijing Film Academy in 2011.

== Career ==
=== 2009–2013: Beginnings and rising popularity ===
In 2009, Zheng made her debut in Meteor Shower, Hunan TV's remake of the hit Taiwanese drama Meteor Garden. The drama was a major hit in China, and shot Zheng to instant fame. She also released a single, "Love Waltz" for the OST. Zheng was nominated for the Best Actress award at the 25th China TV Golden Eagle Award, becoming the youngest actress to be nominated. Zheng subsequently reprised her role in the second season of the drama which aired in 2010.

In 2011, Zheng starred in Gordon Chan's fantasy film, Mural, which won her the Best New Actress award at the Hong Kong Film Directors' Guild Award. The same year she starred in action comedy film No Limit, and historical romance drama War of Desire.

In 2012, Zheng portrayed double roles in the historical drama Secret History of Princess Taiping, playing Princess Taiping and Princess Andingsi. In 2013, she starred in fashion romance drama The Queen of SOP 2, the sequel to the 2011 hit drama.

=== 2014–2020: Breakthrough and mainstream success ===
In 2014, Zheng starred in the hit fantasy action drama Swords of Legends, where she played a fox spirit. The popularity of the drama led to renewed recognition for Zheng, and she won the Audience's Favorite Actress award at the 13th Huading Awards.

In 2015, Zheng starred in her first period drama, The Cage of Love penned by Tong Hua. She won the Best Actress award in the Revolutionary-Era drama category for her performance at the 19th Huading Awards. The same year, she starred alongside Jing Boran in Love Weaves Through a Millennium, a remake of the South Korean time-travel romance drama Queen In-hyun's Man; and joined the travel-reality show Divas Hit the Road. With her high press coverage and successful works, Zheng won the Popular Actress award at the 1st China Television Drama Quality Ceremony.

In 2016, Zheng starred in the historical melodrama Chronicle of Life, based on the novel Lonely Courtyard in Late Spring by Fei Wo Si Cun. She then portrayed Ding Yuehua in the historical mystery drama The Three Heroes and Five Gallants, based on the 19th-century classic novel of the same name. The same year, Zheng co-starred with Yang Yang in romance comedy drama Love O2O, based on the novel of the same name by Gu Man. The drama was a major hit both domestically and internationally, leading to increased popularity for Zheng.

In 2017, Zheng starred alongside Chen Xuedong in Rush to the Dead Summer, a youth melodrama adapted from Guo Jingming's novel of the same name. The drama was praised for its realistic portrayal of youth and campus life, as well as its beautiful cinematography. She also co-starred in fantasy-adventure film Wu Kong, her first film in six years.

In 2018, Zheng starred alongside Luo Jin in the romance drama My Story for You. The same year, she participated in the creation of the script for science fiction romance drama Hi, I'm Saori, which she stars in. Forbes China listed Zheng under their 30 Under 30 Asia 2017 list which consisted of 30 influential people under 30 years old who have had a substantial effect in their fields.

In 2019, Zheng starred in the female-centric youth drama Youth Fight directed by Zhao Baogang. The same year she starred in romance melodrama River Flows To You alongside Ma Tianyu, based on Guo Jingming's novel Cry Me A Sad River. Zheng was set to star in spy drama Secret Keepers where she played double roles as an undercover agent and a Japanese spy. Secret Keepers was due to be released on 5 September 2020, but it was abruptly halted and postponed indefinitely on 2 September 2020. The postponement was due to a general blacklist by the state regulators on a co-actor, Zhao Lixin which meant that the production team had to edit Zhao out from the drama.

=== 2021–present: Career stoppage ===
==== Surrogacy ====
In January 2021, it was revealed that Zheng had two children born of surrogacy in the United States and had allegedly first demanded late term abortion at 7 months into the pregnancies and expressed annoyance when informed that it was illegal, then abandoned them after her relationship with their father turned sour. Surrogacy is not allowed in China, but due to legal loopholes, some Chinese citizens would seek to have children via surrogate mothers overseas. News of people resorting to surrogacy would usually face significant backlash in China.

Upon the release of the news, many brands started to drop her. Prada subsequently dropped her as their spokesperson due to the "significant recent media coverage" of her "personal life". Some, including London jewellery brand Lola Rose, Chinese cosmetics brand Chioture and hair care brand Aussie, had distanced themselves from her while others had deleted social media posts that had promoted her. Many of Zheng's fanclubs deleted their content pertaining to her and distanced themselves.

The scandal drew attention of the state regulators, releasing statements through various state media platforms that criticised Zheng's use of surrogacy and labelled her as a "problematic artist". Zheng has been blacklisted since 20 January 2021, with all existing entertainment activities relating to her cancelled. Various producers, when asked anonymously, said that no programmes would want to engage Zheng in the future. Awards won at the 13th and 19th Huading Awards were also rescinded by the awarding committee. On 20 February, Meituan Waimai, a Chinese food delivery app, classified "Zheng Shuang" as a sensitive word. If users fill in "Zheng Shuang" as the recipient or picker, they were not able to order food.

==== Tax evasion ====
In April 2021, Zhang Heng revealed his chat history with Zheng Shuang and her mother, showing Zheng received CN¥160 million (US$24.6 million) salary for an unreleased TV series, A Chinese Ghost Story. It was alleged that Zheng presented a lower taxable amount of CN¥48 million to tax authorities, while the rest was charged as fees by a company owned by her mother. China had introduced laws in 2018 to regulate the highest possible salary for an actor by pegging their salary between 40–70% of a film's production costs. This sparked an investigation into Zheng for possible tax evasion. In order to salvage the TV series, the production team decided to swap Zheng's face throughout the series with Peng Xiaoran's.

On 27 August 2021, it was reported that Zheng drew CN¥156 million for A Chinese Ghost Story, and had under-declared her income from it through a 'yin-yang contract' setup. (Note: Yin-yang contract: Two contracts are made for the same agreement. The 'yin' contract carries the true value of the agreement and is kept between the parties involved. The 'yang' contract carries a lower value of the agreement and is presented to authorities for tax evasion, capital gains, and other purposes.) She was found not declaring CN¥191 million between 2020 and 2021, evaded taxes of CN¥45.27 million, and underpaid her taxes by CN¥26.52 million. Zheng was charged with tax evasion by China's State Taxation Administration and ordered to pay CN¥299 million (US$46.1 million) as penalty for alleged tax evasion. Of the amount to be paid, Zheng had paid the evaded taxes and late fees, with the fine outstanding. Zhang was the agent suspected of facilitating the arrangement, and is currently being investigated for his role in the matter. The National Radio and Television Administration also ordered that all programs that Zheng had participated in, including A Chinese Ghost Story, to be taken off air.

Due to the ban from entertainment industry, Zheng was sued by investor over a canned television series and had to compensate the investor with CN¥60 million (US$8.21 million) for economic losses on 26 September 2023. In December 2023, Zheng Shuang was subjected to compulsory enforcement of 90.5 million yuan due to a contract dispute; previously, approximately 128 million yuan had been enforced.

== Personal life ==
In May 2018, Zheng Shuang met producer Zhang Heng when filming a reality show. The pair admitted to be dating in August 2018 and started a company together. The pair exchanged wedding vows in United States on 19 January 2019. However, they announced their breakup in December 2019. On 18 January 2021, Zhang revealed that he had been stranded in the US for over a year to take care of two children. The two children were born to US-based surrogate mothers on 19 December 2019 and 4 January 2020. Both Zhang and Zheng have since confirmed that they were the parents of the children. Zhang alleged that Zheng had abandoned the two children after breaking up and not wanting to sign legal papers which would allow the children to travel to China. Zheng had denied the allegations, and instead alleged Zhang was cheating on her in September 2019 and returned to China.

The fertility clinic which Zheng engaged is reportedly owed US$68,000 for the successful surrogacy. The clinic also reportedly confirmed Zheng's request to terminate the pregnancies at the seventh month, which was denied. The clinic further alleged that she wanted to pay them monthly to raise the children in the United States, instead of wanting to bring the children back to China.

She and her family also claimed that she did not abandon the children and had in fact been making arrangements since 2019 to fight for custody. On 23 January 2021, Zheng's father revealed in a video recording that the conversation which circulated online was made when Zheng and Zhang just broke up; the family just wanted to find all means to cut Zhang off from Zheng's life, instead of not wanting the children. Zheng's father also mentioned that the couple decided on having children via surrogacy due to poor health conditions resulting from Zheng's work, and he apologized for "not advising Zheng's decision-making process correctly."

In May 2021, the American court awarded full custody of the two children to Zhang on the basis that the children recognized Zhang as the only parent. At the same time, the court ordered Zheng to undergo treatment to stabilize her mental well-being for 6 months, and mandated Zheng to interact with the children 3 times a week to allow them to establish a familial connection. In January 2023, Zhang alleged that Zheng had caused injuries to the children, and both would appear in the family court over custodial issues that month.

In early 2025, allegations of Zheng being a mistress of Chinese billionaire Ye Yanwei in the United States surfaced. Although Zheng denied the allegations, Ye's son, Ye Runtong, claimed otherwise on his social media account.

== Filmography ==
=== Film ===
Year	English title	Chinese title	Role	Notes/Ref.
2011	No Limit	无极限之危情速递	Xiao'an	
2011	Mural	画壁	Mudan	
2017	Wu Kong	悟空传	Ah Yue	

=== Television series ===
Year	English title	Chinese title	Role	Notes/Ref.
2009	Meteor Shower	一起来看流星雨	Chu Yuxun	
2010	Meteor Shower II	一起又看流星雨	Chu Yuxun	
2011	Secret History of Empress Wu	武则天秘史	Princess Taiping (teenage)	
2011	War of Desire	凰图腾	Ning Caidie	
2012	Secret History of Princess Taiping	太平公主秘史	Princess Taiping / Princess Andingsi (teenage)	
2012	Fairytale	童话二分之一	An Qi'er	Guest appearance
2013	The Queen of SOP 2	胜女的时代	Mu Xiaoyan / Fang Yifei	
2014	Swords of Legends	古剑奇谭	Xiang Ling	
2014	Wonder Lady	极品女士	Sha Sha Guimi	Cameo
2015	Love Weaves Through a Millennium	相爱穿梭千年	Lin Xiangxiang	
2015	The Four	少年四大名捕	Wen Bing'er	Guest appearance
2015	The Cage of Love	抓住彩虹的男人	Wu Caihong	
2015	Destined to Love You	偏偏喜欢你	Xiao Han	Special appearance
2016	A Happy Life 2	天天有喜2之人间有爱	Bai Xue	Cameo
2016	Chronicle of Life	寂寞空庭春欲晚	Wei Linlang (Liang'er)	
2016	The Three Heroes and Five Gallants	五鼠闹东京	Ding Yuehua	
2016	Love O2O	微微一笑很倾城	Bei Weiwei	
2016	Beauty Private Kitchens	美人私房菜	Song Yudie	
2017	Rush to the Dead Summer	夏至未至	Li Xia	
2018	My Story for You	为了你，我愿意热爱整个世界	Li Muzi	
2018	Hi, I'm Saori	我的保姆手册	Saori	
2019	Youth Fight	青春斗	Xiang Zhen	
2019	River Flows To You	流淌的美好时光	Yi Yao	
TBA	Secret Keepers	绝密者	Su Jiaman	Release uncertain due to surrogacy scandal
TBA	Jade Lovers	翡翠恋人	Shen Chenxi	Release uncertain due to surrogacy scandal
TBA	A Chinese Ghost Story	只问今生恋沧溟	Nie Xiaoqian	Release uncertain due to surrogacy scandal

=== Short film ===
Year	English title	Chinese title	Role	Notes/Ref.
2010	Kissing Fish	接吻鱼		
2010	Shutter Love	如果遇见	Xiao Han	
2014	The Twilight Saga	暮光之城	Bella	
2016	Jasmine Flowers	茉等花开		
2017	Zhu Xian: Yun Meng Valley	诛仙云梦川	Ling Long / Duo Yi	

=== Variety show ===
Year	English title	Chinese title	Role	Notes/Ref.
2015	Divas Hit the Road	花儿与少年	Cast member	
2016	The Greatest Love	旋风孝子	Cast member	
2018	This is Fighting Robots	这！就是铁甲	Cast member	
2019	Meeting Mr. Right	女儿们的恋爱	Cast member	
2020		让生活好看	Cast member	
2020		爆款来了	Cast member	
2020	Little Forest	奇妙小森林	Cast member	

=== Music video appearances ===
Year	English title	Chinese title	Singer	Notes/Ref.
2009	"Watching The Moon Climb Up"	看月亮爬上来	Jason Zhang	
2010	"The Left Side of the Wing"	左半边翅膀	Xu Fei	
2010	"Happy Advancement"	快乐出发	EE-Media stars	
2010	"Wishing For You"		EE-Media stars	
2011	"Giving Energy Youth"	给力青春	EE-Media stars	

== Discography ==
=== Singles ===
Year	English title	Chinese title	Album	Notes/Ref.
2009	"Love's Waltz"	爱的华尔兹	Meteor Shower OST	
2010	"Super Fantasy"	超梦幻	Da Huo Shui Ni OST	
2011	"Extreme Love"	极限爱恋	No Limit OST	with Hans Zhang
2015	"Can't Forget"	不能忘	Love Weaves Through a Millennium OST	with Jing Boran
2015	"Divas Hit the Road"	花儿与少年	Divas Hit the Road OST	
2020	"With You by My Side"	有你在身边		Charity song for Coronavirus

== Bibliography ==
Year	English title	Chinese title	Notes/Ref.
2017	Zheng Shuang's Book	郑爽的书	

== Accolades ==
=== Awards and nominations ===
Year	Award	Category	Nominated work	Result	Ref.
Major awards
2010	25th China TV Golden Eagle Award	Best Actress	Meteor Shower	Nominated	
2010	8th China Golden Eagle TV Art Festival	Most Popular Actress	Meteor Shower	Nominated	
2012	6th Hong Kong Film Directors' Guild Award	Newcomer Award	Mural	Won	
2012	31st Hong Kong Film Award	Best New Performer	Mural	Nominated	
2014	13th Huading Awards	Audience's Favorite Actress	Swords of Legends	Rescinded	
2016	19th Huading Awards	Best Actress (Revolutionary-Era Drama)	The Cage of Love	Rescinded	
2017	9th Macau International Movie Festival	Best Supporting Actress	Wu Kong	Nominated	
2019	Golden Bud – The Fourth Network Film And Television Festival	Best Actress	Youth Fight, River Flows to You	Nominated	
2019	Golden Bud – The Fourth Network Film And Television Festival	Popular Actress of the Year	Youth Fight, River Flows to You	Won	
Other awards
2009	China Radio International Online	Most Popular Actress	Meteor Shower	Won	
2009	Sohu Internet TV Festival	Most Popular Actress	Meteor Shower	Won	
2009	2nd Mengniu Music Chart Awards Ceremony	Best Cross-over Newcomer	Meteor Shower	Won	
2010	Sohu Internet TV Festival	Best New Actress	Meteor Shower II	Won	
2010	Sohu Internet TV Festival	Best Couple	Meteor Shower II	Won	
2010	Hunan Television Festival	Best Newcomer	—N/a	Won	
2011	Grand Ceremony of New Forces	Most Promising Film Newcomer	—N/a	Won	
2013	Entertainment Live Television Ranking	Most Influential Actress	—N/a	Won	
2013	Asian Idol Awards	Best Couple	The Queen of SOP 2	Won	
2015	Baidu Knowledge 10th Anniversary Award Ceremony	Most Shining Celebrity	—N/a	Won	
2015	Show Star Award Ceremony	Actress of the Year	—N/a	Won	
2015	Baidu Tieba Fantasy Carnival	Best On-screen Performance	—N/a	Won	
2015	The Actors of China Award Ceremony	Emerald Category: Actress	—N/a	Won	
2016	Powerstar Award Ceremony	Most Popular Actress	—N/a	Won	
2016	5th iQIYI All-Star Carnival	Popular Actress Award	The Cage of Love, Destined to Love You	Won	
2016	1st China Television Drama Quality Ceremony	Popular Actress Award	—N/a	Won	
2017	Asian Good Books Ranking	Best Cross-over Author	Zheng Shuang's Book	Won	
2017	Weibo TV Online Video Awards	Most Commercially Valuable Actor	Love O2O, Rush to the Dead Summer	Won	
2017	Weibo TV Online Video Awards	Weibo Fans Choice Award	—N/a	Won	
2017	Netease Entertainment Award Ceremony	Celebrity Collaborator	—N/a	Won	
2019	Sohu Fashion Awards	Fashion Figure of the Year	—N/a	Won	
2019	11th China TV Drama Awards	Young Marketable Actress	—N/a	Won	
2020	Weibo Awards Ceremony	Popular Artist of the Year	—N/a	Won	

=== Forbes China Celebrity 100 ===
Year	Rank	Ref.
2017	39th	
2019	67th	
2020	82nd	
