= Hans Zhang =

Chinese actor and singer (born 1983)

- Born: Zhang Han; 6 October 1983 (age 43); Qiqihar, Heilongjiang, China
- Education: Central Academy of Drama
- Occupations: Actor; Singer; Television producer
- Years active: 2008–present
- Agents: EE-Media (2009–2014); Zhang Han Studio (2014–present)

Chinese name
- Traditional Chinese: 張翰
- Simplified Chinese: 张翰
Transcriptions
Standard Mandarin
- Hanyu Pinyin: Zhāng Hàn

Hans Zhang Han (simplified Chinese: 张翰; traditional Chinese: 張翰; pinyin: Zhāng Hàn, born 6 October 1983) is a Chinese actor, singer and host. He graduated from Central Academy of Drama in 2007. Zhang is best known for his roles in Meteor Shower (2009) and Meteor Shower II (2010), Fall in Love (2011), The Queen of SOP (2012), Heroes in Sui and Tang Dynasties (2013), Boss & Me (2014), The Four (2015), Wolf Warriors 2 (2017), Here to Heart (2018), Sunshine of My Life (2021), and Gentlemen of East 8th (2022).

== Early life ==
Zhang Han was born in Qiqihar, Heilongjiang. He entered the Central Academy of Drama and majored in acting in 2003. At the start of his life, his prudishness led him to doubt his potential to be an actor. Zhang lingered around Beijing railway station to make a short video. He shot his video as a romantic love story, which sprung from the story of a ragged man. As a result of the video, Zhang was rewarded and was determined to stick with acting.

== Career ==
=== 2009–2011: Beginnings and rising popularity ===
Zhang graduated from Central Academy of Drama in 2007. He rose to fame for his role as Murong Yunhai in the popular Chinese romance comedy drama Meteor Shower (2009) and its sequel, Meteor Shower II (2010).

In 2010, he starred in the Korean-Chinese animal film Hearty Paws 2 alongside Song Joong-ki.

In 2011, Zhang hosted Hunan TV's variety program Great Sunday with Meteor Shower co-stars Peer Zhu and Vision Wei. The same year he starred in the romance drama Fall in Love, a remake of the South Korean television series Autumn in My Heart. He then reunited with Meteor Shower co-star in the action film No Limit; both also played a couple in the historical television series Phoenix Totem.

=== 2012–2016: Continued success ===
In 2012, Zhang starred in the romantic comedy drama The Queen of SOP alongside Joe Chen. It achieved high ratings throughout its run, leading to increased recognition for Zhang. He was recognized as the Most Influential Actor at the Asian Idol Awards, and was coined Mainland's "No.1 Idol Actor" for his successful work in idol dramas.

In 2013, Zhang starred in historical drama Heroes in Sui and Tang Dynasties. which was met with high ratings and positive reviews from critics. Zhang won the Most Popular Actor award at the 19th Shanghai Television Festival. The same year, he starred in the romance television series The Colors of Youth, where he portrayed 11 different personalities in one character.

In 2014, Zhang joined the travel reality program Divas Hit the Road. The series was a hit with the audience and continuously topped television ratings and popularity ranking throughout its run. He then starred alongside Zhao Liying in the romantic comedy drama Boss & Me, based on Gu Man's popular novel Come and Eat, Shan Shan. Boss & Me was a huge hit both domestically and overseas. Zhang won the Asian Star award at the Seoul International Drama Awards.

In a departure from his usual sunny roles, Zhang played 'Cold Blood' in the wuxia drama The Four (2015), based on the novel Si Da Ming Pu by Wen Ruian. The same year, he was also cast in the film adaptation of popular science fiction novel The Three Body Problem.

Following the establishment of his studio in 2015, Zhang announced that he would be taking part in the production of two upcoming dramas, The Rhapsody of a Summer Dream and If Paris Downcast.

In 2016, Zhang starred in the television adaptation of the Chinese mythical novel, Classic of Mountains and Seas. He was nominated for the Best Actor award at the Huading Awards. The same year, he starred in the crime thriller Ten Deadly Sins, based on the novel of the same name.

=== 2017–present: Acclaim ===
In 2017, Zhang co-starred in Wu Jing's action film Wolf Warriors 2. He received praise for his role as a factory heir and army fanatic. He then starred in the revolutionary drama film Eternal Wave alongside Aaron Kwok and Zhao Liying. The same year, Zhang played Run Run Shaw in the drama The Legendary Tycoon, which narrates the life of the tycoon.

In 2018, Zhang starred with an alongside Janine Chang in romance drama Here to Heart. His performance earned him a Best Actor nomination at the Asian Television Awards.

In 2022, a Chinese TV series Gentlemen of East 8th was released with Zhang as the producer, screenwriter, and star.

== Personal life ==
Zhang previously dated actress Zheng Shuang. The two confirmed the break-up of the five-year relationship in September 2014.

In early 2015, he dated actress Guli Nazha and the two broke up after 3 years in October 2017.

== Filmography ==
=== Film ===
Year	English title	Chinese title	Role	Notes	Notes/Ref.
2008	Turbulent Times	狂暴	Wang Xiaobing		Unreleased
2008	Kung Fu Hip Hop	精舞门	MC Haha		Cameo
2010	Hearty Paws 2	心心历险记2	Zhao Ming		
2011	No Limit	无极限	Wu Jixian		
2013	Night Cry	夜幕惊魂	A Han		
2015	An Inspector Calls	神探驾到	Qi Shijing		
2015	Chang Chen Ghost Stories	张震讲故事之鬼迷心窍	Zhong Yu		
2015	Youth Never Returns	既然青春留不住	Wang Jinhui		
2016	The Rise of a Tomboy	女汉子真爱公式	Ye Siyi		
2017	Wolf Warriors 2	战狼2	Zhuo Yifan		
2017	Eternal Wave	密战	Liang Dong		
2019	Guilt by Design	催眠裁決	Yang Kai		
TBA	The Three-Body Problem	三体	Pan Han		
TBA	The Missing	七夜追魂	Zhang Yunshui		

=== Television series ===
Year	English title	Chinese title	Role	Notes	Ref
2009	Meteor Shower	一起来看流星雨	Murong Yunhai		
2010	Meteor Shower II	一起又看流星雨	Murong Yunhai		
2011	Fall in Love	一不小心爱上你	Qin Lang		
2011	Phoenix Totem	凰图腾	Duan Feihong		
2011	The Han Triumph	大风歌	Zhang Shizhi		
2012	Secret History of Princess Taiping	太平公主秘史	Li Longji		
2012	The Queen of SOP	胜女的代价	Tang Jun /Tom		
2012	Fairytale	童话二分之一	Fan Yun		Cameo
2013	Heroes in Sui and Tang Dynasties	隋唐演义	Luo Cheng		
2013	The Colors of Youth	等待绽放	Liu Yiming		
2013	The Queen of SOP 2	胜女的代价2	Hua Tianqi		
2014	A Different Kind of Pretty Man	不一样的美男子	Yuan Shugao		
2014	Boss & Me	杉衫来了	Feng Teng		
2015	The Four	少年四大名捕	Leng Xue		
2016	The Classic of Mountains and Seas	山海经之赤影传说	Chi Yu/Xin Yuehu		
2016	Ten Deadly Sins	十宗罪	Hua Long		
2017	Gorgeous Workers	华丽上班族	Li Xiang		
2017	The Legendary Tycoon	传奇大亨	Gu Yanmei		
2018	Here to Heart	温暖的弦	Zhan Nanxian		
2018	If Paris Downcast	如果巴黎不快乐	Tong Zhuoyao		also producer
2021	A Love Story: You Are the Greatest Happiness of My Life aka “Sunshine of my Life”	若你安好便是晴天	Tang Mingxuan		
2021	One Boat One World	海洋之城	Guan Dingkai		
2022	Farewell to Arms	烽烟尽处	Zhang Songling		
2022	Gentlemen Attention Please	东八区的先生们	Tong Yu		
2024	Fateful Love	流光引	Jun Beiyue		
TBA	The Rhapsody of a Summer Dream	夏梦狂诗曲	Xia Chengsi		also producer
TBA	Saker Falco	猎隼	Song Wenbo		

=== Variety show ===
Year	English title	Chinese title	Role	Notes/Ref.
2015	Divas Hit the Road	花儿与少年	Cast member	
2019	The Inn	亲爱的·客栈	Cast member	

== Discography ==
Year	English title	Chinese title	Album	Notes
2009	"Picking Up Memories"	拾忆	Meteor Shower OST	
2009	"Stars' Language"	星空物语	Meteor Shower OST	with Yu Haoming, Vision Wei & Zhu Zixiao
2009	"Let Me Sing For You"	让我为你唱首歌	Meteor Shower OST	with Yu Haoming, Vision Wei & Zhu Zixiao
2010	"Accidentally Fall in Love"	一不小心爱上你	Fall in Love OST	with Vivi Jiang
2011	"Great Sunday"	给力星期天	—N/a	Glee Sunday theme song with Vision Wei & Zhu Zixiao
2011	"Glee Sunday"	—N/a	—N/a	Glee Sunday theme song with Vision Wei & Zhu Zixiao
2011	"A Sweet Risk"	甜蜜的冒险	—N/a	
2011	"Extreme Love"	极限爱恋	No Limit OST	with Zheng Shuang
2012	"Be the friend that loves you"	做最爱你的朋友	The Queen of SOP OST	
2013	"An Angel's Tears"	天使之泪	The Queen of SOP 2 OST	
2014	"The Wind's Promise"	风之诺言	Boss & Me OST	
2015	"Hero in the Wind"	风中英雄	The Four OST	
2015	"Racing With Time"	和时间赛跑	Gorgeous Workers OST	
2015	"Get Lost Song"	滚蛋歌	Youth Never Returns OST	
2016	"Don't Ask"	莫问	The Classic of Mountains and Seas OST	
2018	"If There Isn't You"	如果没有你	Here to Heart OST	
2018	"If There is Downcast"	如果那里不快乐	If Paris Downcast OST	
2018	"Be with you"	—N/a	If Paris Downcast OST	with Ya Zheng

== Awards and nominations ==
Year	Award	Category	Nominated work	Results	Ref.
2009	Sohu Internet TV Festival	Most Popular Actor	Meteor Shower	Won	
2009	Sohu Internet TV Festival	Top Ten Classic Characters	Meteor Shower	Won	
2010	4th Tencent Star Awards	Most Promising TV Actor	Meteor Shower	Won	
2010	Sina Internet TV Festival	Most Promising TV Artist	Meteor Shower	Won	
2010	10th Top Chinese Music Awards	Best Crossover Male Artist	—N/a	Won	
2010	Sohu Internet TV Festival	Best Couple (with Zheng Shuang)	Meteor Shower II	Won	
2010	Sohu Internet TV Festival	Best New Male Artist	Meteor Shower II	Won	
2011	Grand Ceremony of Movie & TV New Forces	Most Popular Actor	—N/a	Won	
2011	Sohu TV Drama Awards	Ratings Contribution Award	Fall in Love	Won	
2012	1st Asian Idol Awards	Most Marketable Actor	The Queen of SOP	Won	
2013	19th Shanghai Television Festival	Most Popular Actor	Heroes in Sui and Tang Dynasties	Won	
2013	2nd Asian Idol Awards	Most Popular Actor	The Queen of SOP 2	Won	
2013	2nd Asian Idol Awards	Most Popular Couple (with Zheng Shuang)	The Queen of SOP 2	Won	
2014	Sohu Fashion Awards	Television Actor of the Year	—N/a	Won	
2014	Star Moon Award Ceremony	Most Popular Television Actor	Boss & Me	Won	
2015	Weibo Award Ceremony	Popularity Award	Boss & Me	Won	
2015	10th Seoul International Drama Awards	Asian Star Award	Boss & Me	Won	
2015	Asian Influence Awards Oriental Ceremony	Most Popular Actor (Mainland China)	The Four	Won	
2016	Sina Weibo Fan Festival	Person of the Year	—N/a	Won	
2016	Cosmo Beauty Award Ceremony	Beautiful Idol Award	—N/a	Won	
2016	iQiyi All-Star Carnival	Most Popular Television Actor	—N/a	Won	
2017	Asian Influence Awards Ceremony	Most Capable Actor	—N/a	Won	
2017	11th Tencent Video Star Awards	Breakthrough Film Actor	Wolf Warriors 2	Won	
2017	1st Marianas International Film Festival	Best Supporting Actor	Wolf Warriors 2	Won	
2018	34th Hundred Flowers Awards	Best Supporting Actor	Wolf Warriors 2	Nominated	
2018	23rd Asian Television Awards	Best Actor	Here to Heart	Nominated	
2018	10th China TV Drama Awards	Breakthrough Television Actor	—N/a	Won	
