= Jane Wu =

Chinese actress (born 1989)

- Born: 5 September 1989 (age 36); Liaoning, China
- Occupation(s): Actress, producer, fashion designer
- Years active: 2010–present

Wu Jingxuan (Chinese: 吴靖萱) or Jane Wu, formerly known as Hu Mengyuan (Chinese: 胡梦媛) or Melrose Hu, is a Chinese actress, producer and fashion designer.

As Hu Mengyuan (Melrose Hu), she debuted as a female killer in the movie No Limit in 2011, and starred in Angel Warriors in 2013. In 2013, she was named "Top Ten Sexiest Female Agents" along with Fan Bingbing, Tang Wei, and Shu Qi. She starred in the 2014 film Ameera.

After moving to Hollywood, she changed her names to Jane Wu and Wu Jingxuan, and produced and appeared in several films.

== Filmography ==
Year	Title	Role	Notes
2020	The Madness	Executive Producer	directed by Danial Hajibarat
2017	Behind the Spotlight	Host/Producer	
2016	Teenage Mutant Ninja Turtles: Out of the Shadows	Jade	
2016	Captain America: Civil War	UN Staffer Wu	
2015	A Children's Song	Jane/Producer	
2014	Ameera 特工艾米拉	Ameera	
2013	Angel Warriors 铁血娇娃	YanYan	
2011	No Limit 无极限		
