= Angel Warriors =

- Film poster
- Traditional Chinese: 鐵血嬌娃之叢林日記
- Simplified Chinese: 铁血娇娃之丛林日记
- Hanyu Pinyin: Tiě Xuè Jiāo Wá Zhī Cóng Lín Rì Jì
- Jyutping: Tit3 Hyut3 Giu1 Wa1 Zi1 Cung4 Lam4 Jat6 Gei3
- Directed by: Fu Huayang
- Written by: Fu Huayang; Xu Shalang
- Produced by: Bruce Ren; Hu Jie; Fu Huayang; Bowie Lau; Lin Fengfa; Zhang Jianmin
- Starring: Collin Chou; Yu Nan; Xing Yu; Andy On
- Cinematography: Kwong Ting Wo; Xu Hongbing
- Edited by: Chen Xiaohong; Marco Mak
- Music by: Hei Jian
- Production companies: Shanghai Film Group; Shanghai Film Studio; Guangdong Lily Blue Flame Media; Sabre Works
- Release date: 1 November 2013
- Country: China
- Languages: Mandarin; Thai

Angel Warriors is a 2013 Chinese action film directed by Fu Huayang and starring Collin Chou, Yu Nan, Xing Yu and Andy On. It was filmed on location in China and Thailand. The film held its premier in Beijing on 28 October 2013 and was released throughout China four days later on 1 November 2013.

== Plot ==
Somewhere in Southeast Asia, a group of five extreme outdoor female Chinese backpackers arrives at the entrance to Kana Jungle, home of the untamed, aboriginal Tiger Tribe. The group's leader is Bai Xue (Yu Nan), a wealthy company CEO; the others are Ta (Mavis Pan), a wild animal protectionist, Yanyan (Patricia Hu), a dancer and martial artist, Tongtong (Wu Jingyi), an archaeologist and polyglot, and Bai Xue's cousin Dingdang (Wang Qiuzi), who sells outdoor clothing on the internet. All of the women have been friends since childhood; also joining them is former professional soldier Wang Laoying (Collin Chou), best friend and former comrade-in-arms of Bai Xue's late younger brother Bai Yun. Meeting them at the entrance to Kana Jungle is US-educated Dennis (Andy On), who says he is making a documentary for National Geographic, and his Tiger Tribe friend Sen (Shi Yanneng), who is engaged to Princess Haer (Wangdan Yili) and will act as guide for Dennis' group. Bai Xue's group and Dennis had met by chance in Pattaya, Thailand, three days earlier and had decided to team up. However, after they are all threatened by a tiger the first night in camp, and Dennis' men suddenly produce Uzis to scare it off, the women become suspicious and next day decide to go on their own. They are later attacked by the Tiger Tribe, and Yanyan, Dingdang and Tongtong are captured for sacrifice. Ta goes missing, but Bai Xue and Laoying try to rescue their three friends. Meanwhile, Dennis' group is also attacked by the Tiger Tribe, and only he and Sen separately survive. Dennis, whose real mission was to steal the tribe's store of precious stones, reports back to his father. Enraged, the latter decides to send in an elite force of mercenaries, led by Black Dragon (Kohata Ryu), to get the job done.

== Cast ==
- Collin Chou
- Yu Nan as Bai Xue
- Xing Yu
- Andy On
- Mavis Pan Shuang-Shuang as Ta
- Wangdan Yili
- Lawrence Shi
- Ryu Kohata
- Melrose Hu as Yan Yan
- Wu Jingyi as Tongtong
- Wang Qiuzi as Dingdang
- Renata Tan
- Roy Cheung
- Rock Ji
- Tang Jin
