= Rush to the Dead Summer =

2006 novel by Guo Jingming

Rush to the Dead Summer (Chinese: 夏至未至) is a novel written by Guo Jingming. It was first published in 2006 by Chunfeng Literature and Art Press. The story revolves around several young students, and is among Guo's most popular romance books. The full name of the novel is 1995-2005 Rush to the Dead Summer. Three editions have been released so far.

== Characters ==
- Li Xia - A common girl born in a poor family.
- Fu Xiaosi - Li Xia's friend, likes drawing and finally becomes a famous painter.
- Lu Zhiang - A friend of Li Xia and Fu Xiaosi, likes painting and drawing.
- Yu Jian - Li Xia's best girl friend.
- Cheng Qiqi - Li Xia's former friend, but ends up betraying her.
- Qing Tian - A boy in love with Yu Jian.
- Li Yanran - A spoiled girl who likes Fu Xiaosi.

== Synopsis ==
The story is set in a fictitious city called Qian Chuan. The events described in the story happen during a ten-year period, and express the doubts of young people who are in secondary school and just entering society. The novel begins in a city known for tall camphor trees. The protagonists study in a high school and the story begins in a warm summer.

Lu Zhiang used to be an outgoing and kind boy, but after his mother died of cancer, he turned into a silent boy. Fu Xiaosi becomes a well-known artist because of the Jingchuan Art Competition. Li Xia, who likes Fu, finally wins his affection. After graduating, they all part company, each going his own way. Li Xia goes to Beijing for further study with Fu, Lu Zhiang goes to Japan and Cheng Qiqi goes to Shanghai. They all finally enter officially in the adult world, where all of them will fight for their dreams. However, in face of Lu's imprisonment, Cheng's betrayal, Li's departure... They are faced with incredible problems. Everyone is changing and they become doubtful about the pureness of love and the origin of friendship.

== Quotations ==
The incidents which we considered had happened never happened. The people who we conceived we had loved, however, loved us forever.

== Television adaptation ==
In 2017, a television adaptation of the novel was released over the summer, starring idol-actors Zheng Shuang, Chen Xuedong and Bai Jingting as Li Xia, Fu Xiaosi, and Lu Zhiang respectively. The soundtrack in the Chinese drama was highly praised, especially the song: Chaser of Light, Chinese: 追光者, sung by Yoyo Sham.
