= Xing Yu =

Chinese actor

- Born: Zhang Shuwu (张淑武); 27 December 1978 (age 47); Shandong, China

Chinese name
- Traditional Chinese: 行宇
- Simplified Chinese: 行宇
Transcriptions

Xing Yu, also known as Shi Xingyu (Chinese: 释行宇) or Shi Yanneng (Chinese: 释延能/释彦能) is a Chinese martial artist and actor, who was one of the 32nd generation Shaolin monks.

== Biography ==
At the age of 12, he went to the Shaolin Temple, where he stayed for 10 years. He began to act in movies in 1997, and was cast in 2004 in the movie Kung Fu Hustle, directed by Stephen Chow.

He plays secondary roles he has solicited for his kung-fu.

He got his first leading role in the film The Wrath Of Vajra.

His character dies in most of the major movies he is in.

He lives in Shenzhen, Guangdong (near Hong Kong), but he is still attached to Shaolin Temple.

He ran a Shaolin school in Shenzhen from 2000 to 2007.

== Filmography ==
Movies
Year	Title	Role	Notes	Ref.
1997	Emperor in Lust			
1999	The Northern Swordsman			
2000	Blood on Bullet			
2000	Payment in Blood			
2000	Unbeatables			
2001	Legend of Lust			
2001	The Internal Duel			
2001	Sinful Confession			
2001	Moods of Love			
2001	Set Me Free	Yu		
2001	Forever Love			
2001	Exfernal Affairs			
2001	Dragon the Master	Mr. Tong's Thai Boxer		
2001	Dark War	Rascal		
2001	Angel Cop "Final Crisis"	Thug		
2001	Spy Gear			
2001	The Story of Freemen	Coach		
2002	Black Mask Vs. Gambling Mastermind	Kong's Thug		
2002	Power King	Tiger		
2002	Starlets Sale			
2003	Soccer Clan			
2003	Boxing Hero	Crazy Bull		
2003	To Catch Thieves			
2004	Aan: Men at Work	Goon of Raghu Shetty		
2004	Kung Fu Hustle	Coolie		
2004	Shaolin Gang			
2006	Dragon Tiger Gate	Daemon		
2006	Fatal Contact	King		
2007	Flash Point	Tiger		
2007	Fool & Final	Muay Thai fighter	Hindi film	
2008	My Wife Is a Gambling Maestro	Dragon		
2008	Ip Man	Master Zealot Lin / Crazy Lin		
2009	Bodyguards and Assassins	Qing assassin		
2009	Kung Fu Chefs	Ah Choi / Brother Choi		
2010	Black Ransom	Rocky		
2010	Just Another Pandora's Box	Hang Yu (Wu Soldier C)		
2011	No Limit	Nengrang		
2011	Shaolin	Chingkung		
2011	Treasure Hunt	Fire		
2013	Journey to the West: Conquering the Demons	Fist of the Northstar		
2013	Princess and the Seven Kung Fu Masters	Tiger Hong		
2013	The Wrath of Vajra	K-29 (Shi Yanneng		
2013	Angel Warriors	Sen / Sam		
2013	The White Storm	Kanit (Drug Dealer)		
2014	Kung Fu Jungle	Tam King-Yiu		
2014	The Taking of Tiger Mountain	Bro 2		
2015	Keeper of Darkness	Hark		
2015	Oh My God			
2016	Super Bodyguard	Jiang Li		
2016	Line Walker	Ng Bak (Sniper)		
2016	The Deadly Reclaim	Wong Wai-Fu		
2016	Undercover Cops			
2017	S.M.A.R.T. Chase	Long Fei		
2017	The Thousand Faces of Dunjia	Tang Clan Leader		
2017	Legend of the Naga Pearls			
2018	Master Z: The Ip Man Legacy	Fu		
2018	Treasure Union	Guan Bou		
2018	The Bravest Escort Group	Ma Biao		
2019	The Heart	Brother Si		
2019	Whisper of Silent Body	Kou Young		
2022	New Kung Fu Cult Master 1	Sing Kwan		
2022	New Kung Fu Cult Master 2	Sing Kwan		
2023	Ride On	Dawei		
2023	Never Say Never	Owner of CJ Club		
