= Wolf Warrior 2 =

2017 film by Wu Jing

- Theatrical release poster
- Traditional Chinese: 戰狼2
- Simplified Chinese: 战狼2
- Literal meaning: War Wolf 2
- Hanyu Pinyin: Zhàn Láng 2
- Directed by: Wu Jing
- Written by: Wu Jing; Dong Qun; Liu Yi
- Produced by: List: Wu Jing; Jiang Ping; Zhao Haicheng; Li Yang; Zhao Jianjun; Xu Zhiyong; Jing Defu; Liu Kailuo; Deng Hao; Wu Yan; Joe Russo; Anthony Russo
- Starring: Wu Jing; Celina Jade; Frank Grillo; Hans Zhang; Wu Gang
- Cinematography: Peter Ngor
- Edited by: Cheung Ka-Fai
- Music by: Joseph Trapanese
- Production companies: Deng Feng International Media; China Film Group; Bona Films; Beijing Culture
- Release date: 27 July 2017 (China)
- Running time: 121 minutes
- Country: China
- Languages: Mandarin; English
- Budget: CN¥200 million (US$30.1 million)
- Box office: CN¥5.68 billion (US$874 million)

Wolf Warrior 2 (Chinese: 战狼2) is a 2017 Chinese action film co-written, co-produced, and directed by Wu Jing, who also starred in the lead role. The film co-stars Celina Jade, Frank Grillo, Hans Zhang, and Wu Gang. The film is a sequel to 2015's Wolf Warrior. It was released in China on 27 July 2017. The film tells a story of a loose cannon Chinese soldier named Leng Feng who takes on special missions around the world. In this sequel, he finds himself in an unnamed African country protecting medical aid workers from local rebels and vicious arms dealers.

In China, Wolf Warrior 2 received praise for its patriotic plot, special effects, action sequences and the cast's performances. It was a massive commercial success and was the highest-grossing Chinese film ever released until 2021. The film broke numerous box office records, including the biggest single-day gross for a Chinese film as well as the fastest film to cross RMB 2 billion, 3 billion, 4 billion and 5 billion box office marks. It also became the fastest film to surpass US$500 million and the first film to gross more than US$600 million at the Chinese box office. At a total domestic gross of CN¥5.68 billion (US$874 million), it was the second highest-grossing film of at the time of its release in a single market behind Star Wars: The Force Awakens ($936.7 million in North America), and has exceeded North America's totals from Avengers: Endgame ($858.4 million), Avatar ($760 million), Black Panther ($700 million), and Titanic ($659 million). The film was the seventh highest-grossing film of 2017 at US$874 million, making it the 54th highest-grossing film worldwide. It is the first non-English film ever to be included in the list of 100 all-time highest-grossing films worldwide, making it the highest-grossing non-English film of all time, a position it retained until 2021 when The Battle at Lake Changjin, another film Wu starred in, took top spot. It was selected as the Chinese entry for the Best Foreign Language Film at the 90th Academy Awards, though it ultimately was not included among the five nominees.

== Plot ==
After the events of Wolf Warrior, Leng Feng and members of his special-ops team bring his fallen comrade's remains back to his hometown. As the family prepare for the funeral, a real estate company is about to demolish their house. The boss of the real estate company sneers at Feng and his team for their patriotism, and he is kicked to the ground. The boss orders his henchmen to attack Feng and his team, who swiftly disable them. Police arrive shortly after and order Feng to stand down. The boss boasts that he will "make the family wish they were dead", enraging Feng, who kills him. Feng is sent to a military prison for two years and then discharged from the Chinese army.

After his release from prison, Feng leaves for Africa, planning to wander aimlessly around the continent. While serving as a mercenary providing security for a freighter delivering relief supplies to Africa, he foils an attempted hijacking by Somalian pirates, defeating them in hand-to-hand combat underwater. For three years, Feng has been carrying a bullet he found, which was a clue to the kidnapping of his fiancée, Lieutenant Colonel Long Xiaoyun, that happened while she was on a mission.

Feng and some locals are partying on a beach when they are attacked by rebel forces aiming to overthrow the African nation. Shortly after the rebels and their mercenaries overrun the government troops, the Chinese fleet arrives to evacuate Chinese nationals. While on board a Chinese military ship, a shop owner that Feng rescued informs him that the bullet he is carrying belongs to European mercenaries who are helping the rebels. Feng volunteers to rescue workers at a Chinese factory and also a VIP, Dr. Chen, who was held hostage in a nearby hospital. Chen is developing a vaccine for Lamanla, a deadly endemic disease. However, Feng will be on his own; no Chinese military personnel could accompany him because they are on foreign soil, and must wait for permission from Chinese military leadership and United Nation Security Council approval.

Feng travels to the hospital; during the hostage rescue, Chen is accidentally killed by the rebels and their mercenaries. Dying, Chen tells Feng to take his daughter, an African girl named Pasha. The mercenaries are led by Big Daddy, a ruthless American working for Dyon Corps. Feng and Pasha, together with Rachel Smith, a surviving doctor, escape, but Feng cuts his hand when he falls on some Lamanla-infected corpses.

Feng continues to the Chinese-owned Hanbound factory to save the workers, among whom is his godson's mother. Upon arrival, Feng is confronted by the suspicious factory security team led by the factory owner's son, Zhuo Yifan, a cocky fuerdai young man who is also an ardent Chinese army fan. Feng informs everyone that the Chinese fleet plans to send a helicopter to rescue them. The women and children will evacuate via helicopter and everyone else will travel by road to join the fleet.

Big Daddy's mercenaries attack the factory to capture Pasha, as they believe she holds the cure for Lamanla. Feng rallies the workers to protect their families and their fellow factory workers. Feng is about to be overwhelmed and killed when Big Daddy and his men are unexpectedly ordered to fall back. The rebel leader informs Big Daddy that no Chinese can be harmed as he needs China's support when he comes into power, since China is a permanent member of the United Nations Security Council. However, Big Daddy kills the leader and takes over, ordering everyone back to the factory to capture Pasha and kill Feng.

Meanwhile, Feng chooses to leave after the factory workers discover that he is infected with Lamanla. Rachel injects him with a serum and he learns that Chen had discovered a cure using infected patients who survived and developed immunity. Pasha is one of Chen's patients and not his daughter; she is the only surviving patient with immunity.

Big Daddy and his men return to the factory and round up the workers. Feng returns with Rachel and Pasha in a rescue attempt. The workers are saved and a helicopter arrives to rescue them. Pasha and Rachel leave in the helicopter with the other women and children, but the helicopter is shot down. The battle continues with Feng and his allies fighting hordes of Dyon Corps mercenaries and rebels, who are reinforced by several tanks. Recognizing the threat, the Chinese fleet fire missiles to destroy the tanks.

Feng confronts Big Daddy and learns that the bullet which killed Xiaoyun belonged to Big Daddy. Driven by rage, he kills Big Daddy after a brutal fight. Feng then leads the survivors in a convoy through rebel territory until they reach the UN camp. In the mid-credits scene, Feng is allowed by his commander to return to his military squadron and is shown a video revealing that Xiaoyun is still alive.

== Cast ==
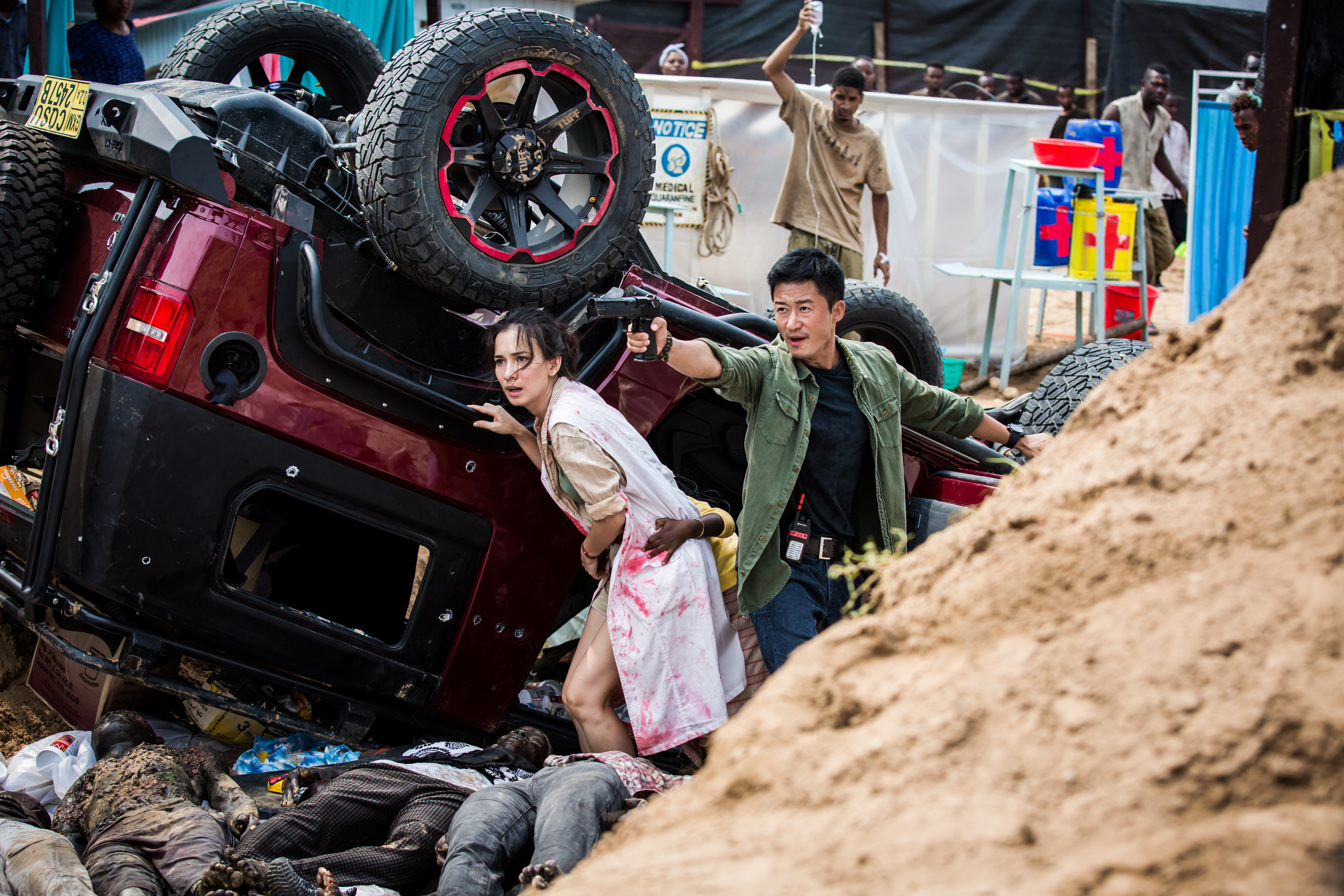
Wu Jing and Celina Jade on the set of Wolf Warrior 2

- Wu Jing as Leng Feng, a former Chinese special forces soldier.
- Celina Jade as Dr. Rachel Prescott Smith, a doctor working in Africa.
- Frank Grillo as Big Daddy, head of a group of mercenaries called Dyon Corps.
- Hans Zhang as Zhuo Yifan, a fuerdai and army fan. His father owns a factory in Africa which he supervises.
- Wu Gang as He Jianguo, a retired scout who serves as a security supervisor of a Chinese factory in Africa.
- Yu Nan as Lieutenant Colonel Long Xiaoyun (guest appearance)
- Yu Qian as Qian Bida, a profiteer who gets caught in a rebel crossfire battle in an African port town.
- Ding Haifeng as a captain in the People's Liberation Army Navy.
- Shi Zhaoqi as Shi Qingsong
- Chunyu Shanshan as Lin Zhixiong
- Oleg Prudius as Great Bear, a Russian Dyon Corps mercenary who serves as muscle and a heavy machine gunner.
- Heidi Moneymaker as Athena, a sniper of the Dyon Corps mercenaries.
- Aaron Ly as Ghost, the driver and the most stealthy member of the Dyon Corps mercenaries.
- Aaron Toney as Roach, a Dyon Corps mercenary and Big Daddy's second in command.

== Production ==
=== Background ===
Wolf Warrior 2 continues the storyline of Wolf Warrior. However, the action takes place overseas, rather than in China, which helps develop an international perspective. The film was shot on locations in Africa and China between June and November 2016. The film's African scenes were mostly shot on location in Soweto and Alexandria in South Africa. The tank battle was filmed in Zhaochuan Ironworks (坤源集团赵川铁厂), Zhaochuan Town of Xuanhua District, Zhangjiakou city, in Hebei province.

A promotional poster contained the slogan "Anyone who offends China, no matter how remote, must be exterminated."

=== Pre-production ===
Wu Jing started work on the script in 2009 and on 16 April 2013, the first draft of Wolf Warrior 2 was completed.

=== Filming ===
On 19 June 2016, the filming of Wolf Warrior 2 began in Beijing. Wu Jing spent six months preparing for the launch.

In one scene on 23 August 2016, Wu Jing drove a tank alone, rushed through six tanks and crushed a car in the end. In just ten seconds, the car turned into a pile of scrap iron. This is the first time that a domestic actor personally drove a tank into and crushed a car. A car weighs approximately one ton while a tank weighs around thirty-five tons.

On 2 November 2016, Wolf Warrior 2 was completed after five months of filming.

== Release ==
The film was released in China on 27 July 2017 in MX4D, 4DX, 3D and China Film Giant Screen. An IMAX version was released on 18 August 2017 and has gone out in IMAX 2D. The film was released in Sri Lanka through Madhu Entertainment with English subtitles. It was also released in South Africa with English Subtitles through Ster-Kinekor on 10 November 2017.

== Reception ==
=== Box office ===
Wolf Warrior 2 became a huge commercial success at the Chinese box office, and also in countries such as Australia and Malaysia where there were reports of sold out tickets in Chinese language cinemas. The film was noted for showing incredible staying power at the box office despite being a tent pole movie, earning seven times its prequel and five times distributors' initial estimates. It topped the international box office for all major films on three separate occasions – in its first three weekends. Its unprecedented success has been attributed to various reasons such as its patriotic subject, nationalistic themes, and its bona-fide action sequences and stunts that have been said to be a breakthrough for Chinese films. The film was also released during the annual summer "blackout period" in which foreign movies are not released, and it only had to compete with other domestic movies. It became the highest-grossing film in China after just twelve days of release, overtaking The Mermaid which held the record for eighteen months. However, the records that the film broke were not just limited to its domestic market. It also became the biggest film released in a single territory in 2017, breaking Beauty and the Beast's record of US$504 million and the biggest summer release of the year in a single territory, ahead of Wonder Woman (US$400 million). As a result, it became the tenth film to earn over US$500 million in a single territory and the sixth film to make over US$600 million, and the third film to pass the US$700 million threshold following Avatar and Star Wars: The Force Awakens. It is also the fastest film to reach the CN¥2 billion, CN¥3 billion, CN¥4 billion and CN¥5 billion marks in China, doing so on its eighth, eleventh, seventeenth and twenty-third day respectively and became the first film to earn more than CN¥200 million (est. US$30 million) for twelve consecutive days globally (tied with Star Wars: The Force Awakens). It has so far grossed a total of CN¥5 billion (US$716.5 million), which includes online ticketing fees, or around US$768.5 million with online surcharges and is among the top 100 highest-grossing films of all time, unadjusted for inflation. Due to the film's rising popularity and strong holds, analysts believe the film could end up making CN¥5 billion (US$747 million) to CN¥6 billion (US$895 million) at the Chinese box office alone.

It opened in China on Thursday 27 July 2017, across 19,000+ screens, occupying 42% of the nation's total screens and earned CN¥212 million (US$31.4 million) on its opening day. Including previews, the total stood at CN¥313 million (US$46.4 million). After four hours of advanced screenings Thursday evening brought in CN¥100 million ($US14.9 million) in ticket sales. Through word-of-mouth and social media, the audience grew in popularity. This resulted in the film posting an opening of CN¥975 million (US$144.5 million) – or CN¥921 million (US$136.7 million) without online ticketing fees – through Sunday, and US$125 million from Friday to Sunday. The latter figure is the biggest three day opening, ahead of The Mermaid which opened to US$122.3 million in the same number of days. This made it the top film released that weekend worldwide, even ahead of Christopher Nolan's Dunkirk. With the marketing success, the film's Sunday take rose 15% from Saturday's, a rare feat in a country where the biggest films are usually the most front-loaded. Also, its Sunday-Monday drop was just 35% and the screen count rose from 19,000+ to 24,000 (52%).

On Monday, it made CN¥279 million (US$41.5 million), a fall of just 35% from its Sunday take and registered the biggest Monday ever in a single territory ahead of Star Wars: The Force Awakens (US$40.1 million). This pushed the film past the CN¥1 billion threshold with a total of CN¥1.265 billion (US$187.8 million). This was followed by the biggest Tuesday with CN¥282 million (US$42 milliin), also ahead of Star Wars: The Force Awakens (US$37 million) and the fifth biggest Wednesday with CN¥278 million (US$41.4 million). By Thursday, the film had earned past CN¥2 billion, the fastest film to do so in the least amount of time.

In just ten days, the film grossed CN¥2.73 billion (US$406 million) to become the biggest release of 2017 there, surpassing The Fate of the Furious (CN¥2.6 billion) and the second highest-grossing film ever, behind only The Mermaid (CN¥3.39 billion). The film's demand was so strong that it made more in its second weekend than the first. Earning a total of CN¥1.092 billion (US$162.2 million), an increase of 30% from the previous weekend, it also set a new record for the biggest ever second weekend in a single territory, surpassing the previous record holder Star Wars: The Force Awakens (US$149 million). The 30% weekend-to-weekend hike is among the top ten smallest second weekend drop, and the smallest for a non-Hollywood production. The same weekend it passed the CN¥3 billion threshold with a total of CN¥3.159 billion (US$470.4 million) becoming the second Chinese film to reach the mark after The Mermaid. On 7 August 2017, it became the biggest ever Chinese film released just after twelve days of release. Similarly, The Mermaid overtook Monster Hunt in February 2016 after twelve days. The film began to shed a considerable number of theatres by its third weekend mainly to make room for new releases such as Guilty of Mind, The Adventurers and Legend of the Naga Pearls, resulting in the film falling by 49% earning another CN¥523 million (US$78.5 million), though still maintaining the top spot. Twenty five days after the film's release, it surpassed Avatar to become the second highest-grossing film in a single-territory and is behind only Star Wars: The Force Awakens. It topped the box office charts in China for four consecutive weekends, or a record breaking thirty consecutive days. It was eventually overtaken by French film Valerian and the City of a Thousand Planets on its thirty-first day. At that time, Valerian played 78,000 times while Wolf Warrior 2 was still screened 32,500 times. The film sold 159 million tickets at the Chinese box office.

Wolf Warrior 2 was the first Chinese film to enter Box Office Mojo's global all-time top 100, with a total of US$874 million at the box office.

The film remained the highest-grossing film in China until November 24, 2021, when it was overtaken by the war epic The Battle at Lake Changjin.

=== Critical response ===
In China, Wolf Warrior 2 received praise for its patriotic plot, special effects, action sequences and the cast's performances. As of August 2017, the film scored 7.6 on Douban versus the previous film's 6.8; on Mtime, it scored 7.5 versus 7. Film critic Zhang Chuan argued that the movie was "a decent Chinese film in visual effects, story telling, and action scenes", and that it was "comparable to its Hollywood counterparts" in terms of these aspects. The Global Times, a Chinese Communist Party tabloid, praised the film and criticized suggestions of it being propaganda. Wenhui Daily considered the film to be a milestone in the history of Chinese cinema with "stories, connotations, and structures". Several other Chinese state-owned and military-affiliated outlets praised the film.

However, its reception in China was not uniformly positive. By May 2020, the Douban rating dropped to 7.1 with the top positive and top negative reviews each receiving 39,148 and 35,822 supporters respectively. Yin Shanshan, a lecturer at the Central Academy of Drama, a top drama school in China, criticized the film as excessively violent and "psychopathic, worthless, without values or logic" on her Sina Weibo account. Tsinghua University Professor Xiao Ying echoed criticism from some foreign reviewers who found the film to be a Chinese imitation of Rambo: First Blood Part II'', and he contrasted this with greater praise for Dunkirk released in the same year.

Internationally, the film received more mixed responses. On the review aggregator website Rotten Tomatoes, Wolf Warrior 2 holds an approval rating of 67% based on 15 reviews, with an average rating of 5.8/10. Metacritic, which uses a weighted average, assigned Wolf Warrior 2 a score of 44 out of 100 based on four critics, indicating "mixed or average reviews". Multiple critics referred to the film as propaganda. Much of the criticism was directed towards the plot and screenplay, alleging similarities to Blood Diamond, Black Hawk Down, Tears of the Sun, and Rambo: First Blood Part II. Frank Scheck of The Hollywood Reporter wrote, "The star's charisma is enhanced by his athletic prowess, which makes the hand-to-hand combat particularly arresting, especially a brutal brawl between him and Grillo that provides a fitting climax. The breathless pacing thankfully doesn't allow much time for viewers to ponder the plot holes or worry about character development, although the two-hour running time results in overkill fatigue." Stanley Rosen, a professor at the University of Southern California who studies Chinese society and cinema, said to New York Times, "It's a very individualist personal quest, which is much more of a Hollywood thing. They're definitely downplaying the Communist Party in favor of patriotism and defending Chinese people and Chinese interests all over the world." Simon Abrams of RogerEbert.com severely criticized the film, labeling it "pro-military propaganda" and writing that "its characters' sense of patriotism is built on the back of racist assumptions that would, in a European or American narrative, be rightfully criticized for being part of an ugly 'white savior' power fantasy", and stated that the film "lectures you, pummels you, then expects you to cheer." Lily Kuo called the film's protagonist "China’s own version of the White Savior." Several academics similarly critiqued what they considered to be racist depictions of black Africans in the film.

Rob Hunter of the Film School Rejects, in his positive review of the film, wrote: "Wolf Warrior 2 still suffers some of the same issues that dogged the first film, but the improvements elsewhere make for a noticeably better and more entertaining action movie. It's a fun movie blending lots of action, some humor, and "feelings" for friends and family, and if the next one improves at this same rate Wolf Warrior 3 is going to be something even more special." In a less enthusiastic review, Noel Murray of the Los Angeles Times wrote that the "blandly generic" film features digital effects that "look fake," but praised its stunts and pointed out "it's fascinating to see a film so closely mimic big-budget Hollywood war pictures, but from an opposing socio-political perspective." Tom Phillips of The Guardian described the movie as "the undisputed torchbearer for this new generation of [Chinese] patriotic action dramas."

Evan Osnos points out how "Wolf Warrior II captures a new, muscular iteration of China's self-narrative, much as Rambo's heroics expressed the swagger of the Reagan era." Jonathan Papish from China Film Insider described the tone of Chinese nationalism in the movie as being "definitely a product of Xi's reign and the idea of [China's] rejuvenation".

== Accolades ==
Awards	Category	Recipient	Result	Ref.
12th Asian Film Awards	2017 Highest-Grossing Asian Film Award	—N/a	Won	
37th Hong Kong Film Awards	Best Film from Mainland and Taiwan	—N/a	Nominated	
9th China Film Director's Guild Awards	Best Film	—N/a	Nominated	
9th China Film Director's Guild Awards	Best Director	Wu Jing	Nominated	
9th China Film Director's Guild Awards	Best Actor	Wu Jing	Shortlisted	
44th Saturn Awards	Best International Film	—N/a	Nominated	
23rd Huading Awards	Best Film	—N/a	Nominated	
23rd Huading Awards	Best Director	Wu Jing	Won	
23rd Huading Awards	Best Actor	Wu Jing	Won	
23rd Huading Awards	Best Supporting Actor	Wu Gang	Won	
23rd Huading Awards	Best Screenwriter	Wu Jing, Liu Yi, Dong Qun	Nominated	
23rd Huading Awards	Best Producer	Guan Hailong, Zhang Miao	Won	
34th Hundred Flowers Awards	Best Picture	Wolf Warrior 2	Nominated	
34th Hundred Flowers Awards	Best Director	Wu Jing	Nominated	
34th Hundred Flowers Awards	Best Writing	Wu Jing, Dong Qun, Liu Yi	Nominated	
34th Hundred Flowers Awards	Best Actor	Wu Jing	Won	
34th Hundred Flowers Awards	Best Supporting Actor	Wu Gang	Nominated	
34th Hundred Flowers Awards	Best Supporting Actor	Hans Zhang	Nominated	

== Sequel ==
A sequel, Wolf Warrior 3 (Chinese: 战狼3), has been confirmed at the end of the mid-credits scene of Wolf Warrior 2. This was later confirmed by Wu Jing.

== Influence ==
Since its release the movie has been used for nationalist sentiments, most prominently by associating a group of Chinese diplomats and their approach as "wolf warrior diplomacy" by Chinese media.

== See also ==
- List of submissions to the 90th Academy Awards for Best Foreign Language Film
- List of Chinese submissions for the Academy Award for Best Foreign Language Film
