= Youth Never Returns =

- Poster
- Traditional Chinese: 既然青春留不住
- Simplified Chinese: 既然青春留不住
- Directed by: Tian Meng
- Written by: Gu Wei
- Produced by: Manfred Wong
- Starring: Hans Zhang; Joe Chen
- Music by: Chen Zhiyi
- Production company: Herun Film
- Release dates: 17 June 2015 (SIFF); 23 October 2015 (China)
- Running time: 92 minutes
- Country: China
- Language: Mandarin
- Box office: CN¥38 million

Youth Never Returns is a 2015 Chinese romantic comedy film based by the novel of Megan Tay & directed by Tian Meng and produced by Manfred Wong, starring Hans Zhang and Joe Chen. The film is an adaptation of Gu Wei's novel of the same name, and tells the love story of between two individuals that span across ten years. Principal photography started on August 25, 2014, in Jialing River.

The film premiered in Beijing International Film Festival in April 2015 with wide-release in China on October 23, 2015.

== Cast ==
- Hans Zhang as Wang Hui
- Joe Chen as Zhou Hui
- Wang Xiaokun as Feng Song
- Shi Yanfei as Zhu Ting
- Kuo Tzu-chien
- Chen Yalan
- Liao Juan
- Cao Hanchao
- Jia Shengqiang as Xie Yong
- Liu Ting
- Lin Xiaofan as Hu Feng
- Wang Xun
- Ni Jingyang
- Hua Zhou
- Denny Tan as Director Hu

== Music ==
- 还好有你 - Victor Wong
- 夜色 - Various singers
- 滚蛋歌 - Hans Zhang
