= Rush to the Dead Summer (TV series) =

2017 Chinese television series

- Drama poster
- Also known as: Love till the End of Summer
- Genre: Romance; Teen; Coming of age
- Based on: Rush to the Dead Summer by Guo Jingming
- Written by: Liu Fei; Liu Chenguang; Shi Shi
- Directed by: Han Yang
- Starring: Chen Xuedong; Zheng Shuang; Bai Jingting; Chai Biyun; Zheng Hehuizi; Pang Hanchen; Xia Zitong
- Country of origin: China
- Original language: Mandarin
- No. of episodes: 46

Production
- Production locations: Xiamen; Shanghai
- Running time: 40 minutes
- Production companies: China Syndication; Hunan TV

Original release
- Network: Hunan TV
- Release: 11 June – 8 July 2017

Rush to the Dead Summer (Chinese: 夏至未至; pinyin: Xiàzhì Wèi Zhì) is a 2017 Chinese television series based on Guo Jingming's novel of the same name; starring Chen Xuedong, Zheng Shuang and Bai Jingting. On 11 June 2017, the series aired on Hunan TV. The drama was acclaimed for its authentic portrayal of youth and campus life, along with striking cinematography.

== Synopsis ==
Li Xia (Zheng Shuang), a hardworking girl from a poor family, earns a scholarship to the prestigious Qian Chuan Secondary School. There, she befriends Fu Xiaosi (Chen Xuedong), a reserved, talented artist, and Lu Zhiang (Bai Jingting), a lively and charismatic student who acts as a loyal “guardian angel” to them both. Along with friends Cheng Qiqi (Chai Biyun) and Yu Jian (Xia Zitong), they share a vibrant high school life full of dreams and romance.

After graduation, their lives take different paths: Fu Xiaosi becomes a famous painter with Li Xia as his assistant and partner; Cheng Qiqi rises as a popular idol; and Yu Jian pursues singing overseas. But hardships soon follow—Lu Zhiang faces his mother's death and imprisonment, Cheng Qiqi betrays the group, and Li Xia leaves, causing the bright “summer” of their youth to fade. Lu Zhiang's once cheerful spirit turns somber as he struggles through loss. Over ten years, the story explores the fragility of friendship and the lasting power of memories amid growth and change.

== Cast ==
=== Main ===
| Actor | Character | Introduction |
|---|---|---|
| Chen Xuedong | Fu Xiaosi | An artist regarded as a legend by others. Despite his deep feelings for Li Xia, his actions caused her pain, ultimately leading to the end of their relationship. He remains at Qian Chuan, waiting for her return. |
| Zheng Shuang | Li Xia | She is a hardworking girl with a passion for drawing. She falls in love with Fu Xiaosi and becomes his assistant after graduation. However, their relationship is shattered by Cheng Qiqi's betrayal, leading Li Xia to leave him. |
| Bai Jingting | Lu Zhiang | He is a friendly and dependable friend to both Fu Xiaosi and Li Xia. After the death of his mother, he becomes more withdrawn and introverted. He is later imprisoned for assaulting a man who insulted Fu Xiaosi. Following his early release, he proposes to Yan Mo and marries her. |

=== Supporting ===
==== Qian Chuan Secondary ====
| Actor | Character | Introduction |
|---|---|---|
| Xia Zitong | Yu Jian | An independent orphan with a gifted voice, determined to become a singer despite challenges. She is a loyal friend to Li Xia, whom she considers her best friend. |
| Chai Biyun | Cheng Qiqi | Seen as perfect but inwardly insecure, she is Li Xia's longtime best friend. Her possessiveness toward Fu Xiaosi ultimately drives her apart from her friends. |
| Wang Yuwen | Li Yanran | A proud girl who grew up with Fu Xiaosi and harbors unrequited love for him. She repeatedly tries to sabotage his relationship with Li Xia. |
| Zhao Yami | Song Yingying | Li Xia's dorm mate and classmate, she is a cheerful girl who enjoys eating and admiring handsome men. |
| Jin Liting | Ren Xiaofei | Li Xia's dorm mate and classmate, she is a quiet girl who aspires to become a manga artist. |
| Jessie Li | Chen Wenjing | Li Xia's dorm mate and classmate, she enjoys gossiping and claims to be the head of Lu Zhiang's fan club. She transferred to another school after the first semester. |
| He Jiaxuan | Luo Xun | A student regarded as a childish troublemaker, he has had a crush on Cheng Qiqi since childhood. |
| Hu Yitian | Ou Jun | Student and Luo Xun's mate. |
| Wang Xinting | Yao Nana | Student |
| Zhao Zimeng | Liu Yang | Student |
| Ni Jingyang | Wen Ren | Form teacher, strict but loving teacher. |
| Wang Jinkun | Wu Kai | PE teacher. He loves Wen Ren and becomes her boyfriend. |
| Li Dong | Department Head Mao | |
| Zhou Yunshen | Teacher Luo | Chemistry teacher. |

==== Others ====
| Actor | Character | Introduction |
|---|---|---|
| Zheng Hehuizi | Yan Mo | From a wealthy background, she is a talented artist who returns from Japan and later marries Lu Zhiang. |
| Pang Hanchen | Duan Qiao | A kind architecture student who dates Yu Jian until a fatal car accident separates them. |
| Juck Zhang | Qing Tian | A bar singer and Yu Jian's first love, they separated due to life's realities. |
| Li Xian | Qing Yun | Li Xia's fiancé |
| Zhang Liao | Jie Xun | A hardworking man who eventually fulfills his dream of becoming a rock star. |
| Liu Tao | | Fu Xiaosi's father. |
| Zhao Qian | | Fu Xiaosi's mother. |
| Zhang Li | | Li Xia's mother, a resilient woman who works multiple jobs to provide the best for her child. |
| Song Tao | | Lu Zhiang's father |
| Li Lin | | Lu Zhiang's mother, an understanding lady who respects his child's opinions. |
| Fu Heng | | Cheng Qiqi's father, a businessman who is strict with his children and discourages Qiqi's ambition to become a singer. |
| Lin Jing | | Cheng Qiqi's mother, a meek woman who consistently chooses to yield. |
| Guo Qiucheng | | Li Yanran's father. |
| Rong Rong | | Li Yanran's mother. |
| Jiang Bing | Aron | Yan Mo's father, a head of a large company in Shanghai, who runs Fu Xiaosi's art career. |
| Shang Kan | Carol | Cheng Qiqi's manager. |
| Yang Shuwen | Ding Yiyang | The culprit who maligned Lu Zhiang. |
| Yan Qingyu | CEO He | |

== Production ==
The actors' original voices are used in this drama, with no dubbing. Filming began on August 5, 2016, at Guankou Middle School and ended on November 24. Guo Jingming acts as the artistic director of this series.

== Soundtrack ==
Rush to the Dead Summer - Original Television Soundtrack (夏至未至电视剧原声音乐大碟)
| No. | Title | Music | Length |
|---|---|---|---|
| 1. | "My First Memory (最初的记忆)" | Lala Hsu |
| 2. | "That Boy (那個男孩)" | Silence Wang |
| 3. | "Rush to the Dead Summer (夏至未至)" | Hu Xia |
| 4. | "Chaser of the Light (追光者)" | Yoyo Sham |
| 5. | "Starlight before Yesterday's Night (昨夜以前的星光)" | Zhang Yang Yang |
| 6. | "Haven't End (未至)" | Yisa Yu |
| 7. | "I Miss (我想念)" | Jin Zhiwen |
| 8. | "A Person's Scenery (一个人的风景)" | Milk Coffee |

== Ratings ==
| Episode | Original Air Date | (CSM52) | | (National Average) | | National Ranking |
| Episode | Original Air Date | Ratings | Audience Share | Ratings | Audience Share | National Ranking |
|---|---|---|---|---|---|---|
| 1-2 | June 11, 2017 | 1.144 | 3.951 | 1.44 | 5.43 | 1 |
| 3-4 | June 12, 2017 | 1.050 | 3.606 | 1.59 | 5.95 | 1 |
| 5-6 | June 13, 2017 | 1.110 | 3.785 | 1.64 | 6.04 | 1 |
| 7-8 | June 14, 2017 | 1.122 | 3.93 | 1.64 | 6.04 | 1 |
| 9-10 | June 15, 2017 | 1.224 | 4.248 | 1.79 | 6.66 | 1 |
| 11 | June 16, 2017 | 0.842 | 3.161 | 1.17 | 4.89 | 2 |
| 12 | June 17, 2017 | 0.754 | 2.813 | 1.18 | 5.13 | 2 |
| 13-14 | June 18, 2017 | 1.089 | 3.772 | 1.5 | 5.59 | 2 |
| 15-16 | June 19, 2017 | 1.105 | 3.864 | 1.49 | 5.46 | 2 |
| 17-18 | June 20, 2017 | 1.027 | 3.603 | 1.67 | 6.29 | 2 |
| 19-20 | June 21, 2017 | 0.961 | 3.31 | 1.69 | 6.26 | 2 |
| 21-22 | June 22, 2017 | 1.07 | 3.702 | 1.77 | 6.58 | 2 |
| 23 | June 23, 2017 | 0.855 | 3.058 | 1.31 | 5.37 | 3 |
| 24 | June 24, 2017 | 0.843 | 3.031 | 1.19 | 4.83 | 2 |
| 25-26 | June 25, 2017 | 1.104 | 3.735 | 1.7 | 6.38 | 1 |
| 27-28 | June 26, 2017 | 1.133 | 3.994 | 1.66 | 6.38 | 3 |
| 29-30 | June 27, 2017 | 1.124 | 4.011 | 1.8 | 6.9 | 3 |
| 31-32 | June 28, 2017 | 1.082 | 3.861 | 1.8 | 6.87 | 2 |
| 33-34 | June 29, 2017 | 1.215 | 4.246 | 2.1 | 7.78 | 2 |
| 35 | June 30, 2017 | 0.648 | 2.303 | 1.56 | - | 2 |
| 36 | July 1, 2017 | 0.661 | 2.384 | 1.15 | 4.69 | 2 |
| 37-38 | July 2, 2017 | 0.936 | 3.175 | 1.69 | 6.25 | 1 |
| 39-40 | July 3, 2017 | 0.935 | 3.264 | 1.54 | 5.8 | 3 |
| 41-42 | July 4, 2017 | 1.032 | 3.603 | 1.77 | 6.55 | 3 |
| 43-44 | July 5, 2017 | 1.107 | 3.798 | 1.91 | 6.93 | 2 |
| 45-46 | July 6, 2017 | 1.229 | 4.116 | 1.93 | 6.9 | 2 |
| 47 | July 7, 2017 | 0.916 | 3.386 | 1.46 | 6.1 | 2 |
| 48 | July 8, 2017 | 0.893 | 3.209 | 1.61 | 6.66 | 1 |
| Average | | 1.05 | 3.66 | 1.6 | 6.08 | - |

- Highest ratings are marked in red, lowest ratings are marked in blue

== Awards and nominations ==
| Year | Award | Category | Note | Status | Ref. |
|---|---|---|---|---|---|
| 2017 | The Actors of China Awards | Outstanding Actor | Bai Jingting | Won | |
| 2017 | The Actors of China Awards | Best Performance By An Actor | Bai Jingting | Won | |
