= Lost in White =

- Poster
- Chinese: 冰河追凶
- Directed by: Xu Wei
- Written by: Will Bu
- Produced by: Crystal Gong Chun; Wayne Wei Jiang; Zhang Yibai
- Starring: Tony Leung Ka-fai; Tong Dawei; Zhou Dongyu; Deng Jiajia; Vision Wei; Cao Weiyu
- Cinematography: Thierry Arbogast
- Edited by: Li Dianshi
- Music by: Taro Iwashiro
- Production companies: Fuxing Quanya Media (Shanghai); Gravity Pictures Film Production; Iqiyi Pictures; SMG Pictures; Beijing Chenming Media; Shanghai Lezai Qizhong Entertainment; Jiangsu Zhuci Pictures; Changchun Film Group; Beijing Tongyuemingxin Media; Beijing Reach-Gloria Media
- Distributed by: Dongyang Tiantian Shangying Pictures; Gravity Pictures Film Production; Huaxia Film Distribution
- Release date: 15 April 2016
- Running time: 90 minutes
- Country: China
- Language: Mandarin
- Box office: CN¥33.5 million

Lost in White (Chinese: 冰河追凶; pinyin: Bīng Hé Zhuī Xiōng) is a 2016 Chinese action crime mystery thriller film directed by Xu Wei. It was released in China on 15 April 2016.

== Plot ==
Ten years ago, four partners built a chemical plant in a picturesque village. In order to save costs, they discharged toxic wastewater directly into the river, which caused many newborns in the village to suffer from congenital disabilities. In order to deal with the toxic wastewater, the four partners turned against each other. Two of them were killed and the whereabouts of the other two are unknown. A stereotyped old policeman and a reckless young policeman became partners and formed the "murder chasers" to go deep into the glacier to track down the real murderer and find the truth. In the cold and murderous glacier, everyone is inevitably involved in a series of complicated events and become a member of the "murder chasers". But the final truth under the glacier subverts everyone's imagination.

== Cast ==
- Tony Leung Ka-fai
- Tong Dawei
- Zhou Dongyu
- Deng Jiajia
- Vision Wei
- Cao Weiyu

== Reception ==
The film grossed US$4.2 million on its opening weekend in China.
