= Love Weaves Through a Millennium =

- Promotional Poster
- Genre: Romance; Fantasy; Time travel Historical fiction
- Based on: Queen and I
- Directed by: Jang Young-woo
- Starring: Jing Boran; Zheng Shuang
- Opening theme: Can't Forget by Jing Boran and Zheng Shuang
- Ending theme: Love Cannot See by Wei Chen
- Country of origin: China
- Original language: Mandarin
- No. of episodes: 24

Production
- Production locations: Hangzhou, Hengdian, Wuzhen
- Production companies: Hunan TV, EE-Media, CJ E&M

Original release
- Network: Hunan TV
- Release: 15 February – 23 March 2015

Related
- Queen and I

Love Weaves Through a Millennium (Chinese: 相爱穿梭千年) is a 2015 Chinese television series starring Jing Boran and Zheng Shuang. It is a remake of the 2012 South Korean television series Queen and I. The series aired on Hunan TV from 15 February to 23 March 2015.

== Synopsis ==
Gong Ming (Jing Boran) is an imperial scholar official and his family's sole survivor after they were massacred in a conspiracy. He is an avid supporter of the reinstatement of Empress Xu, who was deposed due to scheming by royal concubine Zhao Feiyan.

While being persecuted, Gong Ming accidentally time-travels two thousand years to the present with the help of a mysterious jade pendant. There, he meets and falls in love with actress Lin Xiangxiang (Zheng Shuang), who has landed a role as Empress Xu in a historical drama.

For the good of China, Gong Ming insists on going back to the past to save the deposed empress. He finds out he will never be able to return to the present to pursue his love of Xiang Xiang is. Will Gong Ming and his actress love forever be apart, or will they find a way to reunite through the power of love?

== Cast ==
=== Main ===
- Jing Boran as Gong Ming
- Zheng Shuang as Lin Xiangxiang

=== Supporting ===
==== Present ====
- Evonne Hsieh as Jin Jing, Xiang Xiang's manager
- Yang Sen as Xia Yunan, Xiang Xiang's stylist
- Denny Huang as Han Yufei, a famous celebrity and Xiang Xiang's ex-boyfriend
- Nana as Zhao Nana, a famous and arrogant celebrity
- Xie Binbin as Wu Tianxiu, Yu Fei's manager
- Li Gan as Chen Rui, Na Na's manager

==== Past ====
- Chen Xiang as Wang Mang, Gong Ming's good friend who later betrays him. He likes Jing Yue.
- Zhou Yutong as Jing Yue, a female warrior. She likes Gong Ming.
- Peng Ling as Zi Xiu, Wang Mang's confidante; a cold-blooded assassin
- Niki Yi as Zhao Feiyan
- Gao Taiyu as Emperor Cheng
- Tao Hui as Empress Xu
- Zhou Yunshen as Chunyu Zhang

== Production ==
The series is co-produced by Hunan TV and CJ E&M. It is helmed by director Jang Young-woo of I Need Romance 3, producer Kim Young-gyu of Flower Boys Next Door and Nine: Nine Time Travels and the lightning director of My Love From the Star. The music, editing and artistic direction of the series was also done by the Korean production team of Queen and I.

Unlike other typical Chinese television series, Love Weaves Through a Millennium was not pre-produced before its premiere. It was filmed based on a live-shooting format. The script was amended based on audience's responses, including the drama's ending. No dubbing was used; instead, the actors' actual voices were heard in the drama.

Actual Chinese history was adapted into the new script, such as the rivalry between Zhao Feiyan and Empress Xu.

== Soundtrack ==
No.	Title	Singer	Length
1.	"Can't Forget (不能忘)" (Opening theme song)	Jing Boran & Zheng Shuang	04:34
2.	"Love Cannot See (相爱不能见)" (Ending theme song)	Wei Chen	03:36
3.	"One More Day (再多一天)"	Jiang Yingrong	04:34
4.	"Waiting for you like a Fool (等你的时候我像个傻瓜)"	Hong Chen	03:21
5.	"Let Me Love You (让我爱你)"	Huang Ying	03:38

== Ratings ==
Air date	Episode	CSM50 city ratings		
Air date	Episode	Ratings (%)	Audience share (%)	Rank
February 15, 2015	1-2	1.919	4.298	1
February 16, 2015	3-4	1.862	4.106	1
February 22, 2015	5-6	1.655	3.286	1
February 23, 2015	7-8	1.646	3.056	1
March 1, 2015	9-10	1.551	2.924	1
March 2, 2015	11-12	1.414	2.210	1
March 8, 2015	13-14	1.530	2.634	1
March 9, 2015	15-16	1.428	2.379	1
March 15, 2015	17-18	1.416	2.101	1
March 16, 2015	19-20	1.398	2.258	1
March 22, 2015	21-22	1.565	2.908	1
March 23, 2015	Collector's Edition 1-2	1.427	2.743	1
Average ratings		1.567	/	1

- Highest ratings are marked in red, lowest ratings are marked in blue

== See also ==
- Han dynasty
