= Jenny Zhang (actress) =

Chinese actress and singer (born 1987)

Zhang Jiani
- 张嘉倪
- Born: June 22, 1987 (age 39); Chengdu, Sichuan, China
- Other name: Jenny Zhang
- Education: Beijing Film Academy
- Occupations: Actress, singer
- Years active: 2006-present
- Agent(s): Shanghai Chuangyi Cultural Communication Co., Ltd.
- Spouse: Mai Chao (m. 2016)
- Children: 2
- Musical career
- Genres: Mandopop

Chinese name
- Traditional Chinese: 张嘉倪
- Simplified Chinese: 張嘉倪
Transcriptions
Standard Mandarin
- Hanyu Pinyin: Zhāng Jiā'ní

Jenny Zhang (Chinese: 张嘉倪; born 22 June 1987) is a Chinese actress. She rose to fame for her debut role in the television series Dreams Link (2007), adapted from a novel by Chiung Yao. Her other notable works include television series Palace II (2012) and Story of Yanxi Palace (2018).

== Early life and education ==
Zhang was born in Chengdu, Sichuan on June 22, 1987. She graduated from the Beijing Film Academy vocational higher education class (北京电影学院高职班), majoring in performance arts.

== Career ==
In 2006, Zhang won the champion of Looking for Zi Ling (寻找紫菱), a Hunan Television talent show. At that time, Zhang entered into the entertainment industry.

Zhang rose to fame after portraying Wang Ziling in the television series Dreams Link (2007), a romantic television series adaptation based on the novel of the same name by Chiung Yao, and she won the Rising Star Award at the Beijing Television Film and Television Awards. That same year, she made her film debut in The Summer of Our Graduation, playing Xiao Xia.

In 2009, Zhang co-starred with Ming Dao in the television series Smile in My Heart and won the Best Popularity Award at the Entertainment Star List.

Zhang starred as Zhang Xiaorou, reuniting her with co-star Lan Cheng Long, in the 2010 romance series Strands of Love. She also acted in the shenmo television series Ghost Catcher - Legend of Beauty and modern drama From Love.

In 2011, Zhang starred in the historical romance drama Allure Snow, she received positive reviews. She also starred in the period drama Mother's Love, and had a supporting role in the remake of My Fair Princess.

In 2012, Zhang starred in the palace-themed drama Palace II. The same year, she starred in the metropolitan drama City Lover.

In 2013, Zhang starred as Wu Susu in the historical dramaThe Patriot Yue Fei, alongside Huang Xiaoming. She also starred in modern romance drama Flowers of Pinellia Ternata and war drama The Ultimate Conquest.

In 2014, Zhang portrayed the beautiful Sun Shangxiang in the costume web series San Guo Re. The same year, she was cast in the adaptation of Jin Yong's wuxia novel Ode to Gallantry as the female lead Ding Dang.

In 2016, Zhang starred in the modern melodrama Love Me, Don't Go.

In 2017, Zhang starred in the comedy youth film Young & Amazing. The same year, she starred in the war drama The Wolf Warriors.

In 2018, Zhang starred as the second female lead in the romance drama Here to Heart. She then co-starred in the hit palace drama Story of Yanxi Palace, portraying the Noble Lady Shun.

== Personal life ==
On June 22, 2014, Zhang was proposed by her businessman boyfriend, Mai Chao, at her 27th birthday party. The couple married on May 27, 2015. On October 9, 2016, Zhang gave birth to a son in the United States. On August 18, 2018, she announced the birth of her second son on Weibo. In November 2022, Mai was photographed cheating, and Zhang confirmed their marital breakup on Weibo.

== Filmography ==
=== Film ===
Year	English title	Chinese title	Role	Notes
2009	The Summer of Our Graduation	我们毕业的夏天	Xiao Xia	
2011	Blue Tears	幸福速递	A girl	
2017	Young & Amazing	青春逗	Ke Yun	

=== Television series ===
Year	English title	Chinese title	Role	Notes
2007	Dreams Link	又见一帘幽梦	Wang Ziling	
2009	Smile in My Heart	微笑在我心	Xiang Tianwei	
2010	Ghost Catcher - Legend of Beauty	天师钟馗之美丽传说	Lin Xiaodie/ Nie Xiaoqing	
2010	Strands of Love	丝丝心动	Zhang Xiarou	
2010	Mother's Love	母亲心	Weng Shizhen	
2011	New My Fair Princess	新还珠格格	Hu Ruolan	
2012	From Love	离爱	Huo Buding	
2012	Palace II	宫锁珠帘	Genggiya Yushu	
2012	Allure Snow	倾城雪	Jiang Peiyun	
2013	The Patriot Yue Fei	精忠岳飞	Wu Susu	
2013	Flowers of Pinellia Ternata	花开半夏	Cheng Xiuxiu	
2013	The Ultimate Conquest	武间道	Han Meiyu	
2014	San Guo Re	三国热	Sun Shangxiang	
2015	Love Me, Don't Go	爱我，你别走	Jin Jie	
2016	City Lover	城市恋人	Lin Sheshe	
2017	The Wolf Warriors	百战天狼	Zhou Hongshan	
2017	Ode to Gallantry	新侠客行	Ding Dang	
2018	Here to Heart	温暖的弦	Bo Yixin	
2018	Story of Yanxi Palace	延禧攻略	Xojam Chenbi	
2020	Little Doctor	小大夫	Huang Rong	
2021	Ancient Love Poetry	千古玦尘	Wu Huan	

== Discography ==
English title	Chinese title	Notes
Love Song	相思曲	
Crying for you	为你哭	
Sunshine Smile	微笑阳光	
This Feeling Is Love	这感觉就是爱	
Meet Is Fate	相遇的魔咒	

== Awards ==
Year	Award	Category	Nominated work	Notes
2008	Beijing Television Film and Television Awards	Rising Star Award	Dreams Link	
2010	CCTV-MTV Music Awards	Media Recommended Gold Song of the Year	Sunshine Smile	
