= No Limit (2011 film) =

- Directed by: Fu Huayang
- Written by: Sin Ling-yeung; Zhao Yu
- Produced by: Han Zhengning
- Starring: Hans Zhang; Zheng Shuang; Xing Yu; Melrose Hu
- Cinematography: Guo Zhengming; Xiao Weihong
- Edited by: Zhong Weibiao
- Music by: Jian Hei
- Production company: Beijing Antaeus Film
- Release date: 12 August 2011
- Running time: 94 mins
- Language: Mandarin
- Box office: US$0.52m

No Limit (Chinese: 无极限之危情速递) is a youth action comedy film directed by Fu Huayang; starring Hans Zhang, Zheng Shuang, Xing Yu and Melrose Hu. The film was released in China on August 12, 2011.

== Plot ==
Wu Jixian is a cheerful and sunny boy who possesses great racing skills. One day, while delivering an important document for a V.I.P client, he bumps into and disrupts a performance by Xiao An and a group of roller skating youths led by Feng Xingzi. In a bid to show off, Feng Xingzi displays his car racing skills and offends Xiao An. In the midst of this, the baggage in his hands is snatched away by Feng Xingzi. The group of youths does not realise that the baggage contains a genetic sample meant to counter a deadly virus; and a mysterious parrot sent by a crime organization is currently hunting for the baggage. An thrilling adventure and chase thus ensues, as Wu Jixian and his new-found friends seek to recover the baggage and prevent the loss of lives.

== Cast ==
- Hans Zhang as Wu Jixian
- Zheng Shuang as Xiao An
- Xing Yu as Neng Rang
- Melrose Hu as Na Na
- Cao Shuai as Feng Xingzi
- Fu Huayang as Leader of the Black Society
- Jiang Yufei as Killer A
- Tang Jin as Killer B
- Zhou Tongtong as Killer C

== Music ==
- No Limit Love (极限爱恋) by Hans Zhang and Zheng Shuang
