= Meteor Shower (TV series) =

Chinese television series

- Promotional poster
- Genre: Romance comedy Teen
- Based on: Boys Over Flowers by Yoko Kamio
- Directed by: Ding Yangguo; Shen Yi
- Starring: Zheng Shuang; Hans Zhang; Yu Haoming; Vision Wei; Zhu Zixiao
- Opening theme: "Language of Stars" by Hans Zhang, Yu Haoming, Vision Wei and Zhu Zixiao
- Ending theme: "The Freedom I Want" by Xu Fei
- Country of origin: China
- Original language: Mandarin
- No. of episodes: 36 (Season 1); 36 (Season 2)

Production
- Production locations: Xiamen, Shenzhen

Original release
- Network: Hunan TV
- Release: August 8, 2009 – August 30, 2010

Related
- Meteor Garden; Boys Over Flowers 2005; Boys Over Flowers 2009

Meteor Shower (Chinese: 一起来看流星雨; pinyin: Yīqǐ Lái Kàn Liúxīngyǔ) is a 2009 Chinese television series starring Hans Zhang, Yu Haoming, Vision Wei and Zhu Zixiao. It premiered on Hunan Television on August 8, 2009. It is an unlicensed live-television drama production based on Boys Over Flowers not authorized by Japanese publisher Shueisha. According to the producer, the series is only inspired by the manga and not based on it.

== Plot ==
The series follows a poor, yet hard-working and studious girl named Chun Yuxun who dreams of entering Aliston College, a prestigious school in China. She becomes the instant target to a group of four richest students consisting of Murong Yunhai, Duanmu Lei, Shangguan Ruiqian, and Yeshuo – who plan to expel poor students from the college. Through fighting and arguing, Yunhai starts to fall in love with Yuxun but faces numerous rejections. At first, she was in love with Duanmu, but agrees to start seeing him through Yunhai's persistence she agrees to start seeing him.

In the second season, Murong Yunhai wakes up from a dream with a girl, screaming from the pain of his head and furious beating of his heart. Curious about her identity, he begins an argument with his mother and steals her platinum credit card. Yunhai travels to Singapore and meets a girl named Jiang Yuan. He starts falling in love with her, thinking her as the girl appeared in his dreams. Concerned of the situation, Yuxun asks the other members of H4 to stop their relationship and help him reunite with Yuxun.

== Cast ==
=== Main ===
- Zheng Shuang as Chu Yuxun
- Hans Zhang as Murong Yunhai
- Yu Haoming as Duanmu Lei
- Vision Wei as Ye Shuo
- Zhu Zixiao as Shangguan Ruiqian
- Tan Lina as Jiang Yuan

=== Supporting ===
==== Murong family ====
- Wang Jianxin as Murong Zhongshi
- Li Ying as Shen Hanfeng
- Xiao Han as Murong Yunduo

==== Students ====
- Ren Silu as Xu Lili
- Lu Hu as Guo Rongrong
- Yin Yezi as Zhao Meiran
- Chu Yihan as Jin Nana

==== Others ====
- Peng Yang as Yu Xin
- Chen Yina as Xiao Yu
- Xu Yang as Chu Yuxun's mother
- Li Donglin as Cai Xuechun
- Jerry Huang as Ye Mian
- Zong Fengyan as Lin Xiaoli
- Ma Jianqin as Vincy
- Li Shipeng as Jie Jialong
- Cai Juntao as An Yuan

== Soundtrack ==
No.	Title	Singer	Length
1.	"Language of Stars (星空物语)" (Opening theme song)	H4
2.	"The Freedom I Want (我要的飞翔)" (Ending theme song)	Xu Fei
3.	"An Extra Meteor Shower (多余的流星)"	Yico Zeng
4.	"Picking Up Lost Memories (拾忆)"	Hans Zhang
5.	"A Person's Romance (一个人的浪漫)"	Yu Haoming
6.	"Split Lover (分身情人)"	Vision Wei
7.	"Love Waltz (爱的华尔兹)"	Zheng Shuang & Yu Haoming
8.	"Traces of the Rain (雨痕)"	Vision Wei
9.	"Song of Missing (想念的歌)"	Zhu Zixiao
10.	"Let Me Sing a Song for You (让我为你唱首歌)"	H4

== Reception ==
The series attracted various controversies since its premiere. It was criticized for blatant plagiarism of Boys Over Flowers (through its Taiwanese adaptation Meteor Garden), excessive product placement, as well as its old-fashioned costumes and dialogues. Viewers also panned the inconsistent plot and poor characters development of the series. Despite the negative reviews, the series was extremely popular during its run and contributed to the rise of idol dramas in Mainland China.

== Awards ==
Year	Award	Category	Nominated work	Ref.
2010	Baidu Entertainment Ceremony	Most Popular Television Series	Meteor Shower	
2010	16th Shanghai Television Festival	Top 5 Most Popular Television Series	Meteor Shower	
2010	3rd China TV and Internet Ceremony	Top 10 Most Influential Television Series	Meteor Shower	

== Adaptation ==
A 52-episode animated series based on the show was produced, and premiered on Golden Eagle cartoon on February 8, 2016.
