= Ten Deadly Sins =

Novel series by Li Wei Wang

Ten Deadly Sins (十宗罪) is a series of six true crime mystery novels written by Chinese author Li Wei Wang (王黎伟) under the pen name "SPIDER". The books are presented as fictionalized accounts of real criminal cases from China, with names and locations altered. The series centers on a special police unit known as the Spider Special Case Team (or SIG - Special Investigation Group) that investigates highly abnormal and grotesque homicides.

The novels gained significant popularity online, and in print. They were adapted into a 2016 Chinese suspense drama web-series with the same name that aired on Youku and reportedly exceeded 1 billion views.

== 2016 web series adaptation ==
A 21-episode web-series titled Ten Deadly Sins (十宗罪) premiered on Youku on 27 July 2016. It was co-produced by Youku Tudou and partners including Baimeng Film. Korean director Lee Dong-hoon (李东勋) directed, with Eric Tsang (曾志伟) serving as supervisor. Screenwriters included Yang Zhe and Xu Xiangyun.

Zhang Han (张翰) as Hua Long, a member of the SSIU he possesses high intelligence and expectational skills, he is meticulous, dislikes to follow rules, and enjoys investigating cases from the killer's perspective.

Eric Tsang (曾志伟) as Professor Liang (Liang Shuye), the leader of the SSIU, she is highly experienced and keen in observing human behavior and psychology, known in the police force as a "human lie detector."

Yu Xiaotong (于小彤) as Bao Zhan, a member of the SSIU he possesses extensive knowledge and a calm mind.

Zhang Yamei (张雅玫) as Su Mei, a member of the SSIU she is a IT technology expert.

== Legacy ==
The novel inspired the manga series villainous group known as The Deadly Ten or the Ten Deadly Sins, based off the same name as the novels. The Deadly Ten are inspired by both the Ten Commandments and the seven deadly sins from Christian theology. The members are Immortal, Illusion, King, Void, Lure, Acid, Blitz, Ice, Rage and Glitch. They were upgraded through a brutal experiment made by Darkness, called the Experimental Draft. Were Darkness put them through experiments against their will; only these ten survived and became the Deadly 10, they are all bounded by soul contracts forced upon them by Darkness. The sins they represent are pride (Immortal), wrath (Rage), gluttony (King), greed (Blitz), envy (Acid), lust (Lure), sloth (Illusion), lying (Void), despair (Ice), and vainglory (Glitch). The commandments they represent are "You shall have no other gods before me" (Immortal), "You shall not kill" (Rage), "You shall not covet" (Acid), "You shall not commit adultery" (Lure), "You shall not make any graven images" (Glitch), "You shall not steal" (Blitz), "Honor your father and mother" (Illusion), "You shall not take the Lord's name in vain" (King), "Remember the Sabbath day" (Ice), and "You shall not lie" (Void).
