= Vision Wei =

Chinese pop singer and actor

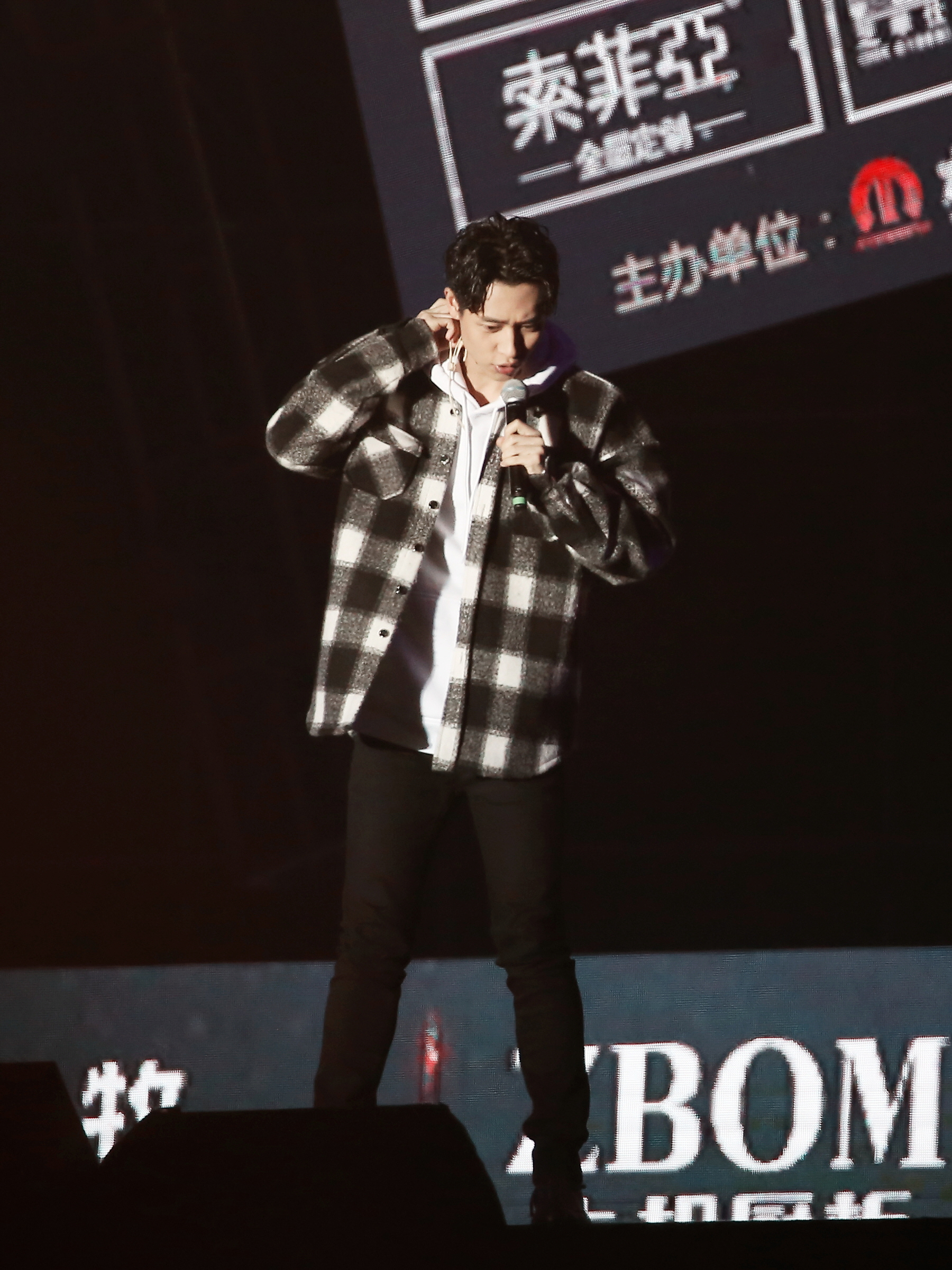
- Wei in 2017
- Born: Wèi Chén (pinyin) 魏晨; 22 February 1986 (age 40); Lanzhou, Gansu, China
- Education: Sichuan Conservatory of Music
- Occupations: Singer; actor
- Agent: Huayi Brothers
- Spouse: Yu Wei (m. 2020)
- Children: 1
- Musical career
- Genres: Mandopop

Wei Chen (Chinese: 魏晨; pinyin: Wèi Chén) (born February 22, 1986) is a Chinese pop singer and actor, who rose to fame through televised singing competition Super Boy. He is probably best known through his album Disparate and his role as Ye Shuo in television series Meteor Shower.

== Early life ==
Wei was born on February 22, 1986. He grew up in Lanzhou, Gansu. In high school, he started having vocal music and piano lessons and later attended the Sichuan Conservatory of Music. As a professional musician, he is also accomplished at piano, guitar, hulusi, guxun.

Wei participated in the 2007 season of Super Boy, a famous national televised singing competition in China, and placed third. In the competition, Wei's contagious performances and sunny image had won him much attention.

== Career ==
In 2007, after Super Boy, Wei released his first extended play Optimist and held his first solo concert.

In 2008, Wei made his acting debut in the film Seventeen, starring Joan Chen and Sam Chow. The same year, he starred in the musical Struggle, based on the popular youth drama of the same name.

In 2009, he starred in the television series Meteor Shower as one of the leads. The drama was a commercial success and launched Wei to fame. The same year, he starred in the musical film China Idol Boys.

In 2010, Wei released his first full album Disparate. The album was met with commercial success, reaching number 1 on numerous Chinese music charts. He reprised his role in the sequel of Meteor Shower, which was met with success.

In 2011, Wei began hosting the variety show Great Sunday. In August, Wei collaborated with Lee Joon and Thunder of MBLAQ on the single "Run Away", and performed on the Korean music program M! Countdown. His third album, Daybreak was released on October 10.

In 2012, Wei held his second solo concert, My Way in Beijing. His fourth album V Space was released on October 15, 2012. His fifth album, Pinnacle was released on August 21, 2013. His title song "Cover the Lover" featured Hannah Quinlivan as the lead actress.

In 2014, Wei co-starred in the youth film Fleet of Time. His sixth album Hat Trick was released on December 12 with him acting as the executive producer of the album.

In 2015, Wei established his personal studio. His seventh album Day Dreamer was released on December 21. He then held the eponymous titled concert tour which wrapped up in Beijing on October.

In 2016, Wei co-starred in the crime thriller Lost in White as an important character. His eighth album Journey was released on December 25 to mark his tenth anniversary since debut. The same year he was cast in the war film A Fangirl's Romance as a general.

In 2017, Wei joined the cast of drama film Midnight Diners. In September, Wei embarked on his Journey arena concert to mark his tenth anniversary.

In 2018, Wei focused on acting. He first joined the cast of the war film The Eight Hundred directed by Guan Hu, and was cast in the military television series Anti-Terrorism Special Forces III.

== Personal life ==
In 2020, he announced his marriage with Yu Wei.

== Filmography ==
=== Film ===
Year	English title	Chinese title	Role	Notes/Ref.
2008	Seventeen	十七	Tian Yi	
2009	Fire Boy	乐火男孩	Ou Xiaolang	
2014	Fleet of Time	匆匆那年	Qiao Rang	
2016	Lost in White	冰河追凶	Li YongSheng	
2019	Midnight Diner	深夜食堂	Tang Song	
2019	My People, My Country	我和我的祖国	Captain Chen	
2020	The Eight Hundred	八佰	Zhu Jinzhong	
2020	Three Old Boys	三叉戟		
2020	The Sacrifice	金刚川	Yan Rui	
2023	The Volunteers: To the War	志愿军：雄兵出击	Dai Ruyi	
TBA	A Fangirl's Romance	迷妹罗曼史	Ye Weijun	

=== Television series ===
Year	English title	Chinese title	Role	Notes/Ref.
2009	Meteor Shower	一起来看流星雨	Ye Shuo	
2010	Meteor Shower 2	一起又看流星雨	Ye Shuo	
2013	The Sweet Burden	小儿难养	Himself	Cameo
2019	Anti-Terrorism Special Forces III	反恐特战队之天狼	Tang Shi	
2020	Mystery of Antiques 2	古董局中局2	Yao Buran	

=== Stage ===
- Struggle, 2008–2009

== Discography ==
=== Albums ===
Year	English title	Chinese title	Notes
2008	Optimist	乐天派	
2010	Disparate	千方百计	
2011	Daybreak	破晓	
2012	V SPACE	—N/a	
2013	Pinnacle	登“封”造极	
2014	Hat Trick	帽子戏法	
2015	Day Dreamer	白日梦想家	
2016	Journey	旅程	

=== Singles ===
Year	English title	Chinese title	Album	Notes
2007	Juvenile Tour	少年游	13	
2008	Jiayou! You Have Me!	加油！你有ME！	Xin De Dong Fang	with Alan Dawa Dolma
2008	Happiness of Having You	有你的幸福	Classic Love Song Duet Lover	Promotional song of Struggle
2008	Mad Man's Wish	疯人愿	Disparate	Theme song of Struggle
2009	Velvet Flowers	绒花	Hongxing Shanshan	
2009	Split Lover	分身情人	Meteor Shower OST	
2009	Traces of the Rain	雨痕	Meteor Shower OST	
2009	Language of Stars	星空物语	Meteor Shower OST	as part of H4
2009	Let Me Sing a Song for You	让我为你唱首歌	Meteor Shower OST	as part of H4
2010	Blooming of Dreams	梦的怒放	—N/a	Theme song of Super Boy 2010 with Lu Hu
2011	Great Sunday	给力星期天	—N/a	Theme song of Great Sunday with Hans Zhang and Zhu Zixiao
2011	Curse of Love	恋爱咒语	Magic to Win OST	with Hong Chen
2012	Love is only Complete with You	爱,有你才完整	Fairytale OST	
2012	Love x Love	爱×爱	—N/a	Theme song of Music Radio Charity Event
2013	I Endorse Myself	我为自己代言	—N/a	Advertisement theme song for Jumei
2013	Warm Snow	热雪	Tiny Times OST	
2013	Mr Top	—N/a	—N/a	Theme song of Music Radio with DJ小强
2014	Good night my love	—N/a	—N/a	Advertisement theme song for 奶特公司
2014	The Year Where Flowers Bloom	花开那年	Hat Trick	
2014	Your Own Sunshine	自己的太阳	—N/a	Theme song of Music Radio Charity Event
2015	Love Cannot See	相爱不能见	Love Weaves Through a Millennium OST	
2015	Lovers & Movies	爱我就陪我看电影	Lovers & Movies OST	
2015	Fracture	破绽	Lost in White OST	
2016	Blazing Combat	烈火神盾	Hot Girl OST	
2016	Date! Super Star	約吧！大明星	—N/a	Theme song for Date! Super Star
2017	Half a Centimeter	半厘米	—N/a	with Lokey
2017	You are the stars of the sea	星辰大海是你	The Starry Night, The Starry Sea II OST	
2018	Asia Tsunami	亚洲雄风	—N/a	
2018	Worldly Affairs	红尘	Ever Night OST	
