= The Four (2015 TV series) =

2015 Chinese television series

- 少年四大名捕
- Genre: Wuxia; Romance; Mystery
- Based on: Si Da Ming Bu by Woon Swee Oan
- Screenplay by: Yang Linyan; Wang Zhang; Zheng Youqing
- Directed by: Liang Shengquan; Huang Junwen
- Starring: Hans Zhang; Yang Yang; William Chan; Mao Zijun
- Opening theme: "Hero in the Wind" by Hans Zhang
- Ending theme: "Defying Missing You" by Mickey He
- Country of origin: China
- Original language: Mandarin
- No. of episodes: 48

Production
- Producers: Zhao Zhicheng; Tan Xinguo
- Production location: Hengdian World Studios
- Running time: ≈45 minutes per episode
- Production companies: H&R Century Pictures; Enlight Media

Original release
- Network: Hunan TV
- Release: March 17 – June 23, 2015

The Four (少年四大名捕) is a 2015 Chinese wuxia television series adapted from the novel Si Da Ming Bu (四大名捕; The Four Great Constables) by Woon Swee Oan. It starred Hans Zhang, Yang Yang, William Chan and Mao Zijun, and was first aired on Hunan TV from 17 March to 23 June 2015.

== Synopsis ==
During the Ming dynasty, there are four detectives – Lengxue, Wuqing, Zhuiming and Tieshou – known for their fighting prowess and keen insight in solving challenging murder mysteries. Lengxue saves Chu Limo, who is on the run from the imperial palace. Zhuge Zhengwo finds out that Chu Limo is Xia Hongyao's daughter, and takes her under his care. Lengxue and Chu Limo initially do not get along, but their relationship gradually takes a meaningful turn through difficult times. An Shigeng wants to get rid of the four detectives, who have exposed his numerous crimes and evil deeds. He uses Yao Jihua's jealousy of Lengxue and Chu Limo's relationship to harm them. Together, the four detectives work together to bring down An Shigeng. At the same time, they each find their own happiness.

== Cast ==
=== Main (The Four Constables) ===
- Hans Zhang as Lengxue

Prince of the Wolf tribe, and a skilled swordsman. He is cold and silent due to his turmoils and painful past. He initially had a rocky relationship with Chu Limo, but later fell in love with her.

- Yang Yang as Wuqing

A calm, gentle and otherworldly gentleman. He specializes in using the fan and other hidden weapons. He gets into various romance entanglements with Nangong Ruyin, Chu Limo and Mu Xue, but wasn't able to achieve happiness.

- William Chan as Zhuiming

An optimistic, cheerful and loyal man. He is an expert in qinggong, and loves to drink wine. He loves Princess Ziluo.

- Mao Zijun as Tieshou

A boxer who uses his iron fists as weapon. He possesses a royal demeanor and is also very helpful, constantly standing up against injustice. He loves Ling Yiyi.

=== Supporting ===
- Janine Chang as Chu Limo / Chu Yingxue

Xia Hongyao's daughter. She possesses a talented gift for reading people's minds. While escaping from the imperial's palace's beauty draft, she was saved by Lengxue and becomes a maid at Shenhou Mansion.

- Mickey He as An Shidi

The main antagonist, responsible for all the evil deeds; including the murder of Lengxue's family. He wants to become the Emperor to seek revenge for his lover, Diewu. He uses the Soul Pill to control the four villains, Wen Ruyu and Wen Wuchang, and manipulates them to achieve his goals.

- Emma Wu as Ling Yiyi

A simple-minded and loyal girl, who can do anything for the man she loves. She is used by enemies and her body becomes poisonous.

- Jia Qing as Ji Yaohua

Fierce and stubborn, her father’s official rank makes it easier for her to become a leading female guard. Being in love and betrothed to Lengxue, his blooming love with Limo leaves her susceptible to An Shidi's schemes.

- Huang Wenhao as Zhuge Zhengwo

The teacher of Lengxue, Wuqing, Zhuiming and Tieshou. He discovers Chu Limo and taught her the art of reading minds, passed down from Xia Hongyao.

- Hao Zejia as Nunu

Lengxue's childhood friend and foster sister. A descendant of the wolf tribe.

- Meng Yixuan as Nangong Ruyan

Wuqing's love interest. She was later forced to become An Shidi's wife due to her resemblance with Diewu.

- Wang Shuang as Muxue

Princess of Qingge Tribe. She admires Wuqing.

- Jiang Yuchen as Princess Ziluo

The Imperial Princess. Unruly and capricious; she initially fell in love with Lengxue, but later develops a relationship with Zhuiming.

=== Extended ===
- Yang Mingna as Jiao Yang (Zhuge Zhengwo's love interest, Mingyuelou's lady boss)
- Chen Yun as Ye'er (Limo's good friend, a servant at Shenhou Mansion)
- Wang Haiyang as Yu Chuntong (Leader of Liushanmen, An Shidi's confidante)
- Liu Xin as Liu Chunping (Shenhou Mansion's head servant. She likes Lengxue and Wuqing)
- Zhou Shaodong as Prince Xiang
- Qian Yongchen as Yan Zhao (One of the four villains)
- Zhou Muyin as Tang Chou (One of the four villains)
- Ma Wenlong as Shu Wan (One of the four villains)
- Cheng Cheng as Zhao Hao (One of the four villains)
- Li Tengjing as Wen Ruyu (The synonym of death. He often concocts poison to harm people)
- Ma Kui as Wen Wuchang (Wen Ruyu's son)
- Ying Haoming as Mo Erchi (Crown Prince of a tribe. He likes Limo)
- Liu Sitong as Xia Hongyao (Limo's mother, a nun at Shengyue Sect who specializes in reading people's minds. She previously had a relationship with Lengxue's father)
- Qiu Yueli as Chu Yanliang (Limo's father)
- Meng Yixuan as Diewu (An Shidi's love interest)

=== Special appearances ===
- He Jiayi as Aqina (leader of Shengyue Sect)
- Michelle Bai as Nine-tailed Fox
- Han Dong as Zhang Sheng (Nine-tailed Fox's husband)
- Liu Changde as Zhao Jinlong
- Zhang Meng as Huilan (Zhao Jinlong's wife)
- Zheng Shuang as Wen Bing'er (Wen Ruyi's niece, a disabled physician)
- Huang Ming as Master Du (A man in love with Ziluo, but was used by her as a pawn to make Zhuiming jealous)
- Zong Fengyan as Master Wuhen (A playboy and womanizer)

== Soundtrack ==
No.	Title	Lyrics	Music	Singer	Length
1.	"Hero in the Wind (风中英雄)" (Opening theme song)	Wu Muchan	Tan Xuan	Hans Zhang
2.	"Defying Missing You (逆相思)" (Ending theme song)	He Hua	Tan Xuan	Mickey He
3.	"Waiting Silently (无言守候)"	Cui Shu	Luo Liwei	William Chan
4.	"Giving Up (放下)"	Ding Dingzhang	Chen Song	Hu Xia

== Reception ==
The drama is a commercial success. It maintained the number one spot in its timeslot during broadcast, with an average viewership rating of 0.729% (CSM50) and 0.82% (nationwide). The series was especially popular with the younger audiences due to its main cast of flower boys.

=== Ratings ===
Premiere ratings in Diamond Theater
Air date	Episode	Unit name	CSM50 city network ratings			National Internet ratings		
Air date	Episode	Unit name	Ratings	Audience share	Rank	Ratings	Audience share	Rank
March 17, 2015	1-2	Xiu Nu flees	0.838	5.013	1	0.89	6.90	1
March 18, 2015	3-4	Xiu Nu flees	0.676	4.145	1	0.78	6.41	1
March 24, 2015	5-6	Streptocarpus reproduction	0.580	3.760	1	0.69	5.98	1
March 25, 2015	7-8	Streptocarpus reproduction	0.720	4.601	1	0.73	6.22	1
March 31, 2015	9-10	Mindfulness	0.772	4.666	1	0.83	6.65	1
April 1, 2015	11-12	Mindfulness	0.796	4.636	1	0.90	7.01	1
April 7, 2015	13-14	Shadowless illusion	0.611	3.816	1	0.88	7.12	1
April 8, 2015	15-16	Shadowless illusion	0.545	3.48	1	0.83	7.07	1
April 14, 2015	17-18	Love at the bottom of the cliff	0.813	5.088	1	0.97	8.18	1
April 15, 2015	19-20	Love at the bottom of the cliff	0.868	5.58	1	1.03	8.82	1
April 21, 2015	21-22	Meet indefinitely	0.819	5.526	1	1.01	9.05	1
April 22, 2015	23-24	Meet indefinitely	0.914	5.851	1	0.98	8.73	1
April 28, 2015	25-26	Love Poison	0.818	5.058	1	0.78	6.46	1
April 29, 2015	27-28	Love Poison	0.817	4.69	1	-	-	-
May 5, 2015	29-30	What is love	0.710	4.279	1	0.76	6.15	1
May 6, 2015	31-32	What is love	0.716	4.376	1	-	-	-
May 12, 2015	33-34	Invisible hand	0.687	4.218	1	0.69	5.53	1
May 13, 2015	35-36	Invisible hand	0.736	4.339	1	0.66	5.18	1
May 19, 2015	37-38	Difficult book	0.613	3.687	1	0.63	4.97	1
May 20, 2015	39-40	Difficult book	0.640	4.099	1	-	-	-
May 26, 2015	41-42	Love-hate dilemma	0.59	3.779	1	0.77	6.24	1
May 27, 2015	43-44	Love-hate dilemma	0.55	3.74	1	0.75	6.67	1
June 2, 2015	45-46	Battle demon	0.863	5.325	1	-	-	-
June 3, 2015	47-48	Battle demon	0.806	5.057	1	1.05	8.40	1
Average ratings			0.729	4.534	1	0.82	6.83	1

- Highest ratings are marked in red, lowest ratings are marked in blue

== Broadcast ==
Channel	Location	Broadcast start date	Note
Hunan TV	Mainland China	March 17, 2015	Tuesday, Wednesday 22:00 - 24:00 (two eps)
Chunghwa TV	Korea	June 22, 2015	Monday to Friday 22:00 (two eps)
Astro HD	Malaysia	July 12, 2015	Every Sunday 13:00 (five eps), Monday to Friday 18:00 (replay)
CTV Taiwan	Taiwan	October 5, 2015	Monday to Friday 20:00
Zhongtian Entertainment	Taiwan	October 5, 2015	Monday to Friday 22:00
Channel 7	Thailand	May 8, 2017	Monday - Thursday at 2:10 pm
JakTV	Indonesia	May 27, 2017	Aired with title of "The Four Detectives". Saturday to Sunday at 20:30.
NECO	Japan	July 21, 2017	Every Friday at 19: 00
