= The Queen of SOP =

- Genre: Romantic comedy
- Directed by: Zhang Boyu
- Starring: Joe Chen; Hans Zhang; Godfrey Gao
- Opening theme: I Like Loneliness by Joe Chen
- Ending theme: Your Beloved Friend by Hans Zhang
- Countries of origin: China; Taiwan
- Original language: Mandarin
- No. of series: 1
- No. of episodes: 33

Production
- Production locations: Taiwan, London, Shanghai
- Running time: 90/105 minutes

Original release
- Network: Hunan Television; FTV; GTV
- Release: 14 October 2012

The Queen of SOP (Chinese: 胜女的代价) is a 2012 Chinese-Taiwanese television series produced by GTV and directed by Zhang Boyu. It stars Joe Chen, Hans Zhang and Godfrey Gao. The show first premiered on Hunan TV on 14 October 2012 before airing on FTV. The series was the highest rated drama in its time slot for the year, and also received positive reviews from the audience.

== Synopsis ==
Lin Xiao Jie (Joe Chen) is a low rung employee at a large Taiwanese departmental store. Dreaming of furthering her studies in England so that she can rise up the ranks in her company, Xiao Jie jumps at the opportunity to be an assistant at a company photo shoot in London. On her final day there, she gets mugged and flags down Tang Jun (Hans Zhang) for help, who successfully catches the thief and returns her belongings.

After flying back to Taiwan, Xiao Jie decides to take a leap of faith and study abroad. She sees an apartment listing online that she immediately takes a liking to, and messages the owner, 'Tom', who happens to be Tang Jun. 'Tom' agrees to rent the apartment out to her, and makes preparations for her arrival. Xiao Jie and 'Tom' begin an online friendship, with Xiao Jie seeking Tom's advice. Eventually, Tang Jun begins to fall for Xiao Jie.

However, before Xiao Jie makes her final plans to leave, she is offered a better position at the company by the CEO, and decides not to leave for London. Tang Jun, upon hearing the news, is disappointed. Shortly after, Tang Jun is arm-twisted to go to Taiwan by his mother, who wants his help in a business deal. Although he is reluctant, Tang Jun agrees, but becomes enthusiastic when he realizes that Xiao Jie works for the company his mother is engaging in a deal with. However, upon arriving in Taiwan, Tang Jun finds out that Xiao Jie has started a relationship with the son of her company's CEO, Gao Zi Qi (Godfrey Gao), after he expressed interest in her at a press conference.

Xiao Jie and Zi Qi gets engaged eventually, but the day before the wedding, Zi Qi's ex-girlfriend and supermodel Bai Ji Qing (Coco Jiang) shows up and reveals that she is the one Zi Qi really loves. The heartbroken Xiao Jie leaves and decides to focus on her career. Under the support and encouragement of 'Tom', Xiao Jie becomes a successful businesswoman. Unbeknownst to her, Tang Jun is really her online friend 'Tom' and the heir to a supermarket chain. Not wishing to give up on a chance at love with Xiao Jie, he hides his identity to pursue her. But the road to this is paved with misunderstandings and missed chances.

== Cast ==
=== Main ===
Actor	Character	Introduction	Appearance
Joe Chen	Lin Xiao Jie (林曉潔); The Queen of Gold	I'm Lin Xiao Jie... Rule of The Queen of SOP. Are you willing to comply with? 29 years old, Scorpio, Hai Yue's Sales Division, Marketing Public Relations Staff, and later Huang Hai's Marketing Planning Manager.	All episodes
Hans Zhang	Tang Jun / Tom (湯駿)	I'm Tang Jun... Please let me love you now! 27 years old, Virgo, the heir of Huang Hai Group.	All episodes
Godfrey Gao	Gao Zi Qi (高子齊)	I'm Gao Zi Qi... I said, I want you to come back!! 30 years old, Scorpio, second son of Hai Yue Group, in charge of Supermarket Chains.	1-9, 11-15
Coco Jiang (蒋怡)	Bai Ji Qing (白季晴); The Queen of Calculation	I'm Bai Ji Qing... Please remember, I will never compromise 28 years old, Aries, popular female star.	1-8,11,12
Zhang Meng	Zeng Chu Chu (曾楚楚); The Queen of Love	I'm Zeng Chu Chu... I won't give up! 26 years old, Pisces, PR Manager of Huang Hai Group, Tang Jun's childhood friend.	5-15
Bai Xue (白雪)	Tang Lan 湯蘭	CEO of Huang Hai, Tang Jun's mother, Tang Min's step mother.	2-8,10-12,14-15
Du Ruo Xi (杜若溪)	Tang Min 湯敏; The Queen of Imperial	30 years old, Leo. Huang Hai's Marketing Director of Planning Department. Tang Jun's half sister.	5,6,8-15

=== Supporting ===
Actor	Character	Introduction	Appearance
Kimi Hsia	Li Jia Yi (李佳宜)	Hai Yue's sales staff. Lin Xiao Jie's best friend.	1-5,7-10,12-13
Lu Wen Xue (魯文學)	Gao Guo Cheng (高國誠)	CEO of Hai Yue. Father of Gao Zi Hao & Gao Zi Qi.	1-5,7,11-12
Gino	Gao Zi Hao (高子豪)	General Manager of Hai Yue, Gao Zi Qi's half brother.	1-5,7,11-12
Anthony	Tian Tian (天天)	Gao Zi Qi's assistant.	1-5,8,9,11
Han Dao Guang (韓道光)	Director Qiao (喬總監)	Hai Yue's Director of Marketing Communications.	1-3,5,7,11-12
Nie Ya Liang (聶雅亮)	Zeng Dong (曾董)	Director of Huang Hai. Zeng Chu Chu's father.	6,8-15
Joker Xue	Xue Shao Qian (薛少謙)	Staff of Huang Hai's Marketing Planning Department.	8-11
Tang Yixin	Su Li (蘇莉)	Staff of Huang Hai's Marketing Planning Department.	6,8-11,13-15
Zhou Zi Yin (周子茵)	Zhou Su Su (周素素)	Staff of Huang Hai's Marketing Planning Department.	6,8-15
Zheng Fan (鄭凡)	Zheng Fan (鄭凡)	Staff of Huang Hai's Marketing Planning Department.	6,8-11,13-15
Huang Wei Ting (黃薇渟)	Ai Lin (愛琳)	Staff of Hai Yue's Marketing Communications.	1-4,11,12
Cai Shun Jie (蔡順傑)	Paul (保羅)	Staff of Hai Yue's Marketing Communications.	1-4,11,12
Han Ke Qi (韓可棋)	Sarah (莎拉)	Staff of Hai Yue's Marketing Communications.	1-4,11,12
Chen Zhi Hao (陳志豪)	Daniel (丹尼爾)	Staff of Hai Yue's Marketing Communications.	1-4,11,12
Mei Xian Zhi (梅賢志)	Joy (喬治)	Staff of Hai Yue's Marketing Communications.	1-4,11,12
Lu Xin Yan (呂欣晏)	Anna (安娜)	Staff of Hai Yue's Marketing Communications.	1-4,11,12
Kitamura Toyoharu (北村豐晴)	Xiao Ma (小馬)	Li Jia Yi's boyfriend.	3-5,7
Deng Jiu Yun (鄧九雲)	Amy (愛咪)	Bai Ji Qing's manager.	2-4,8
Zhou Xiao Hai (周曉海)	Zhou Wen (周文)	Housekeeper of Tang Family.	5,8,11,13-15

=== Special appearance ===
Actor	Character	Introduction	Appearance
Ming Dao	Adam Bell (亞當貝爾)	I'm Adam Bell... You... don't fall for me easily 30 years old, Sagittarius, Tang Jun's best friend	1,2,7,8,12

== Soundtrack ==
-	Title	Singer	Lyrics	Composer
Opening theme song	I Like Loneliness (喜歡孤獨)	Joe Chen	Joe Chen	Jeremy Ji (紀佳松)
Ending theme song	Your Beloved Friend (最愛你的朋友)	Hans Zhang	A Tong Mu (阿童木)	Jin Da Zhou (金大洲)
Insert song	Goldfish's Tears (金魚的眼淚)	Jeremy Ji (紀佳松)	Li Nian He (李念和)	Jeremy Ji (紀佳松)
Insert song	Last Page (最後一頁)	Jessie Chiang (江語晨)	Song Jian Zhang (宋健彰)	Zhan Yu Hao (詹宇豪)
Insert song	A Few of You (幾個你)	Joker Xue (薛之謙)	Joker Xue (薛之謙)	Joker Xue (薛之謙)
Insert song	I Know You Know (我知道你都知道)	Joker Xue (薛之謙)	Luan Shi (亂世)	Joker Xue (薛之謙)

== International broadcast ==
Country	Channel	Timeslot	Episode premiere	Episode finale	Avg rating
Taiwan	FTV	Sunday 22:00	14 October 2012	-	-
Taiwan	GTV	Saturday 21:00	20 October 2012	-	-
Singapore	Channel U	Saturday 21:30	13 October 2012	-	-
China	Hunnan TV	Sunday - Wednesday 19:30	15 July 2012	-	-
United States	ICN China	Monday - Friday 20:00	29 August 2012	-	-
