= Connor Leong =

Chinese actor and model

Leon Leong
- Born: 4 January 1994 (age 32); Zhanjiang, Guangdong Province, China
- Other names: Liang Jingkang; Leong Jing-hong; Connor Leong
- Education: Guangzhou University
- Occupations: Actor; model
- Years active: 2017–present
- Agent: Feibao Media

Chinese name
- Traditional Chinese: 梁靖康
- Simplified Chinese: 梁靖康
Transcriptions
Standard Mandarin
- Hanyu Pinyin: Liáng Jìngkāng

Liang Jingkang (Chinese: 梁靖康; pinyin: Liáng Jìngkāng; born 4 January 1994), also known as Leon Leong, formerly Connor Leong, is a Chinese actor and model. He is best known for his role as Feng Meizuo in the television series Meteor Garden (2018), which propelled him to fame in China and Asia.

== Early life and education ==
Leong was born on 4 January 1994 in Shenzhen, Guangdong province of China. He attended South China Institute of Software Engineering in Guangzhou University. In college, he began modelling and filming advertisements.

== Career ==
=== 2016–2017: Beginnings ===
In 2016, Leong debuted as an actor in the historical comedy series Huang Fei Hong where he played the role as Gong Ting. He then starred in the short film Night Poet. The same year, Leong was cast as a customer in the Chinese film adaptation of Midnight Diner directed by Tony Leung Ka-fai.

In 2017, Leong starred in the fantasy romance film Cat Lover. Leong also participated in the Youku variety show Super Idol, hosted by He Jiong. The same year, he was cast by Angie Chai in the role of Feng Meizuo in the 2018 adaptation of Meteor Garden Leong appeared in Harper's Bazaar China with his Meteor Garden costars Dylan Wang, Darren Chen, and Caesar Wu in the November issue.

=== 2018–present: Rising popularity ===
Leong rose to fame with his role as Feng Meizuo in the 2018 television series Meteor Garden, the remake of popular Taiwanese drama series Meteor Garden and based on the Japanese shōjo manga series Boys Over Flowers (花より男子, Hana Yori Dango) written by Yoko Kamio.

In 2019, Leong starred in Another Me, a television drama based on the film Soul Mate (2016). He plays a guest role as the younger brother of the female lead. The same year, he played the male lead in the youth sports drama Never Stand Still.

In 2020, Leong starred in the youth romance drama My Love, Enlighten Me. He is set to star in the youth comedy drama Run For Young. In November 2020, he was cast as the main lead of the upcoming C-drama, A Robot In the Orange Orchard, alongside Sun Qian.

== Filmography ==
=== Film ===
Year	English title	Chinese title	Role	Notes	Ref.
2016	Night Poet	夜的诗人	Ye Yi	Short film	
2017	Cat Lover	猫妖传奇	Jiang Zhe		
2019	Midnight Diner	深夜食堂	Qiu Fan	Support role	
2021	Sister	我的姐姐	Zhao Ming	Support role	
2021	My Love	你的婚礼	Chen Hao'er	Guest role	
2021	The Day We Lit Up the Sky	燃野少年的天空	Classmate C	Support role	
2024	Burning Stars	孤星计划	Xu Tianping	Main role	
2026	Now I Met Her	我的妈耶	High School Senior	Guest role	
TBA	Love Me, Love My Supersize	艺芝两百磅	Nai Ma	Main role	
TBA	Zai Ta Shen Hou	在她身后		Main role	

=== Television series ===
Year	English title	Chinese title	Role	Network	Notes	Ref.
2017	Huang Fei Hong	国士无双黄飞鸿	Gong Ting	Tencent Video	Support role	
2018	Meteor Garden	流星花园	Feng Meizuo	Hunan TV	Main role	
2019	Another Me	七月与安生	Jiu Yue	iQIYI	Main role	
2019	Project 17: Side By Side	极限17: 羽你同行	Ping An	Tencent Video, Mango TV	Main role	
2020	My Love, Enlighten Me	暖暖请多指教	Han Che	Tencent Video	Main role	
2020	Run For Young	风犬少年的天空	Ma Tian	Bilibili	Main role	
2021	Be Yourself	机智的上半场	Fan Qingzhou	Youku	Support role	
2021	Definitely Not Today	今天不是最后一天定	Mi Chong	Tencent Video, Youku	Main role	
2022	A Robot In The Orange Orchard	你好呀，我的橘子恋人	Lu Sen	Youku	Main role	
2022	The Stories of Lion Rock Spirit	狮子山下的故事	Xie Langfeng	Tencent Video, CCTV	Support role	
2022	Song Of Life	三悦有了新工作	Luo Damiao	Bilibili	Main role	
2023	Da Shi Jie Niu Dan Ji 2	大世界扭蛋机 第二季		Bilibili	Main role	
2024	Po Mi	破密	Cai Zehong/Cai Wei	CCTV	Main role	
2025	The Company	哑舍	Su Beilu/Qin Ziyi	Tencent Video	Main role	
2026	Love for You	野狗骨头	Cen Ye	Hunan TV, Mango TV	Support role	
TBA	Love Song in Summer	明川有知夏	Song Qiyuan	iQIYI	Support role	
TBA	Call for the Truth	未完待续	Qin Tian	iQIYI	Main role	
TBA	Love Under the Floral Rain	半城花雨伴君离	Feng Junli	Youku	Main role	

=== Variety Shows ===
Year	English title	Chinese title	Role
2018, 2019, 2020, 2021	Happy Camp	快乐大本营	Guest
2017	Beat The Champions: Season 2	来吧冠军2	Cast Member
2017	Super Idol	超次元偶像	Contestant
2018	Day Day Up	天天向上	Guest with F4 & Shen Yue
2018	Phanta City	幻乐之城	Guest with F4 & Shen Yue
2021	Back To Field: Season 5	向往的生活5	Guest
2021	Teens Party in Summer	夏日少年派	Cast Member
2022	Quan Li Yi Fu De Xing Dong Pai	全力以赴的行动派	Guest
TBA	Field of Hope	希望的田野	Cast Member

== Discography ==
=== Soundtrack appearances ===
Year	English title	Chinese title	Album	Notes
2018	"For You"	—N/a	Meteor Garden OST	with Dylan Wang, Darren Chen, and Caesar Wu
2018	"Creating Memories"	创造回忆	Meteor Garden OST	with Dylan Wang, Darren Chen, and Caesar Wu
2018	"Never Would’ve Thought Of"	从来没想到	Meteor Garden OST	with Dylan Wang, Darren Chen, and Caesar Wu
2018	"Star Counting Shooting Stars"	星星数流星	Meteor Garden OST	

== Awards and nominations ==
Year	Award	Category	Nominated work	Result	Ref.
2019	Golden Bud - The Fourth Network Film And Television Festival	Best Actor	Project 17: Side By Side	Nominated	
2019	Sina Fashion Awards	Fashion Artist of the Year	—N/a	Won	
