= Qiyue and Ansheng =

Qiyue and Ansheng may refer to:

- Another Me (TV series), Chinese television series
- Soul Mate (2016 film), Chinese romantic drama film
