= The Chang'an Youth =

Chinese television program

- Also known as: The Chang An Youth
- Traditional Chinese: 長安少年行
- Simplified Chinese: 长安少年行
- Hanyu Pinyin: Cháng'ān Shàonián Xíng
- Genre: Historical fiction Costume; Rom-Com; Youth; School
- Written by: Xiong Cheng; Song Jinchuan; Bai Yicong
- Screenplay by: Guo Qi; Zhang Han; Meng Yuan
- Directed by: Nelson Chau
- Presented by: Sun Zhonghuai
- Starring: Wang Yuwen; Caesar Wu; Liu Yichang; Xie Binbin; Qi Peixin
- Opening theme: "The Moment the Flower Blooms" by Wang Yuwen and Caesar Wu
- Ending theme: "A Faraway Dream" by Caesar Wu
- Country of origin: China
- Original language: Mandarin
- No. of seasons: 1
- No. of episodes: 24

Production
- Executive producer: Han Zhijie
- Producers: Fang Fang; Lu Xuanzhu; Wang Juan
- Production location: Xiangshan Global Studios
- Running time: 45 minutes
- Production companies: Tencent Penguin Pictures; Perfect Starry Sky; Tencent Premiere Pictures

Original release
- Network: Tencent Video
- Release: April 20 – May 4, 2020

The Chang'an Youth (simplified Chinese: 长安少年行; traditional Chinese: 長安少年行; pinyin: Cháng'ān Shàonián Xíng) is a 2020 Chinese television series starring Wang Yuwen and Caesar Wu, alongside Liu Yichang, Xie Binbin, and Qi Peixin. It aired in Tencent Video on 20 April until 4 May 2020 every Mondays and Tuesdays for 24 episodes.

== Plot ==
Shen Yiyi (played by Wang Yuwen) lives in the city as an orphan since her childhood and has excellent cooking skills. After being taken by the Shen Family, Yiyi befriends with Shen Dieyi (played by Ji Meihan) and care each other like a sister. However, Dieyi abruptly dies of a cough and her life remains a mystery. In order to repay all of Dieyi and Shen Family's kindness to her, Shen Yiyi replace Dieyi's position and adopt her name, then goes to Chang'an for fulfill the marriage contract with the Tang Family. In there as well, Yiyi wants to find out the truth behind her best friend's life.

In order to delay the marriage, Yiyi dresses up like a man and enters the Shangyi School along with Dieyi's fiancé, a handsome flower boy Tang Jiuhua (played by Xie Binbin). In there, they two also meet Yang Zi'an (played by Caesar Wu) who secretly carrying out the Emperor's order for hide his identity, the sweet 2nd Prince Li Xinyuan (played by Qi Peixin) and a high and mighty swordsman Dugu Muxue (played by Liu Yichang). In their education pursuit, they five, who bear secrets of their own learn to trust each other and become best friends, solve many strange cases or mysterious case (corrupt officials), face to face with the embassy of the East Kingdom, also form the "Five Students (Sons) of Shangyi" those making them be famous in whole of Chang'an. Beside that, they must ride out the difficulties and bring peace to the Kingdom.

== Cast ==
=== Main ===
- Wang Yuwen as Shen Yiyi / Shen Dieyi
  - Zhangshang Minzu as young Shen Yiyi
  - A Market Chef. Smart and clever, but outspoken, Shen Yiyi actually was an orphan since childhood, but later was taken home as the member of Shen Family and be good friends with Shen Dieyi, the only daughter (not biological) of the Shen Family, they also take care each other like a sister. In there, Yiyi was taught painting and calligraphy, but her most interest and good at cooking. For pay Dieyi's kindness, Shen Family's nurturing, and Dieyi's life experience after her death, Yiyi replaced Dieyi's identity and replaced her in marriage contract with the Tang Family. Then, in order to postpone the wedding date with Tang Jiuhua, she accepted his proposal and disguised herself as a man and goes to Shangyi School to study. In the entrance examination of Shangyi School, she tried every means to prevent herself from being selected and separated from Tang Jiuhua to delay the wedding, but the less she wanted to come, he would come. In the martial arts test, she is advanced 25 places for helping the elderly on the side of the road while running. During the literary examination, the graffiti on the examination paper provokes the Emperor's anger and after cleverly defending herself, she escapes and makes Longyan rejoice. Therefore, the Emperor name her with Shangyi's first name. She become one of 5 students in Shangyi School, in charge of cooking. She and Yang Zi'an become the most witty and have the highest IQ in Shangyi School. As they two stay and live together, both of them starting like and interest on each other and then get married.
- Caesar Wu as Yang Zi'an
  - Initially is the Prime Minister's illegitimate son, his real identity is the Imperial Court's supervisory historian and is sent to Shangyi School to investigate a case. Cold-faced but warm-hearted, Yang Zi'an is good at logical reasoning. He and Shen Yiyi who are the most witty and have the highest IQ in Shangyi School, they two later stay and live together. Yang Zi'an is one of the 5 students in Shangyi School, in charge of chess art. He later purchased the Ningxiang Pavilion and gave it to Yiyi, then become the owner of Wuweiju and get married with her.
- Liu Yichang as Dugu Muxue
  - Xiao Tianren as young Dugu Muxue
  - A Dashing Swordsman who is an orphan since child, he later adopted by the general and become his righteous son.
- Xie Binbin as Tang Jiuhua (dubbed by Wu Tao)
  - Zeng Zilong as young Tang Jiuhua
  - The only son of the Minister of Army. Initially Shen Dieyi's fiancé and already had a marriage contract her. However, due to her death before they get married, he later befriends with Han Yu'er and later, they live together. He loves musical and dance so much, and become one of the 5 students in Shangyi School, in charge of singing and dancing.
- Qi Peixin as Xiao Xinyuan / Li Xinyuan
  - The Second Prince who studying in Shangyi School under a Pseudonym, his real name is Xiao Xinyuan and is Consort Yang's son. Not favored, he likes weird inventions, eat meat and understands Zhouyi's deduction. His favourite is to fly a kite because he feels that he is free when doing this. After his older brother is killed and died, he later chosen as the Crown Prince by the Emperor. He actually has crush on Shen Yiyi, but after knowing and understanding that she loves Yang Zi'an, Xinyuan decides to keep this love in his deep heart and hope Yiyi is happy with Yang Zi'an. He is one of the students in Shangyi School, in charge of arithmetic.

=== Supporting ===
- Li Boyang as Han Yu'er
  - The only daughter of Prime Minister of War. Innocent and romantic, Han Yu'er using to pretend like a man. She and Tang Jiuhua is a best friend and later life together.
- Jin Zhong as Yang Zixu
  - The Son of the Prime Minister and an assistant professor in Shangyi School. He is Yang Zi'an's older brother.
- Wen Qing as Xiaorou / Ningxiang
  - Chen Duoyi as young Xiaorou / Ningxiang
  - The owner of Ningxiang Pavilion whom her true identity is a double agent and an assassin, her real name is Xiaorou. She and Dugu Muxue were childhood sweethearts but are forced to separate due to an accident.
- Xie Shiyu as Xiao Lingjun
  - The Crown Prince and Xiao Xinyuan's older brother. He always wants to take over the throne and often framed Li Xinyuan, but later was shot and killed.
- Yuan Zhongyuan as Han Junji
  - The Prime Minister of War and Han Yu'er's father.
- Cheng Guodong as Yang Wenyuan
  - The Prime Minister and the father of Yang Zixu and Yang Zi'an.
- Liu Ninghao as Bai Shaoqian
  - One of the students in Shangyi School and Tang Jiuhua's little follower. He accidentally broke through the sweetness of Shen Yiyi and Yang Zi'an many times and his outlook on life was destroyed.
- Xing Yang as Lin Boshi, the Professor of Shangyi School.
- Ji Meihan as the real Shen Dieyi
  - Zhang Youbao as young Shen Dieyi
  - Actually the orphan of the former Crown Prince, but later become the only daughter of the Shen family. Since child, she and Yiyi growing up together and regards each other like a sister. As Yiyi taught her, Shen Dieyi also become proficient in calligraphy and painting. She has a marriage contract with Tang Jiuhua but before their marriage, she died because of her own illness.
- Xie Lirun as Wang Zhaocai
  - One of the students in Shangyi School, he and Wang Jinbao firstly often bullied and instigated peoples (especially Shen Yiyi and Yang Zi'an).
- Xie Lizhou as Wang Jinbao
  - One of the students in Shangyi School, he and Wang Zhaocai firstly often bullied and instigated peoples (especially Shen Yiyi and Yang Zi'an).
- Lu Zhong as Old Master Shen, Shen Dieyi's adopted father.

==== Tang Family ====
- Wang Nianqing as Tang Jiuhua's father and head of the Tang Family.
- Zhang Liqiu as Tang Jiuhua's grandmother.
- Jia Shuyi as Tang Jiuhua's mother.

=== Other ===
- Bai Majing as King Yu
- Feng Dalu as Ji Jiu
- Lu Wenbo as Envoy Yu
- Wang Yuzheng as General Li
- Lu Jianwei as Hei Mianshen, the "Black-faced God"
- Liu Guannan as the Ex Crown Prince
- Peng Yang as the Ex Crown Princess Consort
- Luo Yundan as the General's wife
- Li Linqing as the General's wife's maid
- Zhang Aiyue as Aunt Zhang
- Fu Wanjun as Aunt Zhang's husband
- Gao Shou as Zhang Gu
- Niu Xikui as Eunuch Wu
- Yu Xiaotong as Ye Tianshi
- Ding Shikun as Wen Tao
- Wang Yang as Wu Lu
- Ren Feng as Xiao Fengzi
- Liu Shenzhi as Lieutenant Gao
- Mei Mei as Qiu Yue
- Jia Jiayue as a Dancer
- Yue Chunyu as the Leader of Snake Head
- Zhao Qiang as a Fighter
- Lou Zhipeng as Servant of Yu Manor
- Zhang Songqiao as Secret guard of An Manor
- Apa Erjiang as a Tuoxi Army Commander
- Li Xiang as a Tuoxi Army Commander
- Lei Da as a Yulin Army Commander
- Hai Ou as a Yulin Army Second Commander

== Production ==
- This series is the first Wang Yuwen and Caesar Wu working together in the same title, also Caesar Wu's second TV series and first leading role after playing one of the "F4" in Meteor Garden.
- This series started filming in March 2019 in Xiangshan Global Studios and finished in June 2020.
- It is firstly aired in Mainland China by WeTV, Mango TV, Line TV, LiTV and myVideo on 20 April 2020. It also in Taiwan on the same date by WeTV.

== Soundtrack ==
No.	Title	Lyrics	Music	Singer	Length
1.	"The Moment the Flower Blooms (花开的瞬间)" (Opening Theme Song)	Di Chunxiao	Lin Junhui	Wang Yuwen; Caesar Wu
2.	"A Faraway Dream (遥不可及的梦)" (Ending Theme Song)	Di Chunxiao	Chen Yubin	Caesar Wu
3.	"Proud of Me (为我骄傲)"	Di Chunxiao; Jin Zhong	Lin Junhui; Chen Yubin	Liu Yichang
4.	"Want To Say (想说)"	Yao Xincen	Ren Dingyi	Estelle Chen Yihan

== Broadcast ==
Channel	Country	Showing Time	Notes
WeTV; Mango TV	Mainland China	April 20, 2020	
WeTV	Taiwan	April 20, 2020	
Line TV	Taiwan	April 21, 2020	
LiTV	Taiwan	April 21, 2020	Every Tuesdays.
myVideo	Taiwan	—N/a	Every Tuesdays.
