= Wang Yuwen (Chinese actress) =

Chinese actress (born 1997)

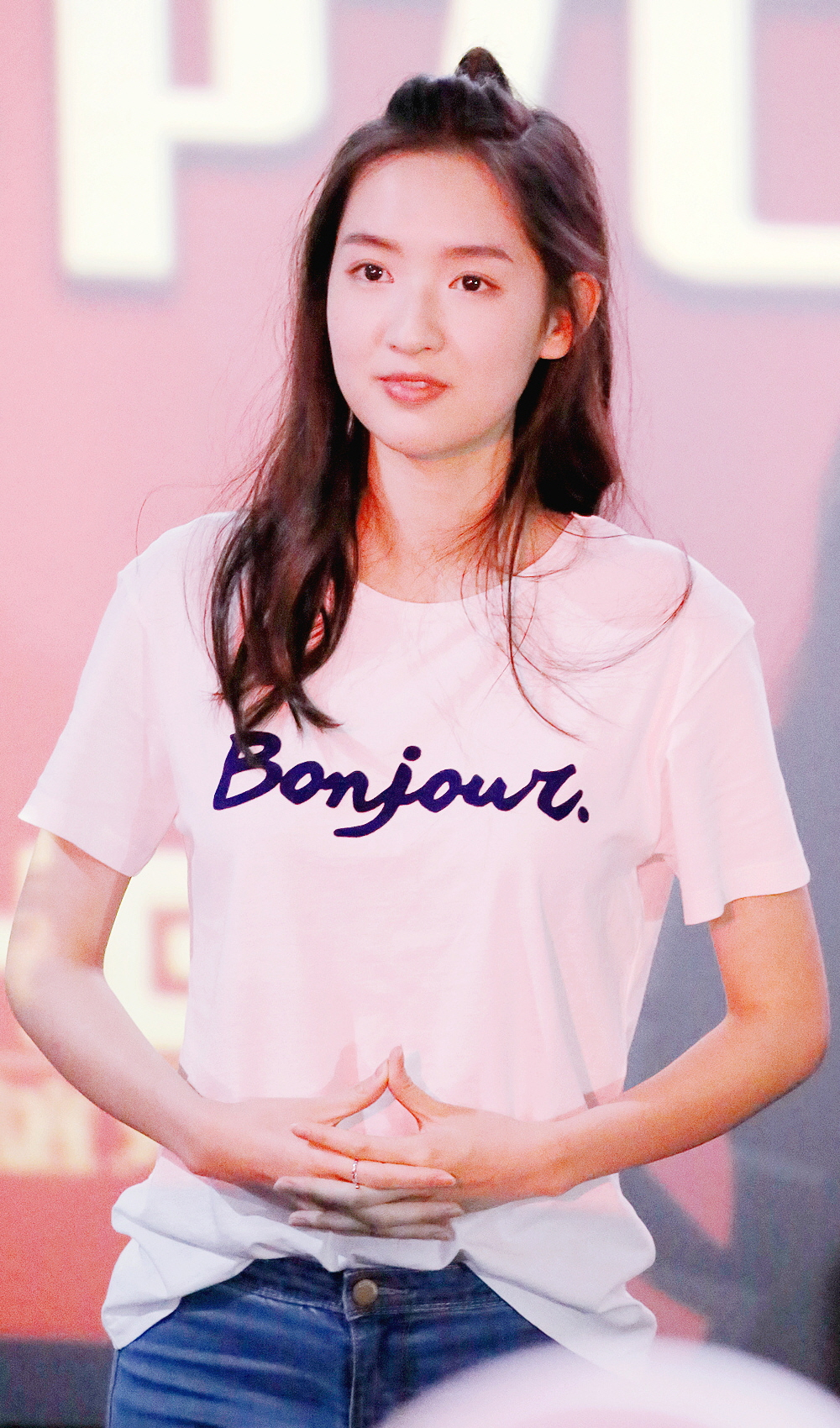
- Wang in 2018
- Born: 28 May 1997 (age 29); Wuhan, Hubei, China
- Other name: Uvin
- Education: Beijing Dance Academy
- Occupation: Actress
- Years active: 2015–present

Chinese name
- Chinese: 王玉雯
Transcriptions
Standard Mandarin
- Hanyu Pinyin: Wáng Yùwén

Wang Yuwen (Chinese: 王玉雯; born 28 May 1997) is a Chinese actress. She is known for her roles in the film An Elephant Sitting Still (2018), as well as the television series Once We Get Married (2021) and The Love You Give Me (2023).

== Career ==
Wang debuted in the 2016 fantasy campus drama Superstar Academy. She then made her film debut in the youth film Nice To Meet You directed by Gu Changwei, and starred in the youth melodrama Rush to the Dead Summer, based on the novel of the same name written by Guo Jingming.

In 2018, Wang gained attention for starring in the drama film An Elephant Sitting Still. The same year, she starred in the historical drama Secret of the Three Kingdoms, playing the role of Cao Cao's daughter.

In 2020, Wang starred in the fantasy romance drama Novoland: The Castle in the Sky 2 alongside Xu Zhengxi. The same year, she starred in the youth historical romance drama The Chang'an Youth.

In 2021, Wang starred in TV series Once We Get Married alongside Wang Ziqi, which has a contract marriage plot. She reunited with him in 2023 TV series The Love You Give Me.

== Filmography ==
=== Film ===
Year	English title	Chinese title	Role	Notes	Ref.
2015	Love in Number	数字恋爱	Ke Yi	Short film	
2018	An Elephant Sitting Still	大象席地而坐	Huang Ling		
2018	Nice To Meet You	遇见你真好	Ling Caicai		
2019	The Last Wish	小小的愿望	Sima Gang		
2020	Novoland: The Castle in the Sky - Time Reversal	九州天空城之时光回转	Fang Qiwu	Web film	
2025	I Grass I Love	苍茫的天涯是我的爱	Momo		
2026	Invictus	爱是愤怒	Cai Cai		

=== Television series ===
Year	English title	Chinese title	Role	Ref.
2016	Superstar Academy	超星星学园	Cheng Zhi'er	
2017	Rush to the Dead Summer	夏至未至	Li Yanran	
2018	Secret of the Three Kingdoms	三国机密之潜龙在渊	Cao Jie	
2019	Growing Pain	少年派	Deng Xiaoqi	
2020	Novoland: The Castle in the Sky 2	九州·天空城II	Feng Ruche	
2020	The Chang'an Youth	长安少年行	Shen Yiyi / Shen Dieyi	
2021	Once We Get Married	只是结婚的关系	Gu Xixi	
2022	Nobody Knows	胆小鬼	Huang Shu	
2023	In Spite of the Strong Wind	纵有疾风起	Bai Ying	
2023	The Love You Give Me	你给我的喜欢	Min Hui	
2023	Gone with the Rain	微雨燕双飞	Bai Fengyao	
2023	Tiger Crane	虎鹤妖师录	Zhao Xintong	
2024	A Lonely Hero's Journey	孤舟	Xiao Ruotong	
2024	Escape from the Trilateral Slopes	边水往事	Zhao Ziying	
2024	You Are My Lover Friend	舍不得星星	Tang Yang	
2024	Our Days	好团圆	Xiang Nan	
2025	Such a Good Love	值得爱	Dai Daji	
2026	My Page in the 90s	突然的喜欢	Lin Huan'er	
TBA	Night Wanderer	夜旅人	Sheng Qinghui	
TBA	Burning Night	燃霜为昼	Hua Xiaomeng	
TBA	Blade of Vengeance	白衣公卿	Yun Yanjiao	
TBA	Where Her Hemline Brushed	小城春色	Lin Shuang	

=== Television shows ===
Year	English title	Chinese title	Role	Ref.
2016	Real Actor	演技派	Contestant	
2024	All Out Action Season 3	全力以赴的行动派第三季	Cast member	

== Discography ==
Year	English title	Chinese title	Album	Notes
2020	"The Moment the Flower Blooms"	花开的瞬间	The Chang'an Youth OST	with Caesar Wu
