= Anni Baobei =

Chinese novelist (born 1974)

- Born: 励婕; Li Jie; July 11, 1974 (age 52); Ningbo, Zhejiang, China
- Occupations: Novelist, short story writer
- Children: 1
- Writing career
- Pen name: Annie Baby (安妮宝贝); Qing Shan (庆山)
- Language: Chinese
- Period: 1998－
- Genre: Novel

Li Jie (Chinese: 励婕; pinyin: Lì Jié), commonly known by her pen names Anni Baobei or Annie Baby (Chinese: 安妮宝贝) and later Qing Shan (Chinese: 庆山), is a Chinese writer. One of China’s earliest online writers, she gained popularity with works that explore loneliness, urban life, and female sexuality, often termed as petite bourgeoisie literature. Her later works shifted focus to themes of spirituality and introspection.

== Writing career ==
In her early twenties, Li worked at a bank in Ningbo, but her distaste for the job led her to begin her career as an online writer in 1998.

Li developed an online audience before publishing in print. In 2000, she began writing for the website Rongshuxia (Under the Banyan Tree), which was one of China's first literary forums. In that same year, she published Goodbye, Vivian, a collection of short stories; this was her first print publication, and would sell half a million copies.

Li has also worked as an editor of the literary journal Open and as a translator of children's books. Her work appears in Chinese magazines Harvest, Writers and Elle.

== Personal life ==
Li gave birth to a daughter on October 1, 2007. She lives in the suburbs of Beijing.

== Works ==
- Goodbye, Vivian (告別薇安) (2000), short story
- Qiyue and Ansheng (七月与安生) (2000), short story
- Endless August (八月未央) (2001), short story
- The Flower Across the Bank (彼岸花)
- Spring Banquet, novel
- The Road of Others (去往别处的路上), short story
- Two or Three Things (二三事) (2004), novel
- Lotus (莲花) (2006), novel: The main characters, Shansheng and Qingzhao, travel on foot to a village in Tibet, where one of Shansheng's boyhood friends works as a teacher. Information about Shansheng and Qingzhao is revealed in flashbacks: they are successful in their professional lives, but feel disillusioned with life in the city. Ultimately, the two attempt to make a life for themselves outside of the confines of contemporary Chinese society.
- Padma (莲花) (2006), novel
- The Beauty of Old Books

Note that many of Li's works do not yet have standardized English translations.

== Media adaptations ==
- Soulmate (2016 film) starring Sandra Ma and Zhou Dongyu; based on Qiyue and Ansheng
- Another Me (2019 television series) starring Shen Yue, Chen Duling, and Xiong Ziqi; based on Qiyue and Ansheng
- Beautiful Reborn Flower (2019 television series) starring Song Weilong, Lin Yun, Peter Ho, and Li Xin'ai; based on The Flower Across the Bank
- Endless Summer (upcoming film) starring Luo Jin, Zhong Chuxi, and Tan Songyun; based on August Never Ends
