= Xinrui =

Xinrui is a Chinese given name. Notable people with the name include:

- Deng Xinrui (born 2003), Chinese sprinter
- Ma Xinrui (born 1994), Chinese actress and model
- John Huang Xinrui (fl. 1937–1941), a World War II fighter ace from China
