= Caesar Wu =

Chinese actor and model

Wu Xi Ze
- Born: October 19, 1996 (age 29); Shenzhen, Guangdong Province, China
- Other name: Caesar Wu
- Occupations: Actor; model
- Years active: 2017–present
- Agent: M.Y. Entertainment

Chinese name
- Traditional Chinese: 吳希澤
- Simplified Chinese: 吴希泽
Transcriptions
Standard Mandarin
- Hanyu Pinyin: Wú Xī Zé

Wu Xize (Chinese: 吴希泽; pinyin: Wú Xī Zé, born 19 October 1996), also known as Caesar Wu, is a Chinese actor, singer and model. He is best known for his role as Ximen Yan in the television series Meteor Garden (2018), which propelled him to international fame.

== Early life ==
Wu Xize was born on 19 October 1996 in Shenzhen, Guangdong Province of China.

== Career ==
Wu rose to fame with his debut role as Ximen Yan in the 2018 television series Meteor Garden, the remake of popular Taiwanese drama series Meteor Garden and based on the Japanese shōjo manga series Boys Over Flowers (花より男子, Hana Yori Dango) written by Yoko Kamio. Wu appeared in Harper's Bazaar China with his Meteor Garden costars Dylan Wang, Darren Chen and Connor Leong in the November issue.

In 2018, he participated in Hunan Satellite TV's variety show Happy Camp and CCTV Sports Channel's football-themed talk show Qi Tan Eleven.

In 2019, Wu was cast in the youth historical drama The Chang'an Youth, and historical romance drama General's Lady.

In 2021, he starred in the costume romance micro-drama, The Dreamlike Seal.

In 2022, he starred in the fantasy suspense romance drama, Shining for One Thing.

== Filmography ==
=== Television series ===
Year	English title	Chinese title	Role	Network	Notes/Ref.
2018	Meteor Garden	流星花园	Ximen Yan	Hunan TV	
2020	The Chang'an Youth	长安少年行	Yang Zi'an	Tencent Video	
2020	General's Lady	将军家的小娘子	Chu Xiuming	Youku	
2021	Heart of Loyalty	一片冰心在玉壶	Zhan Zhao	Youku	
2021	The Dreamlike Seal	如梦令	Fu Ye	Tencent Video	
2021	Faith Makes Great	理想照耀中国	Li Zhen Xing	Hunan TV	Support role
2022	Shining for One Thing	一闪一闪亮星星	Zhan Yu	iQIYI	
2023	Sisterhood	南洋女儿情	Yu Shixiang	iQIYI	Support role
2023	Egg and Stone	少女闯江湖	Jiang Buting	iQIYI	
2025	The Best Thing	爱你	Yan Heng	iQIYI	Support role
TBA	Never Wronged	读心客与无冤行者	Song He		
TBA	Girl's Jianghu	少女江湖	Liu Yuan Xiu		
TBA	Meet Me in Your Sound	幻乐森林	Jin Shang Yu	iQIYI	
TBA	Live Long and Prosper	咸鱼飞升	Yuan Qingshi	Hunan TV/ Mango TV	

=== Variety show ===
Year	English title	Chinese title	Role
2018	Happy Camp	快乐大本营	Guest with 2018 F4
2018	Phanta City	幻乐之城	Guest with 2018 F4
2018	Day Day Up	天天向上	Guest with 2018 F4
2018	The Inn 2	亲爱的·客栈2	Guest
2019	Yi Qi Zhui Guang Ba	益起追光吧	Cast Member
2019	Super Nova Games: Season 2	超新星全运会第二届	Cast Member

== Discography ==
Year	English title	Chinese title	Album	Notes
2018	"For You"	—N/a	Meteor Garden 2018 OST	with Dylan Wang, Darren Chen, and Connor Leong
2018	"Creating Memories"	创造回忆	Meteor Garden 2018 OST	with Dylan Wang, Darren Chen, and Connor Leong
2018	"Never Would've Thought of"	从来没想到	Meteor Garden 2018 OST	with Dylan Wang, Darren Chen, and Connor Leong
2018	"I Miss You Thinking About Going Crazy"	想你想到快疯了	Meteor Garden 2018 OST	with Dylan Wang, Darren Chen, and Connor Leong
2020	"The Moment the Flower Blooms"	花开的瞬间	The Chang'an Youth OST	with Wang Yuwen
2020	"A Faraway Dream"	遥不可及的梦	The Chang'an Youth OST	
2020	"Only For You"	为一人	General's Lady OST	with Tang Min
