= Darren Chen =

Taiwanese actor and model

- 官鴻
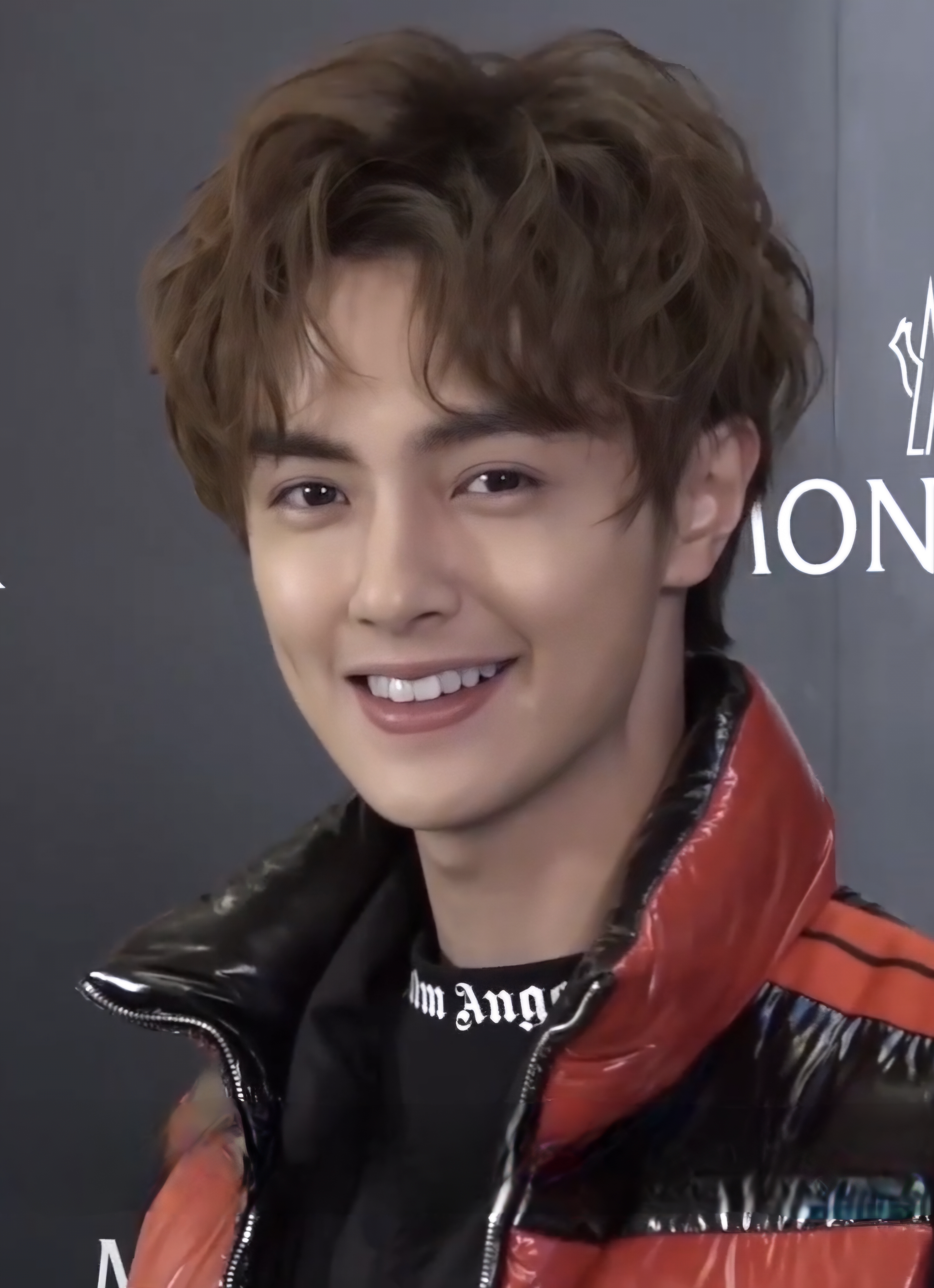
- Chen in October 2018
- Born: Chen Kuan-Hung; 15 January 1995 (age 31); Taiwan
- Education: Taipei Municipal Heping High School
- Occupation: Actor
- Years active: 2016–present
- Height: 184 cm (6 ft 0 in)

Chinese name
- Traditional Chinese: 官鴻
- Simplified Chinese: 官鸿
Transcriptions
Standard Mandarin
- Hanyu Pinyin: Guān Hóng
Yue: Cantonese
- Jyutping: Gun1 Hung4
Southern Min
- Hokkien POJ: Koaⁿ-hông

Kuan Hong (simplified Chinese: 官鸿; traditional Chinese: 官鴻; pinyin: Guān Hóng; Pe̍h-ōe-jī: Koaⁿ-hông, born 15 January 1995), also known as Darren Chen, is a Taiwanese actor and model. He is best known for his roles in Meteor Garden (2018), My Unicorn Girl, and The Sleuth of the Ming Dynasty (2020).

== Early life and education ==
Darren Chen was born on January 15, 1995, in Taipei, Taiwan. He graduated from the Taipei Municipal Heping High School. His college major was in English. He enjoys playing billiards, badminton, and ping pong. After graduation, Darren considered going for a professional billiards course before choosing to go into modeling.

== Career ==
=== 2016–2018: Beginnings and rising popularity ===
In 2016, Chen made his acting debut as Lin Yutang in the youth fantasy web series Proud of Love and its sequel.

In 2017, Chen was cast in the role of Hua Ze Lei by Angie Chai in the 2018 adaptation of Meteor Garden, based on the Japanese shōjo manga series Boys Over Flowers (花より男子, Hana Yori Dango) written by Yoko Kamio. He appeared in Harper's Bazaar China with his Meteor Garden costars Dylan Wang, Connor Leong, and Caesar Wu in the November issue. The series was first broadcast in Hunan TV in 9 July 2018, and Chen rose to fame. The same year was confirmed to make his big screen debut with a guest appearance in the romance comedy film Oversize Love.

=== 2019–present: Leading roles ===
In 2019, Chen was cast in his first leading role in the historical mystery drama The Sleuth of the Ming Dynasty, produced by Jackie Chan. The series premiered on iQiyi on April 1, 2020. The same year, he starred in the youth sports drama My Unicorn Girl.

In 2021, he starred in the TV Series, No Boundary and No Boundary Season 2.

== Filmography ==
=== Film ===
Year	English title	Chinese title	Role	Notes/Ref.
2020	Oversize Love	月半爱丽丝	Huang Ke	
2020	Your Love Song	你的情歌	Wang Shi Ze	Support Role

=== Television series ===
Year	English title	Chinese title	Role	Network	Notes/Ref.
2016	Proud of Love	别那么骄傲	Lin Yutang	Youku	
2017	Proud of Love 2	别那么骄傲2	Lin Yutang	Youku	
2018	Meteor Garden	流星花园	Huaze Lei	Hunan TV	
2020	The Sleuth of the Ming Dynasty	成化十四年	Tang Fan	IQIYI	
2020	My Unicorn Girl	盔甲上的少女	Wen Bing	IQIYI	
2021 |	No Boundary	玉昭令	Zhan Yan	IQIYI	
2021 |	No Boundary Season 2	玉昭令第二季	Zhan Yan	IQIYI	
2022	To Be A Brave One	致勇敢的你	Shao Mo Li	Youku	
2022	Twenty Your Life On Season 2	二十不惑2	Xiao He	Hunan TV	Guest Role
2023	Her World	她的城	Li Ao Lin	IQIYI	
2024	Reborn for Love	四海重明	Yin Ya	IQIYI	
2024	Pretty Boy	君子如玉	Jun Ru Yu	IQIYI	
2025	Shadow Love	与晋长安	Mo Yin	IQIYI	Support Role
2025	Destiny Of Love	错嫁世子妃	Fu Cheng Jin	Tencent	
TBA	The Great Dreamer	大梦想家	Xu Chen Dong	IQIYI	Adapted from the web novel "Da Meng Xiang Jia" (大梦想家) by Xing He Fu You (星河蜉蝣)

=== Variety shows ===
Year	English title	Chinese title	Role
2018, 2021	Happy Camp	快乐大本营	Guest
2018	Day Day Up	天天向上	Guest with Meteor Garden costars
2018	Phanta City	幻乐之城	Guest with Meteor Garden costars
2018	Heart Signal	心动的信号	Host
2019	Ace Vs. Ace: Season 4	王牌对王牌 4	Guest
2019	Keep Running: Season 7	奔跑吧， 奔跑吧兄弟	Guest
2019	Super Nova Games: Season 2	超新星全运会第二届	Regular Member
2020	Summer Surf Shop	夏日冲浪店	Guest
2022	Why Not Love?	我不恋爱的理由	Guest
2023	Yes, I Do Season 4	喜欢你我也是 第四季	Main Host
2023	You Dian Yi Si Duan Pian Da Sai	有点意思短片大赛	Regular Member
2025	We Are the Champions Season 4	战至巅峰 第四季	Guest [SSTX]
2025	Wonderland Junior Season 4	桃花坞开放中 第四季	Regular Member

=== Games ===
Year	English title	Chinese title	Role	Developer	Notes/Ref.
2025	Road to Empress	盛世天下	Li Zhi / Prince Jin	New One Studio	Based on the video game 盛世天下 by Orange Light Game

== Discography ==
Year	English title	Chinese title	Album	Notes/Ref.
2018	"For You"	—N/a	Meteor Garden 2018 OST	with Dylan Wang, Connor Leong and Caesar Wu.
2018	"Creating Memories"	创造回忆	Meteor Garden 2018 OST	with Dylan Wang, Connor Leong and Caesar Wu.
2018	"Never Would've Thought of"	从来没想到	Meteor Garden 2018 OST	with Dylan Wang, Connor Leong and Caesar Wu.
2018	"The Tenderness Behind the Flower"	花背后的温柔	Meteor Garden 2018 OST	
2020	"Mortal World "	凡尘	The Sleuth of the Ming Dynasty OST	
2020	"Late at Night"	夜阑珊	The Sleuth of the Ming Dynasty OST	with Fu Meng-po and Liu Yaoyuan
2020	"Yes I Do"		"Yes I Do" single	
2023	"Blue"	—N/a	Her World OST	
