= Another Me (TV series) =

- Promotional poster
- Also known as: Qiyue and Ansheng
- Genre: Romance; Youth
- Written by: Yicong Bai; Jie Li
- Directed by: Liang Cui
- Starring: Shen Yue; Chen Duling; Xiong Ziqi; Zou Tingwei
- Country of origin: China
- Original language: Mandarin
- No. of episodes: 53

Production
- Producer: Luo Junhui
- Production location: Ningbo
- Running time: 45 minutes

Original release
- Network: iQiyi
- Release: July 22 – September 4, 2019

Another Me (Chinese: 七月与安生; pinyin: Qī Yuè Yǔ ānshēng) is a 2019 Chinese television series starring Shen Yue, Chen Duling, Xiong Ziqi and Zou Tingwei. It is based on the 2016 film Soul Mate which is an adaptation of the novel of the same name by Anni Baobei. The series aired on iQiyi from July 22 to September 4, 2019.

== Plot ==
An Sheng and Qiyue grew up together in a small city in the South. The two girls had contrasting personalities: An Sheng is bright and energetic, while Qiyue is quiet and reserved. They met one rainy day, when Qiyue handed an umbrella to An Sheng and disappeared. From that day on, they were best friends and attended the same school. Yet, they would eventually become tangled in a love triangle.

An Sheng helped Qiyue pursue Jia Ming, but Jia Ming gradually became attracted to the interesting An Sheng. In order to save their friendship, An Sheng decided to start a new relationship with another man. After graduating university, Qiyue planned her wedding with Jia Ming, but Jia Ming couldn't forget An Sheng. He left Qiyue in search of An Sheng, and that day, the friendship between An Sheng and Qiyue was ruined.by a friend

== Cast ==
=== Main ===
- Shen Yue as Li An Sheng
- Chen Duling as Lin Qiyue
- Xiong Ziqi as Su Jiaming
- Zou Tingwei as Han Dong

=== Supporting ===
- Connor Leong as Lin Jiu Yue
- Cui Baoyue as Tian Xunlei
- Qiao Junda as Xu Tian
- A Pan

== Production ==
The drama started filming in Ningbo on May 6, 2018. It wrapped up filming on September 3, 2018.

== Soundtrack ==
No.	Title	Lyrics	Music	Singers	Length
1.	"Qiyue and Ansheng (七月与安生)" (Theme song)	Liao Yu	Liao Yu	Shen Yue & Chen Duling
2.	"Qiyue and Ansheng (七月与安生)"	Liao Yu	He Guanghui	Aimee Yang
3.	"Time Will Not Lie To Us (时光不会骗我们)" (Ending theme song)	Dai Yuedong	Cen Siyuan	Liu Ruiqi
4.	"Stolen Misses (被劫持的思念)"			You Zhangjing

== Awards and nominations ==
Award	Category	Nominated work	Result	Ref.
The Third Internet Film Festival	Most Promising Director	Wei Jie	Won	
15th Chinese American Film Festival	Best Television Series	Another Me	Won	
Golden Bud - The Fourth Network Film And Television Festival	Best Web Series	Another Me	Nominated	
Golden Bud - The Fourth Network Film And Television Festival	Best Actress	Shen Yue	Nominated	
