= In Spite of the Strong Wind =

2022–2023 Chinese television series

- 浮图缘
- Genre: Drama
- Written by: Li Xiao; Jiang Wu
- Directed by: Fei Zhenxiang
- Starring: Jin Dong; Song Jia; Tian Yu; Yang Jue; Zhou Maijie; Wang Yuwen
- Country of origin: China
- Original language: Mandarin
- No. of episodes: 39 episodes

Production
- Producers: Liang Jing; Zhu Wenjiu; Yang Weijie; Cai Wenjing
- Production locations: Hangzhou, China
- Running time: 45 minutes
- Production companies: Beijing Satellite TV; Jiangsu Satellite TV; Xinli TV Culture Investment Co., Ltd.; Zhejiang Xianjun Film and Television Culture Co., Ltd.

Original release
- Network: Tencent Video
- Release: 1 January 2023

In Spite of the Strong Wind (Chinese: 纵有疾风起; pinyin: Zòng yǒu jífēng qǐ) is an urban emotional drama directed by Fei Zhenxiang, starring Jin Dong, Song Jia, Tian Yu, and Yang Jue, Zhou Maijie and Wang Yuwen.

The play tells the story of Tang Chen, who was "betrayed" by his girlfriend Shuo Bing when his career was booming and had to declare bankruptcy. He soon devoted himself to his second venture. After falling in love with Shuo Bing and fighting several games, he finally understood the story of Shuo Bing's seemingly ruthless choice at the beginning.

The drama premiered on Beijing Satellite TV and Jiangsu Satellite TV on January 1, 2023, and was simultaneously broadcast on Tencent Video and iQiyi. On August 8, Tencent Video and iQiyi non-members closed.

== Synopsis ==
When Tang Chen's career was booming, he was "betrayed" by his girlfriend Shuo Bing and had to declare bankruptcy. But soon he withdrew from the swamp of failure and actively devoted himself to his second venture. Sha Zhou, a good friend for many years, has excellent writing skills, but has always been a depressed little reporter. With Tang Chen's persuasion and his wife's support, he was the first to join the entrepreneurial team. According to the division of labor within the team, Tang Chen and Sha Zhou worked together to find Hou Zhi, Zhu Ran and Bai Ying, and established Gray Whale PR Company. Using his years of experience in the industry, Tang Chen actively searched for customers, led his partners to overcome difficulties, helped pig feed king Xie Liqiang build a public opinion image, popularized Mao Mao's Divine Comedy, and won the public relations contract of Feida Company. However, in the confrontation with the competing company, Tang Chen discovered the secret between Shuo Bing and Ye Shouru. With the concern of another identity, Tang Chen and Shuo Bing fell in love and killed each other, and after several games, they finally understood Shuo Bing's seemingly ruthless choice at the beginning. In the end, the two teamed up to punish Ye Shouru, the culprit who caused Shuo Bing's father to commit suicide, and they got back together. Each member of Gray Whale PR has also realized its own value.

== Cast ==
=== Main ===
- Jin Dong as Tang Chen
  - Started a business in the middle age and opened a public relations company. While he is vigorous and resolute in the workplace, he is also humorous in life. He was about to marry and have children with the woman he loved, but he was betrayed by his girlfriend and had to declare bankruptcy. The company he had worked so hard to start disappeared overnight. After he went bankrupt, he didn't fail, but actively invested in his second venture. He was in love with Shuo Bing, and after several games, he finally understood Shuo Bing's seemingly ruthless choice.
- Song Jia as Shun Bing
  - Tang Chen's girlfriend, Tang Chen met again after starting a business. Between the boss's promotion temptation and resignation threat, Shuo Bing decisively chooses to betray her fiancé, which not only makes Tang Chen lose his fortune, but also takes advantage of the opportunity to win his client resources in one fell swoop, thus successfully ascending to the position. Her betrayal was to get close to Ye Shouru, so as to investigate the real cause of her father's death, but she took extreme measures to betray her fiancé. She has always loved Tang Chen, and will secretly help Tang Chen win the contract from Xie Liqiang's company.
- Tian Yu as Sha Zhou
  - Tang Chen's friend for many years, has a good writing style, but has always been a depressed little reporter. His ambition has been on the verge of stirring, wanting to prove himself as a divorced man. He is a failure in marriage. He has a job as a newspaper editor. He earns a monthly salary of 9,000. Hide first.
- Yang Jue as Zhu Ran
  - The entrepreneurial partner of Tang Chen and Sha Zhou. The legal profession is profound, but the wife who "depends on others" has strict control. As a lawyer, he once played Tang Chen and others in his hands. Under the pressure of "Tigress" Huang Yirou for many years, he just lived a life of fear and muddle along. He loves to watch live broadcasts of beauties, and likes to give rewards, and when he sees them, he smiles even more obscenely.
- Zhou Maijie as Hou Zhi
  - A rich second generation who wants to be independent but can't get rid of his original family. Because of the nature of his work as a paparazzi, he is not very kind, and offended many people, hiding in the bathing center all day, living a life of fear. It was also what happened in the bathing center that convinced him to join Tang Chen's team. With his unique ingenuity, as a man, he also wants to make a name for himself. Under Tang Chen's guidance, he not only gave full play to his "paparazzi" talent.
- Wang Yuwen as Bai Ying
  - Tang Chen's assistant. She used to be a daughter of a rich family. Because of her parents, she was forced to suspend her studies and could only survive by selling alcohol in bars. She met Tang Chen later, and through her own recommendation, she joined Gray Whale. After she joined the "Flying Entrepreneurship Team" with her wit, she worked hard, bravely pursued career progress, and made a bright career in the workplace. After working in the gray whale, she contributed to the smooth progress of several projects and a steady rise in her career.

== Production ==
=== Shooting Process ===
On October 14, 2020, the play was officially launched in Hangzhou, and the leading actors Song Jia, Yang Jue and others attended the opening ceremony.

=== Promotion ===
On October 19, 2020, Tencent Yuewen Xinli held its 2020 annual press conference, and released new materials for In Spite of theStrong Wind on the spot. On June 7, 2021, the show released a trailer. On December 28, 2022, the show released a preview of the version of Breaking the Wind; on December 30, the show announced that it will be scheduled for New Year's Day, and will be broadcast on Beijing Satellite TV, Jiangsu Satellite TV, Tencent Video, Iqiyi premiered on the whole network. On January 1, 2023, the show released the ultimate trailer for the "Hot Blood and Song" version and the character poster for the "Potentially Facing the Wind" version.

== Soundtrack ==
| Name | Native Name | Lyricist | Composer | Singer | Notes |
|---|---|---|---|---|---|
| Appear And Leave | 出现又离开 | Liang Bo | Liang Bo | Na Ying | Opening song |
| This Year | 今年 | Dong Yufang | Sha Baoliang | Sha Baoliang | Episode 1 |
| If | 如果 | Luo Xiaojia & Lu Wen | Luo Xiaojia & Chen Cong | – | Episode 2 |
| Even Though The Wind Blows | 纵使疾风起 | Wu Zhaohui (Hui Zi) | Wu Zhaohui (Hui Zi) | Wu Zhaohui (Hui Zi) | Episode 3 |
| A Blue Sky Awaits | – | Gao Weiran | Gao Weiran | Liang Xiaoxue | Episode 4 |
| The Best Arrangement | 最好的安排 | Gao Weiran | Gao Weiran | – | Episode 5 |

== Critical response ==
He Tianping, deputy secretary-general of the Film and Television Art Professional Committee of China Television Art Exchange Association, and researcher at the Journalism and Social Development Research Center of Renmin University of China reviewed the drama, saying: while "In Spite of theStrong Wind" tells the story of the hero's entrepreneurial journey, it also wraps up and discusses how to get along with intimate relationships such as love, marriage, and family affection. When lawyers Zhu Ran and Tang Chen discussed their marriage and love issues with heart-to-heart discussions, Zhu Ran's words were like "a blow to the head" to Tang Chen. When he came back to his senses, at this moment, he gradually understood the true meaning of such abstract words as mutual respect and mutual understanding. In fact, apart from Tang Chen and Shuo Bing's relationship problems, the marriages of Sha Zhou and Zhu Ran in the play also reflect the problems of many couples in reality. Hou Zhi and Bai Ying represent a kind of love between young people. Hou Zhi and his father The same is true for the twisted family relationship between them. The play deeply depicts multiple intimate relationships, which can quite resonate and empathize with the audience, which in turn makes the play show a strong positive meaning.

In addition, there are many plots full of strong light comedy colors in the play. These plots can often make the audience laugh, and they will find tears in the corners of the eyes after laughing, which brings many surprises to the audience. For example, the team members in the early days of the male protagonist's entrepreneurship showed their magical powers. The plot is very similar to the "Journey to the West team" upgrading and fighting monsters, and the similarities between the team's surnames also made the audience smile knowingly. There are too many jokes like this in the play. These witty brushwork make the whole play show the power of humor in tense and serious, even crisis-ridden public relations events, bringing a joyful and liberating experience of watching the play. In short, under the cloak of light comedy, the play shows the spiritual core that tries to convey to the audience the courage to live without fear. The play reflects a strong sense of conflict in the plot, the plot is ups and downs, full of suspense, showing the tension of the mall like a battlefield. Of course, the light comedy color brings the audience a humorous and relaxed experience of watching the drama. In the relaxed atmosphere of the work, it conveys to the audience the courage and strength of "even if there is a strong wind, life will never give up", and tells the story of life with a realistic plot. In middle-aged life, there is no standard answer, only the fighting spirit of never giving up in life.
