= General's Lady =

Chinese television series

- Also known as: A Young Lady of The General's House; The Little Wife of the General's House
- Genre: Historical fiction Costume; Rom-com; Political
- Based on: A Young Lady of The General's House by Yanbo Jiangnan
- Written by: Qu Shasha; Luo Lina
- Directed by: Qiang Wu
- Starring: Tang Min; Caesar Wu
- Opening theme: "For One Person" by Ye Xuanqing
- Ending theme: "Quiet Moonlight" by Shang Shida
- Country of origin: China
- Original language: Mandarin
- No. of seasons: 1
- No. of episodes: 30

Production
- Producers: Li Nan; Wang Jin; Wang Yan; Hu Lei
- Production location: Hengdian World Studios
- Running time: 45 minutes
- Production companies: Youku; Beijing SG-Culture Media Corp., Ltd

Original release
- Network: Youku
- Release: October 9 – October 31, 2020

General's Lady (Chinese: 将军家的小娘子; pinyin: Jiāngjūn Jiā De Xiǎo Niángzǐ; lit. 'A Young Lady of The General's House') is a 2020 Chinese television series that based on the novel with the same title by Yanbo Jiangnan. It stars Tang Min and Caesar Wu in the title role along with Lu Jia, Liu Yinjun and Cao Junxiang. It firstly aired in Youku on 9 October 2021 every Wednesdays until Saturdays. This series also aired in Taiwan.

This series started filming in October 2019 and finished in January 2020.

== Plot ==
This series is tell about the love story between a playful and lively girl, Shen Jin (played by Tang Min) and a "Demon General" Chu Xiuming (played by Caesar Wu).

Shen Jin grew up in luxury as a member of the royal family. After the emperor decrees an arranged marriage, she is married off to the Earl of Yongning (also known as the "demon general") who defends the borders. Although she falls in love with her husband, Chu Xiu Ming, at first sight, she finds it difficult to blend in. Shen Jin gradually sheds her spoiled and entitled attitude and becomes a force to be reckoned with. With her unconventional methods, she solves many of the army's problems and comes to earn their trust and respect. However, there has been a shakeup in the imperial courts and the Chu army becomes a target. Shen Jin's parents are held hostage against their will while Shen Jin receives orders to act as a spy for the emperor. Can the married couple weather the storms to find happiness and peace?

== Cast ==
=== Main ===
- Tang Min as Shen Jin, the Countess of Yongning (沈錦 永宁伯 夫人)
  - The third daughter of the Rui Mansion. A smart and clever girl who looks dignified and elegant in front of the public, but in fact, she is lively, playful and likes to be informal. Although she came from a noble family, she was never treated well in the mansion due to her being a concubine's daughter. Since child, she was often locked by her second elder sister which made her very good at picking locks. She often dresses like a man in order to explore the city. She has a good relationship with her eldest sister Shen Shu (played by Xin Zi) who often protects her. In order to help her mother have a better life, Shen Jin chooses to marry the "Demon General", Chu Xiuming, whose previous three wives mysteriously died. The pendant that was given to her by her mother attracts Chu Xiuming's attention. Even if both of them liked playing tricks on each other, they fall in love and eventually have a child.
  - Titles:
    - Shen Jin, the 3rd miss of Prince Rui's mansion (沈錦 瑞王府三小姐)
    - Countess of Yongning (永宁伯 夫人)
- Caesar Wu as Chu Xiuming, the Earl of Yongning (永宁伯)
  - Zhu Bailin as young Chu Xiuming
  - He is a brave man, good at fighting and has excellent martial arts strength. His three former wives were rumored to be killed because of adultery, but were in fact spies sent by his enemies. Later, he marries Shen Jin after being decreed by the emperor. Although he is suspicious of Shen Jin at first, slowly she becomes his confidant and friend and he falls in love with her after dispelling his suspicions. He wants to find out the truth about the eighth prince and his aunt's death.
  - Titles:
    - The Devil General Chu Xiuming (魔鬼将军 楚修明)
    - Earl of Yongning (永宁伯)

=== Supporting ===
==== People in the Earl of Yongning's mansion ====
- Lu Jia as Rou Rou
  - Shen Jin's maid who has a crush on Xiao Su. Later, she marries him and has his child.
- Liu Yinjun as Xiao Su, the Commander of Jinweijun (禁卫军统领)
  - Shen Jin’s and Rou Rou’s childhood playmate, who fell in love with the latter and married her.
- Cao Junxiang as Chu Xiuyan/Shen An
  - Zhang Zihan as young Chu Xiuyuan/Shen An
  - His real name is Shen An but he changes his name to Chu Xiuyuan after becoming Chu Xiuming's brother in-name. As Shen An, he is a tough lieutenant in the barracks and as Chu Xiuyuan, he is an amiable man. He is the son of the former eighth prince but when his father dies after their mansion catches fire, he is rescued by the emperor and brought back incognito to the Chu Family who raised him in secret. His relationship with Chu Xiuming is very good and therefore he is always respected his sister in-law, Shen Jin. He was also once rescued by Ruo Nan when he was young and therefore is very grateful to her. Later, he becomes the emperor.
  - Titles:
    - Shen An, the Vice General of Chu family's army (沈安 楚家军副將)
    - Supervising City Officer (监市)
    - Emperor (皇帝)
- Ge Shimin as Ruo Nan, the owner of Ruonan Cloth Shop (若男布庄老板)
  - Peng Yulin as young Ruo Nan
  - Shen Jin, Rong Rong, and Xiao Su's childhood playmate. She is a good-hearted woman with a strong sense of responsibility and always takes care of people around her. As a young girl, Ruo Nan had a fight with Shen Jin. Chu Xiuyuan recognizes her as his savior and makes her become his empress not long after his ascension to the throne. As a mother of the country, she is deeply loved and respected by her people.
  - Titles:
    - Ruo Nan, the owner of Ruonan Cloth Shop (吳若男 若男布庄老板)
    - Escort Officer (镖局镖师)
    - Empress Consort (皇后)
- Xu Yiwen as Qing Qiu, the Chief of Yongning Mansion (永寧府的廚娘)
  - All of her juniors and servants in the mansion commonly call her Aunt Qing Qiu (清秋姨).
- Yang Wanli as Bao Zi Tou
  - Chu Xiuming's servant who is in love with Xiao Cong; the two later become a couple.
- You Cong as Xiao Cong
  - One of the Yongning Mansion's maids. Both Chu Xiuyuan and Pao Zitou call her as Lady Xiao Cong (小蔥娘子). She secretly likes the lieutenant Chu Xiuyuan, so she often makes clothes and food for him. However, Chu Xiuyuan does not know her true feelings for him, which makes her feel disappointed. In the end, she becomes Pao Zitou's wife and lives together with him.
- Jiang Haoyang as Yuan'er
  - One of Yongning Mansion's servants. Because Princess Yingzu gets drunk with Shen Jin in the mansion, he takes care of the princess all night. After getting together, the princess asks him to ask her father for her hand in marriage. After he agrees, Yuan'er leaves the Yongning Palace and lives together with the princess; he becomes Prince Consort Yingzu (鹰族驸马).
- Lin Luyao as Ma Ya, Princess Yingzu
  - Yuan'er's lover; she later marries him.
- Jin Le as the Ninth Princess, Princess Dangchao
  - She is the daughter of the Emperor and Consort Chen who likes her guard Su Chen. She admires Shen Jin and Chu Xiuming's feelings so she becomes good friends with Shen Jin.
- Xu Hao as Su Chen, a palace guard in love with Princess Dangchao.

==== Imperial Family ====
- Xin Zi as Shen Shu
  - The oldest daughter of the Rui family. She is close with Shen Jin, her younger half sister. Although she marries a nobleman, her husband never likes her and ends up having a child with his concubine. She also has a miscarriage, which puts her in a precarious position in her husband's family. After getting pregnant again, Shen Shu gives birth to a child as she hoped for.
- Ke Naiyu as Shen Zi
  - The second daughter of the Rui family and Consort Xu's daughter. Savage and willful, she always relies on her father's favor and often bullies Shen Jin. After being trained by Chu Xiuming, she begins to change and get along with Shen Jin; their sister relationship also becomes much closer. She later gets married.
- Xiao Yu as Shen Jing
  - The fourth daughter of the Rui family who likes to bully Shen Jin with Shen Zi. After changing and renewing her relationship with Shen Jin, they are able to get along with each other in harmony. She later gets married.
- Gao Yi as Prince Rui
  - The emperor's brother and the father of Shen Shu, Shen Zi, Shen Jin, and Shen Jing. He prefers his mistress, Bai Xiaoniang and Shen Zi over everyone in his family and often uses his primary wife as his shield. In the peoples' eyes, he is a foolish lord.
- Dong Xiangyu as Consort Chen
  - Shen Jin's birth mother, also known as Lady Gaoming (诰命夫人). A gentle and dignified woman but she is born into a lower-class family and has a humble background. She is not favored in the Rui mansion and often gets bullied by Consort Xu and her husband's other wives.
- Wang Lan as Consort Xu, Shen Zi's mother.
- Li Sha as Princess Rui
  - Shen Shu's mother and Prince Rui's primary wife. Her relationship with Consort Chen and Shen Jin is relatively good. Although she is a concubine at first, she is at a loss to face the contradictions in back house. When Consort Xu and Consort Chen have a conflict because they ask Shen Jin to get married, they are pushed by her husband to act as his shield. She is the eighth princess consort's good friend and keeps secretly giving news to the general while investigating the accident that year.
- Mei Nisha as Consort Bai Xiaoniang, Prince Rui's favourite wife and Shen Zi's birth mother.
- Zhang Yingchen as Emperor Cheng
  - The emperor becomes suspicious of Chu Xiuming after the traitorous officials' investigation, but in fact his heart is like a mirror. He desperately wants to break through the kingdom and unwilling to the throne. When the eighth prince's mansion caught fire many years ago, Chu Xiuyuan was rescued and his name was erased; he was also sent to the Chu Family Army and was raised to prevent him from being victimized by the traitorous officials. Later in episode 31, he surrenders the emperor's position to Chu Xiuyuan.
- Liu Yonggang as Eighth Prince / Hua Daye
  - His real identity is the eighth prince and he reveals his identity and the truth in episode 28.
- Geng Liming as Eighth Princess Consort, the Eighth Prince's wife and Queen of Rui's good friend.
- Liu Yiran as Shen Jin and Chu Xiuming's son.

==== Extended cast ====
- Zhu Yun'er as Yun Niang, Shen Shu's husband's concubine who is pregnant with his baby.
- Liao Songmei as 7th Aunt
- Jing Lu as 8th Aunt
- Liu Yinjun as Xiao Xiao
- Zhao Wenming as Master Situ
- Wang Fangzheng as Wang Min
- Li Yiqin as Da Rou
- He Xingyu as Hu Te
- Zheng Shengli as Liu Qi
- Yue Chunyu as General Zuo
- Xu Ke as Minister Chen
- Xu Meng as Minister Liang
- Chen Baoguo as Father Chu
- Ren Wanjing as Mother Chu
- Yuan Zhiying as A Bin
- Shi Guling as Hu Zi
- Zhao Zhiyan as Su Qiao
- Min Jinfeng as Xiao Qing
- Zheng Yuan as Xiao Bai
- Gao Tian as Xiao Ying
- Zhao Xingze as Commander Yun
- Guo Jianwei as Physician Wang

==== Special appearances ====
- Wang Kunlun as the Eagle Tribe Soldier
- Zhao Yanda as the Head of Eagle Tribe
- Han Liangliang as the Medicine Master of Eagle Tribe
- Yang Chaowei as a Painter
- Lu Huan as a Physician
- Feng Liping as a Villager
- Ge Xingjia as a Painter
- Zhou Yan as a Eunuch
- Yang Bin as Eunuch Da
- Gu Baofeng as a Gardener
- Wang Xinfang as a Physician
- Feng Peng as the Elder

== Soundtrack ==
No.	Title	Lyrics	Music	Singer	Length
1.	"For One Person (为一人)" (Opening Theme Song)	Xiao Chuan	Lu Shilang	Ye Xuanqing
2.	"Quiet Moonlight (静月光)" (Ending Theme Song)	Xingxian Shuichi	Yuan Bo	Shang Shida
3.	"Flowers (花開)"	A Chu	Song Yang	Koala Liu
4.	"Arrival (抵岸)"	Lin Qiao and Liu Enxun	Samuel Cen	Wang Mingyu and Lu Xianghui
5.	"For One Person (为一人)" (Interlude Duet Version)	Xiao Chuan	Lu Shilang	Tang Min and Caesar Wu

== Broadcast ==
Channel	Country	Airing Date	Showing Time
Youku	China	October 9, 2020	
Astro	Malaysia	October 26, 2020	21:00–22:00
Astro HD	Malaysia	October 26, 2020	21:00–22:00
VTV3	Vietnam	May 3, 2022	11:20–12:00
VTV2	Vietnam	January 11, 2023	19:00-19:50
