= The Sleuth of the Ming Dynasty =

Chinese television series

- Chinese: 成化十四年
- Hanyu Pinyin: Chéng Huà Shísì Nián
- Genre: Historical; Mystery
- Based on: Cheng Hua Shi Si Nian by Meng Xishi
- Directed by: Guo Shuang; Yang Huan
- Starring: Darren Chen; Fu Meng-po; Liu Yaoyuan
- Composer: Hong Chuan
- Country of origin: China
- Original language: Mandarin
- No. of seasons: 1
- No. of episodes: 48

Production
- Executive producer: Jackie Chan
- Producers: Yang Pei; Li Mi
- Running time: 45 mins
- Production companies: Zhejiang Guanya Culture Film & Television, iQiyi

Original release
- Network: iQiyi
- Release: April 1 – April 24, 2020

The Sleuth of the Ming Dynasty (Chinese: 成化十四年; pinyin: Chéng Huà Shísì Nián) is a 2020 Chinese television series based on the novel of the same name by Meng Xishi. Produced by Jackie Chan, it stars Darren Chen, Fu Meng-po and Liu Yaoyuan in the lead roles. The drama premiered on iQIYI with multi-languages subtitles on April 1, 2020.

== Synopsis ==
In 15th-century China, a quick-witted government official named Tang Fan (Darren Chen) is the best detective in Beijing. When a nobleman's son is murdered, Tang Fan meets martial arts specialist guardsman Sui Zhou (Fu Meng-Po), who is investigating the disappearance of the Crown Prince's study partner. Realizing that the two cases are connected, the devious and powerful imperial eunuch Wang Zhi (Liu Yao Yuan) convinces the unlikely duo to team up. Realizing their effectiveness, the three begin working together regularly. As they dig deeper into the crimes plaguing the Great Ming's capital, the trio realize that something very sinister is afoot – including a plot to launch a bloody coup. Can they stop the criminal mastermind before time runs out?

== Cast ==
=== Main ===
- Darren Chen (voiced by Su Shangqing) as Tang Fan (courtesy name Runqing), a sixth grade prefecture judge of the Shuntian Prefecture. He is optimistic, kind and known for being a glutton.
- Fu Meng-po as Sui Zhou (courtesy name Guangchuan), a sixth-grade Embroidered Uniform Guard. He is a good cook and a skilled fighter.
- Liu Yaoyuan (voiced by Sun Langlang) as Wang Zhi, Commander of the Western Depot, Chenghua's secret police. Confidante of Imperial Noble Consort Wan. He is known for being both merciless yet upright.

=== Royal family ===
- Cai Heng as the Chenghua Emperor, Sui Zhou's great-uncle.
- Alyssa Chia (voiced by Qiu Qiu) as Imperial Noble Consort Wan, the Emperor's favorite consort, Wang Zhi's patroness, and Wan Tong's sister.
- Fang Xiaoli as Empress Dowager Zhou (voiced by Liu Qian Han), the Emperor's mother and Sui Zhou's great-great-aunt.
- Liu Shijie as the crown prince, the son of the Emperor and Virtuous Consort Ji, but raised by Noble Consort Wan.
- Yang Kairu as Virtuous Consort Ji, mother of the Crown prince, who was killed by Noble Consort Wan.
- Zhao Xiaolu (voiced by He Wenxiao) as Princess Gu'an, cousin of the current Emperor and daughter of the Jingtai Emperor. She harbors hatred toward the current ruler for the plight of her family.
- Yang Kaicheng as Wang Xian, husband of Princess Gu'an. Despite being autistic, he is highly talented in weapon making and invented Bo Lang, a bomb that caused massive explosion.
- Li Taiyan as the Jingtai Emperor, the Chenghua Emperor's uncle, who deposed, and was in turn deposed himself, by the Chenghua Emperor's father.

=== People around Tang Fan ===
- Huangyang Tiantian (voiced by He Guannan) as Dong'er, a maidservant who delivers food to Tang Fan and later follows him. She is highly intelligent and analytical despite her young age. She likes Sui Zhou.
- Mao Yi as Pei Huai, a skilled physician and Tang Fan's close friend. A hapless womanizer until he meets Tang Yu.
- He Nan (voiced by Xu Jiaqi) as Duo'erla, an Oirat girl who clashes with Tang Fan and later befriends him. She came to the Capital in search of her long-lost lover.
- Pan Shiqi as Tang Yu, Tang Fan's sister. She was married to an abusive husband, but got a divorce and later get together with Pei Huai
- Lu Jinhao as He Cheng, Tang Yu's son and Tang Fan's nephew.
- La Mu Yang Zi as Dong Gu, owner and chef of Dong Ji restaurant.
- Zhang Yilong as Wuyun Bulage (Wu Yun), Duo Erla's follower. He is knowledgeable about weaponry and horses.

=== People around Sui Zhou ===
- Xiong Xiong (voiced by Shao Chenliang) as Xue Ling, Sui Zhou's subordinate and friend in the Embroidered Guard.

=== People around Wang Zhi ===
- Yu Mingxuan as Ding Rong, Wang Zhi's subordinate and an expert in many fields.
- Steve Yoo (voiced by Qi Sijia) as Jia Kui, a former soldier who was captured by Sui Zhou after fifteen years on the run for murder. He eventually becomes a bodyguard for Wang Zhi.
- Wei Yunxi (voiced by Yun Hezhui) as Mother Cui, madam of the Huanyi Brothel.

=== Li Zilong and allies ===
- Wang Maolei as Li Zilong, Leader of Bai Yue Sect. Descendant of the House of Li. He aims to stage a coup for revenge.
- Liu Bin as Shang Ming, Commander of the Eastern Depot, one of two imperial secret police forces (the other being the Western Depot).
- Chen Weixu as Wan Tong, head of Jinyiwei guards. Wan Zhen'er's brother
- Gao Lancun (voiced by Liu Cong) as Wan An, Chief Grand Secretary, ally of Li Zilong .
- Yang Junchao (voiced by Ao Lei) as Öštemür (A'shi Tiemu'er), an Oirat Khagan who wants to overthrow the Ming dynasty.
- Zhang Baijia (voiced by Feng Lan) as Qing Ge, a famous courtesan. Li Zilong's god-daughter, who is planted as a mole in Huanyi Brothel.

=== Shun Tian Magistrate Manor ===
- Cao Yang as Pan Bin, prefecture judge of Shun Tian Magistrate Manor. Tang Fan's senior
- Qu Ge as Lao Sun, coroner at Shun Tian Magistrate Manor

=== Extended cast ===
- Chen Mengyao as Feng Qingzi, a courtesan at Huanyi Brothel.
- Gong Ziqi as Lin Chaodong, Feng Qingzi's lover.
- Zhang Zhongxing as Zheng Ying, Marquis Wu'an (voiced by Zhao Ming Zhou).
- Luo Maoyang as Zheng Cheng, elder son of the Wu'an Manor. A wanton playboy. He was killed by Zheng Zhi.
- Zhou Hang as Zheng Zhi, second son of the Wu'An Manor. He killed Zheng Cheng, as he felt that he is an embarrassment to the family name.
- Yang Changqing as Liu Xiang, head eunuch. He killed Han Zao in an attempt to frame Royal Consort Wan.
- Shi Diwen as Han Zao, the crown prince's study companion.
- Shang Chengjun as Huang Jinglong, magistrate of Ji An City. He is known for his cruel and harsh punishments, resulting in the death of many prisoners.
- Qian Rufu as Lu Zhi, magistrate of Tongzhou (later Yunhe).
- Yu Yang as Huang Ying, Huang Jinglong's subordinate.
- Liu Yaoyuan as Yang Fu, a criminal captured by Huang Jinglong that looks identical to Wang Zhi.
- Lu Zhanxiang as Nie Ping, a boy that was jailed for stolen medicine for his mother.
- Gao Jian as Chen Xu, a general guarding the borders. Known for his uprightness and fierce loyalty to the country.
- Dong Liwu You as Xiao Niqiu, leader of the beggar children. Helps Wang Zhi in gathering intelligence.
- Tang Ziyue as Xiao Chizi, one of the beggar children. Helps Wang Zhi in gathering intelligence.
- Yu Yuan as Yu Zhengpeng, elder son of Yu family. A general. He hated Wang Zhi as he believed he caused the death of his father.
- Lin Xu as Yu Zhenglin, second son of Yu family. A minister. He tried to turn the citizens against Wang Zhi as he thought he killed his family.
- Yuan Qiao as Yu Xiulian, daughter of Yu family. She admires Sui Zhou, whom she was almost betrothed to (voiced by Yu Meng Ci).
- Chu Tianshu as Zhang Degui (Chef Zhang), chef of Yu family. He has a secret crush on Yu Xiulian and after failing to have his feelings reciprocated, killed the entire Yu family.
- Zhao Yang as Zhu Jianmou, a prince who often helps out the needy and is known as "Great Kind Person". However, he is actually a serial murderer who kills foreign young girls and dig out their heart, due to having been betrayed by his lover.
- Shi Damao as Qian Tai, a tea merchant who traffics children out of the capital.
- Lu Lin as He Lin, Tang Yu's abusive husband.
- Li Liqun as Ma Lin, the wealthiest merchant of Yunhe who is in charge of the silver mines. Subordinate of Li Zilong.
- Yang Huan as Li Mao, a scholar who is concerned about the welfare of mine workers (voiced by Wei Chao).
- Yang Tun as Ma Yuancong, Ma Lin's son.
- Ge Xingjia as Ma Rufu, housekeeper of Ma manor.
- Zhang Yue as Er Tao, leader of the mine workers in Yunhe.
- He Ziming as Li Fei, a former soldier. He impersonated Sui Zhou, using his name to rob the officials and distribute the money to the poor
- Yan Weiliang as Li You, Li Fei's younger brother.
- Hu Xiao as Sun Da, an official guarding the ice house.
- Li Yuanyuan as Jin Sanniang, seller of ice in the black market. Descendant of a family who helped build the palace's secret tunnels (voiced by Zhang Kai).
- Shu Yaxin as A'lasi / Ding Man, an Oirat spy sent to the palace as a eunuch. Duo'erla's lover.
- Jiang Feng as Gao Yi, an accomplished general who was captured by the Oirats while protecting the former Emperor.
- Jia Shuyi as Madame Gao, Gao Yi's wife.

== Soundtrack ==
No.	Title	Lyrics	Music	Singers	Length
1.	"Fire and Water (水火)" (Opening theme song)	Cui Shu	Zhao Jialin	Shu Linzuo
2.	"Mortal Realm (凡尘)" (Ending theme song)	Cui Shu	Zhao Jialin	Cui Zige & Xu Liang
3.	"Mortal Realm (凡尘)"	Cui Shu	Zhao Jialin	Darren Chen
4.	"Late at Night (夜阑珊)"			Darren Chen, Fu Meng-po & Liu Yaoyuan

== International broadcast ==
Network(s)/Station(s)	Series premiere		Title
China	iQIYI	April 1, 2020 - April 24, 2020 (Update 2 episodes every Wednesday to Friday at 20:00)	成化十四年 (电视剧) ( ; lit: )
Taiwan	IQIYI Taiwan Station	April 1, 2020 - April 24, 2020 (Update 2 episodes every Wednesday to Friday at 20:00)	成化十四年 (电视剧) ( ; lit: )
Thailand	True4U (24)	April 29, 2020 - October 8, 2020 (Every Wednesday and Thursday from 22.00 to 23.00)	รัชศกเฉิงฮว่าปีที่สิบสี่ ( ; lit: )
