= Count Your Lucky Stars =

2020 Chinese romantic comedy TV series

- Promotional poster
- Also known as: Exchange of Luck
- Simplified Chinese: 我好喜欢你
- Literal meaning: I Really Like You
- Hanyu Pinyin: Wǒ Hǎo Xǐ Huān Nǐ
- Genre: Romantic comedy
- Based on: 悠悠星辰 (交换吧! 运气) (The Exchange Luck) by Mo Xi (漠兮)
- Directed by: Lin Zi Ping
- Starring: Shen Yue; Jerry Yan
- Opening theme: "这就是爱情" [This Is Love] - Ya Dan Dan & Shen Chong Chong
- Ending theme: "我好喜欢你" [I Really Like You] - Jerry Yan & Shen Yue
- Country of origin: China
- Original language: Chinese
- No. of episodes: 34

Production
- Running time: 45 minutes
- Production company: Youku

Original release
- Network: Youku; Mango TV
- Release: August 3 – September 3, 2020

Count Your Lucky Stars (Chinese: 我好喜欢你; pinyin: Wǒ Hǎo Xǐ Huān Nǐ; lit. ''I Really Like You'') is a 2020 mainland Chinese television series starring Shen Yue and Jerry Yan. It airs on the video platform Youku and Mango TV between August 3, 2020 and September 3, 2020.

== Synopsis ==
Lu Xingcheng (Jerry Yan) is the editor-in-chief of a well-known magazine. Despite being known for being arrogant, Lu Xingcheng was already considered an expert in the world of fashion. Apart from that, he is also a very lucky man and is used to having everything he wants.

Meanwhile, Tong Xiaoyou (Shen Yue) is a less famous fashion designer and often experiences bad luck. Until one day, their fate was swapped in an instant because of an accidental kiss. Lu Xingcheng lost it all, whereas Tong Xiaoyou suddenly became famous.

== Cast ==
=== Main ===
- Shen Yue as Tong Xiaoyou
- Jerry Yan as Lu Xingcheng

=== Supporting ===
- Jackie Li as Song Ruru
- Miles Wei as Lu Yanzhi
- Shen Yao as Wen Xi
- Wang Sen as Mu Yang
- Li Yu Yang as Jiang Yan
- Yu Si Lu as Sarah Lin
- Eddie Cheung as Lu Ren
- Lily Tien as Cheng Pei Yu (Yan Zhi's mother)
- Kathy Chow as Ye Mang
