= The Love You Give Me (TV series) =

Chinese television series

- Promotional poster
- Simplified Chinese: 你给我的喜欢
- Hanyu Pinyin: Nǐ gěi wǒ de xǐhuān
- Genre: Romance; Comedy
- Based on: The Hope You Gave Me by Shi Dingrou
- Written by: Guo Shuang
- Directed by: Ding Yingzhou
- Starring: Wang Yuwen; Wang Ziqi; Cui Yixin; Li Chuan; Ma Xinrui
- Opening theme: Braving Love by Yu Jiayun
- Ending theme: I Always Love You by Curley Gao
- Country of origin: China
- Original language: Mandarin
- No. of seasons: 1
- No. of episodes: 28

Production
- Production locations: Shenzhen, China
- Running time: 45 minutes
- Production company: Tencent Pictures

Original release
- Network: Tencent Video
- Release: 24 April – 10 May 2023

The Love You Give Me (Chinese: 你给我的喜欢; pinyin: Nǐ gěi wǒ de xǐhuān) is a 2023 Chinese television drama starring Wang Yuwen and Wang Ziqi. It is based on the Chinese novel The Hope You Gave Me. The series aired on Tencent Video from April 24 until May 10, 2023. This series premiered in Russia in June 2023 on Okko. The series was commercial success in China and even bigger success in overseas.

== Synopsis ==
This drama is adapted from Shi Dingrou's novel of the same name. It tells the story of Min Hui (Wang Yuwen) and Xin Qi (Wang Ziqi), who fall in love but got separated due to a misunderstanding. Years later, they reunite and their sweet and torturous love story unfolds in both their professional and personal lives.

== Cast ==
=== Main ===
- Wang Yuwen as Min Hui

The R&D director of Bai'an Technology, at work, she is a smart and clear-headed R&D director, not only outstanding in work ability but also daring to confront and express her dissatisfaction when facing workplace harassment.

- Wang Ziqi as Xin Qi

He is the CEO of Bluejay Group, a young and promising entrepreneur. He has a congenital heart disease, is strong-willed, but has a soft heart deep down.

- Cui Yixin as Min Quanquan

Son of Xin Qi and Min Hui who also suffers from congenital heart disease.

=== Supporting ===
- Li Chuan as Zhou Ruji
- Ma Xinrui as Cao Mu
- Chen Xinhai as Chen Jiajun
- Li Xingyao as Yao Zizhu
- Kim Jin as Cheng Qirang
- Mei Baolai as Lin Xiyue
- Jill Hsu as Cindy
- Li Weilong as Hardy

== Production ==
=== Development ===
In November 2021, the drama was registered through filing.

On June 21, 2022, the series released an official poster and a group photo of the full cast. The following year, it was announced that the series will premiere on April 24, 2023.
