= Xiong Ziqi =

Chinese actor and singer (born 1992)

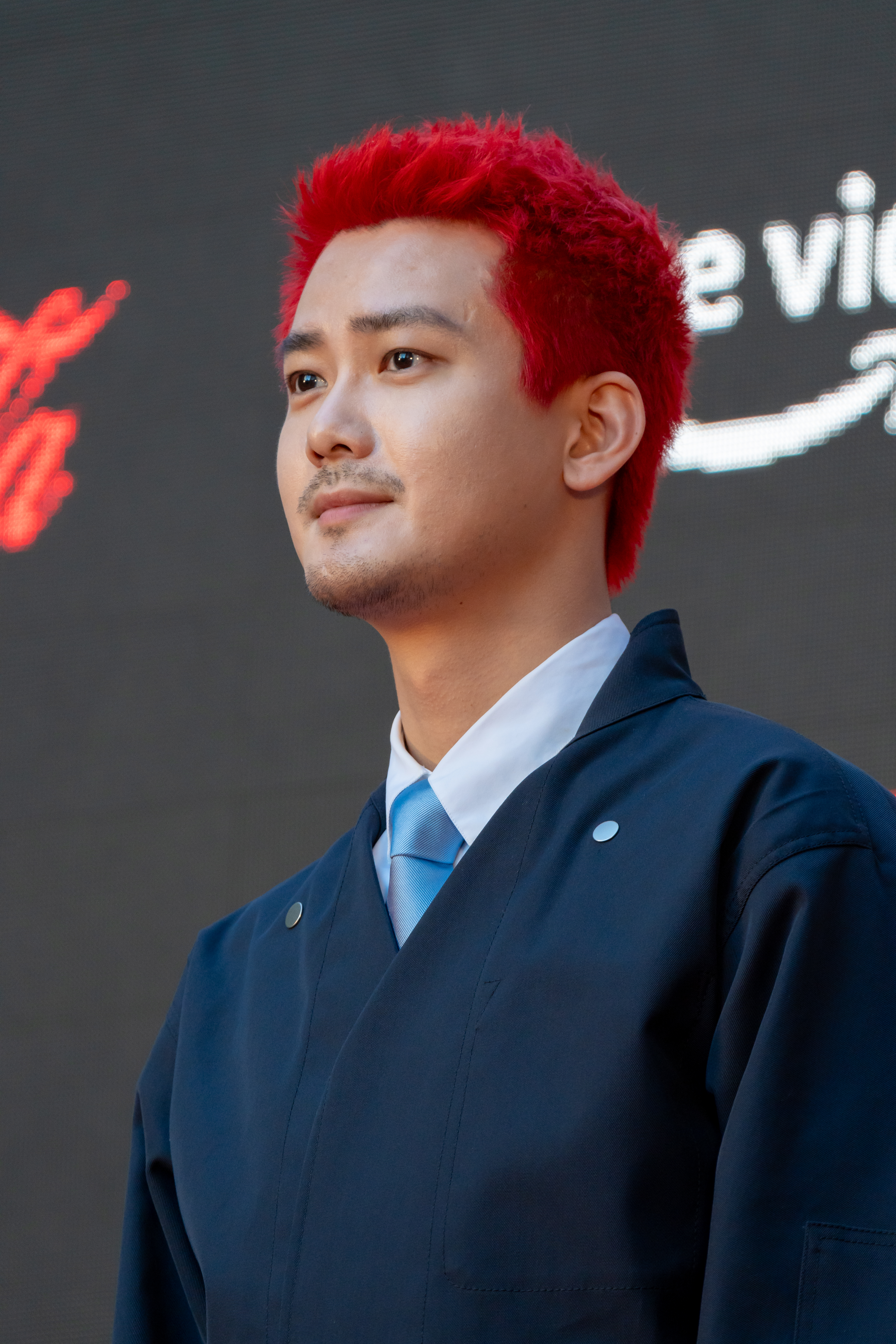
- Xiong in 2023
- Born: Xiong Ziqi; 6 June 1992 (age 34); Liaoning, China
- Other names: Dylan Xiong, Dylan
- Education: Shanghai Conservatory of Music
- Occupations: Actor; singer
- Years active: 2016–present
- Agent: Comic International Productions
- Height: 188 cm (6 ft 2 in)

Xiong Ziqi (Chinese: 熊梓淇, born 6 June 1992), known professionally as Dylan Xiong, is a Chinese actor and singer. He has been a member of Taiwanese boyband SpeXial since 2016.

== Biography ==
In 2012, Xiong participated in the recording of Meng Xiang He Chang Tuan, and became a member of Rainbow Chamber Singers. In 2013, Xiong served as a backup vocalist for the final episode of the reality program Chinese Idol. The same year, he participated in Hunan TV's singing competition Super Boy. In 2014, Xiong made his acting debut in the television series Lao Ba Tai Jiong.

In 2016, Xiong became a member of SpeXial and participated in the recording of their 4th album, Boyz On Fire. Along with several of his bandmates, he participated in the costume drama series Men with Sword and its sequel.

In 2017, Xiong starred in the youth sports television series, My Mr. Mermaid, wherein he received recognition for his acting skills. He also took on the lead role in the fantasy web drama Painting Heart Expert. The same year, he released his first solo album, Part One. Xiong was cast in the youth campus drama One and Another Him, as well as romance melodrama As Long As You Love Me.

In 2018, Xiong starred in the romantic comedy web drama Pretty Man. In 2019, Xiong starred in youth drama Another Me, based on Anni Baobei's novel of the same name.

== Filmography ==
=== Film ===
Year	English title	Chinese title	Role	Notes
2017	Super Firm	異能事務所之嗜血判官	Ye Yuwen	Web film
2018	Adventure in Tieling	鐵嶺風雲	Zhiming	Web film
2024	Snow Leopard	雪豹	Wang Xu	-Nominated at the 80th Venice International Film Festival (out of competition) -Nominated at the 2023 Toronto International Film Festival (out of competition) -Nominated at the 36th Tokyo International Film Festival (competition) and wins the Tokyo Grand Prix -Nominated at the 5th Hainan International Film Festival (competition) and wins the Golden Coconut Awards (Best Director) -Wins the Best Screenplay and Best Cinematography at the 17th Asian Film Awards -Wins the Golden Cyclo and the National Institute of Oriental Languages and Civilizations (INALCO) jury prize at the 30th Vesoul International Film Festival of Asian Cinema
2026	Crossing	四渡	Zhang Xueliang	
TBA	Under the Yellow Wall	黃墻之下		
TBA	As the River Goes By	水東游	Li Mingliang	Nominated at the 29th Busan International Film Festival

=== Television series ===
Year	English title	Chinese title	Role	Notes	Ref.
2014	Dad is Too Jealous	老爸太囧	Yang Wenbo		
2016	The Ultimate Ranger	终极游侠	Lan Bo		
2016	Men with Sword	刺客列传	Zhong Kunyi		
2017	The Legendary School: Three Lives Three Worlds	学院传说之三生三世桃花缘	Liu Yun		
2017	Painting Heart Expert	画心师	Ning Weiyu		
2017	Men with Sword 2	刺客列传之龙血玄黄	Zhong Kunyi		
2017	My Mr. Mermaid	浪花一朵朵	Tang Yibai		
2018	Pretty Man	国民老公	Lu Jinnian		
2018	One and Another Him	我和两个TA	Xiao En		
2018	Hi, I'm Saori	我的保姆手册	Robot No. 685	Cameo	
2019	Young Blood Agency	民国少年侦探社	Tong Lichuan	Guest appearance	
2019	Another Me	七月与安生	Su Jiaming		
2019	Pretty Man 2	国民老公2	Lu Jinnian		
2020	As Long As You Love Me	爱情的开关	Zhou Yanzhao		
2020	Legend of Awakening	天醒之路	Yan Xifan		
2021	Litter to Glitter	燃烧吧！废柴！	Hu Yanzu		
2022	The Bachelors	追爱家族	Qi Tian		
2023	Prosecution Elite	公诉	Zhang Xiaobei		
2023	White Castle	白色城堡	Liu Fei		
2025	Love is Always Online	对的时间对的人	Jiang Anlan		

=== Variety shows ===
Year	English title	Chinese title	Role	Network	Notes/Ref.
2017	Mars Laboratory	火星研究院第一季	Cast member	Youku	
2018	Twenty-Four Hours	二十四小时第三季	Cast member	Zhejiang TV	
2020	—N/a	爆款來了第二季	Cast member	Youku	
2020	—N/a	笑起來真好看	Contestant	Hunan Television	
2020	—N/a	寶藏般的鄉村	Cast member	Zhejiang TV	
2021	Top Funny Comedian: Season 7	歡樂喜劇人第七季	Contestant	Dragon Television	
2024	Call Me By Fire Season 4	披荊斬棘第四季	Contestant	Mango TV	

== Discography ==
=== Albums ===
Year	English title	Chinese title	Notes/Ref.
2017	Part One	—N/a	
2019	All New Xiong Ziqi	全析 熊梓淇	
2022	Good Night&Goodbye	—N/a	
2023	29.9	—N/a	

=== Singles ===
Year	English title	Chinese title	Album	Notes/Ref.
2016	"Sword Flying Heart"	劍心飛揚	Men with Sword OST	with Evan
2016	"Moonlight Strategy"	月光訣	Men with Sword OST	
2017	"Painter"	畫師	Painting Heart Expert OST	
2017	"Risk Taker"	冒險家		
2017	"Hero"	英雄	Men with Sword 2 OST	with various artists
2017		戰火荒煙	Men with Sword 2 OST	
2017	"Broken Tears"	破淚	Men with Sword 2 OST	
2017	"Loving You in a Good Weather"	愛上你的好天氣	My Mr. Mermaid OST	with Tan Songyun
2017	"Just Scream Loudly Like This"	就這樣大聲吶喊吧	My Mr. Mermaid OST	
2017	"Super Hero"		My Mr. Mermaid OST	
2017	"What Is This"	什麼鬼	Goldbuster OST	with PAPI and Sandra Ng
2018	'Say I Love You "	說愛你	Pretty Man OST	
2018	"Not a Rash Act"	不是冲动	Pretty Man OST	with Li Xirui
2018		我不聊生	Pretty Man OST	with Wu Zhixuan
2018	"KO"	—N/a		Theme song of The King of Fighters Destiny (拳皇命運)
2018	"Fight for You"		Hi, I'm Saori OST	
2018	"The Future Me"	未来已来		
2019	"Noise"	闹	Young Blood Agency OST	
2019	"The Moon Represents My Heart"	月亮代表我的心	Boundless Love OST	
2019	"Blame me for my good memory"	都怪我記性太好	Pretty Man 2 OST	
2019	"Only Want To Be With You"	只想跟你在一起	Pretty Man 2 OST	with Lai Yumeng
2019	"My Motherland and I"	我和我的祖国	Qing Chun Wei Zu Guo Er Chang	
2020	"Parallel Love"	平行爱情	As Long As You Love Me OST	
2021	"Millennium"	諾信千年	Guardians of the Tomb OST	
2021	"Unstoppable"	勢不可擋		
2022	"Bu Wei"	不畏		
2022	"Bian Yuan Ren Wu"	边缘人物	The Bachelors OST	
2023	"The Chasing Light"	逐光		
2023	"Xin Men"	心门	White Castle OST	

== Musical ==
Year	Production	Role
2023	Moon Man The Musical (独行月球)	Du Gu Yue (独孤月)

== Awards and nominations ==
Year	Event	Category	Nominated work	Result	Ref.
2017	Kugou Music Awards	Most Popular New Generation Artist	—N/a	Won	
2017	17th Top Chinese Music Awards	New Force Idol	—N/a	Won	
2017	Tencent Video Star Awards	New Male Artist of the Year	—N/a	Won	
2017	Toutiao Annual Awards Ceremony	Douyin Star of the Year	—N/a	Won	
2018	2018 INSTYLE ICON AWARDS	Most Personalised Idol of the Year	—N/a	Won	
2018	2018 INSTYLE ICON AWARDS	Most Popular Idol of the Year	—N/a	Won	
2018	2018 OnlyLady Feng Shang Awards	Most Appealing Idol of the Year	—N/a	Won	
2018	2018 Asian Music Festival	Annual Leap Award	—N/a	Won	
2018	15th Esquire Man At His Best Awards	Variety Star of the Year	—N/a	Won	
2019	Golden Bud – The Third Network Film And Television Festival	Most Popular Actor	—N/a	Won	
2019	2019 iFeng Fashion Choice Awards	Fashion Elegance of the Year	—N/a	Won	
2019	16th Esquire Man At His Best Awards	Charity Ambassador of the Year	—N/a	Won	
2020	2020 iFeng Fashion Choice Awards	Fashion Excellence Actor of the Year	—N/a	Won	
2020	17th Esquire Man At His Best Awards	Young Power Of The Year	—N/a	Won	
