= The Inn (TV program) =

- Title card
- Traditional Chinese: 親愛的·客棧
- Simplified Chinese: 亲爱的·客栈
- Hanyu Pinyin: Qīnàide Kèzhàn
- Genre: Reality show
- Showrunner: Chen Xinyu
- Written by: Mengnan Chu
- Directed by: Chen Xinyu, Mengnan Chu
- Starring: See below
- Ending theme: "Dear You" by Chen Li (Season 1) "September's September" by Elvis Wang (Season 2)
- Country of origin: China
- Original language: Chinese
- No. of seasons: 3
- No. of episodes: 38

Production
- Production locations: Lugu Lake Scenic Area, Sichuan, China (Season 1), Arxan, Mongolia (Season 2), Ningxia(Season 3)
- Camera setup: Multicamera setup
- Running time: 90 minutes
- Production company: Hunan Broadcasting System

Original release
- Network: Hunan Television
- Release: 7 October 2017 – 2018

The Inn (Chinese: 亲爱的·客栈) is a Chinese variety show aired on Hunan Broadcasting Station. In the variety show, a couple will manage an inn with a company of friends as guest for 20 days. The Inn shared the same production team with another variety show by Hunan Broadcasting System, Divas Hits The Road.

== Content ==
The Inn focuses on the hospitality of two innocent couples towards their friends (guest) who spent 20 days running the inn together, and opening up to each other by sharing stories of their lives and their own past. On certain episodes, the production team invites mysterious guests as "volunteers" and the former will work together with the five "masters" in the show. Once guests have checked into the inn, the production team will give each of them a star, and guests will vote for one of their favorite employees from among the three at the end of their stay. In season 2, the only difference is the cast & new location of Arxan Mongolia.

== Production ==
The Inn was successfully proposed on August 3, 2017, and the site of recording was confirmed on August 18. On September 10, principal photography started at the Lugu Lake Scenic Area of Liangshan in Sichuan Province. Filming was completed on September 30, with duration that took less than two months to be completed. The show broadcast was the succeeder for the time slot for "Chinese Restaurant" on Hunan Broadcasting System, and broadcast every Saturday at 22:00 since October 7, 2017.

The production team employed a surveillance photography-based approach whereby the team installed 72 monitoring booths and another 16 motorized hidden cameras around the inn. Production team for The Inn doesn't provide the cast members with clear-cut instructions and missions, resulting in a largely unscripted show. The production team adopted a 24-hour non-interference shooting mode, recording all the details of the cast members. The staff carries out a 24-hour shift system, with an average of about 17–18 hours per person per day.

== Cast ==
=== Boss and Lady Boss ===
Name	Relationship	Birth Date	Occupation	Role designated
Wang Ke	Husband & Wife	November 3, 1980	Businessman	Boss
Liu Tao	Husband & Wife	July 12, 1978	Actress, singer	Proprietress

=== Season 1 ===
Name	Relationship	Birth Date	Occupation	Role designated
Ji Lingchen	Couple	July 15, 1993	Model, actor	First segment: Staff Second segment: Butler to Room 102
Kan Qingzi	Couple	April 15, 1988	Actress	First segment: Staff Second segment: Butler to Room 102
Chen Xiang	Friend	December 13, 1989	Singer, actor	First segment: Chief butler Second segment: Butler to Room 101
Jackson Yee	Friend	November 28, 2000	Actor	N/A
Yang Zi	Friend	November 6, 1992	Actress	N/A
Pei-Pei Cheng	Friend	Jan 6, 1946	Actress	N/A

=== Season 2 ===
- Wu Yi
- Shen Yue
- Kido Ma
- Dylan Wang
- Zheng Xiaolin
- Zhang Yunfeng
- Zheng Xiaoli
- Caesar Wu
- Yang Zi
- Cheng Xiao

=== Season 3 ===
- Hans Zhang
- Leo Wu
- Ruby Lin
- Li Landi
- Chen Xiang
- Ma Tianyu

== Dishes ==
- Sweet and sour lemon fish: 首先制作酱料
- Potato Smoked Chicken
- Curry Chicken Wing
- Braised chicken feet
- Red Wine Pork Rib
- Braised Fish
- Matsutake Coq au vin Chicken
- Chopped chilli pepper fish head
- Dried tomato chicken wing
- Golden Triangle Tofu
- Fried rice
- Sesame cookie

== Staff with the most stars ==
Name	Stars
Adi Kan	8
Ji Lingchen	5
Chen Xiang	6

== Guests ==
=== Season 1 ===
- Jackson Yee (Episode 1–3)
- Yang Zi (Episode 5–7)
- Li Fei'er, Yuan Zihui, Cheng Pei-pei (Episode 7–8)

=== Season 2 ===
- Myolie Wu (Episode 1–2)
- Chen Xiang (Episode 3)
- Shen Yue (Episode 4–7, before being converted to permanent cast)
- Tengger (Episode 5–6)
- Yang Zi, Qiao Xin (Episode 6–7)
- Jiang Zixin (Episode 8–9)
- Chen Long, Zhang Lingzhi (Episode 9–10)
- Li Xinjie, Cheng Xiao (Episode 10)
- Li Weijia, Caesar Wu, Li Xinran (Episode 11–12)
- Wang Ziwen (Episode 12)
- Mao Buyi (Episode 12–13)

=== Season 3 ===
- Li Xiaoran (Episode 4)
- Qin Hailu (Episode 7–8)
- Lai Kuan-lin, Veronique Zheng (Episode 8–9)
- Jiao Junyan (Episode 9–10)
- Zhang Xueying. Jiang Yiyi (Episode 10–11)
- Wang Ke (Episode 12)
