= Lily Tien =

Taiwanese actress

- Born: 30 April 1967 (age 59); Chiayi, Taiwan
- Occupation: Actress

Lily Tien (Chinese: 田麗; born 30 April 1967) is a Taiwanese actress. She was named the Best Actress at the 2002 Golden Bell Awards.

In a 2016 interview with Apple Daily, Tien denounced model Lin Chi-ling for allegedly supporting the Taiwan independence movement, reiterating accusations she had made on social media. Noting that her family supporting Taiwan's Democratic Progressive Party, she called for Lin to openly denounce Taiwan independence.

== Selected filmography ==
=== Television ===
- Count Your Lucky Stars (2020)
- My Amazing Boyfriend 2 (2019)
- An Oriental Odessey (2018)
- My Amazing Boyfriend (2016)
- The Princess Weiyoung (2016)
- Princess of Lan Ling King (2016)
- Fabulous Boys (2013)
- The Bride with White Hair (2012)
- Angel Lover (2006)
- Wind and Cloud (2002)
