= Hidden Strike =

2023 action film by Scott Waugh

- Promotional poster
- 狂怒沙暴
- Directed by: Scott Waugh
- Written by: Arash Amel
- Produced by: Esmond Ren; Hans Canosa; Jackie Chan; Joe Tam
- Starring: Jackie Chan; John Cena; Pilou Asbæk; Ma Chunrui
- Cinematography: Tony Cheung
- Edited by: Scott Waugh
- Music by: Nathan Furst
- Production companies: Changchun Film Studio: XYZ Films; Huaxia Film Distribution; Epitome; Talent International Media; Flame Pictures Company
- Distributed by: XYZ Films (United States); Netflix (Note: Not a Netflix original) (International)
- Release dates: 6 July 2023 (United Arab Emirates); 28 July 2023 (United States)
- Running time: 103 minutes
- Countries: China; United States
- Languages: Mandarin; English
- Budget: $80 million
- Box office: $981,505

Hidden Strike (also known as Project X-Traction in some markets) is a 2023 action-adventure film directed and edited by Scott Waugh and written by Arash Amel. The film stars Jackie Chan, John Cena, Ma Chunrui, and Pilou Asbæk.

Hidden Strike was released on 6 July 2023 in the United Arab Emirates and then it was released on 28 July 2023 in the United States and internationally via Netflix. It received negative reviews from critics and underperformed at the box office, grossing $981,505 against a budget of $80 million from a limited theatrical release. However, the film became the most viewed on Netflix worldwide in its launch weekend, charting as the number 1 movie in the U.S. and 53 other countries, and was the sixth most watched movie globally on Netflix in 2023.

== Plot ==
An oil refinery in Iraq owned by Chinese firm Unicorp is frequently attacked by mercenaries led by Owen Paddock, an ex-special forces soldier, leading to its closure. "Dragon" Luo Feng leads his private security company in evacuating the civilian employees, including chief engineer Professor Chang, her son, and Feng's estranged daughter Mei, in a convoy consisting of eleven buses along the Highway of Death to the safety of the Green Zone.

Meanwhile, needing money to fix a well in a rural village, former US Marine Chris Van Horne reluctantly joins his mercenary brother, Henry in attacking the convoy for Owen, in the belief they are tracking down a man responsible for attacking them years earlier. The mercenaries create a massive sandstorm by using a truck with a jet engine to cover their attack, in which they board and take two of the buses. After Feng's team clears the sandstorm, Feng discovers the buses missing. Tracking them down, he finds most of the evacuees safe but discovers five are missing, including Professor Chang and her son, who have been kidnapped by Owen.

Realizing he had helped kidnap civilians, Chris confronts Henry and Owen, with the latter telling him that he intends to make Professor Chang reactivate the refinery and take the oil for himself as compensation for years of unrewarded work. After an enraged Chris leaves, Owen shoots Henry for failing to stop Feng; Chris later discovers Henry's body and vows to stop Owen. Feng tracks down Chris and confronts him, but they are ambushed by French mercenaries sent by Owen whom they fight off together. Realizing they now have a common enemy, Feng and Chris return to the village where Feng learns that Chris took on the job to help the children of the village, while Chris learns that Feng's estrangement with Mei is due to him being on a mission when her mother died. After Chris and Feng entertain the village children, Feng patches up his relationship with Mei.

After Owen scares Professor Chang into cooperating by killing one of the hostages and threatening her son, he sends his men to find her notebook containing the codes to restart the refinery, which Chris accidentally took with him earlier. They infiltrate the village but Chris and Feng fight them off before they are cornered by Owen who threatens the village's residents. Chris gives up the notebook in order to protect the village.

Chris, Feng and Mei head to the refinery but not before Owen is able to restart production, intending to transport the oil in a convoy of fuel trucks to a waiting oil tanker. He leaves in an ATV with the trucks just as Chris and Feng assault the refinery, with Chris and Mei pursuing Owen while Feng stays behind to rescue Professor Chang and her son. After Feng catches up to them in the jet truck, they use the vehicle to destroy the convoy of fuel trucks in a chain reaction of collisions before pushing Owen's ATV off a cliff to his death. Feng, Mei and Chris manage to jump to safety.

While the trio are rescued, the crew on the oil tanker are arrested. At the village, Chris and Feng fix the well and are informed of a new mission in which Feng offers Chris to join. Chris accepts the offer, setting off on a new adventure.

== Cast ==
- Jackie Chan as "Dragon" Luo Feng (Note: Although these characters were reported to have the last name "Feng", they are listed in the end credits as "Dragon Luo" and "Mei", respectively.)
- John Cena as Chris Van Horne (Note: Although these characters were reported to have the last name "Van Horne", they are listed in the end credits as "Chris" and "Henry", respectively.)
- Wenli Jiang as Professor Chang
- Pilou Asbæk as Owen Paddock (Note: Although his character was reported to have the first name "Owen", he is listed in the end credits as "Paddock".)
- Ma Chunrui as Luo Mei
- Amadeus Serafini as Henry Van Horne
- Hany Adel as Captain Azir
- Laila Ezz EL-Arab as Soraya
- Jia Xiu as Shen Wei
- Rima Zeidan as Li Yan
- Ernest Manson as Morgan
- Zhenwei Wang as Xiao Wei
- Simon Gong Jun as Hai Ming
- Tim Man as Knox
- Rachael Holoway as "Tomb Raider"
- Hou Minghao as Assistant Ning
- Max Huang as a mercenary

== Production ==
The movie was originally planned as a collaboration between Jackie Chan and Sylvester Stallone, but Stallone backed out and was replaced by John Cena. It was filmed in 2018, with locations in China standing in for the Middle East. From July to November 2018, Cena lived in Yinchuan, China, in order to work with Chan on the film.

The film had been known under several potential titles including Ex-Baghdad, Project X, Project X-Traction, and SNAFU before settling on Hidden Strike.

== Release ==
A trailer for the film was released on 30 May 2023.

The film was released theatrically on 6 July 2023, in the United Arab Emirates and select international markets, and on 28 July 2023, in the United States and internationally on Netflix. The film became the most viewed on Netflix worldwide in its launch weekend, charting as the number 1 movie in the U.S. and 53 other countries, without any promotion from the platform. It remained as the U.S. and global number 1 movie on Netflix for 2 weeks, registering 56.8 million views worldwide in its first 28 days of release. It was the sixth most watched movie globally on Netflix in 2023

== Reception ==
Rotten Tomatoes, a review aggregator, reports that 24% of 17 surveyed critics gave the film a positive review.

Chase Hutchinson of Collider gave the film a 'D' grade, criticizing the plot, action and overuse of computer generated effects, and the lack of chemistry between Chan and Cena. James Marsh of the South China Morning Post, who gave the film 1 out of 5 stars, also noted the lack of chemistry between the two stars, and said the story was "a tired, by-the-numbers affair" with "underwhelming" action.

Other critics gave more favorable reviews. Si Jia of Geek Culture gave the film 6.1 out of 10 and wrote "Come for the action, stay for the delightful chemistry between Chan and Cena – but not much else. While Hidden Strike has its fair share of charm, it’s ultimately a forgettable jaunt that serves as sheer popcorn entertainment, and will likely become a distant memory a few months down the road." Neil Soans of The Times of India gave 3 out of 5 stars and wrote "Neither star is expendable because of their sheer drawing power, but that’s expected from such a celeb-driven blockbuster that’s likely to lead to a sequel if this one does well enough. A brain-dead yet amusing flick, Hidden Strike makes the most of Chan and Cena’s abilities to entertain on-screen."
