= Ma Xinrui =

Chinese actress and model

- Born: 5 February 1994 (age 32); Tianshui, Gansu, China
- Education: Shanghai Theatre Academy
- Occupations: Actress, Model
- Years active: 2013–present

Chinese name
- Simplified Chinese: 马心瑞
Transcriptions
Standard Mandarin
- Hanyu Pinyin: Mǎ XīnRuì

Birth name
- Simplified Chinese: 马春瑞
Transcriptions
Standard Mandarin
- Hanyu Pinyin: Mǎ ChūnRuì

Ma Xinrui (Chinese: 马心瑞, born 5 February 1994), formerly known as Ma Chunrui, is a Chinese actress and model. In 2013, she won the China division championship of the Miss Bikini of the Universe. She is known for her role in Love O2O and Hidden Strike.

== Filmography ==
=== Television series ===
Year	English title	Chinese title	Role	Notes/Ref.
2016	Love O2O	微微一笑很倾城	Mang Yiran	
2017	Lost Love in Times	醉玲珑	Mingyan	
2018	Beautiful Trainee	美丽见习生	Jin Meili	
2019	Return the World to You	归还世界给你	Yin Wei	
2020	Still Not Enough	还没爱够	Fang Hanyu	
2021	Shining Like You	而你刚好发光	Bai Qiao	
2023	The Love You Give Me	你给我的喜欢	Cao Mu	

=== Film ===
Year	English title	Chinese title	Role	Notes/Ref.
2022		大话西游之缘起	Zixia	
2023	Hidden Strike	狂怒沙暴	Mei	
