= Wang Ziqi =

Chinese actor (born 1996)

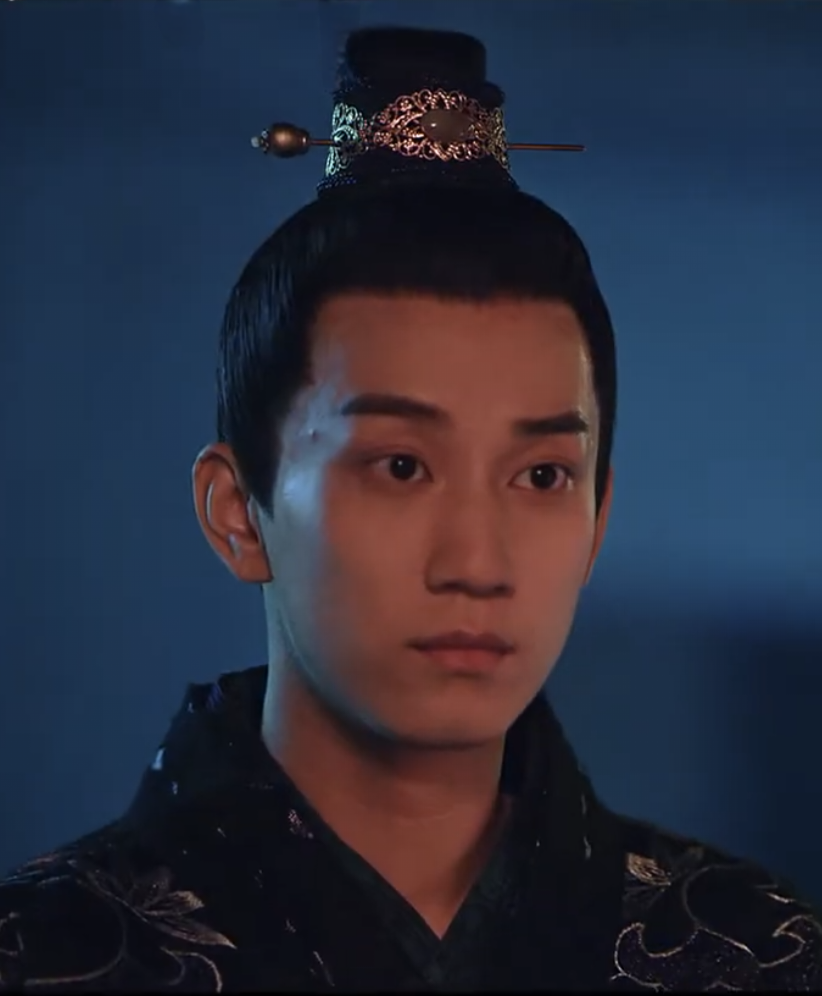
- Wang in The Imperial Coroner (2021)
- Born: February 25, 1996 (age 30); Huzhou, Zhejiang, China
- Education: Beijing Film Academy
- Occupation: Actor
- Years active: 2018–present
- Height: 185 cm (6 ft 1 in)

Chinese name
- Simplified Chinese: 王子奇
- Hanyu Pinyin: Wáng Zǐqí

Wang Ziqi (Chinese: 王子奇, born February 25, 1996) is a Chinese actor. He is best known for his role as Xin Qi in the television series The Love You Give Me (2023), which gave him international recognition. He is also well known for his roles in The Imperial Coroner (2021), Once We Get Married (2021), Chase the Truth (2023), and Guess Who I Am (2024).

== Filmography ==
=== Television series ===
Year	Title	Role	Notes	Ref.
2018	Love is in the Air	Fang Muye		
2020	Novoland: The Castle in the Sky 2	Yun Muyang		
2021	The Imperial Coroner	Xiao Jinyu		
2021	Once We Get Married	Yin Sichen		
2023	The Love You Give Me	Xin Qi		
2023	The Longest Promise	Qing Gang		
2023	Winter and Lion	Wu Wanli		
2023	Bright Eyes in the Dark	Lou Mingye		
2023	Chase the Truth	Chu Yihan		
2024	Guess Who I Am	Qin Hao / Ji Chengchuan		
2024	The First Shot	Gu Yiran		
2025	The Embers	Liao Siyuan		
2025	Serendipity	Lu Shang		
2026	The Imperial Coroner 2	Xiao Jinyu		
TBA	We Are the Future	Zhou Tianyu		
TBA	Red Dance Shoes	Ma Xiaodong		

== Awards and nominations ==
Year	Award	Category	Nominee(s)/Work(s)	Result	Ref.
2023	Tencent Video Star Awards	Promising Actor of the Year	Wang Ziqi	Won	
2024	Tencent Video Star Awards	Breakthrough Television Actor of the Year	Wang Ziqi	Won	
