= Meteor Garden (2018 TV series) =

2018 Chinese television series

- Promotional poster
- Genre: Romantic comedy
- Based on: Boys Over Flowers (花より男子, Hana Yori Dango), Meteor Garden
- Written by: Sharon Mao
- Directed by: Lin Helong
- Starring: Shen Yue; Dylan Wang; Darren Chen; Caesar Wu; Connor Leong
- Opening theme: "For You" by Dylan Wang (王鹤棣), Darren Chen (官鸿), Caesar Wu (吴希泽), Connor Leong (梁靖康)
- Ending theme: "Love Exists" (爱，存在) by Kiki Wei (魏奇奇)
- Country of origin: China
- Original language: Mandarin
- No. of seasons: 1
- No. of episodes: 49 (Netflix / DVD Version); 50 (TV Version); 100 (ABS-CBN)

Production
- Producers: Angie Chai, Mika Nakamura
- Production locations: Shanghai, China; London, United Kingdom
- Camera setup: Multiple-camera
- Running time: 45 minutes 25–30 minutes (ABS-CBN)
- Production companies: Star Ritz; Mango Entertainment; Edko Films
- Budget: $33 million

Original release
- Network: Hunan Television
- Release: July 9 – August 29, 2018

Related
- Boys Over Flowers "Hana Yori Dango" (1992-2004 manga, 1996 anime, 1997 animated film; Japan); Hana Yori Dango (1995 film, Japan); Meteor Garden (2001, Taiwan); Meteor Garden II (2002, Taiwan); Hana Yori Dango (2005, Japan); Hana Yori Dango Returns (2007, Japan); Hana Yori Dango Final (2008, Japan); Boys Over Flowers (2009, South Korea); Hana Nochi Hare: HanaDan Next Season (2018, Japan); F4 Thailand: Boys Over Flowers (2021, Thailand)

Meteor Garden (Chinese: 流星花园; pinyin: Liúxīng Huāyuán) is a 2018 mainland Chinese television series starring Shen Yue, Dylan Wang, Darren Chen, Caesar Wu, and Connor Leong. The series is based on the Japanese manga series Boys Over Flowers (花より男子, Hana Yori Dango) written by Yoko Kamio, and a remake of the 2001 Taiwanese series of the same name. The series is produced by the maker of the original Taiwanese series Angie Chai, with Mika Nakamura participating as the Japanese-side producer, and directed by Lin Helong. It is set in Shanghai and London.

The series reboot was first broadcast in China on Hunan Television, then made available after its airing to VIP users of its streaming counterpart, Mango TV. The stream was then made available to everyone the day after it aired. Two episodes were released per day on a Monday to Wednesday basis. It was also available globally via Netflix from October 2018 through December 2024.

== Plot ==
The story centers around an ordinary girl, Dong Shancai (Shen Yue), who is accepted into the most prestigious university in the country, Ming De University. Shancai is a girl from a family that barely makes ends meet. Due to her strong sense of fairness and the nature of her personality, she immediately clashes with F4, an elite clique composed of the four most popular boys in the institution, especially its spoiled, rich and arrogant leader – Daoming Si (Dylan Wang). Gradually, Daoming Si falls deeply in love with Shancai, only to realize that she is in love with one of his best friends, Huaze Lei (Darren Chen).

Eventually, the four boys begin to acknowledge Shancai's unyielding personality that is like her namesake: a weed that can never be destroyed. Shancai begins to see the good in the boys, paving the way for friendships and an eventual romance. However, Daoming Si's mother strongly disapproves of Shancai due to her social status and family background, thus the former doing all things in order to break Shancai and Daoming Si's relationship.

== Cast ==
=== Main ===
Actor	Character Names	Manga Character	Characteristics
Shen Yue	Dong Shancai 董杉菜	Tsukushi Makino	The protagonist of the story. A freshman at Ming De University's Department of Food Science & Nutrition. She also works part-time at a bubble tea shop with her best friend, Xiaoyou. Shancai is a strong-willed, compassionate and bold girl who doesn't allow herself or others to be bullied. After angering Daoming Si, she receives the sacred 'Joker' card from F4, challenging her to a match of Contract bridge. Initially, she likes Huaze Lei, a member of F4. However, after a series of events, Shancai is moved by Daoming Si's sincerity and starts developing feelings for him. Due to her fearless and loyal nature, she soon earns the respect of the F4 boys and becomes good friends with them. She is later stuck in a love triangle between Daoming Si and Huaze Lei.
Dylan Wang	Daoming Si 道明寺	Tsukasa Dōmyōji	The stubborn, hot-headed and arrogant leader of F4. Daoming Si is a senior at Ming De University's Department of Business Management. He comes from a wealthy and domineering family, and is being primed to take over the family's multinational corporation, Daoming Group. He took an interest in finance and earned his 1st million on the online stock market by the age of 18. He never fully matured, as his parents were absent for much of his life – his father died when he was in high school and hence, his mother was often busy overseas leading Daoming Group. At the beginning of the series, Daoming Si is spoiled, entitled and short-tempered, getting angry easily when something doesn't go his way. However, after an altercation with Shancai, he becomes smitten with her due to her defiant stance to his bullying ways. He strives to protect Shancai at all costs and is willing to go to extreme ends to keep her safe as he has fallen in love with her.
Darren Chen / Guan Hong	Huaze Lei 花泽类	Rui Hanazawa	The talented and quiet member of F4. Huaze Lei is a senior at Ming De University's Department of Music, unlike the other 3 members of F4 who all study business. Also from a wealthy family, Huaze Lei has been friends with Daoming Si since they were young children. He is in love with his childhood friend, Teng Tangjing, who befriended him from a young age despite his quiet and withdrawn demeanour (due to his mild autism spectrum disorder). On the exterior, Huaze Lei appears cold, quiet, and indifferent to those outside his circle of friends. He later develops feelings for Shancai.
Caesar Wu / Wu Xize	Ximen Yan 西门彦	Sōjirō Nishikado	The playboy member of F4. Ximen is a senior at Ming De University's Department of Business Management, and an expert in tea culture. He is also a charming and prolific playboy, due to scars from his parents' failed relationship, his father's infidelity and an unresolved past with his first love. He later expresses interest in Shancai's best friend, Xiaoyou.
Connor Leong / Liang Jingkang	Feng Meizuo 冯美作	Akira Mimasaka	The mood-maker member of F4. Meizuo is a senior at Ming De University's Department of Business Management. He is lighthearted, enjoys making jokes, and has an incredible memory. Like Ximen, he is a flirtatious casanova. He expresses interest in Dong Shancai's impressive competitor in the Chinese Cuisine competition, Zhou Caina, who he dates for a while before letting her go to her true love.

=== Supporting ===
- Wang Lin 王琳 as Daoming Feng 道明枫
- Dee Hsu as Daoming Zhuang 道明莊
- Li Jiaqi 厉嘉琪 as Jiang Xiaoyou 蒋小优
- Liu Yinhao 刘尹昊 as Chen Qinghe 陈青和
- Dong Xin 董馨 as Li Zhen 李真
- Sun Qian 孙千 as He Yuanzi 何原姿 (小姿）
- Lin Peng 林鹏 as Dong Danian 董大年 – Shancai's father
- Zhang Li 张莉 as Shancai's mother
- Sun Yihan 孙伊涵 as Tengtang Jing 腾唐静
- Wang Runze 王润泽 as Tian Ye 田野
- Blake Abbie as Thomas 托马斯
- Wang Yunhua 王韵华 as Jiang Baihe 江百合
- An Ziyi 安紫依 as Li Xinhui 李心惠
- Yang Guang 杨光 as Yu Sao 玉嫂
- Liu Ye 刘烨 as Zhou Caina 周彩娜
- Wang Dong 王东 as Ye Mingchuan 叶明川
- Zhao Huaran 赵奂然 as Yan Shunping 颜舜平
- Jin Haochen 金澔辰 as Yan Zhibu 颜之步
- Dai Yaqi 戴雅琪 as Geng Yifen 耿怡芬 (小更)
- Cai Huiquan 蔡慧泉 as Young Dong Shancai 董杉菜（童年）
- Liu Huanhua 刘画画 as Young Daoming Si 道明寺（童年）
- Zhang Bowen 张博文 as Young HuaZe Lei 花泽类（童年）
- Bei Jiaxin 裴佳欣 as Young Tengtang Jing 腾唐静（童年）

=== Cameo ===
- Harlem Yu
- Amber Kuo
- Tang Jingmei
- Wang Yue 王月 as Sister Yue 月姐

== Production ==
In April 2017, Angie Chai announced the remake of Meteor Garden, which she produced in 2001. Prior to the announcement, Barbie Hsu hinted at the news on her Weibo account. Chai planned on making the remake a "fuller —and flashier— adaptation of the books". The drama was budgeted at 720 million New Taiwan dollars (about US$24 million) with 15 million per episode, thirty times higher than the original.

A casting call was announced on social media on June 21, 2017, with a video and the topic, "#FindingF4". On November 7, 2017, the actors playing F4 were revealed, namely Dylan Wang (Daoming Si), Darren Chen (Huaze Lei), Caesar Wu (Ximen Yan) and Connor Leong (Feng Meizuo). Shen Yue's role as Dong Shancai was unveiled at a press conference in Shanghai on November 9.

Dee Hsu auditioned for the role of Daoming Feng and was cast as Daoming Zhuang. The role of Daoming Feng was eventually portrayed by actress Wang Lin (Lilian Wang).

In February 2018, it was announced that the director had been changed from Xu Fuxiang to Lin Helong.

== Original soundtrack ==
No.	Title	Singer	Length
1.	"你要的爱 [深夜版] (The Love You Want [Night Version])"	戴佩妮 (Penny Tai)	04:21
2.	"For You"	王鹤棣 (Dylan Wang), 官鸿 (Darren Chen), 吴希泽 (Caesar Wu), 梁靖康 (Connor Leong)	03:32
3.	"等一个人 (Waiting For Someone)"	林芯仪(Shennio Lin)	04:21
4.	"流星雨 (Meteor Shower)"	F4	04:34
5.	"创造回忆 (Creating Memories)"	王鹤棣 (Dylan Wang), 官鸿 (Darren Chen), 吴希泽 (Caesar Wu), 梁靖康 (Connor Leong)	05:17
6.	"从来没想到 (Never Thought Of)"	王鹤棣 (Dylan Wang), 官鸿 (Darren Chen), 吴希泽 (Caesar Wu), 梁靖康 (Connor Leong)	03:41
7.	"想都不用想 (Don't Even Have to Think About It)"	王鹤棣 (Dylan Wang)	04:03
8.	"非同小可(Extremely Important)"	王鹤棣 (Dylan Wang)	02:51
9.	"花背后的温柔(The Tenderness Behind The Flower)"	官鸿 (Darren Chen)	03:53
10.	"星星数流星(Stars Counting Shooting Stars)"	梁靖康 (Connor Leong)	03:28
11.	"想你想到快疯了(Going Crazy Thinking About You)"	吴希泽 (Caesar Wu)	05:06
12.	"情非得已 (Emotional)"	庾澄庆(Harlem Yu)	04:33
13.	"想你想到快疯了 (Going Crazy Thinking About You)"	高隽雅 (Clover Kao)	04:14
14.	"爱，存在(Love Exists)"	魏奇奇 (Kiki Wei)	04:46
15.	"你要的爱(The Love You Want)"	芙筱 (Fu Yan)	04:03
16.	"River"	Bishop Briggs	03:34
17.	"Say Something"	A Great Big World	03:52
18.	"Anyone of Us (Stupid Mistake)"	Gareth Gates	03:48

== Reception ==
=== Ratings ===
In this table, the blue numbers represent the lowest ratings and the red numbers represent the highest ratings.

Episode #	Original broadcast date	Average audience share (CSM52)			Average audience share (National Average)		
Episode #	Original broadcast date	Ratings	Audience share	Ranking	Ratings	Audience share	Ranking
1-2	July 9, 2018	1.126%	8.04%	4	1.11%	9.68%	3
3-4	July 10, 2018	1.032%	7.023%	4	1.11%	9.03%	4
5-6	July 11, 2018	0.991%	6.731%	5	1.12%	8.85%	4
7-8	July 16, 2018	0.931%	7.045%	6	1.1%	9.77%	3
9-10	July 17, 2018	0.919%	6.803%	8	1.12%	9.57%	4
11-12	July 18, 2018	0.983%	7.254%	8	0.97%	8.71%	4
13-14	July 19, 2018	0.922%	6.42%	9	1.12%	9.24%	4
15-16	July 23, 2018	0.861%	6.726%	9	0.97%	9.07%	5
17-18	July 24, 2018	0.893%	6.571%	8	1.09%	9.76%	4
19-20	July 25, 2018	0.969%	7.042%	8	0.99%	8.6%	3
21-22	July 30, 2018	0.916%	6.876%	6	1%	8.92%	4
23-24	July 31, 2018	0.914%	6.792%	5	1.09%	9.31%	4
25-26	August 1, 2018	0.872%	6.584%	6	0.81%	7.21%	5
27-28	August 6, 2018	0.824%	6.46%	7	0.89%	8.07%	4
29-30	August 7, 2018	0.781%	6.058%	7	0.92%	7.92%	4
31-32	August 8, 2018	0.792%	6.027%	6	0.97%	8.61%	4
33-34	August 13, 2018	0.756%	5.808%	7	0.84%	7.59%	5
35-36	August 14, 2018	0.749%	5.771%	5	0.78%	7.22%	4
37-38	August 15, 2018	0.669%	5.325%	6	0.72%	6.66%	4
39-40	August 20, 2018	0.751%	5.879%	3	0.77%	7.31%	3
41-42	August 21, 2018	0.709%	5.595%	3	0.69%	6.33%	3
43-44	August 22, 2018	0.592%	4.336%	7	0.57%	5.1%	5
45-46	August 27, 2018	0.713%	5.694%	7	0.61%	6.09%	3
47-48	August 28, 2018	0.586%	4.658%	4	0.6%	5.95%	4
49-50	August 29, 2018	0.707%	5.554%	8	0.6%	5.7%	4
Average		0.841%	6.32%	—	0.9%	8%	—

In China, ratings of at least 1.0% is considered high due to its large population and numerous TV share.

== International broadcast ==
In the Philippines, the series aired on ABS-CBN from August 20, 2018, to January 4, 2019, replacing The Blood Sisters and was replaced by Minute to Win It: Last Man Standing. On May 4, 2020, the series became a rerun but cancelled caused by a cease-and-desist order from the National Telecommunications Commission after its legislative franchise expired. A month later, it became a rerun again on Kapamilya Channel after it was launched replacing the free-to-air network and the eventual denial on June 15, 2020.
