= Shen Yue (actress) =

Chinese actress (born 1997)

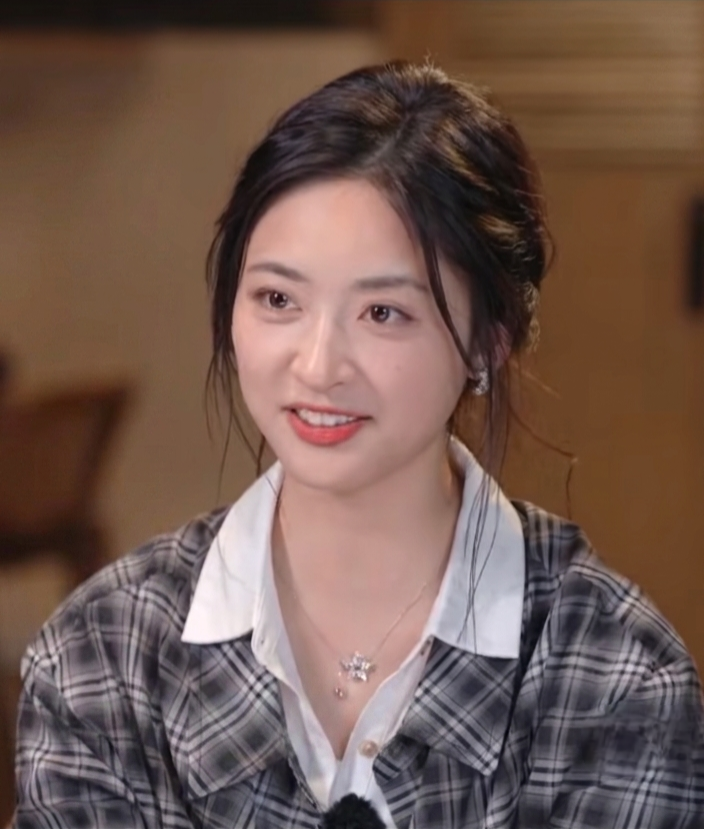
- Shen during The Inn 2026
- Born: February 27, 1997 (age 29); Wugang, Hunan, China
- Education: Hunan Normal University
- Occupations: Actress; model; singer
- Years active: 2017–present
- Agent: Gongfu Mantra Pictures

Chinese name
- Chinese: 沈月
Transcriptions
Standard Mandarin
- Hanyu Pinyin: Shěn Yuè

Shen Yue (Chinese: 沈月; born February 27, 1997) is a Chinese actress and model. She is known for her roles in the series A Love So Beautiful (2017), Meteor Garden (2018), Count Your Lucky Stars (2020), and Mr. Bad (2022).

== Early life ==
Shen Yue was born in Shaoyang City, Hunan Province. In 2014, she studied Journalism and Communication at Hunan Normal University, and was an intern at Hunan Satellite TV. During her second year in college, a photographer friend posted her photo online, which drew the attention of an agency.

== Career ==
Shen participated in the reality show Summer Sweetie released by Hunan TV; later she became an intern in Happy Camp.

In 2017, Shen rose to fame with her role as Chen Xiaoxi in Tencent Video's campus romance drama A Love So Beautiful alongside Hu Yitian, based on the novel To Our Pure Little Beauty by Zhao Gangan.

In 2018, Shen portrayed "Dong Shancai" in the series Meteor Garden, based on the Japanese shōjo manga series Boys Over Flowers (花より男子, Hana Yori Dango) written by Yoko Kamio. The series was acclaimed in the Southeast-Asian region, and was internationally popular. She appears in Chinese variety show The Inn 2.

In 2019, she performed in the annual CCTV Spring Festival Gala, presenting a sketch Office's Story with other artists. She starred in Another Me, a drama based on the film Soul Mate (2016) alongside Chen Duling. In 2020, she starred in the romantic comedy drama Count Your Lucky Stars alongside Jerry Yan. In 2021, Shen starred alongside Jasper Liu in the romantic comedy Use For My Talent, which is a remake of the Korean drama, Clean with Passion for Now.

In February 2021, Shen debuted in the film The Yinyang Master. She starred in the youth comedy Be Yourself, playing a stubborn "tomboy". In 2022, she starred in the romantic fantasy comedy Mr. Bad alongside Chen Zheyuan, directed by Lee Chingjung, which received positive reviews.

== Filmography ==
=== Film ===
Year	English title	Chinese title	Role	Notes/Ref.
2021	The Yinyang Master	侍神令	Shen Le	
2022	One Week Friends	一周的朋友	Song Xiao Nan	
2022	Close to Love	我们的样子像极了爱情	Su Pu	Cameo

=== Television series ===
Year	English title	Chinese title	Role	Network	Notes/Ref.
2017	Autumn Harvest Uprising	秋收起义	Zeng Zhi		
2018	Meteor Garden	流星花园	Dong Shancai	Hunan TV	
2020	With You	在一起	Xiao Zhou	Dragon TV, GDTV, ZJTV	
2025	Six Sisters	六姊妹	young He Jiali	CCTV-1, Tencent	
TBA	The Great Dreamer	大梦想家	Xia Xia	Hunan TV, Mango TV	

=== Web series ===
Year	English title	Chinese title	Role	Network	Notes/Ref.
2017	Let's Shake It	颤抖吧，阿部！	Xiao Yue	Youku	
2017	A Love So Beautiful	致我们单纯的小美好	Chen Xiaoxi	Tencent	
2019	Another Me	七月与安生	Li Ansheng	iQIYI	
2020	Sink or Swim	输不起	Wudi Shen Daxia	Youku	Cameo
2020	Count Your Lucky Stars	我好喜欢你	Tong Xiaoyou	Mango TV, Youku	
2021	Use for My Talent	我亲爱的小洁癖	Shi Shuangjiao	Mango TV	
2021	Be Yourself	机智的上半场	Xia Langlang	Youku	
2022	Mr. Bad	我的反派男友	Nan Xing	iQIYI	
2023	Hi Producer	正好遇见你	Liu Liansheng	iQIYI, Tencent	Cameo
2024	Smile Code	失笑	Gu Yi	Tencent	
2025	Love in Pavilion	淮水竹亭	Dongfang Qinlan	iQIYI	
2025	The Comic Bang	开画！少女漫	Zuo Qiandai	iQIYI	

=== Variety show ===
Year	English title	Chinese title	Role	Ref.
2014	Summer Sweetie	夏日甜心	Cast member	
2018	Back To Field	向往的生活	Guest	
2018	Lipstick Prince	口红王子	Guest	
2018	The Inn 2	亲爱的·客栈2	Cast Member	
2018	Happy Camp	快乐大本营	Guest with F4	
2018	Day Day Up	天天向上	Guest with F4	
2018	Phanta City	幻乐之城	Guest with F4	
2019	Ace Vs. Ace: Season 4	王牌对王牌 4	Guest	
2019	Go Fridge: Season 5	拜托了冰箱第五季	Guest	
2019	Upped New, Old Palace!: Season 2	上新了·故宫第二季	Guest	
2020	Daily Cloud Time	天天云时间	Guest	
2020	Treasured Village	宝藏般的乡村	Cast Member	
2021	My Hometown Is So Beautiful	我的家乡好美	Guest	
2021	Hi Directors	导演请指教	Guest	
2022	Hello Saturday (previously Happy Camp)	你好星期六	Guest	
2022	Snow Day	飘雪的日子来看你	Guest	
2022	Memories Beyond Horizon	无限超越班	Cast Member	
2022	Keep Running: Let's build a better life	奔跑吧·共富篇	Guest	
2023	Youth Periplous Season 4	青春环游记 4	Cast Member	

== Discography ==
=== Soundtrack appearances ===
Year	English title	Chinese title	Album	Notes	Ref.
2019	"I Miss You"	我想你	Bureau of Transformer OST		
2019	"Qiyue and Ansheng"	七月与安生	Another Me OST	with Chen Duling	
2020	"Heart Warms Heart Equals to the World"	心暖心等于世界			
2020	"I Really Like You"	我好喜欢你	Count Your Lucky Stars OST	with Jerry Yan	
2021	“My Shape"	我的形状	Be Your Self OST	with Zhang Ruonan, Vivienne Tien, Zhang Xinyi	
2022	"Be My Warrior"	做我的勇士	Mr. Bad OST	with Chen Zheyuan	

== Awards and nominations ==
Year	Award	Category	Nominated work	Result	Ref.
2018	Baidu Entertainment Award	Character of the Year	—N/a	Won	
2018	Weibo V Influence Summit	Top 10 Positive Energy Model	—N/a	Won	
2019	Next Generation Influencers for Global Philanthropy	Young Philanthropy Star	—N/a	Won	
2019	Golden Bud - The Fourth Network Film And Television Festival	Best Actress	Another Me	Nominated	
2019	Madame Figaro Fashion Awards	Philanthropy Idol of the Year	—N/a	Won	
2020	Like China	Most Popular Actress Among Teenagers	—N/a	Won	
2023	Weibo Night 2022	Progress Actress of the Year	—N/a	Won	
2024	Artist Of the Year Award	2024 The Most Attractive Asian Artist	—N/a	Won	
2025	V Magazine China's Remarkable Women's Night	Pioneer Actor of the Year	—N/a	Won	
2025	Weibo Thailand Cultural Exchange Night	Most Popular Chinese Actress Overseas	—N/a	Won	
2025	Weibo TV and Internet Video Summit 2025	Breakthrough Actor of the Year	—N/a	Won	
2025	21st Chinese American Film and Television Festival	Rising Star of the Year	Six Sisters	Won	
2025	iQIYI Scream Night Macau	Top 10 Actor of the Year	Love in Pavilion	Won	
2025	China TV Drama Awards	Breakthrough Actress of the Year	Six Sisters	Won	
