= Soul Mate (2016 film) =

2016 Hong Kong-Chinese film by Derek Tsang

- Theatrical release poster
- Chinese: 七月与安生
- Directed by: Derek Tsang
- Screenplay by: Lam Wing Sum; Li Yuan; Xu Yi-meng; Wu Nan
- Based on: Soul Mate by Anni Baobei
- Produced by: Peter Chan; Jojo Hui
- Starring: Zhou Dongyu; Ma Sichun
- Cinematography: Jake Pollock; Fisher Yu
- Edited by: Derek Hui; Li Dianshi; Zhou Xiaolin; Tan Xiang-Yuan
- Music by: Peter Kam; Yusuke Hatano
- Production companies: Jike Film (Shanghai); Beijing Jiaying Pictures; Alibaba Pictures Group; We Productions; Horgos Jiamei Film; Tianen Entertainment; Shanghai Jike Media; Wo Men Ya Bo Si Film Distribution (Beijing)
- Distributed by: Beijing Jiaying Pictures; Wo Men Ya Bo Si Film Distribution (Beijing); Sanyue Guyu (Beijing) Meida; Jike Film (Shanghai); Huaxia Film Distribution
- Release dates: 14 September 2016 (China); 27 October 2016 (Hong Kong)
- Running time: 110 minutes
- Countries: Hong Kong; China
- Language: Mandarin
- Budget: $8 million (estimated)
- Box office: CN¥166.9 million

Soul Mate is a 2016 romantic drama film directed by Derek Tsang, based on the novel of the same name by Anni Baobei. It stars Zhou Dongyu and Ma Sichun. A Hong Kong-Chinese co-production, the film was released on 14 September and 27 October 2016 in mainland China and Hong Kong respectively.

== Plot ==
Thirty year-old working woman Li Ansheng's life in Shanghai is suddenly disrupted by the publication of a novel, entitled "Qiyue and Ansheng", a chronicle of her friendship with Qi Yue during her youth. Coupled with an accidental encounter with Su Jia Ming, a past love, her long repressed memories are unleashed with the force of a tsunami. The two girls seemed destined to become friends from the moment they entered high school. Though they were inseparable and believed that their bond would last for the rest of their lives, the cruelty of youth eventually led them to separate paths. Even more shocking is the discovery of a long buried secret shared by the women - a secret that serves as an emblem of their youth and the proof of their friendship.

== Cast ==
- Zhou Dongyu as Li Ansheng
- Ma Sichun as Lin Qiyue
- Toby Lee as Su Jiaming

== Reception ==
On Rotten Tomatoes the film has an approval rating of 100% based on 9 reviews.

Edmund Lee of South China Morning Post commended the film for transcending its potentially cloying premise to tell a story of friendship and love that’s at once melancholy and very emotional. Both Zhou and Ma were credited for the film's success with their skillful displays of raw emotion.

Soul Mate received 7 nominations at the annual Taipei Golden Horse Film Festival and Awards in 2016, and made history with a joint Best Actress win.

== Accolades ==
Awards	Category	Nominee	Results	Ref.
53rd Golden Horse Film Awards	Best Director	Derek Tsang	Nominated	
53rd Golden Horse Film Awards	Best Actress	Zhou Dongyu	Won	
53rd Golden Horse Film Awards	Best Actress	Sandra Ma	Won	
53rd Golden Horse Film Awards	Best Screenplay	Lam Wing Sum, Li Yuan, Xu Yi-meng, Wu Nan	Nominated	
53rd Golden Horse Film Awards	Best Makeup & Costume Design	Dora Ng	Nominated	
53rd Golden Horse Film Awards	Best Original Film Song	"(It’s Not A Crime) It’s Just What We Do"	Nominated	
12th Chinese American Film Festival	Golden Angel Award Film		Won	
23rd Hong Kong Film Critics Society Award	Best Actress	Zhou Dongyu	Won	
23rd Hong Kong Film Critics Society Award	Films of Merit	Soul Mate	Won	
11th Asian Film Awards	Best Director	Derek Tsang	Nominated	
11th Asian Film Awards	Best Actress	Zhou Dongyu	Nominated	
36th Hong Kong Film Award	Best Film		Nominated	
36th Hong Kong Film Award	Best Director	Derek Tsang	Nominated	
36th Hong Kong Film Award	Best Actress	Zhou Dongyu	Nominated	
36th Hong Kong Film Award	Best Actress	Sandra Ma	Nominated	
36th Hong Kong Film Award	Best Screenplay	Lam Wing-sum, Li Yuan, Xu Yi-meng, Wu Nan	Nominated	
36th Hong Kong Film Award	Best Cinematography	Jake Pollock, Jing-Ping Yu	Nominated	
36th Hong Kong Film Award	Best Editing	Derek Hui, Li Dianshi, Zhou Xiaolin, Tan Xiang-Yuan	Nominated	
36th Hong Kong Film Award	Best Art Direction	Zhai Tao	Nominated	
36th Hong Kong Film Award	Best Costume Make Up Design	Dora Ng	Nominated	
36th Hong Kong Film Award	Best Original Film Score	Peter Kam, Yusuke Hatano	Won	
36th Hong Kong Film Award	Best Original Film Song	"(It’s Not A Crime) It’s Just What We Do"	Nominated	
36th Hong Kong Film Award	Best New Director	Derek Tsang	Nominated	
1st Malaysia International Film Festival	Best Film		Nominated	
1st Malaysia International Film Festival	Best Actress	Zhou Dongyu	Nominated	
1st Malaysia International Film Festival	Best Screenplay	Lam Wing-sum, Li Yuan, Xu Yi-meng, Wu Nan	Nominated	
1st Malaysia International Film Festival	Best Cinematography	Jake Pollock, Fisher Yu	Nominated	
8th China Film Director's Guild Awards	Best Film		Nominated	
8th China Film Director's Guild Awards	Best Actress	Zhou Dongyu	Nominated	
8th China Film Director's Guild Awards	Best Actress	Sandra Ma	Nominated	
8th China Film Director's Guild Awards	Best Screenwriter	Lam Wing-sum, Li Yuan, Xu Yi-meng, Wu Nan	Nominated	
8th China Film Director's Guild Awards	Best Hong Kong / Taiwan Director	Derek Tsang	Won	
Osaka Asian Film Festival 2017	ABC Award	Soul Mate	Won	
24th Beijing College Student Film Festival	Best Film	Soul Mate	Nominated	
24th Beijing College Student Film Festival	Best Screenplay	Lam Wing-sum, Li Yuan, Xu Yi-meng, Wu Nan	Won	
24th Beijing College Student Film Festival	Best Actress	Zhou Dongyu	Nominated	
24th Beijing College Student Film Festival	Best Actress	Sandra Ma	Nominated	
31st Golden Rooster Awards	Best Picture		Nominated	
31st Golden Rooster Awards	Best Actress	Zhou Dongyu	Nominated	
31st Golden Rooster Awards	Best Directorial Debut	Derek Tsang	Nominated	
31st Golden Rooster Awards	Best Editing	Derek Hui, Li Dianshi, Zhou Xiaolin, Tan Xiang-Yuan	Nominated	
17th Chinese Film Media Awards	Best Actress	Zhou Dongyu	Nominated	
17th Chinese Film Media Awards	Best Actress	Sandra Ma	Nominated	
17th Chinese Film Media Awards	Best Screenwriter	Lam Wing-sum, Li Yuan, Xu Yi-meng, Wu Nan	Nominated	
2nd Golden Screen Awards	Best Director	Derek Tsang	Won	
2nd Golden Screen Awards	Best Actress	Zhou Dongyu	Won	
2nd Golden Screen Awards	Best Actress	Ma Sichun	Won	
2nd Golden Screen Awards	Best Screenplay	Lam Wing-sum, Li Yuan, Xu Yi-meng, Wu Nan	Won	
34th Hundred Flowers Awards	Best Picture	Soul Mate	Nominated	
34th Hundred Flowers Awards	Best Director	Derek Tsang	Nominated	
34th Hundred Flowers Awards	Best Writing	Lam Wing-sum, Li Yuan, Xu Yi-meng, Wu Nan	Won	
34th Hundred Flowers Awards	Best Actress	Ma Sichun	Nominated	
34th Hundred Flowers Awards	Best Actress	Zhou Dongyu	Nominated	
34th Hundred Flowers Awards	Best Supporting Actress	Li Haofang	Nominated	
34th Hundred Flowers Awards	Best Newcomer	Li Chengbin	Nominated	
