= Boys Over Flowers =

Japanese manga series

- First tankōbon volume cover, featuring (from left to right) Tsukasa Domyoji, Tsukushi Makino, and Sojirou Nishikado

花より男子(だんご) (Hana yori Dango)
- Genre: Reverse harem; Romantic comedy
- Manga
- Written by: Yoko Kamio
- Published by: Shueisha
- English publisher: NA: Viz Media
- Imprint: Margaret Comics
- Magazine: Margaret
- Original run: October 1992 – January 2004
- Volumes: 37
- Live-action television and films
- Hana yori Dango (1995, Japan); Meteor Garden (2001, Taiwan); Meteor Rain (2001, Taiwan); Meteor Garden II (2002, Taiwan); Boys Over Flowers (2005, Japan); Boys Over Flowers 2 (2007, Japan); Hana yori Dango Final: The Movie (2008, Japan); Boys Over Flowers (2009, South Korea); Meteor Garden (2018, China); F4 Thailand: Boys Over Flowers (2021, Thailand)
- Anime television series

Hana yori Dango
- Directed by: Shigeyasu Yamauchi
- Produced by: Tetsu Odake (ABC); Yasuo Kameyama (Asatsu); Takashi Horiuchi (Asatsu); Hiromi Seki
- Written by: Yumi Kageyama
- Music by: Michiru Ōshima
- Studio: Toei Animation
- Licensed by: NA: Discotek Media
- Original network: ANN (ABC, TV Asahi)
- Original run: September 8, 1996 – August 31, 1997
- Episodes: 51
- Anime film

Hana yori Dango: The Movie
- Directed by: Shigeyasu Yamauchi
- Written by: Yumi Kageyama
- Music by: Michiru Ōshima
- Studio: Toei Animation
- Licensed by: NA: Discotek Media
- Released: March 8, 1997
- Runtime: 30 minutes
- Related
- Boys Over Flowers Season 2 (sequel)

Boys Over Flowers (Japanese: 花より男子(だんご), Hepburn: Hana yori Dango) (Note: Here, the word 男子 (boy) is used instead of 団子 (dango) as in the idiom, but it is pronounced as だんご (dango) instead of だんし (danshi).) is a Japanese manga series written and illustrated by Yoko Kamio. The story takes place in the fictional Eitoku Academy, an elite school for children from rich families. It tells the story of Tsukushi Makino, a girl from a middle-class family, whose mother enrolls her in an elite high school to compete with the families from her husband's company. While at Eitoku, she encounters the F4, a gang of four boys who are children of Japan's wealthiest families and who bully anyone that gets in their way.

The series was serialized in Shueisha's Margaret magazine from October 1992 to January 2004, with its chapters collected in 37 tankōbon volumes between 1992 and 2008. In North America, the manga is licensed by Viz Media.

The manga has been adapted into various mediums. It was first adapted as an audio drama released on CD from July 1993 to July 1994. This was followed by a Japanese live-action feature film in 1995, then an animated television series, produced by Toei Animation, that was broadcast by ABC from 1996 to 1997. The first live-action television adaptation was one produced in Taiwan, titled Meteor Garden (2001). After Taiwan's Meteor Garden, a number of other live-action television adaptations have followed. A Japanese live-action series aired from 2005 to 2007 (and was followed by a 2008 film), a South Korean adaptation aired in 2009, a mainland Chinese adaptation, also titled Meteor Garden aired in 2018, and a Thai adaptation, F4 Thailand: Boys Over Flowers, was aired from 2021 to 2022.

In 1996, Boys Over Flowers won the 41st Shogakukan Manga Award for the shōjo manga category. By February 2015, the series had over 61 million copies in circulation, making it one of the best-selling manga series of all time and the best-selling shōjo manga of all time. The series enjoys immense popularity in the Eastern Asia region.

== Plot ==
Eitoku Academy (英徳学園, Eitoku Gakuen) in Yamanote, Japan is a prestigious school that caters to children from upper-class families. Hence, Tsukushi Makino, who comes from a middle-class family, fulfills the literal meaning of her name, as she is initially considered to be the "weed" of the school. The school is ruled by the F4 ("Flower Four"), four young men from Japan's wealthiest families. Tsukasa Domyoji is the son of the wealthiest, most powerful family in Japan. They initially bully Tsukushi when she stands up to them. However, Domyoji eventually takes an interest in her because she is the only girl in the school who stands up to him. Tsukushi, however, is repulsed by his hot-headed nature and bullying demeanor, falling instead for soft-spoken and sensitive Rui Hanazawa, Tsukasa's best friend since childhood.

The other two members of the F4 are Akira Mimasaka, the laid-back peacemaker of the group, and Sojirou Nishikado, an unrepentant playboy. They both usually have at least one girlfriend at any one time; Akira prefers older women because the women of his household (his mother and two younger sisters) are quite childish. Sojirou is happy to be in casual relationships with many women, although we later discover that at one time he was in love with a childhood friend. Over time, Tsukushi's feelings towards Tsukasa evolve, as she begins to appreciate the degree of change that occurred in Tsukasa once he fell in love with her. However, because of the difference in social class, Tsukushi and Tsukasa's relationship is blocked by Tsukasa's mother, Kaede but supported by his elder sister, Tsubaki, who becomes friends with Tsukushi.

== Characters ==
Tsukushi Makino (牧野 つくし, Makino Tsukushi)
Voiced by: Maki Mochida (anime), Megumi Toyoguchi (video game)
The protagonist who is a teenage high school girl whose name, Tsukushi, means "weed". She is thus the "weed" that will challenge the "Flower Four" or F4. Tsukushi is one of the very few students studying at Eitoku High School to come from a middle-class family. Her mother pushed her to join Eitoku because the children of her father's work colleagues all attend prestigious schools. Tsukushi is unhappy at Eitoku, but feels if she quietly exists for two years, she can survive it. However, after defending her friend who accidentally falls down a set of stairs and onto the leader of the F4, Tsukasa Domyoji, she, instead, receives a red card—a declaration of war. This officially marks her for future torment by the F4 and the rest of the student body.
However, unlike most of the F4's targets, Tsukushi retaliates by directly attacking Tsukasa. This unexpected retaliation and steadfast resistance to the hazing is one that he has never encountered from a target before, and falls in love with Tsukushi. Initially, Tsukushi hates all of the F4 except Rui Hanazawa, for whom she harbors romantic feelings. But, after Rui admits that he will never stop loving his childhood sweetheart Shizuka, Tsukushi slowly falls in love with Tsukasa and becomes friends with the F4.
Tsukasa Domyoji (道明寺 司, Dōmyōji Tsukasa)
Voiced by: Naoki Miyashita (anime), Takahiro Sakurai (video game)
Tsukasa is the leader of the F4 group and the heir to the large Domyoji Enterprises. He grew up with the rest of the F4 as his mother was always overseas, and his older sister relocated to Los Angeles after her marriage. His mother, in particular, is cold towards him, and wants to control his life for the sake of preserving the family name.
As the extremely hot-headed and volatile leader of the F4, Tsukasa uses his power to rule over the entire school. He uses an infamous red card and attaches it inside anyone's locker who has made the F4, particularly him, upset. A red card gives the entire student body at Eitoku free rein to bully, prank, and humiliate the receiver until they decide to leave the school. However, Tsukushi's declaration of war against the F4 after receiving the red card, retaliation against the student body and strong will, reminds Tsukasa of his beloved older sister, Tsubaki. He thus grows fond of Tsukushi, eventually falling madly in love with her.
Rui Hanazawa (花沢 類, Hanazawa Rui)
Voiced by: Koji Yamamoto (anime), Mamoru Miyano (video game)
Rui is Tsukasa's best friend and Tsukushi's first romantic interest. He is generally quiet, distant, uninterested in people and is said to be autistic. He only opens up to his close friends and the model Shizuka Todo, to whom he was betrothed at birth. Rui admires Tsukushi's courage in standing up to Tsukasa and eventually begins to help her. After he comes back from France and witnessing Shizuka's marriage, Rui was very frustrated and slowly falls in love with Tsukushi. However, after learning that Tsukushi genuinely loves Tsukasa, Rui backs off.
Sojirou Nishikado (西門 総二郎, Nishikado Sōjirō)
Voiced by: Yoshihiko Akaida (anime), Ryōtarō Okiayu (video game)
Sojirou is the second son of the Nishikado family and the biggest playboy of the F4. He is devoted to the practice of traditional Japanese tea ceremonies (which is his family's business). For the most part, he and Akira usually work to keep the peace within the group and following Tsukasa.
Akira Mimasaka (美作 あきら, Mimasaka Akira)
Voiced by: Yūta Mochizuki (anime), Takashi Kondō (video game)
Akira is arguably the most mature member of F4. His family is very powerful in the Japanese underground (in the manga they own a large trading company). He keeps his cool and rarely loses his temper, although when he does, even Domyoji has to run for the hills. He has a pair of young twin sisters who annoy him due to their intense affection for him.
Yuuki Matsuoka (松岡 優紀, Matsuoka Yūki)
Voiced by: Kanako Tobimatsu (anime)
Yuuki is Tsukushi's childhood friend. The two work together at a dango shop after school. Yuuki cares a lot about Tsukushi's feelings, and does not want anybody to hurt Tsukushi. Yuuki offers Tsukushi a lot of encouragement and advice about her situation with the F4.
Shizuka Todou (藤堂 静, Tōdōu Shizuka)
Voiced by: Keiko Imamura (anime)
Shizuka is a rich heiress, a fashion model, and a childhood friend of the F4, particularly Rui. She was the first person who was able to get him to come out of his shell, and the two were inseparable for much of their childhood. She began a modeling career during her high school years, but at her twentieth birthday party she announces that she will give up her career as a model as well as her position as the Todou heiress to move to Paris and become a human rights lawyer. She was very kind toward Tsukushi, as she sees her as Rui's romantic interest. Rui initially accompanies Shizuka to Paris at Tsukushi's request, but their relationship suffers as Shizuka spends more and more time at work. Towards the end of the manga series, Rui tell's Tsukushi that what happened between him and Shizuka is completely over and thats okay with him, they're on good terms and are still friends.
Kazuya Aoike (青池 和也, Aoike Kazuya)
Voiced by: Yoji Ietomi (anime), Hiro Shimono (video game)
Kazuya is another one of Tsukushi's childhood friends. He enrolls at Eitoku after his family comes into money through some real-estate deals. The other students at Eitoku draw a sharp distinction between Kazuya's "new money" and their "old money". The F4, in particular, mention this difference fairly often and consider him to be a nuisance as the story progresses, and simply tolerate him because of Tsukushi's fondness for him.
Makiko Endo (遠藤真紀子, Endō Makiko)
Voiced by: Fuko Misaki (anime)
Makiko is one of Tsukushi's only friends at Eitoku in the beginning of the series. Tsukushi rescues her from inevitable torment after she collides with Domyouji on the stairs. Although she is forced to break off their friendship to prevent becoming a target of abuse, Makiko finds ways to help Tsukushi, sending her secret messages of encouragement or to warn her of impending danger.
Sakurako Sanjo (三条 桜子, Sanjō Sakurako)
Voiced by: Rumi Shishido (anime)
Sakurako was the target of bullying as a young child, particularly by the F4, because she was born "ugly". When she confessed her love to Domyoji, he traumatized her by making fun of her looks. She eventually moved to Germany because of her family's business, and underwent plastic surgery to end the bullying. Many years later, she returns to Eitoku, where no one recognizes her now attractive face. She plans to take revenge on the F4, and befriends Tsukushi (who is unaware of her history). When she hears of Domyoji's growing attraction to Tsukushi, she conspires with her friend Thomas to destroy her.
Junpei Oribe (織部 順平, Oribe Junpei)
Voiced by: Hiroki Takahashi (anime)
Junpei is a kōhai of Tsukushi's that saves her from being bullied after she gets back from her trip to Canada. He first appears as a nerdy boy, with glasses and an oblivious attitude. He is actually a famous model for a well-known magazine, hiding his identity in school through his glasses. Tsukushi sees him as the only other person at school who thinks the way she thinks after he says he only needs to endure two more years. Junpei's real motive is to lure Domyoji in order to take revenge for an injury his older brother endured. He uses Tsukushi as bait to lure Tsukasa to him and his friend, who are looking for vengeance after being humiliated by Tsukasa.
Shigeru Okawahara (大河原 滋, Okawahara Shigeru)
Voiced by: Emiko Sato (anime)
Shigeru is the heiress of the Okawahara Corporation, and Tsukasa's fiance for the arranged marriage created by his mother. Tsukasa neither likes nor wants to marry her, although she falls in love with him. She also befriends Tsukushi without knowing of her past relationship with Tsukasa. She was a student at Eirin Academy. Eventually, she came to support Tsukasa's relationship with Tsukushi.
Tsubaki Domyouji (道明寺 椿, Dōmyōji Tsubaki)
Voiced by: Chiho Okawa (anime)
Tsubaki is Tsukasa's elder sister, and closest friend. Although she bullies him, he adores and trusts her more than anyone else, as she raised him in the absence of their parents. After she graduated from Eitoku, she dated a working class man, which led to her mother forcing them apart so that Tsubaki could marry a wealthier man. Although she has obtained a degree of happiness in her marriage, she often gets sad and travels home to Japan when her husband is busy overseas. She begs Tsukasa not to make the same mistake in love. She sees Tsukushi as a younger sister, and always helps with her relationship with Tsukasa.
Kaede Domyoji (道明寺 楓, Dōmyōji Kaede)
Voiced by: Mika Doi (anime)
Kaede is Tsukasa's controlling mother and is the chairwoman of Domyoji Enterprises. She is a powerful and feared businesswoman who does everything she can to end Tsukasa's relationship with Tsukushi. At one point, she tried to pay Tsukushi 50 million yen to get her to agree not to see Tsukasa again. However, Tsukushi's mother refused the money and poured salt onto Kaede's head because Kaede had insulted Tsukushi. Kaede then tried to force Tsukasa to marry Shigeru. When she found out that Tsukasa was going to break up with Shigeru, she became furious and forced Tsukasa to marry Shigeru quickly. When Shigeru and Tsukasa "marry", she witnesses Shigeru's true plan to set Tsukasa and Tsukushi up and even tries to stop it at first. But after knowing that Tsukushi truly cares about Tsukasa and everyone else, she accepts their relationship and eventual marriage.

== Media ==
=== Manga ===
Written and illustrated by Yoko Kamio, Boys Over Flowers was serialized in Shueisha's bi-weekly magazine Margaret from October 1992 to January 2004. In July 2006, a short story based on the manga was published in issue 15 of Margaret magazine; another two-installment short story was published in January 2007. The series was collected in 37 tankōbon volumes released between October 23, 1992, and June 25, 2008. English translations of all 37 volumes were released between 2003 and 2009 by Viz Media. It has also been published by Glénat in France, and by Planeta DeAgostini in Spain.

Kamio began a sequel, Boys Over Flowers Season 2, in Shueisha's Shōnen Jump+ online magazine on February 15, 2015.

=== CD ===
An audio drama adaptation of Boys Over Flowers, marketed as "CD books" (CD ブック), was released from July 1993 to July 1994. It starred Takuya Kimura, in his voice-acting debut, as the voice of Rui Hanazawa, whom this adaptation focused on.

=== Live-action television and films ===
Official
Country	Local title	Network	Original run	Main characters (Actor)					
Japan	Hana yori Dango	feature film	August 19, 1995	Tsukushi Makino (Yuki Uchida)	Tsukasa Domyoji (Shosuke Tanihara)	Rui Hanazawa (Naohito Fujiki)	Akira Mimasaka (Koichi Hashizume)	Sojiro Nishikado (Kensaku Saeki)	—N/a
Taiwan	Meteor Garden (original)	CTS	April 12 – August 16, 2001	Shān Cài (Barbie Hsu)	Dào Míng Sì (Jerry Yan)	Huā Zé Lèi (Vic Chou)	Měi Zuò (Vanness Wu)	Xī Mén (Ken Chu)	—N/a
Taiwan	Meteor Garden II	CTS	November 11 – December 25, 2002	Shān Cài (Barbie Hsu)	Dào Míng Sì (Jerry Yan)	Huā Zé Lèi (Vic Chou)	Měi Zuò (Vanness Wu)	Xī Mén (Ken Chu)	—N/a
Japan	Hana yori Dango	TBS	October 21 – December 16, 2005	Tsukushi Makino (Mao Inoue)	Tsukasa Domyoji (Jun Matsumoto)	Rui Hanazawa (Shun Oguri)	Akira Mimasaka (Tsuyoshi Abe)	Sojiro Nishikado (Shota Matsuda)	—N/a
Japan	Hana yori Dango 2	TBS	January 5 – March 16, 2007	Tsukushi Makino (Mao Inoue)	Tsukasa Domyoji (Jun Matsumoto)	Rui Hanazawa (Shun Oguri)	Akira Mimasaka (Tsuyoshi Abe)	Sojiro Nishikado (Shota Matsuda)	—N/a
Japan	Hana yori Dango Final: The Movie	feature film	June 28, 2008	Tsukushi Makino (Mao Inoue)	Tsukasa Domyoji (Jun Matsumoto)	Rui Hanazawa (Shun Oguri)	Akira Mimasaka (Tsuyoshi Abe)	Sojiro Nishikado (Shota Matsuda)	—N/a
South Korea	Boys Over Flowers	KBS2	January 5 – March 31, 2009	Geum Jan-di (Ku Hye-sun)	Gu Jun-pyo (Lee Min-ho)	Yoon Ji-hu (Kim Hyun-joong)	Song Woo-bin (Kim Joon)	So Yi-jung (Kim Bum)	—N/a
China	Meteor Garden (remake)	Hunan Television	July 9 – August 29, 2018	Dong Shancai (Shen Yue)	Daoming Si (Dylan Wang)	Huaze Lei (Darren Chen)	Feng Meizuo (Connor Leong)	Ximen Yan (Caesar Wu)	—N/a
Thailand	F4 Thailand: Boys Over Flowers	GMM 25	December 18, 2021 – April 9, 2022	Gorya / Thithara Jundee (Tontawan Tantivejakul)	Thyme / Akira Paramaanantra (Vachirawit Chivaaree)	Ren / Renrawin Aira (Jirawat Sutivanisak)	MJ / Methas Jarustiwa (Hirunkit Changkham)	Kavin / Taemiyaklin Kittiyangkul (Metawin Opas-iamkajorn)	—N/a
Unofficial (unlicensed)
Indonesia	Siapa Takut Jatuh Cinta	SCTV	April 2002	Oni (Leony Vitria Hartanti)	Indra (Indra Bruggman)	Roger (Roger Danuarta)	Yusuf Iman (Steve Emmanuel)	Jonathan (Jonathan Frizzy)	—N/a
China	Meteor Shower	Hunan Television	August 8, 2009 – August 30, 2010	Chu Yuxun (Zheng Shuang)	Murong Yunhai (Hans Zhang)	Duanmu Lei (Yu Haoming)	Ye Shuo (Vision Wei)	Shangguan Ruiqian (Zhu Zixiao)	—N/a
India	Kaisi Yeh Yaariaan	MTV India (1–2); Voot (3)	July 21, 2014 – June 7, 2018	Nandini Murthy (Niti Taylor)	Manik Malhotra (Parth Samthaan)	Dhruv Vedant (Utkarsh Gupta)	Mukti Vardhan (Charlie Chauhan)	Cabir Dhawan (Ayaz Ahmed)	Alya Saxena (Krissann Barretto)
Indonesia	Siapa Takut Jatuh Cinta	SCTV	November 13, 2017 – October 28, 2018	Laras Ayuningtyas (Natasha Wilona)	Alvino Adijaya (Verrell Bramasta)	Leon (Bryan Domani)	Satya Adijaya (Aliando Syarief)	Sean Adijaya (Teejay Marquez)	—N/a

Note: In 2008–2009, such 2 of the 3 Boys Over Flowers live-action television series as Hana yori Dango with its sequel Hana yori Dango Returns in Japan and Boys Over Flowers in South Korea were aired on Xing Kong (currently owned by Star China Media, a subsidiary of China Media Capital) dubbed in Mandarin except Meteor Garden with its sequel Meteor Garden II in Taiwan using its audio with Chinese subtitles.

=== Anime ===
An anime television series produced by Toei Animation and broadcast on television by Asahi Broadcasting Corporation and TV Asahi in 1996. It was followed by a spin-off theatrical short film, set in an alternate universe, in 1997. This is the final television series produced by Toei Animation to utilize cel animation; all television series produced by the company then after would use digital ink-and-paint. The anime was later released in Northern America on DVD by Viz Media in 2003, as Boys Over Flowers. It was then rereleased by Discotek Media in 2016, as Hana yori Dango.

==== Episodes ====
No.	Title	Original air date
1	"Declaration of War!" Transcription: "Sensen Fukoku!" (Japanese: 宣戦布告！)	September 8, 1996
2	"No Brand Girl" Transcription: "Nōburando no Onna!" (Japanese: ノーブランドの女！)	September 15, 1996
3	"I Won't be Hurt!" Transcription: "Kizutsui Tari Shinai!" (Japanese: 傷ついたりしない！)	September 22, 1996
4	"The Ordinary Duo!" Transcription: "Panpīna Futari!" (Japanese: パンピーな二人！)	September 29, 1996
5	"Me, Him... and the Other Guy!" Transcription: "Kare to Atashi to Aitsu" (Japanese: 彼とあたしとアイツ)	October 6, 1996
6	"Cinderella for a Night" Transcription: "Hitoyo no Shinderera" (Japanese: 一夜のシンデレラ)	October 13, 1996
7	"Atami Night Love" Transcription: "Koi no Atami Naito" (Japanese: 恋のアタミナイト)	October 20, 1996
8	"The Nightmare of the Fall Term!!" Transcription: "Shingakki no Akumu!!" (Japanese: 新学期の悪夢！！)	October 27, 1996
9	"Tsukasa Domyoji Snaps!" Transcription: "Dōmyōji Tsukasa Kireru!" (Japanese: 道明寺司・キレル！)	November 10, 1996
10	"The Woman Who Gave Up Everything" Transcription: "Subete o Suteru Hito" (Japanese: すべてを捨てる女性)	November 17, 1996
11	"Love Beyond the Horizon" Transcription: "Ai wa Ōzora no Kanatahe" (Japanese: 愛は大空の彼方へ)	November 24, 1996
12	"A Date in the Snow" Transcription: "Dēto!? Yuki no Omotesandō" (Japanese: デート！？ 雪の表参道)	December 1, 1996
13	"Love Moves Too Fast" Transcription: "Haya Sugiru Koi no Tenkai" (Japanese: はやすぎる恋の展開)	December 8, 1996
14	"Sakurako's Secret" Transcription: "Sakurako no Kakusareta Himitsu" (Japanese: 桜子の隠された秘密)	December 15, 1996
15	"Get Lost!!" Transcription: "Tottoto Kiena!!" (Japanese: とっとと消えな！！)	December 22, 1996
16	"Please Believe Me!" Transcription: "Atashi o Shinjite!" (Japanese: あたしを信じて！)	December 29, 1996
17	"Mine at Last" Transcription: "Yatto Tsukamaeta" (Japanese: やっとつかまえた)	January 5, 1997
18	"Will You Go Out with Me?" Transcription: "Ore to Tsukiawanai?" (Japanese: 俺とつきあわない？)	January 12, 1997
19	"Be Still My Beating Heart" Transcription: "Sazameku Mune no Kotori" (Japanese: さざめく胸の小鳥)	January 19, 1997
20	"Night of Betrayal" Transcription: "Uragiri no Atsui Yoru" (Japanese: 裏切りの暑い夜)	January 26, 1997
21	"The Crime and Punishment of a Kiss" Transcription: "Kisu to Tsumi to Batsu" (Japanese:キスの罪と罰)	February 2, 1997
22	"A Bewildering First Date!" Transcription: "Tomadoi no Hatsu Dēto" (Japanese: 戸惑いの初デート)	February 9, 1997
23	"The Arrival of Tsubaki Domyoji!" Transcription: "Dōmyōji Tsubaki Arawaru!" (Japanese: 道明寺椿あらわる！)	February 16, 1997
24	"Love's Tempest! Being Expelled!?" Transcription: "Ai no Arashi! Gakuen Tsuihō!?" (Japanese: 愛の嵐！学園追放！？)	February 23, 1997
25	"Two Ways to Love" Transcription: "Futari Sorezore no Ai" (Japanese: 人・それぞれの愛)	March 2, 1997
26	"Sleepless Night!" Transcription: "Nemurenai Futari no Yoru!" (Japanese: 眠れない二人の夜！)	March 9, 1997
27	"Tsukasa Goes to New York!!" Transcription: "Dōmyōji, Nyū Yōku e!!" (Japanese: 道明寺、N.Yへ！！)	March 16, 1997
28	"Tsukushi Goes to Canada!!" Transcription: "Tsukushi, Kanada e!!" (Japanese: つくし、カナダへ！！)	March 23, 1997
29	"His Body Against Mine" Transcription: "Aitsu no Nukumori!" (Japanese: アイツのぬくもり！)	March 30, 1997
30	"Do You Want a Friend?" Transcription: "Tomodachi, Iranai?" (Japanese: 友だち、いらない？)	April 6, 1997
31	"Shock! Horror! Another Red Card!" Transcription: "Shōgeki! Nidome no Akafuda" (Japanese: 衝撃！二度目の赤札)	April 13, 1997
32	"Tsukasa Won't Come...?" Transcription: "Dōmyōji wa Konai?" (Japanese: 道明寺は・・・来ない？)	April 20, 1997
33	"Someday We'll Laugh..." Transcription: "Itsuka Waraeru hi" (Japanese: いつか笑える日)	April 27, 1997
34	"The Woman in My Life!" Transcription: "Ore no Daijina Onna Desu!" (Japanese: 俺の大事な女です！)	May 4, 1997
35	"Lovers on the Run!?" Transcription: "Koi no Tōhikō!?" (Japanese: 恋の逃避行！？)	May 11, 1997
36	"Tsukasa's Mother's Secret Plan" Transcription: "Tsukasa no Haha no Hisokana Takurami" (Japanese: 司の母の密かな企み)	May 18, 1997
37	"It's Showdown Time!" Transcription: "Shikumareta Taiketsu!" (Japanese: 仕組まれた対決！)	May 25, 1997
38	"I Will Tame You!!" Transcription: "Chōkyō Shite Ageru!!" (Japanese: 調教してあげる！！)	June 1, 1997
39	"Love Triangle from Hell!" Transcription: "Ma no Toraianguru" (Japanese: 魔のトライアングル)	June 8, 1997
40	"The Turning of Love's Tide" Transcription: "Koi no Hikigiwa Bunkiten" (Japanese: 恋の引き際・分岐点)	June 15, 1997
41	"The Dawning of a New Day" Transcription: "Atarashī Hibi no Hajimari" (Japanese: 新しい日々の始まり)	June 20, 1997
42	"Surprise! A Double Date!" Transcription: "Battari! W Dēto" (Japanese: バッタリ！Wデート)	June 29, 1997
43	"Deep Wounds of the Heart" Transcription: "Kokoro no Kizu wa Fukakute Omoi" (Japanese: 心の傷は深くて重い)	July 6, 1997
44	"You're Not the One" Transcription: "Omae ja Dameda!" (Japanese: おまえじゃダメだ！)	July 13, 1997
45	"Open Up Your Heart" Transcription: "Sunao ni Nareba?" (Japanese: 素直になれば？)	July 20, 1997
46	"Hurricane Approaching" Transcription: "Harikēn Sekkinchū!!" (Japanese: ハリケーン接近中！！)	July 27, 1997
47	"New Student Shigeru Causes Shockwave!" Transcription: "Tenkōsei Shigeru no Hamon!" (Japanese: 転校生・滋の波紋！)	August 3, 1997
48	"Study Abroad!?" Transcription: "Ryūgaku Suru Shikanai?!" (Japanese: 留学するしかない？！)	August 10, 1997
49	"Our New Relationship" Transcription: "Futari no Atarashī Kankei" (Japanese: 二人の新しい関係)	August 17, 1997
50	"Time to Call It Quits" Transcription: "Mō Oshimai ni Shiyo" (Japanese: もうおしまいにしよ)	August 24, 1997
51	"Neverending" Transcription: "Nebāendingu" (Japanese: ネバーエンディング)	August 31, 1997

== Reception ==
Boys Over Flowers won the 41st Shogakukan Manga Award for the shōjo category in 1996.

By February 2015, the series had over 61 million copies in circulation, making it one of the best-selling manga series of all-time and the best-selling shōjo manga of all time. In April 2023, Guinness World Records has officially certified Boys Over Flowers as having the most published copies of a shōjo manga series written by a single author. On TV Asahi's Manga Sōsenkyo 2021 poll, in which 150.000 people voted for their top 100 manga series, Boys Over Flowers ranked 70th.

== Legacy ==
=== F4 and JVKV ===
F4 (Flower Four) or JVKV was a Taiwanese boy band consisting of cast members of the 2001 Taiwanese version, Meteor Garden: Jerry Yan, Vanness Wu, Ken Chu, and Vic Chou. It formed in 2001 after the Meteor Garden series ended. They released three albums, Meteor Rain (2001), Fantasy 4ever (2002), and Waiting for You (2007). According to Forbes, F4 has sold 3.5 million copies of their first two albums all over Asia as of July 2003. In 2007, due to copyright issues, the group changed its name to JVKV, using the initials of its members in descending order their ages.
