= List of F4 live performances =

F4 concerts
- Concert tours: 4
- One-off concerts: 5

Taiwanese boy band F4 has embarked on four concert tours since their debut in 2001. Their first concert tour, Meteor Garden F4 Music Party, spanned three shows in Taiwan and Singapore. Their first world tour, the Fantasy Live Concert World Tour, was held in 2002 through 2003. In 2025, they embarked on a reunion tour as a three-piece group, titled the F Forever City of Stars Tour, beginning in Shanghai.

== Meteor Garden F4 Music Party ==
The Meteor Garden F4 Music Party was the first tour by Taiwanese boy band F4.

List of tour dates
Date	City	Country	Venue	Attendance
October 20, 2001	Taipei	Taiwan	Neihu Super Dome	—
October 21, 2001	Taipei	Taiwan	Neihu Super Dome	—
January 27, 2002	Singapore		Suntec City Convention Centre	—

== Fantasy Live Concert World Tour ==
The Fantasy Live Concert World Tour was the second tour and first world tour by Taiwanese boy band F4.

List of tour dates
Date	City	Country	Venue	Attendance
November 9, 2002	Shanghai	China	Shanghai Stadium	—
November 13, 2002	Nanjing	China	Wutaishan Stadium	—
November 19, 2002	Chengdu	China	Chengdu Sports Centre Stadium	—
November 22, 2002	Ningbo	China	Ningbo Sports Centre Stadium	—
November 23, 2002	Guangzhou	China	Guangdong Olympic Stadium	—
December 14, 2002	Wuhan	China	Wuhan Sports Centre Stadium	—
December 19, 2002	Hong Kong		Hong Kong Coliseum	—
December 20, 2002	Hong Kong		Hong Kong Coliseum	—
December 21, 2002	Hong Kong		Hong Kong Coliseum	—
December 22, 2002	Hong Kong		Hong Kong Coliseum	—
December 23, 2002	Hong Kong		Hong Kong Coliseum	—
December 31, 2002	Taoyuan	Taiwan	Taoyuan Arena	—
January 10, 2003	Jakarta	Indonesia	Jakarta International Expo	30,000
February 1, 2003	Las Vegas	United States	Mandalay Bay Events Centre	—
February 8, 2003	Uncasville	United States	Mohegan Sun Arena	—
February 9, 2003	Uncasville	United States	Mohegan Sun Arena	—
February 11, 2003	Singapore		Singapore Indoor Stadium	—
February 12, 2003	Singapore		Singapore Indoor Stadium	—
February 14, 2003	Kuala Lumpur	Malaysia	Bukit Jalil National Stadium	28,000
Total				600,000

== F4 Japan Tour 2008 ==
The F4 Japan Tour 2008 was the third concert tour by Taiwanese boy band F4, held in support of the group's video album Precious (2008). It began in Yokohama on October 3, 2008. It attracted a total of 80,000 people across seven shows.

List of tour dates
Date	City	Venue	Attendance	Revenue
October 3, 2008	Yokohama	Yokohama Arena	80,000	NT$200 million
October 4, 2008	Yokohama	Yokohama Arena	80,000	NT$200 million
October 7, 2008	Tokyo	Nippon Budokan	80,000	NT$200 million
October 8, 2008	Tokyo	Nippon Budokan	80,000	NT$200 million
October 17, 2008	Osaka	Osaka-jō Hall	80,000	NT$200 million
October 18, 2008	Osaka	Osaka-jō Hall	80,000	NT$200 million
October 19, 2008	Osaka	Osaka-jō Hall	80,000	NT$200 million

== F Forever City of Stars Tour ==
In December 2025, three F4 members, Jerry Yan, Vic Chou and Vanness Wu, launched a reunion concert tour without Ken Chu. They are joined by Ashin of Mayday.

Date	City	Country	Venue	Attendance
December 19, 2025	Shanghai	China	Mercedes-Benz Arena	50,000
December 20, 2025	Shanghai	China	Mercedes-Benz Arena	50,000
December 21, 2025	Shanghai	China	Mercedes-Benz Arena	50,000
December 22, 2025	Shanghai	China	Mercedes-Benz Arena	50,000
January 9, 2026	Chengdu	China	Phoenix Hill Sports Park	—
January 10, 2026	Chengdu	China	Phoenix Hill Sports Park	—
January 11, 2026	Chengdu	China	Phoenix Hill Sports Park	—
January 12, 2026	Chengdu	China	Phoenix Hill Sports Park	—
March 12, 2026	Shenzhen	China	Shenzhen Universiade Sports Centre	—
March 13, 2026	Shenzhen	China	Shenzhen Universiade Sports Centre	—
March 14, 2026	Shenzhen	China	Shenzhen Universiade Sports Centre	—
March 15, 2026	Shenzhen	China	Shenzhen Universiade Sports Centre	—
March 19, 2026	Wuhan	China	Optics Valley International Tennis Center	—
March 20, 2026	Wuhan	China	Optics Valley International Tennis Center	—
March 21, 2026	Wuhan	China	Optics Valley International Tennis Center	—
March 22, 2026	Wuhan	China	Optics Valley International Tennis Center	—
April 10, 2026	Chongqing	China	Wukesong Arena	—
April 11, 2026	Chongqing	China	Wukesong Arena	—
April 12, 2026	Chongqing	China	Wukesong Arena	—
May 28, 2026	Jakarta	Indonesia	Indonesia Arena	45,000
May 29, 2026	Jakarta	Indonesia	Indonesia Arena	45,000
May 30, 2026	Jakarta	Indonesia	Indonesia Arena	45,000
June 27, 2026	Manila	Philippines	Philippine Arena	21,000
August 1, 2026	Bangkok	Thailand	Impact Arena	—
August 2, 2026	Bangkok	Thailand	Impact Arena	—
August 7, 2026	Kuala Lumpur	Malaysia	Unifi Arena	24,000
August 8, 2026	Kuala Lumpur	Malaysia	Unifi Arena	24,000
August 14, 2026	Singapore		Singapore Indoor Stadium	33,000
August 15, 2026	Singapore		Singapore Indoor Stadium	33,000
August 16, 2026	Singapore		Singapore Indoor Stadium	33,000
September 26, 2026	Hangzhou	China	Hangzhou Olympic Expo Center	—
September 27, 2026	Hangzhou	China	Hangzhou Olympic Expo Center	—
October 6, 2026	Beijing	China	Beijing National Stadium	—
October 7, 2026	Beijing	China	Beijing National Stadium	—
October 17, 2026	Guangzhou	China	Guangdong Olympic Stadium	—
October 18, 2026	Guangzhou	China	Guangdong Olympic Stadium	—
Total				—

== One-off concerts ==
Title	Date	City	Country	Venue	Attendance	Ref.
5.27 Concert	September 28, 2002	Beijing	China	Workers' Stadium	50,000	
F4 Philippines Concert	December 26, 2003	Manila	Philippines	PhilSports Arena	—	
F4 Thailand Concert	August 29–30, 2004	Bangkok	Thailand	Impact Arena	—	
2006 F4 Forever 4	March 22–25, 2006	Hong Kong	China	Hong Kong Coliseum	—	
Tamsui Fisherman's Wharf	January 19, 2008	New Taipei City	Taiwan	Tamsui Fisherman's Wharf	—	
