= Meteor Garden =

Meteor Garden may refer to:

- Meteor Garden (2001 TV series), Taiwanese TV adaptation of Japanese shōjo manga series Boys Over Flowers
  - Meteor Garden II, 2002 sequel of the Taiwanese series
- Meteor Garden (2018 TV series), Chinese remake

== See also ==
- Meteor Rain, spin-off miniseries of the 2001 series.
- Boys Over Flowers (disambiguation)
