= Boys Over Flowers Season 2 (TV series) =

2018 Japanese television drama series

- Also known as: Hana Nochi Hare: Hanadan Next Season
- Genre: Romance; Teen; Drama
- Based on: Boys Over Flowers Season 2 by Yoko Kamio
- Written by: Eri Yoshida
- Directed by: Yasuharu Ishii
- Starring: Hana Sugisaki; Sho Hirano; Tatsuomi Hamada; Taishi Nakagawa
- Country of origin: Japan
- Original language: Japanese
- No. of episodes: 11

Production
- Producer: Katsuyoshi Setoguchi
- Running time: 55 minutes
- Production company: TBS

Original release
- Network: JNN (TBS)
- Release: April 17 – June 26, 2018

Related
- Hana Yori Dango Returns; Hana Yori Dango Final; Meteor Garden (2001, Taiwan); Boys Over Flowers (2009, South Korea); Meteor Garden (2018, China); F4 Thailand: Boys Over Flowers (2021, Thailand)

Boys Over Flowers Season 2 (花のち晴れ〜花男 Next Season〜) is a 2018 Japanese television drama series starring Hana Sugisaki, Sho Hirano and Taishi Nakagawa. It is based on the manga series Boys Over Flowers Season 2, written and illustrated by Yoko Kamio. The series aired on TBS from 17 April to 26 June 2018 every Tuesdays at 22:00.

== Synopsis ==
The story is set ten years after the original F4 graduated. Since their departure, the school has been on a steady decline. Correct 5 (コレクト5) is thus formed at the high school by Haruto Kaguragi and his 4 friends. Their goal is to find deadbeat students and kick them out of the school.

Haruto Kaguragi is the most popular boy at Eitoku Academy. However, he secretly orders self-help items online to become strong. Oto Edogawa is a female student at Eitoku who pretends to be rich in order to fit in when in reality, she is impoverished. She works part-time at a convenience store, but one night, she sees Haruto Kaguragi coming into the store and picking up the items he had purchased. Both are shocked to see each other. The next day, they confront each other and agree to keep each other's secrets.

Much like the original series, Kaguragi ends up falling for Edogawa when she puts him in his place during a party. It is unfortunate for Kaguragi though as Edogawa is engaged to Hase Tenma, the student body president of Eitoku's rival academy, Momonozono.

== Cast ==
Main Characters

- Hana Sugisaki as Oto Edogawa
- Sho Hirano as Haruto Kaguragi
- Taishi Nakagawa as Tenma Hase
- Tatsuomi Hamada as Kaito Taira
- Mio Imada as Airi Maya
- Marie Iitoyo as Megumi Nishidome
- Jin Suzuki as Issa Narumiya
- Keisuke Nakata as Sugimaru Eibi

Cameo Appearances

- Jun Matsumoto as Domyouji Tsukasa (Episode 1)
- Shun Oguri as Hanazawa Rui (Episode 3)
- Shota Matsuda as Nishikado Sojiro (Episode 10)
