= Boys Over Flowers (disambiguation) =

Boys Over Flowers (花より男子, Hana yori Dango) is a 1992–2008 manga series by Yoko Kamio.

Boys Over Flowers or Hana yori Dango may also refer to:

- Hana yori Dango (film), a 1995 Japanese live-action film adaptation
- Boys Over Flowers (2005 TV series), the first season of a Japanese live-action television adaptation
  - Boys Over Flowers 2, the second season of the Japanese live-action television adaptation
  - Hana yori Dango Final: The Movie, a Japanese live-action film which concludes the Japanese live-action television adaptation
- Boys Over Flowers (2009 TV series), a 2009 South Korean television adaptation
- F4 Thailand: Boys Over Flowers, a 2021 Thai television adaptation

== See also ==
- Meteor Garden (disambiguation)
