= Jerry Yan =

Taiwanese actor, model, and singer (born 1977)

- 言承旭
- Born: Liao Yang-zhen; January 1, 1977 (age 49); Taoyuan, Taiwan
- Other name: 言承旭
- Occupations: Actor; singer; model
- Years active: 2000–present
- Musical career
- Origin: Taiwan
- Genres: Mandopop; Hokkien pop
- Instruments: Vocals, piano
- Label: Sony Music Taiwan
- Formerly of: F4

Jerry Yan
- Chinese: 言承旭
Transcriptions
Standard Mandarin
- Hanyu Pinyin: Yán Chéngxù
- Bopomofo: ㄧㄢˊ ㄔㄥˊ ㄒㄩˋ
- Wade–Giles: Yen Cheng-hsu
Hakka
- Romanization: Ngièn Sṳ̀n-siuk
Yue: Cantonese
- Jyutping: jin4 sing4 yuk1
Southern Min
- Hokkien POJ: Gân Sêng-hiok
Eastern Min
- Fuzhou BUC: Ngiòng Sìng Sṳ̆

Jerry Yan (Chinese: 言承旭; pinyin: Yán Chéngxù; born January 1, 1977), born Liao Yang-zhen (Chinese: 廖洋震), is a Taiwanese actor, model and singer. He rose to fame with his role in the TV series Meteor Garden (2001), after which he formed the boyband F4 with his co-stars. His other notable TV series include Loving, Never Forgetting (2014) and Count Your Lucky Stars (2020).

== Early life ==
Jerry Yan was born in Taoyuan, Taiwan on 1 January 1977. He is of Atayal and Hakka descent.

== Career ==
=== 1998-2001: Early modeling ===
Yan became a model after winning both the 1998 TVBS Modelling Competition and Men's UNO modeling competition. He filmed advertisements and starred in various music videos. His acting career began in 2000 with a supporting role in Spicy Teacher.

=== 2001-2004: F4 ===
Yan's breakthrough came in the 2001 Taiwanese drama Meteor Garden and its sequel Meteor Garden II. Yan starred as the leader of four rich, popular boys who terrorize their school (known collectively as the Flower 4, or F4). The drama was a massive success, credited with the establishment of the idol drama genre. Yan, along with the rest of the cast of Meteor Garden, became famous across Asia for their work in the series.

After the series' conclusion, Yan and the other F4 actors Vic Chou, Vanness Wu, and Ken Chu continued to perform together and officially formed the quartet boy band F4. F4 signed a record deal with Sony Music Taiwan and released their debut album, Meteor Rain, in 2001. The following year, they released their second album, Fantasy 4ever.

=== 2004-2009: Solo music career and film debut ===
By the mid-2000s, the members of F4, including Yan, wanted to pursue solo music. In 2004, the members of F4 went on an unannounced hiatus, and Yan released his debut solo album, Jerry for You. The album was awarded one of the "Top 10 Selling Mandarin Albums of the Year" at the IFPI Hong Kong Album Sales Awards, presented by the Hong Kong branch of IFPI. He also won the "Best Album" and "Best Newcomer" (for the Hong Kong/Taiwan region) awards at the China Top Music Awards. The same year, he starred in the Hong Kong romantic comedy Magic Kitchen alongside Andy Lau and Sammi Cheng, marking his film debut. In 2006, Yan starred in the critically acclaimed Taiwanese medical drama The Hospital. It was the first Taiwanese series to be imported by Japan's NHK for broadcast. In 2008, Yan starred in the sports comedy Hot Shot alongside Wu Chun of Fahrenheit and Show Lo.

F4 (officially renamed JVKV due to a copyright challenge) released what would be their third and final album, Waiting For You, on 28 December 2007. Yan joined F4 on a Japanese tour for the album, making them the first foreign artists to host seven consecutive concerts in the country. In 2009, F4 officially announced they were disbanding.

=== 2009-present: Continued success in music and acting ===
In 2009, Yan starred in Starlit, co-produced by China's China Central Television, Taiwan's Jam Entertainment and Japan's Geneon Entertainment. Broadcasting rights to the show were sold to 15 countries. The series also won "Best Overseas Drama" at the Sky Perfect TV Award. The same year, Yan released his second solo album, Freedom. According to Taiwan's G-Music chart, the album is the ninth best selling album in Taiwan in 2009. The Japanese version ranked No. 2 on the daily chart and No. 8 on the weekly chart in Japan's Oricon Chart. He then held a solo concert in Japan; Due to high demand, two additional shows were added. Yan became the only Taiwanese artist to win "Best International Artist" at the Best Jeanist Awards. He also won "Asia's Most Popular Singer" at the Southeast Music Chart Awards. He also won Best Actor at The Best International Foreign Drama Awards. In 2010, Yan starred in the China-Taiwan co-production Down with Love alongside Ella Chen of S.H.E. Despite having its episodes leaked in Taiwan, the series still reached the first place spot on TV show ratings. He then released his third album, My Secret Lover, which included soundtracks of The Hospital and Hot Shot sung by Yan. At the Yahoo! Asia Buzz Awards, Yan was chosen as "Most Popular Taiwan Singer in Korea". He was also named as one of the "Top 10 Singers" in Singapore and Taiwan. He placed 6th on Channel V's Fresh Asia Charts, being the highest ranking for Taiwanese singers.

In 2011, Yan starred in My Splendid Life, a remake of the 2009 Korean hit drama Brilliant Legacy. The series reached 100 million views on Youku, and topped the ratings charts for numerous weeks. The same year, he won Best Asian Star at the Asia Model Awards held in Seoul. In 2012, Yan starred in Taiwan's costume film Ripples of Desire, directed by Zero Chou. In 2014, Yan starred in the romance melodrama Loving, Never Forgetting opposite Chinese actress Tong Liya, playing a single father. The same year, he starred in the Japanese heist film Lupin III: Necklace of Cleopatra based on the manga of the same name alongside Shun Oguri, the lead actor of the Japanese version of Meteor Garden, and Kim Joon, one of the lead actors of the Korean version of Meteor Garden. In 2015, Yan made a special appearance in the highly popular youth movie Our Times as the adult version of the male protagonist, Xu Taiyu. He then starred in the Chinese television series My Best Ex-Boyfriend. In 2019, Yan was cast in the romance film Matchmaking Battle. In 2020, Yan starred in the romantic comedy drama Count Your Lucky Stars alongside Shen Yue. In 2021, he joined the cast of Call Me By Fire as a contestant. In 2023, Yan starred in the romantic drama The Forbidden Flower with Xu Ruohan.

Jerry Yan's singing career regained attention after he returned to musical activities through the F✦FOREVER 1st World Tour. The reunion project brought together three members of F4 namely Jerry Yan, Vanness Wu, and Vic Chou, while Ken Chu did not participate in the tour. The F3 performed in collaboration with Ashin (Vocalist of the band Mayday) who was also involved in the concert's musical production.

The F✦FOREVER 1st World Tour began in Shanghai, China from December 19 - 22, 2025 before continuing to several cities including Chengdu, Shenzhen, Wuhan, and Chongqing. After the concerts in mainland China, the concert tour continued to various countries in Southeast Asia beginning with Indonesia and followed Philippine, Thailand, and Malaysia before concluding in Singapore from August 14 - 16, 2026.

== Personal life ==
Yan was in an on and off relationship with model Lin Chi-ling for many years. Yan admitted to reuniting with Lin on 10 November 2017. This was neither confirmed nor denied by Lin. A year later, however, Yan refused to comment and Lin denied dating.

== Filmography ==
=== Television series ===
Year	Title	Chinese Title	Role	Notes/Ref.
2000	Spicy Teacher	麻辣鮮師	Hong Minglong	
2001	Girl Goes Forward	女生向前走	Ah Guo	Cameo
2001	Meteor Garden	流星花園	Daoming Si	
2001	Meteor Rain	流星雨~道明寺篇	Daoming Si	
2002	Love Scar	烈愛傷痕	Zhang Zilin	
2002	Come to My Place	來我家吧	Cai Yiye	
2002	Meteor Garden II	流星花園 II	Daoming Si	
2006	The Hospital	白色巨塔	Su Yihua	
2008	Hot Shot	籃球火	Dong Fangxiang	
2009	Starlit	心星的淚光	Cheng Yue	
2010	Pandamen	熊貓人	Policeman Chen	Cameo
2010	Down With Love	就想賴著妳	Xiang Yuping	
2011	My Splendid Life	我的燦爛人生	Liu Yuhao	
2014	Loving, Never Forgetting	戀戀不忘	Li Zhongmou	
2015	My Best Ex-Boyfriend	最佳前男友	Li Tang	
2016	Because·Love	真爱就这么难?	Zhuang Daosheng	
2019	Reset Life	未来的秘密	Professor	Cameo
2020	Count Your Lucky Stars	我好喜欢你	Lu Xingcheng	
2023	The Forbidden Flower	夏花	Xiao Han	

=== Film ===
Year	Title	Chinese Title	Role	Notes
2004	Magic Kitchen	魔幻厨房	Guo Keli	
2012	Ripples of Desire	花漾	Scarface	
2014	Lupin III: Necklace of Cleopatra	鲁邦三世：埃及艳后的项链	Michael Lee	
2015	Our Times	我的少女时代	Adult Xu Taiyu	Cameo
2021	Tempting Hearts	有一点动心	Zhou Qiwen	

== Discography ==
=== Studio albums ===
Title	Details
Jerry for You (第一次)	Released: August 20, 2004; Label: Sony Music Taiwan; Language: Mandarin; Format: Studio album (CD)
Freedom (多出来的自由)	Released: June 18, 2009; Label: Sony Music Taiwan; Language: Mandarin; Format: Studio album (CD)
My Secret Lover (我的秘密情人) (New + Collection Album)	Released: January 22, 2010; Label: Sony Music Taiwan; Language: Mandarin; Format: Studio album (CD)

=== F4 albums ===
- Meteor Rain (2001)
- Fantasy 4ever (2002)
- Waiting For You (2007)

== Bibliography ==
- 9314 Man and Boy (Publisher: Yuan Shen Chu Ban She) ISBN 978-9-8613332-4-3

== Awards ==
Year	Award-Giving Body	Category	Work	Result
2004	Mnet Asian Music Awards	Best Asia Pop Artist	—N/a	Won
2005	China Top Music Awards	Best Album (Hong Kong/Taiwan)	Jerry For You	Won
2005	China Top Music Awards	Best Newcomer (Hong Kong/Taiwan)	—N/a	Won
2005	IFPI Hong Kong Album Sales Awards	Top 10 Selling Mandarin Albums of the Year	Jerry For You	Won
2009	Best Jeanist Awards	Best International Artiste	—N/a	Won
2009	South East Music Chart Awards	Asia's Most Popular Singer	—N/a	Won
2009	South East Music Chart Awards	Top 10 Songs	Say I Love You at KTV	Won
2009	The Best International Foreign Drama Awards	Best Actor	Starlit	Won
2011	Asia Model Awards	Best Asian Star	—N/a	Won
2011	CTV'S Asia Top 10 Most Popular Stars Award Ceremony	Asia Annual Popularity Award	—N/a	Won
2015	Philippine's Asian Drama Awards	Best Actor	Loving, Never Forgetting	Won
2023	Harper's Bazaar China Icon of the Year	Charm Icon of the Year	The Forbidden Flower	Won
