= Meteor Rain (album) =

- Hong Kong edition cover

Studio album by F4
- Released: August 28, 2001
- Genre: Pop; R&B
- Length: 45:08
- Language: Mandarin
- Label: Sony Music Taiwan

F4 chronology
Meteor Rain (2001)	Fantasy 4ever (2002)

Singles from Meteor Rain
- 1. "Meteor Rain" Released: August 28, 2001

Meteor Rain (Chinese: 流星雨; pinyin: Liú Xīng Yǔ) is the debut Mandarin studio album by Taiwanese boy band F4. It was released on August 28, 2001, by Sony Music Taiwan. The Hong Kong version of the album is an audio visual CD (AVCD) which includes two music videos.

The album's titular single served as the theme song for the 2001 Taiwanese drama series of the same title.

== Background and release ==
The album is organized in the style of a split album with two tracks by each of the F4 members and two tracks collectively as F4. Meteor Rain was released in Taiwan on August 28, 2001. In the Philippines, the album was released in June 2003.

== Reception ==
The leading track "Meteor Rain", a Chinese cover song of "Gaining Through Losing" by Ken Hirai, ranked at number 11 on the Hit FM Top 100 Singles of the Year chart for 2001.

== Accolades ==
The album was awarded one of the Top 10 Selling Mandarin Albums of the Year at the 2002 IFPI Hong Kong Album Sales Awards, presented by the Hong Kong branch of IFPI. Following the success of their TV series Meteor Garden, the album also received commercial acclaim in Indonesia with sales of more than 300,000 copies.

== Controversy ==
The group's label Sony Music Taiwan encountered controversy in October 2002 when South Korean media noted the similarities between the song "Everywhere" (你不愛我愛誰?) and the popular Korean song "Love and Remember" (사랑해 그리고 기억해), which was originally recorded by K-pop group g.o.d in 1999 as part of their second album and was composed by their producer Park Jin-young. Park filed a lawsuit against Sony Music Taiwan, stating that the song had been remade without his permission. Sony Music Taiwan disputed the case on the grounds that they had purchased the rights from Universal Music, as "Love and Remember" was partly based on Curtis McKonly's arrangement of the Christmas carol "The First Noel". The case was eventually settled out of court when Park was paid compensation by Sony Music Taiwan as they used Park's arrangement of the song.

== Track listing ==
1. "流星雨" liu xing yu (Meteor Rain) – F4
2. "我是真的真的很愛你" wo shi zhen de zhen de hen ai ni (I Truly Love You/I Really Really Love You) – Jerry
3. "Here We Are" – Ken
4. "誰讓你流淚" shui rang ni liu lei (Who Made You Cry?) – Vanness
5. "為你執著" wei ni zhi zhuo (Persistence For You) – Vic
6. "第一時間" di yi shi jian (At The First Place) – F4
7. "要定你" yao ding ni (Got To Have You) – Jerry
8. "你不愛我愛誰?" ni bu ai wo ai shui (Everywhere/Who Do You Love If Not Me?) – Vanness
9. "愛不會一直等你" ai bu hui yi zhi deng ni (Show Me Your Love/Love Will Not Wait For You) – Ken
10. "最特別的存在" zui te bie de cun zai (The Most Special Existence) – Vic

== Charts ==
=== Weekly charts ===
Chart (2001–2005)	Peak position
Japanese Albums (Oricon)	10
Singaporean Albums (RIAS)	1

=== Year-end charts ===
Chart (2001)	Position
Taiwanese Albums (Note: Best-selling albums of the year in Taiwan as reported by media outlets)	4

== Sales ==
Region	Certification	Certified units/sales
Indonesia	—	300,000
Taiwan	—	250,000
Summaries
Asia	—	4,000,000
