= Meteor Garden (2001 TV series) =

Taiwanese television series

- DVD cover
- Also known as: 流星花園; Liúxīng Huāyuán
- Genre: Romance; Drama; Comedy
- Based on: Boys Over Flowers by Yoko Kamio
- Directed by: Tsai Yueh-hsun
- Starring: Barbie Hsu; Jerry Yan; Vic Chou; Ken Chu; Vanness Wu
- Opening theme: "情非得已" ("Can't Help Falling In Love With You") by Harlem Yu
- Ending theme: "你要的愛" ("The Love You Want") by Penny Tai
- Country of origin: Taiwan
- Original language: Mandarin
- No. of episodes: 19

Production
- Producer: Angie Chai (柴智屏)
- Production location: Taipei
- Camera setup: Multiple-camera
- Production company: Comic Ritz International Production

Original release
- Network: CTS
- Release: 12 April – 16 August 2001

Related
- Hana Yori Dango (audio drama, 1993–1994, Japan); Hana Yori Dango (film, 1995, Japan); Meteor Rain (supplementary series); Meteor Garden II (sequel); Hana Yori Dango (2005 adaptation, Japan); Boys Over Flowers (2009 adaptation, South Korea); Meteor Garden (2018 adaptation, China); F4 Thailand: Boys Over Flowers (2021 adaptation, Thailand)

Meteor Garden (Chinese: 流星花園; pinyin: Liúxīng Huāyuán) is a 2001 Taiwanese television drama series broadcast by CTS. The series is based on the Japanese manga series Boys Over Flowers (花より男子, Hana Yori Dango) by Yoko Kamio, inspiring multiple adaptations thereafter. Directed by Tsai Yueh-hsun, it stars Barbie Hsu, Jerry Yan, Vic Chou, Ken Chu and Vanness Wu. It aired from 12 April to 16 August 2001, followed by an original sequel with the same cast in 2002.

A phenomenal success across Asia, the series launched the careers of its four male stars who formed the boy band F4, named after their fictional group in the story, and established Hsu as a lead actress. It is also credited with ushering in the idol drama genre and the golden era of Taiwanese TV shows.

== Synopsis ==
The story centers around a poor teenage girl, Shancai, who goes to a school for rich people at the insistence of her parents. The school is dominated by four rich, handsome but arrogant students—Daoming Si, Huaze Lei, Meizuo and Ximen—collectively known as the F4, short for "Flower 4". They are heirs to four rich and influential families in Taiwan. They terrorize the school by handing out red cards to those they do not like, which allows other students to bully the victims until they leave the school.

After one of Shancai's friends receives the wrath of F4 leader, Daoming Si, Shancai stands up and berates him, which in turn results in receiving a red card of her own. Shancai hates the arrogant and rude Daoming Si. Her persistence in standing up for what is right gradually gains the F4's respect, and Daoming Si begins to fall for her. At first, Shancai is attracted to the silent Huaze Lei, but Daoming Si's constant yet annoying efforts has her question her feelings for the two F4 boys.

Daoming Si's mother arrives in Taiwan, and she instantly dislikes Shancai for her poor background. Both Daoming Si and Shancai face the hurdles his mother throw their way to separate them. Though Shancai does not profess her love for him yet, Daoming Si remains determined. The story chronicles the love between Shancai and Daoming for each other.

== Cast ==
=== Main ===
Drama character	Actor	Manga character	Characteristics
Shancai (杉菜)	Barbie Hsu	Tsukushi Makino	A tough, hardworking girl who defends the weak. Shancai keeps on enduring as her life gets harsher, earning the respect of F4 boys. She likes Huaze Lei at first until she begins to have feelings for Daoming Si.
Daoming Si (道明寺)	Jerry Yan	Tsukasa Domyoji	The stubborn, hot-headed leader of F4. Daoming Si is distrustful of everyone, and he thinks that money can solve anything. He detests Shancai's defiance at first until he eventually falls in love with her.
Huaze Lei (花澤類)	Vic Chou	Rui Hanazawa	A quiet, superior and kindful member of F4, Huaze Lei becomes Shancai's protector and close friend. Daoming Si always rely on him until their friendship had a rift when Huaze Lei falls in love with Shancai.
Ximen (西門)	Ken Chu	Sojiro Nishikado	A fun-loving playboy member of F4, Ximen only dates girls for one week.
Meizuo (美作)	Vanness Wu	Akira Mimasaka	A sensible and loyal member of F4, Meizuo is the group's laid-back joker.

=== Supporting ===
Drama character	Actor	Manga character	Characteristics
Shancai's mother	Moon Wang (王月)	Chieko Makino	A mother who wants to get her daughter married to a rich man. She enrolled Shancai to the F4's school.
Shancai's father	Dong Zhicheng (董至成)	Haruo Makino	A father who has bad luck on his job and is sneaking around on foods. He is often the cause of his family's financial problems.
Xiaoyou (小優)	Rainie Yang	Yuki Matsuoka	Shancai's best friend who becomes attracted to Ximen.
Tengtang Jing (藤堂靜)	Winnie Qian (錢韋杉)	Shizuka Todo	Huaze Lei's close friend and brother-figure.
Li Zhen (李真)	Ye Anting (葉安婷)	Makiko Endo / Sakurako Sanjo	Shancai's only friend at school who later betrayed her.
Chen Qinghe (陳青和)	Edward Ou	Kazuya Aoike	Shancai's childhood friend who secretly has a crush on her.
Daoming Zhuang (道明莊)	Mary Hsu (徐華鳳)	Tsubaki Domyoji	Daoming Si's older sister.
Daoming Feng (道明楓)	Zhen Xiuzhen (甄秀珍)	Kaede Domyoji	Daoming Si's manipulative and controlling mother, who becomes very cruel and abusive towards Shancai.
He Yuanzi (何原滋)	Ke Huanru (柯奐如)	Shigeru Okawahara	A strong-willed girl who is forced into an arranged marriage with Daoming Si by both of their respective families in order to merge their business companies.
Baihe (百合)	Zheng Meidai	Yuriko Asai	Shancai's classmate. After the F4 befriends Shancai, she begins to bully her.
Yamen (亞門)	Lan Cheng-lung	Amon Kunisawa	A part-time research student who was hired by Daoming Si's mother to seduce Shancai.

== Soundtrack ==
Meteor Garden

Soundtrack album by Various Artists
- Released: 14 August 2001
- Genre: Mandopop
- Languages: Mandarin and English
- Label: EMI

Meteor Garden Original Soundtrack (流星花園 電視原聲帶) was released on 14 August 2001, under EMI. It contains thirteen songs, in which ten tracks are English songs. The opening theme song is "情非得已 (Qing Fei De Yi)" or "Can't Help Falling for You" by Harlem Yu, while the ending theme song is "你要的愛 (Ni Yao De Ai)" or "The Love You Want" by Penny Dai.

The track "情非得已" (Cant Help Falling In Love With You) was listed at number 21 on Hit Fm Taiwan's Hit Fm Annual Top 100 Singles Chart (Hit-Fm年度百首單曲) for 2001.

=== Track listing ===
No.	Title	Singer(s)	Length
1.	"Love of My Life" (道明寺傷心之歌)	Queen
2.	"Can't Help Falling in Love with You" (情非得已 (Qing Fei De Yi))	Harlem Yu
3.	"Perfect Moment" (杉菜與花澤類之歌)	Martine McCutcheon
4.	"And I Love You So" (花澤類的成全)	Don McLean
5.	"I Honestly Love You" (告白)	Olivia Newton-John
6.	"When You're in Love with a Beautiful Woman" (道明寺的初戀進行曲)	Dr. Hook
7.	"Lovin' You" (西門的約會)	Minnie Riperton
8.	"Never Surrender" (我是雜草杉菜)	Corey Hart
9.	"Almost Over You" (BYE BYE! 花澤類)	Sheena Easton
10.	"Settling" (杉菜的傷心之歌)	Tara MacLean
11.	"I'll Never Fall in Love Again" (分手)	Emma
12.	"流星項鍊" (鄭鈞╱流星 (Yellow) (Coldplay Cover))	Zheng Jun
13.	"The Love You Want" (你要的愛 (Ni Yao De Ai))	Penny Dai

== Release ==
Meteor Garden aired on Chinese Television System (CTS) (華視) from 12 April to 16 August 2001. A supplementary miniseries called Meteor Rain was produced from 13 September 2001 to 17 January 2002. A sequel Meteor Garden II aired from 11 November – 25 December 2002.

== Legacy ==
=== F4 (JVKV) ===
F4 (Flower Four) was a Taiwanese boy band consisting of Jerry Yan, Vanness Wu, Ken Chu and Vic Chou. The group was formed in 2001 after the conclusion of Meteor Garden, and they had released three albums: Meteor Rain (2001), Fantasy 4ever (2002), and Waiting for You (2007). According to Forbes, F4 had sold 3.5 million copies of their first two albums across Asia as of July 2003. In 2007, the group changed their name to JVKV due to copyright issues. They used the initials of its members in order of descending age.

The group disbanded in 2009, but in 2025, F4 makes a surprise reunion performance at the #5525 Back to That Day Tour headlined by Mayday, though Chu was not invited in the reunion performance due to a contractual dispute.

=== In the Philippines ===
The Filipino dubbing of the series aired on ABS-CBN from 5 May to 25 July 2003, replacing E.T.C. and was replaced by Meteor Rain. It became one of the highest-rated programs on local television and created a massive cult in the country called "the Meteor Garden fever" in Philippine media. Its popularity spawned numerous local parodies of F4 music videos and notable scenes from the series, and prompted television networks to re-air the series in its entirety at least eight times. However, a group of Filipino parents and teachers criticized Meteor Garden for exposing high school students to explicit romantic scenes.

In September 2003, Barbie Hsu, Ken Chu and Vaness Wu visited Manila for a concert at the ULTRA indoor arena (now known as the PhilSports Arena). To prevent the cast from being mobbed by fans, the management of ABS-CBN and the airport security staff used decoy actors wearing wigs escorted by a security detail to "meet" the estimated 700 fans, while the real actors went through the routine immigration and customs inspections with other regular passengers. Two months later, on 6 November, Ninoy Aquino International Airport (NAIA) was placed on high alert in anticipation of Jerry Yan's first visit to Manila. Yan paid a courtesy call to then-president Gloria Macapagal Arroyo at the Malacañang Palace where, according to reports, both the president and Yan had to be temporarily removed from the premises for a few minutes when fans became unruly during a scheduled photo session.

Later, the drama also aired on GMA Network from 9 July to 5 October 2007, replacing GTO Live and was replaced by Meteor Rain.

For more than two decades, Meteor Garden was credited for boosting the popularity of Asian dramas and films in the Philippines, with the Taiwanese, Chinese, Korean and Thai dramas and movies completely occupying all regular time slots on Philippine television networks from early mornings to late nights. The series and its sequel was rebroadcast on ABS-CBN and Jeepney TV from 31 March to 9 May 2014, replacing Kapamilya Blockbusters on ABS-CBN and Rubi on Jeepney TV and was replaced by Meteor Garden II. After the death of Barbie Hsu, the series and its sequel was rebroadcast again on Kapamilya Channel and A2Z, with streaming on iWantTFC from 10 March to 9 May 2025, replacing the rerun of Kapamilya, Deal or No Deal and was replaced by Meteor Garden II.

=== In China ===
Starting on 14 October 2008, Meteor Garden was rebroadcast on Xing Kong. Xing Kong later re-aired the drama, along with Hana Yori Dango (Japan) and Boys Over Flowers (South Korea). Meteor Garden II also aired on the channel, starting on 4 November 2009.
