= Meteor Garden II =

Taiwanese television series

- DVD cover art
- Also known as: 流星花園II; Liúxīng Huāyuán II
- Genre: Drama; Romance
- Based on: Boys Over Flowers by Yoko Kamio
- Directed by: Mingtai Wang (王明台)
- Starring: Barbie Hsu; Jerry Yan; Vic Chou; Ken Chu; Vanness Wu; Michelle Saram
- Opening theme: "絕不能失去你" ("Can't Lose You") by F4
- Ending theme: "煙火的季節" ("Season of Fireworks") by F4
- Country of origin: Taiwan
- Original languages: Mandarin; Spanish
- No. of episodes: 31

Production
- Producer: Angie Chai (柴智屏)
- Production locations: Taipei; Barcelona, Spain
- Camera setup: Multiple-camera
- Production company: Comic Ritz International Production

Original release
- Network: Chinese Television System (CTS)
- Release: 11 November – 25 December 2002

Related
- Hana Yori Dango (audio drama, 1993–1994, Japan); Hana yori Dango (film, 1995, Japan); Meteor Garden (prequel); Meteor Rain (supplementary series); Hana Yori Dango (2005 adaptation, Japan); Boys Over Flowers (2009 adaptation, South Korea); Meteor Garden (2018 adaptation, China); F4 Thailand: Boys Over Flowers (2021 adaptation, Thailand)

Meteor Garden II (Chinese: 流星花園II; pinyin: Liúxīng Huāyuán II) is a 2002 Taiwanese television series starring Barbie Hsu, Jerry Yan, Vic Chou, Ken Chu, Vanness Wu and Michelle Saram. Produced by Comic Ritz International Production (可米瑞智國際藝能有限公司) with Angie Chai as producer and Wang Ming-tai as director, the series is a sequel to the 2001 television drama of the same name, which is based on the Japanese manga series Boys Over Flowers (花より男子, Hana Yori Dango) by Yoko Kamio. It is an original story that was not adapted from the manga, focusing on the theme of amnesia.

== Synopsis ==
The story of Shancai and the F4 boys continues after their graduation. During the group's vacation in Barcelona, Spain, Daoming Si suffers an accident, causing him to lose his memory. He then meets a girl named Ye Sha, the driver of the other car involved in the accident. After a heartbreaking reunion, Shancai vows to make Daoming Si regain his memories.

== Cast ==
- Barbie Hsu as Shancai
- Jerry Yan as Daoming Si
- Vic Chou as Huaze Lei
- Ken Chu as Ximen
- Vanness Wu as Meizuo
- Michelle Saram as Ye Sha
- Edward Ou as Chen Qing He
- Zhen Xiuzhen as Daoming Feng
- Blackie Chen as Xin
- Kingone Wang as Secretary
- Pace Wu as Ying Xiaoqiao
- Lee Kang Yi as Ah Mei
- Janine Chang as Ximen's secretary
- Winnie Chien as Tengtang Jing
- Megan Lai as Mimi

== Release ==
Meteor Garden II aired on Chinese Television System (CTS) (華視) from November 11 to December 25, 2002. It follows an original story penned by writer-producer Angie Chai when the rights to the F4 name were extended.

== Soundtrack ==
- 絕不能失去你 (Can't Lose You) – F4
- 煙火的季節 (Season of Fireworks) – F4
- Broken Vow – Lara Fabian
- I Love You All the Way – Janie Fricke
- Happy – Alexia
- Yo Te Amo – Chayanne
- Blue – Chantal Kreviazuk
- (They Long To Be) Close to You – 歐定興 (Edward Ou)
- Te Quiero, Te Quiero – Chano
- Words – F. R. David
- Blue – Kenny Loggins
- I'll Never Fall in Love Again – Deacon Blue
- When I See You Smile – Bad English
- Doraemon no Uta (Opening Theme Song)
- Concierto de Aranjuez – Chano

== International broadcast ==
In the Philippines, the series aired on ABS-CBN from August 9 to October 31, 2003, replacing Meteor Rain and was replaced by Eternity: A Chinese Ghost Story. It later re-aired on GMA Network from October 22 to December 14, 2007 and again on Jeepney TV from May 12 to July 4, 2014, with the title Meteor Garden II Uncut. The series re-aired again on A2Z and Kapamilya Channel from May 13 to July 25, 2025, and was replaced by the rerun of Kapamilya, Deal or No Deal.

In China, the series was rebroadcast on Xing Kong in early November 2009.
