= Loving, Never Forgetting =

- Official poster
- Also known as: Unforgettable Love
- Genre: Romance; Melodrama
- Based on: Wu Ai Cheng Huan by Lian Bai Se
- Directed by: Zeng Lizhen; Bobo Wang
- Starring: Jerry Yan; Tong Liya
- Opening theme: The Leaf Wilted by Tao Ching-Ying
- Composer: Rynn Lim
- Country of origin: China
- Original language: Mandarin
- No. of episodes: 34

Production
- Executive producers: Liu Zhixue; Deng Jie
- Producers: Song Zhenshan; Xue Lujin
- Production locations: Beijing, China
- Cinematography: Zhang Ziwei; Sun Guo; Xiagui Qing
- Editor: Zhou Yuchen
- Production companies: China Film Co., Ltd. Zhejiang Television

Original release
- Network: ZJSTV
- Release: 23 June – 5 July 2014

Loving, Never Forgetting (Chinese: 恋恋不忘; pinyin: Liànliàn bù wàng) is a 2014 Chinese television series starring Jerry Yan and Tong Liya. It is based on the novel Wu Ai Cheng Huan (无爱承欢) by Lan Bai Se. The series was broadcast by ZJSTV from 23 June to 5 July 2014 for 34 episodes.

== Synopsis ==
Li Zhongmou is a rich businessman who had a one-night stand with Wu Tong a few years ago. He forgot about her until there is an accident in which a young boy was injured. After verification, it was confirmed that the little boy, Wu Tong Tong, is indeed his son.

In order to gain back his son, Li Zhongmou takes Wu Tong to court and tries to win the custody of the boy. However, later, due to his lack of maternal love as a child, he does not want his son to grow up the same way, so he agrees to share custody with her. As time goes on, touched by Wu Tong's intimate relationship with their son and her kindness, Li Zhongmou finds himself falling for Wu Tong. However, Li Zhongmou's rival and half-brother, Xiang Jun also begins to fall in love with her.

Eventually, Li Zhongmou and Wu Tong marry, but they are unable to tell others because of opposition by their families. After experiencing life and death, resentment and prejudice, everyone eventually learns to understand, trust and love. Li Zhongmou and Wu Tong overcome misunderstandings that threaten to ruin their relationship and from separation find their way back to each other.

== Cast ==
- Jerry Yan as Li Zhongmou
- Tong Liya as Wu Tong
- Denny Huang as Xiang Jun
- Wang Yintong as Wu/Li Tongtong
- Feng Jing as Zhang Mandi
- You You as Liang Yueqi
- Wu Yufang as Li Zhining
- Lu Xing as Lin Jiandong
- Liu Xin as Mei Ling
- He Tongsheng as Xiang Yi
- Wang Jianxin as Liang Ruiqiang

== Soundtrack ==
Loving, Never Forgetting - Original Television Soundtrack (恋恋不忘电视剧原声音乐大碟)
No.	Title	Music	Length
1.	"The Leaf Wilted (叶枯过)"	Tao Ching-Ying
2.	"What To Do? (怎么办)"	Zhu Jie
3.	"There is a Me (有一个我)"	Jerry Yan
4.	"I Understand (我懂了)"	Jin Sha
5.	"Can We Start Again? (能不能重来)"	Zhang Yao

== Ratings ==
Air date	Episode	Ratings (%)	Audience share (%)	Ranking
2014.06.23	1-2	0.973	2.75	4
2014.06.24	3-5	0.978	2.84	3
2014.06.25	6-8	1.091	3.17	2
2014.06.26	9-11	1.225	3.56	1
2014.06.27	12-13	1.151	3.51	1
2014.06.28	14-15	1.133	3.40	1
2014.06.29	16-17	1.409	4.04	1
2014.06.30	18-20	1.384	4.03	1
2014.07.01	21-23	1.464	4.18	1
2014.07.02	24-26	1.446	4.19	1
2014.07.03	27-29	1.299	3.73	2
2014.07.04	30-32	1.615	4.58	1
2014.07.05	33-34	1.427	4.28	1
Average		1.277	3.712	/

- Highest ratings are marked in red, lowest ratings are marked in blue
