= Magic Kitchen =

2004 Hong Kong film by Lee Chi-ngai

- Film poster
- Traditional Chinese: 魔幻廚房
- Simplified Chinese: 魔幻厨房
- Hanyu Pinyin: Mó Huàn Chú Fáng
- Jyutping: Mo1 Waan6 Cyu4 Fong2
- Directed by: Lee Chi-ngai
- Screenplay by: Lee Chi-ngai
- Based on: Magic Kitchen by Lam Wing-sum
- Produced by: Lee Chi-ngai; John Chong
- Starring: Sammi Cheng; Jerry Yan; Maggie Q Nicola Cheung; Andy Lau
- Cinematography: Arthur Wong
- Edited by: Kwong Chi-leung
- Production companies: Media Asia Films; Sil-Metropole Organisation
- Distributed by: Media Asia Distribution
- Release date: 5 January 2004
- Running time: 105 minutes
- Country: Hong Kong
- Language: Cantonese
- Box office: HK$20,228,159

Magic Kitchen is a 2004 Hong Kong romantic comedy film directed by Lee Chi-ngai and starring Sammi Cheng and Jerry Yan. The film was adapted from the novel of the same title by Hong Kong novelist Lam Wing-sum.

== Plot ==
Yau became the proprietor and head chef of a successful restaurant since her mother died six months ago. Yau cooks according to the large collection of recipes her mother, who had tremendous talent as a culinary artist but never found success in the restaurant scene due to sexism, created over the years, but has no confidence in herself as a chef. When she visits Japan with her assistant Ho at the invitation of an Iron Chef style cooking show, she has a chance run-in with an old boyfriend, Chuen. Over the next weeks back in Hong Kong, Yau struggles with resurgent feelings for Chuen even as she discovers that one of her best friends has started seeing him. In the meantime, her steadfast supporter and assistant for the last three years, Ho, pushes her to be more bold in her art and experiment. Love and food intersects with surprising twists as she finally decides to leave the past behind and compete in the cooking challenge. In the end, love is the secret ingredient.

== Cast ==
- Sammi Cheng as Mo-yung Yau
- Jerry Yan as Ho
- Andy Lau as Chuen Yao (guest star)
- Maggie Q as May
- Nicola Cheung as Kwai
- Anthony Wong as Tony Ho (cameo)
- Daniel Wu as Kevin (cameo)
- Stephen Fung as Joseph (cameo)
- Michael Wong as Mook (cameo)
- Sheila Chan as Yau's mother (cameo)
- William So as Wine guy in May's party (cameo)
- Jacqueline Law as Kwai's crab dinner guest (cameo)
- Lee Lik-chi as Kwai's crab dinner guest (cameo)
- Vincent Kok as Kwai's crab dinner guest (cameo)
- Clarence Hui as Kwai's crab dinner guest (cameo)
- Michael Tong as Don (cameo)
- Teddy Lin as May's boyfriend (cameo)
- Law Kar-ying as Yau's father (cameo)
- Asuka Higuchi as Presenter of the "King Chef Show" (cameo)

== Release ==
Magic Kitchen was released in Hong Kong on 5 January 2004. In the Philippines, the film was released on 11 February 2004.

== See also ==
- Andy Lau filmography
