= Cat Street (manga) =

Japanese manga series

- Cover of the Japanese volume 1

キャットストリート (Kyatto Sutorīto)
- Manga
- Written by: Yoko Kamio
- Published by: Shueisha
- Magazine: Bessatsu Margaret
- Original run: August 2004 – October 2007
- Volumes: 8
- Television drama
- Directed by: Sasaki Akimitsu; Fujio Takashi
- Produced by: Kurosawa Atsushi; Komatsu Masayo; Endo Satoshi
- Music by: Watanabe Yuichi
- Original network: NHK
- Original run: August 28, 2008 – October 2, 2008
- Episodes: 6

Cat Street (キャットストリート, Kyatto Sutorīto) is a Japanese manga series written and illustrated by Yoko Kamio. It was serialized by Shueisha in the August 2004 to October 2007 issues of Bessatsu Margaret (Betsuma) magazine and collected in eight bound volumes under their Margaret Comics imprint.

It was adapted as a six-episode live-action drama broadcast on NHK between August 28 and October 2, 2008. To commemorate the broadcast of the drama series, Yoko Kamio created an additional manga chapter, which was released as a bonus with the September 2008 issue of Betsuma.

== Plot ==
The story revolves around Keito Aoyama. By age nine she has already become a famous actress when events leading up to the premiere of a musical play cause her to freeze up on stage. In the aftermath of this traumatic experience she abandons acting, withdraws from school and isolates herself from others, including her immediate family, for several years. At age sixteen her life changes for the better after the principal of El Liston, (Note: The name of the free school, El Liston, is derived from the phrase for taking a stroll, promenade, or walking path in the Venetian language.) a free school for people with social issues, accosts her when he finds her aimlessly wandering the streets. Gradually Keito reconnects with childhood classmate Taiyou, befriends new people, such as El Liston students Rei, Kouichi, and Momiji, and enrolls at the free school as she strives to escape from her isolation and starts searching for her own path towards the future. She successfully rekindles her acting career, re-establishes bonds with her family and eventually takes over the operation of El Liston, with the other three former students of the school. Together they continue to guide other people considered "stray cats" by society.

== Characters ==
Keito Aoyama (青山 恵都, Aoyama Keito)
Keito Aoyama is an actress whose childhood acting career ended at age nine after she froze on stage for fifteen minutes. In the aftermath of the incident she withdraws from school and becomes isolated from other people, including her immediate family. At age sixteen she sees no prospects for her future and has become unable to move forward. Her life changes for the better when she meets the principal of a "free school" where students can come and go as they wish. Keito begins to attend the school and befriends three of its students. With their support she overcomes the debilitating influence of her childhood experiences and starts moving forward again. Gradually she re-enters the entertainment industry and forges a new successful acting career for herself.

Kouichi Mine (峰 浩一, Mine Kōichi)
A genius at the age of 18 with an IQ of 200. He's usually seen with a laptop and is a computer geek. He dropped out of school because he thinks it was boring to stay with too many idiots there. Kouichi spends much of his time indoors at the computer lab of the Free School where he can create his computer programs for his job. Because he spends so much time indoors he is quite pale and skinny and doesn't talk much. He's one of Keito's friends.

Momiji Noda (野田 紅葉, Noda Momiji)
A Gothic Lolita. She designs her own clothes and she came to El Liston since she hated having to wear the same thing every day and when she wore one of her Gothic Lolita outfits to school she was shunned by everybody else. When Momiji showed off her sketches to Rei and Kouichi they kindly complimented her and said that they don't know anything about fashion, however Keito sincerely complimented her which started their friendship. She spends much of her time sewing and sketching outrageous outfits with the assistance of Keito.

Rei Saeki (佐伯 玲, Saeki Rae)
A formerly famous soccer player. He said that he was a fan of Keito when she was acting back then and that he watched the incident which ended Keito's acting career. He is also the one that convinced her to attend the free school named El Liston. He becomes friends with Keito. He helps Keito overcome her childhood experiences and encourages her to move forward. He introduces her to Kouichi and Momiji and all become good friends who look out for each other.

Taiyou Harasawa (原沢 大洋, Harasawa Taiyou)
Keito's childhood friend who visited her every day after school following her incident, because she did not attend school. He lives near a park that Keito regularly attends and one day he finally talks to her. Taiyou plays soccer for his high school team and carries the same goal he had when he was younger, to play soccer for Serie A. He recognizes Rei and convinces him to be his team's coach. The team's manager, Hirano, becomes his girlfriend early on in the series, much to Keito's dismay.

Chika Aoyama (青山 知佳, Aoyama Chika)
Keito's younger sister. She wasn't so close to Keito to begin with, but starts to hate her after having to listen to her parents fight. Not wanting to be loner like her sister, she pays people to be her friends. This gets her in trouble but she is silently helped out by Kouichi and Keito who were watching.

Midori Mine (峰 緑, Mine Midori)
Kouichi's step sister. She was Kouichi's first love, though he later finds out that she already has a boyfriend. She invites Keito to her college fair, and Keito performs in the college play. She is really happy when Kouichi finally calls her sis.

Nako Sonoda (園田 奈子, Sonoda Nako)
An actress whose career begins when she is double cast for the same leading role in a musical production with nine-year-old Keito. A friendship starts between the two girls during rehearsals but Nako's admiration for Keito's acting talent turns to resentment. Her actions during the premiere of the play leave the already isolated Keito stunned. After a seven year interval she seeks out Keito again when her own successful acting career reaches a plateau, while Keito has been withdrawn from society altogether during the hiatus. Their encounters as teenagers help both get out of their respective slumps. A bitter grudge and lack of understanding make way for a more friendly professional rivalry.

== Volumes ==
No.	Japan release date	Japan ISBN
1	April 25, 2005	4-08-847847-9
2	April 25, 2005	4-08-847848-7
3	November 25, 2005	4-08-846007-3
4	March 24, 2006	4-08-846042-1
5	August 30, 2006	4-08-846087-1
6	April 25, 2007	978-4-08-846165-6
7	September 25, 2007	978-4-08-846216-5
8	April 25, 2008	978-4-08-846291-2

A bonus chapter, which first appeared in the May 2008 issue of Betsuma, was included in volume eight.

In 2011 Shueisha released a five volume Bunko edition. An additional chapter, first published as a bonus with the September 2008 issue of Betsuma, and an afterword by Yoko Kamio were included in the fifth and final volume of this edition.
