= Ripples of Desire =

- Film poster
- Directed by: Zero Chou
- Produced by: Ding Fan; Hoho Liu; Ning Song; Mimi Wang; Tiffany Zhang
- Starring: Jerry Yan; Ivy Chen; Michelle Chen; Joe Cheng
- Cinematography: Hoho Liu
- Edited by: Chen Po-wen; Zero Chou; Hoho Liu
- Music by: Chen Ming-chang; Lee Che-yi
- Production company: Taiwan Film Culture
- Distributed by: Vie Vision Pictures (Taiwan)
- Release date: December 28, 2012 (Taiwan)
- Running time: 110 minutes
- Country: Taiwan
- Language: Mandarin
- Budget: NT$150 million
- Box office: NT$3.8 million

Ripples of Desire (花漾, Hua Yang) is a 2012 Taiwanese film directed by Zero Chou.

== Plot ==
The story is set on a floating island populated by pirates and lepers off the shores of 17th century Taiwan. There are two beautiful courtesans, White Snow and White Frost, who are the top attraction for at the establishment of businesswoman Moon. The sisters, known as the Rippling Sisters of Flower Street, are known for their flirtatious love duets. Men from everywhere vie for their hearts, ready to deflower them.

Though they are twins, the sisters have very different personalities. While Snow is reserved and unyielding, Frost is wild and rebellious. Both guard a terrible secret. Affected by leprosy, the sisters must inflict a man with the illness to regain their own health.

Meanwhile, a naive young music teacher named Wen arrives at Flower House to teach the girls new opera songs. Snow is told by Moon to inflict Wen, but the kind-hearted Snow, touched by his gentleness and talent, chose to sacrifice herself. Moon then had Frost replace Snow as the stage star and sure enough, Frost became the top courtesan in place of Snow. The ever practical Frost chides and ridicules Snow for jeopardizing everything they've sacrificed so much for. Meanwhile, even though Frost is in love with her platonic childhood friend (Scarface), she chose the rich and lustful merchant, Sir Li.

In order to make her sister give up on her love, Frost plans a grand dynastic scheme to convince Snow that love is a fools game. The scheme entangles them with unscrupulous pirates, a philandering husband, a vindictive wife and kidnappings and murders.

== Cast ==
- Jerry Yan as Scarface
- Ivy Chen as White Frost
- Michelle Chen as White Snow
- Joe Cheng as Wen
- Simon Yam as Master Hai
- Sandra Ng as Madame Moon
- Li Xiaoran as Jen
- Mao Zijun as Sir Li
- Aviis Zhong as Maid

== Reception ==
The film received mixed reviews. It flopped at the box office, merely grossing NT$3.8 million nationwide.
