= Boys Over Flowers Season 2 =

Japanese manga series

- First tankōbon volume cover

花のち晴れ〜花男 Next Season〜 (Hana Nochi Hare: HanaDan Nekusuto Shīzun)
- Genre: Romance
- Manga
- Written by: Yoko Kamio
- Published by: Shueisha
- English publisher: NA: Viz Media
- Imprint: Jump Comics+
- Magazine: Shōnen Jump+
- English magazine: NA: Weekly Shonen Jump
- Original run: February 15, 2015 – December 22, 2019
- Volumes: 15
- Live-action series
- Boys Over Flowers Season 2 (2018)

Boys Over Flowers Season 2, also known as Hana Nochi Hare: HanaDan Next Season (Japanese: 花のち晴れ〜花男 Next Season〜; lit. 'Sunshine After Flowers: HanaDan Next Season'), is a Japanese shōjo manga series written and illustrated by Yoko Kamio. It is a sequel to Kamio's Boys Over Flowers. The series takes place at Eitoku Academy, two years after the members of the F4 have graduated, and introduces a new generation of characters.

The manga began serialization with its first three chapters in Shueisha's digital online magazine Shōnen Jump+ from February 2015 to December 2019, with its chapters collected into fifteen tankōbon. In North America, the manga is licensed by Viz Media.

== Plot ==
Years after the F4 have graduated, Eitoku Academy has not been the same. Due to the recession, there has been a decline in enrollment. Contributing to this is the rise of rival school, Momonozono Academy, that has been taking in more students. A new clique called the Correct 5 now rules the school and has been targeting students whose families have not donated by making them leave school. The leader of the Correct 5, Haruto Kakuragi, is the most popular boy at Eitoku Academy. However, he secretly buys gimmicky self-help items to become strong. Oto Edogawa is a female student at Eitoku who pretends to be rich to, but in reality, she is poor. She works part-time at a convenience store, when one night she sees Haruto Kakuragi coming into the store picking up the items he had purchased. Both are shocked to see each other. The next day, they confront each other and agree to keep each other's secrets.

== Characters ==
Oto Edogawa (江戸川 音, Edogawa Oto)
Portrayed by: Hana Sugisaki
Oto is a girl who transferred into Eitoku Academy during the second semester of second year of middle school, now in her second semester of third year high school. Her family used to be rich, but after her father's company went bankrupt, she pretends to be rich ever since in order to fit in. She dislikes the Correct 5 and their ways. Although Oto initially disliked Haruto, she slowly warms up to him when he saved her from an attempted kidnapping by one of her co-workers. It is revealed the reason she is at Eitoku is that she is engaged to someone and will be married when she turns 18. Her fiancé is revealed to be Tenma Hase.
Haruto Kaguragi (神楽木 晴, Kaguragi Haruto)
Portrayed by: Sho Hirano
The leader of the Correct 5, Haruto is the most handsome and popular boy at Eitoku Academy. Secretly, he worries about being scrawny and usually orders items from magazines and home shopping that do not actually work. When he was younger, he was saved from bullies by Tsukasa Domyoji and has since aimed to be just like him. This also motivates him to rebuild the reputation of Eitoku Academy. He realizes he is in love with Oto after going on a date with her and finding out about her engagement.
Tenma Hase (馳 天馬, Hase Tenma)
Portrayed by: Taishi Nakagawa
The student council president of Momonozono Academy. He is considered a star pupil at Momonozono and the reason why many students are applying there instead of Eitoku. It is revealed that Tenma is Oto's fiancée.
Kaito Taira (平 海斗, Taira Kaito)
Portrayed by: Tatsuomi Hamada
The right-hand man and best friend of Haruto, Kaito is the only one who knows about his secret. He is the intelligent member of Correct 5.
Airi Maya (真矢 愛莉, Maya Airi)
Portrayed by: Mio Imada
Airi is the spoiled sole female member of the Correct 5 whose father owns a shopping mall. She is jealous of Oto hanging around Haruto.
Sugimaru Eibi (栄美 杉丸, Eibi Sugimaru)
Portrayed by: Keisuke Nakata
The athletic member of the Correct 5 who has practiced martial arts since he was a child. His family owns a dojo in Kyoto. Sugimaru is supportive of his friends but rarely knows what is going on.
Issa Narumiya (成宮 一茶, Narumiya Issa)
Portrayed by: Jin Suzuki
Correct 5's resident playboy whose family specializes in ikebana. Similar to Haruto, he idolizes Sojiro Nishikado of the F4 and aims to be just like him.

== Media ==
=== Manga ===
Boys Over Flowers Season 2 is written and illustrated by Yoko Kamio. The manga began serialization with its first three chapters in Shueisha's digital online magazine Shōnen Jump+ from February 15, 2015, to December 22, 2019, with its chapters collected into fifteen tankōbon volumes. Viz Media began publishing an English version the same day it began in Japan as part of its Jump Start initiative. It published the first four chapters in their digital magazine Weekly Shonen Jump before shifting to posting the chapters for free on their website. The manga ended on December 22, 2019, and the fifteenth volume was published on March 15, 2020.

=== Live-action series ===
A Japanese live-action drama series aired on TBS from April to June 2018. It stars Hana Sugisaki as Oto Edogawa, Sho Hirano as Haruto Kaguragi, and Taishi Nakagawa as Tenma Hase. Idol group King & Prince performed the theme song titled "Cinderella Girl" (シンデレラガール, Shinderera Gaaru).

== Reception ==
The first tankōbon volume of Boys Over Flowers Season 2 sold 28,606 copies in its first week.
