= F4 (band) =

Taiwanese boy band

- Also known as: JVKV
- Origin: Taipei, Taiwan
- Genre: Mandopop
- Years active: 2001–2009; 2025–present
- Label: Sony Music Taiwan (2001–2007)
- Members: Jerry Yan; Vanness Wu; Ken Chu; Vic Chou
- Website: Sony Music Taiwan

F4 (Flower Four), later JVKV, is a Taiwanese boy group consisting of Jerry Yan, Vanness Wu, Ken Chu, and Vic Chou. The group was formed in 2001 after their fictional group of the same name in the Taiwanese drama Meteor Garden (2001) propelled them to fame across Asia. Together, they starred in the sequel Meteor Garden II (2002) and released three albums, Meteor Rain (2001), Fantasy 4ever (2002), and Waiting for You (2007). In 2007, due to copyright issues, the group changed its name to JVKV, using the first initials of its members' names in descending order by age. The group disbanded in 2009, but has reunited several times for performances since.

In 2025, the group announced their reunion and embarked on a concert tour as a three-member group without Ken Chu, titled the F Forever City of Stars Tour, beginning in Shanghai, China in December.

== History ==
=== 2001: Meteor Garden and formation of F4 ===
Taiwanese drama Meteor Garden was broadcast in 2001. The series is an adaptation of the Japanese shōjo manga series Hana Yori Dango. Jerry Yan plays the lead role of Dao Ming Si, an extremely arrogant and rich college student who meets his match in the poor but proud girl, Shan Cai (played by Barbie Hsu). Vic Chou, Vanness Wu, and Ken Chu play his friends Hua Ze Lei, Mei Zuo, and Xi Men respectively. In the series, the four boys were nicknamed "Flower Four" due to their handsome appearances. The name was often shortened to F4.

The series was a massive success. Upon its release in April, Meteor Garden propelled all five of its leads to pan-Asian fame. A sequel, Meteor Garden II, was released in 2002. The four male leads kept the name F4 and became a boyband.

=== 2001–2004: Meteor Rain and Fantasy 4ever ===
In 2001, F4 signed a record deal with Sony Music Taiwan. That same year, they released their debut album, Meteor Rain, and in the following year they released Fantasy 4ever. The album includes the Mandarin version of "Can't Help Falling in Love" that they recorded for the Asian version of Walt Disney's Lilo & Stitch soundtrack, a Mandarin version of "Yo Te Amo" by Chayanne, and a Pepsi advertisement theme song "Ask For More".

From 2002 to 2003, F4 held the Fantasy Live World Tour, spanning 19 shows across 12 cities. They garnered a total audience of approximately 570,000 to 600,000 people. In 2003, they embarked on an Asian tour to support Fantasy 4ever, and went on an unannounced hiatus in 2004 afterwards as the members began to focus on their solo careers.

=== 2007–2009: Waiting for You and name change to JVKV ===
On April 29, 2007, Meteor Garden producer Angie Chai announced that the group would no longer be known as F4, due to copyright issues. Japanese publisher Shueisha, who owns the copyright to Hana Yori Dango, allowed the group to use F4 as its band name in 2001. However, as Japan had filmed and aired its own live action version of the manga, the Taiwanese group was renamed to avoid confusion over the name in different countries,. They were renamed JVKV, a name stemming from the initials of each member, by the order of their birth dates from oldest to youngest. However, the name JVKV has never gained recognition, nor has it replaced F4 in popular usage.

Three F4 members appeared in the 2008 drama Wish To See You Again, starring Chou and Chu, while Wu made guest appearances in a few episodes. Due to scheduling conflicts, Yan did not star in the series; his part was played by Kingone Wang. Despite rumors of disbanding, JVKV released their third album, Waiting For You, on December 28, 2007. Their third album still bore the name F4, instead of JVKV. In 2008, F4 held a tour in Japan, making them the first foreign artists to host seven consecutive concerts in the country, which attracted around 80,000 people.

In 2009, F4 announced that they were disbanding.

=== 2010–present: Solo careers and reunions ===
In the immediate aftermath of the announcement, all four of the F4 members pursued solo careers in music, film, and television.

In January 2013, the group was confirmed to perform at Jiangsu TV's Spring Festival Gala in China along with Harlem Yu. The performance was taped in Beijing on January 30, 2013, and was aired on February 10, 2013. During the show, they hinted that they were going to have a concert tour in China, which did not come to fruition. On 30 October 2020, at Jiangsu TV’s "1001 Night Festival" concert, Wu appeared live on stage, while his bandmates’ pre-recorded performances were projected onto the stage via holograms.

On 12 July 2025, F4 reunited for a surprise performance at the Mayday concert 5525 Back to That Day Tour in Taipei, Taiwan. In December 2025, three F4 members, Yan, Chou, and Wu, launched a reunion concert tour. Due to a contract disagreement with F4's management label B'in Music, Chu was not invited to participate (the only of the four singers to be excluded). The tour began in Shanghai, and Ashin of Mayday served as the music producer and chief planner of the tour.

On June 27, 2026, F4 held their F Forever 1st World Tour concert at the Philippine Arena in Manila.

== Members ==
Current Members

- Jerry Yan (言承旭)
- Vanness Wu (吳建豪)
- Ken Chu (朱孝天)
- Vic Chou (周渝民)

== Discography ==
=== Studio albums ===
Title	Details	Peak chart positions			Sales
Title	Details	TWN	JPN	SGP	Sales
Meteor Rain (流星雨)	Released: August 28, 2001 (TWN) April 27, 2005 (JPN); Label: Sony Music Taiwan; Formats: CD, digital download, cassette	—	10	1	Asia: 4,000,000; TWN: 250,000; IDN: 300,000
Fantasy 4ever (煙火的季節)	Released: December 18, 2002 (TWN) July 20, 2005 (JPN); Label: Sony Music Taiwan; Formats: CD, digital download, cassette	—	17	3	Asia: 2,500,000; IDN: 100,000
Waiting for You (在這裡等你)	Released: December 28, 2007 (TWN) February 6, 2008 (JPN); Label: Sony Music Taiwan; Formats: CD, digital download, streaming	2	17	—	
"—" denotes releases that did not chart or were not released in that region.

=== Compilation albums ===
Title	Details
F4 Five Years Glorious Collection	Released: February 21, 2007 (TWN); Label: Sony Music Taiwan; Formats: CD, digital download
Fabulous	Released: September 24, 2008 (JPN); Label: Sony Music Japan; Formats: CD, digital download

=== Live albums ===
Title	Details
Meteor Garden F4 Music Party	Released: January 1, 2002; Label: Sony Music Taiwan; Formats: CD, digital download
F4 Fantasy Live Concert World Tour in Hong Kong	Released: July 1, 2003; Label: Sony Music Taiwan; Formats: CD, digital download

=== Video albums ===
Title	Details
F4 Five Years Glorious Collection	Released: December 18, 2006 (TWN); Label: Sony Music Taiwan; Formats: CD, digital download
Precious	Released: September 24, 2008 (JPN); Label: Sony Music Japan; Formats: CD, digital download
Precious II	Released: February 18, 2009 (JPN); Label: Sony Music Japan; Formats: CD, digital download

== Filmography ==
Year	Title	Role	Notes
2001	Meteor Garden	Yan as Dao Ming Si; Chou as Hua Ze Lei; Wu as Mei Zuo; Chu as Xi Men	Drama series
2001	Meteor Rain	Yan as Dao Ming Si; Chou as Hua Ze Lei; Wu as Mei Zuo; Chu as Xi Men	Mini series
2002	Meteor Garden II	Yan as Dao Ming Si; Chou as Hua Ze Lei; Wu as Mei Zuo; Chu as Xi Men	Drama series
2002	Come to My Place	Yan as Zhong Yi Ye; Chou as Zhong Yuan; Wu as JJ; Chu as Guang Tian Jian	Drama series

== Concerts ==
Headlining tours

- Meteor Garden F4 Music Party (2001–2002)
- Fantasy Live Concert World Tour (2002–2003)
- F4 Japan Tour (2008)
- F Forever City of Stars Tour (2025–2026)

== Awards ==
Year	Awards	Category	Nomination	Result	Ref.
2002	Hong Kong TVB8 Awards	Best Group (Gold)	F4	Won	
2002	IFPI Hong Kong Album Sales Awards	Top 10 Selling Mandarin Albums of the Year	Meteor Rain	Won	
2003	IFPI Hong Kong Album Sales Awards	Top 10 Selling Mandarin Albums of the Year	Fantasy 4ever	Won	
2003	MTV Asia Awards	Inspiration Award	F4	Won	
