= Waiting for You (F4 album) =

Waiting For You

Studio album by F4
- Released: December 28, 2007
- Genre: Pop
- Length: 42:12
- Language: Mandarin
- Label: Sony Music Taiwan

F4 chronology
Fantasy 4ever (2002)	Waiting For You (2007)

Waiting For You (Chinese: 在這裡等你; pinyin: Zai zhe li deng ni) is the third and final Mandarin studio album by Taiwanese boy band F4. It was released in Taiwan on December 28, 2007. The Japanese version of the album was released on February 6, 2008.

== Background ==
The album is organized in the style of a split album with two group tracks and two solo tracks by each group member.

== Release ==
Two versions of the album were released on December 28, 2007, by Sony Music Taiwan: Waiting For You (Await Your Love Edition) (在這裡等你 等待摯愛版) and Waiting For You (Feel Your Heart Edition) (在這裡等你 體驗真心版). A collectable edition was released on February 5, 2008, Waiting For You (Special Collectable Edition) (在這裡等你 新春慶功版) with a 16-page photo booklet and bonus DVD with footage from F4's New Songs World Premiere Showcase (F4全球新歌發表會) at Tamshui Fisherman's Wharf, Taipei, Taiwan on January 19, 2008.

== Track listing ==
1. "體驗" ti yan (Experience) - F4
2. "在這裡等你" zai zhe li deng ni (Waiting For You) - F4
3. "你是我唯一的執著" ni shi wo wei yi de zhi zhuo (You Are My Only Persistence) - Jerry
4. "Listen To Your Heart" - Vanness
5. "殘念" can nian (Nagging) - Vic
6. "愛不停止" ai bu ting zhi (Love Nonstop) - Ken
7. "七天" qi tian (seven days) - Vanness
8. "白" bai (White) - Vic
9. "無所謂" wu suo wei (Doesn't Matter) - Ken
10. "我沒有辦法離開你" wo mei you ban fa li kai ni (I Have No Way To Leave You) - Jerry

== DVD ==
New Songs World Premiere Showcase

- Venue: Tamshui Fisherman's Wharf
- Recorded: January 19, 2008
1. "在這裡等你" (Waiting For You) - F4
2. "殘念" (Nagging) - Vic
3. "愛不停止" (Love Nonstop) - Ken
4. "七天" (seven days) - Vanness
5. "你是我唯一的執著" (You Are My Only Persistence) - Jerry
6. "體驗" (Experience) - F4

== Charts ==
=== Weekly charts ===
Chart (2008)	Peak position
Japanese Albums (Oricon)	17
Taiwanese Albums (G-Music)	3
