= Fantasy 4ever =

Studio album by F4
- Released: December 18, 2002
- Genre: Pop
- Length: 1:00:00
- Language: Mandarin
- Label: Sony Music Taiwan

F4 chronology
Meteor Rain (2001)	Fantasy 4ever (2002)	Waiting for You (2007)

Fantasy Forever (stylized as Fantasy 4ever) (Chinese: 煙火的季節; pinyin: Yan huo de ji jue; lit. 'Season of Fireworks') is the second Mandarin studio album by Taiwanese boy band F4. It was released on December 18, 2002, by Sony Music Taiwan. It includes a VCD which contains two music videos.

== Background and release ==
The album is organized in the style of a split album with two tracks by Vic, one track each by the other remaining members, a duet by Vanness and Ken and six tracks collectively as F4. It features "Can't Lose You" (絕不能失去你) for the opening theme and "Season of Fireworks" (煙火的季節) for the ending theme of the 2002 Taiwanese drama series Meteor Garden II respectively; and the Pepsi advertisement theme song "Ask For More" and a Mandarin version of Walt Disney's Lilo & Stitch theme song, "Can't Help Falling in Love".

Fantasy 4ever was released in Taiwan on December 18, 2002. In the Philippines, the album was released in June 2003.

== Commercial performance ==
The album was awarded one of the Top 10 Selling Mandarin Albums of the Year at the 2003 IFPI Hong Kong Album Sales Awards, presented by the Hong Kong branch of IFPI. The album achieved commercial success in Indonesia, having sold over 100,000 copies within two weeks of its official release.

== Track listing ==
1. 絕不能失去你 (Can't Lose You)
2. 煙火的季節 (Season of Fireworks)
3. 愛的領域 (Love's Terrain)
4. 一個人的冬季 (Lonely Winter)
5. 晴天 (One Fine Day)
6. 當你的朋友 (You As A Friend)
7. Te Amo 我愛你 (Te Amo I Love You) - version of Chayanne
8. 只有我 (Only I)
9. 心理測驗 (Psychological Test)
10. 怎麼會是你 (How Come It's You)
11. Ask For More
12. Can't Help Falling in Love

== Music videos ==
- "Ask For More" MV
- "Can't Help Falling in Love" MV
- "絕不能失去你" (Can't Lose You) MV
- "煙火的季節" (Season of Fireworks) MV
- "愛的領域" (Love's Terrain) MV
- "Te Amo 我愛你" (I Love You) MV

== Charts ==
=== Weekly charts ===
Chart (2003–2005)	Peak position
Japanese Albums (Oricon)	17
Singaporean Albums (RIAS)	3

== Sales ==
Region	Certification	Certified units/sales
Indonesia	—	100,000
Summaries
Asia	—	2,500,000
