= Meteor Rain =

2001 Taiwanese drama

- DVD cover
- Also known as: 流星雨; Liú Xīng Yǔ
- Genre: Romance; Drama; Miniseries; Comedy
- Starring: Jerry Yan; Vanness Wu; Ken Chu; Vic Chou; Rainie Yang
- Opening theme: Liu Xing Yu by F4
- Ending theme: Liu Xing Yu by F4
- Country of origin: Taiwan
- Original language: Mandarin
- No. of episodes: 4

Production
- Producer: Angie Chai
- Production location: Taipei
- Production company: Comic Ritz International Production

Original release
- Network: Chinese Television System (CTS)
- Release: 13 September 2001 – 17 January 2002

Related
- Meteor Garden (prequel); Meteor Garden II (sequel); Boys Over Flowers (manga)

Meteor Rain (Chinese: 流星雨; pinyin: Liú Xīng Yǔ) is a 2001 Taiwanese drama starring Jerry Yan, Vanness Wu and Ken Chu of F4 and Rainie Yang. It is a supplementary miniseries of Meteor Garden which is based on the Japanese manga series Boys Over Flowers, written and illustrated by Yoko Kamio. It was produced by Comic Ritz International Production with Angie Chai being producer. It consists of three stand alone episodes that happened at different times before, during and after Meteor Garden itself. They are referred to as chapters focusing on each F4 members, except for Hua Ze Lei (Vic Chou).

The series was broadcast on free-to-air Chinese Television System (CTS) from September 2001 to January 2002 following the main series Meteor Garden, which was broadcast in April 2001. It was followed by the sequel Meteor Garden II, which was broadcast from 11 November to 25 December 2002.

== Synopsis ==
=== Mei Zuo's Chapter ===
Mei Zuo (Vanness Wu) meets a Japanese girl named Ai Sha, who struggles to survive in Taiwan. She mocks him several times before finally revealing the truth. Ai Sha recently left Japan to find her grandmother and starts to practice dancing together with Mei Zuo. She believes the only way to do this is enter and win a dance contest on television.

=== Xi Men's Chapter ===
Xiao You (Rainie Yang) returns from Canada alone to find love and attempts to rekindle her relationship with Xi Men (Ken Chu), who was not unsuccessful. After meeting him at the bar, the couple confronts each other about their behaviors. Later, Xi Men reveals to Xiao You his past and tells her about this girl, Xiao Gen, he once loved. Xiao Gen had discovered something very special, but had been somewhat afraid of his feelings and had made her disappointed by not showing up. Inspired by the story, Xiao You goes on a time-consuming search for the "special thing" that Xiao Gen had wanted to show Xi Men.

=== Dao Ming Si's Chapter ===
In this two-part chapter, Dao Ming Si (Jerry Yan) is charged with a crime and flees. He almost escapes the police by jumping off a train and lies unconscious on a beach. A young girl by the name of Xin Xin finds him and Dao Ming Si is temporarily taken in by Ah Yuan, who appears to be Xin Xin's father. Ah Yuan and Xin Xin live in a simple shack by the beach and are not wealthy. There are several twists to this plot, the main one being that Xin Xin does not talk. Apparently, Xin Xin is not mute, but simply traumatized by something that happened to her in the past. Thanks to Xin Xin's advances, she and Dao Ming Si quickly bond. However, problems arise in the second part of this chapter when Ah Yuan learns that he is wanted by the police, before Dao Ming Si learns the truth about Ah Yuan and Xin Xin's past.

== Cast ==
- Jerry Yan as Dao Ming Si
- Ken Chu as Xi Men
- Vanness Wu as Mei Zuo
- Vic Chou as Hua Ze Lei
- Rainie Yang as Xiao You
- Senda Aisa as Ai Sha
- Pally Chien as Xiao Gen

== International broadcast ==
In the Philippines, the series aired on ABS-CBN from 28 July to 8 August 2003 replacing Meteor Garden and was replaced by Meteor Garden II. It later also aired on GMA Network from 8 to 19 October 2007.

== See also ==
- Meteor Garden
- Meteor Garden II
