= Ken Chu =

Taiwanese musical artist

- 朱孝天
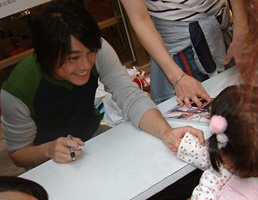
- Chu signing autographs in 2007
- Born: January 15, 1979 (age 47); Taipei, Taiwan
- Education: Boon Lay Secondary School; NEOMA Business School (MSc)
- Occupations: Actor, singer, model
- Years active: 2000–present
- Spouse: Han Wen Wen (m. 2016)
- Musical career
- Origin: Republic of China (Taiwan)
- Genres: Mandopop
- Instruments: Vocals, guitar
- Label: Sony Music Taiwan

Ken Chu (Chinese: 朱孝天; pinyin: Zhū Xiàotiān; born January 15, 1979) is a Taiwanese singer and actor. He is known for his time as a member of Taiwanese boy group F4, as well as his work in solo music, film, and television.

== Early life ==
Chu was born in Taipei, Taiwan. Raised by a single mother, he was sent to Singapore to attend Boon Lay Secondary School. He returned to Taiwan at the age of seventeen.

== Career ==
=== 2001-2005: Breakthrough and F4 ===
Chu worked as a waiter in Taiwan until he was discovered by TV producer Chai Zhiping, who was working on the television series Meteor Garden (2001). Meteor Garden and its sequel, Meteor Garden II (2002), became Chu's breakthrough role. The drama was a massive success across Asia. Today, the series is credited with the establishment of the idol drama genre. Chu and his three co-stars formed the boyband F4, named after the fictional group from the show. F4 signed a record deal with Sony Music Taiwan and released their debut album, Meteor Rain, in 2001. The following year, they released their second album, Fantasy 4ever.

=== 2005-2010: Solo music and acting ===
After F4 released Fantasy 4ever, Chu and the other members decided to pursue their own solo music and alternate creative paths. In January 2005, he released his debut solo album, On Ken's Time. The tracks "永不停止" (Never Stopping) and "La La La" were nominated for Top 10 Gold Songs at the Hong Kong TVB8 Awards, presented by television station TVB8, in 2005.

Outside of music, Chu made his film debut as the lead in Sky of Love (2003) and Tokyo Trial (2006). In 2007, Chu starred alongside Iza Calzado in the movie Batanes: Sa Dulo ng Walang Hanggan, directed by Adolf Alix. In 2006, he released a cookbook, Mei Wei Guan Xi (Delicious Relations) in Taiwan, China, and Japan. He also played the main lead in the Chinese comedy stage play, "Love on A Two Street/He and His Two Wives", which played across China from November 2009 to February 2010.

In February 2007, Chu held his first solo concert in Japan. Later that same year, F4 released their third and final album Waiting For You before disbanding in 2009.. Not long after, Chu had a falling-out with his label over what would be his second and final album, as the label failed to meet the production budget. After his ten-year management contract expired, Chu struggled with depression due to high pressure and intense media scrutiny.

=== 2010-present: Education and social media ===
Chu lived in Beijing, China, where he opened an antique shop, but decided to close it in the late 2010s. In 2014, Chu was enrolled as an undergraduate of Department of Directing at the Beijing Film Academy. Chu graduated with a master’s degree in retail management from the NEOMA Business School in collaboration with University of International Business and Economics in 2019. Chu moved back to Taiwan before the COVID-19 pandemic. In a 2021 interview, Chu stated that he was the “least successful member of F4,” revealing that he had little to no income in Taiwan over the past two years. Chu has primarily focused on creating online content, including travel shows and e-commerce.

F4 reunited in July 2025 for a surprise performance, and announced a reunion concert tour not long afterward. Due to a contract disagreement with F4's management label B'in Music, Chu was not invited to participate (the only of the four singers to be excluded).

== Personal life ==
Chu suffers from fibromyalgia, a condition that causes chronic pain across the body.

From February 2003 to April 2005, Chu was in a relationship with actress Mai Sato until he was photographed having a hotel fling with actress Li Bingbing. From 2006 to 2011, Chu was in a relationship with actress Kelly Lin. In 2015, Chu met Han Wenwen, his co-star on The Dream Come True. They married in 2016.

== Filmography ==
=== Film ===
Year	Title	Role	Production
2003	Sky of Love	Wen Jia Hui	
2006	The Tokyo Trial	Xiao Nan	
2007	Batanes: Sa Dulo ng Walang Hanggan	Kao	
2009	L-O-V-E		
2018	Blue Goldfish		

=== Television series ===
Year	Title	Role	Network
2000	Spicy Teacher	Chen Jia Bao	CTS
2001	Meteor Garden	Xi Men	CTS
2001	Meteor Rain	Xi Men	CTS
2001	Poor Prince	He Fu	CTS
2001	Marmalade Boy	Yuu	CTS
2002	Sunflower	Xiao Long	CTS
2002	Hi Working Girl	Himself	CTV
2002	Come to My Place	Tian Jian	CTV
2002	Meteor Garden II	Xi Men	CTS
2003	Love Storm	Wan Bao Long	CTS
2004	City of Sky	Lu Bin Fei	CCTV
2007	The Legend of Chu Liuxiang	Chu Liuxiang	CCTV-8
2008	Wish to See You Again	Ding Yu Hao 丁雨豪	CTS
2009	Momo Love	Chen Qi	CTV
2011	Remember, About Us	Luo Jia Jun 駱家駿	CTI
2013	Beautiful Temptation	Han Min	
2013	Hero	Fan Li 范蠡	CTS
2014	Youth Without Limit	Cai Ming Zhen	CNTV
2015	The Dream Come True		Guizhou TV
2015	Gorgeous Workers	Zhong Ping 仲平	JSTV, HunanTV, SZTV
2017	The Times We Had	Chun Yuqiu 淳于秋	Dragon TV, Zhejiang TV
2025	Justice Bao	Bao Zheng 包拯	Channel 3, Tencent Penguin Pictures

== Discography ==
=== Studio albums (solo) ===
Album #	Album Info	Track listing
1st	On Ken's Time (永不停止): Format: Studio album (CD); Released: January 7, 2005; Label: Sony Music Taiwan; Language: Mandarin; Genre: Mandopop	1. "永不停止"; 2. "可是我"; 3. "La La La"; 4. "一個好人"; 5. "一個壞人"; 6. "黑白"; 7. "兄弟姐妹"; 8. "中計"; 9. "傻情人"; 10. "復活"; 11. "領悟"; 12. "帶我離開"
2nd	Getting Real (New Songs + Collection): Format: Studio album (2CD); Released: January 6, 2009; Label: Sony Music Taiwan; Language: Mandarin; Genre: Mandopop	CD 1: 1. "走出昨天"; 2. "問號?"; 3. "錯了路"; 4. "好心情"; 5. "Rain"; 6. "愛不停止" (Special Collectable Version); CD 2: 1. "愛不會一直等你"; 2. "聽見愛"; 3. "Inside of my Guitar"; 4. "一個好人"; 5. "無所謂"; 6. "黑白"; 7. "可是我"; 8. "永不停止"; 9. "Here We Are"; 10. "復活"; 11. "中計"; 12. "領悟"; 13. "傻情人"; 14. "晴天"; 15. "帶我離開"
3rd	No Limits: Format: Studio album (CD); Released: September 3, 2019; Label: Earth Entertainment; Language: Mandarin; Genre: Mandopop	1. "啟點 (Qi Dian) Breaking Point"; 2. "謎 (Mí) Puzzle"; 3. "萬水千山 (Wàn Shuǐ Qiān Shān) Thousands of Rivers and Mountains"; 4. "每當我想起你 (Měi Dāng Wǒ Xiǎng Qǐ Nǐ) Whenever I Think Of You"; 5. "Heat of the night" 6. "驕傲 (Jiāo Ào) Pride"; 7. "馬賽克 (Mǎ Sài Kè) Mosaic"; 8. "最美的新娘 (Zuì Měi De Xīn Niáng) The Most Beautiful Bride"; 9. "冲撞 (Chōng Zhuàng) Collision"

Soundtrack

- 2003 – Love Storm – "Inside of My Guitar"

=== F4 albums ===
Album #	Album Info	Track listing
1st	Meteor Rain (流星雨): Format: Studio album (CD); Released: August 28, 2001; Label: Sony Music Taiwan; Language: Mandarin; Genre: Mandopop	1. Here We Are; 2. 愛不會一直等你 – (ai bu hui yi zhi deng ni / Love Will Not Wait For You)
2nd	Fantasy 4ever (煙火的季節): Format: Studio album (CD); Released: December 18, 2002; Label: Sony Music Taiwan; Language: Mandarin; Genre: Mandopop	1. 晴天 – (qing tian / One Fine Day); 2. 當你是朋友 (dang ni shi peng you / You As A Friend) – Vanness and Ken
3rd	Waiting for you (在這裡等你): Format: Studio album (CD); Released: December 28, 2007; Label: Sony Music Taiwan; Language: Mandarin; Genre: Mandopop	1. 愛不停止 (ai bu ting zhi / Love Nonstop); 2. 無所謂 (wu suo wei / Doesn't Matter)

== Bibliography ==
- Mei Wei Guan Xi (Delicious Relations) – cookbook
- With F4
  - F4@Tokyo – 2005 photobook
  - Comic Man – The First Anniversary of F4 – 2002 photobook
  - Meteor in Barcelona – 2002 photobook
  - F4 Music Party – 2001 photobook

== Endorsements ==
- Qingdao Beer (2002, Taiwan)
- Acer Mobile Phones (2000, Taiwan)
- With F4
  - Pepsi – 2002~2005 Taiwan, Hong Kong, China
  - YAMAHA – 2003 South East Asia
  - S&K – 2002–2006 Taiwan, Hong Kong, China
  - Asgard On-line Game – 2003 Taiwan
  - Mingle Sneakers – 2002 Hong Kong
  - Lenovo computer – 2002 China
  - Lupiao Shampoo – 2002 China
  - Chinesegamer On-line Game – 2001 Taiwan
  - Siemens 2118 – 2001 Taiwan

== Concerts ==
- 2008 KEN CHU CONCERT 2009 ~Freedom~ March 21–22, 2009 Tokyo, Japan / March 24, 2009 Osaka, Japan
- 2008 [I-KEN] 2nd Solo Concert March 8–9, 2008 Tokyo, Japan
- 2007 [I-KEN] 1st Solo Concert February 24–25, 2007 Tokyo, Japan
- F4 Forever 4 – March 22–25, 2006 Hong Kong
- On Ken's Time Mini Concert – 2005 Hong Kong
- F4 Bangkok Fantasy – 2004 Thailand
- F4 Happy New Year 2004 – 2003 Philippines
- The Event (with Vanness and ASOS) – 2003 Philippines
- Fantasy F4ever Live Concert World Tour – 2002~2003 Taiwan, Hong Kong, Malaysia, Indonesia, Singapore, China and the U.S.
- F4 Music Party – 2001 Taiwan
