= Hana yori Dango (film) =

- Hana yori Dango DVD cover (feat. Yuki Uchida)
- Directed by: Yasuyuki Kusuda
- Starring: Yuki Uchida
- Production company: Fuji Television
- Distributed by: Toei Company
- Release date: August 19, 1995 (Japan)
- Running time: 78 minutes
- Language: Japanese
- Box office: ¥420 million

Hana yori Dango (Japanese: 花より男子) is a Japanese film released on August 19, 1995, directed by Yasuyuki Kusuda. It is based on the manga series, Boys Over Flowers (花より男子, Hana yori Dango), written and illustrated by Yoko Kamio. It is the first of the many adaptations of the comics for the screen and the first of Fuji TV and Toei's Our Movie Series. It stars Yuki Uchida as the main character of Tsukushi Makino.

== Cast ==
- Yuki Uchida as Tsukushi Makino
- Shosuke Tanihara as Tsukasa Domyoji
- Naohito Fujiki as Rui Hanazawa
- Koichi Hashizume as Akira Mimasaka
- Kensaku Saeki as Sojiro Nishikado
- Kaori Sakagami as Sakurako Sanjo
- Marie Eguro as Shizuka Todo
- Norika Fujiwara as Minako Yamano
- Akari Tonegawa as Yuriko Asai
- Ai Sasamine as Yuki Matsuoka
- TRF (cameo)

== Songs ==
- Opening theme: "Baby's Growing Up" by Yuki Uchida.
- Ending theme: "Overnight Sensation (Jidai wa Anata ni Yudaneteru)" by TRF.
