= Yoko Kamio =

Japanese manga artist and writer (born 1966)

Yōko Kamio 神尾 葉子
- Born: June 29, 1966 (age 60) Tokyo, Japan
- Area: Manga artist
- Notable works: Boys Over Flowers; Cat Street
- Awards: Shogakukan Manga Award (1996)

Yōko Kamio (神尾 葉子, Kamio Yōko; born June 29, 1966) is a Japanese manga artist. Her best known series Boys Over Flowers (花より男子, Hana Yori Dango), for which she received the Shogakukan Manga Award in 1996, is one of the best-selling manga series of all time and the best-selling shōjo manga of all time. Her work has been translated and distributed in Asia, Europe, and North America.

== Biography ==
=== Boys Over Flowers ===
Boys Over Flowers was serialized in Shueisha's bi-weekly Margaret magazine from October 1992 to September 2003 and was collected into 37 volumes. The manga has been licensed by Viz Media for publication in the United States. It has also been published by Glénat in France and by Planeta DeAgostini in Spain. In July 2006, a short story based on the manga was published in issue 15 of Margaret magazine. Another two-installment short story was published in January 2007.

Kamio had no intention of becoming a professional manga artist when she was young, opting to be a waitress instead. Kamio originally went to secretarial school after graduating, but her love of drawing soon led her astray. She then eventually entered the professional manga artist field in 1989. In the following years, Kamio published Suki Suki Daisuki, Ano Hi ni Aitai, and Meri-san no Hitsuji in Margaret before she finally created Boys Over Flowers in 1992.

The Boys Over Flowers manga became established relatively quickly in Japan. Many people commended Kamio for her realistic portrayal of high school life and everyday violence through the Boys Over Flowers series. Although she was initially surprised by the confessions of high school violence stated in fan letters, she realized that Tsukushi's fiery character served as a role model for much of Japan's youth and helped others cope with school violence. Kamio watched as the success of Boys Over Flowers's 1992 début followed through with many more months on the best-sellers list. Voice CDs by SMAP and a live action movie about Hanadan charted the series success in the mid-1990s. By 1995, an animated series was already in progress and Kamio had also helped pick main leads for the anime show.

Boys Over Flowers ran in the Japanese Margaret magazine as well as the Korean magazine Wink. The series has also been published in Japanese, Mandarin, Cantonese, Thai, Korean, French and English. The anime series has been broadcast in Japan, Hong Kong, Taiwan, Singapore, Italy, and has also been licensed and released in the United States. Additionally, it was also recreated in a Game Boy Color game (only released in Japan) during the summer of 2001. With its ever-increasing popularity, It was then made into a popular live action TV series in Taiwan titled Meteor Garden. The manga series finally ended in Margaret August 2003 issue, and the 36th tankōbon which included the Akira special "Night of the Crescent Moon" was released in January 2004 as the manga's final volume. Despite Boys Over Flowers's success, Kamio had originally planned to end the series by Spring 2000. However, in February 2000, at a manga artist conference in Taipei, Kamio announced that she would continue writing Boys Over Flowers. At one point, she got so wrapped up in the storyline, that she confessed to having dreams about Doumyouji.

=== After Boys Over Flowers ===
Kamio's next project, Cat Street, was another manga series of drama/romance published by Shueisha. In it she tells the story about a former child actress who starts attending an alternative school after years of withdrawal from society. The protagonist subsequently rebuilds her life and rekindles her acting career. Cat Street was serialized in monthly Bessatsu Margaret (Betsuma) from the August 2004 issue of the magazine onward and collected into eight tankōbon volumes, the first of which was released on April 25, 2005, and the last on April 25, 2008. A live-action television drama adaptation was aired by NHK in October that same year.

A one-shot sequel story to Boys Over Flowers was published in the 2006 issue 15 of Margaret magazine, showing an update on the adventures of the main characters Tsukushi Makino and the F4. In one of the first volumes of Cat Street, Yoko Kamio had stated that she was planning a sequel to Boys Over Flowers. Kamio's next series was Matsuri Special, which debuted in the first issue (November 2007) of Jump Square, a shōnen manga magazine. It is about a high school girl whose father has trained her to become a female professional wrestler. One of her later series was Tora to Okami which ran in Betsuma magazine from 2010 to 2011. Another series was Ibara no Kanmuri which ran from 2013 to 2014.

== Works ==
=== Manga ===
- Ano Hi ni Aitai (1989)
- Sayonara o Arigatō (1989)
- Suki Suki Daisuki (1990)
- Merii-san no Hijitsu (1991–1992, 5 volumes)
- Boys Over Flowers (1992–2003, 37 volumes)
- Cat Street (2004–2007, 8 volumes)
- Matsuri Special (2008–2009, 4 volumes)
- Tora to Okami (2009–2012, 6 volumes)
- Crown of Thorns (2013–2014, 2 volumes)
- Boys Over Flowers Season 2 (2015–2019)

=== Other ===
- Love Through a Prism (anime, 2026, 20 episodes)
