= Vanness Wu =

American-born Taiwanese actor, model, singer, director, and producer

- 吳建豪
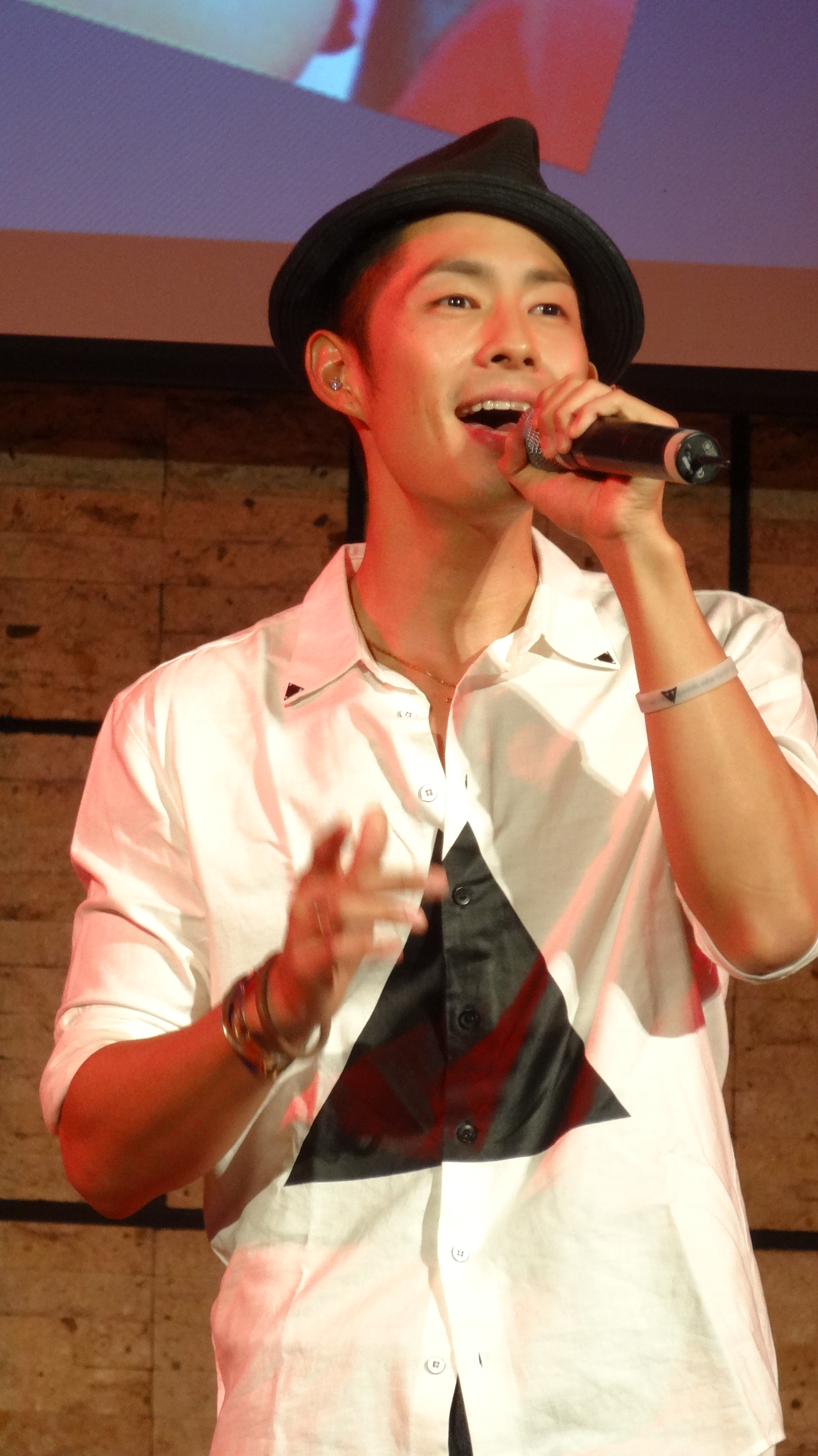
- Wu at the Joyful Family Music Event in 2012
- Born: August 7, 1978 (age 48); Santa Monica, California, U.S.
- Citizenship: United States; Taiwan
- Occupations: Singer; actor; dancer; director; producer; model; songwriter; spokesperson
- Years active: 2001–present
- Spouse(s): Arissa Cheo (m. 2013; div. 2018) Emi Aramaki (m. 2026)
- Musical career
- Origin: Taiwan
- Genres: Mandopop; R&B; dance; Taiwanese hip hop; Chinese hip hop; J-pop
- Labels: Sony; Pony Canyon; Universal; Virgin
- Formerly of: F4; Kangta & Vanness
- Website: Vanness Wu on Facebook

Vanness Wu (Chinese: 吳建豪; pinyin: Wú Jiànháo; born August 7, 1978) is a Taiwanese-American singer and actor. He was a member of the Taiwanese boyband F4 and the Korean Mandopop duo Kangta & Vanness.

== Early life ==
Vanness Wu was born in Santa Monica, California to Taiwanese immigrant parents, George Wu and Mimi Yang. He was named after Van Nuys Boulevard, where he and his parents used to live. After graduating Corona del Mar High School in Newport Beach, California, he moved to Taiwan to pursue a career in entertainment. He learned to breakdance as a teenager and competed in numerous dance competitions throughout the '90s and featured in the 1998 breakdancing-themed music video for Jason Nevins' remix of Run-D.M.C.'s "It's Like That".

== Career ==
=== Early career with F4 ===
Wu starred as Mei Zuo (美作), one of the F4 members, in the Taiwanese drama series Meteor Garden and its sequel, Meteor Garden II. At the conclusion of the series, they continued to perform together and released three studio albums as the boy band F4. In 2002, Wu became the second F4 member, after Vic Chou, to release his debut solo album, Body Will Sing. The track, "I Hate Myself" is listed at number 95 on Hit Fm Taiwan's Hit Fm Annual Top 100 Singles Chart for 2002. The album was awarded as one of the "Top 10 Selling Mandarin Albums of the Year" at the 2002 IFPI Hong Kong Album Sales Awards, presented by the Hong Kong branch of IFPI.

In 2003, he performed a Mandarin Chinese rap in a version Beyoncé's single "Crazy in Love", featured on the Asian special edition of her album Dangerously in Love.

In 2004, Wu made his film debut in the Hong Kong film Star Runner and was nominated at the Hong Kong Film Awards for Best Newcomer.

In 2006, he collaborated with Korean singer Kangta, forming Kangta & Vanness. The duo released the album Scandal.

In 2008, Wu was announced as the opening act and special guest for Kanye West's "Glow in the Dark" concert in Shanghai. They performed the hit song "Good Life".

=== Solo career ===
Wu has appeared in several Taiwanese dramas as well as motion pictures. In 2009, he starred as Ren Guang Xi in Autumn's Concerto, one of the highest-rated Taiwanese idol drama. He also released his first Japanese single "Only", which entered Top 10 of the Oricon Chart, as well as another single "I Don't Wanna Lose You".

Wu's third Chinese solo album C'est La V was released July 2011 under Universal Music Taiwan. It features collaborations with international artistes such as Ryan Tedder from OneRepublic, as well as Bruno Mars and Justin Michael who wrote the track "Knockin".

Wu is also the creator/designer of his own designer label 3.V.O.7.

In 2012, Wu won the "Best Crossover Singer" at the 16th Chinese Global Music Charts.

In 2013, Wu joined Jiangsu TV's diving variety show Stars in Danger: The High Dive, and won the silver medal.

In January 2015, Wu was announced to be one of the judges of the talent show Asia's Got Talent, along with Indonesian-French singer Anggun, Canadian musician David Foster, and former Spice Girls member Melanie C, which aired from March to May on AXN Asia.

In July 2015, Wu returned to the Philippines after a decade of his first visit for the special show for the #LiveinLevis event sponsored by Levi's in line with the launch of the Women's Denim Collection for Fall 2015. Wu's performance was a way of thanking the brand's fans and style seekers.

In 2016, it was announced that Wu would star in his first Chinese television series The Princess Weiyoung alongside Tiffany Tang, playing the 5th century prince and then Emperor Tuoba Yu of the Northern Wei Dynasty. He was also in the science fiction film Pili Back. In the same year, he participated with his sister Melody in the third season of The Amazing Race China, based on CBS's reality program of the same name, where they were eliminated on the ninth leg and finished 4th.

In 2019, he starred in Ip Man 4: The Finale alongside Donnie Yen where he played Hartman Wu, a U.S. Marine Corps Staff Sergeant and Bruce Lee's student.

In 2018, he established his own footwear brand called xVessel.

In 2026, Wu reunited with his fellow F4 members for their first world tour, F✦FOREVER 1st World Tour, at Chengdu and Wuhan in China, Jakarta in Indonesia, Bulacan in Philippines, Bangkok in Thailand, Kuala Lumpur in Malaysia, and Singapore.

=== Musical style ===
Wu's albums are composed of a majority of dance tracks, although he did include a handful of soothing ballads. A number of songs, such as the upbeat "Never Let You Go", bear nostalgic reminders of 90s pop genre, although it is predominantly Western hip-hop in quality. A musical arts research analysis published at jstor.org has contrasted and compared this track with the works of a fellow contemporary Asian-American artiste, Leehom Wang, who also has an established fan-base and following in East-Asia.

== Personal life ==
Wu and Taiwanese actress Vivian Hsu had previously dated from 2002 to 2005.

Wu first met Singaporean actress and socialite Arissa Cheo in California in 2006, Cheo was also a heiress to the million-dollar palm oil refiner business Mewah Group. Cheo would later went to become an entrepreneur in 2009. Wu and Cheo were officially married November 7, 2013 and held wedding ceremonies in Los Angeles on November 15, 2013 and in Singapore on January 5, 2014 respectively.

In May 2018, Wu filed for divorce, citing they had been living separately for the last three years, which Cheo refused to sign. Wu filed again in June 2018, with amended reason citing irreconcilable differences and Cheo's lack of support for Wu's career. Both of them eventually signed the agreement in December of the same year, and their divorce was officially finalized in February 2019.

In early May 2026, Wu secretly had a marriage in Las Vegas. Two days after F4's reunion concert in the Philippines, Wu announced his remarriage in his Instagram account on June 29, 2026 without identifying his new wife, which led to speculations. Taiwanese news ETtoday reported that his new wife was the Japanese singer Emi Aramaki on the following day on June 30, 2026 and was confirmed by Wu's agency B'in Music.

== Filmography ==
=== Television series ===
Year	English title	Chinese title	Role	Notes
2001	Meteor Garden	流星花園	Mei Zuo	Live-action adaptation of Japanese manga Boys Over Flowers
2001	Meteor Rain	流星雨	Mei Zuo	Mei Zuo's chapter
2001	Peach Girl	蜜桃女孩	Ah Li	Live-action adaptation of Japanese manga Peach Girl
2002	Meteor Garden II	流星花園2	Mei Zuo	
2002	Come to My Place	來我家吧	JJ	Live-action adaptation of Japanese manga Uchi ni Oideyo by Hidenori Hara
2004	Say Yes Enterprise	求婚事務所	Song Zhenkai	Story 01: Cinderella
2008	Wish to See You Again	這裡發現愛	Leo	
2009	Autumn's Concerto	下一站,幸福	Ren Guang Xi	
2011	Material Queen	拜金女王	Cai Jiahao	
2012	Ti Amo Chocolate	愛上巧克力	Fang Jiahua	
2016	The Princess Weiyoung	锦绣未央	Tuoba Yu	
2018	Love Won't Wait	如果，爱	Song Qiaozhi	

=== Film ===
Year	Title	Alternate	Role	Notes
2003	Star Runner	少年阿虎; The Kumite (Canada, USA)	Bond Cheung (Zheng Jianbang)	Film debut Nominated―Hong Kong Film Awards for Best Newcomer
2005	Dragon Squad	猛龍; Dragon Heat (USA)	Wang Sun-ho	
2006	Cars	汽車總動員	Lightning McQueen	Voice-acting, Taiwanese version only.
2007	Kung Fu Fighter	功夫無敵	Ma Li	
2008	Three Kingdoms: Resurrection of the Dragon	三國之見龍卸甲	Guan Xing	
2009	LaMB		Dr. Jack Griswold	English voice-acting.
2009	Kung Fu Chefs	功夫廚神	Long Jianyi	
2010	The Haunting Lover	借室還魂	Liang Guang	
2010	1040 Movie		Himself	Exclusive interview.
2011	The Road Less Traveled	樂之路	Mike	Produced by Smash and Grab (co-founded by Vanness).
2012	Baseballove	球愛天空	Lin Chenghui	
2013	Machi Action	變身		Cameo appearance.
2014	Girls	閨蜜	Sky (Jiu Tian)	
2015	Dragon Blade	天將雄獅		Cameo appearance.
2015	Monk Comes Down the Mountain	道士下山	Cui Daorong	
2016	Lulu the Movie	露露的电影	Himself	Exclusive interview.
2016	Birth of the Dragon		Sonny Lo	
2017	A-Choo	打噴嚏		Alternative title: My Lover is a Superman (我的情敌是超人).
2017	Pili Back	霹雳再现		
2019	Undercover Punch and Gun		Hou Wu	
2019	Ip Man 4: The Finale	葉問4	Hartman Wu	

=== Variety and reality show ===
Year	English title	Chinese title	Notes
2013	Stars in Danger: The High Dive	星跳水立方	Diving variety show Qualified into finals
2015	Asia's Got Talent	—N/a	Judge (Season 1)
2016	The Amazing Race China 3	极速前进第三季	With sister Melody
2019	Street Dance of China	就是街舞	Judge (Season 2)
2022	Call Me by Fire	披荊斬棘	Season 2

== Discography ==
=== Studio album ===
Album#	Title	Track List	Notes
1st	Body Will Sing (身體會唱歌): Released: September 19, 2002; Label: Sony Music Taiwan; Language: Mandarin; Format: Studio album (CD); Genre: Mandopop; Countries: Taiwan, Hong Kong, Japan	1. 序曲; 2. 尋找茱麗葉; 3. My Friend; 4. 我討厭我自己; 5. 身體會唱歌; 6. 寂寞廣場; 7. Sick; 8. 想像十個你; 9. 那個女生; 10. 午夜場的電影; 11. 因為太愛你); 12. Can't Help Falling in Love (by F4)	"CD + CD Extra" version also featured "Ask for More" by F4
2nd	V.DUBB: Released April 20, 2007; Label: Sony Music Taiwan; Language: Mandarin; Format: Studio album (CD); Genre: Mandopop; Countries: Taiwan, Hong Kong, Japan, South Korea	1. 我的王國; 2. Never Let You Go; 3. 放手; 4. Just One Dance; 5. Friday Night; 6. 幻想這愛; 7. 零時差; 8. 媽媽; 9. 如果; 10. Eternity; 11. 幻想這愛 (中文混音版) [Remix Version]	Japanese release featured a Japanese version of "Wanna Love Somebody" as Track 11, plus a Japanese version of "Wanna Love Somebody (Justin Michael Remix)" as Track 12
3rd	In Between (New + Best Selection): Released July 1, 2008; Label: Sony Music Taiwan; Language: Mandarin; Format: Studio album (CD); Genre: Mandopop	1. 我不是自己; 2. Lucky Me; 3. 自己的節奏; 4. 我討厭我自己; 5. 午夜場的電影; 6. 零時差; 7. 尋找茱麗葉; 8. 我的王國; 9. 放手; 10. 想像十個你; 11. Never Let You Go; 12. Listen to Your Heart; 13. 誰讓妳流淚; 14. 因為太愛你; 15. 媽媽	
4th	Reflections: Released February 3, 2010; Language: Japanese; Label: Pony Canyon; Format: Studio album (CD); Genre: J-pop	1. Hyper Car; 2. Kodoku; 3. Stuck on U 4. Reason; 5. Purple Rain; 6. I Don't Wanna Lose You; 7. Only; 8. Super Model (English); 9. Sail Away (English); 10. Devil (English)	First Japanese album
5th	V: Released April 27, 2011; Language: Japanese; Label: Pony Canyon; Format: Studio album (CD); Genre: J-pop	1. Break Out!; 2. Mission; 3. Why; 4. No More Tears; 5. Soldier; 6. Better; 7. Shine On (Plasmo` Electric Mix); 8. Love Will Come	Second Japanese album Better was written by Bruno Mars
6th	C'est La V: Released July 15, 2011; Language: Mandarin; Label: Universal Music Taiwan; Format: Studio album (CD); Genre: Mandopop	1. Intro; 2. 說愛就愛; 3. Is This All feat. Ryan Tedder of OneRepublic; 4. Do it feat. 仔仔; 5. 命定; 6. 有你在; 7. 只要她快樂; 8. 愛的手榴彈; 9. 愛沒走; 10. 哎呀; 11. 透明愛; 12. Knockin'	Knockin' was written and produced by Bruno Mars 有你在 was featured in TV Drama "Material Queen" Is This All was written and composed by Ryan Tedder, and was also the theme song from TV Drama "Material Queen".
7th	Different Man: Released June 7, 2013; Language: Mandarin; Label: Universal Music Taiwan; Format: Studio album (CD); Genre: Mandopop	1. V.A.N.N.E.S.S (Intro); 2. 趁愛打劫; 3. 愛裡面 (feat.Enik Lin); 4. Different Man; 5. Love Overtime; 6. 讓我更愛我; 7. 真的明白; 8. 你怎麼知道; 9. 改裝 (feat.Flowsik); 10. LOV3; 11. 小婚禮; 12. V.A.N.N.E.S.S (Outro)	Love Overtime is a tribute to Michael Jackson and Prince
8th	#MWHYB: Released December 6, 2016; Language: Mandarin, English; Label: Universal Music Taiwan; Format: Studio album (CD); Genre: Mandopop	1. #MWHYB: The Beginning; 2. BOOGIE; 3. IKYK (feat. 孟佳 Meng Jia); 4. BASS GUN; 5. 屬於你和我之間的事; 6. 蹦蹦; 7. 玻璃屋; 8. 下一首情歌; 9. 愛是你愛是我; 10. Westside (feat. brandUN); 11. #MWHYB	
9th	Vanness Best: Released March 10, 2017; Language: Mandarin, English; Label: Sony Music Taiwan; Format: Studio album (CD); Genre: Mandopop	1. 尋找茱麗葉; 2. 我討厭我自己; 3. Hip Hop Tonight (feat. 吳建豪) (by Coco Lee); 4. 午夜場的電影; 5. 因為太愛你; 6. My Friend; 7. 我的王國; 8. Never Let You Go; 9. 幻想這愛; 10. 零時差; 11. Lucky Me; 12. Listen to Your Heart; 13. 媽媽; 14. 自己的節奏; 15. 誰讓妳流淚; 16. 妳不愛我愛誰; 17. Ask for More (by F4)	
10th	Take a Ride: Released July 22, 2022; Language: English; Label: Virgin Music Taiwan LAS S&D; Format: Studio album (CD) / Digital; Genre: Mandopop	1. Take a Ride; 2. Mad Love; 3. Meaningless; 4. Chill; 5. Miss Us; 6. Here With Me; 7. Media (weights); 8. Worship; 9. It's On; 10. Vibes	
11th	Dance Until We Die: Released December 31, 2025; Language: Mandarin, English; Label: B'in Music Taiwan; Format: Studio album/Digital; Genre: Mandopop	1. Dance Until We Die; 2. Ur The Reason (中文版); 3. 換場 (OT：I Dreamt You); 4. Peace by Piece; 5. 傑作 (OT：PFW); 6. Save Me; 7. Pray; 8. I Dreamt You; 9. Ur The Reason; 10. PFW	

=== Singles ===
Single#	Title	Track List
1st	Only: Released May 20, 2009; Language: Japanese; Label: Pony Canyon; Format: Single (CD); Genre: J-pop	1. ONLY; 2. Cinderella; 3. Hello Super Star; 4. ONLY (Instrumental); 5. Cinderella (Instrumental); 6. Hello Super Star (Instrumental)
2nd	I Don't Wanna Lose You: Released September 2, 2009; Language: Japanese; Label: Pony Canyon; Format: Single (CD); Genre: J-pop	1. I Don't Wanna Lose You; 2. KODOKU; 3. It's Your Girl; 4. I Don't Wanna Lose You (Instrumental); 5. KODOKU (Instrumental); 6. It's Your Girl (Instrumental)
3rd	Reason: Released January 20, 2010; Language: Japanese; Label: Pony Canyon; Format: Single (CD); Genre: J-pop	1. Reason; 2. Stuck on U 3. Devil; 4. Reason (Instrumental); 5. Stuck on U (Instrumental); 6. Devil (Instrumental)
4th	No More Tears: Released July 21, 2010; Language: Japanese; Label: Pony Canyon; Format: Single (CD); Genre: J-pop	1. No More Tears; 2. That Girl; 3. Supafly; 4. No More Tears (Instrumental); 5. That Girl (Instrumental); 6. Supafly (Instrumental)
5th	Soldier: Released September 21, 2010; Language: Japanese; Label: Pony Canyon; Format: Single (CD); Genre: J-pop	1. Soldier; 2. Shine on 3. Better; 4. Soldier (Instrumental); 5. Shine on (Instrumental); 6. Better (Instrumental)
6th	Endless Dance: Released March 7, 2012; Language: Japanese; Label: Pony Canyon; Format: Single (CD); Genre: J-pop	1. Endless Dance; 2. Every Moment; 3. Destiny; 4. Endless Dance (Instrumental); 5. Every Moment (Instrumental); 6. Destiny (Instrumental)
7th	Summertime Love - Single: Released August 31, 2018; Language: Mandarin; Label: Universal Music Taiwan; Format: Single (CD); Genre: Mandopop	1. Summertime Love

=== With Kangta and Vanness ===
- 2006 – Scandal – Kangta & Vanness Collaboration

=== Other collaborations ===
- Beyoncé – "Crazy in Love" (Asian releases only) [2004]
- Coco Lee – "Hip Hop Tonight" [2006]
- Brian Joo – "Everything to Me" [2010] – 3rd Wave Music – I WILL BE THERE Album – www.3rdwavemusic.org
- Sammi Cheng – "Forgiveness" (In both English and Chinese) [2010]
- Lee Junho – "Undefeated" [2012] (M/V)
- Avicii – "Levels" (Mandarin Version) [2013]
- David Foster, Anggun and Melanie C – "Let's Groove" (charity single for the victims of Nepal earthquake) [2015]
- B. Howard - "We Are Champions" [2020]
