= Barbie Hsu =

Taiwanese actress and singer (1976–2025)

- 徐熙媛
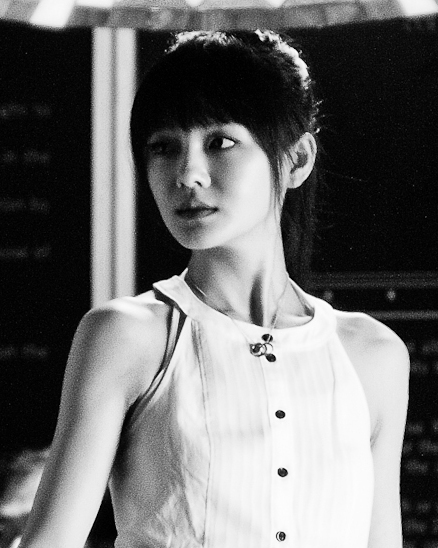
- Hsu in 2010
- Born: 6 October 1976; Taipei, Taiwan
- Died: 2 February 2025 (aged 48); Tokyo, Japan
- Resting place: Chin Pao San Cemetery, New Taipei City
- Other names: Hsi-yuan Hsu; Tiger Hsu; Shancai
- Education: Taipei Hwa Kang Arts School
- Occupations: Actress; singer; television host
- Years active: 1994–2025
- Agent(s): Famous Records (c. 1991–1997); Golden Star Entertainment (c. 1997–2010); Taiping Entertainment (2010–2025)
- Notable work: Meteor Garden
- Spouses: Wang Xiaofei (m. 2011; div. 2021); Koo Jun-yup (m. 2022)
- Children: 2
- Relatives: Dee Hsu (sister)
- Awards: Golden Lotus Award for Best Actress for Croczilla
- Musical career
- Genre: Mandopop
- Labels: Pony Canyon (1994–1997); Skyhigh Entertainment (2001–2002)
- Formerly of: A.S.O.S.

Shi-yuan Barbie Hsu (Chinese: 徐熙媛; pinyin: Xú Xīyuán; 6 October 1976 – 2 February 2025), also known by her stage name Big S (大S; Dà S), was a Taiwanese actress, singer, and television host. She debuted alongside her younger sister Dee Hsu (Little S) in 1994 as part of the musical duo S.O.S (Sisters of Shiu), which was later rebranded as A.S.O.S (Adult Sisters of Shiu) and transitioned into television hosting. The sisters co-hosted variety shows such as Guess (1996–2000) and 100% Entertainment (1998–2005) before Barbie shifted her focus to acting.

As an actress, Hsu rose to pan-Asian fame with her leading role in the television drama Meteor Garden (2001–2002), which is credited with ushering in the idol drama genre and the golden era of Taiwanese television. She went on to star in dramas such as Mars (2004), Corner with Love (2007), Summer's Desire (2010), as well as in the films Connected (2008) and Reign of Assassins (2010). After her first marriage in 2010, she gradually stepped back from her career.

Hsu ranked 33rd on the Forbes China Celebrity 100 in 2010, 16th in 2011, and 45th in 2012.

== Early life ==
Hsu was born on 6 October 1976 to Hsu Chien and "May" Huang Chun-mei in Taipei as the second child of three sisters. She had an elder sister, Hsu Shi-hsien, and a younger sister, Dee Hsu.

Hsu's paternal family owned a jeweler's shop in Taipei, founded by her paternal grandfather, a waishengren from Tancheng County, Shandong, for over 60 years until its closure in 2018. When she was young, her mother, a benshengren originally working as a waitress at the restaurant next to the Hsus' shop before marriage, separated from Hsu's father, the only son with seven sisters, due to pressure from his family to bear a son, along with his infidelity, domestic abuse, alcoholism and gambling. Her mother worked as a real estate broker to support Hsu and her two sisters while her father fled due to his gambling debt when she was 14, though he later returned. Her parents formally divorced in late 2008 as part of an agreement in which Barbie and Dee settled their father's gambling debts one final time—reportedly after he was held hostage by debt-collecting triad members along with his girlfriend—in exchange for his signature on the divorce papers. Over the years, they had already paid more than NT$8 million to cover his debts. Their mother acted as a spokesperson and partial manager throughout their career, while their father, who maintained a good relationship with his daughters after he had given up drinking, died from liver cancer in 2012 at the age of 59.

In 1993, Hsu enrolled at the National Kuo Kuang Academy of Arts, then under Taiwan's Ministry of National Defense, and dropped out after one year due to its military-style discipline. In 1994, she and Dee enrolled at the Taipei Hwa Kang Arts School, a vocational senior high school where she majored in the Drama Department and specialized in Chinese opera kungfu, namely the martial arts and acrobatic techniques used in traditional Chinese opera. At Hwa Kang, the sisters befriended classmates Pace Wu, Aya Liu, and three others, forming a close-knit group known as the "Seven Fairies", named after the characters of Chinese folklore. After four of them entered the entertainment industry, they grew close to three fellow artists—Christine Fan, Mavis Fan, and Makiyo Kawashima—who were later also widely associated with the name "Seven Fairies".

== Career ==
At age 11, Hsu made her first film appearance as an extra in The Sea Plan (1987), directed by Heinrich Wang. At 14, after her sister Dee was scouted while running on the school playground and invited along with their family to audition for a commercial directed by Wayne Peng and featuring singer Chou Chuan-huing, the three Hsu sisters and their mother attended the tryout together. Barbie then began working as a commercial actress, initially and primarily under Peng's direction, to help support the family financially. Her work included a beverage commercial with Takeshi Kaneshiro at age 17, which would also be shown in the film The Ring (2002), prior to her enrollment at Taipei Hwa Kang Arts School.

During the commercial audition, the Hsu sisters caught the attention of Chou's label, Famous Records (神采唱片), which first signed Barbie, followed shortly by Dee. Barbie was featured on the variety show Comedian Bump Earth (笑星撞地球) with Chou as his "fan," while the sisters appeared in the music video for Chou's song "Can't Let You Go" (捨不得你走) in 1991. However, before their debut as a pop duo, contractual disputes arose due to a clash between the sisters' playful personalities and Famous Records founder Chen Kuo-Chin's vision of a more "pure and innocent" image for them, modeled after then-popular singers such as Amber Fang, Gloria Yip, and Vivian Chow. As a result, their first album, Occupy Youth (佔領年輕), was shelved for two years. When it was released in 1994, Chen initially named the duo Do Bi Do Wa (嘟比嘟哇) after one of their songs. However, during their first recording of a variety show, the host mistakenly assumed that one sister was named Do Bi and the other Do Wa. Disliking the name, one day before the agency's formal announcement of the duo's stage name, Hsu sought help from their album's producer, Bing Wang, who subsequently renamed them S.O.S. (Sisters of Shiu), which also led to their respective stage names, Big S and Little S.

Upon their debut, the duo was well received by Taiwanese variety shows during their promotional tour, despite their agency's strong objections to their adoption of a comedic image, which clashed with their intended branding. They gained popularity in 1995 with their bubblegum pop song "Ten-Minute Love" (十分鐘的戀愛) from their second album Best of S.O.S., but their following albums received little notice. In 1995, they attempted to break into the Japanese market with the release of two albums: Occupy Youth, their Taiwanese debut album, was released in Japan on 19 August, followed by a best-of compilation on 16 December, which featured Japanese versions of songs from their first three Taiwanese albums and four additional Japanese tracks. They also appeared on Fuji TV's late-night variety show Asia N Beat (アジアNビート). Their venture into Japan was cut short primarily due to Dee's unwillingness to maintain a long-distance relationship with her then-boyfriend Mickey Huang in Taiwan, leading the sisters to step back from their training sessions in Japan and ultimately part ways with then-manager Chen Kuo-Chin. That same year, the duo first dabbled in hosting with two short-lived variety shows, Chao Meng XYZ (超猛XYZ) and Qingchun Baomazai (青春報馬仔).

In 1996, with no sign of a career revival, the sisters considered leaving the entertainment industry by opening a clothing store, which would become Shi Mu at Dinghao Mall in Eastern District of Taipei, operated by their older sister from mid-1997 until its closure in early 2004 due to financial losses. The duo also attempted other side ventures in the early 2000s—including another clothing store with Pace Wu and an investment in a dessert shop—both of which failed by 2004. By the time of their store Shi Mu opened, however, their performance at a mixed-artist concert on the Mid-Autumn Festival in 1996—organized by TV producer and manager Wang Wei-Zhong, known as Taiwan's "Godfather of Variety Shows"—had impressed him not for their vocal prowess but for their energetic stage presence and ability to draw a crowd despite the rainy night, prompting Wang to offer them television hosting opportunities.

After becoming the first generation of Guess hosts and then terminating their contract with Chen, whose agency banned them from releasing albums under their original group name, they rebranded as A.S.O.S. (Adult Sisters of Shiu) and signed with Wang's Golden Star Entertainment. Following this, the duo shifted their career focus from singing to hosting. They co-hosted Golden Star-produced variety show Guess (1996–2000) with Lung Shao-hua and then Jacky Wu, respectively; entertainment news program 100% Entertainment (1998–2005); variety show Weekend Three Precious Fun (週末三寶Fun) (2001) with Harlem Yu; and cooking show Gourmet Secrets of the Stars (2007–2008). The duo ended their management partnership with Wang Wei-Zhong and established their own studios in 2010, after which Barbie primarily focused on acting in Hong Kong and mainland China, while Dee continued hosting in Taiwan.

As hosts, the duo became known for their casual, intimate, and authentic style, underpinned by a sharp sense of humor, with Barbie often playing the straight man while Dee played the comic. After their initial success on Guess, where they played second fiddle to male hosts, the sisters' second wind came with entertainment news program 100% Entertainment. They impressed the producers while temporarily filling in for the show's original MC, Tu-lin Ho, and were subsequently offered the hosting role by GTV founder Yang Teng-kuei, a figure with reputed triad connections who would later become their godfather. During their tenure, news segments on the show frequently gave way to the sisters’ lively and sassy banter. They were known for candidly (and sometimes excessively) sharing personal anecdotes and family matters, blurring the lines between their private and public lives and pioneering a form of reality television avant la lettre in the Chinese-speaking world.

The media synergy the sisters thrived on was evident in a tumultuous 2000. Earlier that year, after two years under the high pressure of 100% Entertainment’s daily live broadcasts, they attempted again to withdraw from the entertainment industry. The decision was precipitated by a series of personal and professional setbacks, including the death of their grandfather in late 1999, backlash over their comments on glove puppetry, and their public criticism of Guess co-host Jacky Wu for concealing his marriage while entangled in a love triangle with actress Vicky Chen and TV producer Chan Jen-hsiung. Seeking to resign from hosting, the sisters told their manager, Wang Wei-Zhong, that they planned to leave the industry by going to study in England. Wang ultimately persuaded them to stay, compromising with a one-month study trip instead. In September 2000, the sisters traveled to England with Mavis Fan and filmed travelogue segments for 100% Entertainment. The sisters' wavering commitment to their careers came to a head during the study trip in October, when Dee in London received a breakup call from her then-boyfriend Mickey Huang from Taiwan. Upon returning to Taiwan, the sisters used their platform to allege that the breakup was caused by Huang's affair with Bowie Tsang. The allegation, which would be substantiated a year later by the founding issue of the Next Magazine (Taiwan), severely damaged both Huang's and Tsang's careers. Other notable examples throughout the years of their non-scripted, melodramatic reality television style on 100% Entertainment included Barbie's disappearance from a planned live broadcast following a family dispute—prompting Dee to tearfully search for her on air—and the public unravelling of Barbie's breakups with Koo Jun-yup and Lan Cheng-lung. In 2019, GTV began re-airing edited episodes of 100% Entertainment from the sisters’ tenure, which gained renewed popularity among younger audiences on social media.

Musically, after leaving Famous Records in 1997, they mainly focused on hosting and did not release an album for four years, until Pervert Girls (變態少女) in 2001, their first album as A.S.O.S. but also their last as a group. They signed a one-year record deal with a relatively small label Skyhigh Entertainment in exchange for the creative carte blanche over the album, where Barbie and Dee wrote all the compositions and lyrics. Initially produced by Sandee Chan before she was replaced by Mavis Fan, the album was a gothic fantasia that was overlooked upon release, but was later reassessed for its avant-garde experimentation and revived on social media. In 2010, Barbie, Dee, and Mavis Fan debuted Shorty Tall (小小大), with Barbie serving as artistic director and overseeing visual and costume design. The group, which had been in contemplation for years, performed only twice that year, at the Kangsi concerts in Beijing and Shenyang. Barbie, Dee, Mavis and Aya Liu, who sometimes called themselves the Four Sisters (四姐妹) and performed together, released two songs, "Girls' Party" (姐妹們的聚會) in 2001 and "Girls Journey" (姐妹們的旅行) in 2019, both celebrating their friendship. Outside of her group activities, Hsu sporadically released songs, such as the duet "Let Me Love You" (讓我愛你) with Vic Chou, the single "Diamond" (鑽石) with her own lyrics, and the duet "Sweetheart" (心肝寶貝) with Richie Jen. The three songs, respectively, served as the theme songs for the TV dramas Mars (2004), Summer's Desire (2010) and the film Adventure of the King (2010). She appeared in music videos, such as Shin's "Before the Dawn" (黎明之前), Show Lo's "Self-Hypnosis" (自我催眠) and "Waist Support" (撐腰), and Shawn Yue's "We are Actually Familiar" (其實我們很熟). She also wrote lyrics for other singers such as Mavis Fan, Josie Ho, and Dee. In 2015, Barbie and Dee reunited for their breakout song, "Ten-Minute Love," at the live house Legacy Taipei during Dee's first solo concert.

As an actor, Hsu rose to pan-Asian fame with her leading role of Shan Cai in Meteor Garden (2001), the first TV adaptation of the Japanese comic series Hana Yori Dango, along with boy group F4. Besides the Chinese-speaking world, the show brought her fame in large swathes of East and Southeast Asia, with many countries producing remakes in the following years, including Japan's Boys Over Flowers (2005), South Korea's Boys Over Flowers (2009), China's Meteor Shower (2009) and Meteor Garden (2018), United States's Boys Before Friends (2013), and India's Kaisi Yeh Yaariaan (2014–). The show earned her a nomination for Best Actress at the 36th Golden Bell Awards and is credited with ushering in the idol drama genre—teen-oriented love stories featuring attractive young stars—and the golden era of Taiwanese television, during which Taiwan dominated the genre in the Asian market for the next decade. Following a sequel Meteor Garden II (2002), Hsu established herself as the first "Queen of Idol Dramas," starring in TV dramas such as Eternity: A Chinese Ghost Story (2003), Mars (2004), where she reunited with F4 member Vic Chou, Corner with Love (2007), for which she was nominated for the Magnolia Award for Best Actress at the 14th Shanghai Television Festival, and Summer's Desire (2010).

Hsu transitioned into films later in her career but found less success compared to television. Her first starring role in a feature film came with the Chinese horror film The Ghost Inside (2005), followed by the Taiwanese films Silk (2006) and My So-Called Love (2008). Unaware of the film's explicitness, she unsuccessfully auditioned for the female lead in Ang Lee's Lust, Caution (2007), which eventually cast Tang Wei. Hsu broke into Hong Kong film industry with Connected (2008), a remake of the Hollywood thriller Cellular (2004), for which she received a nomination for the Best Actress at the 28th Hong Kong Film Awards. For her two films On His Majesty's Secret Service (2009) and Hot Summer Days (2010), she shared the Best Movie Actress at the 14th China Music Awards with Kelly Lin and Yan Ni. However, for her three films in one year, Future X-Cops (2010), Reign of Assassins (2010), and Adventure of the King (2010), Hsu received the Most Disappointing Actress at the 2nd Golden Broom Awards. The reasoning given was: "Hsu's acting is confusing, with her laughing resembling crying and crying resembling laughing. Her performance feels too modern, overly exaggerated, and lacks emotional depth."

After marrying Chinese entrepreneur Wang Xiaofei in late 2010, Hsu decided to step back from her career to focus on family life. Nevertheless, she accepted a role in My Kingdom (2011), a martial arts film she had initially withdrawn due to radial nerve inflammation that had immobilized her right hand and arm, before its director, Gao Xiaosong, a friend of Wang, successfully lobbied her through him to reconsider. The film, the last she acted in, underperformed at the box office, coinciding with the director’s drunk driving scandal; it premiered while he was in jail, the first public figure in China to be sentenced after the offense was criminalized that year.

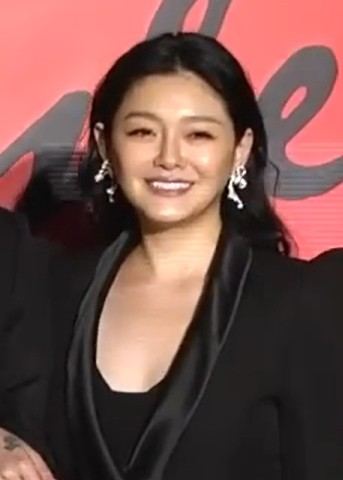
Hsu in 2018

In 2012, two films Hsu had shot in 2010 were released after two years of post-production. For her performance in the monster film Croczilla (2012), she received the Golden Lotus Award for Best Actress at the 4th Macau International Movie Festival, without prior knowledge of the nomination or an invitation to the ceremony, and the Best Actress at the 1st Asian Idol Awards, held by Anhui TV in 2012, a ceremony that was discontinued the following year after its second iteration. Her last theatrical release was the Hong Kong film Motorway (2012), where she received the leading female credit but only made a cameo appearance. Throughout her film career, Hsu faced skepticism regarding her credibility as a serious actress and her perceived lack of bankability as a movie star, but retrospective evaluations of her work improved after she withdrew from acting, recognizing her as one of the few actresses whose film career spanned Greater China, including Taiwan, Hong Kong, and mainland China.

In addition to acting, Hsu published a beauty guide Beauty Queen (美容大王) in 2004, followed by a sequel in 2007. Both books became bestsellers across the Chinese-speaking world and played a major role in popularizing brands such as Kiehl's and SK-II in China, though some of the beauty ideals and techniques they introduced were subject to re-evaluation in later years. Among the many beauty tips she popularized—both in her books and beyond—were the "red wine facial mask" and the use of the hair-loss treatment Rogaine to thicken eyebrows. She co-wrote SOS Chao Meng Qing Chun (SOS超猛青春; 1996) and SOS Tokyo Shopping Map (SOS東京拚裝大地圖; 1998) with Dee, the former about their teenage years and the latter a Japanese fashion and travel guide. She also published Penny Dreadful (蝴蝶飛了; 2005), a collection of poems, and Lao Niang Jia Dao (老娘駕到; 2015), a memoir about motherhood for her first child.

Hsu paused her career after the first year of her marriage. Following the birth of her first child in 2014, Hsu made several attempts at returning to acting, only to be thwarted by pregnancy, health issues, and the declining opportunities for middle-aged actresses. Notably, she withdrew from the TV series Ruyi's Royal Love in the Palace (2018) and a planned hosting reunion with Dee following the conclusion of the latter's talk show Kangsi Coming, both due to her pregnancy in 2015. In November 2016, she drew attention by posting a make-up-free selfie on Weibo, presenting it as evidence of her wish for acting opportunities and her readiness to portray ordinary, unglamorous roles. Her last attempt at acting was a role she volunteered for to support Angie Chai, the producer of Meteor Garden, when Chai's Taiwanese adaptation of the K-drama Our Blues (2022) reportedly fell through in 2024.

Hsu continued to appear in variety shows and advertisements. From 2011 to 2012, and for a short period in 2015, she served as a stand-in host for Dee during the latter's maternity leave and injury leave, respectively, on Kangsi Coming, where Barbie also frequently appeared as a guest over the years. After her second childbirth, she returned as a guest on the Chinese game show The Brian (Season 4) in 2017. Since 2017, Hsu had collaborated with the Italian brand C&C Gioielli to design and co-brand a jewelry line. In 2018, she participated in her final film, reprising her role of Elastigirl as a voice actress in Taiwan's dubbed version of the Pixar animated film Incredibles 2. That same year, she hosted Chinese variety show Miss Beauty (Season 1) (Beauty小姐) and participated in the marriage reality show Happiness Trio (Season 1) (幸福三重奏) with her then husband Wang Xiaofei. In 2019, she participated as a commentator in both the Chinese reality dating series Dream Space (Season 2) (戀夢空間) and the family reality series We've Grown Up (我們長大了), which follows the upbringing of a family's second child after the loosening of China's one-child policy. That same year, she participated in the travelogue series We Are Real Friends (我們是真正的朋友) with Dee, Mavis Fan and Aya Liu. In 2020, she participated in the Chinese documentary show After Becoming Mother (Season 2) (成為媽媽後). She co-produced the web show Dee's Talk (2021–2022) hosted by Dee, which was nominated for the Golden Bell Award for Best Variety Show.

== Personal life ==
=== Relationships ===
Hsu was a fixture in celebrity media, known for her high-profile relationships with male idols and two "flash marriages", which kept her in the public spotlight even after she had stepped back from acting. Her personal life has often been regarded as overshadowing her professional career, described as "daring in love and hate" and compared to the melodramatic plots of her own idol dramas.

Hsu's first love began in 1994 with a fellow student who was two years ahead of her at the Taipei Hwa Kang Arts School and lasted for three years until her graduation in 1997. She then dated Blackie Chen, after which they remained close friends. From late 1998 to 2000, she dated South Korean singer and Clon member Koo Jun-yup at the height of Clon's popularity. A fan of Koo, she was introduced to him by Taiwanese singer Yuki Hsu (sometimes misreported as Tarcy Su), who had covered the Mandarin version of Koo's song "Escape from City", at a party in Korea. They did not publicly confirm their relationship, during which Hsu faced pressure from Koo's fans due to circulating rumors, while Koo faced pressure from his management, who were concerned that a public romance could damage his idol career. In May 2000, Clon canceled a scheduled appearance on ASOS's television show 100% Entertainment at short notice to avoid fueling the romantic rumors. Dee subsequently criticized Koo and his management on air for their handling of the situation. Although it has been widely misreported that the breakup resulted from a dating ban enforced by Koo's management, Koo later stated that he personally ended the relationship out of concern for his career.

From mid-2001 to May 2005, Hsu dated actor "Blue" Lan Cheng-lung, whom she pursued after meeting on the set of Meteor Garden. Two months after their breakup, she began dating actor and F4 member Vic Chou, when Chou was involved in a car accident in July 2005, which prompted both to acknowledge their feelings for each other. Lan later implied the development was a betrayal by a friend, while Chou responded that he had never been Lan's friend. In January 2008, Hsu announced her breakup with Chou, which he later attributed to the pressure stemming from his less successful career and earnings, an explanation Hsu denied. In 2009, following her second collaboration with Hong Kong actor Louis Koo, reports surfaced about a secret relationship between the two, which both parties denied. However, the following year, she admitted to an on-set infatuation during an interview with Kangsi Coming.

In late 2010, while filming Croczilla, Hsu suffered from radial nerve inflammation and was introduced to an acupuncturist in Beijing by actress Ady An, who is also goddaughter of South Beauty restaurant group founder Zhang Lan. An, alongside their mutual friend Shone An, subsequently invited Hsu to two parties at LAN Club, the high-end restaurant of South Beauty. Hsu met the club's owner Wang Xiaofei, son of Zhang Lan, on both occasions. After their second meeting on An's birthday party at the club, Hsu invited Wang to her own birthday party in Taipei. After meeting a total of four times, Wang confessed his love by proposing to Hsu in Beijing, as he explained in his autobiography, Born in 1981 (2019):

There is an old American movie called Waterloo Bridge that many have seen. The male and female protagonists decide to get married the third time they meet because the man is about to go to the front lines, and both of them want to establish a relationship as soon as possible to avoid losing each other in the future. However, due to various unfortunate circumstances, they ultimately do not get married. It's a tragedy. Mentioning this movie is not to say that my relationship with her is the same, but when it comes to proposing on the fifth meeting, I really understand the male protagonist's feelings. My wife and I were living far apart—one in Beijing, the other in Taipei—separated by thousands of miles. I couldn't help but feel that if I didn't seize the moment and hold onto her then, I might miss out on being with her forever.

After an expeditious engagement ceremony, where they bought Tiffany engagement rings at Wangfujing and sharing mutton hotpot with friends at Houhai, they announced their engagement on 29 October 2010. The whirlwind romance drew wide media attention at the height of Hsu's career and Wang's family business. Wang, before he gained significantly wider recognition through Hsu, had been known as one of the Four Beijing Playboys (京城四少)—the city's most eligible fuerdai bachelors then, alongside Wang Yu, Wang Shuo, and Wang Ke—for his romantic associations with actresses such as Zhang Ziyi, whom he denied having an alleged affair with during her engagement to Aviv "Vivi" Nevo; with Ady An, who introduced Hsu to Wang but later experienced a strain in her friendship with Hsu amid widespread rumors of her romantic feelings for Wang, until Hsu and Wang attended her wedding in 2017; and with Zhang Yuqi, who announced her breakup "some time ago" with Wang one day before his engagement to Hsu was made public. Hsu and Wang registered their marriage on 16 November 2010, in Beijing. Their wedding rings were designed by Wang with the help of jewelry designer Wan Baobao, granddaughter of Wan Li and goddaughter of Zhang Lan.

Although Hsu preferred to treat the engagement ceremony as their wedding, a formal banquet was held at the request of Wang's family. Hsu's wedding ceremony took place on 22 March 2011 in Sanya, Hainan, and was followed by a private, week-long honeymoon in Bhutan. The star-studded beach event drew scrutiny for its perceived extravagance, including two five-star hotels booked for guests and a chartered flight from Taiwan. The generally negative publicity was compounded by her decision to keep the highly anticipated event private from the press corps stationed outside the venue—a move she only disclosed in 2024 was due to a miscarriage surgery four days before the wedding, when she publicly denied the media speculation about her pre-wedding pregnancy. Hsu's mother later claimed that Hsu had intended to cancel the wedding due to the miscarriage. However, Wang's mother, Zhang Lan, seeking to build momentum for South Beauty's planned IPO under a bet-on agreement, insisted that the ceremony proceed to avoid the Wang family "losing face". Although both families had announced they would not accept monetary gifts, according to Hsu's mother, Zhang collected them secretly.

Hsu's "flash marriage" left a surprisingly long-lasting legacy in the Chinese media landscape. In November 2010, the intense discussions of her marriage in the Kangsi Coming Group on Douban led to a splinter group, the Gossip Coming Group, specifically centered on the event. Over time, the latter grew into one of the most active and unruly spaces on the Chinese internet until it was banned by authorities in 2022. (The group was quietly reinstated in July 2025 under a shadowban, rendering it undiscoverable via public search and accessible only to existing members.) Zhang Lan, Wang's mother, claimed that the wedding was sponsored by Wanda Group, prompting Wang Sicong, son of Wanda founder Wang Jianlin, to publicly refute her claims and rise to prominence as a media personality over the following decade, during which he often mocked Hsu and Wang, until he was banned on Weibo for his criticism of the Chinese government's COVID policy. Charles Zhang, CEO of Sohu and a guest at the wedding, live-blogged the private event on Sohu Weibo, without the couple's permission but with Wang's mother's approval, in an effort to drive traffic amid the microblogging turf war, sparking a feud with the couple that lasted until Zhang reconciled with Wang in 2015. Zhang's unauthorized live postings—for which he refused to apologize after Hsu's demand letter—strained her relationship with the Taiwanese media, who viewed the exclusive content given to a mainland Chinese platform as an act of preferential treatment. The tension persisted until about half a year later, when Taiwanese reporters received a Mid-Autumn Festival gift from Hsu's mother—a Parker pen, accompanied by a note. The gesture symbolized a wish to "draw a line under the past," a reference to the Chinese idiom 一筆勾銷 (yī bǐ gōu xiāo), literally meaning "to write off in one stroke." After Zhang Lan's Douyin account was banned in 2025 following Hsu's death for spreading misinformation about her, Charles invited her to Sohu's livestreaming platform in a new round of the livestreaming turf war.

Following her marriage, Hsu continued working for a year before scaling back during three difficult years of trying to conceive, when she frequently sought treatment from a range of specialists in both Western and traditional Chinese medicine, in Asia and beyond. In 2012, Hsu ended her more than a decade of vegetarianism—which she had initially adopted in hopes that one of her pet dogs would recover from an illness, and maintained out of a desire to avoid harming animals—partly due to pressure from Wang's mother, who believed that vegetarianism was detrimental to fertility, despite the fact that Hsu's elder sister was also a vegetarian and a mother. Hsu also gave up her long-standing restrictive dieting and began taking herbal remedies and nutritional supplements, in addition to receiving high-dose ovulation hormone injections. These changes affected both her hormone levels and body shape, which never returned to its famously slender pre-marriage form, drawing public scrutiny from the media and private pressure from Wang.

Hsu resided in Beijing with Wang for a year but struggled to adapt to the climate, experiencing frequent nosebleeds, chest pain, and allergic reactions to the city's springtime willow catkins. She returned to Taipei, initially to serve as a stand-in host on Kangsi Coming during Dee's maternity leave until mid-2012, but moved back permanently from Beijing around early 2013. For most of their marriage, Wang commuted between Beijing and Taipei every week, with Hsu's refusal to relocate to Beijing being a major point of contention between them. They had two children: a daughter, Wang Hsi-yue (汪希玥), born in April 2014, and a son, Wang Hsi-lin (汪希箖), born in May 2016. Both were born and raised in Taipei.

Since the beginning of their relationship, Hsu had been characterized as a "gold digger" who married into wealth, a "public trial" she protested by asserting that she had been unaware of Wang's wealth before their whirlwind romance and by quitting Weibo alongside him on 10 November 2011, for several months. In 2013, Wang launched his first major venture beyond South Beauty, a health beverage brand that heavily relied on Hsu's endorsement but failed shortly after its launch. Since CVC Capital Partners’ buyout of South Beauty in late 2013 and the private equity's subsequent allegations of fraud and false accounting within the group—claims that led to the Wang family's ousting from the restaurant business in 2015—Wang increasingly leveraged Hsu's fame for his ventures, registering multiple trademarks related to her during their marriage.

In 2017, Wang opened the S Hotel in Taipei, named after "Big S," featuring Hsu's likeness, themed décor, and welcome messages styled in her tone, with a budget of NT$350 million. The hotel, the first wholly Chinese-funded in Taiwan, struggled following China's ban on individual tourism to Taiwan, imposed after political tensions flared from a pro-independence speech at the 55th Golden Horse Awards. The business was further impacted by the COVID-19 pandemic, becoming the primary financial burden on Hsu during her later years when she largely withdrew from working due to health issues.

On 20 April 2018, Hsu underwent surgery following her second miscarriage, just one day after the pre-show interview and a week before the main filming of the first season of the marriage reality show Happiness Trio, which she joined with Wang in an effort interpreted to raise fund for his business. Wang's mother, however, later accused Hsu of keeping the entire RMB 26 million payment for the reality show, while Wang was left to pay the associated taxes.

In 2020, Hsu sold one of her three properties in Taipei—an apartment at Kingdom of Global View paid for by Wang but registered under her name—in a move widely interpreted as another effort to support her husband, either to aid his struggling hotel business or to help fulfill his mother's guarantee, which accounted for 40% of her frozen assets in Hong Kong and was required to suspend enforcement. Wang's mother claimed that the NT$276 million proceeds from the sale went to Hsu's mother, while Hsu's mother asserted that the funds were primarily used for the payment on the couple's second and last residence, a penthouse at Taipei Shin-yi complex on Songyong Road in Xinyi District, which was also registered under Hsu's name. However, the claim by Hsu's mother is contradicted by the timeline—as the Taipei Shin-yi was acquired in 2016, while the Kingdom of Global View was listed for sale in 2019 and sold in 2020 after a price reduction—and by Wang's notarized documentation indicating that he had paid NT$150 million for the down payment for the NT$360 million Taipei Shin-yi property. Hsu's mother also claimed that the remaining NT$80 million from the sale of their first house had been deposited into a joint account to service the mortgage for the second house, but that Wang appropriated the funds without notification. Hsu later placed a second mortgage on the Taipei Shin-yi property to raise funds for the S Hotel.

After their divorce, Hsu's mother, who served as guarantor for the hotel lease on Wang's behalf due to his lack of Taiwanese citizenship, complained about Wang's reluctance to release her from the role, which left her receiving formal notices and facing potential legal liability as rental payments were delayed. In November 2023, the S Hotel joined the Accor group and was renamed as Mgallery, apparently after Mandy Ma, a Taiwanese medical aesthetics consultant whom Wang had dated for a month after being introduced by plastic surgeon Lee Jin-liang, the ex-husband of Hu Yingzhen, at the hotel. However, in August the following year, the hotel closed due to financial losses.

Hsu's marriage to Wang was beset by rumors of Wang's infidelity and accounts of his volatile temper from the outset. On 27 June 2010, Wang's first birthday after their marriage, he had an outburst during the birthday party organized by the Hsu family for him in Taipei, reportedly because the restaurant had been a place Hsu frequented with her ex-boyfriend, Vic Chou. In June 2011, Chinese model Elin Lü claimed she was in a relationship with Wang at the time he announced his engagement to Hsu. In March 2015, following a Hong Kong court order obtained by CVC freezing the personal assets of Zhang Lan, Wang Sicong, who had risen to fame after Hsu and Wang's marriage, mocked the couple and suggested that Hsu had been subjected to domestic abuse, which Hsu dismissed, saying she did not know him at all. By the late 2010s, their marriage was increasingly strained by Wang's struggling business ventures in Taiwan—which prompted his desire to relocate the family to Beijing, much to Hsu's reluctance—as well as by his outspoken nationalism regarding China's unification with Taiwan.

In July 2020, Wang left Taipei for a six-month business stay in Beijing, due to the travel quarantine requirements imposed during the COVID-19 pandemic, barring him from his regular cross-strait commuting. His first extended period apart from his wife and children, set against the backdrop of the pandemic, caused significant stress and marked the beginning of increasingly unmanageable mental health issues. During his time in Beijing, he was also photographed with a woman during a nighttime outing in Sanlitun, the city's bar and club district, but denied any inappropriate behavior implied by the paparazzi. Wang returned to Taipei for Chinese New Year, but during his quarantine in February 2021, Hsu requested a divorce, while Wang sought reconciliation. In March, they held a tenth anniversary wedding party in Taipei, attended by friends including David Tao, Ruby Lin, Wallace Huo, and Mavis Fan. Wang gifted Hsu a custom-designed 10-carat anniversary ring sponsored by a Chinese jewelry brand, before returning to mainland China, where he was first photographed with actress Zhang Yingying in May. Hsu would later accuse Zhang of having an affair with Wang before his divorce, while Wang's mother and Taiwanese paparazzo Ryan Ko claimed that Zhang also acted as an informant for Hsu and supplied Hsu with intimate photos of Wang with other women to support her divorce negotiations, a claim denied by Zhang.

In the early hours of 5 June 2021, Wang published two Weibo posts that became the final straw in his marriage. In the first post, he wrote: "This is what it looks like returning to the mainland for quarantine for the third time. Domestic consumption is thriving—we've already signed contracts to open 10 new stores. Meanwhile, my family in Taipei can't even get vaccinated. It's shameless, it's low-class. This is the contrast, this is the gap. Our company here is flourishing, while Taiwan is in decline. To my colleagues working at the hotel in Taipei: thank you for your hard work. If you can't continue there, we have dozens of stores in the mainland waiting for you as store managers, with double the salary," apparently blaming Taiwan's vaccination shortage on the DPP government, which at the time refused to import vaccines produced in mainland China and accused Beijing of sabotaging its efforts to procure vaccines from international manufacturers. In the second post, in response to the reports against the backdrop of China's zero-COVID policy that two passengers arriving in Xiamen from Taiwan had tested positive for COVID-19—one of whom had been allowed to board a Uni Air flight despite a positive test result—Wang harshly criticised Taiwan's rising anti-China and pro-independence sentiments while apparently referring to COVID-19-positive Taiwanese travelers as hanjian: "We've approached them with sincerity, only to be constantly used and slandered. After so many years, I've seen enough—it's unbearable. As a Beijinger, I can say this will be recorded in the history books: these hanjian," before editing out the slur term.

The morning after Wang's politically provocative posts, Hsu, living in Taipei, was reportedly distressed about the potential repercussions for her extended family in Taiwan, leading to a phone argument between the couple. She then replied to Taiwanese media that she was seeking a divorce from Wang, whose remarks she declined to comment on. Wang initially responded to Chinese media that he was unaware of any divorce, then deleted the controversial posts, explaining that he had spoken out of concern for his family inaccessible to COVID-19 vaccines in Taiwan. That evening, he posted again: "I love all my family—my wife comes first," in an apparent apology to Hsu. On the same day, Hsu's mother and agent dismissed her announcement as a moment of emotional outburst after a family argument. A week later, Hsu echoed Wang's criticism of Taiwan's pandemic policy, using even stronger language. However, after Wang's unsuccessful attempts to reconcile over the following months and Hsu's refusal to let him return to Taipei for her birthday, he agreed to enter divorce negotiations, prompted by Hsu's repeated assurances that she would not remarry. The couple formally announced their divorce on 22 November 2021. Hsu later revealed that she had offered custody of their children to Wang, but he declined, stating he would need three years for reasons she deliberately left undisclosed.

Days after the divorce announcement, on 28 November 2021, during a livestream, Wang's mother Zhang Lan accused Blackie Chen, a longtime friend of the Hsu family and Hsu's former boyfriend, of assaulting Wang over a political disagreement. The allegation, which implied Chen supported Taiwanese independence and sparked intense backlash against him from Chinese internet users, was retracted by both Zhang and Wang the same day and clarified by Hsu years later that Chen only "restrained" Wang from assaulting her. The incident nonetheless drew significant traffic to Zhang's livestream, marking the start of her controversial use of Hsu's name and celebrity effect to promote her livestreaming business—a source of cyberbullying cited by Hsu in subsequent years.

In December 2021, Wang was photographed multiple times with a woman alleged to be Zhang Yingying, his rumored affair partner leading to his divorce. On 25 December, he denied that the woman was Zhang, rejected accusations from Hsu's supporters that he had portrayed Hsu as a Taiwan independence advocate—citing his repeated defenses of the sisters on that issue—and distanced himself from his mother, stating: "The two of us parted peacefully and do not need any external harm. No one's voice can represent me or Barbie, including Ms. Zhang Lan." In the following months, photos circulated online showing Wang and Yingying on trips together, as well as Yingying and Wang's mother wearing matching necklaces. Wang's mother later claimed she had been misled by Wang into joining a trip to Mount Tai, where Yingying was among several young fans who requested photos with her and Wang. She alleged that Yingying later sent the photos to Hsu, whose lawyer cited them as evidence of Wang's infidelity and as part of a long-devised scheme to pressure him into agreeing to unfavorable divorce terms. Yingying denied this, stating that Wang had arranged the photo opportunity between her and his mother.

After her divorce, Hsu and Koo Jun-yup rekindled their relationship. According to Koo, after reading news of Hsu's divorce, he called a phone number he had kept for 20 years, only to discover that she had never changed it. However, Wang and his mother alleged that Hsu and Koo had remained in contact over the 15 years preceding her divorce, during which Koo had proposed to her. Notably, to prove Hsu's liaison with Koo had long been in place, Wang and his mother claimed that on 29 November 2021, a week after their divorce announcement, Hsu requested Wang to sign a supplemental agreement modifying their divorce settlement, which had originally required him to cover certain expenses such as housing maintenance and chauffeur fees only until she remarried, but now obligated him to continue paying afterward. On 14 January 2022, despite strong objections from his lawyer, Wang agreed to remove the remarriage clause based on Hsu's assurance that she would never remarry, less than a month before her remarriage. Additionally, Wang cited a home-use tattoo machine that Hsu purchased and sent to Koo in South Korea in August 2021—prior to the finalization of their divorce—using Wang's company account. However, Taiwanese tattoo artist Benjamin Lee, who had visited Hsu's home to give her a tattoo, clarified that Hsu had instructed her chauffeur to send the parcel merely as a courtesy after he mentioned that he was planning to send the machine to Koo, another of his clients. Taiwanese writer and television personality "Nick" Wang Yu-Ren and paparazzo Ryan Ko also claimed that Hsu and Koo had reconnected prior to her divorce. These claims were denied by both Hsu and Koo, with Hsu threatening to file a second defamation lawsuit against Ko after winning the first one over his drug use allegations.

Hsu and Koo registered their marriage in South Korea on 8 February 2022, so that Koo could enter Taiwan on a spousal visa amid pandemic-related travel restrictions. Although the registration took place three months after Hsu's divorce from Wang was finalized in Taiwan, it preceded the recognition of the divorce in mainland China on 18 February, prompting Wang's mother to allege bigamy. The couple registered their marriage in Taiwan on 28 March, following Koo's arrival and quarantine. The process attracted significant media attention, with news crews camping outside Koo's quarantine hotel and culminating in Taiwanese television stations live-broadcasting his emergence from quarantine to Hsu's residence. Their reunion scene, filmed by Hsu's agent, was later aired when Koo appeared on the South Korean variety show Golden Fishery in August 2023. Hsu did not inform her own family of the remarriage in advance, prompting strong opposition from her mother when the news became public on 8 March. However, after Hsu signed prenuptial agreements with Koo and transferred her residence at National Art Museum, a property purchased before her first marriage, to her mother, Koo was eventually well received by the Hsu family when he relocated to Taiwan. Hsu did not hold a wedding ceremony for her remarriage, except for releasing a wedding photo and matching wedding ring tattoos with Koo. Their marriage, two decades after their break-up, was widely celebrated in South Korea and Taiwan, where it was portrayed as a fairy-tale reunion.

On 30 March 2022, after Dee spoke favorably on her show about her sister's reunion with Koo, Wang, apparently offended by Dee's prior knowledge of either Barbie's remarriage or her alleged extramarital affair, harshly attacked Dee on Weibo and accused her of drug abuse. On 21 May 2022, Wang posted picnic photos taken at the same location as those shared by actress Zhang Yingying on social media. The internet quickly associated the two, long rumored to be in an affair before his divorce, prompting Wang to delete the photos. Days after, Taiwanese paparazzo Ryan Ko, who had been among the first to identify Zhang as his mistress in late 2021, drew wide attention when he claimed that Wang had engaged in affairs with over ten women and had purchased a luxury car for Zhang following her abortion of his child, a decision Zhang made herself after Wang did not commit to marriage but encouraged her to keep the baby. Wang's mother dismissed the photographic evidence Ko claimed to possess as fabricated and suggested that Wang's infidelity was in response to Hsu's alleged prior affair. Ko countered by publishing two intimate photos of Wang and Zhang taken in September 2021, marking the first time Wang's long-rumored affairs were substantiated, a decision, according to Ko, also driven by a longstanding grievance over Wang's alleged use of police power to conduct a three-day home search against Ko's fellow paparazzo for photographing him in China. Ko later expressed regret over releasing the images for triggering the prolonged post-divorce conflict between Wang and Hsu, who had initially parted on amicable terms. He also accused the Hsu family of taking advantage of him by remaining silent on his exposé.

On 30 May 2022, Wang acknowledged on Weibo the authenticity of Ko's photos, explaining that following Hsu's divorce request in February 2021, he experienced significant stress and developed alcohol problems, which led to inappropriate behavior while intoxicated. However, he denied having engaged in any extramarital affairs and filed defamation lawsuits against Ko twice in Taiwan. The first was withdrawn on the same day it was filed, while the second, initiated on 18 May, was dropped in August of the same year. Also on 30 May, in what appeared to be retaliation for Hsu's alleged "blackmail" over his extramarital affairs, Wang accused her of drug abuse by using prescriptions issued to others. He deleted the post shortly afterward and publicly apologized the next day, calling the drug allegation "the most regrettable thing in my life" but never disputed its truthfulness.

On 31 May 2022, Ko capitalized on his surge in gossip notoriety with a much-hyped livestream debut on Kuaishou—the main rival of Douyin, where Wang's family ran their successful yet controversial e-commerce business—during which Ko released additional intimate photos of Wang with three other women, a toned-down disclosure that Ko attributed to Wang's personal pleas with his mother's hospitalization. The livestream, during which Ko also shared salacious claims about JJ Lin and Mike Xu, Dee's husband, was abruptly cut off when he mentioned the rumored relationship between Dilraba Dilmurat and Lu Han, suggesting a protective intervention by Kuaishou amid China's crackdown on celebrity gossip under Operation Qinglang, launched in 2021 to rein in celebrity culture and fandom on the Chinese Internet. Ko later claimed that Hsu had thanked him through her agent, Angelina Liao, for releasing photos of Wang with other women, though the message was relayed via an intermediary journalist and denied by Liao. In December 2022, Ko filed a defamation lawsuit in Taiwan against Wang's mother, who had accused him of being a paid proxy for Hsu to expose Wang. In March 2023, Ko reconciled with Wang by livestreaming their meeting at Wang's hot pot restaurant, Ma Liu Ji, in Beijing. In August 2023, Ko's defamation case against Wang's mother was closed after Taiwanese prosecutors issued a non-prosecution decision.

In November 2022, Hsu sought enforcement of spousal maintenance of over NT$7.5 million at the Taipei District Court against Wang, claiming he had failed to honor their divorce agreement since March of that year. Wang claimed that he continued to pay child support and Hsu's personal maintenance but no longer wished to cover her family expenses—primarily the NT$40,000 monthly electricity bill for the house he had previously shared with Hsu, which she now shared with Koo—after Hsu remarried. He then launched a series of attacks against Hsu and her family on Weibo including her second husband Koo, her sister Dee, and Dee's husband, Mike Xu. Wang accused Dee of encouraging Barbie's divorce out of jealousy, implying that Dee wanted to sabotage her sister's marriage because Dee had endured habitual infidelity from Xu, who purchased a property in Shanghai for his extramarital relationships, using Wang's funds paid by Hsu after Xu had discovered Dee's affair with a dance instructor. A media frenzy erupted when Wang denigrated Koo for not replacing the mattress he had purchased for Hsu during their marriage; Hsu returned the mattress to the S Hotel, where it was destroyed live on Taiwanese television.

On 3 December 2022, prompted by Wang's mother's claim that Wang had paid for Hsu's two Taipei properties, echoing the long-standing narrative that Hsu had married into his wealth as a "gold-digger," Hsu stated on social media that she had personally paid for both homes, which had been chosen by Wang—whom she mockingly called "Aisin-Gioro Wang," a jab at his mother's claim that Wang was descended from the Manchu royal family. Hsu also showed an IOU signed by Wang in 2018, acknowledging a debt of over NT$170 million, which she had lent him to support his business. According to Taiwanese agent Eddie Chen, the IOU was written at the request of Hsu's mother, after Wang had repeatedly borrowed money from Hsu without timely repayment as his finances were controlled by his mother. Wang countered that Hsu had paid the down payment of Kingdom of Global View in 2011 using NT$200 million he had previously deposited into her account when he did not yet have a bank account in Taiwan. He also stated that Hsu had reneged on an agreement to offset the NT$100 million loan in exchange for her ownership of the nearly NT$400 million penthouse at Taipei Shin-yi following their divorce, and attributed the delay in repayment to China's strict foreign exchange and money transfer regulations, which he circumvented by selling a painting, through which he had repaid NT$5 million. Wang revealed the terms of their divorce and financial arrangements—widely seen as favoring Hsu, given his substantial financial commitments including a total of NT$184 million in alimony until 2038, a NT$250 million mortgage, and a credit card provided for routine expenses. According to Wang, Hsu had spent NT$12 million on luxury goods using his card post-divorce—including gifts for Koo and parts of the outfit she wore in her remarriage photos—after which Wang's mother claimed that she suspended the card in Hsu's possession. Hsu subsequently sued Wang for violating Taiwan's Personal Data Protection Act by disclosing her address and bank information.

Actress Zhang Yingying—whom Hsu identified as Wang's mistress, and whom both Wang's mother and paparazzo Ryan Ko claimed had acted as Hsu's informant during divorce proceedings—ended her relationship with Wang in January 2023, two months after he publicly acknowledged the relationship following years of rumors. Zhang cited ongoing disapproval and humiliation from Wang's mother as the primary reasons for the breakup, despite Wang's proposal. Following the split, Zhang frequently criticized Wang and his mother on social media, implying that Wang had "deceived" her—as well as other women—into romantic involvement with him. In August 2024, Zhang suggested that Wang had cheated on her with Mandy Ma. Ma responded on social media that she had not known Wang prior to October 2023, and referred to Zhang as a "mistress." Zhang subsequently noted that Ma's remark effectively confirmed Wang's infidelity to Hsu, after which Ma deleted the post. After Hsu's death, Zhang harshly attacked Wang on Weibo, claiming that Wang had been unfaithful since the second year of his marriage to Hsu, and "all the harm [Hsu] suffered was caused by him."

From 2022 to 2025, Hsu and Wang's post-divorce dispute—set in motion by tensions following Hsu's rapid remarriage and intensified by her legal efforts to enforce alimony—sparked wide-ranging public discussions on sexism, misinformation, and cross-strait relations. Both Wang and Hsu accused each other of infidelity and domestic abuse during their marriage. Wang and his mother accused Barbie and Dee of drug use, which the sisters denied, and criticized Hsu for not allowing the children to visit Beijing or meet Wang's mother, who hadn't seen her grandchildren in five years until she visited Taipei in December 2024. Wang and his mother accused the sisters of splittism and supporting Taiwanese independence, though Wang had previously defended them from such allegations, including Dee's Chinese nationalist trolling controversy in 2021. During their legal battle, Wang also repeatedly proposed remarriage in private, while publicly maintaining that he harbored no ill will toward Hsu or her family, attributing their post-divorce conflict to the actions of her lawyers and agent. His proposals were rejected by Hsu, who was then in her second marriage. In October 2023, during a livestreaming session, Wang's mother chided him for publicly expressing his wish to remarry Hsu, while Wang explained that he was motivated by concerns for Hsu's health and fears for her possible death. Hsu's agent, Angelina Liao, responded by urging Wang not to "both defame and profess love in an attempt to interfere with court proceedings." Wang subsequently filed a defamation lawsuit against Liao in Taiwan, but was dismissed by the court.

On 20 March 2024, Hsu issued her most direct and detailed response to Wang's series of allegations on Weibo:

The one who was unfaithful during the marriage was you, not me. After the divorce, it's true that I used your credit card a few times out of spite. But you had signed off on it yourself. More importantly, I never used your card to buy anything for my husband.

I was furious at the time because:

1. Zhang Lan fabricated claims that Blackie assaulted you over political differences. The truth is: you were drunk and physically shoved my sister. I, heavily pregnant, tried to stop you and was pushed to the ground myself. You then picked up a box set of deluxe edition Harry Potter and tried to hurl it at me. Blackie stepped in to restrain you and stop you from hurting me. He never hit you.
2. I discovered many indecent photos of you with different women during our marriage. I was devastated. That's when I understood why you were always so quick to fly back and forth...
3. Zhang Lan begged me not to divorce you. I had already told her about your affairs, and she swore to me that there was no such thing. The next day photos of Zhang Yingying and her together, wearing matching necklaces, appeared in the media. Even after being exposed, she kept denying she had known Zhang Yingying while insulting her constantly. Later, you publicly admitted to a long-standing relationship with her and called her your "savior."

Ten years of marriage, two deaths, and one serious injury. (Note: "Two deaths" refers to two miscarriages, and "one serious injury" to Hsu herself.) The fact that I used your card out of spite, looking back on it now, feels almost laughable. Because what I gave to you, invested in you, was far more than that. Even when I used your card, I was spending money I had worked hard to earn myself. After the divorce, you and your people spread rumors and twisted the truth, leading to the online abuse I still endure today. Still, I thank you—for creating such a brutal test for me. You've made me stronger. "No complaints, no excuses. With grace and composure—go!"

From now on, I will no longer respond to any of the slander and smear campaigns you fabricate. I will leave everything to the law and the judicial system. From this very second on, you are but an illusion, and I will walk only the path of flowers. (Note: "Path of flowers" is a reference to the song Flower Road by South Korean singer Kim Sejeong. It symbolizes a wish for a smooth and fortunate journey ahead, where only good things happen.)

On the same day, Wang countered on Weibo, along with a shipping receipt from Hsu to Koo as evidence for her liaison before divorce:

In response to Barbie Hsu's evasive statements, I'm going to lay everything out this time!!!

1. I never pushed your sister to the ground, and I certainly never pushed you. Your sister was always urging you to divorce me. I only pushed her once, in a moment of extreme anger—but I have never assaulted on either of you. You say I was violent toward you, but the truth is that when you were hallucinated, you attacked me with a knife, a golf club, and a wine bottle. There's evidence and witnesses. After you came to your senses, you said you didn't remember any of it and thought I was your father. And even then, I never once blamed you.
2. You said you never bought anything for that Korean man while we were married? Take a look at this shipping receipt—August 14, 2021! Heaven is watching. I chose not to expose this before, but now you've crossed the line. You had already reconnected with him—don't deny it.
3. After the divorce, you prepared your dowry by having me signed a supplemental divorce agreement that left me financially supporting both you and your new partner. I asked to see the kids, and you said I could take them abroad, but not back to Beijing! You even passed on your family's slanderous views about the Mainland to our children. I'm bringing all of this to light today. Don't talk to me about privacy rights—because you've clearly violated my right to protect my reputation!

All this time, I've put up with what your family has said. I kept telling those around me, "She's the mother of my children—I respect her." But you've never respected me. From now on, if you have something to say, say it yourself—don't hide behind others.

On 22 March 2024, which would have marked Wang and Hsu's wedding anniversary, Wang exhibited a series of emotionally charged outbursts. He conducted a midday livestream on Douyin, during which he showed affection toward his girlfriend, Mandy Ma, while also offering a backhanded compliment, saying, "I'll never argue with you—your personality doesn't allow for arguments anyway." He then tearfully sang Richie Jen's "Heart Too Soft," seemingly alluding to his perceived leniency toward Hsu during their legal disputes, before launching into a verbal attack on Zhang Yiming, the founder of ByteDance, Douyin's parent company, apparently triggered by the platform's automatic warning about his use of inappropriate language. The livestream was cut short when Wang's long-time housekeeper, Ms. Yang, intervened and took away his phone, as he appeared to be on the verge of an emotional breakdown. That afternoon, from his rented residence nearby, Wang went to his former marital home with Hsu at the Taipei Shin-yi complex to request a visit with their daughter. According to paparazzo Ryan Ko, the former couple had previously agreed that their daughter would stay with Wang during his stay in Taipei, while their son would remain with Hsu, with a chauffeur routinely dropping off the children after school. However, tensions had escalated following contentious online exchanges two days earlier. When the Hsu family—allegedly an unusually large group of six, including Hsu and Koo—picked up Hsu's son that afternoon, they also took her daughter from the vehicle. According to Wang's mother, Yang attempted to prevent this and was pushed to the ground by the Hsu family. Wang subsequently arrived at Hsu's residence with two companions around 5 p.m. Both parties contacted the police, who confirmed that Wang was emotional but neither intoxicated nor violent. Wang was allowed to see his daughter, and Hsu, without meeting with Wang, assured him through intermediaries that their daughter would return after dinner. He left without further incident. However, around 8 p.m., after Hsu informed him that their daughter would remain overnight, Wang attempted to forcibly enter her residence. Security staff contacted the police, who escorted him from the scene. At the police station, Wang told officers and media that his child was being "illegally detained" by Hsu and stated his intent to file a report accusing her, along with Dee, of abusing Stilnox through others' prescriptions. He ultimately left without providing evidence or filing a report.

Wang claimed to have experienced memory loss over the following four days due to severe psychological distress. His housekeeper Yang—who had already strained her relationship with Hsu as a live-in nanny by posting dancing videos on Douyin that revealed the interiors of Hsu's home—was dismissed by Hsu after having come to Taiwan with Wang nine years earlier. Yang returned to her home in Beijing until Hsu's death, after which she came back to Taiwan to resume working for Wang.

On 27 March 2024, when asked whether their highly publicized divorce—sometimes viewed as a symbolic end to the honeymoon period in cross-strait relations—would worsen relations, Chen Binhua, spokesperson for China's Taiwan Affairs Office and a personal friend of Wang's, responded at the office's regular press briefing, saying: "People on both sides of the strait are one family, and cross-strait marriages bring us even closer." However, regarding the "rare cases of failed marriages," the parties involved should "part on good terms and go their separate ways in peace." The next day, Wang successfully proposed to Mandy Ma.

Wang remarried in May 2024. In May 2025, by the time of Wang's make-up wedding banquet in Beijing, Taiwanese designer Robert Cheng, Ma's ex-husband from 2016 to 2022, publicly accused Ma of serial infidelity and of engaging in post-divorce legal harassment against him and his associates. Cheng's claims were supported by a non-prosecution ruling issued by the Taiwan Shilin District Prosecutors Office in response to a defamation lawsuit Ma had filed against one of Cheng's friends. In an apparent attempt to disrupt the wedding, over three thousand revealing photos of Ma, taken when she was 20, were circulated online, along with further allegations of extramarital affairs and an unverified claim that she had previously worked as an escort in Macau, a claim Ma has denied. Chinese celebrity wedding dress designer Lan Yu also implied that she declined Ma as a client out of support for Hsu, a claim Ma denied by stating she had never approached the designer. Wang's second wedding proceeded as planned on 17 May, without the presence of his two children with Hsu. Three days after his wedding, Wang posted on Douyin to Ma: "Thank you to my wife for loving Beijing, for getting used to the weather here, to my temper, to my friends, and to the Maotai here." The post was interpreted as an indirect jab at Hsu, who had struggled to adapt to Beijing's dry climate and was allergic to the city's springtime willow catkins, prompting her return to Taipei a year after their marriage.

In February 2023, Hsu filed lawsuits in China against Wang for defamation and invasion of privacy, and against Zhang for online infringement liability; Hsu later applied for injunctions against Wang and Zhang. On 19 August 2024, the Beijing Internet Court granted Hsu's injunctions by prohibiting Wang and Zhang from publishing Hsu's personal information online, but dismissed Hsu's appeal to shut down their social media accounts. The injunctions would remain in effect until the court renders a final judgment, but Wang and Zhang effectively ignored them by continuing posting about Hsu online.

At the time of Hsu's death on 2 February 2025, she had two ongoing sets of lawsuits, with three cases in Beijing and two in Taipei. Of her two cases against Wang in Taipei, one concerned matrimonial assets, which she had won in the first-instance trial but was appealed by Wang, the other concerned violations of the Personal Data Protection Act. Hsu claimed over NT$250 million from Wang, including his NT$170 million IOU, NT$80 million that he allegedly appropriated from their joint account funded by the sale of Kingdom of Global View, the mortgage she placed on her Taipei Shin-yi property to support his business, and spousal maintenance. In late February, 2025 Wang sent a message to Hsu's mother, offering to transfer the NT$7.5 million in spousal maintenance that Hsu had claimed before her death, only to find that he had been blocked. In March 2025, the Hsu family continued to pursue Hsu's matrimonial assets case posthumously, maintaining the NT$7.5 million claim against Wang. On 6 September, Hsu's mainland lawyer Deng Gaojing provided an update on three of Hsu's cases in Beijing. First, the defamation case against Zhang Lan and Douyin, pursued on behalf of Hsu's widower and her mother, remained under trial; Deng noted that an application for compulsory enforcement had been filed in May after Zhang allegedly ignored a court gag order. Second, in the private criminal prosecution against Zhang for defamation, Hsu's estate decided not to proceed further and authorized Deng to handle the termination of the case. Third, the online infringement dispute with Wang was not pursued.

=== Politics ===
Due to her waishengren, deep-Blue family background, marriages to a mainland Chinese and a South Korean, and her general outspokenness on public affairs, Hsu sometimes found herself caught between opposing political currents, particularly in her later years amid worsening cross-strait relations.

Hsu, along with her family, was a high-profile supporter of the Kuomintang (KMT), particularly of Ma Ying-jeou during the 2000s and early 2010s, though Hsu's political advocacy became subdued during her relationship with Lan Cheng-lung, whose family is affiliated with the pan-Green camp. In August 2013, however, Hsu expressed support for the protesters on Ketagalan Boulevard in front of the Presidential Office under the Ma administration following the death of Hung Chung-chiu, an army corporal who died from abuse in the military. In 2018, Hsu and her then husband Wang attended a private banquet hosted by pan-Blue business tycoon Terry Gou, which was also attended by Ma. After photos of the gathering surfaced online, Hsu explained that she had only been invited to a "family dinner" by her friend Delia Tseng, Gou's wife: "[W]hen we arrived we realized it was not simply a family dinner, as other friends had also been invited." In June 2021, Hsu posted on Instagram, "We are being massacred! Tsai! Massacring us," a statement interpreted as blaming Taiwan's COVID-19 vaccine shortage on the Tsai Ing-wen administration, which at the time refused to import vaccines produced in mainland China and accused Beijing of sabotaging its efforts to procure vaccines from international manufacturers.

Hsu occasionally commented on events in mainland China—a notable act for a Taiwanese celebrity, given the more limited freedom of speech and potential penalties for deviating from the party line. In 2011, she criticized the Chinese government's handling of the Wenzhou train collision in a Weibo post, writing: "One incident revealed so much: the selflessness of the rescuers, the greatness of the blood donors, the courage of the survivors. On the other hand—who disregarded human life? Who chased quick gains? Who shirked responsibility? The public is angry, heartbroken, and demanding answers. We seek the truth—and even more, we hope those in power will wake up." In November 2017, Wang disclosed on Weibo that Hsu had been deeply distressed by the child abuse and molestation allegations at a RYB Education kindergarten in Beijing, a scandal that was later heavily censored by Chinese authorities. He cited concerns over security as a factor in her reluctance to move their children to his native Beijing, despite his repeated requests.

Hsu's persistent advocacy for animal rights has at times put her at odds with the authorities and shifting public opinion. In 2013 and 2014, she spoke out in support of banning the Dog Meat Festival in Yulin, a cause that was then popular among Chinese internet users. However, in 2018, in a repost from PETA Asia on Weibo, Hsu drew attention with her language to urge the Hangzhou government to halt alleged public killings of stray dogs as part of a crackdown campaign: "All living beings are equal, and everything has a soul. To me, killing a dog is no different from killing a person. There are many peaceful ways to manage stray animals. I urge the authorities to act with compassion—good deeds bring good results." She faced backlash for allegedly spreading misinformation after the Hangzhou government clarified that the campaign targeted irresponsible dog owners rather than the animals themselves and denied accusations of abuse. Weibo, whose major shareholder Alibaba Group is headquartered in Hangzhou, later flagged her post with an official explanation—its first use of what would become its standard "rumor refutation" mechanism—deleted the original PETA post, and banned related hashtags about Hangzhou's dog-control campaign.

After the South China Sea arbitration ruling invalidated China's "nine-dash line" claims in 2016, the Chinese government increasingly sought to co-opt celebrities into promoting party-line messaging on social media, often exerting significant pressure on Taiwanese entertainers regarding issues such as cross-strait unification. Barbie and Dee were among the few Taiwanese celebrities known in mainland China yet refrained from participating in politically motivated repost campaigns on Weibo. In May 2020, Hsu's name appeared among 2,605 cultural and entertainment figures endorsing the Hong Kong national security law, but she clarified that she had not received any invitation or notification to participate in the joint statement and attributed the listing to a possible namesake. In August 2021, nevertheless, Barbie endorsed a Weibo statement by Dee clarifying that the latter did not support Taiwanese independence after Dee was involved in a Chinese nationalist trolling controversy. China's Taiwan Affairs Office later defended Dee during a press conference, a rare intervention that stood out amid frequent online "struggle sessions" targeting Taiwanese celebrities over perceived political deviations, such as Ouyang Nana and Christine Fan. Along with further support from Chinese state media, it was interpreted as Beijing's official acknowledgment of the Hsu family as key figures in united front outreach, owing to their longstanding deep-Blue, pro-unification stance.

Hsu's tumultuous marriage to Wang, one of the most high-profile cross-strait marriages, has at times been viewed as a barometer of cross-strait relations or a vehicle for competing political narratives from both sides. In 2011, following their wedding, Taiwan's pan-Blue, pro–Beijing Want Daily hailed their marriage as a milestone reshaping cross-strait marriage narratives, challenging stereotypes of economically disadvantaged mainland brides marrying into Taiwan, where discrimination against cross-strait marriages prevailed, and promoting greater equality amid China's economic rise. During their marriage, Wang became a frequent presence at cross-strait communication events and forums, often held with the official backing of the Chinese government. In 2021, following their divorce, China's nationalist tabloid Global Times commented that the couple's breakup reflected "the unscrupulousness of the DPP authorities," echoing Wang's criticism of Taiwan's economy and COVID-19 policies, while also noting a broader decline in cross-strait marriages, which is attributed to Taiwan's discrimination against mainland spouses and China's economic ascent. On the other hand, Wang's mother, and later Wang himself as their post-divorce conflict escalated, portrayed Hsu's reluctance to relocate to or visit Beijing with her children as indicative of pro–Taiwan independence sentiment. Due to the politicized scrutiny of their relationship, various commentators have described their breakup as a casualty of cross-strait tensions. Hsu's second marriage to Koo was less politicized than her first marriage. However, during Koo's first public interview after the marriage on the Korean television program You Quiz on the Block in 2022, he notably referred to Taiwan as "Taiwan, China."

Throughout her career, Hsu was considered a persona non grata among Taiwan's pro-independence pan-Green Coalition, which, in addition to her public support for the KMT, criticized her for allegedly showing insensitivity toward and stigmatizing local Taiwanese culture, thereby undermining Taiwan's self-identity; for marrying Beijing businessman Wang, an outspoken supporter of cross-strait unification; and for the couple's donation of face masks to Wuhan during the COVID-19 pandemic. After Hsu's death, some pan-Green-affiliated influencers expressed schadenfreude or circulated conspiracy theories about the circumstances surrounding it.

=== Hobbies ===
Hsu was known for her keen interest in beauty treatments, particularly in hair care, skin whitening, and weight loss. She earned the nickname "Beauty Queen" after her best-selling beauty guide series of the same name. Notably, she lightened her naturally darker complexion through a series of painstaking procedures, including skin-lightening injections and prolonged use of anticoagulants, despite being aware of the potential health risks. An avid shopaholic, she boasted a collection of over 700 pairs of high heels. During the high-pressure filming of Connected (2008), she spent nearly her entire salary on over 30 pairs of shoes in one day as a way to relieve stress. Hsu was a fan of sci-fi, the supernatural and the UFOs, as well as a member of Taiwan UFOlogy Society. Hsu was an early Taiwanese celebrity to embrace tattoos and piercings, which were stereotypically associated with the local gang culture. She had over ten tattoos, including a hexagram on the back of her neck as the symbol of Raëlism, matching ring tattoos with Koo, and matching lyric tattoos that read "Remember Together Forever" from the song "Remember" by French band Air—a line that Dee used to conclude her announcement of Barbie's death and Koo used as Barbie's epitaph. Hsu was a lifelong fan of Takuya Kimura since her junior high school years, which inspired her to learn Japanese and briefly pursue a career in Japan in 1995.

=== Charity ===
Hsu was an active supporter of charity over the years, particularly advocating for women's and children's rights, LGBT rights, and animal rights. Alongside Dee, she maintained a long-standing collaboration with World Vision Taiwan, through which the sisters adopted over 50 children worldwide, and with Lions Clubs International, where their mother has served as a leader in the Taiwan chapter since the 2010s. She was one of the first major celebrities to collaborate with People for the Ethical Treatment of Animals. Hsu also made anonymous or proxy donations, often in the names of her agent or mother, to various causes, some of which came to light after her death.

=== Health ===
Hsu was one of the first Taiwanese celebrities to publicly discuss mental health, including her battle with depression in 2000, from which she recovered after one year. She had a host of health issues, including mitral valve prolapse, epilepsy, asthma and a long history of anorexia. She experienced two miscarriages—one in 2011, four days before her wedding in Sanya, and another in 2018, during her fourth pregnancy, eight days before filming the marriage reality show Happiness Trio—and suffered a near-fatal complication during the birth of her son in 2016. She was hospitalized over the years due to fainting episodes. After her divorce, Hsu's ex-husband Wang Xiaofei—who had managed her health crises on multiple occasions during their marriage—and his mother claimed that Hsu was frequently bedridden and warned that her condition could be life-threatening. Her husband Koo Jun-yup also suggested that her fragile health had limited her mobility and her ability to care for herself. Hsu and her family, however, downplayed speculation about the severity of her condition.

== Final days and death ==
On 29 January 2025, during the Chinese New Year holiday, Hsu traveled with her family to Japan. She died in Tokyo on 2 February from influenza-related pneumonia, at the age of 48.

News of Hsu's death was first strongly hinted at by a Facebook fan page dedicated to travel and food in Japan on 2 February, assumably informed by the Hsu family's tour guide in Japan. After a day of intense public speculation, Dee, on behalf of the Hsu family, confirmed Barbie's death in a statement to media. The Facebook page that broke the news was taken down amid backlash over the premature disclosure.

Hsu contracted influenza in late January while still in Taiwan. Despite her condition, she proceeded with the planned trip, which was part of the Hsu family's annual Chinese New Year tradition. Upon arriving in Japan on 29 January, her symptoms worsened. That evening, she traveled to Hakone but remained confined to her room on 30 and 31 January. On the second night, she was transported to a hospital by ambulance but was not admitted for further treatment and was returned to her accommodation. On 1 February, as her condition continued to deteriorate, she was examined at a small clinic and subsequently referred to a larger hospital, where she was diagnosed with influenza A. However, she was only prescribed medication and sent back to rest. That day, she expressed a wish to return to Taiwan; however, in the early hours of 2 February, while en route to the airport, she suffered a cardiac arrest and was rushed to a hospital, where resuscitation efforts lasted 14 hours.

Hsu had a final phone call with Christine Fan before her respirator was removed. Present at her deathbed were her family—including her two children, husband, mother, sisters, their children (except Dee's eldest daughter, who was studying in the United States), and brothers-in-law—as well as her longtime friends Pace Wu, who has based partly in Japan since her partner Ji Xiaobo became a fugitive following a criminal conviction by a Beijing court, and Janet Chia, who was vacationing in Japan.

== Burial ==
No memorial was held by Hsu's family, in accordance with her preference to "keep a low profile." On February 8, the first seventh-day memorial (頭七) after Hsu's death, family and friends gathered at her home under the theme of her "third wedding anniversary," honoring her farewell wishes by sharing cake and champagne. Hsu was initially announced to have a tree burial in accordance with her wishes, but was later laid to rest at the Rose Garden of Chin Pao San Cemetery in New Taipei City, as her widower, Koo, sought to provide a memorial site for family and friends. The funeral took place on 15 March. On 2 February 2026, the first anniversary of Hsu’s death, a memorial sculpture designed by Koo with the help of Taiwanese artist Chendao Lee was unveiled at the cemetery.

== Image ==
As a group, Barbie and Dee have been famously dubbed "The Truman Show of Taiwan" by Kevin Tsai due to their extensive public exposure from a young age, through which they fostered strong parasocial bonds with audiences and a mutually dependent relationship with the media. In later years, as their family matters increasingly made headlines, the Hsu family was also, at times pejoratively, compared to the Kardashian family of the Chinese world (with Wang Xiaofei compared to "Kanye East"). Barbie and Dee are especially popular among women, urban dwellers and the LGBTQ community, of which they were also among the earliest public supporters in the Chinese-speaking world, including advocating for same-sex marriage on their show in the early 2000s. On the other hand, their shows sometimes sparked controversy with their no-holds-barred topics, sharp sense of humor, and alleged insensitivity toward Taiwan's local traditions and culture, including glove puppetry and Southern Min dialect, which are closely associated with the pan-Green Coalition, contrasting with their pan-Blue background. As Hsu explained one of her controversial jokes from 100% Entertainment on Kangsi Coming: "Little S told me that every time she saw me lying at home with depression, she was terrified that I might grab a knife and kill her. So I jokingly said, 'If I were to kill someone, I'd start with mom.' I was really just kidding, but because I happened to be struggling with depression at the time, everyone thought I actually wanted to kill my mom."

As a public figure, Hsu was often described as "brave," "kind," and "true to herself," drawing comparisons to the "chivalrous women," the heroines of kung fu films, stemming from stories such as her standing up to her father's domestic abuse to protect her mother during her childhood, and her intervening in a case of child abuse by a triad member after hearing a child crying as she passed their home. Hsu's friends and family often described her as being "ging," a Southern Min dialect word meaning "tense and unable to relax," reflecting her strict self-discipline and perfectionism on and off screen. "It's as if, from the moment Barbie Hsu burst out of the bedroom to stop her father, she stopped living for herself," noted Nothing But Storytelling magazine in a personality feature on Hsu, which was widely circulated following her death. In the same piece, Mavis Fan remarked, "She needs to love herself more, to embrace this adversary—only then will she begin to feel a bit better."

Hsu's leadership and loyalty to her inner circle were well-known, at times tested by significant pressure. In 2012, in the final days of Da Bing (Tony Fish)—her Hwa Kang classmate and friend, who died of pneumonia in Beijing following a series of drug scandals that derailed his career in Taiwan—Hsu financially supported his family through his younger brother, Xiao Bing, and helped his brother to bring his ashes home. In 2014, one month into her pregnancy—short of the three-month mark traditionally observed in Taiwan before announcing a pregnancy—Hsu revealed the news to the media as an effort to divert attention from the Top Pot Bakery scandal involving Dee's family. In 2015, after Makiyo Kawashima's career had been suspended following an assault scandal, compounded by financial strain as her mother was battling cancer, Barbie and Dee provided her with financial assistance. Hsu also maintained close friendships with Blackie Chen and Christine Fan after the couple lost a defamation lawsuit against Tina Chou, one of the celebrities who accused Chen of sexual harassment during Taiwan's #MeToo movement in 2023; with Pace Wu, whose partner Ji Xiaobo, son of Cui Lijie, became a fugitive after being criminally convicted and declared a "mafia kingpin" by a Beijing court in 2023; and with Janet Chia, who became a vocal supporter for Taiwanese independence, a political taboo in China, following the COVID-19 pandemic.

Hsu was popularly described as "daring in love and hate" for her romantic life. Her relationships, often with younger men, were shaped by her fame and strong personality, sometimes viewed as domineering or emasculating, a dynamic acknowledged by Vic Chou as a factor in their breakup and cited by Wang's mother as a reason for Hsu's divorce from Wang. Her entanglement with Wang, which kept her in the media spotlight after she had stepped back from her career, was variously framed as a romantic tragedy, a political parable, or a modern witch hunt—casting her as a sympathetic figure and feminist icon among urban and progressive women, a rhetorical vehicle for nationalists on both sides of the Taiwan Strait, and a target of criticism from segments of the manosphere and conservative housewives who viewed her as a "gold digger" or a deviation from traditional family values. Post-divorce, Hsu faced particularly harsh criticism on Douyin, popular among small-town and rural audiences in mainland China, where the Wang family maintained a successful yet controversial livestreaming presence until her death. By contrast, as argued by Jacky Wu and Holger Chen, Wang was portrayed more negatively in Taiwan, where the Hsu family was known for carefully cultivating media relationships through access journalism.

Epitomized by Zhang Lan's Douyin livestreams, Chinese social media platforms operated by various tech giants have drawn reflection for their role in enabling the misinformation campaign that plagued Hsu in her final years. Since around 22 March 2024, after Wang attempted to forcibly enter Hsu's Taipei residence, his name has intermittently disappeared from Weibo's trending list or been replaced with indirect references such as "Barbie Hsu's ex-husband" for unclear reasons. Notably, Weibo CEO Wang Gaofei, known for his pro–men's rights and anti-progressive views, publicly sided with Wang in 2022 during the divorce dispute, deriding Hsu's request for an IOU regarding RMB 26 million she had lent to her then-husband. According to the podcast Sis Highway, a discernible misinformation mechanism took root around Hsu with a pattern emerging on Weibo's trending list, where positive news about Wang included his full name, while negative reports referred to him as "Barbie Hsu's ex-husband," subtly casting him in a more favorable light while portraying Hsu as problematic. The podcast also challenged the popular belief that the Hsu family paid to trend on Weibo, noting their limited incentive to seek visibility on a mainland-focused platform after largely withdrawing from that market—arguing instead that they were used as content fodder for platform algorithms and opportunistic actors.

In her remembrance, Tencent Entertainment called Hsu a "cyber bestie of a generation," noting the "vibrant" and "entertaining" presence she and her sister brought to the Chinese-speaking world more than two decades ago remains unrivaled. Sanlian Lifeweek called her an "entertainment queen of her generation" while reflecting on the burdens of her relentless determination throughout her tumultuous childhood, career and marriage: "Though she never wished to reveal her struggles, never showed weakness, and never lost control in public, the experiences she endured over the years laid bare the challenges she faced as a woman [...] Beyond her iconic role as Shan Cai, her greatest performance was playing herself. If being a celebrity were a profession, she had fulfilled her duty with unwavering dedication—right up until her final moment." Southern People Weekly compared the significance of Shan Cai to Jane Eyre for Hsu's generation, drawing parallels between Hsu's life and her iconic character: "While they undoubtedly embodied pioneering attitudes and perspectives, they were also constantly restrained by traditional values," the obituary observed, identifying Hsu's marriage to Wang as a watershed moment, after which she put her career on hold as she navigated family drama and health struggles stemming from her pursuit of motherhood. "Yet, it is precisely because of her complexity, contradictions, and limitations that we love her—and love Shan Cai." Writer Huang Tongtong summarized Hsu's life as the "lifelong forced resilience of East Asian women," describing how she became the protector of her mother and sisters in "a deeply patriarchal family" and a survivor in the cutthroat entertainment industry, both from a young age: "She had no choice but to turn herself into a lone wolf—trusting no one but herself, relying on no one but herself. In many ways, her relentless drive, her desperate efforts, and her habit of living each day as if it were her last became an unshakable fixation in her life."

Writer Zuo Li referred to Hsu as the "daughter of television," a phrase that gained traction thereafter: "The tangled battle between Barbie Hsu and Wang Xiaofei represents the clash between television and short video. The daughter of television dies exhausted, while Wang's family of short video will eventually drain their source of traffic. Had this divorce occurred before 2010, the Hsu family might not have suffered as much—they were fluent in the grammar of television media, skilled at weaving together TV, newspapers, and magazines to craft narratives that minimized harm. But the era of short video and self-media has arrived. What was once seen as dignity in mainstream media is now dismissed as pretension, while bottomless attacks, rumors, and malicious speculation are celebrated as courage and authenticity. Barbie Hsu's death marks the end of the television variety era." Zuo Li also commented on Hsu's appeal to female audience, attributing it in part to the "Seven Fairies," a celebrity circle she led: "Barbie Hsu was a founder of female ecosystem, an effort that felt ahead of its time. What she gave birth to was not only two children, but also a tight-knit, women-focused community and a social network centered on female connection, flowing with a sense of yi similar to that found in male brotherhoods. This small universe had no kings or patriarchs, no oppression—only horizontal dynamics of friction, collision, support, and solidarity. Women fell in love with this ecosystem, and with Hsu herself: an actress of average skill and talent, seemingly gentle but full of character, and the day-to-day tapestry of female friendship she wove."

In Rappler and Rolling Stone Philippines, Hsu was remembered for the "Meteor Fever" that introduced the Philippines to Asian dramas, shifting the cultural landscape previously dominated by teleseryes and dramas from Latin America and North America. In Initium Media, critics Jia Xuanning and Yang Buhuan offered differing perspectives on Hsu's legacy. Jia noted that Hsu, with her sister, pushed the boundaries of traditional Chinese femininity, demonstrating that women could be "unruly, funny, and sharp-tongued" while freely expressing their emotions. Yang critiqued the dominant memorial narratives, arguing that they placed greater emphasis on Hsu's relationships and family over her professional achievements, romanticizing both her entanglements with Wang through tragic romance tropes and the circumstances of her death: "Drawing from Hsu's approach to life, her views on death, and her proactive and eventful romantic history, some articles have portrayed her death as that of a kung fu heroine—departing with no regrets, young, beautiful, and carefree, as if she had merely taken a fleeting journey through this world. However, this is a perspective I personally cannot accept. A woman of such deep emotions and passion endured over a decade of infidelity and domestic violence. After finally breaking free, she had only three short years to explore a new life—years in which she was relentlessly subjected to slander and humiliation from the outside world," referring to her acrimonious and polarizing divorce. Yang concluded: "If there is any solace to be found in her passing, I believe the most genuine comfort lies in what one netizen put so poignantly: 'Her final years of resistance and defiance won her the chance to return to her maternal, matrilineal family—to be cared for, and to pass with dignity.'"

In a commentary for CNA, Annabel Lim noted the collective sense of loss following Hsu's passing due to her strong parasocial presence, as if "a piece of my youth had been ripped away without warning." In The Straits Times, Jan Lee called Hsu "the TV big sister" growing up while reflecting on her beauty legacy: "She was also the first celebrity I remember who was honest about what she did to look good. As a self-proclaimed 'Queen of Beauty,' who released books about skincare and beauty treatments, she talked openly about Botox and Thermage and admitted to always being hungry to maintain her svelte figure. I don't think all her methods were healthy, but I liked that she did not sell me a fantasy." Zhang Ziyan, a popular independent entertainment writer better known by her pen name Luo Beibei, observed that while Hsu's beauty standards may be debated today, "[her] same ideas have ignited conversation in every era—that's what it means to be truly influential. Perspectives change over time, but one thing about Hsu never did: her extraordinary will and the determination to see things through. Whatever she set her mind to, she pursued with unwavering resolve—becoming beautiful, becoming a star, love and marriage, children, family, turning domestic life into captivating storytelling... And then, divorce. Followed by a remarriage so swift and unexpected after being applauded for her divorce that the world could barely process it, when she told the world that it was a love story two decades in the making." After Hsu's death, Zhang launched an online campaign calling for the ban of Zhang Lan's and Wang Xiaofei's Douyin accounts, which some credited as a contributing factor in the platform's decision to take action.

Kevin Tsai, a close friend to the Hsu sisters, compared Hsu's passing to an unfinished fairy tale, which echoes a widespread sentiment online: "Someone once worked so hard to pursue happiness, and after enjoying it for a while, that happiness came to an end. It's like flipping through a fairy tale, expecting to see the page where the princess and the prince live happily ever after, but that page was never printed—you just turn to a blank page. It's so shocking, like, 'This isn't what you promised me.'" Meng Jing, a senior entertainment writer, noted Hsu as the "backbone" of the "last matrilineal family": "The Hsu mother and daughters spent their lives both upholding tradition and, at times, resisting it when it threatened to crush them. [...] They were not the fearless, independent heroines of empowerment narratives—there was compliance, hesitation, and entanglement. They never delivered the dramatic slaps to their men that some might have found satisfying, leaving those observers frustrated by their lack of defiance, while others resented them for not fully submitting. But that is real life. The charm of the Hsu sisters lies in how every chapter of their lives resonates with so many people—because when a story is too triumphant, it leaves no room for you to see yourself in it."

== Controversies ==
=== Glove puppetry ===
In February 2000, Barbie and Dee sparked controversy on their show 100% Entertainment when they talked about Legend of the Sacred Stone (2000), Taiwan's first glove puppetry film. Barbie said: "Setting aside the serious topic of whether or not to support domestic films, I personally find glove puppetry unbearably awful... Sure, it may be considered part of China's cultural heritage, but at the end of the day, it's just puppets! You could just pick up a doll at home and perform the same thing... I honestly hate glove puppetry! The same goes for things like shadow puppetry and marionette shows—I hate them all." It was widely misreported that they called fans of glove puppetry "lunatics." They apologized after facing backlash from fans of glove puppetry, which is closely tied to Taiwan's local identity and pan-Green Coalition, in contrast to their own perceived association with the waishengren, pan-Blue Coalition.

=== Censorship ===
Throughout her career, several of Hsu's works have faced censorship or broadcast bans from authorities in both China and Taiwan. On 8 March 2002, shortly after a censored version of Meteor Garden began airing on multiple television stations in China, the National Radio and Television Administration suspended the series, citing its "significant negative impact on society" and the risk that it might "mislead young audiences." Despite the ban, the show maintained enormous popularity in China through pirated DVDs and internet circulation. In 2001, "Love You to Death" (愛你愛到死), a track from ASOS's album Pervert Girls (變態少女), was removed from the Chinese release of the album. In 2004, Mars, the Taiwanese television drama reuniting Hsu with Meteor Garden producer Angie Chai and F4 member Vic Chou, was banned in China due to its dark and explicit themes. In 2006, the Taiwanese horror film Silk, in which Hsu starred, was barred from theatrical release in China due to its supernatural content. In 2011, the music video for Shin's "Before the Dawn" (黎明之前), which featured Hsu, was banned from broadcast on Taiwanese television for graphic imagery.

=== Accusations of extravagance ===
After Hsu's relationship with Beijing entrepreneur Wang Xiaofei became public in 2010, at a time when Wang's family business South Beauty was at its peak, she faced significant negative publicity, being described as "extravagant," "ostentatious," and "gold-digging," and ridiculed as "Big $." On 30 October 2010, she wrote on Weibo: "If you fell in love with Clark, and then discovered that once he takes off his glasses he's actually Superman, would you still love him? Just chuckle—what's there to fuss about?" suggesting that she only became aware of Wang's family wealth after falling in love with him. On 10 November 2010, in response to the ongoing criticism of their relationship, Hsu and Wang both quit Weibo. In her farewell post, Hsu referred to actress Ruan Lingyu (1910–1935), who is widely believed to have died by suicide as a result of gossip: "Everyone I have loved, I came to know not through media reports or by measuring his wealth. If only love were that simple. From now on, I will shut down my Weibo. Compared with those in history who lost their lives for fear of gossip, my departure is only a small protest against the blind absurdity of public trial." Hsu returned to Weibo in April 2011.

Hsu's star-studded, all-inclusive wedding in Sanya in March 2011 was widely criticized for perceived extravagance. The event booked out two five-star hotels, the Conrad Sanya Haitang Bay and the DoubleTree Resort by Hilton Haitang Bay, with a chartered flight from Taipei carrying her guests, drawing media estimates ranging from RMB 10 million to 30 million. Wang's mother Zhang Lan claimed the wedding cost less than RMB 1 million and said that her friend Wang Jianlin, chairman of Wanda Group and owner of the DoubleTree hotel, had sponsored the venue, a claim publicly denied by the Wanda heir, Wang Sicong. In December 2011, while guest-hosting Kangsi Coming, Hsu drew further backlash after remarking, "Shoes under NT$10,000 are really very cheap." She later explained that entertainers spending on wardrobe was a form of professionalism.

The controversy over Hsu's perceived extravagance and "gold-digging" subsided after CVC obtained an asset-freezing order from the Hong Kong High Court against Zhang Lan's holdings in March 2015, the beginning of the public downfall of South Beauty. Wang Sicong, who had an internet feud with Wang Xiaofei, quipped about the order: "Big S must've passed out crying in the bathroom. What's she gonna do now that her spare change is gone?"

=== COVID-19 pandemic ===
On 27 January 2020, during the early outbreak of the COVID-19 pandemic, when most countries prioritized domestic mask supplies and Taiwan imposed a mask export ban from 24 January to 23 February (later extending to June), Hsu and her then-husband, Wang Xiaofei, donated 10,000 masks purchased from Japan to Wuhan, sparking criticism from internet users in both Japan and Taiwan. Three days later, on 30 January, Wang announced that an additional 10,000 masks, originally intended for donation to mainland China, would instead be donated to Taiwan due to Taiwan's mask export ban, sparking criticism from internet users in China.

In June 2021, one week after she disclosed that she was divorcing from Wang, Hsu posted an Instagram story stating, "My Weibo account has been blocked, and my IG has been suspended! I just want to say: We are being massacred! Tsai! Massacring us," followed by "Isn't this a massacre?" She later added, "Um... Weibo and IG are actually fine... I just don't know how to use them... But I stand by what I said!" Through her agent, Hsu clarified that she was wondering, "When will all 23 million people in Taiwan finally have access to vaccines? We're not guinea pigs! Our lives matter too!" Hsu's comments, echoing Wang's posts on Weibo shortly before her announcement of an impending divorce and followed by her friend Pace Wu's public appeal for imported COVID-19 vaccines, were interpreted as blaming Taiwan's vaccination shortage on the Tsai Ing-wen administration, which at the time refused to import vaccines produced in mainland China and accused Beijing of sabotaging its efforts to procure vaccines from international manufacturers.

=== Zhang Lan's livestreaming ===
In 2020, Zhang Lan, a Chinese-Kittian businesswoman and mother of Wang Xiaofei, co-founded the hotpot brand Ma Liu Ji, primarily managed by Wang, and launched a Douyin-based livestreaming e-commerce business, which she operated mainly to promote the brand. Her pivot to livestreaming followed a series of setbacks, including her 2015 ousting from South Beauty, the restaurant chain she founded in 2000. She had sold the company to CVC Capital Partners in 2013 after failed IPO attempts during a bet-on agreement with CDH Investments and declining sales amid Xi Jinping's anti-corruption campaign. After the sale, CVC accused Zhang of misrepresentation and initiated arbitration through the China International Economic and Trade Commission (CIETAC), which awarded CVC over US$142 million. CVC enforced the award in Singapore, Hong Kong, and New York, securing asset-freeze orders in all three jurisdictions and piercing the Taiwan-based family trust nominally set up by Zhang for Wang and his children. In 2018, Zhang was sentenced in absentia by the Hong Kong High Court to one year in prison for contempt of court after failing to comply with its 2015 order, effectively rendering her a fugitive from Hong Kong.

During Hsu's marriage to Wang, Zhang regularly invoked Hsu's name in her livestreams, at times claiming Hsu would appear or simulating call-ins from her, though Hsu never participated. For three years following Hsu's divorce from Wang until her death, Zhang increasingly relied on Hsu's name and celebrity effect, frequently using abrasive parodies and spreading sensational rumors about Hsu and the Hsu family, generating high traffic but also drawing significant criticism for alleged sexism, misinformation, and cyberbullying—including from Wang, who publicly severed ties with his mother on three occasions during this period, citing her exploitation of Hsu as the primary reason. During the first major flare-up between Wang and Hsu, Zhang's livestream sales surpassed 100 million RMB in the ten-day period from 21 to 30 November 2022, a more than 100-fold increase, while her Douyin account gained over four million new followers. Another notorious example occurred in March 2024, when Barbie, making her first public appearance with Koo Jun-yup after their marriage, attended the funeral of Dee's grandfather-in-law. On the occasion, Barbie's black sheer outfit revealed undergarments under camera flashes, which Zhang later parodied in a livestream to promote undergarment sales. According to Ma Liu Ji CEO An Yong, the brand's online sales revenue was three to five times higher than that of its physical stores. Xu Jing, a media scholar at Xi’an Jiaotong University, described Zhang's livestreaming as a platform-driven "gossip economy" that stood out by blurring the line between e-commerce and tabloid entertainment.

In May 2024, after Zhang claimed on Douyin that Hsu's son had been expelled from school, Hsu refuted on Weibo, saying that she had filed for an injunction with the Beijing Internet Court over Zhang while appealing to the court, the All-China Women's Federation, the Cyberspace Administration of China, and Douyin to take action over Zhang's repeated spreading of false information. On 19 August 2024, the court granted Hsu's injunction, which Zhang effectively ignored the same day by posting a video in which a female host suggested Hsu, without naming her, meant to send Zhang and Wang to jail and questioned her fitness as a mother due to her remarriage with Koo three months after her divorce. The case was heard twice in court but had not reached a judgement by the time of Hsu's death in February 2025.

After Hsu's death, Zhang mourned her on Douyin. However, on 5 February 2025, Zhang endorsed a Douyin video where her godson, Xia Jian, falsely claimed that Wang had paid for the chartered flight carrying Hsu's ashes from Japan to Taiwan, prompting another dispute with Wang over her rumor-mongering for attention. After Dee, who paid for the flight, and the flight company denied Xia's claims, on 8 February, Hsu's first seventh-day memorial (頭七), Douyin indefinitely banned the accounts of Wang, Zhang, and Xia for spreading misinformation and "disrespect for the deceased," a decision endorsed by Chinese state media, including the Guangming Daily. In the 30 days leading up to her ban from Douyin, Zhang hosted 102 livestream sales sessions, generating between 10 million and 25 million RMB in revenue. Both Zhang and Wang contested the ban, with Wang claiming that he never spread misinformation. However, Zhang later approved of the ban, describing it as a way to "protect" her. Zhang continued to livestream on TikTok, Douyin's international version, and opened new accounts through her team on Douyin and other platforms.

Following Douyin, Weibo removed over 2,100 posts about Hsu containing "the falsehoods from external sites" and imposed penalties on over 100 accounts, including the suspension of live-streaming on Zhang's account. On 2 March, Kuaishou banned Wang and Zhang from posting videos on their accounts. From December 2025 to January 2026, in a series of outbursts and subsequently deleted posts on Weibo, Wang threatened legal action against Li Liang, a vice president of Douyin, over the banning of his accounts. Wang claimed the actions were motivated by personal bias, which he alleged stemmed from Li’s Taiwanese wife.

=== Jacky Wu's livestreaming ===
After Hsu's death, her Guess co-host Jacky Wu, who had initially expressed mourning, criticized Hsu and her family during a livestream sales session in July 2025, suggesting that the Hsu sisters had betrayed and defamed him. Wu, who had appeared in Zhang Lan’s livestreams in 2023 amid controversy over her alleged exploitation of Hsu, stated that he regretted not warning his friend Wang Xiaofei about Hsu’s character before their marriage. Wu added that his family, including his daughter—who was then serving as the stand-in host of Dee Girls’ Talk during Dee’s bereavement leave—had no personal friendship with the Hsu sisters, whom he disparaged as "ill-bred." His outburst was reportedly prompted by a series of grievances and misunderstandings but was ultimately rooted in a longstanding resentment toward the sisters for their siding with actress Vicky Chen and television producer Chan Jen-hsiung, a longtime collaborator with the sisters, in a love triangle more than two decades earlier. At the time, Wu publicly pursued and dated Chen until singer Huang An revealed that Wu was already in a de facto marriage with children, a concealment that drew criticism from the Hsu sisters. Wu later explained that his comments had been misinterpreted by the media and were in fact directed at disgraced Mickey Huang. Matilda Tao mocked Wu’s explanation, saying that he had either forgotten what he said or that the video was generated by AI.

=== Drug abuse allegations ===
Hsu was accused by multiple people of drug use, but none was confirmed. After their divorce, Hsu's ex-husband Wang Xiaofei repeatedly accused Hsu, along with her sister Dee, of the misuse of the sedative Stilnox through others' prescriptions, an allegation he apologized for on Weibo after first making it in May 2022, calling it "the most regrettable thing in my life" but never disputed its truthfulness. Wang claimed that he used to pay over NT$1 million each month for Hsu's drugs and that "Stilnox ruined my whole family." Hsu refuted the allegations by stating that both she and her sister had "heart conditions" that made drug use unfeasible, and attributed Wang's claim to retaliation after she refused to publicly support his claim of marital fidelity. On 22 March 2023, after Wang attempted to forcibly enter Hsu's residence in Taipei over a child custody dispute, he was taken away to the police station, where he told the police and media that his child was being "illegally detained" by Hsu and he intended to file a report accusing Hsu, along with Dee, of abusing Stilnox. He identified one of Hsu's former classmates as the person who delivered drugs to her on a weekly basis, claiming that evidence could be found in the CCTV footage from her residence at the Taipei Shin-yi complex. However, he left the police station without providing evidence or filing a report.

In June 2023, following multiple allegations of sexual misconduct against Mickey Huang, Dee's ex-boyfriend, he retaliated by accusing numerous celebrities of various offenses in a livestream before attempting self-harm and being hospitalized. Among those named were the Hsu sisters and their associates Aya Liu, Mavis Fan, Lawrence Chou, and Koo Jun-yup, all of whom Huang alleged had used drugs. He specifically claimed that during a trip to South Korea in 2000, he was pressured into taking Ecstasy by Dee, Barbie, and Koo at a hotel. Huang also claimed that Dee had escaped legal consequences after a Next Magazine cover story about her alleged "outdoor Ecstasy sex party" in August 2001, for which Dee, with other named parties, filed civil and criminal suits against the magazine. Dee won the civil trial in 2004 and later reached a settlement following the magazine's appeal, but was unable to withdraw the criminal case once it was taken up by public prosecutors, which led to a 2012 Taiwan Supreme Court ruling that sentenced the magazine's publisher to two months in prison, commutable to a fine, for violating privacy laws. In response to Huang, the Hsu sisters issued a joint statement expressing concern over his emotional state and refuting the allegations, noting that Barbie was not present at the party in question, that a 2004 court ruling had "legally cleared Dee's name," and that Koo—who had been investigated three times in South Korea for suspected drug use—had publicly denied the rumors in a 2009 press conference. In light of Huang's claims, the Taipei District Prosecutors Office investigated the Hsu sisters, Fan, and Koo—excluding Liu and Chou, who resided abroad and whom Huang did not witness using drugs—by testing their hair and urine samples. Three of the women tested positive for sedatives such as Stilnox, but consistent with prescribed medications from outpatient visits, while Koo tested negative. As for Huang's allegation of being forcibly administered Ecstasy in South Korea, prosecutors found he was unable to provide specific details regarding the time, location, or circumstances. As the incident allegedly occurred outside Taiwan's jurisdiction and beyond the 20-year statute of limitations, the case was closed without charges in May 2024.

In June 2023, shortly after Huang's allegations, Taiwanese paparazzo Ryan Ko claimed on a television program that he had heard from sources about a drug dealer supplying narcotics to the Hsu sisters. In response, Barbie and Dee filed a civil defamation lawsuit against Ko, seeking NT$2 million each in damages. In November, the Taipei District Court ruled that Ko lacked sufficient evidence and ordered him to pay NT$300 thousand to each sister. Ko did not appeal but stated that he lost the civil case—which, unlike a criminal case, does not determine whether he knowingly made a false statement—because he refused to disclose his sources. Ko described the lawsuit as Hsu scapegoating him for Huang, while Hsu's agent Angelina Liao, in a phone call secretly recorded by Ko after falsely assuring that it was off the record, explained that prosecutors had barred them from suing Huang due to the ongoing investigation, an excuse Ko dismissed. The financial burden from the case prompted Ko to seek assistance from Wang, who covered NT$220,000 out of the NT$600,000 Ko was ordered to pay after declining to serve as a witness for Ko in the case. The lawsuit became a turning point that shifted Ko, who had risen to fame for exposing Wang's affairs in May 2022, against the Hsu sisters and in favor of Wang. Initially, the sisters sought to ease Ko's burden by withholding bank account details for the payment, but enforced it in late 2024 after Ko became a de facto mouthpiece for Wang in the ongoing publicity battle.

== Discography ==
As SOS and ASOS:

Title	Album details
佔領年輕 - 至少我深愛過一次	Released: 1994; Label: Pony Canyon
Best of SOS	Released: 1995; Label: Pony Canyon
天天寄出的信	Released: 1995; Label: Pony Canyon
姐妹情深	Released: 1995; Label: Pony Canyon
我是女菩薩	Released: 1996; Label: Pony Canyon
顛覆歌	Released: 1996; Label: Pony Canyon
貝殼	Released: 1997; Label: Pony Canyon
變態少女	Released: 2001; Label: Skyhigh Entertainment Co., Ltd

== Filmography ==
=== Film ===
Year	Title	Role	Notes	Ref.
2005	The Ghost Inside	Lin Xiaoyue		
2006	Silk	Su		
2008	Connected	Grace Wong		
2008	My So Called Love	Kitty		
2009	On His Majesty's Secret Service	Mei Xiwang (Hopeful)		
2010	Hot Summer Days	Dingdang		
2010	Future X-Cops	Wang Xue'e (Miss Holly)		
2010	Adventure of the King	Phoenix		
2010	Reign of Assassins	Zhanqing		
2011	My Kingdom	Xi Mu Lang		
2012	Croczilla	Wei Yan		
2012	Motorway	Yee		

=== Television series ===
Year	Title	Role	Notes	Ref.
2001	Meteor Garden	Shan Cai		
2002	Meteor Garden II	Shan Cai		
2002	The Monkey King: Quest for the Sutra	Xuepo Daxian		
2003	Eternity: A Chinese Ghost Story	Nie Xiao Qian		
2004	Mars	Han Qi Luo		
2004	Say Yes Enterprise 求婚事务所	Xiao Niao		
2005	Phantom Lover 夜半歌声	Tong Ruo Fan		
2007	Corner With Love	Yu Xin Lei		
2010	Summer's Desire	Yin Xia Mo		

=== Variety shows ===
- Chao Meng XYZ: 1995
- Qingchun Baomazai: 1995
- Guess Guess Guess: 1998 to 2000
- 100% Entertainment: 1998 to 2005
- Weekend Three Precious Fun: 2001
- Gourmet Secrets of the Stars: 2007 to 2008
- Let's Dance: 2008 to 2009
- The Brain: 2017
- Miss Beauty: 2018
- We Are Real Friends: 2019
- We've Grown Up: 2019
- After Becoming Mother: 2020

== Bibliography ==
Year	Title	Type	Ref.
1996	SOS Chao Meng Qing Chun	Memoir	
1998	SOS Tokyo Shopping Map	Travel guide	
2003	Barbie Essence	Photobook	
2004	Beauty Queen	Beauty guide	
2005	Penny Dreadful	Poetry book	
2007	Beauty Queen II	Beauty guide	
2015	Lao Niang Jia Dao	Memoir	

== Awards and nominations ==
Year	Ceremony	Category	Nominated work	Result	Ref.
2001	Golden Bell Awards	Best Leading Actress in a TV Series	Meteor Garden	Nominated	
2008	Hong Kong Film Awards	Best Actress	Connected	Nominated	
2008	Shanghai Television Festival	Best Actress	Corner with Love	Nominated	
2011	Guangdong, Hong Kong and Macao Youth Film Festival	Best Supporting Actress	Reign of Assassins	Nominated	
2012	Macau International Movie Festival	Best Actress	Croczilla	Won	
2012	Shanghai International Film Festival	Film Channel Media Award: Best Actress	Croczilla	Nominated	
