= RYB (disambiguation) =

RYB (red–yellow–blue) is a historical set of colors used in subtractive color mixing and is one commonly used set of primary colors.

RYB may also refer to:

- RYB Education, Chinese company
- Staroselye Airport, IATA airport code RYB, airport in Rybinsk, Yaroslavl, Russia
- Royal Bahrain Airlines, ICAO airline code RYB, see List of airline codes (R)
- Roy Bridge railway station, rail station code RYB, railway station in Roybridge, Highland, Scotland, United Kingdom
