= Silk (2006 film) =

- Film poster
- Traditional Chinese: 詭絲
- Simplified Chinese: 诡丝
- Literal meaning: weird silk
- Hanyu Pinyin: Guǐ Sī
- Directed by: Su Chao-bin
- Written by: Su Chao-bin
- Produced by: Jimmy Huang
- Starring: Chang Chen; Yōsuke Eguchi; Janine Chang; Chen Bolin; Barbie Hsu; Karena Lam
- Cinematography: Arthur Wong
- Edited by: Cheung Ka-fai
- Music by: Peter Kam
- Distributed by: CMC Entertainment
- Release dates: September 28, 2006 (Hong Kong); September 29, 2006 (Taiwan)
- Running time: 108 minutes
- Country: Taiwan
- Language: Mandarin
- Box office: $854,535

Silk (詭絲) is a 2006 Taiwanese horror film directed by Su Chao-Bin. It was screened out of competition at the 2006 Cannes Film Festival.

== Plot ==
In Taipei, a team of ghost hunters pay a freelance camera man to photograph places looking for paranormal activity. From the sounds of things, previous attempts have been unsuccessful. The cameraman is taking his pictures and this time captures a picture of a boy in a seemingly empty room. The team of ghost hunters are thrilled and take it upon themselves to further investigate.

They bring a police officer, a sharp shooter and a lip reader for further help in their investigation for further study of the ghost. The officer has a sick mother who is in a coma and has a deteriorating body. Though the officer refuses to offer help in the initial stages, he accepts the case due to curiosity. The director of the program calls the team to give up their research as it seems worthless and is costly to the Japanese government. The team reveals a magnetic cube which can split itself and capture energy of any form. Its capacity to hold energy is such that it can withstand the force of gravity and float in air. The director agrees to offer further support. It is further revealed that the walls of the room of the captured ghost are packed with thousands of such cubes to obstruct the movement of the ghost boy.

The inclusion of a police officer angers one of the teammates who decides to take revenge on the team. She steps into the room of the captured ghost and sprays an energy synchronizer which allows her to capture the ghost inside her pocket. The team which arrives later is shocked at the missing ghost and demands she tells the truth. In the meantime, the ghost escapes from her pocket and kills her. Her soul appears for a short span of time and vanishes.

Further observation reveals that the captured ghost follows a fixed pattern of activities like staring out of the window and trying to walk through a door at a particular time. This causes the team to set the ghost boy free into the open world to trace his activities. The police officer follows the boy to his school which apparently was the place of his death. The ghost boy was also found to leave a trace of silk strands along his foot steps.

Investigation in the school reveals clues pointing to the place and cause of his death. They follow the clues to a dead body, and conclude that he was strangled to death by his own mother. This produced a strong hate in him which has made his soul restless. Furthermore, the body of the boy is found to be in the center of a nuclear fusion reactor whose magnetic flux is also found to have caused his unstable soul.

The police officer doubts a relation between the ghost boy and the silk strands. He follows the silk strands which leads him to a sick woman in a hospital, who dies shortly afterwards. The director issues orders to cease the project again, which angers the team leader. The team leader captures the soul of the boy in a magnetic cube and leaves without a trace. This causes the soul of the boy's mother to take revenge on all the people involved in the team by killing them.

The mother ghost tries to kill the police officer's girlfriend. The police officer arrives at the scene with a sniper rifle and sprays the bullets with holy water. The police officer saves his girlfriend but the ghost mother chases after him. He drives away and crashes his car into a subway entrance. He escapes into a train, but the ghost mother manages to catch him. His girlfriend calls him and he tells her to check on his mom in the hospital. He apologizes to his girlfriend and prepares to be killed by the ghost mother. She reaches into his heart and stops it.

The team leader sets the ghost boy free and kills himself in the same spot as the boy so that he can turn into a ghost. The boy, now released, goes to where the police officer is, reaches into his heart and revives him. He and his mother, both as ghosts, hug. The police officer then calls the team leader to tell him that the team leader was wrong. The boy's energy wasn't stuck in the world because of hate, it was because of his bond with his mother. The police officer returns home. He finds his mother's ghost sitting in his living room. He asks if she is angry at him. She doesn't reply and stands up, puts an egg into a pot, and disappears. The police officer stares at the egg in the pot, and it disappears just like his mother. It is revealed that his girlfriend signed her death certificate at the hospital as the patient's daughter-in-law.

== Cast ==
- Chang Chen as Tung
- Yōsuke Eguchi as Hashimoto
- Karena Lam as Wei
- Barbie Hsu as Su
- Chen Bolin as Ren
- Janine Chang as Mei
- Wanfang as Ghost Mother
- Leon Dai as SWAT Leader
- Jag Huang as Bomb Squad B
- Kevin S. Smith as James

== Remake ==
In 2009, it was revealed that Gold Circle Films was looking to develop an American remake of Silk.
