= Adventure of the King =

2010 Hong Kong film by Chung Shu-kai

- Traditional Chinese: 龍鳳店
- Simplified Chinese: 龙凤店
- Hanyu Pinyin: Lóngfèng Diàn
- Directed by: Chung Shu-kai
- Written by: Tsang Kan-cheung; Chan Man-keung Chan; Lee Si-cheun
- Produced by: Jimmy Heung; Ying Zi
- Starring: Richie Jen; Barbie Hsu; Huo Siyan; Law Kar-ying
- Cinematography: Chan Chi-ying; Tony Cheung
- Edited by: Wenbers Li Tung-Chuen
- Music by: Liu Wen
- Production companies: Yongsheng Film Production Co., LTD
- Distributed by: Xinyuanye Entertainment Media Co., LTD; Shanghai East Film and Television Issuing Company; Beijing Wuzilong Film and Television Media Co., LTD; China Film Group Corporation
- Release date: 19 August 2010
- Running time: 110 minutes
- Countries: Hong Kong; China
- Languages: Mandarin; Cantonese

Adventure of the King is a 2010 Hong Kong historical romantic comedy film directed by Chung Shu-kai and written by Tsang Kan-cheung, Chan Man-keung, and Lee Si-cheun. The film stars Richie Jen, Barbie Hsu, Huo Siyan, and Law Kar-ying. The film premiered in Hong Kong and Mainland China on 19 August 2010.

== Plot ==
It tells the love story between Zhengde Emperor and Li Fengjie, during the Ming Dynasty.

== Cast ==
=== The royals ===
- Richie Jen as Zhengde Emperor, the Ming dynasty Emperor of China between 1505 and 1521.
- Huo Siyan as Infanta Chang Ci, Zhengde Emperor's sister.
- Fu Yiwei as Empress Zhang, Zhengde Emperor's mother.
- Law Kar-ying as Sima Xi, an official historian of Ming Dynasty.
- Leung Siu-lung as Chen Zhenzhen, Zhengde Emperor's bodyguard.
- Zhang Hongbin as Wang Siliang, Zhengde Emperor's imperial physician.
- Liu Yajin as Xu Fu, Ouchi manager.
- Wang Yu as Wang Yangming, idealist Neo-Confucian philosopher, official, educationist, calligraphist and general in the Ming dynasty.
- Bai Qing as Tangshi Zhongxia, a member of Jinyiwei.
- Chen Zhihui as Kuang Ye.
- Ji Shan as The princess of Shengping Country.
- Fung Hark-on as the robber.
- Cui Jian as the eunuch.

=== Faction of Zhu Chenhao ===
- Lin Wei as Zhu Chenhao, a member of Ming Dynasty's Royal Family.
- Wu Ma as Ma Duofu, a worker under Zhu Chenhao.
- He Yunwei as Private Adviser Ji, Zhu Chenhao's counsellor.

=== Member of Longfeng Restaurant ===
- Barbie Hsu as Li Fengjie, the boss of Longfeng Restaurant.
- Chiu Chi-ling as Laogui, the cook of Longfeng Restaurant.
- Pan Changjiang as Li Xiaochong, Li Fengjie's elder brother.
- Miumiu Gong as Miao Miao, a worker of Longfeng Restaurant.

=== Guest star ===
- Fung Hak-on as Thief
- Alan Chui Chung-San as Beggar Clan's Top Fighter
- Zhou Libo as Wen Zhengming.
- Huang Xiaoming as Tang Yin.
- Natalis Chan as Zhu Yunming.

== Music ==
- Richie Jen – My Sweetheart.
- Richie Jen – Everlasting Love

== Production ==
This film took place in Hengdian World Studios, Zhejiang.

== Release ==
On 12 August 2010, Chung Shu Kai, Richie Jen, Huo Siyan and Barbie Shu attended the Press Conference in Guangzhou, and it was released on 19 August 2010.

== Critical response ==
The film received negative reviews.
