= Future X-Cops =

2010 Hong Kong-Chinese-Taiwanese film by Wong Jing

- Hong Kong film poster
- Directed by: Wong Jing
- Written by: Wong Jing
- Produced by: Venus Keung
- Starring: Andy Lau; Barbie Hsu; Fan Bingbing; Xu Jiao; Ma Jingwu; Mike He
- Cinematography: Venus Keung
- Edited by: Li Ka-wing
- Music by: Raymond Wong
- Production company: China Film Group Corporation
- Distributed by: Mega-Vision Pictures Ltd.
- Release dates: April 15, 2010 (Hong Kong); March 30, 2010 (China); April 2, 2010 (Taiwan)
- Running time: 101 minutes
- Countries: Hong Kong; China; Taiwan
- Language: Cantonese

Future X-Cops (Mei loi ging chaat 未來警察) is a 2010 science fiction action film directed by Wong Jing. The film is about terrorists Kalong (Louis Fan) and Feina (Tang Yifei) who travel back in time to attempt to assassinate Professor Ma (Ma Jingwu). The two are chased by the cyborg cop Zhou Zhihao (Andy Lau) who has also traveled back in time to stop them.

The film was delayed in post-production to work on the special effects. The film performed well in Hong Kong where it was the second highest-grossing film in its opening week.

== Plot ==
In 2080, in an unnamed Asian metropolis, cyborg terrorists attempt to assassinate Professor Ma (Ma Jingwu) on the tenth anniversary of his energy-saving Solar Canopy but are defeated by the cyborg cop Zhou Zhihao (Andy Lau). Zhou's wife, Meili (Fan Bingbing) is then killed and terrorist leader Kalong (Louis Fan) and his wife Feina (Tang Yifei) manage to escape arrest. Kalong and Feina travel back in time to 2020 to try to assassinate the teenage Ma but are pursued by Zhou and his daughter Qiqi (Xu Jiao). Posing as a traffic cop, Zhou attracts the attention of policewoman Wang Xue'e (Barbie Hsu), who falls in love with him.

== Cast ==
- Andy Lau as Zhou Zhihao (Kidd Zhou)
- Xu Jiao as Zhou Qiqi (Kiki Zhou)
- Barbie Hsu as Wang Xue'e (Miss Holly)
- Fan Bingbing as Meili and Millie (Guest star)
- Ma Jingwu as Professor Ma (Professor Masterson)
- Tang Yifei as Feina (Fiona)
- Louis Fan as Kalong (Kalon)
- Mike He as Ma Jinxiang (Sergeant Masterson)
- Zhang Li as Huo Li Shuyi
- Liu Yiwei as Druggie
- Ding Sheng as Tie
- Law Kar-ying as Scissors
- Blackie Chen as Misfortune, the young undercover 2020 cop
- Huang Licheng as a 2080 cop
- Chen Xiaofeng as Kabao
- Xiao Jian as Stone

== Production ==
To create the special effects for the film, Andy Lau wore a green jumpsuit which allowed computer-generated armor to be seen on his body. Future X-Cops was delayed due to a lengthy post-production process in Korea that was made to boost the films visual effects. There were rumors of financial woes of one of the film's investors which director Wong Jing denied.

== Release ==
Future X-Cops was released in China on March 30 and in Taiwan on April 2, 2010. The film grossed a total of $27,037 in Taiwan. It was released in Hong Kong on April 15 where it premiered in second place in box office rankings for that week. The film grossed a total of $439,978 in Hong Kong.

== Reception ==
Film Business Asia gave the film a four out of ten rating noting poor effects, uneven acting, and "pothole-sized gaps in logic and continuity, even by Hong Kong genre standards." Twitch Film gave the film a poor review stating that there was "honestly nothing to recommend in this film" and that it was "troubling to see how well it has been performing at the mainland box office. Its opening weekend here in Hong Kong is also seeing it beat out other new releases like Monga and Kick-Ass, both of which are far superior films."
