= Croczilla =

2012 Chinese film

- Chinese theatrical release poster
- Traditional Chinese: 百万巨鳄
- Hanyu Pinyin: Bai wan ju e
- Directed by: Lin Lisheng
- Written by: Lin Lisheng; Ma Hua; Ma Yu
- Produced by: Li Rui
- Starring: Barbie Hsu; Guo Tao; Lam Suet; Shi Zhaoqi; Xiong Xinxin
- Cinematography: Li Xi
- Edited by: Zhou Xinxia; Wei Nan
- Music by: Dong Dongdong
- Release date: June 8, 2012
- Running time: 87 minutes
- Country: China
- Budget: US$4.7 million

Croczilla (also known as Million Dollar Crocodile or The Crocodile) is a 2012 Chinese monster movie directed by Lin Lisheng. The film stars Barbie Hsu, Guo Tao, Lam Suet and is about a group of people seeking a crocodile that has swallowed a million yuan.

The film was released on June 8, 2012 and was promoted in some media as China's first monster movie.

== Plot ==
The film tells the story of an 8-meter long crocodile on the rampage in Hangzhou. Xiao befriends Amao, a 26-foot crocodile, who lives on his father's crocodile sanctuary. Soon his father is forced to sell the crocodiles to a gangster who plans to use them for high-priced meals. The story begins as the crocodile is released, swallows a fortune won by a local woman who forces the police to hunt it, and begins to terrorize the local town.

== Release ==
Croczilla was shown as a "work-in-progress" print at Marché du Film at the Cannes Film Festival in May 2012. Australian sales firm Odin's Eye Entertainment picked up the rights to Croczilla. The film was released in China on June 8, 2012. Croczilla was the opening film at the 36th Montreal World Film Festival.
