= Summer's Desire (2010 TV series) =

- OST cover
- Genre: Romance; Melodrama
- Based on: Pao Mo Zhi Xia by Ming Xiaoxi
- Written by: Lin Qile
- Directed by: Jiang Fenghong; Zhang Boyu
- Starring: Barbie Hsu; Peter Ho; Huang Xiaoming
- Opening theme: I Remember I've Loved by Peter Ho
- Ending theme: Diamond by Barbie Shu
- Country of origin: Taiwan
- Original language: Mandarin
- No. of episodes: 26

Production
- Producer: Peter Ho
- Production location: Taipei
- Production company: Three-Giant Production

Original release
- Network: Formosa Television (FTV)
- Release: 30 May – 29 August 2010

Related
- Summer's Desire (2018 TV series)

Summer's Desire (Chinese: 泡沫之夏; pinyin: Pao Mo Zhi Xia; lit. 'Summer of Foam') is a 2010 Taiwanese drama series starring Barbie Hsu, Peter Ho and Huang Xiaoming. It is based on the novel of the same name by Ming Xiaoxi. The television series was produced by Three-Giant Production with Peter Ho as producer.

The series was first broadcast in Taiwan on free-to-air Formosa Television (FTV) from 30 May – 29 August 2010, every Sunday from 22:00 to 23:30. It was nominated for Best Marketing at the 46th Golden Bell Awards in 2011.

== Synopsis ==
Yin Xiamo and Luo Xi are orphans, both having met each other at their adoptive parents’ home. Because of the shadows remaining from their childhood, they are both shrouded in the midst of wariness. However, when Xia Mo and her brother meet an embarrassing situation during a singing competition, Luo Xi helps them out, and the iciness that separates both of them gradually melts. Seeing what has happened, as well as in an attempt to break both of them up, Ou Chen, who deeply loves Xia Mo and is the heir to the company that founded their school, sends Luo Xi to England to study.

Five years later, Luo Xi has become a superstar, with a countless number of fans to his name. Xia Mo having become an orphan once again as her adoptive parents died the year Luo Xi left, is a new artist of a records company and meets Luo Xi. Ou Chen on the other hand, having lost his memory of Xia Mo five years ago due to a car accident, also sees Xia Mo once again as well. With all three main characters back on the scene and their disputes of love and hate, what will happen between them then? Who will Xia Mo pick in the end?

== Cast ==
=== Main ===
- Barbie Hsu as Yin Xiamo
- Peter Ho as Ou Chen
- Huang Xiaoming as Luo Xi

=== Supporting ===
- Kris Shen as Yin Cheng
- Serena Fang as Jiang Zhenen
- Chang Kuo-chu as Xi Meng
- Fu Peici as young Xia Mo
- Wang Zhengwei as young Luo Xi
- Chen Lingzhen as young Ouchen
- Canti Lau as Xia Yingbo
- Patina Lin as Shen Qiang
- Ke Huanru as Pan Nan
- Maggie Wu as An Huini
- Yang Ko-han as Ling Hao
- Coco Jiang as Wei An
- Liu Shuting as Yao Shu'er
- Huang Yi as Luo Xi's mother
- Chen Chen as Jie Ni
- Deng Ning as A Sen
- Zhao Shun as Yin's father
- Ying Cailing as Yin's mother
- Zhang Kefan as Jam
- Lin Mei-hsiu as Cai Ni
- Irene Xu as Fang Jinhua
- Qi Wei as Ou Chen's fake girlfriend
- Yue Yaoli as Ou Chen's grandfather
- Blackie Chen as Host
- Makiyo as Host
- Francesca Kao as Luna

== Soundtrack ==
Summer's Desire - Original Television Soundtrack (泡沫之夏电视剧原声音乐大碟)
No.	Title	Music	Length
1.	"I Remember I've Loved (我記得我愛過")"	Peter Ho
2.	"Diamond (鑽石)"	Barbie Shu
3.	"Black Cat & Milk (黑猫与牛奶)"	Huang Xiaoming
4.	"Mermaid in the Foam (泡沫美人鱼)"	Barbie Shu
5.	"This is Love (就是爱)"	Barbie Shu
6.	"Pretense (假面)"	Peter Ho

== International broadcast ==
In Japan, the drama was aired on cable channel DATV with Japanese subtitles from 16 May – 31 October 2011 for 24 episodes.
