= Mars (Taiwanese TV series) =

- Also known as: 戰神MARS; Zhànshén MARS
- Genre: Romance; Suspense; Action
- Based on: Mars by Fuyumi Soryo
- Written by: Xu Yu Ting (徐譽庭); Yu Xiao Hui (于小慧)
- Directed by: Cai Yuexun (蔡岳勳)
- Starring: Barbie Hsu; Vic Chou
- Opening theme: "零" [Zero] by Alan Kuo (柯有倫)
- Ending theme: "讓我愛你" [Let Me Love You] - Vic Chou and Barbie Hsu
- Country of origin: Taiwan
- Original language: Mandarin
- No. of episodes: 21

Production
- Producer: Chai Zhi Ping (柴智屏)
- Production company: Comic Ritz Production

Original release
- Network: Chinese Television System (CTS)
- Release: July 31 – October 23, 2004

Mars (traditional Chinese: 戰神MARS; simplified Chinese: 战神MARS; pinyin: Zhànshén; lit. 'War-God MARS') is a Taiwanese drama starring Barbie Hsu (aka Da S) and Vic Chou of F4, who reunited since Meteor Garden and its sequel Meteor Garden II. It is based on the Japanese shōjo manga series Mars, written by Fuyumi Soryo. It was produced by Comic Ritz International Production and Chai Zhi Ping as producer and directed by Cai Yuexun.

The series was broadcast in Taiwan in 2004 on free-to-air Chinese Television System (CTS) and cable TV Gala Television (GTV) Variety Show/CH 28. It was the 2005 Most Popular Drama of the Year at the 40th Golden Bell Awards, Taiwan.

In 2016 it was remade with the same name in Japan.

== Synopsis ==
Chen Ling (陳零) and Chen Sheng (陳聖) (both by Vic Chou) are twin brothers born out of wedlock, by a father who is their mother's brother-in-law, and has died in a racing incident. Their one childhood memory of their mother is that of a medicated cold bed-bound woman, whose only words were that "in this world Sheng is the only one Ling can rely on and Ling is the only one Sheng can rely on".

One day Ling meets Qi Luo, an introvert and a gentle girl, in a park where he asks her for directions. She draws the directions for Ling on the back of one of her sketches of a mother and child. Ling seeing her quietly drawing on a park bench reminds him of Sheng and becomes attracted to her. When Ling saves Qi Luo from being sexually harassed by their English teacher, she starts to open up to him. In exchange for the finished painting of 'Mother and Child', Ling promises to protect her.

== Cast ==
- Vic Chou as Chen Ling and Chen Sheng
- Barbie Hsu as Han Qi-luo
- Hsiu Chieh-kai as An Da-ye
- Megan Lai as Lai Qing-mei
- An Jun Can as Fan Tong-dao
- Xiao Xiao as Sha Zhi
- Duo Ru Ru as Xiang Zi
- Chang Kuo-chu as Chong Zhi
- Leon Dai as Ming Gao
- Ying Cai Ling (應采靈) as Qi Luo's mother
- Tang Zhi Wei as Qi Luo's stepfather
- Lin Li Yang Ming Gao's friend
- Ding Ning as Chong Zhi's secretary
- Kingone Wang (cameo) as Ling and Sheng's biological father
- Renzo Liu as Professor Shi
- Guo Shi Lun
- Huang Tai-an as Ah Jian
- Lee Lee-zen as Chen Chung-chih (youth)

== Soundtrack ==
- Opening theme song: "零" (Ling) [Zero] – Alan Kuo (柯有倫)
- Ending theme song: "讓我愛你" (Rang Wo Ai Ni) [Let Me Love You] - Vic Chou and Barbie Hsu

Mars Original Soundtrack (戰神MARS 電視原聲帶)

- Released: 10 September 2004
- Label: Sony Music Entertainment (Taiwan)
- Language: Mandarin
- Format: Studio album
- Genre: Mandopop

Track listing

1. "零" (Ling) [Zero] - Alan Kuo (柯有倫) – opening theme
2. "讓我愛你" (Rang Wo Ai Ni) [Let Me Love You] – Vic Chou and Barbie Hsu (周渝民 and 徐熙媛) - ending theme
3. "白色戀曲" (Bai Se Lian Qu) [White Concerto] – RaRa
4. "The Hardest Note" – Megan Lai (賴雅妍)
5. "說愛我" (Shuo Ai Wo) [Say You Love Me] – Liang Yi Zhen (梁一貞)
6. "明天" (Ming Tian) [Tomorrow] – Da Di Le Tuan (大地樂團)
7. "我可以" (Wo Ke Yi) [I Can] – You Hong Ming (遊鴻明)
8. "零" (零的自我分裂之歌) [Zero – instrumental]
9. "我可以" (達也的深情吶喊之歌) [I Can – instrumental]
10. "讓我愛你" (綺羅的壓抑情感之歌) [Let Me Love You – instrumental]
11. "說愛我" (晴美的渴望有愛版之歌) [Say You Love Me – instrumental]
12. "白色戀曲" (桐島的白色之歌) [White Concerto – instrumental]

== Book ==
- Mars Photobook (戰神MARS電視寫真書) – ISBN 957-29637-3-2

== International broadcast ==
In Thailand, it aired on Channel 3 on Friday to Sunday at 22:05 p.m. to 22:50 p.m., from October 15, 2004. and its re-run on Mondays to Thursdays at 2:15 a.m. to 3:00 a.m., from September 8 to October 27, 2015. This is the first rerun of this series in Thailand since its premiered 11 years ago.
