= Blackie Chen =

Taiwanese entertainer (born 1977)

Charles "Blackie" Chen
- 陳建州
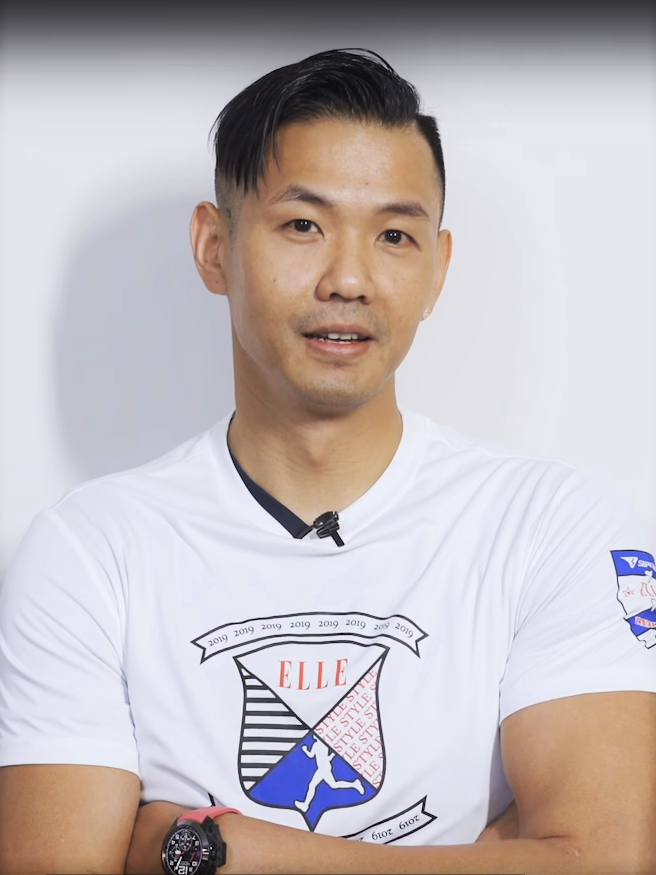
- Chen in 2019
- Born: 2 May 1977 (age 49); Kaohsiung, Taiwan
- Education: Chinese Culture University
- Years active: 2000-present
- Spouse: Christine Fan (m. 2011)
- Children: 2

Chinese name
- Traditional Chinese: 陳建州
- Simplified Chinese: 陈建州
Transcriptions
Standard Mandarin
- Hanyu Pinyin: Chén Jiànzhōu
Yue: Cantonese
- Jyutping: Can4 Gin3 Zau1
Southern Min
- Hokkien POJ: Tân Kiàn-chiu
- Musical career
- Also known as: Charles Chen

Charles "Blackie" Chen or Chen Chien-Chou (born 2 May 1977) is a Taiwanese TV celebrity, basketball player and sports manager. He is the founder of the Taiwanese professional basketball league P. League+.

== Career ==
=== Basketball ===
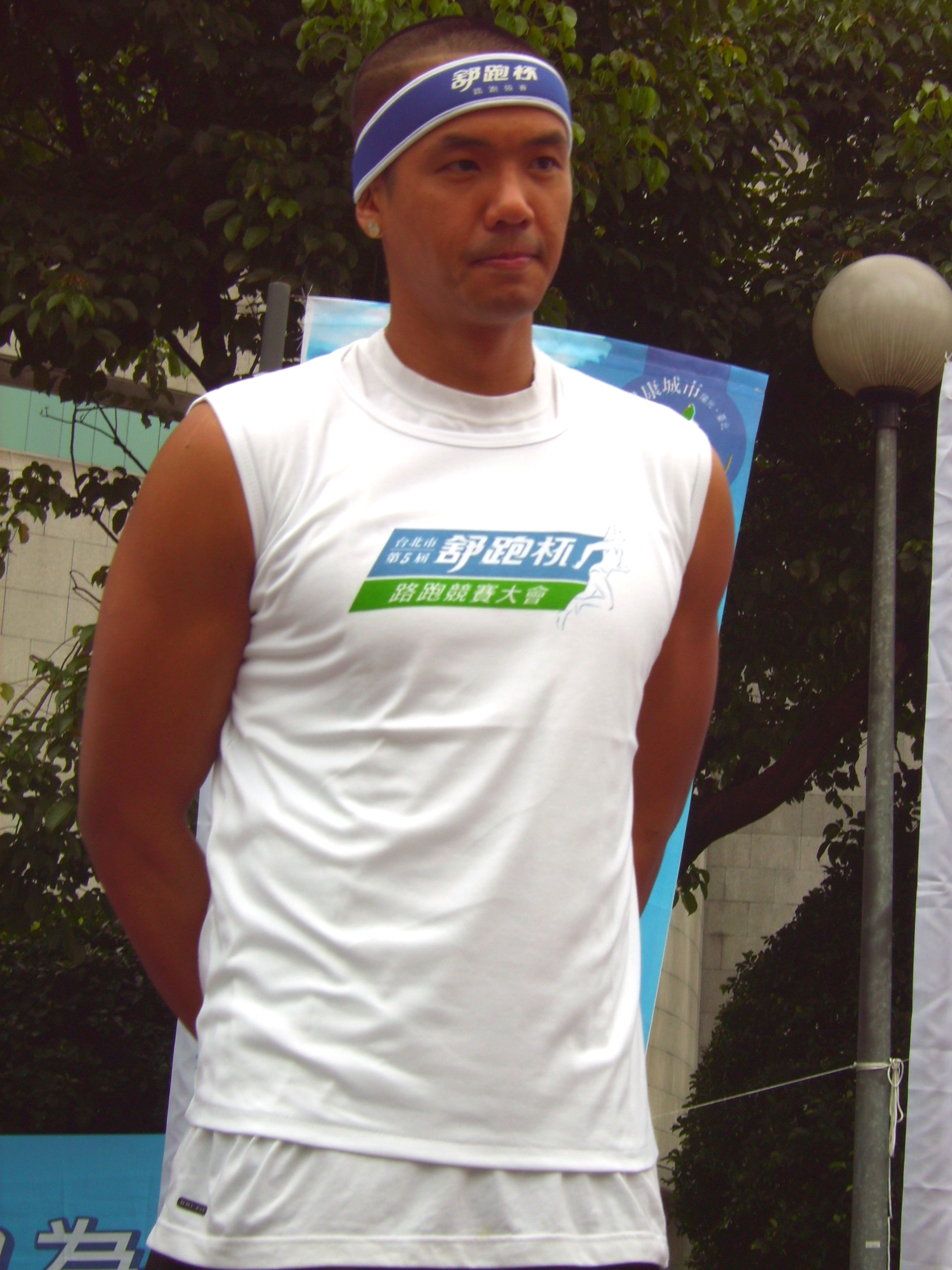
Chen at the 5th Taipei Supau Cup Mini-Marathon in 2007

Chen Chien-Chou made the Chinese Taipei junior national team when he was 18 and played in the 1995 ABC Under-18 Championship, where they finished 5th.

Although only 190 cm (short for even Taiwanese basketball player standards), Chen played in the paint. He modeled his game after Charles Barkley, also an undersized big man (hence his English name of "Charles Chen"). In 1999, after missing the cut for the Chinese Taipei national basketball team, he played for the B national team at the William Jones Cup.

Later, playing for a club in the Singaporean league (where he led the league in scoring and rebounding), he tore his anterior cruciate ligament for the second time in an accident. His basketball career ended prematurely as a result.

In 2020, along with Taipei Fubon Braves, Formosa Dreamers, Hsinchu Lioneers, and Taoyuan Airape, he founded a Taiwanese professional basketball league, P. League+, and was the CEO.

=== Entertainment ===
Chen became a performing artist, and a host of numerous variety shows. Because of his dark skin, he has come to be known by the nickname "Blackie", it is also because the name rhymes with Jackie Chan, in which they both are trained in judo, which Blackie obtained a blue belt. He has been in a relationship with Christine Fan for 10 years, before finally getting engaged in 2010. They were married in Taipei on May 7, 2011.

Currently the team leader and head of marketing for the Taiwan Beer Basketball Team, Chen directed a 2008 documentary entitled Attitude (態度) on the team's quest to become Super Basketball League champion. The documentary was well received and earned him widespread acclaim and accolades from the Taiwanese film industry. Many consider it the high-water mark of Taiwanese sports related documentary films.

Chen is also a television personality and host for several television shows. He is slated to play Peng Dehuai in the highly anticipated miniseries Untold Stories of 1949, to be produced for HBO Asia.

Chen, along with his wife Christine Fan, are also the co-founder and spokespeople for the Love Life campaign, after becoming a Christian, as influenced by her mother-in-law while Christine was recovering from severe depression and mild anorexia.

== Controversy ==
=== Sexual harassment allegations ===
In 2023, Taiwanese entertainer Tina Chou (周宜霈), known by her stage name "Big Tooth" (大牙), alleged Chen had sexually harassed her eleven years ago in Hong Kong. In support of Chou, Taiwanese entertainer Yuan Kuo (郭源元) revealed that she also had experienced an attempted sexual assault by Chen. Chen denied those accusations but resigned from the CEO of the Taiwanese professional basketball league P. League+. He and his wife Christine Fan filed a criminal defamation lawsuit against Chou asking for reputation damages of 10,000,000 TWD. The Taipei District Prosecutors Office ruled in favor of Chou, finding that she had not fabricated any facts, and dismissed the case with a decision of non-prosecution.

== Filmography ==
=== Film ===
Year	Title	Role	Notes
2001	Expect a Miracle (蘋果咬一口)		
2005	Perfect Match (天生絕配)	Charlie	
2007	I Wish (奇妙的旅程)	Lee Bing	
2008	Attitude (態度)	himself	documentary, also producer
2009	Love Life	himself	documentary, also producer
2009	The Wedding Game (大囍事)	Tom	
2010	Future X-Cops (未來警察)	Misfortune	
2013	Amazing (神奇)	Blackie	

=== Television series ===
Year	Title	Role	Notes
2001	Six Friends (青春六人行)		
2002	Purple Corner (紫色角落)	Chang Shih-chuan	
2002	Meteor Garden II (流星花園II)	Hsin	
2004	Love Bird (候鳥E人)	Wang Li-hsin	
2005	A Story of Soldiers (再見，忠貞二村)	Shao Chan-sheng	
2005	The Sour Pack (醋溜族)		
2006	Mico, Go! (米可，GO！)	Peter	
2007	The Teen Age (18禁不禁)	School Superintendent	
2010	Summer's Desire (泡沫之夏)	Host	cameo
2015	Lonely Gourmet (孤獨的美食家)	Charles	

=== Variety show host ===
- Channel [V] Pai Pai Zou (Chinese: 拍拍走; pinyin: Pāi Pāi Zǒu)
- asia+ Trivia Party
- Channel [V] Hei Se Hui Mei Mei(Chinese: 我愛黑澀會; pinyin: Wǒ Ài Hēi Sè Huì)
- Channel [V] - 青春全员集合
- Sanlih E-Television - 超級接班人

== See also ==
- Hei Se Hui Mei Mei
