= RYB Education =

Chinese preschool education company

- Native name: 红黄蓝教育
- Type: Public company
- Traded as: NYSE: GEHI
- Industry: Preschool education
- Founded: 1998
- Founder: Shi Yanlai (史燕来) and Cao Chimin (曹赤民)
- Headquarters: Beijing, China
- Area served: Mainland China
- Website: www.rybbaby.com

RYB Education (Chinese: 红黄蓝教育; NYSE: RYB) is a publicly listed company for preschool education in the People's Republic of China. As measured by annual total revenues in 2016, the company is the largest provider of early childhood education service in China. It owns three preschool-educational brands, namely RYB Parent-Child Garden, RYB Kindergarten, and Zhudou Parenting App-kit Club, and has strategic cooperation with some American preschool education institutes. The firm is listed on the New York Stock Exchange. The company was registered in the Cayman Islands, and its headquarter is in Beijing.

== Background ==
RYB Education was founded by Cao Chimin (曹赤民) and Shi Yanlai (史燕来) in 1998.

Shi Yanlai was a student in Peking University. She and Cao Chimin both obtained master's degree from Australian National University and Tsinghua University.

At the beginning, RYB Parent-Child Garden invited Liang Zhiyan (梁志焱) from Beijing Normal University to establish a teaching and research centre, and they developed some preschool courses. By the end of 1999, their first parent-child courses were started,. followed by courses aiming at various ages. In 2000, RYB Education obtained a licence for the education of 0-6-year-old kids from the education bureau. After three years, RYB Parent-Child Garden started to have direct educational institutes,.

In the year 2001, 38 shareholders of RYB Education established Beijing RYB Education Inc, and Shi Yanlai was appointed chairperson of the board of directors. In the same year, franchising started to be allowed.

RYB Education started trading on the New York Stock Exchange on 27 September 2017. Its documentation for the U.S. Securities and Exchange Commission showed the shareholding status: Ascendent Rainbow (Cayman) Limited was the principal shareholder, with 30.1 percent of the shares;. Cao Chimin, was second, with 23.6 percent, and Shi Yanla third, with 13.5 percent.

== Problems ==
During the expanding of the firm from 2010 to 2017, several RYB kindergartens were closed, or disappeared in Zhengzhou in Henan, Weifang in Shandong, Yibin in Sichuan, and Tianjin. There were also problems with disease: by the end of June 2016, several toddlers were infected with HFMD at RYB kindergartens in Wankecheng Branch in Qingdao.

=== Abuse claims ===
Some kindergartens under RYB Education has been reported to abuse toddlers. The first reported incident occurred in December 2015 in Tiexi District, Siping City, Jilin Province, China, where the RYB kindergarten was reported to abuse about 30 toddlers with needle stabbing. The kindergarten director claimed that since the kindergarten was monitored over CCTV, the teachers did not have chances to abuse the children. However, this kindergarten was closed by the Bureau of Education of Tiexi District, and 5 teachers were detained by the police. In 2016, four of the teachers were sentenced to two years and ten months' imprisonment for guardianship abuse. The prosecution accused the defendants of stabbing several children with sewing needles on their heads, limbs, buttocks, and legs, deliberately avoiding the CCTV, and threatening the children with punishment. These four defendants claimed they were not guilty, and they all lodged appeals. In December 2016, Intermediate People's Court of Siping, Jilin dismissed the appeals and upheld the original verdicts.

In April 2017, a video about the kindergarten circulated on the internet, showing kindergarten teacher hustling and kicking the children in their charge. That month, RYB Education established emergency group to track the incident, and said that it had exposed some problems on management that should be concentrated on and should be dealt by law. In November, 2017, more than ten parents of children at the Beijing school reported that their children in a class at RYB Education Xintiandi Kindergarten in Guanzhuang, Chaoyang District, Beijing were needle-abused and were given white pills of unknown ingredients, and provided a number of photos allegedly showed toddlers' pinholes. The Beijing Municipal Public Security Bureau Chaoyang Branch investigated. After the incident was reported on 23 November by the Beijing News, other media scrambled to report. Dozens of parents who wanted to know about the situation tried to meet with the registrar, asking to watch the kindergarten's surveillance video, but were stopped by the security guard.

On 25 November, the Beijing Municipal Public Security Bureau declared that one kindergarten teacher was detained for toddler abuse, and one parent was arrested for making up rumours. On 28 November, the Bureau sent a post on Sina Weibo that stated that nobody had sexually assaulted toddlers. The post also claimed that "feeding drugs" and "sexual assault" were rumours made up by the two parents.
