= Yue Yunpeng =

Chinese actor and xiangsheng performer (born 1985)

- 岳云鹏
- Born: 15 April 1985 (age 41); Puyang, Henan, China
- Occupations: Actor; xiangsheng performer
- Years active: 2004–present
- Agent: Deyunshe (德云社)
- Spouse: Zheng Min (m. 2011)

Chinese name
- Traditional Chinese: 岳雲鵬
- Simplified Chinese: 岳云鹏
Transcriptions
Standard Mandarin
- Hanyu Pinyin: Yuè Yúnpéng

Yue Yunpeng (Chinese: 岳云鹏; born 15 April 1985) is a Chinese actor and xiangsheng performer, best known in film for portraying Zhu Tianpeng in Buddies in India (2017), Yue Yunpeng in Top Funny Comedian: The Movie and Li Shuaiting in Revenge for Love. Mainly performing xiangsheng as the lead actor (Dougen), his current fixed partner is Sun Yue.

== Early life ==
Yue was born in Puyang, Henan on April 15, 1985. At the age of 14, he worked as a guard in a factory located in Shijingshan District of Beijing. He was also worked as waiter in restaurant during his early years.

== Career ==
Yue began his career as a xiangsheng proformer in 2004, after becoming a disciple of Guo Degang.

Yue's first screen acting credit was The Magistrate Ye Guangming (2010). And his first major film role was as Cai Baoqiang in Just For Fun (2012).

In 2015, Yue made a guest appearance as himself on Jian Bing Man, a superhero parody film starring Mabel Yuan, Ada Liu and Da Peng.

Yue starred with Deng Chao, Bai Baihe, Yang Yang, Zhang Tian'ai, Du Juan, and Ada Liu in Zhang Yibai's romantic drama film I Belonged to You (2016). That same year, he joined the main cast of Our Happiness as Yue Qiangnan.

In 2017, three films he headlined, Buddies in India, Revenge for Love and Goldbuster. He starred as Zhu Tianpeng, reuniting him with co-star Wang Baoqiang, who played Monkey King, in the action adventure comedy film Buddies in India. The film grossed US$107.9 million in Chinese box office. He was also cast in the film Revenge for Love, playing the love interest of Mabel Yuan's character. And he co-starred with Shen Teng and Zhang Yi in Sandra Ng's directorial debut Goldbuster. For his role as himself in Top Funny Comedian: The Movie, he was nominated for the Best Supporting Actor at the 9th Macau International Movie Festival. In April, he was invited to be the duet partner for the singer Li Jian in the finals of Singer 2017.

In 2018, Yue starred opposite Ge You and Du Chun in the adventure comedy film Mad Ebriety. He co-starred with Lin Chi-ling, who played his love interest in Guo Degang's directorial debut The Faces of My Gene. He landed a guest role on Feng Gong and Cui Junjie's comedy film Happiness Is Coming, which is set to premiere on June 8, 2018.

== Personal life ==
Yue Yunpeng married Zheng Min (郑敏) on April 26, 2011.

== Filmography ==
=== Film ===
Year	English title	Chinese title	Role	Notes
2012	Just For Fun	就是闹着玩	Cai Baoqiang	
2015	Jian Bing Man	煎饼侠	Himself	guest
2016	I Belonged to You	从你的全世界路过	Zhutou	
2016	Our Happiness	相声大电影之我要幸福	Yue Qiangnan	
2017	Buddies in India	大闹天竺	Zhu Tianpeng	
2017	Revenge for Love	疯岳撬佳人	Li Shuaiting	
2017	Goldbuster	妖铃铃	Xu Tianyu	
2017	Top Funny Comedian: The Movie	欢乐喜剧人	Himself	
2017	What a Wonderful Family!	麻烦家族	The doctor	guest
2017	City of Rock	缝纫机乐队	Qiao Dashan	
2018	Mad Ebriety	断片之险途夺宝	Ah Le	
2018	The Faces of My Gene	祖宗十九代	Bei Xiaobei	
2018	Happiness Is Coming	幸福马上来	Security Guard	guest
2018	Airpocalypse	天气预爆	Peter	
2019	Coward Hero	鼠胆英雄	Yan Dahai	
2020	My People, My Homeland	我和我的家乡	Yue Longgang	
2020	A Little Red Flower	送你一朵小红花	Wu Xiaomei	
2023	Full River Red	满江红	Wu Yichun	
2023	One and Only	热烈		
2023	If You are the One 3	非诚勿扰3	Lao Fan	

=== TV series ===
Year	English title	Chinese title	Role	Notes
2010	The Magistrate Ye Guangming	知县叶光明	The policeman	
2016	What's Your Number	先生你哪位	Li Zuo	
2016	Deep Well Cantenn	深井食堂	Gu De	
2019	My Father & Daddy	我的亲爹和后爸		Guest

=== Variety shows ===
Year	Title	Chinese title	Role	Notes
2023	Natural High	现在就出发	Recurring member	

== Single ==
Release date	English title	Chinese title	Notes
2015	Song of the Fifth Ring Road	五环之歌	feat. MC HotDog

== Film and TV Awards ==
Year	Nominated work	Award	Category	Result	Notes
2017	Top Funny Comedian: The Movie	9th Macau International Movie Festival	Best Supporting Actor	Nominated	
