= So I Married an Anti-fan =

So I Married an Anti-fan may refer to:

- So I Married an Anti-fan (novel), a South Korean novel by Kim Eun-jung
- So I Married the Anti-fan, a South Korean television series, based on the novel
- So I Married an Anti-fan (film), a Chinese film, based on the novel
