= Coward Hero =

- Traditional Chinese: 鼠膽英雄
- Simplified Chinese: 鼠胆英雄
- Hanyu Pinyin: Shǔdǎn Yīngxióng
- Directed by: Shu Huan; Shao Dan
- Written by: Shu Huan
- Produced by: Hu Suhan; Wang Ning; Liang Xidong
- Starring: Yue Yunpeng; Tong Liya
- Production companies: Dade Film Company; Suobao Film Company; Kuake Media
- Release date: 2 August 2019 (China)
- Running time: 106 minutes
- Country: China
- Language: Mandarin

Coward Hero (Chinese: 鼠胆英雄) is a 2019 Chinese comedy film directed by Shu Huan and Shao Dan and stars Yue Yunpeng and Tong Liya. The film premiered in China on August 2, 2019.

== Cast ==
- Yue Yunpeng as Yan Dahai
- Tong Liya as Du Qing
- Yuan Hong as Xing Tiecheng
- Tian Yu as Zhao Hanqing
- Han Tongsheng as Zhou Jidao
- Liu Wei as Master Xuan
- Dong Chengpeng as the Gun god
- Lei Jiayin as the second chief of Qinglong Gang

== Production ==
Shu Huan has said he had spent 5 years developing the film.

== Release ==
The film premiered at Shanghai International Film Festival on June 16, 2019, and opened in China on August 2, 2019.

== Reception ==
Douban, a major Chinese media rating site, gave the drama 5.6 out of 10.
