= So I Married the Anti-fan =

2021 South Korean television series

- Promotional poster
- Hangul: 그래서 나는 안티팬과 결혼했다
- RR: Geuraeseo naneun antipaengwa gyeolhonhaetda
- MR: Kŭraesŏ nanŭn ant'ip'aen'gwa kyŏrhonhaetta
- Genre: Romantic comedy
- Based on: So I Married an Anti-fan by Kim Eun-jung
- Written by: Kim Eun-jung; Nam Ji-yeon
- Directed by: Kang Cheol-woo
- Starring: Choi Tae-joon; Choi Soo-young; Hwang Chan-sung; Han Ji-an; Kim Min-kyu
- Country of origin: South Korea
- Original language: Korean
- No. of episodes: 16

Production
- Executive producer: Jeon Joo-ye
- Producers: Keum Kyung-ok; Kang Sung-wook
- Camera setup: Single-camera
- Running time: 60 minutes
- Production companies: Godin Media; Warner Bros. Television

Original release
- Network: Naver TV
- Release: April 30 – June 19, 2021

So I Married the Anti-fan (Korean: 그래서 나는 안티팬과 결혼했다) is a 2021 South Korean streaming television series starring Choi Tae-joon, Choi Soo-young, Hwang Chan-sung, Han Ji-an and Kim Min-kyu. It is based on the 2010 novel of the same title which was made into a webtoon and was also previously adapted into a Chinese film. It aired from April 30 to June 19, 2021 on Naver TV, with simultaneous broadcast through V Live and global platforms iQIYI, Viki and Amazon Prime Video in Japan.

== Synopsis ==
Hoo Joon (Choi Tae-joon) is a top South Korean singer. Lee Geun-young (Choi Soo-young) is a magazine reporter. The two both attend a club's opening night. While there, Geun-young witnesses Joon's bad behavior and accidentally vomits on him. She loses her job and is convinced that Joon is behind her being fired. She demonstrates in front of Joon's management office, where she garners media attention and becomes his "anti-fan."

A producer approaches her (and Joon) about participating in a reality TV show about a star living with his anti-fan. When filming begins, Joon and Geun-young have a rocky relationship that evolves as they get to know each other better.

== Cast ==
=== Main ===
- Choi Tae-joon as Hoo Joon, a world-famous superstar. Unlike his cold-hearted demeanor, he is a pure person who carries the pain of his first love.
- Choi Soo-young as Lee Geun-young, a magazine reporter who becomes Joon's "No.1 Anti-fan" after she thinks her life is ruined because of him.
- Hwang Chan-sung as JJ/Choi Jae-joon, a chaebol and the CEO of an entertainment agency.
- Han Ji-an as Oh In-hyung, a rising singer.
- Kim Min-kyu as Go Soo-hwan, Geun-young's friend who is a photographer.

=== Supporting ===
- Kim Sun-hyuk as Seo Ji-hyang, Joon's manager who takes care of him like a real younger brother.
- Kim Ha-kyung as Shin Mi-jung, Geun-young's best friend since elementary school.
- Dong Hyun-bae as Han Jae-won, a television show producer.
- Im Do-yoon as Noh Do-yoon
- Baek Seung-heon as Shin-hyung, Mi-jung's long time boyfriend.
- Ji Ho-sung as Kang Ji-hyuk, Joon's junior who believes and follows him like his own brother.
- Kim Hyung-min as Roy Ahn, Geun-young's ex-boyfriend who is a chef.
- Kim Min-kyo as the CEO of Joon's agency, Shooting Star.
- Yoo Seo-jin as Moon-hee, the editor-in-chief of Geun-young's company.
- Song Chae-yoon as Cha Yu-ri, Joon's biggest fan in his fan club.
- Park Dong-bin as Jo Hae-yoon

=== Special appearances ===
- Song Ji-eun as a flight attendant
- Sung Hoon as Choi Jae-hee, JJ's older brother.
- Jeon So-min as Kim Da-hyun (Ep. 11)

== Production and release ==
So I Married the Anti-fan is a pre-produced series. The first script reading of the cast was held on August 20, 2018, and filming began the same month.

The release of the series was delayed for three years due to difficulties in finding a television network to broadcast it. Adding to that, the two male leads, Choi Tae-joon and Hwang Chan-sung, started their military service not long after it had finished filming, so there were potential difficulties in promotional activities without them.
