= Zhang Qiang =

Zhang Qiang may refer to:

- Zhang Qiang (singer) (Chinese: 张蔷; pinyin: Zhāng Qiáng, born 1967), Chinese singer
- Zhang Qiang (curler) (Chinese: 张强; pinyin: Zhāng Qiáng, born 1979), Chinese wheelchair curler
- Zhang Qiang (badminton), Chinese badminton player
