= Sun Jialu =

Chinese actress (born 1996)

- 孙嘉璐
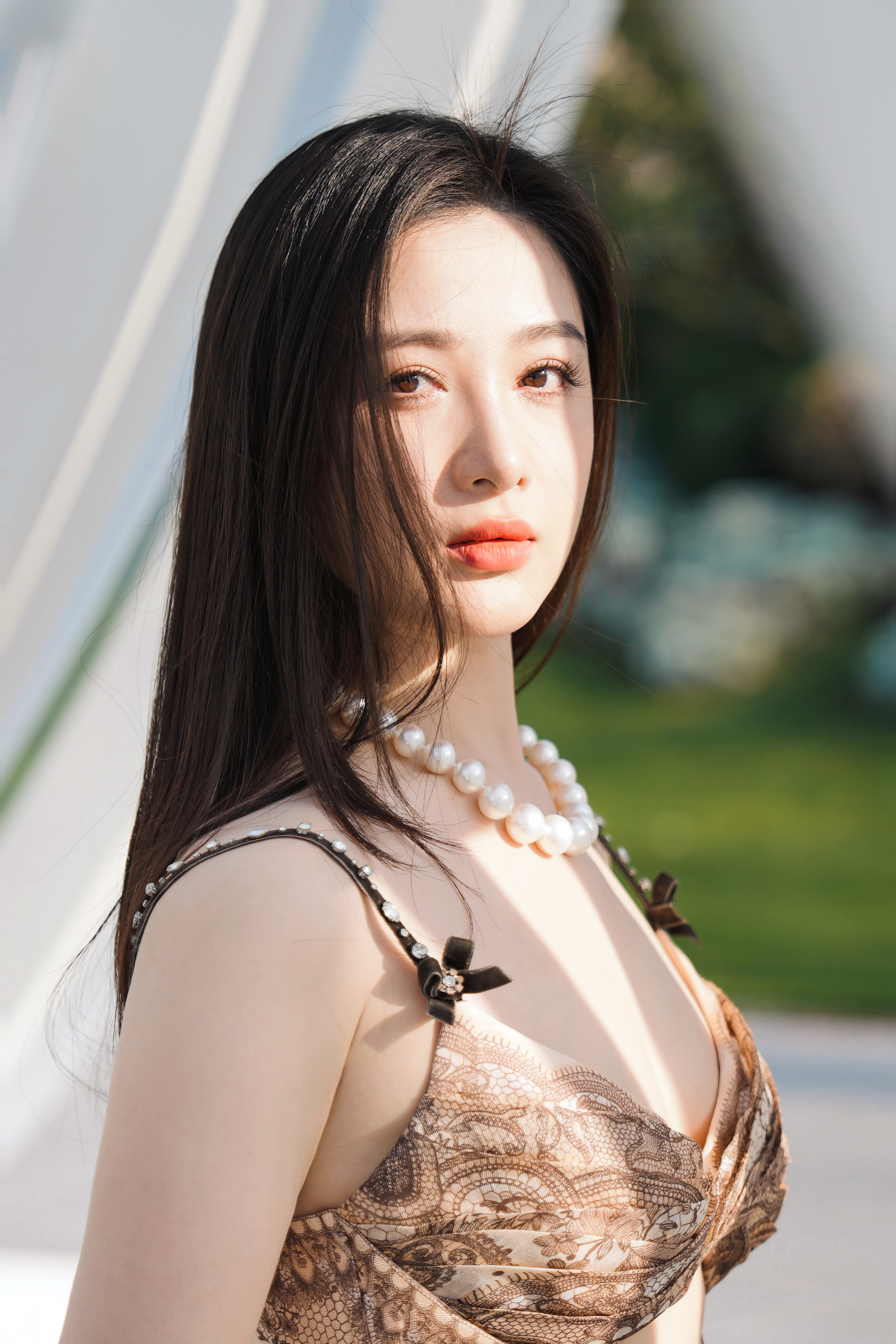
- Sun in 2025
- Born: September 19, 1996 (age 30); China Shandong Province，Yantai
- Other names: Luby, Lulu
- Education: master
- Occupation: actress
- Years active: 2014+
- Website: weibo.com/u/2742586765

Sun Jialu (Chinese: 孫嘉璐; born 19 September 1996), is a Chinese actress and producer.She is best known for her roles in the romance drama First Romance on the Line (2018), the costume series Ni Chang (2020), and the film Bloodbath on Mount Huaiyu (2024).and she attended the 79th Cannes Film Festival(2026).She also attended Paris Fashion Week in 2026.

== Early life and education ==
Sun was born on 19 September 1996 in Yantai, Shandong, China. She graduated from the Performance Department of the Beijing Film Academy in 2012, and in 2022 she began full-time graduate studies in Chinese Language and Literature at Hong Kong Baptist University. She completed her program in December 2023. In January 2025, she was accepted into a postdoctoral development program at Homerton College, University of Cambridge.

== Career ==
In 2015, Sun made her acting debut in the historical drama Blood Rebirth, co-starring Qiao Zhenyu, Lee Siu-hin, and Shen Junyi. Later that year, she starred in Unmarried Dad and the rural youth comedy The Village Official.

In 2016, she played leading roles in the romance drama Love Returns and the spy drama The Lonely War.She also starred in the family drama The Closest and Dearest.

In 2018, Sun gained recognition with her leading role in the romantic series First Romance on the Line. The same year, she starred in the fantasy film The Painter 2.

In 2020, she appeared in the CCTV prime-time drama Not One Less, followed by a starring role in the costume drama Ni Chang.

In 2022, she starred in the web drama Letters from the Battlefield, portraying Bai Ruping.

In 2024, Sun won the "Most Promising Actress Award" at the 4th Asian International Youth Film Festival for her role in the film Bloodbath on Mount Huaiyu. She also participated in the fifth season of the variety show Supernova Games, winning first place in the women's 15m archery competition with a record score. In December 2024, she began filming the feature film Waves Bloom as a lead actress.

In July 2025, Sun starred alongside Yuan Shanshan in the suspense film Mystery of Ailao Mountain directed by Ma Kai. In May 2026, Sun Jialu attended the 79th Cannes Film Festival as an actress.

== Fashion ==
In March 2025, Sun appeared at China Fashion Week in Beijing, showcasing haute couture aesthetics through her dual presence as both actress and fashion guest.In October 2026, Sun Jialu attended Paris Fashion Week for the first time.

== Filmography ==
=== Television dramas ===
year	drama
2015	Blood Rebirth as Huang Yijia
2015	Unmarried Dad as Li Shanshan
2015	The Village Official as Mei Hua
2016	Love Returns as Gao Minghui
2016	The Closest and Dearest as Lu Jing'er
2018	First Romance on the Line as Lu Xinyi
2020	Not One Less as Ding Xiang
2022	Letters from the Battlefield as Bai Ruping

=== Films ===
- 2024 – Bloodbath on Mount Huaiyu as Liao Yuhua
- 2024 – Waves Bloom
- 2025 – Mystery of Ailao Mountain

=== Variety shows ===
- 2021 – Supernova Games Season 4 (women's archery preliminary, first place)
- 2024 – Supernova Games Season 5 (women's 15m archery, champion)

== Awards ==
- 2024 – Most Promising Actress Award, 4th Asian International Youth Film Festival
- 2024 – Outstanding Actress Award, 5th Thai Sun International Film Festival
