= Sisters Who Make Waves season 3 =

Sisters Who Make Waves
- Season 3
- Native name
- Traditional Chinese: 乘風破浪3
- Simplified Chinese: 乘风破浪3
- Literal meaning: Sisters who break waves
- Hanyu Pinyin: Chéngfēngpòlàng 3
- Presented by: Xie Na
- No. of contestants: 30
- Winners: Cyndi Wang; Jessica Jung; Kelly Yu; Sitar Tan; Gillian Chung; Fiona Sit; Charlene Choi; Tang Shiyi; Amber Kuo; Crystal Zhang

Release
- Original network: Mango TV
- Original release: May 20 – August 5, 2022

Season chronology
- ← Previous; Season 2 Next → Season 4

Sisters Who Make Waves (Season 3) (Chinese: 乘风破浪3; pinyin: Chéngfēngpòlàng 3) is the third season of Sisters Who Make Waves which premiered on May 20, 2022, on Mango TV. This season featured 30 celebrities aged over 30 who compete to form a girl group. The winner of season one, Ning Jing, and the winner of season two, Na Ying, returned to the show as team captains to lead and perform alongside the 30 contestants.

== Concept ==
Following the success of the first and second seasons, Mango TV presented the third season of the show just over a year after the end of season 2. The general concept of the show remains the same as the previous seasons. However, slight changes were made to the competition and performance formats.

== Contestants ==
Each contestant's English name will be used if known. Otherwise, the pinyin version of the name would be used in the order of surname followed by given name. All names in parentheses are in simplified Chinese. All ages and years are at the time of the competition.

List of Contestants
Name (Chinese name)	Occupation	Birth Place	Age	Year of Debut	Results
Cyndi Wang (王心凌)	Singer	Taiwan	39	2003	Debuted (1st place)
Jessica Jung (郑秀妍)	Singer	United States	33	2007	Debuted (2nd place)
Kelly Yu (于文文)	Singer	Liaoning	32	2012	Debuted (3rd place)
Sitar Tan 谭维维)	Singer	Sichuan	39	2005	Debuted (4th place)
Gillian Chung (钟欣潼)	Singer	Hong Kong	41	1999	Debuted (5th place)
Fiona Sit (薛凯琪)	Singer	Hong Kong	40	2003	Debuted (6th place)
Charlene Choi (蔡卓妍)	Singer	Canada	39	1999	Debuted (7th place)
Tang Shiyi (唐诗逸)	Professional Dancer	Hunan	31	2007	Debuted (8th place)
Amber Kuo 郭采洁)	Actress	Taiwan	36	2007	Debuted (9th place)
Crystal Zhang (张天爱)	Actress	Heilongjiang	33	2006	Debuted (10th place)
Wu Jinyan (吴谨言)	Actress	Sichuan	31	2012	Finalist (11th place)
Rose Zhang (张蔷)	Singer	Beijing	54	1984	Finalist (12th place)
Kelsey Zhao (赵梦)	Singer	Shandong	35	2013	Finalist (13th place)
Zhu Jiejing (朱洁静)	Professional Dancer	Zhejiang	36	2000	Finalist (14th place)
Wang Zixuan (王紫璇)	Actress	Sichuan	30	2015	Finalist (15th place)
Zhang Li (张俪)	Actress	Guangxi	37	2007	Finalist (16th place)
Qi Xi (齐溪)	Actress	Guizhou	35	2006	Finalist (17th place)
Zhang Xinyi (张歆艺)	Actress	Sichuan	41	2005	Eliminated after fifth performance
Mao Junjie (毛俊杰)	Actress	Shandong	38	2007	Eliminated after fourth performance
Valen Hsu (许茹芸)	Singer	Taiwan	47	1995	Eliminated after fourth performance
Myolie Wu (胡杏儿)	Actress	Hong Kong	42	1999	Eliminated after fourth performance
Xu Mengtao (徐梦桃)	Professional Freestyle Skier	Liaoning	31	1995	Withdrew from competition
Liu Lian (刘恋)	Singer	Sichuan	32	2009	Eliminated after third performance
Huang Yi (黄奕)	Actress	Shanghai	42	1998	Eliminated after third performance
Aya Liu (柳翰雅)	TV Host	Taiwan	43	1996	Eliminated after third performance
Zhao Yingzi (赵樱子)	Actress	Shandong	31	2008	Eliminated after second performance
Momo Wu (吴莫愁)	Singer	Heilongjiang	30	2014	Eliminated after first performance
Huang Xiaolei (黄小蕾)	Actress	Chongqing	41	2001	Eliminated after first performance
Natasha Na (那英)	Singer	Liaoning	53	1988	Team Captain, Season 2 Winner
Ning Jing (宁静)	Actress	Guizhou	50	1990	Team Captain, Season 1 Winner

== Episodes ==
=== Episode 1 (May 20, 2022) ===
In the first episode, each of the 30 contestants self selected between wanting become a group leader (group leader contestant) and wanting to become a group member (group member contestant). All contestants and the two team captains performed a personal preliminary stage. The preliminary stage performances took place in two rounds, starting with the group leader contestants followed by the group member contestants.

In Round 1, the group leader contestants decided between themselves the order of performance. After each group leader contestant's performance, each group member contestant and the two team captains could raise their hands to vote for the performer to become a group leader. However, each contestant can only vote for one person. The three performers in Round 1 with the most votes became group leaders for the first public performance.

In Round 2, the group member contestants decided between themselves the order of performance. After all performances were complete, each group member contestant and the two team captains wrote down the names of three contestants who they would like to see as group captains. The three performers in Round 2 with the most votes became group leaders for the first public performance.

After the six group leaders have been decided, team captains must pair with three group leaders each to form their team. First, the two team captains were paired with one group leader each. To do this, each team captain wrote down the name of one group leader who they would want to have on their team, and each group leader wrote down the name of one team captain who they would like to work with. If the names on the team captain and group leader's card corresponds with each other, the pairing is a success. For the rest of the group leaders, the team captains and group leaders discussed between themselves how to split into the two teams.

==== Results ====
Displayed in order of performance.

Round 1: Group Leader Candidates
Contestant	Vocal Song	Dance Song			
Contestant	Vocal Song	Dance Song	Momo Wu(吴莫愁)	《破》	15 Votes (Group Leader)
Kelsey Zhao (赵梦)	《放开自己》	7 Votes (Group Leader)			
Mao Junjie (毛俊杰)	《沧海一声笑》	1 Vote (Group Member)			
Tang Shiyi (唐诗逸)	《一生所爱》	0 Votes (Group Member)			
Kelly Yu(于文文)	《黑色柳丁》	2 Votes (Group Leader)			

Round 2: Group Member Candidates
Contestant	Vocal Song	Dance Song			
Contestant	Vocal Song	Dance Song	Huang Xiaolei(黄小蕾)	《给姐姐扎起》	6 Votes (Group Member)
Zhang Xinyi(张歆艺)	《再回首》	5 Votes (Group Member)			
Aya Liu(柳翰雅)	《壁花进行曲》	12 Votes (Group Leader)			
Sitar Tan(谭维维)	《但求疼》	16 Votes (Group Leader)			
Zhu Jiejing(朱洁静)	《月光》	0 Votes (Group Member)			
Huang Yi(黄奕)	《Who is Back》	0 Votes (Group Member)			
Crystal Zhang(张天爱)	《神魂颠倒》	0 Votes (Group Member)			
Zhang Li(张俪)	《燕尾蝶》	0 Votes (Group Member)			
Zhao Yingzi(赵樱子)	《后来》	0 Votes (Group Member)			
Fiona Sit(薛凯琪)	《今生今世》	0 Vote (Group Member)			
Xu Mengtao(徐梦桃)	《那些你很冒险的梦》	1 Vote (Group Member)			
Wang Zixuan(王紫璇)	《爱人错过》	1 Vote (Group Member)			
Amber Kuo(郭采洁)	《我有一颗苹果》	4 Votes (Group Member)			
Qi Xi(齐溪)	《纵乐园》	2 Votes (Group Member)			
Wu Jinyan(吴谨言)	《雪落下的声音》	1 Vote (Group Member)			
Jessica Jung(郑秀妍)	《Perfect》 《失落沙洲》	3 Votes (Group Member)			
Myolie Wu(胡杏儿)	《岁月如歌》	2 Votes (Group Member)			
Cyndi Wang(王心凌)	《爱你》	2 Votes (Group Member)			
Gillian Chung(钟欣潼)	《天外来物》	1 Vote (Group Member)			
Charlene Choi(蔡卓妍)	《小酒窝》	1 Vote (Group Member)			
Valen Hsu(许茹芸)	《现在该怎么好》	5 Votes (Group Member)			
Liu Lian(刘恋)	《在你的婚礼我多喝了两杯》	8 Votes (Group Leader)			
Rose Zhang(张蔷)	《630 Affection in your eyes》	5 Votes (Group Member)			
Ning Jing(宁静)	《无地自容》	Team Captain Performance			
Natasha Na(那英)	《守候》	Team Captain Performance			

Group Leader and Team Captain Pairings

For the first round of pairings, Aya Liu joined team Ning Jing and Sitar Tan joined team Natasha Na. During the discussion round, Kelsey Zhao and Kelly Yu joined team Ning Jing and Liu Lian and Momo Wu joined team Natasha Na.

In the first performance, 30 members either join Ning Jing's league or Nay Ying's league. The Winning league has all its members advance to the next round not taking into account of personal preference ranking. The losing league has the last two members of its team in the personal preference ranking eliminated. In each round the audience has 60 seconds to cast their votes on one of the two performances. Whichever league's performance receives more votes wins.

First Round

谈笑一生: 427 votes Members: Momo Wu, Huang Xiao Lei, Cyndi Wang, Wu Jin Yan (Lost)

要你管: 562 votes Members: Aya Liu, Mao Jun Jie, Charlene Choi, Jessica Jung (Win)

Second Round

你不要但心: 551 votes Members: Sitar Tan, Huang Yi, Zhang Xin Yi, Myolie Wu (Win)

野长辉: 439 votes Members: Kelly Yu, Cici Wang, Zhang Li, Rose Zhang (Lost)

Third Round

只己: 521 votes Members: Kelsey Zhao, Amber Kuo, Fiona Sit, Crystal Zhang (Win)

雾里: 474 votes Members: Liu Lian, Tang Shi Yi, Qi Xi, Zhu Jie Jing (Lost)

Fourth Round

A silent flower is blossoming: 892 votes Members: Na Ying, Valen Hsu, Xu Meng Tao (Win)

情书: 873 votes Members: Ning Jing, Gillian Cheung, Zhao Ying Zhi (Lost)

Total votes of the leagues

Ning Jing: 2395 votes

Na Ying: 2344 votes

Because Ning Jing's league won, all of the members entered safe status while Momo Wu and Huang Xiao Lei were eliminated from Na Ying's team

== Impact ==
Cyndi Wang's performance of her classic song "Love You" during the first stage instantly became popular throughout China, setting off a wave of memories from mostly middle aged men who listened to the original version of the song when they were young. Following the airing of the first episode, netizens began uploading covers of the performance and led to the "Cyndi Boy" craze. Cyndi's sudden popularity from the show led many of her songs to make top charts in many Chinese music streaming services.
