= I Belonged to You =

- Poster
- Chinese: 从你的全世界路过
- Directed by: Zhang Yibai
- Written by: Zhang Jiajia
- Based on: Passing From Your World by Zhang Jiajia
- Produced by: Wei Xiaolei; Shan Liang; Tian Tian
- Starring: Deng Chao; Bai Baihe; Yang Yang; Zhang Tianai; Yue Yunpeng; Du Juan; Liu Yan
- Production companies: Beijing Enlight Pictures; Tianjin Motie Entertainment; Tianjin Chengzi Yingxiang Media; Tianjin Motie Xingya Media; Huoerguosi Enlight Media; Orange Image; Shanghai Shigu Film; Nanjing Shijianhai Entertainment
- Distributed by: Beijing Enlight Pictures; Shanghai Tao Piao Piao Entertainment
- Release date: 29 September 2016 (China)
- Running time: 113 minutes
- Country: China
- Language: Mandarin
- Box office: US$121.5 million

I Belonged to You is a 2016 Chinese romantic drama film directed by Zhang Yibai and starring Deng Chao, Bai Baihe, Yang Yang, Zhang Tianai, Yue Yun-peng, Du Juan and Liu Yan. It was released in China on September 29, 2016.

== Plot ==
I Belonged to You is a romance omnibus of mini love stories adapted from Zhang Jiajia's best-selling internet "bedtime stories" novel of the same name. Chen Mo (Deng Chao), is known as the cheapest person in the whole city. Every day he will battle against DJ Xiao Rong (Du Juan). No one knows where their hate comes from. Chen Mo's two little brothers, whether it is the silliest Zhu Tou (Yue Yun Peng) or the city's most innocent Mo Shi Ba (Yang Yang), the three people all go on rampages daily, thinking that they can all live freely, but the result is that they all hit the greatest turning point of their lives. Chen Mo meets the mysterious Yao Ji (Zhang Tianai), Zhu Tou creates the worst wedding of all time, Mo Shi Ba experiences the saddest parting. These people's lives reveal things little by little. Dreams, love, friendship all go far away. They have already lost their own paths, until they hear a voice from around the world.

== Cast ==
- Deng Chao as Chen Mo 陈末
- Bai Baihe as Li Zhi 荔枝
- Yang Yang as Mao Shiba 茅十八
- Zhang Tianai as Yao Ji 幺鸡
- Yue Yunpeng as Zhu Tou 猪头
- Du Juan as Xiao Rong 小容
- Liu Yan as Yan Zi 燕子

== Reception ==
In China, I Belonged to You was strategically released on Thursday, October 1, National Day – traditionally a day for families to go and watch firework displays. The release date indeed proved to be lucrative as the film opened in first place from its opening day with $11.1 million (dominating 80% of the total market share) and throughout the remaining four days, leading to top the charts by the end of the weekend. In total, it earned $45.9 million in the four day period and $34.4 million in the Friday to Sunday period, according to data from Ent Group. Although the film topped the box office in its country, internationally, it fell behind the Hollywood film, Miss Peregrine's Home for Peculiar Children.

In its second weekend, the film fell to second place earning $12.5 million over the weekend. It was overtaken by Operation Mekong.

== Awards and nominations ==
Year	Award	Category	Recipient	Result	Ref.
2017	30th Tokyo International Film Festival Golden Crane Award	Best Film	I Belonged to You	Won	

== See also ==
- See You Tomorrow
