= Kelly Yu =

Chinese Canadian singer and actress (born 1989)

- 于文文
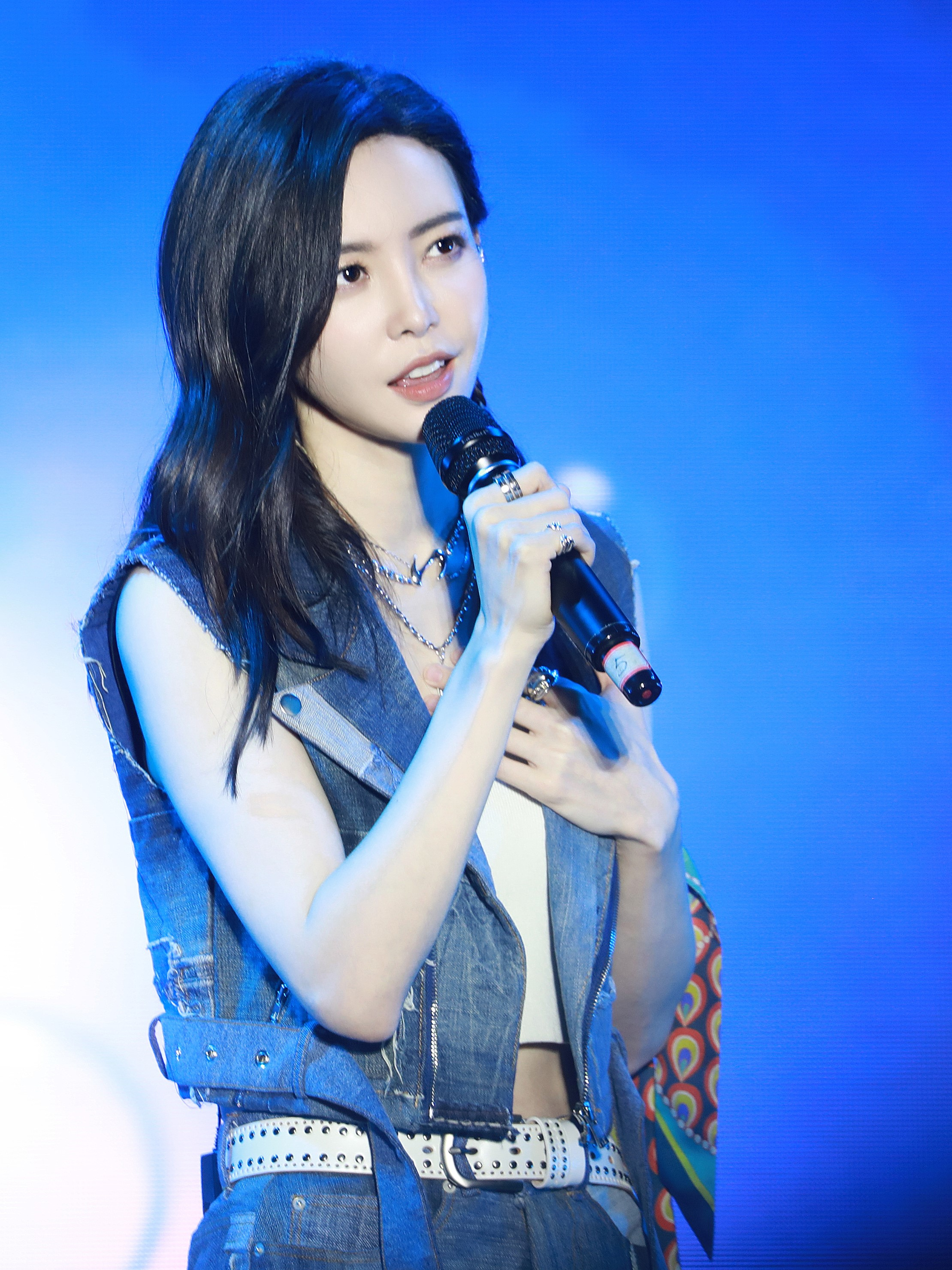
- Kelly Yu performing at a music festival in August 2022
- Born: 7 November 1989 (age 36); Dalian, Liaoning, China
- Education: Berklee College of Music
- Occupations: Musician; singer; songwriter; composer; actress
- Years active: 2014–present
- Height: 168 cm (5 ft 6 in)
- Musical career
- Also known as: Yu Wenwen
- Origin: China
- Genres: Rock; C-pop; R&B
- Instruments: Vocals; guitar; keyboards; piano; bass; drums
- Labels: Warner Music China; Kelly Yu Studio; Sony Music Taiwan

Chinese name
- Chinese: 于文文
Transcriptions
Standard Mandarin
- Hanyu Pinyin: Yú Wénwén
- Website: Kelly Yu on Weibo (in Chinese) Kelly Yu on Instagram; Kelly Yu on Facebook; Kelly Yu's channel on YouTube Kelly Yu on X

Kelly Yu Wenwen (Chinese: 于文文; pinyin: Yú Wénwén; born 7 November 1989) is a Chinese-Canadian singer, songwriter, actress, music producer and director. She is famous for starring in the romantic film The Ex-File 3: The Return of the Exes and for singing and composing the film song OST "Decency" (Chinese: 体面; pinyin: Tǐmiàn).

== Personal life ==
Kelly was born in Dalian, China and moved with her parents to Vancouver, British Columbia, in 2004. She attended Killarney Secondary School and later moved to Boston, where she attended the Berklee College of Music. She majored in music, performance, Music Composition and studied acting.

== Career ==
At the age of 17, she released her first self-made album "Evil Child" with her band. In 2010, she served as a guitarist for Ku Youlun's band. In 2011, she went to Beijing Film Academy to study performance. In 2012, she made a cameo appearance in the film "To Our Dying Youth" directed by Zhao Wei. In the same year, she acted as the heroine of the movie "Let It Rain" and released the EP album "Let It Rain".

Yu's first movie was Under the Rain in 2012, directed by Liu Chen. Her first lead role was in 2014 in the television series One and a Half Summer co-produced by China and South Korea and pairing up with Nichkhun. In the same year (2014), Yu released her first album "Fighting Spirit".

She has collaborated with 윤종신 (Yoon Jong Shin) for 왠지 그럼 안될 것 같아 (Somehow I don't think so) in 2014. South Korean media reported that Yu became the first artist in the global project of Mystic89, led by South Korean singer-songwriter and artist Yoon Jong- shin. In the same year, she participated in the Beijing Satellite TV "The Most Beautiful Harmony" competition and entered the finals. In November of the same year, Taiwan released the album "Fighting Spirit". On 13 December of the same year, the first individual ticketed Kelly Show album concert was held on the bank of the Taipei Mansion.

In 2016, she participated in the third season of "Song of China" and was successfully selected with a song "Heartbeat". She became the top six student of Yuquan team. In the same year, she became the world's first female spokesperson for "Ibanez" and owned an electric guitar exclusively customized by the manufacturer. In April of the same year, she became one of the singers in the music season broadcast program "Avenue of Stars Super Edition" of CCTV Variety Channel.

In 2017, Yu starred as the lead actress in the romantic film The Ex-File 3: The Return of the Exes. She sang the theme song of the film called "Ti Mian". The song was downloaded over more than 60 million in Spotify. The theme song for the rom-com feature film The Ex-File 3: The Return of the Exes was #3 at iTunes Taiwan, and a YouTube audio file has attracted 65 million "views".

After "Predecessor 3", she released two new albums and sang a lot of film and television OSTs, such as the drama versions of "July and Ansheng" and "I". She sang for episodes, theme songs, and opening and ending songs such as "My True Friend", "Storm Dance" and "Illusory City". She also participated in a lot of music shows, such as "Infinite Ballad Season", "Voice of God", "Let's Band Together", "Masked Singer", "You Music List", "Longing For Life", "The Perfect Travel of Girlfriends" and so on.

In 2018, Yu released her self-composed full-length second album titled "Undefined" followed by her third self-composed album Intermezzo in 2020, it ranked first on TME Physical Album Sales Chart's June 2022 chart.

In 2022, Yu joined Sisters Who Make Waves Season 3 as a contestant and won as the 3rd winner. 5 August 2022, in Riding the Wind and Waves (Season 3) she has successfully formed a group after winning the 3rd place. On the same day, she released her first singing and dancing single "Hedgehog".

This is followed with a variety show called The Seaside Band 乐队的海边 on 11 November 2022. In 2022, she starred in a Hollywood film Moonfall. It is a 2022 American post-apocalyptic science fiction disaster film co-written, directed, and produced by Roland Emmerich. She also sang the film's promotional song of the same name.

On Christmas Day of 2022, Yu announced via Weibo that she will be reprising her role as Lin Jia from Ex-File 3 with other key members returning too. The Ex-file 4 was a success with 1 billion box office in the year 2023.

In 2023, Yu released her fourth studio album called "It's Me" on 31 March. It ranked first on that month's TME Physical Album Sales Chart. In July 2023, Yu started her world tour concert (Kelly Yu 3x3/World Tour 2023) in Beijing on 29 July 2023. In November 2023, two days after her birthday, she released a song call "Drowning" which was written, sung and composed by her. She became the director for the MV as well.

== Filmography ==
=== Film ===
Year	English title	Chinese title	Role	Notes
2012	Under the Rain	雨下吧	Yu Wenwen	
2013	So Young	致我们终将逝去的青春		Cameo
2016	The Secret	消失的愛人	Bo Bo	
2017	Young Pea	青春逗	Jiang Wanqing	
2017	The Ex-File 3: The Return of the Exes	前任3:再见前任	Lin Jia	
2018	Twenty	二十岁	Xie Wenyi	
2019	Chasing Dream	我的拳王男友		Guest appearance
2021	Between Us	我没谈完的那场恋爱	Lin Shan Ni	
2022	Moonfall	月球陨落	Michelle	
2022	Back to Earth	重回地球	Chang E	
TBA	Be Careful When Reversing	倒车请注意		
2024	China Top Arms: Mission Top Secret	中国兵王之绝密任务	Chen Zijing	
TBA	Ex: Fall in Love Again	复合吧！前任	Chen Xingxing	Previous movie name was 'Fighting! Dude' (奋斗吧，青年)
2023	The Ex-File 4	前任4:英年早婚	Lin Jia	Reprising the main actress role from Ex-File 3

=== Drama series ===
Year	English title	Chinese title	Role	Notes
2014	One and a Half Summer	一又二分之一的夏天	Shu Qing	
2019	Beijing Subway	北京地铁	Yao Tianlu	
2021	Lost Promise	胭脂债	Bo Ye Jingxing	
2022	The Disappearing Child	消失的孩子	Lin Chuping	
2023	Hi Producer	正好遇见你	Yin Ping Ping	

=== Television shows ===
Year	Title	Role	Notes	Ref.
2021	Never say Never	Regular Member		
2021	Action!	Regular Member		
2021	Flash Cafe	Guest	Ep 17	
2022	Sisters Who Make Waves Season 3	Contestant	Chinese survival reality show that determined X-Sister members Finished 3rd	
2022	The Seaside Band 乐队的海边	Lead	Reality cooking show with live house performances	
2022	Hello Saturday 你好,星期六	Guest		
2022	Rock & Roast Season 5	Guest	Ep 4	
2022	The Mews	Guest	Ep 3	
2022	Masked Dancing King Season 3	Guest	Ep 8	
2023	Friends Together	Guest		
2023	WOW! CLUB	Guest	Ep 2	
2023	Infinity and Beyond	Guest	Ep 4–7	
2023	It Sound Incredible Season 3	Guest	Ep4	
2023	The Treasured Voice Season 4	Regular Member	Ep 1–4	
2023	Ring a Bell	Guest	Ep10	
2023	Time Concert Season 3	Regular Member		
2023	Wo Men Di Mei Hao Sheng Huo / Our Wonderful Life	Guest	Ep 5	

== Discography ==
=== Albums ===
Album information	Track listing
Lost In Translation: Released: 31 December 2007	Track listing: 1. Nocturne; 2. Where Were You; 3. Friday Night In San Francisco
Urban Pie: Released: 31 December 2008	Track listing: 1. Killing From Above; 2. Fly Away
Under the Rain (雨下吧): Extended play; Released: 21 November 2012; Label: 紫金山唱片	Track listing: 1. 雨下吧（電影《雨下吧》主題曲）; 2. 吶喊（原名:釣魚島）; 3. 愛我的人（《如果我愛你》電視劇插曲）
Spirits (斗志): Studio Album; Released: 7 November 2014; Label: Sony Music Entertainment Taiwan Ltd	Track listing: 1. Want You Back; 2. 谢谢你爱我; 3. 斗志; 4. 悄悄话; 5. 分手那天; 6. 爱我的人; 7. 女孩爱上电吉他; 8. 为你而唱; 9. 请原谅; 10. Always Be The Same For You
Write a Night of Heartbeat (写一夜心跳): Studio album; Released: 11 April 2016; Label: Juicy Music	Track listing: 1. 我只想寫一首好歌曲 - I Just want to write a good song 2. 一夜成長 - Grow Overnight; 3. 心跳 - Heartbeat
Undefined (尚未界定): Studio album; Released: 6 November 2018; Label: Juicy Music	Track listing: 1. 偷不走的現在; 2. 深度對話; 3. 其實其實; 4. 過去; 5. Save Me; 6. 傷患; 7. 奉陪; 8. 體面 - Decency; 9. 交換手機; 10. 你是我的
Intermezzo (于文文/幕间剧): Studio album; Released: 16 September 2021; Label: Warner Music China	Track listing: 1. 白衣少年 - Boy in White; 2. 試探 - Testing Game; 3. You Are; 4. 餘地 - Leeway; 5. 浪花 - Summer Waves; 6. 配合 - Match Up; 7. 要不要 - Wonder Or Not; 8. 門前雪 - The Last Snow; 9. Already Gone; 10. 盲聽 - Hear The Future
It's Me (是我): Studio album; Released: 31 March 2023; Label: Warner Music China	Track listing: 1. Intro; 2. 是我 - It's Me; 3. 你好 - Hello!; 4. 过來人 - Passenger; 5. 刺蝟 - Hedgehog; 6. 小心 - Be Careful; 7. Beautiful; 8. 顽固天真 - Still Be Naive; 9. 影子 - Shadow; 10. Nothing Can Stop Me Now
Scorpio (天蠍座): Studio album; Released: 7 November 2024; Label: YWWStudio & Sony Music	Track listing: 1. 已读不回 – Left on Read; 2. 狼人 - Werewolf; 3. 原罪 - Original Sin; 4. 可惜 - Unfortunately; 5. 夕阳向晚 - Drowning; 6. 保持安静 - Remain Silent; 7. 查理查理 - Charlie Charlie; 8. 何必 - Why Bother; 9. 路人 - Stranger; 10. 天蝎座 - Scorpio
Boundary (边界): Studio album; Released: 13 July 2026; Label: YWWStudio & Sony Music	Track listing: 1. 序 – Prelude; 2. 劫 - Tribulation; 3. 边界 - Boundary; 4. 灌溉 - Irrigation; 5. 是什么 - What Is It; 6. 原来活着 - Be Present; 7. 好演员 - Good Actor; 8. 无常 - Impermanence; 9. 自由 - Freedom; 10. 圆 - Cycle of Life

=== Singles ===
Year	English title	Chinese title	Album	Notes
2014	"Always Be The Same For You"	—N/a	One and a Half Summer OST	
2014	"Somehow" (왠지그럼안될것같아)	为何就是无法如此	Yoon Jong-shin's Monthly Project	The first artist lined up for the Mystic89 Global Project
2016	"Death of the Premature Lotus"	莲殇	Ice Fantasy OST	
2017	"Decency"	体面	Undefined	The Ex-File 3: The Return of the Exes OST
2018		奉陪	Undefined	
2018		就差一个你	Non-album singles	
2019	"Black Horse"	黑馬	My True Friend OST	
2020	"Ping & Pong"	小乒和小乓	Non-album singles	
2022	"Moonfall"	月球陨落		Promotional Song for Moonfall
2022	"Nothing Can Stop Me Now"	—N/a		Promotional Song for Moonfall
2022	"Hedgehog"	刺猬		The first MV with singing and dancing
2022	"I Used To Be You"	我也曾是你		feat. CiCi Wang
2022	"Home in Time"	时间里的家	Hello, Brother OST	
2022	"Beautiful"	赴约而来		
2023	"Shadow"	影子		
2023	"Be Careful"	小心		
2023	"It's Me"	是我		Titular debut for Kelly's 4th album
2023	Why bother	何必		The Ex-file 4: Marriage Plan OST
2023	Drowning	夕阳向晚		The first MV as a director
2024	Left on read	已读不回	Scorpio《天蝎座》	The second MV with singing and dancing
2024	Werewolf	狼人	Scorpio《天蝎座》	
2024	For All I Care	与我无关		
2024	If We Meet Again	如果重逢		Promotional Song for "Venom: The Last Dance"
2024	Scorpio	天蝎座	Scorpio《天蝎座》	Titular debut for Kelly's 5th album
2025		赌		Promotional song for the series 鹦鹉
2026	Thorns	荆棘		Promotional song for the movie 绝密任务

== Awards and nominations ==
Year	Award	Category	Recipients	Result	Ref.
2015	19th China Music Awards	Channel [V] Newcomer Award	—N/a	Won	
2015	19th China Music Awards	Most Promising Singer-Songwriter	—N/a	Won	
2015	China Top Hits 2015	Most admired female singer-songwriter		Won	
2015	China Top Hits 2015	The 10 most admired		Won	
2018	1st GuitarChina Awards	Best Crossover Award		Won	
2018	23rd Huading Awards	Best Newcomer	The Ex-File 3: The Return of the Exes	Nominated	
2018	23rd Huading Awards	Best Original Film Song	"Decency (体面)"	Won	
2018	2018 Fashion Pop	Best Movie Song	"Decency (体面)"	Won	
2018	2018 Fashion Power	Fashion Power Singer of the Year		Won	
2019	14th KKBOX Music Awards	Singer of the Year		Won	
2019	23rd China Music Awards	Channel [V] Golden Song of the Year	Deep Conversation	Won	
2019	23rd China Music Awards	Most Popular Female Singer (Mainland China)		Won	
2019	2018 Global Chinese Golden Chart Awards	Most Popular Female Singer-Songwriter of the Year		Won	
2019	2018 Global Chinese Golden Chart Awards	Top 20 Golden Song of the Year	"Decency (体面)"	Won	
2019	The 2nd Shui Di Chou Charity Ceremony	Good Role Model Award		Won	
2019	2019 Asia Music Festival	Best Female Singer-Songwriter of the Year		Won	
2022	China TV Drama Awards 2022	Outstanding Actress of the Year	The Disappearing Child	Won	
2023	Weibo Music Awards 2022	Word-of-Mouth Singer of the Year	—N/a	Won	
2023	Chinese Top Ten Music Awards 2022	National Listener's Choice of Gold Song	"Hedgehog (刺猬)"	Won	
2023	Sohu Fashion Awards 2022	Notable Person of the Year	—N/a	Won	
2023	2022 Weibo Night	Outstanding Singer of the Year		Won	
2023	Weibo Music Awards 2023	Hot Singer of the Year		Won	
2024	2023 Weibo Night	All-rounder musician of the Year		Won	
2024	Weibo Music Awards 2024	Leap Producer of the Year		Won	
2025	2024 Weibo Night	All-rounder musician of the Year		Won	
