= Revenge for Love =

- Poster
- Traditional Chinese: 瘋岳撬佳人
- Simplified Chinese: 疯岳撬佳人
- Directed by: Chung Siu-hung; Tian Meng
- Written by: Gui Dongming; Qiu Huaiyang; Yu Qiao; Zha Wenbai; Zhang Yihui
- Produced by: Hong Guo
- Starring: Yue Yunpeng; Yuan Shanshan; Sun Jian
- Distributed by: Huayi Brothers et al.
- Release date: 14 February 2017
- Running time: 94 minutes
- Country: China
- Language: Mandarin
- Box office: CN¥35.2 million

Revenge for Love is a 2017 Chinese romantic comedy film co-directed by Chung Siu-hung and Tian Meng and starring Yue Yunpeng, Yuan Shanshan and Sun Jian. It was released in China on 14 February 2017.

== Plot ==
A boy had a crush on a girl, but was rejected big time in front of an audience. Many years later, the girl becomes a well known art designer, and the boy becomes a caretaker in a rehab. He befriends a billionaire for saving the old man's life. Backed by the billionaire to go after his love once again, but instead the man wants to get his revenge for the rejection that scared him all those years. He hires a company which specializes in match making, hoping that his dream girl would fall in love with him, so that he could take his turn rejecting her. As the story goes, old feelings come back and the man decides to abandon his plan. Before the man can come clean, his lies are discovered by the girl's ex, who wants to win her love back. With a regretted heart, despite the girl's disappointment in him, he convinces the billionaire to help the girl opening her own art exhibition. She finds out the truth, and finally realizes where her heart should be ...

== Cast ==
- Yue Yunpeng
- Yuan Shanshan
- Sun Jian
- Ma Yuan
- Shi Xiaoman
- Tang Jingmei
- Zhang Lei
- Gu Zheng
- Guo Degang
- Allen Ai
- Yang Neng
- Pan Binlong

== Reception ==
The film has grossed CN¥35.2 million in China.
