= Martial Universe =

- Promotional image
- Also known as: 武动乾坤之英雄出少年 武动乾坤之冰心在玉壶
- Genre: Fantasy; Adventure; Romance
- Based on: Wu Dong Qian Kun by Tiancan Tudou
- Written by: Zhang Li
- Directed by: Zhang Li
- Starring: Yang Yang; Zhang Tianai; Wang Likun; Wu Chun
- Composer: An Wei
- Country of origin: China
- Original language: Mandarin
- No. of seasons: 2
- No. of episodes: 40 (season 1), 20 (season 2)

Production
- Producer: Zhang Wei
- Production locations: Xiangshan Movie & Television Town
- Running time: 45 mins
- Production companies: Azure Media Corporation; Youku; Beijing Century Partner; Yuekai Entertainment; China Reading Limited; Horgos Shang Hui Television Culture Media

Original release
- Network: Dragon TV
- Release: August 7, 2018

Martial Universe (Chinese: 武动乾坤) is a 2018 Chinese television series based on the web novel Wu Dong Qian Kun by Tiancai Dudou. It stars Yang Yang, Zhang Tianai, Wang Likun and Wu Chun. The series is divided into two seasons.

The first season of the series aired on Dragon TV starting August 7, 2018. The second season of the series aired on Youku starting October 11, 2018.

== Synopsis ==
A mysterious seal introduces male protagonist Lin Dong to the art of cultivation, and he travels across the lands in order to hone his skills. He meets two vastly different women in Ling Qingzhu and Ying Huanhuan on his adventures, and gets romantically entangled with both.

Through sheer grit and determination, Lin Dong eventually becomes one of the most powerful and respected cultivators. As Lin Dong's powers increase, so does his knowledge of the world's deadliest secrets. He soon discovers the demon sect's plot to take over the world, and the three youths join forces with the righteous martial artists to defeat all evil and return peace to the land.

== Cast ==
=== Main ===
- Yang Yang as Lin Dong (林动)
  - Protagonist. A descendant of the Lin clan. He is chosen by the Emblem stone to be the successor of the Emblem master, who sealed away the Yimo demons a century ago, and take up the duty of fighting against the re-emergence of the Yimo. He first fell in my love with Ling Qingzhu but when she took too long to reciprocate his feelings, he also ended up liking Ying Huanhuan. But he could never let go of Ling Qingzhu so he married her first.
- Wang Likun as Ling Qingzhu (绫清竹)
  - Princess of Nine Heaven's Tai Qing Palace. Through an unexpected turn of events, she and Lin Dong end up sleeping with each other and she tracks him down to get her revenge, but instead becomes moved by his determination and fell in love with Lin Dong. She later became Lin Dong's first wife in the novel.
- Zhang Tian'ai as Ying Huanhuan (应欢欢)
  - Daughter of the leader of Dao Sect. Her real identity is that of a reincarnated ice lord and she awakens her powers in order to protect Dao Zong and help Lin Dong in his quest for revenge. She risked her life and did everything for Lin Dong. She later became his second wife.
- Wu Chun as Lin Langtian (林琅天)
  - A martial arts prodigy who bears the burden of leading the entire Lin Clan to greater success. However, he loses his way along the journey and succumbed to the schemes of the villains.

=== Supporting ===
- Ashton Chen as Lin Yan / Xiao Yan (林炎/小炎)
  - A tiger demon who used to follow Lin Dong around until he eventually transformed into a human. He possess immense strength, courage and loyalty. He is later found to be the successor of the Prehistoric ancestral emblem.
- Liu Yan as Mu Qianqian (穆芊芊) / Heavenly Seat King （天王殿）
  - Lin Langtian's senior sister. She is a seductress and a cunning, manipulative elder of the Yuan Sect she is eventually shown as a Heavenly Seat King - Yi Demon.
- Suo Xiaokun as Lin Diao (林貂)
  - A martem demon from the heavenly monk tribe. He was trapped inside a stone amulet until eventually discovered by Lin Dong. He starts out completely indifferent towards Lin Dong but ends up becoming his sworn brother alongside Xiao Yan. Later in the series, he became the acknowledged successor of the Thunder ancestral emblem.
- Dong Qing as Lin Qingtan (林青檀)
  - Lin Dong's foster younger sister. She harbors a dark and chilling power within her, which she eventually turns it into her cultivation. She is the successor of the Darkness ancestral Emblem.
- Yang Haoyu as Master Yan (岩大师)
  - Master of Yan Cheng Wizard Sect. Lin Dong's teacher.
- Li Xinliang as Teng Lei (腾儡)
  - Lord of the Wilderness, Prince of Magic Puppet Sect.
- Feng Junxi as Mo Ling (莫凌)
  - Prince of Dayan Royal Dynasty. Eventually became Lin Dong's good friend as he follows Lin Dong at Dao Sect where he died in Lin Dong's arms on their escape from the demon swarm.
- Xiao Siqin Gaowa as Xuan Su (萱素)
  - Supervisor of the Wanjin Chamber of Commerce auction house.
- Tse Kwan-ho as Lin Xiao (林啸)
  - Lin Dong's father. He sacrificed himself to shelve the Yimo.
- Wang Haitao as Chen Feng (辰风)
  - From the Darkness tribe.
- Kuang Can as Lu Yun (陆云)
- Ning Xiaohua as Sixth prince of Demon Tribe (魔族六王殿)
- Wu Yajun as Mu Lingshan (慕灵珊)
  - Little princess of the Fox tribe. Rescued by Lin Dong.
- Qian Long as Jiang Hao (蒋浩)
  - Disciple of Dao Sect. Lin Dong's senior brother. Sacrificed himself to the Demon swarm to protect his Sect brothers.
- Zhao Dan as Su Rou (苏柔)
  - A senior disciple of Nine Heaven's Tai Qing Palace. Ling Qingzhu's senior sister.
- Chen Yating as Mu Xinqing (慕心晴)
  - Elder princess of the Fox tribe.
- Ji Dongran as Lei Li (雷厉)
- Zhou Yiwei as Zhou Tong (周通)
  - Lin Dong's senior. A genius who was the only disciple who mastered the Desolation formation from the Dao Sect before Lin Dong. He died after their encounter with the Third Seat King - Yi Demon.
- Sun Yulin as Shen Qing (沈清)
  - Palace Leader of the Nine Heaven's Tai Qing Palace.

== Production ==
In March 2016, Azure Media Corporation announced that they have begun pre-production for Martial Universe and has engaged Zhang Li as the director for the series. The script for the series took two years to complete. Zhang Li revealed that the drama will be set in the culturally vibrant Spring & Autumn / Warring States Period, and that there would be increased emphasis on the wuxia elements.

Principal production began on November 14, 2016, at Xiangshan. Filming halted for two months for lead actor Yang Yang to recover from his injuries. The second stage of filming resumed in September 2017. On October 31, 2017, the production wrapped filming after 258 days.

=== Casting ===
On August 29, 2016, Yang Yang was announced as the male lead, Lin Dong.

On October 10, 2016, the lead actress was announced to be Zhang Tianai, who would play the role of Ling Qingzhu.

On November 14, 2016, the production team announced that lead actress Zhang Tianai would play Ying Huanhan instead. Actress Wang Likun was added to the production, taking over Zhang's previous role as Ling Qingzhu. A controversy arose there were rumors stating that Zhang had snatched the role of Gina Jin's, who was initially cast to play the role of Ying Huanhuan. In response to this, director Zhang Li said that after reviewing the script, the production team decided that Zhang Tianai was more suitable to play Ying Huanhuan, hence explaining the change in roles.

== Soundtrack ==
| No. | Title | Lyrics | Music | Singers | Length |
|---|---|---|---|---|---|
| 1. | "Puzzle (谜)" (Theme song) | Zhang Ying | Chen Xueran | Jason Zhang |
| 2. | "Starry Sky (星空)" | NZBZ | NZBZ | NZBZ |
| 3. | "That Youth (那少年)" | Xiao Siqi | Chen Xueran | Suo Xiaokun |
| 4. | "Exorcism (降魔)" | Guan Shan | An Wei | Zhang Lei |
| 5. | "Your Mirror (你的镜子)" | Guan Shan | An Wei | Zhang Lei |
| 6. | "Between Us (你我之间)" (Ending theme song) | Zhang Ying | Chen Xueran | Tanya Chua |

== Ratings ==
| Air date | Episode # | Dragon TV ratings | | | Youku National Internet ratings | | |
| Air date | Episode # | Ratings (%) | Audience share (%) | Rank | Ratings (%) | Audience share (%) | Rank |
|---|---|---|---|---|---|---|---|
| August 7 | 1-2 | 0.333 | 2.196 | 10 | 0.192 | 1.392 | 13 |
| August 8 | 3-4 | 0.285 | 1.858 | 12 | 0.187 | 1.397 | 13 |
| August 9 | 5-6 | 0.563 | 3.683 | 5 | 0.277 | 2.089 | 9 |
| August 14 | 7-8 | 0.432 | 2.724 | 8 | 0.19 | 1.401 | 13 |
| August 15 | 9-10 | 0.458 | 2.994 | 9 | 0.167 | 1.242 | 15 |
| August 16 | 11-12 | 0.643 | 4.177 | 4 | 0.233 | 1.803 | 10 |
| August 21 | 13-14 | 0.293 | 1.908 | 11 | 0.102 | 0.759 | 24 |
| August 22 | 15-16 | 0.373 | 2.412 | 10 | 0.159 | 1.243 | 14 |
| August 23 | 17-18 | 0.409 | 2.647 | 11 | 0.183 | 1.356 | 13 |
| August 28 | 19-20 | 0.656 | 4.15 | 3 | — | — | — |
| August 29 | 21-22 | 0.653 | 4.158 | 5 | 0.257 | 1.924 | 11 |
| August 30 | 23-24 | 0.669 | 4.371 | 4 | 0.27 | 2.138 | 10 |
| September 4 | 25-26 | 0.547 | 4.102 | 7 | 0.162 | 1.548 | 17 |
| September 5 | 27-28 | 0.485 | 4.729 | 9 | 0.134 | 1.785 | 17 |
| September 6 | 29-30 | 0.612 | 5.391 | 5 | 0.222 | 2.592 | 12 |
| September 11 | 31-32 | 0.525 | 3.966 | 8 | 0.16 | 1.487 | 14 |
| September 12 | 33-34 | 0.539 | 4.23 | 6 | 0.164 | 1.622 | 16 |
| September 13 | 35-36 | 0.66 | 5.287 | 5 | 0.219 | 2.298 | 11 |
| September 18 | 37-38 | 0.434 | 3.321 | 9 | 0.15 | 1.41 | 21 |
| September 19 | 39-40 | 0.430 | 3.341 | 9 | — | — | — |

== Awards and nominations ==
| Award | Category | Nominated work | Result | Ref. |
|---|---|---|---|---|
| Golden Bud - The Third Network Film And Television Festival | IP Adaptation of the Year | Martial Universe | Won | |

== International broadcast ==
| Channel | Location | Broadcast start date | Note |
|---|---|---|---|
| Dragon TV | Mainland China | 7 August 2018 | Tuesday, Wednesday, Thursday 22:00 (two eps) |
| DramaFever Viki.com Pluto.tv | U.S., Canada and Latin America | 7 August 2018 | Unknown |
| FPT Play | Vietnam | 7 August 2018 | Tuesday, Wednesday, Thursday 21:30 (two eps) |
| Star Chinese Channel | Malaysia, Singapore, Taiwan, Hong Kong, Indonesia, Philippines, Thailand, Canada, U.S. | 7 August 2018 | Monday to Friday 20:00 |
| dimsum | Malaysia, Brunei, Singapore (via Starhub Go) | 8 August 2018 | Wednesday to Friday 12:00 |
| 8TV | Malaysia | 3 September 2018 | Monday to Friday 20:30 |
| Channel China | South Korea | 7 November 2018 | Unknown |
| CTV8 HD | Cambodia | 2019 | Unknown |
| MX Player | India | 7 August 2018 | Unknown |
| VTV3 | Vietnam | 2019 | Monday to Friday 12:00 |
| Channel 3 | Thailand | 15 March 2023 | Monday 23:45 Tuesday, Wednesday and Friday 22:45 |
