= Tang Shiyi =

Chinese dancer

Tang Shiyi (Chinese: 唐诗逸; pinyin: Táng Shīyì), is a Chinese dancer. She is a National First-Class Performer at the China National Opera and Dance Drama Theater. She also serves as a member of the All-China Youth Federation and a review committee member of the China National Arts Fund.

In 2006, Tang Shiyi won the gold medal in the Junior Classical Chinese Dance category at the 8th Wenhua Arts Institutions Taoli Cup Dance Competition for her performance in Biyu Youlan. In 2009, she won the gold medal for performance in the Youth category at the 9th Wenhua Arts Institutions Taoli Cup Dance Competition and the silver medal at the 5th CCTV National Television Dance Competition for her solo dance Boundless Nostalgia. In 2010, she played the lead role of Zhen Fu, the Goddess of the Luo River, in the dance drama Shuiyue Luoshen. The production won the Gold Award in the Dance Drama and Dance Poem category at the 8th China Dance Lotus Awards. For her performance, Tang received the Special Award from the competition's organizing committee and the Outstanding Performance Award at the 10th China Arts Festival. She subsequently starred in several dance dramas, including Confucius, Qia Tong Xue Shao Nian, and Zhaojun. In 2022, she participated in the third season of the reality television show Sisters Who Make Waves and ultimately secured a spot in the final group.

=== Early Life ===
Tang Shiyi was born in Yongzhou, Hunan. At the age of 6, her mother enrolled her in dance classes at the Yongzhou Youth Palace. There she caught attention of Liu Cuiling, a dance instructor and professional dancer, who became her early mentor. Tang spent six years training with the Lengshuitan Children's Art Troupe (also known as Shengshen Dance Troupe), where she received foundational dance instruction and participated in various performances and competitions. She perfomed with the Troupe at events including Tianjin International Children's Culture and Art Festival, the inaugural China Dance Festival, and the second "Little Lotus" National Children's Dance Showcase.

Tang Shiyi
- Nationality: Chinese
- Born: September 6, 1990 Yongzhou, Hunan
- Occupations: Dancer, actress
- Genre: Chinese classical dance
- Education: Beijing Dance Academy, Peking University (master)
