= Han Ji-an =

South Korean actress

- Born: March 17, 1991 (age 35); South Korea
- Education: Dongguk University
- Occupation: Actress
- Years active: 2014–present
- Agent: Kook Entertainment

Korean name
- Hangul: 김희진
- RR: Gim Huijin
- MR: Kim Hŭijin

Stage name
- Hangul: 한지안
- RR: Han Jian
- MR: Han Chian

Han Ji-an (Korean: 한지안; born March 17, 1991), birth name Kim Hee-jin (김희진), is a South Korean actress.

== Filmography ==
=== Television series ===
Year	Title	Role	Network	Notes/Ref.
2014	Schoolgirl Detectives	Nam Hyo-jo	JTBC	
2014	KBS Drama Special: "Monster"	Min-ah	KBS	
2015	My Mother Is a Daughter-in-law	Jeon Eul-hee	SBS	
2016	Mrs. Cop 2	Lee Jin-ah	SBS	
2016	That Sun in the Sky	Oh Geum-soon	KBS	
2021	So I Married the Anti-fan	Oh In-hyung	Naver TV	

=== Film ===
Year	Title	Role	Notes/Ref.
2014	The Plan	Se-hee (young)	
2018	The Princess and the Matchmaker	Gisaeng 1	
2018	The Vanished	Hye-jin	

== Theater/musical ==
Year	Title
	A Midsummer Night's Dream
	토끼와 포수
	물고기축제
