= Legend of the Naga Pearls =

- Movie Poster
- Simplified Chinese: 鲛珠传
- Directed by: Yang Lei
- Screenplay by: Yang Lei; Tan Cheung; Xu Zhaoqing
- Based on: Novoland: City of Desperate Love
- Produced by: Gordon Chan; Ren Zhonglun; Peter Lam; Fan Feifei
- Starring: Wang Talu; Zhang Tianai; Sheng Guansen
- Cinematography: Arthur Wong
- Edited by: Feng Qihuan
- Music by: Ikurō Fujiwara
- Production companies: Media Asia Films; Shanghai Film Group
- Distributed by: Well Go USA; Aeon Pix Studios (India)
- Release date: 11 August 2017
- Country: China
- Language: Mandarin
- Box office: US$16,392,484

Legend of the Naga Pearls (Chinese: 鲛珠传) is a 2017 Chinese fantasy adventure film directed by Yang Lei, starring Wang Talu, Zhang Tianai and Sheng Guansen. It is the first film to be set in the fictional world of Novoland. The film was released on August 11, 2017 in China.

== Synopsis ==
Once upon a time, in the city of Uranopolis, lived the Winged Tribe, a race capable of flying. But after losing a battle to humans, they gradually lost their ability to fly. Xue Lie, a royal descendant from the Winged Tribe, begins a search for the magical Naga Pearls in order to destroy the Human Tribe and avenge the death of his people. When Ni the thief, Gali the human prince, and Hei Yu the constable accidentally lay hands on a mysterious box containing the Naga Pearls, they find themselves hunted down by Xue Lie. After they have lost the pearls to Xue Lie eventually, they decide to team up and rush back to Uranopolis to thwart his evil plans.

== Cast ==
- Wang Talu as Ni Kongkong
- Zhang Tianai as Hei Yu
- Sheng Guansen as Gali
- Simon Yam as Xue Lie
- Jiang Luxia as He Ying
- Wang Xun
- Zhao Jian
- Xing Yu
- Hu Bing
- Sui He

== Critical reception ==
The Hollywood Reporter called the film "diverting and attractive, but not novel enough to attract viewers", and South China Morning Post called the film "enjoyable but generic". However, it received praise for its production design and "relentlessly earnest desire to please".
