= Liu Yan (actress) =

Chinese actress, hostess and singer (born 1980)

- 柳岩
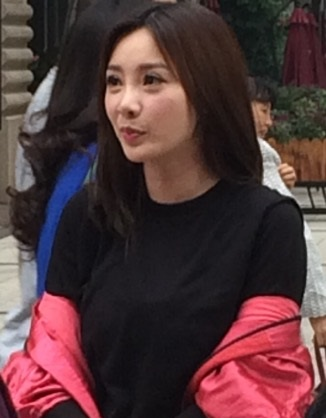
- Liu in 2015
- Born: Yang Liu; 8 November 1980 (age 45); Hengyang, Hunan, China
- Other name: Ada Liu
- Education: Hunan Normal University; Communication University of China
- Occupations: Actress; hostess; singer
- Years active: 1999–present
- Agent: Enlight Media
- Musical career
- Genres: Mandopop

Chinese name
- Traditional Chinese: 柳岩
- Simplified Chinese: 柳岩
Transcriptions
Standard Mandarin
- Hanyu Pinyin: Liǔ Yán

Birth name
- Traditional Chinese: 楊柳
- Simplified Chinese: 杨柳
Transcriptions
Standard Mandarin
- Hanyu Pinyin: Yáng Liǔ

Liu Yan (Chinese: 柳岩; born 8 November 1980), also known as Ada Liu, is a Chinese actress, hostess and singer. She won the "Best New Artist" at the 2nd Top Chinese Music Awards and the "Best Promising Host" at the 3rd Zongyi Award, in 2010 the Most Influencing Host of China named she on their list of the 10 Greatest hosts in Television.

Liu is noted for her roles as Dai Yiyi and Jiajia in Badges of Fury (2013) and The Incredible Truth (2013) respectively.

== Life ==
=== Early life ===
Liu was born Yang Liu (杨柳) in Hengyang, Hunan, on 8 November 1980, with her ancestral home in Wuhu, Anhui. She was raised in Guangzhou, Guangdong and is the younger of two children, with an elder brother.

Liu became the student in charge of entertainment in her class when she was a pupil. Liu enrolled at Hunan Normal University, earning a bachelor's degree in Chinese literature.

=== Hosting career ===
Liu joined Guangdong Television to host television in 1999, at the same year, she entered Communication University of China.

In March 2000, Liu hosted Financial Report and Green News in Southern Television Guangdong. From 2001 to 2002, she hosted Walking in Guangzhou.

In November 2002, Liu joined Hunan Public Channel and hosted Public News.

In 2004, Liu returned to Guangzhou, she hosted Guangdong, Hong Kong and Macao in Guangdong Television.

In December 2005, Liu joined Enlight Media.

=== Acting career ===
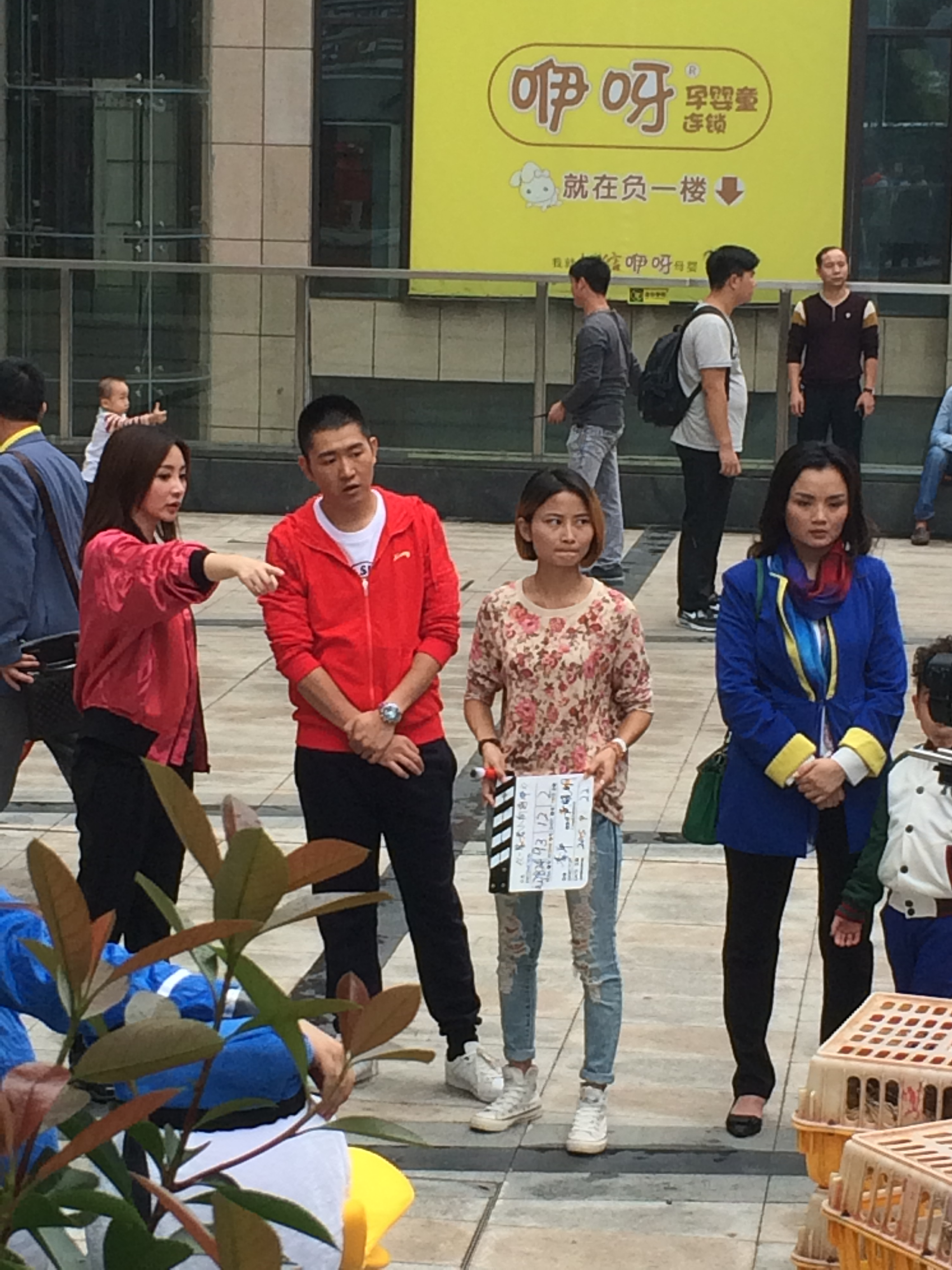
Liu (leftmost) and Peng Yu (second from left) were filming the comedy television series A First Forward in Changsha, Hunan.

Liu made her acting debut in 2008 when she was chosen to act as a supporting actor in fantasy film Painted Skin.

In 2009, Liu acted in the historical television series The Legend of Yang Guifei directed by You Xiaogang, playing the role of Empress Zhang.

Liu had a minor role as Yun Mei in fantasy film Mural (2011), and also starred in Wong Jing's romance film Marry Mr. Prefect.

In 2012, Liu was cast in the historical television series Against the Blade of Honour, which adapted from Taiwanese novelist Gu Long's wuxia novel of the same title. However the series has not been broadcast to date.

After playing minor roles in various films and television series, Liu then acted bigger roles in Badges of Fury, The Incredible Truth, Jian Bing Man and I Belonged to You, which enjoyed commercial box office success in China and she quickly rose to prominence.

In 2016, Liu reunited with fellow I Belonged to You co-star Yang Yang in xianxia drama Martial Universe. She was nominated for the Best Supporting Actress award with her performance in military drama Young Marshal.

== Filmography ==
=== Film ===
Year	English title	Chinese title	Role	Ref.
2008	Painted Skin	画皮		
2009	Mar's Baby	火星宝贝之火星没事		
2011	Mural	画壁	Yun Mei	
2012	Helicopter	灰机灰机	Xiaomei	
2012	The Zodiac Mystery	十二星座离奇事件	Cui Miao	
2012	Crying and Laughing	哭笑不得	Lili	
2012	The Next 11 Days	冰雪11天	A police's wife	
2012	Marrying Mr. Perfect	嫁个100分男人	Anji Li'na	
2013	The Four II	四大名捕2	Ru Yan	
2013	Badges of Fury	不二神探	Dai Yiyi	
2013	The Incredible Truth	人间蒸发	Jiajia	
2014	The Four III	四大名捕3	Ru Yan	
2014	Ex-Files	前任攻略	Shang Dan	
2014	The Breakup Guru	分手大师	Madame Tang	
2015	An Inspector Calls	神探駕到	Wan Jun	
2015	Jian Bing Man	煎饼侠	herself	
2016	The Family Running Forward	一家老小向前冲	Yan Zilan	
2016	I Belonged to You	从你的全世界路过	Yan Zi	
2016	See You Tomorrow	摆渡人		
2017	Buddies in India	大闹天竺	Wu Jing	
2017	The Thousand Faces of Dunjia	奇门遁甲	Hua Xiangrong	
2018	Monster Hunt 2	捉妖记2		
2018	Legend of the Ancient Sword	古剑奇谭之流月昭明	Cang Ming	
2018	Master Z: The Ip Man Legacy	叶问外传：张天志	Julia	
2019	My Dear Liar	受益人	Yue Miaomiao	
2020	The Winners	大赢家	Yu Haijiao	
2021	Fake Bodyguard	冒牌大保镖	Ye Mingzhu	
2021	Tempting Hearts	有一点动心		
2022	The Tai Chi Master	张三丰	Yue'er	

=== Television series ===
Year	English title	Chinese title	Role	Notes/Ref.
2009		鹰与枭	Huang Zemin	
2009	The Legend of Yang Guifei	杨贵妃秘史	Empress Zhang	
2010	Harmony Brings Wealth 2	家和万事兴之幸福的味道	Yuanyuan	
2011	Love Keeps Going	爱上查美乐	Chu Shaoyin	
2012	Diors Man	屌丝男士		
2012		风雨劈柴院	Qi Juan	
2012	My Mother-in-law's Happy Life	岳母的幸福生活	Shen Zi	
2013	Let's Get Married	咱们结婚吧	Lan Weiwei	
2013	Brother like These	香瓜七兄弟	Nurse Liu	
2013	Diors Man 2	屌丝男士2		
2014	My Grandfather 1945	我姥爷1945	Xiao Hong	
2014	Diors Man 3	屌丝男士3		
2015	Women on the Breadfruit Tree	面包树上的女人	Anna Fei	
2015	Flying Swords of Dragon Gate	龙门飞甲	Bao Mingyu	
2015	War of 2	两个女人的战争	Zhao Xinmei	
2015	Diors Man 4	屌丝男士4		
2016	Happy Mitan	欢喜密探	Hong Erniu	
2016	Young Marshal	少帅	Xueliang's sister-in-law	Cameo
2018	Double Happiness	欢乐女神捕	Empress	
2018	Huotoujun Inn	伙头军客栈	Liu Nan	Cameo
2018	Martial Universe	武动乾坤	Mu Qianqian	
2018	Royal Highness	回到明朝当王爷之杨凌传	Cheng Qiyun	
2019	The World is Not Fraudulent	天下无诈		Cameo
2019	I Am The Head Teacher	我是班主任		Cameo
2020	The Best of Times	最好的时代	Xiaoye Lizi	
2021	Legendary Hotel	大饭店传奇		Guest actress
2022	A Dream of Splendor	梦华录	Sun Sanniang	
TBA	Shanghai Picked Flowers	十里洋场拾年花	Zhou Fangfei	

== Discography ==
=== Albums ===
Year	English title	Chinese title	Ref.
2009	Colors	岩色	

=== Singles ===
Year	English title	Chinese title	Album	Ref.
2014	"Mr. Perfect"	男神		
2014	"Love at First Sight"	一见钟情		with Hwang Chan-sung
2014	"Buried Love"	绝口不提		

== Awards and nominations ==
Year	Award	Category	Nominated work	Result	Ref.
2011	4th China TV Drama Awards	Best New Actress	Love Keeps Going	Nominated	
2016	22nd Shanghai Television Festival	Best Supporting Actress	Young Marshall	Nominated	
2019	Jinri Toutiao Awards Ceremony	Breakthrough Actress of the Year	—N/a	Won	
2019	11th Macau International Movie Festival	Best Actress	My Dear Liar	Won	
2020	29th Huading Awards	Best Actress	My Dear Liar	Nominated	
2020	33rd Golden Rooster Awards	Best Actress	My Dear Liar	Nominated	
2020	16th Changchun Film Festival	Best Actress	My Dear Liar	Nominated	
2020	17th Guangzhou Student Film Festival	Favorite Actress	My Dear Liar	Won	
