= Zhang Tian'ai =

Chinese actress

- 张天爱
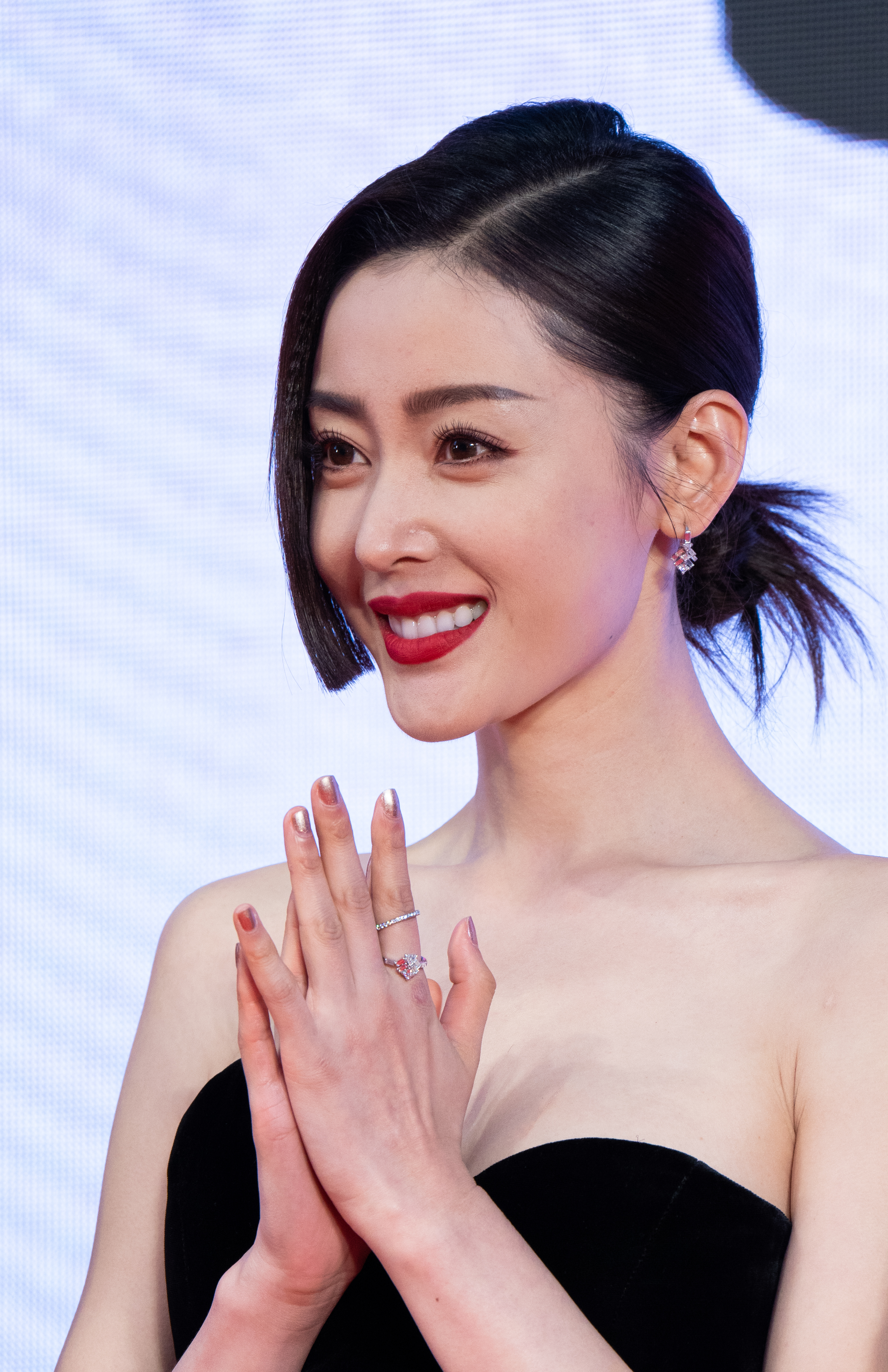
- Zhang at the 2019 Tokyo International Film Festival
- Born: 28 October 1988 (age 38); Harbin, Heilongjiang, China
- Education: Beijing Film Academy
- Occupations: Actress; model
- Years active: 2008–present
- Agent: FWS (北京喜天影视文化有限公司)
- Relatives: Zhang Yan (brother)

Chinese name
- Traditional Chinese: 張天愛
- Simplified Chinese: 张天爱
Transcriptions
Standard Mandarin
- Hanyu Pinyin: Zhāng Tiān'aì

Zhang Tian'ai (Chinese: 张天爱; born 28 October 1988), also known by her English name Crystal Zhang, is a Chinese actress and model. She is best known for her breakout role in the 2015 hit web-drama Go Princess Go.

== Early life and education ==
Zhang Tian'ai was born 28 October 1988 in Harbin, Heilongjiang, China. Zhang attended high school in Japan, majoring in costume design. She then enrolled in the Beijing Film Academy.

== Career ==
=== 2008–2014: Beginnings and rising popularity ===
In 2008, Zhang was invited by South Korean director Woody Han to star in Korean short film Cherry Blossom alongside Korean actor Kim Soo-hyun. After which, she continued to appear in minor supporting roles whilst working as an advertisement model. Zhang made her official acting debut in the drama The Second Life of My Husband, which aired in 2013.

Zhang first gained attention in 2014 when she acted alongside Sun Honglei in spy drama The Legendary Sniper. She won the Best Supporting Actress award at the 2nd Hengdian Film and TV Festival of China for her performance.

=== 2015–present: Breakout and leading roles ===
In 2015, Zhang starred in the historical romance web drama Go Princess Go. The low-budget series unexpectedly became a commercial hit, and shot Zhang to fame. Following her fame, Zhang was cast in bigger projects.

In 2016, Zhang starred in the romance film I Belonged to You alongside Deng Chao. The film was a commercial success and earned more than 800 million yuan ($118 million) at the box office.

In 2017, she starred in comedy film Father and Son with Da Peng and Fan Wei, and in fantasy adventure film Legend of the Naga Pearls with Darren Wang. She also featured in the war film The Founding of an Army as Soong Mei-ling, as well as fantasy-mystery film Legend of the Demon Cat directed by Chen Kaige. Zhang was nominated at the Hundred Flowers Award for Best Supporting Actress with her performance as Soong.

In 2018, Zhang starred in the romantic comedy drama The Evolution Of Our Love alongside Zhang Ruoyun. The same year, she starred as the female lead Ying Huanhuan in fantasy-action drama Martial Universe alongside Yang Yang.

In 2019, Zhang starred in the aviation disaster film The Captain as a flight attendant. The same year she starred in the workplace romance drama Crocodile and Plover Bird as an aspiring environmentalist.

In 2020, Zhang appeared in CCTV New Year's Gala for the first time, performing a dance number titled "Quan". She is set to star in the historical film A'mai Joins the Army as the titular character. The same year, she was cast in the wuxia drama Sword Snow Stride written by Wang Juan.

From May 20 to August 5, 2022, Zhang participated in the third season of Sisters Who Make Waves, a Chinese survival reality television show where female celebrities over 30 years old competes to debut in a ten-member girl group. She eventually placed tenth in the finals and debuted in X-Sister.

== Filmography ==
=== Film ===
Year	English title	Chinese title	Role	Notes/Ref.
2009	Cherry Blossom	落櫻	Zhang Lina	Short film
2014	Uncle Victory	勝利		Cameo
2016	I Belonged to You	從你的全世界路過	Yao Ji	
2017	Father and Son	父子雄兵	Liu Wen	
2017	The Founding of an Army	建军大业	Soong Mei-ling	
2017	Legend of the Naga Pearls	鮫珠傳	Hei Yu	
2017	Legend of the Demon Cat	妖貓傳	Yu Lian	
2017	Travel Through an Alluring Smile	穿越笑倾城		Short film
2018	Miss Puff	泡芙小姐	Civil Affairs Bureau' employee	Cameo
2018	Spider-Man: Into the Spider-Verse	蜘蛛侠：平行宇宙	Gwen Stacy	Voice-dubbed
2019	The Captain	中国机长	Huang Jia	
2021	A'mai Joins the Army	阿麦从军	Mai Sui	
2026	All The Good Eyes	森中有林	Lian Jie	

=== Television series ===
Year	English title	Chinese title	Role	Network	Notes
2013	The Second Life of My Husband	老公的春天		Anhui TV	Guest appearance
2013	Mop Lady's Spring	抹布女也有春天	An Di	Jiangsu TV	
2014	Strange Coffee	怪咖啡	Zhu Liye	Tencent	
2014	The Legendary Sniper	二炮手	Ling Zhiyu	Dragon TV, Jiangsu TV, Zhejiang TV	
2015	Go Princess Go	太子妃升職記	Zhang Pengpeng	LeTV	
2015	Men	男人帮·朋友	Mu Tian		
2016	My Fair Lady	我的朋友陳白露小姐	Hai Tang	iQiyi	
2018	The Evolution of Our Love	爱情进化论	Ai Ruoman	Dragon TV, Zhejiang TV	
2018	Martial Universe	武动乾坤	Ying Huanhuan	Dragon TV	
2019	Crocodile and Plover Bird	鳄鱼与牙签鸟	Li Nan'en	Hunan TV	
2020	Held in the Lonely Castle	清平乐	Chen Xichun	Hunan TV	Guest appearance
2020	Together	在一起	Nurse	Dragon TV	
TBA	If I Can Never Love You	如果可以，绝不爱你	Zhou Ran	Youku	
TBA	Young and Beautiful	我的漂亮朋友	Liu Wenjing	Tencent	
TBA	Sword Snow Stride	雪中悍刀行	Nangong Pushe	Tencent	

=== Television shows ===
Year	Title	Role	Notes	Ref.
2022	Sisters Who Make Waves Season 3	Contestant	Chinese survival reality show that determined X-Sister members Finished 10th	

=== Variety show ===
Year	English title	Chinese title	Role	Network	Notes/Ref.
2019	Aiya Good Figure	哎呀好身材	Cast member	Mango TV	

== Discography ==
Year	English title	Chinese title	Album	Notes
2016	"Between Us"	我们之间		I Belonged to You OST
2020	"Hand in Hand"	手足		Charity song for Coronavirus

== Awards and nominations ==
Year	Award	Category	Nominated work	Result	Ref.
2015	2nd Hengdian Film and TV Festival of China	Best Supporting Actress	The Legendary Sniper	Won	
2015	Mobile Video Festival	Charismatic Actress Award	—N/a	Won	
2016	1st Golden Guduo Media Awards	Best Actress	Go Princess Go	Won	
2016	1st Golden Guduo Media Awards	Weibo Fans' Choice Popularity Award	Go Princess Go	Won	
2016	L'Officiel Fashion Night	Most Talented Actor	—N/a	Won	
2016	Weibo Fan Festival	Powerstar Ranking Person of the Year	—N/a	Won	
2016	23rd Cosmo Beauty Ceremony	Rising Idol Award	—N/a	Won	
2016	Youku Young Choice Awards	Hot Artist of the Year	—N/a	Won	
2017	China Original Literature Billboard Awards	Most Popular Actress	I Belonged to You	Won	
2017	Weibo Night Awards	Popular Artist of the Year	—N/a	Won	
2017	2nd Weibo Movie Awards Ceremony	Most Anticipated Film Goddess	—N/a	Won	
2018	34th Hundred Flowers Awards	Best Supporting Actress	The Founding of an Army	Nominated	
2019	Weibo Night Awards	Popular Artist of the Year	—N/a	Won	
2019	4th China Quality Television Drama Ceremony	Breakthrough Actress Award (Weekly drama)	Martial Universe	Won	
2019	6th The Actors of China Award Ceremony	Best Actress (Emerald Category)	Martial Universe	Nominated	
2019	32nd Tokyo International Film Festival; Gold Crane Awards	Most Popular Actress	The Captain	Won	
2019	16th Esquire Man At His Best Awards	Breakthrough Artist of the Year	—N/a	Won	
2020	Weibo Awards Ceremony	Rising Artist of the Year	—N/a	Won	
