= Father and Son (2017 Chinese film) =

- Chinese: 父子雄兵
- Directed by: Yuan Weidong (Chinese: 袁卫东)
- Screenplay by: Su Liang(Chinese: 苏亮), Mao Haiqing (Chinese: 毛海青)
- Starring: Dong Chengpeng, Fan Wei, Zhang Tian'ai, Qiao Shan, Vivian Wu, Simon Yam
- Production companies: Wanda Film, Beijing Enlight Pictures, Shanghai Ruyi Entertainment, Xi Tian Film
- Release date: July 21, 2017
- Running time: 105 mins
- Country: China
- Language: mandarin

Father and Son (Chinese: 父子雄兵) is a 2017 Chinese comedy film directed by Yuan Weidong (袁卫东) and starring Da Peng, Fan Wei, Zhang Tian'ai, Qiao Shan, Vivian Wu and Simon Yam.

== Plot ==
Fan Xiaobing, a seemingly successful businessman, is a loser and a conman in real life. He has an awful relationship with his father Fan Yingxiong, who used to serve in the army. To pay back the debt from gangsters, Xiaobing comes up with a terrible plan: claiming his dad has died and then collecting condolence money. In order to hold a fake funeral, Xiaobing tricks his father Yingxiong to leave the city for a travel. But Yingxiong returns unexpectedly and puts this farce to an end. Gangsters take Xiaobing to Macao to take his life. Yingxiong decides to go to Macao with his old comrades to save the son.

== Cast ==
- Da Peng as Fan Xiaobing
- Fan Wei as Fan Yingxiong
- Zhang Tian'ai
- Qiao Shan
- Vivian Wu
- Simon Yam
