= Buddies in India =

Chinese action adventure comedy film

- Chinese teaser poster
- Chinese: 大闹天竺
- Directed by: Wang Baoqiang
- Screenplay by: Shu Huan; Ding Ding
- Starring: Wang Baoqiang; Bai Ke; Vikramjeet Virk; Yue Yunpeng; Liu Yan
- Cinematography: Chan Chi-ying
- Edited by: Tu Yiran
- Music by: Peter Kam; Julius Packiam
- Production companies: Lekaihua Entertainment (Wuxi); Huoerguosi Enlight Media 浙江诸暨升维传媒有限公司; Beijing Hairun Pictures; Tianjin Maoyan Media; YiMa Shidai Media (Beijing); Shanghai Mengmi Media; Beijing Wanhe Tianyi Media
- Distributed by: Tianjin Maoyan Media; Beijing Enlight Pictures; Huaxia Film Distribution
- Release date: 28 January 2017 (China)
- Running time: 99 minutes
- Country: China
- Language: Mandarin
- Box office: US$107.9 million

Buddies in India (Chinese: 大闹天竺) is a 2017 Chinese action adventure comedy film directed by comedian and actor Wang Baoqiang, in his directorial debut, and also starring Wang. It was released in China by Tianjin Maoyan Media, Beijing Enlight Pictures and Huaxia Film Distribution on January 28, 2017. The film has Hindi songs with lyrics written by lyricist Alok Ranjan Jha and composed by Sunny Subramanian. Chinni Prakash choreographed the song sequence.

== Plot ==
An acrobatic monkey loving circus guy accompanies the son of a recently deceased CEO to India to recover his will. His uncle sends many thugs to eliminate them but by sheer luck and dedication of the acrobatic circus man, the young heir of the corporation escapes with his life. Reaching their destination point they understand the acrobat was a long lost son of the CEO's friend and he send his son to India with the aim to fulfill his promise to his friend who is staying in India.

== Cast ==
- Wang Baoqiang as Sun Wukong
- Bai Ke as Tang Sanzang
- Yue Yunpeng as Zhu Bajie
- Ada Liu as Sha Wujing
- Vikramjeet Virk as Bull Demon King
- Liu Haoran as Erlang Shen
- Shruti Sodhi as Queen Iron Fan
- Liu Xiao Ling Tong as Wu Shen

== Production ==
Principal photography was taking place in India in early May 2016. The movie is scheduled to be released on 28 January 2017.

Vikramjeet Virk is the first Indian actor to play the much-revered character of the Bull King.

Indian studio Yash Raj Films was involved in line production, assisting with the film's shooting in India.
