= So I Married an Anti-fan (film) =

So I Married an Anti-Fan
- Theatrical release poster
- Simplified Chinese: 所以 , 我和黑粉结婚了
- Hanyu Pinyin: Suǒyǐ, wǒ hé hēi fěn jiéhūnle
- Directed by: Kim Jae-young
- Screenplay by: Kim Jae-young
- Story by: Kim Eun-jeong (novel)
- Based on: So I Married An Anti-fan by Jiwan
- Starring: Chanyeol; Yuan Shanshan; Seohyun; Jiang Chao
- Production companies: The Comedians Pictures; Bona Film Group; Beijing Jiecheng Shidai Media; Beijing Huanle Pictures
- Distributed by: Polybona Films
- Release date: June 30, 2016
- Running time: 120 minutes
- Country: China
- Language: Mandarin
- Box office: CN¥74.4 million

So I Married an Anti-Fan (also known as No One's Life Is Easy) is a Chinese romantic comedy film directed by Kim Jae-young and starring Chanyeol, Yuan Shanshan, Seohyun and Jiang Chao. It is based on a South Korean web novel So I Married An Anti-fan (Korean: 그래서 나는 안티 팬과 결혼했다) by Jiwan. The film was released in China by Bona Film Group on June 30, 2016.

== Plot ==
Hoo Joon is a Korean Hallyu star working in Shanghai, China. Fang Miao Miao is a jobbing entertainment reporter working for a magazine. By chance, Miao Miao catches Hoo Joon meeting fellow Hallyu star Ai Lin at a nightclub and photographs the two in what appears to be a romantic encounter. Since Ai Lin is dating a third star, Gao Xiang, who is a friend and colleague of Hoo Joon, publication of the photographs would lead to reputational damage to both Hoo Joon and Ai Lin. Hoo Joon catches Miao Miao in the act seizes her cellphone and destroys it. Contracted, as a spokesman, performer and personality to a Chinese conglomerate, Hoo Joon's management sets out to discredit and silence Miao Miao, and she is fired from her job.

Furious and powerless against the forces arrayed against her, Miao Miao becomes Hoo Joon's anti-fan. Venting her frustration online, with one woman pickets and petty acts of graffiti, Miao Miao becomes notorious for her actions and her altercations with Hoo Joon's legion of fans. Her notoriety and Hoo Joon's popularity leads to the two being approached to appear in a reality television series together; jobless and facing the prospect of becoming homeless, Miao Miao reluctantly accepts the job, stating that her goal in the show will be to destroy Hoo Joon. Working first as his road manager, Miao Miao soon finds herself co-habiting with her nemesis.

Thrown together, Miao Miao and Hoo Joon learn more about each other both through the challenges and tasks set for them by their television director and when attempts by Miao Miao to prank and play practical jokes on Hoo Joon backfire. As they become more comfortable in each other's company, they reveal their dreams and pasts to each other, and eventually learn to trust in each other. Miao Miao discovers Hoo Joon surreptitiously meeting Ai Lin again, she photographs the meeting again and is again discovered by Hoo Joon. However rather than destroy her phone again, Hoo Joon chooses to trust and confide in her. He reveals that he and Ai Lin had been lovers and that, together with Gao Xiang, had been trainees together, working to debut together as a band. When chance saw Hoo Joon come to public prominence through a bit part, their management company changed their plans and debuted Hoo Joon alone as a soloist. Feeling betrayed, Ai Lin and Gao Xiang turned to each other for consolation, though it seems Ai Lin has held a torch for Hoo Joon through the intervening years.

Appearing more and more on screen and in public together as a couple, Miao Miao comes to realise that she has fallen in love with Hoo Joon, a love that Hoo Joon appears to reciprocate when he asks her to be his partner at a major entertainment event. However, when Miao Miao sees Ai Lin wearing the same pendant as her, a present from Hoo Joon, Miao Miao comes to believe that Hoo Joon has been using her as cover to continue a relationship with Ai Lin. Feeling used and betrayed, Miao Miao quits the television show and snubs attempts by Hoo Joon to explain. Miao Miao is offered a job by her old magazine in return for dishing the dirt on Hoo Joon, but still in love with him, she refuses. Unfortunately, Miao Miao's in depth article detailing Hoo Joon's faults and indiscretions falls into the hands of the magazine and is published. Miao Miao's article is a smear piece written in anger, and she knew it to be so when she attempted to delete it. However, with photos to back up her allegations, the public come to believe it to be true and Hoo Joon's reputation is ruined.

Despite learning the truth of the pendants, Hoo Joon had asked his assistant to buy Miao Miao a present, and it was Ai Lin wishing to drive a wedge between Miao Miao and Hoo Joon who suggested the purchase of the pendant before buying an identical one herself. Miao Miao finds it impossible to face Hoo Joon again, and with nowhere else to go in Shanghai, buys a plane ticket back to her hometown, Harbin. Aboard the flight Miao Miao finds herself sitting next to Hoo Joon. He says that he is on his way to scout some locations, and suggests that they should make a film together. She agrees with a kiss.

== Cast ==
- Chanyeol as Hou Zhun / Hoo Joon
- Yuan Shanshan as Fang Miao Miao / Lee Geun-Yeong
- Seohyun as Ai Lin / Irene
- Jiang Chao as Gao Xiang

== Original soundtrack ==
Title	Artist(s)	Peak chart positions
Title	Artist(s)	CHN Billboard V Chart
"I Hate You": Released: June 14, 2016	Chanyeol and Yuan Shanshan	11

== Reception ==
The film has grossed CN¥74.4 million in China. The film ranked 4th on Weibo's "Top 10 films of 2016" year-end list, the film also has the highest number of reviews (568,878) and movie topic readership (39,900 million) among the top 10 films.

The film has a cumulative worldwide gross of $12,194,083.

== Awards ==
Year	Award	Category	Recipient	Result
2017	5th YinYueTai VChart Awards	Best Collaboration	Chanyeol and Yuan Shanshan (OST "I Hate You")	Won
