= Jian Bing Man =

- Theatrical release poster
- Directed by: Da Peng
- Screenplay by: Da Peng; Su Biao
- Starring: Da Peng; Mabel Yuan; Liu Yan
- Cinematography: Danny Chen
- Edited by: Tu Yiran
- Music by: Zhao Yingjun
- Production companies: Wanda Pictures; Tianjin Golden Fox Culture; New Classics Media
- Release dates: 16 June 2015 (SIFF); 17 July 2015 (China)
- Running time: 113 minutes
- Country: China
- Language: Mandarin
- Budget: US$12.9 million
- Box office: US$187 million

Jian Bing Man (Chinese: 煎饼侠; pinyin: Jiān Bǐng Xiá) is a 2015 Chinese superhero parody film directed, written and also starring Da Peng, Mabel Yuan and Liu Yan. The film also features Jean-Claude Van Damme. The plot follows the story of a poor street food vendor (Da Peng) who gains superpowers from his pancakes (jian bing). The film was a commercial success.

== Plot ==
Da Peng plays a version of himself in the film. Da Peng has gained fame and fortune through his hit web TV series, Diors Man, and now wants to propose to his fiancée, Amber Kuo. In order to buy a ten million dollar ring for her, Da Peng accepts a deal from gangster boss Brother Hai, who wants Da Peng to make a movie starring Brother Hai's girlfriend, an actress named Du Xiaoxiao. Da Peng successfully buys the ten million dollar ring, but before he manages to propose, he gets involved in a bar fight. The resulting scandal not only costs him his reputation and job, it also causes him to lose the ring. After hearing the news, Amber breaks up with him as well. Brother Hai chases Da Peng, demanding his money back. Da Peng saves himself by explaining that he has already contacted Du Xiaoxiao and is using the ten million dollars for production. Pleased with this news, Brother Hai lets him off, on the condition that this movie is successfully made.

Now forced to make the movie, Da Peng recruits Xiaoxiao, his personal assistant Pan, background actor Ma Tao and paparazzi photographer Hu. Da Peng tells them about the script he wrote, named "Jian Bing Man" (Pancake Man). The titular character is a superhero who fights against a large global crime organization that has kidnapped many people, including his beloved. Because he does not actually have money to hire any well-known actors, Da Peng sets various actors up in situations resembling the scenarios in the script, and gets them to unknowingly act out his story, all while secretly filming them. He successfully shoots scenes with many actors like Sandra Ng, Eric Tsang, Yue Yunpeng and Deng Chao, all of them oblivious to their plot. As the filming progresses, Da Peng reveals to his crew that "Jian Bing Man" is not just a simple film, but a story based on his childhood dream of becoming a superhero. Motivated by his dedication, the crew continue with filming and vow to make this movie a success.

Da Peng manages to save his reputation by bravely stopping an armed robbery, mistaking it for a scene of his film. He also finds the missing ring and uses it to pay off his debt to Brother Hai. Da Peng's former entertainment company contacts him and wishes to hire him again, but warns him against continuing to shoot "Jian Bing Man". Because he did not receive consent from any of the actors that were secretly filmed, Da Peng will face serious lawsuits if he releases the film for commercial purposes. Da Peng decides to cease all production of the film and disband the crew. The film crew are extremely disappointed by his decision, and accuse him of cowardice. Da Peng is uncertain of what he should do, but is encouraged by his best friend Liu Yan to continue pursuing his dream.

Da Peng successfully finishes filming "Jian Bing Man" with the help of various celebrities, include several additional stars like Jean-Claude Van Damme, Ekin Cheung and Jordan Chan, who were idols that his crew dreamed of meeting. The various celebrities all congratulate Da Peng on his movie, and tells him that although the movie cannot be screened, he can rewrite it into new film about the making of this movie, and if he was to do that, the celebrities would be happy to work with him again.

== Cast ==
- Da Peng as himself
- Mabel Yuan as Du Xiaoxiao
- Liu Yan as herself
- Sandra Ng as herself
- Eric Tsang as himself
- Yue Yunpeng as himself
- Yi Yunhe as Ma Tao
- Liang Chao as Wang Hai
- Pan Binlong as himself
- Cui Zhijia as "Bearded" Hu
- Qiao Shan as himself
- Deng Chao as himself
- Amber Kuo as Da Peng's fiancee
- Jean-Claude Van Damme as himself
- Xiaoshenyang as himself
- Song Xiaobao as himself
- Liu Xiaoguang as himself
- Wang Xiaoli as himself
- Chen Sicheng as himself
- Lin Gengxin as himself
- Chen Yufan as himself
- Cannon Hu as himself
- Han Han as himself
- Chen He as himself
- Zheng Kai as himself
- Bao Bei'er as himself
- Ekin Cheng as himself
- Jordan Chan as himself
- Michael Tse as himself
- Jerry Lamb as himself

== Reception ==
=== Box office ===
The film earned CN¥1.16 billion at the Chinese box office.

=== Critical response ===
Film critic Avi Offer of The NYC Movie Guru gave the film a score of 8/10, calling it "A refreshing, fun, imaginative and amusing comedy worth seeing with a large audience".
