= Du Juan =

Chinese actress, model, and former ballet dancer

- 杜鹃
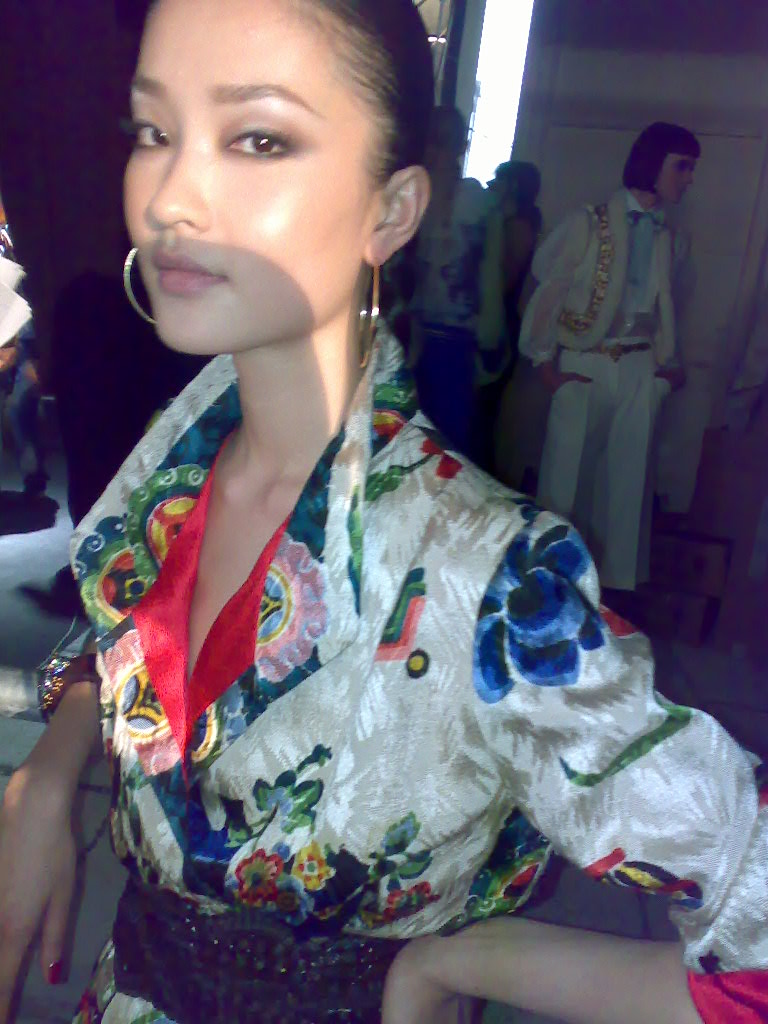
- Du Juan at Roberto Cavalli
- Born: September 15, 1982 (age 44); Shanghai, China
- Occupations: Actress, model, ballet dancer
- Modeling information
- Height: 5 ft 11 in (1.80 m)
- Hair color: Black
- Eye color: Brown
- Agency: IMG Models (New York, Paris, London, Sydney)

Du Juan (simplified Chinese: 杜鹃; traditional Chinese: 杜鵑; pinyin: Dù Juān; born September 15, 1982, in Shanghai, China) is a Chinese actress, model, and former ballet dancer. She was the first East Asian model to be on the cover of Vogue Paris and has appeared on the cover of Vogue China a record 18 times, more than any other model or celebrity.

== Biography ==
=== Early life ===
The only child of architect parents, Du had originally pursued a career in classical ballet, training at the prestigious Shanghai Theatre Academy for nine years. She eventually grew too tall to find a suitable dance partner, being over six feet while en pointe. Her name literally refers to the rhododendron flower.

=== Modelling career ===
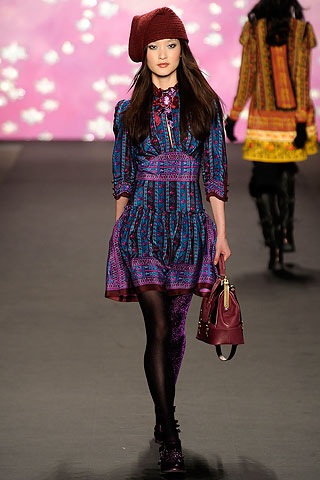
Du Juan walks the Anna Sui FW 2009 show.

A former Ford Supermodel of the World runner-up, Du made her runway debut in spring 2006, walking for prominent designers such as Valentino (opening and closing his bridal show), Jean-Paul Gaultier, Roberto Cavalli and Chanel.

In 2005 Mario Testino photographed her for the cover of Vogue Paris, along with Australian model Gemma Ward, becoming the first ever Asian cover-model. This led to a flurry of ad campaigns for Louis Vuitton, Roberto Cavalli, Gap, Swarovski, United Colors of Benetton, and Yves St. Laurent. With multiple bookings being a rare accomplishment, particularly for a new face, Style.com the online home of Vogue and W magazine, declared her one of the top ten models to watch for the fall 2006 season. She was featured on the cover of the premier issue of Vogue China, once again alongside Gemma Ward, and has since become a fixture in its pages, appearing in almost one editorial per issue since its launch in 2005. Du appeared on the cover of the 2006 Time style and design issue alongside fellow model Coco Rocha, and was one of the models featured in the 2008 Pirelli Calendar, shot in her native Shanghai.

Du peaked at number 14 on model ranking site Models.com and in recent seasons has been featured in advertisement campaigns for Giorgio Armani, Esprit, Anna Sui, Uniqlo, David Yurman and Yue Sai, a Chinese expansion of L'Oréal.

Du has appeared in editorials for Allure, Harper's Bazaar, Elle, V, i-D and the Italian, American, Chinese, French, Taiwanese, Korean, and British editions of Vogue. Du has also modelled for the cover of the Chinese, Hong Kong and Singaporean editions of Elle, Chinese and Singaporean Harper's Bazaar and Chinese Numéro.

She appeared in a music video for Cantopop singer Jacky Cheung's "Double Trouble" as Cheung's love interest in 2010.

=== Acting career ===
Du Juan made her acting debut in the American Dreams in China, a highly-grossing film directed by Peter Chan in which she played Su Mei, the only female role in the movie. The movie earned her the nominations in 33rd Hong Kong Film Awards for Best Supporting Actress and Best New Performer.

== Personal life ==
Her favorite fashion designer is Alber Elbaz of Lanvin.

Her given name, Juan (鵑) means "cuckoo" in Chinese. However, together with her surname, her full name could mean either "cuckoo" or "rhododendron".

In 2009, Du released a two-piece cosmetic line inspired by a shoot with photographer Camilla Akrans which included 24-carat gold body sparkle. In the same year, Chinese model agency New Silk Road sued Du Juan for US$659,000 for an alleged breach of contract.

== Filmography ==
Film
Year	Title	Role	Notes
2012	Déjà Vu		short film
2013	American Dreams in China	Su Mei	
2015	Lost in Hong Kong		
2016	New York New York		
2016	I Belonged to You		
2016	See You Tomorrow		
2017	Wine Wars		
2018	Europe Raiders	Sophie	
2019	Whisper of Silent Body		
2019	Lost in Love		
2023	Where the Wind Blows		

Television series
Year	Title	Role	Notes
2023	Blossoms Shanghai	Xue Zhi	
