= See You Tomorrow (2016 film) =

- Promotional poster
- Traditional Chinese: 擺渡人
- Simplified Chinese: 摆渡人
- Hanyu Pinyin: Baǐdù Rén
- Directed by: Zhang Jiajia
- Written by: Wong Kar-wai; Zhang Jiajia
- Based on: Passing From Your World by Zhang Jiajia
- Produced by: Wong Kar-wai; Jacky Pang
- Starring: Tony Leung Chiu-wai; Takeshi Kaneshiro; Angelababy; Eason Chan; Sandrine Pinna
- Cinematography: Cao Yu; Peter Pau
- Edited by: David Wu
- Music by: Nathaniel Méchaly
- Production company: Alibaba Pictures
- Distributed by: Jet Tone Films; Alibaba Pictures
- Release date: December 23, 2016
- Running time: 128 minutes
- Countries: China; Hong Kong
- Languages: Mandarin; Cantonese
- Box office: US$69.3 million

See You Tomorrow (simplified Chinese: 摆渡人; traditional Chinese: 擺渡人) is a 2016 romantic comedy film directed by Chinese writer Zhang Jiajia in his directorial debut and produced and written by Wong Kar-wai with Alibaba Pictures. A co-production between China and Hong Kong, it is based loosely on Zhang's own best-selling book Passing From Your World in the collection I Belonged to You. It stars Tony Leung Chiu-wai, Takeshi Kaneshiro and singer and actress Angelababy. Filming started in July 2015. It was released in China by Alibaba Pictures on December 23, 2016.

== Plot ==
A bar owner helps lonely people through their heartbreaks and takes a radio DJ under his wing.

== Cast ==
- Tony Leung Chiu-wai as Chen Mo
- Takeshi Kaneshiro as Guan Chun
- Angelababy as Xiao Yu
- Eason Chan as Ma Li
  - Lu Han as young Ma Li
- Sandrine Pinna as Mao Mao
- Du Juan ad He Muzi
- Lynn Hung as Jiang Jie
- Da Peng
- Ma Su as A Sao
- Cui Zhijia
- Jia Ling
- Li Yuchun
- Ko Chia-yen as Bar patron

== Reception ==
The film grossed CN¥287 million (US$40 million) on its opening weekend in China. As of December 22, 2016, it grossed US$69.3 million.

Reviews of the film were largely negative, causing the film to open below local forecast numbers. Maggie Lee of Variety called the film "an over-the-top and indigestible romantic comedy produced and co-scripted by Wong Kar-wai lacking any of the auteur's usual finesse". Clarence Tsui of The Hollywood Reporter said that the film is an "impermeable melange of shapeless storytelling, rehashed gags, vacuous relationships and painfully over-the-top performances from its usually top-notch cast".

== Awards and nominations ==
Year	Award	Category	Recipient	Result	Citation(s)
2017	11th Asian Film Awards	Best Supporting Actress	Lynn Hung	Nominated	
2017	11th Asian Film Awards	Best Production Designer	Alfred Yau	Nominated	
2017	11th Asian Film Awards	Best Visual Effects	Perry Kain, Johnny Lin and Thomas Reppen	Nominated	
2017	11th Asian Film Awards	Best Costume Designer	William Chang and Cheung Siu-hong	Nominated	
2017	36th Hong Kong Film Awards	Best Cinematography	Peter Pau and Cao Yu	Won	
2017	36th Hong Kong Film Awards	Best Film Editing	David Wu	Nominated	
2017	36th Hong Kong Film Awards	Best Art Direction	Alfred Yau	Nominated	
2017	36th Hong Kong Film Awards	Best Costume & Make-up Design	William Chang and Cheung Siu-hong	Nominated	
2017	36th Hong Kong Film Awards	Best Sound Design	Robert Mackenzie	Nominated	
2017	36th Hong Kong Film Awards	Best Original Film Score	Nathaniel Méchaly	Nominated	
2017	36th Hong Kong Film Awards	Best Original Film Song	"Keep Me By Your Side"; Composer and lyrics: Tang Hanxiao; Performer: Eason Chan	Nominated	
2017	23rd Hong Kong Film Critics Society Award	Films of Merit	See You Tomorrow	Won	
2017	23rd Hong Kong Film Critics Society Award	Best Actress	Sandrine Pinna	Nominated	
2017	8th Golden Broom Awards	Most Disappointing Film	See You Tomorrow	Won	
2017	8th Golden Broom Awards	Most Disappointing New Director	Zhang Jiajia	Won	
2017	8th Golden Broom Awards	Most Disappointing Screen Writer	Zhang Jiajia	Won	
2017	54th Golden Horse Awards	Best Leading Actor	Takeshi Kaneshiro	Nominated	
2017	54th Golden Horse Awards	Best Adapted Screenplay	Wong Kar-wai and Zhang Jiajia	Nominated	
2017	54th Golden Horse Awards	Best Cinematography	Peter Pau and Cao Yu	Nominated	
2017	54th Golden Horse Awards	Best Visual Effects	Johnny Lin, Perry Kain and Thomas Reppen	Won	
2017	54th Golden Horse Awards	Best Art Direction	Alfred Yau	Won	
2017	54th Golden Horse Awards	Best Makeup & Costume Design	William Chang and Cheung Siu-hong	Won	
2017	54th Golden Horse Awards	Best Original Film Song	"Keep Me By Your Side"; Composer and lyrics: Tang Hanxiao; Performer: Eason Chan	Nominated	
2017	2nd Golden Screen Awards	Best Cinematography	Peter Pau and Cao Yu	Won	
2017	2nd Golden Screen Awards	Best Visual Effects	Johnny Lin, Perry Kain and Thomas Reppen	Won	
