= Zhang Qiang (singer) =

- Born: 18 December 1967 (age 58); Beijing, China
- Occupation: singer-songwriter
- Years active: 1984–present
- Children: Liang Jing, b. 3 January 1988 (age 38); Qiang Xun, b. 27 May 2005 (age 21)

Chinese name
Transcriptions
Standard Mandarin
- Hanyu Pinyin: Zhāng Qiáng
Yue: Cantonese
- Jyutping: Zoeng1 Coeng4
- Musical career
- Also known as: Rose Zhang
- Origin: Beijing
- Genres: C-pop, mandopop, C-rock, electronic
- Labels: Yunnan Audiovisual Press, Modern Sky, China Youth Production, Guangxi Arts and Culture, Guangxi Publishing

Zhang Qiang (Chinese: 张蔷; born 1967), also known as Rose Zhang, is a Chinese singer who started her career in the mid-1980s. She is known as the Chinese Disco Queen because of her covers of western disco songs in her early period. She is also noted for being maybe the first Mainland Chinese pop singer in a time when foreign musical influences were limited, and when the artists from Taiwan and Hong Kong were the most popular in China.

== Biography ==
=== First years ===
Zhang was born in 1967, at the beginning of the Cultural Revolution. Her mother was a violin player for the Chinese Philharmonic Orchestra. She started learning to play the violin and piano from the age of 5. Despite her classic musical influences, she was mainly fascinated by pop and disco music, two music styles that at first, where banned in the PRC, although in the 1980s, thanks to the reform and opening, those styles started entering in China. In these years, Taiwanese and Hong Kong singers such as Teresa Teng were prominent, and fascinated the young people.

When Zhang was a student, she usually sang with a portable recorder when she returned from the school, then, she managed to find a South Korean radio station which played also western music. That is how she discovered artists such as The Beatles and Michael Jackson of whom she did not know before, and that would turn into her main influence.

When she was 18, she left the school and started singing professionally. Although her mother did not like her career choice. She left Beijing and moved temporarily to Guangzhou, where she found a job as a singer in a café. At first, she wanted to stay there, but finally a little record label from Kunming was the first interested in her voice. Yunnan Audiovisual Press, gave a positive response to Zhang's voice recordings and in 1985, she managed to release her debut album. The chief of that little company, said that Zhang had a very strong voice, and that she had an enormous potential. From then on, she would release 20 studio albums in the next two years.

=== Career ===
Tokyo Nights, Zhang's first cover album, was released in early 1985. It is calculated that this album sold over a million copies in China. Zhang was initially expected to earn 800 yuan a month. Anyway, due to the high sales of this album, her salary was increased to 1,400 yuan, much more than the salary of her own mother who only got a salary of 70 yuan in her job as a state musician.

Zhang covered many famous songs, she covered a wide range of styles including, Pop, Disco, Techno-Pop, Rock and Chinese traditional music. Anyway, she felt more comfortable performing pop and disco tracks. She preferred cheerful "happy" songs and urban love songs. That preference could also be seen in the image of the singer, her visual looks were very modern compared to the image sponsored by the communism. Her hair and her colorful clothes were qualified as vulgar by the most conservatives, but considered as fresh by the youth. She followed the trends of the '80s both musically and visually, which helped to make her popular.

In the next two-year, Zhang sold more than 20 million copies with her uncountable cover albums. Although, her popularity was widespread, she managed to be famous without the help of marketing. Her face could be seen nowhere in the media, only the covers of her albums featured photos of her, and the only information her fans could find, were nothing else than her releases. It is rumored that despite this enormous disadvantage, Zhang outsold Teresa Teng in 1986.

From 1988 to 1992, when she gave birth to her first child, when she was 19, she started releasing only one album per year.

=== Momentary retirement ===
In 1987, the Mainland Chinese music industry was still underdeveloped. The release of cover albums was the only way available for the Mainland Chinese new singers to perform music. In this year, Zhang started feeling that she could not cover more songs because she already had covered too many. Despite the high amount of money she earned thanks to her albums, Zhang felt tired, and wanting to do something new. She started thinking about composing original songs, but the publishers were not interested in that. Apart from that, in 1987, she went to Australia to study and from 1988 to 1992, she only recorded one album per year. After that, she decided to retire.

During that retirement, Zhang, took care of her family and in 1992, she got married in Hong Kong. She stayed in silence from then, to 1996.

=== Return ===
In 1996 after divorcing, Zhang returned to music. In the middle 1990s, the Mainland Chinese entertainment industry was starting to take off. Singers such as Na Ying, Sun Nan, Sun Yue and Yang Yuying were starting to make a name in the entertainment world and some famous singers such as Faye Wong, had returned to the mainland, working with local producers such as Zhang Yadong. Zhang reappeared with a more mature voice, with a new style and a darker image. Her 1996 album entitled "Let's Rock" was characterised by a Pop-Rock style and a harder sound compared to her previous works. It was also an important release for her because for first time in her career, all the songs were original. From then on, she started composing her own tracks.

In 1997, the singer released "Lonely habits" another studio album with all the songs written by herself. This album discovered a new creative face of Zhang because for first time, it included sad songs. Most of the tracks were down tempo songs very different from what she did before, showing her vocal and creative maturity as a singer. She also included a promotional video for the title track of the album.

After a short period of silence in 2001, Zhang released her 30th album. She was finally recognised as an important part of the Mainland Chinese Mandopop movement. In fact, she was invited, for first time, to perform in the CCTV studios. It was the first time Zhang gave a live performance for TV.

Creatively, Zhang started experimenting with new styles such as electronic music. She got back to her usual cheerful style and songs that would characterise her following releases.

== Studio albums ==
Year	Title	Label	Record Company
1985	Tokyo Night (东京之夜)	Yunying (雲鶯)	Yunnan Audiovisual Press (云南音像出版社)
1985	Shy Girl (害羞的女孩)	Yunying (雲鶯)	Yunnan Audiovisual Press (云南音像出版社)
1985	Marvellous Youth (青春多美妙)	CBGAC	China BeiGuang Audio-Visual Art Co.(中国北光声像艺术公司)
1985	Love River (相思河畔)	CTAVPC	China Tourism Audio-Visual Publication Corporation (中国旅游声像出版公司)
1985	Rainy Night in Tokyo (雨夜东京 - 東京も今夜雨だ)	Canniao (参鸟)	Changbaishan Audiovisual Press (长白山音像出版社)
1986	Saturday / Please Stay (星期六/请留下来)	SCYX / Yansheng (燕声)	Sichuan Audiovisual Press (四川音像出版社) / Beijing Audiovisual Company(北京音像出版公司)
1986	That Night (那天晚上)	Xingxing (星星)	Shanxi Audiovisual Press (山西音像出版社)
1986	I hope that tomorrow... (希望在明天)	Bailing (百灵)	Inner Mongolia Audiovisual Press (内蒙古音像出版社)
1986	Beautiful day (美丽的一天)	Yunying (雲鶯)	Yunnan Audiovisual Press (云南音像出版社)
1986	Once again, spring comes (再来一次春天)	Xingxing (星星)	Shanxi Audiovisual Press (山西音像出版社)
1986	Naughty girl (淘气女孩)	Mount Tai (泰山)	Qilu Audiovisual Press (齐鲁音像出版社)
1986	Fly To You (飞向你)	Xingxing (星星)	Shanxi Audiovisual Press (山西音像出版社)
1986	Midnight street (午夜街头)	Bailing (百灵)	Inner Mongolia Audiovisual Press (内蒙古音像出版社)
1986	Golden dream (金色梦幻)	Dongfang (東方)	Beiguo Audiovisual Press (北国音像出版社)
1986	I rejoyce (尽情欢乐)	SCYX	Sichuan Audiovisual Press (四川音像出版社)
1986	Golden Hits/Newest Hits (金曲联唱/最新精曲)	Mount Tai (泰山)	Qilu Audiovisual Press (齐鲁音像出版社)
1987	Leaving Elegantly (潇洒地走)	Diecai (疊彩)	Guangxi National Audiovisual Art Company (广西民族声像艺术公司)
1987	I love you forever (爱你永远)	CTAVPC	China Tourism Audio-Visual Publication Corporation (中国旅游声像出版公司)
1987	Famous songs vol I (成名金曲)	Yunying (雲鶯)	Yunnan Audiovisual Press (云南音像出版社)
1988	Famous songs vol II (成名金曲OK2)	Yunying (雲鶯)	Yunnan Audiovisual Press (云南音像出版社)
1988	From Australia (来自澳洲的张蔷)	Mount Tai (泰山)	Qilu Audiovisual Press (齐鲁音像出版社)
1989	Golden Queen (金曲女皇)		中国广播电视出版社
1990	More songs (唱不完的歌)	CTAVPC	China Tourism Audio-Visual Publication Corporation (中国旅游声像出版公司)
1991	Love is my treasure (珍重我的爱)		延边音像出版社
1992	Curved moon (弯弯的月亮)		北京电影制片厂录音录像公司
1996	Let's Rock (尽情摇摆)	Xingxing (星星)	Shanxi Audiovisual Press (山西音像出版社)
1997	Lonely habits (习惯寂寞)		中华文艺音像联合出版社
2001	Enjoy the flight (尽情飞扬)		中新音像出版社/普罗之声制作
2002	A winter coffee (冬天的咖啡)		中国青少年音像出版社
2006	I wait for your love (我希望在你的爱情里)		
2013	No Question Of Disco (别再问我什么是迪斯科)	Modern Sky (摩登天空)	
