= Yuan Shanshan =

Chinese actress and singer

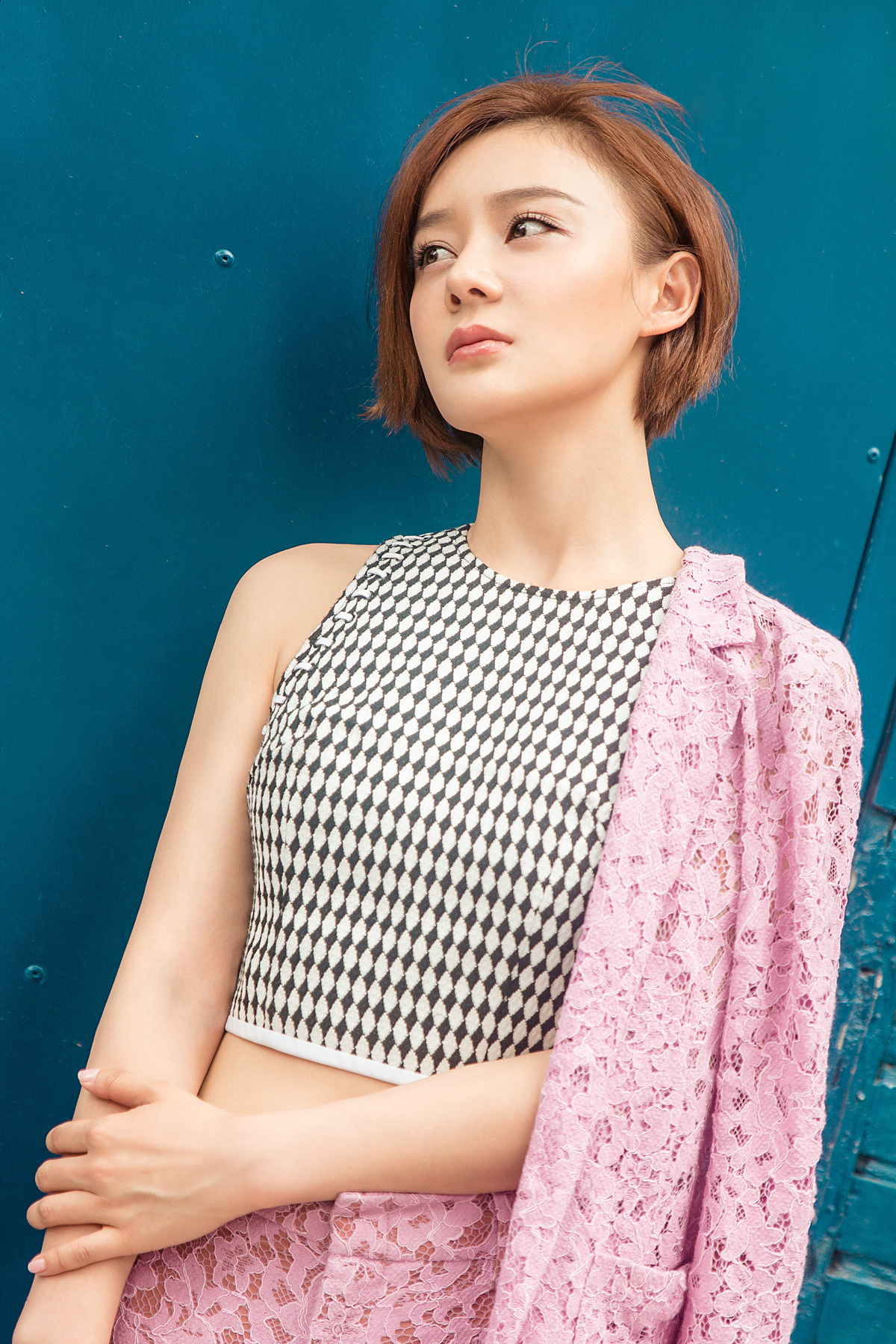
- Yuan in 2018
- Born: February 22, 1987 (age 39); Xiangcheng District, Xiangfan, Hubei, China
- Other name: Mabel Yuan
- Education: Beijing Film Academy
- Occupations: Actress; Singer
- Years active: 2008–present
- Agent: Huanyu Film

Chinese name
- Chinese: 袁姗姗
Transcriptions
Standard Mandarin
- Hanyu Pinyin: Yuán Shānshān

Yuan Shanshan (Chinese: 袁姗姗, born 22 February 1987) also known as Mabel Yuan is a Chinese actress and singer. She is noted for her roles as in the Gong series: Palace II (2012) and Palace III (2013); as well as Swordsman (2013) and Jian Bing Man (2015).

== Early life and education ==
Yuan Shanshan was born in a wealthy and highly educated family, to civil servant parents, in Xiangcheng District of Xiangyang city, Hubei province on February 22, 1987. At the age of 6, she started to play the violin.

In 2005, she attended Beijing Film Academy from which she graduated in 2009.

== Career ==
Yuan made her acting debut in A House's Maid in 2010, and was praised by co-star Zhao Wenxuan for her performance.

Yuan Shanshan first came to the attention of the audience when she played a supporting role in the historical television series Qin Xianglian. Under her co-star Leanne Liu's recommendation, she then signed with Yu Zheng's Studio. After guest-starring in Palace, Yuan then got the role of Empress Xiaoshengxian in second installment of Yu Zheng's 'Gong' series; which propelled Yuan to fame and earned her a Breakthrough Improvement award.

Thereafter Yuan starred in several productions by Yu Zheng such as Beauty Without Tears (2012), the third installment of Yu Zheng's 'Beauty' series; Beauty of the Emperor (2012); Swordsman (2013), adapted from Jin Yong's wuxia novel The Smiling, Proud Wanderer; and Palace 3: The Lost Daughter (2014), the sequel of Palace II — all of the series were popular during their run and led to increased recognition for Yuan. She is also known for her role in the period romantic drama Love in Spring (2013). However despite her rising popularity, Yuan faced several backlash by haters on Weibo in regards to her miscast, as the role of Ren Yingying in Swordsman.

In 2015, Yuan starred in the superhero parody film Jian Bing Man, which was a box office success and broke ten million admissions. Yuan won the Most Powerful New Actress award at the Weibo Movie Awards Night. She next starred in the South Korean-Chinese romantic comedy film So I Married an Anti-fan and recorded a duet with her co-star Park Chan-yeol from boy band Exo. For the film, Yuan won the Most Popular Actress award at the Chinese American Film Festival.

== Filmography ==
=== Film ===
Year	English title	Chinese title	Role	Notes/Ref.
2008		戏院凶座	Shangguan Yan	
2008	The Secret of Quail-Roost	女生宿舍的秘密	Bo Mei	
2008	The Secret of Quail-Roost 2	女生宿舍的秘密2	Bo Mei	
2010	Lover Eternal	巫山梦	Ji Anran	
2014	One Day	有一天	Su Xiaomei	
2015	Jian Bing Man	煎饼侠	Du Xiaoxiao	
2016	So I Married an Anti-fan	所以，我和黑粉结婚了	Fang Miao Miao / Lee Geun-yeong	
2017	Revenge for Love	疯岳撬佳人	Tian Meng	
2017	City of Rock	缝纫机乐队		Cameo
2018	Lobster Cop	龙虾刑警		
2019	Little Q	小Q		
2019	Youthful China in the Headlines	头条里的青春中国		Short film

=== Television series ===
Year	English title	Chinese title	Role	Notes/Ref.
2009	My Fool Wife	我的傻瓜老婆	Lin Xiaoxiao	
2010	A House's Maid	大屋下的丫鬟	Ju	
2010	No.1 Xiaoxiang Road	潇湘路一号	Jin Di	
2010	The Vigilantes in Masks	怪侠一枝梅	Bing Bing	
2011	The Wild Duck	野鸭子	Fang Tingting	
2011	Palace	宫锁心玉	Ru Bing	
2011	Qin Xianglian	秦香莲	Qin Xianglian	
2011	Hidden Intentions	被遗弃的秘密	Cui Shanshan	
2012	Palace II	宫锁珠帘	Empress Xiaoshengxian	
2012	Allure Snow	倾城雪	Xu Jin	
2012	Beauties of the Emperor	王的女人	Consort Yu, called by the name "Yu Miaoge" in this series	
2012	In Love with Power	山河恋·美人无泪	Empress Dowager Xiaozhuang	
2013	Swordsman	笑傲江湖	Ren Yingying	
2013	Happiness Radiates	幸福绽放	Xia Fei	
2013	The Biography of Princess Shisan	十三格格新传	Princess Shisan	
2013	Love in Spring	爱在春天	Yao Xiaodie	
2013	Crazy for Palace	我为宫狂	Concubine Xi	
2013	Hunt Wolf	猎天狼	Sun Xiaoyu	
2014	Home with a Pregnant Woman	家有喜妇	Ni Hao	
2014	Palace 3: The Lost Daughter	宫锁连城	Song Liancheng	
2014	Cosmetology High	美人制造	Princess Yongning	
2015	City of Angels	天使的城	Guan Shasha	
2015	Murong Jin	芙蓉锦	He Lan	
2015	Tour Between Two Lovers	向幸福出发	Ye Lin	
2015	The Nanny Man	我爱男保姆	Lu Qing	
2016	Love is So Beautiful	恋爱真美	Xu Xinlin	
2017	Above the Clouds	云巅之上	Jian Xi	
2017	The Times We Had	国民大生活	Lulu	
2019	National Treasure's Extraordinary Journey	国宝奇旅	Zhou Ruosi	
2019	The Legendary Tavern	老酒馆		Cameo
TBA	Pursuit of True Love	米露露求爱记	Mi Lulu	
TBA	Great Age	大时代	Yao Gun	
TBA	Bei Jing Yi Nan	北京以南		
TBA	New Face	焕脸	Wang Xiaoai	
TBA	A Land So Rich in Beauty	江山如此多娇	Sha Ou	

== Discography ==
=== Singles ===
Year	English title	Chinese title	Album	Notes
2012	"No Tears"	无泪	Beauty Without Tears OST	with Han Dong
2012	"Promise"	承诺	Beauty Without Tears OST	
2012	"Song of Love Sickness"	相思曲	Palace II OST	
2013	"Awakened"	觉悟	Swordsman OST	
2013	"Love Me"	爱我	Swordsman OST	
2013	"Love's Delivery"	爱的传颂	Love of Spring OST	
2013	"I Have a Date With Spring"	我和春天有个约会	Love of Spring OST	
2013	"Won't Complain"	不怨	Palace 3: The Lost Daughter OST	
2013	"Loneliness"	寂寞红	Palace 3: The Lost Daughter OST	
2015	"Stubborn"	倔强	—N/a	
2015	"End of Love"	绝恋	Furong Jin OST	
2015	"New Student"	新生	—N/a	theme song of Grade One Freshman
2016	"I Hate You"		So I Married An Anti-fan OST	with Park Chan-yeol
2016	"Having You is Enough"	有你就足够	So I Married An Anti-fan OST	

== Awards and nominations ==
Year	Nominated work	Award	Category	Result	Ref.
2016	So I Married An Anti-fan	Chinese American Film Festival	Most Popular Actress	Won	
2017	"I Hate You"	5th YinYueTai VChart Awards	Best Collaboration (with Park Chanyeol)	Won	
2019	6th The Actors of China Award Ceremony	Best Actress (Emerald Category)	National Treasure's Extraordinary Journey	Nominated	
