= Dong Chengpeng =

Chinese comedian and filmmaker (born 1982)

Da Peng
- 大鹏
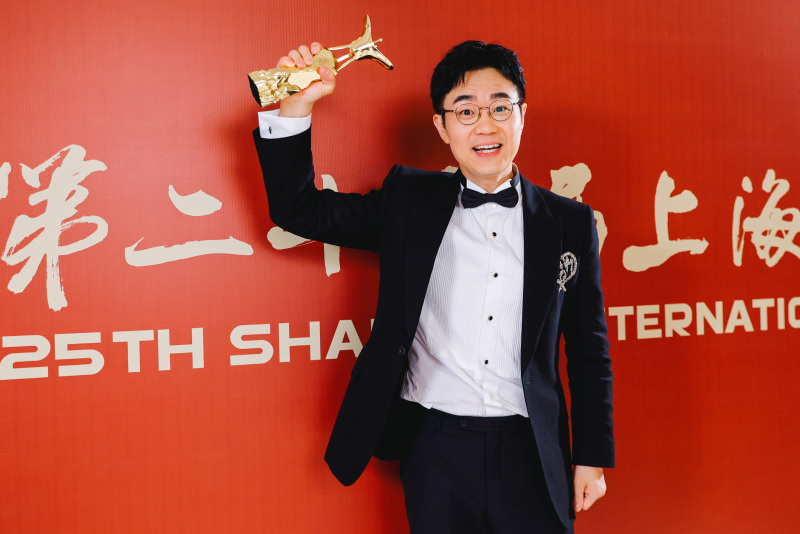
- Dong at the 2023 Shanghai International Film Festival
- Born: Dong Chengpeng; January 12, 1982 (age 44); Ji'an, Jilin, China
- Education: Jilin Architecture University
- Occupations: Actor; film director; screenwriter; film producer
- Years active: 2004–present
- Awards: Golden Horse Awards – Best Live Action Short Film Award; 2018 A Final Reunion; Golden Goblet Awards – Best Actor; 2023 Dust to Dust

Dong Chengpeng (simplified Chinese: 董成鹏; traditional Chinese: 董成鵬; born January 12, 1982), better known by his stage name Da Peng, is a Chinese host, comedian, actor, and filmmaker, known for his grassroots-style comedy.

Da Peng joined Sohu in 2004, where he primarily hosted and produced web-based talk shows. In 2010, he became the 53rd disciple of Zhao Benshan. He drew wide attention in 2012 when Conan O'Brien accused his web show Da Peng Debade of copying the opening animation of Conan. That same year, Da Peng transitioned from hosting to acting and directing with the Knallerfrauen-inspired web show Diors Man (2012–2015). Its Internet popularity paved the way for his successful feature-film directorial debut Pancake Man (2015), after which he shifted his focus to cinema and resigned from Sohu in 2018. Da Peng's notable directorial works include City of Rock (2017), A Final Reunion (2018), which won the 55th Golden Horse Award for Best Live Action Short Film and was later expanded into The Reunions (2020), One and Only (2023), and The Lychee Road (2025), many of which he also starred in. His other acting credits include Johnny Keep Walking! (2023) and Dust to Dust (2023).

== Early life and education ==
Da Peng was born on January 12, 1982, in Ji'an City, Jilin. His father was a machine factory worker and his mother was an actress in a Ping opera troupe. He admired the Hong Kong band Beyond and formed his own band in high school. Later, he was enrolled in the School of Management at Jilin Architecture University, majoring in engineering management.

== Career ==
=== 2004–2014 ===
In May 2004, Da Peng joined Sohu as the host of the celebrity talk show "INSTAR". In 2007, he hosted the talk show "Da Peng Yakking". In January 2009, he played the lead role in the film Radish Warrior.

On February 14, he joined the love story film Contract about Status Interchange. In May, he hosted an entertainment information program from Sohu called "Songs Be Unfit for My Halls" with Aya.

In 2012, he directed the mini comedy "Diors Man". In the same year, he joined the show "Your Face Sounds Familiar", and became its champion. In 2013, he directed and starred in "Diors Man 2".

In January 2014, he headlined the film Hello Babies. Later, he joined the CCTV New Year's Gala to perform a skit "Disturbing" with Cai Ming and Yue Yunpeng. In 2013, he directed and starred in "Diors Man 3".

=== 2015–2017 ===
On June 20, 2015, the film Pancake Man, which he directed and starred in, won 'Best New Director' and 'Best New Actor' awards at the 18th Shanghai International Film Festival.

In October, he was selected to participate in the "Sino-American Film Talent Exchange Program", jointly initiated by the Motion Picture Association of America and China's SAPPRFT in 2013, and was sent to study at Paramount Pictures.

In November, he received the Outstanding Chinese Young Director Award at the 11th Chinese American Film Festival in Los Angeles. On December 4, he joined the sci-fi comedy Impossible.

In 2016, he played a starring role in the film The Thousand Faces of Dunjia. Then, he acted in Feng Xiaogang's movie I Am Not Madame Bovary. He was nominated for the Best Supporting Actor at the 11th Asian Film Awards for this movie.

In January 2017, he played a role in the movie Journey to the West: The Demons Strike Back. In July, he took a starring role in the movie Father and Son. On September 29, the film he directed, City of Rock, was released.

=== 2018–present ===
In 2018, he won the Golden Horse Award for Best Live Action Short Film for his film A Final Reunion. In July 2020, his film The Reunions was shortlisted for the Golden Goblet Award for Best Film in the main competition of the 23rd Shanghai International Film Festival. In November, he was nominated for the Golden Rooster Award for Best Actor for the movie My Dear Liar.

In January 2021, his third directorial film, The Last Reunion, was screened. On February 12, he acted in the movie Detective Chinatown 3. On March 5, he appeared in the film The Eleventh Chapter, directed by Chen Jianbin.

On September 9, he was cast in the lead role in the web series "Double Detective". In January 2023, he took the lead role in the film Hidden Blade. On March 10, the movie Post Truth, which he directed and starred in, was launched.

In July, the Asian Games-themed film One and Only, which he directed, was shown in theaters. On September 9, he headlined the movie Dust to Dust. He headed the cast of Johnny Keep Walking!, which hit theaters on December 29.

In December, he served as a jury member for the Golden Coconut Awards at the 5th Hainan Island International Film Festival. On January 12, 2024, the IMAX space-themed science fiction film Asteroid Hunter, narrated by him, was screened in China.

In January, he was nominated for Best Actor at the 30th Hong Kong Film Critics Society Awards for his role in Dust to Dust. On February 6, the film earned him a nomination for Best Actor at the 42nd Hong Kong Film Awards.

On March 21, Da Peng served as one of the official voices for the Chinese version of The Boy and the Heron, a Japanese animated fantasy film written and directed by Hayao Miyazaki. On April 3 of the same year, the film was released in China.

== Published books ==
- Laughing Out Loud on Tough Days. Beijing United Publishing Company. 2013. ISBN 978-7-5502-2375-2.
- Be Your Own Hero First. Beijing United Publishing Company. 2015. ISBN 978-7-5502-5502-9.
- The Road of Dreams. Beijing United Publishing Company. 2017. ISBN 978-7-5596-0932-8.
