= So I Married an Anti-fan (novel) =

2010 South Korean novel by Kim Eun-jung

- Cover art of the 1st edition (2010) by Terrace Book
- Author: Kim Eun-jung
- Original title: 그래서 나는 안티팬과 결혼했다
- Language: Korean
- Genre: Romantic comedy
- Publisher: Terrace Book
- Publication date: September 27, 2010
- Publication place: South Korea
- Media type: Print
- Pages: 496 (1st edition, 2010)
- ISBN: 978-8-994-30003-0

So I Married an Anti-fan (Note: The title is also translated as So I Married the Anti-fan.) (Korean: 그래서 나는 안티팬과 결혼했다; RR: Geuraeseo naneun antipaen-gwa gyeolhonhaetda) (Note: pron. [kɯɾɛsʰʌ̹ na̠nɯn a̠ntʰipʰɛnɡwa̠ kjʌ̹ɾβo̞nɦɛt̚t͈a̠]) is a South Korean web novel written by Kim Eun-jung, first published on September 27, 2010, and was reissued as a two-part full-length version on February 6, 2016. Exploring the nature of stardom and fandom culture in the K-pop scene, the novel centers on the unlikely relationship between a magazine reporter and a famous idol of whom the former became an ardent anti-fan after an eventful encounter.

== Characters ==
=== Main ===
- Lee Geun-young
- Hoo Joon

=== Supporting ===
- Seo Ji-hyang
- Choi Jae-joon (JJ)
- Oh In-hyung
- Ko Soo-hwan
- Shin Mi-jung

== Other media ==
=== Webcomic ===
- So I Married an Anti-fan (2011) (Wann)
- So I Married the Anti-fan (2018) (Jaerim)
