= Beijing Love Story =

Beijing Love Story may refer to:

- Beijing Love Story (TV series), a 2012 Chinese television series
- Beijing Love Story (film), a 2014 Chinese romance film
