= Takes a Real Man =

- Genre: Variety show
- Based on: Real Men (TV series) by MBC
- Country of origin: China
- Original language: Mandarin
- No. of seasons: 3
- No. of episodes: TBA

Production
- Production location: Mainland China
- Camera setup: Multicamera setup
- Running time: 90 minutes

Original release
- Network: HBS: Hunan Television
- Release: May 1, 2015

Related
- Real Men

Man (simplified Chinese: 真正男子汉; traditional Chinese: 真正男子漢; pinyin: Zhēnzhèng Nánzǐhàn) is a Chinese variety show that airs on Hunan Television. The show is based on the South Korean series Real Men by MBC. The show is a large national defence education special program in the People's Republic of China. Season 1 began airing on May 1, 2015, Friday nights at 10:00 PM with 12 episodes total. Season 2 began airing on October 21, 2016 on Friday nights with 14 episodes total. Season 3 will start filming on June 18, 2017.

== Cast ==
=== Season 1 ===
The first season would start by enlisting 6 males in the People's Liberation Army Ground Force.

- Wang Baoqiang (badly hurt in Episode 5, returned to the troop in Episode 7)
- Zhang Fengyi
- Yuan Hong
- Guo Xiaodong
- Du Haitao
- Liu Haoran
- Oho Ou (first appeared in Episode 6)

=== Season 2 ===
The second season differed from the first season by enlisting 4 females and 4 males in the People's Liberation Army Air Force.

- Yang Mi
- Jiang Jinfu
- Sun Yang (left the troop in connection with swimming at the 2016 Summer Olympics#Men's events in Episode 2, returned in Episode 5)
- Huang Zitao
- Tong Liya
- Shen Mengchen
- Zhang Lanxin
- Li Rui

=== Season 3 ===
- Liu Tao
- Jackson Yi
- Yang Zi
- Zhang Tianai
- Huang Xuan
- Zhu Yawen
- Wang Luodan
- Zhang Dada
