= 13th Huading Awards =

2014 entertainment awards

- Date: August 27, 2014

The 13th Huading Awards ceremony was held on August 27, 2014, in Beijing. The awards are a set of entertainment awards in China. Honorary Chairman Zhao Benshan and Jury Chairman Xi Meijuan. Stars Cai Shaofen, Chen Baoguo, Tong Liya, Jiang Yiyan, Hawick Lau, Zhang Kaili, Liu Tao, Xu Qing and others attended. After Chen Baoguo and Tong Liya won the best actor and best actress, Liu Jiang won the best director, and "Beat the Dog Stick" won the best drama series.

== Nominations and winners ==
Complete list of nominees and winners (denoted in bold)

Best Director	Best Screenwriter
**Liu Jiang** - **Let's Get Married**; Zheng Xiaolong - The New Story of Editorial Department; Kang Honglei - See Without Looking; Guan Hu - Fire Line, Three Brothers; Wen Zhang - Little Daddy	**Guo Jingyu, Dai Junqing, Xiao Shaoquan** - **Dog Stick**; Geling Yan - Mother Will Marry; Meng Yao - Let's Get Married; Wang Zhaozhuang - Search Path; Guo Baojing - The Mansion 1912
Best Actor	Best Actress
**Chen Baoguo** - **The Mansion 1912**; Francis Ng - Triumph in the Skies II; Huang Xiaoming - The Patriot Yue Fei; Huang Bo - Fire Line, Three Brothers; Wu Xiubo - Orphan of Zhao; Hu Jun - Old Days in Shanghai	**Tong Liya** - **Weaning**; Gao Yuanyuan - Let's Get Married; Sun Li - Hot Mom!; Jiang Wenli - Mother will Marry; Ruby Lin - The Patriot Yue Fei
Best Actor (Ancient Drama)	Best Actress (Ancient Drama)
**Hawick Lau** - **Painted Skin 2**; Feng Shaofeng - Prince of Lan Ling; Guo Jingfei - Longmen Express; Yan Yikuan - Heroes in Sui and Tang Dynasties; Wu Gang - Cha Song	**Ada Choi** - **Beauty at War**; Ruby Lin - The Patriot Yue Fei; Cherrie Ying - Orphan of Zhao; Yuan Shanshan - Swordsman; Ariel Lin - Prince of Lan Ling
Best Actor (Revolution-Era Drama)	Best Actress (Revolution-Era Drama)
**Cao Bingkun** - **Shen Tou**; Hu Jun - Old Days in Shanghai; Yu Xiaowei - Chuang Guan Dong: Prequel; Zhang Hanyu - Fire Line, Three Brothers; Yang Zhigang - Dog Stick	**Jiang Yiyan** - **Old Days in Shanghai**; Wang Likun - Miss Assassin; Zhang Xinyi - The Mansion 1912; Huang Xiaolei - Fire Line, Three Brothers; Tiffany Tang - Agent X
Best Actor (Contemporary Drama)	Best Actress (Contemporary Drama)
**Song Xiaobao** - **Cherry Red**; Chen Sicheng - The Sweet Burden; Lei Jiayin - Weaning; Lu Yi - If Life Cheats You; Francis Ng - Triumph in the Skies II	**Liu Tao** - **To Elderly with Love**; Li Xiaoran - Angel is Coming; Kate Tsui - Sniper Standoff; Tong Liya - Weaning; Sun Li - Hot Mom!
Best Supporting Actor	Best Supporting Actress
**Gallen Lo** - **The Patriot Yue Fei**; Morni Chang - Hot Mom!; Yu Yi - Dog Stick; Sun Chun - Orphan of Zhao; Kenneth Tsang - The War of Beauties	**Zhang Kaili** - **Let's Get Married**; Kara Hui - Women of the Tang Dynasty; Sun Ning - Fire Line, Three Brothers; Vivian Wu - Hot Mom!; Lü Liping - The New Story of Editorial Department
Best New Actor	Best New Actress
**Liu Huan** - **Little Daddy**; Chen Xiao - Legend of Lu Zhen; Jing Boran - The New Story of Editorial Department; Chen Xiang - Runaway Sweetheart; Yuan Hong - True Love Brings Trouble	**Wang Like** - **Cha Song**; Xu Fanxi - Little Daddy; Sun Xiaoxiao - True Love Brings Trouble; Li Meng - Fire Line, Three Brothers; Zanilia Zhao - Legend of Lu Zhen
Best Producer
**Liu Hui** - **Countryside Love**; **Liu Xiaona** - **Chen Yun**; Yu Zheng - Legend of Lu Zhen; Liu Bin - When Youth Meets Puberty; Triumph in the Skies II
Top 10 Dramas	Audience's Favorite Stars
**Dog Stick**; Let's Get Married; Triumph in the Skies II; Long Men Express; Little Daddy; Hot Mom!; Orphan of Zhao; Countryside Love; Xi Zhongxun; The Patriot Yue Fei	~~Zheng Shuang~~; Kenneth Tsang; Fan Ming; Yue Lina; Chen Chao-jung (Aaron Chen); Tong Liya; Chen Baoguo; Wang Zhifei; Lee Li-chun; Heidi Wong
Best OST	Best Production Company
**See (看見)** (**See Without Looking** **OST**) - **Tan Jing**; Finally Waited For You (終於等到你) (Lets Get Married OST) - Jane Zhang; Meeting is better than Missing (相見不如懷念) (Little Daddy OST) - Fan Fan; Treasure (珍惜) (Legend of Lu Zhen OST) - Li Yuchun; Live For Your Dreams (為夢而活) (Mother Will Marry OST) - Mao Amin	**Perfect World**; Benmountain Media Group; TVB; Beijing Galloping Horse Film & TV Production; Huayi Brothers
Outstanding Achievement Award	Media Popularity Award
**Wei Zi**	**Siqin Gaowa**
