= 38th Golden Rooster Awards =

2025 Chinese film awards ceremony

- Official poster
- Awarded for: Excellence in cinematic achievements
- Announced on: Nominations: September 26, 2025
- Presented on: November 15, 2025
- Site: Xiamen International Conference & Exhibition Center; Xiamen, Fujian, China

Highlights
- Best Feature Film: Her Story
- Best Direction: Chen Sicheng, Dai Mo; Detective Chinatown 1900
- Best Actor: Jackson Yee; Big World
- Best Actress: Song Jia; Her Story
- Lifetime achievement: Qiao Zhen; Xiao Guiyun

Television coverage
- Channel: CCTV

38th Golden Rooster Awards
- Simplified Chinese: 第38届中国电影金鸡奖
- Traditional Chinese: 第38屆中國電影金雞獎
Transcriptions
Standard Mandarin
- Hanyu Pinyin: Dì Sānshībā Jiè Zhōngguó Diànyǐng Jīnjījiǎng

The 38th Golden Rooster Awards ceremony was held in Xiamen, Fujian, China, from November 11 to November 15, 2025. It coincides with the 120th anniversary of Chinese cinema, featuring special forums, retrospectives, and cultural activities.

The 38th Golden Rooster Awards include 20 categories, covering Best Feature Film, Best Director, Best Actor/ Actress, and technical achievements. A total of 212 eligible films were evaluated, with nominations based on works released between 1 July 2024, and 30 June 2025. The Volunteers: The Battle of Life and Death and Her Story received the most nominations, with a total of seven.

== Awards ==
=== Feature awards ===
Nominees and winners (winners denoted in bold)

Best Picture	Best Low-budget Feature
**Her Story**; Big World; The Lychee Road; The Volunteers: The Battle of Life and Death; Detective Chinatown 1900; The Last Dance	**Fate of the Moonlight**; A Song Sung Blue; The Town of Wulong; Dreaming of Mother and Home; A River Without Tears
Best Children Film	Best Drama Film
**Shining Youth: Air Relay**; No Shame; The Boy in the Moonlight; Goodbye, Firefly; Bronze Sunflower	**Double Butterfly Fan (Min Opera)**; Song of the Great Wind (Xi Opera); Yu Chenglong in Civilian Clothes (Jin Opera); Chongdu Ditch (Yu Opera); The Lucky Pearl Purse (Peking Opera); The River All Red (Peking Opera)
Best Documentary/Educational Film	Best Art/Animation Film
**Your Voice**; On the Way to School; Hometown Return; She Is Hung Sin-nui; Panda Adventure	**Ne Zha 2**; Endless Journey of Love; Strange Tales of Liaozhai: Temple of Lanruo; I Am What I Am 2; Boonie Bears: Future Reborn; A Story About Fire; The Reunion Journey
Best Foreign Language Film	Special Jury Prize
**There's Still Tomorrow (Italy)**; F1 (United States); Here (United States); I'm Still Here (Brazil, France); How to Make Millions Before Grandma Dies (Thailand)	**The Volunteers: The Battle of Life and Death**

=== Individual awards ===
Best Director	Best Directorial Debut
**Chen Sicheng, Dai Mo – Detective Chinatown 1900**; Da Peng – The Lychee Road; Anselm Chan – The Last Dance; Shao Yihui – Her Story; Gu Changwei – The Hedgehog	**Gao Peng – A Long Shot**; Dajie Dingzeng – The Boy in the Moonlight; Li Ji – Big Scene; Qin Tian – Fate of the Moonlight; Huang Tingting – Lucky Pavilion
Best Writing	Best Editing
**Anselm Chan, Cheng Wai-kei – The Last Dance**; Chen Kaige, Zhang Ke – The Volunteers: The Battle of Life and Death; Shao Yihui – Her Story; You Xiaoying – Big World	**Zhou Xinxia – Dreaming of Mother and Home**; Tang Hongjia – Detective Chinatown 1900; Li Dianshi – The Volunteers: The Battle of Life and Death; William Chang, Curran Pang – The Last Dance; Liao Ching-sung – Bronze Sunflower
Best Actor	Best Actress
**Jackson Yee – Big World as Liu Chunhe**; Da Peng – The Lychee Road as Li Shande; Zhu Yilong – The Volunteers: The Battle of Life and Death as Li Xiang; Liu Haoran – Decoded as Rong Jinzhen; Huang Xiaoming – Mostly Sunny as Wu You	**Song Jia – Her Story as Wang Tiemei**; Michelle Wai – The Last Dance as Guo Wenyue; Yong Mei – Like A Rolling Stone as Li Hong; Duan Aojuan – The Lost Daughter as Liu Suisui; Xu Haipeng – Fate of the Moonlight as Xia Chan
Best Supporting Actor	Best Supporting Actress
**Ben Yuen – The Dumpling Queen as Uncle Sweet Soup**; Zhou Zhengjie – A Long Shot as Geng Xiaojun; Mark Chao – Her Story as Ex-husband; Geng Le – The Hedgehog as Zhou Zheng's Father	**Zhong Chuxi – Her Story as Xiao Ye**; Song Xiaoying – Dreaming of Mother and Home as Zheng Danzhu; Huang Ziqi – A Song Sung Blue as Jin Mingmei; Jiang Qinqin – Big World as Chen Lu; Kara Wai – The Dumpling Queen as Sister Hong
Best Cinematography	Best Sound Recording
**Zhao Fei – The Volunteers: The Battle of Life and Death**; Wang Boxue – The Lychee Road; Zhang Xing – Tide; Cao Yu – Decoded; Bao Dexi, Cai Wenlong, Zhou Zhihui, Ye Zhen – Operation Hadal	**Wang Danrong – The Volunteers: The Battle of Life and Death**; Li Danfeng, Si Zhonglin – Big World; Zhang Jinyan, Long Xiaozhu – Her Story; Hao Gang – The Hedgehog; Fu Kang – A Long Shot
Best Art Direction	Best Music
**Han Zhong, Ma Xiaofei – Decoded**; Wang Jing – The Lychee Road; Liu Shan – The Panorama of Rivers and Mountains; Lu Wei – The Volunteers: The Battle of Life and Death; Zhuo Wenyao, Zhou Defu – Operation Hadal	**Zhai Jinyan – The Lychee Road**; Lv Liang – The Panorama of Rivers and Mountains; Li He – The Silent Love; Chen Guangrong, Li Minglang – Dumpling Queen; Gao Xiaoyang – A Long Shot
Lifetime Achievement
**Qiao Zhen**; **Xiao Guiyun**
