= How Long Will I Love U =

- Official poster
- Traditional Chinese: 超時空同居
- Simplified Chinese: 超时空同居
- Literal meaning: Extra-Spacetime Cohabitation
- Hanyu Pinyin: Chāo Shíkōng Tóngjū
- Directed by: Su Lun
- Screenplay by: Su Lun
- Story by: Xu Zheng
- Produced by: Xu Zheng
- Starring: Lei Jiayin; Tong Liya
- Cinematography: Wang Junming
- Edited by: Chen Zhongming
- Music by: Peng Fei; Zhao Zhao
- Production companies: Beijing Joy Leader Culture Communication; Beijing Jingwumen Cultural Development; Beijing Enlight Pictures
- Release date: 18 May 2018
- Running time: 101 minutes
- Country: China
- Language: Mandarin
- Budget: $6 million
- Box office: $136.7 million

How Long Will I Love U (Chinese: 超时空同居) is a 2018 Chinese fantasy romantic comedy film written and directed by Su Lun, based on an idea by Xu Zheng who also produced the film. The film stars Tong Liya and Lei Jiayin, and tells a story about a young woman from 2018 and a young man from 1999 who become roommates after a spacetime merge inside their apartment.

Reportedly filmed on a ¥40 million budget, How Long Will I Love U grossed ¥900 million ($130 million) in China where it premiered on 18 May 2018. Foreign critics generally note the fine on-screen chemistry between Lei and Tong, who previously co-starred in the 2013 TV series Weaning.

== Cast ==
- Lei Jiayin as Lu Ming, a down-on-his-luck property designer in 1999
  - Lei Jiayin as Lu Shiyi, a billionaire, whom Lu Ming originally became in 2018
- Tong Liya as Gu Xiaojiao, a frustrated young woman in 2018
  - Han Jiaying as Young Gu Xiaojiao in 1999
- Zhang Yi as Zhao Junyi, Lu Ming's supervisor (in 1999)
- Wang Zhengjia as Gu Qixiang, Gu Xiaojiao's father and Zhao Junyi's boss, originally died in 1999
- Yang Le as Xiaoma, real estate agent (in 2018)
- Fan Ming as Potato wholesaler (in 2018)
- Xu Zheng as Lamian chef offering online delivery (in 2018)
- Tao Hong as Gu Xiaojiao's supervisor (in 2018)
- Li Nian as Xiaoya, Gu Xiaojiao's former classmate (in 2018)
- Li Guangjie as Sicheng, Xiaoya's husband (in 2018)
- Yang Di as Waiter (in 2018)
- Yu Hewei as Scientist (in 2018)

== Soundtrack ==
No.	Title	Lyrics	Music	Singer(s)	Length
1.	"Don't Forget Me (不要忘了我)" (Theme)	Chen Xi	Dong Dongdong	Lei Jiayin/ Tong Liya	04:38
2.	"The First Love Place (初恋的地方)" (Theme)	Sun Yi	Liu Chia-chang	Jeff Chang	03:43
3.	"Fangjian ("房间", "Room")"	Liu Ruiqi	Liu Ruiqi	Liu Ruiqi	02:36

== Production ==
Su Lun was hired as director and screenwriter, Xu Zheng read her drafts and gave notes for improvement.

The film pays homage to Alejandro Agresti's The Lake House and Robert Schwentke's The Time Traveler's Wife.

Lei Jiayin said that Liu Haoran was considered for the role of young Lu Ming, but because of funding problems, he had to play the role's youth and adulthood.

Production started on September 8, 2017 in Shanghai and ended on November 14 of that same year.

== Release ==
How Long Will I Love U gross revenue breakdown
Territory	Gross Revenue ($)
China	$135,346,907
United States	$746,933
Australia	$547,919
New Zealand	$105,309
Total:	$136,747,068

On April 4, 2018, the crew announced that the film was scheduled for release on May 18, 2018. On April 15, the cast and crew attended the Press Conference in Beijing. On April 26, the first official trailer for the film was released along with a teaser poster.

How Long Will I Love U's opening day gross was 52.5 million yuan, by the weekend, the film's accumulated grossed reached 236 million yuan.

According to Box Office Mojo, the film grossed $136.7 million in 4 international markets.

== Awards ==
- 2018 China Movie Channel Media Awards
  - Won—Best New Director, Su Lun
  - Won—Best Actress, Tong Liya
  - Nominated—Best Actor, Lei Jiayin

== See also ==
- Meet Me @ 1006, a 2018 Taiwanese TV series with a similar premise
