= Liu Haoran =

Chinese actor (born 1997)

- 刘昊然
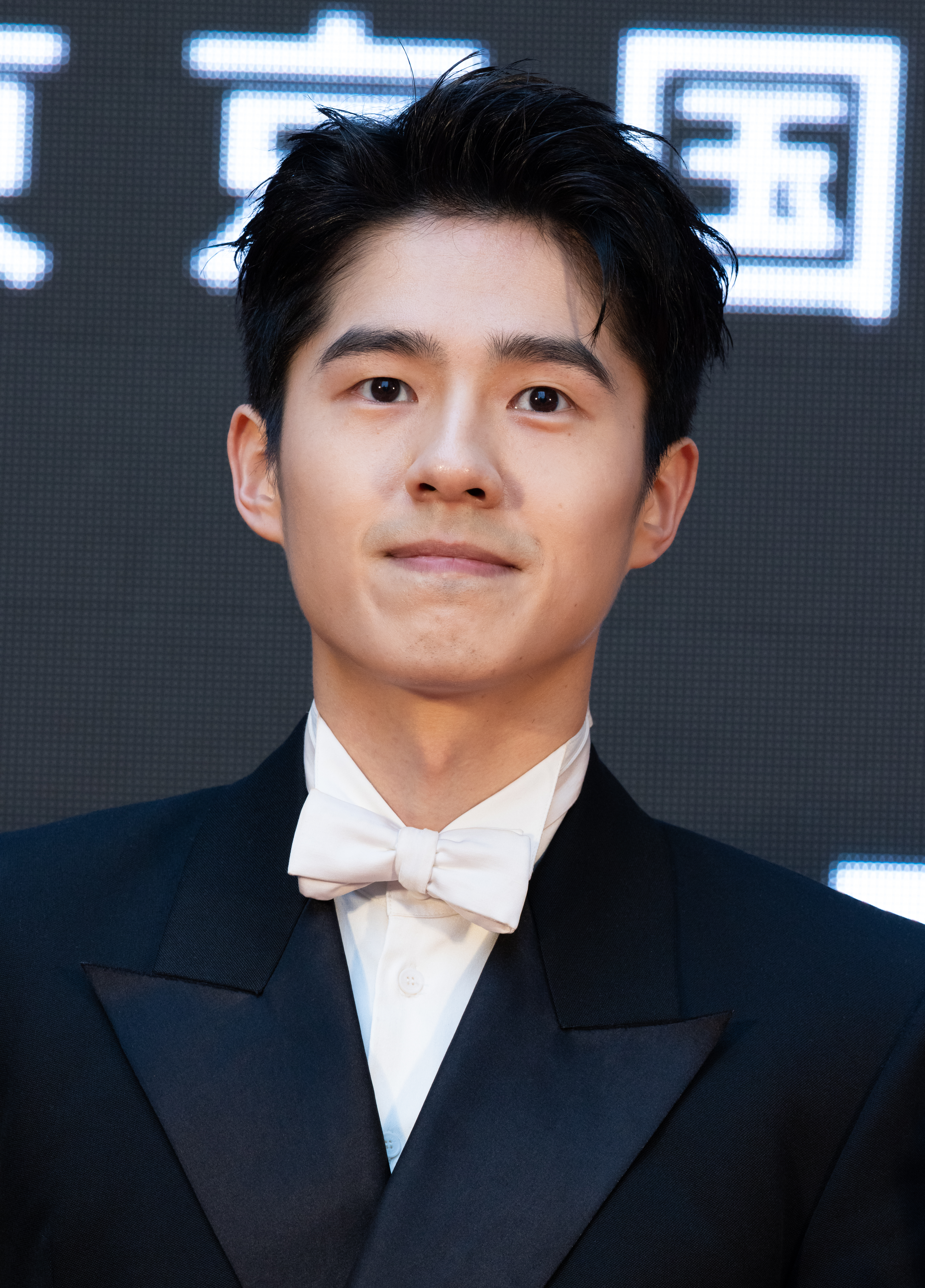
- Liu at the 37th Tokyo International Film Festival in 2024
- Born: Liu Yuan; 10 October 1997 (age 29); Pingdingshan, Henan, China
- Other name: Turbo Liu
- Education: Central Academy of Drama
- Occupation: Actor
- Years active: 2014–present
- Agent: As One Production

Chinese name
- Simplified Chinese: 刘昊然
- Traditional Chinese: 劉昊然
Transcriptions
Standard Mandarin
- Hanyu Pinyin: Liú Hàorán

Liu Yuan
- Simplified Chinese: 刘源
- Traditional Chinese: 劉源
Transcriptions
Standard Mandarin
- Hanyu Pinyin: Liú Rán

Liu Yuan (born 10 October 1997), known professionally as Liu Haoran, also known as Turbo Liu, is a Chinese actor. He is best known for his roles in the Detective Chinatown film series and Dead to Rights (2025), as well as the television series With You (2016) and Nirvana in Fire 2 (2017).

In 2025, Liu became the youngest actor to gross over ¥25 billion (~US$3.51 billion) at the Chinese box office.

== Early life ==
Liu was born in 1997 in Pingdingshan, Henan, and moved to Beijing at the age of 12 to attend the Affiliated Secondary School of Beijing Dance Academy. His father is a senior executive in a company, and his mother is a Peking opera performer. In 2013 when he was still a student, Liu was hand-picked by Chinese actor/director Chen Sicheng to star in Chen's directorial film debut, Beijing Love Story. In 2015, Liu enrolled in the Central Academy of Drama after receiving the highest yikao score in the university's acting department.

== Career ==
Liu made his acting debut in the 2014 romance film Beijing Love Story, and was nominated for Best New Actor at the 2015 Beijing College Student Film Festival.

In 2015, Liu starred in the comedy mystery film, Detective Chinatown, directed by Chen Sicheng, and won a Best New Actor Award at the Huading Awards for his performance. That same year, Liu starred in his first small-screen project, campus drama With You, which was adapted from the youth novel under the same title. The drama series earned positive reviews, and Liu won Most Popular New Actor at the 2016 iQiyi All-Star Carnival.

In 2017, Liu played Su Yu in the patriotic film, The Founding of an Army. He also featured in the historical mystery film Legend of the Demon Cat, which was directed by acclaimed director Chen Kaige. That same year, he starred in the historical drama, Nirvana in Fire 2, which was a Daylight Entertainment production directed by the famed director Kong Sheng and the sequel to Nirvana in Fire by written by Hai Yan. The series was critically acclaimed, and Liu received recognition for his acting.

In 2018, Liu reprised his role in the film Detective Chinatown 2, which premiered on Chinese New Year. The movie was a box office hit and grossed 3.4 billion RMB and is one of the top 10 highest-grossing film of all time in China (as of September 2022). Liu was nominated for Best Actor at the Hundred Flowers Awards for his role and became the youngest actor to be nominated in the lead actor category for this award. For Liu's accomplishments, Forbes China honored him as one of their 30 Under 30 Asia 2018 list, which consisted of 30 influential people under 30 years old who have had a substantial effect in their fields.

In 2019, Liu filmed two movies with Chen Kaige, Flowers Bloom in the Ashes and My People My Country. His xuanhuan epic drama Novoland: Eagle Flag, adapted from novels by the same name written by Jiang Nan, aired on Zhejiang TV, becoming the channel's highest rated drama in the 10pm time slot.

In 2020, Liu graduated from the Central Academy of Drama and successfully auditioned into the China Coal Mine Art Troupe where he also received bianzhe (编制). He performed Xue Wo Zhong Hua with the Art Troupe at China's National Center for the Performing Arts. That same year, he also starred in the films My People My Homeland and Coffee or Tea.

In 2021, Liu's film Detective Chinatown 3 premiered during Chinese New Year and immediately grossed 1.01 billion RMB, 818 million RMB, and 749 million RMB for the first three days, respectively, and continues to hold the record for the top 3 single-day box office revenue in China's box office history. The box office success of Detective Chinatown 3 (totaling in excess of 4.5 billion RMB) catapulted Liu to become the youngest actor to gross over 15 billion RMB (approx. US$2.32 billion) at the Chinese box office for leading roles. He also starred as Liu Renjing in the film 1921, directed by famed director Huang Jianxin (making it their fourth collaboration). Also in 2021, Liu's film Fire on the Plain, produced by Diao Yinan, was invited to the main competition at the San Sebastián International Film Festival. That same year, Liu was invited as a representative to attend The 11th Congress of the China Federation of Literary and Art Circles, which occurs once every five years. At 24 years old, he was one of the youngest representatives out of over 2000 attendees.

In 2022, Liu's film Only Fools Rush In, directed by Han Han, premiered during Chinese New Year, making it his third Chinese New Year film. Liu earned a Best Supporting Actor nomination at the 36th Hundred Flower Awards for his portrayal of Liu Renjing in the film 1921.

In 2023, The Breaking Ice, directed by Anthony Chen and starring Liu, premiered in the Un Certain Regard section of the 2023 Cannes Film Festival. The Breaking Ice was also selected by the Singapore Film Commission as Singapore's submission to the best international feature category of the 2024 Oscars (96th Academy Awards).

In 2024, My Friend An Delie, the directorial debut of actor Dong Zijian and starring Liu and Dong, was selected to compete at the 37th Tokyo International Film Festival. In the same year, Liu won the Golden Crane Award for best actor at the 37th Tokyo International Film Festival China Film Week for his leading role as Rong Jinzhen in Decoded. Liu also served as a jury member for the Project Investment Competition at the 14th Beijing International Film Festival.

== Filmography ==
=== Film ===
Year	English title	Chinese title	Role	Notes	Ref.
2014	Beijing Love Story	北京爱情故事	Song Ge		
2015	Forever Young	栀子花开	Host	Cameo	
2015	Detective Chinatown	唐人街探案	Qin Feng		
2017	Buddies in India	大闹天竺	Erlang Shen	Cameo	
2017	The Founding of an Army	建军大业	Su Yu		
2017	Legend of the Demon Cat	妖猫传	Bai Long		
2018	Detective Chinatown 2	唐人街探案2	Qin Feng		
2018	Happiness Is Coming	幸福马上来	Ma Xiao	Cameo	
2019	How to Train Your Dragon: The Hidden World	驯龙高手3	Hiccup	Voice; Chinese dub	
2019	The Twins	双生	Li Ping		
2019	My People, My Country	我和我的祖国	Wo Dele	Segment: "The Guiding Star"	
2020	My People, My Homeland	我和我的家乡	Xiao Qin	Segment: "A Mystery of UFO"	
2020	Coffee or Tea?	一点就到家	Wei Jinbei		
2021	Detective Chinatown 3	唐人街探案3	Qin Feng		
2021	1921	1921	Liu Renjing		
2021	Embrace Again	穿过寒冬拥抱你	Zhang Zhe	Cameo	
2022	Only Fools Rush In	四海	Wu Renyao		
2023	The Breaking Ice	燃冬	Hao Feng		
2024	The Boy and the Heron	你想活出怎样的人生	Mahito Maki	Voice; Chinese dub	
2024	Decoded	解密	Rong Jinzhen		
2025	Detective Chinatown 1900	唐探 1900	Qin Fu		
2025	Fire on the Plain	平原上的火焰	Zhuang Shu		
2025	Dead to Rights	南京照相馆	Su Liuchang		
2026	My Friend An Delie	我的朋友安德烈	Li Mo		
2026	It's My Time	魔方小姐	Wu Youwei		
TBA	Flowers From the Ashes	少年时代			

=== Television series ===
Year	English title	Chinese title	Role	Notes	Ref.
2016	With You	最好的我们	Yu Huai		
2017	Midnight Diner	深夜食堂	Music producer	Cameo	
2017	Nirvana in Fire 2	琅琊榜之风起长林	Xiao Pingjing		
2018	Great Expectations: Meeting of the Two Dragons	远大前程·双龙会	Huo Zhenxiao		
2019	Novoland: Eagle Flag	九州缥缈录	Lǚ Guichen		
2022	Bright Future	zh:县委大院	Mei Xiaoge (young)	Cameo	
TBD	Take A Nap	海岛舒服日志	Xie Yuyang		

=== Variety shows ===
Year	English title	Chinese title	Role	Ref.
2015	Takes a Real Man (Season 1)	真正男子汉	Cast member	
2017	Give Me Five (Season 1)	高能少年团	Cast member	
2021	Oh Youth!	恰好是少年	Cast member	
2024	Game of Cubes: The New Utopia	魔方新世界	Cast member	

== Theater ==
Year	English title	Chinese title	Role	Ref.
2021	Xue Wo Zhong Hua	血沃中华	Dong Cunrui	
2025	The Smell of Warmth	温暖的味道	Sun Guangming	

== Discography ==
=== Singles ===
Year	English Title	Chinese Title	Album	Notes	Ref.
2015	"Yearning for Glory"	渴望光荣	Takes a Real Man OST		
2016	"Holy High"	猴厉嗨	—N/a	Promotional song for Suning with Wu Mochou & Huang Cancan	
2017	"Proud Youths"	骄傲的少年	Give Me Five OST	with Zhang Yishan, Wang Junkai, Dong Zijian & Darren Wang	
2018	"Pink Memories"	粉紅色的回憶	Detective Chinatown 2 OST	with Wang Baoqiang, Zhang Zifeng, Xiaoshenyang & Xiao Yang	
2019	"My Motherland and I"	我和我的祖国	My People My Country OST	with Chen Feiyu, Zhou Dongyu, Ou Hao & Zhu Yilong	
2019	"Starry Sea"	星辰大海		For China Movie Channel Young Actors Project	
2019	"Dream"	梦想		Theme song for China Student Television Festival	
2019	"Cool Doll"	酷你吉娃	Detective Chinatown 3 OST		

== Accolades ==
=== Awards and nominations ===
Year	Awards	Category	Nominated work	Result	Ref.
2014	21st Beijing College Student Film Festival	Best New Actor	Beijing Love Story	Nominated	
2016	24th Shanghai Film Critics Awards	Best New Actor	Detective Chinatown	Nominated	
2016	19th Shanghai International Film Festival (Asian New Talent Award)	Best New Actor	Detective Chinatown	Nominated	
2016	20th Huading Awards	Best New Actor	Detective Chinatown	Won	
2016	16th Chinese Film Media Awards	Most Anticipated Actor	Detective Chinatown	Nominated	
2016	16th Chinese Film Media Awards	Most Anticipated Performance	Detective Chinatown	Nominated	
2018	34th Hundred Flowers Awards	Best Actor	Detective Chinatown 2	Nominated	
2022	36th Hundred Flowers Awards	Best Supporting Actor	1921	Nominated	
2024	2024 Tokyo International Film Festival Chinese Film Week Golden Crane Awards	Best Actor	Decoded	Won	
2025	20th Changchun Film Festival - Golden Deer Awards	Best Actor	Decoded	Won	
2025	38th Golden Rooster Awards	Best Actor	Decoded	Nominated	
2026	19th Asian Film Awards	Next Generation Awards	—N/a	Won	
2026	1st CMG Film Awards	Best Actor	Dead to Rights	Won	
2026	38th Hundred Flowers Awards	Best Actor	Dead to Rights	Nominated	

=== Forbes China Celebrity 100 ===
Year	Rank	Ref.
2017	89th	
2019	19th	
2020	18th	
