= Detective Chinatown 1900 =

- Theatrical release poster
- Chinese: 唐探1900
- Hanyu Pinyin: Tángtàn 1900
- Directed by: Chen Sicheng; Dai Mo
- Written by: Chen Sicheng
- Produced by: Chen Sicheng
- Starring: Wang Baoqiang; Liu Haoran; Chow Yun-fat; Bai Ke; Zhang Xincheng; Yue Yunpeng; John Cusack
- Cinematography: Du Jie
- Edited by: Tang Jongjia
- Music by: Nathan Wang
- Production companies: Wanda Film; Beijing Yitong Legend Film Culture Co., Ltd.; China Film Co., Ltd.
- Distributed by: Wanda Pictures
- Release date: January 29, 2025
- Running time: 135 minutes
- Country: China
- Languages: Mandarin; English
- Box office: $455 million

Detective Chinatown 1900 (Chinese: 唐探1900) is a 2025 Chinese comedy mystery buddy film directed by Chen Sicheng and Dai Mo, starring Wang Baoqiang, Liu Haoran, with a special appearance by Chow Yun-fat. It is the fourth installment in the Detective Chinatown franchise. It is not narratively connected to the previous installments in the franchise. Wang Baoqiang and Liu Haoran, the leads in the previous films, returned but play different characters. The film, which is set in San Francisco in 1900, follows the story of Qin Fu and Ah Gui's investigation into the murder of a white woman in Chinatown. Principal photography began in July 2024 at Laoling Film Studio and ended in October of the same year. The film premiered on 29 January 2025 during the Spring Festival. The musical score for the film was composed by Nathan Wang.

== Plot ==
In 1900, Alice Grant, daughter of a U.S. Congressman, is found murdered and disembowelled in San Francisco's Chinatown alongside an elderly Native American chief Six Hands. The prime suspect is Bai Zhenbang, son of Bai Xuanling – leader of Chinatown's Hip Sing Tong. Exploiting the incident to advance his mayoral candidacy, Dr Grant seeks to strengthen the Chinese exclusion bill and shut down the Chinatown. To clear his son's name, Bai Xuanling enlists Qin Fu, a young detective trained by Sherlock Holmes. Qin has also come to assist Manchu official Fei Yanggu, who is dispatched by Empress Dowager Cixi to capture the revolutionaries Sun Wen and Zheng Shiliang. Initially wary of Bai's henchmen, Qin tries to escape and encounters Ah Gui, Six Hands' Chinese adoptive son, and agrees to help him track down the murderer.

Back at Hip Sing Tong, Bai receives Fei. Zheng appears, but when Fei tries to arrest him, Bai offers Zheng protection. When Qin and Gui questions Bai Zhenbang, Zheng admits he and Bai have stolen firearms from an Irish gang to prepare for Sun Wen's revolution. Qin and Fu's subsequent investigations reveal Alice was killed elsewhere and moved to the crime scene, and that Six Hands was likely murdered for witnessing the crime. They also determine that the killer was an expert with a knife and discover wood shavings in Alice's head and hair. After Grant refuses to cooperate, they instead break into the Grant household, where Qin discovers scratches on the banister.

The next day, Bai and Zheng disappear, and Qin and Gui track them to a performance by Chinese magician Jin Lingfu at the Chinese Theater. After a confrontation with Fei, Qin and Gui escape with the fugitives. Bai admits his secret relationship with Alice, whom he met in London, and reveals their plan to flee San Francisco. He adds that only Alice's maid, Amanda, knew of their relationship. Meanwhile, Fei allies with the Irish gang.

Lin Yue'e, a traditional Chinese medicine practitioner, is found murdered, and Amanda disappears. While Lin was similarly disembowelled, Qin and Gui conclude another suspect was involved. When Qin and Gui assist Bai and Zheng in loading the guns on Jin's ship, Zheng and them are captured by Fei and the Irish. They are soon rescued by Gui's Native American tribe, and in the resulting confrontation, most of the Irish gang and Fei are killed. Amanda's body is later discovered at Bai's silk factory. A suspect tries to flee the scene, but is shot by Grant and falls into a cold pool. Bai Zhenbang's body surfaces, and the case is officially closed, fuelling anti-Chinese sentiments.

Bai Xuanling attends a municipal hearing on the proposed appropriation of Chinese-owned property in Chinatown. At the same time, Qin, Gui and Zheng present their findings at the police news conference, revealing that Bai Zhenbang's body had been concealed in the pool and surfaced only when the true culprit, Thomas Lawrence – an accomplice of Grant – attempted to flee. They further disclose that Alice was pregnant and she intended to tell Bai before their planned departure. However, during an argument with her father the night before, she fatally fell from an upper landing. Qin accuses Grant of exploiting the Jack the Ripper legend to conceal Alice's pregnancy and advance his mayoral campaign. Grant admits to shooting Bai after confronting him about Alice's death but maintains that her death was accidental. He also confesses that Lawrence killed Lin and Amanda for knowing the truth before he shoots himself in front of a stunned audience.

Qin, Gui and Zheng join Bai's defence, highlighting Chinese contributions to the transcontinental railroad. Bai also reveals he once worked with Gui's biological father on the project. However, Bai's assets are still confiscated for his involvement in gang activities. Disillusioned by rising anti-Chinese sentiment, Qin tears up his residence card after the hearing. In the aftermath, Weyman, Bai's close friend, admits to orchestrating the events to eliminate Grant as a political rival. He was present when Alice died and instructs police officer Lance to deliver key evidence to Qin and Gui. Weyman wants Bai's factory land for its oil. As Bai leaves San Francisco, he urges Qin to stay, and Qin and Gui establish themselves as the Detective Chinatown duo.

== Cast ==
- Wang Baoqiang as Ah Gui, a Chinese immigrant who was raised in a Native American tribe following his parents' death in a mining accident. At the end of the show, he was given the surname Tang.
- Liu Haoran as Qin Fu, a traditional Chinese medicine physician.
- Chow Yun-fat as Bai Xuanling
- Bai Ke as Zheng Shiliang
- Zhang Xincheng as Bai Zhenbang
- Yue Yunpeng as Fei Yanggu
- Yin Zheng as Feng Ma
- John Cusack as Grant
- Li Xuejian as Chan
- AJ Donnelly as Thomas Lawrence
- Vanda Margraf as Princess Da

== Reception ==
Phil Hoad of The Guardian gave Detective Chinatown 1900 3 out of 5 stars, describing it as "tightly paced and snappily directed", with a charming cultural message and effective humor that adequately explores anti-Chinese xenophobia without excessive patriotism, though he believes it ultimately undermines its themes with an "oddly pointed" political coda at the end. Wen Yen of Guangming Daily praised the film for "skillfully blending realism and romanticism", delivering a compelling narrative rooted in historical truths that resonate with the collective aspirations of the Chinese, while innovatively incorporating traditional elements to create a unique cultural dialogue on justice and identity.

James Marsh of Deadline Hollywood found the film to be visually opulent yet "sometimes preachy", tackling themes of racism and immigration while delivering engaging performances, particularly from Chow Yun-fat, but it ultimately falls short of its potential due to a predictable plot and a lackluster villain. Alan Ng of Film Threat gave the film 5 out of 10 and considered it to be ambitious but ultimately disappointing, as it struggles to balance its slapstick comedy with an "over-bloated cast and subplots", leaving little room for the promised buddy-cop dynamic, despite some impressive production design and gruesome humor.

== Accolades ==
| Year | Award | Category | Recipient(s) | Result | Ref. |
|---|---|---|---|---|---|
| 2025 | 38th Golden Rooster Awards | Best Picture | Detective Chinatown 1900 | Nominated | |
| 2025 | 38th Golden Rooster Awards | Best Director | Chen Sicheng and Dai Mo | Won | |
| 2025 | 38th Golden Rooster Awards | Best Editing | Tang Hongjia | Nominated | |
