= Detective Chinatown 3 =

2021 film by Chen Sicheng

- Theatrical release poster with original release date
- Chinese: 唐人街探案 3
- Hanyu Pinyin: Tángrénjiē Tàn Àn 3
- Directed by: Chen Sicheng
- Written by: Chen Sicheng; Wusi Liu; Nomy Xu; Yining Yan; Chun Zhang; Lian Zhou
- Produced by: Sun Tao; Xu Jianhai
- Starring: Wang Baoqiang; Liu Haoran
- Cinematography: Jie Du
- Edited by: Hongjia Tang
- Music by: Xiao'ou Hu; Nathan Wang
- Production companies: Wanda Pictures; Beijing Yitong Legend Films; China Film Co., Ltd.; Warner Bros. Pictures (United States only)
- Distributed by: Wanda Pictures; Warner Bros. Pictures (United States only)
- Release date: 12 February 2021 (China)
- Running time: 136 minutes
- Country: China
- Languages: Mandarin; Japanese; English
- Budget: $117 million
- Box office: $686.3 million

Detective Chinatown 3 (Chinese: 唐人街探案 3) is a 2021 Chinese comedy mystery buddy film directed and written by Chen Sicheng, starring Wang Baoqiang and Liu Haoran. It is a sequel to Detective Chinatown 2 (2018) and is the third installment in the Detective Chinatown series. It was released on 12 February 2021.

The film set several box office records, including the biggest opening weekend ever in a single territory, and grossed over US$686 million, becoming the sixth-highest-grossing film of 2021 and the sixth-highest-grossing non-English film of all time.

It was followed by a fourth film, Detective Chinatown 1900 (2025), which again starred Wang and Liu, though as new characters with different backstories.

== Plot ==
After the events in Bangkok and New York, Tang Ren and Qin Feng are invited to Tokyo to investigate another crime that has occurred there by Noda Hiroshi regarding a murder of a Southeast Asian gang boss, Su Chaiwat, leading to a battle between the strongest detectives in Asia.

Tang and Qin on plane eating junk food and Tang needs to use the bathroom. Once the plane landed and after being picked up by Noda, the trio witnessed total anarchy across the city due to the case. However, as they were leaving, they were stalked by Thailand's newest great detective, Jack Jaa who has been steadily climbing the Crimaster app into the top ten rankings and working on the Southeast Asian gang's side to figure out how their boss died. After a lengthy chase, Noda bought time for Tang and Qin by leaping off the bus they were in and pounced on Jack.

Qin and Tang then headed to the bathhouse that was frequented by the accused of the case and the leader of the Yakuza group, Masaru Watanabe. Masaru then told Tang and Qin that prior to the murder, both his organization and the Southeast Asians were locked in a bitter rivalry for the development project in New Chinatown but they were in their final legs of negotiations to cease the war and to cede the projects to either side with the negotiations being held in a building on top of a lake with only one entrance. Masaru then stated that when both parties were in the process of negotiating, both leaders were offered tea but after taking a sip of it, both sides felt groggy and he suddenly blacked out after it and when he had awoken from the noise of his men, he had noticed that Chaiwat had been stabbed and was in a pool of his own blood before being carried out by his men.

With Noda rejoining both Qin and Tang, the trio visited the building on the lake and after a short re-enactment, they noticed that the scene was cleaned of any evidence completely but still found a bronze vase that had marks on it and deduced that the vase was used as a weapon at one point and that Masaru was lying about blacking out. Just then, Chaiwit's secretary, Anna Kobayashi led a group of monks to the building to pray. With a short interview, she told the trio that she was the first to barge into the building after hearing the chaos from outside followed by men from both sides and had attempted to bring Chaiwit to the hospital before having Chaiwit die in her arms on route to the hospital whilst saying it was Masaru that had stabbed him. She also revealed that prior to both leaders being alone in the room, Masaru had tried to poach Kobayashi to his side and even tried to sexually assault her. Just as Tang was showing the vase as an evidence, Jack, who has disguised as a monk in the group that Kobayashi had brought with her, appeared and snatched the vase off Tang's hand but right after, the Japanese police led by senior inspector Naoki Tanaka appeared and snatched it off Jack's hands.

The trio then decided that the best way to find out what really happened during the night of the murder is to inspect the corpse of Chaiwit thus the trio headed to the morgue. However, just before they can investigate Chaiwit's corpse, it turned out that everyone which includes Jack, the Japanese police and Masaru's men were vying for the corpse with various reasons of their own. After a lengthy ploy and counters, Chaiwit's corpse was still left behind which gave both Qin and Noda a chance to examine the corpse. During the examination of the body, Qin and Noda both found that on top of being struck, Chaiwit was also stabbed with a broken shard of glass and with the positioning of the puncture wound, Chaiwit was stabbed from the back. They also found a needle prick in the victim's body, which was not reported in the autopsy report. From there, they deduced that Masaru was indeed lying like their initial thought and with Kobayashi being the first person who had charged into the room after the chaos, she should have seen something thus both Noda and Qin decided to question Kobayashi.

The trio headed to Kobayashi's apartment only to find out that her flat has been broken into and she has been kidnapped. Jack then barges into Kobayashi's apartment and started blaming the group for Kobayashi's disappearance. After a tussle with Tang and Noda, Jack decided to put their differences aside and work temporarily with the trio as they were on the same boat of investigating the same case. Thru the CCTV footage outside Kobayashi's apartment, the group managed to locate the suspect who had kidnapped Kobayashi and after a lengthy game set up by the kidnapper, only Tang and Qin made it through the challenges and found out where Kobayashi was kept. However, upon arriving, Tang and Qin noticed Kobayashi was already tied up with metal chains and chest deep in water. Just then, the kidnapper appeared and challenged Qin to a psychological match, stating that the valves that are pouring water into the well are connected to his pacemaker, and that the only way to save both Kobayashi and Tang, who had gone down to the well in an attempt to save Kobayashi, is to kill him as he's already a dead man walking. With time running out, Qin had no choice but to push the kidnapper down into the well, who then hit the concrete floor outside the water catchment area and died but in the process, as the kidnapper had stated, closed the water valves but this also caused Qin to be arrested for murder.

With Qin being incarcerated for the murder, Tang was sent back to Thailand on a boat to "lay low" and Jack had travelled to Suihua, Heilongjiang, China with both parties having left the country to gather better evidences and guidance on the case. Whilst in his cell, Qin had a nightmare which revealed that he did not actually pushed the kidnapper down but the kidnapper had jumped at his own volition after muttering to Qin with the words "Q says Hello" to him, signifying that the whole plot was devised by Q, the top detective of Crimaster. Qin the proceeds to deduce the whole murder plot again and after going thru multiple theories, he was interrupted by Naoki who revealed himself to also be part of Q with Qin subsequently realizing that Q isn't an individual person but a group of individuals with high IQ planning to use humanity itself to rewrite the established systems of the world. Naoki also revealed to Qin that the games that the four detectives were thrown into and Chaiwit's murder were all mixed together as a test to the detectives to find the next member of Q with only Qin passing the test. Naoki continued goading Qin which triggered Qin's visual stimulator and Qin remembered about the broken glass that was used to stab Chaiwit was still missing. Meanwhile, back in Thailand, Snow met with Tang and after showing the discrepancy between how the kidnapper had died versus how low of a probability of Qin pushing him to his death, Tang returned to Japan and the crime scene at the well to run tests with the assistance of Kiko in front of the prosecutor of Qin's case. Noda then appeared and revealed that prior to the four detectives even entertaining the games, he had sprayed a sort of invisible ink over the money and with Qin having a hand in handling them, his hand would have stained the kidnapper if he had pushed him to his death, but the kidnapper had none of the ink blots on his corpse, thus ruling out that Qin had actually pushed him to his death. Noda then revealed that both him and Qin had already guessed that the whole plot was orchestrated by Q and in order not to raise suspicion, both of them had to act dumb and unknowing of what was going on. With the hard evidence, Qin is released immediately and the party splits up with Tang and Qin rushing to the car that Chaiwit had died in, in order to find the missing glass shard that Qin had deduced to still be in the vehicle.

During the trial, Masaru was about to be sentenced but Qin managed to reach the courts in time and presented his investigation. He declared that the whole event was all done by Chaiwit himself as he had drugged Masaru's tea, goaded him into attacking Chaiwit whilst under the influence of the drug and after Masaru had passed out from the effect, Chaiwit then wanted Masaru to cause massive hurt to himself as a way to sell the ploy, but as Masaru was there for negotiations and did not bring his dagger with him into the meeting, Chaiwit had to improvise by smashing the glass divider and use a piece of the shattered glass to stab himself, causing a false flag situation on Masaru attempting to assassinate Chaiwit. Qin then went on and claimed that Chaiwit had initially survived his own stabbing but was eventually killed by Kobayashi herself after Chaiwit was left alone with her in the car. With the help of Kiko, they restructured the entire glass panel and declared that one piece of the shrapnel was missing from the scene and it was the final murder weapon used to assassinate Chaiwit. Just then, Tang barged into the courtroom holding the missing handkerchief and the missing glass shard as evidence to tie Kobayashi to the murder. However, in a twist of events, Masaru still pleaded guilty in murdering Chaiwit, confusing everyone. Just as another round of verdict was about to be read, Jack barged into the courtroom with new evidence he had collected from China. John had found out that Masaru was actually a Japanese war orphan abandoned in China after the defeat of the Japanese during WWII and Kobayashi was actually Masaru's daughter that he too had abandoned in order for a better life once he travelled back to Japan. Masaru then revealed that he did not intend to abandon Kobayashi and her mother but was forced to by his father and was dragged into a political marriage with the daughter of the then-boss of his current Yakuza organization in order to save his daughter's life. However, Kobayashi retorted that instead of saving her life, their lives were even more miserable once Masaru wasn't there to assist her mom and herself as they had lost their only pillar of support, and in order to feed a young Kobayashi, her mother had to resort to prostituting herself and even stealing which eventually landed her in jail and dying there. Kobayashi would eventually admit that driven by revenge of her mother's sufferings and death, Kobayashi planned to make her father suffer, by making him a suspect of the murder she had committed and she had used Chaiwit as a bridge to bring down Masaru.

With the arrest of Kobayashi and the acquittal of Masaru, the film ends with all the other detectives ranked under Q in Crimaster to be united against Q and fighting them.

== Cast ==
- Wang Baoqiang as Tang Ren (Chinese: 唐仁)
- Liu Haoran as Qin Feng (Chinese: 秦风)
- Satoshi Tsumabuki as Noda Hiroshi
- Tony Jaa as Jack Jaa
- Masami Nagasawa as Anna Kobayashi
- Tomokazu Miura as Masaru Watanabe
- Tadanobu Asano as Naoki Tanaka
- Yuxian Shang as Kiko
- Honami Suzuki as Yoshiko Kawamaru
- Shōta Sometani as Akira Murata
- Cheng Xiao as Lu Jingjing
- Zhang Zifeng as Snow

=== Cameos ===
- Andy Lau as 'Q' Leader
- Xiao Yang as Song Yi
- Janine Chang as Ivy
- Roy Chiu as Lin Mo
- Chen Zheyuan as Noda Koji
- Yoshinori Tashiro as a sumo wrestler

== Release ==
The film was initially planned for release in China for the 2020 Chinese New Year but the release was postponed due to the COVID-19 pandemic in China. The film was rescheduled and released on February 12, 2021.

Warner Bros. Pictures planned to distribute the film in select theaters in the United States on January 24, 2020, but the release was postponed likely for the same reasons as the initial delay in China. As of 2023, the film has not been released in the United States.

== Reception ==
=== Box office ===
Detective Chinatown 3 made RMB 673 million ($104 million) in advance tickets for its opening day and RMB 950 million ($147 million) for its first week, the highest amount ever in China beating Avengers: Endgame ($95.5 million) and resulting in a projected opening weekend of over $200 million. The film grossed $163 million (RMB 1.05 billion) on its first day of release, the biggest opening day in world history (beating Endgame's $157 million in North America) and pushing weekend projections to as high as $400 million. The film ended up debuting to RMB 2.56 billion ($398 million), becoming the biggest opening weekend ever in a single territory (beating Endgame's $357 million in April 2019). The film grossed over US$424 million in its opening weekend, making it the ninth-highest-grossing opening for a film. By the end of its second weekend the film had a running total of RMB 4.36 billion ($673 million), making it the fifth-highest-grossing film of 2021 and the sixth-highest-grossing non-English film of all time.

=== Critical response ===
Peter Bradshaw of The Guardian gave the film 3/5 stars, calling it "more no-holds-barred slapstick action". Todd McCarthy of Deadline Hollywood was less favorable, writing: "Its enormous box office numbers notwithstanding, I have to rate Detective Chinatown 3 as something of a disappointment after the raucously engaging first two entries." John Berra of Screen International gave the film a favorable review, writing that it "exudes a heightened zaniness which is most welcome in today's largely homogenised franchise landscape" and "is an insanely colourful, no expense spared blockbuster".

Chinese audiences on Maoyan gave the film a 8.8/10, while those on Douban gave it an average score of 5.6.

== Sequel ==
=== Detective Chinatown 4 ===
Just like the previous entries in the Detective Chinatown series, the next story location is teased at the end of each film. At the conclusion of the latest instalment, we are finally introduced to the villainous group known as 'Q'. This group is composed of previous villains from the Detective Chinatown universe, including Song Yi (Xiao Yang) from Detective Chinatown 2, Ivy (Janine Chang) from the Detective Chinatown (Web Series), and Naoki Tanaka (Tadanobu Asano) from Detective Chinatown 3. The leader of 'Q' is portrayed by Andy Lau. It is then revealed that the group is based in London, England, hinting that this will be the next location our main characters will visit.

=== Web Series ===
Prior to the original release date during the Chinese New Year season of 2020, a web series that follows the events after the first Detective Chinatown film premiered on January 1, 2020. This series introduces three new detectives: Lin Mo (Roy Chiu), Sa Sha (Zhang Yishang), and Noda Koji (Chen Zheyuan). It delves deeper into the intricate mysteries and cases that run concurrently with the events of Detective Chinatown 2 and Detective Chinatown 3. Following the series, both Lin Mo and Noda Koji make cameo appearances in the third film, Detective Chinatown 3.

In February 2024, a second season of the web series was produced, featuring the return of Kiko (Yuxian Shang) from Detective Chinatown 2. She reprises her role as one of the main protagonists, with the show expanding on her motives and backstory as a character.

== Prequel ==
On April 24, 2024, at the 13th Beijing International Film Festival director Chen Sicheng announced that production has moved forward with the next film in the Detective Chinatown series. The film Detective Chinatown 1900 serves as a prequel to the series, set during the Qing Dynasty in city of San Francisco, California. It introduces a new, standalone story, separate from the events of the previous films. The plot centers on a mysterious murder of a woman in Chinatown, San Francisco, with suspicion falling on a Chinese man, leading to public outrage and demands to shut down the neighborhood. Amid this turmoil, Chinese medicine practitioner Qin Fu (Liu Haoran) and his companion Ah Gui (Wang Baoqiang) become entangled in the case. As they navigate a tense, time-sensitive investigation, the duo engages in a battle of wits and courage to uncover the true culprit behind the crime. Shooting started in the middle of July in Qingdao and Shanghai, China and wrapped mid-October. The film's cast is also set to feature American actor John Cusack and renowned Hong Kong actor Chow Yun-fat.
