= Weaning (TV series) =

- Taiwan DVD cover
- Traditional Chinese: 斷奶
- Simplified Chinese: 断奶
- Hanyu Pinyin: duànnǎi
- Written by: Qing Hua; Zhang Jie
- Directed by: Li Li'an
- Starring: Tong Liya; Lei Jiayin; Lin Yuan; Luo Jin; Ma Ge
- Country of origin: China
- Original language: Mandarin
- No. of episodes: 30

Production
- Running time: 45 minutes

Weaning is a 2013 Chinese romance/family TV series starring Tong Liya and Lei Jiayin. While a love story at heart, the show also explores the Chinese issue of overprotective parents and overdependent children (some of whom need to be "weaned" in their 30s).

== Ratings ==
Dragon TV CSM46 ratings
| Original broadcast date | Episode (%) | Ratings (%) | Audience share (%) | Rank |
|---|---|---|---|---|
| May 28, 2013 | 1-3 | 0.700 | 1.96 | 6 |
| May 29, 2013 | 4-6 | 0.710 | 1.98 | 5 |
| May 30, 2013 | 7-9 | 0.788 | 2.24 | 2 |
| May 31, 2013 | 10-12 | 0.718 | 2.06 | 2 |
| June 1, 2013 | 13-14 | 0.709 | 2.04 | 2 |
| June 2, 2013 | 15-16 | 0.782 | 2.25 | 3 |
| June 3, 2013 | 17-19 | 0.833 | 2.42 | 2 |
| June 4, 2013 | 20-22 | 0.856 | 2.45 | 2 |
| June 5, 2013 | 23-25 | 1.077 | 3.01 | 2 |
| June 6, 2013 | 26-28 | 0.965 | 2.72 | 2 |
| June 7, 2013 | 29-31 | 1.049 | 2.98 | 1 |
| June 8, 2013 | 32-33 | 0.918 | 2.57 | 1 |

== Broadcast ==
- China

- Regional (terrestrial) channels: Tianjin Television (April 26, 2013), Wuhan Television (April 26, 2013), Shaanxi Television (May 3, 2013), Shandong Television (May 5, 2013), Heilongjiang Television (May 2013), Henan Television (May 2013), Shanghai Television (September 5, 2013, dubbed in Shanghainese), etc.
- National (satellite) channels: Dragon Television (May 28, 2013), Hebei Television (July 11, 2013)

- United States: KSCI (March 10, 2014)
- Taiwan: TNTV (June 2, 2014)

== Awards ==
- 2014 13th Huading Awards
  - Won—Best Actress in a Television Series, Tong Liya
  - Nominated—Best Actor in a Contemporary Drama Series, Lei Jiayin

== See also ==
- How Long Will I Love U, a 2018 film starring Lei and Tong
