= Ma Jian (basketball) =

Chinese basketball player

Ma Jian 马健
Personal information
- Born: 20 August 1969 (age 57) Shijiazhuang, Hebei, China
- Listed height: 6 ft 7 in (2.01 m)
- Listed weight: 220 lb (100 kg)

Career information
- College: Utah Valley Community College (junior); University of Utah
- Playing career: 1985–2003

Career history
- 1995–1996: Hapee Cavity Fighters
- 1997: Beijing Ducks
- 1998–2001: Beijing Olympians
- 2002–2003: Shanghai Sharks
Medals
Men's basketball
Representing China
Asian Games
Gold medal – first place	1990 Beijing
FIBA Under-18 Asia Cup
Gold medal – first place	1989 Manila

Ma Jian (simplified Chinese: 马健; traditional Chinese: 馬健; pinyin: Mǎ Jiàn; born 20 August 1969 in Shijiazhuang, Hebei) is a former professional basketball player from China. He is known for playing college basketball in the United States and was among the first Chinese nationals to play competitive basketball in the United States.

== Early life ==
Ma was one of two children born to 6'3" basketball coach Ma Deichai and 5'4" Zhang Yumin in Tianjin. At 16 years old, he wanted to become a basketball player. He attended a basketball camp conducted by Jim Harrick, the head coach for the UCLA Bruins.

== College career ==
In 1992, Ma came to the US. He was recruited by Harrick to play for UCLA, but he failed the entrance exam due to his lack of fluency in English. He would instead play for junior college Utah Valley Community College after completing a year at a Chinese university. In 1992, he averaged 17.9 points and five rebounds.

Ma then transferred to play college basketball for two years with the University of Utah. This made him the first Chinese to play in the NCAA D-1. In his first season under Rick Majerus, he averaged 8.7 points and 3.7 rebounds while starting all but one of Utah's 28 games. However, a lack of communication between them led to Ma only averaging 3.4 points, 1.9 rebounds, and 2.5 assists with only three starts. In his final home game with Utah, Majerus delivered a tribute to him in Mandarin.

== Professional career ==
Attempting to break into the NBA, Ma was able to play exhibition games with the Phoenix Suns and the Los Angeles Clippers in the team's summer-league programs in 1994. He was among the final cuts for the 1995–96 Clippers roster, but he did not feature in any regular games for the Clippers. He attempted to return to China to play in the Chinese Basketball Association (CBA), but the CBA refused to let him in.

Ma had a brief stint in the Philippines, playing for the Hapee Cavity Fighters of the Philippine Basketball League (PBL). He helped Hapee clinch the 1996 PBL Reinforced Conference title – the first for the franchise. He was popular in the Philippines, with many Filipino-Chinese fans watching his games live.

He later returned to China to play for the Beijing Olympians of the CBA, until he left during and sued them. He then signed a one-year contract with the Shanghai Sharks. In 2003, he signed with the Jilin Northeast Tigers to return to the Philippines, as the team competed at the 2003 PBA Invitational championship. They were winless in that tournament.

== National team career ==
Ma first made the China men's national under-19 basketball team in 1986. He then competed in the 1990 Asian Games and the 1992 Summer Olympics for the Chinese men's national basketball team. During the 1992 Olympics, he was benched as China lost all of its games due to political reason. He then turned down the decision to play in the 1996 Summer Olympics as he was still trying to make the roster for the Clippers. His decision to pursue a career in the United States reportedly led to his exclusion to the Chinese national team.

== Personal life ==
Ma is married to Simiko Takahashi, a Japanese-American. They have two sons. His only brother, Ma Ming, attempted to play college basketball in the Philippines for Ateneo, but after failing math, became a Nike executive and now runs his own sports agency. He has a sports foundation, named after him, that focuses on sports education. After retiring, he became a basketball commentator on television, and covered the 2008 Olympics. He had previously covered Game 5 of the 1997 NBA Finals on Chinese television.

== Filmography ==
Year	English title	Chinese title	Role	Notes
2010	Lost on Journey	人在囧途	Vendor	
2010	Welcome to Shama Town	决战刹马镇	Gui Zhong	
2010	Seven Arhat	七小罗汉	Big Idiot	
2010	You Deserve to Be Single	活该你单身	Bald patient	
2011	The Founding of a Party	建黨偉業	School janitor	
2012	The Assassins	銅雀臺	Guard commander	
