= Seven Arhat =

- Film poster
- Traditional Chinese: 七小羅漢
- Simplified Chinese: 七小罗汉
- Hanyu Pinyin: Qī Xiǎoluóhàn
- Directed by: Fu Huayang
- Written by: Ning Caishen
- Produced by: Fu Huayang
- Starring: Eric Tsang; Chen Sicheng; Wang Hao; Zhang Zhen; Jia Huijing; Wang Jing; Zhao Yilong
- Cinematography: Kuang Tinghe
- Edited by: Mai Zishan
- Production company: China Film Group
- Distributed by: China Film Group
- Release date: 23 July 2010
- Running time: 86 minutes
- Country: China
- Language: Mandarin

Seven Arhat (Chinese: 七小罗汉) is a 2010 Chinese action comedy film directed and produced by Fu Huayang and written by Ning Caishen. The film stars Eric Tsang, Chen Sicheng, Wang Hao, Zhang Zhen, Jia Huijing, Wang Jing, and Zhao Yilong. It picks up the story of Master Xiuxiu and his seven disciples protecting the treasure in the Buddhist temple. The film premiered in China on July 23, 2010.

== Plot ==
Master Xiuxiu (Eric Tsang) and his seven disciples lives in a Buddhist temple in a deep mountain. The temple preserves a golden armour of Xiang Yu. On weekdays, Master Xiuxiu and his seven disciples practise Shaolin Boxing.

One day, Master Xiuxiu goes downhill to cure a patient. The Gang of Four, namely the "Nine Tattooed Dragons", "Xiaowu", the "eccentric scientist" and "Big Fool", come to the temple to capture the golden armour. They suffered a crushing defeat at the hands of the seven disciples. In desperation, the "Nine Tattooed Dragons" demolished the temple and takes Fa as the hostage. Then he flees to the cave where the golden armour hide. After putting on the golden armour he thinks he is invulnerable. But he is defeated by the seven disciples.

== Cast ==
- Eric Tsang as Master Xiuxiu (休休大师)
- Chen Sicheng as Nine Tattooed Dragons (九纹龙)
- Wang Hao as Duo (哆)
- Zhang Zhen as Lai (来)
- Jia Huijing as Mi (咪)
- Wang Jing as Fa (发)
- Zhao Yilong as Suo (嗦)
- Wang Yidong as La (啦)
- Fu Jiayuan as Xi (西)
- Niu Mengmeng as Xiaowu (小巫)
- Wang dongfang as the eccentric scientist
- Ma Jian as Big Fool (大傻)

== Production ==
According to director Fu Huayang's statement, the film pays homage to Akira Kurosawa's Seven Samurai.

The film took place in Mount Song of Henan.

== Release ==
The film was released on 23 July 2010 in China.

=== Reception ===
The film received mainly negative reviews. Douban gave the film 4.9 out of 10.

=== Box office ===
The film's opening day gross was 1.56 million yuan ($0.24 million), and earned a total of 5.18 million yuan ($0.8179 million) on its first weekend.
