= Detective Chinatown 2 =

2018 film by Chen Sicheng

- Theatrical release poster
- Chinese: 唐人街探案 2
- Hanyu Pinyin: Tángrénjiē Tàn Àn 2
- Directed by: Chen Sicheng
- Written by: Chen Sicheng; Cheng Jiake; Yan Yining; Lian Zhou; Zhang Chun; Gao Lifeng
- Produced by: Chen Sengoi; Eileen Ling Gong; Sun Tao; Wang Haipeng; Ling Hong; Shawn Xiang Yue; John Zheng
- Starring: Wang Baoqiang; Liu Haoran
- Cinematography: Du Jie
- Edited by: Tang Hongjia
- Music by: Nathan Wang
- Production companies: MM2 Entertainment; Wanda Pictures; Wuzhou Film Distribution; Warner Bros. Pictures (United States only)
- Distributed by: Wuzhou Film Distribution; Wanda Pictures; Tao Piao Piao; Huaxia Film Distribution; Warner Bros. Pictures (United States only)
- Release date: 16 February 2018 (China)
- Running time: 121 minutes
- Country: China
- Language: Mandarin
- Budget: RMB 400 million ($63 million)
- Box office: $544 million

Detective Chinatown 2 (Chinese: 唐人街探案 2) is a 2018 Chinese comedy-mystery buddy film directed and written by Chen Sicheng, starring Wang Baoqiang and Liu Haoran. A sequel to 2015's Detective Chinatown, the film was released in China on 16 February 2018. It has grossed US$544 million worldwide, making it the fifth-highest-grossing film of all time in China.

A sequel, Detective Chinatown 3, was released on 12 February 2021.

== Plot ==
Qin Feng thought he was going to attend his distant uncle Tang Ren's wedding, which turned out to be a hoax. Tang Ren had deceived Qin Feng to come to New York for another purpose.

The godfather of Chinatown, Uncle Qi, gathered the world's best detectives from an app called Crimaster (which allows real detectives to upload their cases for the online community to solve them) and sets up a competition to locate his grandson's killer within one week for a reward of five million dollars. His grandson Jason was found in a temple with his heart torn out and an unknown symbol on a table near him.

Unexpectedly, Qin Feng, the world's second-top detective and the world's third-top detective noticed another similar murder in the Hudson River one week before the investigation began. A white woman was also killed but lost her kidney. The two men pulled out surveillance videos of the two crime scenes and found that a man appeared at both crime scenes. They identify the man as Song Yi. However, after observing that Song Yi is right-handed, Qin Feng concludes that he could not be the killer since evidence suggests that the killer is left-handed. While Qin Feng and Tang Ren knew that Song Yi was not the killer, this was not everyone else's consensus, and so the duo had to clear Song Yi's name and find the real killer.

Eventually, with the help of Tang Ren's knowledge of Feng shui and Wu Xing, Qin Feng discovered the killer's motive. Due to the unique location of the murders, the time of the crimes, the eight characters of the victims' birthdays and the organs, he concluded the whole of New York was being used as an altar.(the elements fire, water, wood, metal, and earth were used to determine the locations, date, and the respective organ to be removed)

Finally, they find out that the doctor who was battling cancer believed that doing ancient Taoist rituals could grant him immortality, and was behind the murders. The doctor kills himself after being found out.

Qin Feng deduces that Song Yi is actually the mysterious man "Q", the top-ranked detective of Crimaster. Song Yi solved the case very early on and used the doctor's patterns to cover up his own murder of a sex trafficking ringleader who abducted his sister. Qin Feng lets him go, but later KIKO reveals that "Q"'s IP address does not locate him in America, making Song Yi as "Q" unlikely. "Q" is therefore still at large.

== Cast ==
- Wang Baoqiang as Tang Ren (Chinese: 唐仁), Qin Feng's distant uncle and a Thai-Chinese swindler who comes to New York to solve a real case.
- Liu Haoran as Qin Feng (Chinese: 秦风), Tang Ren's nephew and one of the best detectives of the world. He's the world's second-top detective in the ranking of Crimaster (an app which allows real detectives to upload their cases for the online community to solve them).
- Xiao Yang as Song Yi (Chinese: 宋义), a man who is the main suspect of the murder of Uncle Qi's nephew and one of the suspects of being the Q, the top-ranked detective of Crimaster.
- Natasha Liu Bordizzo as Officer Chen Ying (Chinese: 陈英), a Chinese-American NYPD detective and Tang Ren's love interest.
- Shang Yuxian as KIKO, a hacker from Hong Kong who specializes in solving cases by hacking the police database and stealing them and the #5 of Crimaster. Her nickname is "Ultimate Computer Hacker" and she is Qin Feng's love interest.
- Brett Azar as Wild Bull Billy, a tough detective from United States and a veteran from U.S. Army. He's the #9 of Crimaster and is notorious for using extreme violence and brute force to solve crimes.
- Bai Ling as Aaimali Kunana, a crazy psychic detective from Indonesia and the #7 of Crimaster. She is famous for using psychic and supernatural skills to solve cases.
- Benja Kay Thomas as Detective Charlene the Church Lady! She is famous for her Kung Fu skills.
- Wang Xun as Lu Guofu (Chinese: 陆国富)
- Yang Jinci as Malian (Horse-like face) (Chinese: 马脸)
- Yuen Wah as Mou Jau-kin (Chinese: 莫友乾)
- Satoshi Tsumabuki as Hiroshi Noda (Chinese: 野田宏/Nihongo: 野田浩, Noda Hiroshi), the top detective from Japan and the #3 of Crimaster. He is considered the main rival of the protagonist Qin Feng, due to his almost perfect investigative skills, which displeases Qin Feng.
- Michael Pitt as Dr. James Springfield
- Kenneth Tsang as Qishu (Uncle Qi), the Godfather of Chinatown and the dragonhead of the local Chinese mafia.

== Production ==
Filming lasted for 40 days in New York City.

== Reception ==
=== Box office ===
Detective Chinatown 2 earned $541 million in China, and $3 million in other countries, for a worldwide total of $544 million.

=== Critical response ===
On review aggregator website Rotten Tomatoes, the film has an approval rating of 54% based on 13 reviews, and an average rating of 5.1/10. On Metacritic, which assigns a normalized rating, the film has a weighted average score of 48 out of 100, based on five critics, indicating "mixed or average reviews". Users on the Chinese site Douban gave the film an average rating of 6.7/10, while those at Tianjin Maoyan Culture Media gave it a 9.0 rating.

=== Awards and nominations ===
Award ceremony	Category	Recipient(s)	Result	Ref
25th Beijing College Student Film Festival	Students' Choice Award for Favorite Film	Detective Chinatown 2	Won	
34th Hundred Flowers Awards	Best Picture	Detective Chinatown 2	Nominated	
34th Hundred Flowers Awards	Best Director	Chen Sicheng	Nominated	
34th Hundred Flowers Awards	Best Writing	Chen Sicheng	Nominated	
34th Hundred Flowers Awards	Best Actor	Liu Haoran	Nominated	
34th Hundred Flowers Awards	Best Newcomer	Shang Yuxian	Nominated	
4th Jackie Chan Action Movie Awards	Best Action Stuntman	Long Cuilong	Won	
4th Jackie Chan Action Movie Awards	Best Action Choreographer	Wu Gang	Won	

== Sequel ==
=== Detective Chinatown 3 ===
A sequel, Detective Chinatown 3, also written and directed by Chen Sicheng and set in Tokyo's Chinatown, was scheduled to be released during the Chinese New Year holiday season in 2020, however due to the outbreak of the COVID-19 pandemic on the eve of the Spring Festival, the film was withdrawn from the schedule. It was finally released on February 12, 2021, the first day of the Lunar New Year in 2021. In addition of the two leads of Wang Baoqiang and Liu Haoran reprising their roles, new supporting cast members in Detective Chinatown 3 include Satoshi Tsumabuki, Tony Jaa, Tadanobu Asano, Masami Nagasawa, and Tomokazu Miura.

=== Web Series ===
Premiering in January 2020, a web series starring Lin Mo (Roy Chiu) and Sa Sha (Zhang Yishang) expanded the Detective Chinatown universe. Following the events of the first Detective Chinatown film this series introduces new detectives and delves deeper into the intricate mysteries and cases that run concurrently with the events of the Detective Chinatown films. In February 2024 a second season was also produced, featuring the return of Kiko (Yuxian Shang) from Detective Chinatown 2, who reprises her role as one of the main protagonists of the show. Both seasons were made available exclusively on the subscription video on-demand over-the-top streaming service iQIYI.
