= Beijing Love Story (film) =

- Film poster
- Traditional Chinese: 北京愛情故事
- Simplified Chinese: 北京爱情故事
- Hanyu Pinyin: Běi Jīng Ài Qíng Gù Shì
- Jyutping: Bak1 Ging1 Ngoi3 Cing4 Gu2 Si6
- Directed by: Chen Sicheng
- Written by: Chen Sicheng
- Based on: Beijing Love Story
- Produced by: Li Yaping
- Starring: Tony Leung; Carina Lau; Wang Xuebing; Yu Nan; Chen Sicheng; Tong Liya; Wang Qingxiang; Siqin Gaowa; Liu Haoran; Nana Ou-Yang
- Cinematography: Song Xiaofei
- Production company: Wanda Pictures
- Release date: 13 February 2014 (China)
- Country: China
- Language: Mandarin
- Box office: US$67.6 million (international)

Beijing Love Story is a 2014 Chinese romance film written and directed by Chen Sicheng adapted from the 2012 Chinese TV series of the same name which was also written and directed by Chen. The film is Chen's film directorial debut. It stars returning cast members Chen and Tong Liya from the TV series alongside new cast members Tony Leung Ka-fai, Carina Lau, Wang Xuebing, Yu Nan, Wang Qingxiang, Siqin Gaowa, Liu Haoran and Nana Ouyang. Despite the same title and sharing the same writer, director and some stars as the TV series, the film is not a continuation of the series and features a new story and characters. It was released on 13 February 2014.

== Synopsis ==
The movie tells the stories of five pairs of lovers, each from a different period of their lives. All five couples, though different in age and circumstance, are somehow linked to one another. Their stories all demonstrate the imperfection of love. Designer Chen Feng (Chen) falls in love with Shen Yan (Tong Liya) at a friend's bachelor party, but finds that he might be too poor to sustain a relationship with her. Chen's boss (Wang Xuebing) cheats with alarming regularity on his dutiful wife (Yu Nan). Vengeful wife tries to cheat with her own employer (Leung), who in turns jets off to Greece for a decadent rendezvous with his mistress (Lau). A young man (Liu Haoran) pines after his cello-playing classmate (Ouyang Nana). His grandfather (Wang Qingxiang) goes on a series of blind dates set up by choir teacher Mrs Gao (Siqin Gaowa).

== Cast ==
- Tony Leung Ka-fai as Liu Hui (劉輝)
- Carina Lau as Jia Ling (佳玲)
- Wang Xuebing as Wu Zheng (吳崢)
- Yu Nan as Zhang Lei (張蕾)
- Chen Sicheng as Chen Feng (陳鋒)
- Tong Liya as Shen Yan (沈彥)
- Wang Qingxiang
- Siqin Gaowa
- Liu Haoran
- Nana Ou-Yang
- Elaine Jin
- Geng Le
- Guo Jingfei
- Wang Zhifei as Tang Bin (唐斌)

== Reception ==
February 14, 2014, according to incomplete statistics, "Beijing love story" achieved 1.02 million box offices according to the box office charts during nationwide day of the summit, plus 20 million views before the official movie came out, as of February 14, the film "Beijing Love Story"has created five new historical record: Mainland Chinese film history 2D slices highest score, 2D highest grossing Chinese film days, Mainland film history Valentine's Day romance highest grossing, fastest billions of dollars of Chinese history romance, 14:00 Mainland highest grossing movie released. March 8, the film "Beijing love story" box office exceeded 400 million. As of 15 February, it had grossed CN¥117 million and it reached US$65.31 million. The film earned a total of US$67.6 million internationally.
