= Nirvana in Fire 2 =

- Promotional poster
- Also known as: Nirvana in Fire: The Wind Blows in Chang Lin
- Traditional Chinese: 瑯琊榜之風起長林
- Simplified Chinese: 琅琊榜之风起长林
- Hanyu Pinyin: Lángyábǎng Zhī Fēngqǐ Chánglín
- Genre: Wuxia; Historical fiction Politics
- Written by: Hai Yan
- Directed by: Kong Sheng; Li Xue
- Starring: Huang Xiaoming; Liu Haoran; Tong Liya; Zhang Huiwen
- Country of origin: China
- Original language: Chinese
- No. of episodes: 50

Production
- Executive producer: Hou Hongliang
- Production locations: Hengdian World Studios; Mongol
- Running time: 45 minutes
- Production companies: Daylight Entertainment iQiyi Pictures

Original release
- Network: Dragon TV, Beijing TV
- Release: 18 December 2017 – 12 February 2018

Related
- Nirvana in Fire

Nirvana in Fire 2 (Chinese: 琅琊榜之风起长林) is a 2017 Chinese television series starring Huang Xiaoming, Liu Haoran, Tong Liya and Zhang Huiwen. It is the sequel to Nirvana in Fire, which is based on Hai Yan's novel with the same name. The stories take place after the events of the original series, which revolves around the Langya Hall. The series aired on Dragon TV and Beijing TV from December 18, 2017 to February 12, 2018.

Although the series has earned a Douban score of 8.5 from more than 144,766 user reviews, Nirvana in Fire 2 did not achieve the same success in ratings compared to the first season. Some cited the show's slow start and detached nature from first season's plot/characters as reasons for its lower popularity.

== Synopsis ==
During the chaotic Northern and Southern Dynasties, the northern frontier of the Liang Dynasty is protected by the powerful Changlin Army led by Xiao Tingsheng (Sun Chun) and Xiao Pingzhang (Huang Xiaoming). During an expedition, Grand Secretary Xun Baishui (Bi Yanjun) cuts off supplies to the front line, and Xiao Pingzhang becomes severely wounded as he leads the defense on Liang's northern border. His younger brother, Xiao Pingjing (Liu Haoran), leaves Langya Pavilion to visit him. There, Xiao Pingzhang and his father, Xiao Tingsheng, send Xiao Pingjing to where the supply ships sank in order to get to the bottom of the conspiracy. Unbeknownst to Xiao Pingjing, Xiao Tingsheng and his friend, Master Li, also send Lin Xi (Zhang Huiwen) to the same city, so that she can assist Xiao Pingjing.

It turns out that 30 years ago, Ye Qin, a neighboring kingdom, was suffering from the plague, yet Liang kept its borders shut for self-protection. In order to take revenge for his fallen kingdom, Puyang Ying (Guo Jingfei) travels to Liang under a hidden identity, and colludes with top martial artist the Marquis of Mozi (Cheng Taishen) and Xun Baishui to weaken the Xiao Family’s power. To exact revenge, he tricks the Empress into mandating an order to poison two cities in Liang, thereby recreating the conditions of the plague his kingdom suffered from.

Xiao Pingzhang dies from Puyang Ying's poison during the war, and a year later, the Liang Emperor (Liu Jun) passes away from sickness. His son, Xiao Yuanshi ascends the throne as a child emperor guided by Xiao Tingsheng. The Yu Dynasty takes the chance to gather forces to invade, and Xiao Pingjing plans a preemptive attack to defeat the Yu's army. Learning of these plans from Xiao Yuanqi, Xun Baishui coaxes the new Emperor (Hu Xianxu) into releasing an edict banning the Changlin Army from going into battle. Xiao Pingjing violates the edict, and he destroys Yu's army, ensuring that Liang would be safe from the Yu in the north. Upon his return to the capital, Xiao Pingjing's father, Xiao Tingsheng passes away due to his deteriorating health. Xiao Pingjing finally succumbs to the grief caused by the death of his brother and his father, and he leaves the capital to return to Langya Pavilion.

Years go by and Xiao Yuanqi begins to gain recognition and power from defeating the Donghai Army and reclaiming 7 of 10 eastern areas that were captured. In reality, those victories were planned by the Marquis of Mozi, who became the ruler of the Donghai. The Marquis of Mozi coordinated with Xiao Yuanqi so that Xiao Yuanqi could gain recognition from creating the impression that he recaptured lost territories for the Liang. After using assassins sent by Marquis of Mozi to kill Grand Secretary Xun Baishui, Xiao Yuanqi severs his relationship with the Marquis of Mozi by killing all the assassins that the Marquis of Mozi have sent to help him. Without Xun Baishui to rival his influence in the capital, Xiao Yuanqi stages a rebellion against Xiao Yuanshi. Xiao Pingjing predicts the danger against Yuanshi and he gathers the disbanded Changlin Army to march on Yuanqi's army that has occupied the capital and taken Yuanshi hostage. Ultimately, Pingjing defeats Yuanqi, and Pingjing leaves the capital to live his life with Lin Xi.

== Cast ==
=== Main ===
- Huang Xiaoming as Xiao Pingzhang
- Liu Haoran as Xiao Pingjing
- Tong Liya as Meng Qianxue
- Zhang Huiwen as Lin Xi
- Wu Haochen as Xiao Yuanqi, Marquis Laiyang

=== Supporting ===
Liang Imperial Family

- Liu Jun as the Emperor
- Mei Ting as Empress Xun
- Hu Xianxu as Xiao Yuanshi, Crown Prince
- Sun Chun as Xiao Tingsheng, Prince Changlin
- Li Bin as Xiao Jingting, Prince Ning
- Wen Jing as Consort Shu
- Liu Lin as Princess Dowager Laiyang
- Qiao Xin as Xun Anru

Liang Imperial Court

- Zhang Bo as Xun Feizhan
- Bi Yanjun as Xun Baishui
- Guo Jingfei as Puyang Ying
- You Yong as Song Fu
- Yue Yang as Prefect Zhang
- Feng Qian as Li Gu
- Xia Fan as Dong Qing
- Dong Yuelin as Ji Chen
- Jin Zehao as Yue Yinchuan
- Zhang Juanyi as Tan Heng
- Chen Muyang as Di Ming
- Shao Weitong as He Cheng

Others

- Cheng Taishen as Marquis Mozi
- Wang Qingxiang as Lin Chen
- Jia Yuanyuan as Head Aunt
- Zhang Yanyan as Sister Yun
- Zhang Haowei as Lin Jiu
- Wang Yongquan as Old Master Li
- Feng Hui as Lin Shen
- Xing Minshan as Duan Tongzhou
- Wei Zhi as Prince Hui
- Zhao Da as Tuoba Yu
- Shi Shi as Princess Tuoba Chonghua
- Jin Song as Qin Lingshuo, Prince Kang
- Tan Kai as Ruan Ying
- Zhu Mengyao as Pei'er
- Chao Haowei as Lu Zhao
- Zhang Lingxin as Lady Qi

== Production ==
In early 2016, producer Hou Hongliang had confirmed though interviews that a sequel to Nirvana in Fire would probably include a new cast of characters and story, while retaining the backdrop of Langya Hall. Wei Wei, the Nirvana in Fire casting director, confirmed on Sina Weibo in July 2016 that a sequel to the acclaimed drama had entered pre-production and would begin filming in November. The series is set to air exclusively via streaming website iQiyi. The main cast was unveiled in October 2016, with the rest of the supporting cast announced later in December.

On December 15, the cast and production crew officially began filming at Hengdian Studios. Filming lasted for 5 months and ended in May 2017 at Mongolia before finally entering post-production.

In March 2017, Daylight Entertainment announced that the series would be showcased at the Entertainment Expo Hong Kong. The first teaser video was unveiled in June 2017 via iQiyi's conference, with an estimated premiere date at the end of 2017.

== Original soundtrack ==
Nirvana in Fire 2 Original Soundtrack (OST)

Soundtrack album by Meng Ke/Lu Liang
- Released: January 8, 2018
- Genre: Mandopop; Instrumental
- Language: Mandarin
- Label: Xingwen Jiayi
- Producer: Meng Ke; Lu Liang

The Nirvana in Fire 2 OST album was released on January 8, 2018, with music composed by Meng Ke, season 1's main composer, and Lu Liang. The drama's theme song "Qing Ping Yuan (清平愿)", which was composed by Dong Suoda and written by Hai Yan, was not included in the album.

琅琊榜之风起长林 电视剧原声带配乐专辑 Nirvana in Fire 2 soundtrack

No.	Title	Lyrics	Music	Singers	Length
1.	"Fly High Changlin (风起长林)"		Meng Ke, Lu Liang		1:29
2.	"Xiao Family (萧家)"				2:47
3.	"Wind (风)"				1:58
4.	"Travel (远行)"				1:52
5.	"Hot Blood (热血)"				1:10
6.	"Worry (伤感)"				1:13
7.	"Lin Chen's Letter (蔺晨之信)"				1:51
8.	"Emotional Interweave (情感交织)"				0:41
9.	"Sadness (忧伤)"				1:38
10.	"Reproduction of Season 1 Theme (第一部主题再现)"				0:43
11.	"Longing (思念)"				0:40
12.	"Chang Lin General (长林军)"				2:58
13.	"Expedition (出征)"				2:31
14.	"Chang Lin Boy (长林男儿)"				2:31
15.	"Tragedy (悲壮)"				2:57
16.	"Battle to the Death (战死)"				2:33
17.	"Final Battle (最后的决战)"				3:17
18.	"Heroic (英勇)"				2:02
19.	"Opponents (对战)"				2:09
20.	"Fighting (战斗)"				2:27
21.	"Desolate (苍凉)"				3:19
22.	"Latent Crisis (潜藏危机)"				3:48
23.	"Love (爱意)"				2:17
24.	"Poignant (凄美)"				2:25
25.	"Lonely (孤独)"				2:15
26.	"Parting (离别)"				3:19
27.	"Low (低落)"				4:09
28.	"Desolation (凄凉)"				2:56
29.	"Distant (悠远)"				1:55
30.	"Trap (圈套)"				3:13
31.	"Qing Ping Yuan (清平愿)"	Hai Yan	Dong Suoda	Huang Qishan (version 1), Duo Liang (version 2)	4:06

== Awards and nominations ==
Year	Award	Category	Nominee	Result	Ref.
2018	24th Shanghai Television Festival	Best Television Series	Nirvana in Fire 2	Nominated	
2018	24th Shanghai Television Festival	Best Director	Kong Sheng, Li Xue	Nominated	
2018	24th Shanghai Television Festival	Best Cinematography	Sun Molong	Nominated	
