= Great Expectations (2018 TV series) =

- Genre: Drama; Period
- Written by: Chen Sicheng
- Directed by: Xie Ze; Chen Xitai
- Starring: Chen Sicheng; Yuan Hong; Tong Liya; Amber Kuo
- Country of origin: China
- Original language: Mandarin
- No. of seasons: 1
- No. of episodes: 48

Production
- Production locations: Shanghai; Xiangshan; Hengdian World Studios
- Running time: 45 mins
- Production companies: Mango Studios; Wukong Culture Media; Shanghai Shine Asia
- Budget: $55.5 million

Original release
- Network: Hunan TV
- Release: April 1 – April 29, 2018

Great Expectations (Chinese: 远大前程) is a 2018 Chinese television series starring written by Chen Sicheng, starring himself alongside Yuan Hong, Tong Liya and Amber Kuo. The series airs on Hunan TV starting April 1, 2018.

== Synopsis ==
The story is set in the 20th century, and follows Hong Sanyuan who travels (from their hometown in Suzhou Province) to Shanghai together with his foster mother, and adopted younger brother and close friend Qi Lin, to seek a better life. There, he came under the guidance of Yan Hua, a ferry worker who is seen as the leader by his contemporaries. In Shanghai, Hong Sanyuan becomes entangled in power struggles between two large conglomerates, and eventually also gets involved in greater political affairs, especially between the KMT & CPC.

== Cast ==
=== Main ===
Actor	Character	Introduction
Chen Sicheng	Hong Sanyuan	A street hooligan who is drawn into the feudal conflicts of powerful tycoons in Shanghai.
Yuan Hong	Qi Lin	Hong Sanyuan's good friend.
Tong Liya	Lin Yiyi	A girl seeking revenge for her father.
Amber Kuo	Yu Mengzhu	Daughter of the wealthiest man in Shanghai. She is forward-thinking and independent.
Zhao Lixin	Du Yusheng	One of the top three tycoons in Shanghai. Third boss of Yongxin Company. Hong Sanyuan's teacher.
Ni Dahong	Huo Tianhong	One of the top three tycoons in Shanghai. Big boss of Yongxin Company.
Liu Yijun	Zhang Wanlin	One of the top three tycoons in Shanghai. Second boss of Yongxin Company. Qi Lin's teacher.

=== Supporting ===
Actor	Character	Introduction
Rebecca Jane Todd	Yi Sha/Isa	Huo Dun/Horton's daughter. A Holy Nun of the Church. Love interest of Hong Sanyuan.
Guo Jinglin	Xia Junlin	Adviser of Yongxin Company. One of the experts of Thirteen Taibao. A cunning and cruel man.
Fu Dalong	Yan Hua	An exemplary ferry worker who is seen as a leader by his colleagues. After being saved by Liang Xingyi, he joins the Communist Party.
Chen Taisheng	Liang Xingyi	A passionate communist who helps spread the ideals to comrades.
Tan Kai	Shen Da	Department Chief of Shanghai Municipal Police. Hong Sanyuan's sworn brother.
Li Nian	Lu Ningchun	A famous troupe actress. Huo Tianhong's mistress.
Du Zhiguo	Yu Hangxing	Chairman of the Chamber of commerce. Yu Mengzhu's father.
Zhang Shuangli	Guai Ye	Accountant at the biggest commerce center. He is a man whom Hong Sanyuan respects and relies on, and goes out to help Hong Sanyuan whenever he faces problems.
Wang Deshun	Chu Tianshu	Leader of Beggar Sect. A man of precision.
Yan Jie	Chu Hang	Chu Tianshu's son and heir of the Beggar Sect.
Li Ping	Hong Kuihua	Hong Sanyuan's mother.
Wang Yanhui	Shen Qingshan	Boss of "New World" Dance Hall.
Xie Wenxuan	Meng Louchun	A famous troupe actress. Shen Qingshan's mistress.
Fu Mei	Du Meihui	Daughter of Du Xian. Yu Mengzhu's close friend, but in reality is Japanese. and a spy planted by Japan, and is a skilled martial artist.
Yao Anlian	Du Xian	Vice president of Shanghai's Chamber of Commerce, but is in reality Japanese, and a spy planted by Japan. He is the father of Du Meihui, but it is not clear whether the two are biologically related. It turned out in the final episode that he is also the head ninja.
Dai Mo	Lin Yuanbu	Lin Yiyi's brother. He later becomes a member of the Communist Party.
Tian Xiaojie	Chu Yuxian	A divine physician. Lin Yiyi's subordinate.
Zhang Yu	Ah Xing	Also known as "Cloud Han Tan". Lin Yiyi's subordinate.
Sang Ping	Tie Gu	Lin Yiyi's subordinate.
Zheng Wei	Bo Liu	Also known as "Parrot Yu", a man of glib tongue. Lin Yiyi's subordinate.
Mo Tse	Du Yufang	Also known as "Nan Xiaodu".
Chen Hao	Chen Zheng	A passionate youth.
Xu Seng	Yu Likui	Head of Federation of Rickshaw Pullers Association. Wang Yuqiao's disciple.
Jin Song	Qin Hu	One of the three Qin brothers. A man of exceptional strength.
Xing Yu	Qin Long	One of the three Qin brothers.
Huang Xifei	Qin Pao	One of the three Qin brothers.
Jonathan Kos-Read	Huo Dun/Horton	A Consul from England. Cunning and sly man.
Guo Peng	Cha Liangwei	Number one reporter in Shanghai.
Zhang Guoqing	Housekeeper Zhao	Cao Dun's housekeeper.
Huo Yaming	Hu Kun	Leader of Cao Sect.
Mark Luu	Hei Wuchang	One of the experts of Thirteen Taibao. Shen Qingshan's subordinate.
Charles Luu	Bai Wuchang	One of the experts of Thirteen Taibao. Shen Qingshan's subordinate.
Liu Zhifu	Hui Wuchang	One of the experts of Thirteen Taibao. Shen Qingshan's subordinate.
Wu Di	Nalan Shu	Third young master of the Nalan family.
Yi Junzheng	Wu Shan	Huo family's subordinate.
Wang Yu	Yin Jiuhua	A drunkard.
Zhao Wuyou	Su Chuwu	

=== Special appearance ===
Actor	Character	Introduction
Huang Zhizhong	Huang Fu	
Zhang Li	Little Ahqiao	Shen Da's wife. One of the experts of Thirteen Taibao. She specializes in gathering the latest information about slave trading.
Liu Haoran	Huo Zhenxiao	Young master of the Huo family. He dislikes the rules and regulations of Shanghai.
Chin Shih-chieh	Huang Shang	A man of influence in Shanghai, who currently lives in seclusion.
Lian Yiming	Wang Yuqiao	Also known as "Bei Lao Jiu" (Ninth Master of the South). Leader of Axe Head Sect. Hong Sanyuan's teacher in name.
Cao Bingkun	Jiang Ying	
Guo Jingfei	Prisoner Officer	
Xu Yajun	Xu Shizhao	A member of the Communist Party.
Yin Zhusheng	Li Baozhang	
Liu Huan	Xue'er	
Jiang Feng	Shi Shuangling	Shen Qingshan's housekeeper.
Ren Zhengbin		Chief of police department.
Cao Kefan	Chen Jiuheng	

== Production ==
Filming for the series took place from July to December 2016, taking a total of 155 days.

== Soundtrack ==
Great Expectations - Original Television Soundtrack (远大前程电视剧原声音乐大碟)
No.	Title	Music	Length
1.	"Great Expectations (远大前程)" (Theme song)	NZBZ
2.	"True or False (真假)" (Theme song)	Jason Zhang
3.	"Past Events of Shanghai (上海往事)" (Opening theme song)	Chen Sicheng
4.	"Bustling (熙熙攘攘)"	Jin Zhiwen
5.	"No Reason (无由)"	Yisa Yu
6.	"In this Lifetime, I'll Wait for You to Turn Back (今生等你一次回眸)"	Jin Sha
7.	"The Great Age (大时代)" (Ending theme song)	Sun Bolun

== Spin-off ==
A spin-off titled Great Expectations: Meeting of the Two Dragons (远大前程·双龙会) starts airing on Tencent Video from April 30, 2018. It will focus on the stories of Huo Zhenxiao (portrayed by Liu Haoran), Chen Zheng (portrayed by Chen Hao) and a new character portrayed by Shang Yuxian.

== Awards and nominations ==
Award	Category	Nominated work	Result	Ref.
5th Hengdian Film and TV Festival of China	Best Actor	Chen Sicheng	Won	
25th Shanghai Television Festival	Best Supporting Actor	Liu Yijun	Nominated	
25th Shanghai Television Festival	Best Cinematography		Nominated	
25th Shanghai Television Festival	Best Art Direction		Nominated	
