= Tong Liya =

Chinese actress (born 1984)

- 佟丽娅
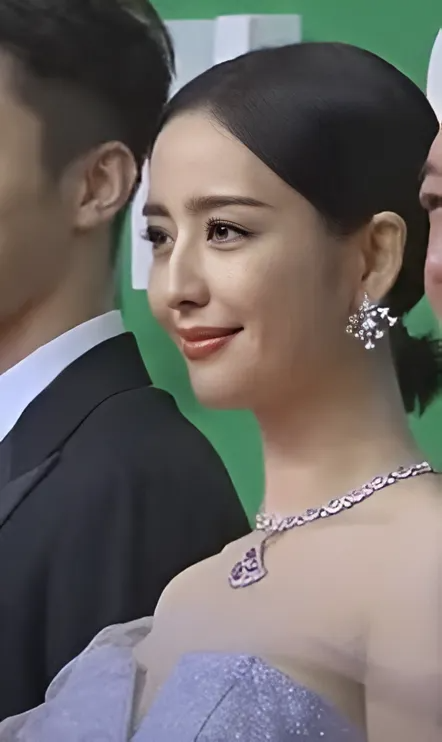
- Tong in 2019
- Born: 8 August 1983 (age 43); Qapqal, Ili, Xinjiang, China
- Other name: Ya Ya (丫丫)
- Education: Central Academy of Drama
- Occupations: Actress, dancer
- Years active: 2008–present
- Agent: Tong Liya Studio
- Spouse: Chen Sicheng (m. 2014; div. 2021)
- Children: 1
- Parent: Tong Jisheng (father)

Chinese name
- Simplified Chinese: 佟丽娅
- Traditional Chinese: 佟麗婭
Transcriptions
Standard Mandarin
- Hanyu Pinyin: Tóng Lìyà

Tong Liya (Chinese: 佟丽娅, born 8 August 1983) is a Chinese actress of Xibe ethnicity. She first gained recognition in The Queens (2008), followed by roles in the television series Palace (2011), Beijing Love Story (2012), Ordinary World (2015), Nirvana in Fire 2 (2017), Great Expectations (2018), as well as the film How Long Will I Love U (2018).

== Background ==
Tong was born in Qapqal Xibe Autonomous County, Ili Kazakh Autonomous Prefecture, Xinjiang province. Her father Tong Jisheng (佟吉生) was of Xibe ethnicity from Xinjiang while her mother Mao Haiying (毛海英) was of Han ethnicity from Gansu.

Tong majored in dance at the Xinjiang Arts Institute, and due to her excellent results, was able to gain a placement at the Xinjiang Singing & Dancing Troupe. She subsequently obtained a qualification to teach dance at Xinjiang Arts Institute in 2000. In 2004, she enrolled in Central Academy of Drama, majoring in performance.

Tong was named ambassador of Xibe in 2011.

== Career ==
Tong made her debut in the Hong Kong television series C'est La Vie, Mon Chéri in 2008, and gained attention for her beautiful looks. Following her role as Zhao Feiyan in the 2009 historical drama The Queens, Tong experienced a rise in popularity.

Tong successfully broke into the mainstream with her subsequent roles in Palace (2011) and Beijing Love Story (2012), which were both major hits. Throughout her career, Tong has portrayed various roles in hit dramas My Economical Man (2012), Weaning (2013), Sword Family Woman (2014) and Obstetrician (2014); and was named the "Ratings Queen" by the Chinese media. She also starred in films, most notably Tsui Hark's wuxia film The Taking of Tiger Mountain (2014) and Chen Sicheng's comedy film Detective Chinatown (2015).

In 2015, Tong starred in the period drama Ordinary World (2015), based on the Mao Dun Literature Prize novel of the same name by Lu Yao. She received acclaim for her performance, and won the Golden Eagle Award for Best Actress.

In 2017, Tong starred in the wuxia drama Nirvana in Fire 2, the sequel to the critically acclaimed drama Nirvana in Fire by Hai Yan.

In 2018, Tong starred in two spy dramas. In Great Expectations, she played the role of a wealthy lady who disguises as a man to infiltrate the underworld to seek revenge for her dead father. In Patriot, she played the role of an underground spy. Tong won the Audience's Loved Character award at the China TV Drama Awards for her portrayal. The same year, Tong won acclaim and numerous accolades for her performance in the romance comedy film How Long Will I Love U.

In January 2020, she starred in the workplace drama Perfect Partner as a public relations officer.

== Personal life ==
Tong and actor Chen Sicheng got married on 16 January 2014. The couple met and fell in love while filming the television series Beijing Love Story, which Chen directed and co-scripted. They announced their relationship on Happy Camp in 2012. The couple got married in 2014 at Tahiti. On 30 January 2016, Tong announced that she had given birth to their first child, a son named Chen Duoduo. On 20 May 2021, Tong and Chen announced their divorce.

== Filmography ==
=== Film ===
| Year | English title | Chinese title | Role | Notes |
|---|---|---|---|---|
| 2009 | Roses' Fragrance | 玫瑰余香 | Guo Jiani | television film |
| 2011 | Endless Love | 花腰女儿红 | Bai Yu | television film |
| 2011 | The Purple House | 紫宅 | Zhou Tong | |
| 2013 | So Young | 致我们终将逝去的青春 | Shi Jie | |
| 2013 | Silent Witness | 全民目击 | Li Xiaoni | |
| 2014 | Beijing Love Story | 北京爱情故事 | Shen Bing | |
| 2014 | The Taking of Tiger Mountain | 智取威虎山 | Little Dove | |
| 2015 | Wild City | 迷城 | Tang Wen | |
| 2015 | Doomed Disaster | 诡劫 | Hu Meirui | |
| 2015 | Surprise | 万万没想到：西游篇 | Scorpion Spirit | Special appearance |
| 2015 | Detective Chinatown | 唐人街·探案 | Ah Xiang | |
| 2016 | Run for Love | 奔爱 | Ye Yiyi | |
| 2016 | Heartfall Arises | 惊天破 | Chen Xiangru | |
| 2018 | How Long Will I Love U | 超时空同居 | Gu Xiaojiao | |
| 2019 | Coward Hero | 鼠胆英雄 | Du Qing | |
| 2019 | My People, My Country | 我和我的祖国 | Yidan | |
| 2020 | My People, My Homeland | 我和我的家乡 | Dong Wenhua | Guest appearance |
| 2021 | Assassin in Red | 刺杀小说家 | | Special appearance |
| 2024 | Black Dog | 狗阵 | Grape | |
| 2024 | Octopus with Broken Arms | 误杀3 | Li Huiping | |
| 2026 | Probation | 我没错！ | Liu Sihan | |

=== Television series ===
| Year | English title | Chinese title | Role | Notes |
|---|---|---|---|---|
| 2008 | Mandarin Duck River | 鸳鸯河 | Wong Manli | |
| 2008 | C'est La Vie, Mon Chéri | 新不了情 | Lee Joi Oi (younger) | |
| 2008 | Empty Lane | 空巷子 | Qi Qiao | |
| 2008 | The Queens | 母仪天下 | Zhao Feiyan | |
| 2009 | I Am a Grass | 我是一棵小草 | Yue Xiaomei | |
| 2009 | Living Pride | 人活一张脸 | Jia Xiaochen | |
| 2009 | Mother and Wife | 娘妻 | Sun Yating | |
| 2010 | Unbeatable | 无懈可击之美女如云 | Sabrina | |
| 2010 | Maid in the Big House | 大屋下的丫鬟 | Su Wenhui | |
| 2010 | Happy Mother-in-Law, Pretty Daughter-in-Law | 欢喜婆婆俏媳妇 | Xilan | Cameo |
| 2010 | The Vigilantes in Masks | 怪侠一枝梅 | Jing Ruyi | |
| 2011 | Palace | 宫 | Nian Suyan (Tong Suyan) | |
| 2011 | Horizon True Heart | 天涯赤子心 | Gao Shuhua | |
| 2011 | Wrong Hate | 错恨 | Dong Zisu | |
| 2011 | Misty Rain in the Setting Sun | 烟雨斜阳 | Gao Wanyi | |
| 2011 | Love Can Come Again | 爱可以重来 | Lu Jialiang | |
| 2011 | Beauty World | 唐宫美人天下 | Wu Qingcheng | |
| 2012 | Beijing Love Story | 北京爱情故事 | Shen Bing | |
| 2012 | My Economical Man | 我的经济适用男 | He Xiaojun | |
| 2012 | Dream Back to Tang Dynasty | 梦回唐朝 | Tao Zhu | |
| 2012 | Beauties of the Emperor | 王的女人 | Wu Meiren | |
| 2013 | After Shock | 唐山大地震 | Wan Xiaodeng | |
| 2013 | Weaning | 断奶 | An Qi | |
| 2013 | Love is Not Blind | 失恋33天 | | Cameo |
| 2013 | Fall in Love | 恋爱的那点事儿 | Yu Huxin | |
| 2014 | Sword Family Women | 刀客家族的女人 | Ge Dani | |
| 2014 | Loving, Never Forgetting | 戀戀不忘 | Wu Tong | |
| 2014 | Obstetrician | 产科医生 | He Jing | |
| 2014 | 80s Engagement | 大都市小爱情 | Su jing | |
| 2015 | Ordinary World | 平凡的世界 | Tian Runye | |
| 2015 | | 酷爸俏妈 | Huang Xiaoying | |
| 2017 | Nirvana in Fire 2 | 琅琊榜之风起长林 | Meng Qianxue | Special appearance |
| 2018 | Great Expectations | 远大前程 | Lin Yiyi | |
| 2018 | Patriot | 爱国者 | Shu Jian | |
| 2019 | Right Here Waiting For You | 我在未来等你 | adult Wei Xiao | Cameo |
| 2020 | Perfect Partner | 完美关系 | Jiang Linda | |
| 2020 | The Fiery Years of Gao Da Xia | 高大霞的火红年代 | Gao Daxia | |
| 2020 | The Centimeter of Love | 爱的厘米 | Guan Yuqing | |
| 2021 | Too Good to be Married | 明天我们好好过 | He Daye | |
| 2021 | Refinement of Faith | 百炼成钢 | Qin Ziyin | Segment "Sing for the Nation" |
| 2022 | The Scale of Desire | 杠杆 | Chen Xin | |
| TBA | The Love Without a Trace | 爱无痕 | Shen Lianxing | |
| TBA | Huan Xi Sha | 浣溪沙 | Xi Shi | |

== Discography ==
=== Singles ===
| Year | English title | Chinese title | Album | Notes |
|---|---|---|---|---|
| 2012 | "Love Has No Reason" | 爱情没什么道理 | My Economical Man OST | |
| 2012 | "Only Sing For You" | 只为你歌唱 | —N/a | |
| 2013 | "Us" | 我们 | —N/a | with her university friends |
| 2018 | "Don't Forget Me" | 不要忘了我 | How Long Will I Love U OST | with Lei Jiayin |
| 2020 | "Firmly Believe Love Will Win" | 坚信爱会赢 | | COVID-19 pandemic support theme song |

== Awards and nominations ==
| Year | Award | Category | Nominated work | Result | Ref. |
|---|---|---|---|---|---|
| 2012 | 26th China TV Golden Eagle Award | Best Actress | Beijing Love Story | Nominated | |
| 2014 | 13th Huading Awards | Best Actress in a Television Series | Aftershock | Won | |
| 2014 | 6th China Image Film Festival | Best Young Actress | Beijing Love Story | Won | |
| 2014 | 6th Macau International Movie Festival | Best Actress | Beijing Love Story | Nominated | |
| 2015 | 21st Shanghai Television Festival | Best Actress | Ordinary World | Nominated | |
| 2016 | 19th Huading Awards | Best Actress (Modern Drama) | Ordinary World | Won | |
| 2016 | 28th China TV Golden Eagle Award | Audience's Choice for Actress | Ordinary World | Won | |
| 2017 | 4th The Actors of China Award Ceremony | Best Actress (Emerald) | —N/a | Won | |
| 2018 | 24th Huading Awards | Best Actress | Patriot | Nominated | |
| 2018 | 8th China Movie Channel Media Awards | Best Actress | How Long Will I Love U | Won | |
| 2018 | 17th Huabiao Awards | Outstanding Actress | How Long Will I Love U | Nominated | |
| 2018 | 18th Chinese Film Media Awards | Most Anticipated Actress | How Long Will I Love U | Won | |
| 2019 | 26th Beijing College Student Film Festival | Favorite Actress | How Long Will I Love U | Won | |
| 2019 | 25th Huading Awards | Best Actress | How Long Will I Love U | Nominated | |
| 2019 | Cosmo Glam Night | Person of the Year (Dream) | —N/a | Won | |
| 2019 | Jinri Toutiao Awards Ceremony | Quality Actress of the Year | —N/a | Won | |
| 2020 | Weibo Awards Ceremony | Weibo Goddess | —N/a | Won | |

=== Forbes China Celebrity 100 ===
| Year | Rank | Ref. |
|---|---|---|
| 2013 | 79th | |
| 2014 | 43rd | |
| 2015 | 66th | |
| 2017 | 38th | |
| 2019 | 79th | |
| 2020 | 55th | |
