= Beijing Love Story (TV series) =

- Poster
- Written by: Chen Sicheng; Li Yaling
- Directed by: Chen Sicheng
- Starring: Chen Sicheng; Li Chen; Zhang Yi; Tong Liya; Yang Mi; Zhang Xinyi; Monica Mok
- Country of origin: China
- Original language: Mandarin
- No. of episodes: 39

Production
- Production companies: New Classics Media; Le TV

Original release
- Network: Zhejiang Television
- Release: 8 January 2012

Beijing Love Story (Chinese: 北京爱情故事; pinyin: Běijīng àiqíng gùshì) is a 2012 Chinese television series co-scripted and directed by Chen Sicheng, starring himself, Li Chen, Zhang Yi, Tong Liya, Yang Mi, Zhang Xinyi and Monica Mok. This is Chen Sicheng's directorial debut. It premiered on Zhejiang TV on 8 January 2012.

The series was one of the most watched during its broadcast. More than 1 billion views were recorded on Chinese video streaming sites by 9 February 2012, just 32 days after the first episode aired. Following the success, Chen later directed a 2014 film of the same name, which was a huge box office success. (Also befitting for a love story, he fell in love with co-star Tong Liya on the set and married her in 2014.)

== Synopsis ==
Cheng Feng (Chen Sicheng), Wu Di (Li Chen) and Shi Xiaomeng (Zhang Yi) were good friends in their university days in Beijing, and formed a small band together. All three guys have different backgrounds and characters, but common aspiration and interest brought them together. The drama tells the story of how the three good friends face problems of love and career together.

== Cast ==
- Chen Sicheng as Cheng Feng

The playboy son of a successful business man, who has a complicated relationship with his father.

- Li Chen as Wu Di

An honest, dependable and hardworking man.

- Zhang Yi as Shi Xiaomeng

A guy who comes from a poor background in countryside Yunan, and his dream is to become successful in Beijing.

- Tong Liya as Shen Bing

The long-time girlfriend of Shi Xiaomeng, who comes from Yunan to Beijing to live with him. Her father died saving her when she was young, and she is left with an old and sickly mother. Cheng Feng sees her and immediately falls in love with her.

- Yang Mi as Yang Zixi

A magazine editor of a publishing house. She is Wu Di's ex-girlfriend, who broke up with him as she felt that he had no future. She falls in love with playboy Andy, but was later dumped by him.

- Zhang Xinyi as Lin Xia

A magazine editor of at a publishing house. She is Cheng Feng's ex-girlfriend. Despite Cheng Feng's playboy tendencies, she feels that he treats her differently. However, she does not know that Cheng Feng only treats her as a normal friend.

- Monica Mok as Wu Mei

A high ranked executive at a finance company. She is Wu Di's boss, and also the ex-girlfriend of Wu Qiu (Wu Di's step brother). She was attracted to Wu Di's honest personality, and ends up together with him.

== Soundtrack ==
Beijing Love Story - Original Television Soundtrack (北京爱情故事电视剧原声音乐大碟)
No.	Title	Music	Length
1.	"Story of Time (光阴的故事)"	Lo Ta-yu
2.	"The Most Romantic Thing (最浪漫的事)"	Cindy Chaw
3.	"The Earth's Core (地心)"	Wang Feng
4.	"Goodbye Youth (再见青春)"	Wang Feng
5.	"Drip Drop (滴答)"	Kan Kan
6.	"Love Love (爱情爱情)"	Yang Mi
7.	"Time (时间)"	Chen Sicheng

== Awards ==
Year	Award	Category	Winner	Ref
2012	26th China TV Golden Eagle Award	Best Actress	Yang Mi	
2012	China TV Drama Awards	Top Ten Television Series	Beijing Love Story	

== International broadcast ==
- China – Zhejiang Television, January 8, 2012
- Hong Kong – TVB, June 24, 2012 (Mandarin), December 15, 2014 (Cantonese dub)
- USA – International Chinese Network, August 1, 2012
- Nigeria – Nigerian Television Authority, September 8, 2013 (dubbed in Hausa, as Soyayyar Matasan Beijing)
- Philippines - PTV, unknown date (dubbed in Filipino)
- Indonesia – Vision 2 Drama, May 12, 2014
- Taiwan – Eye TV, August 16, 2014
- Fiji – Fiji Television, November 20, 2014
- Uganda – NBS Television, February 19, 2015
- Botswana – Botswana TV, April 17, 2015
