= Detective Chinatown =

2015 film by Chen Sicheng

- Theatrical release poster
- Chinese: 唐人街探案
- Literal meaning: Chinatown detective
- Hanyu Pinyin: Tángrénjiē Tàn Àn
- Directed by: Chen Sicheng
- Written by: Cheng Jiake; Liu Kai; Bai He; Chen Sicheng
- Produced by: Rong Ma; Wang Haipeng; Liu Qingqing; Jiang Peng; Kang Li; Chen Zhixi
- Starring: Wang Baoqiang; Liu Haoran; Tong Liya; Chen He
- Cinematography: Du Jie
- Edited by: Cheng Zhiwei
- Music by: Nathan Wang
- Production companies: Heyi Pictures; MM2 Entertainment; Quidam Studios; WanDa Pictures; Wuzhou Film Distribution
- Distributed by: China Lion Film Distribution; Golden Village Pictures; MM2 Entertainment; GEM Entertainment; Wuzhou Film Distribution
- Release date: 31 December 2015 (China)
- Running time: 136 minutes
- Country: China
- Languages: Mandarin; Thai
- Budget: $15 million
- Box office: $120.6 million

Detective Chinatown (Chinese: 唐人街探案) is a 2015 Chinese comedy-mystery buddy film directed by Chen Sicheng and starring Wang Baoqiang and Liu Haoran. It was released in China on 31 December 2015. A sequel, was released in February 2018, and a third film was released in February 2021.

== Plot ==
After being rejected from a police college, Qin Feng goes to Bangkok for a vacation. He plans to spend time with his "uncle" Tang Ren, who is reputed to be the number one detective of Chinatown in Bangkok. Tang Ren turns out to be a sleazy petty swindler who is an underling of incompetent police sergeant Kon Tai. Meanwhile, the main suspect in a gold robbery case, Sompat, is murdered and the gold goes missing. The gold belongs to prominent local gangster Mr. Yan. Kon Tai and his ambitious rival Huang Landeng, are put into competition by the police chief to solve the case and retrieve the gold in order to be appointed the next deputy chief.

After a series of mischievous adventures with Qin in Bangkok, Tang is pursued by police as he is the main suspect in Sompat's murder, being the last person to enter and leave Sompat's workshop where he was murdered. Tang seeks the help of Qin, who turns out to be a prodigy in solving crimes. During their exodus from the pursuit, Qin and Tang are captured by Sompat's cohorts who wish to locate the lost gold. Qin and Tang, now wanted criminals, are able to escape and hide in the home of Xiang, Tang's beautiful landlady. However, they are followed by the gold robbers, who arrive just before Kon and then Huang, leading to an awkward confrontation between all parties.

Qin later finds out why Tang is implicated: on the day of the murder, Tang received a call asking him to deliver a boxed Buddha statue from Sompat's workshop at midnight. The pair, deciding to stay in Thailand rather than flee, goes to the parking lot where Tang delivered the box. Qin finds a trace of fish in the area, after which they go to a nearby seafood market and a junk yard. That night, Qin and Tang search the workshop, narrowly avoiding an encounter with the robbers. Qin deduces that Huang Landeng's assistant, Tony, is part of the scheme.

To solve the murder, Qin and Tang must watch the surveillance footage of the workshop. As it is kept in Huang's computer, Tang lures the police force away while Qin and Kon retrieve the footage and other documents about Sompat. After translating the documents, Qin finds that Sompat's son went missing a year prior and that Sompat frequented a café. Following the trail, Qin and Tang are led to Snow, who was a school classmate of Sompat's son.

Qin and Tang are soon captured and led to Mr. Yan, who gives them 3 days to find the stolen gold. Qin and Tang split up after quarrelling with each other, with Qin finding Snow for a second time and Tang being pursued again by Huang. At Snow's house, Qin saw Snow's stepfather returned from work and suddenly, Qin's photogenetic memory kicked into overdrive and Qin remembered that he had glanced at Snow's stepfather whilst him and Tang's initial visit to the junk yard near the parking lot, making him a suspect. Huang chased Tang to a construction site but after a blunder, Tang fell into a gondola after a tussle and by luck, used it to escape from Huang's pursuit.

Qin and Tang rejoin at the workshop, where after a re-enactment, they hypothesized that the murderer hid in the workshop for one week (As the surveillance footage overrides itself after a week), killed Sompat before Tang's delivery, and escaped the workshop by hiding in the box Tang delivered. They are suddenly ambushed by the masked murderer, who sets the workshop on fire. Qin and Tang narrowly escape.

Returning back to Tang's apartment, they found that Xiang is being held hostage by Tony, Qin and Tang confront and defeat him and Xiang was shot by Tony during the process. The pair delivers Xiang to the hospital and Tang revealed to Qin that his reasoning of staying in Thailand was that during his wedding day, he witnessed his wife having an affair with the groomsman and having lost his dignity with the whole village knowing about the issue, he left China to escape the pain. Whilst still at the hospital, Qin and Tang witness a shootout between the police and the other three robbers and used that chaos to escape the hospital. Qin and Tang return to Snow's home yet again, but find that she has overdosed and is on the verge of death. After delivering Snow to the hospital, Qin finds the story behind the murder in Snow's journal that Snow was raped by Sompat, which her stepfather found out, leading him to kill Sompat and the gold robbery and the murder are unrelated.

After a car chase around Bangkok, Qin and Tang lead the police back to the workshop and finally revealed to the police that the lost gold was hidden in a statue at the workshop. At the hospital where Snow resides, Qin and Tang convey their findings to the police in the presence of Snow and her stepfather. After being exposed, the stepfather is killed by Kon's car when he jumps out of the hospital window. Kon is subsequently promoted to deputy chief due to his prevention of the murderer's escape, to the annoyance of a severely injured Huang.

However, Qin soon realizes that Sompat was homosexual, meaning he did not rape Snow. He realizes that Snow was stalked by Sompat because he suspected her of killing his missing son. Thus, Snow planned Sompat's murder, framed him for rape in her journal, and fabricated the evidence to get rid of both Sompat and her pervert stepfather, whom she loathed. Qin confronts Snow, but decides to leave her.

In the credits, Qin and Tang are invited to an Intel centre where they are called to solve a new case in New York.

== Cast ==
- Wang Baoqiang as Tang Ren (Chinese: 唐仁)

Qin Feng's uncle, a swindler who lives in Bangkok and claims to be the best detective of Chinatown. Tang Ren accepted an anonymous delivery job before Qin arrived and became the last person entered Sompat's murder scene. Therefore, both the police and the robbers consider him as the one who murdered Sompat and left with the gold.

- Liu Haoran as Qin Feng (Chinese: 秦风)

Tang Ren's nephew, a talented teenager who has astonishing perception and memory yet was rejected from the police college presumably because he said he wanted to "commit the perfect crime" during the entry test. He went to Bangkok for a vacation, then gets involved in Sompat's case by accident.

- Tong Liya as Xiang (Chinese: 阿香)

Tang Ren's love interest and landlady.

- Chen He as Huang Landeng (Chinese: 黄兰登)

Kon Tai's rival in the police department. He is ambitious and eager to solve Sompat's murder case.

- Xiao Yang as Kon Tai (Chinese: 坤泰)

A police sergeant of Chinatown police department. He is Tang Red's close friend and rival to sergeant Huang.

- Xiaoshenyang as Bei Ge (Chinese: 北哥)
- Pan Yueming as Lee (Chinese: 李)
- Marc Ma as Tony (Chinese: 托尼)

Huang's deputy.

- Zhang Zifeng as Snow (Chinese: 斯诺)
- Zhao Yingjun as Vietnamese (Chinese: 越南仔)

One of the gold robbers.

- Ekapan Bunluerit as Rames SaengTham (Uncredits Cast)
- Chalee Immak as Chalee Immak

== Reception ==
The film grossed US$4.43 million in previews at the Chinese box office.

It was the ninth highest grossing film in China in 2015, grossing $126 million.

== Sequels ==
A sequel, Detective Chinatown 2, also written and directed by Chen Sicheng and set in New York City's Chinatown, was released on 16 February 2018 during the Chinese New Year holiday season. In addition to the two leads Wang Baoqiang and Liu Haoran reprising their roles, new supporting cast members in Detective Chinatown 2 include Xiao Yang, Michael Pitt, Natasha Liu Bordizzo, Yuen Wah, and Satoshi Tsumabuki.

Another sequel, Detective Chinatown 3, was released on 12 February 2021.

=== Web Series ===
Premiering in January 2020, a web series starring Lin Mo (Roy Chiu) and Sa Sha (Zhang Yishang) expanded the Detective Chinatown universe. Following the events of the first Detective Chinatown film, this series introduces new detectives and delves deeper into the intricate mysteries and cases that run concurrently with the events of the Detective Chinatown films.

In February 2024, a second season was also produced, featuring the return of Kiko (Yuxian Shang) from Detective Chinatown 2, who reprises her role as one of the main protagonists of the show.

Both seasons were made available exclusively on the subscription video on-demand over-the-top streaming service iQIYI.

== Nomination ==
Year	Session	Award	Category	Winner	result
2016	23rd	Beijing University Film Festival	Best Screenplay Award	Chen Sicheng	Won
2016	24th	Shanghai Film Critics Awards	Newcomer Director of the Year	Chen Sicheng	Nominated
2016	24th	Shanghai Film Critics Awards	Best Newcomer Actor Award	Liu Haoran	Nominated
2016	24th	Shanghai Film Critics Awards	Newcomer of the year (Best Film)	Detective in Chinatown	Nominated
2016	19th	Shanghai International Film Festival	Asian Newcomer Award-Best Film	Detective in Chinatown	Nominated
2016	19th	Shanghai International Film Festival	Asian Newcomer Award-Best Actor	Liu Haoran	Nominated
2016	19th	Shanghai International Film Festival	Asian Newcomer Award-Best Screenwriter	Chen Sicheng	Nominated
2016	7th	China Film Index Festival	Best Screen New Actor	Liu Haoran	Won
2016	7th	China Film Index Festival	Best Emerging Director	Chen Sicheng	Won
2016	20th	Huading Awards	China Film Satisfaction Survey Releases Ceremony ""Best Film Production Agency"	Detective in Chinatown	Nominated
2016	20th	Huading Awards	Chinese Film Satisfaction Survey Releases Ceremony "Best Newcomer in China"	Liu Haoran	Won
2016	20th	Huading Awards	Chinese Film Satisfaction Survey Releases Ceremony "Best Actor in China"	Wang Baoqiang	Nominated
2016	20th	Huading Awards	7th place in the Top 50 movies	Detective in Chinatown	Won
2016	73rd	Venice International Film Festival	Special recommendation and exhibition unit of "Venice Day"	Detective in Chinatown	Won
2016	53rd	Golden Horse Film Festival and Awards	Best Photography	Du Jie	Nominated
2016	53rd	Golden Horse Film Festival and Awards	Golden Horse Award for Best Action Design	Wu Gang	Won
2016	53rd	Golden Horse Film Festival and Awards	Golden Horse Award for Best Art Design	Li Miao	Nominated
2016	53rd	Golden Horse Film Festival and Awards	Golden Horse Award Best Design	Zhang Shijie	Won
2016	53rd	Golden Horse Film Festival and Awards	Golden Horse Award for Best Original Film Song	"Savadica"	Nominated
2016	16th	Chinese Film Media Awards	Most watched Movie	Detective in Chinatown	Won
2016	16th	Chinese Film Media Awards	Most watched Actor	Liu Haoran	Nominated
2016	16th	Chinese Film Media Awards	Most watched Performance	Liu Haoran	Nominated
