= Wanda Media =

Chinese film production and distribution company

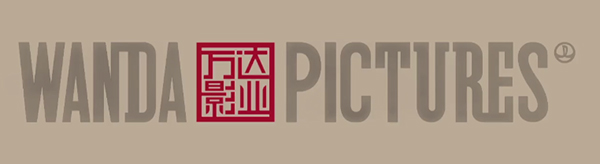
- Native name: 万达影视传媒有限公司
- Type: Subsidiary
- Industry: Film
- Founded: 2011; 15 years ago
- Headquarters: Beijing, China
- Parent: Wanda Group
- Website: Official website

Wanda Media
- Traditional Chinese: 萬達影視傳媒有限公司
- Simplified Chinese: 万达影视传媒有限公司
Transcriptions
Standard Mandarin
- Hanyu Pinyin: Wàndá Yǐngshì Chuánméi Yǒuxiàn Gōngsī

Wanda Media (Chinese: 万达影视传媒有限公司), also known as Wanda Pictures, is a Chinese film production company and distributor. Wanda Media is a subsidiary of Wanda Group which is responsible for the development, investment, production, publicity, marketing, copyright operations, and other film and television related business. In 2014, the company was the largest Chinese private film production company and second-largest overall Chinese production company in China by market share, with 3.17%, and the fifth-largest film distributor, with 5.2% of the market.

== Filmography ==
The following is a list of films produced and/or distributed by Wanda Media (also known as Wanda Pictures).

Release date	Title	Gross	Ref.
July 5, 2013	Man of Tai Chi	CNY 5,421,632	
April 29, 2014	The Great Hypnotist	CNY 273.765 million	
January 30, 2015	Running Man	CNY 434.075 million	
February 6, 2015	Crazy New Year's Eve	CNY 69.702 million	
September 30, 2015	Goodbye Mr. Loser	CNY 228.5 million	
December 31, 2015	Detective Chinatown	USD 120.6 million	
March 18, 2016	The Rise of a Tomboy	CNY 63.382 million	
December 30, 2016	Some Like It Hot	CNY 9.8 million	
April 7, 2017	Smurfs: The Lost Village	USD 197.6 million	
May 30, 2017	Wonder Woman	USD 822.8 million	
February 16, 2018	Detective Chinatown 2	CNY 3.397 billion	
February 12, 2021	Detective Chinatown 3	CNY 4.523 billion	
January 29, 2025	Detective Chinatown 1900	USD 455 million	
April 17, 2026	The Legend Hunters	N/A	
