= Wang Baoqiang =

Chinese actor (born 1984)

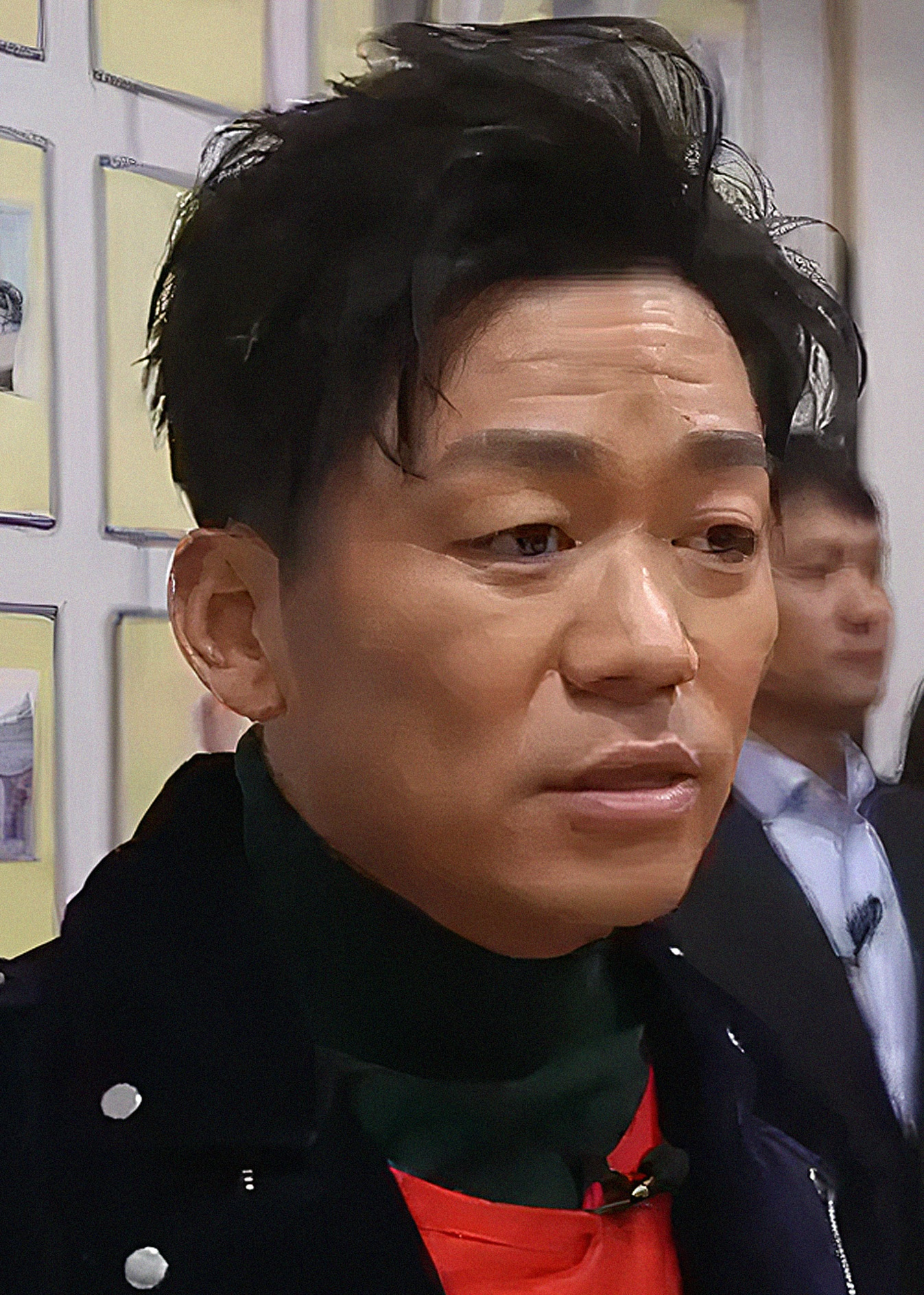
- Wang in 2019
- Born: Wang Yongqiang (王永强); 29 May 1984 (age 42); Nanhe County, Xingtai, Hebei, China
- Occupations: Actor; director
- Years active: 2000–present
- Spouse: Ma Rong (m. 2009; div. 2016)
- Children: 2
- Parent(s): Wang Yinsheng (father); Liu Huan (mother)
- Awards: Full list

Chinese name
- Simplified Chinese: 王宝强
- Traditional Chinese: 王寶強
Transcriptions
Standard Mandarin
- Hanyu Pinyin: Wáng Bǎoqiáng

Wang Baoqiang (simplified Chinese: 王宝强; traditional Chinese: 王寶強; pinyin: Wáng Bǎoqiáng; born 29 May 1984) is a Chinese martial artist, actor and director. Wang first received recognition in the film Blind Shaft (2003), for which he shared the Best New Performer prize at the Golden Horse Awards. He went on to star in the television series Soldiers Sortie (2006) and My Brother's Name is Shun Liu (2009), garnering further attention. His notable film credits include Lost on Journey (2010), Lost in Thailand (2012), Monk Comes Down the Mountain (2015), the Detective Chinatown film series (2015–2021), and Never Say Never (2023). In 2017, Wang made his directorial debut with the action-adventure film Buddies in India.

== Early life ==
Wang Baoqiang was born in Nanhe County, Xingtai, Hebei, on May 29, 1984, to Wang Yinsheng (王银生) and Liu Huan (刘焕), both of whom were farmers. When Wang Baoqiang was 8 years old, his village showed the movie Shaolin Temple starring Jet Li, which inspired him to become a martial arts star in movies like Jet Li and Jackie Chan. Wang insisted on going to a Shaolin Temple though his family opposed it, in the same year. He trained in Shaolin martial arts.

== Career ==
Prior to entering the film industry, Wang was an unskilled labourer who was paid 25 yuan a day; he had not been home for over two years as he was unable to afford the railway ticket. Wang was initially rejected from acting due to his height, but got his start working as an extra in Beijing.

In 2002, Wang Baoqiang came across the casting team for Blind Shaft, and was eventually chosen by director Li Yang to play the lead role due to his disheartened appearance.

In 2003, he was cast in the independent film Blind Shaft as a "down-to-earth" guy. For his role in Blind Shaft, Wang received the Best Newcomer award at the Golden Horse Film Festival.

Wang then starred in Feng Xiaogang's 2004 film A World Without Thieves as a naïve village boy, a performance which received critical acclaim.

In 2006, Wang starred in the military drama Soldiers Sortie, playing a soldier who is physically slow but who wins respect because of his strong faith and untiring efforts. The drama was a huge hit, and gained Wang wide critical acclaim and huge popularity.

In 2009, Wang starred in another military drama, My Brother is Shun Liu as the title character. The drama was another huge success for Wang.

For his performance in the 2011 comedy film Hello, Mr. Tree, Wang won multiple awards. He won the for Best Actor at the 9th Vladivostok International Film Festival in Russia, the award for Best Actor at the 5th Asia Pacific Screen Awards, the award for Best Actor at the New York Chinese Film Festival, the award for Best Actor of the 2011–2012 Chinese Youth Film Handbook, and the award for Best Actor at the Italy Asian Film Festival.

Wang's 2012 comedy film Lost in Thailand was a smash hit at the box-office. Wang is also noted for his role in the comedy film series Detective Chinatown and its sequel, Detective Chinatown 2.

In May 2013, Wang Baoqiang, along with the cast and crew of the film A Touch of Sin, attended the 66th Cannes Film Festival.

In 2014, he starred in the fantasy adventure drama film Monk Comes Down the Mountain, directed by Chen Kaige. On October 31, the action film Kung Fu Jungle, in which he starred, was released in theaters.

In February 2015, he was nominated for Best Supporting Actor at the 34th Hong Kong Film Awards for his performance in the film Kung Fu Jungle. In September, Wang Baoqiang starred in Impossible, China's first sci-fi comedy film, which was set to compete in the New Year holiday film season. On September 17, I Am Robot, starring Wang Baoqiang, premiered on Jiangsu TV. On December 31, the comedy film Detective Chinatown, in which he starred, was released nationwide as a New Year's Eve premiere.

In 2017, Wang made his directorial debut with the fantasy comedy film Buddies in India.

In 2018, the film The Island, starring Wang Baoqiang, was released. The film's box office surpassed 1 billion yuan.

In 2019, Wang starred in Stephen Chow's comedy film The New King of Comedy.

In 2020, Wang starred in Chen Sicheng's movie Detective Chinatown 3.

== Personal life ==
Wang Baoqiang married Ma Rong (马蓉) on 10 February 2010. They have two children. On 14 August 2016, Wang made a post to Sina Weibo announcing he would divorce Ma. He accused her of entering an extramarital affair with his agent, Song Zhe (宋喆), and transferring/concealing some of the couple's assets. In a later Sina Weibo post, Ma said Wang had abandoned their family, and threatened to sue him for defamation; she filed a case against Wang on August 16. The divorce became a trending topic on Sina Weibo, where posts with the hashtag #WangBaoQiangDivorce were viewed over five billion times. Wang filed for divorce that was accepted by a Beijing Court, and the trial was held in October 2016. Song's wife also filed for divorce. On October 18, 2018, the Beijing Chaoyang Court sentenced the first instance of Wang Baoqiang's former agent Song Zhe for the crime of embezzlement and was sentenced to 6 years in prison.

== Social activities ==
In 2009, Wang Baoqiang served as the ambassador for the Zhejiang Low-Income Rural Youth Care Campaign.

In August 2019, Forbes released the list of China's Top 100 Celebrities, with Wang Baoqiang ranking 91st.

== Filmography ==
=== Film ===
Year	English title	Chinese title	Role	Notes/Ref.
2001	Big Shot's Funeral	大腕		Uncredited
2003	Blind Shaft	盲井	Yuan Fengming	
2004	A World Without Thieves	天下无贼	Sha Gen	
2007	Born To Run	烈火男儿	Long Dachuan	
2007	Assembly	集结号	Jiang Maocai	
2007	Two Stupid Eggs	大电影2.0之两个傻瓜的荒唐事		
2008	A Mediator in Green Mountains	绿满山乡	Wang Xiaoqiang	
2008	The Equation of Love and Death	李米的猜想	Qiu Shuitian	
2009	The Founding of a Republic	建国大业	A soldier	
2009	Eaters	大胃王	Xiao Shuai	
2009	Da You Cun Bright Future	大有前途	A Kun	
2010	Little Big Soldier	大兵小将	A spy	Cameo
2010	Fire of Conscience	火龙对决	Huang Yong	
2010	East Wind Rain	东风雨	Xiao Kai	
2010	Lost on Journey	人在囧途	Niu Geng	
2011	Love for Life	最爱	Dazui	
2011	Choy Lee Fut Kung Fu	蔡李佛拳2010	Chen Cheng	
2011	Mr. Tree	HELLO!树先生	Mr. Tree	
2012	Romancing in Thin Air	高海拔之恋II	Zhang Xing	
2012	Jack of All Trades	神通乡巴佬	Chu Zhongtian	
2012	Fairy Tale Killer	追凶	Wu Zaijun	
2012	Lost in Thailand	人再囧途之泰囧	Wang Bao	
2013	Better and Better	越来越好之村晚	Yang Guoshu	
2013	Unbeatable	激战	Boss Chan	Cameo
2014	A Touch of Sin	天注定	San'er	
2014	Iceman	冰封：重生之门	Sa Ao	
2014	Kung Fu Jungle	一个人的武林	Feng Yuxiu	
2015	Running Man	奔跑吧！兄弟	Himself	
2015	Monk Comes Down the Mountain	道士下山	He An	
2015	Impossible	不可思异	Tang Liguo	
2015	Detective Chinatown	唐人街·探案	Tang Ren	
2015	PK	我的个神啊	PK (dub voice)	
2017	Buddies in India	大闹天竺	Wu Tian	
2017	Wished	反转人生	Megaton (voice)	Cameo
2018	Detective Chinatown 2	唐人街·探案2	Tang Ren	
2018	The Faces of My Gene	祖宗十九代	Erdangjia	
2018	The Island	一出好戏	Xiao Wang	
2018	Iceman 2	冰封：永恒之门	Sa Ao	
2019	The New King of Comedy	新喜剧之王	Ma Ke	
2020	My People, My Homeland	我和我的家乡	Old Tang	
2021	Detective Chinatown 3	唐人街·探案3	Tang Ren	
2021	Rising Shaolin: The Protector	少林寺之得宝传奇	Ximendebao	
2021	Thaiflavor	泰味儿		
2023	Never Say Never	八角笼中	Xiang Tengjun	

=== Television series ===
Year	English title	Chinese title	Role	Notes/Ref.
2002	Seventh Imperial Envoy Liu Luoguo	七品钦差刘罗锅	A waiter	
2005	Secret Plot	暗算	A Bing	
2006	Legend of Shang Dynasty	传奇·幻想殷商	Nezha	
2006	Soldiers Sortie	士兵突击	Xu Sanduo	
2006	Red Flag Children	红旗渠的儿女们	Bao Xiang	
2009	My Brother's Name is Shun Liu	我的兄弟叫顺溜	Shun Liu	
2010	For New China to Go Forward	为了新中国前进	Dong Cunrui	
2011	My Father Is Ban Deng	我的父亲是板凳	Bandeng	
2013	Heroes in Sui and Tang Dynasties	隋唐演义	Li Yuanba	
2015	Rise to Fame Overnight	我是机器人	Yuan Bao	
2020	Detective Chinatown	唐人街探案	Tang Ren (Cameo – Season 1 & 2)	

=== Variety show ===
Year	English title	Chinese title	Role	Notes/Ref.
2014–2015	Keep Running	奔跑吧兄弟	Cast member	
2018	Space Challenge	挑战吧 ! 太空	Cast member	

== Accolades ==
=== Awards and nominations ===
Year	Nominated work	Award	Category	Result	Ref.
2003	Blind Shaft	40th Golden Horse Awards	Best New Performer	Won	
2004	Blind Shaft	5th Deauville Asian Film Festival	Best Actor	Won	
2004	Blind Shaft	2nd Bangkok International Film Festival	Best Actor	Won	
2005	A World Without Thieves	5th Chinese Film Media Awards	Best New Performer	Nominated	
2006	A World Without Thieves	28th Hundred Flowers Awards	Best New Performer	Nominated	
2008	Soldiers Sortie	24th China TV Golden Eagle Award	Best Actor	Won	
2008	Soldiers Sortie	24th China TV Golden Eagle Award	Most Popular Actor	Won	
2009	Soldiers Sortie	27th Flying Apsaras Awards	Outstanding Actor	Nominated	
2010	My Brother's Name is Shun Liu	16th Shanghai Television Festival	Best Actor	Nominated	
2011	Mr. Tree	9th Pacific Meridian	Best Actor	Won	
2011	Mr. Tree	5th Asia Pacific Screen Awards	Best Actor	Won	
2011	Mr. Tree	2nd New York Chinese Film Festival	Best Actor	Won	
2011	Mr. Tree	12th Chinese Film Media Awards	Best Actor	Nominated	
2012	Mr. Tree	10th Italy Asian Film Festival	Best Actor	Won	
2013	Lost in Thailand	20th Beijing College Student Film Festival	Most Popular Actor	Won	
2014	Kung Fu Jungle	6th Macau International Movie Festival	Best Supporting Actor	Nominated	
2015	Kung Fu Jungle	34th Hong Kong Film Awards	Best Supporting Actor	Nominated	
2015	Kung Fu Jungle	1st Jackie Chan Action Movie Awards	Best New Action Actor	Won	

=== Forbes China Celebrity 100 ===
Year	Rank	Ref.
2013	98th	
2014	64th	
2015	71st	
2019	91st	
2020	96th	
