= Chen Sicheng =

Chinese actor and filmmaker

- Born: February 22, 1978 (age 48); Shenyang, Liaoning, China
- Education: Central Academy of Drama
- Occupations: Actor; filmmaker
- Years active: 2001–present
- Spouse: Tong Liya (m. 2014–2021)
- Children: 1

Chinese name
- Traditional Chinese: 陳思誠
- Simplified Chinese: 陈思诚
Transcriptions
Standard Mandarin
- Hanyu Pinyin: Chén Sīchéng
- Musical career

Chen Sicheng (simplified Chinese: 陈思诚; traditional Chinese: 陳思誠; pinyin: Chén Sīchéng; born February 22, 1978) is a Chinese actor and filmmaker. He graduated from the Central Academy of Drama, and is known for his leading roles in the films A Young Prisoner's Revenge and Spring Fever; as well as the television series Soldiers Sortie. As a director, Chen is known for the hit television series Beijing Love Story and its film sequel; as well as the blockbuster comedy film series Detective Chinatown.

== Personal life ==
Chen married actress Tong Liya on January 16, 2014. On January 30, 2016, Tong announced that she had given birth to their first child, a son named Chen Duoduo. On May 20, 2021, Tong and Chen announced their divorce.

== Filmography ==
=== Film ===
Year	English title	Chinese title	Role	Notes
2001	A Young Prisoner's Revenge	法官妈妈	Zhang Shuai	
2004		花山情	Li Yue	
2005	Peach Blossoming	桃花灿烂	Yi Wen	
2008	The New Guard Under Neon Lights	霓虹灯下新哨兵	Lin Mengmeng	
2009	Spring Fever	春风沉醉的夜晚	Luo Haitao	
2010	Seven Arhat	七小罗汉	Jiu Wenlong	
2011	The Man Behind the Courtyard House	守望者:罪恶迷途	Zhou Dong	
2012	Tai Chi 0	太极1从零开始	Chen Gengyun	
2012	Tai Chi Hero	太极2英雄崛起	Chen Gengyun	
2013	Silent Witness	全民目击		Cameo
2013	Bump In The Road	一路顺疯	Zhang Kai	
2013	Out of Inferno	逃出生天	Li Jian	
2013	A Chilling Cosplay	制服	Chen Ansheng	
2014	Beijing Love Story	北京爱情故事	Chen Feng	also director and screenwriter
2015	Jian Bing Man	煎饼侠		Cameo
2015	Detective Chinatown	唐人街探案		Director and screenwriter
2018	Detective Chinatown 2	唐人街探案2		Director and screenwriter
2018	Dating Master	约会大师之爱在响螺湾	Lei Ren	
2019	Sheep Without a Shepherd	误杀		Producer
2020	My People, My Homeland	我和我的家乡		Director
2021	Detective Chinatown 3	唐人街探案3		Director and screenwriter
2021	Fireflies in the Sun	误杀 2		Producer
2022	Mozart from Space	外太空的莫扎特		Director and screenwriter
2023	Lost in the Stars	消失的他		Producer and screenwriter
2023	The Third Squad			Producer
2024	Decoded	解密		Director, producer and screenwriter
2025	Detective Chinatown 1900	唐人街探案1900		Director and screenwriter
2026	Being Towards Death	10间敢死队		Director and screenwriter
2026	Traces of Justice	神探之痕迹		Director and screenwriter

=== Television series ===
Year	English title	Chinese title	Role	Notes
2001		红与黑2000	Yu Jie	
2002		武圣关羽出解梁	Guan Yu	
2003	Beach	海滩	Xiao Wei	
2003		热血忠魂之独行侍卫	Wanli Emperor	
2004	Running Out of Time	暗战	Lu Xiaohu	
2005		民工	Ju Shuangyuan	
2006		石破天惊	Qi Dongping	
2006	Soldiers Sortie	士兵突击	Cheng Cai	
2007	Eat Drink Man Woman	饮食男女	Xiao Zhou	
2007		红旗渠的儿女们	Jin Jiasheng	
2007	Wang Zhaojun	王昭君	Wang Dun	
2008		牵动我心	Su Zhao	
2008		狭路相逢	Huang Tao	
2008	Love is a Blessed Bullet	爱是一颗幸福的子弹	Lei Zhiming	
2009	My Chief and My Regiment	我的团长我的团	Mi Qi	Cameo
2009	Roses of 50	五十玫瑰	Cao Xiaoning	
2010	Pretty Maid	大丫鬟	Xiao Qingyu	
2010	One Plum Blossom	新一剪梅	Liang Yongjing	
2010	Destiny	命运	Feng Ning	
2011	Olive Tree	橄榄树	Feng Guodong	
2012	Beijing Love Story	北京爱情故事	Cheng Feng	also director and screenwriter
2013		宝贝计划	Lin Xiaodong	
2013	The Sweet Burden	小儿难养	Jiang Xin	
2013	Mu Lan	巾帼大将军	Yang Jun	
2014	God of War	战神	Long Dagu	
2015	Running After the Love	大猫儿追爱记	Lin Mangmang	
2017	Blue Sea Ambition	碧海雄心	Chen Yinuo	
2018	Great Expectations	远大前程	Hong Sanyuan	also screenwriter and producer
2020-2024	Detective Chinatown	唐人街探案	—N/a	Producer and Screenwriter

== Awards and nominations ==
Year	Award	Category	Nominated work	Result	Ref.
2002	9th Beijing College Student Film Festival	Best Newcomer	A Young Prisoner's Revenge	Nominated	
2002	8th Huabiao Awards	Outstanding New Actor	A Young Prisoner's Revenge	Nominated	
2002	25th Hundred Flowers Awards	Best Actor	A Young Prisoner's Revenge	Nominated	
2014	21st Beijing College Student Film Festival	Best Directorial Debut	Beijing Love Story	Won	
2014	12th Changchun Film Festival	Best New Director	Beijing Love Story	Won	
2016	23rd Beijing College Student Film Festival	Best Director	Detective Chinatown	Nominated	
2016	23rd Beijing College Student Film Festival	Best Screenwriter	Detective Chinatown	Won	
2016	19th Shanghai International Film Festival	Best Screenwriter	Detective Chinatown	Nominated	
2016	24th Shanghai Film Critics Awards	Best New Director	Detective Chinatown	Nominated	
2016	7th China Film Director's Guild Awards	Best Young Director	Detective Chinatown	Nominated	
2018	5th Hengdian Film and TV Festival of China	Best Actor	Great Expectations	Won	
