= Rebecca Suter =

Japanologist

Rebecca Marcella Suter is professor of Japanese studies at the University of Oslo, and a member of the European Association for Japanese Studies council.

== Career ==
Suter took an M.A. in comparative studies and a Ph.D. in comparative literature in 1999 and 2004 respectively, both from the University of Naples "L'Orientale". While researching for her Ph.D., and for a short period after, she was a lecturer in Japanese studies at the Italian Institute for Africa and the Orient. From 2005 to 2007 she was at Harvard University, first as a postdoc and then as a lecturer in Japanese literature. After a spell as a visiting assistant professor at Brown University in 2007, she moved to the University of Sydney in 2008, and stayed there for some 15 years, becoming a full professor of Japanese studies and comparative literature in 2022.

After Sydney, she moved back to Europe and took up a position as professor of Japanese studies at the University of Oslo. She was elected to the European Association for Japanese Studies council for the period 2023-2026.

== Research interests ==
Suter's principal research interests lie in the field of comparative studies between Japan and the West and how Japanese literature, both historical and contemporary, adopts and draws on Western culture. Her monographs, detailed below, cover topics such as how Murakami Haruki acts as a "mediator between Japanese and American literature and culture"; the depiction of Kirishitan (that is, Catholics in Japan in the 16th and 17th centuries) in contemporary Japanese literary and genre fiction such as manga and anime; and the dual perspective, the "multifaceted lens of reference", of Kazuo Ishiguro as a Japanese growing up and living in the UK.

== Selected works ==
=== Books ===
- The Japanization of modernity : Murakami Haruki between Japan and the United States. Cambridge, Mass.: Harvard University Press. 2008. ISBN 978-0-674-02833-3.
- Katayama, Kyôichi; Kazumi, Kazui (2011). Gridare amore dal centro del mondo (in Italian). Kappa Edizioni. ISBN 978-88-7471-354-7. Suter's translation of Socrates in Love.
- Holy Ghosts: The Christian Century in Modern Japanese Fiction. University of Hawaii Press. 2015. ISBN 978-0-8248-5500-0.
- Two-World Literature: Kazuo Ishiguro's Early Novels (2020)

=== Articles ===
- "Grand Demons and Little Devils: Akutagawa's "Kirishitan mono" as a Mirror of Modernity". The Journal of Japanese Studies. 39 (1): 39–66. 2013. doi:10.1353/jjs.2013.0028. ISSN 0095-6848. JSTOR 24242585. For which Suter won the University of Sydney's Inoue Yasushi Award for Outstanding Research in Japanese Literature, Culture and Art in 2014.
