= 1921 (2021 film) =

- Film poster
- Directed by: Huang Jianxin; Zheng Dasheng
- Written by: Yu Xi; Zhao Ningyu; Huang Xin
- Produced by: Ren Ning
- Starring: Huang Xuan; Ni Ni; Wang Renjun
- Cinematography: Cao Yu
- Edited by: Yu Boyang
- Music by: Liu Ye; Huang Yixin
- Production companies: Shanghai Film Group; Tencent Pictures; China Film Co., Ltd.; Huaxia Film Distribution
- Distributed by: China Film Co., Ltd.; Huaxia Film Distribution; Maoyan Entertainment; Media Asia Film
- Release date: 1 July 2021 (China)
- Running time: 137 minutes
- Country: China
- Language: Mandarin
- Box office: $76.4 million

1921 is a 2021 Chinese historical film directed by Huang Jianxin and Zheng Dasheng and starring Huang Xuan, Ni Ni, Wang Renjun and Liu Haoran. The film premiered in China on 1 July 2021, to commemorate the centennial year anniversary of the Chinese Communist Party.

== Plot elements ==
The film tells the story of the founding of the Chinese Communist Party at the 1st National Congress of the Chinese Communist Party held in Shanghai.

Among the events highlighted in the film are Mao Zedong's role in founding the Xiangjiang Review, one of the Party's first publications.

== Cast ==
- Huang Xuan as Li Da
- Ni Ni as Wang Huiwu, wife of Li Da.
- Wang Renjun as Mao Zedong
- Yuan Wenkang as Li Hanjun
- Elvis Han as Zhang Guotao
- Liu Haoran as Liu Renjing
- Zhang Songwen as He Shuheng
- Zu Feng as Dong Biwu
- Shawn Dou as Chen Tanqiu
- Wang Junkai as Deng Enming
- Liu Jiayi as Wang Jinmei
- Zhang Chao as Chen Gongbo
- Zhang Yunlong as Zhou Fohai
- Hu Xianxu as Bao Huiseng
- Eric Dane as Marin
- Josh Whitehouse as Nikolski
- Chen Kun as Chen Duxiu
- Li Chen as Li Dazhao
- Ni Dahong as Huang Jinrong
- Tian Yu as Cheng Ziqing
- Song Jia as Gao Junman
- Oho Ou as Li Qihan
- Zhu Yilong as Zhou Enlai
- Roy Wang as Deng Xiaoping
- Sosuke Ikematsu as Okawa
- Shunya Shiraishi as Eizo Kondo
- Bai Yu as Cai Hesen
- Feng Shaofeng as Sun Yat-sen
- Lei Jiayin as Hu Ankang
- Ma Tianyu as Li Xiangen
- Liu Peiqi as Ke Shaomin
- Zhang Ruoyun as Liu Shaoqi
- Liu Shishi as Song Qingling
- Wei Daxun as Chiang Kai-shek
- Zhang Zhehan as Xiao Zisheng
- Gu Jiacheng as Luo Zhanglong
- Yuan Quan as Huang Shaolan
- Yin Tao as Wen Suqin, Mao Zedong's mother.
- Zhong Chuxi as Li Lizhuang
- Song Yi as Yang Shuhui
- Zhou Ye as Yang Kaihui
- Guo Zifan as Xu Deheng
- Ouyang Weijia as Deng Zhongxia
- Hui Yu as Tao Yilan
- Mengwei Xie as Bao Zi
- Wang Sen as Li Zhong
- Ye Zuxin as Gu Zhuxian
- Hongrui Zhang as Wang Qiao
- Wang Tianchen as Xu Ahmei
- Xu Kai as Shen Yanbing
- Han Haolin as Chen Henian
- Pengyuan Shi as Shen Zemin
- Thomas Fiquet as E. Flori
- Jonny Chen as Cao Jiasheng
- Liu Dongqin as Shi Cuntong
- Zhang Youhao as Ren Bishi
- Zhao Yiqin as Xiao Jinguang
- Zhang Xiaochen as Yang Dixian
- Xuan Xuan as Yun Duo
- Ruixin Tong as Guo Nianbiao
- Michelle Ye as Wang Xuanjia
- Lu Qi as Yi Lirong
- Fuzhen Kang as Peng Huang
- Geng Le as Chen Jiongming
- Fan Shiqi as Zhang Shenfu
- Sheng Gangshuai as Zhao Shiyan
- Zhang Xueying as Miao Boying
- Chen Yusi as Shen Siqian
- Kudousi Jiang Ainiwaer as Tan Zhitang
- Boxiao Liu as Tan Pingshan
- Na-Na OuYang as Tao Xuan
- Chen Meiyi as Lu Yin
- Xia Meng as Chen Dingxiu
- Chen Qianyu as Wang Shiying
- Peng Chuyue as Fang Hao
- Caesar Wu as Yang Hui
- Haiyu Zhang as Chen Guofu
- An Zehao as Mao Yichang, Mao Zedong's father.
- Yu Haoming as Lu Zhengzhang
- Liu Chang as Li Jie
- He Ye as Young Soldier
- Eiji Okuda
- Bao Bei'er as Zhao Xigui
- Bai Yufan as Ye Ting
- Zhao Lusi as Liu Qingyang
- Tong Dawei as Zhang Renjie
- Alen Fang as Gao Junyu
- Ouyang Nana as Tao Hsuan
- Tong Liya as Soong Ai-ling
- Cao Jun as Zhang Xue
- Zhang Jingyi as Soong Mei-ling
- Xue Jianing as He Shufen
- Hu Lianxin as Cheng Junying
- Zhou You as Kuang Husheng
- Lin Gengxin
- Li Xian

== Production ==
Shooting began on 1 July 2020 and took place in Shanghai and finished filming on November 5 of that same year. Zheng Shuang, who played Xiang Jingyu, was removed from the film for surrogacy scandal; Yan Xujia's role was removed after rumors Yan had cheated on his girlfriend.

== Music ==
No.	Title	Lyrics	Music	Singer(s)	Length
1.	"The Internationale" (Theme)	Eugène Edine Pottier	Pierre De Geyter	Sun Nan/ Zhou Shen

== Release ==
1921 released on 1 July 2021 in China.

== Reception ==
=== Box office ===
Ahead of its 1 July debut, the film made $11.6 million from pre-screenings. According to the China Movie Data Information Network, the film took 81.60 million yuan ($12.6 million) on its opening day, and 44.2 million yuan the next day. The film earned a total of 300 million yuan ($46.32 million) in its first four days of release.

=== Critical response ===
Despite being a state-sanctioned production, the film was criticized online by Chinese nationalists as overly commercial and disrespectful to the real-life revolutionary figures depicted. Following the release of the film's posters and cast list in May, users criticized the casting of younger stars as mocking the historical figures they were playing. The South China Morning Post described audience reactions as mixed.

== Accolades ==
Date	Award	Category	Recipient(s) and nominee(s)	Result	Notes
2021	34th Golden Rooster Awards	Best Writing	Yu Xi, Huang Xin and Zhao Ningyu	Won	
2021	34th Golden Rooster Awards	Best Director	Huang Jianxin and Zheng Dasheng	Nominated	
2021	34th Golden Rooster Awards	Best Supporting Actress	Zhou Ye	Nominated	
2021	34th Golden Rooster Awards	Best Cinematography	Cao Yu	Nominated	
2021	34th Golden Rooster Awards	Best Sound Recording	Yang Jingyi	Nominated	
2021	34th Golden Rooster Awards	Best Editing	Yu Baiyang	Nominated	
