= Wang Zhi (actress) =

Chinese actress (born 1982)

- 王智
- Born: July 29, 1982 (age 44); Anshan, Liaoning, China
- Education: Central Academy of Drama
- Occupation: Actress
- Years active: 2007–present
- Notable work: Goodbye Mr. Loser

Wang Zhi (Chinese: 王智; pinyin: Wāng Zhì; born July 29, 1982) is a Chinese actress. She first rose to prominence in 2015 for playing Qiu Ya in the comedy film Goodbye Mr. Loser, which placed third at the box office with US$226.6 million in China.

== Biography ==
=== Early life and education ===
A native of Anshan, Liaoning, she started to learn martial arts at the age of five. In 2004, she enrolled at the Central Academy of Drama, where she studied alongside Tong Liya. After graduation in 2008, she became a village official in Zhangzikou Village (张自口村) of Yangsong Town (杨宋镇) near Beijing. She worked there for three years.

== Career ==
Wang's first role was a nurse uncredited appearance in the television series Witness (2007).

In 2008, she has appeared in a number of television productions, such as Eighteen Years in Enemy Camp, One Hundred Years of History, and Fruit of marriage.

In 2011, she got a small role in the historical television series All Men Are Brothers, adapted from Shi Nai'an's classical novel Water Margin.

In 2012, she was cast in Ma Yongzhen, playing the sister of Danny Chan Kwok-kwan's character.

In 2013, she had a cameo appearance in Ju Jueliang's The Patriot Yue Fei, a historical television series starring Huang Xiaoming, Ruby Lin, Gallen Lo, and Cheng Pei-pei. She had a supporting role in Painted Skin 2, opposite Hawick Lau and Michelle Bai. That same year, she was cast in the film Drug War, playing the wife of Louis Koo's character. She also provided the voice for Hong Tailang in the animated comedy film I Love Wolffy 2.

In 2014, she co-starred with Hawick Lau and Zanilia Zhao in the romantic comedy television series The Wife's Secret.

In 2015, she played Qiu Ya, the lead role in the comedy film Goodbye Mr. Loser, costarring Shen Teng and Ma Li. It was released in September 2015, and was instantly a huge critical and box office success. The film grossed US$226.6 million in China, and US$228.5 million worldwide. She won the Most Potentiality Award at the Macau International Movie Festival, and was nominated for Best Actress at the 33rd Hundred Flowers Awards.

In 2016, she appeared in Kwak Jae-yong's Crying Out In Love, a film adaptation based on the novel Socrates in Love by Kyoichi Katayama.

== Filmography ==
=== Film ===
| Year | English title | Chinese title | Role | Notes |
|---|---|---|---|---|
| 2013 | Drug War | 毒战 | Cai Tianming's wife | |
| 2013 | I Love Wolffy 2 | 我爱灰太狼2 | Hong Tailang | |
| 2015 | Goodbye Mr. Loser | 夏洛特烦恼 | Qiu Ya | |
| 2016 | Island Dream | 梦寻巴厘岛 | Mei Xiaomei | |
| 2016 | Crying Out In Love | 在世界中心呼唤爱 | Sun Jiaolian | |
| 2017 | Kungfu Traveler | 功夫机器侠 | Xu Ziying | |
| 2017 | Never Say Die | 羞羞的铁拳 | guest appearance | |
| 2018 | Oolong Courtyard: KungFu School | 新乌龙院之笑闹江湖 | Lucy | |
| 2019 | The Wandering Earth | 流浪地球 | Liu Qi's mum | |
| 2019 | The Human Comedy | 人间喜剧 | Mi Li | |
| 2020 | Warm Hug | 温暖的抱抱 | Baobao's mum | |
| 2020 | Hard to Rescue | 玩命的营救 | | |
| 2020 | Island Dream | 梦寻巴厘岛 | | |
| 2020 | Fighting！Dude | 奋斗吧，青年 | | |
| 2021 | Deep Love | 不是深圳没有爱情 | | |
| 2026 | Probation | 我没错！ | Wang Haiyan | |
| TBA | Handsome, Go Away | 欧巴，你好帅 | Xiaoxi | |

=== Television ===
| Year | English title | Chinese title | Role | Notes |
|---|---|---|---|---|
| 2007 | Witness | 目击者 | Xiao Ye | |
| 2008 | Eighteen Years in Enemy Camp | 敌营十八年之虎胆雄心 | | |
| 2008 | One Hundred Years of History | 百年往事 | Zhizhi | |
| 2008 | Fruit of marriage | 喜临门 | Yu Rong | |
| 2009 | The Three sisters in Hebei | 冀东三枝花 | Zheng Wanru | |
| 2011 | All Men Are Brothers | 水浒传 | Jin Zhi | |
| 2011 | | 战火中青春之血染风采 | Pan Shiqi | |
| 2012 | Miracle | 奇迹 | Gao Yan | |
| 2012 | Ma Yongzhen | 马永贞 | Bai Xiaodie | |
| 2012 | Island Falcon | 孤岛飞鹰 | Zheng Yashu | |
| 2013 | The Patriot Yue Fei | 精忠岳飞 | Wu Shima | |
| 2013 | Painted Skin 2 | 画皮之真爱无悔 | Fu Qu | |
| 2014 | The Wife's Secret | 妻子的秘密 | Ning Xia | |
| 2016 | 38th Parallel | 三八线 | Li Zhenying | |
| 2016 | Les Interprètes | 亲爱的翻译官 | Wang Linlin | |
| 2017 | | 超级翁婿 | | |

== Drama ==
| Year | English title | Chinese title | Role | Notes |
|---|---|---|---|---|
| 2006 | | 蒸得舒服 | Na Jia | |
| 2008 | Pan Jinlian | 潘金莲 | Pan Jinlian | |
| 2009 | | 你在红楼我在西游 | White Bone Demon | |
| 2009 | Strange Interlude | 奇异的插曲 | Ma Delan | |
| 2019 | A Love So Beautiful | | | |

== TV shows ==
| Year | English title | Chinese title | Role | Notes |
|---|---|---|---|---|
| 2016 | The Adventures of the West | 西游奇遇记 | guest | |
| 2016 | Twenty-Four Hours | 二十四小时 | guest | |
| 2016 | Surprise Journey | 惊喜旅程 | guest | |
| 2016 | Star Courses | 明星课程表 | guest | |
| 2016 | Challenger Alliance | 挑战者联盟 | guest | |
| 2016 | Scream! Passerby | 尖叫吧！路人 | guest | |
| 2020 | Sisters Who Make Waves | 乘风破浪的姐姐 | contestant | |

== Film and TV Awards ==
| Year | Nominated work | Award | Result | Notes |
|---|---|---|---|---|
| 2016 | Goodbye Mr. Loser | Macau International Movie Festival - Most Potentiality Award | Won | |
| 2016 | Goodbye Mr. Loser | Macau International Movie Festival - Best Newcomer | Nominated | |
| 2016 | Goodbye Mr. Loser | 33rd Hundred Flowers Awards - Best Actress | Nominated | |
