= Ouyang Nana =

Chinese singer (born 2000)

- 歐陽娜娜
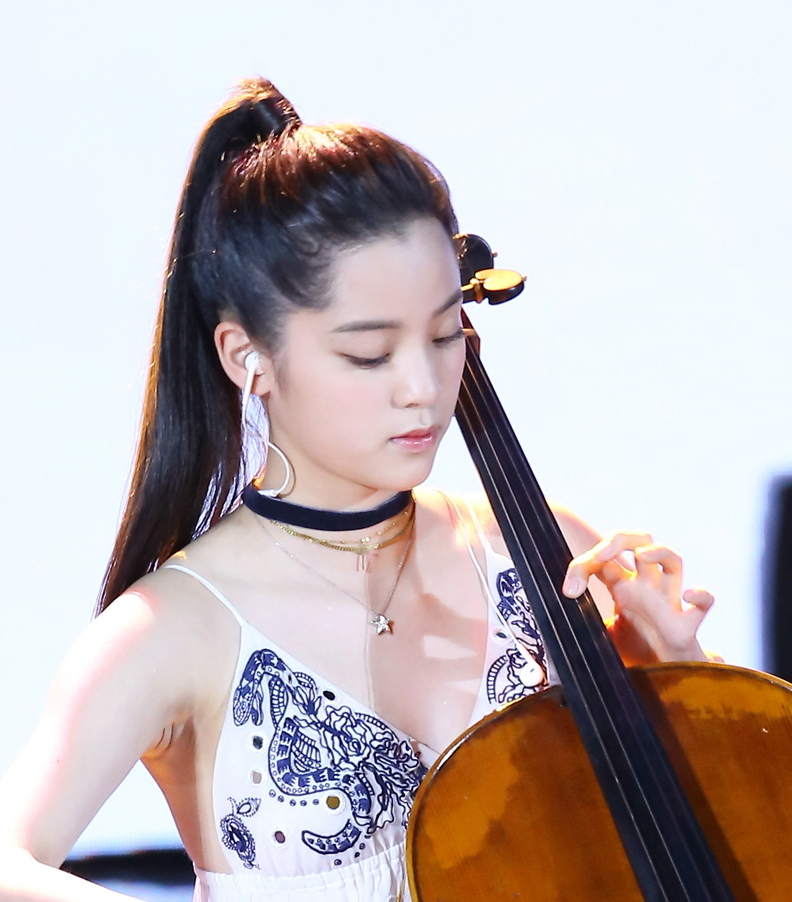
- Ouyang in 2017
- Born: June 15, 2000 (age 26); Taipei, Taiwan
- Education: Berklee College of Music; Curtis Institute of Music
- Occupations: Actress; singer; musician
- Years active: 2014–present
- Agent: Sony Music Entertainment China
- Parent(s): Ouyang Lung; Fu Chuen
- Relatives: Ouyang Fei Fei (aunt)
- Musical career
- Genres: C-pop; Mandopop
- Instruments: Vocals; piano; cello; guitar
- Years active: 2016–present
- Labels: Sony Music Entertainment China; Universal Music

Chinese name
- Traditional Chinese: 歐陽娜娜
- Simplified Chinese: 欧阳娜娜
- Hanyu Pinyin: Ōuyáng Nànà
- Jyutping: Au1joeng4 Naa4naa4

Ouyang Nana (Chinese: 歐陽娜娜; pinyin: Ōuyáng Nànà; born June 15, 2000) is a Chinese singer, musician and actress from Taiwan. A member of the Ouyang family, known for its artistic background in Taiwan, she has primarily focused her career in mainland China, known for films Beijing Love Story (2014) and Secret Fruit (2017), TV series Yes! Mr. Fashion (2016), and variety show The Birth of An Actor (2017).

== Career ==
=== Music ===
Inspired by cellist Mei-Ying Liao, Ouyang Nana started playing the guitar at the age of four, piano at the age of five and cello at the age of six. She won first place in cello and guitar and second place in piano at the Wenhua Taiwan Cup Music Competition in Taiwan. She started attending the music program at Dunhua Elementary School (敦化國民小學) in 2008 and graduated from the school in 2012 with top honors.

In 2010, she was admitted to study cello at the Affiliated Junior High School of National Taiwan Normal University. The same year, she became the principal cellist of the Century Youth Orchestra. In 2011, she took first place in the Grand Taiwan National Music Competition in both the cello and string quartet categories and first place in the National Music Competition of Taiwan. She has also participated in the National Cello Institute Summer Festival in the U.S. and 2011 Salut Summer Festival in Taitung.

In 2012, Ouyang became the youngest cellist to give a solo recital debut in Concert Hall of Taiwan. The same year, she won the First Award at the Taiwan School Year 100 National Music Competition and was accepted to the junior high music program at National Taiwan Normal University. In 2013, Ouyang began attending the Curtis Institute of Music in Philadelphia, but left in 2015 to focus on her career. She then signed with Universal Music and released her solo debut classical album 15. In 2016, she released her first single, "Warming Your Winter," for her first television drama, Yes! Mr. Fashion. In 2017, she released her second album, Cello Loves Disney. In December, she performed at the awards ceremony for the 2018 Breakthrough Prize, where she performed a rendition of "See You Again" alongside American rapper Wiz Khalifa. Ouyang became the first Asian person to perform at the event.

In September 2018, she resumed her studies at the Berklee College of Music, where she studied cello with Mike Block. She graduated in 2024 with a diploma but did not earn a bachelor's degree.

=== Acting ===
Ouyang first attracted attention with her appearance in the 2014 romance film, Beijing Love Story where she played a cellist. She next starred in the sports film To the Fore, where she was nominated for the Best Supporting Actress at the Macau International Film Festival.

In 2016, she began filming for the science fiction film, Bleeding Steel with Jackie Chan. The same year, she made her small-screen debut in the romance comedy drama Yes! Mr. Fashion opposite Chen Xuedong.

In 2017, she was cast as the female lead in the youth film Secret Fruit, based on the novel of the same name by Rao Xueman.

In 2018, she was cast as the female lead in the fantasy adventure drama The Great Ruler opposite Roy Wang.

== Politics ==
On March 6, 2019, the Kuomintang (KMT) held a Central Standing Committee meeting, after which the party spokesperson Ouyang Lung, Nana's father, communicated its stance on cross-strait policy: maintaining the status quo of “no unification, no independence, no use of force” under the framework of the “Constitution of the Republic of China.” His remarks were framed by some mainland Chinese netizens as supporting Taiwanese independence. On March 21, 2019, Beijing TV censored Ouyang Nana's image in its program. Later that day, her studio issued a statement, saying that Ouyang Nana was already 18, "an adult with her independent thinking" who opposed Taiwan independence. She soon reposted her studio, saying: "As an overseas student, [I] often get asked 'where do you come from?' I come from China. This is my answer." She said:" I have a good relationship with both of my parental and maternal grandparents since I was young. I grew up hearing Sichuan dialect, and they said that people should not forget about their roots wherever they go. I am proud of being Chinese. I will remember that my hometown is Ji'an Jiangxi [sic]. I will never forget how touched I was when I saw my name on the old Genealogy."

Many Chinese netizens remained unsatisfied with her statement on Weibo, where most international brands typically limit their responses to appeal to the Chinese market when addressing such political issues. Facing popular demands that she post the statement on Facebook, Instagram, and YouTube—platforms banned in China—to demonstrate her loyalty, she ultimately did. On March 22, 2019, Ouyang Lung responded to the media, saying "from my [cultural and] political background, I support One China and 1992 Consensus". He said he was saddened by the mistreatment his daughter had garnered "simply by saying the status quo" and said that the Democratic Progressive Party should take responsibility for Cross-Strait relations.

In March 2021, she announced support for cotton from Xinjiang in mainland China, after some companies had expressed concerns about human rights abuses of Uyghurs at the Xinjiang re-education camps. In 2024, Ouyang came out in support of a China Central Television (CCTV) statement in favor of Chinese unification. In 2025, Taiwan's Mainland Affairs Council announced that Ouyang was under investigation for sharing Chinese government propaganda and may face fines. In December 2025, Ouyang reposted a post by CCTV in Weibo announcing the Justice Mission 2025 military exercises around Taiwan, adding her own caption which read "#Taiwan has always been Chinese territory# There is only one China!".

== Discography ==
=== Albums ===
Title	Album details	Sales
15	Released: December 18, 2015; Label: Universal; Formats: Digital download, streaming	—N/a
Cello Loves Disney (梦想练习曲)	Released: June 16, 2017; Label: Universal; Formats: Digital download, streaming	—N/a
Live Today	Released: September 5, 2022; Label: Taihe Music Group; Formats: Digital download, streaming; Track listing: 1. Ringtone (Intro); 2. 1-4-3; 3. Saving; 4. One More Day; 5. Liar; 6. Goodbye; 7. Sorry; 8. Live Today; 9. Falling Back To You; 10. Bedtime Story; 11. Nocture (Outro)	—N/a
The Star 初星	Released: August 21, 2023; Label: Taihe Music Group; Formats: Digital download, streaming; Track listing: 1. 雨 2. Lilith; 3. 不知道; 4. 今日三两事; 5. 玛格丽特 (feat. KnowKnow); 6. 狗勾; 7. 镜子; 8. 烦恼盒子; 9. 二十二; 10. Mama Said	—N/a

=== Extended plays ===
Title	Album details	Sales
NANA I	Released: June 9, 2020; Label: Sony Music Entertainment China; Formats: Digital download, streaming; Track listing: 1. The Best For You; 2. Tell Me You Do Too; 3. To Be Happy	—N/a
NANA II	Released: November 6, 2020; Label: Sony Music Entertainment China; Formats: Digital download, streaming; Track listing: 1. Gemini (雙子); 2. Alike (仿生人); 3. Secret Garden (未曾許諾的花園)	—N/a

=== Singles ===
Year	English title	Chinese title	Album	Notes
2016	"Warming Your Winter"	溫暖你的冬	Yes! Mr. Fashion OST	
2017	"The Secret Words"	秘语	Secret Fruit OST	with Chen Feiyu
2017	"For My 17-year-old Self"	给17岁的自己	Secret Fruit OST	
2017	"17-year-old, I've Got Something to Say"	17岁的我, 有些话想说	Secret Fruit OST	
2018	"Tree Hollow"	树洞	—N/a	
2019	"To Me"		—N/a	
2020	"One Heart One Thought"	一心一念	The Great Ruler OST	
2020	"I Don't Gotta Know"		—N/a	with Fan Chengcheng
2021	"At Last"	藏		

== Filmography ==
=== Film ===
Year	English title	Chinese title	Role	Notes
2014	Beijing Love Story	北京爱情故事	Liu Xingyang	
2015	To the Fore	破风	Chen Yiqiao	
2016	Mission Milano	王牌逗王牌	Luo Jiaxin	
2017	Beautiful Accident	美好的意外	Xing Xing	
2017	Secret Fruit	秘果	Yu Chizi	
2017	Bleeding Steel	机器之血	Nancy	
2019	The Opera House	武动天地	Qiao Ling	
2021	1921	1921	Tao Hsuan	

=== Television series ===
Year	English title	Chinese title	Role	Notes
2016	Yes! Mr. Fashion	是！尚先生	Lu Xiaokui	
2020	The Great Ruler	大主宰	Luo Li	
2024	Snowfall	如月	Mi Lan	

=== Television shows ===
Year	English title	Chinese title	Role	Notes
2015	Up Idol	偶像来了	Cast member	
2018	Ace vs Ace Season 3	王牌对王牌 3	Emcee	
2018–2019	Sister's Flower Shop	小姐姐的花店	Host	
2019	My Agent and I	我和我的经纪人	Host	
2019	The Big Band	乐队的夏天 第一季	Host	
2019	Attention, All Visitors	各位游客请注意	Cast member	
2019	Life Photo Studio	人生照相馆	Visual director	
2020	Fourtry 2	潮流合伙人2	Cast member	
2020	The Coming One	明日之子乐团季	Mentor	
2020	Wonderful Time	美好的时光	Cast member	
2021	Spring is Sprouting	春新萌动	Cast member	
2021	Miracles Beside You and Me	奇遇·人間角落	Host	
2022	The Detectives' Adventures	萌探探探案 第二季	Cast member	
2022	Hello Summer	相遇的夏天	Panelist	

== Awards and nominations ==
Year	Award	Category	Nominated work	Result	Ref.
2016	Hito Music Awards	iQiyi Popularity Award	"Warming Your Winter"	Won	
2017	31st Japan Gold Disc Award	Best 3 New Artist	15	Won	
2017	17th Top Chinese Music Awards	Most Anticipated Promising Idol	15	Won	
2019	8th iQiyi All-Star Carnival	Best Live Singer	—N/a	Won	
2019	Jinri Toutiao Awards Ceremony	Music Creator of the Year	—N/a	Won	
2020	Weibo Awards Ceremony	Rising Artist of the Year	—N/a	Won	
2020	Forbes	China Celebrity 100 list	—N/a	73rd	
