= Somewhere Winter =

- Traditional Chinese: 大約在冬季
- Simplified Chinese: 大约在冬季
- Hanyu Pinyin: Dàyuë Zài Dōngjì
- Directed by: Wang Weiming
- Written by: Rao Xueman
- Produced by: Huang Zhiming
- Starring: Wallace Huo; Ma Sichun
- Production companies: Beijing Dinosaur Film Co., Ltd. Zhejiang Hengdian Film Co., Ltd. Tianjin Maoyan Weiying Culture Media
- Release date: 15 November 2019 (China)
- Country: China
- Language: Mandarin

Somewhere Winter (Chinese: 大约在冬季) is a 2019 Chinese teen romance film written by Rao Xueman and directed by Wang Weiming. It stars Wallace Huo and Ma Sichun. The film follows the love story of An Ran, a student of Beijing Normal University, and Qi Xiao, a Taiwanese photographer. The film premiered in China on November 15, 2019.

== Cast ==
- Wallace Huo as Qi Xiao, a Taiwanese photographer developing his career in Beijing.
- Ma Sichun as An Ran, a student of Beijing Normal University.
- Wei Daxun as Yu Feng, classmate and best friend of An Ran, son of a professor.
- Zhang Yao as Sun Yaoyao, An Ran's best friend.
- Austin Lin as Qi Yitian, son of Qi Xiao.
- Wen Qi as Yu Xiaonian, daughter of An Ran, a Chinese American who was raised in Los Angeles.
- Patty Hou as Ye Yuchen
- Chyi Chin as Chyi Chin

== Soundtrack ==
No.	Title	Singer(s)	Length
1.	"An Ran (安然)" (Opening theme)	Ma Sichun
2.	"Winter Without You (没有你的冬季)" (Ending theme)	Ayunga
3.	"It's a Pity (可惜了)" (Ending theme)	Chyi Chin, Karen Mok

== Production ==
In 2015, Chyi Chin and Rao Xueman discussed making his song Possibly in Winter or Around the Winter Season (大约在冬季) into a film. Based on the song, Rao Xueman wrote a novel, which was published in 2018. The film is adapted from Rao Xueman's eponymous novel.

Shooting began on February 15, 2019 and ended on April 19, 2019.

This film was shot in Beijing, Tianjin, Taipei and Los Angeles.

== Release ==
On October 11, 2019, the first official trailer for the film was released along with a teaser poster.

The film premiered in Shanghai on November 11, 2019 with wide-release in China on November 15, 2019.

== Reception ==
The film is rated just 5.3/10 on Douban, the influential Chinese film reviews website.
