= Luz (2025 film) =

2025 Chinese-Hong Kong film by Flora Lau

- Theatrical poster
- Traditional Chinese: 花明渡
- Hanyu Pinyin: Huā Míng Dù
- Jyutping: Faa^{1} Ming^{4} Dou^{6}
- Directed by: Flora Lau
- Written by: Flora Lau
- Produced by: Yvette Tang; Flora Lau; Stephen Lam; Joseph Sinn Gi Chan
- Starring: Isabelle Huppert; Sandrine Pinna; Guo Xiaodong; Huang Lu; David Chiang; Deng Enxi
- Cinematography: Benjamín Echazarreta
- Edited by: Flora Lau; Fernando Epstein; Denis Bedlow
- Music by: Mimi Xu
- Animation by: Noid Studios; CGEV
- Production company: LUZ PRODUCTION LTD.
- Release date: 2025
- Running time: 102 minutes
- Countries: Hong Kong; China
- Languages: Mandarin; French; English; Cantonese

Luz (Chinese: 花明渡, stylized as LUZ) is a 2025 film written, directed, edited and produced by Flora Lau. A Hong Kong-Chinese co-production, it is Lau's second feature film since Bends, starring Isabelle Huppert, Sandrine Pinna, Guo Xiaodong, Huang Lu, David Chiang, and Deng Enxi.

== Synopsis ==
The film follows the lives of two people. Wei searches for his estranged daughter, Fa, throughout Chongqing, and Ren, a gallerist in Hong Kong, contends with her ailing stepmother, Sabine, who lives in Paris. The two meet in a virtual reality world with a quest to capture an elusive, mystic deer, which unexpected sparks a journey of discovery and connection.

== Cast ==
- Isabelle Huppert as Sabine, Ren's stepmother
- Sandrine Pinna as Ren, a gallerist
- Guo Xiaodong as Wei, a karaoke bar worker
- Huang Lu as Hong
- David Chiang as Boss Qiu
- Deng Enxi as Fa, Wei's daughter
- Ren Yu as Ma, Wei's coworker
- Zhang Yunyao as Gang, painter
- Mimi Xu as Mimi, Sabine's assistant
- Yvette Tang as Lan, Ren's boss
- Kaori Ito as dancer
- Aric Chen as A.I. bartender
- Wong Ping as A.I. bartender 2

== Production ==
=== Writing ===
The screenplay was written by Flora Lau and verified by Cinéfondation of Festival de Cannes in 2015.

The title of the film is the Latin word for light and it refers natural light. The words in the Chinese title "花明渡" mean flower (花; huā), illumination (明; míng), and journey (渡; dù). The first two words "花明" are borrowed from a famous ancient Chinese poem by Lu You from Song Dynasty.

=== Filming ===
Luz was shot in Mainland China, Hong Kong SAR, and France. Principal photography began in May 2018 in Chongqing. The director of photography was Benjamin Echazaretta, a reputable French-Chilean cinematographer, who had worked with other well-known directors with Oscar-nominated films. To ensure the core qualities of the film, gaffer and sound engineers from France followed the entire filming of LUZ in different countries.

=== Costumes ===
Award-winning production designers Alfred Yau (邱偉明) from Hong Kong and Mila Preli from France and costume designers Miggy Cheng (鄭秀嫻) and Khadija Zeggaï contributed essential efforts to the film. Besides costumes that were specially made by costume designer Miggy Cheng for the main characters, stylish pieces from various designer brands, including Loewe, Dries Van Noten, Lemaire, Shang Xia, Yohji Yamamoto, Comme des Garçons were used to outfit the characters. The ensembles worn by the casts in the VR world are from the Australian fashion brand, Song for the Mute.

=== Artworks ===
The film has included numerous artworks by world acclaimed artists, including Chinese painter Yan Pei-Ming, French photographer/director Antoine d'Agata, Chinese painter Gao Ludi, Hong Kong exciting animator Wong Ping and painters Afa Lee and Prodip Leung, and others. Both the real and the replica of the deer painting, Twilight Forest, were painted by renowned Chinese painter Zhang Yunyao, who resides in Paris. The stylized opening credits shown in neon light graphics are works by Japanese artist based in France, Tom Kan.

=== Dance ===
Japanese dancer and choreographer Kaori Ito, who is known for her signature dance style and awarded the Chevalier of the Ordre des Arts et des Lettres by France in 2015, participated in the film as the dancer collaborating with the character Sabine, played by Isabelle Huppert. Ito created the dance, "Rebirth", especially for the film and performed in it.

=== Music ===
The score, by French-Chinese composer Mimi Xu, consisted of a wide range of genres, from classical music with piano and string instruments to electronic tracks with heavy beats. Songs used in the film have just as a vast variety—from "Group Exercise" by Chinese-American rapper Bohan Phoenix to "J'en déduis que je t'aime" by Charles Aznavour, a classic French ballade from the 60's. The great range of music was carefully composed and chosen to set the film's balance of classic and modern elements, style and values, in terms of the messages of the story, the visuals as well as Flora Lau's film language.

=== Post-production ===
Animation and VFX were done in France by Noid and CGEV. The editing was done by Flora Lau with help from Fernando Epstein and Denis Bedlow. Color-grading was done by Marc Boucrot.

The post-production was completed in Paris in late 2019, and further fine-tuned in Hong Kong until 2025.

== Release ==
The film debuted at the Sundance Film Festival on the festival's opening day of January 23, 2025 in the World Cinema Dramatic Competition category, which shortlists ten international films every year, among the over 17,000 films from 150 countries submitted to the festival. Isabelle Huppert was not able to attend due to her performances in two stage plays that were touring in Italy and the United States.

Following the world premiere, the film had 6 other screenings in Park City and Salt Lake City at Sundance 2025. Screening tickets were sold out promptly upon the opening of ticket sales on the first day.

== Critical reception ==
Carlos Aguilar of Variety praised Luz for its "dazzling, otherworldly frames" of Chongqing's cityscape and its "mesmerizing" virtual reality realm, but noted that it lacks a compelling narrative beyond its "seductive stylization", ultimately failing to examine familial disconnection in a "meaningful" way. Drew Burnett Gregory of Autostraddle also found the film to be "formally enchanting", particularly the clever overlapping of the real world and the video game, which creates a sense of "heightened rapture" that captures the characters' sadness and longing. Anzhe Zhang of Slant Magazine, giving the film 2.5/4 stars, observed a "lack of emotional details in the film's character arcs, which both end in understated and abrupt ways" but lauded the film's use of virtual reality as a means of establishing connection and raising questions about "modern intimacy and alienation". Elizabeth Weitzman of TheWrap wrote that Lau's script occasionally felt "black-and-white in its themes... we do notice when she laps into clichéd terrain".

Beandera July of IndieWire gave the film a C+, finding that it "raises more questions than it yet knows how to answer", and while it features "lush" visuals and a strong mise-en-scène, it ultimately feels "largely an intellectual exercise" that suffers from emotional distance and is "more like an underdeveloped proof of concept than a fully realized narrative". Jordan Mintzer of The Hollywood Reporter also found the film to be an "ambitious experiment" that "jumps between locations and protagonists without much warning," ultimately appreciating its "powerful imagery" and immersive experience, but notes that the real-life narrative is unconvincing, making the film feel more like a "visual piece than a full-fledged feature" that "often strains to create drama". Brian Tallerico of RogerEbert.com offered another negative review, calling the film "frustrating" and noting that it has "almost nothing to say", as it jumbles its themes and characters in a "desperate need of a focusing rewrite", ultimately making it feel as shallow as the virtual worlds it portrays.

Brian Truitt of USA Today remarked that the film "does offer an immersive, neon-drenched digital world nicely fleshed out with relatable humanity." Gabe Miller of The Industry stated that "by the end of Luz we understand something profound: the best virtual reality is the one we create in real life. Finding our own private realms and overlaying our emotional shape and resonance to it. That's where true connection can be found." Kristy Puchko of Mashable described the film to be "pensive and poetic, this family drama is sure to find devotees enchanted by Lau's unique vision."

The Montage Review pointed out that "one particularly fascinating aspect of the film is the differing ways individuals express care for their family members," as "the film illustrates how the choices we make in expressing our individual life philosophies can inadvertently hurt those who do not share the same approaches or beliefs." It praises the film as "certainly a work that will leave your eyes marveling and your mind pondering."
