= Ma Sichun =

Chinese actress

- 马思纯
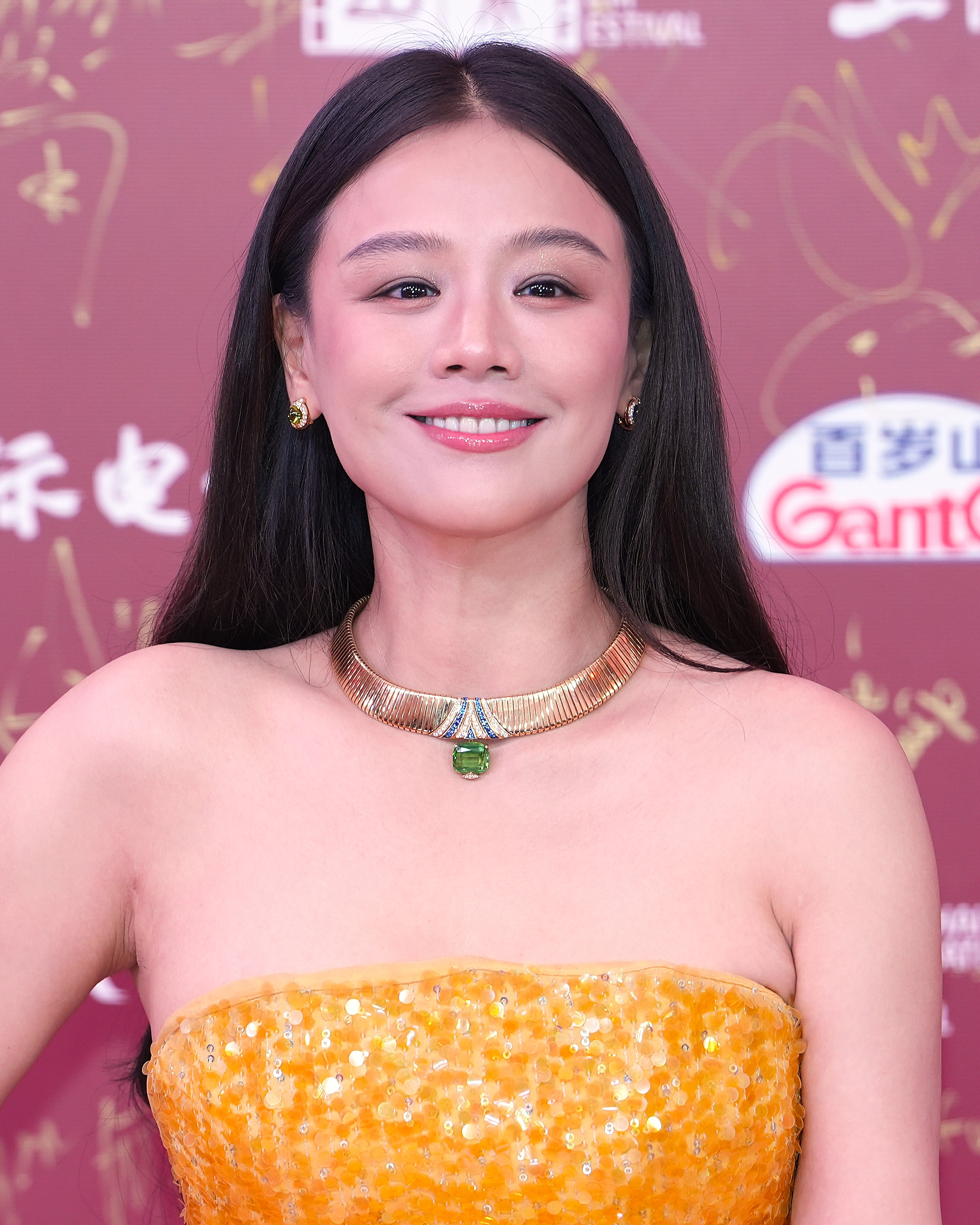
- Ma at 2026 Shanghai International Film Festival
- Born: March 14, 1988 (age 38); Bengbu, Anhui, China
- Other name: Sandra Ma
- Education: Communication University of China
- Occupation: Actress
- Years active: 2001–present
- Agent: Easy Entertainment
- Relatives: Jiang Wenli (aunt)
- Awards: Golden Horse Award

Chinese name
- Simplified Chinese: 马思纯
- Traditional Chinese: 馬思純
Transcriptions
Standard Mandarin
- Hanyu Pinyin: Mǎ Sīchún

Sandra Ma Sichun (Chinese: 马思纯, born 14 March 1988) is a Chinese actress. She is noted for her roles in the films The Left Ear (2015) and Soul Mate (2016); and for the series Love Me If You Dare (2015), Age of Legends (2018), and You Are My Hero (2021). In 2016, she won the Golden Horse Award for Best Leading Actress for the film Soul Mate. In 2017, Forbes China listed Ma under "30 Under 30 Asia" category, for her professional contributions.

== Early life ==
Ma was born in Bengbu, Anhui on March 14, 1988 in a Hui family. Her mother is Jiang Wenjuan and her aunt is a Chinese actress Jiang Wenli. She studied at the Communication University of China in the Department of Broadcasting.

== Career ==
=== 1995–2014: Beginnings ===
At the age of seven, Ma began her acting career with a role in The Winter of Three Persons; and in 2001, she starred in The Grand Mansion Gate, both alongside her aunt Jiang Wenli.

Ma became well known after serving as the cover model for Rao Xueman's novel Joy & Sorrow. She starred as a lead in the series Lover, based on the novel Daddy, I have your baby, director by Shen Yan. In 2012, Ma won the Golden Phoenix Awards for Best Newcomer for her performance in the film Time Flies Soundlessly.

=== 2015–present: Rising popularity ===
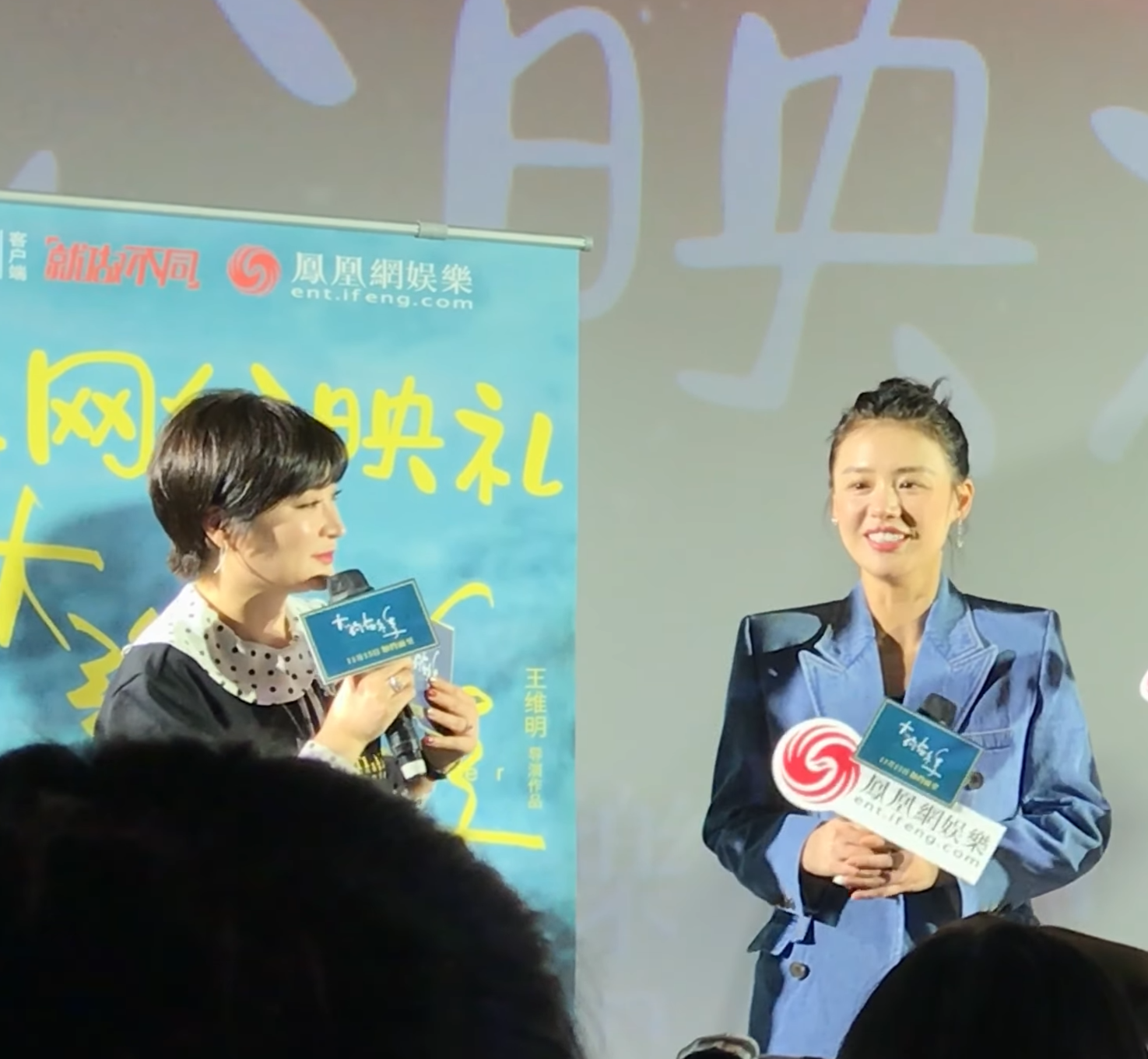
Ma (right) at the premiere of the movie Somewhere Winter (2019)

Ma achieved wider recognition after starring in the coming-of-age film The Left Ear, directed by Alec Su. Her role as the rebellious "Li Bala" was critically acclaimed and she was nominated as Best Supporting Actress at the Golden Horse Awards. Later, she starred alongside Wallace Huo in the crime drama Love Me If You Dare, which further advanced her popularity.

In 2016, Ma starred in adventure film Time Raiders, based on the popular tomb-raiding novel series Daomu Biji. She starred in romance film Soul Mate, playing a rebellious girl; which earned her the Golden Horse Award for Best Leading Actress alongside Zhou Dongyu. In 2017, Ma starred as a female lead in the third installment of the Detective Dee by Tsui Hark. She also starred in the campus romance film Nuts.

In 2018, Ma starred alongside William Chan in the crime action drama Age of Legends. She also starred in chinese variety show Who's the Keyman. In 2019, She starred in Lou Ye's crime film, The Shadow Play; and romance drama film Somewhere Winter written by Rao Xueman. She starred in period romance film Love After Love, directed by Ann Hui. She comedy drama Mr. Fighting alongside Deng Lun.

In 2021, Ma starred as a doctor in the military-medical romance drama You Are My Hero alongside Bai Jingting, which ranked 1st and gained over 1.35B views on Tencent. Later, she starred in youth drama film Wild Grass.

== Filmography ==
=== Film ===
Year	Title	Chinese title	Role	Notes/Ref.
1995	The Winter of Three Persons	三个人的冬天		
2008	Lost	秘岸	Qingqing	
2010	Lan	我们天上见	Xiaocui	
2012	Time Flies Soundlessly	岁月无声	Yang Duoduo	
2014	One Minute More	我的男友和狗	Dazhi's mother	
2014	Baixiang	白相	Young Lan	
2015	The Left Ear	左耳	Li Bala	
2015	Saving Mr. Wu	解救吾先生	Liu Yun	
2016	Time Raiders	盗墓笔记	A Ning	
2016	Soul Mate	七月与安生	Lin Qiyue	
2017	Goldbuster	妖铃铃		Cameo
2018	Nuts	奇葩朵朵	Zhu Zhu	
2018	Detective Dee: The Four Heavenly Kings	狄仁杰之四大天王	Shui Yue	
2019	The Shadow Play	风中有朵雨做的云	Xiao Nuo	
2019	Somewhere Winter	大约在冬季	An Ran	
2020	Wild Grass	荞麦疯长	Yun Qiao	
2020	Love After Love	第一炉香	Ge Weilong	
2022	The Fallen Bridge	断·桥	Wen Xiaoyu	
2026	Now I Met Her	我的妈耶	Li Dongyu	
2026	Crossing A Dawn	今晚正好	Xu Qiu	

=== Television series ===
Year	Title	Chinese title	Role	Ref.
2001	The Grand Mansion Gate	大宅门	Bai Yuting	
2010	Lover	恋人	Sichun	
2011	Modern New Human	摩登新人类	Wen Xue	
2012	Refresh	刷新3+7	Xiaomiao	
2013	Fiancee	未婚妻	Lan Xiaoyi	
2014	Love Is the Most Beautiful	爱情最美丽	Ma Xiaocan	
2014	The Empress of China	武媚娘传奇	Helan Minyue	
2015	Love Me If You Dare	他来了，请闭眼	Jian Yao	
2015	The Legend of Mi Yue	芈月传	Wei Yi	
2016	Seventeen Blue	会痛的17岁	Vivi	
2017	Oh My General	将军在上	Ye Zhao	
2018	Age of Legends	橙红年代	Hu Rong	
2019	Mr. Fighting	加油，你是最棒的	Fu Zi	
2021	You Are My Hero	你是我的城池营垒	Mi Ka	
2022	The Crack of Dawn	江照黎明	Li Xiaonan	
2024	Islands	烟火人家	Li Yijin	

== Discography ==
=== Singles ===
Year	English title	Chinese title	Album	Notes/Ref.
2017	"For My 17-year-old Self"	给17岁的自己	Secret Fruit OST	with various artists
2019	"Waiting"	守候	Mr. Fighting OST	
2019	"Somewhere Winter"	大约在冬季	Somewhere Winter OST	with various artists
2020	"Hello 2020"	你好2020		Performance for CCTV Spring Gala with Li Xian, Li Qin, Zhu Yilong & Zhou Dongyu
2020	"colorful days"		Grass OST	

== Accolades ==
=== Awards and nominations ===
Year	Work	Award	Category	Result	Ref.
2013	Time Flies Soundlessly	14th Golden Phoenix Awards	Newcomer Award	Won	
2015	The Left Ear	52nd Golden Horse Awards	Best Supporting Actress	Nominated	
2015	The Left Ear	10th Chinese Young Generation Film Forum Awards	Best New Actress	Won	
2016	Soul Mate	53rd Golden Horse Awards	Best Actress (with Zhou Dongyu)	Won	
2017	Soul Mate	36th Hong Kong Film Awards	Best Actress	Nominated	
2017	Soul Mate	24th Beijing College Student Film Festival	Best Actress	Nominated	
2017	Soul Mate	8th China Film Director's Guild Awards	Best Actress	Nominated	
2017	Soul Mate	17th Chinese Film Media Awards	Best Actress	Nominated	
2017	Soul Mate	2nd Golden Screen Awards	Best Actress	Won	
2017	The Left Ear	16th Golden Phoenix Awards	Society Award	Won	
2018	Oh My General	24th Huading Awards	Best Actress (Ancient Drama)	Nominated	
2018	Soul Mate	34th Hundred Flowers Awards	Best Actress	Nominated	
2019	Mr. Fighting	26th Huading Awards	Best Actress (Modern drama)	Nominated	
2019	Mr. Fighting	Golden Bud - The Fourth Network Film And Television Festival	Best Actress	Nominated	
2020	—N/a	7th The Actors of China Award Ceremony	Best Actress (Emerald)	Nominated	
2020	Wild Grass	12th Macau International Movie Festival	Best Actress	Nominated	
2021	You Are My Hero	26th Asian Television Awards	Best Actress in a Leading Role	Nominated	

=== Forbes China Celebrity 100 ===
Year	Rank	Ref.
2017	79th	
2019	61st	
2020	60th	
