= Arthur Chen =

Chinese actor (born 2000)

Chen Feiyu
- Born: 9 April 2000 (age 26); United States
- Other name: Arthur Chen
- Education: Beijing Jingshan School; Tabor Academy
- Alma mater: Beijing Film Academy
- Occupations: Actor; singer
- Height: 1.88 m (6 ft 2 in)
- Parents: Chen Kaige (father); Chen Hong (mother)
- Relatives: Chen He (cousin)
- Musical career
- Origin: China
- Instruments: Vocals; guitar; piano
- Years active: 2010–present

Chinese name
- Traditional Chinese: 陳飛宇
- Simplified Chinese: 陈飞宇
Transcriptions
Standard Mandarin
- Hanyu Pinyin: Chén Fēiyǔ

Chen Feiyu, also known as Arthur Chen (Chinese: 陈飞宇; born 9 April 2000), is a Chinese actor. He is known for his roles in Secret Fruit (2017), Ever Night (2018), Lighter and Princess (2022), When Destiny Brings the Demon (2025), Love Beyond the Grave (2026), and Love Story in the 1970s (2026).

== Early life and education ==
Arthur Chen was born in the United States on 9 April 2000. He is the second son of director Chen Kaige and actress Chen Hong. He studied at Beijing Jingshan School and Tabor Academy, a private boarding school in Massachusetts. In 2019, he was admitted into Beijing Film Academy. In July 2021, Chen relinquished his United States citizenship and became a Chinese citizen. He graduated from Beijing Film Academy in summer 2023.

== Career ==
=== 2017–2018: Career beginnings ===
Chen first appeared in the 2010 film Sacrifice directed by Chen Kaige, portraying a young King. In 2017, Chen made his official acting debut in the youth drama film Secret Fruit as the male lead. He released his first single "The Secret Words" as the promotional song for the film.

=== 2018–present: Rising popularity ===
In 2018, Chen starred in the historical fantasy drama Ever Night. The drama received positive reviews, and Chen was awarded the Super IP New Actor at the China Literature Award Ceremony and the Best Actor in the historical drama category at the Huading Awards.

In 2019, Chen starred in the youth campus romance film My Best Summer. He won the Best Newcomer awards at the Tokyo International Film Festival and Macau International Film Festival for his performance. In the same year, Forbes China listed Chen on their "Under 30 Asia 2019" list which consisted of 30 influential people under 30 years old who have had a substantial effect in their fields.

In 2020, Chen is set to star in the film Flowers Bloom in the Ashes directed by Chen Kaige; and fantasy wuxia drama Legend of Awakening. The same year Chen was cast in the xianxia drama Immortality alongside Luo Yunxi, based on the novel The Husky and His White Cat Shizun. He entered the Forbes China Celebrity 100 list for the first time, ranking 83rd.

== Controversy ==
In February 2023, paparazzo "Super Photographer Yangyang" released intimate photos of Chen with a married internet influencer "Shi Yilin Ya" (是亦琳吖), who was Chen's fan-site manager during the filming of Secret Fruit. The paparazzo alleged that the two had been in a relationship since 2021. Chen subsequently clarified that neither party had other relationships at the time of their involvement and filed a lawsuit against the paparazzo for invasion of privacy.

In March 2023, five individuals, including "Super Photographer Yangyang," were detained by the Beijing police for 5–7 days for "collaborating with others to disseminate others' private information online." After being released, "Super Photographer Yangyang" posted on Weibo: "My parents taught me to be righteous and brave. I did not spread rumors or take money—I have no regrets." In March 2024, the Beijing Internet Court issued a first-instance judgment, ruling that "Super Photographer Yangyang" had violated Chen's legitimate rights by publishing private photos of him without consent. The court ordered the defendant to issue a public apology and pay damages totaling 150,000 yuan for emotional distress and economic losses. Chen announced that the compensation would be donated to the Red Cross Society in Yanshan County, Shangrao City, Jiangxi Province, to support medical aid and living assistance for Korean War veterans.

== Filmography ==
=== Film ===
| Year | Title | Role | Notes | Ref. |
|---|---|---|---|---|
| 2010 | Sacrifice | Xin Jun | | |
| 2017 | Secret Fruit | Duan Bowen | | |
| 2019 | My Best Summer | Yu Huai | | |
| 2019 | Abominable | Ah Jun (voice) | Mandarin dub | |
| 2019 | My People, My Country | Azhabu | | |
| 2023 | Yesterday Once More | Gu Yuxuan | | |
| 2023 | Flowers from the Ashes | Gu Xinwie | | |
| 2023 | The Volunteers: To the War | Sun Xing | | |
| 2026 | Traces of Justice | Ma Chaoyang | | |

=== Television series ===
| Year | Title | Role | Notes | Ref. |
|---|---|---|---|---|
| 2018 | Ever Night | Ning Que | Main role | |
| 2020 | Legend of Awakening | Lu Ping | Main role | |
| 2022 | Gold Panning | Chen Baojin | Main role | |
| 2022 | Lighter and Princess | Li Xun | Main role | |
| 2025 | Eat Run Love | Gan Yang | Main role | |
| 2025 | When Destiny Brings the Demon | Sima Jiao | Main role | |
| 2026 | Love Story in the 1970s | Fang Muyang | Main role | |
| 2026 | Love Beyond the Grave | Duan Xu | Main role | |
| TBA | Immortality | Mo Ran | Main role | |

== Discography ==
=== Soundtrack appearances ===
List of soundtracks, with selected album details
| Title | Year | Album |
|---|---|---|
| "The Secret Words" (with Ouyang Nana) | 2017 | Secret Fruit OST |
| "For My 17 Years Old Self" (with Ouyang Nana, Ma Sichun, Oho Ou, Guan Xiaotong) | 2017 | Secret Fruit OST |
| "At 17, I Have Something to Say" (with Ouyang Nana, Zou Yuanqing, Zhang Chenghang) | 2017 | Secret Fruit OST |
| "The Best of Us" | 2019 | My Best Summer OST |
| "My Motherland and I" (with Zhou Dongyu, Liu Haoran, Oho Ou, Zhu Yilong | 2019 | My People, My Country OST |
| "Starry Sea" | 2019 | China Movie Channel Young Actors Project |

== Awards and nominations ==
Name of the award ceremony, year presented, category, nominee of the award, and the result of the nomination
| Award ceremony | Year | Category | Nominee / Work | Result | Ref. |
|---|---|---|---|---|---|
| China Literature Award Ceremony | 2019 | Super IP New Actor | Ever Night | Won | |
| Huading Awards | 2019 | Best Actor (Historical Drama) | Ever Night | Won | |
| iQIYI All-Star Carnival | 2019 | Most Promising Silver Screen Artist | Chen Feiyu | Won | |
| Macau International Movie Festival | 2019 | Best Newcomer | My Best Summer | Won | |
| Sohu Fashion Awards | 2019 | Influential Male Star | Chen Feiyu | Won | |
| Tencent Video All Star Awards | 2019 | Leaping Film Actor | My Best Summer | Won | |
| The Actors of China Awards | 2019 | Best Actor in Web Series | Ever Night | Nominated | |
| Tokyo International Film Festival Gold Crane Awards | 2019 | Best Newcomer | My Best Summer | Won | |
| Tokyo International Film Festival Gold Crane Awards | 2019 | Most Popular Actor | My Best Summer | Won | |
| Weibo Awards | 2020 | Rising Artist of the Year | Chen Feiyu | Won | |
