= Fist & Faith =

- Movie Poster
- Simplified Chinese: 青禾男高
- Directed by: Jiang Zhuoyuan
- Screenplay by: Jiang Zhuoyuan; Gu Peipei
- Produced by: Doze Niu
- Starring: Jing Tian; Oho Ou
- Distributed by: Alibaba Pictures
- Release date: July 13, 2017
- Country: China
- Languages: Mandarin; Japanese

Fist & Faith (Chinese: 青禾男高) is a Chinese coming-of-age film directed by Jiang Zhuoyuan, starring Jing Tian and Oho Ou. It was released in China on July 13, 2017.

== Synopsis ==
Set during the 1930s after the Japanese invasion of Manchuria, a teacher and a group of students establish a study club to preserve their language and culture as an act of protest against the foreign invaders. Jing Hao, a gang leader who fell in love with his teacher, Miss Liu Hei (Jing Tian), was building a reading society. Jing Hao needs to choose between his gang or his loved ones

== Cast ==
- Jing Tian
- Oho Ou
- Meisa Kuroki
- Kento Hayashi
- Zhang Ningjiang
- Chou You
- Ding Guansen
- Yin Fang
- Xia En
- Jiang Zongyuan
- Hiroki Nakajima
