= The Left Ear =

- Chinese film poster
- Chinese: 左耳
- Hanyu Pinyin: Zuǒ Ěr
- Directed by: Alec Su
- Screenplay by: Rao Xueman
- Based on: The Left Ear by Rao Xueman
- Produced by: Huang Chih-ming
- Starring: Chen Duling; Ou Hao; Yang Yang; Ma Sichun
- Cinematography: Zhao Fei
- Music by: Nathan Wang
- Production company: Beijing Enlight Pictures
- Release date: 24 April 2015 (China)
- Running time: 117 minutes
- Country: China
- Language: Mandarin
- Budget: $10 million
- Box office: $77.91 million (China)

The Left Ear is a 2015 Chinese coming of age film directed by Alec Su. It is Su's directorial debut, and based upon the novel of the same name by Rao Xueman. Rao also wrote the film's screenplay. Filming completed and went into post production in November 2014, and was slated for release on April 30, 2015, but was moved forward to April 24, 2015.

Many of Su's former co-stars from popular TV series My Fair Princess, Romance in the Rain and Destiny by Love helped him promote the film, including Ruby Lin, Leo Ku, Qin Lan, and Zhao Wei, who sang the theme song. The moderate-budget film became a major box office success, grossing US$78 million.

== Plot ==
Li Er, a 17-year-old-girl, is partially deaf in her left ear. She dreams of having someone whisper sweet nothings into her impaired left ear because it will "go straight to the heart". Li Er has a crush on Xu Yi, a popular guy in school who is handsome and intelligent. Instead, Xu Yi is in love with Li Bala, a bar waitress. Driven to distraction, Xu neglects his homework, which infuriates his mother to the point that she was hospitalized and eventually died.

What Xu Yi and Li Bala does not know is that they are all pawns in a plan devised by Zhang Yang, Xu Yi's half-brother. Zhang Yang has always hated his mother for leaving him and his father and marrying Xu Yi's father. He wants to seek revenge against Xu Yi. One night, after seeing Zhang Yang in a basketball game, Li Bala falls in love with first sight with him. Disregarding Zhang Yang's offhand violence and his jealous and spoilt girlfriend, Jiang Jiao, Li Bala chases after him fervently. Zhang Yang agrees to date Li Bala, on the condition that Li Bala destroys Xu Yi's reputation.

After the exams, Zhang Yang and Jiang Jiao go out for dinner with their high school friends. After seeing Li Bala's name on Zhang Yang's phone, Jiang Jiao forces Zhang Yang to make a choice between her and Li Bala. Zhang Yang calls Li Bala a slut to appease Jiang Jiao, but the moment is caught on Jiang Jiao's camcorder, which is later stolen by Hei Ren's subordinate. Hei Ren, a gangster who is in love with Li Bala, assumes that Zhang Yang is playing with her feelings, and shows the video tape to Li Bala. Unable to accept the fact, Li Bala heads to find Zhang Yang to clarify the misunderstanding. However, she dies in a car accident along the way. As she is dying, Li Bala whispers her last words into Li'er's ears, telling her to pass it on to Zhang Yang. However, because of her condition, Li Er is unable to hear what Li Bala says.

After graduation, Zhang Yang and Jiang Jiao head to Beijing while Li Er and Xu Yi go to Shanghai. Li Er and Xu Yi start to date, but soon break up after Li Er finds out that Xu Yi is cheating on her. Li Er heads back to her hometown, where she chances upon Zhang Yang, whom she eventually forgives. She chances upon a note left by Li Bala, who wrote that she wanted Zhang Yang to be happy. Li Er decides to pass on the note to Zhang Yang, telling him that it is Li Bala's last words for him.

In the year 2013, everyone has graduated. Li Er is employed into a company in Shanghai. Zhang Yang, who has gradually fallen in love with Li Er, whispers gently into her ears as Li Er meets his eyes and smiles.

== Cast ==
- Chen Duling as Li Er
- Ou Hao as Zhang Yang
- Yang Yang as Xu Yi
- Ma Sichun as Li Bala
- Duan Bowen as Heiren
- Hu Xia as You Ta
- Guan Xiaotong as Jiang Jiao
- Bao Wenjing
- Jiang Wenli
- Chen Taishen
- Xie Na

== Soundtrack ==
- The Left Ear
  - Composer: Wang Zongxian
  - Lyricist: Lin Xi
  - Performer: Zhao Wei
- Rest Assured to Fly
  - Performer: Ou Hao, Yang Yang, Hu Xia
- A Beautiful Yesterday
  - Performer: Hu Xia

== Reception ==
=== Box office ===
It opened Friday, April 24, 2015 in China, earning $31.49 million, coming first place at the Chinese box office and third place worldwide, behind Avengers: Age of Ultron and Furious 7. In its second weekend, it earned $15.57 million and fell to No. 3 behind Furious 7 and You Are My Sunshine. In its third weekend, the film grossed $4.36 million for a No. 4 finish behind Chappie, Furious 7, and You Are My Sunshine.

=== Critical reviews ===
Variety said the film succeeded in immersing audience in the characters, and praised the actors' heartfelt performances, in particularly Sandra Ma.

== Awards and nominations ==
Year	Award	Category	Recipient	Result	Ref.
2015	52nd Golden Horse Awards	Best New Director	Alec Su	Nominated	
2015	52nd Golden Horse Awards	Best Supporting Actress	Sandra Ma	Nominated	
2015	5th Beijing International Film Festival	Best Youth Literature IP of the Year	The Left Ear	Won	
2016	8th Macau International Movie Festival	Most Potential Actress	Guan Xiaotong	Won	
2016	18th Huading Awards	Best New Actor	Yang Yang	Nominated	
2016	23rd Beijing College Student Film Festival	Most Popular Director	Alec Su	Won	
2016	18th Taipei Film Festival	Best Cinematography	Zhao Fei	Won	
2016	20th Huading Awards	Top 50 movies	The Left Ear (Rank 18)	Won	
2016	16th Chinese Film Media Awards	Most Anticipated Actor	Ou Hao	Won	

== See also ==
- Secret Fruit (2017)
