= Dōse Mō Nigerarenai =

Japanese manga series

どうせもう逃げられない
- Genre: Romance
- Manga
- Written by: Kazumi Kazui
- Published by: Shogakukan
- Magazine: Petit Comic
- Original run: July 8, 2011 – September 10, 2015
- Volumes: 10
- Television drama
- Directed by: Yō Kawahara
- Written by: Yō Kawahara; Yuna Suzuki
- Original network: MBS, tvk, CTC, TVS, GYT, GTV
- Original run: September 16, 2021 – finished

Dōse Mō Nigerarenai (どうせもう逃げられない; "Anyway, I Won't Run Away") is a Japanese romance josei manga series written and illustrated by Kazumi Kazui. It is published by Shogakukan, with serialization on the Petit Comic manga magazine from July 8, 2011, to September 10, 2015, and is completed in ten volumes. It is published in French by Soleil. A live-action television drama series adaptation premiered in September 2021.

== Characters ==
Naho Nodakura (野田蔵なほ, Nodakura Naho)
Portrayed by: Mayū Yokota
Takumi Sakisaka (向坂拓己, Sakisaka Takumi)
Portrayed by: Jin Shirasu
Kaoru Fukasawa (深澤馨, Fukasawa Kaoru)
Portrayed by: Kōdai Asaka
Takehiko Amari (余雄彦, Amari Takehiko)
Portrayed by: Takuya Kusakawa
Sayaka Urae (浦江沙耶香, Urae Sayaka)
Portrayed by: Nicole Ishida

== Media ==
=== Manga ===
==== Volumes ====
- 1 (February 10, 2012)
- 2 (June 8, 2012)
- 3 (November 9, 2012)
- 4 (April 10, 2013)
- 5 (August 9, 2013)
- 6 (February 10, 2014)
- 7 (September 10, 2014)
- 8 (January 9, 2015)
- 9 (April 10, 2015)
- 10 (September 10, 2015)

=== Drama ===
On August 2, 2021, MBS announced that it will produce a live-action television series adaptation. The series premiered on September 16, 2021, and is directed by Yō Kawahara, who is also writing scripts alongside Yuna Suzuki.

== Reception ==
Volume 3 reached the 39th place on the weekly Oricon manga charts and, as of November 18, 2012, had sold 36,676 copies; volume 4 reached the 24th place and, as of April 13, 2013, had sold 30,193 copies; volume 6 reached the 7th place and, as of February 16, 2014, had sold 37,540 copies; volume 7 reached the 26th place and, as of September 14, 2014, had sold 31,763 copies; volume 8 reached the 43rd place and, as of January 18, 2015, had sold 39,151 copies; volume 9 reached the 42nd place and, as of April 19, 2015, had sold 37,906 copies.
