= The Japanization of Modernity =

The Japanization of Modernity: Murakami Haruki Between Japan and the United States is a non-fiction book by Rebecca Suter, published in 2008 by Harvard University Press.

It discusses Haruki Murakami and how he navigates the culture of Japan and the culture of the United States as an author. Hijiya-Kirschnereit states that this gives the work originality. It was the fourth book published in English to examine the author in depth. The author chose to give more attention to the short stories because they were more obscure in Western countries and do not have as many translations.

Reiko Tachibana of Pennsylvania State University stated that "is not heavily theoretically oriented and it relies on Murakami's critics".

== Contents ==
There are five chapters. The last three have discussions on Murakami's fiction.

The concept of modernity is discussed in the first chapter, "The Japanization of Modernity."

The viewpoints about Murakami in Japan and the United States are discussed in the second chapter.

The third chapter discusses how Murakami uses language in his works to connect to different regions worldwide.

== Reception ==
Irmela Hijiya-Kirschnereit of Free University of Berlin stated that the author deserves credit for writing about a new concept related to Murakami.

Tachibana stated that overall she appreciated how the work "sheds new light on the works of" the author. Tachibana stated that the author's arguments could have been improved if they had more emphasis on the novels, although she did appreciate the content on the short stories. She added that the book had some " inevitable minor errors".

Timothy J. van Compernolle of Amherst College described the work overall as thoughtful, and the chapter on his role between Japan and the United States as "richly documented". Van Compernolle argued that the book does not have much of a focus on Murakami's translations of works from the United States, and he feels that the work is more about Murakami's arguments about what fiction in Japan should be.
