= The Shian Kian Weekly Review =

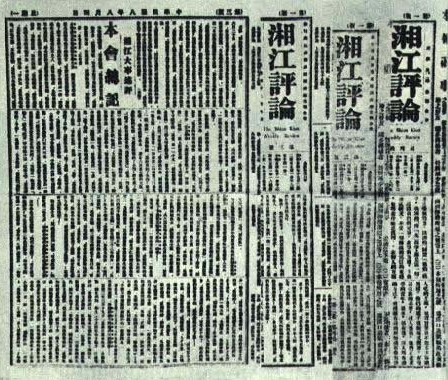
The Shian Kian Weekly Review

The Shian Kian Weekly Review (simplified Chinese: 湘江评论; traditional Chinese: 湘江評論; pinyin: Xiāngjiāng pínglùn) as known as Xiangjiang Review, was a weekly review founded by the young Mao Zedong in Changsha, Hunan, on June 14, 1919. It was written in the Changsha dialect. Xiangjiang Review was one of the earliest Communist publications in China.

Most articles in The Shian Kian Weekly Review was written by Mao himself. In mid-August 1919, it was banned by Zhang Jingyao, the governor of Hunan province. It was only published 5 times.

== Cultural references ==
The movie 1921, which deals with the founding members of the CCP, highlight's Mao's role in founding the review.
