= Legend of Awakening =

2020 Chinese TV series

- promotional poster
- 天醒之路
- Genre: Wuxia; Fantasy
- Based on: Tian Xing Zhi Lu by Hudie Lan
- Written by: Li Changling
- Directed by: Vicky Wong
- Starring: Chen Feiyu; Xiong Ziqi; Cheng Xiao; Deng Enxi; Yu Yijie; Shang Xuan
- Country of origin: China
- Original language: Mandarin
- No. of episodes: 48

Production
- Executive producer: Gordon Chan
- Production locations: Xinjiang; Yinchuan; Hengdian World Studios
- Running time: ≈45 minutes per episode
- Production companies: Youku; Tenray Media; Liubai Entertainment

Legend of Awakening (天醒之路) is a 2020 Chinese wuxia-fantasy television series based on the novel of the same name by Hudie Lan, starring Chen Feiyu, Xiong Ziqi, Deng Enxi, and Cheng Xiao. It started airing on IQIYI and Mango TV on April 23. It is available on iQIYI with multi-language subtitles (English, Thai, Bahasa Malaysia, Vietnamese, Indonesian, Spanish)

== Synopsis ==
During the Five Dynasties and Ten Kingdoms period, the people were ravaged by beasts, so they began cultivating them for self-protection. Four young heroes begin on a journey towards awakening.

== Cast ==
- Chen Feiyu as Lu Ping
- Xiong Ziqi as Yan Xifan
- Cheng Xiao as Qin Sang
- Deng Enxi as Su Tang
- Yu Yijie as Mo Lin

== Production ==
The drama was filmed from August 2018 to January 2019 at Xinjiang, Yinchuan, and the Hengdian World Studios.

The drama is directed by Vicky Wong, with Gordon Chan serving as the executive producer. Gao Bin (Brotherhood of Blades) is in charge of the styling and costumes for the drama.
