= Goodbye Mr. Loser =

- Film poster
- Chinese: 夏洛特烦恼
- Hanyu Pinyin: Xià Luò Tè Fánnǎo
- Directed by: Yan Fei; Peng Damo
- Written by: Yan Fei; Peng Damo
- Produced by: Tian Tian; Cary Cheng Kim-Fung
- Starring: Shen Teng; Ma Li; Yin Zheng; Wang Zhi; Ai Lun; Tian Yu; Song Yang; Chang Yuan; Li Ping
- Cinematography: Sun Ming
- Edited by: Zhou Xiaolin
- Music by: Dong Dongdong
- Production companies: Happy Mahua Pictures; New Classics Pictures; Tencent Video; Wanda Media
- Distributed by: Wuzhou Film Distribution; New Classic Media Corporation
- Release date: 30 September 2015 (China)
- Running time: 104 minutes
- Country: China
- Language: Mandarin
- Box office: US$228.5 million

Goodbye Mr. Loser (Chinese: 夏洛特烦恼; pinyin: Xià Luò Tè Fánnǎo) is a 2015 Chinese comedy film directed by Yan Fei and Peng Damo, and starring Shen Teng, Ma Li, Yin Zheng, Wang Zhi, Ai Lun, Tian Yu, Song Yang, Chang Yuan and Li Ping. The film is based on a play of the same name. It was released on 30 September 2015. Starring a cast of largely non-film comedians, the film became an enormous sleeper hit in China and was fueled by explosive word of mouth.

The film contains many references to Chinese popular culture in the late 1990s and early 2000s, including cameo appearances and depictions of well-known pop stars of that era. Some celebrities appear as themselves (including Jay Chou as a talent show contestant on The Voice, who performed a song Xia Luo had allegedly written, in reality one that Xia Luo had plagiarized from him), whilst others are depicted through stand-ins (for instance, Miss Na, who talent-spots Xia Luo in the new 1997 timeline).

== Plot ==
Unemployed amateur musician Xia Luo attends the wedding of Qiu Ya, his high school crush. He overdrinks, makes an inebriated declaration of love to Qiu Ya, and angers his wife, Ma Dongmei, who publicly shames him for being a poor provider and husband.

After causing chaos as his wife pursues him through the wedding hall, Xia Luo locks himself in a bathroom at the wedding venue, flies into a rage of self-hatred and passes out, waking up in his teenage body in his middle-school classroom in 1997. Thinking he is in a dream, he impulsively beats up his condescending teacher, sets fire to the classroom, and kisses Qiu Ya, then jumps out a window to end the dream. After waking up in hospital and realising he is still in 1997, Xia Luo is forced to make the best of things.

Although Xia Luo appears as his normal teenage self to everyone else in 1997, he retains all his memories of adult life, including around twenty years of as yet unwritten pop music, which he decides to present as his own work to gain fame and to win the heart of Qiu Ya. Over the next twenty years, he becomes a pop megastar in China, taking the place of other superstar singers from the original 1990s to 2000s timeline, including ghostwriting famous television themes for pop radio, duetting with Sarah Brightman at the 2008 Beijing Olympic opening ceremony in place of Liu Huan and producing and judging for a popular music talent television series (based on The Voice).

Having achieved his ambitions, including marrying Qiu Ya, Xia Luo gradually realizes that he was destined to be with Ma Dongmei. After he abandoned her in middle school in the new timeline, she nevertheless defended him from bullies and troublemakers and was forced into a simple life in a small apartment, eventually marrying Da Chun, one of Xia Luo's kindly but slow-witted classmates from 1997.

As time goes on, Xia Luo gradually runs out of songs from his original time to claim as his own, and his own written songs are criticized as lacking talent. He eventually announces his retirement and starts wasting his money on drugs and women. He also discovers Qiu Ya having an affair with another friend. Disappointed with how his life is turning out, Xia Luo makes a proposal to Da Chun, offering to trade all he owns in exchange for his wife, but the frustrated husband punches him unconscious, and he wakes up in a hospital bed, where it is discovered he is dying from AIDS. As Xia Luo's health deteriorates, Ma Dongmei sings a final love song to him in his hospital bed, revealing that it was always her favourite, even though he was serenading Qiu Ya with it in the classroom at the time (this song is also the only song Xia Luo truly wrote himself).

At the moment of his death, Xia Luo awakes and finds himself back in the wedding venue bathroom, where he realizes that Ma Dongmei is the true love of his life. He runs back into the room and embraces her, and continues to do so as they are both arrested and taken to the local police station. He resumes his normal life much as before, but with a new devotion to Ma Dongmei.

== Cast ==
- Shen Teng as Xia Luo
- Ma Li as Ma Dongmei
- Yin Zheng as Yuan Hua
- Wang Zhi as Qiu Ya
- Ai Lun as Chun (Da Chun)
- Tian Yu as Mr. Wang (Wang Laoshi)
- Song Yang as Zhang Yang
- Chang Yuan as Meng Te
- Li Ping as Xia Luo's Mom (Xia Luo Ma)
- Lee Li-chun as Principal (Xiaozhang)
- Zhang Yiming
- Yi Bo
- Zhou Hua-an

== Reception ==
=== Box office ===
A massive sleeper hit in China, the film has grossed US$226.6 million in China. Combined with an overseas box office of US$1.9 million, the film has grossed in total US$228.5 million worldwide as of November 2015.
