= Temporary Family =

2014 Hong Kong film by Cheuk Wan-chi

- Film poster
- Directed by: Cheuk Wan-chi
- Written by: Cheuk Wan-chi
- Produced by: William Kong; Nansun Shi; Winnie Yu; Ivy Ho
- Starring: Nick Cheung; Sammi Cheng; Angelababy; Oho Ou
- Cinematography: Charlie Lam
- Edited by: Eric Kwong
- Music by: Alan Wong; Janet Yung
- Production company: Edko Films
- Release date: 21 August 2014
- Running time: 109 minutes
- Country: Hong Kong
- Language: Cantonese
- Box office: US$18,936,753

Temporary Family (失戀急讓) is a 2014 Hong Kong comedy film directed and written by Cheuk Wan-chi.

== Plot ==
Hong Siu Long proposes to his girlfriend, but is rebuffed, and given an ultimatum that means he must double his fortune in one year or break up. As he contemplates as to how to do this Hong, a realtor, is engaged by a client wanting a quick sale of a luxury apartment, and willing to accept a below market price bid. Together with Charlotte, a would be client who just happened to be in the office, his colleague Very Wong, and his step-daughter Lui Yuen Ping, Hong decides to buy the apartment as a speculative venture. The four combine their assets for the deposit and given the ever rising property prices expect to quickly sell the apartment for a profit.

However, to their dismay, just as they complete the purchase, the Hong Kong government introduces measures to slow the property bubble, especially measures to prevent speculation by wealthy mainland Chinese seeking to move their capital offshore. What seemed like a surefire bet has now become a white elephant, and the four are stretched to keep up the mortgage repayments. To cut costs all four move in together becoming a temporary family.

In their attempts to sell the apartment the four become closer and come to care for each other. Becoming more than just unwilling housemates, Charlotte prevents Lui from prostituting herself, and when it is revealed that the apartment was the marital home of Charlotte and her ex-husband, Lui votes alongside Charlotte to prevent the sale of the apartment and saves Charlotte from being humiliated by her ex-husbands new girlfriend; all rally around Hong when he is made redundant and dumped by his girlfriend.

With their cash reserve eaten away by mortgage repayments, and the bank on the verge of foreclosing the four have one last chance to sell the apartment for a profit and not lose everything.

== Cast ==
- Nick Cheung as Hong Siu Long (項少龍)

Realtor, has given up his principles to get ahead in the Hong Kong realty business

- Sammi Cheng as Charlotte Fung (馮沙律)

Divorcee, who has only ever been a homemaker

- Angelababy as Lui Yuen Ping (呂婉娉)

Courier, Hong Siu Long's stepdaughter

- Oho Ou as Very Wong (黃初)

Realtor, Hong Siu Long's protege, son of a wealthy father wanting to make his own way in the world

- Dayo Wong as Tsui Chi Chung (徐子聰)

Charlotte's ex-husband, Yeung Lin's boyfriend

- Jiang Wu as Mr. Shek (石先生)

Mainland Chinese tycoon

- Myolie Wu as Cheung Yee (蔣儀)

Air hostess, Hong Siu Long's girlfriend

- Sui He as Yeung Lin (楊蓮)

Daughter of a wealthy gallery owner, Tsui Chi Chung's meal ticket

=== Cameo appearances ===
- Jacky Cheung as George (佐治)

Solicitor

- Ivana Wong as Mrs. Chan

"Friend" of Charlotte and her husband, Charlotte's social rival

- Fruit Chan as neighborhood tyrant
- Regina Ip Lau Suk-yee, as Ip Lau Suk Chi (葉劉淑之)

Hong Kong Mid-levels District Councillor

- Eric Kot as gynecologist
- Yu Menglong

== Reception ==
It has grossed HK$16,535,069 in Hong Kong and ¥100,436,001 in China.
