= A Gilded Game =

2025 film directed by Herman Yau

- Theatrical release poster
- Traditional Chinese: 獵金遊戲
- Simplified Chinese: 猎金游戏
- Literal meaning: Hunting Gold, the Game
- Hanyu Pinyin: Liè jīn yóuxì
- Directed by: Herman Yau
- Screenplay by: Herman Yau; Zhao Wenliang; Carol Ko
- Produced by: Andy Lau; Alvin Lam; Calvin Choi
- Starring: Andy Lau; Ou Hao; Huang Yi; Jiang Mengjie; Kent Cheng; Jasper Liu; Ni Ni
- Cinematography: Joe Chan
- Edited by: Lam Wing-lui
- Music by: Mak Chun Hung
- Production companies: Universe Entertainment; Tianjin Maoyan Weiying Culture Media; Yinming Culture; AMTD Digital; Focus Films Limited
- Distributed by: Universe Films Distribution
- Release dates: May 1, 2025 (China); May 8, 2025 (Hong Kong)
- Running time: 129 minutes
- Countries: Hong Kong; China
- Languages: Mandarin; English
- Budget: ¥150–200 million
- Box office: US$37.3 million

A Gilded Game (simplified Chinese: 猎金游戏; traditional Chinese: 獵金遊戲; pinyin: Liè jīn yóuxì) is a 2025 crime drama film directed and co-written by Herman Yau, and starring Andy Lau, Ou Hao, Huang Yi, Jiang Mengjie, Kent Cheng, Jasper Liu, and Ni Ni. A Hong Kong-Chinese co-production, the film follows new hire Gao Han as he becomes the apprentice of financial markets expert Todd Cheung and tackles a high-stakes IPO amid fierce competition.

A Gilded Game was released in China on May 1, 2025, and in Hong Kong on May 8. It received mixed reviews from critics.

== Plot ==
Finance prodigy Gao Han lands an internship at a top international investment bank, Bluestone, and is assigned to be the assistant of Todd Cheung. At first, Todd does not think highly of him, but Gao Han gradually earns his trust through his sharp mind.

Meanwhile, Gao Han's performance also draws the attention of Bluestone's senior executive, Helen Lee. Helen invites him to lunch and asks him to deceive Todd into signing documents that approve falsified accounts. To secure a promotion, Gao Han reluctantly complies.

He believes this will lead to a bright future, but soon discovers he has been used in a scheme to acquire Zhuoneng, the company of his close friend Chu Feng. This also indirectly causes the death of Chu Feng's father, Chu Zhihong. At the same time, Helen sows discord between Gao Han and his girlfriend Xu Xiaohui, leaving him devastated. In despair, Gao Han plans to jump off a building, but first begs Todd to help save Zhuoneng.

Todd agrees. Together, they help Chu Feng manipulate the market to force Helen and Bluestone into rushing to buy Zhuoneng shares to secure control. After the stock hits its upper limit, they immediately announce that Chu Feng is forming a new company and transferring Zhuoneng's core technical staff. This tanks Zhuoneng's stock price and causes losses for Bluestone.

Afterward, the three of them go to the Securities and Futures Commission to confess and expose the insider trading scheme orchestrated by Helen and Mike to take over Zhuoneng. In the end, all involved receive the punishment they deserve.

== Cast ==
- Andy Lau as Todd Cheung
- Ou Hao as Gao Han
- Ni Ni as Anna
- Huang Yi as Helen Lee
- Jiang Mengjie as Xu Xiaohui
- Kent Cheng as Mike
- Jasper Liu as Chu Feng
- Chang Chen-kuang as Chu Zhihong
- Lily Tien as Ma Na

== Production ==
According to reports on June 13, 2022, the film titled Wall Street of the East, directed and written by Herman Yau, starring Andy Lau, Ou Hao, and others, was officially announced to begin production at the same time. Filming started on October 21 of the same year and wrapped on November 24.

When it was scheduled for release in mainland China in 2025, the film's literal title was changed to Hunting Gold, the Game.
