= My Girl and I =

- Theatrical release poster
- Hangul: 파랑주의보
- Hanja: 파랑注意報
- RR: Parang juuibo
- MR: P'arang chuŭibo
- Directed by: Jeon Yun-su
- Written by: Kwak Jae-yong; Hwang Seong-gu
- Produced by: Jeon Hoon-tak; Um Joo-yeong
- Starring: Cha Tae-hyun; Song Hye-kyo
- Cinematography: Park Hee-ju
- Edited by: Park Gok-ji
- Music by: Lee Dong-june
- Distributed by: iLove Cinema
- Release date: 23 December 2005
- Running time: 95 minutes
- Country: South Korea
- Language: Korean
- Box office: US$2.3 million

My Girl and I (Korean: 파랑주의보; lit. 'A Heavy Seas Warning') is a 2005 South Korean romantic drama film directed by Jeon Yun-su. It is a remake of the Japanese film Crying Out Love, In the Center of the World, adapted from the novel Socrates in Love by Kyoichi Katayama.

== Plot ==
The film starts in modern-day Korea, where Kim Su-ho (Cha Tae-hyun) returns to his hometown after ten years to attend a reunion with high school friends. As he walks he hears a female voice in his head calling out his name. Su-ho's friends doubt that he will attend the reunion, as he hasn't yet got over a girl. They say that day of their reunion is the anniversary of the death of a girl named Bae Su-eun (Song Hye-kyo). To everyone's surprise, Su-ho arrives, and after celebrating, they go to a lighthouse where Su-ho's friend upsets him by referring to Bae Su-eun, and he starts to cry. In a flashback, a younger Su-ho is rescued from drowning by a pretty girl. She loses her pager in the process of rescuing him but leaves. Su-ho then wakes up and thinks his friends saved him from drowning.

In the next scene, Su-ho and his classmates are singing in a music class, when he notices his classmate Su-eun staring at him. His friend says she always stares at him in class, and Su-ho starts to think she might be interested in him. Su-ho and Su-eun pass each other in the hallway, and she surprises him by asking him to buy her a croquette. He says that if they ate together, people would think that they are dating. They eat together nonetheless, and the other students notice. Soon the captain of the judo club who had his eye on Su-eun finds Su-ho, and threatens him. Sun-ho immediately denies dating her. Su-eun arrives and tells the captain that they are indeed dating. The captain throws Su-ho down. Su-ho's friends arrive to rescue him and they escape by bike.

Su-ho and Su-eun stand near a lighthouse. Su-eun hints to Su-ho that she saved him but he doesn't understand. They watch the sunset together. Su-ho walks Su-eun home and she gives him her number. Although her beeper was lost, she can still receive and leave messages. That night, they confess their feelings for each other.

The next day, Su-ho is called out of class because his grandfather has collapsed. He quickly goes to his grandfather's but finds him well. It turns out he feigned illness to talk to Su-ho. Su-eun arrives with Su-ho's bag. Su-ho's grandfather shares his story. When he was young, Su-ho's grandfather joined the army. He was separated from his first love, Soon-im. He left her a necklace to remember him by. Years passed and he became an undertaker. He prepared a funeral for Soon-im's husband. They could not even say a word to each other and soon he married another woman, Su-ho's grandmother.

This story makes Su-ho realize that he loves Su-eun and wants to be with her. He leaves a message for Su-eun expressing his feelings, unaware that she is behind him until she replies, "Me too." From that day on, Su-ho and Su-eun are officially a couple. Su-ho's friends propose an overnight stay on Fog Island. As Su-ho and Su-eun arrive together at the pier, he finds out that his friends tricked him so he and Su-eun would have some time alone. On the island their love deepens, and they share their first kiss. The next day, Su-eun faints. Su-ho rushes her to the hospital, visiting her every day. She turns out to be suffering from terminal leukemia. Her last wish is to return to their island.

Soon-im also had a last wish before she died: to be reunited with Su-ho's grandfather. He prepared her funeral and was reunited with his first love, who he had loved for 50 years. While Su-ho is visiting the hospital Su-eun expresses her wish, and he shows her two ferry tickets. However, a typhoon prevents the ferries from running. Su-ho desperately pleads with the authorities to let them travel. While they argue, Su-eun collapses.

In the present, Su-ho returns to Fog Island and finds Su-eun's bag. Her diary entry reveals that she had planted seeds on the hill during their visit. The flowers will be her gift to him. Su-ho goes to the hill, finding it covered with purple flowers.

== Cast ==
- Song Hye-kyo as Bae Su-eun
- Cha Tae-hyun as Kim Su-ho
- Kim Hae-sook as Su-ho's mother
- Lee Soon-jae as Kim Man-geum, Su-ho's grandfather
- Song Chang-eui as Park Jong-goo, Su-ho's friend
- Park Hyo-jun as Oh Sung-jin, Su-ho's friend
- Kim Young-joon as Kim Hye-sung, Su-ho's friend
- Kim Shin-young as Su-ho's sister
- Moon Won-joo as Young-goo, judo captain
- Han Myeong-ku as Su-eun's father
- Moon Jeong-hee as Soon-im / Soon-im's daughter
- Yoon Hee-won as young Kim Man-geum
