= Deng Enxi =

Chinese actress

- Born: April 18, 2005 (age 21); Chongqing, China
- Other name: Ancy
- Occupation: Actress
- Years active: 2017–present
- Agent: TF Entertainment
- Height: 162 cm (5 ft 4 in)

Chinese name
- Simplified Chinese: 邓恩熙
Transcriptions

Deng Enxi (Chinese: 邓恩熙, born 18 April 2005) is a Chinese actress.

== Career ==
In 2017, Deng made her acting debut in the suspense thriller film The Devotion of Suspect X, based on the novel of the same name by Keigo Higashino. The same year, she played her first leading role in the drama film Summer is the Coldest Season.

In 2018, Deng starred in the comedy drama film A Cool Fish, receiving positive reviews for her performance as a rebellious girl. She also starred in the romance film Last Letter, portraying two different characters. The same year, she was cast in the fantasy adventure drama Legend of Awakening.

In 2019, Deng starred in the youth sports drama Never Stand Still: Skate Our Souls as a skateboarding player.

In 2020, Deng starred in the detective comedy drama Detective Chinatown, and fantasy wuxia drama Legend of Awakening.

== Filmography ==
=== Film ===
| Year | English title | Chinese title | Role | Notes/Ref. |
|---|---|---|---|---|
| 2017 | The Devotion of Suspect X | 嫌疑人X的献身 | Chen Xiaoxin | |
| 2018 | A Cool Fish | 无名之辈 | Ma Yiyi | |
| 2018 | Last Letter | 你好，之华 | Yuan Zhinan / Yuan Mumu | |
| 2020 | Mammoth | 会考试的猛犸象 | Zhao An'an | |
| 2020 | Back to the Wharf | 风平浪静 | Wan Xiaoning | |
| 2020 | Summer is the Coldest Season | 少女佳禾 | Li Jiahe | |
| 2021 | Hi Brothers | 二哥来了怎么办 | Yang Tingyu | |
| 2021 | Be Somebody | 扬名立万 | Ye Ying | |
| 2025 | LUZ | 花明渡 | Chen Fa | |
| 2026 | Game of Identity | 天才游戏 | Qiqi | |

=== Television series ===
| Year | English title | Chinese title | Role | Network | Notes/Ref. |
|---|---|---|---|---|---|
| 2017 | Boy Hood | 我们的少年时代 | Xing Shanshan | Hunan TV | |
| 2019 | Never Stand Still: Skate Our Souls | 极限S：滑魂 | Chen Ximing | Mango TV, Tencent Video | |
| 2019 | No Secrets | 没有秘密的你 | young Lin Xingran | Tencent Video | |
| 2020 | Detective Chinatown | 唐人街探案 | Xiao Ai | iQIYI | |
| 2020 | Legend of Awakening | 天醒之路 | Su Tang | Mango TV, iQIYI | |
| 2021 | Twelve Legends | 十二谭 | Xiao Yu | Youku | |
| 2021 | Flourish in Time | 我和我的时光少年 | Lu Miao | Tencent Video | |
| 2023 | Grandma's New World | 外婆的新世界 | Dou Qi | iQIYI, Jiangsu TV | |
| 2024 | Detective Chinatown 2 | 唐人街探案2 | Xiao Ai | iQIYI | |
| 2024 | Melody of Golden Age | 长乐曲 | Yan Xing | Hunan TV, Mango TV | |
| 2025 | Hunting | 围猎 | Wu Zhi'an | iQIYI, Jiangsu TV, Tencent Video | |
| 2026 | Mama Go! | 我的妈妈是校花 | Kong Guifang | Tencent Video | |
| 2026 | Eight Hundred | 方圆八百米 | Gao Songge | Tencent Video | |
| TBA | Cyrano Agency | 大鼻子情圣 | Chen Yanan | iQIYI, Tencent Video | |
| TBA | The Road to Splendor | 花开锦绣 | Fu Tingyun | Tencent Video | |
| TBA | A Love Confession | 告白 | Xu Sui | Hunan TV, Mango TV | |
| TBA | Qia Feng Chun | 恰逢春 | Yang Shanheng | Hunan TV, Mango TV | |

== Awards and nominations ==
| Year | Award | Category | Nominated work | Results | Ref. |
|---|---|---|---|---|---|
| 2019 | Golden Bud - The Fourth Network Film And Television Festival | Best Newcomer | Never Stand Still: Skate Our Souls | Nominated | |
| 2020 | Weibo Awards Ceremony | Rising Artist of the Year | —N/a | Won | |
