= Ou Hao =

Chinese actor & singer (born 1992)

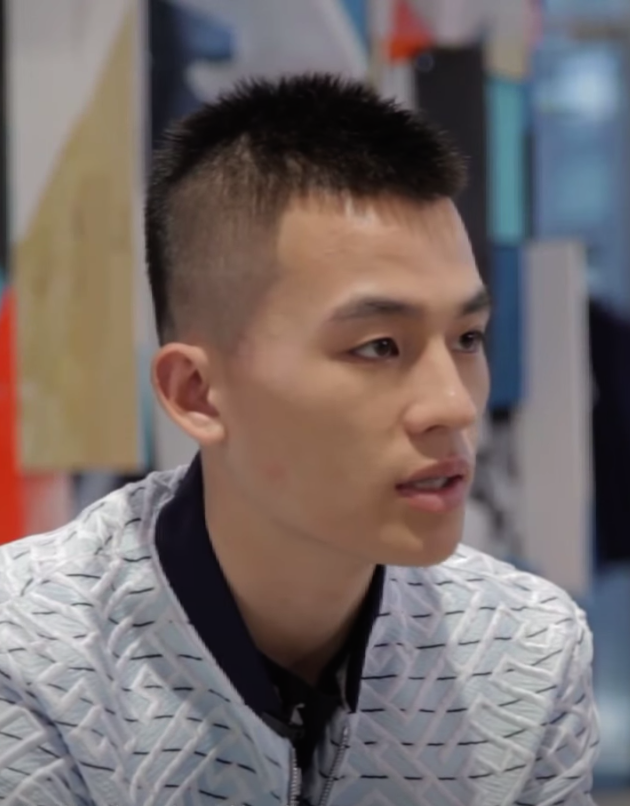
- Ou in 2015
- Born: 13 October 1992 (age 34); Pingtan County, Fuzhou
- Education: Guangzhou Art School
- Occupations: Actor; Singer
- Years active: 2012–present
- Agent: EE-Media

Chinese name
- Simplified Chinese: 欧豪
- Traditional Chinese: 歐豪
Transcriptions
Standard Mandarin
- Hanyu Pinyin: Ōu Háo

Ou Hao or Oho Ou (Chinese: 欧豪, born 13 October 1992), sometimes known as OHO, is a Chinese actor and singer. He is best known for his role as Zhang Yang in The Left Ear (2015).

== Career ==
In 2012, Ou released his first single "Fake Movement", which won him the "Outstanding Newcomer" award at the Chinese Music Awards. He made his official debut after winning 2nd place in Hunan TV's singing competition Super Boy in 2013. He won the "Most Popular Newcomer" award at the 14th Top Chinese Music Awards.

In 2014, Ou made his acting debut in Hunan TV's music drama Song of Vengeance. He also featured in the comedy film, Temporary Family as his first big screen project.

In 2015, Ou achieved recognition with his role in the youth film The Left Ear by Alec Su. He won the "Most Anticipated Actor" award at the 16th Chinese Film Media Awards for his performance. The same year, he released his first solo album On His Own and won the "Best All-Rounded Artist" and "Best Trendy Singer" awards at the KU Music Asian Music Awards.

In 2016, Ou starred in the romance film Crying Out in Love, based on the Japanese novel Socrates in Love. He also starred in the crime suspense film Blood of Youth.

In 2017, Ou co-starred in the fantasy epic film Wu Kong and coming-of-age film Fist & Faith. He also starred in the war film The Founding of an Army, playing Ye Ting. The same year, Ou featured in Chen Kaige's fantasy mystery film Legend of the Demon Cat.

In 2018, Ou starred in the fantasy action web drama Hero's Dream.

In 2019, Ou starred in the crime film Vortex, and aviation disaster film The Captain as a pilot. He also featured in disaster film The Bravest, portraying a firefighter; nationalistic film My People, My Country, and Guan Hu's war film The Eight Hundred. On the small screen, Ou starred in romance drama Love Under the Moon alongside Victoria Song. Forbes China listed Ou under their 30 Under 30 Asia 2019 list which consisted of 30 influential people under 30 years old who have had a substantial effect in their fields.

== Filmography ==
=== Film ===
| Year | English title | Chinese title | Role | Notes/Ref. |
|---|---|---|---|---|
| 2014 | No Zuo No Die | 我就是我 | Himself | Documentary |
| 2014 | Temporary Family | 临时同居 | Huang Chu | |
| 2015 | The Left Ear | 左耳 | Zhang Yang | |
| 2016 | Crying Out in Love | 在世界中心呼喚愛 | Ke Da | |
| 2016 | Blood of Youth | 少年 | Su Ang | |
| 2017 | Fist & Faith | 青禾男高 | Jing Hao | |
| 2017 | Wu Kong | 悟空傳 | Tian Peng | |
| 2017 | The Founding of an Army | 建軍大業 | Ye Ting | |
| 2017 | Legend of the Demon Cat | 妖貓傳 | Dan Long | |
| 2017 | Secret Fruit | 秘果 | Zhang Yang | Cameo |
| 2019 | The Bravest | 烈火英雄 | Xu Xiaobin | Cameo |
| 2019 | Vortex | 铤而走险 | Xia Xi | |
| 2019 | The Captain | 中国机长 | Xu Yichen | |
| 2019 | My People, My Country | 我和我的祖国 | Liang Changshou | |
| 2020 | The Eight Hundred | 八佰 | Duan Wu | |
| 2020 | The Sacrifice | 金刚川 | Company Commander Qi | |
| 2021 | 1921 | | Li Qihan | |
| 2021 | Chinese Doctors | 中国医生 | Jin Zigang | |
| 2021 | The Battle At Lake Changjin | 长津湖 | Yang Gensi | |
| 2021 | My Country, My Parents | 我和我的父辈 | Xiao Ma | |
| 2023 | Full River Red | 满江红 | Zheng Wan | |
| 2023 | Raid on the Lethal Zone | 绝地追击 | Wang Jinhao | |
| 2024 | Formed Police Unit | 维和防暴队 | Zhou Jiaxuan | |
| 2024 | Three Old Boys | 三叉戟 | Geng Xiaoqing | |
| 2024 | The Volunteers: The Battle of Life and Death | 志愿军：存亡之战 | Zhang Xiaoheng | |
| 2025 | A Gilded Game | 猎金游戏 | Gao Han | |
| 2025 | Love List | 分手清单 | Ma Tianze | |
| 2025 | Family at Large | 三滴血 | Dao Yu | |

=== Television series ===
| Year | English title | Chinese title | Role | Ref. |
|---|---|---|---|---|
| 2014 | Song of Vengeance | 唱战记 | Zi Ye | |
| 2018 | Hero's Dream | 天意之秦天宝鉴 | Han Xin | |
| 2019 | Love Under the Moon | 山月不知心底事 | Ye Qianze | |
| 2020 | The Eight | 民初奇人传 | Hua Minchu | |
| 2020 | The Penalty Zone | 黑白禁区 | Gan Tianlei | |
| 2021 | My Dear Guardian | 爱上特种兵 | Luo Liang | |
| 2021 | Lover or Stranger | 陌生的恋人 | Huo Youze | |
| 2022 | To Our Dreamland of Ice | 冰雪之名 | Yan Yang | |
| 2022 | The Fight | 对决 | Wu Jian | |
| 2022 | Nobody Knows | 胆小鬼 | Qin Li | |
| 2022 | Wild Bloom | 野蛮生长 | Tong Xiaoqi | |
| 2023 | The Eve | 前夜 | Lin Xi | |
| 2024 | Tell No One | 不可告人 | Gao Yang | |
| 2024 | The Limbo | 二十一天 | He Xiaoguang | |
| 2024 | Battle of Shangganling | 上甘岭 | Huang Jiguang | |
| 2025 | Northward | 北上 | Xie Wanghe | |
| 2025 | Into the Heat | 刑警的日子 | Liu Ziming | |
| 2025 | The Perfect Suspect | 完美的救赎 | Zhong Ning | |
| 2025 | Rose Finch | 朱雀堂 | Wen Yuting | |
| 2025 | This Thriving Land | 生万物 | Feng Dajiao | |
| 2025 | The Miracles | 奇迹 | Jun Sheng | |
| 2026 | Wind-Born Warriors | 兵自风中来 | Guo Zijian | |
| 2026 | Awaken | 醒来 | Chen Kailai | |
| 2026 | The Long Watch | 交锋 | Lin Kanshan | |
| TBA | The Way You Come Back | 玉兰花开君再来 | Xia Zhishi | |
| TBA | Fan Jian Wu Sheng | 反间无声 | Liang Jin | |

=== Variety show ===
| Year | English title | Chinese title | Role | Ref. |
|---|---|---|---|---|
| 2015 | Takes a Real Man | 真正男子漢 | Cast member | |
| 2015 | Top Fly | 壮志凌云 | Cast member | |
| 2021 | Dunk of China Season 4 | 这！就是灌篮 4 | Team Manager | |

== Discography ==
=== Albums ===
| Year | English title | Chinese title | Notes |
|---|---|---|---|
| 2015 | On His Own | —N/a | |

=== Singles ===
| Year | English title | Chinese title | Notes |
|---|---|---|---|
| 2012 | "Fake Movement" | 假动作 | |
| 2012 | "Left Right" | 左右 | |
| 2012 | "Coming Closer" | 靠近 | |
| 2013 | "Only I'm Not Happy" | 只有我不快乐 | |

=== Promotional tracks ===
| Year | English title | Chinese title | Album | Notes/Ref. |
|---|---|---|---|---|
| 2013 | "Hey Brothers" | 嘿,哥们儿 | —N/a | Promotional song for Lenovo Mobile with Super Boy contestants |
| 2013 | "Chasing dream with a Child-like Heart" | 追梦赤子心 | —N/a | Theme song of Super Boy with Top 10 contestants |
| 2013 | "Every Star" | 每一颗星辰 | No Zuo No Die OST | with Top 12 Contestants |
| 2013 | "Beautiful Light" | | —N/a | Promotional song for Toyota Yaris L |
| 2014 | "Love is the Greatest" | 爱最大 | As the Light Goes Out OST | Mandarin version |
| 2014 | "Song of Vengeance" | 唱戰記 | Song of Vengeance OST | with Yida Huang |
| 2014 | "Difference" | 偏差 | Song of Vengeance OST | |
| 2014 | "The Wind of Happiness" | 幸福的风 | Song of Vengeance OST | with Wu Mengqi |
| 2014 | "Actually I Don't Want to Go" | 其实不想走 | Song of Vengeance OST | |
| 2014 | "Together" | 在一起 | Temporary Family OST | |
| 2015 | "Rest Assured to Fly" | 放心去飞 | The Left Ear OST | with Yang Yang & Hu Xia |
| 2015 | "Irreplaceable" | 无可替代 | —N/a | Promotional song for QQ Xuan Wu |
| 2016 | "My Music is the Coolest" | 我的音乐最酷 | —N/a | Theme song of 2016 KU Music Asian Music Awards |
| 2016 | "I Love Summer" | 我爱夏天 | Crying Out in Love OST | |
| 2016 | "What More Could I Ask For in Life" | 一生何求 | Blood of Youth OST | |
| 2017 | "For My 17-year-old Self" | 给17岁的自己 | Secret Fruit OST | with various artists |
| 2017 | "Fang Ma Guo Lai" | 放马过来 | Fist & Faith OST | |
| 2019 | "Practice To Be Friends" | 練習當朋友 | Love Under the Moon OST | with Victoria Song |
| 2019 | "My Motherland and I" | 我和我的祖国 | My People My Country OST | with Chen Feiyu, Liu Haoran, Zhou Dongyu & Zhu Yilong |

== Awards and nominations ==
| Year | Award | Category | Nominated work | Results | Ref. |
|---|---|---|---|---|---|
| 2012 | 4th Chinese Music Awards | Outstanding Newcomer Award | "Fake Movement" | Won | |
| 2012 | 9th Music King Global Music Award Ceremony | Best New Singer | —N/a | Won | |
| 2012 | Guangzhou New Top Ten Awards | Top Ten Songs | "Near" | Won | |
| 2014 | 14th Top Chinese Music Awards | Most Popular Newcomer | —N/a | Won | |
| 2014 | KuGou Music Awards | Best Newcomer (Mainland) | —N/a | Won | |
| 2014 | KuGou Music Awards | Popularity Award | —N/a | Won | |
| 2015 | OK! The Style Awards | Most Popular Film New Idol | —N/a | Won | |
| 2015 | Tencent Entertainment White Paper | Post 90s Star of the Year | —N/a | Won | |
| 2016 | 2nd KU Music Asian Music Awards | Best Popular All-Rounded Artist | On My Own | Won | |
| 2016 | 2nd KU Music Asian Music Awards | Best Trendy Singer | On My Own | Won | |
| 2016 | Asia Music Gala | Most Popular All-Rounded Artist | —N/a | Won | |
| 2016 | Global Music Awards | Music Award (Silver medal) | "Rims" | Won | |
| 2016 | 16th Chinese Film Media Awards | Most Anticipated Actor | The Left Ear | Won | |
| 2019 | 11th Macau International Movie Festival | Best Supporting Actor | The Bravest | Nominated | |
| 2020 | 7th The Actors of China Award Ceremony | Best Actor (Emerald) | —N/a | Nominated | |
