= Miao Boying =

Chinese socialist revolutionary

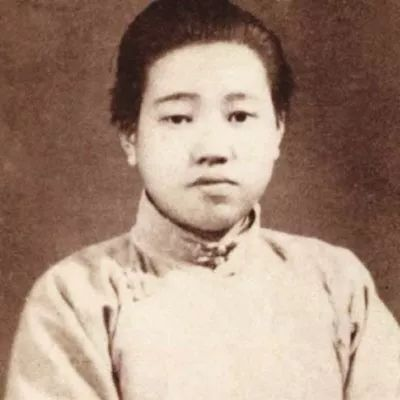
- Born: 1899; Changsha, Hunan Province, China
- Died: 1929 (aged 29–30)
- Political party: Chinese Communist Party

Miao Boying (Chinese: 缪伯英; pinyin: Miao Bóyīng) was a Chinese teacher, writer and revolutionary who became the first woman to join the Chinese Communist Party. She was a founding member of China's Woman's Rights League and later became secretary of the Hunan Communist Women's Committee.

== Life ==
Miao was born in 1899 in Changsha, Hunan Province. She went to First Girls' Normal School, passing an entrance exam allowing her to attend Beijing Normal Women's College (now known as Beijing Normal University). While here she met her future husband and Hunan native He Mengxiong who was studying at the nearby Peking University. After suspending her studies she became involved with the Work-Study Mutual Aid Corp which was set up by future Chinese Communist Party founders Deng Zhongxia and Li Dazhao to promote Marxist ideas.

In November 1920 she formally joined the newly establish Communist Youth League of China headed by Yu Xiusong and started publishing articles about the roles women play in the family. Later that month a split within the party saw some member who supported anarchism leave, to strengthen the party Miao who was the first woman to join the group, recruited five members from other CYL chapters. At the age of 21, Miao left the Communist Youth League and joined the Chinese Communist Party, again becoming its first female member.

A few years later she founded the Women's Right League and traveled across China with her husband He Mengxiong to promote the organization. In 1924 she was sent back to Hunan by party leaders to become secretary of the Hunan Communist Women's Committee. In 1929 Miao died at Paulun Hospital in Shanghai of typhoid fever.
