= Kazumi Kazui =

Japanese manga artist

Kazumi Kazui 一井 かずみ
- Born: Aichi Prefecture, Japan
- Area: Manga artist
- Notable works: Socrates in Love, Dōse Mō Nigerarenai

Kazumi Kazui (一井 かずみ, Kazui Kazumi) is a Japanese manga artist. She made her debut in 2000 in a special edition of Petit Comic with Watashi no Iru Basho (The Place Where I Am), and later worked on the manga adaptation of Socrates in Love. Her current work Dōse Mō Nigerarenai has been released in nine volumes by Shogakukan.

== Works ==
Title	Year	Notes	Refs
More More More (もっともっともっと, Motto Motto Motto) |	2003	Published for 1 volume	
Soredemo kimi o ubau (それでも君を奪う)	2004	Published for 1 volume	
Socrates in Love (Crying Out Love, in the Center of the World)	2004	Original story by Kyoichi Katayama, Art by Kazumi Kazui; Published for 1 volume	
Flower Garden (フラワーガーデン)	2005	Published for 1 volume	
Love/Job (ラブ/ジョブ)	2006	Published for 1 volume	
Yukihakanohitonoyumewomiru (雪はかの人の夢を見る)	2007	Published for 1 volume	
Kinji rareta koi ni ochite (禁じられた恋に堕ちて); Petit comic love selection	2007	Anthology work Published for 1 volume	
Ecstasy Trade (エクスタシー・トレード)	2008	Published for 1 volume	
Sa Himitsu yo Hajimeyou (ja: さあ 秘密をはじめよう, Will you start secret love with me?)	2009–11	Published for 7 volumes	
Dōse Mō Nigerarenai	2011–present	Published by Shogakukan for 9 volumes.	
VS. Mutō (VS. 無糖)	2012	Published for 1 volume	
Doesu sūtsu (ドSスーツ)	2014	Published for 1 volume	
