= Secret Fruit =

2017 film

- Movie poster
- All about secrets
- Directed by: Lien Yi-chi
- Written by: Rao Xueman
- Starring: Chen Feiyu (陈飞宇); Nana Ou-Yang (歐陽娜娜)
- Production company: Beijing Enlight Pictures
- Release date: July 7, 2017
- Running time: 99 minutes
- Country: China
- Language: Mandarin

Secret Fruit (Chinese: 秘果) is a 2017 Chinese coming-of-age romance film directed by Lien Yi-chi and starring Chen Feiyu and Nana Ou-Yang. It is based upon the novel of the same name by Rao Xueman, who also wrote the film's screenplay. The film was released in China on July 7, 2017.

== Plot ==
Seventeen-year-old Duan Bowen (Chen Feiyu) lost his mother at a young age and dislikes his stepmother. One day, he notices Li Er (Mi Mi), a new teacher at his school. Although Li Er has a disability in her left ear, she helps her students succeed. Duan Bowen falls in love with this young, kindhearted woman but keeps it a secret. He follows her and they meet several times on rainy days. Li Er is willing to listen to his troubles, and she invites him to her house. She tells Duan Bowen to talk about his difficulties in her left ear. As he leaves her house, he meets her fiancé, a man named Zhang Yang (Oho Ou).

Little does he know that his childhood playmate Yu Chizi (Ouyang Nana) has a crush on him. Yu Chizi also knows about his crush on Li Er. During the second year of high school, Yu Chizi finds out that her best friend Si Jiali (Zou Yuanqing) also had an encounter with Duan Bowen and finds out Si Jiali's secret. Yu Chizi takes a picture of Si Jiali and Duan Bowen hugging at a bar and posts the picture on the school talkpage. Si Jiali is reprimanded and expelled from school. To make Duan Bowen jealous, Yu Chizi kisses her friend Hengdao (Zhang Chenghang), who has a crush on her. Duan Bowen is nonplussed and confronts Yu Chizi about the picture. Yu Chizi puts on an innocent facade, and he forgives her.

== Cast ==
- Chen Feiyu as Duan Bowen
- Mi Mi as Li Er
- Ouyang Nana as Yu Chizi
- Zou Yuanqing as Si Jiali
- Zhang Chenghang as Hengdao
- Oho Ou as Zhang Yang
- Yong Mei as Mother Yu
- Zhang Yao as Dong Jialei

== See also ==
- The Left Ear (2015)
