= Kaori Ito =

Japanese dancer and choreographer (born 1979)

- 伊藤郁女
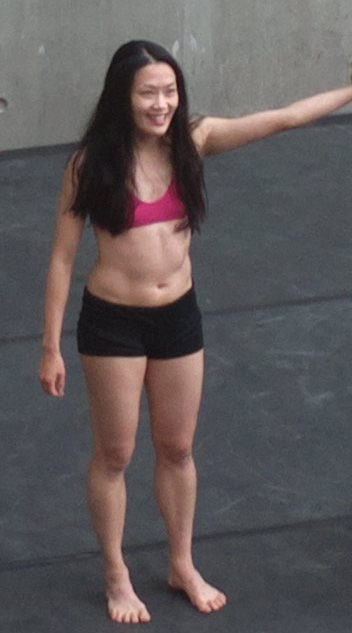
- Education: State University of New York at Purchase and Rikkyo University
- Occupations: Dancer and choreographer

Kaori Ito (伊藤郁女)(born 1979) is a Japanese dancer and choreographer who is active in France. She founded the dance company Hime.

== Early life and education ==
Ito was born in 1979 in Tokyo, Japan. She began studying dance at 5 years old, learning from Syuntoku Takagi (高木俊徳). She studied at Purchase College in the United States, and earned a degree in sociology and education from Rikkyo University in Tokyo. After graduation, Ito received a grant from the Japanese government to study in New York with the Alvin Ailey Dance Theatre.

== Career ==
Ito began her career by dancing works choreographed by Philippe Decouflé and Angelin Preljocaj. In 2008, she began to choreograph her own works, and created a dance company called Hime in 2014. She was awarded the Chevalier of the Ordre des Arts et des Lettres in 2015.

Some of Ito's best known works include "Plexus", a collaboration with Aurélien Bory in which Ito hung from strings at the Brooklyn Academy of Music; and "I dance because I do not trust words", a duet piece with her father, sculptor Hiroshi Ito.
