= Tao Xuan =

Chinese politician

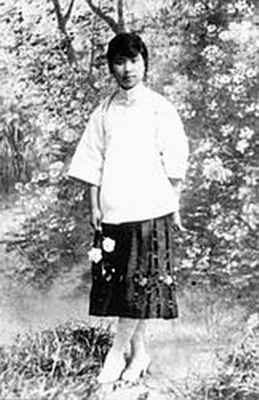

Member of the Legislative Yuan
- In office 1928–1935

Personal details
- Born: 1899; Zhejiang, China
- Died: 1972

Tao Xuan (pinyin: Táo Xuán; Wade–Giles: T'ao^{2} Hsuan^{2}, 1899–1972) was a Chinese educator and politician. She was one of the first group of three women appointed to the Legislative Yuan in 1928.

== Biography ==
Tao was born in Zhejiang province in 1899, originally from Taoyan in Shaoxing County. She attended the No. 1 Women's Normal School in Shanxi province, after which she enrolled in Chinese Language and Literature course at Peking Women's Normal University in 1917. In 1919 she transferred to the National Normal School for Women. Following the start of the May Fourth Movement, she was elected president of the Peking Federation of Women's Studies. In 1922 she was appointed headmistress of Peking No. 1 Girls' Middle School.

In 1928 she was appointed to the first Legislative Yuan, one of three women alongside Soong Mei-ling and Zheng Yuxiu. She was later appointed to the second and third legislatures, remaining in office until 1935. In 1930 she became headmistress of Nanjing Girls' High School. Six years later she was appointed head of the World School Shanghai in 1936.

During the Second Sino-Japanese War she was appointed to the National Political Assembly in 1938 and headed the Girls Department in the Kuomintang Youth Corps from 1940 to 1941. After the war she was a delegate to the 1946 Constituent National Assembly that drew up the constitution of the Republic of China. She remained in China following the Civil War and was elected to Jiangsu Province Chinese People's Political Consultative Conference in 1955.

Never married, she died in 1972.
