= Socrates in Love =

2001 novel by Kyoichi Katayama

世界の中心で、愛をさけぶ (Sekai no Chūshin de, Ai o Sakebu)
- Genre: Romance, Tragedy
- Novel
- Written by: Kyoichi Katayama
- Published by: Shogakukan
- English publisher: NA: Viz Media
- Published: 2001
- Manga
- Written by: Kazumi Kazui
- Published by: Shogakukan
- English publisher: NA: Viz Media
- Magazine: Petit Comic
- Original run: January 2004 – February 2004
- Live-action film
- Directed by: Isao Yukisada
- Written by: Yuji Sakamoto; Chihiro Ito
- Studio: Toho
- Released: May 8, 2004
- Runtime: 138 minutes
- Television drama
- Directed by: Yukihiko Tsutsumi; Yasuharu Ishii; Yuichiro Hirakawa
- Written by: Yoshiko Morishita
- Music by: Shin Kono
- Original network: TBS
- Original run: July 2, 2004 – September 10, 2004
- Episodes: 11
- Related works
- Crying Out Love, In the Center of the World (2004 radio drama); Crying Out Love, In the Center of the World (2005 musical); My Girl and I (2005 Korean film); Crying Out in Love (2016 Chinese film)

Socrates in Love (恋するソクラテス, Koi Suru Sokuratesu) is a 2001 Japanese melodrama novel, written by Kyoichi Katayama and published by Shogakukan, which revolves around narrator Sakutaro Matsumoto's recollections of a school classmate he once loved.

It is also known as Crying Out Love, In the Center of the World (世界の中心で、愛をさけぶ, Sekai no Chūshin de, Ai o Sakebu), which author Katayama used after his editors advised that his original novel title Socrates in Love would not work.

== Plot summary ==
In a small town of southern Japan, Sakutaro "Saku" Matsumoto and Aki Hirose, classmates since junior high, become high school students. During this time they begin to date and their conversations circle around the idea of what love really is, beginning after Saku's grandfather shares his own past love story with Saku.

After a trip the two take to an abandoned island, Aki discovers she has leukemia, which limits her chances to go outside or see Saku. Once Saku learns the truth, he buys flight tickets to take Aki to Australia's Uluru (Ayers Rock); a place she had always wanted to visit after missing the school trip there, but she dies before she could board the plane.

The story takes place as a flashback through Saku's eyes as he and Aki's parents travel to Australia to spread Aki's ashes in the place she had always wanted to see.

== Main characters ==
- Sakutaro "Saku" Matsumoto (松本朔太郎 Matsumoto Sakutarō, サク "Saku"): the narrator who's referred as "Saku-chan" by Aki. His name is taken from Japanese poet Sakutarō Hagiwara's name.
- Aki Hirose (廣瀬亜紀 Hirose Aki, アキ "Aki"): Saku's classmate who later becomes his girlfriend. She has leukemia.
- Ryunosuke Oki (大木龍之介 Ōki Ryūnosuke): a classmate of Saku and Aki. His name is based on Japanese writer Ryūnosuke Akutagawa's name.
- Kentaro Matsumoto (松本謙太郎 Matsumoto Kentarō): Saku's grandfather.

== About the title ==
Socrates in Love is the English translation of author Katayama's original Japanese title, 恋するソクラテス (Koi Suru Sokuratesu).

The novel and its manga adaptation (illustrated by Kazumi Kazui) were published in the United States by VIZ Media under the English translated title of author Katayama's original title.

The 2004 film title, Sekai no Chūshin de, Ai o Sakebu, is abbreviated in Japan as Sekachū (セカチュー).

To date, the 2005 Hong Kong DVD release of the 2004 film adaptation is the only English-language release that has its title Crying Out Love, In the Center of the World in English. The 2004 film and the 2004 TV series still haven't been released to the English-language market outside Hong Kong.

== Notes about the novel ==
Katayama had intended Socrates in Love as part of a trilogy to explore the concept and themes of youth and memories. His editors however decided to take advantage of the "pure Love boom"—a Japanese media trend of novels and films that portray a chaste, undying and tragic love—by publishing the novel under Crying Out Love, in the Center of the World to appeal fans of tragic love stories. In spite of this, only 8,000 copies of the book were printed and distributed, due to the poor sales of Katayama's two previous novels.

A year after the novel's publication, celebrity actress Kou Shibasaki wrote in a guest column for Japanese monthly literary and pop culture magazine Da Vinci (March 2002 issue): "I read it thoroughly even though it made me cry. I wished to have such a relationship in my life." The book became a best-seller, due to Shibasaki's recommendation and the word of mouth. In May 2004 over 3 million copies were sold, surpassing the sales record of Haruki Murakami's Norwegian Wood. Shibasaki subsequently appeared in the 2004 film version.

== Film and television adaptations ==
=== Japanese film (2004) ===
Crying Out Love, In the Center of the World was opened nationally in Japan on 8 May 2004, which brought Masami Nagasawa recognition as an actress. It was a huge success, and its theme song, "Hitomi o Tojite" ("With My Eyes Closed") by Ken Hirai, had record sales as well.

=== Television drama (2004) ===
Crying out Love, in the Center of the World was adapted as an 11-episode TV drama series, directed by Yukihiko Tsutsumi, and broadcast every Friday on TBS at 10 pm, from 2 July to 10 September, in 2004.

Like the film, the drama features an original character that doesn't appear in the novel — Aki Kobayashi, a single-mother friend of adult Sakutaro. She has feelings for him, but he struggles not to see her as the late Aki's replacement. Their situation is complicated when Aki's young son sees Saku as a father figure.

The drama's theme song, "Katachi Aru Mono" (Some Kind of Form), is notable for having been written and performed by Kou Shibasaki, who appeared as Ritsuko Fujimura in the 2004 film adaptation.

==== Staff ====
- Script - Yoshiko Morishita
- Filming - Satoru Karasawa
- Direction - Yukihiko Tsutsumi, Yasuharu Ishii, Yuichiro Hirakawa
- Producer - Akihiko Ishimaru
- Theme song - "Katachi Aru Mono" (かたちあるもの; Something With A Form) by Kou Shibasaki

==== Cast ====
- Takayuki Yamada - Sakutaro "Saku" Matsumoto (age 17)
- Haruka Ayase - Aki Hirose
- Naoto Ogata - Sakutaro "Saku" Matsumoto (age 34)
- Sachiko Sakurai - Aki Kobayashi
- Koutaro Tanaka - Ryunosuke Ooki
- Tasuku Emoto - Akiyoshi Nakagawa
- Yuika Motokariya - Tomoyo Ueda
- Kaho - Fumiko Matsumoto
- Yuki Matsushita - Toshimi Yatabe
- Katsumi Takahashi - Junichiro Matsumoto
- Satoko Oshima - Tomiko Matsumoto
- Satomi Tezuka - Ayako Hirose
- Tomokazu Miura - Makoto Hirose
- Tatsuya Nakadai (Special appearance) - Kentaro Matsumoto

==== Awards ====
Year	Award	Category	Recipients	Result
2004	42nd Television Drama Academy Awards	Best Drama		Won
2004	42nd Television Drama Academy Awards	Best Actor	Takayuki Yamada	Won
2004	42nd Television Drama Academy Awards	Best Supporting Actress	Haruka Ayase	Won
2004	42nd Television Drama Academy Awards	Best New Face	Koutaro Tanaka	Won
2004	42nd Television Drama Academy Awards	Best Scriptwriter	Yoshiko Morishita	Won
2004	42nd Television Drama Academy Awards	Best Director	Yukihiko Tsutsumi, Yasuharu Ishii, Yuichiro Hirakawa	Won
2004	42nd Television Drama Academy Awards	Best Theme song	"Katachi Aru Mono" by Kou Shibasaki	Won
2004	42nd Television Drama Academy Awards	Best Casting		Won
2004	42nd Television Drama Academy Awards	Best Title Background		Won

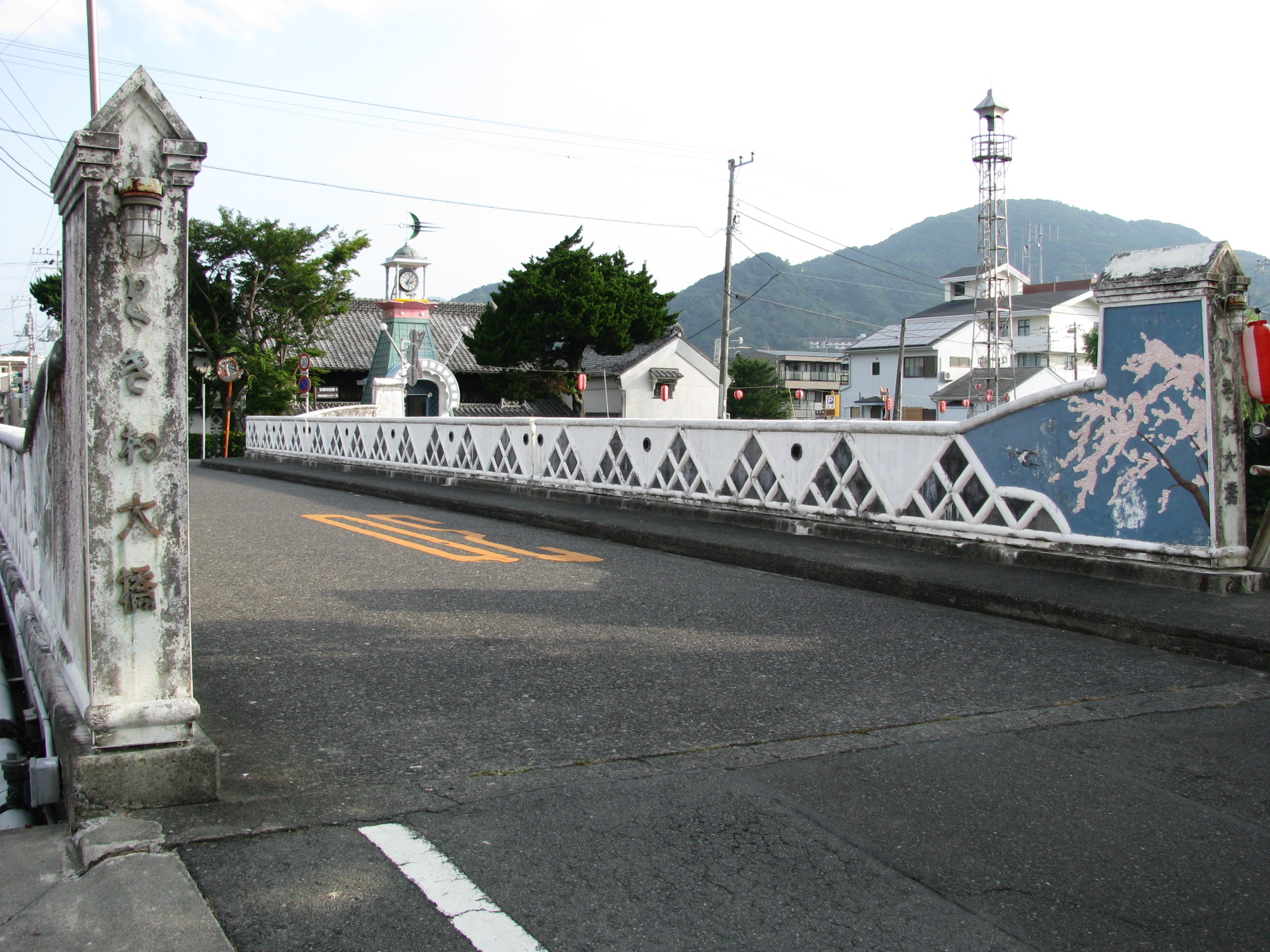
Tokiwa Bridge of Matsusaki-cho

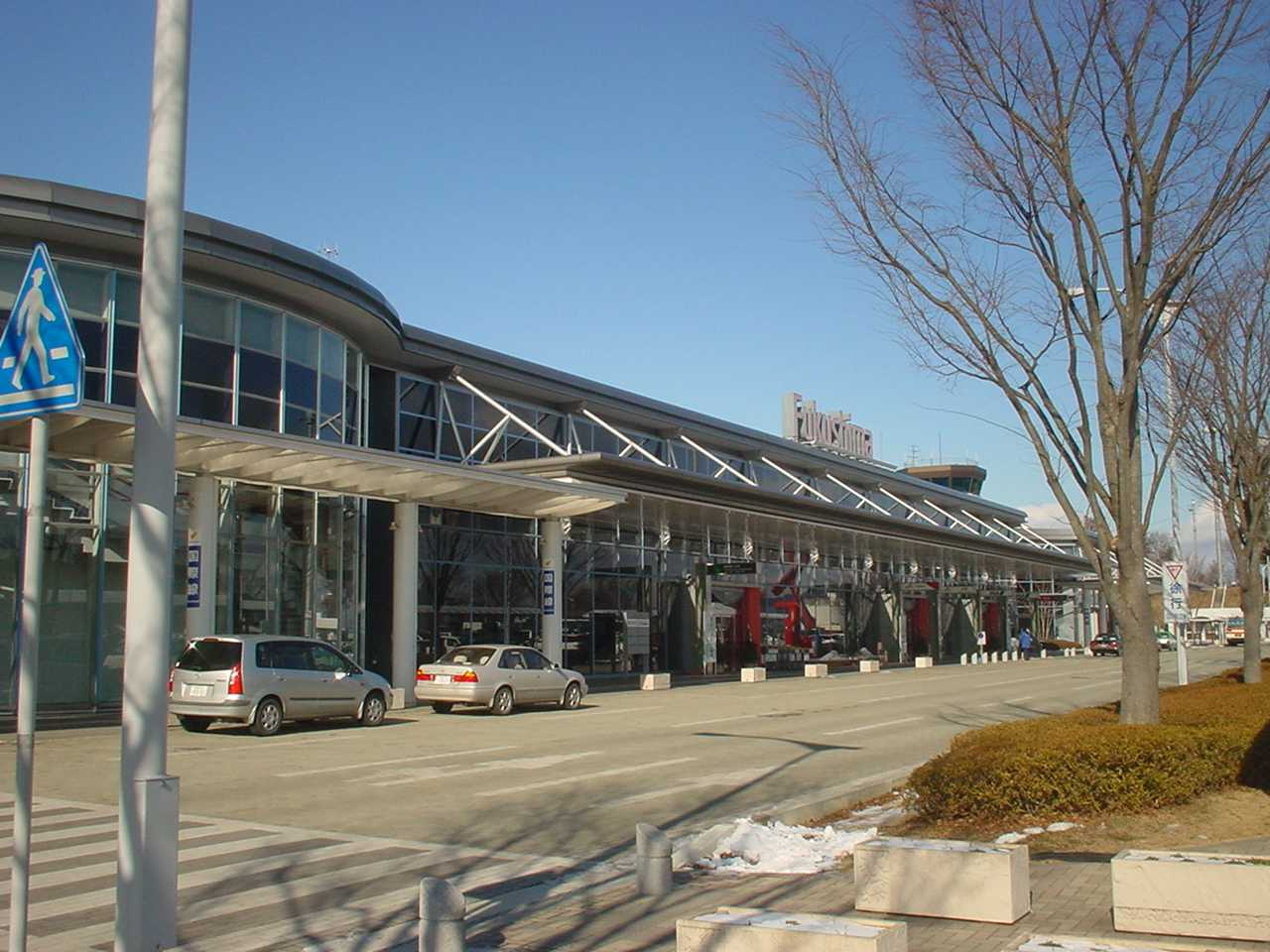
Airport

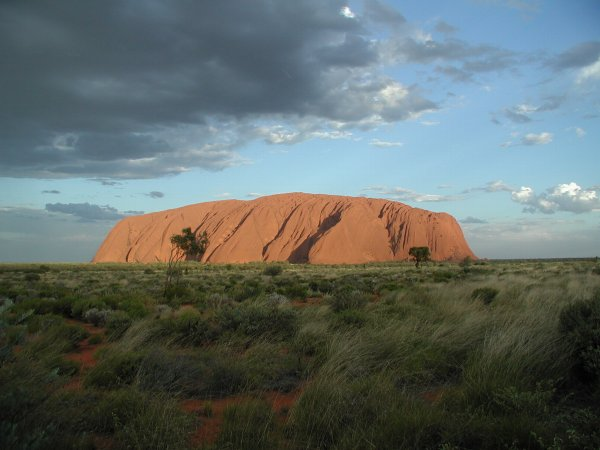
Uluru

=== Korean film (2004) ===
The 2004 film was remade and released in South Korea as My Girl and I on 23 December 2005. It was then released in Japan on 26 August 2006, under its Japanese title, You Are the Center of My World (僕の、世界の中心は、君だ Boku no, Sekai no Chūshin wa, Kimi da).

== See also ==
- YU-NO: A Girl Who Chants Love at the Bound of this World
- The Beast That Shouted Love at the Heart of the World
