= Rao Xueman =

Chinese blogger

- 饶雪漫
- Born: 11 December 1972 (age 53); Zigong, Sichuan, China
- Education: Sichuan University of Science and Engineering
- Occupations: Novelist, short story writer, essayist, blogger
- Writing career
- Language: Chinese
- Period: 1986–present
- Genre: Novel
- Notable work: The Left Ear

Chinese name
- Simplified Chinese: 饶雪漫
- Traditional Chinese: 饒雪漫
Transcriptions
Standard Mandarin
- Hanyu Pinyin: Ráo Xuěmàn
- Website: blog.sina.com.cn/raoxueman

Rao Xueman (饶雪漫; born 11 December 1972) is a Chinese author, novelist, and short story writer. She was known for her "Teenage love themed literature". She has published more than thirty novels to date.

== Biography ==
Rao Xueman was born in Zigong, Sichuan in 1972. She began writing at 14 years old. In 1994, she was admitted to the Sichuan University of Science and Engineering. After graduating from university, Rao Xueman, along with Wu Meizhen (伍美珍) and Yu Yujun (郁雨君), established "Flower Clothes" (花衣裳), the first writer combination in China. Later, she became an editor and host. Now, she is a best-selling author.

Rao Xueman's first "Teenage love themed literature" novel, "The Elfin's Golden Castle" (小妖的金色城堡), was first published in 2004.

Her fiction, The Left Ear, was made into a successful film in 2015. Secret Fruit was also adapted into a film. A new film based on one of her novels, titled Sandglass, is scheduled for release in 2016.
