= Kyoichi Katayama =

Japanese author (born 1959)

Kyoichi Katayama (片山 恭一, Katayama Kyōichi; born January 5, 1959) is a Japanese author.

== Biography ==
Katayama was born in the Ehime Prefecture and graduated from Kyushu University. Katayama's first major book was Sign (Japanese: 気配), which won the 63rd Bungakukai Newcomers Award in 1986.

Katayama wrote the book Socrates in Love (also known as Crying Out Love, In the Center of the World). The book was adapted into a manga (illustrated by Kazumi Kazui), a film and a Japanese television drama. Socrates in Love was his first and, as of 2008, only book translated into English.

Katayama's works:

- Kehai (Sign)
- Socrates in Love (Crying Out Love, In the Center of the World)
- John Lennon o Shinjiru na (Don't Believe in John Lennon)
- Mangetsu no Yoru, Moby Dick ga (Night of the Full Moon, Moby Dick)
- Moshimo Watashi ga, Soko ni Irunaraba (If I Were There)
