= List of Chinese films of 2017 =

The following is a list of mainland Chinese films first released in year 2017.

== Box office ==
These are the top 10 grossing Chinese films that were released in China in 2017:

Highest-grossing domestic films of 2017 in China
Rank	Title	Domestic gross
1	Wolf Warrior 2	$854,248,869
2	Never Say Die	$333,937,573
3	The Ex-File 3: The Return of the Exes	$318,900,000
4	Kung Fu Yoga	$254,531,595
5	Journey to the West: The Demons Strike Back	$239,553,888
6	Youth	$235,900,000
7	Duckweed	$152,405,087
8	Buddies in India	$109,835,197
9	Wu Kong	$103,489,838
10	Legend of the Demon Cat	$87,900,000

== Films released ==
=== January–March ===
Opening		Title	Director	Cast	Genre	Notes	Ref.
J A N U A R Y	3	You Jia	Hao Ran	Guo Jiaming, Pan Jie, Miao Miao, Sun Jiayu, Simon Twu	Drama		
J A N U A R Y	6	G.E.M.: G-Force	Nick Wickham	G.E.M.	Documentary / Music		
J A N U A R Y	6	Ghost in Barber's	Lu Shilei	Yin Guoer, Ren Qingan, Kang Sung-goo	Romance / Suspense / Thriller		
J A N U A R Y	6	Romantic Warrior	Liu Xiatong	Danny Chan Kwok-kwan, Xu Dongmei, Yoo Seung-jun	Comedy / Action / Romance		
J A N U A R Y	6	The Young with No Fear	Wu Dongmin	Shi Yuanting, Qu Tongyu, Li Bingrun	Romance		
J A N U A R Y	7	GG Bond: Guarding	Lu Jinming; Zhong Yu	Jackson Yi, Chen Yi, Zhang Zikun	Comedy / Animation / Fantasy		
J A N U A R Y	7	Sinbad and Mermaid Princess	Li Xia	Wang Xueqin, Yang Jin, Tang Zezong	Comedy / Animation / Fantasy / Adventure		
J A N U A R Y	13	Backkom Bear: Agent 008			Comedy / Animation / Family / Adventure		
J A N U A R Y	13	Bicycle Boy 2	Liu Kexin	Shan Xin, Qiao Shiyu, Li Shanshan	Animation / Fantasy / Adventure		
J A N U A R Y	13	Dou Dou Di Di Zhi Mei Meng Nian Nian	Wang Longbo; Lu Jinming	Liao Bilan, Wang Xiaoli	Animation		
J A N U A R Y	13	The Express	Willie Ying	Leon Lee, Tang Jingmei, Shen Jianhong	Thriller		
J A N U A R Y	13	The Verse of Us	Wu Feiyue; Qin Xiaoyu	Chen Nianxi, Wu Xia, Wu Niaoniao	Documentary	Entered into the 2015 Shanghai International Film Festival	
J A N U A R Y	13	Young Love Lost	Xiang Guoqiang	Dong Zijian, Li Meng, Shang Tielong	Drama / Comedy		
J A N U A R Y	20	Lack of Love	Zeng Guangyong	Gong Beibi, Feng Wenjuan, Guo Yan	Drama		
J A N U A R Y	20	The Magical Dou	Meng Hui	Guo Taixu, Shiliang Yixiao, Wu Bing	Comedy / Animation / Fantasy		
J A N U A R Y	20	Plan Egg	Li Yangwu	Hu Ting, Zhou Wei, Meng Yutian	Comedy / Animation / Children / Adventure		
J A N U A R Y	28	Boonie Bears: Entangled Worlds	Ding Liang	Shang Wenjie, Bao Chunlai, Sun Jianhong	Animation / Children		
J A N U A R Y	28	Buddies in India	Wang Baoqiang	Wang Baoqiang, White. K, Yue Yunpeng	Comedy / Action / Adventure		
J A N U A R Y	28	Duckweed	Han Han	Deng Chao, Eddie Peng, Zhao Liying	Drama / Comedy		
J A N U A R Y	28	Journey to the West: The Demons Strike Back	Tsui Hark	Kris Wu, Lin Gengxin, Yao Chen	Comedy / Fantasy / Adventure / Costume	Mainland-Hong Kong co-production	
J A N U A R Y	28	Kung Fu Yoga	Stanley Tong	Jackie Chan, Aarif Rahman, Lay	Comedy / Action / Adventure	Mainland-India co-production	
J A N U A R Y	28	The Village of No Return	Chen Yu-hsun	Shu Qi, Wang Qianyuan, Joseph Chang	Drama / Comedy / Fantasy / Costume	Mainland-Taiwan co-production	
F E B R U A R Y	3	Once Upon a Time in the Northeast	Guo Dalei	Jia Nailiang, Ma Li, Wang Xun	Comedy / Action		
F E B R U A R Y	5	Lighting Dindin	Deng Weifeng	Shan Xin, Yao Lei, Guo Sheng	Comedy / Animation / Fantasy / Adventure		
F E B R U A R Y	10	Cook Up a Storm	Raymond Yip	Jung Yong Hwa, Ge You, Nicholas Tse, Tiffany Tang	Drama / Action	Mainland-Hong Kong co-production	
F E B R U A R Y	10	Journey to the Forbidden Valley	Ethan Wiley	Sasha Jackson, Jonathan Kos-Read, Douglas Tait	Action / Family / Adventure	Mainland-United States co-production	
F E B R U A R Y	10	The Game Changer	Gao Xixi	Peter Ho, Huang Zitao, Gülnezer Bextiyar	Action		
F E B R U A R Y	12	Purple Love	Ma Aimin; Lin Qianyi	Xia Wang, Cui Jingge, Waise Lee	Drama		
F E B R U A R Y	14	Love Contractually	Liu Guonan	Sammi Cheng, Joseph Chang, Lam Suet	Comedy / Romance		
F E B R U A R Y	14	Revenge for Love	Chung Siu-hung	Yue Yunpeng, Yuan Shanshan, Oscar Sun	Comedy / Romance		
F E B R U A R Y	14	Superposition of Love	He Feng	Lee Young-hoon, Pan Siyu, Lei Pengyu, Zhang Jingsheng	Drama / Romance		
F E B R U A R Y	17	An Umbrella Conspiracy	Steven Joo	Wen Zhuo, Zhu Jiaxi, Li Yuan	Suspense / Horror		
F E B R U A R Y	17	The Door	Liang Dong	Jiang Wu, Jiang Qinqin, Li Naiwen	Comedy / Romance / Fantasy		
F E B R U A R Y	17	Lord of Shanghai	Sherwood Hu	Hu Jun, Yu Nan, Rhydian Vaughan	Drama / Action / Romance	Entered into the 2016 Shanghai International Film Festival	
F E B R U A R Y	18	I Am From the Moon	Xia Jiawei	Xia Jiawei, Hong Jiantao, Xu Jingxuan	Comedy / Romance / Fantasy		
F E B R U A R Y	24	The Majhong Box	Fabien Gaillard	Tan Zhuo, Ge Zhaomei, James Alofs	Drama / Romance		
F E B R U A R Y	24	Spring Love Story	Adrian Teh Kean Kok	Ah Niu, Elanne Kong, Kara Hui	Comedy	Mainland-Hong Kong co-production	
F E B R U A R Y	24	The Summer of Yaya	Zhu Jianghua	Chu Quanzhong, Wang Yiwen. Xu Yiwen	Drama		
M A R C H	3	Bet on Love	Qiu Xiaojun	Li Muyun, Lou Yunfei, Shen Lu	Drama / Romance		
M A R C H	3	Frightening Embroidery Shoes	Wang Junlin	He Yixuan, Liu Hanzhao, Kim Tae-gwan	Horror		
M A R C H	3	H-Club	Zhao Yang	Sun Junsheng, Shi Xiaojie, An Yu	Drama		
M A R C H	3	Let's Break Up	Zhu Jianghua	Wang Jingyun, Jin Liang, Rico Kwok	Drama / Romance		
M A R C H	10	Death Ouija 2	Simon Lui	Angela Chang, Alex Fong, Kara Hui	Suspense / Horror		
M A R C H	10	Fight	Ji Lei	Ji Kaitong, Cherry Pau, Li Hua	Drama / Comedy / Action / Romance / Children		
M A R C H	10	Little Lucky	Wang Ning	Allen Ai, Wang Zijian, Tian Liang	Comedy / Romance		
M A R C H	10	Lost in the Moonlight	Xia Gang	Wang Qianyuan, Yu Nan, Namkoong Min, Pan Binlong	Drama		
M A R C H	10	Mr Cat & Miss Piggy	Wang Yuexin	Bruce, Zhao Yihuan, Yin Xiaotian	Comedy / Romance		
M A R C H	10	Spy Eyes	Ouyang Fenqiang	Shi Zhan, Wen Mengyang, Lan Lan	Horror		
M A R C H	14	Planning of Be in Love	Xue Fangmin	Gao Hanyu, Sookie Pan, Hou Xuelong	Story / Romance / Suspense		
M A R C H	15	Mao Fengmei	Ning Jingwu	Song Jialun, Liang Linlin	Drama / Biography		
M A R C H	17	Gun Chu Lai Xiong Shou	Shen Huoxin	Sun Yiming, Jiang Yiyi, Ai Jiani	Comedy / Romance / Suspense / Costume		
M A R C H	17	Haunted Sisters	Mo Sali	Zhang Lanyi, Liu Yichen, Liu Luoxi	Horror		
M A R C H	17	Nirvana	Xie Xiaodong	Qin Yong, Feng Bo	Drama	Entered into the 2016 Shanghai International Film Festival	
M A R C H	23	A Story of Two Wanderers					
M A R C H	23	The Call of Love					
M A R C H	24	The Summer Is Gone	Zhang Dalei	Kong Weiyi, Zhang Chen, Guo Yanyun	Drama	Entered into the FIRST Youth Film Festival	
M A R C H	24	Top Funny Comedian: The Movie					
M A R C H	28	The Legend of 1935	Zhou Qi; Ma Delin	Wang Hui, Liu Jin, Wu Jingan	Drama		
M A R C H	30	40000 Kilometers			Drama / Sports		
M A R C H	31	Business Circles			Drama		
M A R C H	31	The Devotion of Suspect X	Alec Su	Wang Kai, Zhang Luyi, Ruby Lin	Suspense / Crime		
M A R C H	31	Extraordinary Mission	Alan Mak, Anthony Pun	Huang Xuan, Duan Yihong, Lang Yueting, Zu Feng	Drama / Action / Crime		
M A R C H	31	The Missing	Xu Jinglei	Bai Baihe, Stanley Huang, Ming Dao	Action / Crime	Mainland-Hong Kong co-production	

=== April–June ===
Opening		Title	Director	Cast	Genre	Notes	Ref.
A P R I L	1	Haunted Dormitory: White Paper Girl	Lu Shilei	Xie Ronger, Verabelle, Yao Yuxin	Horror		
A P R I L	1	What A Day!	Wang Xiaokun	Fan Wei, Alyssa Chia, Liu Haojun	Drama / Comedy		
A P R I L	7	A Idiot Lost in Xiangxi	Law Kei	Dick Wei, Chen Kuan-tai, Lo Fun	Comedy / Adventure		
A P R I L	7	Eternal Love	Chang Po-jui	Wang Deshun, Li Chun, Benji Wang, Hu Xiaoling	Drama / Romance		
A P R I L	7	June and Arrow	Lin Bo	Wang Yijia, Yang Ziduo, Du Yuming	Comedy		
A P R I L	7	Inside: A Chinese Horror Story	Bai Lili	Lu Yulai	Horror		
A P R I L	11	Sea Guard			Drama		
A P R I L	14	A Nail Clipper Romance	Jason Kwan	Zhou Dongyu, Joseph Chang, Na Dow	Comedy / Romance	Entered into the 2017 Beijing International Film Festival	
A P R I L	14	Deadly Love	Wu Pinru; Lo Kim-wah	Andy On, Cica Zhou, Kent Cheng	Comedy / Romance		
A P R I L	14	Haunted Dormitory: Marionette Teacher	Lu Shilei	Xie Ronger, Verabelle, Yue Wenlong	Horror		
A P R I L	20	Mr. Pride vs Miss Prejudice	Li Haishu; Huang Yanwei	Dilraba Dilmurat, Leon Zhang, Vengo Gao	Comedy / Romance		
A P R I L	21	The Blood Hound	Liu Jianhua	Huang Hong, Liu Xiangjing, Zhao Tingting	Action / Adventure		
A P R I L	21	Love Song	Liu Jinyan	Zuo Li, Gu Jing, Yolanda Yang	Romance		
A P R I L	21	The Mysterious Family	Park Yu-hwan	Ariel Lin, Jiang Wu, Chen Xiao	Drama / Suspense / Crime	Mainland-Taiwan-South Korean co-production	
A P R I L	21	Snow in Midsummer	Yang Zhen	Wang Like, Chiu Hsin-chih, Yang Kun	Action / Suspense		
A P R I L	21	Youth Remembering Permanently	Tao Mengxi	Qi Ruyi, Hou Tongjiang, Wang Guanghui	Drama		
A P R I L	25	Hetian Jade Legend	Guo Song	Michael Tong, Wang Yinan, Ren Zhengbin	Drama		
A P R I L	27	This Is Not What I Expected	Derek Hui	Takeshi Kaneshiro, Zhou Dongyu, Sun Yizhou	Comedy / Romance	Entered into the 2017 Beijing International Film Festival	
A P R I L	28	Battle of Memories	Leste Chen	Huang Bo, Xu Jinglei, Duan Yihong, Yang Zishan, Hsu Wei-ning	Drama / Suspense / Horror / Crime	Entered into the 2017 Beijing International Film Festival	
A P R I L	28	Love Off the Cuff	Pang Ho-cheung	Shawn Yue, Miriam Yeung, Jiang Mengjie	Drama / Comedy / Romance	Mainland-Hong Kong co-production	
A P R I L	28	Shock Wave	Herman Yau	Andy Lau, Jiang Wu, Song Jia	Action / Suspense / Crime	Mainland-Hong Kong co-production	
A P R I L	28	Wu Ye Jing Hun Lu	Wang Liang	Zeng Shuai, Wang Liang, Miao Qing	Horror		
M A Y	5	Hai Kuo Tian Kong	Zhou Xiaopeng	Jackie Tam, Li Manqi, Xie Binbin	Drama / Romance		
M A Y	5	Myth Kill Joke	Yuan Jie	Wang Ning, Ge Tian, Lai Xi	Comedy		
M A Y	11	What A Wonderful Family	Huang Lei	Huang Lei, Hai Qing, Wang Xun, Lee Li-chun, Sun Li	Drama / Comedy / Family		
M A Y	12	Absurd Accident	Li Yuhe	Chen Xixu, Gao Ye, Ren Suxi	Drama / Comedy / Suspense / Crime	Entered into 2016 Shanghai International Film Festival	
M A Y	12	Dealer/Healer	Lawrence Ah Mon	Sean Lau, Gordon Lam, Louis Koo	Action / Crime	Mainland-Hong Kong co-production	
M A Y	12	Disc Fairy	Gao Yuxin	Wang Youshuo, Yi Na, Guo Ruohan	Horror		
M A Y	13	Love and Redemption	Liu Xuejian	Sookie Pan, Fang Yumeng, Shi Feng	Family		
M A Y	14	Women In Zhenba Country	Fang Yihua	Jia Yumeng, Tong Zhenjun, Guo Jia	Drama		
M A Y	18	20:16	Lv Lie	Damian Lau, Lü Xingchen, Wu Junyu	Drama		
M A Y	19	Come Across Love	Chen Zhuo	Kitty Zhang, Zhang Liang	Comedy / Romance	Mainland-United States co-production	
M A Y	19	Puppy Love	Qiao Liang	Zhao Shunran, Zhu Yanmanzi, Han Haoxuan	Romance		
M A Y	19	Special Encounter	Huang Meina	Yan Ni, Calvin Tu, Ireine Song	Drama		
M A Y	19	Wine War	Leon Lai	Zhang Hanyu, Leon Lai, David Wang, Du Juan	Action / Crime		
M A Y	19	Wrong Way Driving	Yan Xuekai	Wang Wei, Huo Jingnan, Li Kun	Action / Crime		
M A Y	20	A Story of Love	Zheng Zhen	Chris Lee, Cheng Yuanyuan, Zhao Yuanyuan	Romance	Entered into the 2017 Beijing International Film Festival	
M A Y	20	After School	Liu Yijun	Gao Jian, Li Jianuo, Dou Xuexi	Family / Children		
M A Y	26	China Salesman	Tan Bing	Ethan Li, Janicke Askevold, Mike Tyson	Drama / Action		
M A Y	26	Gui Yi Jiu Lou	Cheung Kwok-kuen	Ouyang Xinzi, Zhao Donghao, Li Lubing	Horror		
M A Y	26	The Haunted Cinema 2	Lu Shilei	Yin Guoer, Huang Zicheng, Liu Xiaoqi	Horror		
M A Y	26	Overturn	Zhang Xuzhou	Zhang Xinyue, Li Jianlong, Liu Zhenming	Drama / Romance		
M A Y	26	The World Outside	Li Ke	Van Fan, Che Yongli, Gong Geer	Comedy		
M A Y	27	Edge of Innocence	Chang Jung-chi	Huang Zitao, Yang Caiyu, Calvin Tu	Romance / Suspense		
M A Y	27	Didi's Dream	Kevin Tsai	Dee Shu, Lin Chi-ling, Jin Shijia	Comedy / Romance / Fantasy	Mainland-Taiwan co-production	
M A Y	27	God of War	Gordon Chan	Vincent Zhao, Sammo Hung, Wan Qian	Action / Biography / History / War / Costume		
M A Y	27	La Historia Du Un Amor	Cub Chin; Wong Chi-wai	Zheng Kai, Rayza, Guo Xiaodong	Comedy / Romance		
M A Y	27	My King My Father	Liu Jun; Niu Zhiyuan	Lu Dou, Yu Xiang, Lu Qi	Comedy / Animation / Fantasy		
M A Y	27	The Three Little Pigs	Liu Wei	Wang Xiaotong, Li Ye, Hong Haitian	Animation		
J U N E	1	Hong Jun Xiao Xue	Ding Lin	Qiao Dan, Tang Chupeng, Hou Dingjiang	History		
J U N E	1	Kungfu Little Rabbit	Dake Dong; Ma Yuan		Comedy / Animation		
J U N E	1	Polar Star	Zhang Yifei	Liu Mu, Wu Bing, Wang Yihan	Comedy / Family / Children		
J U N E	2	Beautiful Accident	Wi Ding-ho	Gwei Lun-mei, Wang Jingchun, Nana Ou-Yang	Comedy / Fantasy		
J U N E	2	The Door	Gao Bo	Wang Zizi, Samuel Pang, Chen Yumi	Suspense / Horror		
J U N E	2	Feng Huang Jie Feng Yu	Liu Jihuan	Lu Haihua, Liu Fangyu, Gao Fa	Drama		
J U N E	2	My Unique Childhood	Tian Yukui; Ma Jianjun	Hao Yilin, Jerry Zhu, Chen Jin	Drama / Child		
J U N E	9	Fight for Love	Cao Dawei	Wei Daxun, Guo Shutong	Comedy / Romance		
J U N E	9	How Are You	Yang Yongchun	Zhang Zifeng, Zhang Yijie, Cheng Zining	Drama / Comedy / Romance		
J U N E	9	Love Without Word	Tan Yizhi	Gao Qiang, Yu Yuexian, Li Yufeng	Drama		
J U N E	9	Huang Liang Yi Meng	Xu Yihua	Jiang Chao, Yu Jiaruo, Gao Shuyao	Drama		
J U N E	9	The Haunted Graduation Photo	Lu Shiyu	Chen Yuan, Liu Lier, Song Wei	Horror		
J U N E	9	Maidou's Summer	Ma Heping	Liu Zongjian, Stephanie Wang-Breal, Zhao Jidong	Child		
J U N E	9	Monster Mayhem	Chen Haifan	Ganyu Xiaoxue, Yu Boning, Yang Zuqing	Drama		
J U N E	9	My Heart Leaps Up	Liu Ziwei	Sun Yihan, Song Ning, Zhou Chuchu	Drama	Entered into the 2016 Shanghai International Film Festival	
J U N E	9	Shi Lian 399 Nian	Wu Tun	Zheng Wenrong, Ge Qiugu, Sun Jie	Drama / Comedy / Romance		
J U N E	9	Super Teacher	Li Jinhan	Jiang Xin, Jiu Kong, Paul Chun	Drama / Comedy		
J U N E	9	Who Knows	Liu Yanjie	Long Xinyue, Liang Chenyu, Sun Letian	Suspense / Horror		
J U N E	10	Go with Your Gut	Shi Qiurong; Hu Xian	Ba Wenhan, Qian Xiaohua, Zhuang Songlie	Documentary	Entered into the 2016 Beijing College Student Film Festival	
J U N E	13	Grow With Love	Zeng Jianying	Xu Fan, Dai Jiaxi, Liang Cuishan	Romance		
J U N E	16	China Salesman	Tan Bing	Ethan Li, Mike Tyson, Steven Seagal	Drama / Action / Romance / War		
J U N E	16	Crazy Arts	Cai Yushui	Zhang Yan, Wang Deshun, Cai Yiheng	Drama / Comedy		
J U N E	16	Return to the Wolves	Yi Feng	Li Weiyi	Documentary		
J U N E	16	Seventeen When We Are	Wang Zeyan	Cheng Qi, Xiang Yizheng, Lee Ho	Drama / Romance		
J U N E	16	Through the Eye	Zhang Yang	Benny Chan, Xue Jianing, Law Lan	Romance / Suspense / Horror		
J U N E	16	Wo De Qing Chun Ni Lai Guo	Lian Zi	Li Yijun, Zheng Boyuan, Wang Zekun	Drama / Romance		
J U N E	16	Youth Dinner	Li Yuan	Shawn Dou, Janine Chang, Vivian Wu	Drama / Romance		
J U N E	20	Paths of the Soul	Zhang Yang	Nima Zhadui, Yang Pei, Sonam Dolgar	Drama	Entered into the 2015 Toronto International Film Festival	
J U N E	23	Strangers	Xu Bing	Bai Jugang, Lian Yiming, Rayza	Drama / Action / Crime		
J U N E	23	Young & Amazing	Zhen Shiming	Jiang Chao, Zhang Jiani, Kim Eun-sung	Drama / Comedy		
J U N E	24	Mr. Zhu's Summer	Song Haolin	Sun Bo, Li Haoze, Wang Jixian	Drama / Comedy		
J U N E	29	Reset	Chang	Yang Mi, Wallace Huo, Chin Shih-chieh	Action / Science fiction		
J U N E	29	Wished	Dayyan Eng	Xia Yu, Yan Ni, Pan Binlong, Victoria Song	Comedy / Fantasy	Won Golden Angel Award at 2017 Chinese American Film Festival | Official Selection 2017 Hawaii International Film Festival	
J U N E	30	Battle of Xiang Jiang River	Chen Li	Wang Ying, Xu Jian, Dong Yong	History / War	Entered into the 2017 Shanghai International Film Festival	
J U N E	30	Echoes of Time	Tony Xue	Du Weihan, Chang Chia-yu, Chen Pengwanli	Drama / Romance / Same Sex		
J U N E	30	Encounter Evil	Li Kelong	Lai Xi, Liao Weiwei, Waise Lee	Horror		
J U N E	30	Feng Menglong's Legend	Gao Feng	Yan Weiwen, Hu Zhexing, Hou Yansong, Wu Weidong	Biography / History / Costume		
J U N E	30	Home Lost	Hu Yichuan	Dragon Chen, Elanne Kong, Luo Lanshan	Drama		
J U N E	30	Sea Guard	Zhong Guanglin	Mou Fengbin, Ngô Thanh Vân, Zhang Ningyi	Drama		
J U N E	30	Soccer Killer	Jeffrey Lau	He Jiong, Gillian Chung, Charlene Choi, Stephy Tang, Ma Li	Comedy		

=== July–September ===
Opening		Title	Director	Cast	Genre	Notes	Ref.
J U L Y	1	Muye Legend	Xie Baorui		Animation		
J U L Y	1	Our Time Will Come	Ann Hui	Zhou Xun, Eddie Peng, Wallace Huo	Drama / History / War	Entered into the 2017 Shanghai International Film Festival	
J U L Y	6	The House That Never Dies II	Chie Jen-hao	Julian Cheung, Mei Ting, Gillian Chung, Geng Le, Vivian Wu	Drama / Suspense / Horror		
J U L Y	7	Bei Wei 30 Du Zhi Ai	Hua Yuan	Chen Sina, Xiao Hong, Mao Bolong	Drama / Romance / Suspense		
J U L Y	7	Never Look Back	Jiang Ping; Jin Tao	Wang Lan	Drama / Romance		
J U L Y	7	The One	Lu Zhengyu	Lu Zhengyu, Amber Kuo, Fan Wei	Comedy / Action	Entered into the 2017 Shanghai International Film Festival	
J U L Y	7	Secret Fruit	Lien Yi-chi	Chen Feiyu, Ouyang Nana	Romance		
J U L Y	7	Young and Amazing	Zhen Shiming	Jiang Chao, Zhang Jiani, Kim Eun-sung	Drama / Comedy		
J U L Y	12	Suzhou Youth Drift in Hengdian	Chen Jian	Huang Zicheng, Dragon Shek, Huang Haibing	Action		
J U L Y	13	Dahufa	Yang Zhigang		Comedy / Action / Animation / Fantasy		
J U L Y	13	Fist & Faith	Jiang Zhuoyuan	Jing Tian, Ohu Ou, Meisa Kuroki	Drama	Mainland-Taiwan co-production	
J U L Y	13	Wu Kong	Derek Kwok	Eddie Peng, Ni Ni, Oho Ou, Shawn Yue, Zheng Shuang	Action / Fantasy / Costume		
J U L Y	14	Meow	Benny Chan	Louis Koo, Ma Li, Liu Chutian	Comedy / Fantasy	Mainland-Hong Kong co-production	
J U L Y	19	Brotherhood of Blades 2	Lu Yang	Chang Chen, Yang Mi, Zhang Yi	Action / Martial Arts / Costume	Entered into the 2017 Shanghai International Film Festival	
J U L Y	20	Our Shining Days	Wang Ran	Xu Lu, Peng Yuchang, Liu Yongxi	Drama / Comedy / Music	Entered into the 2017 Shanghai International Film Festival	
J U L Y	20	S De Mi Mi					
J U L Y	21	Father and Son	Yuan Weidong	Da Peng, Fan Wei, Zhang Tianai	Drama / Comedy	Entered into the 2017 Shanghai International Film Festival	
J U L Y	21	Mystery Zone:Soul Eating Hill					
J U L Y	21	Tea Pets				Entered into the 2017 Shanghai International Film Festival	
J U L Y	21	Zhan Dao Tu Lang					
J U L Y	25	Love of Hope	Zha Wenbai		Drama		
J U L Y	27	Wolf Warriors 2	Wu Jing	Wu Jing, Frank Grillo, Celina Jade, Wu Gang, Hans Zhang	Action		
J U L Y	28	Da Er Duo Tu Tu Zhi Mei Shi Kuang Xiang Qu	Su Da		Comedy / Animation / Adventure		
J U L Y	28	The Founding of an Army	Andrew Lau	Liu Ye, Zhu Yawen, Huang Zhizhong	Drama / History		
J U L Y	28	Ling Long Wells	Wang Liang		Suspense / Horror		
J U L Y	28	The Ring	Li Yaodong	Liu Qing, Li Haoxuan, Bai Yao	Suspense / Horror		
J U L Y	28	Tofu	Zou Yi		Animation		
A U G U S T	3	On the Pitch	Qiu Zhongwei	Yin Hang, Dai Xu, Leon Lee	Drama / Comedy		
A U G U S T	3	Once Upon a Time	Zhao Xiaoding; Anthony LaMolinara	Liu Yifei, Yang Yang, Luo Jin	Romance / Fantasy		
A U G U S T	4	Deep Well			Horror		
A U G U S T	4	Instant Hit of The Elephant Lin Wang	Li Taoge		Action / Animation / War / Adventure		
A U G U S T	4	My Other Home			Drama	Entered into the 2017 Shanghai International Film Festival	
A U G U S T	4	T-Guardians			Animation / Fantasy / Adventure		
A U G U S T	4	The Wak of Loong	Gao Feng		Action / History / War		
A U G U S T	4	Wilderness Gas Station			Suspense / Horror		
A U G U S T	4	Yuan Zui De Gao Yang			Suspense		
A U G U S T	11	The Adventurers	Stephen Fung	Andy Lau, Shu Qi, Zhang Jingchu	Action / Adventure	Hong Kong-France-Mainland co-production	
A U G U S T	11	Earth: One Amazing Day			Documentary	Mainland-United Kingdom co-production	
A U G U S T	11	Guilty of Mind	Xie Dongshen	Liao Fan, Li Yifeng, Wan Qian	Action / Suspense / Crime		
A U G U S T	11	I'm Not Bruce Lee			Action / Suspense / Horror		
A U G U S T	11	Left Eye			Horror		
A U G U S T	11	Legend of the Naga Pearls	Yang Lei	Darren Wang, Zhang Tianai, Simon Yam	Comedy / Action / Romance / Fantasy		
A U G U S T	14	Fast Hands Hung Boxer			Drama		
A U G U S T	14	Twenty Two			Documentary		
A U G U S T	17	Paradox	Wilson Yip	Louis Koo, Tony Jaa, Wu Yue	Action	Mainland-Hong Kong co-production	
A U G U S T	17	Peace Breaker	Lien Yi-chi	Aaron Kwok, Wang Qianyuan, Liu Tao	Action / Crime		
A U G U S T	18	The Enchanted Soulmates of Art	Zhang Jiancheng	Tong Yixuan, John Do, Cao Shuai	Romance		
A U G U S T	18	Happiness of Shunde Family	Du Xiaoran	Song Aitong, Xian Zhaotian, Liu Tianwei	Drama / Comedy / Romance		
A U G U S T	18	The Haunted Graduation Photo 2	Lu Shiyu	Chen Yuan, Liu Lier, Song Wei	Horror		
A U G U S T	18	One Hundred Thousand Bad Jokes II	Henry Lu; Jill Lee	Shan Xin, Hao Xianghai, Jill Lee	Comedy / Animation / Fantasy		
A U G U S T	18	Seer Movie 6: Invincible Puni	Wang Zhangjun	Luo Yuting, Zhai Wei, Wang Xiaotong	Comedy / Animation / Children / Fantasy / Adventure		
A U G U S T	18	Soul on a String	Zhang Yang	Kimba, Quni Ciren, Siano Dudiom Zahi	Drama	Entered into the 2016 Shanghai International Film Festival	
A U G U S T	18	Whose Baby am I?	Li Nan	Zheng Guolin, Cheng Haofeng, Haman Hu	Family / Crime		
A U G U S T	22	The Dance Show	Gao Yueming	Chen Cheng, Shine Zheng, Ye Yutong	Drama / Comedy / Romance		
A U G U S T	25	Fat Girl Wedding			Comedy		
A U G U S T	25	Forbidden Zoen			Romance		
A U G U S T	25	My Kitchen Lover	Yu Junhao	Kim Ki-bum, Xu Shendong, Yuen Wah	Comedy / Romance		
A U G U S T	25	Perfect Couple	Vincent Kok	Vic Chou, Fiona Sit, Ronald Cheng	Comedy / Romance		
A U G U S T	25	Seven Days			Romance / Suspense / Crime		
A U G U S T	28	A Family of Two			Drama / Comedy		
A U G U S T	28	Autumn Sunshine			Romance		
A U G U S T	28	Du Liniang			Romance / Costume		
A U G U S T	28	Miss Puff	Zhang Xinyi	Zhang Xinyi, Wang Yuexin, Tan Weiwei	Romance		
A U G U S T	28	On Fallen Wings	Joe Ma	Zhang Li, Vivian Dawson, Li Zifeng	Romance / Fantasy		
A U G U S T	30	Shepherd Girl			Drama		
A U G U S T	31	Once Again	Dai Wei	Athena Chu, Calvin Tu, Huang Zheng, Wang Zhifei, Wang Jianing	Comedy / Romance / Fantasy		
S E P T E M B E R	8	Ghost Bride	Lin Bin	Chen Yuan, Qi Ling, Zheng Wenjie	Horror		
S E P T E M B E R	8	Honeymoon Plan	Hao Ran	Oscar Sun, Chen Ran, Wang Yang	Comedy / Romance		
S E P T E M B E R	8	Mr. Zhu's Summer	Song Haolin	Sun Bo, Li Haoze, Wang Jixian	Drama / Comedy		
S E P T E M B E R	10	JoJo's Magic	Sun Aiguo	Cheng Yufei, Su Shiyi, Wang Kun	Children		
S E P T E M B E R	15	An Old Woman and The Betelnut	Jiang Liu	Ai Liya, Guo Yue, Wang Wei	Drama / Romance		
S E P T E M B E R	15	Growing Pains	Danny Pang	Xu Jiao, Hu Xia, Lu Nuo	Romance		
S E P T E M B E R	15	Mr. Cheongsam	Wang Zeyan	Wang Yu, Lee Lichun, Cheng Qi	Drama / Romance		
S E P T E M B E R	15	The Tattooist	Li Ke	Shi Yuqing, Gu Minghan, Xie Puwan	Romance / Suspense / Horror		
S E P T E M B E R	20	Hit the Beat			Romance / Music		
S E P T E M B E R	22	24 Seconds			Romance / Movement		
S E P T E M B E R	22	Crazy Journey			Drama / Comedy		
S E P T E M B E R	22	Defenders			History / War	Entered into the 2017 Shanghai International Film Festival	
S E P T E M B E R	22	Forgetting Space			Suspense / Horror		
S E P T E M B E R	22	The Frighten Studio			Horror		
S E P T E M B E R	22	In the Fog			Drama / Suspense / Crime		
S E P T E M B E R	22	Love in City			Romance		
S E P T E M B E R	22	Our Days in 6E			Drama / Romance	Mainland-Hong Kong co-production	
S E P T E M B E R	22	Puppy Love			Romance		
S E P T E M B E R	22	Please Keep Away			Suspense / Horror		
S E P T E M B E R	22	Pure Hearts: Into Chinese Showbiz	Bi Zhifei	Zhu Zhejian, Li Yanman, Chen Sihan	Drama / Comedy		
S E P T E M B E R	22	The Secret Board			Comedy / Suspense / Costume		
S E P T E M B E R	22	Sky Ladder: The Art of Cai Guo-Qiang			Documentary	Entered into the 2016 Sundance Film Festival	
S E P T E M B E R	22	Women Soldiers			War	Entered into the 2017 Shanghai International Film Festival	
S E P T E M B E R	29	City of Rock	Da Peng	Da Peng, Qiao Shan, Guli Nazha, Lee Hong-chi, Han Tongsheng, Qu Junxi	Comedy / Musical		
S E P T E M B E R	29	Sky Hunter	Li Chen	Li Chen, Fan Bingbing, Wang Qianyuan, Li Jiahang, Zhao Da, Leon Lee, Guo Mingyu, Ye Liu	Action / War		
S E P T E M B E R	30	Chasing the Dragon	Wong Jing; Jason Kwan	Donnie Yen, Andy Lau, Philip Keung	Action / Crime	Mainland-Hong Kong co-production	
S E P T E M B E R	30	The Foreigner	Martin Campbell	Jackie Chan, Pierce Brosnan	Action	Mainland-United Kingdom co-production	
S E P T E M B E R	30	Never Say Die	Song Yang; Zhang Chi-yu	Allen, Ma Li, Shen Teng	Comedy		
S E P T E M B E R	30	S.M.A.R.T. Chase	Charles Martin	Orlando Bloom, Leo Wu, Simon Yam, Lynn Hung, Hannah Quinlivan	Action / Crime / Adventure		

=== October–December ===
Opening		Title	Director	Cast	Genre	Notes	Ref.
O C T O B E R	1	Dragon Force Movie	Wang Wei	Hou Yang, Wowkie Zhang, Gina Jin	Action / Science fiction / Animation		
O C T O B E R	1	Kunta: Adventures of the Spacekids	Li Lian	Li Zhengxiang, Hong Haitian, Tao Dian	Animation		
O C T O B E R	1	The Legend of Pandas	Jiang Yefeng	Xu Qiuyang, Fan Xiaohua, Nai Tang	Animation / Suspense		
O C T O B E R	4	Dragon Blade	Chen Yuehui	Xiang Yuxing, Chen Yifan, Fan Wei	Science fiction / Fantasy		
O C T O B E R	4	Mu Qin De Xiao Xiang	Zhao Guohua	Wang Meng, Guo Yue, Ai Liya	Drama / Family		
O C T O B E R	5	Na Yi Chang Hu Xiao Er Guo De Qing Chun	Han Tian	Bu Guanjin, Liu Chang, Li Meng	Drama / Romance		
O C T O B E R	12	Haunted Road 2			Suspense / Horror		
O C T O B E R	13	Hold Your Hands			Drama		
O C T O B E R	13	Love Is a Broadway Hit	Peter Lee	Wang Likun, Godfrey Gao, Li Yuan, Wang Chuanjun	Comedy / Romance		
O C T O B E R	13	You'd Better Run			Comedy		
O C T O B E R	14	The Great Guys			Children / Fantasy		
O C T O B E R	17	Doctor's Mind			Drama / Romance		
O C T O B E R	17	Nan Ge Nan Ge			Biography		
O C T O B E R	17	Six Years, 6 Days			Drama / Romance		
O C T O B E R	18	Thirteen Gold Bars			Drama		
O C T O B E R	19	Where Has the Time Gone			Drama		
O C T O B E R	20	Daddy, Be with Me			Drama / Comedy		
O C T O B E R	20	Deep in My Heart			Drama		
O C T O B E R	20	Game of Assassins			War / Costume		
O C T O B E R	20	The Haunted Cinema 2			Horror		
O C T O B E R	20	Hu Yang De Xia Tian			Comedy / Romance		
O C T O B E R	20	Inference Notes	Zhang Tianhui	Chen Duling, Lin Po-hung, Wang Duo	Drama / Suspense		
O C T O B E R	20	Nude Love			Drama / Romance		
O C T O B E R	20	On Fallen Wings	Joe Ma	Zhang Li, Vivian Dawson, Li Zifeng	Romance / Fantasy		
O C T O B E R	24	Mr. Made			Drama / Comedy		
O C T O B E R	24	Road to the Sky			Drama / Romance		
O C T O B E R	26	A Story of Love			Drama / Romance		
O C T O B E R	27	Breathing			Drama / Suspense / Crime		
O C T O B E R	27	Fight for Love	Cao Dawei	Wei Daxun, Guo Shutong, Alina Zhang	Comedy / Romance		
O C T O B E R	27	Soul Pawn Shop			Romance / Science Fiction / Suspense		
O C T O B E R	28	Wo De Lao Bing Ye Ye			Drama / Biography / History / War		
N O V E M B E R	3	Baby Task Group	Yang Jian	Alex Fong, Kenneth Tsang, Li Qinqin	Comedy / Action		
N O V E M B E R	3	Dian Di Lian Meng	Wayne Wang	Yu Yue, Ji Xiaobing, Lu Enjie	Drama / Comedy		
N O V E M B E R	3	Eternal Wave	Chung Siu-hung	Aaron Kwok, Zhao Liying, Hans Zhang	Drama / Action / War		
N O V E M B E R	3	Love Education	Sylvia Chang	Sylvia Chang, Tian Zhuangzhuang, Lang Yueting	Drama / Romance	Entered into the 21st Busan International Film Festival	
N O V E M B E R	3	Seventy-Seven Days	Zhao Hantang	Jiang Yiyan, Zhao Hantang	Adventure		
N O V E M B E R	3	Shi Se, Xing Ye	Liu Xinhan	Van Fan, Huang Yi, Shen Mengchen	Drama / Romance		
N O V E M B E R	10	The Brink	Jonathan Li	Zhang Jin, Shawn Yue, Janice Man	Drama / Action / Crime	Mainland-Hong Kong co-production	
N O V E M B E R	10	The Chinese Widow	Bille August	Liu Yifei, Emile Hirsch, Li Fangcong, Yan Yikuan, Yu Shaoqun	Drama / Romance / War	Entered into the 2017 Shanghai International Film Festival	
N O V E M B E R	10	Flower Drum Dream of Fengyang County			Drama		
N O V E M B E R	10	Hai Kuo Tian Kong			Drama / Romance		
N O V E M B E R	10	Mr. Zhu's Summer			Drama / Comedy		
N O V E M B E R	10	Trouble Maker			Comedy		
N O V E M B E R	10	Two Wrongs Make A Right	Vincent Kok	Vic Chou, Fiona Sit, Ronald Cheng	Comedy / Romance		
N O V E M B E R	17	The Golden Monk	Wong Jing; Chung Siu-hung	Zheng Kai, Zhang Yuqi, Evonne Hsieh	Comedy / Fantasy		
N O V E M B E R	17	The Grand Song	Chou Chou	Wang Jia, Xiao Haoran, William Wei	Drama / Romance		
N O V E M B E R	17	PG Love			Drama / Comedy / Romance		
N O V E M B E R	17	The Looming Storm	Dong Yue	Duan Yihong, Jiang Yiyan, Du Yuan	Suspense / Crime	Entered into the 2017 Tokyo International Film Festival	
N O V E M B E R	17	Palace of the Damned			Suspense / Horror		
N O V E M B E R	17	Re Xie Shi Dai			Drama		
N O V E M B E R	17	Start Over Tonight			Comedy / Romance		
N O V E M B E R	21	Mr. No Problem	Mei Feng	Fan Wei, Yin Tao, Juck Zhang	Drama	Mainland-France co-production	
N O V E M B E R	23	All the Way to Bloom			Drama		
N O V E M B E R	24	28 Degrees North of Love			Drama / Romance		
N O V E M B E R	24	Angels Wear White			Drama	Mainland-France co-production	
N O V E M B E R	24	Burst of Youth			Drama / Sports		
N O V E M B E R	24	Explosion			Action / Crime		
N O V E M B E R	24	Hai Kuo Tian Kong			Drama / Romance		
N O V E M B E R	24	Inference Notes			Drama / Suspense		
N O V E M B E R	24	Manhunt	John Woo	Zhang Hanyu, Masaharu Fukuyama, Stephy Qi, Ha Ji-won, Jun Kunimura	Drama / Action / Suspense	Mainland-Hong Kong co-production	
N O V E M B E R	24	The Master			Comedy		
N O V E M B E R	24	Misleading Marriage			Drama		
N O V E M B E R	24	Shining Moment			Drama		
N O V E M B E R	24	Spirit Touch Seventh Sense			Horror		
N O V E M B E R	28	Di Andi Lian Meng			Drama / Comedy		
N O V E M B E R	28	The Eighth Day of a Week			Drama / Fantasy		
N O V E M B E R	29	Crystal Fight					
N O V E M B E R	30	Breathing			Drama / Suspense / Crime	Entered into the 73rd Venice International Film Festival	
D E C E M B E R	1	Bi Xian Zhou Yuan	Deng Andong	Luo Xiang, Juno Lee, Jiang Lanhui	Suspense / Horror		
D E C E M B E R	1	Fake Guardians			Drama / Comedy		
D E C E M B E R	1	Kill Me Please			Comedy / Crime		
D E C E M B E R	1	Our Happiness	Zhang Heluan	Guo Degang, Yu Qian, Yue Yunpeng	Drama / Comedy		
D E C E M B E R	2	Judge Zhongkui			Animation / Fantasy		
D E C E M B E R	6	Da Qin Zhi Dao			Drama / Crime		
D E C E M B E R	8	The Big Call	Oxide Pang	Cheney Chen, Joseph Chang, Gwei Lun-mei, Jiang Mengjie, Jiang Chao	Crime / Drama	Mainland-Hong Kong co-production	
D E C E M B E R	8	The Dreaming Man	Rebecca Wang	Chen Bolin, Lin Yun, Leon Zhang, Phil Chang, Paul Chun	Comedy / Romance		
D E C E M B E R	8	The North of Peking			Documentary / History		
D E C E M B E R	11	Old Beast	Zhou Ziyang	Tu Men, Wang Chaobei	Drama	Entered into the 2017 FIRST International Film Festival	
D E C E M B E R	12	The Chainbreakers	Yang Rui	Duobujie, Wang Ziyi, Yangshik Tso	Drama / History / Western	Entered into the 2017 Shanghai International Film Festival	
D E C E M B E R	12	Escaping	Li Jiahua	Cheng Pei-pei, Ma Danyang, Fu Jiawen	Thriller / Crime		
D E C E M B E R	15	Da La De Qing Chun			Drama		
D E C E M B E R	15	Love Pascal	Liu Hai	Xu Huanshan, Xi Meijuan, Zhou Zhi	Drama		
D E C E M B E R	15	Re Xie Shi Dai		Huang Shijia, Ma Yujiao, Hong Shuang	Drama		
D E C E M B E R	15	The Thousand Faces of Dunjia	Yuen Woo-ping	Da Peng, Ni Ni, Aarif Lee, Zhou Dongyu, Wu Bai	Action / Fantasy	Mainland-Hong Kong co-production	
D E C E M B E R	15	Youth	Feng Xiaogang	Huang Xuan, Miao Miao, Elane Zhong	Drama / War	Entered into the 2017 Toronto International Film Festival	
D E C E M B E R	19	Lose Love Forever	Zhang Yaoguang	Zhang Naige, Zhao Jinxia	Drama / Romance		
D E C E M B E R	22	Bleeding Steel	Leo Zhang	Jackie Chan, Show Lo, Nana Ou-Yang, Xiahou Qiyu, Callan Mulvey	Drama / Action / Science Fiction		
D E C E M B E R	22	Come On Teacher	Wu Shengji	Mike He, Elanne Kwong, Liu Yu	Drama		
D E C E M B E R	22	Legend of the Demon Cat	Chen Kaige	Huang Xuan, Shōta Sometani, Kitty Zhang, Qin Hao, Sandrine Pinna	Drama / Suspense / Fantasy / Costume	Mainland-Japanese co-production	
D E C E M B E R	22	The Liquidator	Xu Jizhou	Deng Chao, Ethan Juan, Liu Shishi	Suspense / Crime	Mainland-Hong Kong co-production	
D E C E M B E R	29	Distant Relative	Yu Tie	Wang Wei, Lan Ting, Huang Jingyi	Drama		
D E C E M B E R	29	The Ex-File 3: The Return of the Exes	Tian Yusheng	Han Geng, Zheng Kai, Kelly Yu	Comedy / Romance		
D E C E M B E R	29	Goldbuster	Sandra Ng	Sandra Ng, Shen Teng, Yue Yunpeng	Comedy		
D E C E M B E R	29	Hanson and the Beast	Xiao Yang	Feng Shaofeng, Liu Yifei, Li Guangjie	Comedy / Romance / Fantasy		
D E C E M B E R	29	Hello Yi Wu			Drama		
D E C E M B E R	29	Miracles of the Namiya General Store	Han Jie	Wang Junkai, Dilraba Dilmurat, Dong Zijian	Drama / Fantasy		
D E C E M B E R	29	Soldier Grandpa	Wang Liang	Xu Huanshan, Wang Liang, Na Wei	Drama / Biography / History / War		
D E C E M B E R	30	Caffè			Drama	Mainland-Italy-Belgium co-production	
D E C E M B E R	30	Gulu Mermaid 2			Animation / Children / Fantasy		
D E C E M B E R	30	Sunlight Summer Camp			Drama / Children		

== See also ==
- List of Chinese films of 2016
- List of Chinese films of 2018
