= List of Chinese films of 2018 =

The following is a list of mainland Chinese films first released in year 2018.

== Box office ==
These are the top 10 grossing Chinese films that were released in China in 2018:

Highest-grossing domestic films of 2018 in China
Rank	Title	Domestic gross
1	Operation Red Sea	$579,200,000
2	Detective Chinatown 2	$563,900,000
3	Dying to Survive	$438,400,000
4	Monster Hunt 2	$370,300,000
5	Hello Mr. Billionaire	$363,000,000
6	Us and Them	$225,500,000
7	The Island	$192,700,000
8	Project Gutenberg	$181,400,000
9	The Meg	$149,100,000
10	How Long Will I Love U	$127,000,000

== Films released ==
=== January–March ===
Opening		Title	Director	Cast	Genre	Notes	Ref.
J A N U A R Y	5	Come On Teacher	Wu Shengji	Mike He, Elanne Kwong, Liu Yu	Drama		
J A N U A R Y	5	Wait for Him					
J A N U A R Y	5	Wo Lai Guo	Zhou Mo	Wang Yang, Feng Mingchao, Sun Yingfei	Drama / Romance		
J A N U A R Y	12	Da Han			Drama / War		
J A N U A R Y	12	Forever Young	Li Fangfang	Zhang Ziyi, Huang Xiaoming, Chang Chen, Wang Leehom, Chen Chusheng	Drama / Romance / War		
J A N U A R Y	12	Have a Nice Day	Liu Jian	Liu Jian	Animation	Entered into the 67th Berlin International Film Festival	
J A N U A R Y	12	Keep Calm and Be a Superstar	Vincent Kok	Eason Chan, Li Ronghao, Li Yitong	Comedy / Action		
J A N U A R Y	12	Loops	Ye Xiaozhou	Ouyang Jia, Gao Xiang, Lei Nuoer	Sci-fi / Horror		
J A N U A R Y	12	Untouchable Love			Drama / Romance		
J A N U A R Y	15	Red Moon of Wuling Folk Songs			Drama		
J A N U A R Y	16	The Class of One			Drama / Children		
J A N U A R Y	16	Hidden Peril			Drama		
J A N U A R Y	16	My Running Shadow	Fang Gangliang	Zhang Jingchu, Long Pinxu, Li Zhaofeng	Drama / Family / Children	Entered into the 2013 Shanghai International Film Festival	
J A N U A R Y	18	A Better Tomorrow 2018	Ding Sheng	Wang Kai, Ma Tianyu, Darren Wang, Yu Ailei, Lam Suet	Drama / Action		
J A N U A R Y	19	The Drifting Red Balloon	Zheng Laizhi	Tan Youming, Shi Yufei, Zhao Hanyingzi	Drama / Comedy / Romance		
J A N U A R Y	19	Guardians of the Tomb	Kimble Rendall	Li Bingbing, Kellan Lutz, Wu Chun, Kelsey Grammer, Stef Dawson	Action / Adventure	Mainland-Australia co-production	
J A N U A R Y	20	The Song of the Angels			Drama		
J A N U A R Y	23	Wait Here	Guo Yilin	Bowie Lam, Maria Makarenko, Jonathan Kos-Read	Comedy / Romance / Adventure	Entered into the 2017 Golden Maple Leaf Canadian Film Festival	
J A N U A R Y	25	A Loner	Xing Xiao	Zhu Xijuan, Guo Zhi, Zhang Tong	Drama	Entered into the 2017 Shanghai International Film Festival	
J A N U A R Y	26	Super Four			Comedy		
J A N U A R Y	26	The 5th Dimension			Suspense / Horror		
J A N U A R Y	26	The Waxing Moon			Drama / Family		
J A N U A R Y	27	Piggy Bingbing			Comedy		
J A N U A R Y	30	The Drifting Red Balloon	Zheng Laizhi	Tan Youming, Shi Yufei, Zhao Hanyingzi	Drama / Comedy / Romance		
F E B R U A R Y	1	The Girl From Future	Wu Qin	Wang Anqi, Wang Chen, Gao Han	Romance / Fantasy		
F E B R U A R Y	2	Bad Daddy			Drama		
F E B R U A R Y	2	Blind Way	Li Yang	Li Yang, Du Hanmeng, Yu Yue	Drama / Crime	Entered into the 2017 Beijing International Film Festival	
F E B R U A R Y	2	Don't Know Why I Like You			Drama / Family		
F E B R U A R Y	2	Find My Way Home			Family / Children		
F E B R U A R Y	2	The Ladybug			Animation / Family / Adventure		
F E B R U A R Y	2	No Money			Comedy		
F E B R U A R Y	2	Till the End of the World	Wu Youyin	Mark Chao, Yang Zishan	Romance / Adventure		
F E B R U A R Y	3	Me and the Traitor, Dad			Drama / Children / Sports		
F E B R U A R Y	6	On the Way			Drama / Romance / Western		
F E B R U A R Y	9	The Chaser	Zhang Fan	Song Yang, Chunyu Shanshan, Andrew Lin	Suspense / Horror		
F E B R U A R Y	9	Master Returns	Li Chengru	Li Chengru, Wang Ji, Zhang Tong	Comedy		
F E B R U A R Y	9	Miss Puff	Zhang Xinyi	Zhang Xinyi, Wang Yuexin, Tan Weiwei	Drama / Romance		
F E B R U A R Y	9	Panda Stone Fantasy Travel			Children / Fantasy / Adventure		
F E B R U A R Y	9	Wild Kids			Comedy / Children		
F E B R U A R Y	14	Love One Way Train			Romance		
F E B R U A R Y	16	Boonie Bears: The Big Shrink	Ding Liang; Lin Huida	Zhang Wei, Zhang Bingjun, Tan Xiao	Comedy / Animation / Adventure		
F E B R U A R Y	16	Detective Chinatown 2	Chen Sicheng	Wang Baoqiang, Liu Haoran, Xiao Yang, Natasha Liu Bordizzo, Shang Yuxian	Comedy / Action / Suspense		
F E B R U A R Y	16	The Faces of My Gene	Guo Degang	Yue Yunpeng, Wu Jing, Wu Xiubo, Jing Boran, Lin Chi-ling	Comedy / Fantasy		
F E B R U A R Y	16	The Monkey King 3	Cheang Pou-soi	Aaron Kwok, Feng Shaofeng, Zhao Liying, Xiaoshenyang, Him Law	Comedy / Romance / Fantasy	Mainland-Hong Kong co-production	
F E B R U A R Y	16	Monster Hunt 2	Raman Hui	Tony Leung, Bai Baihe, Jing Boran, Li Yuchun, Tony Yang	Comedy / Fantasy	Mainland-Hong Kong co-production	
F E B R U A R Y	16	Operation Red Sea	Dante Lam	Zhang Yi, Huang Jingyu, Hai Qing, Du Jiang, Jiang Luxia	Drama / Action	Mainland-Hong Kong co-production	
F E B R U A R Y	17	After the STA	Li Jinlin	Li Shihong, Guan Feiyang, Chen Jiaming	Drama / Children		
F E B R U A R Y	20	Fat and Fame			Comedy		
M A R C H	1	Go Sister	Wang Zheng	Feng Mingchao, Zhao Duona, Chen Meixing	Comedy		
M A R C H	2	A Mysterious Tribe in China			Drama / Romance		
M A R C H	2	Amazing China			Documentary		
M A R C H	2	Girls 2	Wong Chun-chun	Fiona Sit, Ivy Chen, Janine Chang, Mike Tyson, Wang Shuilin	Drama / Comedy	Mainland-Hong Kong co-production	
M A R C H	2	Love Only	Chen Sixing	Seungri, Bea Hayden, Michelle Bai, Li Xiaonan, Lee Hyun-jae	Comedy / Romance / Science fiction		
M A R C H	7	To Us, From Us	Lanxin Yu	Yanxi Ke, Hai Qin, Jingwen Xiong	High School/Drama	Mainland	
M A R C H	8	Crazy Bull			Drama / Comedy	Mainland-Hong Kong co-production	
M A R C H	8	Marriage Rings	Zuo Weichen	Yang Ziyan, Steven Ma	Drama / Romance		
M A R C H	9	Duck Duck Goose			Comedy / Animation / Family / Adventure	Mainland-United States co-production	
M A R C H	9	Soul Pawn Shop	Liu Heyao	Qiao Qiao, Jiang Fangting, Cao Weiyu	Romance / Science fiction / Suspense		
M A R C H	16	Battle of Hip Hopera			Drama / Romance / Song and Dance	Mainland-Taiwan co-production	
M A R C H	16	Linglong Wells			Suspense / Thriller		
M A R C H	23	24 Seconds	Ji Gang	Huang Junjie, Wei Wanqiu, Yan Luhan	Romance / Sports		
M A R C H	23	The Bystander	Shen Rong	Li Yanan, Yuan Lingyan, Yu Fei, Hong Soo-ah	Suspense / Thriller		
M A R C H	23	Shed Skin Papa	Roy Szeto	Francis Ng, Louis Koo	Drama / Comedy / Fantasy	Mainland-Hong Kong co-production	
M A R C H	29	Excellent Doctor from Hejian			Drama / Biography / History / Costume		
M A R C H	29	Nice to Meet You	Gu Changwei	White. K, Lyric Lan, Zhang Haiyu	Drama / Comedy / Romance		
M A R C H	30	Dating Master	Tian Chao	Chen Sicheng, Ni Hongjie, Chie Tanaka	Comedy / Romance		
M A R C H	30	Defying Chase	Li Bingyuan	Li Bingyuan, David Belle, Li Binglei	Comedy / Action		
M A R C H	30	Really?	Liu Yiwei	Xiaoshenyang, Ivy Chen, Wu Yue	Comedy / Action / Suspense		
M A R C H	31	The Rented Wife			Comedy / Romance		

=== April–June ===
Opening		Title	Director	Cast	Genre	Notes	Ref.
A P R I L	4	Knife in the Clear Water	Wang Xuebo	Yang Shengcang	Drama	Entered into the 21st Busan International Film Festival	
A P R I L	4	Nuts	Li Xin; Li Yang	Zhang Ruoyun, Ma Sichun, Li Xian	Comedy / Romance		
A P R I L	4	Wrath of Silence	Xin Yukun	Song Yang, Jiang Wu, Yuan Wenkang	Drama / Suspense / Crime	Entered into the 2017 FIRST International Film Festival	
A P R I L	5	Cats and Peachtopia	Gary Wang	Li Yufeng, Yang Yanze, Wakin Chau	Animation / Family / Adventure		
A P R I L	13	After Driving Youth			Drama / Romance		
A P R I L	13	Justice in Northwest	Huang Huang	Simon Yam, Yu Nan, Samuel Pang, Jack Kao	Drama / Crime		
A P R I L	13	Looking for Rohmer	Wang Chao	Han Geng, Jérémie Elkaïm, Jian Renzi	Drama / Romance	Mainland-France co-production	
A P R I L	13	Love Trip	Xu Bin	Zhang Yishan, Ding Ding, Zhu Yongteng	Drama / Romance / Adventure		
A P R I L	13	Mid-Night	Wang Jinger	Chen Meixing, Zhou Gengyu, Wang Zihang	Suspense / Thriller		
A P R I L	18	The Coin			Comedy		
A P R I L	19	No.1 Villa			Drama / Suspense		
A P R I L	19	Song of Canal Head			Drama		
A P R I L	20	21 Karat	He Nian	Guo Jingfei, Dilraba Dilmurat, Dong Chengpeng	Comedy / Romance		
A P R I L	20	Beyond the Mountains			Documentary		
A P R I L	20	Dude's Manual	Kevin Ko	Dong Zijian, Elane Zhong, Jessie Li	Comedy / Romance	Entered into the 2018 Beijing International Film Festival	
A P R I L	20	The Frozen Maze			Suspense / Thriller		
A P R I L	20	Path to the Dream			Drama / Action		
A P R I L	20	Sasha	Dong Chunze	Jiang Tao, Qian Dongni, Jun Sheng	Drama / Comedy / Romance		
A P R I L	20	The Taste of Rice Flower			Drama	Entered into the 74th Venice International Film Festival	
A P R I L	27	Snowfall			Drama		
A P R I L	28	A or B	Ren Pengyuan	Xu Zheng, Wang Likun, Wang Yanhui	Drama / Suspense / Crime	Entered into the 8th Beijing International Film Festival	
A P R I L	28	Genghis Khan	Hasi Chaolu	William Chan, Lin Yun, Hu Jun	Fantasy / Adventure		
A P R I L	28	Midnight XII			Horror / Terror		
A P R I L	28	Tomorrow Is Another Day	Chan Tai-lee	Teresa Mo, Ling Man-lung, Ray Lui	Drama	Mainland-Hong Kong co-production	
A P R I L	28	The Trough	Nick Cheung	Nick Cheung, Xu Jinglei, He Jiong, Yu Nan, Michael Miu	Drama / Action / Suspense / Crime	Mainland-Hong Kong co-production	
A P R I L	28	Us and Them	Rene Liu	Jing Boran, Zhou Dongyu, Tian Zhuangzhuang	Drama / Romance		
A P R I L	29	Screaming Live			Comedy		
M A Y	4	Hong Kong Rescue	Liu Yijun	Cheng Taishen, Yan Bingyan, Anson Leung	Drama / Action / Suspense / Adventure		
M A Y	11	The Dream			Drama		
M A Y	11	I Am Your Mom	Zhang Xiao	Yan Ni, Zou Yuanqing, Wu Ruofu	Drama / Comedy		
M A Y	11	House No.7			Comedy / Suspense / Thriller		
M A Y	11	Search for Goddess the Fairy Beauty			Romance / Suspense		
M A Y	11	You'll Never Walk Alone			Drama		
M A Y	12	Dear I Will Marry to Others	Qin Jie	Bao Jianfeng, Qi Yandi, Xu Yihan	Romance / Disaster		
M A Y	12	Princess and the Kingdom			Animation / Family / Adventure		
M A Y	13	The Parents in the World			Drama		
M A Y	16	Travel For Love			Drama / Romance		
M A Y	17	Walking Past the Future	Li Ruijun	Yang Zishan, Yin Fang, Li Qinqin	Drama	Mainland-Hong Kong co-production	
M A Y	18	Catch The King			Drama / Action		
M A Y	18	How Long Will I Love U	Su Lun	Lei Jiayin, Tong Liya, Zhang Yi	Comedy / Fantasy		
M A Y	18	The High Heels			Drama		
M A Y	18	The Lost Land			Drama / Comedy		
M A Y	25	A Spicy Detective	Sun Duo	Sun Xiaoxiao, Yu Weiwei, Sun Dandan	Drama / Adventure		
M A Y	25	Conspiracy			Suspense / Crime		
M A Y	25	End of Summer	Zhou Quan	Zhang Songwen, Tan Zhuo, Gu Bao-ming	Drama / Family	Entered into the 22nd Busan International Film Festival	
M A Y	25	Fate Express	Li Fei	Zhao Bingrui, Lü Xiaolin, Yu Ailei	Drama / Comedy / Crime	Entered into the 2015 First Youth Film Festival	
M A Y	25	The Secret Board			Comedy / Suspense / Costume		
M A Y	26	Counterespionage			Drama / Suspense / War		
M A Y	29	Eternal Love			Drama / Romance		
M A Y	29	To My 19-Year-Old	Huang Chao-liang	Austin Lin, Shi Anni, Wang Qian	Drama / Romance	Mainland-Hong Kong co-production	
J U N E	1	Damnation			Suspense / Thriller		
J U N E	1	Happy Little Submarine: 20000 Leagues Under the Sea			Animation / Fantasy / Adventure		
J U N E	1	Journey to the Snowing Mountains			Drama		
J U N E	1	Magic Mirror 2			Animation / Family / Adventure		
J U N E	4	Blue Goldfish	Tang Mingzhi	Ken Chu, Leni Lan, Qiufeng Qumuguhuo	Romance / Adventure		
J U N E	6	Underset			Drama / Suspense		
J U N E	8	A Paper Marriage			Drama / Romance		
J U N E	8	Ding Shang Xiao Tou De Zei			Comedy / Action		
J U N E	8	Happiness is Coming			Comedy		
J U N E	8	Horror Bathroom			Horror / Terror		
J U N E	8	Karma			Drama		
J U N E	8	Lumiere Amoureuse	Wan Lifang; Franchin Don	Samuel Mercer, Cyril Durel, Suzane Rault-balet, Michel Biel, Kimmy Tong	Romance / Fantasy	Mainland-France co-production	
J U N E	8	Love Originally			Drama / Romance		
J U N E	8	My Fading Childhood			Drama		
J U N E	8	The Universe of One’s Own	Yu Kang; Huang Jianye	Liang En, Tu Yuwei, Zhang Jiaxi	Drama / Action		
J U N E	15	Blood 13	Candy Li	Huang Lu, Xie Gang, Qian Bo	Drama / Suspense / Crime		
J U N E	15	The Cage of Time			Action / Romance / Suspense		
J U N E	15	The Family			Romance / Music / Drama		
J U N E	15	Meng Chong Guo Jiang	Xiaoshenyang	Xiaoshenyang, Pan Binlong, Vivian Sung	Comedy / Action		
J U N E	15	My Kitchen Lover	Yu Junhao	Kim Ki-bum, Xu Shendong, Yuen Wah	Comedy / Fantasy		
J U N E	15	This Year In Crazy	Ding Shijun	Richard Ng, Mimi Chu, Phong Tran	Drama / Comedy		
J U N E	16	A Genius Professor			Comedy / Romance		
J U N E	16	Foodiverse			Animation		
J U N E	21	Hello My Dog	Guo Dalei	Hao Lei, Liu Shuailiang, Pei Kuishan	Drama / Comedy		
J U N E	22	The Burns of Sin	Sun Jie	Johnny Zhang, Shi Yuqing, John Do	Drama / Suspense / Crime		
J U N E	22	Deadly Treasure	Feng Tiecheng	Yu Guoer, Wang Ke	Action / Romance / Adventure		
J U N E	22	Lobster Cop	Li Xinyun	Wang Qianyuan, Yuan Shanshan, Liu Hua	Comedy / Action / Crime		
J U N E	22	The Secret of Immortal Code	Li Wei; Zhang Nan	Liang Jing, Zhao Lixin, Landy Li	Suspense / Thriller		
J U N E	26	How Far Tomorrow			Drama		
J U N E	26	Malan Flower Blooms			Drama		
J U N E	29	Animal World	Han Yan	Li Yifeng, Michael Douglas, Zhou Dongyu	Drama / Action / Adventure	Entered into the 21st Shanghai International Film Festival	
J U N E	29	Escape Plan 2: Hades	Steven C. Miller	Sylvester Stallone, Huang Xiaoming, Dave Bautista	Action / Thriller	Mainland-United States co-production	
J U N E	29	Master of Oil Painting			Horror / Terror		
J U N E	29	Prince Vendetta			Comedy / Costume		
J U N E	29	True Love			Comedy / Romance		
J U N E	29	Underground Snatch			Drama / Comedy		
J U N E	29	The Unrepentant Youth			Drama / Comedy		
J U N E	30	Happy Planet: Tale of Boy 36			Science Fiction / Children		

=== July–September ===
Opening		Title	Director	Cast	Genre	Notes	Ref.
J U L Y	2	Soul Redemption			Romance / Suspense		
J U L Y	6	The Burns of Sin			Drama / Suspense / Crime		
J U L Y	6	Dying to Survive	Wen Muye	Xu Zheng, Wang Chuanjun, Zhang Yu, Tan Zhuo, Yang Xinming	Drama / Comedy		
J U L Y	6	New Happy Dad and Son 3: Adventure in Russia			Family / Children / Fantasy / Adventure		
J U L Y	6	Think Carefully			Horror / Terror		
J U L Y	8	The Red Shield Pioneer			Biography		
J U L Y	12	When Galsang Flowers Blood	Jiang Dawei	Zheng Lan, Dong Changjian, Yan Xu	Drama / Comedy / Romance		
J U L Y	13	Asura	Zhang Peng	Leo Wu, Tony Leung Ka-fai, Carina Lau	Action / Romance / Fantasy		
J U L Y	13	The Beautiful Lie			Children		
J U L Y	13	Hailongtun Tusi Fortress			Documentary		
J U L Y	13	Hidden Man	Jiang Wen	Eddie Peng, Liao Fan, Jiang Wen, Zhou Yun, Xu Qing	Drama / Comedy / Action		
J U L Y	13	Love of God			Music / Fantasy		
J U L Y	13	The Marionettes			Drama / Suspense		
J U L Y	14	Monkey King Reloaded			Comedy / Animation / Adventure	Mainland-Hong Kong co-production	
J U L Y	19	No Choice	Gao Jianguo	Fang Chengsong	Drama		
J U L Y	20	Beaties Battle			Drama / Comedy / Romance		
J U L Y	20	Chan Ke Nan Sheng			Drama / Romance		
J U L Y	20	House of The Rising Sons	Anthony Chan	Carlos Chan, Yu Tan, Jonathan Wong	Drama / Comedy	Mainland-Hong Kong co-production	
J U L Y	20	The Widowed Witch	Cai Chengjie	Tiffany Tian, Wen Xinyu	Drama	Entered into the 2017 FIRST International Film Festival	
J U L Y	24	Dan Jiang Kou Love			Comedy / Romance		
J U L Y	25	Trust Your Life With Me			Romance		
J U L Y	26	Nu Xiao Guai Tan			Horror		
J U L Y	27	Crystal Sky of Yesterday	Xi Chao		Romance / Animation		
J U L Y	27	Detective Dee: The Four Heavenly Kings	Tsui Hark	Mark Chao, Feng Shaofeng, Lin Gengxin, Ethan Juan, Carina Lau, Ma Sichun	Action / Suspense / Costume		
J U L Y	27	Hello Mr. Billionaire	Yan Fei; Peng Damo	Shen Teng, Vivian Sung, Zhang Yiming, Morning Chang, Chang Yuan	Comedy		
A U G U S T	1	Blood-Soaked Guang Chang			History / War		
A U G U S T	3	Reborn	Li Hailong	Han Geng, Rhydian Vaughan, Li Yuan	Comedy / Action / Crime		
A U G U S T	3	Shen Mi Shi Jie Li Xian Ji 4			Animation		
A U G U S T	3	Thirty That Year			Romance / Song and Dance		
A U G U S T	3	The Wind Guardians	Liu Kuo	Lu Zhixing, Yan Mengmeng, Chu Jun, Bian Jiang, Shan Xin	Animation / Fantasy		
A U G U S T	4	Flavors of Youth	Li Haoling; Yi Xiaoxing; Yoshitaka Takeuchi	Ban Taito, Kotobuki Minako	Animation	Beijing Joy Pictures & CoMix Wave Films	
A U G U S T	7	Truth or Dare			Comedy / Romance		
A U G U S T	10	Brave City			Comedy / Animation / Fantasy		
A U G U S T	10	Feng Men Bi Xian			Horror		
A U G U S T	10	iPartment	Frank Wei	Chen He, Lou Yixiao, Deng Jiajia, Sun Yizhou, Li Jiahang	Comedy / Romance	Film version of iPartment series	
A U G U S T	10	The Island	Huang Bo	Huang Bo, Shu Qi, Wang Baoqiang, Zhang Yixing, Yu Hewei	Comedy		
A U G U S T	10	The Meg	Jon Turteltaub	Jason Statham, Li Bingbing, Rainn Wilson	Action / Science Fiction / Thriller	Mainland-United States-Hong Kong co-production	
A U G U S T	15	Summer Flowers			Romance		
A U G U S T	17	Doggy Man			Comedy / Romance / Fantasy		
A U G U S T	17	Europe Raiders	Jingle Ma	Tony Leung Chiu-wai, Kris Wu, Tiffany Tang	Comedy / Action	Mainland-United Kingdom co-production	
A U G U S T	17	Go Brother!	Cheng Fenfen	Zhang Zifeng, Peng Yuchang, Zhao Jinmai	Comedy / Fantasy		
A U G U S T	17	Kungfood			Action / Animation / Adventure		
A U G U S T	17	The Last Stickman of Chongqing	He Ku		Documentary		
A U G U S T	17	Oolong Courtyard	Kevin Chu	Wang Ning, Kong Lianshun, Wang Zhi	Drama / Comedy / Action		
A U G U S T	17	The Sun Star Brigade			Drama		
A U G U S T	18	Travel! Frog in the Shallow Well			Animation / Fantasy / Adventure		
A U G U S T	20	Mr. Big			Documentary	Entered into the 2018 Beijing International Film Festival	
A U G U S T	21	Summer Adventure: Hey Monster!			Drama / Children / Fantasy		
A U G U S T	22	The Compact Density of Stone			Drama / Biography		
A U G U S T	24	Big Brother	Kam Ka-wai	Donnie Yen, Joe Chen, Yu Kang	Comedy / Action	Mainland-Hong Kong co-production	
A U G U S T	24	The Bravest Escort Group			Action / Costume		
A U G U S T	24	The Faithful			Drama / Biography / History	Entered into the 2018 Shanghai International Film Festival	
A U G U S T	24	Flowers in Full Bloom			Drama		
A U G U S T	24	Home Under the Sea			Comedy / Animation / Adventure		
A U G U S T	24	The Innocence of Childhood			Drama / Family / Children		
A U G U S T	24	Panic: Ghost Apartment			Suspense / Horror		
A U G U S T	24	Proud of Me	Lan Hongchun	Zheng Runqi, Li Shuhao, Chen Jinbiao	Drama / Comedy		
A U G U S T	25	Zhu Xian			Horror		
A U G U S T	28	Li Xuesheng			Drama / Biography		
A U G U S T	28	Yao Gun Xiao Zi			Drama / Children		
A U G U S T	30	Cao Cao and Yang Xiu			Drama	Entered into the 2018 Shanghai International Film Festival	
A U G U S T	31	Departures			Drama / Romance		
A U G U S T	31	Hidden Land in Northern Tibet			Documentary		
A U G U S T	31	Inside the Boys			Horror		
A U G U S T	31	The King of Football			Animation / Family / Adventure / Sports		
S E P T E M B E R	3	Goddesses in the Flames of War			Drama	Entered into the 2018 Shanghai International Film Festival	
S E P T E M B E R	7	The Blizzard	Jiang Kaiyang	Nie Yuan, Tan Kai, Xu Lu	Drama / Suspense / Crime		
S E P T E M B E R	7	The Dream of Nobody			Drama / Romance / Music / Crime		
S E P T E M B E R	7	Grass Ring			Drama / Romance		
S E P T E M B E R	7	The Kiss Addict	Li Yanning	Tan Zhuo, Chris Lee, Louis Sun	Drama / Romance		
S E P T E M B E R	7	Nightmare of Darkness			Suspense / Thriller / Horror		
S E P T E M B E R	7	The Secret of the River			Drama / Romance		
S E P T E M B E R	10	He is a Life Long Watcher			Drama	Entered into the 2012 Golden Rooster and Hundred Flowers Film Festival	
S E P T E M B E R	12	Winter in My Heart			Drama	Entered into the 2018 Shanghai International Film Festival	
S E P T E M B E R	14	The Road Not Taken	Tang Gaopeng	Wang Xuebing, Ma Yili, Zhu Gengyou	Drama / Crime	Entered into the 2018 Shanghai International Film Festival	
S E P T E M B E R	20	I Am a Prosecutor			Drama		
S E P T E M B E R	21	Ash Is Purest White	Jia Zhangke	Zhao Tao, Liao Fan, Xu Zheng	Romance / Crime	Entered into the 2018 Cannes Film Festival	
S E P T E M B E R	21	Blade of the Law			Action / Suspense / Crime		
S E P T E M B E R	21	Chan Ke Nan Sheng			Drama / Romance		
S E P T E M B E R	21	Cry Me a Sad River			Drama / Romance		
S E P T E M B E R	21	The Express			Horror		
S E P T E M B E R	21	Golden Job	Chin Ka-lok	Ekin Cheng, Jordan Chan, Michael Tse	Action / Crime	Mainland-Hong Kong co-production	
S E P T E M B E R	21	Guan! Guan! Ospreys'Merily Call			Suspense / Adventure		
S E P T E M B E R	21	How Willful of Grandpa & Grandson			Drama		
S E P T E M B E R	21	Ice Cream Lover			Comedy / Romance		
S E P T E M B E R	21	Imprisonment	Wu Qi	Wang Zhen, Pakho Chau, Robert Knepper	Suspense / Crime		
S E P T E M B E R	21	Lost Rainbow - The Return of Ancient Pendent			Drama		
S E P T E M B E R	21	Love in Pavilion City			Action / Romance		
S E P T E M B E R	21	Sky Rise			Drama		
S E P T E M B E R	21	Super Master & Disciple			Comedy / Action / Romance	Mainland-Malaysia co-production	
S E P T E M B E R	22	Monkey Magic			Comedy / Animation / Adventure		
S E P T E M B E R	30	Fat Buddies	Bao Bei'er	Wen Zhang, Bao Bei'er, Guo Jingfei	Comedy / Action		
S E P T E M B E R	30	Hello, Mrs. Money	Wu Yuhan	Huang Cailun, Allen, Song Yang	Comedy		
S E P T E M B E R	30	Legends of the Three Kingdoms			Action / Romance / Suspense / Fantasy		
S E P T E M B E R	30	Project Gutenberg	Felix Chong	Chow Yun-fat, Aaron Kwok, Zhang Jingchu, Feng Wenjuan, Liu Kai-chi	Action / Crime	Mainland-Hong Kong co-production	
S E P T E M B E R	30	Shadow	Zhang Yimou	Deng Chao, Sun Li, Zheng Kai, Wang Qianyuan, Wang Jingchun	Drama / Action / Costume	Entered into the 75th Venice International Film Festival	
S E P T E M B E R	30	Two Little Pigs Braved Mysterious Island			Animation / Kids / Adventure		
S E P T E M B E R	30	Year of the Dog	Liang Ting	Cheng Yi, Cui Yahan, Lam Suet	Comedy / Adventure		

=== October–December ===
Opening		Title	Director	Cast	Genre	Notes	Ref.
O C T O B E R	1	The Adventure of Afanti	Liu Wei	Hu Qian, Li Ye, Jiang Ke	Comedy / Animation		
O C T O B E R	1	Legend of the Ancient Sword	Renny Harlin	Leehom Wang, Victoria Song, Godfrey Gao, Archie Kao, Karena Ng	Action / Fantasy / Costume		
O C T O B E R	5	Jia Zhuang Bu Zheng Jing			Drama / Comedy / Family / Children / Fantasy		
O C T O B E R	5	Lost, Found	Lu Yue	Yao Chen, Ma Yili, Yuan Wenkang	Drama	Entered into the 2018 Shanghai International Film Festival	
O C T O B E R	12	Chinese Peacekeeping Forces			Drama / Action / War	Entered into the 2018 Shanghai International Film Festival	
O C T O B E R	12	Midnight Ghost			Suspense / Thriller / Horror		
O C T O B E R	12	Zhang Yimou's "Shadow"	Wang Peng	Zhang Yimou, Zhao Xiaoding, Chen Minzheng	Documentary		
O C T O B E R	13	Dino King			Comedy / Animation / Adventure		
O C T O B E R	15	Departure Alone The Sea			Drama / Family		
O C T O B E R	16	Let's Go			Drama / Comedy / Romance		
O C T O B E R	17	Leather Shoes			Drama		
O C T O B E R	19	Baby	Liu Jie	Yang Mi, Guo Jingfei, Lee Hong-chi	Drama	Entered into the 2018 Toronto International Film Festival	
O C T O B E R	19	Nightmare of Darkness			Suspense / Thriller / Horror		
O C T O B E R	19	Sun Flower			Drama	Entered into the 2018 Shanghai International Film Festival	
O C T O B E R	19	Super Model Fantasy	Frankie Chan	Patrick Tam, Jessey Meng, Kenneth Ma, Na Guangzi, Robin Luo	Action		
O C T O B E R	19	When Africa Meets You			Comedy / Action / Romance / Adventure		
O C T O B E R	26	Ala Changso	Sonthar Gyal	Yungdrung Gyal, Nyima Sungsung, Sechok Gyal	Drama	Entered into the 2018 Shanghai International Film Festival	
O C T O B E R	26	Crazy Little Thing	Kenji Wu	Kenji Wu, Zhou Yiran, Zhou Jianming	Comedy / Romance / Fantasy		
O C T O B E R	26	Crystal Sky of Yesterday	Xi Chao	Su Shangqing, Duan Yixuan, Wang Yibo	Romance / Animation		
O C T O B E R	26	Fake Lover			Comedy / Romance		
O C T O B E R	26	Kung Fu League	Jeffrey Lau	Vincent Zhao, Andy On, Danny Chan Kwok-kwan	Drama / Action		
O C T O B E R	26	Lumière Amoureuse			Romance / Fantasy	Mainland-France co-production	
O C T O B E R	26	The Secret Between Us					
O C T O B E R	26	Soul Contract			Horror		
O C T O B E R	27	Adventure in Time and Space			Animation / Family / Adventure		
O C T O B E R	31	Endless Loop	Wen He	Nie Yuan, Ge Tian, John Do	Suspense / Crime		
N O V E M B E R	2	Can't See Me Love You			Horror		
N O V E M B E R	2	The Code on the Fingertips			Action / Suspense / Adventure		
N O V E M B E R	2	Iceman II	Raymond Yip	Donnie Yen, Huang Shengyi, Wang Baoqiang, Simon Yam, Yu Kang	Action / Fantasy	Mainland-Hong Kong co-production	
N O V E M B E R	2	Obstetric Boys			Drama / Romance		
N O V E M B E R	2	The Sun Star Brigade			Drama		
N O V E M B E R	2	Tai Xian Mo Zhou			Suspense / Horror		
N O V E M B E R	2	You Beautify My Life			Love / Music / Song and Dance		
N O V E M B E R	3	Eight Immortals			Animation		
N O V E M B E R	9	Disturbed Souls on Campus			Horror		
N O V E M B E R	9	Dream Breaker	Han Yan	Chen Duling, Song Weilong, Zhang Youhao	Action / Adventure		
N O V E M B E R	9	In the Underground			Documentary	Entered into the 2015 Cinéma du Réel	
N O V E M B E R	9	Last Letter	Shunji Iwai	Zhou Xun, Qin Hao, Du Jiang, Zhang Zifeng, Deng Enxi	Drama / Romance		
N O V E M B E R	9	Legends of the Three Kingdoms	Lv Kejing	Ekin Cheng, Yu Rongguang, Michael Tse, Jia Qing, Jerry Lamb	Action / Romance / Suspense / Fantasy		
N O V E M B E R	9	Say Goodbye to Single			Comedy / Romance		
N O V E M B E R	10	Dino King			Comedy / Animation / Adventure		
N O V E M B E R	10	Pretty Princess			Animation / Children / Fantasy		
N O V E M B E R	15	Those Names Are Those Years			Drama		
N O V E M B E R	16	A Cool Fish	Rao Xiaozhi	Chen Jianbin, Ren Suxi, Pan Binlong	Drama / Comedy		
N O V E M B E R	16	A Smile from the Mountain			Drama		
N O V E M B E R	16	Binding Desting			Suspense / Horror		
N O V E M B E R	16	Capriccio of Tracking Down the Treasure			Comedy / Action		
N O V E M B E R	16	Lost in Mobius			Suspense / Horror		
N O V E M B E R	16	Source of Dreams	Liu Ke	Julian Chen, Yan Danchen, Li Yu	Suspense / Horror		
N O V E M B E R	20	Zhengzheng's World			Drama		
N O V E M B E R	21	Talkshow Legend			Drama / Biography		
N O V E M B E R	22	Destiny's Smile	Yang Datian	Henry Dong, Li Mincheng, Liu Yi	Drama / Romance		
N O V E M B E R	23	China Peacekeeping Forces	Ning Haiqiang	Xu Honghao, Yi Long, Peng Shiteng	Drama / Action / War	Entered into the 2018 Shanghai International Film Festival	
N O V E M B E R	23	The Express	Willie Ying	Leon Lee, Tang Jingmei, Shen Jianhong	Horror		
N O V E M B E R	23	Grandma's Home			Drama / Family		
N O V E M B E R	23	Save My Dogs	Zhang Fan	Liang Zai, Xiao Jin, Liu Xiaoye	Drama / Romance / Adventure		
N O V E M B E R	24	Super Kids' Attack			Comedy / Children		
N O V E M B E R	27	Hello Life	Cheng Gong; Ren Changzhen		Documentary		
N O V E M B E R	30	Er Shi Sui			Drama		
N O V E M B E R	30	Fake Partner	Lam Chi-chung; Ke Dingtu	Lam Chi-chung, Ai Xiaoqi, Benny Chan	Comedy		
N O V E M B E R	30	Fantastic Dream Trip			Comedy / Romance / Fantasy		
N O V E M B E R	30	Funeral Vigil			Horror	Entered into the 2017 Shanghai International Film Festival	
N O V E M B E R	30	Please Remember Me			Drama	Entered into the 2017 Pingyao International Film Festival	
N O V E M B E R	30	Route 33			Comedy / Romance		
N O V E M B E R	30	Save Your Soul			Drama		
N O V E M B E R	30	Waiting for Me in Heaven			Romance / Disaster		
D E C E M B E R	1	Adventure in Time and Space			Animation / Family / Adventure		
D E C E M B E R	1	Legend Second of the Tand Dynasty			Animation / Children		
D E C E M B E R	1	Life is a Belief	Xiao Han	Huang Zhongjian, Zhang Xuefei, A Hete	Documentary		
D E C E M B E R	6	Hope of Road			Drama		
D E C E M B E R	7	Better Man			Comedy / Romance		
D E C E M B E R	7	Einstein and Einstein	Cao Baoping	Zhang Xueying, Guo Jinglin, Zhi Yitong	Drama / Family	Entered into the 2013 Chinese Youth Image Forum	
D E C E M B E R	7	Left Hand and Right Hand			Drama / Romance		
D E C E M B E R	7	Love Afterlife			Romance / Suspense		
D E C E M B E R	7	The Pluto Moment	Zhang Ming	Wang Xuebing, Liu Dan, Miya Muqi	Drama	Entered into the 2018 Cannes Film Festival	
D E C E M B E R	8	Prequel of Orijia			Horror		
D E C E M B E R	11	Dawning	Xiong Wei	Rong Zishan, Guan Yajun, Ding Ning	Drama / Children / War		
D E C E M B E R	11	Who is the Bad Boy			Drama / Romance		
D E C E M B E R	12	Dr. Huang Danian			Drama / Biography		
D E C E M B E R	12	The Photographer	Zhang Wei	Xie Gang, Liu Mu, Kang Lei	Drama / History		
D E C E M B E R	13	Destiny and Dream			Drama / Romance		
D E C E M B E R	14	The Best Us			Drama		
D E C E M B E R	14	The First Time			Drama		
D E C E M B E R	14	The Golden Armed Brothers			Action / Romance / Martial Arts		
D E C E M B E R	14	Holding Hands			Drama		
D E C E M B E R	14	Painted Skin: The Double Mask			Horror		
D E C E M B E R	14	Running to the Spring			Drama		
D E C E M B E R	14	Second Child Coming			Drama / Comedy / Family		
D E C E M B E R	14	Stolen Fairytales			Comedy / Suspense		
D E C E M B E R	14	There Will Be Ample Time			Drama / Comedy		
D E C E M B E R	15	Kong Tian Zhan Dui Zhi Xing Shou Da Zhan			Animation / Adventure		
D E C E M B E R	17	Blue Amber	Zhou Jie	Wang Zhen, Lu Yulai, Geng Le	Drama / Suspense	Entered into the 2018 Shanghai International Film Festival	
D E C E M B E R	18	Fighting Men of China	Liu Yadang	Zhao Lixin, Ling Xiaosu, Jevon Wang	Drama		
D E C E M B E R	19	Patrolman Baoyin			Drama	Entered into the 2018 Pingyao International Film Festival	
D E C E M B E R	20	Spring Returns to My Homeland			Drama		
D E C E M B E R	21	Airpocalypse	Xiao Yang	Xiao Yang, Du Juan, Chang Yuan	Drama / Comedy / Fantasy		
D E C E M B E R	21	At Two Thirty			Suspense / Thriller / Horror		
D E C E M B E R	21	Father and Hero			Action / Suspense / Crime	Entered into the Shanghai International Film Festival	
D E C E M B E R	21	Master Z: The Ip Man Legacy	Yuen Woo-ping	Zhang Jin, Dave Bautista, Liu Yan, Michelle Yeoh, Tony Jaa	Action	Entered into the 23rd Busan International Film Festival	
D E C E M B E R	21	Reality TV Horror Incident			Thriller / Horror / Adventure		
D E C E M B E R	21	The Revenge of Phantom Knight			Drama / Suspense / Thriller		
D E C E M B E R	21	The Soul of Shui People in 1944			Romance / War		
D E C E M B E R	21	Kung Fu Monster	Andrew Lau	Louis Koo, Chen Xuedong, Bea Hayden, Bao Bei'er, Wang Taili	Action / Fantasy / Martial Arts	Mainland-Hong Kong co-production	
D E C E M B E R	22	The Connection			Drama		
D E C E M B E R	25	Romantic Crazy Double Seventh Day			Drama		
D E C E M B E R	27	A Promise Over 65 Years					
D E C E M B E R	28	The Sun Star Brigade			Drama		
D E C E M B E R	29	Kill Mobile	Yu Miao	Tong Dawei, Ma Li, Huo Siyan	Drama / Comedy		
D E C E M B E R	29	Midnight Ruins			Horror		
D E C E M B E R	29	Mojin: The Worm Valley	Fei Xing	Cai Heng, Gu Xuan, Yu Heng	Action / Fantasy / Adventure		
D E C E M B E R	29	The Morning After	Luo Deng	Ge You, Yue Yunpeng, Du Chun	Comedy / Adventure		
D E C E M B E R	30	Alibaba and The Three Golden Hair			Comedy / Animation / Adventure		
D E C E M B E R	30	Battle of Tortoise and Rabbit			Comedy / Animation / Adventure		
D E C E M B E R	30	Police Car Union			Animation / Adventure		
D E C E M B E R	30	Two Little Pigs Braved Mysterious Island			Animation / Kids / Adventure		
D E C E M B E R	31	Long Day's Journey into Night	Bi Gan	Tang Wei, Huang Jue, Sylvia Chang	Drama / Suspense	Entered into the 2018 Cannes Film Festival	

== See also ==
- List of Chinese films of 2017
- List of Chinese films of 2019
