= TGTM =

TGTM may refer to:

- Tamangic languages, a family of Sino-Tibetan languages spoken in the Himalayas of Nepal
- The Great Translation Movement, an internet movement that translates comments found in the Chinese internet
