= Great Translation Movement =

Chinese online movement

- Part of protest and dissent in China
- Date: Started February 2022; 4 years ago
- Type: Anti-censorship
- Theme: Internet activism
- Cause: Russian invasion of Ukraine
- Organised by: r/ChonglangTV

Chinese name
- Traditional Chinese: 大翻譯運動
- Simplified Chinese: 大翻译运动
Transcriptions
Standard Mandarin
- Hanyu Pinyin: Dà Fānyì Yùndòng
- Bopomofo: ㄉㄚˋㄈㄢ ㄧˋㄩㄣˋㄉㄨㄥˋ

The Great Translation Movement is a Twitter account launched in 2022 during the Russian invasion of Ukraine. It seeks to document displays of ultranationalist, pro-Russian and anti-Western sentiment in the People's Republic of China (PRC) by translating comments found in the country's Internet. The languages it has translated to include English, Japanese, Korean, and Spanish. The Guardian observed that the Great Translation Movement (GTM) has been a source for English-language speakers to understand the Chinese Communist Party (CCP) and Chinese state media's reaction towards the Russian invasion of Ukraine, although experts cautioned seeing the posts as representative of the Chinese public's views, citing China's highly censored media environment and personal biases within GTM. Others have pointed out that translated nationalist content can paint an overly simplistic picture and runs the risk of conflating the Chinese public with the CCP. Chinese state media have been highly critical of GTM and said that it is part of a propaganda campaign by "hostile foreign forces" against the country. Despite primarily focusing on posts from within PRC-controlled internet spaces, GTM has also translated posts from Taiwanese politicians.

== History ==
=== Establishment on Reddit (February 24–March 2) ===
The Great Translation Movement originated on several Chinese-language subreddits. Giving a reason for its founding, a GTM participant said in an interview that he hoped that "people in more countries realize that Chinese people are not 'warm, hospitable, and gentle' as the CCP's foreign propaganda declares, but instead are a collective that is proud, arrogant, vigorously in love with populism, cruel, bloodthirsty, and completely lacking in sympathy." (希望能够让更多国家的人明白，中国人并不是和中共大外宣当中的形象一样'热情，好客，温良'，而是骄傲，自大，民粹主义兴盛，残忍，嗜血，毫无同情心的集合体). In an interview with the Business Insider, it stated that it aimed to criticize the "banal evil of the Chinese people". Participants called for commentary that supported the Russian invasion of Ukraine on the Chinese internet to be translated and disseminated on foreign social media platforms. GTM called for monetary support for the Ukrainian people. Within the first week of its establishment, donations made publicly by the organizers on Reddit reached approximately $10,000.

=== Reddit ban and shift to other platforms (March 2–March 8) ===
On March 2, one of the subreddits originally organizing GTM, r/ChonglangTV was shut down by Reddit for "exposing privacy of others." The ban was in response to the doxing of a Weibo user who claimed to block the remittance of money to Ukraine. The Great Translation Movement then moved to other platforms such as Twitter and Pincong. On March 19, Pincong employees were detained by the Chinese government after starting a channel for the GTM on Pincong's home page.

In addition to posts from mainland China, it has targeted posts from Taiwanese politicians, such as a post from former Kuomintang chairwoman Hung Hsiu-chu, who made comments in support of China's policies in Xinjiang, specifically denying any forced labor, following a visit to the region.

== Reactions ==
=== Overseas Chinese ===
==== Positive ====
Political scholar and dissident Cai Xia, a former professor at the Central Party School of the Chinese Communist Party, expressed support for GTM. She made the following comment:

...This translation not only exposes the CCP's totalitarian ideology that poisons the Chinese people, ...it also reminds global governments and people to be wary of the infiltration and poisoning of the CCP's external propaganda, false information, false narratives, and misleading public opinion space.

Some Chinese dissidents have expressed support for GTM because it creates "a dilemma for Chinese censorship authorities." Censoring extremist or disturbing content written by Chinese nationalists could alienate CCP supporters, but not censoring such content ends up constituting tacit approval.

According to Xiao Qiang of the UC Berkeley Graduate School of Journalism, the Great Translation Movement "disrupted the Chinese government's communication machine...[t]hat's why it's so upset."

==== Negative ====
Criticisms of the GTM on Chinese-language WeChat boards contend that it will intensify xenophobia and racism against Asian Americans. Furthermore, Deutsche Welle also noted that misogynistic comments about Ukrainian women were not just limited to mainland China, but Taiwan as well, with some Chinese officials even accusing "Taiwanese separatists" of pretending to be mainland Chinese while posting such comments.

When asked about these concerns, a representative responded that they were not concerned about the potential increase in anti-Asian attacks, saying "People in the civilized world possess logical thinking abilities and will distinguish between individuals and groups. As long as our individual behavior demonstrates a high level of civility, people from other countries will be very willing to interact with us."

Altman Yuzhu Peng, an associate professor at the University of Warwick, described GTM as "activist journalism" and noted its "potential to incite anti-Chinese racism on X by portraying grassroots pro-regime actors as representative of the entire Chinese population."

==== Mixed ====
Han Yang, a former Chinese diplomat who now supports the Great Translation Movement, has stated that he disagrees with the desire of some members of GTM to paint the Chinese people as cruel and bloodthirsty, which he believes helps Chinese state-run media discredit it.

=== Chinese government and state media ===
Chinese state media criticized GTM and described it as "cherry picked content". The Global Times, a tabloid owned by the People's Daily, claimed that GTM is "a farce" created by the 1450 Internet army and backed by western media such as Voice of America that is selectively translating extreme commentary from the Chinese internet, and accused it of "smearing China" and of "anti-China bias".

An op-ed published by The Paper, an online newspaper run by the state-owned Shanghai United Media Group, described GTM as part of an "Anti-China Propaganda War".

Tang Jingtai, a professor at Fudan University School of Journalism, wrote in Sixth Tone, an online magazine run by the Shanghai United Media Group, that the rising of attention to posts in Chinese social media celebrating the assassination of Japanese Prime Minister Shinzo Abe, and that while the translated posts may not represent the views of the greater Chinese public, they were indeed authentic, and compared it to a global trend of increased online extremist rhetoric. Tang said that GTM was increasing prejudice against Chinese people by positioning itself as a "hall monitor" for online speech. He argued that GTM had more in common with the hateful rhetoric it claimed to expose and stated, "it is a shame to see translation used as a tool to divide, rather than unite."

=== Others ===
Experts warned against taking the translations the group publishes as representative of public opinion. CNN noted that media experts cautioned that "the posts do not show a holistic view of public opinion in China and appear to at least partially be selected for shock value -- but could still be useful in bringing these elements of China's media sphere to light." They also noted the group's own biases, such as its comparisons of China with Nazi Germany. CNN further noted that Chinese platforms sometimes censored ultranationalist voices, and that while nationalist rhetoric in China increased, that "the loudest voices may not show a majority." David Bandurski, director of the China Media Project, said that while the account has been important in highlighting state media voices, the content should not be taken as representative of the Chinese public, giving a comparison about taking ultraconservative voices in the US media as representative of the US perspective. Maria Repnikova of Georgia State University explained that while there is an information gap between China and the West, that the movement was "picking very provocative posts, which are attention-grabbing."

== See also ==
- China and the Russian invasion of Ukraine
- Jixian Wang
- Milk Tea Alliance
- Middle East Media Research Institute
- NAFO (group)
