= Blood 13 =

- Directed by: Li Lingcong
- Written by: Tu Hu
- Release dates: April 18, 2018 (Beijing); June 15, 2018 (China)
- Running time: 99 minutes
- Country: China
- Language: Chinese

Blood 13 is a Chinese police procedural film that follows the story of two police officers as they track a serial killer.

== Plot ==
The film follows policewoman Xing Min (played by Lu Huang) who partners with veteran policeman Old Zhou (played by Gang Xie) in the investigation of a murderer that is in the midst of targeting prostitutes in a killing spree, after they determine that the deaths are tied to the same serial killer that Old Zhuo has been tracking for fifteen years. Their plot to catch the killer sees Xing Min posing as bait for their next victim, while struggling with her own prejudice against women engaged in prostitution.

== Production ==
Blood 13 was directed by Li Lingcong (Candy Li) with an international crew, and the director of photography for the film was Haga Hiroyuki. The screenplay was written by Tu Hu. The film premiered at the 8th Beijing International Film Festival on April 18, 2018, and was wide-released in China on June 15, 2018. It was released digitally in North American in August 2019.
