= The Testament (2017 film) =

2017 Israeli film

The Testament (Hebrew: העדות) is a 2017 Israeli-Austrian film directed by Amichai Greenberg. It is a story of a legal battle of a Jewish historian with Austrian authorities not willing to recognize a murder of 200 Jewish forced laborers in 1945.

The film is based on the real case of Rechnitz Massacre. The name of the city was changed to the fictional one, Lendsdorf.

== Awards ==
- Best Israeli Film Award - 34th Haifa International Film Festival
- Best screenplay at the 8th Beijing International Film Festival
- Best narrative feature at the Atlanta Jewish Film Festival
