= 2016 Shanghai International Film Festival =

Chinese film festival

- Location: Shanghai, China
- Awards: Golden Goblet
- No. of films: more than 200
- Website: http://www.siff.com

Shanghai International Film Festival chronology
- 2017 2015

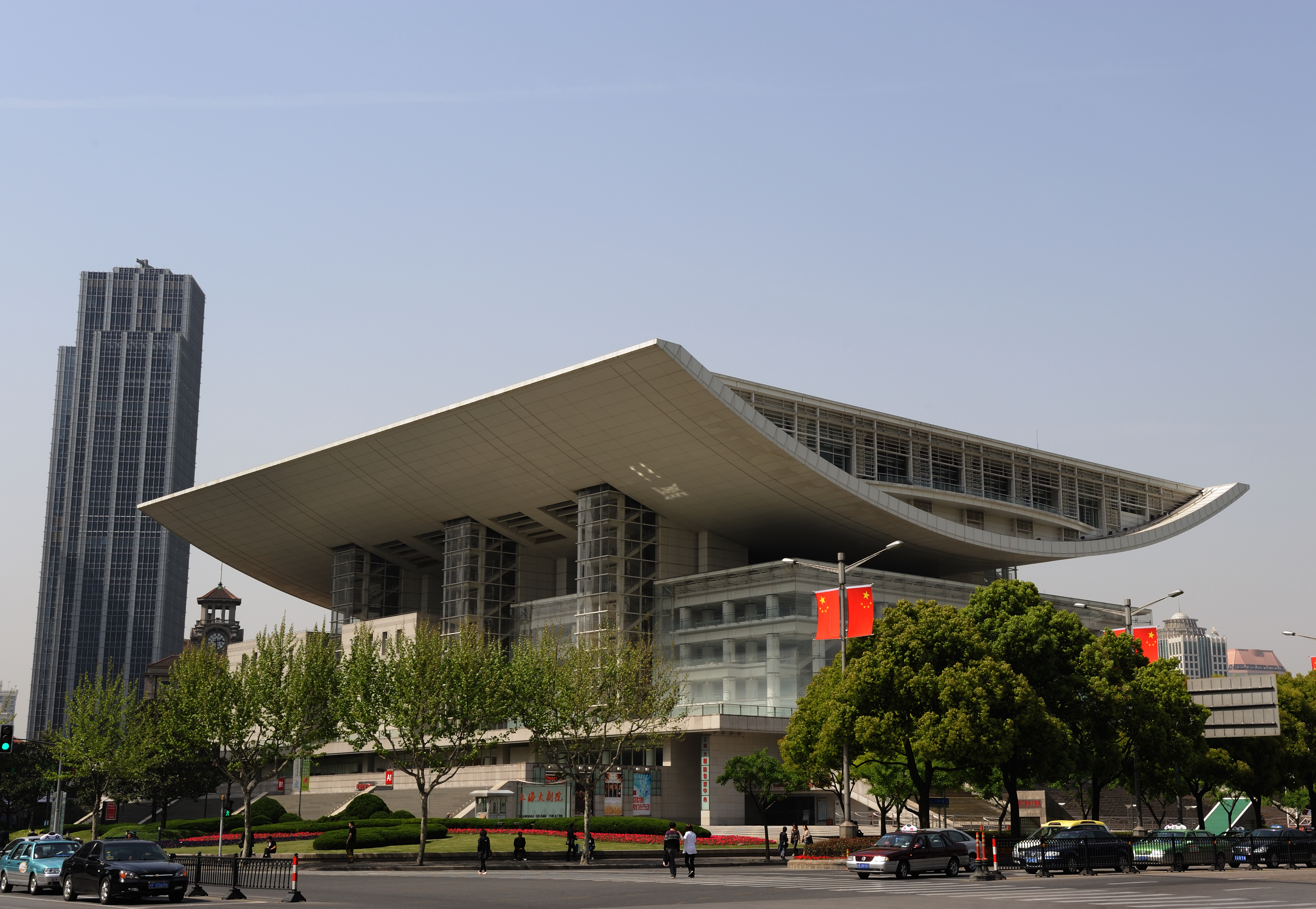
Shanghai Grand Theater

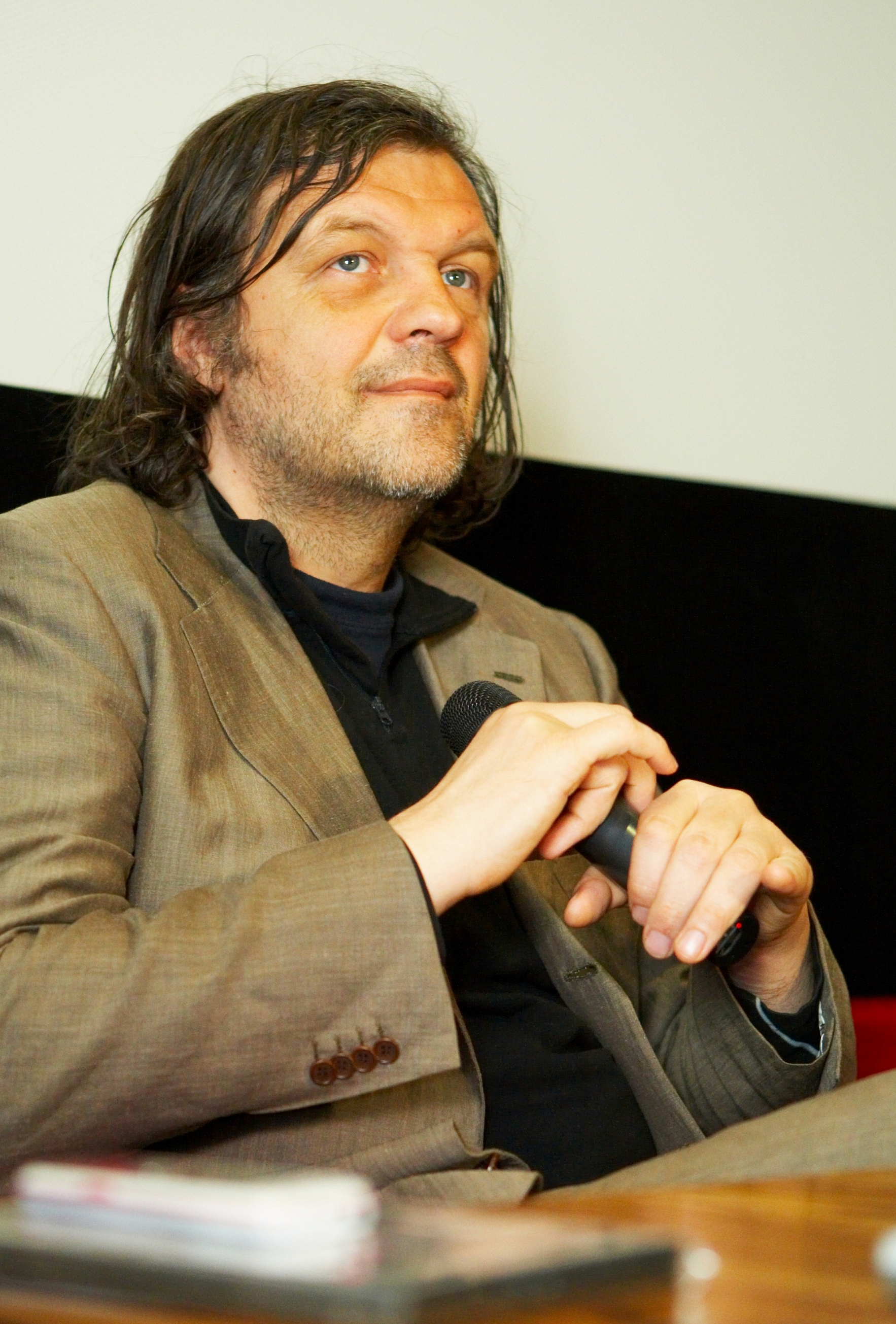
Emir Kusturica, president of the jury for the Golden Goblet Award

The 2016 Shanghai International Film Festival was the 19th such festival devoted to international cinema held in Shanghai, China.

== International Jury ==
The members of the jury for the Golden Goblet Award were:

- Emir Kusturica (Serbian director, musician, actor, producer, writer and architect)
- Atom Egoyan (Canadian director)
- Daniele Luchetti (Italian director)
- Karena Lam (Chinese HK actress)
- Pema Tseden (Chinese director, screenwriter)
- Abderrahmane Sissako (Mauritanian director, producer)
- Yan Geling (Chinese American novelist, screenwriter)

== In Competition ==
English title	Director(s)	Production country
Cock and Bull	Cao Baoping	China
De Lan	Liu Jie	China
Flowers of Evil	Antti Jokinen	Finland
Forest, 4 am	Jan Jakub Kolski	Poland
Hanna's Sleeping Dogs	Andreas Gruber	Germany/Austria
HAZE	Ralston Jover	Philippines
Hear the Silence	Ed Ehrenberg	Germany/Poland
In Embryo	Ulrich Thomsen	Denmark/USA
Mr. Church	Bruce Beresford	USA
The Projects	Junji Sakamoto	Japan
Salt and Fire	Werner Herzog	Germany/France/USA
See You in Texas	Vito Palmieri	Italy
Soul on a String	Zhang Yang	China
Sound and Fury	Houman Seyedi	Iran

== Winners ==
=== Golden Goblet Awards ===
- Best Feature Film: De Lan by Liu Jie
- Jury Grand Prix: See You in Texas by Vito Palmieri
- Best Director: Antti Jokinen for Flowers of Evil
- Best Actor: Liu Ye for Cock and Bull
- Best Actress: Naomi Fujiyama for The Projects
- Best Screenplay: Andreas Gruber for Hanna's Sleeping Dogs
- Best Cinematography: Guo Daming for Soul on a String
- Artistic Contribution: HAZE by Ralston Jover

=== Asian New Talent Award ===
- Best Film: Thithi
- Best Director: Jacob Chen for Lost Daughter
- Best Scriptwriter: Thithi
- Best Actor: Qin Yong for Nirvana
- Best Actress: Sun Yi for Pleasure. Love.
- Best Cinematography: The Island Funeral

=== China Movie Channel Media Award ===
(Note: Actual naming convention per category is "Film that attracted the most media attention" rather than "Best Film", but both essentially share the same meaning)

- Best Film: The Song of Cotton
- Best Director: Larry Yang for Mountain Cry
- Best Scriptwriter: Larry Yang for Mountain Cry
- Best Actor: Wallace Chung for Three
- Best Actress: Yan Bingyan for The Song of Cotton
- Best Supporting Actor: Tengger for For a Few Bullets
- Best Supporting Actress: Ai Liya for The Song of Cotton
- Best New Director: Zhu Yuancheng for The Song of Cotton
- Best New Actor: Austin Lin for At Cafe 6
- Best New Actress: Cherry Ngan for At Cafe 6
- Media's Anticipated Films: The Dead End, Mr. Six, Xuanzang
- Media's Anticipated Newcomer of the Year: Kris Wu
- Media's Anticipated Actor of the Year: Nicholas Tse
- Special Jury Award: Farewell My Concubine

=== Jackie Chan Action Movie Awards ===
- Best Action Movie: Ip Man 3 (Hong Kong)
- Best Action Movie Director: Wilson Yip for Ip Man 3 (Hong Kong)
- Best Action Choreographer: Jon DeVore for Point Break (United States)
- Best Action Movie Actor: Owen Wilson for No Escape (United States)
- Best Action Movie Actress: Zhang Jingchu for For a Few Bullets (China)
- Best Action Movie New Performer: Han Sang-hyuk for Chasing (South Korea)
- Best Special Effects: Jeb Corliss for Point Break (United States)
- Best Fight: Ip Man 3 (Hong Kong)
