= Sky Hunter =

- Simplified Chinese: 空天猎
- Directed by: Li Chen
- Written by: Chen Li; Zhang Li
- Produced by: Lu Jianmin
- Starring: Li Chen; Fan Bingbing; Wang Qianyuan; Li Jiahang; Leon Lee; Guo Mingyu; Ye Liu
- Cinematography: Danny Chen
- Music by: Andrew Kawczynski
- Production company: Spring Era Films
- Release date: 29 September 2017
- Country: China
- Languages: Mandarin; English
- Budget: CN¥200 million
- Box office: CN¥317.28 million

Sky Hunter is a Chinese war film directed by Li Chen. It is Li's directorial debut. The film is produced in collaboration with the People's Liberation Army Air Force and is China's first aerial warfare film. It was released on 29 September 2017.

== Synopsis ==
The plot centers on an elite group of Chinese soldiers whose mission is to thwart a terrorist plot and to resolve a hostage crisis.

== Cast ==
- Li Chen
- Fan Bingbing
- Wang Qianyuan
- Li Jiahang
- Leon Lee
- Guo Mingyu
- Ye Liu
- Wu Xiubo
- Wang Xueqi
- AJ Donnelly

== Production ==
The film had the full support of the People's Liberation Army Air Force (PLAAF), with it being the first time that a film crew was allowed access to the military bases by the People's Liberation Army Air Force for shooting. Military experts and trainers served as advisers for the movie's script, which was primarily written by air force Lieutenant Colonel Zhang Li.

=== Filming ===
The film features various front line combat aircraft, including the Y-20 airlifter, the J-20 stealth fighter, the J-11, the H-6, and the J-10 multirole combat aircraft. Scenes were shot in various parts of China and Kazakhstan.

=== Casting ===
Director Li’s then-girlfriend and top Chinese actress Fan Bingbing was cast as the female lead, playing a PLA pilot. Fan reportedly received no wage for her appearance.

=== Music ===
The score was composed by Andrew Kawczynski and recorded at Synchron Stage Vienna in Austria. Hans Zimmer served as the executive music producer. Chinese singer and actor Lu Han lent his vocals for the film's ending theme song "Chasing Dream With Childlike Heart".

== Awards and nominations ==
Year	Award	Category	Recipients	Result	Ref.
2018	9th China Film Director's Guild Awards	Best Film	Sky Hunter	Nominated	
2018	9th China Film Director's Guild Awards	Best Director	Li Chen	Nominated	
2018	23rd Huading Awards	Best Director	Li Chen	Nominated	
2018	23rd Huading Awards	Best New Director	Li Chen	Won	
2018	25th Beijing College Student Film Festival	Students' Choice Award for Favorite Director	Li Chen	Won	
