= Jixian Wang =

Chinese video blogger in Ukraine

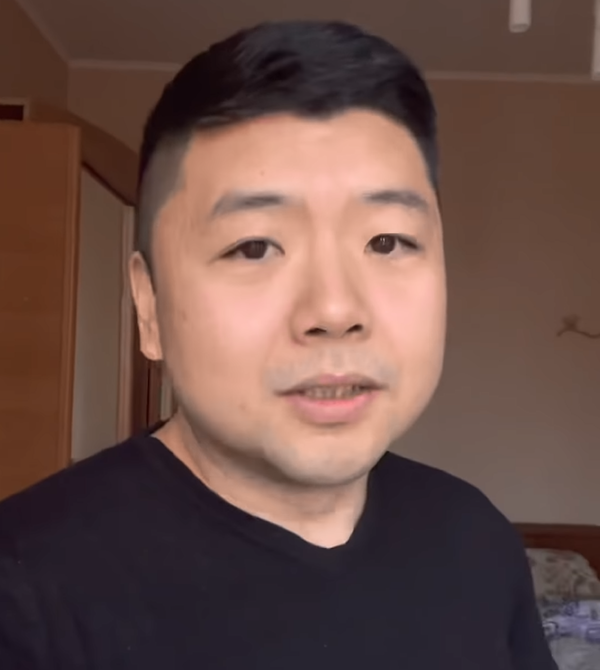
- Wang in 2022
- Born: 3 April 1985 (age 41); Beijing, China

Jixian Wang (simplified Chinese: 王吉贤; traditional Chinese: 王吉賢; pinyin: Wáng Jíxián; born 3 April 1985) is a Chinese programmer living in Ukraine who is known for video blogging his war experiences during the Russian invasion of Ukraine. Wang's account of events, intended for Sinophone audiences, differ from how they are portrayed by state media in China. His content has been targeted by censors. His WeChat was suspended following interviews with several media outlets in March 2022, and he was briefly cut off from his family in China. Wang was temporarily suspended from YouTube over reports of inciting violence because of his documentation of war footage.

Wang was arrested by the Ukrainian authorities in October 2023 for filming and publicly broadcasting information about Ukrainian air defense systems in Odesa, including the location, time and targets hit. He was released from custody in November 2023 and originally sentenced the following month to 5 years in prison, which was suspended and reduced to one year in probation after taking into account his lack of prior criminal history and legal presence in Ukraine. Afterwards, he announced on Twitter that he would no longer upload war-related or political content and that he still supported Ukraine.

Wang has lived outside of China since 2017, having previously resided in Skopje, North Macedonia. He works for RegDesk, a U.S.-based AI company and had moved to Ukraine in July 2021 as part of a work-related transfer.

== See also ==
- Great Translation Movement
- China and the Russian invasion of Ukraine
