= Pincong =

Chinese Internet forum

Pincong (2018–)
- Website type: Q & A Political Internet forum
- Available in: Chinese
- Website: pincong.rocks h.pincong.rocks
- Commercial: No
- Registration: Optional
- Launched: November 2018; 7 years ago
- Current status: Operating

Pincong
- Traditional Chinese: 品蔥
- Simplified Chinese: 品葱
- Literal meaning: Tasting of onion
Transcriptions
Standard Mandarin
- Hanyu Pinyin: pǐn cōng
- Bopomofo: ㄆㄧㄣˇ ㄘㄨㄥ
Yue: Cantonese
- Jyutping: ban^{2} cung^{1}

Pincong (Chinese: 品蔥) is a Chinese-language internet forum and Q&A website primarily used to discuss politics and adjacent topics. Its users are mainly overseas Chinese people. The "old Pincong" was founded in 2017, but closed down on 30 October 2018. A new team launched "new Pincong" shortly after.

== Background ==
Pincong's server is located in United States. The site is currently blocked by the Great Firewall of Mainland China.

According to Quartz, Pincong is popular among China’s liberals. Some of its users come from Douban.

== Influence ==
- November 13, 2019, many users from mainland China uploaded their student photo IDs or diploma, partially covered by a piece of paper to anonymously support Hong Kong protests.
- November 30, 2019, a Pincong user published "Geng Shuang Emulator" on GitHub, a webapp that emulates the clichéd speech of then-Chinese Foreign Ministry Spokesperson Geng Shuang. It randomly rearranges Geng Shuang's speeches, with keywords replaced to produce a new speech. That attracted some attention of political activists from Hong Kong and Taiwan. The emulator was removed on December 30.

== See also ==
- LIHKG
- HK Golden
- PTT Bulletin Board System
- Internet censorship circumvention
- Utopia (internet forum)
