= Genghis Khan (2018 film) =

- Chinese: 战神纪
- Directed by: Chaolu Hasi
- Written by: Zhuo Gehe
- Produced by: Alata; Gang Chen; Xingwang Hai; Chaolu Hasi; Hong Ling; Wenbin Wu
- Starring: William Chan; Lin Yun; Hu Jun; Ba Sen
- Cinematography: Shu Yang
- Edited by: Yongyi Li
- Release date: 28 April 2018
- Running time: 119 minutes
- Country: China
- Language: Mandarin

Genghis Khan (Chinese: 战神纪) is a Chinese historical / fantasy epic film produced by Jean-Jacques Annaud and directed by Hasi Chaolu. It stars William Chan as the titular Genghis Khan. The film, originally slated to be released in China on December 22, 2017, was subsequently postponed to April 28, 2018 to allow the team more time for post-production work. The film was also the closing film at the 8th Beijing International Film Festival.

== Synopsis ==
Temüjin and Börte are childhood lovers who are deeply in love; but news of Temüjin's father's death swiftly disrupted their relationship. Temüjin heads back to his hometown, but was faced with a sudden attack from his father's former comrades, causing his whole tribe to be destroyed.

== Cast ==
- William Chan as Temüjin
- Lin Yun as Börte
- Hu Jun as Kuchlug
- Ba Sen
- Zhao Lixin
- Ni Dahong
- Li Guangjie as Jamukha
- Zhang Xinyi
- Tu Men as Jamukha's father
- Li Shengda
- Bayin
- Yong Mei as Hoelun

== Original soundtrack ==
Song Category	Song Name	Singer	Lyricists	Composer	Notes
Promotion song	God of War	Wowkie Zhang	Lin Qiao	Bernd Meinunger	
