= Hasi Chaolu =

Chinese-Mongolian film director (born 1966)

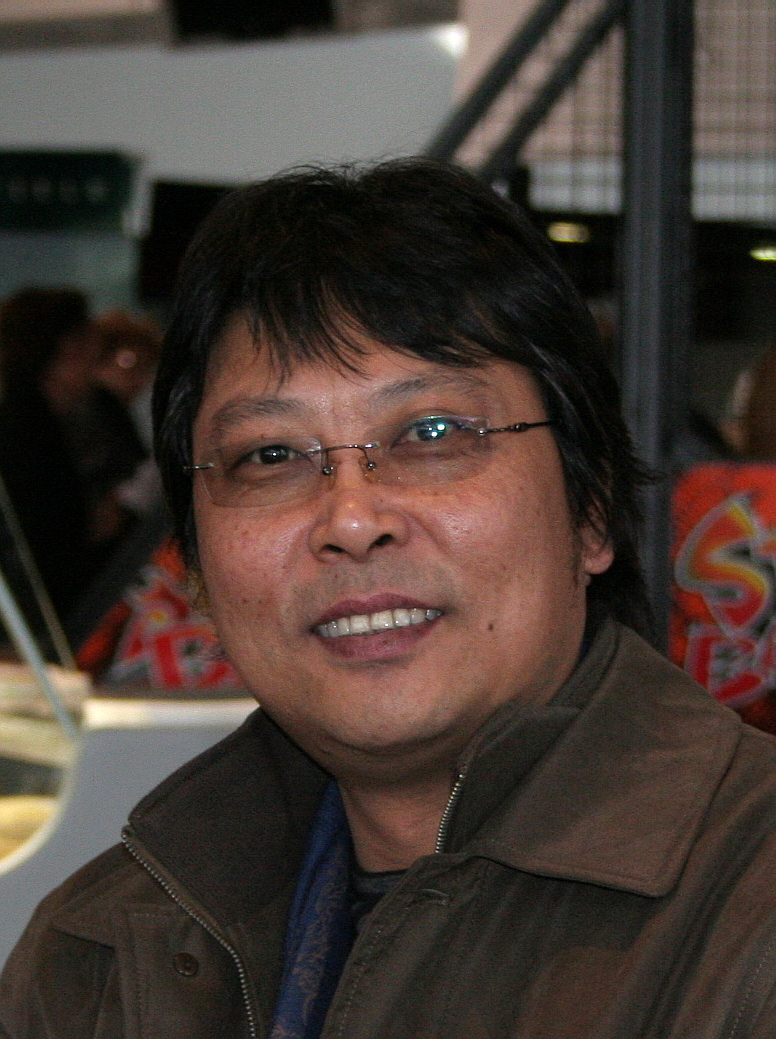
- Born: China
- Occupation: Film director

Hasi Chaolu is a Chinese-Mongolian film director.

== Career ==
His 2006 film The Old Barber won Golden Peacock Award at IFFI (2006), and Best Film award at Pune International Film Festival (2007). His 2018 film Genghis Khan was premiered at 8th Beijing International Film Festival.

== Selected filmography ==
- Genghis Khan (2018)
- The Old Barber (2006)

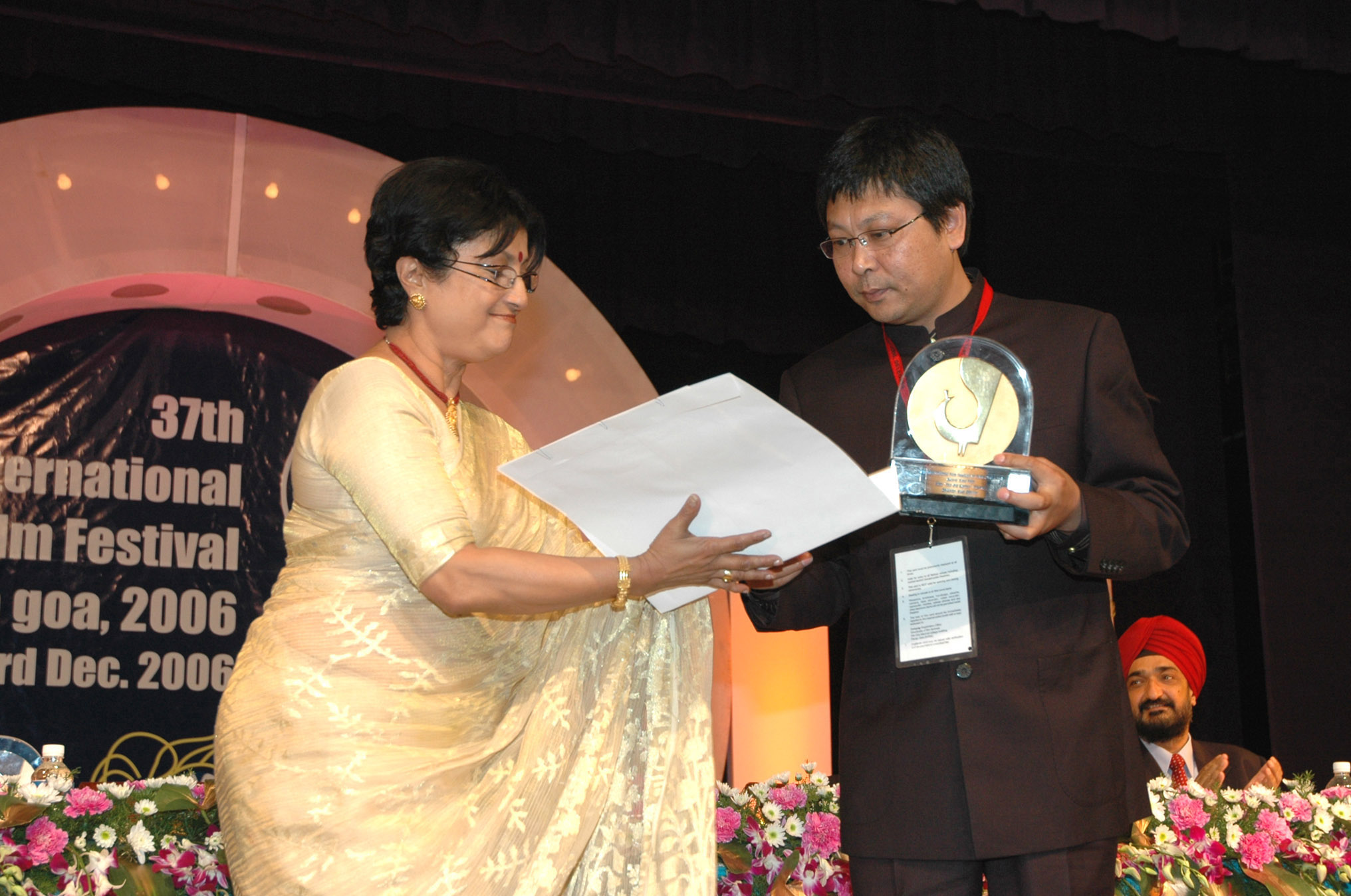
Hasi Chaolu (right) receiving Golden Peacock Award from Indian director Aparna Sen (left), for the film The Old Barber at 37th International Film Festival of India (Goa) in 2006
