= Ding Lin =

Chinese geologist

- 丁林
- Born: July 1965 (age 61); Xiao County, Anhui, China
- Education: Peking University
- Scientific career
- Fields: Geology
- Workplaces: Institute of Tibet Plateau Research, Chinese Academy of Sciences

Ding Lin (Chinese: 丁林; pinyin: Dīng Lín; born July 1965) is a Chinese geologist and an academician of the Chinese Academy of Sciences (CAS).

== Biography ==
Ding was born in Xiao County, Anhui in July 1965. In 1988 he graduated from Peking University, earning his bachelor degree in structure and Geomechanics. He received his master's degree and doctor's degree in structural geology from the Institute of Geology, Chinese Academy of Sciences (CAS) in 1991 and 1999 respectively. In 1995 he became an associate research fellow at the CAS Institute of Geology. In 2003 he became a research follow at the Institute of Tibet Plateau Research of the CAS.

== Honours and awards ==
- 2017 Academician of the Chinese Academy of Sciences (CAS)
