= 8th Beijing International Film Festival =

Film festival in Beijing China in 2018

- Official poster
- Opening film: A or B by Ren Pengyuan
- Closing film: Genghis Khan by Hasi Chaolu
- Location: Beijing, China
- Founded: 2011
- Awards: Tiantan Award; Best Feature Film: Scary Mother by Ana Urushadze; Best Director: Mariam Khatchvani for Dede
- Hosted by: China Film Administration; Beijing Municipal Government; China Media Group
- Festival date: Opening: April 15, 2018; Closing: April 22, 2018
- Website: 8th BJIFF

Beijing International Film Festival
- 9th 7th

The 8th Beijing International Film Festival (simplified Chinese: 第8届北京国际电影节; traditional Chinese: 第8屆北京國際電影節) was held in Beijing, China by the Beijing Municipal Government and the China Media Group. The film festival opened on April 15 and lasted until April 22, 2018. The closing ceremony was held in Beijing on April 22, 2018.

The opening film was Ren Pengyuan's drama film A or B and the closing night film was Mongolian-Chinese director Hasi Chaolu's action film Genghis Khan.

The Festival threw the spotlight on LGBT rights in China when Chinese Government censors banned the screening of the Oscar-winning Call Me by Your Name, amid growing censorship concerns under the rule of Xi Jinping.

== International Jury ==
The members of the jury for the Tiantan Award were:

- Wong Kar-wai (Hong Kong film director)
- Rob Cohen (American film director)
- Duan Yihong (Chinese actor)
- Jan A. P. Kaczmarek (Polish composer)
- Călin Peter Netzer (Romanian film director)
- Ruben Östlund (Swedish film director)
- Shu Qi (Taiwanese actress)

== In Competition ==
The Tiantan Awards (天坛奖) are the highest awards at the festival, which 659 films from 71 countries and regions have entered. A total of 15 films have been shortlisted for the Tiantan Awards.

| English title | Chinese title | Director(s) | Production area |
|---|---|---|---|
| Operation Red Sea | 红海行动 | Dante Lam | China |
| Hold Your Hands | 十八洞村 | Miao Yue | China |
| Po strništi bos | 赤足 | Jan Svěrák | Czech Republic |
| Kadvi Hawa | 黑暗之风 | Nila Madhab Panda | India |
| Dede | 妈妈 | Mariam Khatchvani | Georgia |
| Dog | 狗 | Samuel Benchetrit | France |
| Eye on Juliet | 目视朱丽叶 | Kim Nguyen | Canada |
| Journey's End | 旅程尽头 | Saul Dibb | United Kingdom |
| Krotoa | 克洛多娃 | Roberta Durrant | South Africa |
| Octave | 奥克塔夫 | Serge loan Celebidachi | Romania |
| Scary Mother | 惊慌妈妈 | Ana Urushadze | Georgia |
| Searing Summer | 灼热之夏 | Ebrahim Irajzad | Iran |
| The Other Side of Hope | 希望的另一面 | Aki Kaurismäki | Finland |
| The Testament | 谎言 | Amichai Greenberg | Israel Austria |
| Untaken Paths | 未来之路 | Tahmineh Milani | Iran |

== Winners of Tiantan Awards ==
| Category | Winner(s) | Notes |
|---|---|---|
| Best Feature Film | Scary Mother | |
| Best Director | Mariam Khatchvani, Dede | |
| Best Actor | Joe Cole, Eye on Juliet | |
| Best Actress | Nata Murvanidze, Scary Mother | |
| Best Supporting Actor | Paul Bettany, Journey's End | |
| Best Supporting Actress | Mina Sadati, Searing Summer | |
| Best Screenplay | Amichai Greenberg, The Testament | |
| Best Cinematography | Konstantin Esadze, Dede | |
| Best Music | Hildur Guðnadóttir/Natalie Holt, Journey's End | |
| Best Visual Effects | Lee In Ho/Kang Tae Gyun/Yee Kwok Leung/Lin Chun Yue (Jules)/Ma Siu Fu/Thomas Lautenbach/Gareth Frederick Repton, Operation Red Sea | |

== See also ==
- 11th Beijing International Film Festival
