= 2017 Shanghai International Film Festival =

Chinese film festival

- Location: Shanghai, China
- Awards: Golden Goblet
- No. of films: more than 200
- Website: http://www.siff.com

Shanghai International Film Festival chronology
- 2018 2015

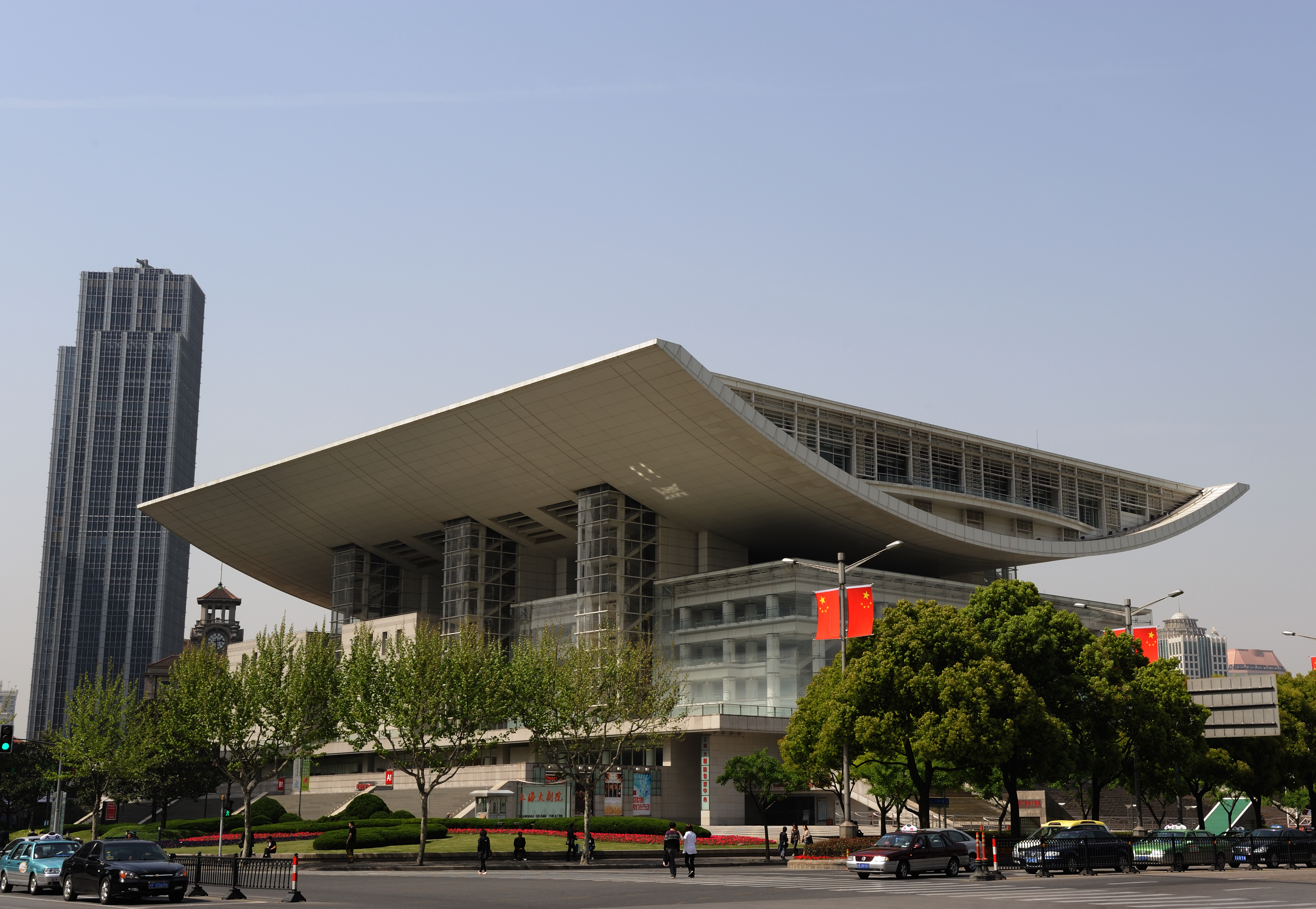
Shanghai Grand Theater

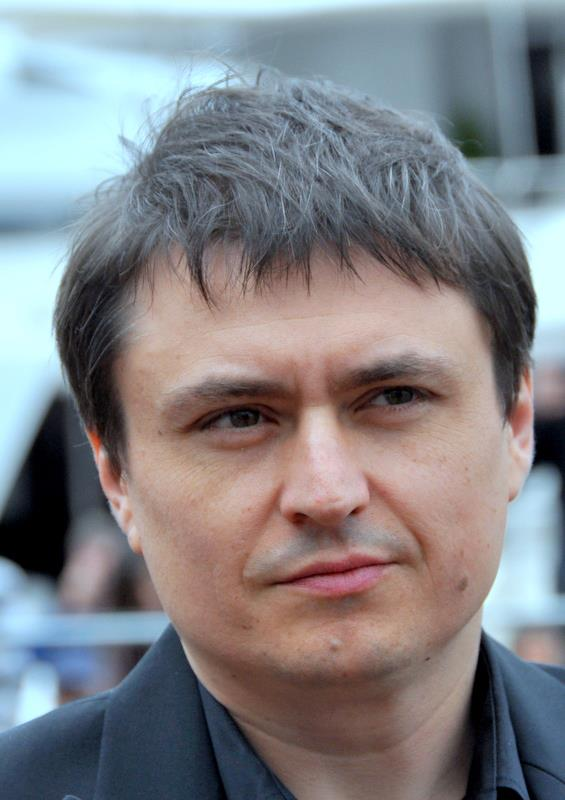
Cristian Mungiu, president of the jury for the Golden Goblet Award

The 2017 Shanghai International Film Festival was the 20th such festival devoted to international cinema held in Shanghai, China.

== International Jury ==
The members of the jury for the Golden Goblet Award were:

- Cristian Mungiu (Romanian director)
- Cao Baoping (Chinese director, screenwriter, producer)
- Li Qiang (Chinese screenwriter)
- Milcho Manchevski (USA/Macedonian director)
- Sabu (Japanese director)
- Gary Michael Walters (American producer)
- Xu Qing (Chinese actress)

== In Competition ==
English title	Director(s)	Production country
Brigsby Bear	Dave McCary	United States
The Chinese Widow	Bille August	China
The Conformist	Cai Shangjun	China
Fault Condition	Cătălin Saizescu	Romania
I'm a Killer	Maciej Pieprzyca	Poland
In the Great and Terrible World	Daniele Maggio	Italy
Kharms	Ivan Bolotnikov	Russia/Lithuania/Macedonia
Mad to be Normal	Robert Mullan	UK
My Brother Simple	Markus Goller	Germany
No Bed of Roses	Mostofa Sarwar Farooki	Bangladesh/India
Our Time Will Come	Ann Hui	China
Pedicab	Paolo Villaluna	Philippines
Reminiscence	Yasuo Furuhata	Japan
Yellow	Mostafa Taghizad’h	Iran

== Winners ==
=== Golden Goblet Awards ===
- Best Feature Film: Pedicab by Paolo Villaluna
- Jury Grand Prix: Yellow by Mostafa Taghizad’h
- Best Director: Maciej Pieprzyca for I'm a Killer
- Best Actor: Huang Bo for The Conformist
- Best Actress: Sareh Bayat for Yellow
- Best Screenplay: Ivan Bolotnikov for Kharms
- Best Cinematography: Shandor Berkeshi for Kharms
- Artistic Contribution: Fault Condition by Cătălin Saizescu

=== Asian New Talent Awards ===
- Best Film: Shuttle Life
- Best Director: Takumi Saito - Blank 13
- Best Script Writer: Wang Qiang - Sunshine that Can Move Mountains
- Best Cinematographer: Chen Ko-chin - Shuttle Life
- Best Actor: Jack Tan - Shuttle Life
- Best Actress: Adwa Bolle - Beneath the Silence
