= Leon Lee (actor) =

Chinese actor, director, and producer (born 1988)

Leon Lee (Chinese: 李晨浩; pinyin: Li Chenhao; born 18 October 1988) is a Chinese actor, director, and producer.

He appeared in Chinese movies including The Lost Tomb, The Conspirators, Streets of Fury, and Last Flight. In 2013, he starred as Mark in The Banman and was awarded the 2013 Best New Actor by the China Film Director Association.

== Early life ==
Leon Lee was born in Chongqing, Sichuan on October 18, 1988. whose first name means “Ocean in the morning” in Chinese. Leon’s father is a geography teacher, and his mother is a physician. He has wanted to become an actor since he was age 8, inspired by his uncle who owned video rental store. Growing up, he was full of energy and somewhat troublesome, so his parents decided to introduce him to various hobbies such as martial arts, basketball, horse-riding, science club and painting to keep him out of trouble, which worked out very well he even skipped 6th grade and graduated with honors. He quickly developed a love for acting at the age of 13 years when his English teacher encouraged him to start the English school play club. At the age of 15, Leon came in second place in local Amateur Comedy Contest.

== Acting career ==
Leon majored in English Literature in Chongqing Jiaotong University and he went to New York City to take acting and film-making courses as an exchange student, and later on he moved to Beijing to pursue his career in acting. In the meantime, he worked as an English teacher, model, emcee, and viral video producer. He starred and co-produced the Zui hou de qiang wang (2012 The Gunmen) after his famous 7-Up viral. In that time, he landed himself a starring role on La Vita Mode (2012 Singapore, Malaysia), The Conspirators (2013 Hong Kong), and Last Flight (2014 China Thailand).

== Filmography ==
=== Film ===
Year	Title	Role
2017	Sky Hunter	
2014	Streets Of Fury	Yifeng
2014	Last Flight	Liu Xia
2013	Bella's Winter	Mark
2013	The Banman	Michale
2012	Conspirators	Michale
2011	The Old Rifle	DOngzi

=== Television series ===
Year	Title	Role
2016	Noble Aspirations	Fa Xiang
2015	Rush Hour	Jawlong
2014	The Lost Tomb	Eric
2011	La Vita Mode	Ken
