= Shan Xin =

Chinese singer and voice actress

- 山新
- Born: Wang Shuang (王爽); 1 January 1989 (age 37); Zhengzhou, Henan, China
- Other name: Wang Youji (王宥霁)
- Occupations: singer; voice actress
- Years active: 2005 - present
- Known for: Luo Tianyi
- Spouse: Huang Zhenji (m. 2016–2026)

Chinese name
- Traditional Chinese: 山新
- Simplified Chinese: 山新
Transcriptions
Standard Mandarin
- Hanyu Pinyin: Shān Xīn

Shan Xin (Chinese: 山新; pinyin: Shān Xīn, literal meaning The New Mountain, born 1 January 1989), also known as Wang Youji or Wang Shuang, is a Chinese singer, voice actress and a core member of the TrioPen Studio (北斗企鹅工作室) and Drama Times (声创联盟).

Her stage name is derived from Kappei Yamaguchi (Japanese: 山口勝平) and Kudo Shinichi (Japanese: 工藤新一).

== Personal life ==
She married Huang Zhenji (皇贞季) in 2016, and currently lives in Beijing.

She announced her divorce in 2026.
