= Miss Puff =

2018 film by Zhang Xinyi

- 泡芙小姐
- Directed by: Zhang Xinyi
- Written by: Zhang Xinyi and San Pi
- Starring: Zhang Xinyi as Hou Paopao; Wang Yuexin as Gu Shang; Tan Weiwei as Ma Li; Sun Xiaoxiao as Shisanyao; Yu Shasha as Xiao Ruo; Chen Zheyuan as Wang Han; Zeng Yijun as San Mu
- Music by: "Liu Lang Tu Zhong Ai Shang Ni" by Ye Bei & Xu Wei; "Pao Fu Xuan Yan" by Zhang Xinyi & Liu Yu Fu
- Release date: February 9, 2018
- Country: China
- Language: Mandarin

Miss Puff (Chinese: 泡芙小姐) is a 2018 Chinese drama/romance film directed by Zhang Xinyi, starring Zhang Xinyi, Wang Yuexin, and Tan Weiwei. A spin-off from the eight-season animated series Miss Puff released on Youku in 2010 with over 1 billion views, the film was released in China on February 9, 2018. This film marks actress Zhang Xinyi’s directorial debut, who also co-wrote the plot with San Pi, the original creator and a Beijing animator.

Miss Puff is often used as the nickname of a strong and self-sufficient woman with an overseas education. Pi San, the movie's art consultant and the animated series' director, says Miss Puff exemplifies the rising population of elite Chinese women, who are pursuing career success as well as genuine love.

== Plot ==
Hou Paopao (Zhang Xinyi) grew up in a loving family. Upon returning from her overseas studying in Thailand, she attends a party with her three best friends- Ma Li (Tan Weiwei), Shisanyao (Sun Xiaoxiao) and Xiao Ruo (Yu Shasha). It was love at first sight after a romantic encounter with Gu Shang (Wang Yuexin), a young university student.

== Cast ==
- Zhang Xinyi as Hou Paopao
- Wang Yuexin as Gu Shang
- Tan Weiwei as Ma Li
- Sun Xiaoxiao as Shisanyao
- Yu Shasha as Xiao Ruo
- Chen Zheyuan as Wang Han
- Zeng Yijun as San Mu

== Movie soundtracks ==
- Liu Lang Tu Zhong Ai Shang Ni (流浪途中爱上你) by Ye Bei & Xu Wei (叶蓓&许巍)
- Pao Fu Xuan Yan (泡芙宣言) by Zhang Xinyi & Liu Yu Fu (张歆艺&刘宇芙)
