= List of Chinese films of 2021 =

The following is a list of mainland Chinese films first released in year 2021.

== Box office ==
The highest-grossing Chinese films released in 2021, by domestic box office gross revenue, are as follows:

Rank	Title	Domestic gross
1	The Battle at Lake Changjin	CN¥5.78 billion ($895.35 million)
2	Hi, Mom	CN¥5.41 billion ($839.22 million)
3	Detective Chinatown 3	CN¥4.52 billion ($701.24 million)
4	My Country, My Parents	CN¥1.48 billion ($228.99 million)
5	Raging Fire	CN¥1.33 billion ($206.05 million)
6	Chinese Doctors	CN¥1.33 billion ($205.89 million)
7	Cliff Walkers	CN¥1.19 billion ($184.65 million)
8	Fireflies in the Sun	CN¥1.12 billion ($173.8 million)
9	A Writer's Odyssey	CN¥1.04 billion ($160.47 million)
10	Embrace Again	CN¥937 million ($145.27 million)

== Films released ==
=== January–March ===
Opening		Title	Director(s)	Cast	Genre	Ref.
J A N U A R Y	15	The Soul	Cheng Wei-hao	Chang Chen, Ning Chang, Sun Anke, Christopher Lee	Science fiction thriller	
J A N U A R Y	22	Big Red Envelope	Li Kelong	Bao Bei'er, Clara Lee, Jia Bing, Zhang Yiming, Xu Juncong, Wang Xiaoli, Liao Weiwei, Yue Yueli	Romantic comedy	
F E B R U A R Y	12	Detective Chinatown 3	Chen Sicheng	Wang Baoqiang, Liu Haoran, Satoshi Tsumabuki, Tony Jaa	Comedy thriller	
F E B R U A R Y	12	A Writer's Odyssey	Lu Yang	Lei Jiayin, Yang Mi, Dong Zijian, Yu Hewei, Guo Jingfei	Fantasy adventure	
F E B R U A R Y	12	The Yinyang Master	Li Weiran	Chen Kun, Zhou Xun, William Chan, Qu Chuxiao, Wang Likun, Shen Yue, Wang Zixuan, Wang Ruiyi	Fantasy	
F E B R U A R Y	12	Hi, Mom	Jia Ling	Jia Ling, Zhang Xiaofei, Shen Teng, Chen He	Comedy	
F E B R U A R Y	12	Endgame	Rao Xiaozhi	Andy Lau, Xiao Yang, Wan Qian	Action comedy	
F E B R U A R Y	12	Boonie Bears: The Wild Life	Leon Ding, Shao Heqi	Zhang Bingjun, Tan Xiao, Zhang Wei	Animated	
F E B R U A R Y	12	New Gods: Nezha Reborn	Zhao Ji	Yang Tianxiang, Zhang He, Xuan Xiaoming	Animated	

=== April–June ===
Opening		Title	Director(s)	Cast	Genre	Ref.
A P R I L	2	The Eleventh Chapter	Chen Jianbin	Chen Jianbin, Zhou Xun, Dong Chengpeng, Leah Dou	Comedy drama	
A P R I L	2	Sister	Yin Ruoxi	Zhang Zifeng, Xiao Yang, Zhu Yuanyuan, Duan Bowen, Connor Leong	Drama	
A P R I L	16	August Never Ends	Li Kai	Zhong Chuxi, Tan Songyun, Luo Jin	Romance	
A P R I L	16	The Six	Arthur Jones	Steven Schwankert, Tom Fong	Documentary	
A P R I L	30	Cliff Walkers	Zhang Yimou	Zhang Yi, Yu Hewei, Qin Hailu, Zhu Yawen, Liu Haocun	Spy thriller	
A P R I L	30	My Love	Han Tian	Greg Hsu, Zhang Ruonan, Ding Guansen, Yan Zidong, Guo Cheng, Wang Shasha	Romantic comedy	
M A Y	1	Home Sweet Home	Leste Chen	Aaron Kwok, Duan Yihong, Zhang Zifeng, Hsu Wei-ning, Rong Zishan	Thriller	
M A Y	1	Tiger Robbers	Li Yu	Ma Li, Song Jia, Zhang Haiyu, Tizzy T	Crime comedy	
M A Y	1	Dynasty Warriors	Roy Chow	Louis Koo, Wang Kai, Tony Yang, Carina Lau, Han Geng, Justin Cheung, Gulnazar, Ray Lui	Fantasy action	
M A Y	1	Once Upon a Time in Hong Kong	Wong Jing, Woody Hui	Louis Koo, Tony Leung, Francis Ng, Gordon Lam	Action crime	
M A Y	20	Love Will Tear Us Apart	Mo Sha	Qu Chuxiao, Zhang Jingyi	Romantic drama	
J U N E	18	On Your Mark	Chiu Keng Guan	Wang Yanhui, Zhang Youhao, Gong Beibi	Drama	
J U N E	18	Island Keeper	Chen Li	Liu Ye, Gong Zhe, Hou Yong, Sun Weimin, Song Chunli, Zhang Yishan, Chen Chuang, Tao Huimin, Ma Shaohua, Chi Peng	Biographical drama	

=== July–September ===
Opening		Title	Director(s)	Cast	Genre	Ref.
J U L Y	1	The Pioneer	Xu Zhanxiong	Zhang Songwen, Li Yifeng, Tong Liya, Peng Yuchang, Qin Hao	Historical drama	
J U L Y	1	1921	Huang Jianxin, Zheng Dasheng	Huang Xuan, Ni Ni, Wang Renjun, Liu Haoran	Historical drama	
J U L Y	9	Chinese Doctors	Andrew Lau	Zhang Hanyu, Yuan Quan, Zhu Yawen, Li Chen, Jackson Yee, Ou Hao	Disaster	
J U L Y	17	The Day We Lit Up The Sky	Zhang Yibai, Yan Han	Peng Yuchang, Natalie Hsu, Zhang Youhao, Yin Zheng, Sun Rui, Si Waige, Liao Yueying, Hu Yuxuan	Youth	
J U L Y	23	Green Snake	Amp Wong	Tang Xiaoxi, Wai Wai	Animated	
J U L Y	23	Agent Backkom: Kings Bear	Zhang Yang	Shuiyu Tang, Meng Ziyan	Animated	
J U L Y	30	Raging Fire	Benny Chan	Donnie Yen, Nicholas Tse, Qin Lan	Action	
J U L Y	30	Upcoming Summer	Leste Chen	Zhang Zifeng, Leo Wu, Hao Lei, Zu Feng	Romantic drama	
S E P T E M B E R	17	Cloudy Mountain	Li Jun	Zhu Yilong, Huang Zhizhong, Chen Shu, Jiao Junyan	Action	
S E P T E M B E R	19	Swimming Out Till the Sea Turns Blue	Jia Zhangke	Huifang Duan, Liang Hong, Pingwa Jia, Yu Hua	Documentary	
S E P T E M B E R	30	The Battle at Lake Changjin	Chen Kaige, Tsui Hark, Dante Lam	Wu Jing, Jackson Yee, Duan Yihong, Zhang Hanyu, Zhu Yawen, Li Chen, Hu Jun	War drama	
S E P T E M B E R	30	My Country, My Parents	Wu Jing, Zhang Ziyi, Xu Zheng, Shen Teng	Wu Jing, Zhang Ziyi, Xu Zheng, Shen Teng	Anthology drama	

=== October–December ===
Opening		Title	Director(s)	Cast	Genre	Ref.
O C T O B E R	15	Saturday Fiction	Lou Ye	Gong Li, Mark Chao, Joe Odagiri, Pascal Greggory, Tom Wlaschiha, Huang Xiangli, Ayumu Nakajima, Wang Chuanjun, Zhang Songwen	Drama	
O C T O B E R	15	The Curse of Turandot	Zheng Xiaolong	Guan Xiaotong, Dylan Sprouse, Hu Jun, Lin Siyi, Collin Chou, Wang Jia	Romantic fantasy	
O C T O B E R	22	Love After Love	Ann Hui	Ma Sichun, Faye Yu, Eddie Peng, Janine Chang, Fan Wei, Isabella Leong, Zhang Jianing, Yin Fang, Paul Chun, Michelle Bai	Romantic drama	
N O V E M B E R	11	Be Somebody	Xunzimo Liu	Yin Zheng, Deng Jiajia, Yu Entai, Yang Haoyu, Zhang Benyu, Ke Da, Chen Minghao, Qin Xiaoxian, Deng Enxi	Comedy mystery	
N O V E M B E R	19	Railway Heroes	Yang Feng	Zhang Hanyu, Fan Wei, Vision Wei, Zhou Ye, Yu Haoming	War	
N O V E M B E R	26	Striding Into the Wind	Wei Shujun	Zhou You, Zheng Yingchen, Wang Xiaomu, Tong Linkai, Zhao Duona, Liu Yuting, Li Meng	Drama	
D E C E M B E R	3	Schemes in Antiques	Derek Kwok	Lei Jiayin, Li Xian, Xin Zhilei, Ge You	Adventure thriller	
D E C E M B E R	10	Good Night Beijing	Jaycee Chan, Zhang Xiaolei	Chen Bolin, Amber Kuo, Erica Xia-Hou	Romance	
D E C E M B E R	17	Fireflies in the Sun	Dai Mo	Xiao Yang, Simon Yam, Janice Man, Chen Yusi, Song Yang, Aarif Rahman, Chang Shih	Crime thriller	
D E C E M B E R	17	I Am What I Am	Sun Haipeng	Li Xin, Yexiong Chen, Hao Guo, Meng Li, Jiasi Li, Cai Zhuangzhuang	Animated	
D E C E M B E R	24	B for Busy	Shao Yihui	Xu Zheng, Ma Yili, Wu Yue, Ni Hongjie, Zhou Yemang, Justin Huang, Wang Yinglu	Romantic drama	
D E C E M B E R	31	Embrace Again	Xue Xiaolu	Huang Bo, Jia Ling, Zhu Yilong, Xu Fan, Gao Yalin, Wu Yanshu, Benz Hui, Zhou Dongyu, Liu Haoran	Romance	

== See also ==
- List of Chinese films of 2020
- List of Chinese films of 2022
