= List of 2021 box office number-one films in China =

This is a list of films which placed number-one at the weekend box office in China during 2021.

== Number-one films ==
†	This implies the highest-grossing movie of the year.

#	Date	Film	Gross
1	3 January 2021	A Little Red Flower	US$80,100,000
2	10 January 2021	A Little Red Flower	US$43,100,000
3	17 January 2021	A Little Red Flower	US$11,700,000
4	24 January 2021	Big Red Envelope	US$8,000,000
5	31 January 2021	Big Red Envelope	US$7,400,000
6	7 February 2021	Shock Wave 2	US$4,860,000
7	14 February 2021	Detective Chinatown 3	US$398,000,000
8	21 February 2021	Hi, Mom	US$134,000,000
9	28 February 2021	Hi, Mom	US$53,300,000
10	7 March 2021	Hi, Mom	US$22,900,000
11	14 March 2021	Avatar	US$21,221,037
12	21 March 2021	Avatar	US$14,146,720
13	28 March 2021	Godzilla vs. Kong	US$69,200,000
14	4 April 2021	Sister	US$52,800,000
15	11 April 2021	Sister	US$20,800,000
16	18 April 2021	Detective Conan: The Scarlet Bullet	US$16,800,000
17	25 April 2021	Detective Conan: The Scarlet Bullet	US$4,800,000
18	2 May 2021	My Love	US$65,100,000
19	9 May 2021	Cliff Walkers	US$24,500,000
20	16 May 2021	Cliff Walkers	US$16,600,000
21	23 May 2021	F9	US$137,500,000
22	30 May 2021	F9	US$20,750,000
23	6 June 2021	F9	US$8,750,000
24	13 June 2021	Never Stop	US$10,700,000
25	20 June 2021	On Your Mark	US$8,690,000
26	27 June 2021	1921	US$11,530,000
27	4 July 2021	1921	US$45,640,000
28	11 July 2021	Chinese Doctors	US$53,950,000
29	18 July 2021	Chinese Doctors	US$42,550,000
30	25 July 2021	White Snake 2	US$43,190,860
31	1 August 2021	Raging Fire	US$37,430,000
32	8 August 2021	Raging Fire	US$21,450,000
33	15 August 2021	Raging Fire	US$26,178,000
34	22 August 2021	Raging Fire	US$12,530,000
35	29 August 2021	Free Guy	US$23,890,000
36	5 September 2021	Free Guy	US$18,450,000
37	12 September 2021	Stand by Me (2019 film)	US$12,005,000
38	19 September 2021	Cloudy Mountain	US$10,005,000
39	26 September 2021	Cloudy Mountain	US$10,500,000
40	3 October 2021	The Battle at Lake Changjin †	US$203,120,000
41	10 October 2021	The Battle at Lake Changjin †	US$105,500,000
42	17 October 2021	The Battle at Lake Changjin †	US$72,100,000
43	24 October 2021	The Battle at Lake Changjin †	US$32,300,000
44	31 October 2021	No Time to Die	US$28,252,000
45	7 November 2021	No Time to Die	US$11,359,000
46	14 November 2021	Be Somebody	US$20,000,000
47	19 November 2021	Be Somebody	US$43,100,000
48	26 November 2021	Be Somebody	US$21,900,000
49	5 December 2021	Schemes in Antiques	US$25,600,000
50	12 December 2021	Schemes in Antiques	US$14,500,000
51	19 December 2021	No Time to Die	US$77,000
52	26 December 2021	Fireflies in the Sun	US$1,800,000

Preceded by 2020 Box office number-one films	Box office number-one films 2021	Succeeded by 2022 Box office number-one films
