= List of Chinese films of 2020 =

The following is a list of mainland Chinese films first released in year 2020. A number of films scheduled for release early in the year were delayed or released online due to the COVID-19 pandemic.

== Box office ==
The highest-grossing Chinese films released in 2020, by domestic box office gross revenue, are as follows:

Highest-grossing domestic films of 2020 in China
Rank	Title	Domestic gross
1	The Eight Hundred	CN¥3.11 billion ($450.82 million)
2	My People, My Homeland	CN¥2.83 billion ($438.76 million)
3	Jiang Ziya	CN¥1.60 billion ($248.53 million)
4	A Little Red Flower	CN¥1.43 billion ($222.02 million)
5	Shock Wave 2	CN¥1.32 billion ($204.03 million)
6	The Sacrifice	CN¥1.13 billion ($174.73 million)
7	Warm Hug	CN¥864 million ($133.95 million)
8	Leap	CN¥836 million ($129.61 million)
9	Caught in Time	CN¥538 million ($83.41 million)
10	The Rescue	CN¥485 million ($75.19 million)

== Films released ==
=== January–March ===
Opening		Title	Director(s)	Cast	Genre	Ref.
J A N U A R Y	10	Stop! Thieves!	Zheng Yun	Zheng Yun, Bruce Leung, You Yong	Comedy	
J A N U A R Y	10	Wild Boar	Ye Zhuhong	Wang Xuankun, Hou Tongjiang, Liu Dongming	Comedy drama	
J A N U A R Y	11	Spycies	Guillaume Ivernel; Zhiyi Zhang	Karen Strassman, Monsieur Poulpe, Davy Mourier	Animated	
J A N U A R Y	25	Lost in Russia	Xu Zheng	Xu Zheng, Huang Meiying, Yuan Quan	Comedy	
F E B R U A R Y	3	Sub-subconscious	Zhou Chengzhou	Chen huiqi, Huo Bingling, Li Chuanshuai, Wang Guoqing, Zhao Yuanjie	Drama	

=== July–September ===
Opening		Title	Director(s)	Cast	Genre	Ref.
J U L Y	20	A First Farewell	Lina Wang	Isa Yasan, Kalbinur Rahmati	Drama	
A U G U S T	21	The Eight Hundred	Guan Hu	Huang Zhizhong, Ou Hao, Wang Qianyuan, Jiang Wu, Zhang Yi, Du Chun, Vision Wei, Li Chen, Yu Haoming	War drama	
S E P T E M B E R	25	Leap	Peter Chan	Gong Li, Huang Bo, Wu Gang, Peng Yuchang, Lydia Bai	Sports drama	
S E P T E M B E R	30	Vanguard	Stanley Tong	Jackie Chan, Yang Yang, Ai Lun, Miya Muqi, Xu Ruohan	Action	

=== October–December ===
Opening		Title	Director(s)	Cast	Genre	Ref.
O C T O B E R	1	Jiang Ziya	Cheng Teng; Li Wei	Zheng Xi, Yang Ning, Tutehameng, Yan Meme, Ji Guanlin, Jiang Guangtao	Animated	
O C T O B E R	1	My People, My Homeland	Ning Hao, Xu Zheng, Chen Sicheng, Fei Yan, Da-Mo Peng	Ge You, Huang Bo, Fan Wei, Deng Chao, Shen Teng	Comedy	
O C T O B E R	23	The Sacrifice	Guan Hu, Frant Gwo, Lu Yang	Zhang Yi, Wu Jing, Li Jiuxiao, Vision Wei, Deng Chao	War drama	
O C T O B E R	30	Oversize Love	Zhang Linzi	Guan Xiaotong, Huang Jingyu	Romance	
N O V E M B E R	6	Back to the Wharf	Li Xiaofeng	Zhang Yu, Lee Hong-chi, Song Jia	Crime	
N O V E M B E R	20	Caught in Time	Lau Ho-leung	Wang Qianyuan, Daniel Wu, Jessie Li, Michelle Wai	Action crime	
N O V E M B E R	20	I Hope You Are Well	Du Bin	Du Yiheng, Zhu Ziyue, Wang Like, Frankie Ng	Drama	
N O V E M B E R	27	One Second	Zhang Yimou	Zhang Yi, Liu Haocun, Fan Wei	Drama	
D E C E M B E R	4	L.O.R.D: Legend of Ravaging Dynasties 2	Guo Jingming	Fan Bingbing, Kris Wu, Chen Xuedong	Animated	
D E C E M B E R	18	The Rescue	Dante Lam	Eddie Peng, Wang Yanlin, Xin Zhilei	Action	
D E C E M B E R	25	The Yin-Yang Master: Dream of Eternity	Guo Jingming	Mark Chao, Deng Lun, Wang Ziwen, Jessie Li, Duo Wang	Fantasy	
D E C E M B E R	31	A Little Red Flower	Han Yan	Jackson Yee, Liu Haocun, Zhu Yuanyuan, Gao Yalin, Xia Yu	Drama	

== See also ==
- List of Chinese films of 2019
- List of Chinese films of 2021
