= 34th Golden Rooster Awards =

2021 Chinese film awards

- Date: December 30, 2021
- Site: Xiamen International Conference & Exhibition Center; Xiamen, China
- Organized by: China Film Association

Highlights
- Best Feature Film: Island Keeper
- Best Direction: Zhang Yimou; Cliff Walkers
- Best Actor: Zhang Yi; Cliff Walkers
- Best Actress: Zhang Xiaofei; Hi, Mom

Television coverage
- Network: CCTV

The 34th Golden Rooster Awards honoring best Chinese language films which presented during 2020–21. The award ceremony was held in Xiamen, China, and broadcast by CCTV-6.

== Winners and nominees ==
Best Picture	Best Director
Island Keeper; Chinese Doctors; My People, My Homeland; Sister; The Pioneer; Cliff Walkers	Zhang Yimou–Cliff Walkers; Yin Li–A Hustle Bustle New Year; Huang Jianxin and Zheng Dasheng–1921; Han Yan–A Little Red Flower; Lu Yang–A Writer's Odyssey
Best Actor	Best Actress
Zhang Yi–Cliff Walkers; Yu Hewei–Cliff Walkers; Liu Ye–Island Keeper; Jackson Yee–A Little Red Flower; Guo Xiaodong–My Father Jiao Yulu	Zhang Xiaofei–Hi, Mom; Liu Haocun–A Little Red Flower; Liu Mintao–Let Life Be Beautiful; Zhang Zifeng–Sister
Best Supporting Actor	Best Supporting Actress
Fan Wei–One Second; Zhu Yawen–Chinese Doctors; Liu Peiqing–Behind Forest Farm; Xiao Yang–Sister; Nicholas Tse–Raging Fire	Zhu Yuanyuan–Sister; Ding Liuyuan–My Father Jiao Yulu; Liu Jia–Hi, Mom; Zhou Ye–1921; Soinam Wangmo–Gone With the Wind
Best Directorial Debut	Best Low-budget Feature
Dadren Wanggyal–Gone With the Wind; Yu Fei–Little Canned Men; Baoyin Gexige–Harhuu; Jia Ling–Hi, Mom	Fish Under the Ice; Behind Forest Farm; Seeing Nara Again; Harhuu; Gone With the Wind
Best Writing	Best Editing
Yu Xi, Huang Xin and Zhao Ningyu–1921; Zhang Li–Fish Under the Ice; Chen Li, Ding Han and Zhao Enzhe–Island Keeper; Gao Mantang and Li Wei–My Father Jiao Yulu; Mei Duo, Dengba Daji and Zerangque–Gone With the Wind; Guan Hu, Wu Bing, Zhang Ke and Jing Yu–The Pioneer	Azrael Chung–Shock Wave 2; Yu Baiyang–1921; Zhu Libin and Zhu Lin–A Writer's Odyssey; Yang Hongyu–The Pioneer; Zhou Yuan–Coffee or Tea
Best Cinematography	Best Art Direction
Zhao Xiaoding–Cliff Walkers; Zhao Xiaoshi–A Hustle Bustle New Year; Zhong Rui–A Little Red Flower; Cao Yu–1921; Han Qiming–A Writer's Odyssey	Huo Tingxiao–The Pioneer; Li Miao–A Writer's Odyssey; Li Peng–Fish Under the Ice; Lin Mu–Cliff Walkers; Lin Chaoxiang–One Second
Best Music	Best Sound Recording
Comfort Chan, Kay Chan–Chinese Doctors; Yu Fei–A Writer's Odyssey; Yang Yibo–My Father Jiao Yulu; Gao Xiaoyang–Sister; Dou Peng–The Pioneer	Tao Jing–One Second; Wang Gang, Liu Xiaosha and Xiong Yi–A Writer's Odyssey; Yang Jiang and Zhao Nan–Cliff Walkers; Yang Jingyi–1921; Zhou Lei and Wu Lei–Sister
Best Animated Feature	Best Children's Film
White Snake 2: The Tribulation of the Green Snake; Beginning of Autumn; Wish Dragon; Master Ji Gong; The Best Cute People	Let Life Be Beautiful; Little Canned Men; Bamboo Hat
Best Chinese Opera Film	Best Documentary
Story of Nanyue; Three Drops of Blood; Silang Visits His Mother; Bao Zheng; New Love Story	The Post-90s Generation; Together; The Great Learning; Light Chaser; Tough Out
Best Foreign Language Film	Special Jury Prize
The Father; Pinocchio; Persian Lessons; Wolfwalkers; Happy Old Year	My People, My Homeland
