= Wedding Bible =

Wedding Bible may refer to:

- Wedding Bible (gift), a Bible associated with weddings
- Wedding Bible, a Chinese film of 2020
