= 15th Asian Film Awards =

2021 edition of award ceremony

- Official title card
- Awarded for: Excellence in Asian cinema
- Awarded by: Hong Kong International Film Festival; Busan International Film Festival; Tokyo International Film Festival
- Presented by: The Asian Film Awards Academy (AFAA)
- Announced on: Nominations: September 9, 2021
- Presented on: October 8, 2021
- Site: Busan, South Korea
- Hosted by: Kim Gyu-ri; Lee Seung-guk
- Official website: Asian Film Awards

Highlights
- Best Picture: Wife of a Spy
- Asian Film Excellence Award: Lee Byung-hun (South Korea)
- Best Direction: Zhang Yimou; One Second
- Best Actor: Yoo Ah-in; Voice of Silence
- Best Actress: Yū Aoi; Wife of a Spy
- Best Supporting Actor: Kim Hyun-bin; The Silent Forest
- Best Supporting Actress: Aju Makita; True Mothers
- Most awards: 3 - Wife of a Spy
- Most nominations: 6 - Cliff Walkers

The 15th Asian Film Awards was held on October 8, 2021, in Busan at Haeundae. Like 2020 edition it was staged with the 26th Busan International Film Festival in hybrid format that combines online and face-to-face participation. The award show was hosted by actress Kim Gyu-ri and broadcaster Lee Seung-guk.

In 15th edition of Asian Film Awards, 36 films from 8 Asian regions competed for 16 awards. Director Kiyoshi Kurosawa's Wife of a Spy (2020) won the best picture award at the ceremony streamed live on YouTube and Naver.

== Nomination committee ==
- Edmund LEE (Hong Kong) - South China Morning Post Film Editor
- ICHIYAMA Shozo (Japan) - Programming Director, Tokyo International Film Festival
- JEONG Yeong-beom (South Korea) - President, Star J Entertainment
- Kiki FUNG - Hong Kong International Film Festival Programme Consultant
- DAN Kyoko (Japan) - Film Coordinator, Marketing Consultant
- ONDA Yasuko (Japan) - Staff Writer, Yomiuri Newspaper
- SHAN Dongbing (China) - Managing Director, Delight Consultancy
- Alex JIA (China) - Vice President & CCO, WD Pictures
- PARK Sun-young (South Korea) - Busan International Film Festival Programmer for Asian Cinema

== Jury ==
- Lee Chang-dong (South Korea) as Jury President - Director and writer
- NAM Dong-chul (South Korea) - Busan International Film Festival Program Director, author of the Korean Film Weekly Cine 21
- Janet WU Yanyan - Director, China Film Foundation – WuTianMing Film Fund for Young Talents
- Jennifer JAO (Taiwan) - Vice Chairman and Director, Taipei Film Commission
- ISHIZAKA Kenji (Japan) - Senior Programmer, Tokyo International Film Festival
- Sabrina BARACETTI (Italy) - President, Udine Far East Film Festival and Centro Espressioni Cinematografiche
- Jacob WONG - Director, Hong Kong Asia Film Financing Forum, HKIFFS, Delegate for mainland China, Taiwan and Hong Kong of the Berlinale
- Briccio SANTOS (Philippines) - President, Film ASEAN

== Awards and nominations ==
Complete list of nominees:

Source Awardees:

Best Film	Best Director
Wife of a Spy (Japan); Wheel of Fortune and Fantasy (Japan); The Disciple (India); The Book of Fish (South Korea); One Second (China)	Zhang Yimou – One Second (China); Adhilkan Yerzhanov – Yellow Cat (Kazakhstan); Kiyoshi Kurosawa – Wife of a Spy (Japan); Ryusuke Hamaguchi – Wheel of Fortune and Fantasy (Japan); Lee Joon-ik – The Book of Fish (South Korea)
Best Actor	Best Actress
Yoo Ah-in – Voice of Silence as Tae-in (South Korea); Kōji Yakusho – Under the Open Sky as Masao Mikami (Japan); Mo Tzu-yi – Dear Tenant as Lin Jian-yi (Taiwan); Zhang Yi – One Second as fugitive (China); Lam Ka Tung – Limbo as Brother Chin (Hong Kong)	Yū Aoi – Wife of a Spy as Satoko Fukuhara (Japan); Jeon Jong-seo – The Call as Oh Young-sook (South Korea); Zhang Zifeng – Sister as An Ran, an older sister (China); Chen Shu-fang – Little Big Women as Lin Xiu-ying (Taiwan); Asel Sadvakasova – Ulbolsyn as Ulbolsyn (Kazakhstan)
Best Supporting Actor	Best Supporting Actress
Kim Hyun-bin - The Silent Forest as Xiao Guang (Taiwan); Yu Ailei - Cliff Walkers as Zhou Yi (China); Park Jung-min - Deliver Us from Evil as Yui (South Korea); Tse Kwan-ho - Drifting as Master (Hong Kong); Uno Shohei - The Voice of Sin as Ikushima Soichiro (Japan)	Aju Makita - True Mothers as Hikari Katakura (Japan); Qin Hailu - Cliff Walkers as Wang Yu (China); Loletta Lee - Drifting as Chan Mui (Hong Kong); Hsieh Ying-xuan - Little Big Women as Chen Wan-qing (Taiwan); Jang Yoon-ju - Three Sisters as Mi-ok (South Korea)
Best New Director	Best Newcomer
Hong Eui-jeong - Voice of Silence (South Korea); Yūjirō Harumoto - A Balance (Japan); PS Vinothraj - Pebbles (India); Yin Ruoxi - Sister (China); Han Shuai - Summer Blur (China); Ahmad Bahrami - The Wasteland (Iran)	Liu Haocun - One Second (China); Gong Seung-yeon - Aloners (South Korea); Misaki Hattori - Midnight Swan (Japan); Rouhollah Zamani - Sun Children (Iran); Buffy Chen - The Silent Forest (Taiwan)
Best Screenplay	Best Editing
Chaitanya Tamhane - The Disciple (India); Chen Yu-hsun - My Missing Valentine (Taiwan); You Xiaoying - Sister (China); Hong Eui-jeong - Voice of Silence (South Korea)	Li Yongyi - Cliff Walkers (China); Kim Hyung-joo - Deliver Us from Evil (South Korea); Lai Hsiu-hsiung - My Missing Valentine (Taiwan); Hassan Hassandust - Sun Children (Iran); Tina Baz, Shibuya Yangichi - True Mothers (Japan)
Best Cinematography	Best Music
Masoud Amini Tirani - The Wasteland (Iran); Yūta Tsukinaga - Any Crybabies Around? (Japan); Zhao Xiaoding - Cliff Walkers (China); Hong Kyung-pyo - Deliver Us from Evil (South Korea); Cheng Siu-Keung - Limbo (Hong Kong); Yerkinbek Ptyraliyev - Yellow Cat (Kazakhstan)	Day Tai - The Way We Keep Dancing (Hong Kong); Jo Yeong-wook - Cliff Walkers (China); Mowg - Deliver Us from Evil (South Korea); Lao Zai - One Second (China)
Best Costume Design	Best Production Design
Valerian Spring Tree - Wife of a Spy (Japan); Chen Minzheng - Cliff Walkers (China); Cho Sang-kyung, Kwak Jung-ae - Space Sweepers (South Korea); Shim Hyun-seob - The Book of Fish (South Korea); Yermek Utegenov - Yellow Cat (Kazakhstan)	Kenneth Mak - Limbo (Hong Kong); Li Miao - A Writer's Odyssey (China); Gokuldas - Labyrinth (India); Lee Jae-Sung - The Book of Fish (South Korea); Ataka Norifumi - Wife of a Spy (Japan)
Best Visual Effects	Best Sound
Tim Crosbie, Joy Wu - The Eight Hundred (China); Eric Xu, Allen Wei - A Writer's Odyssey (China); Tomi Kuo - My Missing Valentine (Taiwan); Issei Oda - Ora Ora, Be Going Alone (Japan); Jeong Seong-jin, Jeong Chol-min - Space Sweepers (South Korea)	Nopawat Likitwong - Limbo (Hong Kong); Hironaka Chiyori - Any Crybabies Around? (Japan); Renganaath Ravee - Labyrinth (India); Choi Tae-young - Space Sweepers (South Korea); Fu Kang - The Eight Hundred (China)
Excellence in Asian Cinema Award	2020 Highest Grossing Asian Film
Lee Byung-hun (South Korea)	The Blade of Destruction: Infinite Train (Theatrical Version) (Japan)

== Films with multiple nominations ==
The following films received multiple nominations:

Nominations	Films
6	Cliff Walkers
5	One Second
5	Wife of a Spy
4	The Book of Fish
4	Limbo
4	Deliver Us from Evil
3	My Missing Valentine
3	Sister
3	Space Sweepers
3	Voice of Silence
3	Yellow Cat
