= My People, My Country =

- Film poster

Chinese name
- Traditional Chinese: 我和我的祖國
- Simplified Chinese: 我和我的祖国
- Literal meaning: Me and my motherland
Transcriptions
Standard Mandarin
- Hanyu Pinyin: wǒ hé wǒ de zǔguó
- Directed by: Chen Kaige; Zhang Yibai; Guan Hu; Xue Xiaolu; Xu Zheng; Ning Hao; Wen Muye
- Produced by: Huang Jianxin
- Starring: Huang Bo; Geng Le; Oho Ou; Zhang Yi; Ren Suxi; Wu Jing; Ma Yili; Du Jiang; Zhu Yilong; Wang Daotie; Ge You; Gong Beibi; Liu Haoran; Arthur Chen; Tian Zhuangzhuang; Song Jia
- Cinematography: Wang Boxue; Cao Yu
- Edited by: Huangzeng Hongchen
- Music by: Faye Wong; Wang Zhiyi
- Production companies: Huaxia Film Distribution; Polybona Films; Alibaba Pictures
- Distributed by: Huaxia Film Distribution
- Release date: 30 September 2019 (China)
- Running time: 158 minutes
- Country: China
- Language: Mandarin Chinese
- Box office: $450 million

My People, My Country (Chinese: 我和我的祖国) is a 2019 Chinese anthology drama film, consisting of seven segments directed by seven directors, Chen Kaige, Zhang Yibai, Guan Hu, Xue Xiaolu, Xu Zheng, Ning Hao, and Wen Muye. It stars many of China's top actors, many in supporting roles and cameos. My People, My Country is produced jointly by Huaxia Film Distribution, Polybona Films and Alibaba Pictures. The film was released in China on September 30, 2019, to commemorate the 70th anniversary of the establishment of the People's Republic of China. It has two sequels, My People, My Homeland (2020) and My Country, My Parents (2021).

== Plot ==
=== The Eve ===
The opening segment by director Guan Hu, "The Eve" (前夜), is about an engineer, Lin Zhiyuan (played by Huang Bo), racing against time to perfect an automatic flag-raising mechanism before the founding ceremony of the People's Republic of China. Due to a faulty part, they scrounge the neighborhood for resources to build another one. They get many enthusiastic donations, and successfully install the mechanism at dawn.

=== Passing By ===
The second story "Passing By" (相遇), directed by Zhang Yibai, sees Gao Yuan (played by Zhang Yi), a scientist working on China's first atom bomb, who had to disappear from his lover in the 1960s. After receiving furlough due to a workplace radiation accident, he encounters her on a bus. She pleads for him to talk to her and reminisces before the bus is stopped by a parade celebrating the successful atomic test. Yuan dies some time later.

=== The Champion ===
The third story "The Champion" (夺冠), directed by Xu Zheng, is about how a young boy from Shanghai named Dong Dong (played by Han Haolin) helped his neighbors watch TV for the China women's national volleyball team's Olympic gold medal win in 1984 at the cost of not being able to bid farewell to his crush.

=== Going Home ===
The fourth story "Going Home" (回归), directed by Xue Xiaolu, is about a Chinese executive delegation and local policemen preparing for the return of Hong Kong from British rule to China in 1997. The 12-second silence between the British and Chinese anthems during the Hong Kong handover ceremony is also reflected in this part.

=== Hello Beijing ===
The fifth story "Hello Beijing" (北京你好), directed by Ning Hao, is about a taxi driver who gives a ticket to the opening ceremony of the 2008 Beijing Olympics to a boy from the Sichuan earthquake zone, who attempted to steal it, though it was intended to be a birthday gift for his son.

=== The Guiding Star ===
The sixth story "The Guiding Star" (白昼流星), directed by Chen Kaige, is about a pair of homeless brothers who witness the landing of the capsule of the Shenzhou 11 crewed spacecraft on November 18, 2016, a moment of national pride that touched them.

=== One for All ===
"One for All" (护航), directed by Wen Muye, follows the story of a top female fighter jet pilot Lü Xiaoran who helps her fellow pilots accomplish a smooth aerial performance at the Military Parade of the 70th Anniversary of the Victory in the Second Sino-Japanese War in 1945.

== Cast ==
The Eve (directed by Guan Hu)

- Huang Bo as Lin Zhiyuan
- Oho Ou
- Wang Qianyuan
- Liang Jing
- Jiang Wu
- Hu Jun
- Tong Dawei
- Vision Wei
- Xin Baiqing
- Geng Le
- Wang Tianchen

Passing by (directed by Zhang Yibai)

- Zhang Yi as Gao Yuan
- Ren Suxi as Fang Min
- Zhang Jiayi as Group Leader
- Zhou Dongyu as Nurse
- Peng Yuchang
- Luo Haiqiong
- Guo Cheng
- Zhou Yiran

The Champion (directed by Xu Zheng)

- Wu Jing as Xu Dongdong (adult)
- Ma Yili as Zhao Qimei (adult)
- Han Haolin as Xu Dongdong (child)
- Fan Yujie as Zhao Qimei (child)
- Liu Tao as Mei's mother
- Xu Zheng as television anchor
- Wang Zhifei
- Shao Wen
- Zhang Zhihua
- Duan Bowen as Table Tennis Coach

Going Home (directed by Xue Xiaolu)

- Du Jiang as Zhu Tao
- Zhu Yilong as Song Yueqiang
- Wang Daotie as Wang Yinghui
- Wang Luoyong as An Wenbin
- Kara Wai as Lin
- Simon Yam as Wah
- Gao Yalin as Cheng Zhiqiang
- Gregory Charles Rivers as Hugh Davies
- Natasha Dratinskaia Christiansen as Maureen Earls
- Kwok Keung Cheung

Hello Beijing (directed by Ning Hao)

- Ge You as Zhang Beijing
- Cheng Yusen as Zhang Xiaojing
- Gong Beibi as Yuan Rong
- Wang Dong as Boy from Wenchuan
- Ma Shuliang as Taxi Company Leader

The Guiding Star (directed by Chen Kaige)

- Liu Haoran
- Arthur Chen
- Tian Zhuangzhuang
- Jiang Shan
- Jing Haipeng
- Chen Dong

One for All (directed by Wen Muye)

- Song Jia
- Tong Liya
- Elvis Han
- Lei Jiayin
- Zhang Zifeng
- Wang Yanhui
- Tao Hong
- Guo Jingfei
- Yuan Wenkang

== Music ==
No.	Title	Lyrics	Music	Singer(s)	Length
1.	"My People, My Country (我和我的祖国)" (Opening theme)	Zhang Li	Qin Yongcheng	Faye Wong

== Release ==
On March 20, 2019, the producers announced that the film was slated for release on October 1, 2019, during the National Day. On September 6, 2019, it was announced that the film has been advanced to September 30, 2019.

My People, My Country was distributed by China Media Capital, a major international distributor of Chinese film and television, in the United States, Canada, Australia and New Zealand.

== Reception ==
=== Box office ===
With a total gross of over $474 million, My People, My Country currently sits as the 15th highest-grossing non-English film of all time. The film grossed about 369 million yuan (51.62 million U.S. dollars) on its second day of screening. It grossed one billion yuan in three days. The film earned more than 2 billion yuan on its opening weekend.

=== Critical response ===
Douban, a major Chinese media rating site, gave the drama 8.1 out of 10.
