= Asian Film Award for Best Newcomer =

Asian Film Awards

Asian Film Awards for Best Newcomer
- Awarded for: Best performance in Asian Cinema by a Newcomer
- Presented by: Hong Kong International Film Festival Society
- First award: 2007
- Final award: 2022
- Winner (2022): Mak Pui-tung (Hong Kong)
- Website: www.asianfilmawards.asia

Asian Film Award for Best Newcomer has been awarded annually since 2009 by the Hong Kong International Film Festival Society.

== Winners and nominees ==
=== 2000s ===
Year	Winner and nominees	English title	Original title
2009	(China) Yu Shaoqun	Forever Enthralled	simplified Chinese: 梅兰芳; traditional Chinese: 梅蘭芳
2009	(Japan) Matsuda Shota	Boys Over Flowers: the Movie	Japanese: 花より男子ファイナル (Hana yori dango: Fainaru)
2009	(Taiwan) Sandrine Pinna	Miao Miao	Chinese: 渺渺
2009	(South Korea) So Ji-sub	Rough Cut	Korean: 영화는 영화다
2009	(China) Xu Jiao	CJ7	traditional Chinese: 長江七號; simplified Chinese: 长江七号
2009	(Thailand) Yanin Vismistananda	Chocolate	Thai: ช็อคโกแลต

=== 2010s ===
Year	Winner and nominees	English title	Original title
2010	(Malaysia) Ng Meng Hui	At the End of Daybreak	心魔 Sham Moh
2010	(India) Sonam Kapoor	Delhi 6	
2010	(South Korea) Kim Sae-ron	A Brand New Life	여행자
2010	(China) Li Yuchun	Bodyguards and Assassins	
2010	(China) Zhu Xuan	Prince of Tears	
2011	(Taiwan) / (Canada) Mark Chao	Monga	
2011	(Hong Kong) Aarif Lee	Echoes of the Rainbow	
2011	(India) Omkar Das Manikpuri	Peepli Live	
2011	(South Korea) Choi Seung-hyun (T.O.P)	71: Into the Fire	
2011	(China) Zhou Dongyu	Under the Hawthorn Tree	
2012	(China) Ni Ni	The Flowers of War	
2012	(Taiwan) Ko Chen-tung	You Are the Apple of My Eye	
2012	(Taiwan) Eric Lin Hui-min	Starry Starry Night	
2012	(Japan) Maeda Ohshiro	I Wish	奇跡
2012	(Indonesia) Gita Novalista	The Mirror Never Lies	
2013	(China) Qi Xi	Mystery	
2013	(Taiwan) Jian Man-shu	When a Wolf Falls in Love with a Sheep	
2013	(Japan) Higashide Masahiro	The Kirishima Thing	桐島、部活やめるってよ
2013	(Taiwan) Huang Yu-siang	Touch of the Light	
2013	(South Korea) Kim Sung-kyun	Nameless Gangster: Rules of the Time	
2014	(China) Jiang Shuying	So Young	致我们终将逝去的青春
2014	(Hong Kong) Babyjohn Choi	The Way We Dance	狂舞派
2014	(Japan) Misaki Kinoshita	The Backwater	共喰い Tomogui
2014	(Japan) Keita Ninomiya	Like Father, Like Son	そして父になる Soshite Chichi ni Naru
2014	(South Korea) Yim Si-wan	The Attorney	변호인 Byeonhoin
2015	(China) Zhang Huiwen	Coming Home	歸來
2015	(Taiwan) Zhan Huai-yun	Meeting Dr. Sun	行動代號 孫中山
2015	(South Korea) Do Kyung-soo	Cart	카트 Kateu
2015	(Japan) Hiroomi Tosaka	Hot Road	ホットロード
2015	(Hong Kong) Ivana Wong	Golden Chickensss	金雞SSS
2016	(Hong Kong) Jessie Li	Port of Call	踏血尋梅
2016	(South Korea) Kim Seol-hyun	Gangnam Blues	강남 1970
2016	(Taiwan) Lee Hong-chi	Thanatos, Drunk	醉.生夢死
2016	(Japan) Ryōko Fujino	Solomon's Perjury	ソロモンの偽証
2016	(India) (France) Vicky Kaushal	Masaan	
2016	(Thailand) Waruntorn Paonil	Snap	
2017	(South Korea) Kim Tae-ri	The Handmaiden	아가씨
2017	(Japan) Takara Sakumoto	Rage	怒り
2017	(Singapore) Firdaus Rahman	Apprentice	
2017	(Hong Kong) Tony Wu	Weeds on Fire	點五步
2017	(China) Lin Yun	The Mermaid	美人鱼
2018	(Thailand) Chutimon Chuengcharoensukying	Bad Genius	ฉลาดเกมส์โกง
2018	(Taiwan) Zhou Meijun	Angels Wear White	嘉年华
2018	(South Korea) Im Yoon-ah	Confidential Assignment	공조
2018	(Hong Kong) Ling Man-lung	Tomorrow Is Another Day	黃金花
2018	(Japan) Akari Kinoshita	Wilderness	あゝ、荒野
2018	(China) Elane Zhong	Youth	芳华
2019	(China) Huang Jingyu	Operation Red Sea	红海行动
2019	(Japan) Erika Karata	Asako I & II	寝ても覚めても
2019	(South Korea) Jeon Jong-seo	Burning	버닝
2019	(Taiwan) Zhang Ying Xie	Cities of Last Things	幸福城市
2019	(China) HUANG Yao	The Crossing	
2019	(Hong Kong) Peter Chan	Three Husbands	三夫

=== 2020s ===
Year	Winner and nominees	English title	Original title
2020	(China) Jackson Yee	Better Days	少年的你
2020	(Taiwan) Fandy Fan	We Are Champions	下半場
2020	(Laos) Anong Houngheuangsy	Days	日子
2020	(South Korea) Kim Hye-jun	Another Child	미성년
2020	(Japan) Sakurako Konishi	First Love	初恋
2021	(China) Liu Haocun	One Second	秒钟
2021	(South Korea) Gong Seung-yeon	Aloners	혼자 사는 사람들
2021	(Japan) Misaki Hattori	Midnight Swan	ミッドナイトスワン
2021	(Iran) Rouhollah Zamani	Sun Children	خورشید
2021	(Taiwan) Buffy Chen	The Silent Forest	無聲
2022	(Hong Kong) Mak Pui-tung	The Sparring Partner	正義迴廊
2022	(South Korea) Lee Ji-eun	Broker	브로커
2022	(Hong Kong) Louise Wong	Anita	梅艷芳
2022	(China) Yang En You	Lighting Up the Stars	人生大事
2022	(Cambodia) Park Ji-min	Return to Seoul	Retour à Séoul
