= List of 2022 box office number-one films in China =

The following is a list of 2022 box office number-one films in China.

== Number-one films ==
†	This implies the highest-grossing movie of the year.

#	Date	Film	Box-office gross (week-end) (US$)	Notes
1	January 9, 2022	Embrace Again	$11,020,000	
2	January 16, 2022	The Matrix Resurrections	$7,520,000	
3	January 23, 2022	Embrace Again	$5,220,000	
4	January 30, 2022	Sheep Without a Shepherd	$4,040,000	
5	February 6, 2022	The Battle at Lake Changjin II †	$154,510,000	
6	February 13, 2022	The Battle at Lake Changjin II †	$44,170,000	
7	February 20, 2022	The Battle at Lake Changjin II †	$19,650,000	
8	February 27, 2022	The Battle at Lake Changjin II †	$10,960,000	
9	March 6, 2022	The Battle at Lake Changjin II †	$7,470,000	
10	March 13, 2022	The Battle at Lake Changjin II †	$4,360,000	
11	March 20, 2022	The Batman	$11,470,000	
12	March 27, 2022	Moonfall	$9,740,000	
13	April 3, 2022	Moonfall	$3,070,000	
14	April 10, 2022	Fantastic Beasts: The Secrets of Dumbledore	$9,600,000	
15	April 17, 2022	Fantastic Beasts: The Secrets of Dumbledore	$2,930,000	
16	April 24, 2022	Fantastic Beasts: The Secrets of Dumbledore	$1,670,000	
17	May 1, 2022	Stay With Me	$8,330,000	
18	May 8, 2022	The Bad Guys	$2,560,000	
19	May 15, 2022	The Bad Guys	$3,950,000	
20	May 22, 2022	Love Will Tear Us Apart	$5,830,000	
21	May 29, 2022	Doraemon: Nobita's Little Star Wars 2021	$2,970,000	
22	June 5, 2022	Unrequited Love	$7,200,000	
23	June 12, 2022	Jurassic World Dominion	$52,380,000	
24	June 19, 2022	Jurassic World Dominion	$23,350,000	
25	June 26, 2022	Jurassic World Dominion	$12,510,000	
26	July 3, 2022	Lighting Up the Stars	$44,290,000	
27	July 10, 2022	Lighting Up the Stars	$27,870,000	
28	July 17, 2022	Detective vs Sleuths	$18,260,000	
29	July 24, 2022	Detective vs Sleuths	$14,310,000	
30	July 31, 2022	Moon Man	$130,190,000	
31	August 7, 2022	Moon Man	$60,200,000	
32	August 14, 2022	Moon Man	$32,130,000	
33	August 21, 2022	New Gods: Yang Jian	$19,880,000	
34	August 28, 2022	New Gods: Yang Jian	$13,090,000	
35	September 4, 2022	Return to Dust	$5,390,000	
36	September 11, 2022	Give Me Five	$21,760,000	
37	September 18, 2022	Give Me Five	$7,250,000	
38	September 25, 2022	Give Me Five	$6,180,000	
39	October 2, 2022	Home Coming	$62,940,000	
40	October 9, 2022	Home Coming	$22,820,000	
41	October 16, 2022	Home Coming	$12,750,000	
42	October 23, 2022	Home Coming	$8,300,000	
43	October 30, 2022	Home Coming	$5,600,000	
44	November 6, 2022	Home Coming	$4,040,000	
45	November 13, 2022	The Tipping Point	$9,420,000	
46	November 20, 2022	Detective Conan: The Bride of Halloween	$12,100,000	
47	November 27, 2022	Detective Conan: The Bride of Halloween	$3,590,000	
48	December 4, 2022	One Piece Film: Red	$8,300,000	
49	December 11, 2022	One Piece Film: Red	$4,970,000	
50	December 18, 2022	Avatar: The Way of Water	$56,798,896	
51	December 25, 2022	Avatar: The Way of Water	$26,930,000	
52	January 1, 2023	Avatar: The Way of Water	$37,760,000	

== Highest-grossing films of 2022 ==
Highest-grossing films of 2022 (In-year release)
Rank	Title	Distributor	Domestic gross
1.	The Battle at Lake Changjin II	Bona Film Group	$626,000,000
2.	Avatar: The Way of Water	Disney	$245,996,272
3.	Too Cool to Kill	Mahua FunAge	$217,000,000
4.	Nice View	N/A	$211,000,000
5.	Jurassic World Dominion	Universal Pictures	$157,619,567
6.	The Bad Guys	Universal Pictures	$49,575,000
7.	Minions: The Rise of Gru	Universal Pictures	$34,729,911
8.	Fantastic Beasts: The Secrets of Dumbledore	Warner Bros.	$29,100,000
9.	The Batman	Warner Bros.	$25,300,000
10.	Moonfall	Lionsgate	$22,452,648

== See also ==
- 2022 in China
- 2022 in film
- List of Chinese films of 2022

Preceded by 2021 Box office number-one films	Box office number-one films 2022	Succeeded by 2025 Box office number-one films
