= China Snow Town =

Town in Heilongjiang, China

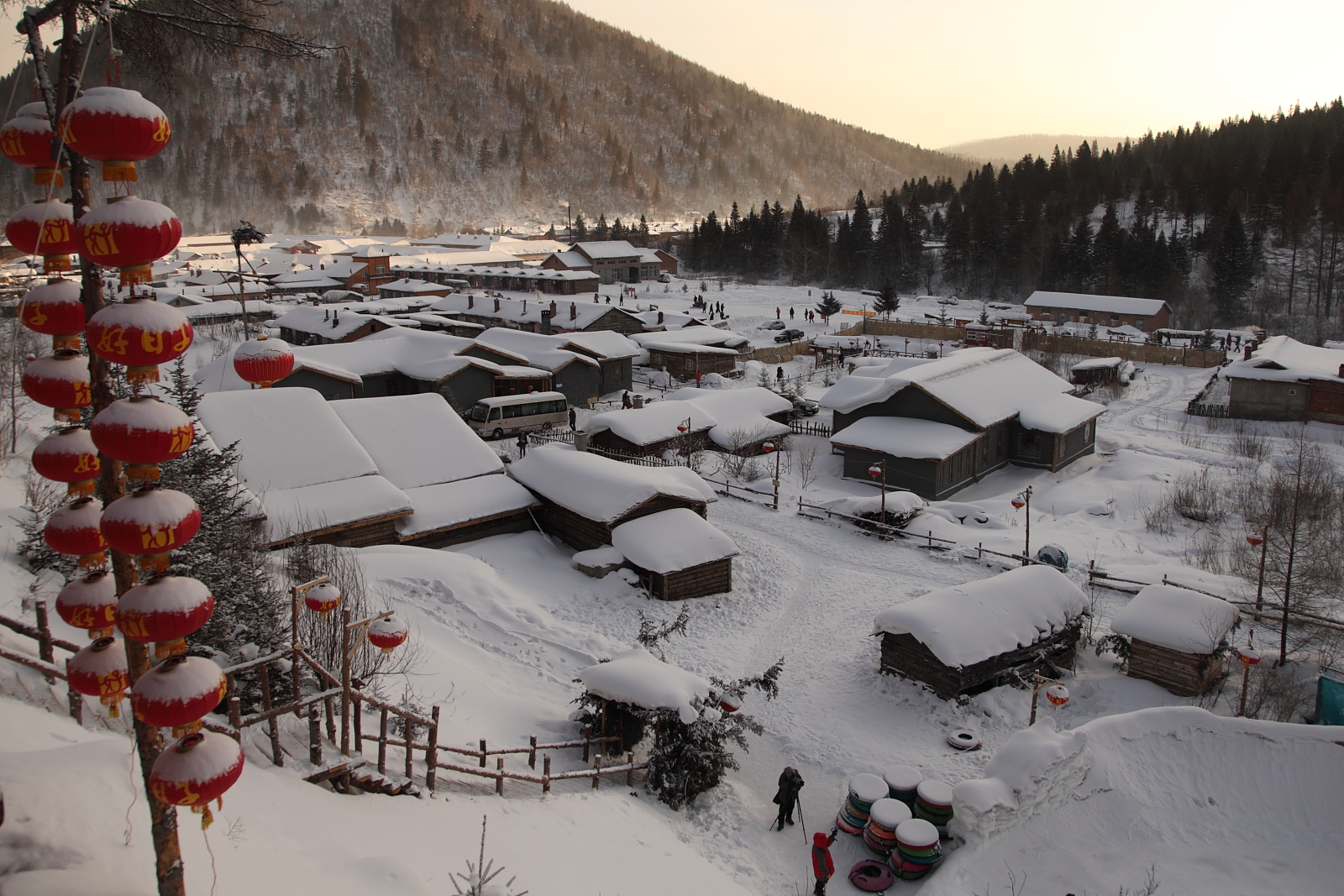
- Morning in China Snow Town.

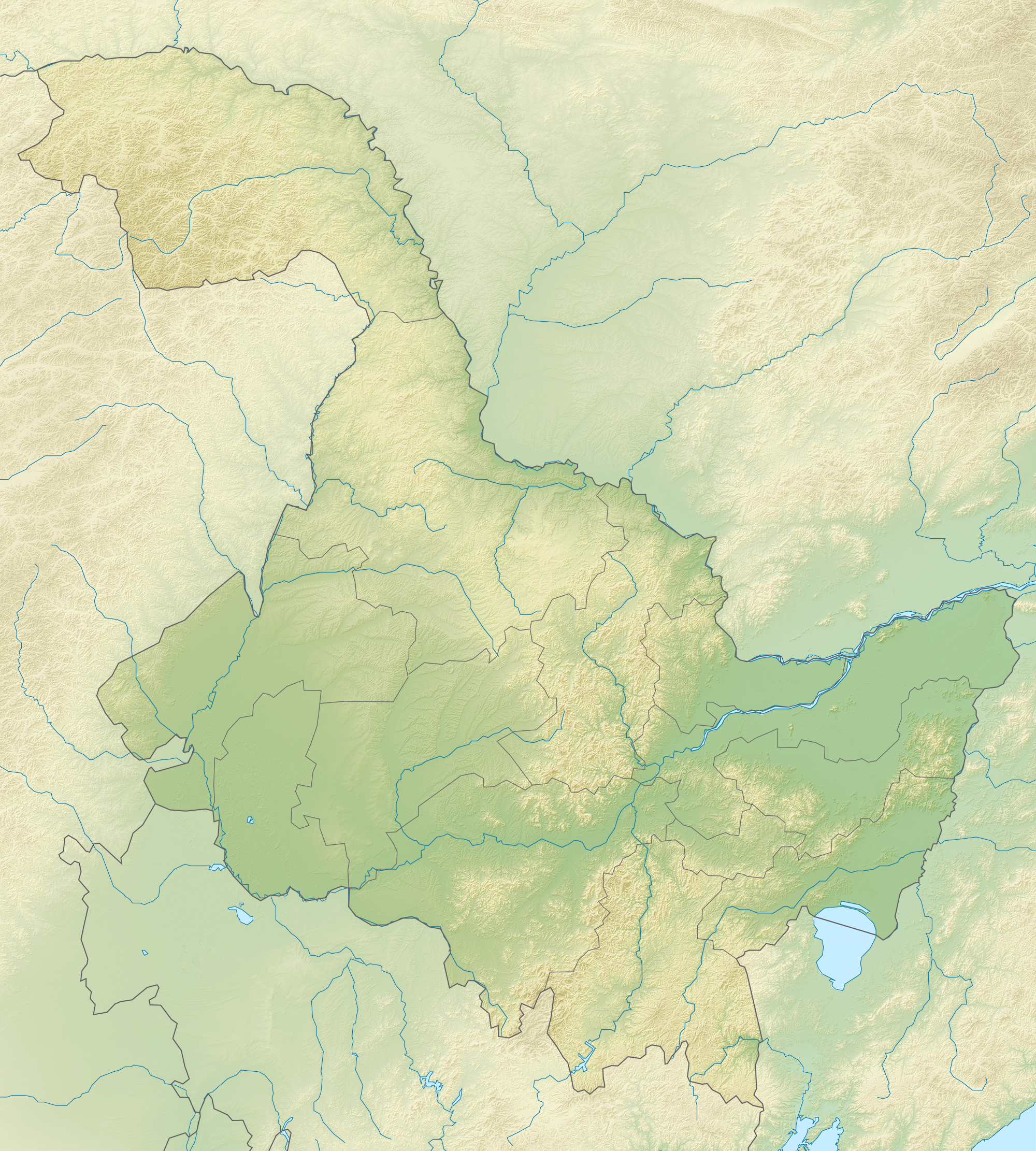
- Location within Heilongjiang
- Interactive map of China Snow Town
- Type: town
- Location: Xuexiang National Forest Park, Hailin, Heilongjiang
- Coordinates: 44°20′N 128°12′E
- Area: 179.16-square-kilometre (69.17 sq mi)
- Operator: Dahailin Forestry Bureau
- Open: All year
- Website: zhongguoxuexiang.com/guanyuwomen/jingqugaikuang/

Chinese name
- Simplified Chinese: 雪乡国家森林公园
- Traditional Chinese: 雪鄉國家森林公園
Transcriptions
Standard Mandarin
- Hanyu Pinyin: Xuěxiāng Guójiā Sēnlín Gōngyuán

The China Snow Town (中国雪乡), officially named Bimodal Forest Farm (大海林局双峰林场), is a small town located in the Xuexiang National Forest Park, Hailin, Heilongjiang, China. It is one of the most emblematic snow-related touristic attractions in China.

== Climate ==
The town has low temperatures, especially in winter, where falling snow is common and average temperature in January is -18.3°C (-0.94°F) and February -10.4°C (13.28°F).

== Film and television ==
Many Chinese TV series have been filmed at the China Snow Town, including Brave Journey to Northeast China (闯关东), Taking of Tiger Mountain 3D (智取威虎山3D) Where Are We Going, Dad? (爸爸去哪儿), The North Wind Blows (北风那个吹) and Tracks in The Snowy Forest (林海雪原).
