= List of 2025 box office number-one films in China =

The following is a list of 2025 box office number-one films in China.

== Number-one films ==
#	Date	Film	Box-office gross (week-end) (US$)	Notes
1	5 January 2025	Mufasa: The Lion King	$792,626	
2	12 January 2025	Sonic the Hedgehog 3	$1,800,000	
3	19 January 2025	Sonic the Hedgehog 3	$1,100,000	
4	26 January 2025	Mufasa: The Lion King	$448,339	

== Highest-grossing films of 2025 ==
Highest-grossing films of 2025 (In-year release) as of 17 February
Rank	Title	Distributor	Gross
1.	Ne Zha 2	Beijing Enlight Pictures	$2,261,176,000
2	Detective Chinatown 1900	Wanda Media	$443,280,000
3	Creation of the Gods II: Demon Force	CMC Pictures (China)	$160,310,000
4.	Boonie Bears: Future Reborn	Fantawild	$101,540,000
5.	Legends of the Condor Heroes: The Gallants	China Film Group Corporation	$89,350,000

== See also ==
- 2025 in China
- 2025 in film
- List of Chinese films of 2025

Preceded by 2022 Box office number-one films	Box office number-one films 2025	Succeeded by 2026 Box office number-one films
