= Golden Rooster Award for Best Foreign Language Film =

Chinese Film Awards

Golden Rooster Awards for Best Foreign Language Film
- Awarded for: Best Foreign Language Film
- Country: China
- Presented by: China Film Association; China Federation of Literary and Art Circles; Xiamen Municipal People's Government; 1905.com
- First award: 2021
- Winner (2025): There's Still Tomorrow
- Website: Golden Rooster Awards

Golden Rooster Award for Best Foreign Language Film (Chinese: 中国电影金鸡奖最佳外语片) is the main category of Competition of Golden Rooster Awards, awarding to foreign language films. When the first Golden Rooster Awards ceremony was held in 1981, there was no separate category for foreign language films because its awards were only given to domestic. It was created in 2021 for foreign language speaking films.

== 2020s ==
Year	English title	Chinese title
2021 (34th)	The Father	困在时间里的父亲
2021 (34th)	Pinocchio	匹诺曹
2021 (34th)	Persian Lessons	波斯语课
2021 (34th)	Wolfwalkers	狼行者
2021 (34th)	Happy Old Year	就爱断舍离
2022 (35th)	Father	漫漫寻子路
2022 (35th)	Ice 2	花滑女王2：爸爸我爱你
2022 (35th)	We Made a Beautiful Bouquet	花束般的恋爱
2022 (35th)	Downton Abbey: A New Era	唐顿庄园2
2022 (35th)	The Banker	银行家
2023 (36th)	Notre-Dame on Fire	燃烧的巴黎圣母院
2023 (36th)	A Man Called Otto	超難搞先生
2023 (36th)	Memoria	记忆
2023 (36th)	The Son	愛·子
2023 (36th)	Fall	墜
2024 (37th)	Oppenheimer	奥本海默
2024 (37th)	Mother's Instinct	母亲的直觉
2024 (37th)	Dune: Part Two	沙丘2
2024 (37th)	Kim's Video	金的音像店
2024 (37th)	The Challenge	挑战
2025 (38th)	There's Still Tomorrow	还有明天
2025 (38th)	F1	F1：狂飙飞车
2025 (38th)	Here	此心安处
2025 (38th)	I'm Still Here	我仍在此
2025 (38th)	How to Make Millions Before Grandma Dies	姥姥的外孙
