= Wedding Bible (gift) =

A wedding Bible is a Bible either used for officiating in some wedding ceremonies, or a special edition gift presented to the couple. Oxford University Press produced The Oxford Wedding Bible in 2003.
