= The Pioneer (2021 film) =

- 革命者
- Directed by: Xu Zhanxiong
- Written by: Guan Hu; Wu Bing; Zhang Ke; Jing Yu
- Produced by: Guan Hu
- Starring: Zhang Songwen; Li Yifeng; Tong Liya; Peng Yuchang; Qin Hao
- Release date: 1 July 2021
- Running time: 121 minutes
- Country: China
- Language: Mandarin

The Pioneer (Chinese: 革命者; pinyin: Gémìng Zhě) is a 2021 Chinese biographical historical drama directed by Xu Zhanxiong and produced by Guan Hu, starring Zhang Songwen as Li Dazhao, a pioneer to spread Marxism and Communism in China and one of the founders of the Chinese Communist Party. The rest of the main cast includes Li Yifeng, Tong Liya, Peng Yuchang, and Qin Hao. The film premiered in China on 1 July 2021, to commemorate the 100th anniversary of the Chinese Communist Party.

== Cast ==
- Zhang Songwen as Li Dazhao
- Li Yifeng as Mao Zedong
- Tong Liya as Zhao Renlan, wife of Li Dazhao.
- Peng Yuchang as Zhang Xueliang
- Qin Hao as Chen Duxiu
- Bai Ke as Xu San
- Zhang Ruonan as Li Xinglan
- Xin Yunlai as Deng Zhongxia
- Sun Xilun as Ah Chen

== Production ==
The planning of The Pioneer was launched in March 2018. The film began production in Shanghai on 27 December 2020.

== Release ==
The Pioneer was slated for release on 1 July 2021 in China.

== Accolades ==
Date	Award	Category	Recipient(s) and nominee(s)	Result	Notes
2021	34th Golden Rooster Awards	Best Picture	The Pioneer	Nominated	
2021	34th Golden Rooster Awards	Best Writing	Guan Hu, Wu Bing, Zhang Ke and Jing Yu	Nominated	
2021	34th Golden Rooster Awards	Best Art Direction	Huo Tingxiao	Won	
2021	34th Golden Rooster Awards	Best Music	Dou Peng	Nominated	
2021	34th Golden Rooster Awards	Best Editing	Yang Hongyu	Nominated	
