= Xuexiang National Forest Park =

Forest park in Hailin, China

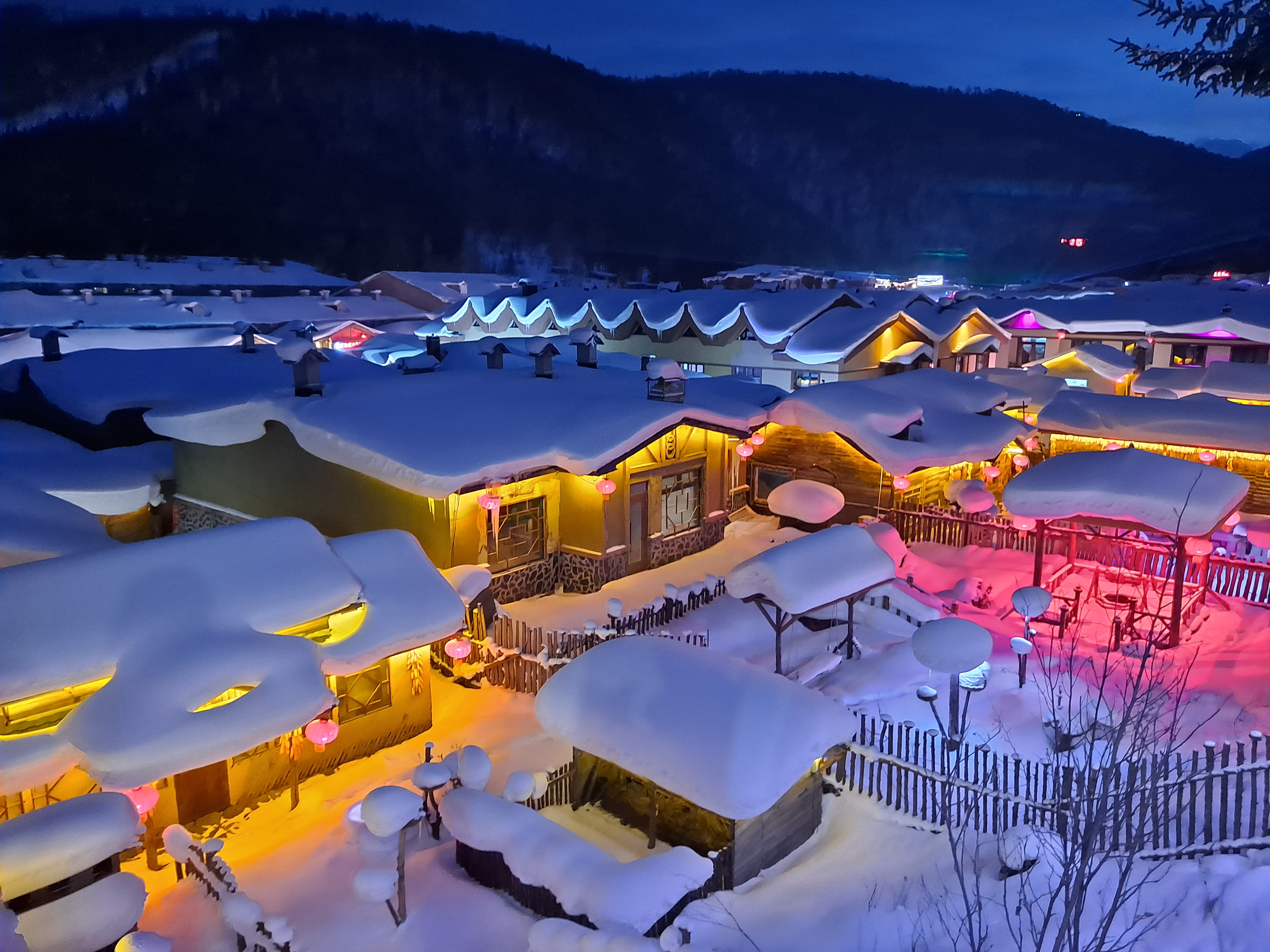
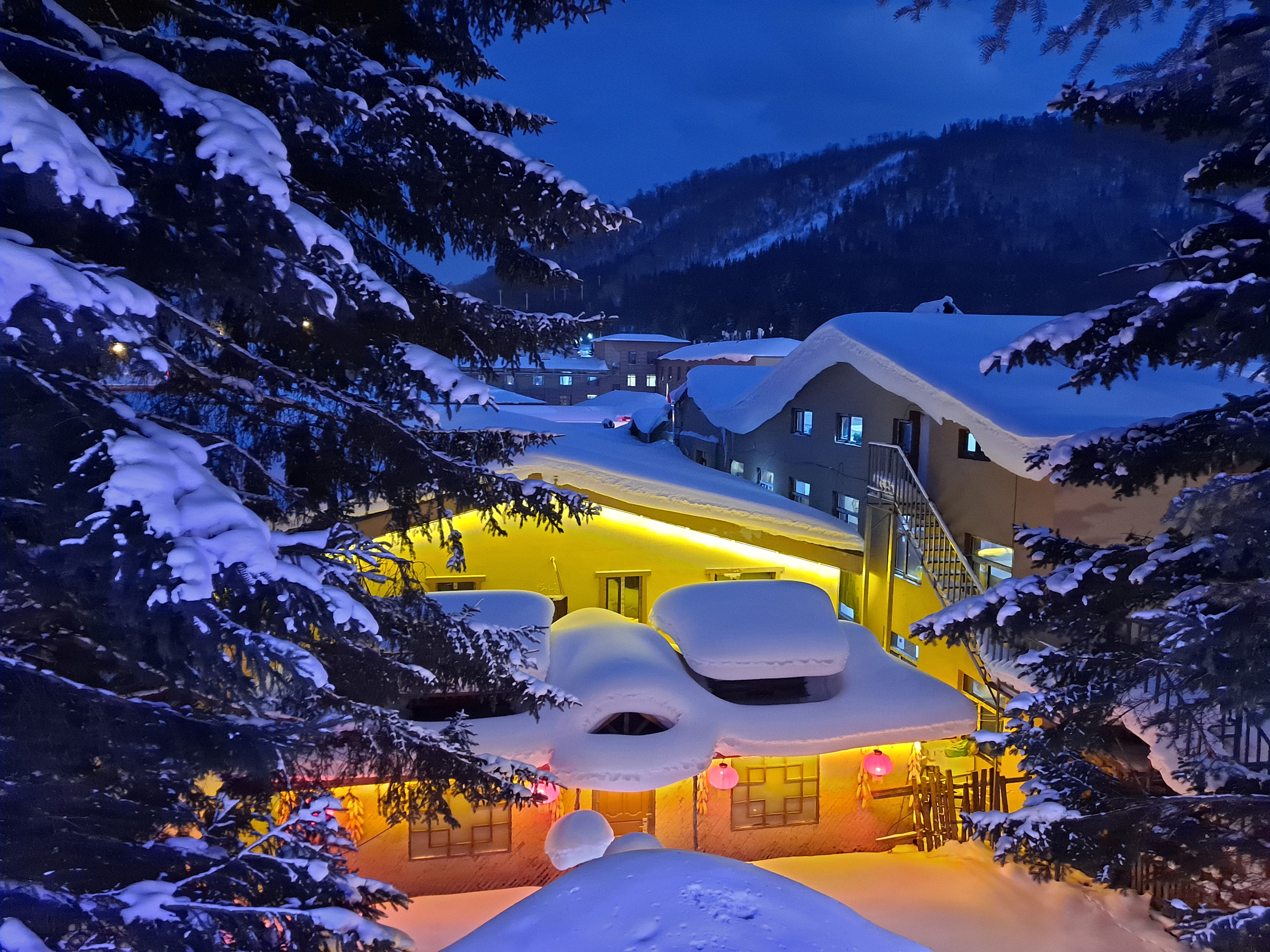
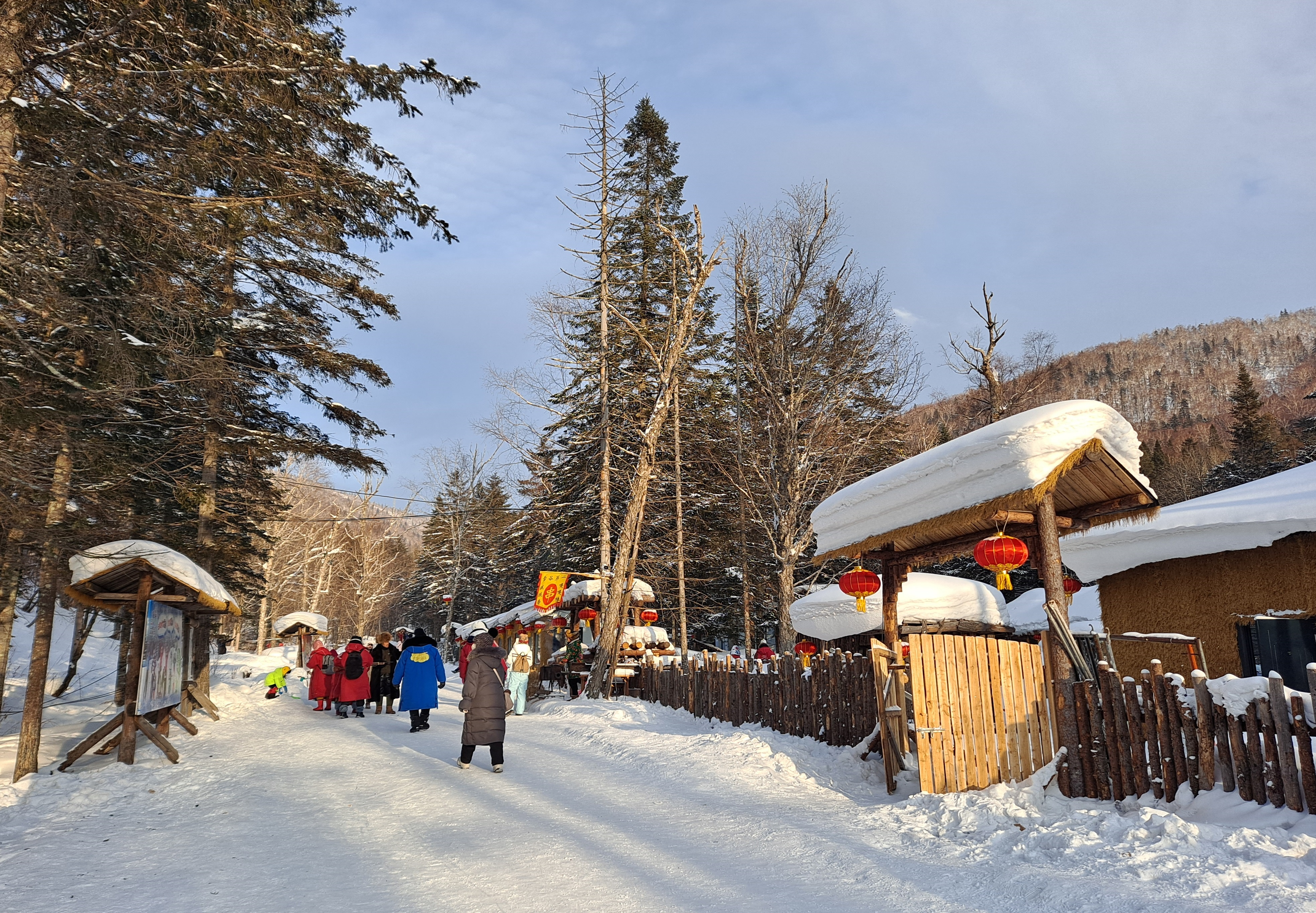
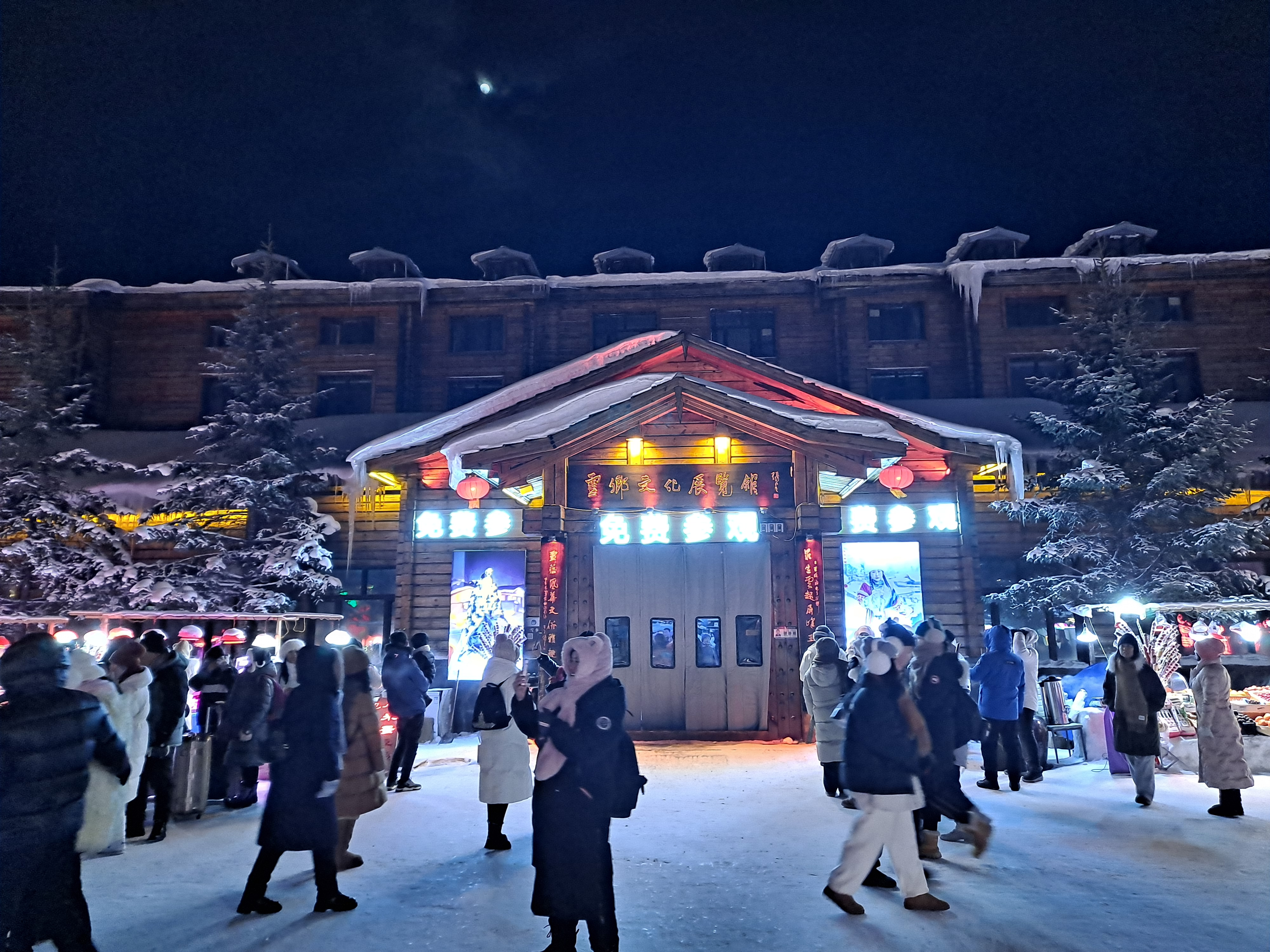
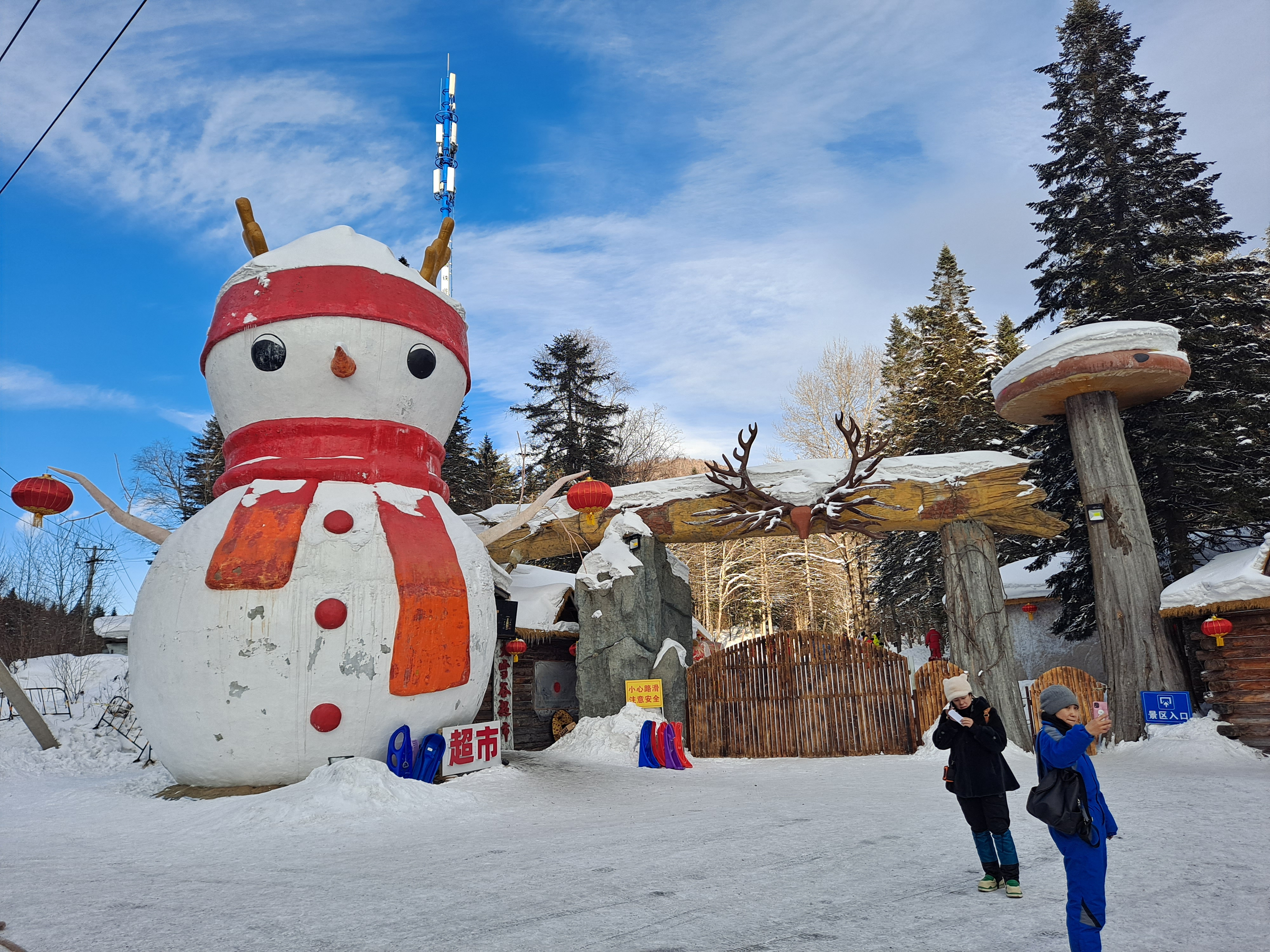

- Location within Heilongjiang
- Type: State park
- Location: Changting township, Hailin, Heilongjiang
- Coordinates: 44°20′N 128°12′E
- Area: 179.16-square-kilometre (69.17 sq mi)
- Created: 1948
- Operator: Dahailin Forestry Bureau
- Open: All year

Chinese name
- Simplified Chinese: 雪乡国家森林公园
- Traditional Chinese: 雪鄉國家森林公園
Transcriptions
Standard Mandarin
- Hanyu Pinyin: Xuěxiāng Guójiā Sēnlín Gōngyuán

Xuexiang National Forest Park (Chinese: 雪乡国家森林公园) is a national forest park in Changting township, Hailin, Heilongjiang, China. The Xuexiang National Forest Park occupies a large area that includes both the China Snow Town and a vast underdeveloped forest preservation area that surrounds the central touristic town.

== History ==
The national forest park was established in 1948. Since October 2010, it has been categorized as an AAAA level tourist site by the China National Tourism Administration.

=== Xuexiang overcharging incident ===
During the winter solstice of 2017 and 2018, a customer complaint of overcharging occurred in Xuexiang. On December 29, 2017, the public WeChat account Yimumu (Note: Chinese: 一木木) published an article in which the author claims he and his party encountered hotel fraud and malicious overcharging of guests while visiting Xuexiang.

== Climate ==
Snow falls every October to April of next year.

== Tourist attractions ==
- China Snow Town Scenic Spot (Chinese: 中国雪乡风景区)
- Primordial Forest Scenic Spot (原始林风景区)
- Hailang River Drifting Scenic Spot (海浪河漂流风景区)
- Lihuatun Scenic Spot (梨花邨风景区)
- Erlang River Scenic Spot (二浪河风景区)
- Dream Home (梦幻家园)
- Farm House (农家小院)
- Xuexiang Film and Television Base (雪乡影视基地)
- Xuexiang Cultural Exhibition Hall (雪乡文化展览馆)
- Mount Yangcao (羊草山)
- Great Snow Valley (大雪谷)
- Yaxue Post station (亚雪驿站)

== Film and television ==
The China Snow Town, inside the Xuexiang National Forest Park, was used for location filming of the 2013 reality TV show Where Are We Going, Dad?.

== See also ==
- List of protected areas of China
