= One Second (film) =

2020 Chinese-Hong Kong film by Zhang Yimou

- Theatrical release poster
- Simplified Chinese: 一秒钟
- Hanyu Pinyin: Yī miǎo zhōng
- Directed by: Zhang Yimou
- Screenplay by: Zhang Yimou; Zou Jingzhi
- Based on: The Criminal Lu Yanshi by Geling Yan
- Produced by: Ping Dong; William Kong; Liwei Pang; Shaokun Xiang
- Starring: Zhang Yi; Liu Haocun; Fan Wei
- Cinematography: Zhao Xiaoding
- Edited by: Yuan Du
- Music by: Loudboy
- Production companies: Huanxi Media Group; Edko Films
- Distributed by: Edko Films
- Release date: 27 November 2020
- Running time: 104 minutes
- Countries: China; Hong Kong
- Language: Mandarin
- Box office: US$20.3 million

One Second (Chinese: 一秒钟) is a 2020 drama film directed by Zhang Yimou, about a man who escapes from a Laogai camp during the Cultural Revolution. The film is co-produced by China and Hong Kong, and based on the novel The Criminal Lu Yanshi, by author Geling Yan. Yan is not credited in the film, which has led to controversy.

== Plot ==
In 1969, during China's Cultural Revolution, a man known only as "the fugitive" is sent to a remote labor reform camp in northwestern China after clashing with a rebel faction leader. His wife divorces him, and his daughter severs ties. In 1975, he learns that his 14-year-old daughter died in an accident while participating in a school labor activity, her efforts captured in Issue No. 22 of the News Bulletin. Desperate to see her one last time, he escapes the camp in hopes of catching the reel at a rural screening.

At the second farm division, an orphan named Liu and her younger brother struggle to survive after their mother dies and their father abandons them. In a bid to replace a burned lampshade made from film, Liu steals a reel of Heroic Sons and Daughters. The fugitive witnesses the theft and retrieves the reel, but it is stolen again. Their paths continue to cross as both become entangled in the pursuit of the lost News Bulletin reel.

The projectionist Fan, who holds power through control of film screenings, learns the reel has been damaged and secretly blames the deliveryman. He mobilizes villagers to clean and dry the film using improvised methods. The fugitive confronts Fan at knifepoint, demanding to see the reel. Eventually, the film is screened, and in a fleeting second, he spots his daughter. Overcome with emotion, he asks for the clip to be replayed.

Meanwhile, security officers arrive after being tipped off. Mistaking Liu for the fugitive's accomplice, they beat and detain her. Realizing the error, the fugitive returns to defend her, and the two are tied up together. Fan screens Heroic Sons and Daughters again for them. Moved by the film's father-daughter reunion, the guards are brought to tears. Liu, tearfully, confesses she misses her own father.

The next morning, as the fugitive is escorted back to the camp, Fan discreetly slips him two frames of film featuring his daughter. Liu waves to him from afar, holding a film-lamp he left her. When the guards find the hidden frames, they discard them in the sand. The fugitive shouts in anguish as Liu retrieves them.

== Cast ==
- Zhang Yi as Fugitive
- Liu Haocun as Orphan Liu
- Fan Wei as Fan
- Yu Ailei as Cui
- Li Yan as Yang He
- Zhang Shaobo as Liu's brother

== Release ==
One Second was released in Chinese theatres on 27 November 2020 (with previews on 26 November 2020).

It was selected to compete for the Golden Bear at the 69th Berlin International Film Festival, but was withdrawn shortly before the screening. The official explanation for the withdrawal is "technical difficulties encountered during post-production", but critics suspected politically motivated censorship.

It would later screen as a gala presentation at the 2021 Toronto International Film Festival, with Neon acquiring the film's US distribution rights prior to the festival. After also screening at the 2021 Sydney Film Festival, the film was released in Australia by Rialto Distribution on 20 January 2022.

== Reception ==
=== Critical response ===
On the review aggregator website Rotten Tomatoes, 100% of 25 critics' reviews are positive, with an average rating of 7.4/10. Metacritic assigned the film a weighted average score of 79 out of 100, based on 4 critics, indicating "generally favorable reviews".

=== Accolades ===
Year	Awards	Category	Recipient(s)	Result	Ref.
2021	15th Asian Film Awards	Best Film	One Second	Nominated	
2021	15th Asian Film Awards	Best Director	Zhang Yimou	Won	
2021	15th Asian Film Awards	Best Actor	Zhang Yi	Nominated	
2021	15th Asian Film Awards	Best Newcomer	Liu Haocun	Won	
2021	15th Asian Film Awards	Best Music	Lao Zai	Nominated	
2021	30th Huading Awards	Best Director	Zhang Yimou	Nominated	
2021	30th Huading Awards	Best Actor	Zhang Yi	Nominated	
2021	30th Huading Awards	Best Supporting Actor	Fan Wei	Nominated	
2021	34th Golden Rooster Awards	Best Supporting Actor	Fan Wei	Won	
2021	34th Golden Rooster Awards	Best Art Direction	Lin Chaoxiang	Nominated	
2021	34th Golden Rooster Awards	Best Sound Recording	Tao Jing	Won	
