= My Country, My Parents =

- Film poster
- Traditional Chinese: 我和我的父輩
- Simplified Chinese: 我和我的父辈
- Hanyu Pinyin: wǒ hé wǒ de fùbèi
- Directed by: Wu Jing; Zhang Ziyi; Xu Zheng; Shen Teng
- Written by: Li Yuan; He Keke; Yu Baimei; Hua Weilin; Lin Bingbao; Xu Zheng
- Produced by: Fu Ruoqing; Zhang Huixia; Liu Kailuo; Liu Ruifang
- Starring: Wu Jing; Zhang Ziyi; Xu Zheng; Shen Teng
- Cinematography: Lai Yiu-fai; Yu Jing-pin; Cao Yu; Sun Ming
- Edited by: Li Dianshi; Tan Xiangyuan; Zhou Xiaolin; Cheung Ka-fai
- Music by: Fei Peng; Yu Fei; Zhang Yilin
- Production companies: China Film Co., Ltd.
- Release date: 30 September 2021 (China)
- Running time: 157 minutes
- Country: China
- Language: Mandarin
- Box office: $210.3 million

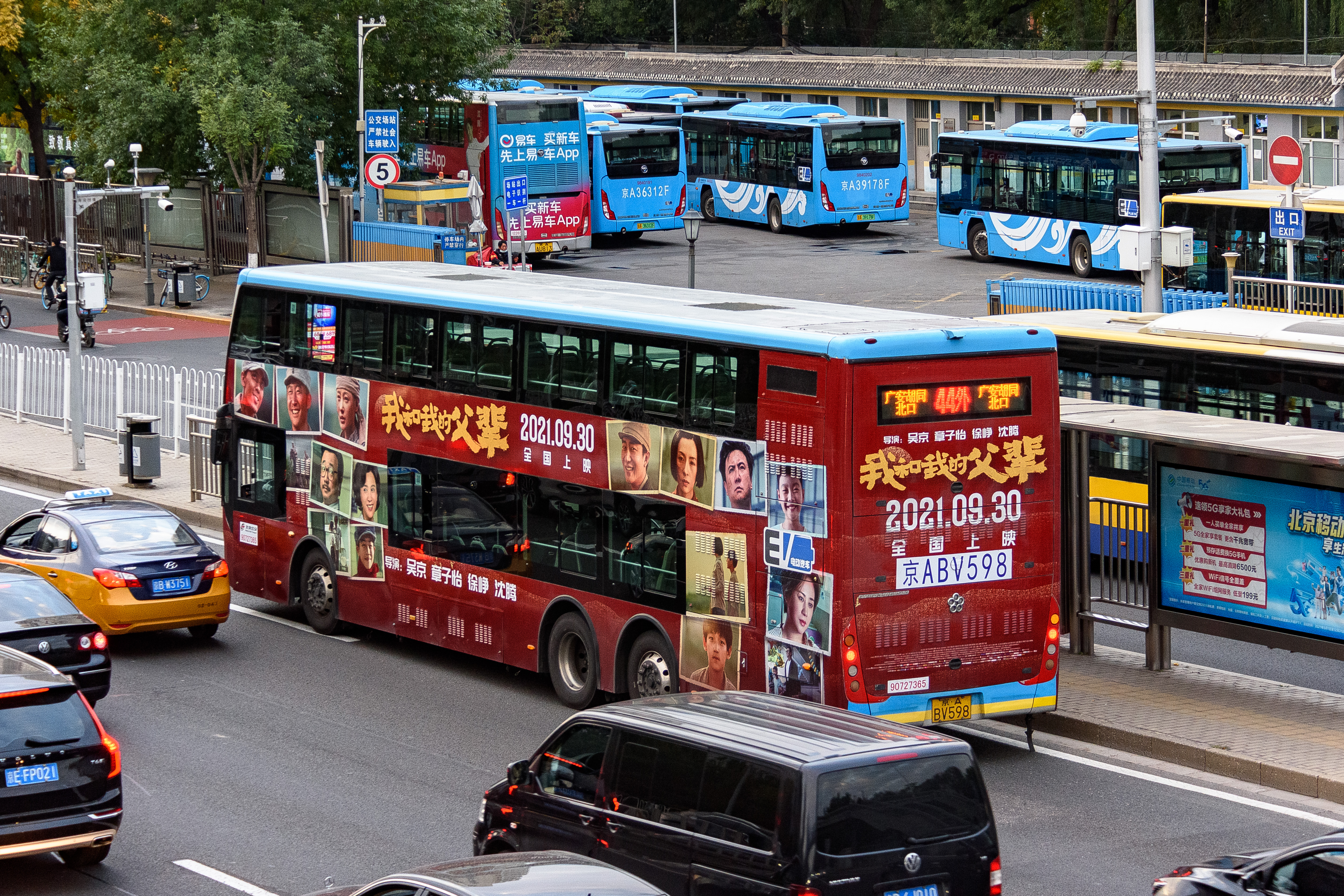
A bus with the advertisement of this film in Beijing

My Country, My Parents (Chinese: 我和我的父辈) is a 2021 Chinese three-part anthology drama film, consisting of four segments directed by four directors, Wu Jing, Zhang Ziyi, Xu Zheng, and Shen Teng. The four directors also star in their own stories, each covering a different genre and taking place in different periods from the Second Sino-Japanese War in 1942 to a futuristic world in 2050. The film became the third installment in a series that celebrates the founding of the People's Republic of China on 1 October 1949, with two prequels, My People, My Country and My People, My Homeland, released in 2019 and 2020, respectively. The film was released in China on September 30, 2021, to commemorate the 72nd anniversary of the establishment of the People's Republic of China.

== Plot ==
The film illustrates a concept of bloodline and spiritual inheritance, with four sections covering the War of Resistance Against Japan, the launching of China's first satellite, the making of China's first television commercial in the Reform and Opening Up era, and a humanoid from 2050 traveling back in time to 2021.

== Cast ==
=== Windriders (directed by Wu Jing) ===
- Wu Jing as Ma Renxing, commander of the Jizhong Cavalry Regiment
- Leo Wu as Ma Chengfeng, Ma Renxing's son, soldier in the Jizhong Cavalry Regiment
- Zhang Tian'ai as Da Chunzi
- Li Guangjie as Wang Nairong
- Vision Wei as Huang Rui
- Yu Ailei as Song Futing
- Lu Chang'en as a veteran
- Zhang Hengrui as Lü Bu
- Jiang Shui as Lao Rangzi
- Baina Risu as Shan Houzi

=== Poem (directed by Zhang Ziyi) ===
- Zhang Ziyi as Yu Kaiying, mother, gunpowder sculptor
- Huang Xuan as Shi Ruhong, father, rocket engine designer who meets his death in the line of duty.
- Chen Daoming as the elder brother (adult)
  - Yuan Jinhui as the elder brother
- Hai Qing as the younger sister (adult); astronaut
  - Ren Sinuo as the younger sister
- Li Naiwen as Zhang Xiaoping
- Peng Yuchang as the assistant
- Geng Le as the chief engineer
- Du Jiang as the natural father who also meets his death in the line of duty.

=== AD MAN (directed by Xu Zheng) ===
- Xu Zheng as Zhao Pingyang, director of the sales department of Shanghai No. 2 Traditional Chinese Medicine Factory
- Song Jia as Han Jingya, wife of Zhao Pingyang
- Zu Feng as Zhao Xiaodong
  - Han Haolin as younger Zhao Xiaodong
- Oho Ou as Xiao Ma, writer and director
- Tao Hong as Teacher Qian
- Zhang Guoqiang as head of Shanghai No. 2 Traditional Chinese Medicine Factory
- Fan Yujie as Xiao Mei
- Ni Hongjie as Su Ting, Xiao Mei's mother
- Jiao Shengxiang as Xiao Pang
- Jia Bing as father of Xiao Pang
- Zhang Yuqi as mother of Xiao Pang
- Ning Li as Master Feng
- Hu Ke
- Zhang Jianya as Grandpa Jiang
- Zhang Zhihua as Grandma Jiang
- Ma Shuliang as doctor
- Cao Kefan as director of TV station
- Wan Qian as shop employee
- Zhang Yimou as head of TV station

=== Go Youth (directed by Shen Teng) ===
- Shen Teng as Xing Yihao, bionic robot
- Wu Yuhan as Xiao Xiao
  - Hong Lie as younger Xiao Xiao, a primary schoolboy
- Ma Li as Ma Daiyu, Xiao Xiao's mother
- Chang Yuan as the 4S store manager
- Allen as the father of Wang Mingtu
- Lamu Yangzi as Xiao Xiao' teacher
- Zhang Xiaofei
- Li Xuejian as an old scientist

== Production ==
My Country, My Parents was funded by China Film Administration. Actors Wu Jing (Wolf Warrior, The Wandering Earth and The Battle at Lake Changjin), Zhang Ziyi (Crouching Tiger, Hidden Dragon), Xu Zheng (Dying to Survive), and Shen Teng (Hi, Mom) acted as directors and leads. Principal photography started in June 2021 and wrapped in July 2021.

== Music ==
No.	Title	Lyrics	Music	Singer	Length
1.	"Getting Wish (如愿)" (Promotion song)	Tang Tian	Qian Lei	Faye Wong
2.	"The Man who Gave Me the Stars (给我星辰的人)" (Opening song)	Li Cong	Chang Shilei	Lei Jia

== Release ==
My Country, My Parents was released in China on 30 September 2021.

My Country, My Parents released by China Media Capital (CMC) with English subtitles in theaters in over 30 cities across the United States and Canada.

== Reception ==
=== Box office ===
In 2021, the film ranked fourth in box office revenue in China. My Country, My Parents' grossed 400 million yuan ($62.22 million) in its first three days of release, by the weekend, the film's accumulated grossed reached 900 million yuan ($140 million). My Country, My Parents earned a total of 1.2 billion yuan ($186.66 million) in its first 12 days of release. As of October 18, My Country, My Parents earned $210 million, ranked second place of Chinese box office in the third week of October, after The Battle at Lake Changjin.
