= Cliff Walkers =

2021 Chinese spy film

- Theatrical release poster
- Traditional Chinese: 懸崖之上
- Simplified Chinese: 悬崖之上
- Literal meaning: on the cliff
- Hanyu Pinyin: xuányá zhīshàng
- Directed by: Zhang Yimou
- Written by: Quan Yongxian
- Produced by: Lin Liang; Pang Liwei
- Starring: Zhang Yi; Yu Hewei; Qin Hailu; Zhu Yawen; Liu Haocun
- Cinematography: Zhao Xiaoding
- Edited by: Li Yongyi
- Music by: Jo Yeong-wook
- Production companies: China Film Group Corporation; Emperor Group; Shanghai Film Group; Huaxia Film Distribution
- Release date: April 30, 2021 (China)
- Running time: 125 minutes
- Country: China
- Language: Mandarin
- Box office: US$185.2 million

Cliff Walkers (Chinese: 悬崖之上), previously titled Impasse in English, is a 2021 Chinese spy thriller film directed by Zhang Yimou and written by Quan Yongxian. It is set in the Imperial Japanese puppet state of Manchukuo in the 1930s before World War II erupts. It was selected as the Chinese entry for the Best International Feature Film at the 94th Academy Awards.

== Plot ==
Set in the Japanese puppet state of Manchukuo, the film follows four Chinese Communist Party agents who parachute back into Harbin in Northeastern China in the early 1930s. Together, they embark on a secret operation code-named “Utrenya” (Russian: утреня) that intends to extract a former prisoner who could expose crimes committed by the Imperial Japanese Army to the international community (e.g., unethical human experimentation and other crimes against humanity committed by Unit 731 of that army).

Upon landing, the team split into two groups to avoid being captured and forced to betray their mission or others in the group. They are also presented as being ready to sacrifice themselves, evidenced in part by their accepting pills from a match box bearing a Russian inscription, to ingest should they be caught.

Soon after separating, one group discovers that their local contacts are the covert opposition, falsely pretending to be compatriots. They manage to escape the trap, and realize they have been betrayed by a local co-conspirator intended to aid the four, after he witnessed the execution of others of the local conspiracy, then being tortured by electric shock, and being induced to answer his interrogators through the administration of drugs.

== Cast ==
- Zhang Yi as Zhang Xianchen, a former journalist-turned CPC agent
- Yu Hewei as Zhou Yi, a CPC agent embedded within the enemy
- Qin Hailu as Wang Yu, Zhang's wife and comrade
- Zhu Yawen as Chu Liang, Zhang's comrade
- Liu Haocun as Xiao Lan, Zhang's comrade and Chu's girlfriend
- Ni Dahong as Gao Bin, enemy in charge
- Li Naiwen as Gao's henchman
- Yu Ailei as Jin Zhide, Gao's henchman
- Lei Jiayin as Xie Zirong, a CPC agent-turned traitor

== Production ==
A conceptual poster was released in October 2019 during Pingyao International Film Festival. On Dec 13, 2019, the cameras started rolling in Xuexiang National Forest Park. The shooting wrapped on May 19, 2020.

The original score was composed by Jo Yeong-wook, whereas the eponymous theme song is composed by the band RadioMars and performed by Zhou Shen.

== Release ==
The movie was released on April 30, 2021, in both China and the United States. In China, it is released in IMAX, CINITY, Dolby Cinema, etc. In the United States, it is distributed by China Media Capital.

== Reception ==
=== Critical response ===
On review aggregator Rotten Tomatoes, the film holds an approval rating of 80% based on 51 reviews, with an average rating of 6.6/10. The website's critical consensus states: "Stylish and exciting, Cliff Walkers sees director Zhang Yimou trying his hand at the spy thriller genre with generally impressive results". On Metacritic, the film has a weighted average score of 64 out of 100, based on 10 critics, indicating "generally favorable reviews".

=== Awards and nominations ===
Year	Awards	Category	Recipient	Result	Ref.
2021	15th Asian Film Awards	Best Supporting Actor	Yu Hewei	Nominated	
2021	15th Asian Film Awards	Best Supporting Actress	Qin Hailu	Nominated	
2021	15th Asian Film Awards	Best Editing	Li Yongyi	Won	
2021	15th Asian Film Awards	Best Cinematography	Zhao Xiaoding	Nominated	
2021	15th Asian Film Awards	Best Costume Design	Chen Minzheng	Nominated	
2021	15th Asian Film Awards	Best Original Music	Jo Yeong-wook	Nominated	
2021	34th Golden Rooster Awards	Best Picture	Cliff Walkers	Nominated	
2021	34th Golden Rooster Awards	Best Director	Zhang Yimou	Won	
2021	34th Golden Rooster Awards	Best Cinematography	Zhao Xiaoding	Won	
2021	34th Golden Rooster Awards	Best Actor	Zhang Yi	Won	
2021	34th Golden Rooster Awards	Best Actor	Yu Hewei	Nominated	
2021	34th Golden Rooster Awards	Best Art Direction	Lin Mu	Nominated	
2021	34th Golden Rooster Awards	Best Sound Recording	Yang Jiang and Zhao Nan	Nominated	

== See also ==
- List of submissions to the 94th Academy Awards for Best International Feature Film
- List of Chinese submissions for the Academy Award for Best International Feature Film
