= Sister (2021 film) =

2021 Chinese coming of age drama film

- Theatrical release poster
- Chinese: 我的姐姐
- Literal meaning: My older sister
- Hanyu Pinyin: wǒ de jiějie
- Directed by: Yin Ruoxi
- Written by: You Xiaoying
- Produced by: Yin Lu
- Starring: Zhang Zifeng; Xiao Yang; Zhu Yuanyuan; Duan Bowen; Connor Leong
- Cinematography: Piao Songri
- Edited by: Zhu Lin
- Music by: Gao Xiaoyang
- Production company: Turan Studio
- Distributed by: China Film Group Corporation; Micro Dream; Lian Ray Pictures; Red Star Macalline Films; New Film Association
- Release date: 2 April 2021 (China)
- Running time: 127 minutes
- Country: China
- Languages: Standard Mandarin; Sichuanese
- Budget: CN¥30 million (~US$4.6 million)
- Box office: US$134.5 million

Sister, also known as My Sister (Chinese: 我的姐姐), is a 2021 Chinese coming-of-age drama film directed by Yin Ruoxi and written by You Xiaoying. It stars Zhang Zifeng in the titular lead role, with Xiao Yang, Zhu Yuanyuan, Duan Bowen, and Connor Leong as the other cast members. It was released in China on 2 April 2021. The film grossed US$52.8 million in its opening weekend, replacing Godzilla vs. Kong as the top film at the weekend Chinese box office.

The film has received positive reviews, with acclaim for Zhang's performance, and has sparked discussion about gender roles and traditional values in modern Chinese society.

== Premise ==
The film tells a story about the bond between an older sister and her younger brother. It was written and directed by You Xiaoying and Yin Ruoxi, both young female filmmakers. It examines themes of traditionalism in Chinese society, patriarchy, the traditional preference for sons over daughters, and filial piety.

== Plot ==
Elder sister An Ran was born into a family that desperately wanted a son. To obtain permission for another child, her parents falsely reported that she had a disability, claiming she was a cripple. Even when inspectors discovered the truth about her good health, her father brutally beat her to maintain the deception.

When applying for college, An Ran initially chose a clinical medicine program in Beijing, hoping to pursue a better future. However, her parents secretly altered her application to a nursing program in their hometown, believing that as a girl, she should start earning money and supporting the family as soon as possible. Determined to break free, An Ran saw pursuing a master's degree in Beijing as her only way out.

However, her carefully planned future is shattered when her parents die in a traffic accident, leaving behind her six-year-old younger brother. An Ran must decide whether to pursue her independence or bring up her 6-year-old half-brother.

== Cast ==
Performer	Character	Description
Zhang Zifeng	An Ran	an older sister
Jin Yaoyuan	An Ziheng	An Ran's younger brother
Xiao Yang	Wu Dongfeng	An Ran's uncle
Zhu Yuanyuan	An Rongrong	An Ran's aunt
Duan Bowen	Zhong Yong	driver in the accident
Connor Leong	Zhao Ming	An Ran's boyfriend

== Production ==
A small-budget film, Sister was shot in Chengdu from July to September 2020. Like Farewell, My Lad (再见，少年), the film is a collaboration between Zhang Zifeng and Yin Ruoxi.

The main theme song, "Sister", written by Zhang Chu and sung by Roy Wang, was released on 17 March 2021.

== Box office ==
The film was released on 2 April 2021, Qingming Festival weekend. In its opening weekend, the film grossed US$52.8 million, surpassing Godzilla vs. Kong's earnings in China the same weekend. The film's success has drawn comparisons to Hi, Mom, another woman-written and woman-directed family-focused film that exceeded expectations at the box office earlier the same year.

== Reception ==
The film received a 100 percent rating on Rotten Tomatoes based on five reviews, with an average rating of 7.5/10.

The film was well received by critics and audiences upon its release. Its themes sparked discussion about traditional values, gender roles, and the role of women in China. Sociologist Li Yinhe, who studies gender roles in China, called the movie "a profound work based on solid social reality" and noted the conflict between individualism and traditional family values. Zhang Zifeng's performance was especially cited as the highlight of the film by critics, with some calling it a "breakthrough" and a "tour de force". James Marsh of the South China Morning Post praised the film's acting and its "progressive stance" tackling social issues like gender inequality.

== Awards and nominations ==
Year	Awards ceremony	Category	Nominee	Result	Ref
2021	Huading Award	Best Supporting Actress	Zhu Yuanyuan	Won	
2021	Huading Award	Best Actress	Zhang Zifeng	Nominated	
2021	Huading Award	Best New Director	Yin Ruoxi	Nominated	
2021	Huading Award	Best Song	Roy Wang	Nominated	
2021	Huading Award	Best Supporting Actor	Xiao Yang	Nominated	
2021	Huading Award	Best Writing	You Xiaoying	Nominated	
2021	Huading Award	Best New Performer	Jin Yaoyuan	Nominated	
2021	15th Asian Film Awards	Best Actress	Zhang Zifeng	Nominated	
2021	15th Asian Film Awards	Best New Director	Yin Ruoxi	Nominated	
2021	15th Asian Film Awards	Best Screenplay	You Xiaoying	Nominated	
2021	34th Golden Rooster Awards	Best Picture	Sister	Nominated	
2021	34th Golden Rooster Awards	Best Actress	Zhang Zifeng	Nominated	
2021	34th Golden Rooster Awards	Best Supporting Actor	Xiao Yang	Nominated	
2021	34th Golden Rooster Awards	Best Supporting Actress	Zhu Yuanyuan	Won	
2021	34th Golden Rooster Awards	Best Music	Gao Xiaoyang	Nominated	
2021	34th Golden Rooster Awards	Best Sound Recording	Zhou Lei and Wu Lei	Nominated	
