= Zhao Xiaoding =

Chinese photographer and cinematographer (born 1968)

- Born: 30 September 1968 (age 57); Beijing, China
- Occupations: Cinematographer, photographer

Chinese name
- Traditional Chinese: 趙小丁
- Simplified Chinese: 赵小丁
Transcriptions
Standard Mandarin
- Hanyu Pinyin: Zhào Xiǎodīng

Zhao Xiaoding (Mandarin pronunciation: [ʈʂâu̯ ɕi̯àu̯tíŋ]) is a Chinese photographer and cinematographer, famous for his many collaborations with Zhang Yimou.

He was nominated for the Academy Award for Best Cinematography for House of Flying Daggers (2004).

== Filmography ==
Year	Title	Director	Notes
1992	Divorce Wars	Chen Guoxing	
1993	Temporary Dad	Chen Guoxing	
1993	Sub-Husband	Chen Guoxing	
1994	Fools in Love	Chen Guoxing	
2002	Spring Subway	Zhang Yibai	With Gao Fei
2004	House of Flying Daggers	Zhang Yimou	
2005	Riding Alone for Thousands of Miles	Zhang Yimou	
2006	Curse of the Golden Flower	Zhang Yimou	
2008	Kung Fu Dunk	Kevin Chu	
2008	The Children of Huangshi	Roger Spottiswoode	
2008	An Empress and the Warriors	Ching Siu-tung	
2009	A Simple Noodle Story	Zhang Yimou	
2011	The Flowers of War	Zhang Yimou	
2014	Coming Home	Zhang Yimou	
2016	The Great Wall	Zhang Yimou	With Stuart Dryburgh
2017	Once Upon a Time	Himself; Anthony LaMolinara	
2018	Shadow	Zhang Yimou	
2019	Only Cloud Knows	Feng Xiaogang	
2020	One Second	Zhang Yimou	
2021	Cliff Walkers	Zhang Yimou	
2022	Snipers	Zhang Yimou; Zhang Mo	
2023	Full River Red	Zhang Yimou	
2023	Under the Light	Zhang Yimou	Reshoots only
2024	Article 20	Zhang Yimou	
2026	Scare Out	Zhang Yimou	

== Awards and nominations ==
Year	Award	Category	Title	Result
2004	Academy Awards	Best Cinematography	House of Flying Daggers	Nominated
2004	BAFTA Awards	Best Cinematography	House of Flying Daggers	Nominated
2004	Boston Society of Film Critics	Best Cinematography	House of Flying Daggers	Won
2004	National Society of Film Critics Awards	Best Cinematography	House of Flying Daggers	Won
2004	Satellite Awards	Best Cinematography	House of Flying Daggers	Won
