= Liu Haocun =

Chinese actress

- 刘浩存
- Born: Tonghua, Jilin, China
- Education: Beijing Dance Academy
- Occupation: Actress
- Years active: 2018–present

Liu Haocun (Chinese: 刘浩存; pinyin: Liú Hàocún) is a Chinese actress. She made her acting debut in Zhang Yimou's drama film One Second in 2016, and has since gone on to appear in various films such as A Little Red Flower (2020) and Cliff Walkers (2021).

== Early life ==
Liu studied at a high school attached to the Beijing Dance Academy. In May 2016, she was admitted to the Beijing Dance Academy for college, where she received first place in the art test at the Folk Dance Department.

== Career ==
During her sophomore year, she officially signed a contract with Zhang Yimou Studio. In May 2016, she graduated high school and passed three rounds of auditions and was cast as a heroine in Zhang's 2020 movie One Second, and then entered the preparatory group to start acting training. At first, Zhang had the idea of casting her in his 2018 movie Shadow, but due to the adjustment of the script, she was not cast. In December 2020, she played the role of an optimistic girl suffering from cancer in the movie A Little Red Flower (2020). She won accolades for her performance in One Second and A Little Red Flower.

On 25 January 2021, she won the 2020 Baidu Entertainment Best New Film Award. In February 2021, she participated in the Spring Festival Gala, where she sang songs 'Send the Night' and 'You are a Little Red Flower'. On the same month, she won the 2020 China Screen Billboard Annual Newcomer Actor Award sponsored by the film magazine China Screen.

In July 2021, Liu Haocun became the brand ambassador of Louis Vuitton. In October 2021, she won the Asian Film Award for Best Newcomer and the Best Young Actress Award in the New Generation Unit (Film Category) at the 8th WenRong TV Awards for her role of in the movie One Second. On the same year, she starred in Zhang Yimou's historical spy thriller film Cliff Walkers, which set in the Imperial Japanese puppet state of Manchukuo in the 1930s before the eruption of World War II.

On 2021, Liu was cast alongside Jackie Chan in the movie Ride On. In February 2022, she starred in the romantic-action movie Only Fools Rush In alongside Liu Haoran, which was directed by Han Han.

== Personal life ==
In addition to Louis Vuitton, Liu has won endorsements from brands such as L'Oreal, ZTE, Oreo and Cartier.

== Filmography ==
=== Film ===
Year	Title	Role	Ref.
2018	One Second	Orphan Liu	
2018	A Little Red Flower	Ma Xiaoyuan	
2021	Cliff Walkers	Xiao Lan	
2022	Only Fools Rush In	Zhou Huansong	
2023	Ride On	Xiao Bao	
2023	Just For Meeting You	Xu Niannian	
2024	Remember Me	Xu Jiayi / Li Siran	
2025	Girls on Wire	Tian Tian	
2026	Vanishing Point	Lin Yutong	

=== Television series ===
Year	Title	Role
2023	Derailment	Jiang Xiaoyuan
2024	Battle of Shangganling	Du Wenjin
2025	Be Passionately in Love	Xu Zhi
2025	The Seven Relics of Ill Omen	Mu Dai

== Awards and nominations ==
Year	Award	Category	Nominee / Work	Result	Ref.
2021	30th Huading Awards	Best New Performer	A Little Red Flower	Won	
2021	28th Beijing College Student Film Festival	Best Newcomer	A Little Red Flower	Won	
2021	15th Asian Film Awards	Best Newcomer	One Second	Won	
2021	8th Wenrong Awards	Best New Actress	One Second	Won	
2021	34th Golden Rooster Awards	Best Actress	A Little Red Flower	Nominated	
2023	15th Macau International Movie Festival	Best Newcomer	Ride On	Nominated	
