= My People, My Homeland =

- Film poster
- Traditional Chinese: 我和我的家鄉
- Simplified Chinese: 我和我的家乡
- Literal meaning: me and my homeland
- Hanyu Pinyin: wǒ hé wǒ de jiāxiāng
- Directed by: Ning Hao; Chen Sicheng; Deng Chao; Ning Hao; Da-Mo Peng; Ao Shen; Xu Zheng; Fei Yan; Baimei Yu
- Written by: Ziye Wang; Wang Ang; Chen Sicheng; Huan Shu; Peng Li; Wusi Liu; Quan Lixuan; Yi Yu; Peng Xu; Sun Shaokang; Rongshuo Xu; Bululufu; Keke He; Hua Weilin; Zheng Xu; Baimei Yu; Qi Yin; Yan Zhang; Xia Jiang; Yan Zhang; Mengxi Qin; Mengyuan Li; Da-Mo Peng; Fei Yan; Xing Wenxiong; Sun Xiaoxian
- Produced by: Ruifang Liu; Chi Ma; Zheng Ma; Qian Rui; Leng Yi; Heng Zhang; Meng Zhang
- Cinematography: Yu Cao; Michael Liu; Ming Sun; Boxue Wang; Max Da-Yung Wang
- Edited by: Aiyu Qiao; Ballu Saluja; Hongjia Tang; Yiran Tu; Xiaolin Zhou
- Music by: Li Heng; Xiao'ou Hu; Zhao Lin; Fei Peng
- Production company: Alibaba Pictures Group
- Distributed by: China Film Group Corporation
- Release date: 9 October 2020 (China)
- Running time: 153 minutes
- Country: China
- Language: Mandarin
- Box office: $433.2 million

My People, My Homeland (Chinese: 我和我的家乡) is a 2020 Chinese anthology comedy film. The film consists of five short stories that take place in Beijing, Guizhou, Shaanxi, Hangzhou, and Shenyang. The film was a financial success, grossing over $433.2 million worldwide. The film is a sequel to My People, My Country (2019), and it is followed by another sequel, My Country, My Parents (2021).

== Story ==
=== Beijing Good People ===
An interesting story about Zhang Beijing helping his cousin's treatment in Beijing.

=== UFO fell from the sky ===
The UFO appeared in Afu Village in Qiannan, Guizhou. Reporter Tang, scientists Dong Xuexue and Xiao Qin of the "Re-entry Science" project team went deep into the village to investigate. Village chief Wang Shouzheng and businessman Wang Chuqi warmly welcomed the three, but during the investigation, there were others who had other ideas.

=== Last Lesson ===
Lao Fan has Alzheimer's disease. His children sought help from Wangxi Village and wanted to repeat the last lesson of 1992 to help Teacher Fan recover his memory. The students of Teacher Fan did their best to recover the "children" and the downpour.

=== The Way Home ===
"Sand Apple" distributor Qiao Shulin and e-commerce anchor Yan Feiyan went back to their hometown when they returned to their alma mater to participate in the celebration. The story of Qiao Shulin who loves bragging and Yan Feiyan who dislikes him.

=== Ma Liang ===
Ma Liang was born in a mountain village in the northeast. He gave up his studies at a key Russian art school and returned to his hometown to help his hometown develop. In order not to let his wife Qiuxia find out, he and the villagers are pretending to live in Russia. By chance, Qiuxia went to Ma Liang's hometown.

Title	Director	Writers	Music	Cinematography	Editing
A Mystery of UFO	Chen Sicheng	Sicheng Chen; Huan Shu; Peng Li; Wusi Liu; Quan Lixuan; Yi Yu; Peng Xu; Sun Shaokang; Rongshuo Xu	Xiao'ou Hu	Michael Liu	Hongjia Tang
The Way Back to Hometown	Chao Deng; Baimei Yu	Baimei Yu; Qi Yin; Yan Zhang; Xia Jiang; Yan Zhang; Mengxi Qin; Mengyuan Li	Zhao Lin	Max Da-Yung Wang	Yiran Tu
A Beijing Good Person	Ning Hao	Ziye Wang; Wang Ang	Li Heng	Boxue Wang	Aiyu Qiao
The Magical Touches	Da-Mo Peng; Fei Yan	Da-Mo Peng; Fei Yan; Xing Wenxiong; Sun Xiaoxian	Fei Peng	Ming Sun	Xiaolin Zhou
The Last Class	Xu Zheng	Bululufu; Keke He; Hua Weilin; Zheng Xu	Fei Peng	Yu Cao	Xiaolin Zhou

== Release ==
The film became the twelfth highest-grossing film in China with box office earnings at RMB 2.83 billion.

== Accolades ==
Date	Award	Category	Recipient(s) and nominee(s)	Result	Notes
2021	34th Golden Rooster Awards	Special Jury Prize	My People, My Homeland	Won	
