= Chinese Doctors =

- Theatrical release poster

Chinese name
- Traditional Chinese: 中國醫生
- Simplified Chinese: 中国医生
Transcriptions
Standard Mandarin
- Hanyu Pinyin: Zhōngguó Yīshēng
- Directed by: Andrew Lau
- Written by: Yu Yonggan
- Produced by: Peggy Lee; Andrew Lau
- Starring: Zhang Hanyu; Yuan Quan; Zhu Yawen; Li Chen; Jackson Yee; Oho Ou
- Cinematography: Andrew Lau; Edmond Fung
- Edited by: Sun Chi-man; Li Jianxiang; Xiao Jiancheng
- Music by: Chan Kwong-wing; Kay Chan
- Production companies: Bona Film Group; Zhujiang Film Group; Hubei Changjiang Film Group; China Film Group; Huaxia Film Distribution; Alibaba Pictures
- Distributed by: Huaxia Film Distribution
- Release date: 9 July 2021
- Running time: 129 minutes
- Country: China
- Language: Mandarin
- Box office: US$206.1 million

Chinese Doctors (Chinese: 中国医生) is a 2021 Chinese disaster film co-produced, co-cinematographed and directed by Andrew Lau and starring Zhang Hanyu, Yuan Quan, Zhu Yawen, Li Chen, with Jackson Yee and Oho Ou. The film follows the story of frontline medical workers who fought against the COVID-19 pandemic in Wuhan Jinyintan Hospital, Hubei, China. The film premiered in China on 9 July 2021, to commemorate the 100th anniversary of the Chinese Communist Party. The film received mixed to positive reviews and won Best Music at the 34th Golden Rooster Awards.

== Plot ==
Chinese Doctors follows doctors and nurses at Jinyintan Hospital in Wuhan, alongside medical personnel from across China who are dispatched to assist the city and Hubei Province during the COVID-19 outbreak.

On the eve of the Spring Festival in 2020, people all over the country are immersed in the joy of the New Year, and the people of Wuhan are no exception, but the inexplicable pneumonia began to spread. Initially, only a small number of patients are admitted, but cases rapidly increase, and Jinyintan Hospital becomes overwhelmed. Doctors gradually realize that they are confronting a highly contagious and dangerous new disease about which little is known. Both patients and medical staff experience fear and helplessness as treatments are uncertain and deaths mount, forcing doctors to confront professional doubt, emotional strain, and disagreements over treatment approaches.

As the crisis escalates, large-scale national mobilization begins, with the feeling of "giving up a small family and caring for everyone". Emergency hospitals such as Huoshenshan and Leishenshan are constructed at unprecedented speed, and medical teams from across the country travel to Wuhan to provide assistance. The film portrays this collective response as a turning point, shifting the narrative from despair to resolve as coordinated efforts strengthen the medical system and sustain frontline workers.

One of the film's central character arcs follows Yang Xiaoyang, a fledgling resident physician. Initially inexperienced and uncertain, he struggles under pressure, including a moment of hesitation during a critical intubation procedure that draws sharp criticism from senior doctor Tao Jun, who temporarily bars him from the intensive care unit. Determined to improve, Yang trains repeatedly on his own and eventually proves himself, completing his professional growth through perseverance during the crisis. His development mirrors the experiences of many young medical workers during the outbreak.

The film also presents the perspective of ordinary citizens through Jin Zai, a delivery driver, and his wife Xiaowen. Their story reflects the fear, misunderstanding, and gradual trust experienced by many patients in the early stages of the epidemic. Xiaowen's emergency cesarean section highlights the risks doctors take to save lives, while Jin Zai continues delivering food despite the dangers, demonstrating mutual aid among civilians. After the outbreak subsides, the couple—now parents—encounter Wen Ting again, symbolizing recovery, continuity, and the persistence of everyday life after crisis.

In the final scenes, Jin Zai and Xiaowen return with their child to reunite with Wen Ting, underscoring the film's closing theme of renewal. The story concludes by emphasizing hope and resilience, suggesting that while the epidemic leaves lasting memories, life continues forward.

== Cast ==
- Zhang Hanyu as Zhang Jingyu, Hospital Director
- Yuan Quan as Wen Ting, Director of Emergency
- Zhu Yawen as Tao Jun
- Li Chen as Wu Chenguang
- Jackson Yee as Yang Xiaoyang, Resident doctor
- Oho Ou as Jin Zai
- Zhou Ye as Xiao Wen
- Feng Wenjuan as Xin Wei, Director of Anesthesiology
- Song Jia as Huang Jiahui
- Liang Dawei as Zhao Jinsheng
- Xiao Ai as Wan Dongfang
- Li Qin as Xiang Nanfang, Nurse
- Zhang Tian'ai as Zhou Nan, Nurse
- Ya Mei as Ma Xiaoning
- Yang Qiru as Zhang Lu
- Yu Ailei as Hubei Support Team Member
- Geng Le as Jiang Yayuan, Wuhan Health Director
- Mei Ting as Xu Hui
- Ye He as Huang Chaoyang
- Jiang Linyan as Tang Xiaoshan
- Faye Yu as Lin Zhonglu
- Ni Hongjie as Zhou Ruoju, Zhang Jingyu's wife
- Feng Shaofeng as Shang Zheng
- Zhou Bichang as Du Jian
- Zhang Songwen as Huang Xiaoyang
- Zhang Zifeng as Zhang Xiaofeng
- Tong Liya as Wu Chenguang's wife
- Gu Jiacheng as Body donor's grandson
- Yin Xiaotian as Hubei Support Team Member
- Huang Lu as Sick woman
- Jenny Zhang as Laboratory staff
- Liu Lin as Xiaoyang's mother
- Ashton Chen
- Wang Zhifei
- Qin Hailu
- Lü Chengxi

== Movie song ==
Different	Song title	Compose	Write lyrics	Arranger	Singer
Theme song	"Anti-epidemic March"	Qi Fang	Yang Qifang	Ding Ji	Zhuang Yinan, Air Force Blue Sky Children's Art Troupe
Theme song	"We're Not Afraid"	Gao Jin	Gao jJin		Mao Amin、Zheng Yunlong
Episode	"I Will Replace You"	Chen Guangrong	Liu Zhuohui		Mao Buyi

== Movie box office ==
time	Box office (100 million yuan)
July 12, 2021	3.5
July 14, 2021	5.64
July 18, 2021	8
July 28, 2021	12.03
July 31, 2021	12.38
August 15, 2021	13
September 1, 2021	13.22

== Production ==
After the shooting of The Captain, Andrew Lau accepted the task of shooting Chinese Doctors. Most cast members of The Captain joined the cast. Experts from the Propaganda Department of the Chinese Communist Party, National Health Commission, Chinese Center for Disease Control and Prevention, Hubei Provincial Health Commission, and Hubei Provincial Center for Disease Control and Prevention participated in script revision. The film began production in April 2020 and finished filming in Guangzhou on 23 December of that same year. Filming also took place in Wuxi, Wuhan, and Shanghai.

== Behind the scenes ==
At the beginning of April 2020, the first time Wuhan was "unblocked", the creative team of Bona Films conducted an interview with the Guangdong medical team in Hubei, and together with Academician Zhong Nanshan himself, the first person from Guangzhou to assist Wuhan, and the Guangdong aid The Hubei medical team, as well as hundreds of medical workers at the forefront of the anti-epidemic front, such as Wuhan Jinyintan Hospital, Tongji Medical College Affiliated to Huazhong University of Science and Technology, Zhongnan Hospital of Wuhan University, Wuhan Central Hospital, etc. first-hand information. The actors also went to the hospital to experience and learn to accompany them.

Shooting scene: "Chinese Doctor" builds a "medical-grade studio" in a 1:1 ratio. The filming uses hospital equipment in strict accordance with the construction standards of real hospitals, and is even renovated by a professional hospital. The staff will not start shooting until they pass the inspection. Actors have undergone medical training before filming, learning how to wear protective clothing and isolation gowns, as well as rescue techniques such as cardiac resuscitation, vascular puncture, tracheal intubation, and even extracorporeal membrane lung ECMO (commonly known as "artificial lung"). Many people in the show are also real medical workers. All medical equipment can be used in real life, and oxygen, water, and electricity are all connected.

- During the filming of the film in Wuxi Movie Metropolis, 7 studios were used to set up the scene. Except for the studio used for the recording of "China New Rap", the rest were rented for the film.
- The filming scene of the film in Wuhan temporarily caused misunderstanding among netizens, for which the crew issued a statement to refute the rumor.
- Zhang Hanyu took the initiative to go to Jinyintan Hospital to live with President Zhang Dingyu for three days before starting the machine. He followed President Zhang to meetings and ward rounds. He not only saw the working status of President Zhang, but also observed many important details that helped shape his role. Ready to shoot。In addition to learning to speak Hubei dialect, Zhang Hanyu also carefully grasps Zhang Dingyu's walking posture and presents it in a controlled manner.
- In order to play the role of the director of the critical care medicine department, Yuan Quan has bruises all over her face and white hands every day. In one scene, she wore protective clothing for 8 hours in a row. Not only did she continue to practice wearing protective clothing and learn medical knowledge, she also asked medical workers who had experienced the frontline of the epidemic for personal experience.
- During the filming of "Chinese Doctor", the film crew and screenwriter interviewed the team. On the evening of April 7, 2020, the machine was set up at the entrance and exit of the expressway, waiting to shoot the moment when the Lihan Passage was "unblocked". In the early morning of April 8, the scene of people eating hot and dry noodles in the streets and alleys of Wuhan was shot again. This is our filmmakers, a tribute to this city.

== Release ==
Chinese Doctors was released on 9 July 2021 in China.

== Box office ==
The film earned a total of 421 million yuan ($65.13 million) in its first four days of release.

== Awards and nominations ==
years	Awards ceremony	Awards	Name	result
September 2021	Beijing International Film Festival 28th College Student Film Festival	“光影青春” Excellent Domestic Film	Chinese Doctor	Shortlisted
October 2021	The 34th Tokyo International Film Festival China Film Week Golden Rooster Award	Best Female Lead	Yuan Quan	Won
November 2021	The 17th China-US Film Festival Golden Angel Award	Shortlisted Best Film Award	Chinese Doctor Liu Weiqiang	Won
November 2021	34th Golden Rooster Awards	Best Feature Film	Chinese Doctor	Won
November 2021	34th Golden Rooster Awards	Best Supporting Actor	Zhu Yawen	Nominated
December 2021	34th Golden Rooster Awards	Best Music	Kay Chan, Chan Kwong-wing	Nominated
December 2021	The 13th Macau International Film Festival	Best Video	Chinese Doctor	Won
December 2021	The 13th Macau International Film Festival	Best Supporting Actress	Yuan Quan	Nominated
December 2021	The 16th China Changchun Film Festival	Golden Deer Award Jury Prize	Chinese Doctor	Nominated
January 2022	New Era International Film Festival Jinyanghua Award	Hundreds of High-Quality Movies in a Century	Chinese Doctor	Won
April 2022	The 33rd Huading Awards China Film Satisfaction Survey Top 50 List	The 33rd Huading Awards China Film Satisfaction Survey Top 50 List	Chinese Doctor	First place
June 2022	The 12th Guangdong Provincial Spiritual Civilization Construction "Five Ones Project" selection work	Excellent Works of the 12th Guangdong Provincial Spiritual Civilization Construction "Five Ones Project"	Chinese Doctor	Selected
June 2022	The 33rd Huading Awards	Best Chinese Film	Chinese Doctor	Nominated
June 2022	The 33rd Huading Awards	Best Director of a Chinese Film	Liu Weiqiang	Nominated
June 2022	The 33rd Huading Awards	Best Actor in a Chinese Movie	Zhang Hanyu	Nominated
July 2022	The 36th Popular Film Hundred Flowers Awards	Best Director	Liu Weiqiang	Nominated
July 2022	The 36th Popular Film Hundred Flowers Awards	Best Screenplay	Yu Yonggan	Nominated
July 2022	The 36th Popular Film Hundred Flowers Awards	Best Actress	Yuan Quan	Won
July 2022	The 36th Popular Film Hundred Flowers Awards	Best Supporting Actress	Zhou Ye	Nominated
July 2022	The 36th Popular Film Hundred Flowers Awards	Best Supporting Actor	Yi Yangqianxi	Nominated
July 2022	The 36th Popular Film Hundred Flowers Awards	Film Awards	Chinese Doctor	Nominated
September 2022	2022 Movie Channel Media Honor Night	Most Popular Actress	Yuan Quan	Won

== Film review ==
The winner of the "Medal of the Republic", Zhong Nanshan, an academician of the Chinese Academy of Engineering and a famous expert in pulmonology, wept many times during the viewing. He said: "The strongest feeling is that the film 'Chinese Doctor' does not have any cover up, it really restores the situation in Wuhan in the early days, the difficulties we encountered, the tension of the beds and the emotions of the patients, I feel very real."

Chinese Doctor uses small emotions to set off big feelings. The movie focuses on showing the great love of medical staff who risk their lives to save lives and heal the wounded in the face of the epidemic, and does not shy away from their various emotions as ordinary people, even negative emotions: full of hope but finally disappointed, and their powerlessness to save their lives despite their best efforts. Feelings, anxiety caused by the uncertainty of the treatment effect, grievances and guilt for not being able to take up family responsibilities, etc. In the extreme physical exhaustion and the great mental pressure, their perseverance and hard work mixed with pain are more real and valuable, and they have more touching power.(Review of Guangming Daily)

The group portraits of medical staff represented by Zhang Jingyu, Wen Ting and Tao Jun in the film highlight the collectivism and dedication in the mainstream Chinese values. The ethos is also well expressed in the film. Chinese Doctor depicts a group of characters with distinct personalities. Among them, the prototype of Zhang Jingyu played by Zhang Hanyu is Zhang Dingyu, president of Jinyintan Hospital, and other doctors including Wen Ting and Tao Jun, although there is no clear character prototype, but their deeds are all familiar. In contrast, Yang Xiaoyang, a young doctor played by Yi Yangqianxi, is a fictional character. From him, the audience can see the image of a young man who is studious, optimistic and helpful.(Review of "Beijing Daily")
