= Zhang Yi (actor) =

Chinese actor (born 1978)

- 张译
- Zhang in 2026
- Born: February 17, 1978 (age 48); Harbin, Heilongjiang, China
- Education: Comrades Drama Troupe of the Political Department of Beijing Military Region
- Occupation: Actor
- Years active: 2005–present
- Spouse: Qian Linlin (m. 2006)

Chinese name
- Simplified Chinese: 张译
- Traditional Chinese: 張譯
Transcriptions
Standard Mandarin
- Hanyu Pinyin: Zhāng Yì

Zhang Yi (simplified Chinese: 张译; traditional Chinese: 張譯; pinyin: Zhāng Yì; born 17 February 1978) is a Chinese actor. He is best known for his roles in films Dearest (2014), Operation Red Sea (2018), One Second (2020), and Cliff Walkers (2021), as well as the television series Soldiers Sortie (2006), My Chief and My Regiment (2009), and The Knockout (2023).

== Biography ==
Zhang was born into a teacher's family in Harbin, Heilongjiang, on February 17, 1978.

Zhang has always wanted to become a television announcer, yet was unsuccessful in his attempts to attend the Beijing Broadcasting Institute for various reasons. In 1996, he was admitted to the Harbin Drama Theater at his own expense. In 1997, he applied for People's Liberation Army National Defence University, The Central Academy of Drama, and Shanghai Theatre Academy, but was not admitted. In the same year, he was admitted to the comrades-in-arms drama troupe of the Political Department of the Beijing Military Region.

== Career ==
Zhang made his drama debut and received widespread recognition as Comrade Shi Jin in the critically and commercially successful 2006 drama Soldiers Sortie, and continued to collaborate with writer Lan Xiaolong in upcoming military war dramas My Chief and My Regiment and The Line, which were both critical hits, scoring 8.9 and 9.2 on Douban respectively.

Zhang was widely praised for his acting as a father desperate to find his abducted son in 2014 feature film Dearest, and received his first major acting award at the 30th Golden Rooster Awards. In 2016, he played a secret police who was willing to fight for a better world in wuxia film Brotherhood of Blades II, and also starred in Cao Baoping's black comedy Cock and Bull, which garnered him another Best Supporting Actor nomination at the 31st Golden Rooster Awards.

In 2016, Zhang played the protagonist in entrepreneurial drama Feather Flies to the Sky, and received Best Actor awards at the 23rd Magnolia Awards and 29th Golden Eagle Awards. He then starred in action war film Operation Red Sea, which became the second-highest-grossing-film ever in China.

== Family ==
Zhang married Qian Linlin (钱琳琳), a hostess at the Central People's Broadcasting Station.

== Filmography ==
=== Film ===
Year	English title	Chinese title	Role	Notes/Ref.
2010	The Founding of a Party	建党伟业	Zhou Fohai	
2011	An Inaccurate Memoir	匹夫	Gao Dongliang	
2012	Caught in the Web	搜索	Zhang Mu	
2013	Better and Better	越来越好之村晚	Geng Shanxi	Cameo
2014	The Golden Era	黄金时代	Jiang Xijin	
2014	Dearest	亲爱的	Han Dezhong	
2015	Crazy New Year’s Eve	一路惊喜	Hou Xiaogang	
2015	Mr. Six	老炮儿	Captain Zhang	Cameo
2015	Mountains May Depart	山河故人	Zhang Jinsheng	
2015	The Promised Land	回到被爱的每一天	Jiang He	
2016	Run for Love	奔爱	Zhou Hongyi	
2016	The New Year's Eve of Old Lee	过年好	Li Ermao	Cameo
2016	Everybody's Fine	一切都好	Guan Qing's husband	
2016	Cock and Bull	追凶者也	Dong Xiaofeng	
2016	I Am Not Madame Bovary	我不是潘金莲	Jia Congming	
2016	Blood of Youth	少年	Zhang Jianyu	
2017	Brotherhood of Blades II	绣春刀II修罗战场	Lu Wenzhao	
2017	Goldbuster	妖铃铃	Wang Baojian	
2018	Operation Red Sea	红海行动	Yang Rui	
2018	Ash Is Purest White	江湖儿女	customer	Cameo
2019	The Climbers	攀登者	Qu Songlin	
2019	My People, My Country	我和我的祖国	Gao Yuan	
2020	The Eight Hundred	八佰	Lao Suanpan	
2020	My People, My Homeland	我和我的家乡	Jiang Qianfang	
2020	The Sacrifice	金刚川	Zhang Fei	
2020	One Second	一秒钟	Zhang Jiusheng	
2021	Cliff Walkers	悬崖之上	Zhang Xianchen	
2022	Snipers	狙击手	Company Commander	Cameo
2022	Home Coming	万里归途	Zong Dawei	
2023	Full River Red	满江红	He Li	
2023	Seven Killings	刀尖	Jin Shenshui	
2023	Endless Journey	三大队	Cheng Bing	
2024	Article 20	第二十条	Director Zhang	
2024	Black Dog	狗阵	Group leader	
2026	Blades of the Guardians	镖人：风起大漠	Pei Shiju	
2026	Scare Out	惊蛰无声	Director Wang	
2026	Traces of Justice	神探之痕迹	Cui Xun	

=== Television series ===
Year	English title	Chinese title	Role	Notes	Ref.
2005	Qing Chun Zheng Bu Zou	青春正步走	Liu Fugang		
2005	Worker	民工	Guo Zhendong		
2006	Qiao's Grand Courtyard	乔家大院	Changshun		
2006	Soldiers Sortie	士兵突击	Shi Jin		
2007	Golden Triangle Dead End Heaven	末路天堂 / 幻想之旅	Police officer	guest	
2009	My Chief and My Regiment	我的团长我的团	Meng Fanliao		
2009	The Line	生死线	He Moxiu		
2009	Three and Seven Make Twenty One	三七撞上二十一	Qiao Rui		
2010	Shooting From Behind	枪声背后	Gao Qingshan		
2010	Bing Tuan Sui Yue	兵团岁月	Qiao Haiyang		
2011	Gang Tie Nian Dai	钢铁年代	Bian Lipeng	filmed in 2009	
2011	Snowflake Flying	雪花那个飘	Zhao Changtian		
2011	Zhang Men Nv Xu	掌门女婿	Zhang Yongsheng		
2011	A Live in Son-in-law	新上门女婿	Tian Chong		
2012	Beijing Love Story	北京爱情故事	Shi Xiaomeng		
2012	Legend of Entrepreneurship	温州一家人	Zhou Maigou		
2013	Mop Lady's Spring	抹布女也有春天	Wu Tong		
2013	Love Is Not Blind	失恋33天	Mr. Ge	Remake of the film of the same name	
2013	Hot Mom!	辣妈正传	Yuan Bao		
2014	Mr. Good Man	好男儿之情感护理	Hao Nan'er		
2015	Marry a Husband	嫁个老公过日子	Zhen Hao		
2016	Women Must Be Stronger	女不强大天不容	Gao Fei		
2016	The Good Fellas	好家伙	Lu Yan	filmed in 2012	
2017	Feather Flies to the Sky	鸡毛飞上天	Chen Jianghe		
2017	Guardian of Beauty	守护丽人	Chen Xi		
2019	My Biological Father and Step-father	我的亲爹和后爸	Li Liang	Youku	
2020	Reborn	重生	Qin Chi	Youku	
2023	The Knockout	狂飙	An Xin	iQiyi	
2023	Who Is He	他是谁	Wei Guoping	iQiyi	
2024	The Price of Silence	沉默的代价	TBA	iQiyi	
TBA	Li Bai	李白	Du Fu	filmed in 2009	
TBA	National Action	国家行动	Xu Wangdong	filmed in 2016	

== Awards and nominations ==
Year	Award	Category	Nominated work	Result	Ref.
2015	30th Golden Rooster Awards	Best Supporting Actor	Dearest	Won	
2016	33rd Hundred Flowers Awards	Best Supporting Actor	Dearest	Nominated	
2017	24th Beijing College Student Film Festival	Best Actor	Cock and Bull	Won	
2017	8th China Film Director's Guild Awards	Best Actor	Cock and Bull	Won	
2017	31st Golden Rooster Awards	Best Supporting Actor	Cock and Bull	Nominated	
2017	23rd Shanghai Television Festival	Best Actor	Feather Flies to the Sky	Won	
2018	31st Flying Apsaras Award	Outstanding Actor	Feather Flies to the Sky	Nominated	
2018	29th China TV Golden Eagle Award	Best Actor	Feather Flies to the Sky	Won	
2018	25th Beijing College Student Film Festival	Best Actor	Operation Red Sea	Nominated	
2018	34th Hundred Flowers Awards	Best Actor	Operation Red Sea	Nominated	
2019	6th The Actors of China Award Ceremony	Best Actor (Sapphire Category)	The Glorious Era	Nominated	
2019	2nd Cultural and Entertainment Industry Congress	Best Supporting Actor (Film)	The Climbers	Nominated	
2020	27th Huading Awards	Best Supporting Actor	The Climbers	Nominated	
2020	35th Hundred Flowers Awards	Best Actor	My People, My Country	Nominated	
2020	7th The Actors of China Award Ceremony	Best Actor (Sapphire)	—N/a	Nominated	
2020	12th Macau International Movie Festival	Best Actor	The Eight Hundred	Won	
2021	15th Asian Film Awards	Best Actor	Cliff Walkers	Nominated	
2021	34th Golden Rooster Awards	Best Actor	Cliff Walkers	Won	
2022	36th Hundred Flowers Awards	Best Actor	Cliff Walkers	Won	
2023	18th Huabiao Awards	Outstanding Actor	My People, My Country	Won	
