= Fireflies in the Sun =

- Film poster
- Traditional Chinese: 誤殺2
- Simplified Chinese: 误杀2
- Hanyu Pinyin: Wùshā Èr
- Directed by: Dai Mo
- Written by: Li Peng
- Based on: John Q. by Nick Cassavetes
- Produced by: Chen Sicheng; Liu Xiaoyang
- Starring: Xiao Yang; Janice Man; Simon Yam
- Cinematography: He Shan
- Edited by: Tang Hongjia
- Music by: Hu Xiao'ou
- Production companies: Wanda Pictures; China Film Co., Ltd. Beijing Enlight Media; Taopiaopiao
- Release date: 17 December 2021 (China)
- Running time: 118 minutes
- Country: China
- Language: Mandarin
- Box office: US$176.4 million

Fireflies in the Sun (Chinese: 误杀2) is a 2021 Chinese crime thriller film produced by Chen Sicheng, directed by Dai Mo, and starring Xiao Yang, Janice Man, and Simon Yam. Although the film reunites the same production team and the lead actor of Sheep Without a Shepherd, it is not a direct sequel to that film or its source Drishyam. It is a remake of the 2002 American thriller drama film John Q., which was directed by Nick Cassavetes and starring Denzel Washington. It follows the story of Lin Rilang, a father and husband whose son is diagnosed with an enlarged heart and gives all his efforts to collect money for his son's operation. The film premiered in China on 17 December 2021.

== Cast ==
- Xiao Yang as Lin Rilang, a screenwriter
- Janice Man as Ah Ling, Lin Rilang's wife
- Simon Yam as Zhang Zhengyi, police
- Wang Haoze as Xiaochong, son
- Chen Yusi as Li Anqi, journalist
- Song Yang as Dama, Xiaochong's attending doctor
- Aarif Rahman as Sading, mayor's secretary
- Tan Zhuo

== Production ==
The producers originally decided to film the production in Thailand, as was the case for Sheep Without a Shepherd. However, due to the impact of the COVID-19 pandemic, they built a street view of Thailand in Jiangmen, Guangdong, and the indoor play was completed in the studio of Xiangshan Global Studios.

== Release ==
Fireflies in the Sun was released in China on 17 December 2021.

=== Box office ===
Fireflies in the Sun earned a total of 300 million yuan in its first three days of release.
