= Zhu Yuanyuan =

Chinese actress (1974–2025)

- 朱媛媛
- Born: 18 March 1974; Shibei District, Qingdao, Shandong, China
- Died: 17 May 2025 (aged 51)
- Education: Qingdao Art School; Central Academy of Drama
- Occupation: Actress
- Years active: 1995–2025
- Agent: National Theatre Company of China
- Spouse: Xin Baiqing (m. 2004; died 2025)
- Children: 1

Zhu Yuanyuan (Chinese: 朱媛媛; pinyin: Zhū Yuányuán; 18 March 1974 – 17 May 2025) was a Chinese actress.

Zhu is noted for her roles as Tao Hua and Song Yu in the film and television series The Forest Ranger and The Forest Ranger respectively.

== Early life ==
Zhu was born and raised in Shibei District of Qingdao, Shandong, where she finished from Qingdao Art School in 1992, her ancestral home in Yixing, Wuxi, Jiangsu. Zhu graduated from Central Academy of Drama in 1997, where she majored in acting.

== Acting career ==
Zhu began her career by appearing in small roles in 1995, such as Spring Breeze in the Evening, Modern Urban Heroine, and Waiting Hall.

In 1998, Zhu won the Best TV Actress Award at the Beijing Chunyan Awards and Favorite Actress Award at the Golden Eagle Awards for her performance in Loquacious Zhang Damin's Happy Life.

Zhu's first film role was uncredited appearance in the film Bey, Our 1948 (1999).

In 2000, Zhu played the role of Soong Ching-ling in Sun Yat-Sen, for which she won the Favorite Actress Award at the CCTV Television Awards. That same year, she earned her Hundred Flowers Award for Best Actress nomination for her performance as Li Yun in Beautiful Family.

In 2001, Zhu had a supporting role in Records of Kangxi's Travel Incognito 2, a historical television series starring Zhang Guoli and Deng Jie.

For her role as Song Yu in Romantic Matter, Zhu was nominated for the Golden Eagle Award for Favorite Actress and Chinese Television Flying Apsaras Award for Outstanding Actress.

In 2005, Zhu starred in The Forest Ranger, a film adaptation based on the novel of Zhang Ping's The Attacker, she received nominations at the Shanghai Film Critics Awards, Golden Rooster Awards and Huabiao Film Awards, and won the Female Actor Award at the Golden Phoenix Awards.

In 2010, Zhu co-starred with Jet Li, Gwei Lun-mei and Wen Zhang in Ocean Heaven as the Aunt Chai. She was nominated for Best Supporting Actress Award at the Hundred Flowers Awards.

In 2012, Zhu played the lead role in Love in the Family, for which she earned her second Golden Eagle Awards for Favorite Actress.

== Personal life and death ==
Zhu married her university friend Xin Baiqing in 2004, their daughter was born in August 2008. Zhu died of cancer on 17 May 2025, at the age of 51.

== Filmography ==
=== Film ===
Year	English title	Chinese title	Role	Notes
1999	Bey, Our 1948	再见，我们的1948	Tang Gong	
2000	Beautiful Family	美丽的家	Li Yun	
2005	The Forest Ranger	天狗	Tao Hua	
2009	Tiny Dust, True Love	寻找微尘	The Vice-president	
2010	Ocean Heaven	海洋天堂	Aunt Chai	
2015	Lost in Hong Kong	港囧		
2020	A Little Red Flower	送你一朵小红花		
2021	Sister	我的姐姐		

=== Television ===
Year	English title	Chinese title	Role	Notes
1995		一地鸡毛	The nanny	
1996	Spring Breeze in the Evening	春风沉醉的晚上	Zheng Xiuyue	
1996	Modern Urban Heroine	都市英雄	Hua Niuzi	
1997	Waiting Hall	候车大厅	Hu Lili	
1997		百年沉浮	Pei Yelian	
1997		红杏出墙记	Liu Ruyan	
1998	Loquacious Zhang Damin's Happy Life	贫嘴张大民的幸福生活	Li Yunfang	
1999		九九归一	Cai Xiaowan	
1999	My Beloved Motherland	我亲爱的祖国	Zhang Zhiruo	
2000	Sun Yat-Sen	孙中山	Soong Ching-ling	
2000	Love Literature	京城大状师	Xiaorou	
2001	The Best Clown Under Heaven	天下第一丑	Chai Xiugu	
2001	Records of Kangxi's Travel Incognito 2	康熙微服私访记2	Lu Zhu'er	
2002	Last Hour of the Century's End	世纪末的晚钟	Shen Zhiping	
2002		爱情宝典之小棋士	Miao Guan	
2002		爱情宝典之绿牡丹	Che Jingying	
2003		天高地厚	Bao Zhen	
2003	Romantic Matter	浪漫的事	Song Yu	
2003		良心作证	Xiao Mei	
2004	Tracing	追踪	Shang Qiuyun	
2004	Family Has 9 Phoenixes	家有九凤	Qi Feng	
2004		酒巷深深	Liu Xuying	
2005	Secret Order 1949	密令1949	Lin Qianru	
2005		中国式结婚	guest	
2005		红色追击令	Mei Ruojin	
2005		萍水相逢过大年	Feng Qing	
2006	Eight Brothers	八兄弟	Fang Fang	
2006	Be a Man	好男当家	Yang Juan	
2007	Honorable Years	光荣岁月	Bai Xiangming	
2009	Happy Secret Code	幸福密码	Han Xifeng	
2009	Looks at This Family	瞧这一家子	Sun Xiaodan	
2010	13th Princess	十三格格新传	Empress Dowager Cixi	
2011	Love in the Family	咱家那些事	Xiu Yan	
2013		离婚后再战江湖		

=== Drama ===
Year	English title	Chinese title	Role	Notes
1998	Richard III	理查三世		
2010	Four Generations under One Roof	四世同堂	Yun Mei	
2013	Big Family	大宅门	Huang Chun/ Yang Jiuhong/ Xiang Xiu	

== Awards ==
Year	Work	Award	Result	Notes
2000	Loquacious Zhang Damin's Happy Life	Chunyan Awards for Best TV Actress	Won	
2000	Loquacious Zhang Damin's Happy Life	Golden Eagle Award for Favorite Actress	Won	
2001	Sun Yat-Sen	CCTV Television Award for Favorite Actress	Won	
2001	Beautiful Family	Hundred Flowers Award for Best Actress	Nominated	
2004	Romantic Matter	Golden Eagle Award for Favorite Actress	Nominated	
2004	Romantic Matter	Chinese Television Flying Apsaras Award for Outstanding Actress	Nominated	
2006	The Forest Ranger	Shanghai Film Critics Award for Best Actress	Won	
2006	Family Has 9 Phoenixes	Golden Eagle Award for Favorite Actress	Won	
2007	The Forest Ranger	Golden Rooster Award for Best Actress	Nominated	
2007	The Forest Ranger	Huabiao Film Award for Outstanding Actress	Nominated	
2007	The Forest Ranger	Golden Phoenix Award for Female Actor	Won	
2011		Sohu Internet TV Festival – Best Actress	Nominated	
2012	Ocean Heaven	Hundred Flowers Award for Best Supporting Actress	Nominated	
2012	Love in the Family	Golden Eagle Award for Favorite Actress	Nominated	
