= TFBoys discography =

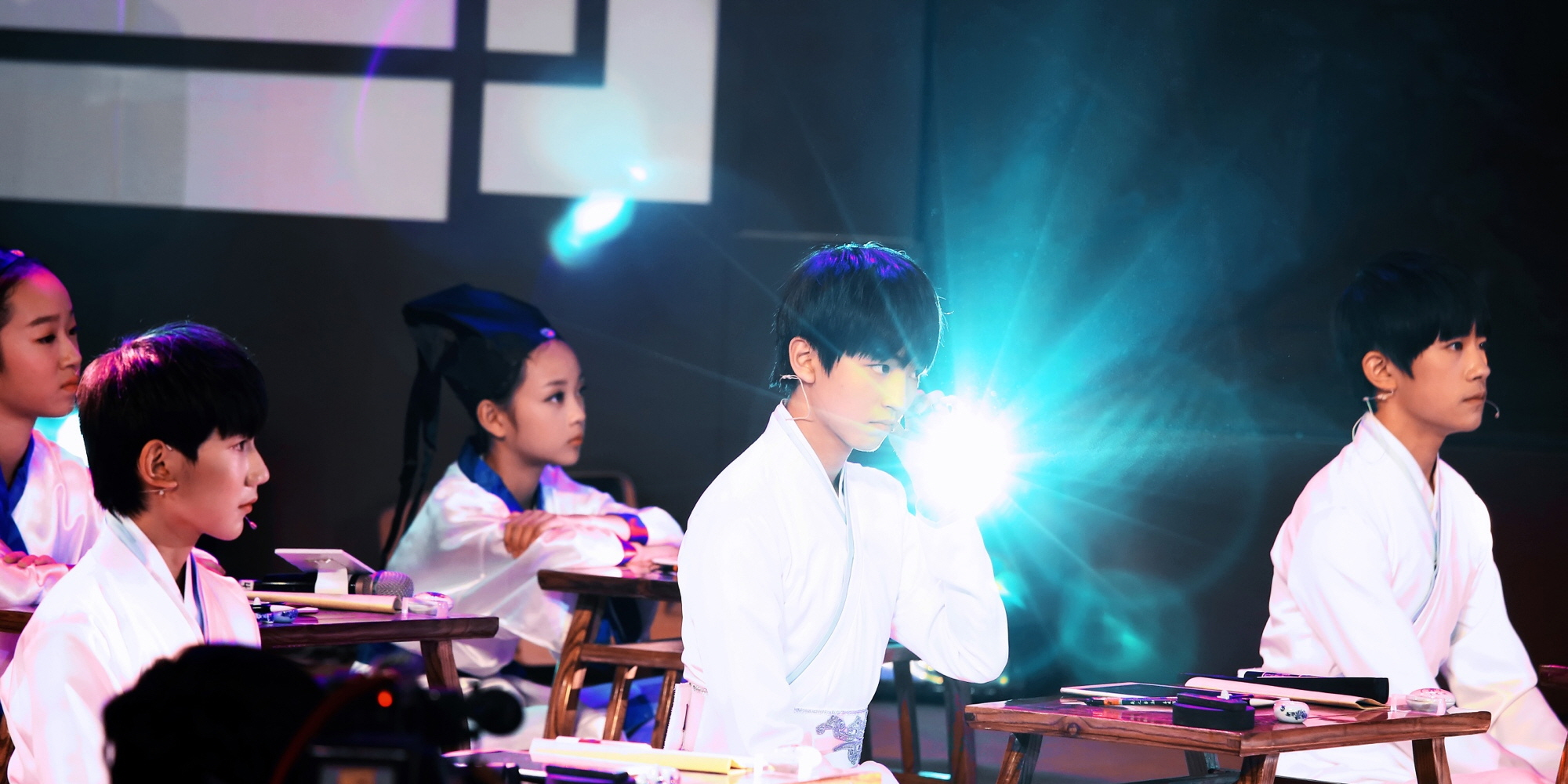
- TFBoys in 2015
- EPs: 1
- Single albums: 5

This is the discography of Chinese boy group TFBoys, with members Karry Wang, Roy Wang, and Jackson Yee making up the trio. They released their first extended play Big Dreamer in December 2015.

== Extended plays ==
List of extended plays
Title	Album details
Big Dreamer	Released: December 29, 2015; Label: Time Fengjun Entertainment; Formats: CD, Digital Download; Track listing: 1. Adore (宠爱); 2. Young (样); 3. Big Dreamer (大梦想家); 4. The Rest of Our Summer (剩下的盛夏); 5. Love with You; 6. Youth Say (少年说)

== Single albums ==
List of single albums
Title	Album details
Heart – Start to Love	Released: October 18, 2013; Label: Time Fengjun Entertainment; Formats: CD, Digital Download; Track listing: 1. Heart; 2. Love Start (爱出发); 3. Start on Dream (梦想起航)
Magic Castle	Released: April 28, 2014; Label: Time Fengjun Entertainment; Formats: CD, Digital Download; Track listing: 1. Magic Castle (魔法城堡); 2. Magic Castle (Instrumental)
For Dreams, Always Be Ready	Released: August 6, 2014; Label: Time Fengjun Entertainment; Formats: CD, Digital Download; Track listing: 1. For Dreams, Always Be Ready; 2. For Dreams, Always Be Ready (Instrumental)
Manual of Youth	Released: October 17, 2014; Label: Time Fengjun Entertainment; Formats: CD, Digital Download; Track listing: 1. Manual of Youth (青春修炼手册); 2. Lucky Symbol (幸运符号); 3. Happy Island Tour (快乐环岛); 4. In the Name of My Faith (信仰之名)
Our Time	Released: December 15, 2017; Label: Time Fengjun Entertainment; Formats: CD, Digital Download; Track listing: 1. Our Time (我们的时光); 2. Hide and Seek (躲猫猫); 3. Imperfect Child (不完美小孩); 4. It's You (是你); 5. Fairy (小精灵); 6. Homeward – Karry's solo (小棉袄 – 王俊凯单曲); 7. Grown Up – Roy's solo (长大以后的世界 – 王源单曲); 8. You Say – Jackson's solo (你说 – 易烊千玺单曲); 9. Try my Heart (真心话太冒险); 10. Firefly (萤火)

== Singles ==
=== As lead artist ===
Title	Year	Peak chart positions			Notes
Title	Year	CHN Air.	CHN TME	CHN V	Notes
"In the Name of My Faith" (信仰之名)	2014	—	—	1	
"Big Dreamer" (大梦想家)	2015	—	—	1	
"Imperfect Child" (不完美小孩)	2016	—	—	—	Used as theme song of The Floating Plane
"Truth or Dare" (真心话太冒险)	2016	—	—	—	
"It's You" (是你)	2016	—	—	—	
"The Little Elf" (小精灵)	2016	—	—	—	
"Firefly" (萤火)	2016	—	—	2	
"Our Times" (我们的时光)	2017	1	—	—	
"Hide and Seek" (躲猫猫)	2017	—	—	—	
"I Have An Appointment with 2035" (我和2035有個約)	2018	—	—	—	CCTV Spring Festival Gala limited song
"The Best Years" (最好的那年)	2018	—	27	—	
"I Like You" (喜欢你)	2018	1	17	—	
"My Friends" (我的朋友)	2019	—	3	—	
"First Love Confession" (第一次告白)	2019	—	3	—	
"Be With You" (和你在一起)	2020	—	2	—	
"Lights" (灯火)	2020	—	5	—	
"See You Tomorrow" (明天见)	2023	—	3	—	

=== Promotional singles ===
Title	Year	Peak chart positions	Notes
Title	Year	CHN V	Notes
"We Are the Heirs of Communism" (我们是共产主义接班人) (featuring Han Geng)	2016	—	Promotional song of Young Pioneers of China
"Dreams Lantern" (梦想天灯) (featuring Yu Quan)	2016	—	Promotional song of Tingyi Beef Noodles
"Protecting Home" (守护家)	2016	2	Promotional song of Safeguard
"Give Me happiness" (给我的快乐)	2016	—	Promotional song of Fanta
"Sunshine in the Eyes" (瞳孔里的太阳) (featuring various artists)	2016	—	Promotional song of 2016 World AIDS Day

== Soundtrack appearances ==
Title	Year	Peak chart positions		Album
Title	Year	CHN Air.	CHN V	Album
"Sing As I Like" (想唱就唱)	2014	—	—	No Zuo No Die OST
"The First Lesson" (开学第一课)	2014	—	—	Theme song of Kai Xue Di Yi Ke
"Love of The Journey to The West" (恋西游)	2015	—	—	Meng Huan Xi You 2 OST
"Fight for Future" (未来的进击)	2016	—	—	Finding Soul OST
"Endless River" (不息之河)	2016	—	—	The Warriors OST
"Go! Go! Amigo!" (加油！Amigo)	2017	1	1	Boy Hood OST
"Same Second Happiness" (同一秒快乐)	2017	—	—	Theme song of Happy Camp
