= Dong Zijian =

Chinese actor (born 1993)

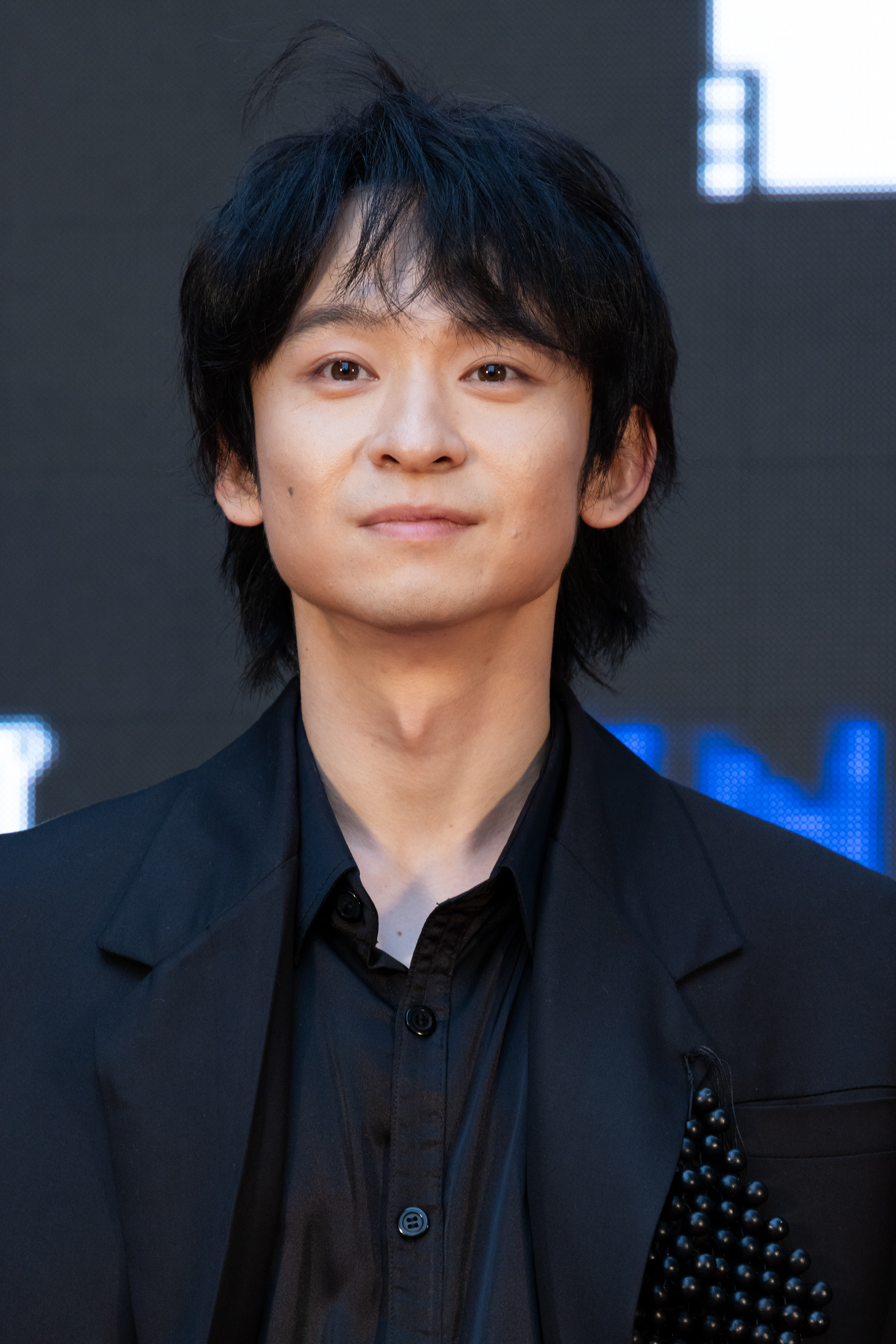
- Dong at the 37th Tokyo International Film Festival in October 2024
- Born: December 19, 1993 (age 32); Beijing, China
- Education: Central Academy of Drama
- Occupations: Actor; television producer
- Years active: 2013–present
- Spouse: Sun Yi (m. 2017; div. 2022)
- Children: 1
- Parent(s): Dong Zhi Hua; Wang Jing Hua

Dong Zijian (Chinese: 董子健, born 19 December 1993) is a Chinese actor. He is best known for his roles in Young Style (2013), Mountains May Depart (2015), De Lan (2015), and At Cafe 6 (2016).

== Early life and education ==
Dong is born in Beijing, China. His father, Dong Zhi Hua is also an actor; and his mother, Wang Jing Hua is an artist manager in China. He studied at the Beijing Haidian Foreign Language Shi Yan School, Yew Chung International School of Beijing and Beijing No.80 Middle School in his earlier years. In 2014, he was admitted to the Central Academy of Drama.

== Career ==
Dong made his debut in the youth drama film Young Style by Liu Jie, for which he won the Best Actor award at the China Movie Channel Media Awards.

In 2014, Dong featured in the horror film Bunshinsaba 3, directed by Ahn Byeong-ki; followed by the youth drama film The Ark of Mr. Chow.

In 2015, he was nominated for the Best Actor award at the Cannes Film Festival for his performance in Mountains May Depart, a realistic melodrama pic directed by Jia Zhangke. Dong reunited with director Liu Jie to star in his film, De Lan, a rural tale that revolves around a loan officer who travels to a remote village and strikes up a complicated relationship with a Tibetan woman. De Lan won the Best Feature Film award at the Shanghai International Film Festival.

In 2016, he starred in the Taiwanese coming-of-age film At Cafe 6. He also had a supporting role in the thriller film Hide and Seek which co-starred Wallace Huo.

In 2017, Dong starred in Young Love Lost, a comedy film by first-time director Xiang Guoqiang. He was praised for his excellent portrayal as a young roustabout who has no clear goals. He also featured in Han Han's drama film Duckweed, and patriotic war film The Founding of an Army as Deng Xiaoping. The same year, Dong was cast as one of the three protagonists in Namiya, the Chinese remake of Japanese novel Miracles of the Namiya General Store.

In 2018, Dong starred in the comedy film Dude's Manual. The same year, Dong made his small-screen debut in the television series Like a Flowing River, based on the novel Da Jiang Dong Qu by Ah Nai and set in the period of Chinese economic reform. Forbes China listed Dong under their 30 Under 30 Asia 2017 list which consisted of 30 influential people under 30 years old who have had a substantial effect in their fields.

== Personal life ==
On May 7, 2017, Dong and actress Sun Yi announced that they were getting married. The couple later welcomed a baby girl named Dong Dafu in September. They announced their divorce in August 2022.

== Filmography ==
=== Film ===
Year	English title	Chinese title	Role	Notes/Ref.
2013	Young Style	青春派	Ju Ran	
2014	Bunshinsaba 3	笔仙III	Zi Jian	
2015	The Ark of Mr. Chow	少年班	Wu Wei	
2015	Mountains May Depart	山河故人	Dao Le	
2015	De Lan	德蘭	Xiao Wang	
2016	At Cafe 6	六弄咖啡馆	Guan Min-lü	
2016	Hide and Seek	捉迷藏	Lulu's boyfriend	
2017	Young Love Lost	少年巴比伦	Lu Xiaolu	
2017	Duckweed	乘風破浪	Xiao Ma	
2017	The Founding of an Army	建軍大業	Deng Xiaoping	
2017	Namiya	解憂雜貨店	Ah Jie	
2018	Dude's Manual	完全男生手册	He Xiaoyang	
2018	Ash Is Purest White	江湖儿女	(Fengjie) Police	
2019	Youthful China in the Headlines	头条里的青春中国		Short film
2020	My People, My Homeland	我和我的家乡	Dong Kexue	
2021	A Writer's Odyssey	刺杀小说家	Lu Kongwen	
2024	My Friend An Delie	我的朋友安德烈	An Delie	Also director
2025	A Writer's Odyssey 2	刺杀小说家2	Lu Kongwen	

=== Television series ===
Year	English title	Chinese title	Role	Ref.
2018	Like a Flowing River	大江大河	Yang Xun	
2020	Like a Flowing River 2	大江大河2	Yang Xun	
2020	Little Doctor	小大夫	Guo Jing	
2020	My Best Friend's Story	流金岁月	Xie Hongzu	
2020	Who Is Murderer	谁是凶手	Xia Mu	
2023	Why Try to Change Me Now	平原上的摩西	Zhuang Shu	
2023	Fearless Blood	欢颜	Xu Tian	
2024	Like a Flowing River 3	大江大河3	Yang Xun	
2025	A Better Life	蛮好的人生	Xue Xiaozhou	

=== Variety show ===
Year	English title	Chinese title	Role	Notes/Ref.
2017	Give Me Five	高能少年团	Cast member	
2021	Oh Youth	恰好是少年	Cast member	
2022	Welcome Back to Sound 2	朋友请听好2	Cast member	

== Discography ==
Year	English title	Chinese title	Album	Notes/Ref.
2017	"Proud Youths"	骄傲的少年	Give Me Five OST	with Zhang Yishan, Wang Junkai, Liu Haoran & Darren Wang
2019	"Starry Sea"	星辰大海		For China Movie Channel Young Actors Project with 31 other actors

== Awards and nominations ==
Year	Awards	Category	Work	Result	Ref.
2013	China Movie Channel Media Awards	Best Actor	Young Style	Won	
2013	Chinese Young Generation Film Forum Awards	Best New Actor	Young Style	Won	
2013	Golden Horse Film Festival and Awards	Best New Performer	Young Style	Nominated	
2014	Beijing College Student Film Festival	Best New Performer	Young Style	Won	
2014	Changchun Film Festival	Best Actor	Young Style	Nominated	
2014	Chinese Film Media Awards	Best New Performer	Young Style	Nominated	
2015	Golden Phoenix Awards	Best New Performer	Young Style	Won	
2015	2015 Cannes Film Festival	Best Actor	Mountains May Depart	Nominated	
2015	Golden Horse Film Festival and Awards	Best Actor	De Lan	Nominated	
2017	Beijing College Student Film Festival	Best Actor	De Lan	Nominated	
2019	6th The Actors of China Award Ceremony	Best Actor (Emerald Category)	Like a Flowing River	Nominated	
2021	27th Shanghai Television Festival	Best Supporting Actor	Like a Flowing River 2	Nominated	
2024	29th Shanghai Television Festival	Best Supporting Actor	Like a Flowing River 3	Nominated	
