= Zhang Yishan =

Chinese actor

- 张一山
- Born: 5 May 1992 (age 34); Xicheng District, Beijing, China
- Education: Beijing Film Academy
- Occupation: Actor
- Years active: 2004–present
- Agent(s): Beijing Huacheng Media Co., LTD.
- Height: 1.74 m (5 ft 9 in)

Chinese name
- Simplified Chinese: 张一山
- Traditional Chinese: 張一山
Transcriptions
Standard Mandarin
- Hanyu Pinyin: Zhāng Yīshān

Zhang Yishan (Chinese: 张一山, born 5 May 1992) is a Chinese actor. He rose to fame as a child star for his role of Liu Xing in the sitcom Home with Kids (2004). He is also known for his roles in the TV series Yu Zui (2016) and The Deer and the Cauldron (2020).

== Early life and education ==
Zhang was born and raised in Xicheng District, Beijing. When he was 5, his father sent him to Shichahai Martial Arts School to study kung fu. Through a teacher's recommendation, he was sent to a speech studio for children to study. There, he was noticed by a director who cast him in his first television project.

Zhang enrolled in Beijing Film Academy in 2011, majoring in acting. He graduated in 2014.

== Career ==
Zhang began his career at the age 9 with a minor role in Little Soldier Zhang Ga. Under the recommendation of his co-star Li Yingqi, Zhang auditioned for a role in Home with Kids, and was cast in the role of Liu Xing. The sitcom hit national TV screens in 2004, and ran for four seasons till 2007. Zhang made a significant impression with the Chinese audience with his portrayal of a naughty but witty trouble-maker, and subsequently became a popular child star in China.

Zhang began working with several Chinese film directors. He has played in some twenty Chinese films and TV series, including the 2009 production Looking for Jackie starring veteran actor Jackie Chan, and patriotic tribute The Founding of a Party in 2010. Zhang won the New Performer Award at the Golden Phoenix Awards for his performance in Deng Enming's Childhood (2011).

Zhang transitioned from his child star fame with his breakout role in the critically-acclaimed crime thriller Yu Zui (2016), based on Chang Shuxin's popular novel. In 2017, Zhang starred in the youth romance drama Shall I Compare You to a Spring Day alongside Zhou Dongyu, based on the novel Beijing, Beijing by Feng Teng. The same year, he starred in Seven Faced Man, a remake of the Korean television series Kill Me, Heal Me. In late 2017, he began filming the drama Collision, directed by Guan Hu.

In 2018, Forbes China listed Zhang under their 30 Under 30 Asia 2017 list which consisted of 30 influential people under 30 years old who have had a substantial impact in their respective fields.

In 2019, Zhang featured in Chong Er's Preach, in which he played Duke Hui of Jin. In 2020, Zhang starred as the protagonist Wei Xiaobao in The Deer and the Cauldron, a television series adapted from Jin Yong's classic wuxia novel of the same name. The series, affected by censorship and unfavorably compared with earlier adaptations, was critically panned and marked a setback to Zhang's career revival following Yu Zui.

== Filmography ==
=== Film ===
Year	English title	Chinese title	Role	Notes
2008	Slam	扣篮对决	Monkey	
2009	Looking for Jackie	寻找成龙	Zhang Yishan	
2010	Bruce Lee, My Brother	李小龙我的兄弟	Liu Lianguang	
2011	The Founding of a Party	建党伟业	Deng Enming	
2011	Deng Enming's Childhood	少年邓恩铭	Deng Enming (young)	
2012	Southern Snow	南方大冰雪	Yang Huahua	
2012	All for Love	三个未婚妈妈	Mei Ling's brother	
2013	Little Tigers	小小飞虎队	Peng Liang	
2015	Money Game	黄金福将	Xiao Shan	
2015	Mr. Six	老炮儿	Huang Mao	Cameo
2016	Escape Route	夺路而逃	Zhou Xiaoyi	
2016	Room 704	凄灵室	Tong Shan	
2017	Battle of Xiangjiang River	血战湘江	Li Tianyou	
2017	Fake Guardians	冒牌监护人之寻宝闹翻天	Zi Chu	
2018	Love Trip	毕业作品	Yin Hao	
2018	A Paper Marriage	一纸婚约	Li Chao	
2019	The Bugle from Gutian	古田军号	Lin Biao	

=== Television series ===
Year	English title	Chinese title	Role	Notes
2004–2007	Home with Kids	家有儿女	Liu Xing	Season 1-4
2004	Little Soldier Zhang Ga	小兵张嘎	Tong Le	
2005	Who Pays for Love	谁为爱情买单	Kong Xixi	
2007		船政风云	Xiao Su	
2009	Don't Want to Grow Up	不想长大	Cousin Da Niu	
2009	Born After 1980	生于80后	Liu Dao	
2009	In the Wildest Fantasy	妙想天开	A Gan	
2010	Yuan Yuan's Story	圆圆的故事		Cameo
2012	Star City 2	星光都市2	Zhou Hao	
2013	Father Comes Home	老爸回家	Gao He	
2013	Love is not Blind	失恋33天		Cameo
2014	Childbearing Age	食来孕转	Gao Rui	
2014	Love You Most	最爱·你	Xia Xiaobing	
2014	Rid Of The Bandits	杀寇决	Lu Zizheng	
2015	Melting Pot	大熔炉	Xu Xiaobin	
2016	The Big Foot Soldiers	大号小兵	Mao Qing	
2016	Yu Zui	余罪	Yu Zui	Web series
2016	My Father, My Soldier	我的父亲我的兵	Cun Zilong	
2017	Shall I Compare You to a Spring Day	春风十里，不如你	Qiu Shui	
2017	A Seven-Faced Man	柒个我	Shen Jizhen	Web series
2018	Home with Kids: Initial Growth	家有儿女初长成	Jiang Bei	
2019	Chong Er's Preach	重耳传	Yi Wu	
2019	Green Valley	青谷子	Jiao Dalou	
2025	The Wonderful World	亲爱的你	Xu Tian / Zhou Tong	
TBA	Collision	大叔与少年	Ren Shaopeng	
TBA	Inside Man	局中人	Shen Fang	
TBA	The Deer and the Cauldron	鹿鼎记	Wei Xiaobao	

=== Variety show ===
Year	English title	Chinese title	Role	Notes
2017	Give Me Five	高能少年团	Cast member	
2018	This is Fighting Robots	这！就是铁甲	Cast member	
2018	Give Me Five (Season 2)	高能少年团2	Cast member	

== Discography ==
Year	English title	Chinese title	Album	Notes
2008	"Online Palace"	网络宫殿	—N/a	
2010	"Yishan's Happy Times"	一山好锋光	—N/a	
2010	"Surprise Scream"	惊声尖叫	—N/a	
2017	"Kungfu Yoga"	功夫瑜伽	Kung Fu Yoga OST	with Jackie Chan & Yang Zi
2017	"Proud Youths"	骄傲的少年	Give Me Five OST	with Dong Zijian, Wang Junkai, Liu Haoran & Darren Wang
2017	"If I Love You"	如果我爱你	Shall I Compare You to a Spring Day OST	with Zhou Dongyu
2018		强国一代有我在	—N/a	Promotional song for CCYL

== Awards and nominations ==
Year	Award	Category	Nominated work	Result	Ref.
2009	2nd Huading Awards	Best New Actor	—N/a	Won	
2013	14th Golden Phoenix Awards	Newcomer Award	Deng Enming's Childhood	Won	
2017	9th Macau International Movie Festival	Best Supporting Actor	A Paper Marriage	Nominated	
2017	4th The Actors of China Award Ceremony	Best Actor (Web series)	A Seven-Faced Man	Won	
2018	24th Huading Awards	Best Actor (Modern Drama)	A Seven-Faced Man	Nominated	

=== Forbes China Celebrity 100 ===
Year	Rank	Ref.
2017	70th	
2019	44th	
2020	48th	
