= Under the Light =

2023 film directed by Zhang Yimou

- Theatrical release poster
- Traditional Chinese: 堅如磐石
- Simplified Chinese: 坚如磐石
- Literal meaning: Solid as a rock
- Hanyu Pinyin: Jiān rú pánshí
- Directed by: Zhang Yimou
- Written by: Chen Yu
- Produced by: Pang Liwei
- Starring: Lei Jiayin; Zhang Guoli; Yu Hewei; Zhou Dongyu
- Cinematography: Zhao Xiaoding; Luo Pan
- Music by: Jo Yeong-wook
- Production companies: Beijing Enlight Pictures; Beijing Hanli Film
- Distributed by: Beijing Enlight Pictures
- Release date: September 28, 2023
- Running time: 127 minutes
- Country: China
- Language: Mandarin
- Box office: $190 million

Under the Light (Chinese: 坚如磐石) is a 2023 Chinese crime drama film directed by Zhang Yimou. It tells the story of police officer Su Jianming (Lei Jiayin) and Li Huilin (Zhou Dongyu) as they join forces to investigate a criminal case connected to the local wealthy businessman Li Zhitian (Yu Hewei). The film was released in theaters in China on September 28, 2023.

== Plot ==
To investigate the truth behind a bus explosion case, Su Jianming defies the warnings of his powerful and influential father, Zheng Gang, and rushes to attend a banquet hosted by wealthy businessman Li Zhitian. There, Su witnesses Li's brazen and cruel display of power, which includes humiliating others and plunging his hand into a boiling hotpot. As the night unfolds, shocking clues gradually surface: a corpse hidden in a wall, a deadly assault with a wrench, and the under-the-table transfer of nearly ten billion yuan.

== Cast ==
- Lei Jiayin as Su Jianming
- Zhang Guoli as Zheng Gang
- Yu Hewei as Li Zhitian
- Zhou Dongyu as Li Huilin
- Sun Yizhou as David
- Li Naiwen as Liu Feng
- Xu Yajun as Liu Bo
- Tian Yu as Tang Danian
- Xu Zili as Sun Heyang
- He Zhengjun as Wen Hui
- Chen Daoming as Chen Weimin
- Joan Chen as He Xiuli
- Wang Xun

== Production ==
The film's original literal title is Black Hole. Casting began in May 2019 at the Meishi Film Academy of Chongqing University. Filming officially started later that same month and wrapped in September of the same year.

The film also marked the second collaboration between Zhang Yimou and Zhou Dongyu since her breakthrough film Under the Hawthorn Tree thirteen years prior.

== Release ==
Produced by Beijing Enlight Pictures and Beijing Hanli Film, the trailer was released on June 8, 2020.

Originally scheduled for release in 2020, the film underwent multiple rounds of edits, reshoots, and redubbing (the original version was filmed in the Chongqing dialect) because its storyline was suspected to be loosely based on Bo Xilai, the former mayor of Chongqing, and Wang Lijun, the former police chief of the city. It was later scheduled for release on September 28, 2023, during the National Day holiday release window.

== Reception ==
John Berra of Screen International gave the film a mixed review, praising Zhang Yimou's direction while noting that the screenplay's numerous plotlines and machinations made the story difficult to follow.
