= Banana Pictures =

Defunct Chinese film producer and distributor

- Industry: motion picture
- Founded: 2015
- Key people: Wang Sicong (founder); Wei Xiandong (CEO)
- Products: film
- Parent: Banana Culture

Banana Pictures was a film distributor and production company founded by Wang Sicong. It is a subsidiary of the Banana Project Culture Development Co., Ltd, an entertainment firm known as Banana Culture.

On April 28, 2018, the firm released its first film, the romantic drama Us and Them. The film collected $196.29 million at the box office.

== History ==
Wang Sicong established Project Banana Filming Co., Ltd., including a film studio known as Banana Pictures, in October 2015.

Banana Pictures initiated the Excavation Program, a new director discovery program that is to identify young directors (under 39) in September, 2017.

In June, 2018, it originated the Fulfilling Program, a new screenwriters dream fulfillment project that is to discover young screenwriters (under 46).

== Filmography ==
- Us and Them (2018) – investor, the film earned $191 million over its first two weekends.
