= Namiya =

- Theatrical release poster
- Traditional Chinese: 解憂雜貨店
- Simplified Chinese: 解忧杂货店
- Hanyu Pinyin: Jiě yōu zá huò diàn
- Directed by: Han Jie
- Screenplay by: Han Jie; Zhu Siyi; Sun Siyu; Tiger Xiao
- Based on: Miracles of the Namiya General Store by Keigo Higashino
- Produced by: Gary Cheng; Defu Jiang; Takeo Kodera; Albert Lee; Kim-Chau Shiu; Barbie Tung
- Starring: Karry Wang; Dilraba Dilmurat; Dong Zijian
- Cinematography: Chris Lee
- Edited by: Chi-Leung Kwong
- Music by: Nathan Wang
- Production companies: Emperor Motion Pictures; PMF Pictures; Wanda Media; Haining Sunshine Films; Pebble Stone Production
- Distributed by: China Lion Film Distribution
- Release date: 29 December 2017 (China)
- Running time: 110 minutes
- Country: China
- Language: Mandarin
- Box office: $35,342,550

Namiya is a 2017 Chinese fantasy film directed by Han Jie, based on the 2012 novel Miracles of the Namiya General Store by Keigo Higashino. It stars Jackie Chan as the titular shop owner, with Dilraba Dilmurat, Karry Wang and Hao Lei in supporting role. It was released on 29 December 2017 in China.

== Cast ==
- Karry Wang as Xiao Bo
- Dilraba Dilmurat as Tong Tong
- Dong Zijian as Ah Jie
- Qin Hao as Hao Bo
- Lee Hong-chi as Qin Lang
- Hao Lei as Da Qingmei
- Chen Duling as Xiao Qingmei
- Jackie Chan as Namiya

== Production ==
The film was produced by Emperor Motion Pictures, PMF Pictures and Wanda Media. Its trailer was released on December 2, 2017.
