= Shall I Compare You to a Spring Day =

- Also known as: Spring Breeze Ten Miles; Spring Breeze Ten Miles, As You
- Genre: Romance; Youth
- Based on: Beijing Beijing by Feng Tang
- Written by: Zhou Yong; Xu Pengpeng; Han Peng
- Directed by: Ma Jin
- Starring: Zhang Yishan; Zhou Dongyu
- Opening theme: If I Love You by Zhang Yishan & Zhou Dongyu
- Ending theme: Shall I Compare You to a Spring Day Can't Be Compared to You by Li Jian
- Country of origin: China
- Original language: Chinese
- No. of episodes: 40

Production
- Producer: Hu Zhenpeng
- Production location: Beijing
- Running time: 45 minutes
- Production companies: Beijing Donghai Qilin Media Co., Ltd; Youku; Mountain Top; Beijing Jetsen Technology; Wuren Studio; Zhou Dongyu Studio

Original release
- Network: Youku; Shandong Television
- Release: 21 July – 15 September 2017

Shall I Compare You to a Spring Day (Chinese: 春风十里，不如你) is a 2017 Chinese television series based on the novel Beijing, Beijing by Feng Tang. Starring Zhang Yishan and Zhou Dongyu, the series is a coming-of-age story about young love and brotherhood among a group of youths, who lived during the revolutionary times of Beijing. It premiered on Youku on 21 July 2017, and airs one episode from Monday to Friday.

== Synopsis ==
Qiu Shui is artistically inclined and loves creating literary works, but enters med school according to his father's wishes. During military training, he meets his classmates - Xiao Hong, Xiao Bai, Zhao Yingnan etc., and gets into a relationship with Zhao Yingnan. Four years later, Qiu Shui has become a medical intern. Zhao Yingnan wants Qiu Shui to become an exemplary doctor, and she attempted to meddle in Qiu Shui's literary works. This caused Qiu Shui to struggle and doubt himself. In the end, he chooses to break up with Zhao Yingnan. Meanwhile, Xiao Hong encourages Qiu Shu to realizes his dreams, and they eventually became a couple. However, their relationship was destroyed by his mother and they were forced to separate. Many years later, Qiu Shui becomes a successful businessman and writer; and he also meets Xiao Hong again...

== Cast ==
=== Main ===
- Zhang Yishan as Qiu Shui

A playful but charming man who is well-versed in arts, business, and medical skills.

- Zhou Dongyu as Xiao Hong

A silly and childish girl who can be unrestrained in her actions, but is sincere toward people and persistent in love.

=== Supporting ===
==== Classmates ====
- You Jingru as Zhao Yingnan

Qiu Shui's first love. The female chairperson of the class. Coming from a military family, she is seen as the perfect model student for her highly disciplined nature and logical thinking.

- Chen Yilong as Xiao Bai

Qiu Shui's good friend, part of the 'troublemaker trio' with Qiu Shui and Xin Yi. An overseas returnee from San Francisco, he does not understand many things and can be blur at times. He falls in love with Xiao Hong at first sight.

- Wei Jianlong as Xin Yi

Qiu Shui's good friend, part of the 'troublemaker trio' with Qiu Shui and Xiao Bai. He likes Yao Dao.

- Yang Yue as Yao Dao

A studious girl who often wakes up early and stays up late to study English phrases.

- Zhou Shuai as Hou Pu

The male chairperson of the class. He is not good at interpersonal relationships and can be unyielding at times.

- Sun Weihao as Du Zhong

Qiu Shui's bunk mate. He is an avid gamer.

- Fang Chuan as Wang Xiuyu
- Hua Qiao as Liu Tingting
- Ma Xinyi as Gu Xiaoman
- Liu Chenglin as Huang Qi
- Sun Youyue as You Yue

==== Others ====
- Qi Xi as Liu Qing

A fellow doctor who is Qiu Shui's senior, and later becomes his girlfriend.

- Liu Chao as Instructor Dai
- Ni Songyang as Instructor Song
- Wen Liqin as Department Head Lu
- Shi Bai Xin Hui as Shi Baihui, Xiao Hong's close friend
- Wang Qian as Li Dachuan
- Wang Changchang as Zhou Xiaohe

=== Special appearance ===
- Fo Rena as Qiu Shui's mother
- Van Fan as Elder Brother Shou

== Soundtrack ==
Shall I Compare You to a Spring Day - Original Television Soundtrack (春风十里不如你电视剧原声音乐大碟)
No.	Title	Music	Length
1.	"Shall I Compare You to a Spring Day Can't Be Compared to You (春风十里不如你)" (Ending theme song)	Li Jian
2.	"Shall I Compare You to a Spring Day (春风十里)" (Promotional song)	Mr. Lu Band
3.	"If I Love You (如果我爱你)" (Opening theme song)	Zhang Yishan & Zhou Dongyu
4.	"Xiao Hong (小红)" (Xiao Hong's theme song)	Chen Yiling & Van Fan

== Awards and nominations ==
Year	Award	Category	Nominated work	Result	Ref.
2017	8th Macau International Television Festival	Best Web Series	Shall I Compare You to a Spring Day	Nominated	
2017	8th Macau International Television Festival	Best Actress	Zhou Dongyu	Nominated	
2018	29th China TV Golden Eagle Award	Outstanding Television Series	Shall I Compare You to a Spring Day	Won	
