= Yu Zui =

- Genre: Crime; Thriller
- Based on: Yu Zui by Chang Shuxin
- Written by: Shen Rong; Zhang Shidong; Jiang Wuji
- Directed by: Zhang Rui
- Starring: Zhang Yishan; Chang Rong; Wu You; Zhang Jincheng
- Opening theme: Song of Departure (离歌) by Shin
- Country of origin: China
- Original language: Chinese
- No. of seasons: 2
- No. of episodes: 12 (Season 1); 12 (Season 2)

Production
- Production companies: iQiyi New Classics Media; Zeus Entertainment.

Original release
- Network: iQiyi
- Release: 23 May 2016

Yu Zui (Chinese: 余罪) is a 2016 Chinese web series jointly produced by iQiyi, New Classics Media and Zeus Entertainment. It is based on the crime novel of the same name by Chang Shuxin, and stars Zhang Yishan in the title role. The series premiered on 23 May 2016 via iQiyi and aired for two seasons. The third season of the series is currently in production.

== Synopsis ==
It tells the story of Yu Zui, a police cadet who enters the society; and the challenges and dangers he face as an undercover cop.

=== Season One ===
A group of young students at the Police Academy gets into a fight at a local restaurant and are at risk to be expelled from the profession. Xu Pingqiu, a highly respected figure in the industry, offers them a second chance. If they are able to succeed with his training, they are able to become certified police officers and their past crimes will be erased. However, the training is very atypical. The students a dropped in the middle of an unfamiliar city with nothing other than a cellphone and bracelet, and they have to survive forty days. Through various methods, Yu Zui finds and gathers his team mates. In the midst of chaos, one of the students, Shu Biao disappears. Yu Zui finds and mistakenly kills the person who kidnapped Shu Biao. After he was imprisoned, Yu Zui discovers that he was being deceived. There, he becomes good friends with his fellow inmate, Fu Guosheng, whose actual identity is the leader of a Drug Trafficking ringleader. He becomes an undercover cop to get closer to Fu Guosheng, who later sent him to spy on Zheng Chao. Yu Zui wants to make use of the distrust between Fu Guosheng and Zheng Chao to eliminate the latter, while Zheng Chao wants to get rid of Yu Zui.

=== Season Two ===
Under Yu Zui's instigation, Zheng Chao betrays Fu Guosheng and established his own drug ring; causing him to be estranged from his former boss. Zheng Chao was later caught, and Yu Zui replaces Zheng Chao as the leader of the criminal organization. His rise to position raises Fu Guosheng's suspicion, who sends Si Hai to test him. Yu Zui discovers Fu Guosheng's plan in time, and gradually gains the latter's trust. Lin Jingyu also joins Yu Zui in his undercover mission and together the two of them tries to crack down on Fu Guosheng's crimes. At the end of the season, Fu Guosheng was arrested with the help of an unexpected person and Yu Zui rejoins his team mates at the Police Academy. However, he realizes that An Jialu is at the hands of Fu Guosheng's subordinates. Together, the team sets out to rescue An Jialu.

== Cast ==
Actor	Character	Description
Zhang Yishan	Yu Zui	A police cadet who later becomes an undercover cop.
Chang Rong	Xu Pingqiu	Chief of the Criminal Investigation team. Yu Zui's superior.
Wu You	Lin Yujing	Member of the Narcotics Squad. She develops an emotional entanglement after her fiance died in an undercover mission. After going through dangerous trials with Yu Zui, she falls in love with him.
Zhang Jincheng	Fu Guosheng	Boss of an Adult Sex Shop. His actual identity is the leader of a Drug Trafficking ringleader.
Du Zuiming	Zheng Chao	Second boss of the criminal organization.
Wang Ge	Shu Ji	A police cadet who also becomes a spy, Yu Zui's team mate.
Ge Zheng	Zhang Meng	A police cadet who is a skilled fighter.
Zhang Cheng	Luo Jialong	A police cadet who is a skilled hacker.
Bai Yihong	Wang Shenxiu	A police cadet, who is vain but loyal.
Zhang Yujian	Jie Bing	A police cadet. An intelligent man who is valued by his superiors because of his ability to solve cases. He becomes love rivals with Yu Zui.
Sun Jiayu	An Jialu	A police cadet who is extremely beautiful. Jie Bing's girlfriend.
Yu Xiao	Jiao Tou	Fu Guosheng's subordinate. A loyal and silent man.
Xu Dongdong	Shen Jiawen	Fu Guosheng's lover.
Yu Lang	Zhou Wenjuan	A police cadet who is quiet and has low self-esteem, but grows to be a capable forensic doctor.

== Reception ==
The drama received positive reception. It attracted more than 100 million views on iQiyi within days of its premiere, making it one of the most popular TV series tailored for the online platform. It also has a score of 8.9/10 on Douban, becoming one of the highest rated dramas. Television producer and critic Xie Xiaohu credits the success of “Yu Zui” to the unique character of its protagonist, who differs from the usual straight-laced, incorruptible police officers; and the show's attention-grabbing and lewd content. The background of the original writer Chang Shuxin, who was jailed decades ago and thus has a good understanding of police officers, also contributed to the success of the show.

Despite the show's success, the series was later taken off the internet. Numerous sources have pointed to China’s media regulation body, the State Administration of Press, Publication, Radio, Film, and Television (SAPPRFT), who banned the show for its explicit content.

== Awards and nominations ==
Year	Award	Category	Nominee	Result	Ref.
2016	1st Golden Guduo Media Awards	Best Web Series	Yu Zui	Won	
2016	2016 ENAwards	Top 10 Web Series	Yu Zui	Won	
2016	7th Macau International Television Festival	Outstanding Web Series	Yu Zui	Won	
2016	1st Asia New Media Film Festival	Most Popular Web Series	Yu Zui	Won	
