= Lonely Deaths Lie Thick as Snow =

Japanese manga series

- First tankōbon volume cover

降り積もれ孤独な死よ (Furitsumore Kodokuna Shi yo)
- Genre: Noir; Suspense
- Manga
- Written by: Hajime Inoryū
- Illustrated by: Shota Itō
- Published by: Kodansha
- English publisher: NA: Kodansha USA
- Imprint: Evening KC
- Magazine: Magazine Pocket
- Original run: August 28, 2021 – August 29, 2026
- Volumes: 13
- Television drama
- Directed by: Eisuke Naito; Takashi Ninomiya; Takahiro Takasugi
- Written by: Natsu Hashimoto; Takashi Ninomiya; Takahiro Takasugi
- Music by: Jun Futamata
- Studio: Fine Entertainment
- Original network: NNS (ytv, Nippon TV)
- Original run: July 7, 2024 – September 8, 2024
- Episodes: 10
- icon

Lonely Deaths Lie Thick as Snow (Japanese: 降り積もれ孤独な死よ, Hepburn: Furitsumore Kodokuna Shi yo) is a Japanese manga series written by Hajime Inoryū and illustrated by Shota Itō. It was serialized on Kodansha's Magazine Pocket website from August 2021 to August 2026. A live-action television drama adaptation aired from July to September 2024.

== Plot ==
Jin Saeki has been called up to investigate a burglary at the Haikawa mansion. As he's on the case, he later finds the corpses of 13 children, and deduces that Jūzō Haikawa, who has gone missing, is the prime suspect. Saeki later meets Kanon Hasumi, a woman who claims to be Haikawa's daughter, and tags along with her on his travels all over Japan to find clues to the new case.

== Characters ==
Jin Saeki (冴木仁, Saeki Jin)
Portrayed by: Ryo Narita
Kanon Hasumi (蓮水花音, Hasumi Kanon)
Portrayed by: Ai Yoshikawa
Jūzō Haikawa (灰川十三, Haikawa Jūzō)
Portrayed by: Fumiyo Kohinata
Jun Suzuki (鈴木潤, Suzuki Jun)
Portrayed by: Taiki Sato
Seiji Kawai (川相誠二, Kawai Seiji)
Portrayed by: Tooru Nomaguchi
Sōsuke Takimoto (瀧本蒼佑, Takimoto Sōsuke)
Portrayed by: Riku Hagiwara
Maya Okishima (沖島マヤ, Okishima Maya)
Portrayed by: Bambi Naka
Satoru Kawaguchi (川口悟, Kawaguchi Satoru)
Portrayed by: Leo Matsumoto
Takeru Kamishiro (神代健流, Kamishiro Takeru)
Portrayed by: Kazuto Mokudai
Yūma Azuma (東優磨, Azuma Yūma)
Portrayed by: Rikutani

== Media ==
=== Manga ===
Written by Hajime Inoryū and illustrated by Shota Itō, Lonely Deaths Lie Thick as Snow began serialization on Kodansha's Magazine Pocket website on August 28, 2021. The series entered its final arc with the release of its eleventh volume. The final chapter was released on August 29, 2026. The chapters have been collected into thirteen tankōbon volumes, released from November 2021 to November 2026.

During their panel at San Diego Comic-Con 2025, Kodansha USA announced that they had licensed the series for English publication beginning in Q2 2026.

==== Volumes ====
No.	Original release date	Original ISBN	English release date	English ISBN
1	November 22, 2021	978-4-06-526342-6	March 3, 2026	978-1-64729-575-2
2	March 23, 2022	978-4-06-527009-7	May 12, 2026	978-1-64729-601-8
3	July 22, 2022	978-4-06-528366-0	July 21, 2026	978-1-64729-605-6
4	October 21, 2022	978-4-06-529744-5	September 8, 2026	978-1-64729-606-3
5	March 23, 2023	978-4-06-530879-0	November 3, 2026	978-1-64729-607-0
6	September 22, 2023	978-4-06-532932-0	February 16, 2027	978-1-64729-608-7
7	June 21, 2024	978-4-06-535124-6	April 27, 2027	978-1-64729-609-4
8	July 23, 2024	978-4-06-536332-4	—	—
9	February 21, 2025	978-4-06-538482-4	—	—
10	August 22, 2025	978-4-06-540403-4	—	—
11	December 23, 2025	978-4-06-541994-6	—	—
12	April 23, 2026	978-4-06-543342-3	—	—
13	November 20, 2026	978-4-06-546122-8	—	—

=== Drama ===
A live-action television drama adaptation aired on YTV and Nippon TV for ten episodes from July 7 to September 8, 2024.

== Reception ==
The series was ranked 28th in Da Vinci's 2024 Book of the Year Ranking.

== See also ==
- My Dearest Self with Malice Aforethought, another manga series by the same creators
