= Mystery Virgin =

Single by Ryosuke Yamada
- B-side: "Asia no Yoru"; "Moonlight"; "Gin no Sekai ni Negai wo Komete"; "Ai no Katamari"; "Asia no Yoru (Chinoiserie Ver.)"
- Released: January 9, 2013
- Recorded: 2012
- Genre: J-Pop
- Length: 8:00 (Limited Edition 1); 7:49 (Limited Edition 2); 29:54 (Regular Edition); 16:00 (NTV Drama Edition)
- Label: J Storm
- Songwriter(s): Vandrythem, Takuya Watanabe, Atanegaku, Ryosuke Yamada, Tsuyoshi Domoto
- Producer(s): Erik Lidbom, Daichi, Yasumasa Sato, Akira Mitake, Takuya Watanabe, QQ, Jun Suyama, Takugoro Moriyama, Taro Makido, Koichi Domoto, Ken Yoshida

"Mystery Virgin" (ミステリー ヴァージン) is the first solo single by the Japanese idol Ryosuke Yamada after his success as a member of the popular Japanese all-male band, Hey! Say! JUMP. The song was produced and written by Vandrythem, Erik Lidbom and Daichi. It was released to mainstream radio on November 30, 2012, and was available for digital download on December 26, 2012. The song was physically released on January 9, 2013. "Mystery Virgin" was written as the ending theme song for the fourth season of the popular Japanese drama television series, Kindaichi Case Files Neo SP1: Hong Kong Kowloon Treasure Murder Case in which Yamada also played the main role, Hajime Kindaichi.

In Japan, "Mystery Virgin" debuted at #1 on the Oricon chart, making him the first teenage male artist in 33 years to have a number one debut single and one of only two artists to achieve this milestone. The fact that Yamada was only in his teens at the time the single reached #1 helped the singer set several new records in the Japanese music industry. In Japan, although many teen bands frequently top the charts, the industry lacked young solo male artists for over two decades and this is said to be a factor that contributed to the single's success.

Yamada performed the song in a number of live appearances including Best Artist 2012, Shounen Club, Johnnys' World and Music Japan.

== Background and composition ==
"Mystery Version" was specially written as the theme song for the fifth season of the popular Japanese television drama series, Kindaichi Case Files, in which Yamada starred. In explaining the concept of the song, Yamada said, "I think the song is perfect for [the] Kindaichi [television series]. There are a lot of words and phrases that link to the story." The lyric, "In the name of the future..." is a pun for the character's famous catch phrase, "In the name of my grandfather...". The show was broadcast on January 12, 2013, three days after the single's release.

The song is predominantly upbeat, featuring Yamada's unique dance style along with the dance infused beat.

Yamada wrote the B-side, "Gin no Sekai ni Negai wo Komete", recorded in the Regular Edition. He started writing the song in 2011, essentially to be performed by Hey! Say! JUMP, but after his first solo single was decided, he changed the lyrics and transformed it into a song designed for a solo vocal.

== Release ==
The single was originally set to be physically released on January 9, 2013, in three different formats: Limited Edition 1, Limited Edition 2 and Regular Edition, although it was later revealed a new version, NTV Limited Drama Edition, would be released for a limited period of time until January 31, 2013.

Limited Edition 1 and 2 contained a CD and a DVD. Along with "Mystery Virgin", Edition 1 included "Asia no Yoru"（Japanese:アジアの夜, literally A Night in Asia） as the B-side and a DVD with a "Mystery Virgin" music video. Edition 2 included "Moonlight" as the B-side and a DVD with a "Moonlight" music video. Both DVDs contained a short filming footage of each music video. The Regular Edition contained "Gin no Sekai ni Negai wo Komete" (Japanese: 銀の世界に願いを込めて, literally Wish Upon a Silver World) and a cover version of "Ai no Katamari"（Japanese: 愛のかたまり, literally Mass Of Love）as the B-side. The former was written by Yamada and the latter was composed by popular Japanese duo, KinKi Kids, who first released the song in 2001. The single also included instrumental versions of the three songs.

On December 14, 2012, J Storm revealed that a new version of the single, titled NTV Limited Drama Edition, would be added. Along with "Mystery Virgin", it included a Chinoiserie version of "Asia no Yoru". The cover art for this version differed from the other three, showing Yamada as Hajime Kindaichi, the role he played in the NTV drama series, Kindaichi Case Files.

== Promotion ==
Since Yamada was starring in the musical Johnnys' World from November 2012 to January 2013, he was not able to actively promote the single live on television as he had with his previous singles. He premiered the song on November 28, 2012, on Best Artist 2012. On December 31, 2012, Yamada performed the B-side track "Ai no Katamari" with KinKi Kids on Johnnys' Countdown Live. He performed "Mystery Virgin" on television twice in December 2012 and three times in January 2013.

From January 1, 2013, the Yamanote Line with a temporary "Mystery Virgin" wrap advertising started running to promote the single. The entire train was painted with the single's cover art and title logo. All posters and advertisements inside the vehicle were removed and transformed into a promotion dedicated train. The television screens inside the vehicle were also changed. The commercials and weather reports that are usually broadcast were removed and the music video for "Mystery Virgin" and "Moonlight" were the only two clips shown.

== Chart performance ==
In Japan, "Mystery Virgin" debuted at #1 on the Oricon chart, for the issue dated January 21, 2013, making Yamada the first teenage male artist in 33 years to have a #1 debut single as well as being one of only two artists to achieve this milestone. He is also the first teenage male artist in 28 years to have a #1 single. He is currently the only teenage male artist with a #1 single in the 21st century and the first male artist born in the Heisei period with a #1 single.

"Mystery Virgin" sold 87,555 copies on the day of its release and 188,862 copies in its first week. The song remained at the top 10 the following week, selling another 13,592 copies. It had sold over 215,000 copies by February 2013.

== Music video ==
Filming for the music video took place in November 2012. Yamada joined the director and participated in the composition of the concept. Two music videos were filmed, "Mystery Virgin" and "Moonlight", the former included in Limited Edition 1 and the latter in Limited Edition 2 on DVD.

The leather jacket Yamada wore in the "Mystery Virgin" music video was designed by the singer himself.

== Live performances ==
Yamada premiered the song on November 28, 2012, live on Best Artist 2012. He later performed the song on December 5 on The Shounen Club. On December 9, 2012, Yamada performed the song on a weekly variety show he appears in, School Kakumei. He guest starred in The Shounen Club again on January 9, 2013, on the day of its release. On January 13, 2013, he guest starred in Music Japan.

From November 10, 2012, to January 27, 2013, Yamada starred in Johnnys' World, a musical performed at the Imperial Garden Theater in Tokyo, created in celebration of Johnny Kitagawa's certification by Guinness World Records for producing the most number of artists who have claimed number one in the charts. For three months, Yamada performed "Mystery Virgin" during the second act in a total of 103 stage performances.

== Songs ==
- Limited Edition 1 – single (CD+DVD)
1. "Mystery Virgin" – 4:26
2. "Asia no Yoru" – 3:34
3. "Mystery Virgin" (music video)
4. "Mystery Virgin" (making of)
- Limited Edition 2 – single (CD+DVD)
1. "Mystery Virgin" –4:26
2. "Moonlight" – 3:23
3. "Moonlight" (music video)
4. "Moonlight" (making of)
- Regular Edition – single (CD)
1. "Mystery Virgin" – 4:26
2. "Gin no Sekai ni Negai wo Komete" – 5:43
3. "Ai no Katamari" – 4:48
4. "Mystery Virgin" (instrumental) – 4:26
5. "Gin no Sekai ni Negai wo Komete" (instrumental) – 5:43
6. "Ai no Katamari" (instrumental) – 4:48
- NTV Limited Drama Edition - single (CD)
1. "Mystery Virgin" – 4:26
2. "Asia no Yoru Chinoiserie Ver." – 3:34
3. "Mystery Virgin" (instrumental) – 4:26
4. "Asia no Yoru Chinoiserie Ver." (instrumental) – 3:34

== Credits and personnel ==
- Songwriting – Vandrythem, Takuya Watanabe, Atanegaku, Ryosuke Yamada, Tsuyoshi Domoto
- Production – Erik Kidbom, Daichi, Yasumasa Sato, Akira Mitake, Takuya Watanabe, QQ, Jun Suyama, Takugoro Moriyama, Taro Makido, Koichi Domoto, Ken Yoshida

== Charts and certifications ==
| Chart (2013) | Peak position | Certifications |
|---|---|---|
| Japan (Oricon) | 1 | Gold |
| Japan (Japan Hot 100) | 1 | Gold |
