= Mountains May Depart =

2015 Chinese drama film

- Film poster
- Chinese: 山河故人
- Literal meaning: Old friends amid the mountains and rivers
- Hanyu Pinyin: Shānhé Gùrén
- Directed by: Jia Zhangke
- Written by: Jia Zhangke
- Produced by: Ren Zhonglun; Nathanaël Karmitz; Liu Shiyu; Shozo Ichiyama
- Starring: Zhao Tao; Zhang Yi; Liang Jingdong; Dong Zijian
- Cinematography: Yu Lik-wai
- Edited by: Matthieu Laclau
- Music by: Yoshihiro Hanno
- Production companies: Xstream Pictures; Shanghai Film Group; MK2
- Distributed by: Sihai Distribution Association (China); Tianjin Maoyan Media (China); Ad Vitam (France)
- Release dates: 20 May 2015 (Cannes); 30 October 2015 (China); 23 December 2015 (France); 23 April 2016 (Japan)
- Running time: 131 minutes
- Countries: China; France; Japan
- Languages: Jin Chinese; Mandarin
- Box office: CN¥32.22 million (China); US$79,768 (United States)

Mountains May Depart (Chinese: 山河故人) is a 2015 Mandarin-language drama film and the 8th feature film directed by Jia Zhangke. It competed for the Palme d'Or at the 2015 Cannes Film Festival. and was also selected to be shown in the Special Presentations section of the 2015 Toronto International Film Festival.

== Plot ==
In 1999 Fenyang, 25-year-old shopkeeper Tao finds herself in a love-triangle between Liangzi, a poor laborer in a local coal mine who has unrequited feelings for her, and Jinsheng, a well-off gas station owner who, despite being pompous and cruel, she is more attracted to. Tao's affection for Jinsheng sets off a confrontation between her two suitors that eventually turns violent. When Tao and Jinsheng decide to get married, Liangzi, feeling incapable of maintaining a platonic friendship with Tao, leaves town.

In 2014, Tao and Jinsheng are now divorced. Tao still lives in Fenyang, runs the gas station and is known for her generosity, while Jinsheng has since remarried, moved to Shanghai and become a wealthy venture capitalist. Liangzi returns from his job as a miner near Handan; suffering from black lung, he receives financial help from Tao. Tao and Jinsheng's 7-year-old son, Daole (Dollar in English), comes to attend the funeral of Tao's father. Tao is upset by how distant he has become, and behaves surly towards him. Knowing they are fated to be apart as Daole and Jinsheng are soon to emigrate to Australia, Tao decides to ride the slow train with Daole to spend more time with him. As a parting gift, she gives Daole a set of keys for her house so that he can return to his home whenever he wants.

In 2025, Daole (now going by Dollar) is attending college in Australia. He constantly fights with his father over his desire to drop out and have the freedom he was never granted in his childhood. He develops feelings for Mia, an older woman and his Chinese language teacher, and the two eventually begin a relationship. Dollar shares with Mia how he still carries the keys his mother gave him when he was a young boy, and that he fears she may die even though they have not talked for years. Mia asks him to fly back to China with her so that he can see Tao, though he is hesitant. Back in Fenyang, Tao recalls the song "Go West" and dances alone in the snow.

== Cast ==
- Zhao Tao
- Zhang Yi
- Liang Jingdong
- Dong Zijian
- Sylvia Chang
- Rong Zishan
- Liang Yonghao
- Liu Lu
- Yuan Wenqian

== Reception ==
=== Box office ===
The film earned CN¥32.22 million at the Chinese box office.

=== Critical reception ===
Mountains May Depart holds a 79/100 average on review aggregation site Metacritic. Peter Bradshaw of The Guardian wrote, "Jia Zhang-ke’s Mountains May Depart is a mysterious and in its way staggeringly ambitious piece of work from a film-maker whose creativity is evolving before our eyes."

Scott Foundas of Variety states "Mountains May Depart is never less than a work of soaring ambition and deeply felt humanism, as Jia longs not so much to turn back the hands of time, but to ever so slightly slow them down."

Derek Elley of Film Business Asia gave it a 5 out of 10, calling the film a "weakly written saga of friendship [that] goes way off the rails in the final part."

== Music ==
- "Go West" (1993) by the Pet Shop Boys
- "Take care" (Chinese: 珍重, 1990) by Sally Yeh (Chinese: 葉倩文)

Go West plays a prominent role in the film as the film opens to a scene on New Year's Eve 1999 with Tao happily dancing to the song with friends and closes in 2025 with a scene of Tao crying and dancing along to it near an old pagoda in the snow. Incidentally, in both scenes, Tao gestures with her arm to make waves, and "Tao" means waves in Chinese. In an interview with AV Club Jia states that he was attempting to evoke a "collective history for that generation."
