= Zhou Dongyu =

Chinese actress

- 周冬雨
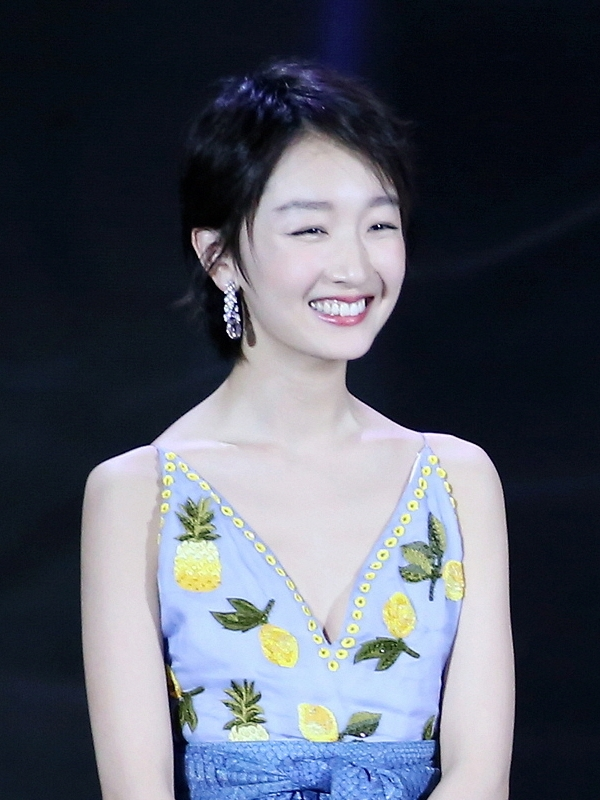
- Zhou in 2017
- Born: 31 January 1992 (age 34) (Note: Earlier articles mentioned she was born in the layue of 1991 of the Chinese calendar, which is in fact early 1992 in the Gregorian calendar.); Shijiazhuang, Hebei, China
- Education: Beijing Film Academy
- Occupation: Actress
- Years active: 2010–present
- Agent: Zhou Dongyu Studio
- Notable work: Better Days; Under the Light; My People, My Country
- Awards: Hong Kong Film Award for Best Actress - Better Days (2020); Golden Rooster Award for Best Leading Actress - Soul Mate (2016 film)

Chinese name
- Chinese: 周冬雨
- Hanyu Pinyin: Zhōu Dōngyǔ

Zhou Dongyu (Chinese: 周冬雨; born 31 January 1992) is a Chinese actress. She rose to fame for her role in Zhang Yimou's film Under the Hawthorn Tree (2010). She is also known for her roles in Soul Mate (2016), for which she won the Golden Horse Award for Best Leading Actress, Us and Them (2018), and Better Days (2019), for which she won both the Hong Kong Film Award for Best Actress and Golden Rooster Award for Best Actress.

Zhou was named by Southern Metropolis Daily as one of the "Four Dan actresses of the post-90s Generation". She ranked 71st on Forbes China Celebrity 100 list in 2017, 7th in 2019, and 3rd in 2020.

== Early life and education ==
Zhou was born in Shijiazhuang, Hebei to an ordinary working family. When she was in the third grade of primary school, her father died in a car accident, and her mother later remarried. She practiced gymnastics as a child and joined the Shijiazhuang gymnastics team at the age of 12. In middle school, she studied in Shijiazhuang No. 27 Middle School Class 9 in 2004 and Shijiazhuang No. 12 Middle School in Class 2007.

== Career ==
=== 2010–2015: Rising recognition ===
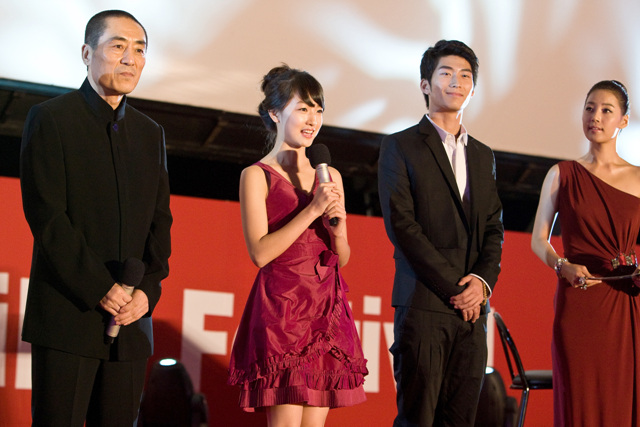
Zhou Dongyu (second from left) during the premiere of Under the Hawthorn Tree at Busan International Film Festival 2010, South Korea

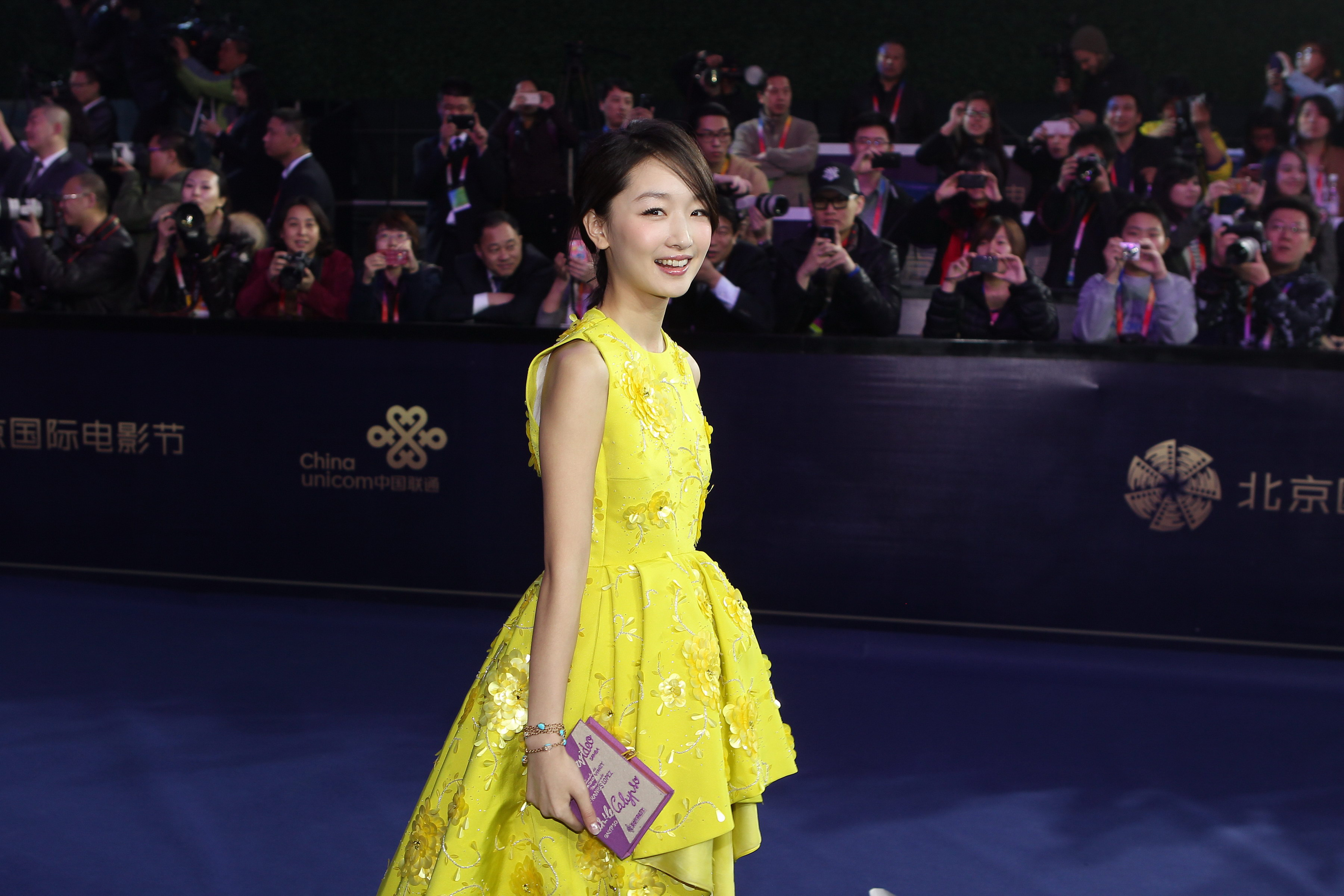
Zhou Dongyu during the closing ceremony of Beijing International Film Festival in 2013

In 2010, Zhou was picked by Zhang Yimou to star in his film Under the Hawthorn Tree, despite having no acting experience prior to taking on the role. She rose to fame for her appearance in the film and won several awards, including the Best Actress at the 56th Valladolid International Film Spain Festival, Outstanding New Actress at the 14th Huabiao Award and Best New Performer at the 20th Shanghai Film Critics Awards.

In 2011, she starred in Barbara Wong's romance film The Allure of Tears; and also featured in war film The Road Of Exploring, playing Yang Kaihui, the wife of political leader Mao Zedong.

In 2013, she starred in historical romance film The Palace, the fourth installment of the Gong series by Yu Zheng. Variety praised her performance saying, "Zhou holds the screen very well, turning an initially daft personality into an angsty but stoical heroine".

In 2014, she starred alongside Lin Gengxin in youth romance film My Old Classmate. The film topped China's box office and Zhou was praised for her "acting breakthrough". The same year, she featured in comedy Breakup Buddies. Opposite to her usual pure and fresh image, Zhou challenged the role of a "Smart" in the film. Breakup Buddies became one of the highest-grossing films of all time in China.

In 2015, she starred opposite Ethan Juan in suspense film The Unbearable Lightness of Inspector Fan and youth drama The Ark of Mr. Chow alongside Sun Honglei.

=== 2016–present: Critical acclaim ===
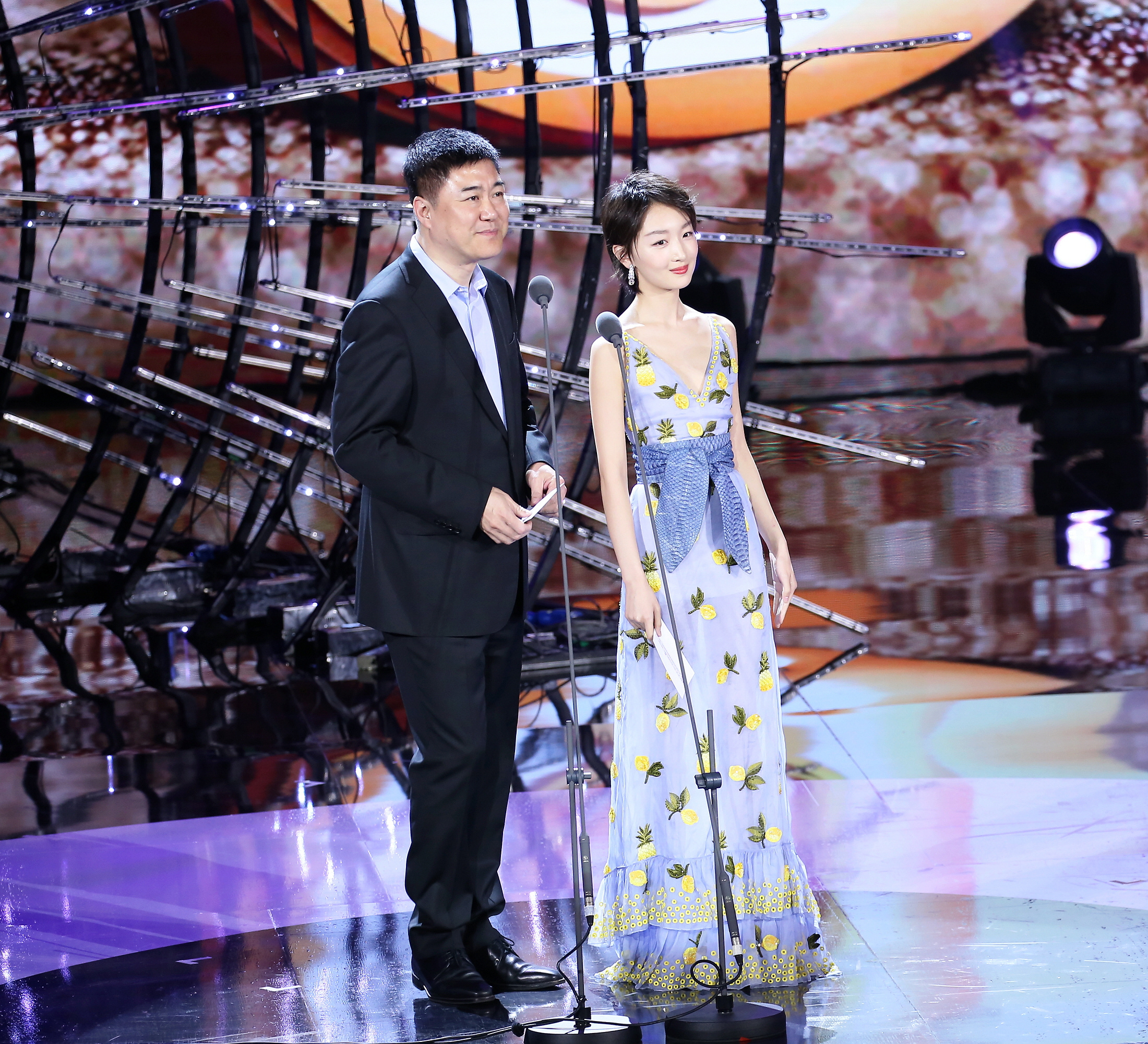
Zhou Dongyu (right) awarded the "Queen of Weibo Movie Night" in June 2017

Zhou achieved breakthrough with her performance in the film Soul Mate, based on the novel of the same name by Anni Baobei. Zhou received the Best Actress award at the 53rd Golden Horse Awards together with her Soul Mate co-star Sandra Ma, and also won Best Actress at the 28th Hong Kong Film Critics Society Award. The same year, she won the Best Actress award at the 8th Macau International Movie Festival for her performance in the South Korean-Chinese romance film Never Said Goodbye. Zhou also starred in her first television series, spy war drama Sparrow. The series was commercially successful, and became the highest rated war drama to date with a peak rating of 2.46 and 11 billion online views. Zhou was praised by both the audience and director for successfully tackling a challenging role.

In 2017, Zhou starred alongside Takeshi Kaneshiro in the romantic comedy This Is Not What I Expected. The film grossed over 100 million yuan and received an 8.9 out of 10 score on Maoyan. Along with the success of Soul Mate, Zhou was coined the representative of Chinese chick flicks. The same year, she starred in the coming-of-age romance drama Shall I Compare You to a Spring Day alongside Zhang Yishan; and featured in science fiction wuxia film The Thousand Faces of Dunjia directed by Tsui Hark. In 2018, Zhou starred in Rene Liu's romance film Us and Them alongside Jing Boran. It was a hit in China, earning $191 million over its first two weekends. In 2019, Zhou starred in the youth film Better Days helmed by Soul Mate director Derek Tsang, that tackles school bullying. The film topped box office and received positive reviews. Zhou won the Best Actress at the 39th Hong Kong Film Awards for her performance. The same year, she featured in the drama film On The Balcony which she serves as one of the co-producers. Zhou ranked seventh on Forbes China Celebrity 100 list in 2019, the highest for female celebrities. In 2021, Zhou starred alongside Xu Kai in the series Ancient Love Poetry. In 2023, Zhou starred in the film The Breaking Ice by Singaporean director Anthony Chen, which premiered at the 2023 Cannes Film Festival and competed as part of the Un Certain Regard.

== Personal life ==
Zhou was born in Shijiazhuang, Hebei. She graduated from the Beijing Film Academy.

At the 2010 Hawaii International Film Festival, she apologized in Mandarin that she spoke no English; her co-star Shawn Dou who interpreted for her. At the 2019 Cannes Film Festival, however, she spoke fluent English.

== Political views ==
In March 2021, Zhou terminated her contract with Burberry as brand ambassador after the company announced that they would discontinue cotton purchases from the Chinese autonomous region of Xinjiang amidst allegations of forced labor, human rights violations and persecution of the Uyghur ethnic minority population in China by the US State Department. Widely seen as a pro-nationalist move, her actions were replicated by other Chinese celebrities.

== Filmography ==
=== Film ===
Year	Title	Role	Notes	Ref.
2010	Under the Hawthorn Tree	Jing Qiu		
2011	The Road of Exploring	Yang Kaihui		
2011	The Allure of Tears	Geilimei	Omnibus film	
2013	The Palace	Chen Xiang		
2014	My Old Classmate	Zhou Xiaozhi		
2014	Breakup Buddies	Zhou Lijuan		
2015	The Unbearable Lightness of Inspector Fan	Hui Lan		
2015	The Ark of Mr. Chow	Zhou Lan		
2016	Everybody's Fine	Girl stopping the bus	Cameo	
2016	The New Year's Eve of Old Lee	Doa Yazi	Special appearance	
2016	Run for Love	Bai Qiezi	Segment: "Stolen Heart"	
2016	Lost in White	Zhou Xinyi		
2016	Never Said Goodbye	Gu Xiaoyou		
2016	Soul Mate	Li Ansheng		
2017	A Nail Clipper Romance	Emily		
2017	This Is Not What I Expected	Gu Shengnan		
2017	The Founding of an Army	Fan Guixia	Cameo	
2017	City of Rock	Lili	Guest appearance	
2017	The Thousand Faces of Dunjia	Xiao Yuan		
2018	Us and Them	Xiao Xiao		
2018	Animal World	Liu Qing	Special appearance	
2018	Goddesses in the Flames of War	Xiao Yu		
2018	Kung Fu Monster	Xiong Jiaojiao	Special appearance	
2019	On The Balcony	Lu Shanshan	Special appearance; also producer	
2019	My People, My Country	Nurse	Segment: "Passing by"	
2019	Better Days	Chen Nian		
2021	A Fangirl's Romance	Gao Bei	Special appearance	
2021	The Year of the Everlasting Storm	Young wife	Segment: "The Break Away"	
2021	Fire on the Plain	Li Fei		
2021	Embrace Again	Xia Xiao		
2022	Ode to the Spring	Shang Xiaoyu		
2023	Tale of the Night	Lanzhou girl	Cameo	
2023	Born to Fly	Shen Tianran		
2023	My Youth and I	Zhou Xiaoyu	Internet film	
2023	The Breaking Ice	Nana		
2023	Under the Light	Li Huilin		
2023	Tainted Love	Zhou Ran		
2023	Trending Topic	Chen Miao		
2024	Strangers When We Meet	Chang Juan		

=== Television series ===
Year	Title	Role	Notes	Ref.
2016	Sparrow	Xu Bicheng		
2017	Love & Life & Lie	Liu Xintong		
2017	Mo Du Feng Yun	Xiao Yao		
2017	Shall I Compare You to a Spring Day	Xiao Hong	Also producer	
2019	Behind The Scenes	Bu Xiaogu		
2020	New World	Jia Xiaoduo	Cameo	
2021	Ancient Love Poetry	Shang Gu / Hou Chi		

=== Variety show ===
Year	Title	Role	Notes/Ref.
2016	We Are In Love	Cast member	with Shawn Yue
2017	Chinese Restaurant	Cast member	
2018	I Actor	Mentor	
2019	The Protectors	Cast member	

== Discography ==
=== Singles ===
Year	English title	Chinese title	Album	Notes/Ref.
2016	"Little Windchime"	小风铃	Mr. Nian OST	
2016	"Imperfect Girl"	不完美女孩		Promotional song for We Are In Love
2017	"If I Love You"	如果我爱你	Shall I Compare You to a Spring Day OST	with Zhang Yishan
2018	"Strong Country Generation I Am Here"	强国一代有我在		Promotional song for CCYL
2019	"China Happy Events"	中国喜事		Performance for CCTV Spring Gala with Phoenix Legend, Wallace Chung, Dilraba Dilmurat, & Lay Zhang
2019	"My Motherland and I"	我和我的祖国		For People's Republic of China's 70th anniversary with Wei Daxun, Ma Tianyu, Guan Xiaotong, Xu Weizhou & Ju Jingyi
2019	"My Motherland and I"	我和我的祖国	My People My Country OST	with Chen Feiyu, Liu Haoran, Ou Hao & Zhu Yilong
2019	"Starry Sea"	星辰大海		For China Movie Channel Young Actors Project with 31 other actors
2020	"Hello 2020"	你好2020		Performance for CCTV Spring Gala with Li Xian, Li Qin, Ma Sichun & Zhu Yilong

== Accolades ==
=== Awards and nominations ===
Year	Awards	Category	Nominated work	Result	Ref.
2011	23rd Harbin Ice and Snow Film Festival	Most Commercially Valuable Newcomer	Under the Hawthorn Tree	Won	
2011	5th Asian Film Awards	Best Newcomer	Under the Hawthorn Tree	Nominated	
2011	20th Shanghai Film Critics Awards	Best Newcomer	Under the Hawthorn Tree	Won	
2011	14th Huabiao Awards	Outstanding New Actress	Under the Hawthorn Tree	Won	
2011	56th Valladolid International Film Festival	Best Actress	Under the Hawthorn Tree	Won	
2015	6th China Film Director's Guild Awards	Best Actress	My Old Classmate	Nominated	
2015	15th Chinese Film Media Awards	Most Anticipated Actress	My Old Classmate	Won	
2016	8th Macau International Movie Festival	Best Actress	Never Say Goodbye	Won	
2016	53rd Golden Horse Awards	Best Actress (with Ma Sichun)	Soul Mate	Won	
2017	23rd Hong Kong Film Critics Society Award	Best Actress	Soul Mate	Won	
2017	1st Malaysia International Film Festival	Best Actress	Soul Mate	Nominated	
2017	24th Beijing College Student Film Festival	Best Actress	Soul Mate	Nominated	
2017	8th China Film Director's Guild Awards	Best Actress	Soul Mate	Nominated	
2017	2nd Brics Film Festival	Best Actress	Soul Mate	Won	
2017	17th Chinese Film Media Awards	Best Actress	Soul Mate	Won	
2017	2nd Golden Screen Awards	Best Actress	Soul Mate	Won	
2017	36th Hong Kong Film Awards	Best Actress	Soul Mate	Nominated	
2017	31st Golden Rooster Awards	Best Actress	Soul Mate	Nominated	
2017	22nd Huading Awards	Best Actress (Revolutionary-Era Drama)	Sparrow	Nominated	
2017	8th Macau International Television Festival	Best Actress	Shall I Compare You to a Spring Day	Nominated	
2017	14th Guangzhou Student Film Festival	Most Popular Actress	This Is Not What I Expected	Won	
2018	12th Asian Film Awards	Best Actress	This Is Not What I Expected	Nominated	
2018	9th China Film Director's Guild Awards	Best Actress	This Is Not What I Expected	Won	
2018	34th Hundred Flowers Awards	Best Actress	Soul Mate	Nominated	
2018	18th Chinese Film Media Awards	Most Popular Actress	Us and Them	Won	
2018	12th Tencent Video Star Awards	Most Popular Film Actress	Us and Them	Won	
2019	10th China Film Director's Guild Awards	Best Actress	Us and Them	Nominated	
2019	32nd Golden Rooster Awards	Best Actress	Us and Them	Nominated	
2019	6th The Actors of China Award Ceremony	Best Actress (Emerald Category)	Behind The Scenes	Nominated	
2019	Golden Bud - The Fourth Network Film And Television Festival	Best Actress	Behind The Scenes	Nominated	
2019	Cosmo Glam Night	Person of The Year (Dream)	—N/a	Won	
2019	4th Macao Film Festival Awards	Best Actress	Better Days	Won	
2019	Tencent Entertainment White Paper	Film Actress of the Year	Better Days	Won	
2019	Jinri Toutiao Awards Ceremony	Brand Value Star of the Year	—N/a	Won	
2020	Weibo Awards Ceremony	Influential Actor of the Year	—N/a	Won	
2020	26th Hong Kong Film Critics Society Awards	Best Actress	Better Days	Nominated	
2020	31st Hong Kong Film Directors' Guild Awards	Best Actress	Better Days	Won	
2020	39th Hong Kong Film Awards	Best Actress	Better Days	Won	
2020	11th China Film Director's Guild Awards	Actress of the Year	Better Days	Won	
2020	27th Huading Awards	Best Actress	Better Days	Nominated	
2020	35th Hundred Flowers Awards	Best Actress	Better Days	Won	
2020	14th Asian Film Awards	Best Actress	Better Days	Won	
2020	33rd Golden Rooster Awards	Best Actress	Better Days	Won	

=== Forbes China Celebrity 100 ===
Year	Rank	Ref.
2017	71st	
2019	7th	
2020	3rd	

=== Honours ===
- Jury member at the 2024 Busan International Film Festival for its main competition section 'New Currents Award'.
