= The Ark of Mr. Chow =

- Poster
- 少年班
- Directed by: Xiao Yang
- Screenplay by: Zhang Ji; Xiao Yang
- Produced by: Chen Kuo-fu; Wang Zhonglei; Tao Kun; Chang Hongsong
- Starring: Sun Honglei; Zhou Dongyu; Dong Zijian; Wang Yuexin; Zhao Lixin; Liu Xilong; Leo Li; Wilson Wang; CiCi Xia
- Cinematography: Li Ran
- Edited by: Zhang Weili
- Music by: Mizutani Hiromi
- Production company: CKF Pictures
- Release date: 19 June 2015
- Running time: 104 minutes
- Country: China
- Language: Mandarin
- Box office: CN¥50.6 million

The Ark of Mr. Chow (Chinese: 少年班) is a 2015 Chinese period youth drama film directed by Xiao Yang. It was released on 19 June 2015.

== Cast ==
- Sun Honglei as Zhou Zhiyong
- Zhou Dongyu as Zhou Lan
- Dong Zijian as Wu Wei
- Wang Yuexin as Mai Ke
- Zhao Lixin as Liang
- Liu Xilong as Wang Dafa
- Leo Li as Fang Houzheng
- Wilson Wang as Qin Hai
- CiCi Xia as Jiang Yilin

== Reception ==
=== Box office ===
The film earned CN¥50.648 million at the Chinese box office.

=== Critical response ===
Derek Elley of Film Business Asia gave the film a 7 out of 10, calling it "entertaining but under-developed".
