= Looking for Jackie =

- Directed by: Fang Gangliang; Jiang Ping
- Written by: Hua Xuan; Wu Jiamin
- Produced by: Han Xiaoli; Jia Qi; Ma Weigan; Peggy Cheung; Jiang Tao; Chen Lianbao; Li Peisen
- Starring: Jackie Chan; Zhang Yishan
- Cinematography: Long Shensong
- Edited by: Lee Kwong Tim
- Production companies: Beijing Film; Children's Film Studio
- Distributed by: China Film Group Corporation
- Release date: 3 July 2009
- Country: China
- Language: Mandarin

Looking for Jackie (simplified Chinese: 寻找成龙; traditional Chinese: 尋找成龍; pinyin: Xúnzhǎo Chéng Lóng; Jyutping: Cam1 Zaau1 Sing4 Lung4; also known as Jackie Chan: Kung Fu Master) is a 2009 family film directed by Jiang Ping and Fang Gangliang. It tells the story of a young boy, Zhang Yishan (Zhang Yishan), who sets on a journey to meet his idol, Jackie Chan. The film features many cameos by guests stars such as Yu Nan, Zhang Yibai, and Yuen Chau.

== Plot ==
Zhang Yishan (Zhang Yishan) is a 16-year-old boy living in Indonesia with his grandmother. After being bullied and seeing Jackie Chan's arrival in China, Beijing, he agrees to go there so he can meet his idol and become his disciple. After arriving in Beijing he goes to the wrong place due to his little knowledge of Chinese. He stays in a temple and befriends a girl living there with her aunt. After learning that she works in films with an actor who knows Jackie, he asks her to question him about Jackie's whereabouts. But she forgets and he leaves to search for his idol.

He arrives at a station where his wallet is stolen, and he is kidnapped by the thugs who stole his wallet. The thugs contact his grandparents to ask for a ransom, and his grandparents contact the police. The police go undercover and almost catches the thugs, but they escape. Meanwhile, Zhang Yishan is released by a woman who sees him as her little brother who died. After escaping and telling police about the thugs, they are captured, and the police officer takes him to her house for the night. After arguing about Jackie being better than the officer, he gets beaten and falls asleep. In the morning, the officer leaves to capture the escaped leader of the thugs. Zhang goes to see Jackie but instead sees the gang leader who is being chased by the officer. After a little fight he is captured and the officer is wounded badly. Zhang takes her to the hospital where she is saved, and Zhang is returned to his grandparents.

After arguing with his grandmother, he goes to a film studio where he is cast as an extra and soon thrown out. Meanwhile, his grandmother asks Jackie to meet her grandson, to which he agrees. Zhang is brought to the studio by Jackie where Zhang sees Jackie fight and after a little chat, he is returned home by Jackie and he tells Zhang to study hard.

At the end, Zhang passes his exam and is respected by other students. He calls Jackie to tell him about his result but no one replies. Everyone begins to doubt him whether he met Jackie or not but after a few moments a picture is received by Zhang which was promised by Jackie that if he would pass his exam Jackie would send him the picture.

== Cast ==
- Zhang Yishan as Zhang Yishan (A young student named after himself)
- Jackie Chan as himself (guest star)
- Tian Hua as grandmother
- Zhang Yongshou as grandfather
- Zhou Xiaobin as gatekeeper
- Jiang Yihong as police officer
- Qin Lan as nurse
- Yu Nan as director
- Yuen Wah (cameo)
- Yuen Qiu (cameo)
- Ariel Aisin-Gioro as The conductor (cameo)

== Reception ==
In 2009, Derek Elley of Variety called it "an amiable family pic" that is "part Jackie Chan promo, part China studio tour". Noting that it is "cameo-packed", he reflects that "Most of the fun is had by the droves of guest stars", but that the "slapdash plot" makes it "vid fodder beyond a few select Asian markets".
