= My Dearest Self with Malice Aforethought =

Japanese manga series

- Cover of the first volume

親愛なる僕へ殺意をこめて (Shinainaru Boku e Satsui o Komete)
- Genre: Drama; Suspense
- Manga
- Written by: Hajime Inoryu
- Illustrated by: Shota Ito
- Published by: Kodansha
- English publisher: NA: Kodansha USA
- Magazine: Weekly Young Magazine; Comic Days
- Original run: May 7, 2018 – September 7, 2020
- Volumes: 11
- Television drama
- Directed by: Hiroaki Matsuyama (chief)
- Produced by: Daisuke Kusagaya
- Written by: Michitaka Okuda
- Studio: Fuji Television
- Original network: FNS (Fuji TV)
- Original run: October 5, 2022 – November 30, 2022
- Episodes: 9

My Dearest Self with Malice Aforethought (Japanese: 親愛なる僕へ殺意をこめて, Hepburn: Shinainaru Boku e Satsui o Komete) is a Japanese manga series written by Hajime Inoryu and illustrated by Shota Ito. It was serialized in Kodansha's Weekly Young Magazine from May 2018 to August 2019, when it moved to the Comic Days manga website, where the series finished its serialization in September 2020. The series' individual chapters were collected into eleven volumes. A television drama adaptation aired on Fuji TV from October to November 2022.

== Synopsis ==
Eiji Urashima is a college student with a dark past. As a child, his entire life was turned upside down when the world found out that his father, Hanoi Makoto, was actually a heinous serial killer named LL who kidnapped and brutalized young women. One day, Eiji wakes up with no memory of the past few days, finding himself with a new girlfriend, newfound respect from the college bully, a mysterious bag of cash, and a bloodied, broken bat secretly stashed away in his room. At the same time, there is news of a murder committed similar to the LL Serial Killings. Eiji must uncover what has happened in the days he has no memory about as the sins of his father start haunting him again.

== Media ==
=== Manga ===
Written by Hajime Inoryu and illustrated by Shota Ito, the series began serialization in Weekly Young Magazine on May 7, 2018. In August 2019, the series moved to the Comic Days manga website, where it completed its serialization on September 7, 2020. Kodansha collected the series' individual chapters into eleven volumes.

In November 2020, Kodansha USA announced that they licensed the series for English publication.

==== Volume list ====
No.	Original release date	Original ISBN	English release date	English ISBN
1	September 6, 2018	978-4-06-512807-7	February 2, 2021	978-1-64-659896-0
2	December 6, 2018	978-4-06-513845-8	March 2, 2021	978-1-64-659993-6
3	February 6, 2019	978-4-06-514558-6	April 6, 2021	978-1-63-699041-5
4	May 7, 2019	978-4-06-515468-7	May 4, 2021	978-1-63-699089-7
5	August 6, 2019	978-4-06-516729-8	June 1, 2021	978-1-63-699139-9
6	October 4, 2019	978-4-06-517293-3	July 6, 2021	978-1-63-699208-2
7	January 8, 2020	978-4-06-518219-2	August 3, 2021	978-1-63-699285-3
8	March 11, 2020	978-4-06-518838-5	September 7, 2021	978-1-63-699339-3
9	June 10, 2020	978-4-06-519990-9	October 5, 2021	978-1-63-699397-3
10	September 9, 2020	978-4-06-520687-4	November 2, 2021	978-1-63-699453-6
11	November 11, 2020	978-4-06-521378-0	December 7, 2021	978-1-63-699506-9

=== TV drama ===
A television drama adaptation was announced on June 26, 2022. Directed by Hiroaki Matsuyama, with Michitaka Okuda writing the scripts and Daisuke Kusagaya producing, Ryosuke Yamada performed the lead. It aired on Fuji TV from October 5, 2022, to November 30, 2022.

== Reception ==
The columnists for Manga News praised the story, artwork, and characters. Faustine Lillaz from Planete BD praised the suspense elements in the story and the artwork. Christel Scheja from Splash Comics also praised the story, calling it unique.

The series has 1.2 million copies in circulation.

== See also ==
- Lonely Deaths Lie Thick as Snow, another manga series by the same creators
