= Under the Hawthorn Tree (film) =

2010 Chinese-Hong Kong film by Zhang Yimou

- Film poster
- Directed by: Zhang Yimou
- Written by: Yin Lichuan; Gu Xiaobai
- Based on: Hawthorn Tree Forever by Ai Mi
- Produced by: Zhang Weiping; Cao Yuayi; Hugo Shong; Bill Kong
- Starring: Zhou Dongyu; Shawn Dou
- Cinematography: Zhao Xiaoding
- Edited by: Meng Peicong
- Music by: Qigang Chen
- Distributed by: Edko Films Ltd.
- Release date: 15 September 2010 (China)
- Running time: 114 minutes
- Countries: China; Hong Kong
- Language: Mandarin
- Box office: ¥148 million (China)

Under the Hawthorn Tree (simplified Chinese: 山楂树之恋; traditional Chinese: 山楂樹之戀; pinyin: Shānzhāshù Zhī Liàn) is 2010 film directed by Zhang Yimou. A Chinese-Hong Kong co-production, it was adapted from the popular 2007 novel Hawthorn Tree Forever by Ai Mi, which was based on a true story set during the Cultural Revolution. The film was released in Mainland China (September 2010), Hong Kong (November 2010) and Singapore (February 2011).

== Plot ==
Set during the end of China's Cultural Revolution in a small village in Yichang City, Hubei Province, China, this film is about a pure love that develops between a beautiful high school student, Zhang Jing Qiu, and a handsome young prospector named Lao San (which means the third child in a family). Jing Qiu is one of the educated youth sent to be re-educated through work in the countryside under a directive from Chairman Mao Zedong.

She arrives with a group in Xiping village, in the Yangtze River's Three Gorges region, where they are shown a hawthorn tree called the Tree of Heroes which was reputedly nourished by the blood of Chinese martyrs executed by the Japanese during World War II. Jing Qiu is lodged with the family of village head, where she meets geology student Sun Jianxin (nicknamed Lao San), who also takes his meals at Zhang's home, and she's drawn to his responsible and honorable character.

Lao San's father held a high position in the military, but his mother committed suicide four years ago after being branded as a "rightist". Jing Qiu's father was also a political prisoner somewhere in China and her mother, branded as a "capitalist", was reduced to menial work to support their family. Following the political persecution of her father, Jing Qiu lived with her mother and little siblings, working towards becoming a teacher to support her family.

Despite the fact that this could endanger the future of Jing Qiu and her family, Jing Qiu and Lao San fell in love and their relationship continues the following year. Lao San also promised to wait for her until she grew up. Jing Qiu was torn between her feelings for Lao San and her filial duty to her family.

However, Lao San later developed leukemia and forced himself to leave Jing Qiu. Jing Qiu, without knowing about Lao San's deadly disease, was only reunited with him when he was dying in hospital. The film closed with Jing Qiu tearfully calling to the unconscious Lao San, repeatedly saying "I am Jing Qiu, I am Jing Qiu."

== Cast ==
- Zhou Dongyu as Jing Qiu
- Shawn Dou as Lao San (Jianxin)
- Xi Meijuan as Jing Qiu's mother
- Jiang Ruijia as Wei Hong, Jing Qiu's friend
- Lü Liping as Wei Hong's mother
- Chen Xingxu as Lao San's brother
- Sun Haiying as Lao San's father

== Production ==
=== History ===
This film is based on the novel Hawthorn Tree Forever which was written by author Aimi and it was inspired by the real-life story of her friend, Jing. Zhang Yimou decided to bring the story to the big screen after being moved by the novel.

=== Release ===
The film debuted in the 15th Busan International Film Festival on 7 October 2010. It was then released in Mainland China on 15 September 2010 and in Hong Kong on 11 November 2010. It was also released on 10 February 2011 in Singapore cinemas.

== Reception ==
=== Critical reception ===
My Paper said that "Dou and Zhou bring a touching believability to this tale of young love" and rated this film 3.5 stars. Pusan International Film Festival website stated that "He renders it as something now tainted under the weight of age and ever-changing worlds. In an unbelievably delicate observance... Zhang expresses his view of innocence in a soft, almost feminine, approach. Also ... he successfully draws enticing portrayals of innocence from Zhou Dongyu and Dou Xiao. ... Zhang Yimou appears to reclaim his own innocence as a youthful creator. " Kaori Shoji of The Japan Times gave the film 4 out of 5 stars, and describes it as a "tearjerker aims for the heart".

=== Box office ===
The film grossed ¥148 million in China.

=== Awards and nominations ===
Film Festival	Date of ceremony	Category	Participants/Recipients	Result
15th Busan International Film Festival	7–15 October 2010	Opening Film (International Premiere)	Under the Hawthorn Tree	Participant
30th Hawaii International Film Festival	14–24 October 2010	Opening Night Film	Under the Hawthorn Tree	Participant
7th Hong Kong Asian Film Festival	8 November 2010	Closing Film	Under the Hawthorn Tree	Participant
61st Berlin International Film Festival	10–20 February 2011	New Generation	Under the Hawthorn Tree	Participant
5th Asian Film Awards	21 March 2011	Best Newcomer	Zhou Dongyu	Nominated
5th Asian Film Awards	21 March 2011	Best Editing	Meng Peicong	Nominated
16th International Film Festival of Kerala	9–16 December 2011	Opening Film	Under the Hawthorn Tree	Participant
