= TFBoys =

Chinese idol group

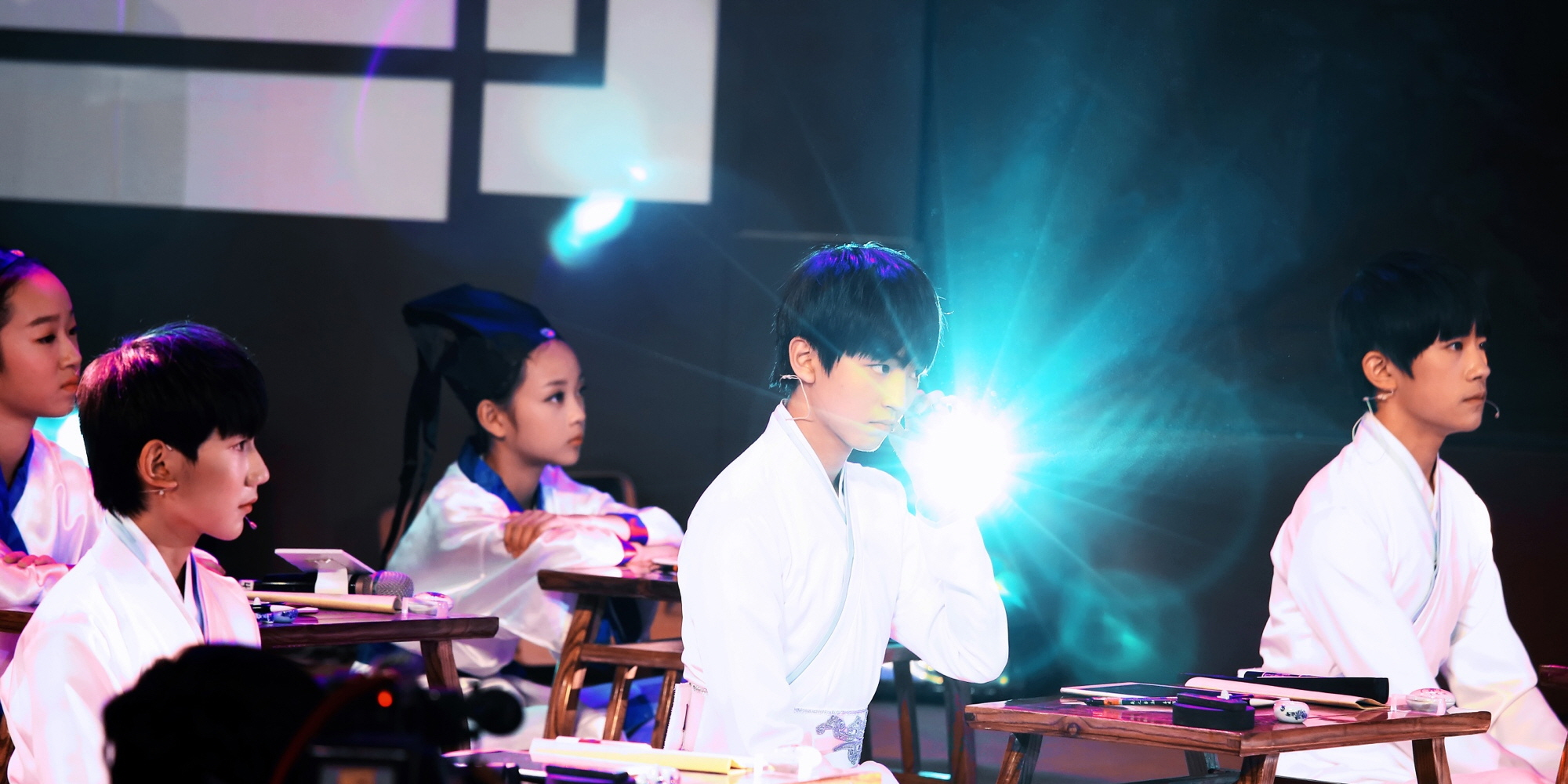
- TFBoys in 2015

Background information
- Origin: Beijing, China
- Genre: Mandopop
- Years active: 2013–present
- Label: Time Fengjun Entertainment
- Members: Karry Wang; Roy Wang; Jackson Yee

TFBoys (Chinese: 加油男孩, 加油少年; pinyin: Jiā Yóu Shào Nián), also known as The Fighting Boys, is a Chinese boy group launched by Time Fengjun Entertainment, consisting of three members, Karry Wang, Roy Wang, and Jackson Yee. The group debuted on August 6, 2013, with their album Heart Dream·Start. In 2017, they each established individual studios and have largely pursued solo careers since. On August 6, 2023, they held their ten-year anniversary concert in Xi'an.

One of China's most successful boy groups, TFBoys is regarded as the first generation of TF Family, the collective name for all male trainees and boy groups under Time Fengjun.

== Career ==
=== 2013–2014: Formation and debut ===
TFBoys first appeared on August 6, 2013, with a promotional video sent out by Time Fengjun Entertainment called "Ten Years". On October 4, they held a showcase of their debut EP at the Sun Moonlight (SML) Center in Yuzhong District, Chongqing. They debuted on October 18, 2013, with the release of a single album "Start to Heart", including the title track "Heart".

The group subsequently released a series of hits in 2014, including "Magic Castle", "For Dreams, Always Be Ready" and "Manual of Youth". Their album "Manual of Youth" went on to chart at number 1 on YinYueTai V Charts for 5 consecutive weeks and has won multiple music awards.

On August 3, 2014, TFBoys held a fan appreciation meeting for their first anniversary at the Beijing Hualian Changying Shopping Center. After the event, Li Xiaolin, chairperson of International Cooperation Department of China Population Welfare Foundation, and her party issued a letter for TFBoys that enstated them as ambassadors for the charity "Happy Smiles". With their ambassadorship, TFBoys raised numerous donations for children that suffer from cleft lip and palate through their large social media platform, drawing topic interactions that exceeded 800 million. At the time of their first anniversary, their fundraising raised more than 370,000 yuan, with a total of nearly 40,000 netizens participating in the donation drive. The donations helped more than 100 children with cleft lip.

=== 2015–2016: Mainstream popularity, international success and contributions ===
On January 14, 2015, TFBoys attended the "2014 Weibo Night" ceremony and won the top charity contribution award for their previous year of charities. On September 16, they sang a promotional single "Love With You" for the "2015 MusicRadio我要上学 (I want to go to school)" charity project. The project was aimed at underserved children in poverty stricken areas who dream of attending school.

On September 23, they participated in the 2015 Bazzar Star Charity Night and helped raise 4.17 million yuan in funds for the "为爱加速 (I love to Progress)" charity in the Siyuan Basha poverty-stricken county. In November, TFBoys became a public interest spokesperson for the Chongqing Public Security Fire Department. Later on in the year, they attended the "QQ Red Scarf Project" public welfare conference jointly sponsored by Tencent QQ, QQ Space, China Poverty Alleviation Fund and Tencent Public Welfare to customize winter warm clothes for young people in remote and poverty-stricken areas.

TFBoys held their 2nd anniversary fan meeting to a sold-out show at the Master Card Center in Beijing on August 15 entitled "出道兩週年紀念 《TFBoys Fan's Time》." The event was two and a half hours and they sung their best hits including "Manual of Youth" and "Heart". In September, Jackson Yee appeared on his first solo live broadcast for the video app "美拍 (Beauty Shot)." The number of people that watched live totaled 8.128 million, more than 863 million likes, and had more than 8.529 million comments. He broke the previous record set by his group back in June.

In December, the group released their first EP The Big Dreamer. On the album includes the song "Adore" (宠爱), with the lyrics conveying the thoughts and feelings of the boys entering puberty (14–15 years old). Lyrics like "I want to share happy things with you," "This is my first time to be nervous around someone" and "Is this love? I still don't understand yet" expressed the inner emotions of young people. "Adore" was Song of the Year at the ERC Chinese Top Ten Awards (第23届东方风云榜), with the award show honoring the top 10 biggest hits in mainland China. The EP peaked at number 1 on the Billboard China V chart for 6 weeks.

In 2016, they won Top Group at The 4th V Chart Awards. The group also starred in their own web drama Finding Soul.

=== 2017–present: Individual activities and "Our Time" ===
In 2017, the group starred in their own drama Boy Hood, an inspirational youth drama focused on baseball. The main OST for Boyhood "Go! Amigo" hit number 1 Billboard China V Chart for 4 weeks in a row. They also won Top Group of the Year at the 5th V Chart Awards for a second consecutive time.

On August 11 and 13, TFBoys held their 4th anniversary concert titled 'Alive Four' in Nanjing. On the 13th, they posted on Weibo that they would be donating 100 million yuan to the victims and rescue efforts of the 2017 Jiuzhaigou earthquake. The earthquake was a 7.0 magnitude and killed more than 25 people. That same year, the group announced that the members will set up their own personal studios to focus on their own individual activities.

Roy Wang's endorsements have been notable for international appeal. They include Paris L'Oreal brand ambassador, H&M China new generation image spokesperson, Oreo brand ambassador, HP Star series spokesperson, Chopard brand ambassador, FILA brand spokesperson, Xiaomi smartphone endorser, and Line Friends global chief creative officer. In March and April 2018, Wang's fans' purchases exceeded 13.93 million yuan alone. In October last year, the "TFBoys Business Value Insight", produced by the First Financial and Economic Data Center, wrote: "The price level of the consumer group of Roy Wang influence radiation is the highest among the TFBoys..."

In 2018, TFBoys released a book titled "2023: Non-Fiction Growth Story" for their 5th anniversary to showcase the struggles and successes as a group. On August 2, TFBoys attended the unveiling of their wax figures at Madame Tussauds Shanghai.

On August 5, 2023, the group released new single titled "See You Tomorrow". On August 5, the group held their 10th Anniversary concert titled "Ten-year engagement (十年之约)" in Xi'an, China, driving Xi 'an tourism GDP up to 460 million.

== Artistry ==
The group's musical style is mainly dance-style music with rap elements, often classified as "bubblegum pop". Their songs have been noted for having uplifting and positive lyrics, which explores the trials of growing up and teenage love, such as "Manual of Youth" and "Imperfect Kid".

== Impact ==
TFBoys is considered to be one of the most popular Chinese boy bands and is seen as a Chinese pop-culture sensation. Since their debut in 2013, they have won many major music awards and earned more than 200 million Weibo followers combined. Their sales of band merchandise average more than $17 million per month. Their success was attributed to their fresh school-boy looks, which filled the void of young male idol groups in China; as well as their "wholesome and boy-next-door" image. Due to their image, the group has won a large number of "mother fans", women in their mid–20s to 60s who have developed maternal instincts for the boys.

=== Politics ===
The Chinese government has shown support for the boy band group, which has been featured for four consecutive years (2016–2019) on the CCTV New Year's Gala. The Communist Youth League's official Weibo account often promotes the group's activities. On International Children's Day in 2015, the Communist Youth League released a video featuring TFBoys singing "We Are the Heirs of Communism", the song of the Young Pioneers. They were selected as a brand ambassador of China's 2020 Chinese Mars Mission. The band is part of the government's efforts to promote its policies among China's youth. Critic Zhu Dake sees the boy band as serving to provide modernized propaganda.

== Members ==
- Junkai Wang (王俊凯)
- Roy Wang (王源)
- Jackson Yee (易烊千玺)

== Discography ==
Extended plays

- Big Dreamer (2015)

== Filmography ==
=== Feature films ===
Year	English title	Chinese title	Notes
2015	Pound of Flesh	致命追击	Cameo
2015	Mr. Six	老炮儿	Cameo
2019	L.O.R.D: Legend of Ravaging Dynasties 2	爵跡2：冷血狂宴	Supporting roles

=== Television dramas ===
Year	English title	Chinese title	Notes
2016	Noble Aspirations	青云志	Cameo
2016	Love for Separation	小别离	Cameo
2017	Boyhood	我们的少年时代	Leading roles
2018	Eagles and Youngster		

=== Web dramas ===
Year	English title	Chinese title	Notes
2016	Finding Soul	超少年密码	Leading roles

=== Reality shows ===
Year	Title	Notes
2013–2014	TF Teens Go (Season 1)	with trainees of Time Fengjun Entertainment
2014	TFBoys Idols Diary	11 episodes
2014	TF Teens Go (Season 2)	with trainees of Time Fengjun Entertainment
2015	Hurry Up, Brother	Roy Wang appeared in one episode. This is a popular reality show where celebrities compete in missions and races.
2015	TFBoys Observational Diary	18 episodes
2015	Hurry Up！（《全员加速中》）	Karry Wang (Wang Junkai), Roy Wang, and Jackson Yee (Yi Yangqianxi) participated in this adventure reality show, where celebrities complete tasks
2015–2016	Run for Time	Cast member
2016	Ace vs Ace	TFBOYS members competed in this variety show on Zhejiang TV, where two teams of celebrities face off in games and performances.

== Awards ==
V Chart Awards

Year	Category	Nominee	Results	Ref.
2014	Favorite Artist (Mainland China)	TFBoys	Won	
2014	Live Popular Singer	TFBoys	Won	
2015	Live Popular Singer	TFBoys	Won	
2015	Favorite Artist (Mainland China)	TFBoys	Won	
2015	Hot Trend Artist of the Year	TFBoys	Won	
2016	Top Group (Mainland China)	TFBoys	Won	
2017	Top Group (Mainland China)	TFBoys	Won	

ERC Chinese Top Ten Awards

Year	Category	Nominee	Results	Ref.
2015	Top 10 Songs of the Year	"Manual of Youth"	Won	
2015	Best Group	TFBoys	Won	
2015	Hot Trend Group of the Year	TFBoys	Won	
2018	Top 10 Songs of the Year	"Firefly"	Won	
2018	National Choice Group	TFBoys	Won	

Top Chinese Music Awards

Year	Category	Nominee	Results	Ref.
2015	Most Popular Song	"Manual of Youth"	Won	
2015	Most Popular Group	TFBoys	Won	
2015	Most Popular Group (Mainland China)	TFBoys	Won	

QQ Music Awards

Year	Category	Nominee	Results	Ref.
2015	Most Popular Mandarin Group	TFBoys	Won	
2015	Best New Group	TFBoys	Won	
2015	Social Networking Kings	"Pamper"	Won	
2016	Most Popular Mandarin Group	TFBoys	Won	

CSC Music Awards

Year	Category	Nominee	Results	Ref.
2016	Most Popular Group	TFBoys	Won	
2016	Top 20 Songs	"Big Dreamer"	Won	

Freshasia Music Award

Year	Category	Nominee	Results	Ref.
2016	Best Group	TFBoys	Won	
2016	Recommended Music Video of the Year	"The Rest of Our Summer"	Won	
2017	Best Group	TFBoys	Won	

iQiyi All-Star Carnival

Year	Category	Nominee	Results	Ref.
2014	Song of the Year	"Manual of Youth"	Won	
2014	Most Popular Group	TFBoys	Won	

Weibo Night Awards

Year	Category	Nominee	Results	Ref.
2015	Charity Contribution Award	TFBoys	Won	
2017	Weibo King	TFBoys	Won	
2018	Weibo Positive Influence Idol	TFBoys	Won	
2018	Outstanding Public Figure of the Year	TFBoys	Won	
2019	Weibo Most Influential Group	TFBoys	Won	

Mobile Video Festival

Year	Category	Nominee	Results	Ref.
2016	Hot Trend Idol of the Year	TFBoys	Won	
