= Us and Them (film) =

- Theatrical release poster
- Traditional Chinese: 後來的我們
- Simplified Chinese: 后来的我们
- Literal meaning: Who We Will Be
- Hanyu Pinyin: Hòulái de Wǒmen
- Directed by: Rene Liu
- Produced by: Zhang Yibai
- Starring: Jing Boran; Zhou Dongyu; Tian Zhuangzhuang
- Cinematography: Mark Lee Ping-bing
- Distributed by: Tianjin Maoyan Culture Media (Mainland China); Netflix (International); Deltamac (Hong Kong, Macau and Taiwan)
- Release dates: April 28, 2018 (Mainland China); June 22, 2018 (International); August 2, 2018 (Hong Kong)
- Country: China
- Language: Mandarin
- Box office: $209 million

Us and Them (Chinese: 后来的我们; pinyin: hòu lái de wǒ men; lit. 'The Future Us') is a 2018 Chinese romantic drama film directed by Taiwanese singer-actress Rene Liu in her directorial debut and produced by Zhang Yibai. The film stars Jing Boran and Zhou Dongyu, and was released on April 28, 2018. The film explores the relationship between a man and a woman who share the same rural hometown and try to find personal and professional fulfillments together in Beijing in the face of economic, social, familial, and romantic adversity.

== Plot ==
The story is told between the past and the present, the "us" and the "them". The scenes in the past are presented in color while scenes in the present are in black and white.

During the Chunyun period, two strangers, Lin Jianqing and Fang Xiaoxiao, meet on the train while traveling home. They become friends and find out that they are both living in Beijing, trying to find success. Jianqing wants to become a game-maker but has to deal with financial issues as well as lack of time. Xiaoxiao lives with her boyfriend in Beijing, but she leaves him due to an issue with his mother. Xiaoxiao then moves into Jianqing's tiny room in a complex. Two of them make money selling computer softwares and Japanese porns.

In the present day, Jianqing coincidentally encounters Xiaoxiao during a Chunyun flight. They room together for the night due to a flight delay and reminisce about their relationship. The story then goes back to the past. During Chinese New Year, Jianqing and Xiaoxiao get drunk and have sex, thus beginning their relationship. At the onset, things were good as they both got new jobs. At the next New Years party, Jianqing spends a lot of money to impress his friends back home. Two of them return home during the Chunyun period, and spend time with Jianqing's father. Jianqing's father tells him that he doesn't need to act rich to his friends if he is not.

One day, the manager evicts the couple from the complex. While at work, Jianqing picks a fight with a caller and gets beaten up. The couple begins to disconnect as Jianqing becomes increasingly angry and distant, picking fights with strangers and arguing with his father. Xiaoxiao breaks up with Jianqing while he was gaming. When Jianqing notices Xiaoxiao's absence, he runs out and finds her on a subway train. They stand in silence as the train departs. He becomes determined to work and finishes his game, which becomes a big hit and lands him a job. Xiaoxiao sees Jianqing on the news where he talks about the inspiration of the game's story and how it ties back to her.

That year, during the Chunyun festival, Jianqing asks Xiaoxiao if she will go together with him to their hometown, which she does. Jianqing's father informs them that he is slowly becoming blind. He refuses to move to Beijing when Jianqing berates the family restaurant and tells him to move to Beijing so that Jianqing can take care of him. Jianqing leaves, with Xiaoxiao following him. On the street, Jianqing asks Xiaoxiao to give him a second chance now that he's successful. Xiaoxiao tells Jianqing that she didn't stay with him because she hoped he would get rich and buy her a house, but because she liked him. She tells him that he doesn't understand her and never has, and then leaves.

The story then returns to the present. It is revealed that Xiaoxiao is single whereas Jianqing is married with a child. The two tearfully ask each other if the young love they had years ago was real, and Xiaoxiao admits that she really loved him. She tells him that maybe they were destined to meet on the train home, and maybe they were also destined to not be together.

Jianqing drives Xiaoxiao home. They hug and formally say their goodbyes. Jianqing tells Xiaoxiao that she will find true love again one day.

While returning home with his wife, Jianqing's father mistakenly calls her Xiaoxiao, to which Jianqing tries to not react. It is later revealed that Jianqing's father was already blind and thought his son had married Xiaoxiao, but quickly realized it wasn't her. He writes Xiaoxiao a final letter, telling her that he wishes she would have ended up with his son, but life doesn't go according to plan. He called Jianqing's wife Xiaoxiao because he wanted Jianqing to marry her so badly.

After Jianqing's father died, Jianqing goes to the restaurant and reminisces.

At the end, Xiaoxiao plays through the Jianqing's game, finding the hidden messages for her at the end. Color returns to the present timeline as they reconcile with the past.

== Cast ==
- Jing Boran as Lin Jianqing
- Zhou Dongyu as Xiaoxiao Fang
- Tian Zhuangzhuang as Jianqing's father
- Qu Zheming

== Production ==
The script was created by Zhang Biyai based on a short story Home for Chinese New Year. Jing Boran claims to have first read the script "by accident and immediately fell in love with it. Then I met René and we talked about my views on the script and my ideas. We found that we agreed with each other, and therefore I decided to take up the role."

The film was shot in Hailar, one of China's coldest places, in winter 2017. Liu remarked that shooting scenes in minus 40 degrees Celsius weather was painfully cold.

Taihai Publishing released a 288-page book by the director and her thoughts throughout the production, including on-set photography.

== Music ==
Cantopop singer Eason Chan sang the theme song for the film. The song was composed by George Chen and written by David Ke, and the music video was directed by Shen Xiaowei. The music video was released on April 10, 2018, receiving 2 million views in just two hours.

== Release ==
The film premiered on April 23, 2018 in Beijing.

At the 2018 Cannes Film Festival, Netflix bought exclusive distribution rights to the film everywhere outside of China. The film was released on the service on June 22, 2018. Liu remarked, "I am honored that the film was chosen as Netflix’s first Chinese language original film."

== Reception ==
=== Box office ===
Us and Them was a hit in China, earning $191 million over its first two weekends. There was controversy over its $88.8 million May Day weekend opening, and whether ticket sales were inflated through refundable tickets with a rival studio suing over the allegations. Maoyuan, the online ticket sales platform accused of malpractice, attributed the abnormal refunds to high-demand for pre-sale tickets and scalpers. The success of the movie made Liu the first female Chinese filmmaker with a film earning over one billion yuan.

=== Critical response ===
On Rotten Tomatoes the film has an approval rating of 100% based on reviews from six critics.

It holds a score of 5.9/10 based on 224453 user ratings on Chinese-language Douban and 6.3 on Chinese-language Mtime. Eddie Strait of the Daily Dot remarked that, "[Liu] is a generous storyteller, unafraid to let her characters make mistakes but never vilifying them.". Joe Reid of Decider.com described it as "a simple but beautifully filmed love story that touches upon the economic realities of the world [...]" John Berra of Screen Daily commented on how, "Liu deftly handles the peaks and troughs of young love, eliciting winning performances from Jing and Zhou." Bhaskar Chattopadhyay of First Post highlighted the parental dynamic between Jianqing's father and Xiaoxiao: "It is the sort of writing, the kind of performance that one hopes to see in a film, and it literally saves the film from being just another love story, elevating it to a whole new level altogether." On October 19, 2018, Vulture ranked it as #43 in its list of Every Netflix Original Movie, Ranked.

== Accolades ==
Year	Awards Ceremony	Award	Name	Result
2018	55th Golden Horse Awards	Best New Director	Liu Ruoying	Nominated
2018	55th Golden Horse Awards	Best Supporting Actor	Tian Zhuangzhuang	Nominated
2018	55th Golden Horse Awards	Best Adapted Script	Yuan Yuan, He Yuming, Pan Wei, An Zhen, Liu Ruoying	Nominated
2018	55th Golden Horse Awards	Best editing	Liao Qingsong, Kong Jinlei	Nominated
2018	55th Golden Horse Awards	Best Original movie song	"We" original singer: Eason Chan / lyrics: Ge Dawei / Composer: Chen Jianwe	Nominated
2018	2018 Chinese Film Media Awards	Audience Favorite MV	"We"	Won
2018	2018 Chinese Film Media Awards	Most Popular Actress	Zhou Dongyu	Won
