= Wang Junkai =

Chinese actor and singer (born 1999)

- 王俊凯
- Wang in 2026
- Born: 21 September 1999 (age 27); Chongqing, China
- Education: Beijing Film Academy
- Occupations: Singer; actor
- Years active: 2013–present
- Musical career
- Also known as: Karry Wang
- Genres: Mandopop; dance
- Labels: Time Fengjun Entertainment (2010–); Karry Wang Studio (2017–); The H Collective (2018–); Shanghai Wang Junkai Film Studio (2018–)
- Member of: TFBoys

Chinese name
- Traditional Chinese: 王俊凱
- Simplified Chinese: 王俊凯
Transcriptions
Standard Mandarin
- Hanyu Pinyin: Wáng Jùnkǎi

Wang Junkai (simplified Chinese: 王俊凯; traditional Chinese: 王俊凱; pinyin: Wáng Jùnkǎi, born 21 September 1999), also known as Karry Wang, is a Chinese singer and actor. He debuted as the leader of TFBoys in 2013.

== Early life and education ==
Wang Junkai was born in Chongqing, China. Wang grew up mostly under his grandparents' care due to his parents' busy work schedules. His father used to be a taxi driver and his mother used to work as a hairdresser. In late 2010, he became one of the trainees under the TF Entertainment, and became the only trainee later on. Prior to his debut, Wang participated in TF Family's mini album I Don't Want to Change. He has released several cover songs online, and participated in audition programs. In particular, his cover of "Onion" (originally by Aska Yang) received attention and was covered by several news outlets. He officially debuted as a member of TFBoys on 6 August 2013, at the age of 13 alongside Roy Wang and Jackson Yee.

In 2017, he was enrolled into the Beijing Film Academy after having passed the college entrance examination; which received much media fanfare. He graduated in 2021.

== Career ==
In 2016, Wang released his first solo single "Ode to A Tree", which he took part in composing. In July, Wang released his second solo single, "Memory in Ferris Wheel" as part of the soundtrack of web series Finding Soul. The OST reached number 1 on the Billboard China V Chart for 3 consecutive weeks. The same year, Wang had a supporting role in Zhang Yimou's film The Great Wall.

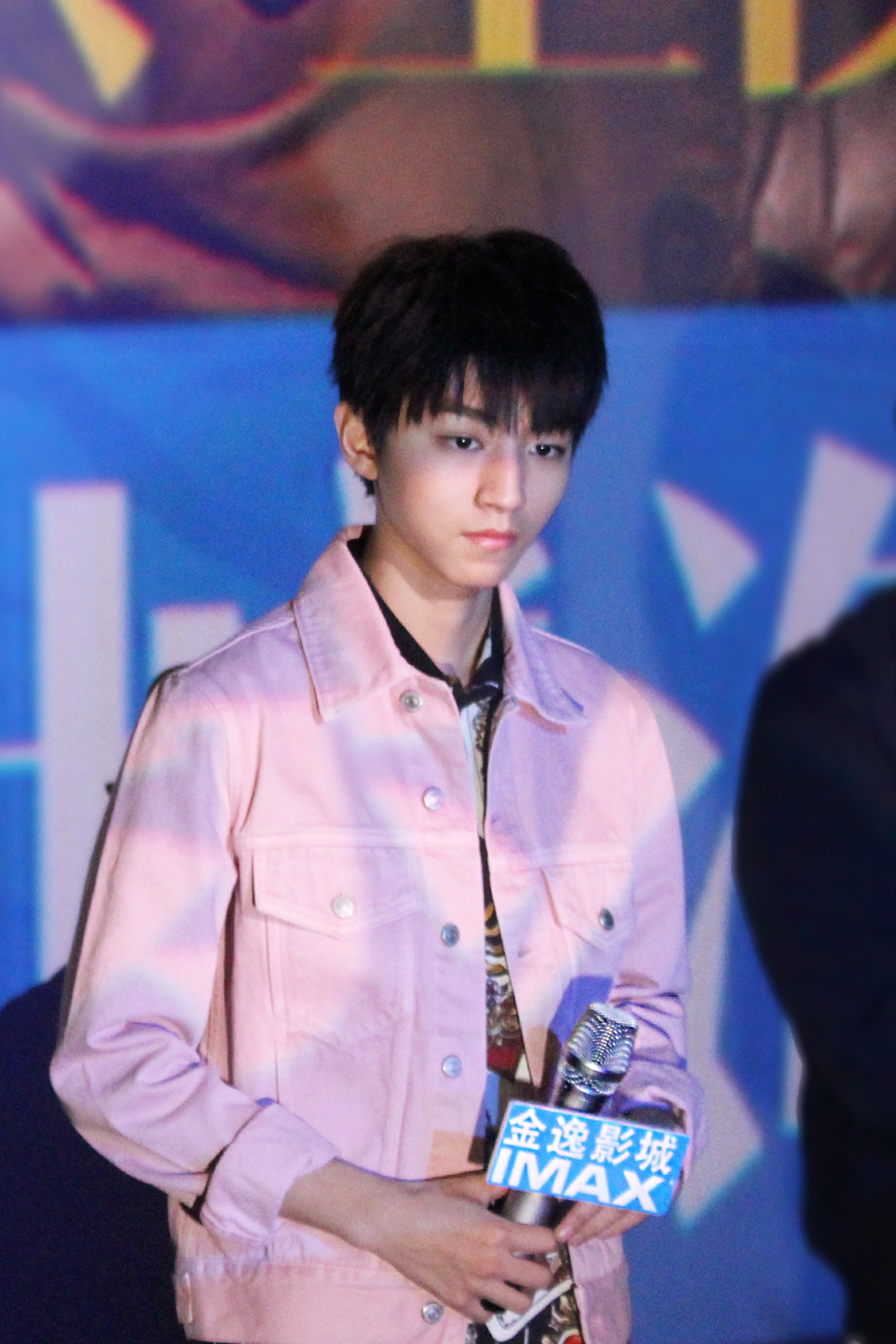
Wang in 2017

He released his third single "Homeward" in January 2017, produced by Li Ronghao. "Homeward" was named as one of the Top 10 Songs at the Fresh Asia Chart Festival 2017. In April, he joined the cast of variety program Give Me Five. The same year, Wang was named as the Chinese promotional ambassador for the film Kingsman: The Golden Circle and released the theme song "Become a Gentleman". In September, Wang released a single titled "Karry On" as part of as eighteenth birthday celebration. He then starred in the Chinese film adaptation of popular Japanese novel Miracles of the Namiya General Store, which premiered in December 2017. He sang the theme song of the film, titled "Train in the Mist" with Li Jian. Wang won the Golden Phoenix Awards for Best Newcomer with Namiya.

In 2018, Wang starred in the youth adventure drama Eagles and Youngster. The same year, it was announced that he will star in the fantasy animated film L.O.R.D: Legend of Ravaging Dynasties 2.

In 2019, Wang starred in the film Bureau 749 directed by Lu Chuan.

On 1 November 2019, Wang held his first solo concert called Karry's Dream Concert 2019 in Cadillac Center.

== Other activities ==
Wang held the Guinness World Records for having "the most reposted Weibo post" in 2015.

In March 2017, Wang was invited by Nike to take part in the design process of the new Air Max sneakers. In June, Wang made his walkway debut for fashion house Dolce & Gabbana during the Men's Spring/Summer 2018 fashion shows in Milan. The same year, Wang became the youngest male celebrity to grace the front cover of Harper's Bazaar and L'Officiel Hommes.

In December 2017, Wang was announced as the global brand ambassador for Swatch. In the same month, it was announced that the Industrial and Commercial Bank of China (ICBC) will work with Visa China and Wang, to bring to the public tailor-made "Galaxy·Karry Wang" credit card.

On 21 November 2018, Wang severed his ties with Dolce & Gabbana, ultimately ending his role as the ambassador for the brand after the Shanghai event controversy.

In August 2019, he appeared as a special guest with Ashin at Mayday's concert (Mayday 2019 Just Rock It!!!"蓝| BLUE) held at Beijing National Stadium, performing "Onion" with the band.

=== Social activities ===
In March 2017, Wang was appointed as one of the "Special Envoy of Youth Action" for "World Life Day", a joint campaign by the United Nations Environment Programme, International Fund for Animal Welfare and The Nature Conservancy.

On his 18th birthday, Wang announced the set up his own charity foundation – "Kindle Blue Fund". Its first project is to build a library for children who lived in the mountain area.

In April 2018, Wang was appointed by United Nations Environment Programme as the UN Environment National Goodwill Ambassador.

In 2019, Wang ranked 12th on Forbes China Celebrity 100 list.

In 2020, Wang ranked 10th on Forbes China Celebrity 100 list.

== Discography ==
=== Studio albums ===
- WJK (2026)

=== Singles ===
Title	Year	Peak chart positions	Album
Title	Year	CHN Billboard China Top 100	Album
As lead artist
"Young" (样)	2016	—	Non-album single
"Ode to A Tree" (树读)	2016	—	Non-album single
"Homeward" (小棉袄)	2017	—	Non-album single
Imperfect Child (不完美小孩)	2017	—	Non-album single
"Karry On" (焕蓝·未来)	2017	—	Non-album single
"Fulfill Our Generation's Dream" (圓夢一代)	2018	—	Non-album single
"You're Mine" (我的)	2018	50	Non-album single
"Awake" (醒着)	2018	71	Non-album single
"Growing" (生长)	2019	22	Non-album single
"Ain't got no love"	2019	—	Non-album single
"My Way" (流星)	2019	—	Non-album single
Collaborations
"China's Dream" (中国梦) (with various artists)	2017	—	—N/a
"Gravity" (心引力) (with Jolin Tsai)	2019	—	—N/a
Soundtrack appearances
"Memory in Ferris Wheel" (摩天轮的思念)	2016	—	Finding Soul OST
"Train in the Mist" (雾中列车)	2017	—	Namiya OST
"Proud Youth" (骄傲的少年) (with cast members)	2017	—	Give Me Five theme song
Promotional singles
"Become a Gentleman" (冷暖)	2017	—	Promotional song for Kingsman: The Golden Circle
"At The Free-Flowing Stream in Zhu Xian" (我在诛仙逍遥涧)	2018	—	Theme song of mobile game Zhu Xian
"Starry Sea" (星辰大海) (with 31 other actors)	2019	—	For China Movie Channel Young Actors Project
"Home Coming"(万里归途)	2022	—	Promotional song of the same name for "Home Coming"

== Filmography ==
=== Film ===
Year	English title	Chinese title	Role	Notes	Ref.
2015	Pound of Flesh	致命追击		Cameo	
2015	Mr. Six	老炮儿		Cameo	
2016	The Great Wall	长城	The Emperor	Cameo	
2017	Namiya	解忧杂货店	Xiao Bo		
2020	My People My Hometown	我和我的家乡	Jiang Xiaoyi		
2020	L.O.R.D: Legend of Ravaging Dynasties 2	冷血狂宴	Han Shuangshi		
2021	Ne Zha	叱咤风云		Cameo	
2021	1921	1921	Deng Enming		
2022	The Fallen Bridge	断桥	Meng Chao		
2022	Home Coming	万里归途	Cheng Lang		
2024	The Hedgehog	刺猬	Zhou Zheng		
2024	749 Bureau	749局	Ma Shan		
2025	Operation Hadal	蛟龙行动	Cao Honglang		
2025	Endless Journey of Love	时间之子	Shi Qi	Voice role	
2026	Traces of Justice	神探之痕迹	Ye Zhongcheng		

=== Television series ===
Year	English title	Chinese title	Role	Notes	Ref.
2016	Noble Aspirations	青云志	teenage Lin Jingyu	Cameo	
2016	Love for Separation	小别离	Li Xiang	Cameo	
2016	Finding Soul	超少年密码	Xia Chang'an / 001	Main Role	
2017	Boy Hood	我们的少年时代	Wu Tong	Main Role	
2018	Eagles and Youngster	天坑鹰猎	Zhang BaoQing	Main Role	
2019	I Am The Head Teacher	我是班主任	Bao Yan	Cameo	
2020	Guardians of the Ancient Oath	山海经之上古密约	Baili HaoHe	Supporting	
2021	Faith Makes Great	理想照耀中国	Ling Ming	Main Role	
2022	Be Reborn	重生之门	Zhuang WenJie	Main Role	

=== Variety show ===
Year	English title	Chinese title	Role	Ref.
2017	Give Me Five	高能少年团	Cast member	
2018	Give Me Five Season 2	高能少年团2	Cast member	
2018	Chinese Restaurant Season 2	中餐厅2	Cast member	
2019	Chinese Restaurant Season 3	中餐厅3	Cast member	
2020	Me to Us	我们的乐队	Cast member	
2021	Oh Youth	恰好是少年	Cast member	

== Accolades ==
=== Awards and nominations ===
Year	Award	Category	Nominated work	Results	Ref.
2015	Guinness World Record	Most forwarded Weibo post		Won	
2016	Fresh Asia Chart Festival	Top Ten Songs	"Young"	Won	
2017	Fresh Asia Chart Festival	Top Ten Songs	"Imperfect Child"	Won	
2017	Fresh Asia Chart Festival	Top Ten Songs	"Homeward"	Won	
2018	L'Officiel Night	Generation Breakthrough Award	—N/a	Won	
2019	17th Golden Phoenix Awards	Newcomer Award	Namiya	Won	
2019	16th Esquire Man At His Best Awards	Fashion Figure of the Year	—N/a	Won	
2019	16th Esquire Man At His Best Awards	Most Commercially Valuable Artist	—N/a	Won	
2020	Weibo Awards Ceremony	Popular Artist of the Year	—N/a	Won	
2021	Weibo Awards Ceremony	Musician of the Year	—N/a	Won	

=== Forbes China Celebrity 100 ===
Year	Rank	Ref.
2019	12th	
2020	10th	
2021	9th	
