= The Miracles of the Namiya General Store =

Novel by Keigo Higashino

- First edition (Japanese)
- Author: Keigo Higashino
- Language: Japanese
- Published: 2012
- Publisher: Kadokawa Shoten
- Publication place: Japan
- Awards: 7th Chūōkōron Prize
- ISBN: 978-4-04-110136-0

The Miracles of the Namiya General Store (ナミヤ雑貨店の奇蹟, Namiya Zakkaten no Kiseki) is a 2012 Japanese novel written by Keigo Higashino and published by Kadokawa Shoten.

== Plot ==
In 1980, the Namiya General Store becomes popular with citizens after its owner, Yūji Namiya, accepts people's advice letters seeking advice for anything troubling them, similar to an agony aunt. When the store is closed, people would drop their letters through a hole in the roll-up door, collected in a mailbox, and would receive a handwritten reply from Namiya in a milk box hung outside. In 2012, three delinquents, Atsuya, Shota and Kohei, take shelter in the abandoned Namiya General Store after committing some petty crimes. Staying until the morning, the boys' pillaging is mysteriously interrupted by an advice letter being dropped through the shutter, although nobody is outside. The letter is addressed to the General Store and traditionally was written by someone to consult about worries. Upon reading it, the boys realise it was written in 1980, 32 years ago. When Kohei decides to reply, the mysteries and secrets of the old General Store come to light, as their letters transcend time and space to touch a variety of characters, revealing Namiya's past, and follows the many miracles that intertwine the lives of the seemingly unrelated cast.

== Characters ==
=== Atsuya ===
The leader of the delinquent trio, Atsuya is an orphan who left home. He has a somewhat condescending, cold response to the letters of advice. In the movie, he becomes a nurse after the incident.

=== Kohei ===
Atsuya's childhood friend and fellow orphan, he is sensitive and plays the mediator between Atsuya and Shota. Out of boredom, he triggers the story's chain of events by wholeheartedly replying to the advice letters. In the movie, he becomes a chef after the incident.

=== Shota ===
Atsuya's childhood friend and fellow orphan, he is headstrong and sometimes gets into arguments with Atsuya. In the movie, he becomes an aerospace technician after the incident.

=== Yūji Namiya ===
The benevolent owner and sole manager of Namiya General Store, who takes it upon himself to respond to every troubled letter requesting advice that comes his way. As he struggles with pancreatic cancer, he dedicates the remainder of his life to replying to the letters, hoping that he can change the course of someone's life for the better.

== Reception ==
The novel won the 7th Chūōkōron Prize. It has had sales of more than 1.6 million copies in China.

== Adaptation ==
=== Stage ===
==== 2013 edition ====
It was performed by the theater group Caramel Box at the Sunshine Theater from May 11 to June 2, 2013, and at the Shin-Kobe Oriental Theater from June 9 to 16. Written and directed by Yutaka Narui. Partly double-cast. There were three performances, "Harmonica at dawn", "Civic until morning", and "Pray from the sky", and due to time constraints, "Answer in the milk box" and "Silent prayer in the Beatles" were cut. It was Along with that, there are changes such as the appearance of people who should not appear in that volume. In addition, the gender of Shota was changed to Shoko and Yoshikazu Minazuki was changed to Yoshiko Minazuki.

Cast

- Naoto Tada as Atsuya Kiryu
- Anri Watanabe as Shoko Ota
- Shunsaku Tsutsui as Kohei Isesaki
- Tomoyuki Hatanaka as Katsuro Matsuoka / Toshinori Namiya (Takayuki's son) / Shigekazu Kozuka.
- Hiroyuki Sato as Takeo Matsuoka / Genta Annaka (100-point kid) / Eisuke Toshima (Senior Managing Director of Little Dog)
- Satsuki Okada as Kanako Matsuoka / Yoriko Namiya / Harumi Muto
- Takako Hayashi as Emiko Matsuoka / Wakana Kawabe (daughter of Midori Kawabe) / Kimiko Kozuka
- Hideaki Suzuki and Yosuke Kezuka as Shigezo Matsuoka (Katsuro's uncle) / Shungo Namiya / Shinji Tomioka
- Aya Maeda as Yoshiko Minazuki / Midori Kawabe
- Kiri Harada as Seri Suwon / Akiko Minazuki
- Ayana Sasagawa and Haruyo Kobayashi as Hiroko Tatebayashi (Minatsuki family maid) / Tatsuyuki Suwon / Hideyo Tamura
- Joji Abe as Shizuto Numata (Messenger of the Minazuki family) / Takayuki Namiya / Soichi Kamiya (deputy director)
- Hiroyuki Nishikawa as Yuji Namiya

==== 2016 edition ====
It was performed at Zepp Blue Theater Roppongi and Theater BRAVA! As a version of "Nebula Project Pia Theater BRAVA! Presents" from April 21st to May 8th, 2016 . Like the 2013 theater group Caramel Box performance, the script and direction is Yutaka Narui, but this time it is a production performance.

==== Musical version (2017) ====
It was performed by the musical company It's Foleys at Pocket Square The Pocket (Nakano-ku, Tokyo) as a musical version from May 17 to 21, 2017.

=== Film ===
==== Japanese film ====
A Japanese adaptation which directed by Ryūichi Hiroki was released on 23 September 2017.

Cast

- Ryosuke Yamada as Atsuya
- Nijirō Murakami as Shota
- Kanichiro as Kohei
- Toshiyuki Nishida as Yūji Namiya
- Machiko Ono as Harumi Tamura
- Kento Hayashi as Katsuro Matsuoka
- Riko Narumi as Akiko Minazuki
- Mugi Kadowaki as Seri
- Masato Hagiwara as Takayuki Namiya
- Kaoru Kobayashi as Takeo Matsuoka
- Rio Suzuki as young Seri
- Rio Yamashita as Mieko Kawabe
- Kazuko Yoshiyuki as Hideyo Tamura
- Panta as Yoshikazu Minazuki
- Tōru Tezuka as Mr. Kariya

==== Chinese film ====
A Chinese adaptation produced by Emperor Motion Pictures and Wanda Media was released on 29 December 2017. It stars Jackie Chan as the titular shop owner.

=== Television ===
A Korean adaptation produced by The Lamp and will be released on Disney+ in 2027. It stars Ryu Seung-ryong as the shop owner.
