= Ying Rudi =

Chinese professional ice hockey player (born 1998)

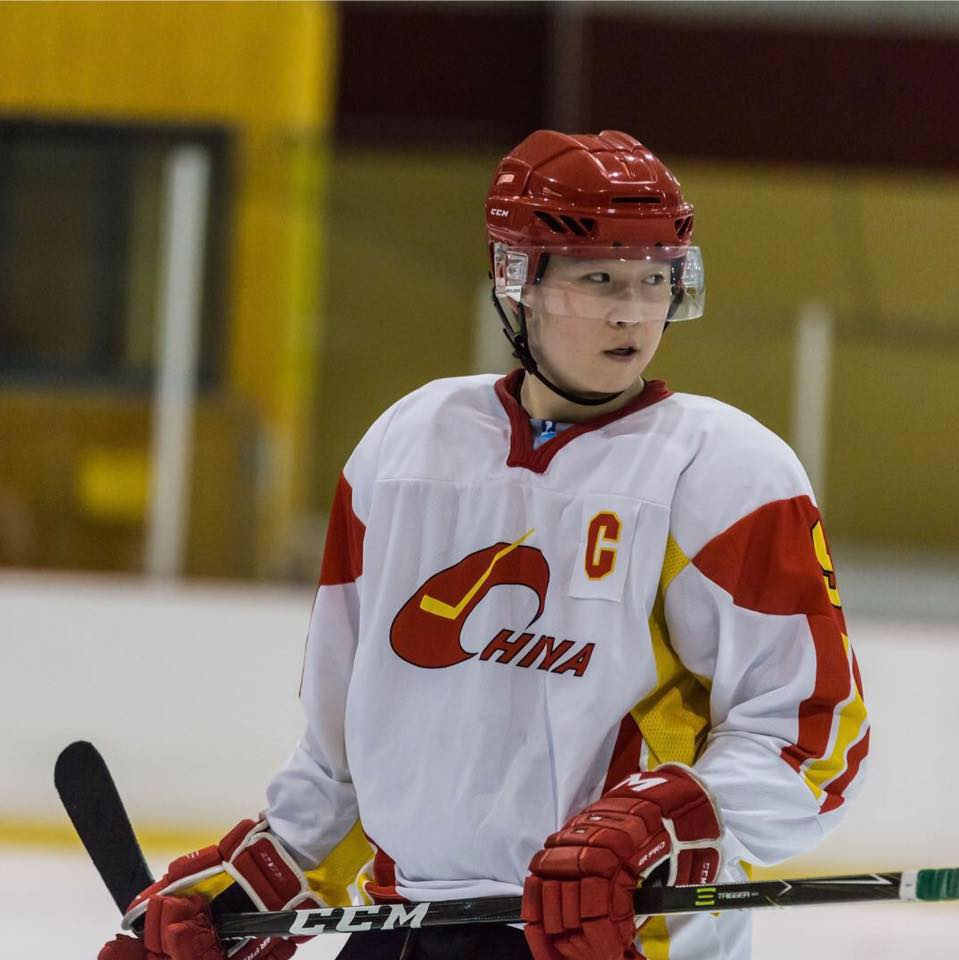
- Ying at the 2017 U20 Men's World Championships
- Born: August 16, 1998 (age 27) Beijing, China
- Height: 6 ft 1 in (185 cm)
- Weight: 169 lb (77 kg; 12 st 1 lb)
- Position: Centre
- Shot: Right
- Played for: Kunlun Red Star
- National team: China
- Playing career: 2016–2022

Ying Rudi (simplified Chinese: 英如镝; traditional Chinese: 英如鏑; pinyin: Yīng Rúdí; born August 16, 1998) is a Chinese former professional ice hockey player who played for Kunlun Red Star of the Kontinental Hockey League (KHL). Born in China, Ying first played hockey in Beijing, moving to the United States at age 9 to further his career. He returned to Beijing in 2016, becoming the first Chinese-born player to play in the KHL. Internationally he has represented China at both the junior and senior levels. Ying is also the son of actor Ying Da and the grandson of actor Ying Ruocheng.

== Early life and education ==
Ying Rudi was born in Beijing on August 16, 1998, to Ying Da, a director and actor, and Liang Huan (梁欢).

== Playing career ==
=== Youth and junior ===
Ying played youth hockey in China for the Beijing Cubs of the Beijing Youth Hockey League (BYHL) before moving to the Chicago Mission of the High Performance Hockey League (HPHL) at age 9. Ying joined the Boston Junior Bruins U18 team in the Eastern Junior Elite Prospects League for the 2012–13 season, before transferring to play for the junior varsity team of Phillips Exeter Academy.

After two years at Exeter, Ying signed with the Toronto Patriots of the Ontario Junior Hockey League (OJHL), where he played for the remainder of the 2015–16 season.

=== Professional ===
On August 16, 2016, Ying signed a two-year contract with Kunlun Red Star of the Kontinental Hockey League (KHL). He was the first Chinese-born player to play in the KHL or NHL. After a year with the team, in which he acquired no points in 25 games, Ying was sent down to KRS Heilongjiang, the developmental minor-league affiliate team of Kunlun Red Star.

== International play ==
Ying represented China as a 16-year-old at the 2014 IIHF World U18 Championship Division II. The youngest player on the team, Ying recorded seven points (five goals and two assists) in five games, the most out of any Chinese player at the tournament. He was named to the U18 Division II-B All Star Team.

Ying played for China again in 2015, where he again led the team in points, with seven (six goals and one assist). In 2016, Ying captained his team at the same tournament where he tallied three points (two goals and one assist) in four games.

In 2017, Ying captained the Chinese U20 National Team at the 2017 World Junior Ice Hockey Championships – Division III, where his team won second place. Despite China's loss in the finals, Ying gave a dominant individual performance, leading the tournament with 19 points (9 goals and 10 assists) in 5 games. He was awarded Best Forward of the Tournament, Best Player of Team China, as well as 2 Best Player of the Game awards.

Ying also participated at the 2017 Men's World Ice Hockey Championships and 2018 Men's World Ice Hockey Championships.

== Personal life ==
Ying first began playing hockey at a Beijing mall, skating while his mother shopped. His parents decided to send him to the United States when he was nine to further his career. Initially, Ying lived in Chicago but later moved to the Boston area, where he studied at Fay School in Southborough and then entered Phillips Exeter Academy, a prep school known for its academics.

== Ancestry ==
His great-great-grandfather Ying Lianzhi (英敛之; 1867–1926) was the founder of Takungpao and Fu Jen Catholic University. His great-great-grandmother Aisin Gioro Shuzhong (爱新觉罗·淑仲) was a member of the Qing dynasty royal family. His great-great-maternal grandfather Cai Rukai (蔡儒楷; 1867–1923) was president of National Beiyang University. His great-grandfather Ying Qianli (英千里; 1900–1969) was a professor at National Taiwan University and Fu Jen Catholic University. His great-grandmother Cai Baozhen (蔡葆真) was president of Beijing Children's Library. His grandmother (吴世良) was a translator and interpreter of Zhou Enlai. His grandfather Ying Ruocheng was a director, actor, playwright and vice minister of culture from 1986 to 1990. His aunt Ying Xiaole (英小乐) is a Chinese-American painter.

16. Ying Lianzhi
8. Ying Qianli
17. Aisin Gioro Shuzhong
4. Ying Ruocheng
18. Cai Rukai
9. Cai Baozhen
19.
2. Ying Da
10.
5. Wu Shiliang
11.
1. Ying Rudi
12.
6. Fan Rongkang (Liang Da)
13.
3. Liang Huan
14.
7. Shen Rong
15.

== Career statistics ==
=== Regular season and playoffs ===
			Regular season					Playoffs
Season	Team	League	GP	G	A	Pts	PIM	GP	G	A	Pts	PIM
2012–13	Boston Jr. Bruins 18U AAA	EJEPL	19	4	5	9	2	4	0	0	0	0
2013–14	Beijing Ice Hockey	China	—	—	—	—	—	—	—	—	—	—
2014–15	Beijing Ice Hockey	China	—	—	—	—	—	—	—	—	—	—
2014–15	Connecticut Nighthawks	MetJHL	8	1	0	1	2	—	—	—	—	—
2014–15	Phillips Exeter Academy	USHS	14	0	1	1	—	—	—	—	—	—
2015–16	Valley Jr. Warriors 18U AAA	MHSL	14	4	7	11	4	—	—	—	—	—
2015–16	Toronto Patriots	OJHL	19	2	1	3	30	—	—	—	—	—
2016–17	Kunlun Red Star	KHL	25	0	0	0	2	—	—	—	—	—
2017–18	KRS Heilongjiang	VHL	42	2	0	2	18	—	—	—	—	—
2017–18	KRS Junior	MHL	6	1	3	4	20	—	—	—	—	—
2018–19	KRS–ORG	VHL	51	4	16	20	79	—	—	—	—	—
2018–19	Kunlun Red Star	KHL	2	1	0	1	0	—	—	—	—	—
2019–20	KRS–BSU	VHL	53	4	12	16	28	—	—	—	—	—
2021–22	Kunlun Red Star	KHL	20	1	0	1	6	—	—	—	—	—
KHL totals			47	2	0	2	8	—	—	—	—	—

=== International ===
Year	Team	Event	GP	G	A	Pts	PIM
2014	China	WJC18 D2B	5	5	2	7	12
2015	China	WJC18 D2B	5	6	1	7	12
2016	China	WJC18 D2B	4	2	1	3	33
2017	China	WJC D3	5	9	10	19	0
2017	China	WC D2B	5	1	3	4	18
2018	China	WJC D3	5	8	6	14	4
2018	China	WC D2A	2	0	0	0	2
2019	China	WC D2A	5	1	2	3	4
2022	China	OG	4	0	0	0	4
Junior totals			24	30	20	50	61
Senior totals			16	2	5	7	28
