= Ying Da =

Chinese actor and director

- 英达
- Born: July 7, 1960 (age 66); Beijing, China
- Education: Peking University; University of Missouri
- Occupations: Actor, director
- Years active: 1988–present
- Agent: Beijing Yingshi Visual Arts Limited Liability Company
- Spouses: Ge Xin (m. 1985–1987) Song Dandan (m. 1989–1997) Liang Huan (m. 1997)
- Children: 3, including Ying Rudi
- Parent(s): Ying Ruocheng; Wu Shiliang
- Relatives: Ying Lianzhi (great-grandfather); Shuzhong (great-grandmother); Cai Rukai (great-maternal grandfather); Ying Qianli (grandfather); Cai Baozhen (grandmother)

Chinese name
- Traditional Chinese: 英達
- Simplified Chinese: 英达
Transcriptions
Standard Mandarin
- Hanyu Pinyin: Yīng Dá

Ying Da (Chinese: 英达; born July 7, 1960) is a Chinese actor and director with Manchu origin. He is known for film roles as Louie Wang in Big Shot's Funeral (2001), for which he won the Hundred Flowers Award for Best Supporting Actor, Ni Zhengyu in The Tokyo Trial (2006) and Jin Shenghuo in The Message (2009), as well as for his television performances as Zhao Xinmei in Fortress Besieged (1990) and Leng Zixing in The Dream of Red Mansions (2008). As a director, Ying is credited with introducing the sitcom genre to China with I Love My Family (1993). His other directorial works include Idler: Sister Ma (1999), Sister Ma and Her Neighborhoods (2000), and We Are A Family (2013).

== Early life and education ==
Ying was born in Beijing on July 7, 1960, to Ying Ruocheng, a director, actor, playwright and vice minister of culture from 1986 to 1990, and Wu Shiliang (吴世良), a translator and interpreter of Zhou Enlai. His sister Ying Xiaole (英小乐) is a Chinese-American painter.

Ying's parents were arrested in 1968 during the Cultural Revolution of China, and 8 year-old Ying was passed between relatives and got acquainted with a gang of older delinquents. In 1973, after his parents were released from jail, Ying resumed studies at the Beijing No. 72 Middle School, where he studied alongside Jiang Wen. After completing his bachelor's degree in science from Peking University in 1983, he was assigned to Beijing Normal School in Dongcheng District as a teacher. Ying received a master's degree in literature and art from the University of Missouri in 1987, that same year he returned to Beijing.

== Career ==
Ying made his film debut in Xie Jin's The Last Aristocrats, playing Zhou Daqing.

In 1990, he was director of the People's Arts Theatre of Beijing. That same year, for his role as Zhao Xinmei in Fortress Besieged, he was nominated for the Hundred Flowers Award for Best Supporting Actor at the 13th Hundred Flowers Awards.

In 1993, Ying had a cameo appearance in Chen Kaige's Farewell My Concubine, a drama film starring Leslie Cheung, Zhang Fengyi and Gong Li.

In 1997, Ying starred with Ng Man-tat, Eric Tsang, Zhao Benshan, Song Dandan in the comedy film Family Harmony. It earned good ratings nationwide. That same year, he starred opposite Ge You, Xu Fan, He Bing, Liu Bei in Feng Xiaogang's comedy film The Dream Factory.

In 2001, he starred in the comedy film Big Shot's Funeral, alongside Rosamund Kwan, Paul Mazursky, Donald Sutherland. The film marked the second collaboration between Ying Da and Feng Xiaogang. He received a Hundred Flowers Award for Best Supporting Actor at the 25th Hundred Flowers Awards for the role.

In 2005, he appeared in Waiting Alone, a romantic comedy starring Xia Yu, Gong Beibi and Li Bingbing.

In 2006, Ying portrayed Ni Zhengyu in the historical film The Tokyo Trial, directed by Gao Qunshu.

In 2008, Ying participated in Chen Kaige's Forever Enthralled as Feng Ziguang, a friend of Leon Lai and Zhang Ziyi's characters. That same year, he made a guest appearance as Leng Zixing in The Dream of Red Mansions, adapted from Qing dynasty novelist Cao Xueqin's classical novel of the same title.

In 2009, he starred in an espionage thriller called The Message with Zhou Xun, Li Bingbing, Zhang Hanyu, Huang Xiaoming, Alec Su, and Wang Zhiwen. The film was directed by Chen Kuo-fu and Gao Qunshu and based on Mai Jia's novel. That same year, he had a minor role in Huang Jianxin and Han Sanping's historical film The Founding of a Republic.

In 2010, Ying co-starred with Guo Tao, Hu Jing, Ada Choi and Kingdom Yuen in the romantic film The Love Clinic. That same year, he had key supporting role in East Wind Rain, a spy drama starring Liu Yunlong, Fan Bingbing and Li Xiaoran. He co-starred with Zhu Shimao, Chen Peisi, Vivian Wu and Qiao Renliang in the comedy film Under the Influence. Ying also hosted the Chinese version of Family Feud from October 2010 to January 2011.

In 2011, he had a supporting role in the horror thriller film The Devil Inside Me. The film was directed by Zhang Qi and starred Tony Leung Ka-fai, Kelly Lin, Huang Weide and Anya Wu. He had a minor role in the romantic comedy Dear Enemy, which starred Xu Jinglei, Stanley Huang, Gigi Leung, Aarif Rahman, Christy Chung, Michael Wong, and Zhao Baogang.

In 2012, he played Mr. Ming, the lead role in Hu Qiang's You and Me, costarring Tarcy Su and Jeff Chang. He was nominated for Golden Lotus Award for Best Actor at the 2nd Macau International Movie Festival.

In 2014, Ying played the lead role in the comedy film Hot Blood Band, alongside Chen Xiang, Leon Dai, Anthony Wong, Kathy Chow and Cai Ming.

== Personal life ==
Ying has married three times. His first wife was his schoolmate at Peking University, Ge Xin. They married in 1985 and divorced in 1987.

He married for the second time in 1989 to actress Song Dandan. The couple have a son Ying Rubin, who goes by Batu. They divorced in 1997.

On February 24, 1997, Ying married Liang Huan (梁欢), 8 years his junior, in Beijing. They have a son Ying Rudi, who is a member of the China men's national ice hockey team, and a daughter Ying Wendi.

== Ancestry ==
His great-grandfather Ying Lianzhi (英敛之; 1867–1926) was the founder of Takungpao and Fu Jen Catholic University. His great-grandmother Shuzhong (淑仲) was a member of the Qing dynasty royal family. His great-maternal grandfather Cai Rukai (蔡儒楷; 1867–1923) was president of National Beiyang University. His grandfather Ying Qianli (英千里; 1900–1969) was a professor at National Taiwan University and Fu Jen Catholic University. His grandmother Cai Baozhen (蔡葆真) was president of Beijing Children's Library.

8. Ying Lianzhi
4. Ying Qianli
9. Aisin Gioro Shuzhong
2. Ying Ruocheng
10. Cai Rukai
5. Cai Baozhen
11.
1. Ying Da
6.
3. Wu Shiliang
7.

== Filmography ==
=== Film ===
Year	English title	Chinese title	Role	Notes
1988	The Last Aristocrats	最后的贵族	Zhou Daqing	
1991	Family Portrait	四十不惑	Guest	
1993	Farewell My Concubine	霸王别姬	Na Kun	
1997	The Dream Factory	甲方乙方	Bookstore manager	
1997	Family Harmony	家和万事兴	Manager	
2001	Big Shot's Funeral	大腕	Louie Wang	
2005	Waiting Alone	独自等待	Television director	
2006	The Tokyo Trial	东京审判	Ni Zhengyu	
2008	Forever Enthralled	梅兰芳	Feng Ziguang	
2008	The Good Luck is High to Shine on	鸿运高照	Hou Fei	
2009	The Message	风声	Jin Shenghuo	
2009	The Founding of a Republic	建国大业	Guest	
2010	The Love Clinic	爱情维修站	Jiang Dong	
2010	East Wind Rain	东风雨	Laoyi	
2010	Under the Influence	戒烟不戒酒	President Niu	
2011	The Devil Inside Me	夺命心跳	Guest	
2011	Dear Enemy	亲密敌人	Amy's father	
2012	You and Me	我和你	Mr. Ming	
2014	Hot Blood Band	热血男人帮	Laotie	
2018	21 Karat			
2019	I'll Complete for the Top			

=== TV series ===
Year	English title	Chinese title	Role	Notes
1990	Fortress Besieged	围城	Zhao Xinmei	
1991		大路通天	Guest	
1992	No Way to Love You	爱你没商量	Fang Bo	
1998	Beijing Woman	北京女人	Guest	
2003	Romantic Affairs	浪漫的事	Huang Xianwei	
2003		人生几度秋凉	The Marshal	
2004	In the Age of Blooming Teen	豆蔻年华		
2005		爱如风过	Guest	
2007		地下交通站	Ishihara	
2008	The Dream of Red Mansions	红楼梦	Leng Zixing	
2009	They Call Her Mom	美丽的事	Yuan Hang	
2009	Women in the Yard	大宅院的女人	Mr. Lin	
2010		家庭赛乐赛	Himself (host)	Chinese version of Family Feud
2011	Be On The Sick List	老病号	Yang Gong	
2011	Secret War in Emei	密战峨眉	Mao Shuyi	
2011	Confused Love	糊涂的爱	Du Anze	
2011		古今六人行		
2011		战火西北狼	Hu Zongnan	
2011	Legend of Wei Zhenguo	韦振国传奇	Chen Kuangsi	
2012	Tang Dynasty Romantic Hero	唐朝浪漫英雄	Tao's father	
2012	Editorial Department Story	新编辑部故事的故事	The producer	
2012	Puzzle	没有硝烟的战斗	Chen Fanxiong	

=== As director ===
Year	English title	Chinese title	Notes
1993	I Love My Family	我爱我家	
1995		起步停车	
1996		百老汇100号	
1997	Story of the Waiting Room	候车室的故事	
1997		新72家房客	
1998	Psychological Clinic	心理诊所	
1998	Chinese Restaurant	中国餐馆	
1999	Idler: Sister Ma	闲人马大姐	
2000		一手托两家	
2000	Sister Ma and Her Neighborhoods	马大姐和邻居们	
2001	A family in the Northeast of China	东北一家人	
2001	The Joy of Spring	欢乐青春	
2002	The Family of Hu in Xi'an	西安虎家	
2002		全时空接触	
2003	Stories of the Sales Office	售楼处的故事	
2003		带着孩子结婚	
2004	Family Harmony	家和万事兴	
2004	Legend of Brother Ba	巴哥正传	
2004	Stories of the Tourist Agency	旅行社的故事	
2007		地下交通站	
2013	We Are A Family	我们一家人	
2016	Rocket of China	龙号机车	

== Film and TV Awards ==
Year	Nominated work	Award	Result	Notes
1990	Fortress Besieged	Hundred Flowers Award for Best Supporting Actor	Nominated	
2002	Big Shot's Funeral	Hundred Flowers Award for Best Supporting Actor	Won	
2012	You and Me	Golden Lotus Award for Best Actor	Nominated	
