= Song Dandan =

Chinese skit and sitcom actress (born 1961)

- 宋丹丹
- Born: 25 August 1961 (age 65); Beijing, China
- Other name: Song Changying
- Occupations: Actress, Comedian
- Years active: 1989–present
- Spouse(s): Unknown (m. 1986–1987); Ying Da (m. 1989–1997); Yuji Zhao (m. 1997–present)
- Children: Ying Batu (born 1990)
- Awards: Shanghai Television Festival – Best Actress; 2008 Marvin's War; 2013 Jin Tailang's Love

Chinese name
- Chinese: 宋丹丹
Transcriptions
Standard Mandarin
- Hanyu Pinyin: Sòng Dāndān
- Musical career
- Genre: Drama

Song Dandan (Chinese: 宋丹丹; pinyin: Sòng Dāndān; born 25 August 1961) is a Chinese actress, best known for her comedic performance through her collaborations with Zhao Benshan on the CCTV Spring Festival Gala.

== Biography ==
Song was born in Beijing, on August 25, 1961, to an intellectual family. Her father Song Gong (宋汎) was vice chairman of Beijing Federation of Literary and Art Circles. Her brother Song Beisha (宋北杉; born 1951) was vice governor of Shanxi and vice chairman of All-China Federation of Industry and Commerce.

She was trained and started as a drama actress. But it was her skit debut, "A Date with Slug," on the 1989 CCTV New Year's Gala that propelled her to fame. Afterwards she costarred first with Huang Hong, then most memorably with Zhao Benshan in many skits on the CCTV New Year's Gala from the 1990s to the 2010s, such as "Anti-family plan Guerilla" and "Yesterday, today and Tomorrow".

On television, Song is known for her roles in sitcoms I Love My Family (我爱我家), directed by her then husband Ying Da, and Home with Kids (家有儿女). Song also has a cameo role in House of Flying Daggers.

== Personal life ==
Song was married three times. Three months after the end of her first relationship, she entered into a marriage with her first husband, whose identity has not been publicly disclosed. The rebound marriage ended in divorce the following year. In 1989, she married her second husband, director Ying Da. The couple have a son, born Ying Rubin (英如镔), who goes by stage name Batu (巴图). They divorced in 1997 after Song confessed that she had an affair. In 2011, Song publicly accused Ying Da of having harmed their son by deliberately remaining estranged from Batu for over 14 years, while showing preference toward his other son from his second marriage.

In 1997, following her divorce from Ying, Song met Zhao Yuji (赵玉吉), whom she married 28 days after being introduced to him. Zhao, who had served as general manager of Shougang Group from 1985 to 1991, later became a businessman, active in real estate and private equity. Song's stepdaughter from Zhao's previous marriage is the Academy Award-winning filmmaker Chloé Zhao.

In 2021, Song was among 40 Chinese celebrities who canceled sponsorship contracts as part of a larger boycott against foreign brands that expressed concern about the persecution of Uyghurs in the Xinjiang autonomous region.

== Filmography ==
=== Television ===
Year	Title	Role	Partner	Note
1985	Xun Zhao Hui Lai De Shi Jie (寻找回来的世界)	Song Xiaoli	Wang Gang, Xu Yajun	
1989	Hao Nan Hao Nv (好男好女)	Cai Fang	Li Baotian	
1992	Ai Ni Mei Shang Liang (爱你没商量)	Zhou Hua	Xie Yuan, Ma Ling	
1994	I Love My Family	He Ping	Wen Xingyu, Yang Lixin	
1994	Bao Gong Qi An (包公奇案)			
1996	Broadway 100	Lin Beibei	Liu Xiaofeng, Liu WeI	
2000	Hao Ri Zi Yi Qi Guo (好日子一起过)	Cousin driver	Lv Lipeng, Ding Zhicheng	
2001	Jue Se Shuang Jiao (绝色双娇)	Liu Jinhua	Zhang Ting, Jiao Enjun	
2002	Huo Ge Jing Shen Tou (活个精神头)		Li Ding, Wen Xingyu	
2002	Jue Se Shuang Jiao 2 (绝色双娇2)	Liu Jinhua	Zhang Ting, Wu Mengda	
2002	Amazing Cases	Yu Huixin	Su Youpeng, Kou Zhenhai	
2002	Pai An Jing Qi (拍案惊奇)			
2002	Wo Ai Wo Che (我爱我车)	Lin Xiaoyu	Yang Lixin, Wen Xingyu, Liang Tian	
2003	Xin Yu Zhe (心语者)		Yang Lixin	
2003	家和万事兴之善意的谎言	Xue Ying	Wu Mengda, Zhao Benshan	
2003	家和万事兴之我的新郎	Song Cuifen	Zeng Zhiwei	
2003	Yao Zi Cheng Long (遥子成龙)	Shen Lili	Chen Hanbai	
2003	结婚快乐			
2003	Return Of Judge Bao IV	Yi Zhi Hua	Jin Chaoqun, Jiao Enjun	
2004	Home With Kids	Liu Mei	Gao Yalin, Zhang Yishan, Yang Zi	
2004	Kong Fang Zi (空房子)	Yang Hongying	Li Mingqi, Wang Lin	
2005	Home With Kids 2	Liu Mei	Gao Yalin, Zhang Yishan, Yang Zi	
2005	Chen Shi Xiao Tan (尘世笑谈)	Si Gu	Xie Yuan, He Bing	
2006	Tan Tan Xin Lian Lian Ai (谈谈心恋恋爱)	Feng Linglong	Lei Kesheng	
2007	低头不见抬头见	Guest	Huang Hong, Guo Da	
2007	爱情来电显示		Fu Jia	
2007	Home With Kids 3	Liu Mei	Gao Yalin, Ning Danlin	
2008	马文的战争	Yang Xin	Lin Yongjian, Li Chongxiao	
2008	把日子过好	Tang Yunqing	Hou Tianlai, Tang XIaoning	
2008	Home With Kids 4	Liu Mei	Gao Yalin, Ning Danlin	
2008	家在洹上	Er Niu	Yuan Li, Liu Xinyi	
2008	二哥	Boss Wang's Wife	Liu Jinshan, Hong Jiantao	
2009	相伴	He Guoyu	Zhang Guoli, Han Yuqin, Liu Xiaoqian	
2009	老牛家的战争	Zi Xia	Zhang Hongjie, Qin Weidong, Zhou Dongqi	
2009	圆圆的故事	He Ping	Guan Ling, Jiang Chao	
2010	李春天的春天	Li Chuntian	Yu Yajun, Li Jiaxuan, Wang Sisi	
2010	Family, Power N	Wen Nan	Zhao Baogang, Zhu Yuchen, Wang Ziwen	
2010	林师傅在首尔	Yu Jianing's Mother	Zhang RuiXi, Ning Danning	
2011	金太狼的幸福生活	Wang Shuhua	Li Xiaolu, Wang Lei, Fan Ming	
2011	妈妈的花样年华	Wen Yinghe	Lin Yongjian, Zhou Dongqi, Ba Tu	
2012	Mi Family's Marriage	Wu Qionghua	Zhang Hongjie, Fu Jing, Zhong Dongqi	
2012	Beautiful Contract	Hua Meili	Ba Tu, Fan Ming, Wu Wenjia	
2013	My Son Is Wonderful	Lin Chang	Tong Dawei, Guan Yue, Liu Yun	
2014	MISSION IMPOSSIBLE LOVE		Yao Di, Lei Mingfan, Fan Ming	
2017	Dear My Friends	亲爱的她们	Vivian Wu, Yvonne Yung, Zhang Ruoyun	
2020	The Stage	我待生活如初恋		

=== Pieces ===
Year	Title	Partner
1989	Lan Han Xiang Qin (懒汉相亲)	Lei Kengsheng, Zhao Lianjia
1990	Chao Sheng You Ji Dui (超生游击队)	Huang Hong
1991	Hand In Hand	Huang Hong
1991	Babysitter and carpenter	Huang Hong
1992	Yang Ge Qing (秧歌情)	Huang Hong
1992	Wedding (婚礼)	Huang Hong
1998	Going Home (回家)	Huang Hong
1999	Yesterday, Today, Tomorrow (昨天，今天，明天)	Zhao Benshan, Cui Yongyuan
1999	Lao Ban (老伴)	Zhao Benshan
2000	Zhong Dian Gong (钟点工)	Zhao Benshan
2006	Shuo Shi (说事)	Zhao Benshan, Cui Yongyuan
2007	Ce Hua (策划)	Zhao Benshan, Niu Qun
2008	Huo Ju Shou (火炬手)	Zhao Benshan, Liu liu

=== Drama ===
Year	Title	Role	Notes
1982	Bu Jin Chang Jiang (不尽长江)	Zheng Xiaomei	
1983	Wang Jian Guo Dang Guan (王建国当官)	Female	
1983	'Wu Wang Jin Ge Yue Wang Jian (吴王金戈越王剑)'	Ji Zi	
1984	Hong Bai Xi Shi (红白喜事)	Ling Zhi	
1984	Home	Wang Er	
1986	Blessed by God	Constanze Mozart	
1987	Arsonist	Anna	
1988	Tai Ping Hu (太平湖)	Female Soider	
1988	Woyzeck	Mary	
1991	Major Barbara (芭巴拉上校)	Major Barbara	
1992	Cha Guan (茶馆)	Xiao Dingbao	
1992	Hui Gui (回归)	Luo Zha	won Chinese Plum Performance Award
2002	Wan Jia Deng Huo (万家灯火)	He Lao Tai	Total of 100 performances
2004	Wan Jia Deng Huo (万家灯火)	He Lao Tai	Won Chinese Drama Golden Lion Award
2005	Cha Guan (茶馆)	Kang Shunzi	First performance in North America
2006	White Deer Plain	Xiao Eh	
2008–2009	Cha Guan (茶馆)	Kang Shunzi	
2009	Wo Tou Hui Guan (窝头会馆)	Tian Cuilan	As Act 1 Assistant Director, Total of 36 performances
2010	Wo Tou Hui Guan (窝头会馆)	Tian Cuilan	Third Round of Performance

=== Film ===
Year	Title	Role
1985	Yue Ya Er (月芽儿)	Han Yuerong
1985	Nan Fu Ke Nv Zhu Ren (男妇科女主人)	Feng Lian
1986	Field Is the Green Curtain Of Tall Crops Again	Ya Dan
1988	The Silly Manager	Ying Zi
1992	The Analects of Confucius (四十不惑)	Duan Jinghua
1997	The Red Suit (红西装)	Qi Hongguang
2001	Family Ties	Fafang
2004	House of Flying Daggers	Yee
2007	Going Home (落叶归根)	Female
2007	Happy New Year	Ah Ying
2010	Major Secretary	Shanghai Railway Officer
2013	Personal Tailor	Dan Jie
2015	Follow Me My Queen	
