= Ying Ruocheng =

Chinese actor, translator (1929–2003)

- 英若诚

Vice-Minister of Culture
- In office 1986–1990
- Minister: Wang Meng

Personal details
- Born: June 21, 1929 Beijing, China
- Died: December 27, 2003 (aged 74) Beijing, China
- Party: Chinese Communist Party
- Spouse: Wu Shiliang (m. 1950; died 1987)
- Relations: Ying Lianzhi (grandfather); Shuzhong (grandmother)
- Children: Ying Da; Ying Xiaole
- Parent(s): Ying Qianli; Cai Baozhen
- Education: Tsinghua University
- Occupation: Politician, director, actor, playwright
- Awards: Ramon Magsaysay Award (1998)

Ying Ruocheng (simplified Chinese: 英若诚; traditional Chinese: 英若誠; pinyin: Yīng Ruòchéng; June 21, 1929 – December 27, 2003) was a Chinese actor, director, playwright and vice minister of culture from 1986 to 1990. He first came to the attention of Western audiences for his portrayal of Kublai Khan in the 1982 miniseries Marco Polo. He played the part of the governor of the detention camp in the Bernardo Bertolucci's film The Last Emperor, and the role of the Tibetan Buddhist Lama Norbu in Little Buddha. He also worked as a theater translator, director, and actor for the Beijing People's Art Theatre, particularly for his role as Pockmark Liu in Lao She's Teahouse and as Willy Loman in Death of a Salesman in 1983, directed by Arthur Miller (Ying also translated the script).

== Biography ==
Ying was born in Beijing into a Manchu family. He studied in a church school in Tianjin in his early years, and later graduated from the Department of Foreign Languages of Tsinghua University. He was forced into the provinces to perform manual labor during the Cultural Revolution.

Ying was a Vice Minister of Culture.

He translated the Arthur Miller play Death of a Salesman and in 1983 performed the role of Willy Loman.

He performed the role of a prison official in the 1987 Bertolucci film The Last Emperor and performed as a Tibetan monk in the 1994 Hollywood film Little Buddha.

Ying's autobiography, co-authored by Claire Conceison, "Voices Carry: Behind Bars and Backstage During China's Revolution and Reform" was published posthumously (Lanham: Rowman & Littlefield, 2009).

Ying died on December 27, 2003, at the age of 74.

== Personal life ==
His wife, Wu Shiliang (1928–1987), was a translator, and his son, Ying Da, is also a noted actor. His grandson Ying Rudi is a noted ice hockey player.

== Ancestry ==
His father Ying Qianli (英千里; 1900–1969) was a professor at National Taiwan University and Fu Jen Catholic University. His mother Cai Baozhen (蔡葆真) was president of Beijing Children's Library. His grandfather Ying Lianzhi (英敛之; 1867–1926) was the founder of Takungpao and Fu Jen Catholic University. His grandmother Shuzhong (淑仲) was a member of the Qing dynasty royal family and therefore related to Puyi the last Emperor of China. His maternal grandfather Cai Rukai (蔡儒楷; 1867–1923) was president of National Beiyang University.

4. Ying Lianzhi
2. Ying Qianli
5. Aisin Gioro Shuzhong
1. Ying Ruocheng
6. Cai Rukai
3. Cai Baozhen
7.

== Autobiography ==
- Ying Ruocheng; Claire Conceison (2009). Voices Carry: Behind Bars and Backstage during China's Revolution and Reform. United States.
- Ying Ruocheng; Claire Conceison (2009). 《水流云在：英若诚自传》 (in Chinese). Translated by Zhang Fang. Beijing: Citic Press Corp. ISBN 9787508655437.

== Filmography ==
Year	Title	Role	Notes
1964	Baiqiu'en daifu	Secretary Tong	
1981	Zhi yin	Yuan Shikai	
1982	Cha guan	Liu Ma Zi	
1982-1983	Marco Polo	Kublai Khan	5 episodes
1987	The Last Emperor	Governor of Detention Center	
1993	Little Buddha	Lama Norbu	
