= Ying Qianli =

- 英千里
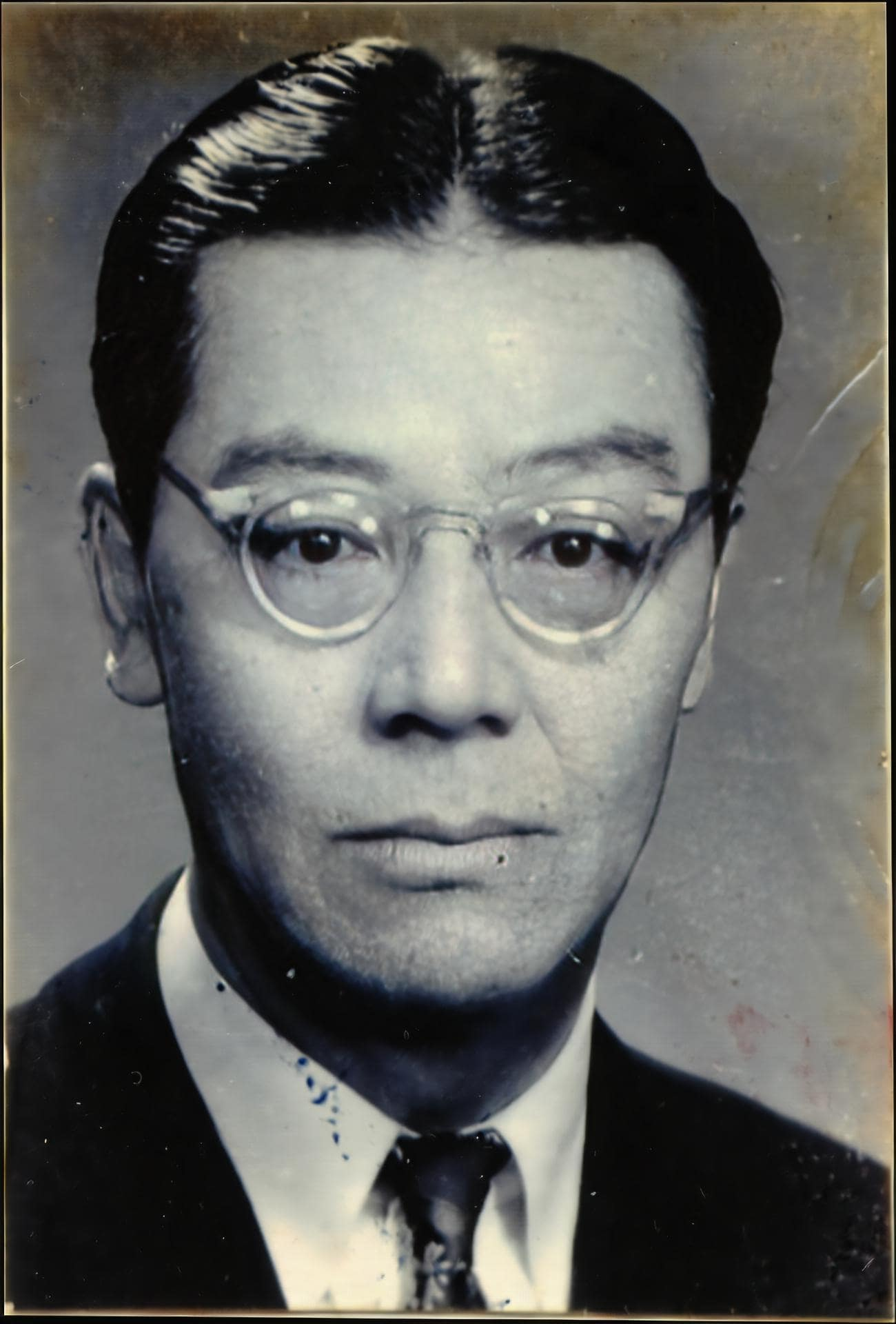
- Ying Qianli
- Born: November 11, 1900; Hanoi, French Indochina
- Died: October 8, 1969 (aged 68); Taipei, Taiwan
- Other name: Ying Jiliang (英骥良)
- Education: University of London
- Occupation: Educator
- Notable work: Logic
- Spouse: Cai Baozhen (m. 1920)
- Children: 9
- Parents: Ying Lianzhi (father); Aisin Gioro Shuzhong (mother)
- Relatives: Ying Ruocheng (son); Ying Da (grandson); Ying Rudi (great-grandson)

Ying Qianli (Chinese: 英千里; 11 November 1900 – 8 October 1969), also known as Ying Jiliang (英骥良; 英驥良), was a Manchu Bannerman, a prominent Catholic layman who devoted himself to education. He was proficient in English, French, Spanish and Latin.

== Biography ==
Ying was born in Hanoi on November 11, 1900, to Ying Lianzhi, founder of Ta Kung Pao and Fu Jen Catholic University, and Aisin Gioro Shuzhong, a member of the Qing dynasty royal family. At the age of 14, Ying was taken to the United Kingdom by Roman Catholic missionary Frédéric-Vincent Lebbe. After graduating from University of London in 1924 he returned to China, he helped his father to establish the Fu Jen Catholic University, where he was a professor since 1927.

During the Second Sino-Japanese War, after the fall of Beijing, Ying and Shen Jianshi secretly founded the Yanwu Society (炎武学社), an Anti-Japanese and national salvation organization which propagandized the idea of resisting Japan and saving the country among young people. He was arrested two times by the Japanese authorities. He was first sentenced to death and later to life imprisonment, which was finally reduced to 15 years of imprisonment. In 1945, Ying was released before the surrender of Japan. At the end of 1948, after receipt of the notice, Ying went to Taiwan with Hu Shih by an assignment plane.

Ying became vice-president of Fu Jen Catholic University. His students included Zheng Peikai, Zhang Xiuya, Gao Tian'en, Han Gongzhen, and Ma Ying-jeou. On October 8, 1969, Ying died of lung cancer at Cardinal Tien Hospital, in Taipei, Taiwan.

== Personal life ==
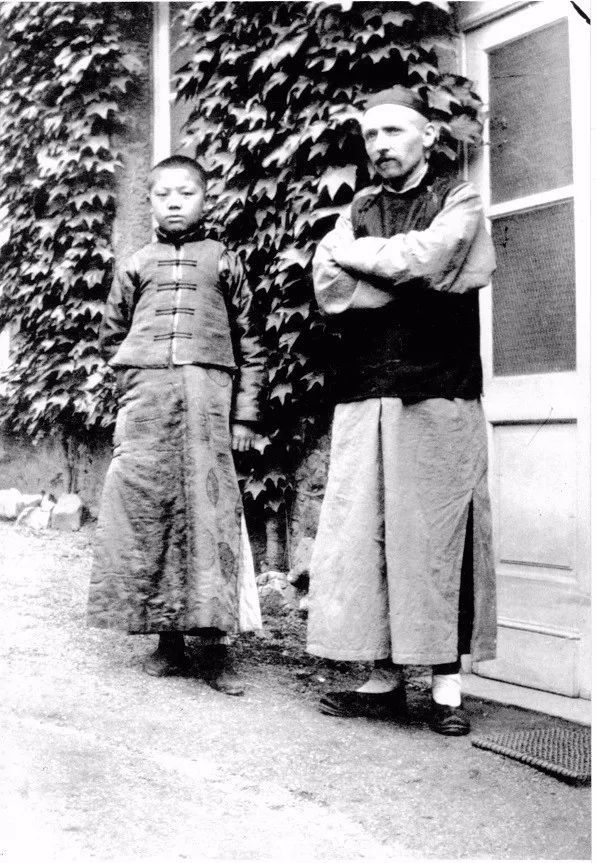
Ying Qian and Frédéric-Vincent Lebbe in Europe in the teenage years.

Ying married Cai Baozhen (蔡葆真), daughter of educator and politician Cai Rukai. The couple had nine children, they children were, in order of birth: Ying Ruoya (英若雅; died prematurely), Ying Ruoqin (英若勤), Ying Ruojing (英若敬; died prematurely), Ying Ruocheng (英若诚), Ying Ruocong (英若聪), Ying Ruocai (英若采), twins Ying Ruoshi (英若识) and Ying Ruozhi (英若智), and Ying Ruoxian (英若娴).

His son Ying Ruocheng was a prominent actor after 1949 and vice minister of culture from 1986 to 1990. His son Ying ruocong is an architect. His daughter Ying Ruocai is a former basketball player. His son Ying Ruoshi was a painter. His son Ying Ruozhi is a hydraulician. His daughter Ying Ruoxian is a professor at Columbia University.

His grandsons Ying Da, Ying Zhuang and Ying Ning are well-known actor, director. His granddaughter Ying Xiaole is a Chinese-American painter. And his great-grandson Ying Rudi is a professional ice hockey player.

== Work ==
- Logic
