= Home with Kids =

Chinese television series

- Home with Kids VCD cover
- Genre: Sitcom
- Written by: Zang Li (臧里) Zang Xi (臧希); Lim Chun-ming (廉春明) Xing Yusen (邢育森)
- Creative director: Li Hong (李洪)
- Starring: Song Dandan; Gao Yalin; Andy Yang (first two seasons); Ning Danlin (latter two seasons); Zhang Yishan; You Haoran
- Opening theme: "Sunshine boy sunshine girl" by TG4
- Country of origin: China
- Original language: Chinese
- No. of seasons: 4
- No. of episodes: 367

Production
- Executive producers: Wu Weimin Huang Rulun; Pan Zhengping; Xu Shengheng; Luo Jiexia; Zhou Meizhen; Liu Shun Fat Di Zhenjiang
- Running time: 20 minutes (approx.)
- Production companies: Sky Ground People Media (天地人传媒); Guangzhou Wei Teng investment

Original release
- Network: Beijing Television
- Release: 12 February 2005 – 10 November 2007

Home with Kids (Chinese: 家有儿女; pinyin: Jiā yǒu érnǚ, literally Home with Sons and Daughters), is a sitcom/drama from Mainland China. There are 4 seasons of Home with Kids, i.e. Home with Kids 1, Home with Kids 2, Home with Kids 3 and Home with Kids 4, which were released respectively in 2004, 2005, 2006 and 2007. It is considered to be an equivalent to Growing Pains and Fresh Off The Boat, both US sitcoms. Unlike most Chinese multi-camera sitcoms, Home With Kids prominently uses child actors as main roles. As a spiritual successor of China's first multi-camera sitcom, I Love My Family, the series also reunites Song Dandan and Wen Xingyu. (Also one of Wen's final roles before his death)

The series has ended with 365 half-hour episodes.

== Premise ==
Xia Donghai, a director of children's drama who has divorced, returns from the U.S. with his young son Xia Yu (commonly known as "Xiǎo Yǔ") and daughter Xia Xue (also known as "Xiǎo Xuě") to start a family with a divorced woman Liu Mei, who has a son, Liu Xing, from her previous marriage. The five live happily in a flat in modern Beijing. The story is evolved around the family member's encounters to various issues in life and their attempts to cope/solve them, and most episodes involve the parents' attempts to act as a good example for their children and teach them to know right from wrong. This family arrangement is atypical for modern Chinese families because of the one child per family policy.

== Characters ==
=== Main characters ===
==== The Xia Family ====
Xia Donghai (夏东海), portrayed by Gao Yalin, is the bespectacled father of Xia Xue and Xia Yu and stepfather of Liu Xing. As a director of children's drama, he is portrayed with a child-friendly personality of being kind, generous, humorous, and easygoing. As someone who has witnessed American education, his ways with the children involves mainly tolerance, understanding and signs of equality. He can also be quite lazy and incompetent at housework or sports. In the second season, he is fired from the spot of director and is recruited as the editor of a children's magazine.

Liu Mei (刘梅), portrayed by Song Dandan, is the mother of Liu Xing and stepmother of Xia Yu and Xia Xue. She is a director of nurses at a hospital and is in charge of the household. Being an adopter of more "traditional" ways of education, she often demonstrates a strong preference to Xia Xue, due to her outstanding school marks and many talents; she often attempts to inflict corporal punishment on her misbehaving children (in particular her own son Liu Xing), but for the most part fails to do so. She is portrayed with a somewhat strong curiosity and slight overzealousness. Moreover, she constantly attempts to understand the three children and help them in any way possible.

Xia Xue (夏雪), portrayed by Andy Yang (in the first two seasons) and Ning Danlin (in the latter two seasons), is the elder daughter of Xia Donghai. She is a typical "smart girl" with excellent grades. She is confident, but also somewhat slightly arrogant, and is often the creator of the more "advanced" issues for her parents. In the first episodes, she distrusts her new stepmother and even tried to "scare her" by "developing" a trend for "puppy love" (which is strongly intolerated by the more "traditional" Chinese parents), but soon finds her very trustworthy. In the third season, she is depressed for not making the marks for Tsinghua University, but soon overcomes her depression.

Liu Xing (刘星), portrayed by Zhang Yishan, is the son of Liu Mei. He is a rather poor student (especially at chemistry), but is quite witty and tactful. The resident troublemaker of the home, he receives most of the blame from his parents. Apart from that, he is sporty (both athletic and acrobatic), chivalrous, and always filled with ideas and advice for others (both good and bad).

Xia Yu (夏雨), portrayed by You Haoran, is the younger son of Xia Donghai. Being raised in America, he is capable of speaking good English (but prefers not to when he moved to Beijing) and has knowledge of many American customs. However, this knowledge is often countered in the episodes by his cluelessness over the usage of some Chinese language features (in particular set phrases and idioms) and Chinese traditions. He follows his stepbrother Liu Xing in his exploits, and will often be the potential troublemaker after Liu Xing. As a running gag, he often proudly announces himself as "the handsome little oversea-Chinese" when meeting strangers.

=== Secondary characters ===
Grandpa or Yeye, portrayed by Wen Xingyu (文兴宇), is Xia Donghai's father. He is interested in things that are for the common good, like saving electricity and saving water. He is a retired sports coach and is often very strict. Grandma calls him a fascist. Named Xia Xiang. As Wen died of lung cancer in 2007, the character ceases to appear in the series.

Grandma or Laolao, portrayed by Sun Guitian (孙桂田), is Liu Mei's mother. She pampers and spoils her grandchildren and spare them from any hardships and inconveniences. She dislikes Grandpa; she always seeks to quarrel with him.

Hu Yitong (胡一统), portrayed by Ma Shuliang (马书良), is Liu Xing's hapless biological father. He often drops by unannounced, to the consternation of his ex-wife Liu Mei.

Mary or Mǎlì (玛丽), portrayed by Hei Mei (戚慧) (seasons 1–2) and Fu Yujia (傅羽佳) (season 4), is the biological mother of Xia Xue and Xia Yu. She likes to spoil them and blames Xia Donghai and Liu Mei whenever the children are upset. It is implied that she is wealthy, as she owns a BMW and carries around expensive purses.

Feifei (菲菲), portrayed by Ran Qian (冉倩), is Xia Donghai's cousin.

Shubiao "Mouse" (鼠标), portrayed by Zhang Yiwen, is Liu Xing's good friend. His parents are especially strict. His real name is Lin Ning (林宁)

Jianpan "Keyboard" (键盘), portrayed by Sheng Shao, is Liu Xing's other good friend. Named Sheng Chao.

Duoduo (朵朵), portrayed by Duan Liyang (段丽阳), is Xia Yu's close friend.

"Erpang" (二胖), portrayed by Zhai Zhenjing, is Xia Yu's friend. His father is called in the screenplay Laogao (老高)

=== Other characters ===
Character	Actors
Wild Boy	Kyle Ma
Duoduo's father	Han Tongsheng
Lin Ning	Zhang Yiwen
Shang Xishan	Ju Yaojie
Da Jun	Yin Hang
Jiaojiao	Lu Yuemeng
Xue's mate in S1E10	Zhang Wenhao
Patient's relatives in S1E12	Hu Sha
Patient's relatives in S1E12	Yan Jun
Teacher Wu	Wu Xu
Chen Xiaolan	Zhang Haiyan
Cameraman in S1E17	Fei Ming
Journalist in S1E17, Leader of Jiannaole Corporation	Gao Jian
Mi Lan	Chen Luyao
Chun Hua	Du Ninglin
Miss Ma	Hao Yang
Waihou	September Zhang
Old Wu	Mo Qi
Lift girl in S1E21	Zhou Lu
Little Liu	Zhang Xinhua
Old Wang	Luan Zuxun
Guard in S1E22	Chen Feng
Lift girl's boyfriend	Xu Yaohui
Policemen in S1E22	Zhang Hao
Policemen in S1E22	Zhang Ke
Old Gao	Zhang Jinhai
Lin Dafei	Tian Xiaobing
Ning's mother	Liu Yan
Party decorator in S1E29	Lu Dongchang
Cook in S1E29	Wang Peng
Lin Fan	Guo Xu
Niu's uncle	Liu Jinshan
Donghai's colleague in S1E35	Wang Zhiming
Physics teacher	Zhao Yuchen
Ma Lala	Chen Chuang
Ma Houpao	Zhao Tieren
Boss Wang	Zhang Shaorong
Cousin of the farmer in S1E44	Wang Shiyuan
Cousin in law of the farmer in S1E44	Guo Shaoxiong
Farmer in S1E44	Wang Qingyuan
Song Yang	Yang Qing
Fang Qianqian	Alice Chan
Deliverer in S1E45	Yang Fengning
Mary	Qi Hui
Mary's assistant	Zhang Bin
Jin Gang	Cao Xuefei
Jin Gang's mother	Sun Mengquan
Gong Hai	Li Xiaofan
Xing's victim's grandfather in S1E56	Meng Junquan
Employees of Weicai Press in S1E57	Yang Yiming
Employees of Weicai Press in S1E57	Li Xiaofeng
Lawyer in S1E58	Chu Jian
Violin teacher in S1E60	Xia Xin
Uncle Ning	Zhou Mingshan
Wei Zheng	Solo Wang
Yaling	Ning Boyuan
Zhou Zheng	Li Yonggui
Stationer in S1E65	Miao Qiang
Xing's classmate in S1E66	Chen Qingxin
Mingyang	You Mingyang
Old Wu's son	Ning Wentong
Aunt Daming	Xia Lixin
Huanhuan	Bai-Xiao Yingnan
Su Jie	Chen Chen
Teacher Fang	Li Ye
Teacher Yuan	Wang Zhuo
Aunt Feifei	Ran Qian
Feng	Jiang Chao
Huang Feihong	Hou Xiang
Lingling's father	Bao Dazhi
Lingling's mother	Jing Fengling
Lingling	Liu Yuzhe
Rongrong	Xin Xinuo
Xing's classmate in S1E83	Chen Yi'an
Xing's classmates in S1E85	Wu Xiaohuo
Employee of Jiannaole Corporation	Yang Yi
Journalist in S1E87	Vivi Wang
Robbed man in S1E88	Sun Jinliang
Sun Zhiwei	Gu Jin
Xing's construction teacher in S1E90	Li Chunpeng
Qianqian's father	Wang Xinwu
Qianqian's mother	Hu Ningfang
Qianqian	Emily Chen
Brother of Mute Angel	Pang Hai
Sister of Mute Angel	Hu Xin
Yu's Headmaster	Ma Yuhong
Yu Xiaohong	Lu Xiao
Liu Weiwei	Zhou Ti
Zhang Nong
Zhenr	Xu Di
Congcong	Cui Binbin
Zhang Chao	Zhang Tu

== Production ==
Planning	Master planning	Yang Weiguang
Planning	Master planning	Zhang Linshu
Planning	Master planning	Liu Min
Planning	Li Hong	
Planning	Yang Ping	
Planning	Li Jianhong	
Publishers	Wu Weimin	
Publishers	Huang Rulun	
Publishers	Pan Zhengping	
Publishers	Xu Shengheng	
Artistic adviser	Li Zhun	
Scenario co-ordination	Li Jianhong	
Scenario co-ordination	Zang Li	
Scenario co-ordination	Yuan Zhenjiang	
Theme song	Music	Lei Lei
Theme song	Lyrics	Yang Xuanjia
Theme song	Singers	TG4
Theme song	Music playing	China Symphony Orchestra
Theme song	MIDI	Ji-Ang He
Theme song	Post production	Wang Wei
Theme song	Post production	Lin Hongjun
Art designing	Zhang Hui	
Art designers	Li Bin	
Art designers	Assistant	Xiang Xiaobin
Producers	Yin Lianchuang	
Producers	Master producers	Yang Weiguang
Producers	Master producers	Zhang Xiao'ai
Production director	Wang Jia	
Film producer	Li Hong	
Directors	Lin Cong	
Directors	Assistant director	Chen Yanping
Directors	Assistant director	Liang Shaohua
Screenwriters	S1E1-4,7,8,12,15,18,25,27,28,31,33,34,49-51,53,56,67,75,76,79-81,83,89,91,95,96,99,100	Zang Xi
Screenwriters	S1E1-4,12,15,18,25,27,28,31,33,34,49,50,56,67,75,76,79-81,85,89,91,95,96,99	Zang Li
Screenwriters	S1E3,19,20,32,47,54,57,69,70,78,92,97	Li Jianhong
Screenwriters	S1E9,16,29,44,46,52,60-62,71,78,86	Xing Yusen
Screenwriters	S1E17,59,73	Qiu Xiangdong
Screenwriters	S1E6,12-14,32,36,74,83,87,93	Fei Ming
Screenwriters	S1E24,48,52,58,88,94	Huang Gou
Screenwriters	S1E5,10,21,22,35,42,69,77,82,84,90	Gao Chong
Screenwriters	S1E7,20,41,45,53,55,63,64,72,98	Yang Jinfeng
Screenwriters	S1E11,30,37,43,47,68	Huang Kezhong
Screenwriters	S1E8,51	Hu Lu
Screenwriters	S1E15,23	Yi Dong
Screenwriters	S1E19,39,40	Dong Tao
Screenwriters	S1E23	Yi Xuan
Screenwriters	S1E26,97	Liu Fei
Screenwriters	S1E38,65	Li Zongmin
Screenwriters	S1E39,40	Du Wei
Screenwriters	S1E41,55,72,98	Qu Ziyang
Screenwriters	S1E63	Luo Jianwen
Screenwriters	S1E66	Zhang Pingxi
Screenwriters	S1E70,84,85	Shao Haowen
	S1E100	Li Lin
Portrait director	Qi Xiaohui	
Portrait director	Wu Yongbao	
Log	Liang Shaohua	
Production producer	Chen Yanping	
Site producer	Li Bingyin	
Stage management	Chairman	Yang Ping
Stage management	Assistant	Li Cheng
Stage management	Xiang Xiaobin	
Stage management	Lu Yunchao	
Stage management	Tian Feng	
Stage management	Yang Yanhui	
Stage management	Zhang Heng	
Stage management	Yi Lijun	
Stage management	Pan Linyi	
Cameramen	Zhou Haibo	
Cameramen	Yang Dengfeng	
Cameramen	Tang Ye	
Cameramen	Zhang Yan	
Cameramen	Ji Yuan	
Fancy	Hu Junhong	
Fancy	Setsen	
Clothing	Wang Jing	
Clothing	Assistant	Gao Tiantian
Clothing	Assistant	Setsen
Clothing	Song Dandan's	Guangzhou Emao Fashion
Prop	Cai Baojian	
Prop	Xiang Xiaobin	
Prop	Assistant	Meng Xianchun
Lights	Zhang Wei	
Lights	Assistants	Zhou Honglu
Lights	Assistants	Chen Junzhou
Recording	Zheng Zhi	
Recording	Assistants	Hui Ziqiang
Recording	Assistants	Liu Sheng
Title & tail	Beijing TTV Jiahua cultural transmission Co., Ltd	
Site co-ordination	Wang Jia	
Site co-ordination	Li Cheng	
Sponsors	Beijing Blueweit advertisement Co., Ltd	
Sponsors	Tsinghua Unigroup	
Sponsors	Rossini Watch industry	
Sponsors	Tianjin Cola Coa food Co., Lmt	
Sponsors	Beijing Sihai Tiandi digital	
Sponsors	Sina Wireless	
Sponsors	Tianlang Orchestra	
Joint production	CTAA Film & Television Centre	
Joint production	Beijing TV	
Joint production	CTV Mstartv culture media Co., Ltd	
Joint production	Empark Grand Group Co., Ltd	
Joint production	Beijing Jiadun investment Co., Ltd	
Joint production	Beijing Runsheng investmental management Co., Ltd	

== Awards ==
In 2006, the sitcom won an Award for Outstanding Long-Form Television Series on the 23rd China TV Golden Eagle Awards.
