= Ying Lianzhi =

Chinese Catholic journalist

- 英敛之
- Born: November 23, 1867; Wanping, Zhili, Qing Empire
- Died: March 2, 1926 (aged 58); Peking, Republic of China
- Other names: Ying Hua; Anjian Zhaizhu; Wansong Yeren
- Education: Private
- Occupations: Journalist, educator
- Notable credit: Founder of Ta Kung Pao
- Spouse: Aisin Gioro Shuzhong
- Children: Ying Qianli
- Relatives: Ying Ruocheng; Ying Da; Ying Rudi

Ying Lianzhi (simplified Chinese: 英敛之; traditional Chinese: 英斂之; pinyin: Yīng Liǎnzhī; November 23, 1867 – March 2, 1926), also known as Ying Hua (Chinese: 英華), was a Manchu Bannerman, a prominent Catholic layman who agitated for church reform, founder of the prominent newspaper Ta Kung Pao, and instrumental in founding The Catholic University of Peking.

== Biography ==
From the Manchu Hešeri clan, although his family was not rich and he had no formal schooling, Ying became well versed in the Confucian Classics as a child. After his fiancé was nursed to health by the Sisters of Charity at a Catholic hospital in Beijing, Ying became interested in the writings of Matteo Ricci and several of scholars he converted to Christianity in the late Ming dynasty. These writers convinced Ying that Confucianism and Christianity, Chinese culture and Western culture, were essentially complementary with each other. Other influences on Ying's conversion included his study of a Chinese translation of Summa Theologica by Thomas Aquinas and the works of Giulio Alenio.

Ying sympathized with the constitutional reform movements in China around the late 1800s and early 1900s.

Ying was the founding editor of the Ta Kung Pao (also known as L'Impartial) in 1902. The paper's 1902 criticism of the foreign forces of the Eight-Nation Alliance (which had established posts in Tianjin following the Boxer War) resulted in French authorities issuing fines against the paper; Ying moved its operations from the French concession to the Japanese concession. Ying edited the paper for the next decade, and his extensive writings were influential both for their support of liberal politics and their use of the vernacular language. It is regarded as one of the "Four Great Papers of Republican Era."

In 1905, Ying obtained permission from the Qing imperial family to start a school at Jingyi Park, which was part of the imperial retreat west of Beijing in the Xiangshan hills. Its mission was "to develop a group of Catholic young men, who would be as cultured and well-education as any other class or circle in China, and whose conversation would redound to the glory of Holy Mother Church and to the good of their native country." Ying financed the Academy until 1918 when it ran out of funds and had to stop operating.

Ying was an early advocate of Catholic education in China, along with Ma Xiangbo.

After the Revolution of 1911, he turned his attention to Catholic education, founding the Fu-jen School for girls. Ying and his friends the reformist priest Vincent Lebbe and the Catholic layman Ma Xiangbo had become increasingly frustrated and resentful over the control of the Chinese Catholic Church and all Catholics in China exercised by the French government and French priests, who constituted 70% of the clergy in China. They called for the Church in China to be controlled by Chinese priests appointed by the Vatican rather than French ones, who blocked the reform efforts of the Pope.

During the 1910s, Ying worked closely with Lebbe in the Tianjin Catholic community, and in support of Lebbe's Catholic newspaper, Yishibao.

In 1912, the Republic of China banned Ta Kung Pao after it criticised Yuan Shikai. Ying responded by distributing the paper free of charge.

In 1912, Ying was appointed the lay editor of the first Chinese Catholic weekly newspaper, Guang Yi Lu, by Lebbe.

Lebbe arranged for an essay of Ying's to be translated into French and sent to Rome. Ying frankly explained that the chauvinism and disdain for Chinese among the French clergy in China was extremely demoralizing for Chinese priests. Ying's critical voice was a major factor in the decision of Pope Benedict XV to direct the founding of a Catholic university, Fujen University, in Beijing. Ying took responsibility for much of the organization and start-up of the university, which opened in 1925. He died of cancer on 2 March 1926 in Beijing.

== Views ==
Ying appreciated the intellectual heritage of Catholicism and lamented that that the Catholic Church in China had largely abandoned scholarly efforts in the country after the Chinese Rites controversy.

Ying believed that the interference of the European Catholic country's civil authorities in China was a major reason for the religion's lack of efficacy as a social or moral force in China.

== Personal life ==
Growing up, Ying was skilled athletically, including in archery, swordsmanship, and horseback riding.

Ying married Shuzhong (淑仲), a member of the Qing dynasty royal family. Ying Hua's son, Ying Qianli, was an active lay leader in the Catholic Church during the early Republican era. His grandson, Ying Ruocheng, was a prominent actor after 1949 and China's vice minister of culture from 1986 to 1990. His great-grandson, Ying Da, is a prominent actor, director, talk show host, and television show creator in Beijing. His great-great-grandson, Rudi Ying, is a professional ice hockey player.
