= Yang Gang (journalist) =

Chinese journalist, novelist, and translator

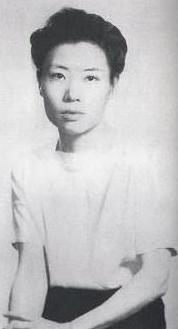
Yang Gang in 1945

Yang Gang (Chinese: 杨刚; pinyin: Yáng Gāng; 1905 – 7 October 1957), also known as Yang Bin (杨缤), was a Chinese journalist, novelist, and translator. She gained prominence reporting for the influential newspaper Ta Kung Pao during the Second Sino-Japanese War, and was considered one of the top four female journalists in China. After the Chinese Communist Revolution, she served as Premier Zhou Enlai's secretary and later Deputy Chief Editor of the People's Daily. She committed suicide in October 1957, after being forced to persecute her colleagues during the Anti-Rightist Campaign, although the exact reason for her suicide remains undetermined.

== Early life and education ==
Yang was born in Pingxiang, Jiangxi province, one of 11 children in a family of Xiantao, Hubei ancestry. Her father was a high-ranking politician who served as governor of Jiangxi and Hubei provinces. Her name at birth was Yang Jizheng (杨季征).

In 1922 Yang attended Baoling Girls' School in Nanchang, an American missionary school. In 1927 she entered Yenching University in Beijing, studying English literature. In Beijing she joined the Chinese Communist Party (CCP), and met Zheng Kan (郑侃), a student at Peking University. After graduating from university, Yang married Zheng Kan and gave birth to a daughter Zheng Guangdi. She quit the CCP due to a dispute with her superior but continued to participate in underground communist activities.

== Career ==
In 1933, Yang moved to Shanghai, where she joined the League of Left-Wing Writers and befriended American journalist Agnes Smedley. Later that year she returned to Yenching University at the invitation of Edgar Snow, who translated one of Yang's novels into English. In 1935 Yang Gang translated Jane Austen's novel Pride and Prejudice into Chinese, which was published by the Commercial Press. In 1936, Yang and her husband worked together for the Popular Knowledge magazine (大众知识) run by the historian Gu Jiegang.

After the Marco Polo Bridge Incident in 1937 and the Japanese invasion of China, Yang Gang rejoined the CCP and the anti-Japanese resistance. Due to differences between Yang and her husband, the couple divorced. Yang joined the influential newspaper Ta Kung Pao, which retreated south to Hong Kong, while Zheng Kan went to Fujian province. In 1943, Zheng was killed in a Japanese bombing raid in Yong'an, Fujian.

In Hong Kong, Yang worked as a reporter for the Ta Kung Pao. After Hong Kong also fell to the Japanese in 1941, Yang evacuated with the newspaper to Guilin, Guangxi. In 1944 she was sent by the newspaper to the United States as its correspondent, until she returned to China in 1948. From 1945 to 1947 she enrolled at Radcliffe College of Harvard University, studying art. During her time in America she wrote an autobiographical novel called Daughter in English as well as creating reports on contemporary American life. These reports covered subjects including the search for undercover communists and racism, and were published as a collection in 1951.

After the founding of the People's Republic of China in 1949, Yang worked as Premier Zhou Enlai's secretary and became Deputy Chief Editor of the People's Daily in 1955.

== Suicide ==
When the Anti-Rightist Campaign began in 1957, Yang Gang was appointed the number three leader of the "Anti-Rightist Leadership Group" of the People's Daily. She was forced to participate in the persecution of many of her colleagues and friends who had been labelled "rightists". On October 7, Yang committed suicide by taking an overdose of sleeping pills. The reason for her suicide is undetermined. According to Hu Qiaomu, it was because she lost a notebook where she recorded her thoughts which she feared would lead to her being sought by the Anti-Rightist Campaign. According to John King Fairbank, who knew her personally, she committed suicide because of a serious injury sustained in a car accident. This view is disputed by Yang's colleagues and personal friends Xiao Qian and Ye Yao, who noted that her suicide occurred two days after she took part in the criticism session of the famous woman writer Ding Ling, and that she had just been stripped of her status as a representative to the National People's Congress, along with Feng Xuefeng, which made headline news in October 1957.

== Legacy ==
A first draft of Yang Gang's autobiographical novel Daughter was published in 1988 by the Beijing Foreign Languages service in English, and a Chinese translation by the People's Publishing House was published under the title Tiaozhan.
