= Follow Me My Queen =

- 女神跟我走
- Directed by: Liu Xin
- Release date: May 1, 2015
- Running time: 95 minutes
- Country: China
- Language: Mandarin
- Box office: CN¥270,000 (China)

Follow Me My Queen (Chinese: 女神跟我走) is a 2015 Chinese romantic comedy film directed by Liu Xin. It was released on May 1, 2015, in China.

== Cast ==
- Lin Yongjian
- Han Xue
- Song Yunhao
- Song Dandan
- Li Jingjing

== Reception ==
By May 8, 2015, the film had grossed CN¥270,000 at the Chinese box office.
