= 2017 IIHF World Championship Division II =

Tournament details
- Host countries: Romania; New Zealand
- Venue: 2 (in 2 host cities)
- Dates: 3–9 April (Group A); 4–10 April (Group B)
- Teams: 12

The 2017 IIHF World Championship Division II was an international ice hockey tournament run by the Zurich, Switzerland-based International Ice Hockey Federation. Group A was contested in Galati, Romania from 3 to 9 April 2017 and Group B in Auckland, New Zealand from 4 to 10 April 2017.

== Bids ==
There were three official bids to host Group A Championships.

- Iceland
  - Reykjavík

Iceland had previously hosted these championships in 2015, in Reykjavík.

- Romania
  - Galați

Romania had previously hosted these championships twice, the 2001 edition in Bucharest, and again in 2008, in Miercurea Ciuc. The proposed arena was the Galați Skating Rink.

- Serbia
  - Belgrade or Novi Sad

Serbia has hosted the championships a number of times. Belgrade hosted twice, in 2005 and 2014, whilst Novi Sad hosted in 2009. In addition, Novi Sad also played host to the competition in 2002 whilst known as Serbia and Montenegro.

The decision on hosts was made on May 21, 2016. The bid from Romania gained a majority vote and as a result Galati will host the competition.

There were also two official bids to host Group B Championships.

- New Zealand
  - Auckland

New Zealand had previously hosted these championships in 2006. The proposed arena was Paradice Botany Downs.

- Turkey
  - Ankara

Turkey had previously hosted these championships in 2013, in İzmit.

The decision on hosts was made on May 21, 2016. The bid from New Zealand received the majority of the votes, and as a result Auckland will host the competition.

== Venues ==
Group A	Group B
Galați	Auckland
Galați Skating Rink; Capacity: 5,000	Paradice Botany Downs; Capacity: 400

== Group A tournament ==
2017 IIHF World Championship Division II A

Tournament details
- Host country: Romania
- Venue: 1 (in 1 host city)
- Dates: 3–9 April
- Teams: 6

Tournament statistics
- Games played: 15
- Goals scored: 103 (6.87 per game)
- Attendance: 14,910 (994 per game)
- Scoring leader: (Romania) Ede Mihály (9 points)

Official website
- IIHF.com

=== Participants ===
Team	Qualification
Romania	Host, placed 6th in Division I B last year and were relegated.
Spain	Placed 2nd in Division II A last year.
Belgium	Placed 3rd in Division II A last year.
Serbia	Placed 4th in Division II A last year.
Iceland	Placed 5th in Division II A last year.
Australia	Placed 1st in Division II B last year and were promoted.

=== Match officials ===
4 referees and 7 linesmen were selected for the tournament.

Referees

- (Finland) Aaro Brännare
- (Italy) Andrea Moschen
- (Belarus) Andrei Shrubok
- (Netherlands) Ramon Sterkens

Linesmen

- (Netherlands) Lodewyk Beelen
- (Germany) Markus Eberl
- (Lithuania) Benas Jakšys
- (Norway) Stian Løsnesløkken
- (Romania) István Máthé
- (Romania) Levente-Szilard Siko
- (Kazakhstan) Vladimir Yefremov

=== Standings ===
Pos	Team	Pld	W	OTW	OTL	L	GF	GA	GD	Pts	Qualification or relegation
1	Romania (H, P)	5	4	0	0	1	24	5	+19	12	Promoted to Division I B
2	Australia	5	3	1	0	1	16	13	+3	11	
3	Serbia	5	2	0	2	1	23	15	+8	8	
4	Belgium	5	2	0	0	3	17	27	−10	6 (Note: Iceland 3–9 Belgium)	
5	Iceland	5	2	0	0	3	10	20	−10	6	
6	Spain (R)	5	0	1	0	4	13	23	−10	2	Relegation to Division II B

Source: IIHF
Rules for classification: 1) points; 2) head-to-head points; 3) head-to-head goal difference; 4) head-to-head number of goals scored; 5) result against closest best-ranked team outside tied teams; 6) result against second-best ranked team outside tied teams; 7) seeding before tournament.
(H) Host; (P) Promoted; (R) Relegated

=== Results ===
All times are local (UTC+3).

3 April 2017; 13:00	Australia	4–3 OT (1–1, 0–1, 2–1); OT: (1–0)	Serbia	Galați Skating Rink, Galați; Attendance: 250

Game reference

Anthony Kimlin
Goalies
Arsenije Ranković
Referee:
(Netherlands) Ramon Sterkens
Linesmen:
(Romania) Levente-Szilard Siko
(Kazakhstan) Vladimir Yefremov

Darge (Tesarik) – 07:28	1–0
	1–1	14:47 – Luković (Milovanović, Crnogorac) (PP2)
	1–2	31:33 – Milovanović (Popravko, Crnogorac)
Powell (Humphries) – 41:20	2–2
Rezek (Malloy, Todd) (PP) – 41:55	3–2
	3–3	55:26 – Sretoviċ (Popravko, Đumić)
Rezek (L. Webster, Woodman) (PP) – 61:17	4–3

16 min
Penalties
10 min
29
Shots
44

3 April 2017; 16:30	Spain	2–3 (1–2, 1–1, 0–0)	Iceland	Galați Skating Rink, Galați; Attendance: 190

Game reference

Ignacio García
Goalies
Dennis Hedström
Referee:
(Finland) Aaro Brannare
Linesmen:
(Germany) Markus Eberl
(Romania) István Máthé

	0–1	00:07 – Maack (Björnsson)
Boronat (Solórzano) – 04:48	1–1
	1–2	07:20 – Leifsson (PP)
González (A. García, Quevedo) (PP) – 37:09	2–2
	2–3	38:59 – Pålsson (Maack, R. Hedström)

4 min
Penalties
12 min
41
Shots
22

3 April 2017; 20:00	Belgium	1–9 (1–2, 0–3, 0–4)	Romania	Galați Skating Rink, Galați; Attendance: 2,230

Game reference

Arthur Legrand
Goalies
Zoltán Tőke
Ottó Onodi
Referee:
(Belarus) Andrei Shrubok
Linesmen:
(Netherlands) Lodewyk Beelen
(Norway) Stian Losneslokken

Paulus (V. Morgan, M. Morgan) – 05:29	1–0
	1–1	11:23 – Mihály (Gliga, Fodor)
	1–2	19:42 – Mihály (Gliga, Nagy)
	1–3	23:11 – Mihály (M. Bíró, Georgescu) (PP)
	1–4	27:40 – Irimia (M. Bíró, O. Bíró) (PP)
	1–5	34:34 – Mihály (Fodor)
	1–6	43:17 – Fodor (Gliga)
	1–7	47:30 – Mihály (Gliga, S. Rokaly)
	1–8	54:36 – Salló (G. Bíró, M. Bíró)
	1–9	58:21 – Bocu (Gecse, Georgescu)

12 min
Penalties
4 min
21
Shots
39

4 April 2017; 13:00	Iceland	2–3 (0–1, 2–1, 0–1)	Australia	Galați Skating Rink, Galați; Attendance: 250

Game reference

Dennis Hedström
Goalies
Anthony Kimlin
Referee:
(Finland) Aaro Brannare
Linesmen:
(Lithuania) Benas Jakšys
(Romania) István Máthé

	0–1	14:23 – Woodman (Powell, Humphries) (PP)
	0–2	30:39 – Darge (L. Webster)
R. Hedström (Maack, Ingason) – 32:44	1–2
Ingason (Björnsson) (PP) – 36:50	2–2
	2–3	43:00 – Baranzelli (Powell, Rezek) (PP)

14 min
Penalties
16 min
30
Shots
31

4 April 2017; 16:30	Spain	3–5 (0–1, 0–2, 3–2)	Belgium	Galați Skating Rink, Galați; Attendance: 210

Game reference

Ignacio García
Goalies
Jean Cornelis
Referee:
(Italy) Andrea Moschen
Linesmen:
(Netherlands) Lodewyk Beelen
(Romania) Levente-Szilard Siko

	0–1	07:46 – B. Kolodziejczyk (M. Morgan, V. Morgan)
	0–2	21:26 – B. Kolodziejczyk (De Smet, Pellegrims)
	0–3	25:06 – M. Morgan (V. Morgan) (SH)
	0–4	41:07 – Distate (B. Kolodziejczyk, Paulus) (PP)
Rubio (García-Arias) – 52:51	1–4
	1–5	56:53 – Bremer (Pellegrims) (PP)
Puyuelo (Solórzano, Boronat) (PP) – 57:58	2–5
Brabo (Boronat, Paul) (SH) – 59:58	3–5

20 min
Penalties
24 min
24
Shots
32

4 April 2017; 20:00	Romania	4–1 (2–0, 0–1, 2–0)	Serbia	Galați Skating Rink, Galați; Attendance: 2,100

Game reference

Zoltán Tőke
Goalies
Arsenije Ranković
Referee:
(Netherlands) Ramon Sterkens
Linesmen:
(Germany) Markus Eberl
(Kazakhstan) Vladimir Yefremov

Flinta (Nagy, M. Bíró) – 06:47	1–0
Georgescu (Bocu, Irimia) – 16:05	2–0
	2–1	36:10 – Filipović (Milovanović, Bibić)
M. Bíró (Peter) – 40:37	3–1
Flinta (Georgescu, N. Rokaly) – 44:24	4–1

12 min
Penalties
18 min
40
Shots
19

6 April 2017; 13:00	Belgium	2–9 (1–2, 0–2, 1–5)	Serbia	Galați Skating Rink, Galați; Attendance: 100

Game reference

Jean Cornelis
Goalies
Arsenije Ranković
Referee:
(Belarus) Andrei Shrubok
Linesmen:
(Romania) István Máthé
(Romania) Levente-Szilard Siko

	0–1	01:07 – Sretović
	0–2	07:25 – Popravko (Sretović)
Paulus (PP) – 16:18	1–2
	1–3	23:55 – Đumić (Milovanović)
	1–4	28:29 – Vučurević (Luković, Crnogorac) (PP)
	1–5	41:09 – Vučurević (Sretović, Crnogorac)
	1–6	44:02 – Sabados (Vučurević, Sretović)
B. Kolodziejczyk (M. Morgan) – 50:04	2–6
	2–7	53:13 – Luković (Vučurević) (PP)
	2–8	54:44 – Ogrizović (Brkušanin)
	2–9	59:22 – Sretović (Vučurević) (SH)

8 min
Penalties
10 min
26
Shots
37

6 April 2017; 16:30	Spain	3–5 (1–2, 0–1, 2–2)	Australia	Galați Skating Rink, Galați; Attendance: 300

Game reference

Ignacio García
Goalies
Anthony Kimlin
Referee:
(Netherlands) Ramon Sterkens
Linesmen:
(Norway) Stian Losneslokken
(Kazakhstan) Vladimir Yefremov

	0–1	00:44 – Rezek (L. Webster)
Carbonell (Quevedo, Betran) (PP) – 04:31	1–1
	1–2	06:52 – Taylor (Darge, Carpenter)
	1–3	21:59 – Baranzelli (Darge, Powell) (PP)
	1–4	40:24 – Rezek (Malloy, L. Webster)
Carbonell (Betran, Quevedo) (PP) – 50:59	2–4
Rubio (Quevedo, Betran) (PP) – 58:32	3–4
	3–5	59:11 – Taylor (ENG)

6 min
Penalties
14 min
29
Shots
26

6 April 2017; 20:00	Romania	0–2 (0–0, 0–1, 0–1)	Iceland	Galați Skating Rink, Galați; Attendance: 2,600

Game reference
Zoltán Tőke	Goalies	Dennis Hedström	Referee: (Italy) Andrea Moschen; Linesmen: (Netherlands) Lodewyk Beelen (Lithuania) Benas Jakšys
0–1 / 25:27 – Kristinsson (Ólafsson); 0–2 / 54:07 – Knútsson (R. Hedström, Pålsson)			Referee: (Italy) Andrea Moschen; Linesmen: (Netherlands) Lodewyk Beelen (Lithuania) Benas Jakšys
8 min	Penalties	16 min	Referee: (Italy) Andrea Moschen; Linesmen: (Netherlands) Lodewyk Beelen (Lithuania) Benas Jakšys
41	Shots	21	Referee: (Italy) Andrea Moschen; Linesmen: (Netherlands) Lodewyk Beelen (Lithuania) Benas Jakšys

7 April 2017; 13:00	Serbia	4–5 OT (0–3, 2–1, 2–0); OT: (0–1)	Spain	Galați Skating Rink, Galați; Attendance: 130

Game reference

Arsenije Ranković
Goalies
Ignacio García
Referee:
(Italy) Andrea Moschen
Linesmen:
(Netherlands) Lodewyk Beelen
(Germany) Markus Eberl

	0–1	04:59 – Betran (Quevedo, Rubio)
	0–2	13:26 – Baldris (Puyuelo, Rubio)
	0–3	18:56 – Boronat (Quevedo, Carbonell)
Đumić (Bibić) – 22:14	1–3
	1–4	29:11 – Fuentes (Puyuelo) (PP)
Ogrizović (Ristić) – 39:14	2–4
Filipović (Crnogorac, Sretoviċ) – 44:58	3–4
Milovanović (Zwick, Filipović) – 55:44	4–4
	4–5	63:15 – González (Brabo, Fuentes)

22 min
Penalties
6 min
35
Shots
33

7 April 2017; 16:30	Iceland	3–9 (1–3, 2–4, 0–2)	Belgium	Galați Skating Rink, Galați; Attendance: 200

Game reference

Arthur Legrand
Goalies
Dennis Hedström
Snorri Sigurbergsson
Referee:
(Belarus) Andrei Shrubok
Linesmen:
(Lithuania) Benas Jakšys
(Kazakhstan) Vladimir Yefremov

	0–1	04:03 – V. Morgan (M. Morgan, Pellegrims)
	0–2	09:21 – Neven (Bremer, De Smet) (PP)
	0–3	15:17 – M. Morgan (V. Morgan) (SH)
R. Hedström (Pålsson, Björnsson) – 17:37	1–3
Mikaelsson (Pålsson) (PP) – 25:50	2–3
Maack (Ingason) – 26:24	3–3
	3–4	27:31 – Van den Bogaert (B. Kolodziejczyk, De Smet)
	3–5	31:46 – Pellegrims (M. Morgan, Distate) (PP)
	3–6	34:58 – V. Morgan (M. Morgan)
	3–7	35:21 – De Smet (Van den Bogaert, B. Kolodziejczyk)
	3–8	44:01 – De Smet (PS)
	3–9	55:14 – V. Morgan (M. Morgan) (SH)

16 min
Penalties
14 min
25
Shots
31

7 April 2017; 20:00	Australia	1–5 (1–1, 0–2, 0–2)	Romania	Galați Skating Rink, Galați; Attendance: 2,800

Game reference

Anthony Kimlin
Goalies
Zoltán Tőke
Referee:
(Finland) Aaro Brannare
Linesmen:
(Lithuania) Benas Jakšys
(Kazakhstan) Vladimir Yefremov

Rezek (L. Webster, Malloy) (PP) – 17:14	1–0
	1–1	17:44 – S. Rokaly (Gecse, N. Rokaly)
	1–2	28:36 – Nagy (Mihály, Gliga)
	1–3	37:35 – M. Bíró (Georgescu, Bors) (PP)
	1–4	51:11 – Mihály (Gliga, Nagy) (PP)
	1–5	56:29 – Fodor (Gliga, Nagy)

43 min
Penalties
39 min
16
Shots
27

9 April 2017; 13:00	Belgium	0–3 (0–1, 0–1, 0–1)	Australia	Galați Skating Rink, Galați; Attendance: 150

Game reference

Arthur Legrand
Goalies
Anthony Kimlin
Referee:
(Belarus) Andrei Shrubok
Linesmen:
(Norway) Stian Losneslokken
(Romania) István Máthé

0–1	15:51 – Todd (Cliff, L. Webster)
0–2	22:27 – Wong (Tesarik, Humphries)
0–3	45:42 – Todd (L. Webster, Cliff)

4 min
Penalties
4 min
30
Shots
23

9 April 2017; 16:30	Serbia	6–0 (3–0, 2–0, 1–0)	Iceland	Galați Skating Rink, Galați; Attendance: 200

Game reference

Arsenije Ranković
Goalies
Dennis Hedström
Referee:
(Italy) Andrea Moschen
Linesmen:
(Germany) Markus Eberl
(Romania) Levente-Szilard Siko

Vučurević (Popravko) – 03:51	1–0
Brkušanin (Bjelogrlić, Bibić) – 13:55	2–0
Vučurević (Sretoviċ, Popravko) – 16:04	3–0
Brkušanin (Podunavac, Bibić) – 26:07	4–0
Brkušanin (Crnogorac) – 34:16	5–0
Vučurević (Crnogorac, Sretoviċ) – 40:55	6–0

6 min
Penalties
12 min
27
Shots
28

9 April 2017; 20:00	Romania	6–0 (1–0, 2–0, 3–0)	Spain	Galați Skating Rink, Galați; Attendance: 3,200

Game reference

Zoltán Tőke
Goalies
Ignacio García
Raúl Barbo
Referee:
(Finland) Aaro Brannare
Linesmen:
(Netherlands) Lodewyk Beelen
(Lithuania) Benas Jakšys

S. Rokaly (Gecse) – 16:05	1–0
O. Bíró (M. Bíró, Georgescu) – 22:24	2–0
Mihály (G. Bíró, Gliga) – 32:52	3–0
Mihály (M. Bíró) – 43:29	4–0
Georgescu (Péter, Irimia) – 43:45	5–0
Bors (Fodor) (PP) – 57:20	6–0

8 min
Penalties
8 min
32
Shots
17

=== Awards and statistics ===
==== Awards ====
- Best players selected by the directorate:
  - Best Goalkeeper: (Australia) Anthony Kimlin
  - Best Defenseman: (Serbia) Dominik Crnogorac
  - Best Forward: (Romania) Csanád Fodor

Source: IIHF.com

==== Scoring leaders ====
List shows the top skaters sorted by points, then goals.

Player	GP	G	A	Pts	+/−	PIM	POS
(Romania) Ede Mihály	5	8	1	9	+6	4	F
(Serbia) Marko Sretović	5	3	6	9	+9	0	F
(Belgium) Mitch Morgan	5	2	7	9	−2	2	F
(Serbia) Nemanja Vučurević	5	5	3	8	+5	12	F
(Romania) Mátyás Bíró	5	2	6	8	+5	0	F
(Romania) Roberto Gliga	5	0	8	8	+5	0	F
(Belgium) Vincent Morgan	5	3	4	7	−2	4	F
(Romania) Mihail Georgescu	5	2	5	7	+5	4	F
(Serbia) Dominik Crnogorac	5	0	7	7	+3	2	D
(Australia) Lliam Webster	5	0	7	7	+2	14	D

GP = Games played; G = Goals; A = Assists; Pts = Points; +/− = Plus/minus; PIM = Penalties in minutes; POS = Position
Source: IIHF.com

==== Goaltending leaders ====
Only the top five goaltenders, based on save percentage, who have played at least 40% of their team's minutes, are included in this list.

Player	TOI	GA	GAA	SA	Sv%	SO
(Romania) Zoltán Tőke	288:21	5	1.04	90	94.44	1
(Australia) Anthony Kimlin	301:17	13	2.59	160	91.88	1
(Serbia) Arsenije Ranković	304:21	15	2.96	156	90.38	1
(Iceland) Dennis Hedström	274:38	17	3.71	158	89.24	1
(Spain) Ignacio García	286:00	21	4.41	138	84.78	0

TOI = Time on ice (minutes:seconds); SA = Shots against; GA = Goals against; GAA = Goals against average; Sv% = Save percentage; SO = Shutouts
Source: IIHF.com

== Group B tournament ==
2017 IIHF World Championship Division II B

Tournament details
- Host country: New Zealand
- Venue: 1 (in 1 host city)
- Dates: 4–10 April
- Teams: 6

Tournament statistics
- Games played: 15
- Goals scored: 113 (7.53 per game)
- Attendance: 3,229 (215 per game)
- Scoring leader: (Israel) Elie Klein (11 points)

Official website
- IIHF.com

=== Participants ===
Team	Qualification
China	Placed 6th in Division II A last year and were relegated.
Mexico	Placed 2nd in Division II B last year.
Israel	Placed 3rd in Division II B last year.
New Zealand	Host, placed 4th in Division II B last year.
North Korea	Placed 5th in Division II B last year.
Turkey	Placed 1st in Division III last year and were promoted.

=== Match officials ===
4 referees and 7 linesmen were selected for the tournament.

Referees

- (Belgium) Chris Deweerdt
- (Canada) Scott Ferguson
- (Japan) Kenji Kosaka
- (Latvia) Gints Zviedrītis

Linesmen

- (South Korea) Chae Young-jin
- (United States) Justin Cornell
- (New Zealand) Tyler Haslemore
- (New Zealand) Edward Howard
- (Australia) Nicholas Lee
- (Belgium) Frederic Monnaie
- (Japan) Sotaro Yamaguchi

=== Standings ===
Pos	Team	Pld	W	OTW	OTL	L	GF	GA	GD	Pts	Qualification or relegation
1	China (P)	5	5	0	0	0	29	12	+17	15	Promoted to Division II A
2	New Zealand (H)	5	4	0	0	1	23	11	+12	12	
3	Israel	5	3	0	0	2	24	14	+10	9	
4	North Korea	5	1	0	0	4	18	33	−15	3 (Note: North Korea 3 Pts, +4 GD; Mexico 3 Pts, +3 GD, Turkey 3 Pts, −7 GD)	
5	Mexico	5	1	0	0	4	12	16	−4	3	
6	Turkey (R)	5	1	0	0	4	7	27	−20	3	Relegation to Division III

Source: IIHF
Rules for classification: 1) points; 2) head-to-head points; 3) head-to-head goal difference; 4) head-to-head number of goals scored; 5) result against closest best-ranked team outside tied teams; 6) result against second-best ranked team outside tied teams; 7) seeding before tournament.
(H) Host; (P) Promoted; (R) Relegated

=== Results ===
All times are local (UTC+12).

4 April 2017; 13:00	Mexico	5–1 (1–0, 3–1, 1–0)	North Korea	Paradice Botany Downs, Auckland; Attendance: 100

Game reference

Alfonso de Alba
Goalies
Pak Kuk-chol
Referee:
(Canada) Scott Ferguson
Linesmen:
(United States) Justin Cornell
(Belgium) Frederic Monnaie

De la Vega (Majul, Gómez) – 18:52	1–0
Pérez (Majul) – 25:47	2–0
De la Vega (Gómez, Majul) – 26:50	3–0
Pérez (Nalera, Bermejo) – 32:06	4–0
	4–1	35:51 – Ri C. (Ri P.)
Rubio (Kelo, Sierra) – 53:46	5–1

12 min
Penalties
4 min
29
Shots
30

4 April 2017; 16:30	Israel	2–5 (1–2, 1–0, 0–3)	China	Paradice Botany Downs, Auckland; Attendance: 100

Game reference

Maxim Gokhberg
Goalies
Sun Zehao
Referee:
(Latvia) Gints Zviedrītis
Linesmen:
(South Korea) Chae Young-jin
(New Zealand) Edward Howard

	0–1	00:53 – Xia (Zhang C.)
	0–2	01:58 – Ying (Zhang Z.)
Kozhevnikov (Klein) – 19:40	1–2
R. Aharonovich (Kafri) – 39:21	2–2
	2–3	47:24 – Zhang P. (Guan)
	2–4	55:39 – Zhang Z. (Hu, Yang)
	2–5	59:59 – Zhang H. (Ji, Ying) (ENG)

6 min
Penalties
8 min
28
Shots
35

4 April 2017; 20:00	Turkey	1–4 (0–1, 0–2, 1–1)	New Zealand	Paradice Botany Downs, Auckland; Attendance: 350

Game reference

Tolga Bozacı
Goalies
Rick Parry
Referee:
(Belgium) Chris Deweerdt
Linesmen:
(Australia) Nicholas Lee
(Japan) Sotaro Yamaguchi

	0–1	17:57 – Heyd (Challis)
	0–2	20:29 – Challis
	0–3	24:58 – Ratcliffe (Eaden, Polozov)
	0–4	55:14 – Challis (Cox)
Semiz (Coşkun) – 59:55	1–4

12 min
Penalties
6 min
22
Shots
44

5 April 2017; 13:00	Mexico	2–6 (0–0, 0–4, 2–2)	Israel	Paradice Botany Downs, Auckland; Attendance: 100

Game reference

Alfonso de Alba
Richard Albrecht
Goalies
Maxim Gokhberg
Referee:
(Japan) Kenji Kosaka
Linesmen:
(South Korea) Chae Young-jin
(New Zealand) Tyler Haslemore

	0–1	30:49 – R. Aharonovich (PP)
	0–2	32:51 – Spektor (Klein)
	0–3	33:10 – Mazour (R. Aharonovich, Vernyy)
	0–4	39:13 – Kozevnikov (Spivak, Klein) (PP)
Gómez (Ugarte, Colás) – 50:27	1–4
Majul (Sierra) – 51:44	2–4
	2–5	52:16 – Spektor (Klein)
	2–6	55:54 – Mazour (Kozevnikov, Kozhevnikov) (PP)

16 min
Penalties
12 min
27
Shots
33

5 April 2017; 16:30	North Korea	11–3 (6–0, 4–2, 1–1)	Turkey	Paradice Botany Downs, Auckland; Attendance: 100

Game reference

Pak Kuk-chol
Pak Il
Goalies
Tolga Bozacı
Muhammed Karagül
Referee:
(Latvia) Gints Zviedrītis
Linesmen:
(Australia) Nicholas Lee
(Japan) Sotaro Yamaguchi

Ri P. – 02:58	1–0
Hong (Ri C.) – 07:09	2–0
Kim H. (Kim S.) – 07:33	3–0
An (Hong, Ri P.) (SH) – 10:30	4–0
Kim.S (Kang M.) – 12:59	5–0
Hong (Ri C., Kim S.) (PP) – 18:47	6–0
Ri C. (PP) – 25:27	7–0
	7–1	27:11 – Halil (Öztürk, Çetinkaya) (PP)
Kim M. (Ri P.) – 29:04	8–1
Kim Kw. (Kang I.) – 32:56	9–1
Hong (Ri P.) – 34:33	10–1
	10–2	36:21 – Gümüş
Kim Kw. (Kang M.) – 42:15	11–2
	11–3	49:18 – Halil (Semiz, Gümüş) (PP)

12 min
Penalties
12 min
41
Shots
16

5 April 2017; 20:00	China	5–2 (1–1, 1–1, 3–0)	New Zealand	Paradice Botany Downs, Auckland; Attendance: 450

Game reference

Sun Zehao
Goalies
Rick Parry
Referee:
(Canada) Scott Ferguson
Linesmen:
(United States) Justin Cornell
(Belgium) Frederic Monnaie

	0–1	11:59 – Heyd (Ruddle, Haines)
Ji (Zhang H., Zhang Z.) (PP) – 18:24	1–1
	1–2	24:54 – Ruddle (Polozov, Ratcliffe) (PP2)
Yang (Xia, Hu) (PP) – 27:40	2–2
Xiang (Yang, Liang) – 47:31	3–2
Zhang P. (Hu) – 50:23	4–2
Xiang (ENG) – 59:33	5–2

12 min
Penalties
10 min
40
Shots
25

7 April 2017; 13:00	China	8–3 (6–1, 1–1, 1–1)	North Korea	Paradice Botany Downs, Auckland; Attendance: 100

Game reference

Sun Zehao
Goalies
Pak Il
Referee:
(Belgium) Chris Deweerdt
Linesmen:
(New Zealand) Edward Howard
(Belgium) Frederic Monnaie

Zhang Z. (Lu, Ying) – 01:57	1–0
Zhang C. (Chen) – 02:31	2–0
Zhang H. (Li Z.) – 07:15	3–0
Liu Q. (Ji) (PP) – 12:18	4–0
	4–1	14:49 – Kim C.-g. (An, Kim Kw.)
Yang (PP) – 16:46	5–1
Guan (Chen) – 19:59	6–1
	6–2	23:20 – Kim C.-g.
Yang (Hu, Zhang C.) (PP2) – 30:34	7–2
Xia (Guan) (SH) – 50:47	8–2
	8–3	59:59 – Kim Kw. (Ri C.) (PP)

18 min
Penalties
22 min
37
Shots
28

7 April 2017; 16:30	Mexico	0–1 (0–1, 0–0, 0–0)	Turkey	Paradice Botany Downs, Auckland; Attendance: 100

Game reference
Richard Albrecht	Goalies	Tolga Bozacı	Referee: (Canada) Scott Ferguson; Linesmen: (South Korea) Chae Young-jin (New Zealand) Tyler Haslemore
0–1 / 17:11 – Bakal (Savaş) (SH)			Referee: (Canada) Scott Ferguson; Linesmen: (South Korea) Chae Young-jin (New Zealand) Tyler Haslemore
12 min	Penalties	35 min	Referee: (Canada) Scott Ferguson; Linesmen: (South Korea) Chae Young-jin (New Zealand) Tyler Haslemore
24	Shots	18	Referee: (Canada) Scott Ferguson; Linesmen: (South Korea) Chae Young-jin (New Zealand) Tyler Haslemore

7 April 2017; 20:00	Israel	2–5 (1–3, 0–2, 1–0)	New Zealand	Paradice Botany Downs, Auckland; Attendance: 500

Game reference

Maxim Gokhberg
Goalies
Rick Parry
Referee:
(Japan) Kenji Kosaka
Linesmen:
(United States) Justin Cornell
(Japan) Sotaro Yamaguchi

	0–1	01:48 – Burns (Henderson, Cox) (PP)
	0–2	03:31 – Ratcliffe (Ellis, Jackson)
	0–3	16:46 – Ratcliffe (Eaden, Henderson)
Spektor (Klein) (SH) – 18:24	1–3
	1–4	27:34 – Ratcliffe (Eaden, Craig) (PP)
	1–5	36:41 – Heyd (Ratcliffe)
Spektor (Kapulkin) – 44:56	2–5

12 min
Penalties
14 min
39
Shots
38

9 April 2017; 13:00	Turkey	2–7 (1–2, 0–2, 1–3)	China	Paradice Botany Downs, Auckland; Attendance: 100

Game reference

Muhammed Karagül
Goalies
Sun Zehao
Referee:
(Japan) Kenji Kosaka
Linesmen:
(South Korea) Chae Young-jin
(New Zealand) Tyler Haslemore

	0–1	07:30 – Zhang H. (Liu Q.) (PP)
	0–2	10:09 – Zhang C. (Xia, Chen)
Bakal (Semiz, Y. Kars) (PP) – 16:59	1–2
	1–3	27:10 – Zhang Z. (Liu Q., Zhang H.) (PP)
	1–4	39:42 – Zhang C. (Chen) (PP)
	1–5	43:49 – Zhang C.
	1–6	49:59 – Xiang (Zhang Z., Ying)
Bakal (Semiz) – 53:29	2–6
	2–7	54:46 – Zhang H. (Li H., Bao)

16 min
Penalties
14 min
27
Shots
32

9 April 2017; 16:30	North Korea	2–9 (0–1, 1–6, 1–2)	Israel	Paradice Botany Downs, Auckland; Attendance: 100

Game reference

Pak Il
Goalies
Maxim Gokhberg
Nir Tichon
Referee:
(Belgium) Chris Deweerdt
Linesmen:
(New Zealand) Edward Howard
(Japan) Sotaro Yamaguchi

	0–1	12:47 – R. Aharonovich (Spektor) (PP)
	0–2	28:43 – Spektor (R. Aharonovich, Kozevnikov) (PP)
	0–3	32:09 – R. Aharonovich (Spektor, Mazour) (PP)
	0–4	33:06 – Kozhevnikov (Vernyy)
	0–5	34:30 – Klein (Mazour)
	0–6	35:30 – Klein (Vernyy)
	0–7	35:57 – Kozevnikov (Kozhevnikov)
Kim M (Ri C., Ri P.) – 37:13	1–7
	1–8	43:26 – Klein (Kozhevnikov) (PP)
Ri C. (SH) – 53:49	2–8
	2–9	57:03 – Spektor (Klein) (SH)

30 min
Penalties
6 min
20
Shots
47

9 April 2017; 20:00	New Zealand	4–2 (2–0, 1–2, 1–0)	Mexico	Paradice Botany Downs, Auckland; Attendance: 518

Game reference

Rick Parry
Goalies
Alfonso de Alba
Referee:
(Latvia) Gints Zviedrītis
Linesmen:
(Australia) Nicholas Lee
(Belgium) Frederic Monnaie

Ellis – 18:52	1–0
Eaden (Ruddle) (PP) – 19:39	2–0
	2–1	23:54 – De la Vega
Sandoy (Heyd) – 36:14	3–1
	3–2	38:46 – De la Vega (Ugarte, Gómez) (PP)
Ratcliffe (Eaden, Polozov) – 55:40	4–2

8 min
Penalties
10 min
43
Shots
32

10 April 2017; 13:00	Israel	5–0 (1–0, 1–0, 3–0)	Turkey	Paradice Botany Downs, Auckland; Attendance: 101

Game reference

Maxim Gokhberg
Goalies
Tolga Bozacı
Referee:
(Belgium) Chris Deweerdt
Linesmen:
(New Zealand) Edward Howard
(Belgium) Frederic Monnaie

Mazour (Vernyy, Klein) – 08:46	1–0
Greenberg (Kozhevnikov) – 22:03	2–0
Klein (Vernyy, Kozevnikov) (PP2) – 46:16	3–0
Mazour (Spektor, R. Aharonovich) (PP) – 47:11	4–0
Mazour (Kozhevnikov, Kozevnikov) (PP) – 51:49	5–0

14 min
Penalties
14 min
33
Shots
26

10 April 2017; 16:30	China	4–3 (2–0, 2–3, 0–0)	Mexico	Paradice Botany Downs, Auckland; Attendance: 103

Game reference

Sun Zehao
Goalies
Alfonso de Alba
Referee:
(Latvia) Gints Zviedrītis
Linesmen:
(New Zealand) Tyler Haslemore
(Australia) Nicholas Lee

Xia (Hu) (PP) – 07:46	1–0
Liang (Lu, Zhang C.) (PP) – 18:18	2–0
	2–1	26:39 – Gómez (Colás, Pérez)
Lu – 35:40	3–1
Xia (SH) – 36:47	4–1
	4–2	37:55 – Colás (Majul, Gómez) (PP)
	4–3	39:18 – Majul (Kelo, Gómez) (PP)

50 min
Penalties
16 min
38
Shots
40

10 April 2017; 20:00	New Zealand	8–1 (2–1, 4–0, 2–0)	North Korea	Paradice Botany Downs, Auckland; Attendance: 407

Game reference

Aston Brookes
Goalies
Pak Il
Referee:
(Canada) Scott Ferguson
Linesmen:
(United States) Justin Cornell
(Japan) Sotaro Yamaguchi

Challis (Heyd, Henderson) – 00:57	1–0
	1–1	15:20 – Kim C.-g. (Kang M., Kim N.)
Ratcliffe (Craig) – 19:42	2–1
Ruddle – 22:24	3–1
Cox (Henderson, Challis) (PP) – 26:44	4–1
Ruddle (Polozov, Ratcliffe) (PP) – 34:12	5–1
Ruddle (Craig, Ratcliffe) (PP) – 39:58	6–1
Challis (Henderson) – 59:17	7–1
Hay (Polozov, Harrop) – 59:40	8–1

12 min
Penalties
16 min
43
Shots
25

=== Awards and statistics ===
==== Awards ====
- Best players selected by the directorate:
  - Best Goalkeeper: (New Zealand) Rick Parry
  - Best Defenseman: (Israel) Michael Kozevnikov
  - Best Forward: (China) Zhang Hao

Source: IIHF.com

==== Scoring leaders ====
List shows the top skaters sorted by points, then goals.

Player	GP	G	A	Pts	+/−	PIM	POS
(Israel) Elie Klein	5	4	7	11	+3	4	F
(New Zealand) Jacob Ratcliffe	5	6	4	10	+4	4	F
(Israel) Ilya Spektor	5	6	3	9	+2	4	F
(Israel) Daniel Mazour	5	5	2	7	0	6	F
(China) Zhang Cheng	5	4	3	7	+3	12	F
(North Korea) Ri Chol-min	5	3	4	7	−4	2	F
(Mexico) Carlos Gómez	5	2	5	7	+3	4	F
(Israel) Evgeni Kozhevnikov	5	2	5	7	0	6	F
(New Zealand) Jordan Challis	5	4	2	6	+3	0	F
(New Zealand) Ryan Ruddle	5	4	2	6	+1	4	F
(China) Xia Tianxiang	5	4	2	6	+7	6	F
(China) Zhang Hao	5	4	2	6	+1	4	F

GP = Games played; G = Goals; A = Assists; Pts = Points; +/− = Plus/minus; PIM = Penalties in minutes; POS = Position
Source: IIHF.com

==== Goaltending leaders ====
Only the top five goaltenders, based on save percentage, who have played at least 40% of their team's minutes, are included in this list.

Player	TOI	GA	GAA	SA	Sv%	SO
(New Zealand) Rick Parry	239:45	9	2.25	134	93.28	0
(China) Sun Zehao	300:00	12	2.40	148	91.89	0
(Israel) Maxim Gokhberg	289:28	12	2.49	142	91.55	1
(Mexico) Alfonso de Alba	218:39	13	3.57	133	90.23	0
(Turkey) Tolga Bozacı	190:30	13	4.09	115	88.70	1

TOI = Time on ice (minutes:seconds); SA = Shots against; GA = Goals against; GAA = Goals against average; Sv% = Save percentage; SO = Shutouts
Source: IIHF.com
