= The Last Aristocrats =

- English-language film poster
- Traditional Chinese: 最後的貴族
- Simplified Chinese: 最后的贵族
- Hanyu Pinyin: Zuìhòudě Guìzú
- Directed by: Xie Jin
- Written by: Bai Hua; Sun Zhengguo; Pai Hsien-Yung
- Based on: Zhexianji by Pai Hsien-yung
- Produced by: Bi Likui; Su Rundong
- Starring: Pan Hong; Pu Cunxin; Li Kequn; Xiao Xiong
- Cinematography: Lu Junfu
- Edited by: Zhou Dingwen
- Music by: Jin Fuzai
- Production company: Shanghai Film Studio
- Distributed by: Shanghai Film Studio
- Release date: 23 December 1989 (South Korea)
- Running time: 120 minutes
- Country: China
- Languages: Mandarin; English

The Last Aristocrats (Chinese: 最后的贵族) is a 1989 Chinese drama film directed by Xie Jin and starring Pan Hong, Pu Cunxin, Li Kequn, and Xiao Xiong. It is based on the short story Zhexianji by Taiwanese novelist Bai Xianyong. The film picks up the story of the lives of four young Chinese girls, daughters of Shanghai's elite, who went to the United States to study in 1948 and faced difficulties trying to return home a year later. The film was released in South Korea on 23 December 1989.

== Plot ==
In the spring of 1947 in Nanjing, Jiangsu, Li Tong (Pan Hong) spends her twentieth birthday in a happy atmosphere. She then pursues advanced studies in the United States with her friends Huang Huifen (Li Kequn), Lei Zhiling (Xiao Xiong) and Zhang Jiaxing (Lu Ling). The four young girls are daughters of Shanghai's elite. Li Tong's father (Wang Bing) is a diplomat in the Nationalist Government.

When the Communists take over Shanghai in 1948, Li Tong's parents dies in a storm on their way to Taiwan. Li Tong's boyfriend Chen Yin (Pu Cunxin), a graduate of Harvard University, finds a job as a lawyer. They celebrate the happy event in a restaurant. After hearing the tragic news, Li Tong becomes more and more melancholy. She quietly leaves and disappears without a trace.

Three years later, Li Tong appears at Zhang Jiaxing's wedding, her heavy make-up gives her friends mixed feelings.

Before long, Chen Yin learns by newspaper that Li Tong was arrested by the police due to drinking and rioting. Chen Yin goes to the police station to bail her out and takes her home. He tries to persuade her to cheer up, but she has lost her soul.

Another spring later, after traveling around the world, Li Tong arrives at her birthplace, Venice, and throws herself into the sea.

== Cast ==
- Pan Hong as Li Tong (李彤)
- Pu Cunxin as Chen Yin (陳寅)
- Li Kequn as Huang Huifen (黃慧芬)
- Xiao Xiong as Lei Zhiling (雷芷苓)
- Lu Ling as Zhang Jiaxing (張嘉行)
- Lisa Lu as Li Tong's mother
- Wang Bing as Li Tong's father
- Li Weixin as Huang Huifen's father
- Yan Meiyi as Huang Huifen's mother
- Yan Bide as Zhang Jiaxing's father
- Zhu Xijuan as Zhang Jiaxing's mother
- Ying Da as Zhou Daqing (周大慶)
- Mao Yongming as Doctor Wang (王醫生), husband of Zhang Jiaxing
- Ma Xiaofeng as Zhang Jiaxing's brother
- Marcelline Block as Christmas caroler
- Amy Yen-Lung Chen as Lily
- Amy Chow as Cashier
- Hong Tran as Dim Sum cook
- Lynn Ann Guisti as Distressed child
- Alice Liu as Wife

== Production ==
On April 26, 1987, Xie Jin and Pai Hsien-yung met at the West Lake in Hangzhou, Zhejiang, they talked about changing the short story Zhexianji (謫仙記) into a movie. Brigitte Lin had been considered to star as Li Tong, the female lead role in the film, but at that time the relationship between the two sides of the Taiwan Strait had not been thawing, she was recognized by reporters at Shanghai Hongqiao International Airport, and under the pressure of the authorities, she had to give up acting the movie. Her role was replaced by mainland actress Pan Hong.

Two-thirds of the film was shot on location in the United States. The film wrapped in May 1989.

== Release ==
The film was released on 23 December 1989 in South Korea and received negative reviews.
