= Wen Xingyu =

Chinese comedian and director

Wen Xingyu (Chinese: 文兴宇; 1941–2007) was a popular comedian and director in mainland China. Wen was famous for his relaxing style and his talent as a senior comedian. He died on 30 July 2007 in Beijing due to lung cancer at the age of 65.

== Biography and career ==
- Born on 6 August 1941 in Dandong, Liaoning Province, China.
- Graduated from Beijing 101 Middle School and Central Academy of Drama.

== Major works ==
- The opera version of The True Story of Ah Q; I Love My Family; Home with Kids.
