= Lin Yongjian =

Chinese actor (born 1970)

- Born: 14 February 1970 (age 56); Qingdao, Shandong, China
- Occupation: Actor
- Years active: 1988–present
- Spouse: Zhou Dongqi (m. 2003)
- Children: 1

Lin Yongjian (Chinese: 林永健; pinyin: Lín Yǒngjiàn, born 14 February 1970) is a Chinese actor.

Lin graduated from PRC Academy of Drama in 1990 and was a successful stage actor at Guangzhou Soldiers' Drama Troupe after graduation. He has starred in more than 50 comedies and dramas and has won a number of awards.

== Films ==
Year	Title	Role	Notes
2006	Neither Dragon nor Phoenix	Yi Wu	Leading role
2007	Golden Anniversary	Yu Xin	Leading role
2008	Army Stories in Highland	Wang Tie Shan	Leading role
2010	Before the Dawn	Zhongshu Tan	Leading role
2010	Master Lin in Seoul	Fei Lin	Leading role
2014	The Galaxy on Earth		
2015	Follow Me My Queen	Lin Dajian	Leading role
2016	Wang Mao		
2019	Mao Zedong 1949	Nie Rongzhen	
2023	The Volunteers: To the War	Nie Rongzhen	
2026	Crossing	Wang Jialie	

== Awards ==
Awards
Year	Film	Category	Notes
2010	50 China Charisma Award		
2010	The Dawn	Best Actor	2010 TV Drama Awards Made in China
2009		Best Actor Nominator	2009 Soaring up to Sky National TV Series Award:
2008	Xi-Gentian's Story	Best Actor	40th National Golden Eagle Award
