= I Love My Family =

- 我爱我家
- Genre: Sitcom/Drama/Soap opera
- Written by: Liang Zuo; Wang Shuo
- Directed by: Ying Da; Lin Cong
- Starring: Wen Xingyu; Song Dandan; Yang Lixin; Guan Ling; Li Yunqiao; Liang Tian; Shen Chang
- Country of origin: China
- Original language: Mandarin
- No. of seasons: 2
- No. of episodes: 120

Original release
- Release: 1993 – 1994

I Love My Family (simplified Chinese: 我爱我家; traditional Chinese: 我愛我家; pinyin: Wǒ Ài Wǒ Jiā) is a Chinese sitcom aired from 1993 to 1994. It was China's first multi-camera sitcom and the first Mandarin-language sitcom, consisting of 120 episodes. Directed by Ying Da, with Wang Shuo and Liang Zuo (梁左) as scriptwriters, the series depicts the daily life of a six-member Beijing family in the 1990s, along with their neighbors, relatives, and friends, reflecting societal changes during China's economic reforms. It was produced by Beijing Red Green Blue TV and Commercials Center.

I Love My Family is notable for being the first and one of the very few Chinese multi-camera sitcoms to be performed in front of a live audience and with a laugh track, with the other being 1998's Chinese Restaurant, also helmed by Ying. Primarily a sitcom, each scene plays like a skit, combining humour and emotional content.

Director Ying Da discovered and developed a passion for situation comedies during his theater studies and internship in the United States from 1985 to 1987. When the popularity of Mandarin-dubbed episodes of Growing Pains was at its peak in 1992, Ying brainstormed with New Beijing School writer Wang Shuo and xiangsheng writer Liang Zuo on the creation of localized sitcom. The show was shot live at the campus of Communication University of China, and most of its audience were University students. Occasionally, writer Wang Shuo and director Feng Xiaogang would be spot among the audience members.

I Love My Family depicts urban Chinese life amid rapid social and economic change. It addresses contemporary issues of its time such as fraud, the qigong craze, and the xiahai movement, in which individuals left state employment for private enterprise. The series also touches on moonlighting, studying abroad, rural migration, and other trends of the 1990s. Each episode introduces a disruption to family harmony that is ultimately resolved, following the structure of an American-style sitcom.

The show was initially met with "lukewarm audience response" in some cities and was once criticized for its negative portrayal of retired cadres. It however soon gathered a record high of 85% viewership rating, and developed a loyal fan group in the following years with frequent rerun. It is regarded as a "milestone of Chinese sitcoms".

In April 2023, the complete script of the show was released in a three-volume compilation spanning 1,500 pages. The collection includes soundtrack lyrics, behind-the-scenes stories, and over 300 production stills.

== Cast and characters ==
=== Main cast ===
- Wen Xingyu as Fu Ming (Jia Jingxian): A retired party bureaucrat and the family patriarch.
- Yang Lixin as Jia Zhiguo: The oldest son of the Jia family, a civil servant and intellectual.
- Song Dandan as He Ping: Jia Zhiguo's wife, a family homemaker with a background in local performing arts.
- Liang Tian as Jia Zhixin: Jia Zhiguo's younger brother, an unemployed youth.
- Shen Chang as Jia Xiaofan: The youngest daughter of the Jia family, a college student who later went to study abroad.
- Guan Ling as Jia Yuanyuan: Jia Zhiguo and He Ping's daughter, a lively child.

=== Guest appearances ===
The series featured numerous guest stars, including Ge You, Wang Zhiwen, Cai Ming, Jiang Wen, and many more.

Director Ying Da would later helm several multi-camera comedies and dramas, including the 2013 spiritual successor We Are a Family (我们一家人).

== Bibliography ==
- Miao, Di (2008). Zhu, Ying; Keane, Michael; Bai, Ruoyun (eds.). TV drama in China. TransAsia: screen cultures. Hong Kong: Hong Kong University Press. ISBN 978-962-209-940-1.
