= Cai Rukai =

Chinese politician in the late Qing Dynasty

- 蔡儒楷
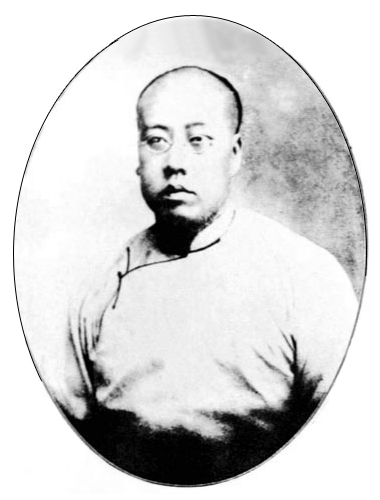
- Cai Rukai

Minister of Education
- In office 25 February 1914 – 1914
- Preceded by: Wang Daxie
- Succeeded by: Yan Xiu

President of National Peiyang University
- In office February 1913 – March 1914
- Preceded by: Xu Deyuan
- Succeeded by: Zhao Tianlin

Supervisor of Imperial Peiyang University
- In office 1909 – November 1911
- Preceded by: Cai Shaoji
- Succeeded by: Xu Deyuan

Personal details
- Born: 1867 Nanchang, Jiangxi, Qing China
- Died: 1923 (aged 55–56) Beijing, Republic of China
- Relations: Ying Qianli (Son-in-law)
- Children: Cai Baozhen (daughter)
- Parent: Cai Yuan (father)

Cai Rukai (Chinese: 蔡儒楷; pinyin: Cài Rúkǎi; 1867 – 1923) was a Chinese politician and educator of the late Qing dynasty and early Republican period.

== Biography ==
Cai was born in Nanchang, Jiangxi in 1867. During the reign of Guangxu Emperor in the Qing dynasty, he successfully achieved the rank of Juren on the imperial examination.

In January 1906 he became supervisor of Imperial Peiyang University, and served until December 1911. In 1912, after the establishment of the Republic of China, he became director of Zhili Education Bureau, a position at provincial level. Under the Beiyang government, he served as President of National Peiyang University between February 1913 and March 1914, and then he rose to become Minister of Education. In December 1915, after Yuan Shikai's accession to the throne, Yuan conferred the title of "Barons of the First Rank" (一等男) to him. In 1921 he was appointed general manager of Nanchang–Jiujiang railway, serving in the post until he died in 1923.

== Personal life ==
Cai has a daughter, Cai Baozhen (蔡葆真), who once served as president of Beijing Children's Library, she was married to Ying Qianli (1900–1969), a prominent Catholic layman and educator.

== Additional sources ==
- Lai Xinxia (2000). History of Peiyang Army. Tianjin: Nankai University Press. ISBN 7-310-01517-7.
- Xu Youchun (2007). Dictionary of Republican Period Figures. Shijiazhuang, Hebei: Hebei People's Publishing House. ISBN 978-7-202-03014-1.
- Liu Shoulin (1995). Official Chronology of the Republic of China (1912–1949). Beijing: Zhonghua Book Company. ISBN 7-101-01320-1.

Government offices
Preceded by Wang Daxie	Minister of Education; 1914–1914	Succeeded by Yan Xiu
Educational offices
Preceded by Cai Shaoji (蔡绍基)	Supervisor of Imperial Peiyang University; 1909–1911	Succeeded by Xu Deyuan (徐德源)
Preceded by Xu Deyuan (徐德源)	President of National Peiyang University; 1913–1914	Succeeded by Zhao Tianlin (趙天麟)
