= Ta Kung Pao =

Chinese state newspaper

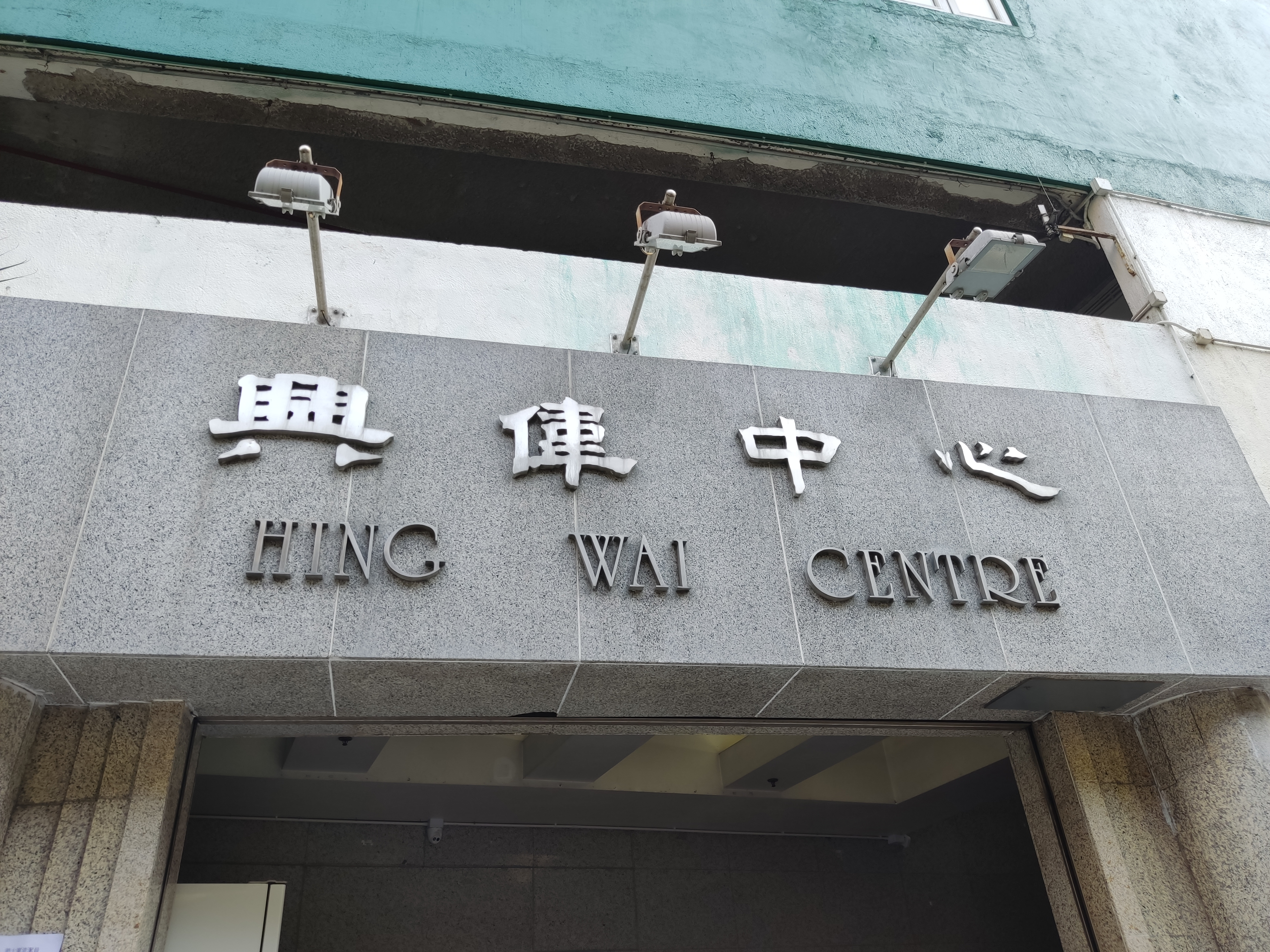
- Hing Wai Centre, which has the Hong Kong head office of Ta Kung Pao
- Type: Daily newspaper; state media
- Format: Broadsheet
- Owner: Hong Kong Ta Kung Wen Wei Media Group (subsidiary of Hong Kong Liaison Office)
- Founder: Ying Lianzhi
- Editor: Wong Wai-Keung
- Founded: 17 June 1902; 124 years ago
- Political alignment: Pro-Beijing camp
- Website: www.takungpao.com

Ta Kung Pao
- Traditional Chinese: 大公報
- Simplified Chinese: 大公报
Transcriptions
Standard Mandarin
- Hanyu Pinyin: Dàgōng Bào
Yue: Cantonese
- Jyutping: daai6 gung1 bou3

Ta Kung Pao (formerly L'Impartial in Latin-based languages) is a Hong Kong-based, state-owned Chinese-language newspaper. Founded in Tianjin in 1902, the paper is controlled by the Liaison Office of the Central People's Government in Hong Kong after the Chinese Civil War. It merged with another state-owned pro-Beijing newspaper, Wen Wei Po, in 2016.

== History ==
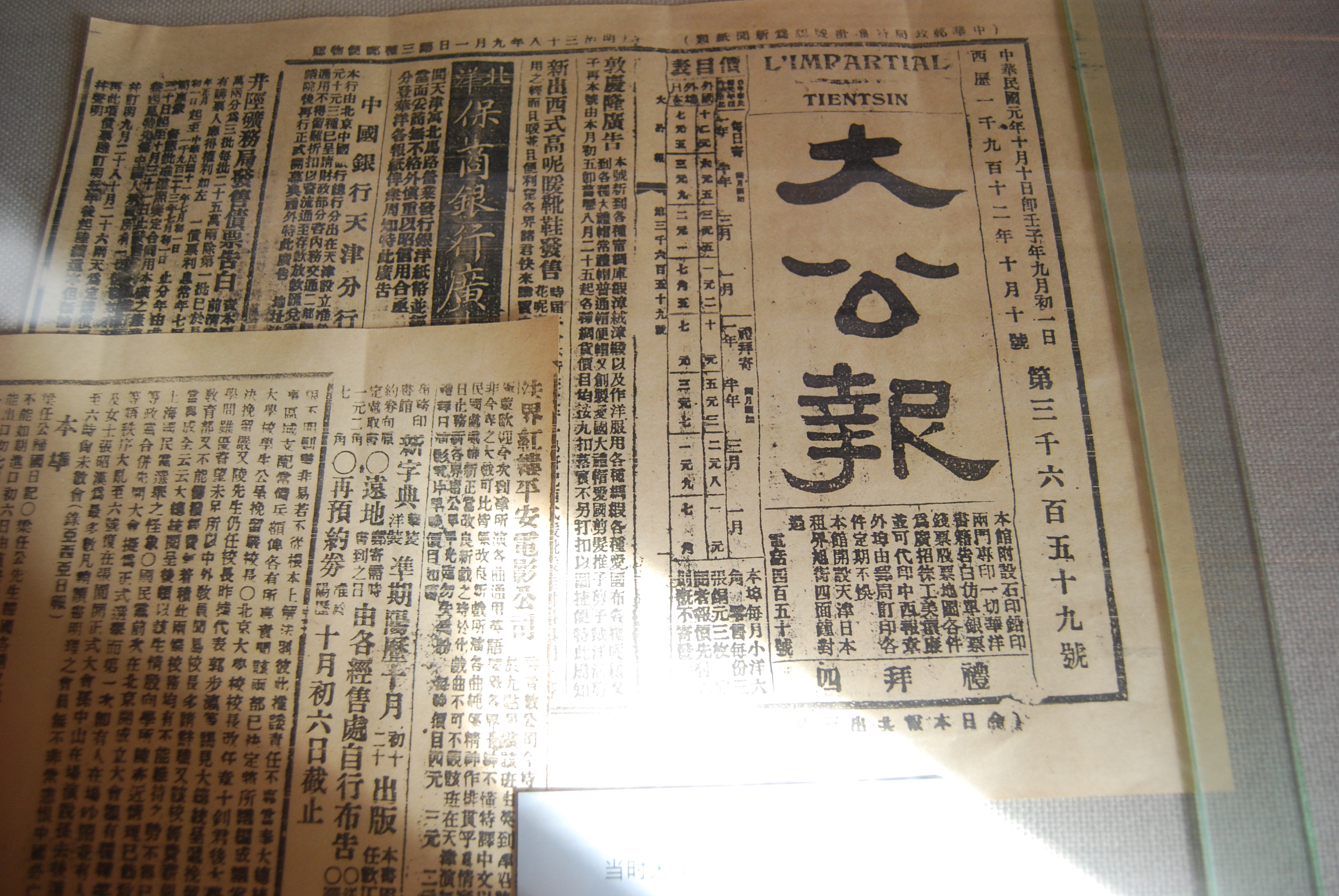
The Tianjin Ta Kung Pao (then known as L'Impartial in Latin-based languages) from 1912

=== 20th century ===
In the final years of the Qing dynasty, Ying Lianzhi, a Catholic Manchu aristocrat, founded the newspaper in Tianjin on 17 June 1902, in order to, "help China become a modern and democratic nation". The paper put forward the slogan "Four Noes" (四不主義) in its early years, pledging to say "No" to all political parties, governments, commercial companies, and persons. It stood up to the repression at the time, openly criticising the Empress Dowager Cixi and reactionary leaders, and promoted democratic reforms, pioneering the use of written vernacular Chinese (baihua).

The paper's 1902 criticism of the foreign forces of the Eight-Nation Alliance (which had established posts in Tianjin following the Boxer War) resulted in French authorities issuing fines against the paper; Ying moved its operations from the French concession to the Japanese concession.

In 1912, the Republic of China banned Ta Kung Pao after it criticised Yuan Shikai. Ying responded by distributing the paper free of charge.

Readership fell after the Xinhai Revolution in 1911 and Wang Zhilong bought it in 1916. Still, the newspaper was out of business by 1925 due to the lack of readership. On 1 September 1926, however, Wu Dingchang, Hu Zhengzhi, Zhang Jiluan re-established the newspaper in Tianjin.

As the war raged on, the newspaper's staff fled to other cities, such as Shanghai, Hankou, Chongqing, Guilin and Hong Kong, to continue publishing, but local editions were abandoned as the Japanese captured more and more territory. After the war was won, Wong Wan San, the chief editor, re-established the Shanghai edition on 1 November 1945, in the format and style of the old Shanghai edition. They had also planned to issue editions for other cities, including Guangzhou, but the Chinese Civil War forced this proposal to be shelved. Ta Kung Pao supported the Kuomintang at the beginning of the Civil War, but switched its sympathies to the Chinese Communist Party (CCP) after the repression of intellectuals, hyper-inflation, and other violent purges of political opponents by the Kuomintang.

In March 1948, the Hong Kong edition was re-established. A major newspaper during the Republican years, it continued to be influential after re-publication by Fei Yi Ming, the subsequent publisher in Hong Kong after 1949, as one of few newspapers that survived foreign invasion and civil war. In April 1952, the colonial authorities in Hong Kong tried the newspaper's proprietor, publisher, and its editor for violation of the Sedition Ordinance. Ta Kung Pao, along with the New Evening Post and Wen Wei Po, were charged with inciting an uprising by negatively reporting on the colonial authorities' response to a fire in Tung Tau Tsuen. As a result, Ta Kung Pao's leadership was fined, jailed, and ordered to cease reporting for six months.

A mass demonstration began in 1953 after protesters became dissatisfied with the Hong Kong government following a fire in the Tung Tau squatter area. The government in Guangzhou began fundraising to support the protesters and decided to dispatch a relief delegation to Hong Kong on 1 March 1952. The trip was cancelled after opposition from the Hong Kong government, and protests began on the same day targeting the Hong Kong police. Wen Wei Po and other publications supporting the Chinese government produced frequent reports emphasizing the Hong Kong government's neglect of the poor. On March 5, New Evening Post, Wen Wei Po and Ta Kung Pao reprinted an editorial from People's Daily, the newspaper of the Central Committee of the Chinese Communist Party, but removed references to "massacre of our countrymen" to avoid violating Hong Kong's Sedition Ordinance. However, the Hong Kong government accused the newspapers of sedition. Ta Kung Pao, its owner Fei Yiming and publisher Li Zongying received to nine and six months of prison sentence and fined a few thousand Hong Kong dollars. The newspaper was also ordered to stop publishing for six months.

Chinese Premier Zhou Enlai then issued a statement demanding Hong Kong to stop the prosecution. The British government told Hong Kong authorities days later to rescind the court sentence against Ta Kung Pao, its owner and its publisher, and the newspaper was allowed to publish again after 12 days of suspension.

=== 21st century ===
In 2016, Ta Kung Pao merged with Wen Wei Po to form the Hong Kong Dagong Wenhui Media Group, which is under the control of the Hong Kong Liaison Office.

In January 2019, Ta Kung Pao published an article stating that a "secret envoy" of president Tsai Ing-wen had met with three Hong Kong localist camp activists from the pro-independence group Studentlocalism. However, the "secret envoy" was actually Su Yong-yao, a senior political reporter for Liberty Times, a Taiwanese newspaper. The article was in turn criticized by the Taiwanese presidential office as "ridiculous" and "a piece of fake news". In 2019, the Chinese University of Hong Kong's Centre for Communication and Public Opinion Survey ranked Ta Kung Pao as having the lowest credibility score among all paid newspapers in Hong Kong.

During the 2019–2020 Hong Kong protests, Ta Kung Pao published antisemitic George Soros conspiracy theories, displaying Soros as a reptile in collusion with Jimmy Lai. In 2020, Ta Kung Pao frequently attacked judges perceived as siding with pro-democracy protesters, causing Chief Justice Geoffrey Ma to make an 18-page plea against attacking judges and the judiciary system. In November 2020, the Hong Kong Bar Association (HKBA) published a letter to Secretary of Justice Teresa Cheng, accusing Ta Kung Pao of publishing false material that claimed judge Anderson Chow was being supportive of criminal activities. The HKBA asked Teresa Cheng to protect the city's judges against false accusations.

During the COVID-19 pandemic, Ta Kung Pao spread vaccine misinformation and portrayed Western vaccines more negatively than Chinese ones, mirroring Chinese government disinformation about COVID-19. In 2022, the newspaper launched investigations into several Hong Kong academics that it deemed "anti-China scholars."

In May 2023, the newspaper attacked housing and urban planning NGO Liber Research Community, saying the NGO was "taking things out of context with groundless evidence."

In 2024, the newspaper partnered with the Heilongjiang Daily Newspaper Group to establish the Heilongjiang International Communication Center.

In March 2025, Ta Kung Pao ran a series of articles and editorials, republished by the CCP's Hong Kong and Macao Work Office, criticizing CK Hutchison Holdings and Li Ka-shing for agreeing to sell the company's Panama ports stake to BlackRock. In May 2025, in response to declining press freedom and greater censorship in Hong Kong, Ta Kung Pao called Reporters Without Borders a "thug" and termed its World Press Freedom Index a "political smear tool".

== Editorial stance ==
A 2021 content analysis published by the journal Global Media and China found Ta Kung Pao to be consistently aligned with the People's Daily and Xinmin Evening News.

== Organization ==
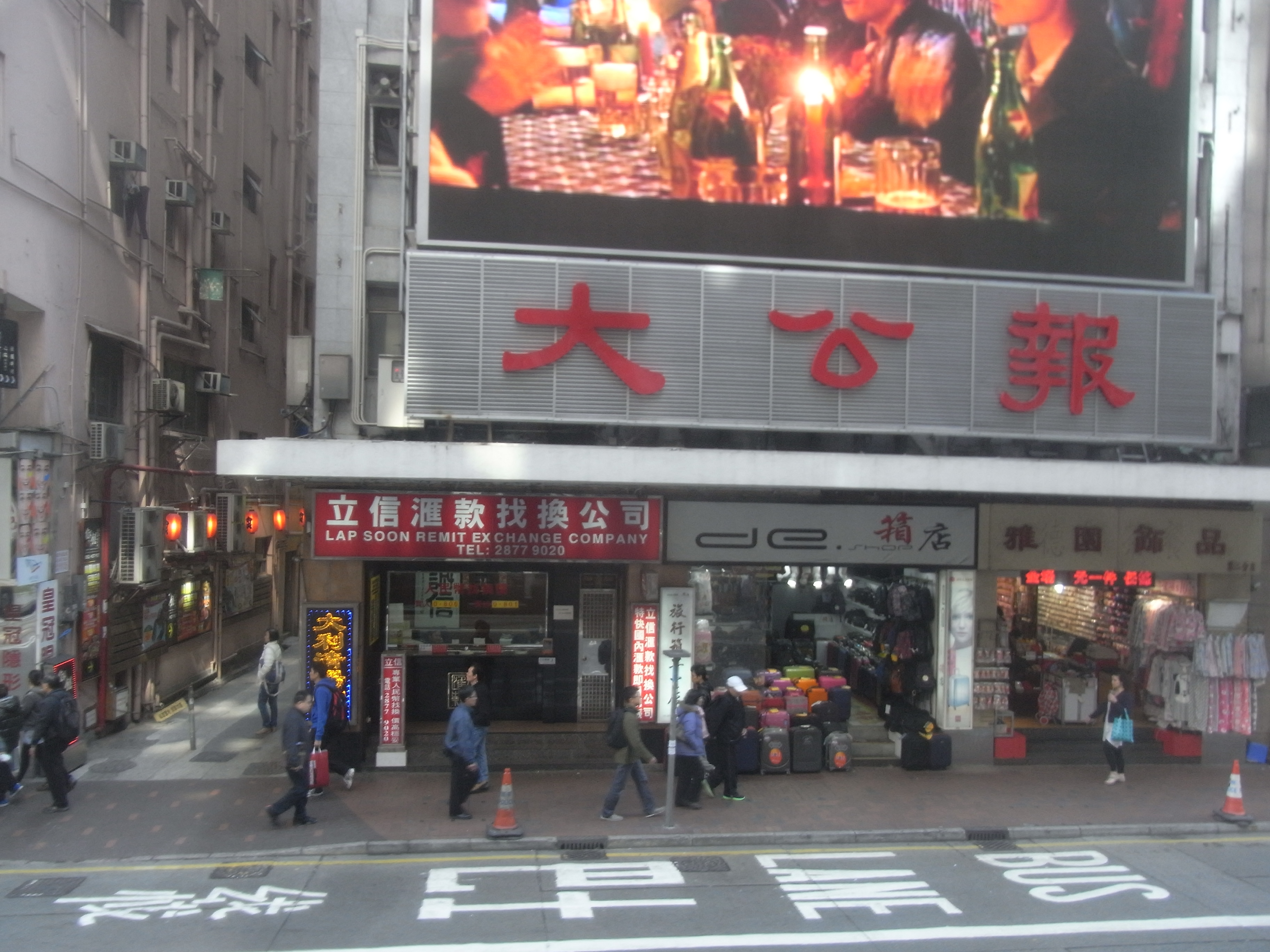
Office of Ta Kung Pao located on Hennessy Road, Wan Chai

The paper is state-owned, controlled by the Liaison Office of the Central Government in Hong Kong. The head office of Ta Kung Pao is located on Hennessy Road, Wan Chai, Hong Kong Island, with offices in mainland China, such as in Beijing, Shanghai, Tianjin, Inner-Mongolia and Guangzhou.

The paper's Asia-Pacific head office is in Hing Wai Centre (興偉中心), Tin Wan, Aberdeen, Hong Kong. Its China head office is in Chaoyang District, Beijing. Previously the head office was in Kodak House Phase 2 (柯達大廈二期), North Point, Hong Kong.

== See also ==
- Newspapers of Hong Kong
- Wen Wei Po
- The New Evening Post
- Yang Gang, a prominent female journalist for the paper
