= List of Chinese child actors =

This is a list of child actors from China. Films and/or television series they appeared in are mentioned only if they were still a child at the time of filming.

Current child actors (under the age of eighteen) are indicated by boldface.

== A ==
- Angelababy (born 1989)
  - 2006: Under The Lion Rock Band Cream
  - 2007: Trivial Matters

== C ==
- Jackie Chan (born 1954)
  - 1962: Big and Little Wong Tin Bar
  - 1963: The Golden Hairpin
  - 1964: Liang Shan Po and Chu Ying Tai
  - 1964: The Story of Qin Xiang Lin
  - 1966: The Eighteen Darts (Part 1)
  - 1966: The Eighteen Darts (Part 2)
  - 1966: Come Drink with Me
  - 1970: Lady of Steel
  - 1971: The Blade Spares None
  - 1971: The Angry River
  - 1972: Hapkido (also stuntman)
  - 1972: Fist of Fury (also stuntman)
  - 1972: The Brutal Boxer (also stuntman)
  - 1972: The Black Tavern
  - 1972: Stranger from Hong Kong (cameo)
- Paul Chun (born 1945)
  - 1949: Our Husband
  - 1949: A Forgotten Woman
  - 1953: Parents' Love
  - 1953: Green Heaven
  - 1953: A Song to Remember
  - 1956: The Orphan Girl
  - 1959: The Kingdom and the Beauty
  - 1960: Street Boy

== F ==
- Fan Bingbing (born 1981)
  - 1996: Powerful Woman
  - 1998-1999: My Fair Princess
  - 1998: Master Ma
  - 1998: The Scary Folktales - Black Moth
  - 1998: The Act of the Youngs
  - 1999: Master of Zen
  - 1999: Legend of Dagger Li
- Fung Bo-bo (born 1954)
  - 1956: Love vs Love
  - 1960: Blooming under a Cool Moon
  - 1960: The Great Devotion
  - 1960: The Orphan Saved Her Adoptive Mother
  - 1960: The Little Warrior in Red Butterfly
  - 1960: An Uncle's Sacrifice
  - 1960: The Stormy Night
  - 1960: The Simpletion and the Thief
  - 1960: Traitrous Queen
  - 1960: Awaiting the Return of the Prodigal at the Pavilion, Part II
  - 1961: Beggar King Saves The Prince
  - 1961: Little Cosmonaut
  - 1961: Little Go-Between
  - 1961: Little Matchmakers
  - 1961: Little Prime Minister
  - 1961: Little Orphan
  - 1961: Little White Golden Dragon
  - 1961: Lucky Child Granted By Heaven
  - 1961: Magic Cave
  - 1961: Magic Cup
  - 1961: One Who Saved All
  - 1961: Sorrowful Orphans
  - 1961: The Orphan's Adventure
  - 1961: Shadow of a Doubt
  - 1961: Valuable False Daughter
  - 1961: Wonder Boy
  - 1962: The Chase
  - 1962: The Drifting Orphan
  - 1962: Little Artists
  - 1962: Sad Tale of Two Women
  - 1962: Scarlet Boy
  - 1962: Little Twin Actresses
  - 1962: My Little Lucky Star
  - 1962: Puppet Princess
  - 1963: Little Dragon Girl Teases White Snake Spirit
  - 1963: The Purple Cup
  - 1964: My Darling Grandchild
  - 1965: The Invincible Kid Fang Shiyu
  - 1965: Pink Tears
  - 1965: Moonlight
  - 1965: The Twin Swords
  - 1965: Temple of the Red Lotus
  - 1965: The Skeleton Tower Under The Sea
  - 1967: The Sword and the Lute
  - 1967: The Horrifying Adventure of a Girl
  - 1970: The Lonely Rider

== G ==
- Ian Gouw (born 1997)
  - 2006: After This Our Exile
  - 2009: Astro Boy (Cantonese voice of Astro Boy)
- Guan Xiaotong (born 1997)
  - 2003: Profoundly Affecting
  - 2003: Nuan
  - 2004: Electric Shadows
  - 2004: True Love Forever
  - 2005: The Promise
  - 2006: Only Promises Keeps My Heart
  - 2007: Another Lifetime of Fate
  - 2007: The Shadow of Empress Wu
  - 2007: Beautiful Life
  - 2008: Uptown Girl and Donetown Girl
  - 2008: Save Me
  - 2009: The Treasure Hunter
  - 2009: Da Li Princess
  - 2010: Bridge of Life and Death
  - 2010: Spring Buds Blossoms
  - 2010: If You Are the One 2
  - 2011: The Vigilantes in Masks
  - 2011: Confucius
  - 2011: Summer's Latte Art (cameo)
  - 2012: Painted Skin: The Resurrection
  - 2012: Ocean Espionage
  - 2012: Mazu
  - 2013: 101 Times Confession
  - 2013: Flowers in Fog
  - 2013: Aftershock
  - 2013: Switch
  - 2013: Flash Play (cameo)
  - 2013: The Dance of the Summer (cameo)
  - 2013: Personal Tailor (cameo)
  - 2014: Romance of our Parents
  - 2014: May December Love
  - 2014: One Servant of Two Masters
  - 2014: Love at Jurrasic
  - 2015: The Wife's Lies (4 episodes)
  - 2015: Legend of Ban Shu
  - 2015: Pretty Wife
  - 2015: Joy Fans
  - 2015: Seventeen Blue
  - 2015: The Left Ear
  - 2015: Love of Magic
  - 2015: Roco Kingdom 4 (voice)
  - 2015: Romance Out of the Blue

== L ==
- Bruce Lee (1940-1973)
  - 1941: Golden Gate Girl
  - 1946: The Birth of Mankind
  - 1948: Wealth is Like a Dream
  - 1949: Sai See in the Dream
  - 1949: The Story of Fan Lei-fa
  - 1950: The Kid
  - 1950: Blooms and Butterflies
  - 1951: Infancy
  - 1953: A Myriad Homes
  - 1953: A Mother's Tears
  - 1953: In the Face of Demolition
  - 1953: The Guiding Light
  - 1953: Blame it on Father
  - 1955: Love
  - 1955: Love Part 2
  - 1955: An Orphan's Tragedy
  - 1955: Orphan's Song
  - 1955: The Faithful Wife
  - 1955: We Owe It to Our Children
  - 1956: The Wise Guys Who Fool Around
  - 1956: Too Late For Divorce
  - 1957: Darling Girl
  - 1957: The Thunderstorm
- **Lin Ziye** (born 2011)
  - 2023: My Journey to You
  - 2024: Fangs of Fortune
- Liu Shishi (born 1987)
  - 2004: Shao Bing – The Night of Falling Flowers (music video)
  - 2004: Shao Bing – When the Wind is the Coldest (music video)
  - 2005: The Moon and the Wind
- Turbo Liu (born 1997)
  - 2014: Beijing Love Story
  - 2015: Forever Young
  - 2015: Detective Chinatown

== S ==
- Shek Sau (born 1947)
  - 1958: Sword of Blood and Valour
  - 1959: Seven Swordsmen from Tianshan
  - 1959: A Sketch of Humanity
  - 1959: Story of the White-Haired Demon Girl Part 3
  - 1960: Parent's Love Part 1
  - 1961: The Seven Kids
  - 1961: The Miserable Mother
  - 1961: Father Is Back
- Lydia Shum (1945-2008)
  - 1960: Yi shu tao hua qian duo hong
  - 1961: Mang mu de ai qing
  - 1961: Huo ku you lan
  - 1962: Hong lou meng
  - 1962: Xi shi zhong zhong
  - 1963: Feng huan chao
  - 1963: Yang Nai Wu yu Xiao Bai Cai
- Song Zu'er (born 1998)
  - 2005: Love of Fate
  - 2005: Secret Order 1949
  - 2005: The Sea and Sky Boundless
  - 2007: You Are An Angel
  - 2009: Prelude of Lotus Lantern
  - 2009: Wu Liang Tian
  - 2013: Lucky Rabbit Spirit
  - 2016: Papa

== W ==
- Wang Baoqiang (born 1984)
  - 2001: Big Shot's Funeral
  - 2002: Seventh Imperial Envoy Liu Luoguo
- Wang Junkai (born 1999)
  - 2015: Pound of Flesh (cameo)
  - 2015: Mr. Six (cameo)
  - 2016: Finding Soul
  - 2016: The Great Wall (cameo)
  - 2016: Noble Aspirations (2 episodes)
  - 2016: Love for Separation (3 episodes)
  - 2017: Boy Hood (2 episodes)
  - 2017: Namiya
- Roy Wang (born 2000)
  - 2015: Pound of Flesh (cameo)
  - 2015: Mr. Six (cameo)
  - 2016: Finding Soul
  - 2016: L.O.R.D: Legend of Ravaging Dynasties
  - 2016: Noble Aspirations (2 episodes)
  - 2016: Love for Separation (3 episodes)
  - 2017: Boy Hood (2 episodes)
  - 2018: Eagles and Youngster
- Wen Junhui (born 1996)
  - 2002: Give Me Folly
  - 2002: Special Police Dragon
  - 2004: Cross Border Daddy
  - 2005: Go! Go! Daddy
  - 2006: The Pye Dog
  - 2010: Drunk Red Crust
  - 2010: The Legend Is Born: Ip Man
  - 2010: Who's the Hero (cameo)
  - 2013: Children's War
  - 2013: My Mother
- Wen Zhang (born 1984)
  - 2000: Bloom of Youth
  - 2001: Black Triangle

== X ==
- Xu Jiao (born 1997)
  - 2008: CJ7
  - 2009: Mulan
  - 2009: Astro Boy (Chinese voice of Astro Boy)
  - 2010: Just Another Pandora's Box
  - 2010: Future X-Cops
  - 2010: The Legend Is Born – Ip Man
  - 2011: Starry Starry Night
  - 2011: The Warring States
  - 2012: Wu Dang
  - 2012: Promise Time
  - 2013: Mr. Go
  - 2013: Rhythm of the Rain
  - 2014: Dragon Nest: Warriors' Dawn (voice)
  - 2015: The Strange House
  - 2015: CJ7: Super Q Team (voice)

== Y ==
- Yang Mi (born 1986)
  - 1990: Tang Ming Huang
  - 1992: King of Beggars
  - 1993: Heroes' Calamities
  - 1993: Monkey Doll
  - 1997: Singer
  - 2004: The Story of a Noble Family
  - 2004: Shuang Xiang Pao
- Yang Zi (born 1992)
  - 2002: The Party Member Ma Dajie
  - 2002: Ru Ci Chu Shan
  - 2003: Xiaozhuang Epic
  - 2003: The Grand Mansion Gate (1 episode)
  - 2003: The Law of Romance
  - 2004: Crime Scene
  - 2004: Jia Ting Dang An
  - 2004: Yong Gan Mian Dui
  - 2004: Girl's Diary
  - 2004: Lao Fei
  - 2004: An Old Record
  - 2004: Dad Wants to Divorce
  - 2004: The Quiet Lady
  - 2005-2006: Home with Kids
  - 2005: Girl's Diary
  - 2005: Young Kangxi
  - 2005: Fate
  - 2006: No Limit
  - 2006: Not Easy to Grow Up
  - 2007: Warmth
  - 2007: The Last Fragrance
  - 2008: I Am a Fan
  - 2008: Being Alive is Good
  - 2008: Treasure
  - 2009: Girl Rushes Forward
  - 2009: Don't Want to Grow Up
  - 2009: Stage of Youth
  - 2009: Coming Home
  - 2009: Chun Zhen Sui Yue
  - 2009: Mo's Mischief: Teacher's Pet (voice)
  - 2009: Ma-Mha (Chinese voice)
  - 2010: Boy and Girl
  - 2010: Money Makes Trouble
  - 2010: Third Class Fifth Class
  - 2010: Death and Glory in Changde
  - 2010: Boy's Diary
  - 2010: Wu Cheng'en and Journey to the West
- Jackson Yee (born 2000)
  - 2010: Iron Pear
  - 2011: Super Equipment Kids
  - 2013: The Legend of Yunchu Temple
  - 2013: Keep Up (short film)
  - 2013: Snail (short film)
  - 2014: Hi-Tech Belle (cameo)
  - 2014: Surprise Season 2 (cameo)
  - 2015: Pound of Flesh (cameo)
  - 2015: Mr. Six (cameo)
  - 2015: The Little Prince (Mandarin voice of the Little Prince)
  - 2016: Finding Soul
  - 2016: A Love for Separation (3 episodes)
  - 2016: Noble Aspirations (6 episodes)
  - 2017: Song of Phoenix (12 episodes)
  - 2017: Boy Hood (2 episodes)
  - 2017: GG Bond: Guarding (voice)
  - 2018: Eagles and Youngster

== Z ==
- Lay Zhang (born 1991)
  - 1998: We The People
- Zhang Xueying (born 1997)
  - 2004: 281 Letters
  - 2005: Hero During Yongle Period
  - 2005: Strange Tales of Liao Zhai
  - 2005: Fu Gui
  - 2005: Daming Qicai
  - 2006: Kungfu Champion
  - 2006: Hong Hai'er
  - 2006: Yang Naiwu and Xiao Baicai
  - 2006: Founding Emperor of Ming Dynasty
  - 2006: Winter Fairytale
  - 2006: Fearless
  - 2007: Flower And Chess
  - 2007: Da Juyuan
  - 2007: Powder Purple Ink
  - 2007: The Legend and the Hero
  - 2007: Chuan Zheng Feng Yun
  - 2007: Big Shot
  - 2008: Ning Wei Nu Ren
  - 2008: The Legend of the Condor Heroes
  - 2008: Paladins in Troubled Times
  - 2008: Red Begonia
  - 2009: Feng Yatou
  - 2009: Rose Martial World
  - 2009: Lurk
  - 2009: Love Blooming
  - 2009: Dad Wake Me Up When It Is Morning
  - 2010: Beauty's Rival in Palace
  - 2010: Detective
  - 2010: Xin An Family
  - 2011: A Cheng of Genesis
  - 2011: Windmill
  - 2011: I Am Your Son
  - 2011: Daughter
  - 2012: Time Flies Soundlessly
  - 2012: In Love with Power
  - 2013: Swordsman
  - 2013: Chuan Yue Feng Huo Xian
  - 2014: The Romance of the Condor Heroes
  - 2014: The Great Love of A Policewoman
  - 2015: Lovers & Movies
  - 2015: Songs From Battlefields
  - 2015: Ancient Mirror
  - 2015: The Whirlwind Girl
  - 2015: Love Yunge from the Desert
  - 2015: Legend of Ban Shu
- Zhang Zifeng (born 2001)
  - 2008: Peace Is Blessing
  - 2008: Computer Kids
  - 2008: The Judge Who Resolves Family Disputes
  - 2008: Rather Be a Woman
  - 2009: Local Wives, Migrant Husbands
  - 2009: Invincible Love
  - 2009: Dragon Beard Ditch
  - 2009: Secret Train
  - 2009: Wushu
  - 2010: Aftershock
  - 2010: I Want a Home
  - 2010: You Are My Life
  - 2010: Mom, I Love You
  - 2011: My Father's Name Is Bench
  - 2011: Emotions War
  - 2012: Dad Come Home
  - 2012: Healing Hands
  - 2012: Happiness Blossom
  - 2012: Back to 1942
  - 2012: Baby Don't Cry
  - 2013: Better and Better
  - 2013: The Palace
  - 2013: Fake Fiction
  - 2013: Longmen Express
  - 2013: Shining Days
  - 2014: Hero in a Mask
  - 2014: My Old Classmate
  - 2015: Detective Chinatown
  - 2016: Phantom of the Theatre
  - 2016: A Love for Separation
  - 2017: Boyhood
  - 2017: Inference Notes
  - 2017: How Are You
  - 2017: Invisible TA
  - 2018: One and Another Him
  - 2018: Go Brother!
  - 2018: Last Letter
  - 2019: Desire Game
  - 2019: Adoring
  - 2019: Begin, Again
  - 2019: My People, My Country
- Zhang Ziyi (born 1979)
  - 1996: Touching Starlight
- Zhou Xun (born 1974)
  - 1991: Inside an Old Grave
