= High Forces =

2024 Hong Kong film by Oxide Pang

- Theatrical release poster

Chinese name
- Traditional Chinese: 危機航綫
- Simplified Chinese: 危机航线
- Literal meaning: Crisis Ground Track
Transcriptions
Standard Mandarin
- Hanyu Pinyin: Wéi Jī Háng Xiàn
Yue: Cantonese
- Jyutping: Ngai4 Gei1 Hong4 Sin3
- Directed by: Oxide Pang; Law Chi-leung
- Written by: Sun Chan; Bai Yu
- Produced by: Andy Lau; Alvin Lam
- Starring: Andy Lau; Zhang Zifeng; Qu Chuxiao; Liu Tao
- Cinematography: William Chan Wai-Lin
- Edited by: Eric Kwong Chi-Leung; Oxide Pang
- Music by: Anthony Chue Chan-Tung
- Production companies: Universe Entertainment; Focus Films; Tianjin Maoyan Weiying Culture Media; Yingming Culture Communication; Shanghai Tao Piao Piao Movie & TV Culture; Sun Entertainment Culture; Universe Matrix Century Films Distribution (Beijing) Company; Universe Films Distribution
- Distributed by: Universe Films Distribution (Hong Kong, Worldwide); Intercontinental Film Distributors (HK) (Hong Kong)
- Release dates: 30 September 2024 (China); 10 October 2024 (Hong Kong)
- Running time: 115 minutes
- Countries: Hong Kong; China
- Language: Mandarin
- Box office: $41.6 million

High Forces, formerly known as Crisis Route, is a 2024 Hong Kong-Chinese action film directed by Oxide Pang and Law Chi-leung, produced by Andy Lau, and starring Lau, Zhang Zifeng, and Qu Chuxiao. Lau plays an international security expert who combats against hijackers on board the Airbus A380.

The film was first announced in March 2020 and production officially began on 27 September 2021 and ended on 19 November 2021. High Forces was theatrically released on 10 October 2024.

== Plot ==
Gao Haojun is an international security expert working for Hangyu Airlines (HYA) run by CEO Li Hangyu. Years ago, during a traffic jam, a severe episode of mania led to a car accident that caused his daughter, Gao Xiaojun, to lose her eyesight. Haojun's condition didn't improve, and later, he was even detained for fighting. His family fell apart - his wife, Fu Yuan, left him, taking their daughter with her, leaving Haojun overwhelmed with guilt.

Haojun boards the maiden flight of the airline's Airbus A380. There, he unexpectedly crosses paths with his ex-wife and daughter as he boarded the luxurious aircraft. On the mid-flight, twelve hijackers led by Mike begin to take the passengers at the first class section where Yuan, Xiaojun, and Hangyu boarded and starts killing the passengers randomly. A pilot who is Mike's accomplice kills the co-pilot. Using Hangyu as a leverage, Mike demands Hangyu's wife, airline president Liu, to transfer US$ 500 million into his account in 30 minutes in exchange for her husband's life. Liu summons HYA's Vice President of Finance Chen Jie to handle the situation. However, Chen Jie and other employees of HYA are revealed to be conspiring with Mike, whom he plans to settle Chen Jie's gambling debt using embezzled money from the airline fund.

Haojun, who is seated at the economy class, goes to investigate after something amiss on the flight. Quietly communicating with Xiaojun (who is not aware that the caller is her father) on a toy walkie-talkie, Haojun confirms that the flight is hijacked. Using both his intellect and physical prowess, Haojun kills the hijackers on his way and finds the bag of parachutes, which would be used to escape the plane once they got the money, and destroys some of it. Mike realises Haojun has done it and orders his men to storm the economy class and takes them hostage, using a leverage to lure Haojun out. Haojun finally acknowledges Xiaojun as his father talking on her and vows to stay with her and her mother until the situation is over. After a gunfight with Mike, Haojun rescues his family and hides them in the crawl space before rescuing a wounded Hangyu. Chen Jie, who is about to be eliminated to tie loose ends, is eventually arrested.

Ordered by Haojun, Hangyu kills the hijacker pilot and retakes the cockpit. Yuan and Xiaojun are recaptured, and Haojun surrenders to Mike. Mike opens the door in attempt to escape, causing an uncontrolled decompression and disabling one engine. In the ensuing chaos, Xiaojun and Haojun are almost suck out of the plane. Flight attendant Fiona, who is a trained skydiver, rescues Xiaojun and parachutes to the ground. Haojun kills Mike and throws him out of the plane.

With the landing gear fails to deploy, Hangyu forces the plane to make an emergency landing on a highway using a specialised truck. Haojun reconciles with his ex-wife and daughter in the aftermath of the incident. The closing epilogue states that Haojun was officially recognized as an act of bravery for stopping the hijackers whereas Chen Jie and his other accomplices who impersonated police officers were sentenced to life imprisonment.

== Cast ==
- Andy Lau as Gao Haojun (高皓軍), an international security expert who has mania.
- Zhang Zifeng as Gao Xiaojun (高小軍), Gao's 18-year-old blind daughter who has great observation skills despite her disability.
- Qu Chuxiao as Mike, the leader of the hijackers.
- Liu Tao as Fu Yuan (傅源), Gao's ex-wife and Xiaojun's mother.
- Guo Xiaodong as Li Hangyu (李航宇), CEO of Hangyu Airlines.
- Jiang Mengjie
- Jiang Chao
- Gao Shuguang
- Wang Longzheng
- Eric Chou
- Zhang Yao
- Zhang Yang

== Production ==
Universe Entertainment chairman Daneil Lam first announced the film in March 2020, where it was titled A380, and was in talks with Andy Lau to star while production was set to begin in summer of the year.

On 9 March 2021, it was announced that Lau would be starring in the film as well as serving as producer, with Alvin Lam as co-producing and Oxide Pang directing. Liu Tao and Zhang Zifeng were also confirmed to be participating in the film, respectively playing the wife and daughter of Lau's character. With the film's title changed to Crisis Route, production was set to begin in early September of the year.

Principal photography for the film officially began on 27 September 2021, which was also Lau's 60th birthday, in Qingdao. The film held a production commencement ceremony that day as well as a birthday celebration for Lau. An interactive teaser poster was released which features a QR code when scanned with a cellular phone, an announcement of a plane hijacking can heard spoken by actor Guo Xiaodong, who plays a CEO of an airline company in the film. Being the first Chinese-language film to feature the interior of the Airbus A380, the film reportedly spent HK$300 million to build a 1:1 replica of the aircraft.

Production for Crisis Route officially wrapped up on 19 November 2021.

The film released new posters at the 2023 Hong Kong Film & TV Market (FILMART) showcasing its new English title, High Forces.

== Release ==
High Forces was theatrically released on 10 October 2024 in Hong Kong.

== Reception ==
=== Box office ===
In Hong Kong, the film debuted at No. 6 during its opening weekend, grossing HK$1,852,858 (US$188,839) during its first four days of release including previews.In its second weekend, the film grossed HK$1,528,653 (US$196,722), moving up to No. 2, and have grossed a total of HK$3,381,511 (US$435,166) by then. During its third weekend, the film grossed HK$918,124 (US$118,161), coming in at No. 3, while having accumulated a total gross of HK$4,713,676 (US$606,641) so far. In its fourth weekend, the film grossed HK$282,801 (US$36,364), coming in at No. 8, while having accumulated a total gross of HK$4,996,477 (US$642,470) so far.

In China, the film grossed US$25.2 million in its opening weekend, debuting at No. 5. In its second weekend, the film group US$8.4 million, moving up to No. 3, while having grossed a total of US$33.6 million by then. The film remained at No. 3 during its third weekend grossing US$5.9 million while having accumulated a total gross of US$39.5 million by the . In its fourth weekend, the film grossed US$2.7 million, coming in at No. 6, and have grossed a total of US$42.3 million so far.

=== Critical reception ===
Edmund Lee of the South China Morning Post gave the film a score of 2/5 stars, calling it "a bizarrely conceived, if also intermittently entertaining action thriller" while criticizing the logic of the screenplay and premise and writes, "as an action icon who often also backs himself in a co-producer capacity, Lau should better realise that the idiotic stories he fronts are eating into his star image."

== See also ==
- Andy Lau filmography
