= Shining Days =

Shining Days may refer to:

- Shining☆Days (episode), the finale of the My-HiME anime series
- Shining☆Days (single) by Minami Kuribayashi
- 闪亮的日子, a 2009 Chinese TV series starring Bianca Bai
- 璀璨人生, a 2013 Chinese TV series with 80 episodes, also known as Cui Can Ren Sheng and Brilliant Days.

== See also ==
- Our Shining Days, a Chinese film
- Shiny Days (disambiguation)
