= Xu Lu =

Chinese actress

- Xu in Destiny's Love (2019)
- Born: December 28, 1994 (age 31); Hohhot, Inner Mongolia, China
- Other name: Lulu Xu
- Education: People's Liberation Army Academy of Art
- Occupation: Actress
- Years active: 2010–present
- Agent: Xu Lu Studio

Xu Lu (Chinese: 徐璐, born 28 December 1994), also known as Lulu Xu, is a Chinese actress and singer. She first became recognized in China for her role in the drama Empresses in the Palace (2012) and internationally with the drama One and a Half Summer (2014) and Love Scenery (2021).

== Career ==
Xu Lu has been educated at a military school since she was 10 years old, which then propelled her to attend People's Liberation Army Academy of Art, majoring in drama. She debuted as an actress through The Dream of Red Mansions as the teenage Xue Baoqin. But her breakthrough came with Empresses in the Palace. Even though her character Zhen Yurao only started to appear in the latter part of drama, she captivated the viewers with her fresh innocent look and her romantic subplot with Aisin-Gioro Yunxi.

She became known internationally by starring in a college romance drama, One and a Half Summer alongside Nichkhun and Jiang Jinfu. In 2015, Xu Lu participated in the 1st season of We Are in Love, the licensed remake of popular South Korean's variety show We Got Married, in which her virtual pairing with Qiao Renliang gained huge popularity up until Qiao's death in September 2016.

Among her projects in 2017 were director Guan Hu's adaptation of Ghost Blows Out the Light book series, The Weasel Grave; big budget fantasy Tribes and Empires: Storm of Prophecy; and youth musical film Our Shining Days, which she was awarded for at the Shanghai International Film Festival.

One of her works in 2019 is period piece Spy Hunter by the acclaimed director-writer duo Li Lu (In the Name of People) and Zhang Yong (The Disguiser). For historical series The Longest Day in Chang'an, she has joined the list of actresses who have portrayed Yang Guifei, a famous historical figure and one of the Four Beauties of ancient China.

== Filmography ==
=== Film ===
Year	English title	Chinese title	Role	Notes
2016	The Light	减法人生	Yan Dan	
2017	Our Shining Days	闪光少女	Chen Jing	
2021	Candle in the Tomb: The Weasel Grave	黄皮幽冢	Hua Mei	Support role

=== Television series ===
Year	English title	Chinese title	Role	Network	Notes
2003	Secret Murder, Amazing Cases	无敌县令	Dong Yufeng		Support role
2010	The Dream of Red Mansions	红楼梦	teenage Xue Baoqin	Beijing Media Network	
2012	The Sheng Tian Men Gate	圣天门口2	teenage Li Xuening	Anhui TV	
2012	Modern Family	摩登女婿	Hu Xiaoya	Hunan TV	
2012	Empresses in the Palace	甄嬛传	Zhen Yurao	Dragon TV	
2013	Love in Spring	爱在春天	Jin Lulu	Hunan TV	
2013	Warring States Little Soldier	大兵小将	Li Yu	Shanghai TV	
2014	One and a Half Summer	一又二分之一的夏天	Luo Man	Dragon TV	
2014	The Gold Matchmaker	金牌红娘	Jin Linglong	Tencent	
2015	Singles Villa	只因单身在一起	Jiang Kexin	Hunan TV	
2015	The Wife's Lies	妻子的謊言	Sun Jiayuan	Hunan TV	
2016	Magical Space-time	奇妙的时光之旅	Song Qiaoqiao	Hunan TV	
2017	Be with You	不得不爱	Lin Weiling	iQIYI	
2017	The Weasel Grave	鬼吹灯之黄皮子坟	Hua Mei	Tencent	
2017	Tribes and Empires: Storm of Prophecy	九州·海上牧云记	Su Yuning	iQIYI, Tencent, Youku	
2018	Prince Coffee Lab	高兴遇见你	Gao Xing (Happy)	Tencent	
2018	Speed	极速青春	Tang Tang	Dragon TV	
2019	Spy Hunter	天衣无缝	Gui Wan	Jiangsu TV, Zhejiang TV	
2019	Destiny's Love	爱上北斗星男友	Wen Suxi	iQIYI	
2019	The Longest Day in Chang'an	长安十二时辰	Yang Guifei (Yang Yuhuan)	Youku	Cameo
2020	In Your Own Hands	人生算什麼	Guo Ruian		Cameo
2020	The Message	风声	Gu Xiaomeng	BTV, Tencent	
2021	Love Scenery	良辰美景好时光	Liang Chen	iQIYI, Tencent, Youku	
2021	Sunshine of My Life	若你安好便是晴天	Mo Fei	Dragon TV	
2021	Stray Birds	飞鸟集	Su Xiaoman	Mango TV	
2022	Gentleman of East 8th	东八区的先生们	(Teacher)	Mango TV, Tencent	Cameo
2022	Are You Safe	你安全吗	Mu Tong	Tencent	Support role
2022	Women Walk the Line	我們的當打之年	Gu Xiao	Tencent	
2022	Song of the Moon	月歌行	Liu Xiao	iQIYI	
2023	Egg and Stone	少女闯江湖	Huo Xingchen	iQIYI	
2023	Hello, I'm at Your Service	金牌客服董董恩	Dong Dongen	iQIYI	
2024	Lady Revenger Returns from the Fire	披荆斩棘的大小姐	Luo Ailian / Shen Danqing	Tencent	
2024	Treasures Around	珠玉在侧	Shan Dandan	Tencent	
2025	Dream Beyond	我的世界你好	Gu Nian	Dragon TV	
2025	Zhen Di	阵地	Ren Suning	CCTV-1	
2025	The Vendetta of An	长安二十四计	Bai Guan	Youku	
TBA	Legend of Ink Painting	墨客行	Bai Mengmeng	Zhejiang TV	
TBA	Thirteen-Hongs in Canton	广州十三行	Yun Niang	iQIYI	Support role

=== Variety show ===
Year	English title	Chinese title	Role	Network	Notes
2015	We Are in Love	约吧大明星	Cast member	Jiangsu Television	with Qiao Renliang
2016	Date ! Super Star	约吧！大明星	Cast member	Tencent	with Ethan Juan, Huang Jingyu, Vision Wei
2019	Meeting Mr. Right	女儿们的恋爱	Cast member	Mango TV	with Zhang Ming'en

== Discography ==
Year	English title	Chinese title	Album
2014	"One and a Half Summer"	一又二分之一的夏天	One and a Half Summer OST
2016	"It's Okay"	没关系	The Light OST
2016	"Date ! Super Star"	約吧！大明星	Date ! Super Star OST
2017	"Show Me !"	—N/a	Our Shining Days OST
2017	"Flying Star'"	飞散的星星	Our Shining Days OST
2017	"LULU"	—N/a	Birthday single

== Awards and nominations ==
Year	Award	Category	Nominated work	Result	Ref.
2012	Top Travel Ceremony	Trendy Celebrity Blogger	—N/a	Won	
2015	4th iQiyi All-Star Carnival Night	Best Character Portrayal	One and a Half Summer	Won	
2017	20th Shanghai International Film Festival	Best Actress (Asian New Talent Award)	Our Shining Days	Nominated	
2017	14th China Movie Channel Media Awards	Best Actress	Our Shining Days	Runner-up	
2017	14th China Movie Channel Media Awards	Best New Actress	Our Shining Days	Won	
2017	12th Chinese Young Generation Film Forum Awards	Best New Actress	Our Shining Days	Nominated	
2017	11th Tencent Video Star Awards	Breakthrough Film Actress	Our Shining Days	Won	
2017	Toutiao Awards	Dynamic Star of the Year	—N/a	Won	
2017	The Belt and Road International Fashion Week 2017: The Most Credible Award	Influential Young Actor Award	—N/a	Won	
2018	China Screen Ranking	Newcomer of the Year	—N/a	Won	
2018	9th China Film Director's Guild Awards	Best Actress	Our Shining Days	Nominated	
2018	23rd Huading Awards	Best Newcomer	Our Shining Days	Nominated	
2018	14th Chinese American Film Festival, Golden Angel Award	Best New Actress	Our Shining Days	Won	
2018	InStyle Icon Awards	Most Anticipated Icon of the Year	—N/a	Won	
2018	iFeng Fashion Choice Awards	Fashion Prize	—N/a	Won	
2019	Golden Bud – The Fourth Network Film And Television Festival	Best Actress	Spy Hunter, Destiny's Love, The Longest Day in Chang'an	Nominated	
2019	Golden Bud – The Fourth Network Film And Television Festival	Rising Actress of the Year	Spy Hunter, Destiny's Love, The Longest Day in Chang'an	Won	
