= Hao Fushen =

Chinese actor

- Born: 17 November 1999 (age 26); Dalian, Liaoning, China
- Education: Beijing Film Academy
- Occupation: Actor
- Years active: 2019–present

Chinese name
- Traditional Chinese: 郝富申
- Simplified Chinese: 郝富申
Transcriptions
Standard Mandarin
- Hanyu Pinyin: Hǎo Fùshēn

Hao Fushen (Chinese: 郝富申, born 17 November 1999) is a Chinese actor.

== Early life and education ==
Hao was born in Dalian, Liaoning on November 17, 1999. He enrolled in Beijing Film Academy in the year 2017.

The actors that Hao admires are Peng Yuchang and Masaki Suda.

== Career ==
=== 2019–present: Beginnings ===
In 2019, Hao made his acting debut in the drama series Our Shiny Days.

In 2020, Hao starred in the drama Hikaru No Go, based on the Japanese manga series.

== Filmography ==
=== Television series ===
Year	English title	Chinese title	Role	Notes/Ref.
2019	Our Shiny Days	闪光少女	Li You	
2020	Hikaru No Go	棋魂	Yu Liang	
2021	Zuo Meng Ba! Jing Jing	做梦吧！晶晶		
TBA	Ni Shi Nian Shao De Huan Xi	你是年少的欢喜	Chu Tian	
TBA	Bright Time	芥子时光	Lan Jing Hui	

== Awards and nominations ==
Year	Award	Category	Nominated work	Result	Ref.
2020	2020 Sina Fashion Style Awards	Best New Actor of The Year	—N/a	Won	
