= Back to Field =

Chinese television program

- Back to Field Official Logo Poster
- Traditional Chinese: 向往的生活
- Simplified Chinese: 向往的生活
- Hanyu Pinyin: Xiàngwǎng de shēnghuó
- Genre: Reality show
- Directed by: Wang Zhengyu
- Starring: Huang Lei; He Jiong; Peng Yuchang; Zhang Zifeng; Lay Zhang
- Country of origin: China
- Original language: Standard Chinese
- No. of seasons: 7
- No. of episodes: 82

Production
- Camera setup: Multicamera setup
- Running time: 80 minutes
- Production company: Hunan Broadcasting System

Original release
- Network: Hunan Television
- Release: 15 January 2017 – present

Back to Field (Chinese: 向往的生活; pinyin: Xiàngwǎng de shēnghuó) is a Chinese reality show on Hunan TV. The show documents the simplistic lifestyle of living away from the bustling city centers.

== Format ==
Each season takes place in a different rural part of China. The cast members are only provided with the basic life necessities and have to take care of everything else such as cooking their own meals and building their own furniture. To "buy" different cooking ingredients and other tools, they have to complete certain tasks assigned by the production crew, such as planting and harvesting crops. Different guests join the cast in each episode and help out with the daily chores. The goal of the program is to bring the audience along on a slower pace of life and to illustrate the joys of a simple lifestyle.

== Members ==
=== Cast ===
Name	Age	Duration
Huang Lei	51	Season 1 – 7
He Jiong	49	Season 1 – 7
Henry Lau	34	Season 1 – 2
Peng Yuchang	28	Season 2 – 6
Zhang Zifeng	22	Season 3 – 6
Lay Zhang	32	Season 5 – 6

=== Animals ===
English name	Chinese name	Pinyin	Species	Notes
H	爱吃	Ai Chi	Shiba Inu	
Little Yellow	小黄	Xiǎo huáng	Chicken	Did not appear in the third season
Little Flower	小花	Xiǎohuā	Chicken	Did not appear in the third season
Little White	小白	Xiǎo bái	Chicken	Did not appear in the third season
Little	点点	Diǎndiǎn	Goat	
Tianba	天霸	Tiān bà	Goat	Named by Chen He
Nicholas Deng	彩灯	Cǎi dēng	Muscovy Duck	
O			Shiba Inu	Joined in S02E00
12 little yellow ducks	12隻小黃鴨	12 Zhī xiǎo huáng yā	Ducks	Joined in S02E05, brought by Batu
Susu	苏苏	Sūsū	Cow	Joined in S03E00
Pot	锅	Guō	Shiba Inu	Joined in S03E00, children of H and O, adopted by Zhang Zifeng
Bowl	碗	Wǎn	Shiba Inu	Joined in S03E00, children of H and O, adopted by Victoria Song
Ladle	瓢	Piáo	Shiba Inu	Joined in S03E00, children of H and O, adopted by Wang Luodan
Basin	盆	Pén	Shiba Inu	Joined in S03E00, children of H and O, adopted by Zhang Jike
Little Guy	小不点	Xiǎobudiǎn	Goat	Was born in S03E06
Dongba	动霸	Dòngbà	Turtle	Joined in S04E07, brought by Chen He
Tua			Turtle	Joined in S04E12, brought by Chen He

== Episodes ==
=== Season 1 ===
Season 1 was filmed in Huayuan Village, Xinchengzi Town, Miyun District, Beijing, with He Jiong, Huang Lei, and Henry Lau as the main hosts. This show was initially called 一仆二主 or One Servant, Two Masters and the original broadcasting platform for the show was Dragon Television. However, due to unsatisfactory results of the program's investment promotion, Dragon TV planned to intervene in the program's production process, resulting in a disagreement between the producer, Hexin Media, and Dragon TV. Dragon TV finally gave up the broadcasting rights of the program and the producer suspended the recording of the program after the sixth episode. Subsequently, with the strong support of He Jiong, Hunan TV obtained the rights to broadcast the program. The pilot aired on 8 January 2017, and the season premiered on 15 January and concluded on 16 April.

Episode #	Broadcast date	Guests	Title	Notes
S1E00	8 January 2017	No guests	Pilot	
S1E01	15 January 2017	Song Dandan, Batu		
S1E02	22 January 2017	Wang Zhonglei, Winnie, Chen He		
S1E03	29 January 2017	Chen He		
S1E04	5 February 2017	Hui Ruoqi, Ding Xia, Yuan Xinyue, Hai Qing, Li Jie, Yang Dong, Zeng Hui, Wang Qing		
S1E05	12 February 2017	Hai Qing, Li Jie, Yang Dong, Zeng Hui, Wang Qing		
S1E06	19 February 2017	Da Zhangwei		
S1E07	26 February 2017	Dong Zijian, Xie Yilin, Chen Duling		
S1E08	5 March 2017	Dong Zijian, Xie Yilin, Chen Duling		
S1E09	12 March 2017	Li Bingbing, Ren Quan		
S1E10	19 March 2017	Li Bingbing, Ren Quan, Wei Daxun, Yang Di, Wang Qian		
S1E11	26 March 2017	Wei Daxun, Yang Di, Wang Qian, Bai Baihe		
S1E12	2 April 2017	Bai Baiehe, Xie Na		
S1E13	9 April 2017	Xie Na, Zhao Liying, Sun Honglei		
S1E14	16 April 2017	Xie Na, Zhao Liying		

=== Season 2 ===
Actor Peng Yuchang joins the permanent cast in season 2. Filming began on 13 March 2018, in Heling Village, Jiuxian Subdistrict, Tonglu County, Hangzhou, Zhejiang. The pilot was broadcast on 13 April 2018, and the season premiered on 20 April 2018, and concluded on 6 July 2018.

Episode #	Broadcast date	Guests	Title	Notes
S2E00	13 April 2018	No guests	Pilot	Henry was unavailable for filming
S2E01	20 April 2018	Xu Zheng, Hui Wangyan, Huang Yinuo, Wang Yuanhui	When was the last time you washed your hair?	Huang Yinuo and Wang Yuanhui did not stay the night; Henry returned at the end of the episode
S2E02	28 April 2018	Zhang Jie, Jin Wenqi	Gradually, you've grown up	
S2E03	4 May 2018	Zhang Shaogang, Li Dan, Chi Zi	We are all naughty	
S2E04	11 May 2018	Li Xiaoran, Pan Yueming	Sound and silence are parts of life	
S2E05	18 May 2018	Zhang Zifeng, Batu, Wang Luodan, Song Dandan, Zhao Baogang	A day without a cook	Zhao Baogang did not stay the night but returned in S2E06
S2E06	25 May 2018	Qi Wei	Follow your dream in the entertainment circle	
S2E07	1 June 2018	Qi Wei, Tong Liya,	We're not teenagers any more when we meet again	Tong Liya arrived late in the day and missed the previous episode
S2E08	8 June 2018	Liu Guoliang, Han Tianyu, Wu Dajing	Friends who like barbecue	
S2E09	15 June 2018	Sha Yi, Shen Yue, Chen Duling	Watch the rainbow with you	
S2E10	22 June 2018	Wu Yingjie, Yu Wenwen, Mao Buyi, Liu Wei, An Yuexi, Chen Ziyou, Zhao Chengyu, Liu Chunyan	A normal day	
S2E11	23 June 2018	Huang Bo, Yu Hewei, Wang Xun	A good show, invisible guests	
S2E12	29 June 2018	Huang Bo, Yu Hewei, Wang Xun	Quite a good show	
S2E13	30 June 2018	Angelababy, Ni Ni, Lü Siqing	Finally you came	Wang Xun decided to stay another day, Lü Siqing did not stay the night
S2E14	6 July 2018	Angelababy, Ni Ni	We are all afraid of being lonely	

=== Season 3 ===
Actress Zhang Zifeng joins the permanent cast in season 3, while Henry Lau announced on his personal Weibo that he will be withdrawing from the show and pivoting his focus towards music. In addition to exploring the simplicity and tranquility of the countryside lifestyle, the theme of the show, season 3 added a separate plot line revolving around the research on rural conditions. The project is jointly completed by the program team and experts and scholars from Peking University, Renmin University of China, and Beijing Normal University. The three dimensions of "current situation and advantages," "problems and dilemmas," and "countermeasures and suggestions" was taken as the overarching framework. Filming began on 19 March 2019, in Wengcao Village, Morong Town, Guzhang County, Hunan Province. The pilot aired on 19 April 2019, and the season premiered on 26 April 2019, and concluded on 19 July 2019.

Episode #	Broadcast date	Guests	Title	Notes
S3E00	19 April 2019	No guests	Dear Henry	Henry Lau leaves the cast this season, and Zhang Zifeng joins as a new cast member.
S3E01	26 April 2019	Huang Shu-jun, Bibi Zhou, Ye Yiqian, Huang Yali, Ji Dandi	Change or No Change	
S3E02	1 May 2019	Phoenix Legend, Chopstick Brothers	No Birthday Celebration	
S3E03	10 May 2019	William Chan, Janine Chang	Open or Close	
S3E04	17 May 2019	Zhang Jike, Pan Shiyi, Liu Xuan, Wang Tao	The New House is a CBD	
S3E05	24 May 2019	Mao Buyi, Chi Zi, You Zhangjing, Li Zixuan, Tong Zhuo, Huangzi Hongfan, Liu Yase, Lao Lang	Our Youths	
S3E06	31 May 2019	Wang Likun, Victoria Song, Joe Chen, Joey Yung, Kris Wu	The Lost Years	
S3E07	7 June 2019	Wang Likun, Victoria Song, Joe Chen, Joey Yung, Kris Wu	We Love You	
S3E08	14 June 2019	Richie Ren, Cecilia Cheung, Chen Feiyu, He Landou	The Stream of People	
S3E09	21 June 2019	Richie Ren, Cecilia Cheung, Chen Feiyu, He Landou	Serendipity	
S3E10	28 June 2019	Wang Dalu, Wei Daxun, Tan Songyun, Xiong Ziqi, Jiang Xueming	An Actor Prepares	
S3E11	5 July 2019	Wang Dalu, Wei Daxun, Tan Songyun, Xiong Ziqi, Jiang Xueming, Chen He, Lu Han, Hua-Tao Teng	Uncle is Coming	
S3E12	12 July 2019	Chen He, Lu Han, Hua-Tao Teng, Sun Li, Wu Bi, Jiao Yang, Wu Jingyi, Ju Yuan, Jiu Lan, Jiu Xingtong, Chen Minghao, Cai Lu, Xiao Su, Yen Shu, Zhang Lu,	Friends	
S3E13	19 July 2019	Henry Lau		

=== Season 4 ===
The permanent cast of season 4 remains the same as season 3. Filming began on 26 March 2020, in Manyuan Village, Manleine Village Committee, Menghan Town, Jinghong City, Xishuangbanna, Yunnan. The pilot aired on 1 May 2020, and the season premiered on 8 May 2020, and concluded on 24 July 2020.

Episode #	Broadcast Date	Guest
S4E00	1 May 2020	No guests
S4E01	8 May 2020	Zhou Xun, Zhang Ying Yi, Guo Qilin
S4E02	15 May 2020	Sha Yi, Tao Hong
S4E03	22 May 2020	Sha Yi, Tao Hong, Song Wei Long, Silence Wang
S4E04	29 May 2020	Song Wei Long, Silence Wang, Huang Xiao Ming
S4E05	5 June 2020	Seven Tan, Allen Ren, Timmy Xu
S4E06	12 June 2020	Seven Tan, Allen Ren, Timmy Xu, Hai Qing, Ren Zhong
S4E07	19 June 2020	Hai Qing, Ren Zhong, Yue Yunpeng, Mao Bu Yi, Zhou Shen, Zhang Shao Gang
S4E08	26 June 2020	Ren Zhong, Yue Yunpeng, Mao Bu Yi, Zhou Shen, Zhang Shao Gang
S4E09	3 July 2020	Wu Xin, Li Weijia, Du Haitao
S4E10	10 July 2020	Wu Xin, Li Weijia, Du Haitao, Nana Ouyang, Greg Hsu, Lao Lang, Zheng Jun
S4E11	17 July 2020	Nana Ouyang, Greg Hsu, Lao Lang, Zheng Jun
S4E12	24 July 2020	Nana Ouyang, Greg Hsu, Lao Lang, Zheng Jun, Song Dan Dan, Ba Tu, Chen He

=== Season 5 ===
Lay Zhang was added to the permanent cast for season 5. Filming began on 18 March 2021 in Bailinzhou Village, Taohuayuan Town, Taoyuan County, Changde, Hunan. The season premiered on 23 April.

Episode #	Broadcast Date	Guest
S5E00	23 April 2021	No guests
S5E01	30 April 2021	No guests
S5E02	7 May 2021	Qiao Shan, Liu Xiaoyi
S5E03	14 May 2021	Qiao Shan, Liu Xiaoyi, Yang Zi
S5E04	21 May 2021	Yang Zi
S5E05	28 May 2021	Yang Zi, Chen He, Li Dan
S5E06	4 June 2021	Chen He, Li Dan
S5E07	11 June 2021	Chen He, Li Dan, Li Xueqin
S5E08	16 June 2021	No Guests
S5E09	20 June 2021	Na Ying, Liang Jing
S5E10	25 June 2021	Wang Mian, Connor Leong, Su Qing, Qi Si Jun, Shi Kai, Wu Xing, Wu Yi, Huang Yali, Lu Liang (Xiao Fang), Li Wei Jia
S5E11	3 July 2021	Jin Jing, Liu Shen Ying
S5E12	9 July 2021	Liu XiaoYi, Wu Kai, Huang Bo
S5E13	16 July 2021	Huang Bo, Lü Siqing, Chen Sa, Wang Tao
S5E14	23 July 2021	Mao Buyi, Ouyang Nana

=== Season 6 ===
The permanent cast of season 6 remains the same as season 5. Filming began on 7 March 2022 in Shayutang Village, Haiwei Town, Changjiang, Hainan. The season premiered on 29 April 2022.

Episode #	Broadcast Date	Guest
S6E00	29 April 2022	Turbo Liu
S6E01	30 April 2022	No guests
S6E02	14 May 2022	Turbo Liu, Vicky Chen, Zhang Youhao
S6E03	21 May 2022	Turbo Liu, Vicky Chen, Zhang Youhao

== Awards ==
Year	Award	Category	Nominated work	Results	Ref.
2018	24th Shanghai Television Festival	Best Seasonal Variety Show	Back to Field (Season 1)	Nominated	
2020	26th Shanghai Television Festival	Best Variety Show	Back to Field (Season 3)	Nominated	
