= Day of Redemption (film) =

2013 film

- Poster
- Chinese: 消失的凶手
- Directed by: Lawrence Ah Mon
- Written by: Sun Chan
- Produced by: Bai Yu; Sun Chan; Peng Rui Xiang
- Starring: Vic Chou; Bai Yu; Tong Yao; Cao Yunjin
- Cinematography: Du Jie
- Edited by: Eric Kwong Chi-Leung
- Music by: Jane Chan; Tin Ho-Man
- Production companies: Gehua Cultural Development Group; Palette Pictures LLC
- Release dates: July 19, 2013 (Hong Kong); August 25, 2015 (China)
- Running time: 90 minutes
- Country: China
- Language: Mandarin

Day of Redemption (Chinese: 消失的凶手) is a 2013 business-themed romantic drama film directed by Lawrence Ah Mon (the Lee Rock series, starring Andy Lau, and Queen of Temple Street) and starring Vic Chou (a.k.a. Zai Zai, a member of the popular Taiwanese group F4), Bai Yu, Tong Yao and Cao Yunjin. The film was co-financed by Gehua Cultural Development Group, Beijing's cable company, and Palette Pictures LLC. The movie was theatrically released on July 19, 2013, in mainland China.

== Premise ==
Day of Redemption tells the story of Zhou Ting, a young and pretty entrepreneur that fights to protect her lingerie business from a hostile takeover from her former college sweetheart, now an ambitious businessman. But as his rich, jealous girlfriend takes part in the dispute, the two former lovers reignite their old flame.

== Cast ==
- Vic Chou as Gu Bin
- Bai Yu as Alice
- Tong Yao as Zhou Ting
- Cao Yunjin as Zhu Da Fu
- Ye Qianyun

== Release ==
The movie was theatrically released on July 19, 2013, in mainland China, nationwide. YNET.com points that more theaters had to play the film just to accommodate the audience, and considered Day of Redemption the first high concept movie of mainland China, connecting the U.S. education received by the film's producer, writer, and director to its success. Netease Entertainment also deemed the movie "high concept", and Ye Qianyun and Tong Yao's performances were praised. China's CCTV, that broadcasts to about 1 billion people, rated Day of Redemption "intense", and "delighting"

Day of Redemption's online release on Tencent Video, a major Chinese video portal, has received more than 14 million views.
