= One and a Half Summer =

- Promotional poster for One and a Half Summer
- Genre: Romance; Youth
- Written by: Park Min-jung
- Directed by: Zhang Linzi
- Starring: Nichkhun; Xu Lu; Jiang Jinfu; Kelly Yu; Weida Xun; Gao Longke; Meng Jia; Li Chang; He Yanxi
- Opening theme: One and a Half Summer by Xu Lu
- Ending theme: Let It Rain by Nichkhun
- Country of origin: China
- Original language: Chinese
- No. of episodes: 29

Production
- Producer: Xiao Qiukai
- Production location: China
- Production companies: Beijing Shi Ji Lecheng Culture Media Co., Ltd

Original release
- Network: Dragon TV
- Release: 23 June 2014 – July 2014

One and a Half Summer (Chinese: 一又二分之一的夏天; pinyin: Yī yòu èr fēn zhī yī de xiàtiān) is a 2014 Chinese television series produced by Beijing Shiji Lecheng Media. Starring an ensemble cast from South Korea, Taiwan, and China, the series premiered on Dragon TV on 23 June 2014.

== Synopsis ==
"One and a Half Summer" tells the story of a young man named Zhang Hao (Nichkhun) searching for the love of his life that he met in Santorini during a vacation to Greece. Believing that he was destined to be with this mysterious woman, he went all the way to China from New York City just to find this mystery girl named Luo Man. However, when Zhang Hao goes to Nanyang University, he found out that the "Luo Man" (Xu Lu) he was searching for was perhaps another woman whom he never knew before.

At Nanyang University, Zhang Hao meets and befriends Luo Man's band-mate Li Xiuqi (Jiang Jinfu), Ma Juncai, Wen Tingting, and Wang Minqiang. He also finds out that the mystery woman he has searching for is Shu Qing (Yu Wenwen), who was already engaged at the time. Zhang Hao was deeply saddened after being rejected by Shu Qing, but nevertheless learned to move on as time passed by.

Through their encounters, Zhang Hao and Luo Man fell in love. This causes tension between Zhang Hao and Li Xiuqi, Luo Man's childhood friend and secret admirer occurs. Zhang Hao decides to give way for Li Xiuqi, but soon realizes that he could not hide his feelings. Just as Zhang Hao was about to confess his love for Luo Man, his mom called him to go back to New York.

After their final band performance, Zhang Hao revealed that he was leaving. Luo Man, upon hearing this, was especially hurt. One year later, a gathering was held at Santorini where everyone except Luo Man attended. It was told that Luo Man traveled across various countries, leaving her school friends behind. While Zhang Hao was talking to Li Xiuqi, he coincidentally sees Luo Man walking at the beach front.

The final question is: who will Luo Man choose in the end?

== Cast ==
- Nichkhun as Zhang Hao (voiced by MICHAÉL)
  An international college junior who came to China from New York to find Shu Qing, the woman he believed is destined for him at a vacation in Greece. He is very cheerful and friendly, and a food-lover. He became friends with many dormers including Luo Man, who begins to develop unusual feelings towards him.
- Xu Lu as Luo Man
  A philosophy junior. Her father is a professor at her college, and she tries to help him by forming a band to save his flailing teaching career. Along the way, she meets the charming Zhang Hao. Despite their unfortunate band encounter, she starts to fall in love with Zhang Hao.
- Jiang Jinfu as Li Xiuqi
  A junior law student who also serves as the student council president. Seen as the "perfect guy", he is considerate, helpful, principled and gets along with everyone. He is Luo Man's childhood friend who is also in love with her.
- Kelly Yu as Shu Qing
  A junior cello student who trips the heart of Zhang Hao on her trip in Santorini. She is glamorous, aloof, and taciturn. She loves Zhang Hao, but decides to reject him to be with Tang Bowen, whom her parents want. Under the auspices of the seriousness of her father's expectations, she begins playing the cello although she longs to play rock. For this reason, she secretly performs rock music at different bars and gigs.
- Wei Daxun as Ma Juncai
  An economic management junior who repeatedly claim to be a very sensitive Pisces. He is aggressive, loquacious, and romantic. He loves to catch the eyes of the women by using his photoshopped images on social networking pages, but nevertheless gets rejected every time he meets them in real life. A bar incident where Wen Tingting defended him against his date rejecting him led them to become couples.
- Gao Longke as Wen Tingting
  A philosophy junior. She is a good singer who grew up in a wealthy environment. She loves to dress up because she believes that is the best way to capture a man's heart. She initially felt in love with Li Xiuqi and tried to do everything for him, but ended up with Ma Juncai after getting out of her unrequited love towards Xiuqi.
- Meng Jia as Song Qing
  An accounting junior, she is very thrifty and hard working. She easily gets mad when someone destroys the silence of the atmosphere because she cannot focus on her studies.
- Li Chang as Wang Minqiang
  A computer science junior, he is a very silent person who likes playing video games. He does not like to bathe and change clothes, causing people to distance from him. He is the only person from his hometown to enter college.
- He Yanxi as Fan Bingbing
  A junior student who loves to eat. Her goal is to find a man that will accept her for who she is. One year after Zhang Hao left China, she ostensibly ends up with Wang Minqiang.
- Nick Chou as Tang Bowen
  A director and CEO of a company. He is very serious but also romantic. He is the fiancé of Shu Qing and desperately does everything to please her no matter what it takes.
- Zhu Dan as Ding Ling
  An owner of a bar named M Pub Project, who an elegant and meticulous. She remains to be single at age 32 until she meets Luo Haibin whom she crazily fell in love with. Despite their differences, they eventually became a couple.
- Zhou Xiaoou as Luo Haibin
  A music teacher, who is a former singing idol. He is dedicated to giving Luo Man a good life because he failed to give her and her mother an epicurean life when Luo Man's mother was still alive. He accidentally met Ding Ling in an unfortunate situation, which eventually led them to becoming a couple.

== Soundtrack ==
One and a Half Summer - Original Television Soundtrack (一又二分之一的夏天电视剧原声音乐大碟)
No.	Title	Music	Length
1.	"One and a Half Summer (一又二分之一的夏天)"	Xu Lu
2.	"Let it Rain"	Nichkhun
3.	"Parisienne WalkWays"	Yu Wenwen
4.	"I'll Always Be The Same For You"	Yu Wenwen
5.	"Do You Love Me (爱不爱我)"	Zhou Xiao'ou
6.	"Your Smile"	F.I.R.
7.	"The Same Starlight Sky (同一片星空)"	瑞恩·迷嘉尔

== International broadcast ==
It aired in Thailand on True4U from April 20, to August 10, 2015.
