= Shiny Days =

Shiny Days may refer to:

- Shiny Days (game), a 2012 remake of the 2006 erotic visual novel Summer Days
- "Shiny Days" (song), of 2018 by Asaka
- "Shiny Days!", a 2008 song by Stephanie on the album Stephanie

== See also ==
- Shining Days (disambiguation)
