= The Weasel Grave =

- Promotional image
- Also known as: Candle in the Tomb: The Weasel Grave
- Genre: Adventure; Action; Period
- Based on: Ghost Blows Out the Light by Zhang Muye
- Written by: Feng Ji; Xu Su
- Directed by: Guan Hu
- Starring: Ethan Juan; Xu Lu; Hao Hao; Liu Chao
- Country of origin: China
- Original language: Mandarin
- No. of episodes: 20

Production
- Executive producer: Zhu Wenjiu
- Production location: China
- Running time: 35 minutes
- Production companies: Yao Media; Penguin Film Industry; The 7th Impression

Original release
- Network: Tencent Video
- Release: 21 July 2017

The Weasel Grave (Chinese: 鬼吹灯之黄皮子坟) is a 2017 Chinese web series adapted from the second book of the novel series Ghost Blows Out the Light directed by acclaimed director Guan Hu. It stars Ethan Juan, Xu Lu, Hao Hao and Liu Chao. The timeline of story marked it as a prequel to the other adaptations.

The series airs Fridays at 20:00 (CST) on Tencent Video starting 21 July 2017.

== Synopsis ==
In the 1980s, when middle-aged Hu Bayi packs his belongings for one of his adventures, he finds an old photo, which brings his memory back to his college days in the 1960s. He then reminiscences about his first adventure that led him to become a tomb-expert.

== Cast ==
- Ethan Juan as Hu Bayi
- Xu Lu as Hua Mei
- Hao Hao as Ding Sitian
- Ryan Liu Chao as Wang Kaixuan
- Li Yujie as Yan Zi
- Zhang Jinan as White Dog

== Production ==
- The series is Ethan Juan's return to small screen after 8 years.
- Ethan Juan and Xu Lu previously worked together on the variety show Date ! Super Star (約吧！大明星) in the same year.
- Filming began early October and finished in mid December 2016.
- The first trailer and poster were released on July 4, 2017.
- The series has surpassed 1 billion views in just 2 weeks of airing. In 5 weeks, it has surpassed 2 billion views.
