= The Substitute (Chinese TV series) =

Chinese television series

- Original title: 替身
- Genre: Spy, thriller
- Written by: Bai Yu, Chan Sun (Hong Kong)
- Directed by: Bai Yu, Chan Sun (Hong Kong)
- Starring: Feng Jing; He Li; Bai Yu
- Country of origin: China
- No. of episodes: 20

Production
- Running time: 20 minutes
- Production companies: iQIYI; Palette Pictures

Original release
- Network: iQIYI
- Release: 29 November 2015

The Substitute is China's first thriller television series made in co-production with the United States. Presented by iQiyi and Palette Pictures, the show is written and directed by Sun Chan and Bai Yu, with American TV writer Kamran Pasha and director Brenton Spencer as consultants.

The show aired on November 29, 2015, on the Chinese streaming service iQIYI, and received 100 million hits in 10 days after launch. The Substitute is part of IQIYI's strategy to invest in original content.

== Synopsis ==
Before her cosmetic surgery, Zhong Li was a poor waitress in a high-end club, yearning for a fancy life she couldn't afford. But as soon as she removes the medical gauzes, Zhong Li realizes that her face has completely changed—she has just become a doppelganger of Lou Xiaoqian, China's #1 top star. What lies ahead of her is the stardom she had always wanted. But what she did not expect is the horror of discovering that Lou was a spy and she has taken her place. She's now controlled by a secret organization and is forced to execute dangerous missions. How many more times can she escape from death? She has no one to turn to except herself.

== Characters ==
Zhong Li (Feng Jing) is a poor girl from a small town with a dreams of becoming a star one day. After moving to the big city, she becomes a waitress in a high-end club, contented to regularly see her idol Lou Xiaoqian in the venue. Becoming a super star like Lou Xiaoqian has always been her dream, while reality continually fails her. Suddenly, the club's owner, Fang Bing, comes up with a proposal: he offers Zhong Li the chance to become a star by undergoing cosmetic surgery. She takes the opportunity, but after waking up from the surgery, Zhong Li realizes that her face looks identical to Lou Xiaoqian's. Instead of turning from ugly duckling to swan, Zhong Li has turned into Lou Xiaoqian's substitute.

Lou Xiaoqian (Feng Jing) is a super model, an actress and a singer. Her name is the most popular word in China. She is the perfect combination of sexy and elegant. With her stunning appearance and straightforward personality, she earns numerous elite admirers. Unbeknownst to the public, her rise to stardom was engineered by V Group controlled by Fang Bing. Her star identity is just a cover to hide another identity—a spy.

Lou Xiaoqi (Bai Yu) is Lou Xiaoqian's big sister. They have a strong connection, and are each other's cornerstone. An erratic genius, she possesses excellent memory and analytical mind. That is, nothing can hide from her eyes. After being raped by her boss in the bookstore where she worked, Lou Xiaoqi accidentally kills him, and is committed to a mental institution. Upon realizing that her sister has been replaced and goes on a run to find her.

Zhou Yu (Li He) is Zhou Pu's only child. He lost his mother when he was very young, and lived a life arranged by his father, Zhou Pu. The youngest CEO in the tech industry, he's the most eligible bachelor in China and Lou Xiaoqian's avid pursuer.

Fang Bing (Liu Zhuoting) once had a perfect life. After an unexpected betrayal by his most trusted professor, his wife killed herself. He lost everything overnight. For revenge, he joined a secret organization that collects top secret business intelligence. And with their help, he started his media empire, training stars as his spies, including Lou Xiaoqian and Zhong Li.

A Xun (Li Yike) is Zhou Li's boyfriend and works as a paparazzo for a tabloid. Skilled at makeovers and stalking, A Xun is cynical, always telling Zhong Li back alley news and conspiracies. He enjoys detective fiction and wishes he could write a revolutionary novel by himself one day.
