= Fake Fiction =

- Film poster
- Directed by: Shao Xiaoli
- Written by: Wei Gao; Peng Du; Dai Ning; Shao Xiaoli
- Produced by: Lin Hai; Liu May; Lu Xiaoqing; Shao Xiaoli; Grace Zhang
- Starring: Xu Zheng; Zhang Zifeng
- Cinematography: Xiao Weihong
- Edited by: Yong Jiang
- Production companies: Light and Magic of China; Pearl River Film Group; ZhuJiang Film Group
- Distributed by: Dadi Century Film Distribution (Beijing) Co. Ltd.
- Release date: August 23, 2013 (China)
- Running time: 93 minutes
- Country: China
- Language: Mandarin
- Box office: $10,970,000

Fake Fiction (Chinese: 摩登年代) is a 2013 comedy-drama film directed by Shao Xiaoli and starring Xu Zheng and Zhang Zifeng.

== Cast ==
- Xu Zheng
- Zhang Zifeng
- Vanessa Wang
- Zhang Songwen
- Chopstick Brothers (Xiao Yang & Wang Taili)
- Yue Xiaojun
- Du Peng
