= Wei Daxun =

Chinese actor

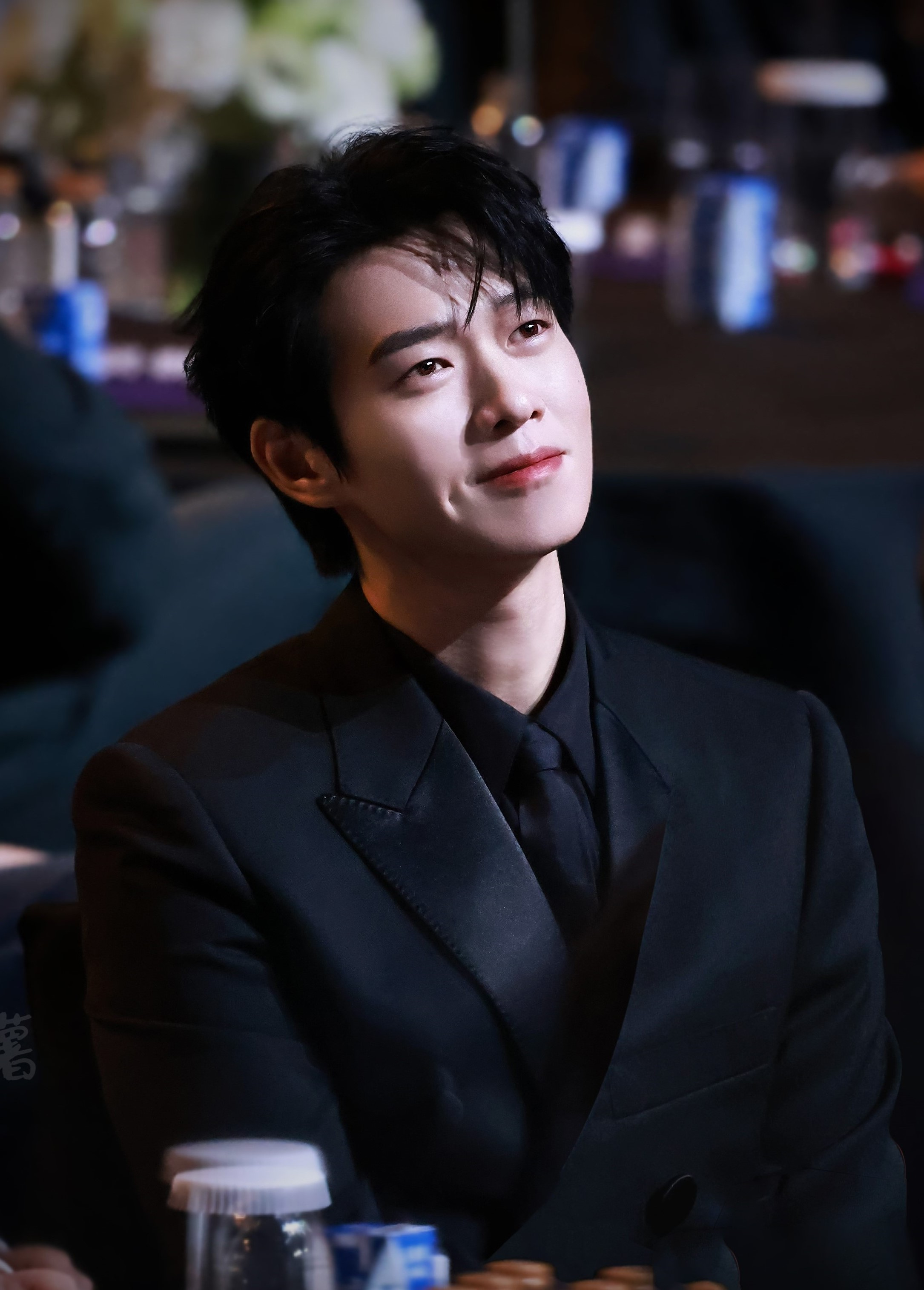
- Wei in 2023
- Born: Wei Xingwen (魏兴文); 12 April 1989 (age 37); Jilin City, Jilin, China
- Education: Central Academy of Drama
- Occupation: Actor
- Years active: 2008–present
- Agent: JYP Entertainment (2014–2017)
- Height: 1.83 m (6 ft 0 in)

Chinese name
- Simplified Chinese: 魏大勋
Transcriptions
Standard Mandarin
- Hanyu Pinyin: Wèi Dàxūn

Wei Daxun (Chinese: 魏大勋 ; born 12 April 1989) is a Chinese actor, singer, and host. Wei ranked 85th on Forbes China Celebrity 100 list in 2019, and 56th in 2020. He graduated from the Central Academy of Drama.

== Career ==
In 2008, he made his acting debut in the youth interactive idol drama "Sophie's Diary" directed by Lin Junchen.

Wei also starred in the 2014 drama, One and a Half Summer, where he played a supporting role. In 2015, he starred in the youth film Forever Young.

In 2014, JYP Entertainment signed Wei, making him the first Chinese actor signed to the Korean company.

On July 10, 2015, his starring youth campus movie Gardenia Blossoms was released, in which he played the actor's promised brother Zhang Zaichang; later, he starred in the spy war drama Grey Goose directed by Wang Lixing. Zhong plays the actor Zhang Zimo.

In January 2016, participated in the Jiangsu Satellite TV star love reality show Let's Fall in Love Season 2.

In January 2017, the Mango TV reasoning variety show The Second Season of Star Detective was broadcast.

In February 2018, as a regular guest, participated in the suspense-style outdoor reality show Twenty-Four Hours Third Season of Zhejiang Satellite TV's original series.

On February 4, 2019, participated in the Spring Festival Gala of China Central Radio and Television and sang the song "Imagination of Youth" with Han Xue, Guan Xiaotong, Wang Jia, and Typhoon Youth Group.

On January 17, 2020, Wei Daxun performed the opening song and dance "My New Year and New Wishes" with Yu Kewei at the China Central Radio Network Spring Festival Gala, and also sang the song "This Age".

== Other activities ==
On May 29, 2014, Wei went to Hong'an County, Hubei Province to participate in the "Dream Enjoying Music Classroom" charity event, which aims to bring dreams to impoverished children through music and at the same time strengthen cultural exchanges between young people in China and South Korea.

On January 7, 2017, he attended the "Green Bicycle China Charity Riding Event" held in Changsha and served as the image ambassador for this event [78]. In April 2019, he participated in the "ME/CFS Urban Slow Life Fan Jingxiang and Good Friends Charity Concert".

== Filmography ==
=== Film ===
Year	English title	Chinese title	Role	Notes/Ref.
2011	1911	辛亥革命	Wu Yuzhang	
2012	Crossing the Border	非常之恋	Wu Yi	
2015	Forever Young	栀子花开	Zhang Zaichang	
2015	Fighting Youth	我是奋青	He Xi	
2015	Honey Enemy	情敌蜜月		Cameo
2015	I Wanna Hold Your Hand	握紧你的手	Li Gang	
2016	The Light	減法人生	Guan Xiaokang	
2017	Fight for Love	因为爱情	Li He	
2017	What a Wonderful Family	麻烦家族	Wen Cong	
2019	The Last Wish	小小的愿望	Zhang Zhengyang	
2019	Somewhere Winter	大约在冬季	Yu Feng	
2019	Begin, Again	亲爱的新年好	Zhong Yao	
2020	Premarital Examination	婚前检查	Chen Wei	
2020	The Rescue	紧急救援	Huo Da	Cameo
2021	1921	1921	Chiang Kai-shek	
2023	The Volunteers: To the War	志愿军：雄兵出击	Mao Anying	
2024	It's All Here	来都来了	Liao Bin	
2025	Always Have Always Will	天堂旅行团	Fang Kuaiqi	

=== Television series ===
Year	English title	Chinese title	Role	Notes/Ref.
2008	Sufei's Diary	苏菲日记	Xiao Nan	
2010	Mao Anying	毛岸英	Mao Anqing	
2011	Police Students	警校生	Duan Li	
2012	Chili and Pickles	辣椒与泡菜	Ji Feng	
2013	Angel is Coming	今夜天使降临	Qi Jinbei	
2014	One and a Half Summer	一又二分之一的夏天	Ma Juncai	
2014	City Hunter	城市猎人	Fan Hongling	
2015		伏弩	Li Nan	
2016	The Love of Happiness	因为爱情有幸福	Ouyang Tianyu	
2016	Shuttle Love Millennium 2	相爱穿梭千年2：月光下的交换	Sun Qilong / Zhang Zhigang	
2017	Fresh Teachers	鲜肉老师	Biao Zi	
2017	Super Medical Resident	高能医少	Hua Yilong	
2018	Caught in the Heartbeat	青春警事	Tang Yixiu	
2018	Women in Beijing	北京女子图鉴	Yang Dahe	
2019	The Brightest Star in the Sky	夜空中最闪亮的星		Cameo
2020	Mr & Ms Trouble	特工别闹	Zhang Zimo	
2020	Ordinary Glory	平凡的荣耀	Hao Shuai	
2020	The Love of Hypnosis	南烟斋笔录	Zhao Xinzhi	
2021	Astringent Girl	涩女郎	Duan Xu	
2022	I am a Super Star	超时空大玩家會	Zhang Ye	
2022	Dr. Tang	关于唐医生的一切	Ye Yiming	
2023	Butterfly Shadow	蝶影	Zhang Zimo	
2023	Fireworks of My Heart	我的人间烟火	Meng Yanchen	
2023	Song Wen Shen	送瘟神	Lai Huaisha	
2023	Spy Game	特工任务	Huang Zicheng	
2023	The Forerunner	问苍茫	Cai Hesen	
2024	Later, I Laughed	不讨好的勇气	Shi Ye	
2025	A Love Never Lost	人生若如初见	Yang Kaizhi	
2026	The Guilty	有罪之身	Lu Ming	
2026	Inside No. 9: Behind the Curtain	九号秘事之黑帷背后	Qin Mian / Jin Sijing / Referee Yang	
2026	Irreplaceable	无可替代	Ye Xinzhi	
TBA	The Infinite 10 Days	十日终焉	Chu Tianqiu	

=== Variety show ===
Year	English title	Chinese title	Role	Notes/Ref.
2015	We Are in Love	我们相爱吧	Cast member	with Li Qin
2016	Number One Surprise	头号惊喜	Cast member	
2017	Twenty Four Hours	二十四小时	Cast member	
2019	Final Expert	终极高手	Cast member	
2019	Great Escape	密室大逃脱	Cast member	
2019	We Are Grown Up	我们长大了	Cast member	
2019	Men That Do Housechores	做家务的男人	Cast member	
2022	First in Last Out	一往无前的蓝		
2023	Camping Life 2	一起露营吧		
2023	Natural High	现在就出发	Guest	

== Discography ==
Year	English title	Chinese title	Album	Notes/Ref.
2015	"Goodbye Goodbye"	再见再见	Forever Young OST	
2016	"A Girl Like You"	像你这样的女孩	The Love of Happiness OST	
2016	"My Everything"		Shuttle Love Millennium 2 OST	
2016	"No Problem"	没关系	The Light OST	
2018	"Regardless"	无论	Caught in the Heartbeat OST	
2018	"Strong Country Generation I Am Here"	强国一代有我在		Promotional song for CCYL
2019	"Unlimited Imagination of Youth"	青春畅想		Performance for CCTV Spring Gala
2019	"We Won't Be Sad in the End"	最后不会有悲伤	The Last Wish OST	with Peng Yuchang & Darren Wang
2019	"My Motherland and I"	我和我的祖国		Project for People's Republic of China's 70th anniversary
2020	"Hand in Hand"	手足		Charity song for Coronavirus

== Accolades ==
Year	Award	Category	Nominated work	Results	Ref.
2015	Asian Influence Awards Oriental Ceremony	Most Promising Newcomer	—N/a	Won	
2017	Netease Crossover Fashion Awards	Most Promising Actor	—N/a	Won	
2017	14th Esquire Man at His Best Awards	New Force Idol Award	—N/a	Won	
2019	6th The Actors of China Awards	Best Actor (Emerald Category)	Caught in the Heartbeat	Nominated	
2019	Cosmo Glam Night	Person of the Year (Love)	—N/a	Won	
