= Our Shining Days =

2017 Chinese-Hong Kong film by Wang Ran

- Theatrical release poster
- Traditional Chinese: 閃光少女
- Simplified Chinese: 闪光少女
- Literal meaning: Shining Girl
- Hanyu Pinyin: Shǎnguāng Shàonǚ
- Directed by: Wang Ran
- Written by: Bao Jingjing
- Produced by: William Kong
- Starring: Xu Lu; Peng Yuchang
- Cinematography: Charles Lee
- Music by: Kubert Leung
- Production companies: Edko Films; DCB Pictures/Tencent Pictures
- Distributed by: Edko Films
- Release date: July 20, 2017
- Running time: 103 minutes
- Countries: China; Hong Kong
- Language: Mandarin
- Box office: US$9.9 million

Our Shining Days (simplified Chinese: 闪光少女; traditional Chinese: 閃光少女; pinyin: Shǎnguāng Shàonǚ; lit. 'Shining Girl') is a 2017 coming-of-age musical film starring Xu Lu and Peng Yuchang. A Chinese-Hong Kong co-production, the film received favorable reviews, particularly for the performance of lead actress Xu Lu and the depiction of minority group's struggles of Chinese orchestra and Otaku.

== Synopsis ==
In a fictitious music school, the students of Chinese orchestra and Classical orchestra don't get along with each other. They call each other "tacky" and "pretentious". Chen Jing, a quirky but talented yangqin student, initially doesn't care about the rivalry, until she falls for the piano prodigy Wang Wen. Annoyed at his ignorance and prejudice toward Chinese instruments, she is determined to prove herself to him by forming her own ensemble, which consists of her best friend who secretly loves her Li You and four Otaku girls whom initially only agreed to join because of Chen Jing's promise to buy them expensive action figures. They named their concert band "2.5 Dimension", meaning a blend between 2D and 3D worlds, as the Otaku people refer to themselves as living in the second dimension. They perform at an Animation, Comics, and Games convention, and after initial rejection the crowd cheers for them.

They perform for Wang Wen but he publicly rejects Chen Jing and traditional Chinese music. Crushed, Chen Jing chooses to disband 2.5 Dimension. The four Otaku students, who have grown to love the band, are angry and refuse Chen Jing's gift of expensive anime figurines. Chen Jing's mother tells her about how the yangqin is a part of her and that she can't give up playing it without its permission. The head of the school announces plans to take in no new students and thus phase out the Chinese Orchestra program. But the original members of 2.5 Dimension are joined by other students to protest. After the head of the school continues to refuse them, they organize a music competition with the Classical Orchestra. An inspector comes to the school and as both orchestras play their music, the Chinese orchestra matches well with the Classical students. The inspector leaves very impressed. Meeting outside, the competition is declared a tie, earning mutual respect. The Chinese orchestra then enlists the help of the Classical orchestra to sneak in and unofficially play after the other performers at a public youth concert, which is being broadcast live. They are met with high praise. The movie ends by showing the arrival of freshmen, including a number keen to learn in the reprieved Chinese orchestra.

== Casting ==
- Xu Lu as Chen Jing, student from the music school's Chinese Music Area who plays the Yangqin
- Peng Yuchang as Li You, percussionist playing Chinese drums
- Liu Yongxi as Xiao Mai, plays the Guzheng
- Li Nuo as Ying Zi, plays the Erhu
- Lu Zhaohua as Beibei, plays the Ruan
- Han Zhongyu as Tata, plays the Pipa
- Luo Mingjie as Wang Wen, plays classical piano
- Chen Yusi as Zheng Youen
- Eason Chan as Ministry of Education's official
- Yan Ni as Mrs. Chen
- Geng Le as Mr. Chen

== Reception ==
Our Shining Days garnered generally-positive response. Edmund Lee of South China Morning Post rated the film 3 out of 5 stars, describing it as "slight but entertaining" while highlighting the film's "youthful spirit".

== Awards and nominations ==
Year	Award	Category	Recipient	Result
2017	20th Shanghai International Film Festival, Asian New Talent Award	Best Actor	Peng Yuchang	Nominated
2017	20th Shanghai International Film Festival, Asian New Talent Award	Best Actress	Xu Lu	Nominated
2017	14th China Movie Channel Media Awards	Best Actress	Xu Lu	Nominated
2017	14th China Movie Channel Media Awards	Best New Actress	Xu Lu	Won
2017	14th China Movie Channel Media Awards	Best Film	Our Shining Days	Won
2017	14th China Movie Channel Media Awards	Best New Director	Wang Ran	Won
2017	14th China Movie Channel Media Awards	Best Screenwriter	Bao Jingjing	Won
2017	14th China Movie Channel Media Awards	Best Supporting Actress	Liu Yongxi	Won
2017	12th Chinese Young Generation Film Forum	Best New Actor	Peng Yuchang	Nominated
2017	12th Chinese Young Generation Film Forum	Best New Actress	Xu Lu	Nominated
2017	Tencent Star Awards	Breakthrough Film Actress	Xu Lu	Won
2017	New Era Film Festival	Best Actress	Xu Lu	Won
2018	9th China Film Director's Guild Awards	Best Actress	Xu Lu	Nominated
2018	9th China Film Director's Guild Awards	Best Film	Our Shining Days	Nominated
2018	9th China Film Director's Guild Awards	Best Director	Wang Ran	Nominated
2018	9th China Film Director's Guild Awards	Best Young Director	Wang Ran	Nominated
2018	9th China Film Director's Guild Awards	Best Screenwriter	Bao Jingjing	Nominated
2018	23rd Huading Awards	Best New Director	Wang Ran	Nominated
2018	23rd Huading Awards	Best Newcomer	Xu Lu	Nominated
2018	25th Beijing College Student Film Festival	Best Screenwriter	Bao Jingjing	Nominated
2018	25th Beijing College Student Film Festival	Best Directorial Debut	Wang Ran	Nominated
2018	25th Beijing College Student Film Festival	Best Newcomer	Peng Yuchang	Nominated
2018	14th Chinese American Film Festival, Golden Angel Award	Best New Actress	Xu Lu	Won
