= Bai Yu (actress) =

Chinese singer

- Occupation(s): Actress, producer, director, writer, singer

Bai Yu (Chinese: 白羽; pinyin: Bái Yǔ) is an actress. She is the president of Palette Pictures LLC, which she founded in 2009. She is a Beijing native.

== Career ==
Prior to studying in America, Bai Yu was an actress and singer in China. She won the "Best New Personality Award" at the Fifth China Central Television (CCTV) Chinese Music Television Competition and subsequently a "Gold Award" at the national Jun Lu Music Video Competition. She went on to become a lead actress in national television, including Absolute Truth and Modern Family, a popular CCTV-produced series.

During her studies in Los Angeles, Bai Yu produced a 14-episode documentary series, Oceans Away, which was commissioned by CCTV and shot in six cities across America.

In 2013, Bai Yu produced and acted in the feature film Day of Redemption (早见晚爱). She also produced several award-winning short film series.

In 2014, Bai Yu directed, produced and wrote the web TV spy thriller series, The Substitute. The show aired on November 29, 2015, on the Chinese streaming service iQIYI, and received 100 million hits in 10 days after launch.

== Filmography ==
Film performances
Year	Title	Role	Notes
2013	Day of Redemption	Alice	

Television performances
Year	Title	Role	Notes
2002	Módēng Jiātíng (The Modern Family)		CCTV series
2008	Zhēnyán		Television series
2015	The Substitute	Lou Xiaoqi	Television drama series

As a producer
Year	Title	Notes
2008	Day of Redemption	Film
2013	Oceans Away	Episodes: "The Undying Patriotism" and "The Glass-Ceiling Breaker"
2015	The Substitute	Television drama series

As a director
Year	Title	Notes
2008	Oceans Away	Television documentary
2008	Rich Kids: Fu Jia Zi Di	Television series
2015	The Substitute	Television drama series
