= Peng Yuchang =

Chinese actor and singer (born 1994)

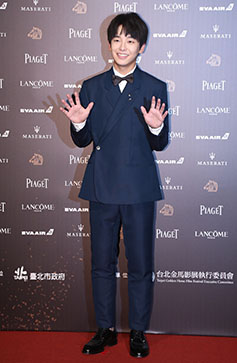
- Peng in 2018
- Born: October 25, 1994 (age 31); Xinyu, Jiangxi, China
- Education: Shanghai Theatre Academy
- Occupations: Actor; singer
- Years active: 2015–present
- Agents: Comic International Productions; Peng Yuchang Studio
- Height: 175 cm (5 ft 9 in)

Chinese name
- Traditional Chinese: 彭昱暢
- Simplified Chinese: 彭昱畅
Transcriptions
Standard Mandarin
- Hanyu Pinyin: Péng Yù Chàng

Peng Yuchang (simplified Chinese: 彭昱畅; traditional Chinese: 彭昱暢; pinyin: Péng Yùchàng, born October 25, 1994) is a Chinese actor and singer. He gained recognition after appearing in Our Shining Days (2017) and Hu Bo's award-winning film An Elephant Sitting Still (2018). He also starred in the films Go Brother! (2018) and Viva La Vida (2024). In television, Peng starred in The Prince of Tennis (2019), a Chinese adaptation of the popular Japanese manga. He later starred in Run For Young (2020) and the fantasy drama I Am Nobody (2023).

He was chosen by CCTV-6's China Movie Report as one of the "New Generation Four Young Actors Skilled in Acting" on 2019, along with Liu Haoran, Leo Wu, and Hu Xianxu. Forbes China listed Peng on their 30 Under 30 Asia 2019 list which consisted of 30 influential people under 30 years old who have had a substantial effect in their fields. Peng ranked 57th on Forbes China Celebrity 100 list in 2019 and 67th in 2020.

== Early life ==
Peng Yuchang was born in Xinyu, Jiangxi, China. In his childhood days, he was always looked after by his grandparents because his parents were busy with work. He was trained to play the saxophone from an early age. He studied at the Shanghai Theatre Academy in 2012, majoring in puppetry. During that time, he performed in Come On, My Life! and other theatrical performances. He graduated from Shanghai Theatre Academy in 2016.

== Career ==
Peng made his acting debut in the romance web drama Go Princess Go (2015) and first gained attention for his performance as Eunuch Jiang. In 2016, he starred in a teen web drama Stardom, acting as an aspiring artist. The same year, Peng took on his first lead role in a fantasy web drama Weapon & Soul. Then he starred in Sohu's self-produced drama Men with Sword.

In 2017, Peng played a swimmer in Chinese sports drama My Mr. Mermaid. Then he starred in musical campus film Our Shining Days and was nominated for Best Actor at Asian New Talent Awards and Best New Actor at China Movie Channel Media Awards during the 20th Shanghai International Film Festival. The same year, Peng reprised his role in the second season of fantasy web drama Weapon & Soul 2.

In 2018, Peng participated in The Birth of Actors, a hit talent show produced by Zhejiang Satellite TV in which actors and actresses compete with guidance from veteran stars to re-enact famous scenes from TV series or movies. Peng was only promoted to the Top 15, but his three performances with completely different acting styles garnered attention from the audience and gained him praises from judges which consist of renowned celebrities such as Zhang Ziyi, Song Dandan, Liu Ye and Director Peter Chan. As a round's winner, Peng also got a chance to perform with Tao Hong, one of the acclaimed judges in the show to re-enact the scenes from The Last Emperor, where he played Emperor Puyi as both a young and middle-aged man. The same year, Peng starred in a comedy family film Go Brother!, adapted from a web manhua series Please Take My Brother Away by Chinese popular cartoonist Soul Sister (幽灵姐妹). The film was commercially successful and received a 9.2 out of 10 score on Maoyan. Peng was also picked by novelist-turned-filmmaker Hu Bo to star in his drama film An Elephant Sitting Still. The casts were offered to play with zero acting fee because of the low-budget production, however Peng still accepted the role as it was the first time for him to be highly valued by a director. For his performance, Peng was nominated for Best Leading Actor at the 55th Golden Horse Awards.

In 2019, Peng starred in Daylight Entertainment's modern family drama All Is Well, adapted from the fiction novel by Ah Nai. The same year, he starred in the youth sports drama The Prince of Tennis based on the hit manga series by Takeshi Konomi, as a talented tennis teenager Lu Xia, where professional tennis players Li Na and Jiang Shan also guest starred in the drama. The drama was aired on Hunan TV and globally released on Netflix. He also starred in fantasy film Over Again and drama film The Last Wish.

In 2020, Peng starred in Zhang Yibai's critically acclaimed coming-of-age web drama Run For Young. The same year, he played the young version of the head coach of the Chinese women's national volleyball team in Peter Chan's biographical sports film Leap. He also played an aspiring entrepreneur in Derek Hui's hit comedy drama film Coffee or Tea? which received positive reviews and hit 300 million RMB at the box office. The movie became the opening film for the 2020 Golden Rooster and Hundred Flowers Film Festival. Later, he was announced as the volunteers ambassador for the 2020 Hainan Island International Film Festival.

In 2021, Peng starred in musical youth film The Day We Lit Up the Sky, which is the sequel of web drama Run For Young. He also starred in the historical movie The Pioneer. The same year, he was appointed as the National Film Promoter for the 11th Beijing International Film Festival.

He is also known for his television work in the program Back to Field which he actively participated in for five consecutive years.

== Filmography ==
=== Film ===
Year	English title	Chinese title	Role	Notes	Ref.
2017	Our Shining Days	闪光少女	Li You		
2018	An Elephant Sitting Still	大象席地而坐	Wei Bu		
2018	Go Brother!	快把我哥带走	Shi Fen		
2018	Spider-Man: Into the Spider Verse!	蜘蛛人：新宇宙	Miles Morales (voice)	Chinese dub	
2019	Over Again	回到过去拥抱你	Zhang Ziyang		
2019	The Last Wish	小小的愿望	Gao Yuan		
2019	My People, My Country	我和我的祖国	Protester	Segment: "Passing By"	
2020	Leap	中国女排	young Chen Zhonghe		
2020	My People, My Homeland	我和我的家乡	young Huang Dabao	Segment: "A Mystery of UFO"	
2020	Coffee Or Tea?	一点就到家	Peng Xiubing		
2020	Bath Buddy	沐浴之王	Xiao Xiang		
2021	The Pioneer	革命者	Zhang Xueliang		
2021	The Day We Lit Up the Sky	燃野少年的天空	Lao Gou		
2021	My Country, My Parents	我和我的父辈	Assistant	Segment: "Poem"	
2024	Viva La Vida	我们一起摇太阳	Lu Tu		
2024	She's Got No Name	酱园弄·悬案	Cai		
2024	Moments We Shared	云边有个小卖部	Liu Shisan		
2024	Welcome to the Game	绑架游戏	Lue Fei		
2025	Always Have Always Will	天堂旅行团	Song Yili		
2025	Gezhi Town	得闲谨制	Xiao Yan		
2025	Enough Is Enough	点到为止	Mr. Mao	Guest	
2025	The Fire Raven	匿杀	Fang Tianyang		
2026	Unexpected Family	过家家	Zhong Bufan		
2026	Game of Identity	天才游戏	Liu Quanlong		

=== Television series ===
Year	English title	Chinese title	Role	Notes	Ref.
2015	Go Princess Go	太子妃升职记	Eunuch Jiang		
2016	Stardom	明星志愿	Lu Feng		
2016	Deep Well Canteen	深井食堂	Xiao Tang		
2016	Men with Sword	刺客列传	Meng Zhang		
2016	Weapon & Soul	器灵	Mo Ming		
2017	Weapon & Soul 2	器灵第二季	Mo Ming		
2017	Men with Sword 2	刺客列传2	Meng Zhang	Guest	
2017	My Mr. Mermaid	浪花一朵朵	Ming Tian		
2019	All Is Well	都挺好	Xiao Meng		
2019	Reset Life	未来的秘密	Zhang Shuo	Cameo	
2019	The Prince of Tennis	奋斗吧，少年！	Lu Xia		
2020	Run for Young	风犬少年的天空	Lao Gou / Tu Jun		
2022	Lady of Law	女士的法则	Song Xiu		
2023	I Am Nobody	一人之下	Zhang Chulan		
2025	I Am Nobody: The Showdown Between Yin & Yang	异人之下之决战! 碧游村	Zhang Chulan		
2026	No Pain No Gain	年少有为	Pei Qian		
2026	The Long Watch	交锋	Chun Xiao		
TBA	Wan Gu Zui Qiang Zong	万古最强宗	Jun Changxiao		

=== Variety shows ===
Year	English title	Chinese title	Role	Notes
2016	Day Day Up	天天向上	Host	
2017	Birth of an Actor	演员的诞生	Contestant	
2018	Wiser VS 3 Adorkable Man	三宝大战诸葛亮	Host	
2018	Back to Field Season 2	向往的生活2	Cast Member	
2019	Back to Field Season 3	向往的生活3	Cast Member	
2020	Back to Field Season 4	向往的生活4	Cast Member	
2021	Back to Field Season 5	向往的生活5	Cast Member	
2021	HaHaHaHaHa Season 2	哈哈哈哈哈 第二季	Cast Member	
2022	Back to Field Season 6	向往的生活6	Cast Member	

== Discography ==
=== Albums ===
Year	English title	Chinese title	Notes
2016	You Must	你一定	

=== Singles ===
Year	English title	Chinese title	Album	Notes
2017	"Seventeen is not a Lie”	十七岁的时光不说谎	—N/a	
2017	"Show me!”		—N/a	
2017	"Hero”	英雄	—N/a	
2018	"The Future Me"	未来已来	—N/a	
2019	"In Youth"	正少年	The Prince of Tennis OST	
2019	"We Won't Be Sad in the End"	最后不会有悲伤	The Last Wish OST	with Darren Wang & Wei Daxun
2019	"Friend Zone"	友情以上	Friend Zone OST	with Zhang Ruonan
2020	"Heart Warms Heart Equals to the World"	心暖心等于世界		

== Awards and nominations ==
Year	Award	Category	Nominated work	Results	Ref.
2017	Asian New Talent Award at the 20th Shanghai International Film Festival	Best Actor	Our Shining Days	Nominated	
2017	China Movie Channel Media Awards at the 20th Shanghai International Film Festival	Best New Actor	Our Shining Days	Nominated	
2017	Weibo Movie Awards	Most Anticipated New Actor	Our Shining Days	Won	
2017	Fresh Asia Chart Festival	Best Film and TV Crossover New Actor	—N/a	Won	
2017	Weibo Awards Ceremony	New Artist of the Year	—N/a	Won	
2018	25th Beijing College Student Film Festival	Best New Actor	Our Shining Days	Nominated	
2018	GQ China Men of the Year	New Actor of the Year	—N/a	Won	
2018	Iqiyi TV and Movie Awards	Breakthrough Movie Actor of the Year	—N/a	Won	
2018	UNO YOUNG Anniversary Party and Celebrity Awards	New Role Model of the Year	—N/a	Won	
2018	55th Golden Horse Film Festival and Awards	Best Leading Actor	An Elephant Sitting Still	Nominated	
2019	Shanghai Film Critics Awards	Best New Actor	An Elephant Sitting Still	Nominated	
2019	CinEuphoria Awards	Best Ensemble Performance	An Elephant Sitting Still	Nominated	
2019	26th Beijing College Student Film Festival	Best New Actor	Go Brother!	Nominated	
2019	25th Huading Awards	Best New Actor	Go Brother!	Nominated	
2019	Weibo Movie Awards	Best Actor	Go Brother!	Nominated	
2020	IFeng Film and TV Award	Best Actor in a Television Series	Run For Young	Nominated	
2020	Sir Movie Cultural And Entertainment Industry Award	Best Leading Actor in a Motion Picture	Coffee or Tea?	Nominated	
2020	Sir Movie Cultural And Entertainment Industry Award	Best Casting	Coffee or Tea?	Nominated	
2020	Sir Movie Cultural And Entertainment Industry Award	Best Casting	Leap	Won	
2020	Iqiyi TV and Movie Awards	Screen Influential Actor of the Year	Leap	Won	
2024	19th Changchun Film Festival	Best Actor	Viva La Vida	Won	
2024	37th Golden Rooster Awards	Best Actor	Viva La Vida	Nominated	
