= Jiang Jinfu =

Chinese actor and model (born 1991)

- Born: September 2, 1991 (age 34); Changsha, Hunan, China
- Education: Shanghai Theatre Academy
- Occupations: Actor, model
- Years active: 2011–2018
- Agents: Tangren Media (2011–2018); Jiang Jinfu Studio (FWS)

Chinese name
- Traditional Chinese: 蔣勁夫
- Simplified Chinese: 蒋劲夫
Transcriptions
Standard Mandarin
- Hanyu Pinyin: Jiǎng Jìnfū

Jiang Jinfu (simplified Chinese: 蒋劲夫; traditional Chinese: 蔣勁夫; pinyin: Jiǎng Jìngfū, born 2 September 1991) is a Chinese actor and model.

== Life and career ==
Jiang was born in Changsha, Hunan. After graduating from Yali High School, he attended Shanghai Theatre Academy in 2009 and graduated in 2013. Initially a model, Jiang became the cover model for the inaugural issue of the youth magazine Firefly and served as a book model for Rao Xueman's novel The Left Ear in 2009. In 2011, Jiang signed a contract with Tangren Media, and gained attention after starring as the leading actor in the 2012 drama Xuan-Yuan Sword: Scar of Sky.

In 2015, Jiang entered into a dispute with his agency, Tangren Media, and established his own studio. On December 29, 2016, the second-instance verdict in Jiang's contract termination case with Tangren was announced. Jiang lost the case for the second time, with the court rejecting his request to terminate the management contract and upholding the original first-instance judgment. His management contract with Tangren remained in effect and was set to expire in March 2018. In April 2018, Jiang announced that he would study abroad in Japan and suspended his acting career.

== Controversy ==
On November 20, 2018, Jiang was revealed to have engaged in domestic abuse toward his ex-girlfriend through a self-admittance post on Weibo. On November 28, police in Japan issued an arrest warrant for Jiang, who was suspected of crime of intentional injury and domestic violence. On November 30, Jiang turned himself in to the police. On January 9, 2019, Jiang was released from police custody in Japan, and the domestic violence charges against him were dropped.

== Filmography ==
=== Film ===
Year	English title	Chinese title	Role	Notes
2012	Xuanyuan Sword 7	轩辕剑7	Chen Jingchou	Short film
2013	A Wedding Invitation	分手合约	Mao Mao	
2013	One Night Surprise	一夜惊喜	Zhi Bo	
2013	Xuanyuan Sword 6	轩辕剑6	Feng Tianling	Short film
2015	Crazy New Year's Eve	一路惊喜	Fu Zai	
2015	Forever Young	栀子花开	An Di	

=== Television series ===
Year	English title	Chinese title	Role	Notes
2012	Xuan-Yuan Sword: Scar of Sky	轩辕剑之天之痕	Chen Jingchou	
2012	Refresh 3+7	刷新3+7	Ye Tianming	
2014	Scarlet Heart 2	步步惊情	Kang Siyu	
2014	One and a Half Summer	一又二分之一的夏天	Li Xiuqi	
2015	The Legend of Qin	秦时明月	Jing Tianming	
2016	The Adventure for Love	寻找爱的冒险	Tang Chao	
2016	Legend of Nine Tails Fox	青丘狐传说	Liu Changyan	
2017	Lightning	进击吧闪电	Ling Zifeng	
2018	The Chronicles of Town Called Jian	茧镇奇缘	Huang Muyun	
2018	Royal Highness	回到明朝当王爷之杨凌传	Yang Ling	
TBA	Love Me & Convince Me	你这么爱我，我可要当真了	Biao Minzhu	
TBA	Pursuit of True Love	米露露求爱记	Chu Jie	
TBA	Leiting Tuji	雷霆突击	Shuai Ke	

=== Variety show ===
Year	English title	Chinese title	Role	Notes
2015	Back to School	我去上学啦	Cast member	
2016	Takes a Real Man	真正男子漢2	Cast member	
