= Forever Young (2015 film) =

- Theatrical poster
- Traditional Chinese: 梔子花開
- Simplified Chinese: 栀子花开
- Literal meaning: Gardenia in blossom
- Hanyu Pinyin: zhī zǐ huā kāi
- Jyutping: zi1 zi2 faa1 hoi1
- Directed by: He Jiong
- Written by: Ao Li
- Produced by: Huang Lei; Shu Yang
- Starring: Li Yifeng; Zhang Huiwen
- Cinematography: Chen Cheng
- Production company: Heyi Pictures
- Release date: July 10, 2015 (China)
- Running time: 107 minutes
- Country: China
- Language: Mandarin
- Box office: US$41.42 million

Forever Young (Chinese: 栀子花开) is a 2015 Chinese coming-of-age film directed by He Jiong and starring Li Yifeng and Zhang Huiwen. The film was released on July 10, 2015.

== Plot ==
Set in an arts performing college, the story revolves around Yan Xi and Xu Nuo, a couple who is envied by many in school. The two work hard to achieve their dreams — Xu Nuo wants to eventually get sign on with a music label with his band and Yan Xi wants to go to Paris for ballet school. However, when Yan Xi finds out that she wasn't accepted into the prestigious program, and that her friends had started making alternate plans, she breaks into a tantrum and starts to distance herself. Before she could make amends, her friends died in a car accident. Full of remorse, Yan Xi has a month to come up with a replacement for the Dance of the Cygnets that the four girls were going to perform at the university's Dream Night Graduation Party. However, before she could think of a solution, Yan Xi falls and injures her leg.

Xu Nuo proposes to his friends that they perform the Dance of the Cygnets themselves. The start training in secret, without Yan Xi's knowledge, intending on giving her a surprise.

== Cast ==
- Li Yifeng as Xu Nuo
- Zhang Huiwen as Yan Xi
- Jiang Jinfu
- Wei Daxun
- Calvin Tu
- Zhang Yuxi
- Li Xin'ai
- Song Yi
- Zhang Yunlong
- Chai Ge as Ji Yan
- Wang Youshuo
- Coco Lee
- Liu Haoran as Host
- Nichkhun

== Reception ==
The film received negative reviews in regard to its plot and acting.

Despite negative reviews, the film made US$38.5 million in its three-day opening weekend in China, debuting at first place at the Chinese box office and third worldwide behind Minions and Terminator Genisys.
