= Sun Chan =

Hong Kong screenwriter

- Occupation: Writer - Director

Sun Chan is an U.S. educated Hong Kong writer/director. Chan graduated with a MA degree in Economics from Yale University.

Sun Chan, who is also the vice president of Palette Pictures holds a MFA in screenwriting from the University of Southern California film school. Before starting his film career, he worked as a brand management specialist at Burson-Marsteller.

== Career ==
Sun is a writer and producer of the feature film, Day of Redemption (Zao Jian Wan Ai), starring Zhou Yumin (aka Zai Zai, a member of the hugely popular Taiwanese group F4). Shortly after its theatrical release, more theaters had to be arranged to play the film in order to accommodate the audience.

Sun Chan also wrote and directed IQIYI's original series The Substitute. The show aired on November 29, 2015, on the Chinese streaming service iQIYI. It received 4,320,000 hits within 4 hours of release, and 200 million hits by the time episode 15 was released.

Prior to his creative ventures, Sun had studied economics at Yale University and worked as a brand management specialist at Burson-Marsteller.

Chan is the Head of Development and Production at Palette Pictures.
