= Last Letter (2018 film) =

2018 Chinese-Hong Kong-Japanese film by Shunji Iwai

- Last Letter poster
- Traditional Chinese: 你好，之華
- Simplified Chinese: 你好，之华
- Hanyu Pinyin: Ni Hao, Zhi Hua
- Jyutping: Nei^{5} Hou^{2} Zi^{1} Waa^{4}
- Directed by: Shunji Iwai
- Written by: Shunji Iwai
- Based on: Last Letter by Shunji Iwai
- Produced by: Peter Chan; Shunji Iwai
- Starring: Zhou Xun; Qin Hao; Zhang Zifeng
- Cinematography: Chigi Kanbe
- Edited by: Shunji Iwai
- Music by: Shunji Iwai ikire
- Distributed by: China Lion Film Distribution
- Release date: November 9, 2018
- Running time: 115 minutes
- Countries: China; Hong Kong; Japan
- Language: Mandarin
- Box office: $11.8 million

Last Letter (Chinese: 你好，之华) is a 2018 romance film written, directed, edited, co-produced and co-scored by Japanese filmmaker Shunji Iwai, based on his own novel, and starring Zhou Xun, Qin Hao and Zhang Zifeng. A Chinese-Hong Kong-Japanese co-production, it was released on November 9, 2018. Iwai adapted the same novel into a Japanese film, also known as Last Letter, released in 2020.

== Synopsis ==
The film tells the story of a Chinese woman named Yuan Zhihua (Zhou Xun), a key figure to resolving a conflict that has lasted three generations.

Yuan Zhihua represents her deceased older sister at a middle school reunion and meets her previous lover, Yi Chuan. This sparks a series of letters involving Zhihua, Yi Chuan, her older sister, and her daughter.

== Cast ==
- Zhou Xun as Yuan Zhihua
  - Zhang Zifeng as young Yuan Zhihua
- Qin Hao as Yin Chuan
  - Bian Tianyang as young Yin Chuan
- Du Jiang as Zhou Wentao
- Zhang Zifeng as Zhou Saran
- Deng Enxi as young Yuan Zhinan / Yuan Mumu
- Hu Changlin as Yuan Chenchen
- Wu Yanshu as Chen Guizhi
- Tan Zhuo as Ji Hong
- Hu Ge as Zhang Chao

== Awards and nominations ==
Award	Category	Recipients	Result
55th Golden Horse Awards	Best Leading Actress	Zhou Xun	Nominated
55th Golden Horse Awards	Best Supporting Actress	Zhang Zifeng	Nominated
55th Golden Horse Awards	Best Original Screenplay	Shunji Iwai	Nominated
38th Hong Kong Film Awards	Best Film from Mainland and Taiwan	Last Letter	Nominated
