= Go Brother! =

2018 film directed by Cheng Fen-fen

- Theatrical release poster
- Simplified Chinese: 快把我哥带走
- Literal meaning: Please Take My Brother Away!
- Hanyu Pinyin: Kuài bǎ wǒ gē dài zǒu
- Directed by: Cheng Fen-fen
- Screenplay by: Cheng Fen-fen; Lü Xu; Zhao Yue
- Based on: Please Take My Brother Away! by You Ling
- Produced by: Chen Hsi-sheng
- Starring: Zhang Zifeng; Peng Yuchang; Zhao Jinmai
- Cinematography: Zhang Ying
- Edited by: Gu Xiaoyun
- Music by: Owen Wang
- Production company: Wanda Media
- Distributed by: Wuzhou Film Distribution
- Release date: August 17, 2018
- Running time: 115 minutes
- Country: China
- Language: Mandarin
- Box office: US$54.7 million

Go Brother! (Chinese: 快把我哥带走) is a 2018 Chinese comedy film co-written and directed by Cheng Fen-fen, based on the manhua series Please Take My Brother Away! by You Ling. It stars Zhang Zifeng and Peng Yuchang as a bickering sibling duo, with the fed-up younger sister, Shi Miao, wishing her mischievous brother away, only to wake up and discover he is now her best friend's brother, leading her to uncover his hidden secrets. The film was theatrically released on August 17, 2018.

== Plot ==
Middle school girl Shi Miao is often teased by her mischievous older brother, Shi Fen, and as a result, she doesn’t like him very much. Meanwhile, their parents' relationship is on the verge of collapse, but Shi Fen seems indifferent, which only makes Shi Miao even more frustrated with him. She frequently discusses strategies with her best friend, Miao Miao, hoping to mend her parents' relationship, but all their attempts end in failure.

One day, overwhelmed with frustration, Shi Miao makes a birthday wish for someone to take her brother away. To her surprise, her wish comes true. When she wakes up the next morning, Shi Fen has become Miao Miao's brother. It is only then that Shi Miao begins to understand the true intentions behind her brother's past actions.

== Cast ==
- Zhang Zifeng as Shi Miao
- Peng Yuchang as Shi Fen
- Zhao Jinmai as Miao Miao
- Sun Zeyuan as Zhen Kaixin
- Zhou Yiran as Wan Sui
- Liu Guanyi as Wan Xing
- Jiang Hongbo as Shi Miao's mother
- Xu Guangyu as Shi Miao's father
- Chen Xisheng as Policeman

== Production ==
=== Development ===
Go Brother! is adapted from the popular manhua by You Ling. Screenwriter Zhao Yue was captivated by the comic upon first reading it in 2016 and eagerly joined the film project when producer Lü Xu approached her. Given the film industry's typically cautious approach to family-themed films, Zhao aimed to create a story that balanced both familial bonds and youthful energy. Lü, with a deep passion for youth films, saw the story's themes as a perfect fit for his vision.

Director Cheng Fen-fen, known for her strong grasp of emotional storytelling, joined the project during the script development phase. Coming from a family with four siblings, she felt a personal connection to the sibling dynamic and hoped to use the film to convey warmth and encourage audiences to cherish family bonds.

=== Filming ===
Filming took place primarily in Xiamen, showcasing locations like Shapowei, Hongshan Tunnel, and Xiamen No.1 High School for school scenes. The production underwent extensive refinement, with the script revised ten times before filming began. Lü even consulted 70 professionals from various fields for feedback.
