= Zhang Zifeng =

Chinese actress (born 2001)

- 张子枫
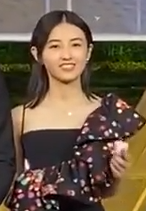
- Zhang in 2019
- Born: 27 August 2001 (age 25); Sanmenxia, Henan, China
- Other name: Wendy Zhang
- Education: Beijing Film Academy
- Occupation: Actress
- Years active: 2008–present
- Agents: Huayi Brothers (2010–2015); Zhang Zifeng Studio (2015–present)

Zhang Zifeng
- Simplified Chinese: 张子枫
- Traditional Chinese: 張子楓
Transcriptions
Standard Mandarin
- Hanyu Pinyin: Zhāng Zǐfēng
Yue: Cantonese
- Jyutping: Zoeng1 Zi2 Fung1

Zhang Zifeng (born 27 August 2001), also known as Wendy Zhang, is a Chinese actress. Regarded as one of the New Four Dan actresses of the post-95s Generation, she is widely considered one of the best young actors in China today.

Zhang first gained recognition for her role in Aftershock (2010), where her performance as a young girl surviving the 1976 Tangshan earthquake won her Best Newcomer at the 31st Hundred Flowers Awards, making her the youngest ever Hundred Flowers Award winner. She later starred in films such as Go Brother! (2018), Last Letter (2018), and Upcoming Summer (2021). For her performance in Sister (2021), she won the Best Actress awards at the 16th Changchun Film Festival and 19th Huabiao Awards. Zhang ranked 98th on Forbes China Celebrity 100 list in 2019, and 81st in 2020.

== Early life and education ==
Zhang Zifeng was born on 27 August 2001 in Sanmenxia, Henan. At about the age of five, she moved to Beijing with her mother to make commercials, and at seven, she was cast in her first television role, as Xiao Niuzi in an adaptation of Lao She's Dragon Beard Ditch. In 2020, she placed third in the acting admissions of the Beijing Film Academy.

== Career ==
=== 2010–2016: Child actress ===
Zhang came to prominence as the young Fang Deng in Feng Xiaogang's 2010 film Aftershock, after which she signed with Huayi Brothers as its 100th contracted artist. The role won her the Best Newcomer award at the 31st Hundred Flowers Awards in 2012, making her, at 11, the youngest winner in the awards' history. She worked with Feng again in Back to 1942 (2012), and as a child, she appeared in television dramas such as My Father's Name Is Bench and Healing Hands and in films including Fake Fiction, opposite Xu Zheng, and My Old Classmate.

In 2015, she played Sinuo, a mysterious teenager, in Detective Chinatown, a role she reprised in Detective Chinatown 3. In 2016, she played Fang Duoduo in the family drama A Love for Separation, for which she won the Huading Award for Best Supporting Actress. In 2017, the Communist Youth League named her one of ten "outstanding youths" from the entertainment industry.

=== 2017–2021: Teenage roles and Sister ===
Zhang starred in the campus film How Are You in 2017. In 2018, she played the young Zhihua opposite Zhou Xun in Shunji Iwai's Last Letter, which earned her a nomination for Best Supporting Actress at the 55th Golden Horse Awards, and she played the lead, Shi Miao, in the fantasy comedy Go Brother!. From 2019, she was a regular on the Hunan Television variety show Back to Field, and she played the young Lü Xiaoran in a segment of My People, My Country. She was named on Forbes China's Celebrity 100 list in 2019 and 2020.

In 2021, Zhang starred as An Ran, an older sister left to decide her young brother's future after their parents die, in Sister. For the role, she was nominated for Best Actress at the 34th Golden Rooster Awards, won Best Actress at the 16th China Changchun Film Festival and received the Outstanding Actress award at the 19th Huabiao Awards in 2023. Her other films that year included the youth films Upcoming Summer, with Wu Lei, and Goodbye My Lad.

=== 2022–present ===
In 2022, Zhang starred in the television dramas The Heart of Genius and Homesick. She appeared in Chen Kaige's war films The Volunteers: To the War (2023) and The Volunteers: The Battle of Life and Death (2024), starred in the romance I Love You, to the Moon and Back in 2024, and played Andy Lau's daughter in the action film High Forces. In 2025, she appeared in Peter Chan's She's Got No Name and with Jackie Chan in the crime film The Shadow's Edge, and she performed at the CCTV Spring Festival Gala.

In January 2026, she starred opposite Mark Chao in Loving Strangers, a remake of the South Korean drama My Mister. In July 2026, she was nominated for Best Actress at the 38th Hundred Flowers Awards for The Volunteers: The Battle of Life and Death and The Shadow's Edge, and in October 2026, she was nominated for Best Actress at the 39th Golden Rooster Awards for The Shadow's Edge.

== Filmography ==
=== Film ===
Year	English title	Chinese title	Role	Notes/Ref.
2009	Wushu	武术之少年行	Xiaofang	
2010	Aftershock	唐山大地震	Fang Deng (child)	
2012	Back to 1942	一九四二	Girl killed by bombs	
2012	Baby Don't Cry	宝贝别哭	Orphan	
2013	Better and Better	越来越好之村晚	Village girl	
2013	The Palace	宫锁沉香	Chenxiang (young)	
2013	Fake Fiction	摩登年代	Diudiu	
2014	My Old Classmate	同桌的你	Zhou Xiaozhi (young)	
2014	Mr. Peabody & Sherman	天才眼镜狗	Pei Ni	Voice-dubbed
2015	Detective Chinatown	唐人街·探案	Snow	
2016	Phantom of the Theatre	魔宫魅影	Kong Lan (young)	
2017	How Are You	李雷和韩梅梅	Han Meimei	
2017	Invisible TA	看不见的TA	Xiao Feng	Oppo short film
2018	Go Brother!	快把我哥带走	Shi Miao	
2018	Last Letter	你好，之华	Zhihua (young)	
2019	Desire Game	欲念游戏	Mengmeng	
2019	Abominable	雪人奇缘	Xiao Yi	Voice-dubbed
2019	My People, My Country	我和我的祖国	Lü Xiaoran	
2019	Adoring	宠爱	Jiang Nan	
2019	Begin, Again	亲爱的新年好		
2021	Detective Chinatown 3	唐人街探案3	Snow	
2021	Passage of My Youth	岁月忽已暮	Jiang He	
2021	Home Sweet Home	秘密访客	Wang Chutong	
2021	Goodbye My Lad	再见，少年	Li Fei	
2021	Sister	我的姐姐	An Ran	
2021	Upcoming Summer	盛夏未来	Chen Chen	
2023	The Volunteers: To the War	志愿军：雄兵出击	Li Xiao	
2024	I Love You, to the Moon and Back	穿过月亮的旅行	Lin Xiushan	
2024	The Volunteers: The Battle of Life and Death	志愿军：存亡之战	Li Xiao	
2024	High Forces	危机航线	Gao Xiaojun	
2024	She's Got No Name	酱园弄	Ye Nianzhi	
2025	The Shadow's Edge	捕风追影	He Qiuguo	

=== Television series ===
Year	English title	Chinese title	Role	Notes/Ref.
2008	Peace Is Blessing	平安是福	Hulu	Sitcom
2008	Computer Kids	电脑娃娃	Wang Shasha	Sitcom
2008	The Judge Who Resolves Family Disputes	清官难断家务事	Fangfang	Sitcom
2008	Rather Be a Woman	宁为女人	Xu Xuefang (child)	
2009	Local Wives, Migrant Husbands	本地媳妇外来郎	Wanzi	Sitcom
2009	Invincible Love	大爱无敌	Xu Jiajia	
2009	Dragon Beard Ditch	龙须沟	Niuzi (child)	
2009	Secret Train	秘密列车	Xie Tiantian	
2010	I Want a Home	我要一个家	Meng Xiaolu (child)	
2010	You Are My Life	你是我的生命	Nan Bingjie (child)	
2010	Mom, I Love You	妈妈我爱你	Zhang Yao (child)	
2011	My Father's Name Is Bench	我的父亲是板凳	Hong'er	
2011	Emotions War	情感战争	Gu Le	
2012	Dad Come Home	老爸回家	Huo Cong	
2012	Healing Hands	心术	Nannan	
2012	Happiness Blossom	幸福绽放	Xia Fei (young)	
2013	Longmen Express	龙门镖局	Xiaoxuerong	
2013	Shining Days	璀璨人生	Yu Fei (young)	
2014	Hero in a Mask	面具俠	Walnut	
2016	A Love for Separation	小别离	Fang Duoduo	
2017	Boyhood	我们的少年时代	Li Zi	
2017	Inference Notes	推理笔记	Xia Zao'an	
2018	One and Another Him	我和两个Ta	Lin Yuan	
2022	The Heart of Genius	天才基本法	Lin Zhao xi	
2022	Homesick	回来的女儿	Chen You xi	
2026	Loving Strangers	秋雪漫过的冬天	Zhou Yu'an	

=== Television show ===
Year	English title	Chinese title	Role	Notes/Ref.
2019–present	Back to Field	向往的生活	Cast member	Being guest in season 2 and became a cast member since season 3

== Discography ==
=== Soundtrack appearances ===
Year	English title	Chinese title	Album	Notes/Ref.
2018	"Pink Memories"	粉紅色的回憶	Detective Chinatown 2 OST	with Wang Baoqiang, Liu Haoran, Xiaoshenyang & Xiao Yang
2019	"Adoring"	宠爱	Adoring OST	

== Accolades ==
=== Awards and nominations ===
Year	Award	Category	Nominated work	Result	Ref.
2012	31st Hundred Flowers Awards	Best Newcomer	Aftershock	Won	
2017	5th China Britain Film Festival	Best Newcomer	How Are You	Won	
2017	22nd Huading Awards (TV series)	Best Supporting Actress	A Love for Separation	Won	
2017	Chinese Communist Youth League (CCYL)	"May 4th Medal"	—N/a	Won	
2018	55th Golden Horse Awards	Best Supporting Actress	Last Letter	Nominated	
2019	26th Beijing College Student Film Festival	Best Newcomer	Go Brother!	Nominated	
2019	Forbes China 30 Under 30 Asia	—N/a	—N/a	listed	
2021	30th Huading Awards	Best Actress	Sister	Nominated	
2021	15th Asian Film Awards	Best Actress	Sister	Nominated	
2021	34th Golden Rooster Awards	Best Actress	Sister	Nominated	
2021	16th Changchun Film Festival	Best Actress	Sister	Won	
2022	36th Hundred Flowers Awards	Best Actress	Sister	Nominated	
2023	19th Huabiao Awards	Outstanding Actress	Sister	Won	

=== Listicles ===
Year	Publisher	Listicle	Placement	Ref.
2025	Asia-Pacific Entrepreneurs Association (APEA)	Asia-Pacific U30 Outstanding Young Leaders	Included	
